= List of Kanon episodes =

Left: Kanon anime Region 2 DVD box set containing all thirteen episodes released by Frontier Works.
Right: Kanon anime Region 1 box set containing all twenty-four episodes released by Funimation Entertainment.

The Kanon anime, which encompasses two television series produced by different studios and an original video animation (OVA), is based on the visual novel Kanon by the Japanese visual novel brand Key. The story follows the main character Yuichi Aizawa, who has returned to the town where seven years ago he would spend his school vacations. As he used to do back then, he is living with his aunt Akiko Minase and his cousin Nayuki, but has forgotten many of the details regarding his previous visits. Over the course of the series Yuichi slowly regains these memories as he meets new friends and is reacquainted with others from his past.

Thirteen episodes were produced for the first Kanon anime series by Toei Animation and directed by Takamichi Itō. The episodes were broadcast between January and March 2002, and were later released to Region 2 DVD between April and October 2002 by Frontier Works. Spanning seven volumes, each volume contained two episodes except the first which had one. The series was re-released as a seven-disc DVD box set in December 2004 by Frontier Works in limited and regular editions in Japan. In March 2003, an OVA episode, Kanon Kazahana, was released on DVD. It was also produced by Toei Animation and directed by Takamichi Itō.

Twenty-four episodes were produced for the second Kanon anime series by Kyoto Animation and directed by Tatsuya Ishihara. The episodes were broadcast between October 2006 and March 2007, and were later released to Region 2 DVD between January and August 2007 by Pony Canyon in limited and regular editions containing three episodes per volume. While the plot does not differ from the first anime, the greater number of episodes allows the inclusion of more detail from the visual novel on which the series is based. The second anime series was licensed for North American distribution by Funimation Entertainment. The episodes were released on Region 1 DVDs in six volumes between January and October 2008, and a box set containing the entire series was released in April 2009.

== Kanon (2002) ==
The first anime adaptation under the title Kanon is produced by the Japanese animation studio Toei Animation, directed by Takamichi Itō, written by Ryota Yamaguchi, Makoto Nakamura, and Michiko Yokote, and features character design by Yōichi Ōnishi who based the designs on Itaru Hinoue's original concept. Thirteen episodes were produced which aired after midnight between January 31 and March 28, 2002, on the Fuji TV Japanese television network. Except for episodes three, four, and seven, the titles from the episodes are named for tracks on the visual novel's original soundtrack. The episodes were released to Region 2 DVD between April 1 and October 2, 2002, by Frontier Works. Spanning seven volumes, each volume contained two episodes except the first which had one. The series was re-released as a seven-disc DVD box set on December 22, 2004, by Frontier Works in limited and regular editions in Japan. In March 2003, an original video animation episode was released on DVD containing the single episode "Kanon Kazahana" also produced by Toei Animation and directed by Takamichi Ito. The episode is set at the same time as the last episode of the anime series. The DVD was released via a promotional campaign and was given to anyone who bought all seven DVDs for the first anime series. Two pieces of theme music are used for the episodes; one opening theme and one ending theme. The opening theme is "Florescence", and the ending theme is "Flower"; both songs are sung by Miho Fujiwara.

No.	Title	Directed by	Written by	Original release date
1	"The Girl of Snow"; Transliteration: "Yuki no Shōjo" (Japanese: 雪の少女)	Takamichi Itō	Ryōta Yamaguchi; Hiroaki Toyama; Staff Why	January 31, 2002
Yuichi Aizawa comes to stay at his cousin's home in northern Japan after seven years. He meets Ayu Tsukimiya in the shopping district, who pulls him into running away from a taiyaki vendor with her.
2	"A Sunny Town"; Transliteration: "Hidamari no Machi" (Japanese: 日溜まりの街)	Junichi Fujise	Ryōta Yamaguchi; Hiroaki Toyama; Staff Why	February 7, 2002
Yuichi attends his first day at his new school, and later meets Shiori Misaka after another run-in with Ayu. The next day he finds Shiori visiting the schoolyard.
3	"Just This One Little Memory"; Transliteration: "Tatta Hitotsu no Chiisana Kioku" (Japanese: たった一つの小さな記憶)	Shigeyasu Yamauchi	Ryōta Yamaguchi; Hiroaki Toyama; Staff Why	February 14, 2002
After his second day of classes, Makoto Sawatari tracks Yuichi down in the shopping district, trying to pick a fight. She collapses from hunger, however, and Akiko takes her in. The next day, after discovering some of her pranks, Yuichi suspects her of stealing his wallet.
4	"To the Night"; Transliteration: "Yoru e" (Japanese: 夜へ)	Hiroyuki Kakudō	Ryōta Yamaguchi; Hiroaki Toyama; Staff Why	February 14, 2002
Yuichi finds Mai Kawasumi in battle at night in the school building. Following an incident at lunch with a stray dog the next day, he joins her for lunch. After school, he joins Ayu in her search for a precious object, with no results. That night, he brings Mai some dinner.
5	"The Fox and the Grapes"	Hidehiko Kadota	Ryōta Yamaguchi	February 21, 2002
Mai is implicated by the student council for some broken windows. Yuichi visits Mai again at night, but Makoto attracts the attention of the night watch. Makoto runs away from Akiko's house after a heated quarrel with Yuichi.
6	"Those Girls' Opinions"; Transliteration: "Kanojotachi no Kenkai" (Japanese: 彼女たちの見解)	Takamichi Itō	Ryōta Yamaguchi; Hiroaki Toyama; Staff Why	February 21, 2002
Yuichi searches for Makoto at night, and finds her in the shopping district. Shadowing her, he follows her to the hill overlooking the city and discovers that she found a stray cat. He takes both of them home, and the cat is named Piroshiki. Yuichi and Sayuri convince Mai to take part in the upcoming ball. Piro and Akiko fall ill, and Makoto and Ayu take care of them.
7	"The Ball"; Transliteration: "Butōkai" (Japanese: 舞踏会)	Takamichi Itō; Kiyokazu Sekimizu	Makoto Nakamura; Shino Hiramatsu	February 28, 2002
At first, Mai makes a good impression at the ball, but the lights are destroyed and Mai is again implicated. When Mai faces expulsion, Sayuri convinces the student council to reverse the punishment by agreeing to join the council. On Mai's birthday, Sayuri is injured by the monsters Mai hunts.
8	"Girl's Prison"; Transliteration: "Shōjo no Ori" (Japanese: 少女の檻)	Shigeyasu Yamauchi	Makoto Nakamura; Shino Hiramatsu	March 14, 2002
Mai resolves to end the fighting once and for all. As Mai and Yuichi fight the monsters together, Yuichi traces another fragment of his lost memory.
9	"Beyond that Smile"; Transliteration: "Egao no Mukōgawa ni" (Japanese: 笑顔の向こう側に)	Harume Kosaka	Michiko Yokote	March 21, 2002
Yuichi learns about Shiori's condition and Kaori's silence. Prompted by Nayuki, Yuichi spends an entire day with Shiori, forging happy memories.
10	"The Winter Fireworks"; Transliteration: "Fuyu no Hanabi" (Japanese: 冬の花火)	Hideki Hiroshima	Ryōta Yamaguchi	March 21, 2002
Makoto falls ill, and Yuichi discovers her true identity.
11	"Promise"; Transliteration: "Yakusoku" (Japanese: 約束)	Hiroyuki Kakudō	Makoto Nakamura; Shino Hiramatsu	March 28, 2002
Yuichi and Ayu watch a movie together, and as they become closer, Nayuki is heartbroken. Ayu takes Yuichi to her school, but they make a startling discovery.
12	"A Mark of a Dream"; Transliteration: "Yume no Ato" (Japanese: 夢の跡)	Hidehiko Kadota	Ryōta Yamaguchi	March 28, 2002
Yuichi remembers what happened to Ayu, seven years ago, as well as the thing she was searching for—a little angel doll. Nayuki, Kaori, and Jun help him unearth the doll. Akiko is hit by a car in a blizzard. Ayu, in order to let Yuichi use the doll, asks him to let her go as a final wish.
13	"Where the Wind Leads"; Transliteration: "Kaze no Tadoritsuku Basho" (Japanese: 風の辿り着く場所)	Takamichi Itō	Ryōta Yamaguchi	March 28, 2002
It is now spring, and Mai and Sayuri have graduated. Although Akiko is on the road to recovery, a rift still remains between Nayuki and Yuichi. On the day Yuichi is scheduled to leave and transfer to another school, Nayuki sees a familiar name tag at the hospital.
OVA	"Kanon Kazahana"; Transliteration: "Kanon Kazahana" (Japanese: カノン 風花)	Takamichi Itō	Ryōta Yamaguchi; Makoto Nakamura	March 2003
The spring has come since Yuichi reunited with Ayu, and everyone else's lives are back on track. However, when Mishio visits Makoto's birthplace, a miracle happens before her eyes.

== Kanon (2006–07) ==
The second anime adaptation also under the title Kanon is produced by the Japanese animation studio Kyoto Animation, directed by Tatsuya Ishihara, written by Fumihiko Shimo, and features character design by Kazumi Ikeda who based the designs on Itaru Hinoue's original concept. On August 25, 2006, a teaser DVD named "Kanon Prelude" was produced as a limited edition containing interviews with the cast, clean opening and ending sequences, and promotional footage of the anime itself. Twenty-four episodes were produced which aired between October 5, 2006, and March 15, 2007, on the Japanese television broadcasting station BS-i. While the plot does not differ from the first anime, the greater number of episodes allows the inclusion of more detail from the visual novel on which the series is based. The episodes were released to Region 2 DVD between January 1 and August 1, 2007, by Pony Canyon in limited and regular editions containing three episodes per volume. Pony Canyon released a Blu-ray Disc box set on December 16, 2009, in Japan.

The episodes were originally licensed for North America by ADV Films. The episodes were released on Region 1 DVD in six volumes between January 1 and October 14, 2008. However, between volumes 5 and 6, the rights for the series were transferred to Funimation, who did a limited release of volume 6. ADV supplied and completed the dub for the series. The second DVD volume was sold in two editions, with the difference between the two being a series box all the DVDs could fit inside. A box set containing the entire series was released by Funimation on April 28, 2009.

The non-Japanese words included in the original titles of the episodes are names or subgenres of classical music composition. Continuing with this theme, Pachelbel's Canon often plays in the background of some scenes. It was first heard in episode one, while Ayu and Yuichi hide in a café, then again during episode eleven in the ice-cream parlor Nayuki and Yuichi were visiting. It plays during the fourteenth episode, in a scene between Sayuri and Yuichi. The last time it is heard is during the final episode where Akiko speaks with Yuichi in the same café as before. Another reference hidden in the anime is a homage to One: Kagayaku Kisetsu e a title that the Key team had worked on while they were still working for Tactics—Rumi Nanase, one of the heroines in One, has cameo appearances in several points in the anime.

Two pieces of theme music are used for the episodes; one opening theme and one ending theme. The opening theme for the second anime adaptation is "Last regrets", and the ending theme used for the same production "Kaze no Tadoritsuku Basho" (風の辿り着く場所, Where the Wind Reaches); both songs are sung by Ayana and were the original opening and ending themes from the visual novel. The rest of the soundtrack for the second anime series is sampled from several albums released for the Kanon visual novel including the Kanon Original Soundtrack, Anemoscope, Recollections, and Re-feel. This does not include an insert song used in episode sixteen titled "Last regrets (X'mas floor style)" by Eiko Shimamiya from I've Sound's first album Regret.

No.	Title	Directed by	Written by	Original release date
1	"Silver Overture"; Transliteration: "Hakugin no Jokyoku ~overture~" (Japanese: 白銀の序曲 〜overture〜)	Kazuya Sakamoto	Fumihiko Shimo	October 5, 2006
Yuichi Aizawa returns to the snowy town he used to stay as a child seven years ago, under the roof of his cousin, Nayuki Minase, and her mother, Akiko Minase. Nayuki reintroduces Yuichi to his surroundings, during which, other characters are introduced to most of the main cast, if only in passing.
2	"Introit in the Snow"; Transliteration: "Yuki no Naka no Nyūsaishō ~introit~" (Japanese: 雪の中の入祭唱 〜introit〜)	Taichi Ishidate	Fumihiko Shimo	October 12, 2006
Today is Yuichi's first day at the local high school, and is admitted into Nayuki's class. As Yuichi is walking home to buy food for dinner, he runs into Ayu Tsukimiya, the girl from the day before, in the exact same situation. As they are walking home, they run into a quiet first-year student. When he goes to shop for groceries, a mysterious girl attacks him, but is exhausted from hunger.
3	"A Forgotten Partita"; Transliteration: "Kioku no nai Kumikyoku ~partita~" (Japanese: 記憶のない組曲 〜partita〜)	Noriyuki Kitanohara	Fumihiko Shimo	October 19, 2006
Bringing the girl that attacked him home, Yuichi finds out she has amnesia and it quickly becomes apparent that the only thing she is able to remember is that she has a grudge against him. Despite Yuichi wanting to hand her over to the police, Akiko lets the girl stay, and as she begins to stay longer, she recalls her name being Makoto Sawatari. At school, Yuichi sees the same first-year student from the day before standing in the courtyard; she introduces herself as Shiori.
4	"Holiday Caprice"; Transliteration: "Kyūjitsu no Kisōkyoku ~caprice~" (Japanese: 休日の奇想曲 〜caprice〜)	Shinobu Yoshioka	Fumihiko Shimo	October 26, 2006
Yuichi reminisces about events of the past seven years ago concerning his first meeting with Ayu. Nayuki makes Yuichi return to school to retrieve her school notes she borrowed to him, and as he is leaving the premises, he runs into a third-year student, Mai Kawasumi, who is wielding a sword.
5	"Demon's Serenade"; Transliteration: "Mamonotachi no Sayokyoku ~serenade~" (Japanese: 魔物たちの小夜曲 〜serenade〜)	Yutaka Yamamoto	Fumihiko Shimo	November 3, 2006
Yuichi runs into Mai and her friend, Sayuri Kurata, who invites him to eat lunch with them. When Makoto goes to buy food for Akiko, she uses the money to buy volumes of manga and nikuman. While Yuichi wants to scold Makoto to make her learn her lesson, Akiko simply decides to give Makoto her own allowance.
6	"A Mysterious Divertimento"; Transliteration: "Nazodarake no Kiyūkyoku ~divertimento~" (Japanese: 謎だらけの嬉遊曲 〜divertimento〜)	Yasuhiro Takemoto	Fumihiko Shimo	November 10, 2006
Yuichi wants Makoto to get a job in order to become more of a social person who has more common sense. On the same day as her interview, Yuichi goes out with Ayu to watch a scary movie, even though Ayu is completely terrified of horror films.
7	"The Runaway and the Kitten's Fugue"; Transliteration: "Iede to Koneko no Tonsōkyoku ~fuga~" (Japanese: 家出と仔猫の遁走曲 〜fuga〜)	Kazuya Sakamoto	Fumihiko Shimo	November 17, 2006
Makoto starts her job working at a local nursery, and while walking home with Yuichi, they find a small, stray kitten, which is very affectionate towards Makoto. While talking on a bridge, Makoto drops the cat onto oncoming traffic, but it manages to survive. Yuichi gets angry at Makoto for this which causes Makoto to temporarily run away from home.
8	"The Fantasia of Reminiscence"; Transliteration: "Tsuioku no Gensōkyoku ~fantasie~" (Japanese: 追憶の幻想曲 〜fantasie〜)	Taichi Ishidate	Fumihiko Shimo	November 24, 2006
Yuichi starts to spend more and more time with Makoto, and they become closer. However, a girl named Mishio Amano gives him an ominous warning about Makoto, and Yuichi's memories begin to resurface about her true identity.
9	"The Berceuse of the Baby Fox"; Transliteration: "Kogitsune no Komoriuta ~berceuse~" (Japanese: 子狐の子守歌 〜berceuse〜)	Noriyuki Kitanohara	Fumihiko Shimo	December 1, 2006
Makoto's strength starts deteriorating as Yuichi finally remembers everything about her. As her condition is worsening, Yuichi begins skipping classes to spend more time with her, hoping to buy her more time.
10	"Requiem Atop the Hill"; Transliteration: "Oka no Ue no Chinkonka ~requiem~" (Japanese: 丘の上の鎮魂歌 〜requiem〜)	Shinobu Yoshioka	Fumihiko Shimo	December 8, 2006
Makoto's story finally comes to a resolution, while she spends her last moments bonding with her newly found family, and having all her wishes come true. Yuichi brings her to the place where she once belonged and performs a deep and personal ceremony for the two of them.
11	"Intermezzo of Light and Shadow"; Transliteration: "Hikari to Kage no Kansōkyoku ~intermezzo~" (Japanese: 光と影の間奏曲 〜intermezzo〜)	Yutaka Yamamoto	Fumihiko Shimo	December 15, 2006
Mai is called to the school's office, under the suspicion that she has broken one of the school's windows. Yuichi concludes that if Mai were more popular, she would not get into trouble as often, and invites her to the upcoming school ball. Ayu makes an appearance and is offered to stay in the Minase household.
12	"A Strange-Looking Waltz"; Transliteration: "Igyō no Enbukyoku ~waltz~" (Japanese: 異形の円舞曲 〜waltz〜)	Yasuhiro Takemoto	Fumihiko Shimo	December 22, 2006
Yuichi is starting to remember more about his past encounters with Ayu seven years ago, and the time he gave her a present, which he will grant three wishes for her. At school, Yuichi finally discovers that Shiori's surname is the same as Kaori Misaka, one of his classmates. He suspects they are siblings, though Kaori denies such a claim. As the school ball starts without a hitch, it is not long before a demon comes to attack.
13	"A Dangerous Trio"; Transliteration: "Abunage na Sanjūsō ~trio~" (Japanese: あぶなげな三重奏 〜trio〜)	Kazuya Sakamoto	Fumihiko Shimo	December 29, 2006
After what happened at the ball, the student council president Kuze attempts to get Mai expelled, and Yuichi tries to get her out of the situation. At the same time, Yuichi is not content with just standing by and watching Mai fight the demons alone and decides to help her anyway he can.
14	"A Cracked Concerto"; Transliteration: "Hibiwareta Kyōsōkyoku ~concerto~" (Japanese: ひびわれた協奏曲 〜concerto〜)	Taichi Ishidate	Fumihiko Shimo	January 5, 2007
Sayuri is starting to get more worried about Mai and Yuichi, which causes Mai to try to drive her away in order to protect her. On Mai's birthday, Sayuri meets with Yuichi in town and tells more about her family situation before she met Mai. Later that night, Sayuri goes to school to surprise Mai, but while there Sayuri is suddenly ambushed by the creatures roaming the school grounds.
15	"Sonatina of Hide-and-Go-Seek"; Transliteration: "Kakurenbo no Kosōmeikyoku ~sonatina~" (Japanese: かくれんぼの小奏鳴曲 〜sonatina〜)	Noriyuki Kitanohara	Fumihiko Shimo	January 12, 2007
Yuichi and Mai continue to battle the monsters, and when Yuichi is attacked, he is shown something he should not have forgotten years ago, which are the memories between him and Mai who has a mysterious power.
16	"Midnight Oratorio"; Transliteration: "Mayonaka no Seitankyoku ~oratorio~" (Japanese: 真夜中の聖譚曲 〜oratorio〜)	Shinobu Yoshioka	Fumihiko Shimo	January 18, 2007
Keeping his promise to Shiori, Yuichi offers to take her around town for the day to some of Shiori's favorite places. During the night, Shiori's older sister Kaori meets with Yuichi, explaining why she denies her sibling relationship, and the mystery behind Shiori's illness.
17	"Lieder ohne Worte of an Elder Sister and a Younger Sister"; Transliteration: "Ane to Imōto no Mugonka ~Lieder ohne worte~" (Japanese: 姉と妹の無言歌 〜Lieder ohne worte〜)	Noriko Takao	Fumihiko Shimo	January 26, 2007
With Shiori's birthday coming, Yuichi decides that he will try to do as much as he can for her, while she still has time. A week before her birthday, Shiori gets permission from her doctor to attend school for the remaining week, just like a regular student. Meanwhile, Kaori still insists on avoiding her, and warns Yuichi that Shiori might not survive long after her birthday passes.
18	"The Disappearing Adagio"; Transliteration: "Kiesari Yuku Kanjogakushō ~adagio~" (Japanese: 消え去りゆく緩徐楽章 〜adagio〜)	Yasuhiro Takemoto	Fumihiko Shimo	February 1, 2007
Shiori's birthday is days away and Yuichi wants to throw her a birthday party at a local café. He invites many students and classmates from school, along with Nayuki, Ayu, and even attempts to invite Kaori, who is reluctant to attend. As the minutes count down to midnight on her birthday, Yuichi and Shiori spend what could be their last moments together.
19	"The Étude of Contact"; Transliteration: "Fureai no Renshūkyoku ~étude~" (Japanese: ふれあいの練習曲 〜étude〜)	Kazuya Sakamoto	Fumihiko Shimo	February 8, 2007
The annual track meet tournament has come up, and Nayuki competes to win along with the rest of her teammates. A few days later, Yuichi again helps Ayu to try to find what she has been searching for, but they still cannot find it. Their time together in this endeavor brings the two of them closer than ever.
20	"The Nocturne of Farewell"; Transliteration: "Wakare no Yasōkyoku ~nocturn~" (Japanese: 別れの夜想曲 〜nocturn〜)	Taichi Ishidate	Fumihiko Shimo	February 15, 2007
As Yuichi and Ayu grow closer, Nayuki feels that she is being neglected by him. Ayu finally leads Yuichi to where her "school" is in the woods, but all they find is a large clearing with a tree stump in the center. The realization is too much for Ayu, and the unexpected happens right before Yuichi, in that she disappears.
21	"The Rondo Without You"; Transliteration: "Kimi no Inai Rinbukyoku ~ronde~" (Japanese: 君のいない輪舞曲 〜ronde〜)	Noriyuki Kitanohara	Fumihiko Shimo	February 22, 2007
Ayu still has not come back, and Yuichi continues to search for her and her lost item. In the meantime, Nayuki tries to cheer Yuichi up while trying to jog his memory about what happened between them seven years ago. However, Akiko becomes the victim of a car accident, which could lead to devastating results.
22	"Symphony of Recollections"; Transliteration: "Tsuisō no Kōkyōgaku ~symphony~" (Japanese: 追想の交響楽 〜symphony〜)	Shinobu Yoshioka	Fumihiko Shimo	March 1, 2007
As Akiko lies in the intensive care unit, Nayuki becomes deeply depressed. Locking herself in her bedroom, she refuses to leave. When she accidentally leaves her door unlocked, Yuichi uses the opportunity to talk with her, but she simply pushes him away. As Yuichi attempts to sleep it off, he dreams and remembers what happened to Ayu seven years ago. He leaves during a snow storm and heads for the woods, but soon collapses, and Makoto appears. When she kneels down to Yuichi's unconscious body, a bright light suddenly shines at them.
23	"The Scarlet Red Finale"; Transliteration: "Akane-iro no Shūkyoku ~finale~" (Japanese: 茜色の終曲 〜finale〜)	Kazuya Sakamoto	Fumihiko Shimo	March 8, 2007
Waking up in an apartment, Yuichi meets an old acquaintance who he admired as a child named Makoto Sawatari. Back at their promised place, Yuichi sees Ayu again, and she asks for her third and final wish to be for Yuichi to forget about her, but Yuichi is unwilling to grant it. Ayu then makes a different wish, and disappears soon after in Yuichi's arms. Nayuki comes out of her depression, and she attempts to get her cousin out of his own.
24	"Canon at the End of the Dream"; Transliteration: "Yume no Hate no Tsuifukukyoku ~kanon~" (Japanese: 夢の果ての追復曲 〜kanon〜)	Yasuhiro Takemoto	Fumihiko Shimo	March 15, 2007
A miracle occurs and everyone is healed of their illness or injury. Mai, Sayuri and Shiori return to school, while Akiko comes home. In a startling discovery, Akiko reveals to Yuichi on the events after Ayu's accident and Yuichi finally finds her, lying comatose in the hospital. As time goes on, everyone moves on with their lives, but Yuichi still clings to the hope that she will eventually wake up. However, he is still missing a final piece of his puzzle, before Ayu can truly end living in a dream. In the end, Ayu wakes up and is still together with Yuichi. Just before the closing credits, a familiar fox can be seen walking just beyond the stump, slightly blurred into the background.
