= Svalbard (disambiguation) =

Svalbard is an archipelago in the Arctic, part of Norway.

Svalbard may also refer to:

== Places ==
- Svalbarðshreppur, an Icelandic municipality
- Svalbarðsstrandarhreppur, an Icelandic municipality
- Svalbarðseyri, an Icelandic village, municipal seat of Svalbarðsstrandarhreppur
- Svalbard Global Seed Vault, a secure seedbank/gene bank located on the Norwegian island of Spitsbergen
- Svalbarð, a former name of Jan Mayen

== Bands ==
- Svalbard (band), an English post-hardcore band

== Ships ==
- NoCGV Svalbard, a Norwegian ship
- HNoMS Svalbard (aka MS Togo under German flag), a Norwegian troop and DP transport ship

== See also ==
- Spitzbergen (disambiguation)
