= Spitzbergen (disambiguation) =

Spitzbergen usually refers to the archipelago of Svalbard.

Spitzbergen or Spitsbergen may also refer to:

- Spitsbergen, the largest island of the Svalbard
- Montes Spitzbergen, a solitary mountain chain in the eastern Mare Imbrium of the Moon
- The Spitzbergen Current, a current that runs poleward just west of Spitsbergen
- A fictional organisation in episodes of No Guns Life
- Hunters of Spitzbergen, a wildlife documentary
- The Spitzbergen Raid
- Spitzbergen ice core
- Spitzbergen Mining and Exploration Syndicate

== See also ==
- Svalbard (disambiguation)
