= List of No Guns Life episodes =

Cover art for the first Blu-ray volume, featuring Juzo Inui

The anime television series No Guns Life is based on the manga series of the same name by Tasuku Karasuma. The series is animated by Madhouse, produced by Egg Firm and directed by Naoyuki Itō, with Yukie Sugawara handling series composition and Masanori Shino designing the characters. Kenji Kawai composed the series' music. The 3DCG backgrounds, as well as the second season's ending animation, were created by Cyclone Graphics using Unreal Engine 4.

The series ran for a total of 24 episodes in two seasons consisting of 12 episodes each, (Note: Despite English sources initially referring to the anime series in first and second parts instead of seasons, the anime's official website uses the notation ki (期), which is the direct Japanese equivalent to a season. Additionally, Crunchyroll's home media release of the series would later correctly refer to them as such.) having broadcast on TBS, AT-X, SUN, KBS, and BS11. The first season aired from October 10 to December 26, 2019. The second season was slated to premiere on April 9, 2020, but was delayed and instead aired from July 9 to September 24, 2020, due to effects attributed to the COVID-19 pandemic.

For the first season, the opening theme is "Motor City" performed by Kenichi Asai, while the ending theme is "Game Over" performed by DATS. For the second season, the opening theme is "Chaos Drifters" performed by SawanoHiroyuki[nZk] feat. Jean-Ken Johnny, while the ending theme is "new world" performed by This Is Japan. Crunchyroll licensed the series for simulcast and an English dub.

== Series overview ==
Season	Episodes	Originally released	
Season	Episodes	First released	Last released
1	12	October 10, 2019	December 26, 2019
2	12	July 9, 2020	September 24, 2020

== Episodes ==
=== Season 1 (2019) ===
No. overall	No. in season	Title (Note: English translated titles are taken from Crunchyroll.)	Directed by	Storyboarded by	Original release date
1	1	"Renegade Extended"; Transliteration: "Bōsō Kakuchōsha" (Japanese: 暴走拡張者)	Masaki Matsumura	Naoyuki Itō	October 10, 2019
In the near future after a great war where many humans have become cyborgs called the Extended, a Resolver named Juzo Inui leaves a bar after settling a case. Upon returning to his ransacked consultation office, Juzo finds a renegade Extended on the run from the Security Bureau chief named Rosso Bromwell, who is accusing the renegade Extended of abducting a boy named Tetsurō Arahabaki from a supposed orphanage owned by a research facility called the Berühren Corporation. Due to a request made by the renegade Extended, Juzo reluctantly agrees to protect Tetsurō. While taking Tetsurō to a safe place, Juzo is soon met by Karen, an operative from Berühren first disguised as a nun. Although the renegade Extended arrives to intervene, both he and Juzo are shot by Karen, who then recovers Tetsurō. Before passing out, the renegade Extended later reveals that he is actually Tetsurō using Harmony, an experimental and illegal Extended remote-control device installed in his human body, and that his vocal cords and limb tendons were severed by Berühren. Angered by how Tetsurō was treated as a guinea pig, Juzo derails an oncoming underground train which has Karen holding Tetsurō captive inside.
2	2	"Extended Remote-Control Device"; Transliteration: "Kakuchōtai Enkaku Sōsa Sōchi" (Japanese: 拡張体遠隔操作装置)	Nobuaki Nakanishi	Naoyuki Itō	October 17, 2019
After derailing the train, Juzo incapacitates Karen and rescues Tetsurō. The news reports that this incident is blamed on a terrorist group called Spitzbergen, and that Tetsurō is the eldest son of the Berühren CEO Soichiro Arahabaki. Juzo takes Tetsurō to the Kyusei Pit, a back-alley repair shop owned by an Extended engineer named Mary Steinberg, who analogizes that extensions are like a vehicle, the sub-brain is a driver's seat and the Extended's will is the driver. Because Harmony cannot be removed since it is implanted in Tetsurō's medulla oblongata, Mary agrees to install limb and vocal extensions on Tetsurō, but she cannot do anything until he regains consciousness. While trying to buy his favorite cigarette brand called Tanegashima from a cigarette machine, Juzo is apprehended by the Berühren chief of security Hugh Cunningham, who purposely bought out the Tanegashima cigarettes since they reduce stress on the nervous system for the Extended. Although Cunningham attempts to coerce Juzo into handing over Tetsurō, Juzo admits that he prefers the Tanegashima cigarettes for their taste. With Mary's assistance, Juzo forces Cunningham to flee. As Mary helps Juzo back to the Kyusei Pit, she reveals that Tetsurō has regained consciousness.
3	3	"Puppet"; Transliteration: "Ayatsuri Ningyō" (Japanese: 操り人形)	Ken Obata	Yoshiaki Kawajiri	October 24, 2019
Mary installs limb extensions on Tetsurō, but he is too weak to feed himself. Although Mary is unable to repair Tetsurō's vocal chords since Harmony is interfering with them, Juzo lends a head extension so Tetsurō can remotely speak. Juzo declines a request from a Kyusei Group mafia member named Huang, who asks Juzo to track down the culprit responsible for forcibly removing innocent children's limb extensions and publicly displaying them like puppets. Juzo believes that Berühren may be behind these attacks. Soon after, Tetsurō uses Harmony to remotely control Juzo and leaves in search of the culprit. Tetsurō comes across two sisters named Anne and Ende, who were sent by Berühren to lure out Tetsurō. Ende suddenly transforms into a spider-like Extended and sedates Tetsurō by firing poisonous bullets. This causes Ende to run rampant until Anne manages to calm down Ende and revert her to normal. As Anne later requests Cunningham to give medical attention to Ende, Cunningham sees both of them as disappointments for failing their mission. Just when Cunningham threatens to immediately retire Anne and Ende, Tetsurō suddenly intervenes.
4	4	"Trigger"; Transliteration: "Hikigane" (Japanese: 引き金)	Hideki Tonokatsu	Yoshiaki Kawajiri	October 31, 2019
Upon realizing that Tetsurō is remotely controlling Juzo's body, Cunningham orders Ende to disassemble Juzo's body and orders Anne to secure Tetsurō's body. When Anne and Ende hesitate to comply, Cunningham shoots Ende with drugged bullets in frustration before leaving. Ende goes berserk in her spider-like form and mortally wounds Anne, forcing Tetsurō to stop using Harmony on Juzo. Anne dies after pleading with Tetsurō to save Ende, though Tetsurō is unable to use Harmony on Ende since his sub-brain short-circuits. Juzo regains control of his body and informs Tetsurō that he was conscious the whole time. Using an elevator to escape Ende's wrath, Juzo orders Tetsurō to pull the trigger from his revolver head, which shoots an upward blast that destroys Ende's extensions. The blast travels through the shaft into the sky. In the aftermath, Juzo and Tetsurō are forced to leave the Kyusei Pit, while Mary will be making a counterprogram for the innocent children including Ende. After chastising Tetsurō for forcefully controlling his body, Juzo forbids Tetsurō from using Harmony on him ever again.
5	5	"EMS"; Transliteration: "Kakuchō-sha Taisaku-kyoku" (Japanese: 拡張者対策局)	Satoshi Matsubara	Naoyuki Itō	November 7, 2019
In Juzo's consultation office, Mary believes that the incident involving the upward blast will attract the attention of EMS, a branch of the Reconstruction Agency that plans countermeasures against the Extended. Tetsurō tries to storm out, but Juzo insists that Tetsurō should stay for his own protection. Juzo, Tetsurō and Mary are invited to eat crab with Juzo's landlord named Christina Matsuzaki, though Juzo abruptly leaves. After encountering his neighbor named Scarlett Gosling, Juzo meets with Scarlett's father, a barber who frequently services Juzo's head. The director of EMS named Olivier Vandeberme eventually takes Juzo, Tetsurō, Mary, Christina, Scarlett and Scarlett's father into custody in order to protect them from Berühren. Asking Juzo to apprehend two prisoners who escaped custody during transit, Olivier admits that EMS is forced to transfer prisoners to Berühren because it is the only licensed manufacturers of corsets, straitjackets which suppress the sub-brain. The motorcade is suddenly ambushed by the first escapee named Hug Bear, but he is swiftly stopped by the EMS section chief named Kronen von Wolf. Olivier tells Kronen that Juzo is needed to capture the final escapee named Hayden Gondry, who is the first recorded renegade Extended.
6	6	"Hero"; Transliteration: "Eiyū" (Japanese: 英雄)	Yoshihisa Matsumoto	Masaki Matsumura	November 14, 2019
With Juzo's friends held in custody, Olivier tasks Juzo with capturing Gondry, who is the infamous perpetrator of the Nightmare of Norse Scott, an incident where Gondry went berserk and committed mass murder on sixteen soldiers ten years ago. However, Gondry was incarcerated without trial due to his lost records, and he was responsible for three separate homicides when he recently escaped from prison. The number one priority is to capture Gondry alive and take him to court. Juzo later examines the home of Phillip le Carre, the third victim who was a high official in the Reconstruction Agency. After a brief skirmish with Kronen, Juzo realizes that Gondry is targeting his former colleagues, who were members of the first generation of the Extended called Tindalos. Juzo deduces that Gondry's next target is Tokisada Mega-Armed, a war hero who is the first Extended and a powerful businessman. Driving a vintage Corvette Stingray, Kronen takes Juzo to the End of War Commemoration Park for a public commemoration statue unveiling with Tokisada as the guest of honor. Juzo and Kronen are led astray by a decoy assassin, while Tokisada is later ambushed by Gondry, who cloaked himself as a young girl.
7	7	"Overheat"; Transliteration: "Kanetsu" (Japanese: 過熱)	Nobuaki Nakanishi	Naoyuki Itō	November 21, 2019
Olivier is suspended from her duties since she had a conflict of interest and went against the order of eliminating Gondry, who also murdered Olivier's father, one of the sixteen soldiers. Juzo and Kronen chase away Gondry when he attempts to attack Tokisada from behind. As Mary points out that Juzo may be running low on cigarettes, Tetsurō uses Harmony on an EMS soldier in order to deliver the cigarettes to Juzo. Although Kronen believes that the case should be abandoned, Juzo decides to keep his word to Olivier and capture Gondry alive. When Gondry attacks Tokisada again, Juzo and Kronen eventually collaborate in order to overheat and apprehend Gondry. Olivier is informed that the first victim, a delivery driver, was murdered differently that the other two victims. Tetsurō then asks Olivier to lead him to Juzo. With Gondry now defeated, Tokisada suddenly betrays Juzo and Kronen, stating that the details of the Nightmare of Norse Scott must never be made public in order to protect the reputation of extension technology. After knocking out Kronen, Tokisada begins to attack Juzo.
8	8	"Will"; Transliteration: "Ishi" (Japanese: 遺志)	Makoto Fuchigami	Naoyuki Itō	November 28, 2019
Olivier and Tetsurō arrive outside the End of War Commemoration Park. Tokisada tells Juzo that the five members of Tindalos basically sacrificed their bodies for advancing extension technology. After Tokisada explains that the war type model called the Gun Slave Unit was created during the great war, a weakened Juzo recalls his time during the great war. Juzo activates his restricted combat program, transforming himself into a monstrous form. Tokisada retreats after Juzo goes berserk and quickly overwhelms him. However, Olivier arrives in time to overhear Tokisada admitting that he orchestrated the Nightmare of Norse Scott by using Gondry to eliminate the sixteen soldiers and prevent its secrets from being revealed. With her suspicions confirmed, Olivier performs mouth-to-mouth resuscitation on Juzo by blowing smoke from one of the cigarettes delivered by Tetsurō. A revived Juzo finally gains the will to defeat Tokisada. Olivier opens a can of surströmming as a diversion so Juzo and Tetsurō can evade the arriving EMS soldiers. During transit, Olivier sends Tokisada's recorded confession to her superiors, but Tokisada notes how this is pointless. Tokisada is suddenly assassinated by a distant blast from a Gun Slave Unit named Seven, initiated by his handler named Pepper.
9	9	"Reverberation"; Transliteration: "Zankyō" (Japanese: 残響)	Taisuke Tsukuda	Hideki Tonokatsu	December 5, 2019
Cunningham reports that Gondry's prison escape was orchestrated to cover up Tokisada's murder of a Tindalos member, while Tokisada's assassination tied up loose ends. Berühren chief operating officer Honest and chief scientific officer Strange from the board of directors called Wurzel berate Cunningham for his indiscreet actions, giving him one more mission to redeem himself. Cunningham orders Pepper and Seven to lie low, though Pepper has developed an interest in Juzo. Mary soon moves her repair shop into Juzo's consultation office, where she tells Tetsurō that she is on the search for a military engineer. She then treats an immigrant named Colt, who pays Mary with a custom arm extension, as he promises that his next job will allow him to pay out his debt and provide surgery for his mother, who suffered nerve damage from an assistive walking device from Berühren. Suspecting that Colt is in a shady business, Tetsurō declines Colt's offer to join him in the next job. After Colt leaves, Mary realizes that the custom arm extension was built by her missing brother named Victor Steinberg. Rosso requests Juzo to apprehend a Spitzbergen member named Saryshagan, whom Colt may be involved with.
10	10	"Phantom Limb"; Transliteration: "Genshi" (Japanese: 幻肢)	Hideki Tonokatsu	Hideki Tonokatsu	December 12, 2019
After feeding his younger sisters and visiting his comatose mother, Colt sets off to carry out his next job. Mary tells Tetsurō that she did not account for Tetsurō taking back a tracker that she intentionally wanted Colt to steal. After an explosion during Tokisada's memorial service, Tetsurō uses Harmony on a security guard and spots Colt from a distance. At a bar, Juzo apprehends Saryshagan, who acted as the middleman to arrange a meeting between Colt and Spitzbergen. Tetsurō and Mary follow Colt to a nearby train station, where Colt was hired to detonate a bomb implanted on an evacuation train used for the Berühren executives. Although the detonator is destroyed in the crossfire, Colt manages to manually activate the timer. The security guards knew about this plan all along and switched the executives with innocent civilians in hopes of framing Spitzbergen. Tetsurō helps Colt dispose of the bomb, though Colt is shot numerous times in the process. Mary learns that Colt stole the custom arm extension from the black market. Colt then dies from his wounds when he reaches his home. Before Rosso takes Saryshagan into custody, Saryshagan taunts Juzo with mentioning that Victor is eager to see Juzo again.
11	11	"Owner"; Transliteration: "Shoyūsha" (Japanese: 所有者)	Nobuaki Nakanishi	Masaki Matsumura	December 19, 2019
Returning to the office, Juzo encounters Pepper waiting for her request to be granted, while Seven attacks Juzo from behind. Juzo notes that Pepper has a right arm extension called a Hands, a device exclusively used to release the control program on a Gun Slave Unit. Pepper admits that she has fallen in love with Juzo and wants to become his new owner. Juzo eventually loses his left arm when Pepper orders Seven to attack him. Upon arrival, Tetsurō is unable to use Harmony on Seven since his sub-brain short-circuits. Pepper and Seven retreat after realizing who Tetsurō really is. After telling Juzo that EMS has no intention of pursuing Pepper and Seven, Kronen warns Juzo that Berühren has silently retracted the search for Tetsurō. Juzo learns that Tetsurō may experience resonance from overusing Harmony, in which he takes the same damage as the Extended that he controls. Tetsurō blames himself for being unable to save anyone. A prosecutor named Danny Yoe hires Juzo to protect a girl named Rosa McMahon, who is apparently being haunted by a ghost. Mary tags along with Juzo as Danny takes them to a mansion.
12	12	"Specter"; Transliteration: "Bōrei" (Japanese: 亡霊)	Satoshi Matsubara	Masaki Matsumura	December 26, 2019
Rosa lost her left leg and her parents long ago in a car crash seemingly caused by a ghastly hand. Danny believes that a thief infiltrated the mansion even though Rosa is convinced that a phantom is lurking about. Juzo ascertains that the specter is a pair of Hands Extended. Mary learns that Rosa was given a pendant from her deceased father George McMahon. After Juzo confronts Danny for bugging Rosa's bedroom, Danny takes Rosa for a drive. Rosa points a gun at Danny, who admits that he orchestrated the car crash in order to obtain the pendant, but the Hands Extended saved her life. Danny prepares to shoot Rosa, but the Righty Hand Extended sacrifices itself in order to protect her. Able to gain ground, Juzo and Mary save Rosa from Danny. Mary learns that the pendant contains a data capsule, and Juzo loudly claims the data capsule as his reward. Juzo and Mary head back to the office, where Tetsurō is waiting. After realizing that Rosa will not be targeted again, Mary theorizes that the Hands Extended was hired by George to protect Rosa. Juzo shockingly discovers that the Lefty Hand Extended followed him to the office.

=== Season 2 (2020) ===
No. overall	No. in season	Title	Directed by	Storyboarded by	Original release date
13	1	"Turning Point"; Transliteration: "Tenkanten" (Japanese: 転換点)	Yoshihisa Matsumoto	Yoshiaki Kawajiri	July 9, 2020
Juzo Inui plays the data capsule, which contains a voice recording of Tokisada Mega-Armed confessing to his past crime. At the office, Mary Steinberg tries to determine if Lefty is being remotely controlled. Olivier Vandeberme suddenly calls the office with a warning moments before the office comes under attack by Spitzbergen. Both Christina Matsuzaki and Tetsurō Arahabaki end up getting captured as hostages, while Mary manages to escape. It turns out that Spitzbergen is seeking the data capsule which is currently in Juzo's possession. Lefty guides Mary to Victor Steinberg, who leaves after advising her to stay far away from the Extended. Juzo returns to the office and speaks with Olivier over the phone about the importance of Tokisada's recorded confession. Mary and Juzo are tracked down by the acting director of EMS named Avi Kobo, who is from the third public safety unit of the Reconstruction Agency. Avi is seeking Victor for his role in Spitzbergen. Victor is nicknamed the Dismantler for his ability to instantly pull apart bodies of the Extended. Juzo lies about having the data capsule in his possession, saying that he sold it for cheap. Tetsurō and Christina are taken to the headquarters of Spitzbergen.
14	2	"Client"; Transliteration: "Irainin" (Japanese: 依頼人)	Makoto Fuchigami	Yoshiaki Kawajiri	July 16, 2020
Juzo learns that Mary and Victor were orphans during childhood before being taken in by a temperamental engineer named Emmet. When Juzo and Mary are suddenly attacked by Spitzbergen, Juzo easily disables them and warns them to keep the hostages safe. It is revealed that Juzo's first client was Victor, who hired Juzo to protect Mary. Meanwhile, Spitzbergen member Kunugi introduces Tetsurō to Spitzbergen representative Andy Wachowski, a paraplegic who informs that Tetsurō was secretly used to fund the cause of Spitzbergen, which is to exploit extension technology. At the Kyusei Pit, Juzo and Mary encounter Lefty, leading Juzo to a hideout where Victor is surrounded by a troop of headless puppet soldiers. Juzo realizes that Victor was the one remotely controlling Lefty. Avi barges into the hideout, attempting to arrest Victor for murder and attempted murder and Juzo for aiding and abetting and obstruction of justice. However, Victor fights back with long-range sickle-like limb extensions sprawling from the core of his body, while Juzo is saved by Lefty sacrificing itself in the process. Victor then seizes Mary and threatens to dismantle Juzo in order to analyze his body, but Juzo is determined to fight Victor and continue protecting Mary.
15	3	"A Place to Call Home"; Transliteration: "Ibasho" (Japanese: 居場所)	Hideki Hosokawa	Masashi Kojima	July 23, 2020
As he attacks Juzo, Victor quickly gains the upper hand while remotely controlling the headless puppet soldiers. After Mary distracts Victor with concealed rockets, Juzo gives up his right arm in order to grab Victor by the teeth. Mary then pull the trigger from Juzo's revolver head, which destroys Victor at point-blank range. However, Victor communicates through Lefty and reveals that his shadow self was controlling a puppet of his. During the great war, Victor created a parallel sub-brain which can remotely control puppet soldiers. He witnessed the brutal results of his research on the battlefield, briefly wishing for all of the Extended to be purged from the world. His own parallel sub-brain hijacked his body while he laid in shock, destroying the research lab and pursuing its goal of purging all of the Extended. Before Lefty is disconnected, Victor asks Juzo to find and destroy his real body with the faulty parallel sub-brain. Suddenly reappearing with rapid gunfire, Avi arrests Juzo and Mary in order to prevent them from finding and destroying Victor's real body, proclaiming that it will be his job.
16	4	"Engineer"; Transliteration: "Gishi" (Japanese: 技師)	Hideki Tonokatsu	Masashi Kojima	July 30, 2020
After finding another puppet remotely controlled by Victor's shadow, Avi holds Mary hostage. Avi's skin is installed with sensor extensions similar to the ampullae of Lorenzini which can predict movements and evade attacks. After Avi shoots Mary in the foot, Juzo angrily activates his restricted combat program and replaces his severed arms. Juzo joins forces with Victor's shadow in order to release Mary and knock out Avi. Mary privately tells Victor's shadow that he was born from Victor's hubris, the arrogance of creating extensions to improve humanity. Olivier arrives and relieves Avi of his duties on the suspicion of secretly collaborating with Spitzbergen. Mary rewires Victor's shadow, who leaves after assuring Mary that Tetsurō will be safe with Spitzbergen. Back at the office, Mary repairs Lefty but there is no lead on the location of Victor's real body. At the headquarters of Spitzbergen, Tetsurō recognizes Wachowski as the father of extension technology, learning that Wachowski wants to eliminate Seven, the greatest obstacle for Spitzbergen. Wachowski threatens the safety of Tetsurō's friends if Tetsurō refuses to cooperate by using Harmony in order to force Juzo to give up his will and fully activate his restricted combat program.
17	5	"Noble Rot"; Transliteration: "Kifu" (Japanese: 貴腐)	Nobuaki Nakanishi	Yurie Kuniyuki	August 6, 2020
Revealing to Juzo that Tetsurō and Christina are in the custody of EMS after being released by Spitzbergen, Olivier fails to convince Juzo to hand over the data capsule. After talking with Mary, a lovestruck Rosa McMahon misreads the situation when she sees Juzo with Olivier in the office. This is observed by a tracker named John Podpie, who is shown with eye extensions. Juzo gets his head serviced when he visits Scarlett Gosling and her father at the barbershop. Podpie enters the barbershop and secretly uses his eye extensions in order to scan provocative images of Scarlett. He develops a massive nosebleed when she shampoos his hair. When Mary enters the barbershop, she realizes that Podpie is a voyeur and punches him in the face. Mary views the extracted provocative images, noting that Podpie has X-ray vision. Admitting that he was a former Security Bureau data analyst, Podpie was fired for being unable to control his impulses. Podpie runs off after being released, though Juzo warns him never to abuse his ability again. Mary learns that Juzo was formerly part of the Noble Rot, composed of soldiers who dropped to rock bottom for the sake of their country.
18	6	"Traces of Crime"; Transliteration: "Zaiseki" (Japanese: 罪跡)	Satoshi Matsubara	Yoshiaki Kawajiri	August 13, 2020
After managing to escape custody of EMS, Tetsurō returns to the office, where Juzo learns that Spitzbergen arranged a procedure to install a new voice box implant in Tetsurō so he can speak normally. A woman named Emma Kurtz hires Juzo to find her husband named Edmund Baker, who has a motorcycle headlight and handlebars for a head and a new arm extension. Emma mentions that Edmund prevented her from committing suicide after the death of her former fiancé named Theodore. Tagging along with Juzo to find Edmund, Tetsurō has conflicted thoughts about honoring Wachowski's request. Juzo discovers that Edmund's military file is restricted like his own. Meanwhile, Mary comes across Edmund in an alleyway and patches him up in the office. When Juzo and Tetsurō return to the office, Edmund takes Juzo outside and immediately attacks him at full force. Edmund mistakes Juzo of being a Gun Slave Unit named Five, Edmund's former partner who was hunting him down. Arriving at the scene, Tetsurō reveals that Juzo was being set up as bait while Emma admits knowing that Edmund was Theodore all along. Juzo then reveals that he already killed Five six years ago.
19	7	"Scar"; Transliteration: "Hankon" (Japanese: 瘢痕(はんこん))	Yoshihisa Matsumoto	Yoshiaki Kawajiri	August 20, 2020
Mary recognizes Tetsurō's new voice box implant as Victor's handiwork. Revealed to be Five's Hands operator, Edmund was ordered to hand over Five to the military after the great war six years ago. Although the military planned to dispose of him, Five went AWOL and started a rebellion, though Juzo was hired to suppress it. Tetsurō tells Mary that only four out of thirteen Gun Slave Units still exist after surviving the great war. Still conflicted about whether to use Hamony on Juzo, Tetsurō admits his involvement with Spitzbergen, though Juzo tells Tetsurō that he gets the freedom to determine his own fate. Pepper and Seven are assigned a new mission by Hugh Cunningham. As Kunugi begins to question Wachowski's motives, Juzo arrives at the headquarters of Spitzbergen carrying Tetsurō's unconscious body, apparently under the control of Harmony. Wachowski explains that his brother Lawrence lost his legs in the great war due to a train derailment. Having dedicating himself as the progenitor of extension technology, Wachowski believed that Berühren operated with impunity. Wachowski hopes that Tetsurō will use Harmony in order to remove Juzo's limiter, which would allow Juzo to reach his full potential and defeat Seven.
20	8	"I'm Dreaming"; Transliteration: "Esoragoto" (Japanese: 絵空事)	Makoto Fuchigami	Makoto Fuchigami	August 27, 2020
In the upper level, Wachowski soon learns that Tetsurō used Harmony in order to hack into his own sub-brain, meaning that Juzo was never under the control of Harmony. Demanding that Spitzbergen should stop committing acts of terrorism, Tetsurō offers to use Harmony in order to defeat Seven in exchange. Wachowski explains that Berühren solely focused on research and development before the takeover by Wurzel, and that Spitzbergen was formed as a refuge but gradually became an anti-extension terrorist group in degeneration. In the lower level, Kunugi fires bullets from his needle gun onto the back of Juzo, who is temporarily restrained as a result. Wachowski reveals that Juzo has a special feature built inside him which can only be activated by Harmony in order to destroy Wurzel. As Tetsurō refuses to allow Juzo to be exploited, Wachowski frustratingly rises from his wheelchair, revealing himself as an Extended. Wachowski attacks Tetsurō with his weaponized extensions, while Juzo picks a fight with Kunugi.
21	9	"Degeneration"; Transliteration: "Henshitsu" (Japanese: 変質)	Hideki Hosokawa	Makoto Fuchigami	September 3, 2020
After removing his own limiter by using Harmony on himself, Tetsurō manages to defeat Wachowski, despite being punctured in the chest. When Tetsurō staggers away, Wachowski is beheaded by an unknown assailant. Kunugi shoots Spitzbergen member Shimazu with special bullets, which causes strength augmentation and reveals Shimazu as a woman. Overcoming the side effects of Kunugi's bullets by swallowing a whole pack of cigarettes, Juzo manages to defeat Shimazu. Kunugi reveals that his sponsor is Cunningham, and that Berühren has funded Spitzbergen as a tool to promote acts of terrorism and increase public fear, which allows Berühren to sanction continued research and development of extension technology. Pepper appears and protects Kunugi from Shimazu, who was angry that Kunugi is exploiting Spitzbergen. Arriving with Wachowski's head in tow, Seven follows Pepper's instructions to attack Juzo. After Juzo activates his restricted combat program, Pepper removes Seven's limiter and states that she wants to control Juzo as well. While Juzo and Seven duke it out, Kunugi leaves the scene and stumbles upon Tetsurō in the basement. Kunugi is intercepted by his former colleague Kronen von Wolf, who prepares to apprehend Kunugi for his acts of terrorism.
22	10	"Imprisoning Binds"; Transliteration: "Ka'sa" (Japanese: 枷鎖(かさ))	Makoto Fuchigami	Yoshiaki Kawajiri	September 10, 2020
Kronen and Kunugi are equally matched in their fight, but Juzo suddenly falls through the ceiling above, allowing Kunugi to escape from Kronen's sight. In pursuit of Juzo, Seven emits a mighty blast from his semi-automatic pistol head. Although Juzo cannot fully activate his Devil's Backbone, structurally compressed vertebral coupling bays, without the authorization of a Hands operator, he refuses to join Pepper. When Tetsurō is carried in by Kronen, Tetsurō decides to break his promise and use Harmony on Juzo. Tetsurō finds himself inside Juzo's mind, where he has access to Juzo's trigger. Juzo's memories are revealed of when he and his former partner were on a mission to eliminate the eleven renegade Gun Slave Units. A fellow Gun Slave Unit named Twelve explained that the rebellion is falling apart and he tried to persuade Juzo in joining the rebellion. Juzo told Twelve about an abandoned construction tunnel southwest of town, which would set them free from the military. However, Juzo lured out his comrades so he could blast them out in one fell swoop from a clock tower. This also marked the time when Juzo became free to make his own decisions.
23	11	"Trigger (Again)"; Transliteration: "Hikigane (Futatabi)" (Japanese: 引(ひ)き金(がね)（再(ふたたび)）)	Hideki Tonokatsu & Naoyuki Itō	Naoyuki Itō	September 17, 2020
As Kronen fights back against Pepper and Seven, they are interrupted by a squadron of Berühren soldiers mobilized by a panicked Cunningham. Seven escapes with Pepper to the rooftop, but the building is surrounded by EMS soldiers holding back witnessing civilians. In a bid to be a spectacle, Pepper orders Seven to destroy everything, but Pepper gets shot and passes out while losing her Hands operating right arm. Seven prepares to implement Pepper's order, while Kronen is unable to attack at far range. Meanwhile, Tetsurō convinces Juzo to pull his trigger for his own sake. Seven is stopped when Juzo pulls his own trigger, revealing that Tetsurō enabled Juzo to overcome his limiter. Juzo tells Seven that he became a Resolver after the great war, but he gained his resolve from meeting Tetsurō. After Juzo asks Seven what he really wants, the two engage in a fierce fight which demolishes the commemoration statue. Wurzel observes the fight from the chamber, in which chief medical officer Timid notes that Harmony has exceed expectations while chief technology officer Dreamy notes that they remained unsuccessful at duplicating Harmony. Although Strange wants to act immediately, Honest wishes to observe Harmony a little longer.
24	12	"Earnest Desire"; Transliteration: "Koinegau" (Japanese: 冀(こいねが)う)	Satoshi Matsubara	Masaki Matsumura & Naoyuki Itō	September 24, 2020
In the past, Pepper was imprisoned alongside her sister Karen by Berühren, where Cunningham first introduced Pepper to Seven. Aside from being informed about Seven's fragile mental state, Pepper agreed to be Seven's Hands operator in hopes of owning him. In the present, Mary treats Shimazu at the office, while Juzo visits Pepper at the Reconstruction Agency Holy Church Hospital as a favor from Olivier. After Juzo recovers Pepper from an attempted escape, Pepper is upset that Seven left her. It is revealed that Seven hired Juzo to take care of Pepper after Seven was captured by Mathilda and Imelda, the Berühren twin secretaries of Wurzel. Juzo explains that Seven stayed by Pepper's side instead of just being a sidearm. Olivier notes that her superiors have been colluding with Berühren. Back in her quarters, Pepper receives two lollipops and Seven's coat as her belongings. Juzo recalls that his former partner encouraged him to live out his life after the great war. As Tetsurō and Mary walks with Juzo from the hospital, Juzo comments that he will be up against a monster as he looks at the headquarters of Berühren from a distance.

== Home media release ==
=== Japanese ===
Sony Pictures Entertainment (Japan – Region 2/A)
Box		Episodes	Release date	Ref.
Season 1	1	1–6	February 26, 2020	
Season 1	2	7–12	April 22, 2020	
Season 2	3	13–18	September 30, 2020	
Season 2	4	19–24	October 28, 2020	

=== English ===
Crunchyroll LLC (North America – Region 1/A)
Season	Episodes	Release date	Ref.
1	1–12	January 26, 2021	
2	13–24	June 22, 2021	
