= Music of Kanon =

Music from the visual novel Kanon

Kanon discography
- Soundtrack albums: 3
- Compilation albums: 1
- Singles: 3
- Remixes: 3

Kanon is a visual novel developed by Key and published by VisualArt's in 1999. The story follows Yuichi Aizawa, who has returned to the town where seven years ago he would spend his school vacations, but has forgotten many of the details regarding his previous visits. Over the course of the series, Yuichi slowly regains these memories as he meets new friends and is reacquainted with others from his past. It was adapted by Toei Animation into a 13-episode anime television series broadcast in 2002 along with an accompanying original video animation episode released in 2003, both directed by Takamichi Itō with music direction by Hiroyuki Kōzu. Kyoto Animation also adapted it into a 24-episode anime television series broadcast between 2006 and 2007 directed by Tatsuya Ishihara with music direction by Shinji Orito. The discography of Kanon and its anime adaptations consists of one compilation album, three singles, three soundtracks, and three remix albums.

The core of the discography is the three original soundtrack albums. The visual novel's soundtrack, which was also used for the second anime series, was produced by Key Sounds Label and released in 2002. The music on the soundtrack was composed and arranged by Jun Maeda, Shinji Orito and OdiakeS. Two soundtracks were released for the first anime series in 2002 produced by Movic. The music on the anime soundtracks was composed and arranged by Hiroyuki Kōzu, Kōji Ueno, and Shinji Orito. Two remix albums were released for the visual novel in 1999 and 2003, and a remix album was released for the first anime series in 2003. A compilation album for the visual novel featuring previously released remixes was released in 2001. Three singles were released, one each for the visual novel and both anime series, covering the opening and endings themes of each media type.

== Albums ==
=== Anemoscope ===
Anemoscope is an arrange album released by Key for the Kanon visual novel, and was packaged with the first edition of the Kanon visual novel on June 4, 1999. Ten of the twelve tracks on the album are arrange versions of background music featured in the visual novel, with the last two being the original versions of the game's two main theme songs "Last regrets" and "Kaze no Tadoritsuku Basho" sung by Ayana. The ten tracks were arranged by Shinji Orito, Magome Togoshi, and Kazuya Takase of I've Sound.

Track listing
No.	Title	Music	Arrangement	Length
1.	"Pure Snows"	Shinji Orito	Magome Togoshi	4:22
2.	"Last regrets" (Lyrics by Jun Maeda; Performed by Ayana)	Jun Maeda	Kazuya Takase (I've Sound)	6:12
3.	"Shōjo no Ori" (少女の檻 Girls' Prison)	OdiakeS	Shinji Orito	3:10
4.	"Kaze o Matta Hi" (風を待った日 The Day When I Waited for the Wind)	Shinji Orito	Magome Togoshi	5:45
5.	"Yuki no Shōjo" (雪の少女 Girl in the Snow)	Shinji Orito	Magome Togoshi	3:41
6.	"Tōdo Kōgen" (凍土高原 Tundra Plateau)	Shinji Orito	Magome Togoshi	3:59
7.	"Hidamari no Machi" (日溜りの街 A Sunny City)	Shinji Orito	Magome Togoshi	5:47
8.	"The Fox and the Grapes"	OdiakeS	Shinji Orito	4:15
9.	"Kigi no Koe to Hibi no Zawameki" (木々の声と日々のざわめき The Voices of Trees and the Bustling of Days)	Shinji Orito	Magome Togoshi	3:35
10.	"Egao no Mukōgawa ni" (笑顔の向こう側に Beyond the Smile)	Shinji Orito	Magome Togoshi	3:12
11.	"Umaretate no Kaze" (生まれたての風 A Newborn Wind)	Shinji Orito	Magome Togoshi	4:39
12.	"Kaze no Tadoritsuku Basho" (風の辿り着く場所 Where the Wind Reaches) (Lyrics by Jun Maeda; Performed by Ayana)	Shinji Orito	Kazuya Takase (I've Sound)	6:08
Total length:				54:47

=== Recollections ===
Recollections is a best arrange album for the Kanon visual novel, and was first released on December 29, 2001, at Comiket 61 in Japan by Key Sounds Label bearing the catalog number KSLA-0003, and was widely distributed on November 29, 2002. The album contains one disc with thirteen tracks which primarily takes tracks from the first two albums released for the Kanon visual novel, Anemoscope and "Last regrets/Place of wind which arrives"; seven are from the former, and three are from the latter. The album also contains three new arrangements of songs featured in the Kanon visual novel: two background music tracks, and a remix of the game's opening theme "Last regrets" as an acoustic version sung by Lia. The tracks on the album were arranged by Shinji Orito, Magome Togoshi, and Ryō Okabe.

Track listing
No.	Title	Music	Arrangement	Length
1.	"Pure Snows" (from Anemoscope)	Shinji Orito	Magome Togoshi	4:26
2.	"Last regrets (acoustic version)" (Lyrics by Jun Maeda; Performed by Lia; new arrange)	Jun Maeda	Ryō Okabe	6:31
3.	"Asakage" (朝影 Morning Lights; from single "Last regrets")	Shinji Orito	Magome Togoshi	5:27
4.	"The Fox and the Grapes" (from Anemoscope)	OdiakeS	Shinji Orito	4:16
5.	"Shōjo no Ori" (少女の檻 Girls' Prison; from Anemoscope)	OdiakeS	Shinji Orito	3:10
6.	"Hidamari no Machi" (日溜まりの街 A Sunny City; from Anemoscope)	Shinji Orito	Magome Togoshi	5:59
7.	"Fuyu no Hanabi" (冬の花火 Winter Fireworks; from single "Last regrets")	Jun Maeda	Shinji Orito	3:41
8.	"Kanojotachi no Kenkai" (彼女たちの見解 The Girls' Opinions; new arrange)	Shinji Orito	Magome Togoshi	6:53
9.	"Kaze o Matta Hi" (風を待った日 The Day When I Waited for the Wind; from Anemoscope)	Shinji Orito	Magome Togoshi	6:09
10.	"Tōdo Kōgen" (凍土高原 Tundra Plateau; from Anemoscope)	Shinji Orito	Magome Togoshi	4:01
11.	"Zankō" (残光 Afterglow; new arrange)	Jun Maeda	Shinji Orito	3:53
12.	"Umaretate no Kaze" (生まれたての風 A Newborn Wind; from Anemoscope)	Shinji Orito	Magome Togoshi	5:40
13.	"Little fragments" (from single "Last regrets")	Shinji Orito	Magome Togoshi	4:25
Total length:				64:20

=== Kanon Original Soundtrack ===
The Kanon Original Soundtrack, from the visual novel Kanon, was first released on October 25, 2002, in Japan by Key Sounds Label bearing the catalog number KSLA-0006. The soundtrack contains one disc totaling twenty-four songs composed, arranged, and produced by Jun Maeda, Shinji Orito, OdiakeS, and Kazuya Takase of I've Sound. Ayana provides vocals for two songs, "Last regrets" and "Kaze no Tadoritsuku Basho". The first half of the last track is the short version of "Kaze no Tadoritsuku Basho", and after a lengthy pause a hidden track of an arrange version of "Yuki no Shōjo" plays which was originally featured in the album Anemoscope.

Track listing
No.	Title	Music	Length
1.	"Asakage" (朝影 Morning Lights)	Shinji Orito	1:55
2.	"Yume no Ato" (夢の跡 Remnants of a Dream)	Jun Maeda	2:09
3.	"Last regrets (Full Chorus Version)" (Lyrics by Jun Maeda; Arrangement by Kazuya Takase (I've Sound); Performed by Ayana)	Jun Maeda	6:15
4.	"Yakusoku" (約束 Promise)	Shinji Orito	3:10
5.	"2 steps toward"	Shinji Orito	2:50
6.	"Kigi no Koe to Hibi no Zawameki" (木々の声と日々のざわめき The Voices of Trees and the Bustle of Days)	Shinji Orito	3:23
7.	"Kanojotachi no Kenkai" (彼女たちの見解 The Girls' Opinions)	Shinji Orito	2:44
8.	"Pure Snows"	Shinji Orito	2:40
9.	"Yuki no Shōjo" (雪の少女 Girl in the Snow)	Shinji Orito	1:42
10.	"Hidamari no Machi" (日溜りの街 A Sunny City)	Shinji Orito	3:04
11.	"Egao no Mukōgawa ni" (笑顔の向こう側に Beyond the Smile)	Shinji Orito	2:54
12.	"The Fox and the Grapes"	OdiakeS	1:34
13.	"Shōjo no Ori" (少女の檻 Girls' Prison)	OdiakeS	1:38
14.	"Kizashi" (兆し Omen)	Shinji Orito	2:04
15.	"Fuyu no Hanabi" (冬の花火 Winter Fireworks)	Jun Maeda	2:04
16.	"Mukai" (霧海 Sea of Mist)	OdiakeS	1:45
17.	"Tōdo Kōgen" (凍土高原 Tundra Plateau)	Shinji Orito	4:01
18.	"Zankō" (残光 Afterglow)	Jun Maeda	1:58
19.	"Kaze o Matta Hi" (風を待った日 The Day When I Waited for the Wind)	Shinji Orito	3:17
20.	"Umaretate no Kaze" (生まれたての風 A Newborn Wind)	Shinji Orito	4:00
21.	"Kaze no Tadoritsuku Basho (Full Chorus Version)" (風の辿り着く場所 Where the Wind Reaches) (Lyrics by Jun Maeda; Arrangement by Kazuya Takase (I've Sound); Performed by Ayana)	Shinji Orito	6:12
22.	"Little fragments"	Shinji Orito	2:04
23.	"Last regrets" (Short Version)" (Lyrics by Jun Maeda; Arrangement by Kazuya Takase (I've Sound); Performed by Ayana)	Jun Maeda	2:32
24.	"Kaze no Tadoritsuku Basho (Short Version)" (風の辿り着く場所 Where the Wind Reaches) (Lyrics by Jun Maeda; Arrangement by Kazuya Takase (I've Sound); Performed by Ayana)	Shinji Orito	7:55
Total length:			75:14

=== Re-feel ===
Re-feel is a piano arrange album with songs taken from the Kanon and Air visual novels and arranged into piano versions. It was first released on December 28, 2003, at Comiket 65 in Japan by Key Sounds Label bearing the catalog number KSLA-0010. The album contains one disc with ten tracks; the first five songs are from Kanon while the last five are from Air. With the exception of tracks two and four which are arranged by Riya of Eufonius, all the tracks are arranged by Ryō Mizutsuki, who is credited as Kiyo on the album.

Track listing
No.	Title	Music	Arrangement	Length
1.	"Yakusoku" (約束 Promise)	Shinji Orito	Ryō Mizutsuki	4:01
2.	"Shōjo no Ori" (少女の檻 Girls' Prison)	OdiakeS	Riya	4:18
3.	"Pure Snows"	Shinji Orito	Ryō Mizutsuki	3:39
4.	"Yume no Ato" (夢の跡 Remnants of a Dream)	Jun Maeda	Riya	3:24
5.	"Zankō" (残光 Afterglow)	Jun Maeda	Ryō Mizutsuki	4:14
6.	"Natsukage" (夏影 Summer Lights)	Jun Maeda	Ryō Mizutsuki	3:16
7.	"Denshō" (伝承 Tradition)	Magome Togoshi	Ryō Mizutsuki	4:18
8.	"Aozora" (青空 Blue Skies)	Jun Maeda	Ryō Mizutsuki	5:33
9.	"Yumegatari" (夢語り Speaking of Dreams)	Shinji Orito	Ryō Mizutsuki	4:39
10.	"Tori no Uta" (鳥の詩 Bird's Poem)	Shinji Orito	Ryō Mizutsuki	4:11
Total length:				41:33

=== TV Animation Edition Kanon Soundtrack Volume 1 ===
TV Animation Edition Kanon Soundtrack Volume 1 is the first original soundtrack released for the first Kanon anime series and was released on May 5, 2002, in Japan by Movic bearing the catalog number MACM-1155. The soundtrack contains one disc totaling thirty-one songs composed, arranged, and produced by Shinji Orito, Jun Maeda, OdiakeS, Kōji Ueno, and Hiroyuki Kōzu. Miho Fujiwara provides vocals for two songs, "Florescence" and "Flower". Some of the tracks are new arrangements of music featured in the Kanon visual novel. The first edition release of the soundtrack came in a tall case, the same type for a DVD.

All songs arranged by Hiroyuki Kōzu.

Track listing
No.	Title	Music	Length
1.	"Yakusoku I" (約束 Promise)	Shinji Orito	0:23
2.	"Florescence TV edition" (Lyrics by Naomi Kosaka; Performed by Miho Fujiwara)	Kōji Ueno	0:31
3.	"Yume no Ato I" (夢の跡 Remnants of a Dream)	Jun Maeda	2:38
4.	"Nayuki Minase" (水瀬名雪 Minase Nayuki)	Hiroyuki Kōzu	2:49
5.	"Kita kara Hakobareru Kaze" (北から運ばれる風 The Wind Carried from the North)	Hiroyuki Kōzu	1:35
6.	"Itsumo no Michi de" (いつもの道で On the Usual Road)	Hiroyuki Kōzu	1:40
7.	"Fuyu no Hanabi I" (冬の花火 Winter Fireworks)	Jun Maeda	2:08
8.	"Machi de" (街で In the City)	Hiroyuki Kōzu	1:44
9.	"Ayu Tsukimiya" (月宮あゆ Tsukimiya Ayu)	Hiroyuki Kōzu	1:52
10.	"Kaze o Matta Hi I" (風を待った日 The Day When I Waited for the Wind)	Shinji Orito	3:21
11.	"Hazumu Kimochi" (弾む気持ち Lively Feelings)	Hiroyuki Kōzu	1:35
12.	"Kanojo no Iru Fūkei" (彼女のいる風景 The Scenery Where She Exists)	Hiroyuki Kōzu	1:48
13.	"Shiori Misaka" (美坂栞 Misaka Shiori)	Hiroyuki Kōzu	1:36
14.	"Mai Kawasumi" (川澄舞 Kawasumi Mai)	Hiroyuki Kōzu	1:46
15.	"Kokoro no Sukima" (心の隙間 Crevice of the Heart)	Hiroyuki Kōzu	1:48
16.	"Shizuka na Kanashimi" (静かな悲しみ A Quiet Sadness)	Hiroyuki Kōzu	1:41
17.	"Jijō" (事情 Event)	Hiroyuki Kōzu	1:33
18.	"Makoto Sawatari" (沢渡真琴 Sawatari Makoto)	Hiroyuki Kōzu	1:54
19.	"Sepiairo no Kodō" (セピア色の鼓動 Sepia Heartbeats)	Hiroyuki Kōzu	1:54
20.	"Maiochiru Fuan" (舞い落ちる不安 An Alighting Anxiety)	Hiroyuki Kōzu	1:54
21.	"Kaze o Matta Hi II" (風を待った日 The Day When I Waited for the Wind)	Shinji Orito	1:41
22.	"Mukai I" (霧海 Sea of Mist)	OdiakeS	1:42
23.	"Munasawagi" (胸騒ぎ Apprehension)	Hiroyuki Kōzu	1:50
24.	"Yami ni Hisomu Kage" (闇に潜む影 The Shadow that Lurks in the Darkness)	Hiroyuki Kōzu	1:38
25.	"Takanaru Omoi" (高鳴る想い Throbbing Thoughts)	Hiroyuki Kōzu	1:49
26.	"Time Suspense I"	Hiroyuki Kōzu	2:21
27.	"Umaretate no Asa" (生まれたての朝 A Newborn Morning)	Shinji Orito	2:02
28.	"Florescence (Softly Ver.)" (Lyrics by Naomi Kosaka; Performed by Miho Fujiwara)	Kōji Ueno	2:13
29.	"Flower (TV edition)" (Lyrics by Naomi Kosaka; Performed by Miho Fujiwara)	Masato Kamato	1:25
30.	"Florescence (TV edition Special Ver.)" (Lyrics by Naomi Kosaka; Performed by Miho Fujiwara)	Kōji Ueno	1:48
31.	"Yakusoku II" (約束 Promise)	Shinji Orito	1:48
Total length:			56:27

=== TV Animation Edition Kanon Soundtrack Volume 2 ===
TV Animation Version Kanon Soundtrack Volume 2 is the second original soundtrack released for the first Kanon anime series and was released on July 5, 2002, in Japan by Movic bearing the catalog number MACM-1156. The soundtrack contains two discs totaling fifty-five songs composed, arranged, and produced by Shinji Orito, Jun Maeda, OdiakeS, Kōji Ueno, and Hiroyuki Kōzu. Miho Fujiwara provides vocals for two songs, "Florescence" and "Flower". Some of the tracks are new arrangements of music featured in the Kanon visual novel.

All songs arranged by Hiroyuki Kōzu.

Disc 1
No.	Title	Music	Length
1.	"Florescence preview ver." (Lyrics by Naomi Kosaka; Performed by Miho Fujiwara)	Kōji Ueno	0:34
2.	"Yume no Ato II" (夢の跡 Remnants of a Dream)	Jun Maeda	2:38
3.	"Yume no Ato music box I" (夢の跡 Remnants of a Dream)	Jun Maeda	2:27
4.	"Nayuki Minase II" (水瀬名雪 Minase Nayuki)	Hiroyuki Kōzu	2:33
5.	"Yume no Ato plus strings I" (夢の跡 Remnants of a Dream)	Jun Maeda	2:57
6.	"Time Suspense II"	Hiroyuki Kōzu	2:31
7.	"Zenchō" (前兆 Omen)	Hiroyuki Kōzu	1:36
8.	"Mukai orchestra I" (霧海 Sea of Mist)	OdiakeS	1:58
9.	"Butōkai" (舞踏会 Dance Party)	Hiroyuki Kōzu	3:35
10.	"Ketsui" (決意 Determination)	Hiroyuki Kōzu	1:49
11.	"Hazumu Kimochi II" (弾む気持ち Lively Feelings)	Hiroyuki Kōzu	1:42
12.	"Yume no Ato plus strings II" (夢の跡 Remnants of a Dream)	Jun Maeda	2:38
13.	"Flower softly ver." (Lyrics by Naomi Kosaka; Performed by Miho Fujiwara)	Masato Kamato	2:41
14.	"Taiji" (対峙 Confrontation)	Hiroyuki Kōzu	2:39
15.	"Mamono o Utsumono I" (魔物を討つ者 Demon Slayer)	Hiroyuki Kōzu	4:20
16.	"Florescence painful ver." (Lyrics by Naomi Kosaka; Performed by Miho Fujiwara)	Kōji Ueno	2:16
17.	"Yasuragi no Shunkan" (安らぎの瞬間 A Moment of Peace)	Hiroyuki Kōzu	1:53
18.	"Semari Kuru Kage" (迫り来る影 An Approaching Shadow)	Hiroyuki Kōzu	2:22
19.	"Mamono o Utsumono II" (魔物を討つ者 Demon Slayer)	Hiroyuki Kōzu	1:10
20.	"Mamono o Utsumono III" (魔物を討つ者 Demon Slayer)	Hiroyuki Kōzu	1:04
21.	"Mamono o Utsumono IV" (魔物を討つ者 Demon Slayer)	Hiroyuki Kōzu	1:08
22.	"Mamono o Utsumono V" (魔物を討つ者 Demon Slayer)	Hiroyuki Kōzu	2:00
23.	"Mamono o Utsumono VI" (魔物を討つ者 Demon Slayer)	Hiroyuki Kōzu	0:57
24.	"Mamono o Utsumono VII" (魔物を討つ者 Demon Slayer)	Hiroyuki Kōzu	1:37
25.	"Tōdo Kōgen I" (凍士高原 Tundra Plateau)	Shinji Orito	2:17
26.	"Tōdo Kōgen II" (凍士高原 Tundra Plateau)	Shinji Orito	1:37
27.	"Mitasareta Kioku" (満たされた記憶 Fulfilled Memories)	Hiroyuki Kōzu	1:51
28.	"Makoto to no Wakare plus guitar" (真琴との別れ Farewell with Makoto)	Hiroyuki Kōzu	2:56
29.	"Ayu Tsukimiya plus intro" (月宮あゆ Tsukimiya Ayu)	Hiroyuki Kōzu	2:03
30.	"Shizuka na Kanashimi plus intro" (静かな悲しみ A Quiet Sadness)	Hiroyuki Kōzu	1:54
31.	"Florescence impressive ver." (Lyrics by Naomi Kosaka; Performed by Miho Fujiwara)	Kōji Ueno	2:18
32.	"Flower music box ver."	Masato Kamato	2:18

Disc 2
No.	Title	Music	Length
1.	"Florescence preview short ver." (Lyrics by Naomi Kosaka; Performed by Miho Fujiwara)	Kōji Ueno	0:19
2.	"Shiori Misaka guitar ver." (美坂栞 Misaka Shiori)	Hiroyuki Kōzu	1:50
3.	"Shiori Misaka II" (美坂栞 Misaka Shiori)	Hiroyuki Kōzu	1:44
4.	"Mai Kawasumi II" (川澄舞 Kawasumi Mai)	Hiroyuki Kōzu	1:57
5.	"Hazumu Kimochi comical ver." (弾む気持ち Lively Feelings)	Hiroyuki Kōzu	1:35
6.	"Hazumu Kimochi easy ver." (弾む気持ち Lively Feelings)	Hiroyuki Kōzu	1:42
7.	"Tsuiseki" (追跡 Pursuit)	Hiroyuki Kōzu	1:42
8.	"Kokoro no Odoro" (心の棘 Thorn in the Heart)	Hiroyuki Kōzu	1:43
9.	"Meiro" (迷路 Maze)	Hiroyuki Kōzu	1:36
10.	"Maiochiru Fuan piano ver." (舞い落ちる不安 An Alighting Anxiety)	Hiroyuki Kōzu	1:59
11.	"Iradachi" (苛立ち Irritation)	Hiroyuki Kōzu	1:58
12.	"Munasawagi II" (胸騒ぎ Apprehension)	Hiroyuki Kōzu	1:56
13.	"Tsumetai Manazashi" (冷たい眼差し A Cold Glance)	Hiroyuki Kōzu	1:48
14.	"Mamono o Utsumono VIII" (魔物を討つ者 Demon Slayer)	Hiroyuki Kōzu	4:27
15.	"2 steps toward"	Shinji Orito	2:03
16.	"Yakusoku music box I" (約束 Promise)	Shinji Orito	1:37
17.	"Yakusoku music box II" (約束 Promise)	Shinji Orito	0:24
18.	"Mukai orchestra II" (霧海 Sea of Mist)	OdiakeS	2:14
19.	"Mukai orchestra III" (霧海 Sea of Mist)	OdiakeS	2:26
20.	"Makoto to no Wakare" (真琴との別れ Farewell with Makoto)	Hiroyuki Kōzu	3:12
21.	"Yume no Ato plus strings III" (夢の跡 Remnants of a Dream)	Jun Maeda	3:18
22.	"Yume no Ato dramatic ver." (夢の跡 Remnants of a Dream)	Jun Maeda	3:02
23.	"Flower dramatic ver." (Lyrics by Naomi Kosaka; Performed by Miho Fujiwara)	Masato Kamato	2:37
Total length:			115:19

=== Orgel de Kiku Sakuhin Shū ===
Orgel de Kiku Sakuhin Shū (オルゴールで聴く作品集; lit. Listen to Music Box Work Collection) is an arrange album released for the first Kanon anime series which went on sale on July 25, 2003, in Japan by Movic bearing the catalog number MACM-1167. The album contains one disc with fifteen tracks of arranged versions of background music featured in the first Kanon anime which includes arrangements consisting of music boxes, pianos, harps, flutes, acoustic guitar, and other string instruments. All the tracks were composed by either Kōji Ueno, Hiroyuki Kōzu, or Masato Kamato, and arranged by Minami Nozaki.

All music is composed by Hiroyuki Kōzu, except where noted.

Track listing
No.	Title	Length
1.	"Florescence" (Lyrics by Naomi Kosaka; Composed by Kōji Ueno; Performed by Miho Fujiwara)	3:53
2.	"Kita kara Hakobareru Kaze" (北から運ばれる風 The Wind Carried from the North)	2:43
3.	"Ayu Tsukimiya" (月宮あゆ Tsukimiya Ayu)	2:09
4.	"Kanojo no Iru Fūkei" (彼女のいる風景 The Scenery Where She Exists)	3:36
5.	"Shiori Misaka" (美坂栞 Misaka Shiori)	3:01
6.	"Yasuragi no Shunkan" (安らぎの瞬間 A Moment of Peace)	3:28
7.	"Mai Kawasumi" (川澄舞 Kawasumi Mai)	3:40
8.	"Butōkai" (舞踏会 Dance Party)	3:59
9.	"Makoto Sawatari" (沢渡真琴 Sawatari Makoto)	4:17
10.	"Sepiairo no Kodō" (セピア色の鼓動 Sepia Heartbeats)	3:11
11.	"Mamono o Utsumono VII" (魔物を討つ者 Demon Hunter)	2:38
12.	"Mitasareta Kioku" (満たされた記憶 A Memory Fulfilled)	3:27
13.	"Makoto to no Wakare" (真琴との別れ Farewell with Makoto)	3:05
14.	"Nayuki Minase" (水瀬名雪 Minase Nayuki)	4:22
15.	"Flower" (Lyrics by Naomi Kosaka; Composed by Masato Kamato; Performed by Miho Fujiwara)	3:16
Total length:		50:51

== Singles ==
=== Last regrets / Place of wind which arrives ===
"Last regrets / Place of wind which arrives" (風の辿り着く場所, Kaze no Tadoritsuku Basho) is a single for the Kanon visual novel first released as a limited edition on November 23, 1999, but was also sold at Comiket 57 on December 24, 1999. The single contains seven tracks which includes original and instrumental versions of the game's two theme songs "Last regrets" and "Kaze no Tadoritsuku Basho", and three arrange versions of background music featured in the visual novel. The first half of the last track is the instrumental version of "Kaze no Tadoritsuku Basho", and after a lengthy pause a hidden track of a male vocal version of "Last regrets" plays sung by Kazuya Takase of I've Sound. Other produces of the single include Jun Maeda, Shinji Orito, and Magome Togoshi, with Ayana providing vocals for the original versions of the game's two theme songs.

Track listing
No.	Title	Music	Arrangement	Length
1.	"Last regrets" (Lyrics by Jun Maeda; Performed by Ayana)	Jun Maeda	Kazuya Takase (I've Sound)	6:15
2.	"Kaze no Tadoritsuku Basho" (風の辿り着く場所 Where the Wind Reaches) (Lyrics by Jun Maeda; Performed by Ayana)	Shinji Orito	Kazuya Takase (I've Sound)	6:11
3.	"Asakage (arrange)" (朝影 Morning Lights)	Shinji Orito	Magome Togoshi	5:26
4.	"Fuyu no Hanabi (arrange)" (冬の花火 Winter Fireworks)	Jun Maeda	Shinji Orito	3:41
5.	"Little fragments (arrange)"	Shinji Orito	Magome Togoshi	4:22
6.	"Last regrets (instrumental)"	Jun Maeda	Kazuya Takase (I've Sound)	6:15
7.	"Kaze no Tadoritsuku Basho (instrumental)" (風の辿り着く場所 Where the Wind Reaches)	Shinji Orito	Kazuya Takase (I've Sound)	14:14
Total length:				46:24

=== Florescence / Flower ===
"Florescence / Flower" is single by the J-pop artist Miho Fujiwara first released in Japan on June 7, 2002, by Movic in Japan bearing the catalog number MACM-1157. The single was first released as a limited-edition version containing two more tracks than the regular edition. The first is an instrumental version of "Flower" with background vocals by Miho Fujiwara, and the second is a background music track for Akiko Minase not featured in the first Kanon anime series by Toei Animation. The songs "Florescence" and "Flower" of the single were featured as the opening and ending theme songs of the first Kanon anime respectively.

All songs arranged by Hiroyuki Kōzu.

Track listing
No.	Title	Music	Length
1.	"Florescence" (Lyrics by Naomi Kosaka; Performed by Miho Fujiwara)	Kōji Ueno	5:42
2.	"Flower" (Lyrics by Naomi Kosaka; Performed by Miho Fujiwara)	Masato Kamato	5:05
3.	"Florescence (Off vocal)"	Kōji Ueno	5:42
4.	"Flower (Off vocal)"	Masato Kamato	5:05
5.	"Flower" (Lyrics by Naomi Kosaka; Performed by Miho Fujiwara)	Masato Kamato	5:05
6.	"Akiko-san" (秋子さん)	Hiroyuki Kōzu	0:21
Total length:			26:58

=== Last regrets / Kaze no Tadoritsuku Basho ===
"Last regrets / Kaze no Tadoritsuku Basho" is a single released in commemoration of the Kanon anime by Kyoto Animation. It was first released on December 28, 2006, in Japan by Key Sounds Label bearing the catalog number KSLA-0026. The single contains original, short, and arrange versions of Kanon's two theme songs "Last regrets" and "Kaze no Tadoritsuku Basho" sung by Ayana. The tracks are composed, arranged, and produced by Jun Maeda, Shinji Orito, Kazuya Takase of I've Sound, and Manack.

All lyrics are written by Jun Maeda.

Track listing
No.	Title	Music	Arrangement	Length
1.	"Last regrets (Original Ver.)"	Jun Maeda	Kazuya Takase (I've Sound)	6:16
2.	"Kaze no Tadoritsuku Basho (Original Ver.)" (風の辿り着く場所 Where the Wind Reaches)	Shinji Orito	Kazuya Takase (I've Sound)	6:13
3.	"Last regrets (TV animation ver.)"	Jun Maeda	Kazuya Takase (I've Sound)	1:32
4.	"Kaze no Tadoritsuku Basho (TV animation ver.)" (風の辿り着く場所 Where the Wind Reaches)	Shinji Orito	Kazuya Takase (I've Sound)	1:32
5.	"Last regrets (2006 memorial mix)"	Jun Maeda	Manack	6:32
6.	"Kaze no Tadoritsuku Basho (2006 memorial mix)" (風の辿り着く場所 Where the Wind Reaches)	Shinji Orito	Manack	6:17
Total length:				28:22

== Charts ==
Albums	Release date	Label	Format	Peak Oricon chart positions
TV Animation Edition Kanon Soundtrack Volume 1	May 5, 2002	Movic (MACM-1155)	CD	98
"Florescence/Flower"	June 7, 2002	Movic (MACM-1157)	CD	35
TV Animation Edition Kanon Soundtrack Volume 2	July 5, 2002	Movic (MACM-1156)	CD	53
Orgel de Kiku Sakuhin Shū	July 25, 2003	Movic (MACM-1167)	CD	241
"Last regrets/Kaze no Tadoritsuku Basho"	December 28, 2006	Key Sounds Label (KSLA-0026)	CD	40
