= Svalbarðseyri =

- Village
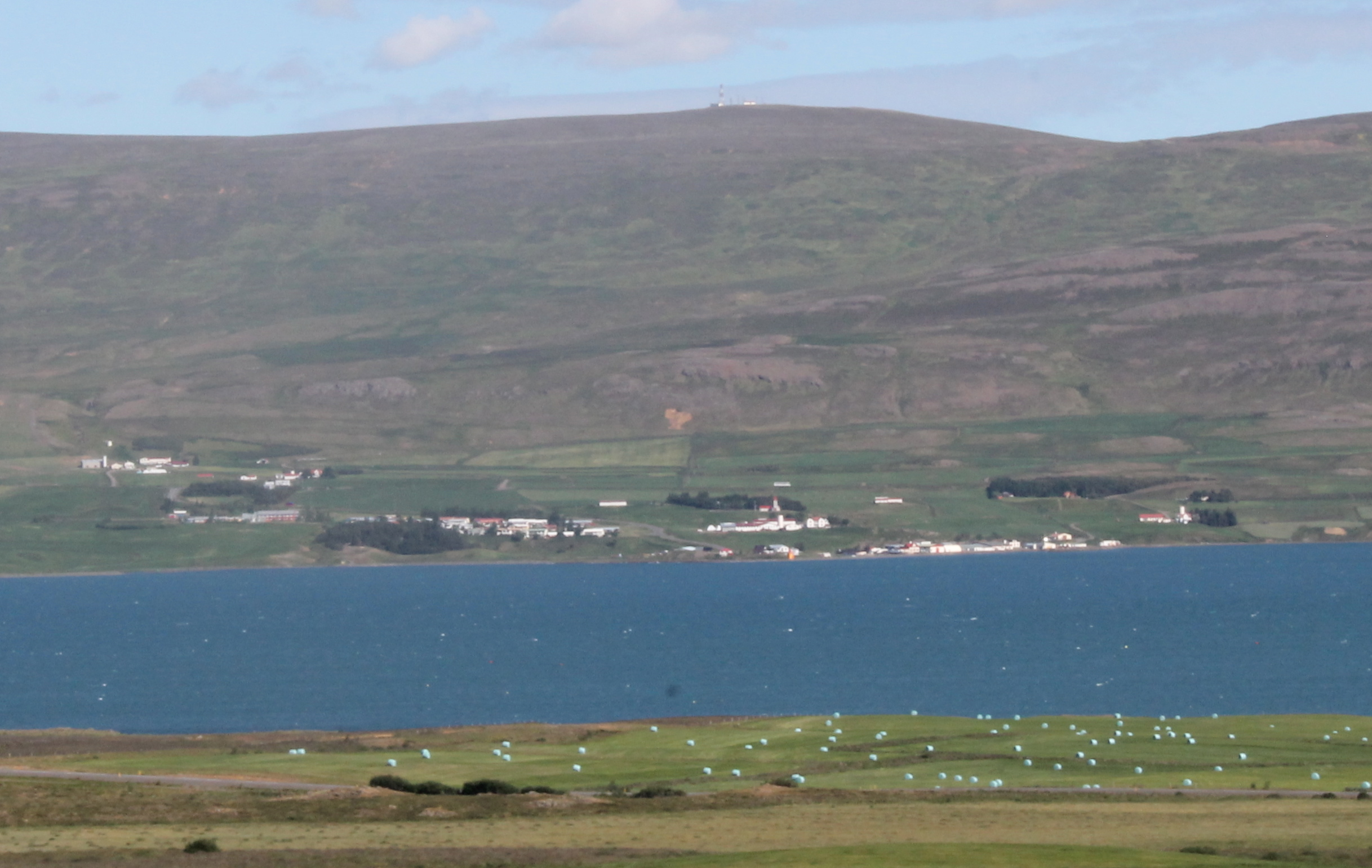

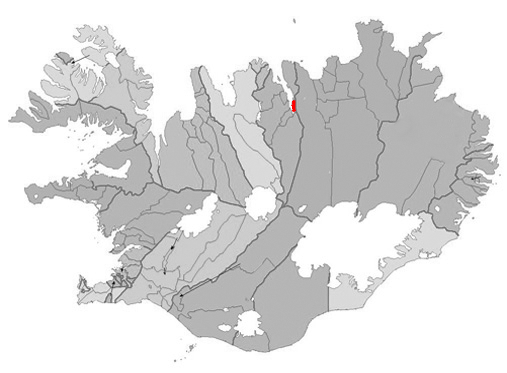
- Location of the Municipality of Svalbarðsstrandarhreppur

- Location of Svalbarðseyri
- Coordinates: 65°45′N 18°6′W
- Country: Iceland
- Constituency: Northeast Constituency
- Region: Northeastern Region
- Municipality: Svalbarðsstrandarhreppur

Population (January 2011)
  - Total: 245

Svalbarðseyri (Icelandic pronunciation: [ˈsvalˌparðsˌeiːrɪ]) is a small village in the Svalbarðsstrandarhreppur municipality, northern Iceland, which in January 2011 had 245 inhabitants.

It is located on the east coast of Eyjafjörður fjord.
