= Makoto Nakamura =

Japanese screenwriter

Makoto Nakamura (中村 誠, Nakamura Makoto, born April 16, 1970) is a Japanese screenwriter and producer of anime from Saitama, Japan.

== Anime staff in ==
- Tenchi Muyo Movie 3: Tenchi Forever (1999 film), Opticals
- Kanon (TV series) (2002 TV series), Storyboard (Ep 7, 8, 11), Series Story Editor
- Mizuiro (2003 OVA), Scenario (Vol.2)
- Air (2005 film), Screenplay
- The Snow Queen (2005 TV series), Script
- Koi suru Tenshi Angelique: Kokoro no Mezameru Toki (2006 TV series), Script (ep 4)
- Clannad (2007 film), Screenplay
- Shugo Chara! (2007 TV series), Script (ep 5, 10, 14, 15, 22, 28, 34, 39, 45, 49)
- Noramimi (2008 TV series), Series Composition
- Telepathy Shōjo Ran (2008 TV series), Series Composition, Screenplay
- Noramimi 2 (2008 TV series), Series Composition

== Other works ==
- Cheburashka (2010 series) as director and screenwriter.
