= Svalbarðsstrandarhreppur =

- Municipality
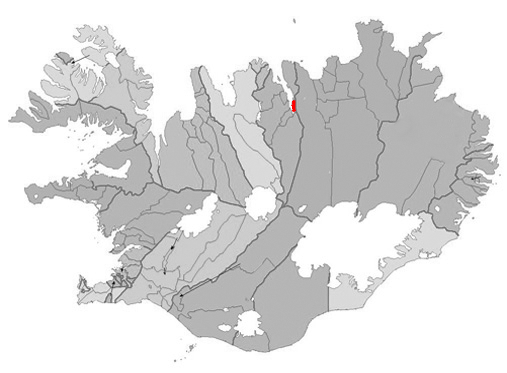
- Location of Svalbarðsstrandarhreppur

- Location within Iceland
- Coordinates: 65.7461132°N 18.0832997°W
- Country: Iceland
- Region: Northeastern Region
- Constituency: Northeast Constituency

Government
  - Manager: Eiríkur H. Hauksson

Area
  - Total: 55 km^{2} (21 sq mi)

Population
  - Total: 387
  - Density: 7.04/km^{2} (18.2/sq mi)
- Municipal number: 6601
- Website: svalbardsstrond.is

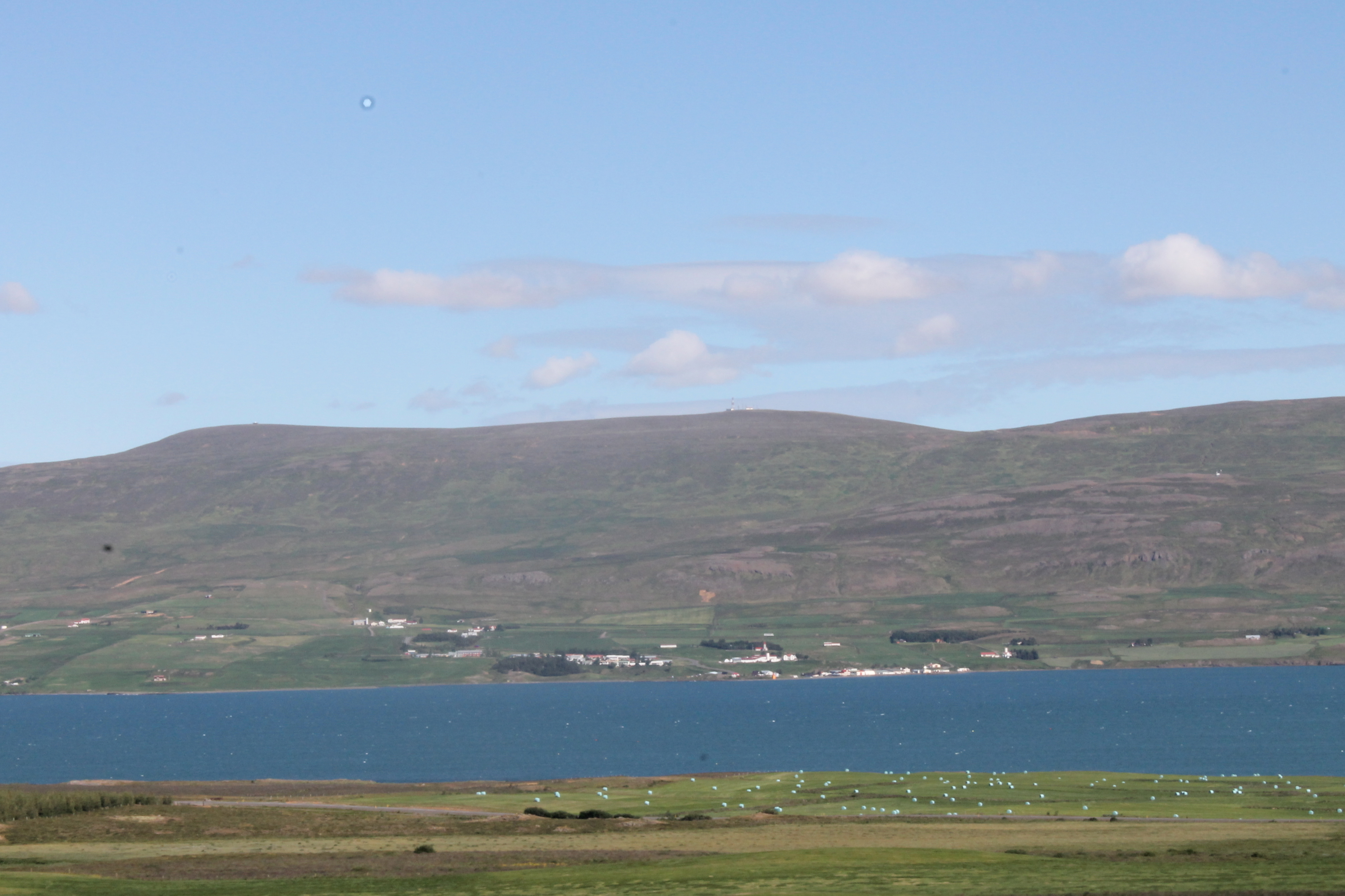
Svalbarðsstrandarhreppur at the Eyjafjörður

Svalbarðsstrandarhreppur (Icelandic pronunciation: [ˈsvalˌparðsˌstrantar̥ˌr̥ɛhpʏr̥]), also named Svalbarðsströnd [-ˌstrœnt], is a municipality located in northern-central Iceland, in Northeastern Region. Its seat is in the village of Svalbarðseyri. In 2020, mayor Björg Erlingsdóttir proposed the idea of a merger with the other municipalities of Eyjafjörður.
