= Ayana (singer) =

Japanese singer-songwriter

- Born: December 29
- Occupation: singer-songwriter

Ayana (彩菜; born December 29) is a Japanese singer-songwriter. She debuted in 1999 as the singer of the opening and ending themes to Key's visual novel Kanon. In 2000, she formed the two-member group Blue Velvet with Shūichi Aoki. She later became a guest vocalist for I've Sound and appeared at the Nippon Budokan on October 15, 2005, at the I've concert "I've in Budokan 2005: Open the Birth Gate", where she sang two songs: a remix version of "Verge" and the normal version of "Last regrets". In 2006, Ayana sang the remix version of Kanon's opening and ending themes on the single "Last regrets / Kaze no Tadoritsuku Basho". On June 20, 2007, she held her first live concert at Roppongi in Tokyo. In October 2007, Ayana reported on her blog that she was married and was pregnant. She gave birth to a son on March 31, 2008.

== Discography ==
=== Solo ===
- "Last regrets" (opening theme of Kanon; June 1999)
- "Kaze no Tadoritsuku Basho" (風の辿り着く場所) (ending theme of Kanon; June 1999)
- I've Girls Compilation vol.1 Regret (December 1999 with I've Sound)
  - "Last regrets"
  - "Kaze no Tadoritsuku Basho"
- I've Girls Compilation vol.2 Verge (July 2000 with I've Sound)
  - "Freak of Nature：Start"
  - "Freak of Nature：End"
  - "Uneasy"
- Platinum Soundtrack (January 2002)
  - "White Distance"
- Aka Original Soundtrack (December 2003)
  - "Sunagin" (砂銀)
- Feel So Good!! Feel Original Re-arrange/Remix Album #001 (December 2003)
  - "Sunagin ~City of the Night Mix~"
- Flower Feel Vocal Showcase:001 (December 2004)
  - "Michishirube" (道標)
- Best of Verve-circle I've Found the Fountains of Paradise (August 2004)
  - "Sky Gray"
- I've Remix Stle Mixed up (December 2004 with I've Sound)
  - "Verge" (Mixed up ver.)
- Angel Type Soundtrack CD Legato (October 2005)
  - "Monologue"
  - "Catharsis"
  - "Loves"
- Live DVD I've in Budokan 2005: Open the Birth Gate (June 2006 with I've Sound)
- Live DVD I've in Budokan 2005: Complete Edit (November 2006 with I've Sound)
- "Last regrets / Kaze no Tadoritsuku Basho" (December 2006)

=== With Blue Velvet ===
- First album Open~ (August 2000)
- Maxi single I Am Calling You (June 2001)
- Second album Rescue (August 2001)
- Second single Setsunai Omoi (切ない想ひ) (December 2002)
- Third album The Acoustic Side (April 2003)
- Fourth album Another World (December 2004)
