= Kanon (video game) =

1999 Japanese adult visual novel

- Cover featuring heroine Ayu Tsukimiya
- Developer: Key
- Publishers: Visual Arts (Windows, Android, BD, iOS); NEC Interchannel (DC, PS2); Prototype (S3G, FOMA, PSP, Switch)
- Director: Naoki Hisaya
- Artist: Itaru Hinoue
- Writers: Naoki Hisaya; Jun Maeda
- Composers: Jun Maeda; Shinji Orito; OdiakeS
- Platforms: Windows, Dreamcast, PlayStation 2, SoftBank 3G, Freedom of Mobile Multimedia Access, PlayStation Portable, Android, Blu-ray Disc, iOS, Nintendo Switch
- Release: June 4, 1999: Windows; JP: June 4, 1999; JP: January 7, 2000; JP: November 26, 2004; JP: January 28, 2005; JP: April 30, 2010; WW: June 20, 2024 Dreamcast; JP: September 14, 2000 PlayStation 2; JP: February 28, 2002 SoftBank 3G; JP: October 27, 2006 FOMA; JP: December 2006 PlayStation Portable; JP: February 15, 2007 Android; JP: November 30, 2011; JP: January 2013 Blu-ray Disc; JP: December 16, 2011 iOS; JP: April 4, 2013 Nintendo Switch; JP: April 20, 2023; WW: February 14, 2025
- Genres: Eroge (Note: Only the original and 2004 Windows releases, and the 2013 Android version have adult content.); visual novel
- Mode: Single-player

Kanon is a Japanese visual novel developed by Key, a brand of Visual Arts. It was released on June 4, 1999, for Windows as an adult game. Key later released versions of Kanon without the erotic content, and the game was ported to the Dreamcast, PlayStation 2, PlayStation Portable and Nintendo Switch. The story follows the life of Yuichi Aizawa, a high school student who returns to a city he last visited seven years prior, and he has little recollection of the events from back then. He meets several girls and slowly regains his lost memories. The gameplay in Kanon follows a branching plot line which offers pre-determined scenarios with courses of interaction, and focuses on the appeal of the five female main characters by the player character. The game once ranked as the second best-selling PC game sold in Japan, and charted in the national top 50 several more times afterwards. Kanon has sold over 300,000 units across several platforms.

Following the game's release, Kanon made several transitions into other media. Two manga series were serialized in Dengeki Daioh and Dragon Age Pure. Comic anthologies, light novels and art books were also published, as were audio dramas and several music albums. Toei Animation produced a 13-episode anime television series in 2002 and an original video animation (OVA) episode in 2003. Kyoto Animation produced a 24-episode anime series in 2006. The 2006 anime was licensed and dubbed in English by ADV Films in 2008, but the license was given to Funimation after ADV's closure. The 2006 anime plays on the association between Kanon and the musical term canon by using Pachelbel's Kanon D-dur, or Canon in D major, as a background piece at certain instances throughout the series.

== Gameplay ==
Text in Kanon is displayed in a dialog box, here depicting the player character talking with Ayu.

Kanon is a romance visual novel in which the player assumes the role of Yuichi Aizawa. Much of its gameplay is spent on reading the story's narrative and dialogue. Kanon follows a branching plot line with multiple endings, and depending on the decisions that the player makes during the game, the plot will progress in a specific direction.

There are five main plot lines that the player will have the chance to experience, one for each of the heroines in the story. Throughout gameplay, the player is given multiple options to choose from, and text progression pauses at these points until a choice is made. To view all plot lines in their entirety, the player will have to replay the game multiple times and choose different choices to further the plot to an alternate direction. After Mai's scenario is completed, a replay of her route will offer an additional choice to play through Sayuri's back-story. Jun Maeda, who worked on the scenario for Kanon, commented in March 2001 that the Japanese public may have fallen under the impression that Key makes soothing games because of Kanon's influence, but Maeda affirmed that there was not one person who worked on Kanon who thought that.

In the adult versions of the game, there are scenes with sexual CGs depicting Yuichi and a given heroine having sex. Later, Key released versions of Kanon without the erotic content. The versions that include the adult content have one explicit sex scene in each of the five main story routes, in addition to one fantasy scene. Outside of these, there are two scenes with nudity. Yūichi Suzumoto, a scenario writer who worked on later Key titles, commented that the sex scenes in Kanon are very self-contained, and can be easily removed without altering the story. Maeda remarked that the sex scenes were not written with reproduction in mind.

== Plot ==
The events of Kanon occur in winter. Since it often snows over the course of the entire story, the city is always presented covered in a layer of snow. The shopping district is featured throughout the story when the characters visit the town, especially whenever Ayu appears in the early story. The high school where Yuichi and the other main characters attend, including the school grounds, is often shown in Shiori and Mai's stories each. Otherwise, it is the main location where Yuichi interacts with other characters.

One of the motifs in the story is Yuichi, Ayu and Makoto suffering from amnesia in various degrees, which is used as a plot device to advance the story. Another motif deals with the favorite foods of the five main heroines. Newtype USA stated in an article on Kanon that "it's when the characters are eating something really tasty that they seem most beautiful and alive" despite the somber setting and overall tone of the series. These five foods of choice are: taiyaki (Ayu), strawberries (Nayuki), nikuman (Makoto), ice cream (Shiori), and gyudon (Mai).

Kanon heroines (clockwise from top-left): Mai, Nayuki, Shiori, Ayu and Makoto

=== Story ===
On January 6, 1999, second year high school student Yuichi Aizawa arrives in the city and is detached from its inhabitants. Prior to his return, it is decided that he is to stay with his first cousin, Nayuki Minase, and her mother, Akiko. After his long absence, Yuichi has forgotten almost everything except minor details of what happened seven years before and is in need of being reminded of what he left behind. Nayuki initially tried repeatedly to jog his memory, but is unsuccessful. Throughout the story, as he learns about the supernatural undertones of the city, Yuichi is reminded of the events of seven years ago.

== Characters ==
Yuichi Aizawa (相沢 祐一, Aizawa Yūichi)
Voiced by: Atsushi Kisaichi (2002 anime), Tomokazu Sugita (2006 anime/PSP game), Miwa Yasuda (Young Yuichi) (Japanese); Chris Patton, Shannon Emerick (Young) (English)
Yuichi Aizawa is a cynical 17-year-old protagonist in high school. He is known to play jokes on girls his age and interacts with them throughout the story. Despite this, Yuichi is loyal to impress others and does not ask much from others in return for what he does for them.
Ayu Tsukimiya (月宮 あゆ, Tsukimiya Ayu)
Voiced by: Yui Horie (Japanese); Brittney Karbowski (English)
Ayu is the main heroine in Kanon, followed closely by Nayuki Minase who is the only Kanon heroine to appear with Ayu on three of the official video game covers released by Key. Ayu was created by Naoki Hisaya who wrote her scenario for the visual novel, and designed by Itaru Hinoue.
Nayuki Minase (水瀬 名雪, Minase Nayuki)
Voiced by: Mariko Kōda (Japanese); Jessica Boone (English)
Nayuki is Yuichi's cousin, with whom he moves in with at the beginning of the story. She has always been in love with him despite being cousins and must learn how to deal with these feelings, especially with the threat that he may fall for one of the other girls.
Makoto Sawatari (沢渡 真琴, Sawatari Makoto)
Voiced by: Mayumi Iizuka (Japanese); Tiffany Terrell (English)
Makoto is a young girl who suddenly attacked Yuichi Aizawa in the middle of town early on in the story, albeit in a weak manner that he could defeat her by simply extending his arm out. She is carried back to the Minase household where she lives as a guest for the remainder of her story. Despite having lost her memories, she remembers her name and is sure that she holds a grudge against Yuichi from when he visited the city in the past.
Shiori Misaka (美坂 栞, Misaka Shiori)
Voiced by: Hiroko Konishi (Dreamcast and PlayStation 2 games), Akemi Satō (anime/PSP game), Maggie Flecknoe (English)
Shiori is a first year high school student who has suffered from an illness since birth. Her affliction has caused her to be very physically weak, and she is almost always absent from school because of it. She loves drama and is always inventing reasons for things that happen in her life.
Mai Kawasumi (川澄 舞, Kawasumi Mai)
Voiced by: Yukari Tamura (Japanese); Melissa Davis (English)
Mai is a third-year student of the same high school that Yuichi goes to.
Akiko Minase (水瀬 秋子, Minase Akiko)
Voiced by: Yūko Minaguchi (Japanese); Joanne Bonasso (English)
Akiko is Nayuki Minase's mother and Yuichi Aizawa's aunt who works at an unspecified job and takes care of the house, cooking various types of food. She seems to not realize exactly what is going on around her, taking in strays such as Makoto Sawatari and assuming lame excuses for her behavior.
Kaori Misaka (美坂 香里, Misaka Kaori)
Voiced by: Ayako Kawasumi (Japanese); Caitlin Glass (English)
Kaori is Yuichi's and Nayuki's classmate as well as the class representative. She is intelligent and knows a lot about the schoolmates and townspeople, but seems to be unaware of any of the supernatural things that happen, even after Yuichi's caring saves someone close to her.
Sayuri Kurata (倉田 佐祐理, Kurata Sayuri)
Voiced by: Tomoko Kawakami (Japanese); Natalie Arneson (English)
Sayuri was Mai Kawasumi's only friend before she met Yuichi, thus became her biggest part is in Mai's story. She is the daughter of a wealthy family, and always tries to smile and help others. Sayuri uses more formal Japanese honorifics for Yuichi when she addresses him, even when they become close friends.
Mishio Amano (天野 美汐, Amano Mishio)
Voiced by: Maaya Sakamoto (Japanese); Colleen Clinkenbeard (English)
Mishio is a key player near the end of Makoto Sawatari's story; she does not appear so much in this story as the other characters in this section. She mysteriously warns Yuichi to stay away from Makoto when Makoto's health begins to fail.

== Development ==
Most of Kanon's development staff originally worked for the visual novel publisher Nexton under the brand Tactics. After the release of the brand's third game One: Kagayaku Kisetsu e, most of Tactics' staff left Nexton to pursue work in another publishing company where they could have the freedom to produce their next game. Itaru Hinoue, who had previously worked at Visual Arts once before, introduced Key's founding members to the president of Visual Arts, Takahiro Baba. Baba gave the developers the freedom they desired, and they officially transferred to Visual Arts where they formed Key on July 21, 1998, and started production on Kanon. The planning for the visual novel was headed by Naoki Hisaya who was also one of two scenario writers with Jun Maeda. Hisaya wrote the scenarios for Ayu, Nayuki and Shiori, while Maeda wrote the routes for Makoto and Mai. Art direction was headed by Key's artist Itaru Hinoue who worked on the character design and computer graphics. Further computer graphics were split between three people—Dinn, Miracle Mikipon, Shinory—and background art was provided by Torino. The music in the game was composed by OdiakeS, Shinji Orito and Jun Maeda. Kanon was the first and last visual novel developed by Key that two of the main staff—Naoki Hisaya, and OdiakeS—worked on before pursuing a similar line of work in other visual novel studios.

=== Release history ===
Kanon was released as an adult game on June 4, 1999, in limited and regular editions, playable on a Windows PC as a CD-ROM. The limited edition came bundled with the remix album Anemoscope remixing background music tracks featured in the visual novel. Key released an all ages version on January 7, 2000, for Windows. An updated adult version called the Kanon Standard Edition was released on November 26, 2004, with added support for Windows 2000/XP as a DVD-ROM. The Standard Edition incorporates the extra graphics added to the earlier all ages version of the game, and other technical changes such as more save slots. An all ages version of the Standard Edition was released on January 28, 2005. An updated all ages version of Kanon compatible for Windows Vista PCs was released by Key on July 31, 2009, in a box set containing five other Key visual novels called Key 10th Memorial Box. Another all ages updated version compatible for Windows 7 PCs called Kanon Memorial Edition was released on April 30, 2010.

The first consumer console port of the game was released for the Dreamcast on September 14, 2000, by NEC Interchannel. A PlayStation 2 (PS2) version was released on February 28, 2002, also by NEC Interechannel. The PS2 version was re-released as a "Best" version on December 22, 2004. The PS2 version was bundled in a "Key 3-Part Work Premium Box" package together with the PS2 versions of Air and Clannad released on July 30, 2009. An adult version playable as a Blu-ray Disc was released on December 16, 2011, by Asoberu! BD-Game, a brand of Visual Arts.

Prototype through VisualArt's Motto released a version playable on SoftBank 3G mobile phones on October 27, 2006, and another version playable on FOMA mobile phones in December 2006. A PlayStation Portable (PSP) version of the game was released in Japan on February 15, 2007, by Prototype. The first release of the PSP version came with a special DVD featuring a message from five of the voice actors and a recompiled opening video from the video game version. The five voice actors on the DVD included: Mariko Kōda as Nayuki Minase, Akemi Satō as Shiori Misaka, Mayumi Iizuka as Makoto Sawatari, Yūko Minaguchi as Akiko Minase, and Tomokazu Sugita as Yuichi Aizawa. Yui Horie as Ayu Tsukimiya voiced the short introduction of the DVD, but was not featured in the contents of the DVD itself. A downloadable version of the PSP release via the PlayStation Store was released by Prototype on November 9, 2009. A version playable on Android devices was released on November 30, 2011. An adult version for Android devices was released in January 2013. A version playable on iOS devices was released on April 4, 2013. In the original release, there was no voice acting for the characters, but in the later versions produced for the Dreamcast and PS2, full voice acting was included. The only exception was Yuichi, who was not voiced in either version. However, the PSP release features voice acting for Yuichi, provided by Tomokazu Sugita. Prototype released a Nintendo Switch version in Japan on April 20, 2023.

Visual Arts and Prototype announced a Windows release for Kanon distributed via Steam with English, Japanese and Simplified Chinese language support, which released on June 20, 2024. It was released on Nintendo Switch on February 14, 2025.

== Adaptations ==
- Kanon
- Genre: Drama, supernatural
- Light novel
- Written by: Mariko Shimizu
- Illustrated by: Itaru Hinoue
- Published by: Paradigm
- Original run: October 23, 1999 – August 1, 2000
- Volumes: 5
- Manga
- Written by: Key
- Illustrated by: Petit Morishima
- Published by: MediaWorks
- Magazine: Dengeki Daioh
- Original run: February 2000 – July 2002
- Volumes: 2
- Anime television series
- Directed by: Naoyuki Itō
- Produced by: Mamoru Yokota
- Written by: Makoto Nakamura; Ryōta Yamaguchi
- Music by: Hiroyuki Kouzu
- Studio: Toei Animation
- Original network: Fuji TV, Kansai TV
- Original run: January 31, 2002 – March 28, 2002
- Episodes: 13 + OVA
- Manga

Kanon: Honto no Omoi wa Egao no Mukōgawa ni
- Written by: Key
- Illustrated by: Kinusa Shimotsuki
- Published by: Fujimi Shobo
- Magazine: Dragon Age Pure
- Original run: June 29, 2006 – October 20, 2007
- Volumes: 2
- Anime television series
- Directed by: Tatsuya Ishihara
- Written by: Fumihiko Shimo
- Music by: Jun Maeda; Shinji Orito; OdiakeS
- Studio: Kyoto Animation
- Licensed by: Crunchyroll (Note: In North America through Crunchyroll, LLC (formerly known as Funimation), and in Australia through Crunchyroll Pty. Ltd. (formerly known as Madman Anime). Until 2008, it was licensed by ADV Films, now known as Sentai Filmworks and Section23 Films.); UK: MVM Entertainment
- Original network: BS-i, TBS
- English network: NA: Anime Network; ZA: SABC 3
- Original run: October 5, 2006 – March 15, 2007
- Episodes: 24

=== Light novels ===
Five adult light novels written by Mariko Shimizu and published by Paradigm were released in Japan between October 1999 and August 2000. The cover art and internal illustrations were drawn by Itaru Hinoue, the artist who drew the artwork in the visual novel. The basis for each novel was one of each of the five heroines and had titles that were taken from the musical themes pertaining to each character in the original game. The first two released were Yuki no Shōjo (雪の少女, Girl in the Snow; Nayuki) and Egao no Mukougawa ni (笑顔の向こう側に, Beyond the Smile; Shiori) in December 1999. The third was Shōjo no Ori (少女の檻, Girl's Prison; Mai) released in April 2000 and the fourth novel was titled The Fox and the Grapes (Makoto), released two months later. The final novel titled Hidamari no Machi (日溜りの街, A Sunny City; Ayu) was released in August 2000. Paradigm re-released the five novels in conjunction with Visual Arts under their VA Bunko imprint, which removed the erotic scenes, starting with Yuki no Shōjo on June 27, 2009, and ending with Hidamari no Machi on December 26, 2009. To make up for the missing erotic content, Shimizu wrote additional content for each volume. A sixth novel titled Kanojotachi no Kenkai (彼女たちの見解, The Girls' Opinions) for the supporting character Sayuri Kurata written by Shimizu and illustrated by Zen was released on March 31, 2011.

=== Trading card game ===
Following the release of the original visual novel, Key collaborated with TI Tokyo to release the Kanon Trading Card Game. The game was showcased through Comiket, with the original beta cards and promotional materials appearing in winter 1999. This release would also be expanded to include the Air Trading Card Game, based on Key's followup visual novel, Air, alongside several expansions to the core game.

=== Drama CDs and radio shows ===
A set of five drama CDs were released between September 29, 2000, and April 27, 2001, with each volume focusing on a different heroine. A set of five anthology drama CDs were released between December 22, 2001, and May 25, 2002, with each volume again focusing on a different heroine. A radio show to promote the Dreamcast port of Kanon titled Kanon: The Snow Talk Memories Yuki Furu Machi no Monogatari (Kanon -The snow talks memories- 雪降る街の物語) broadcast 13 episodes between October 6 and December 29, 2000. The show, produced by Movic, was hosted by Yukari Tamura and Tomoko Kawakami, the voices Mai Kawasumi and Sayuri Kurata, respectively. A radio drama titled Minase-sanchi (水瀬さんち) broadcast 53 episodes between October 6, 2001, and October 5, 2002. The show, which was broadcast on TBS Radio and Radio Kansai, was hosted by Yūko Minaguchi, the voice of Akiko Minase, and narrated by Atsushi Kisaichi. The voice actors from Kanon were also featured as guests. Five CD compilation volumes containing all of the show's broadcasts were released between August 30, 2002, and April 26, 2003.

=== Manga ===
The first Kanon manga illustrated by Petit Morishima was serialized in MediaWorks' manga magazine Dengeki Daioh between the February 2000 and July 2002 issues. The individual chapters were later collected into two separate tankōbon volumes published by MediaWorks under their Dengeki Comics imprint released in September 2000 and on July 27, 2002. There are six chapters in total, three in each volume. Aside from the prologue in volume one and the epilogue in volume two, the other four chapters concern four of the main heroines. From chapters one through four, the main heroines presented are: Shiori Misaka, Makoto Sawatari, Mai Kawasumi and Ayu Tsukimiya. To make up for Nayuki not getting a chapter of her own, the story is altered in that Nayuki is in most of the scenes Yuichi is in. The first manga is different from the visual novel in that Shiori's, Makoto's, and Mai's stories are not told in their entirety. Near the end of each of these girls' stories were originally intended to give the viewer the remaining answers, but the manga version ends these girls' stories prematurely. This was due to the manga putting more focus on Ayu's story.

The second manga illustrated by Kinusa Shimotsuki, under the main title Kanon: Honto no Omoi wa Egao no Mukōgawa ni (Kanon ホントの想いは笑顔の向こう側に, Kanon: The Real Feelings of the Other Side of the Smiling Face) with the subtitle each regret of Kanon, was serialized between volumes two and seven of Fujimi Shobo's Dragon Age Pure magazine sold between June 29, 2006, and October 20, 2007, respectively. The first volume was released in Japan on April 1, 2007, and focused on Nayuki's story. The second volume was released on December 8, 2007, and focused on the other four heroines. There are nine chapters in total, five in volume one and four in volume two.

There have also been many releases of manga anthologies produced by different companies and drawn by a multitude of different artists. The first volume of the earliest anthology series, released by Ichijinsha under the title Kanon Comic Anthology, was released in November 2000 under their DNA Media Comics label. Volumes for this series continued to be released for another two years, ending in December 2002 with the 14th volume; an additional 15th volume was released later in February 2007. Ichijinsha also released two more volumes of anthology collections of four-panel comic strips titled Kanon 4-koma Kings in April and June 2001. Softgarage released an anthology in a single volume in December 2002 titled Kanon Anthology Comic. In April 2004, Ohzora released an anthology composed of works based on both Kanon and Air titled Haru Urara: Kanon & Air.

Between June and August 2004, Ohzora also released five separate volumes of manga based on Kanon drawn by five separate artists. Ohzora later collected some of the previously published manga anthologies into two volumes titled Kanon Anthology Comics Best Selection released in December 2006 and January 2007. Additionally, Ohzora released another 13 volumes of an anthology series titled Kanon under their Twin Heart Comics label. The now-bankrupt publisher Raporto also released 21 manga anthology volumes titled Kanon under their Raporto Comics label between November 2000 and October 2002. The last manga anthology, a collection of four-panel comic strips released in a single volume by Enterbrain titled Magi-Cu 4-koma Kanon, was released in January 2007 under their MC Comics label. Each of the anthology series are written and drawn by an average of 20 people per volume.

=== Anime ===
A comparison depicting the introductory scene of Nayuki Minase from the Toei (left) and Kyoto (right) anime versions of Kanon. The first anime aired in a 4:3 aspect ratio, and the second anime aired in a 16:9 ratio.

The first Kanon anime was produced by the Japanese animation studio Toei Animation and directed by Naoyuki Itō. Thirteen episodes were produced and aired in Japan on Fuji TV between January 31 and March 28, 2002. The series also later aired on Kansai TV. Later, a single original video animation (OVA) episode titled "Kanon Kazahana" was released in March 2003. The anime series and OVA used the songs "Florescence" and "Flower" for the opening and ending themes, respectively. While it does not appear as the ending theme in the first 12 episodes or in the OVA, the game's ending theme "Where the Wind Reaches" is used as the ending theme for the series in episode 13. Additionally, the game's opening theme "Last regrets" is played near the end of episode 13 during the flashback scene.

Starting in 2006, Kyoto Animation, the animators of another Key game-turned-anime, Air, decided to animate a new adaptation of Kanon. This version, directed by Tatsuya Ishihara and written by Fumihiko Shimo, aired between October 5, 2006, and March 15, 2007, on BS-i, containing 24 episodes. The series was later rebroadcast on TBS. ADV Films announced on September 21, 2007, at the Anime Weekend Atlanta anime convention that they have officially licensed the second Kanon anime series. ADV had previously posted a trailer for the series in August 2007, but was soon taken offline once the news had been spread on the Internet. The first English-dubbed episode was made available via streaming online at Anime News Network between December 23 and December 30, 2007. In July 2008, the licensing rights of the second Kanon anime were transferred from ADV to Funimation Entertainment (now known as Crunchyroll as of 2026) who continued to produce the series in North America. MVM Entertainment released Kanon on DVD in the United Kingdom on April 14, 2022.

The second TV Kanon animation features updated animation quality, and uses the same voice acting cast as the first anime, with the exception of Yuichi and Kuze. Unlike the first anime, the actual theme songs from the Kanon game are used for the second anime's opening theme, ending theme and soundtrack. There is one song featured as an insert song in episode 16 that did not come from the visual novel titled "Last regrets (X'mas floor style)" by Eiko Shimamiya from I've Sound's first album Regret. Other songs are used from the arrange albums released over the years, which include Anemoscope, Recollections, Re-feel, and Ma-Na.

== Music ==
The visual novel has two main theme songs, the opening theme "Last regrets", and the ending theme "Kaze no Tadoritsuku Basho" (風の辿り着く場所, Where the Wind Reaches), both sung by Ayana. The lyrics for both songs were written by Jun Maeda, and arranged by Kazuya Takase of I've Sound. The five heroines have leitmotifs. Ayu's theme is "Hidamari no Machi" (日溜りの街, A Sunny City); Nayuki's theme is "Yuki no Shōjo" (雪の少女, Girl in the Snow); Makoto's theme is "The Fox and the Grapes"; Shiori's theme is "Egao no Mukōgawa ni" (笑顔の向こう側に, Beyond the Smile); lastly, Mai's theme is "Shōjo no Ori" (少女の檻, Girls' Prison).

The first music album released was Anemoscope which came bundled with the original release of Kanon in June 1999. The next release was a single, "Last regrets/Place of wind which arrives", which contained the opening and ending themes plus arranged versions of three background music tracks and a male vocal version of the opening theme. A compilation album containing tracks from the two albums was released in December 2001 called Recollections. The game's original soundtrack was released in October 2002 containing 22 different tracks along with short versions of the two theme songs. A piano arrange album was released in December 2003 called Re-feel which contained five tracks from Kanon and five from Air. Excluding the first two albums, each of the albums released for the visual novel version were released on Key's record label Key Sounds Label; this is due to the first two albums being released before the label was formed.

The first anime's first original soundtrack was released in May 2002, and a second followed in July 2002. The first anime's opening theme is "Florescence" and the ending theme is "Flower", both sung by Miho Fujiwara; the maxi single containing the anime's opening and ending themes was released in June 2002. An album containing music box arranged tracks of music from the first anime was released in July 2003 called Orgel de Kiku Sakuhin Shū. The albums released for the first anime were produced by Frontier Works and Movic. A single was released in commemoration for the second anime called "Last regrets/Kaze no Tadoritsuku Basho" which contained the game's original opening and ending themes in original, short, and remixed versions; the album was produced by Key Sounds Label.

== Reception and legacy ==
According to a national ranking of how well bishōjo games sold nationally in Japan, the original Kanon release for Windows achieved its highest rank at number two in the ranking. Three years later in June 2002, the original release ranked in again at 45, and then again at 46 the following two weeks. The original release also made the ranking after that at number 41 in early July 2002. The Kanon Standard Edition premiered at number 16 in the rankings. The Kanon Standard Edition remained on the top 50 list for the next two months, achieving the rankings of 47 and 35. The all ages version of the Kanon Standard Edition premiered at number 42 on the national ranking, went up to 35 the next month, and did not appear on the rankings after that. The Dreamcast port sold 42,379 units in the first week and was the fourth top selling console game in Japan for that week. Kanon has sold over 300,000 units across several platforms, not counting the PSP release.

Five days before the first PS2 release for Kanon, a PS2 printer called Tapis MPR-505 went on sale which enabled the user to print out game screens. Kanon was one of the three games supported at launch, the other two being America Ōden Ultra Quiz from DigiCube and Marle de Jigsaw from Nippon Ichi Software. The first PS2 release in 2002 was reviewed by the Japanese video game magazine Famitsu where the game received an overall score of 29/40 (out of the four individual review scores of 7, 8, 7, and 7). Yūichi Suzumoto commented in an interview in March 2001 that he felt the end of Kanon's story could be summed up as "the prince and princess live happily ever after. The end," resulting in an ending that does not expand on what could possibly happen afterwards. In the October 2007 issue of Dengeki G's Magazine, poll results for the 50 best bishōjo games were released. Out of 249 titles, Kanon ranked fifth with 71 votes.

Characters from Kanon have appeared in several dōjin games not directly based on the Kanon series such as the Eternal Fighter Zero game by Twilight Frontier where most of the playable characters either came from Kanon or from One: Kagayaku Kisetsu e. The dōjin game Glove on Fight featured at least two Kanon characters: Ayu Tsukimiya and Akiko Minase in a fighting style game along with various other characters taken from other media. The character Ayu Tsukimiya in particular is known to appear in works outside Kanon, such as in strip 67 of the webcomic Megatokyo where Ayu is shown eating taiyaki.

The second Kanon anime series was reviewed at Anime News Network where Theron Martin commented how the series is a "formulaic moe haremfest", and how the moe aspects of the series may make viewers "feel like they're drowning in a vat of gooey cuteness". The series is described as being similar to the anime television adaptation of Air, saying "Like Air, the first four episodes can be simply summarized as 'male lead arrives in town and kills time interacting with cute girls.' Unlike Air, however, these interactions can occasionally be very funny." Martin also compares Kanon to the anime adaptation of Shuffle! which is described as "bombing" where Kanon "works". The reviewer chalks this up to the characters "endear[ing] themselves to the viewer...far better than what Shuffle!'s do." Martin cites the transition between humor and serious content as a defining feature of the series. However, Martin comments how one of the series' flaws is how it "overplays the mundane cutesiness and moe cards at times" causing little to happen with the plot. Yuichi is described as being "too erratic to be fully credible" or easily believable. Despite the series' drawbacks, Martin still describes the series as "one of the best moe-centric series to date" and lauds Kyoto Animation's production values making Kanon "one of the prettiest-looking anime series of the past year". Martin adds another series comparison, citing Kanon as the "polar opposite of Gurren Lagann", which deals primarily in its action-oriented content.
