= OdiakeS =

- Born: March 22
- Origin: Tokyo, Japan
- Genres: J-pop, Techno
- Occupation: Composer
- Instruments: Keyboard, Synthesizer
- Years active: 1998–present

OdiakeS (born March 22) is a Japanese composer from Tokyo, Japan who has worked for a variety of visual novel companies. His first work was on the game One: Kagayaku Kisetsu e under Tactics. When the staff of One left Tactics to create the company Key, OdiakeS became a member of Key and had a hand in the musical composition of Key's first title Kanon. After Kanon was complete, OdiakeS left Key and became a freelance artist; over time he has been employed by several different visual novel companies. OdiakeS has also been active with his dōjin music circle SJV-SC.

== Career ==
OdiakeS began his musical career for visual novels with One: Kagayaku Kisetsu e by the company Tactics under Nexton released in 1998. After the completion of One, OdiakeS, and much of the staff who made One, including Jun Maeda, Itaru Hinoue, Shinji Orito, and Naoki Hisaya, left Tactics to work under the video game publishing company VisualArt's where they formed the company Key. After forming Key, OdiakeS worked on the music for their first title Kanon released in 1999, which proved to be very popular in the adult game market in Japan. Despite being one of the founding members of Key, OdiakeS left Key after Kanon's release and became a freelance music artist. OdiakeS returned for Key for a short time in 2000 to help with Air's arrange album Ornithopter, along with in 2004 for Clannad's remix album -Memento-.

Since he was not affiliated with a single company or publishing firm, OdiakeS continued to provide music for visual novels for many different companies. The year 2000 proved to be a busy year for OdiakeS when he contributed to the music in no less than six visual novels for four separate companies. Three of these titles were by Janis—London Star: Koi no Double Click, Watashi no Arika., and Triangle Heart 3: Sweet Songs Forever—while the remaining three were Omakase Dōkōkai by Rain Software, Remel by Usagi Kurabu, and Prism Heart by Pajamas Soft. OdiakeS continued to work with Pajamas Soft between 2001 and 2002 with three more titles for the company: Prism Box, Pandora no Yume, and Pandora no Bikkuri Hako. Also in 2002, OdiakeS provided music for Windmill's Yuihashi, along with Pajamas Soft's Panic!! Kero Kero Kingdom. In 2003, he worked to produce music for Puchi Pajama's Punitsuma: Okusan wa Anata Iro, and back to Pajamas Soft for their title Pizzicato Polka: Suisei Maboroshi Yoru. The following year in 2004, OdiakeS provided his services for TinkerBell's Hana Maru!, Pajamas Soft's Oku-sama wa Miko? R: Pretty Fiancée, F&C's White Breath: With Faint Hope, and Puchi Pajama's Pure Maid: Kise Kaeshite ne. OdiakeS worked on two games in 2005, Xuse's Chikan Mono Thomas II, and Windmill's Happiness!. In 2006, he helped with music for Prism Heart's sequel Prism Ark again for Pajamas Soft, along with providing music for Whirlpool's Ina ☆ Koi! Oinari-sama to Motemote no Tatari, and Limit Max's Hime Nin: Sakura. In 2007, OdiakeS provided music for Siesta's Arpeggio: Kimi Iro no Melody, and Pajamas Soft's Prism Ark: Love Love Maximum. In 2008, OdiakeS arranged two songs on Twinkle Crusaders' arrange album Kira-Kira Sound Festival for Pajamas Soft's sister brand, Lillian. Also in 2008, OdiakeS provided music for Whirlpool's MagusTale Infinity. He composed all of the background music in Hooksoft's 2011 game Strawberry Nauts.
