= No Guns Life =

Japanese manga series

- First tankōbon volume cover, featuring Juzo Inui

ノー・ガンズ・ライフ (Nō Ganzu Raifu)
- Genre: Cyberpunk
- Manga
- Written by: Tasuku Karasuma
- Published by: Shueisha
- English publisher: NA: Viz Media
- Magazine: Ultra Jump
- Original run: September 19, 2014 – September 18, 2021
- Volumes: 13
- Anime television series
- Directed by: Naoyuki Itō
- Written by: Yukie Sugawara
- Music by: Kenji Kawai
- Studio: Madhouse
- Licensed by: Crunchyroll: SEA: Muse Communication
- Original network: TBS, AT-X, SUN, KBS, BS11
- English network: US: Crunchyroll Channel
- Original run: October 10, 2019 – September 24, 2020
- Episodes: 24
- icon

No Guns Life (Japanese: ノー・ガンズ・ライフ, Hepburn: Nō Ganzu Raifu) is a Japanese manga series written and illustrated by Tasuku Karasuma. It was serialized in Shueisha's seinen manga magazine Ultra Jump from September 2014 to September 2021, with its chapters collected in thirteen tankōbon volumes.

An anime television series adaptation has been produced by Madhouse. The first season aired from October to December 2019, while the second season aired from July to September 2020.

In North America, the manga has been licensed for English language release by Viz Media. The anime television series is licensed by Crunchyroll.

== Plot ==
In the near future, many humans have become cyborgs called "Extended" (エックステンド, Ekkusutendo). However, with a great war having recently ended, many Extended, who are former soldiers, begin resorting to crime in order to survive. Juzo Inui is a "Resolver," an Extended mercenary who specializes in solving problems caused by other Extended. However, Juzo's life is turned upside down when a renegade Extended breaks into his office, pleading for him to protect a young boy named Tetsurō Arahabaki.

== Characters ==
Juzo Inui (乾十三, Inui Juzo)
Voiced by: Junichi Suwabe (Japanese); Chris Ryan (English)
An amnesiac private detective who works as a "Resolver," taking on cases relating to Extended and priding himself on always seeing a case to completion. His distinguishing feature is that his head is a giant functioning handgun, specifically a revolver, the trademark trait of the Gun Slave Unit model of Over-Extended used in the war. However, he is unable to fire it himself and requires someone else to do so, only granting the privilege to people he trusts out of a desire to not become a "tool." His head gun is immensely powerful, firing a large beam that can easily destroy even the strongest Extended. His personal motto is "wipe your own ass," a belief that one should deal with their own problems without relying on others. He expresses distaste for children and humidity, out of fear his head will rust, and has no memory of his life before becoming an Extended. Juzo is a habitual chain smoker, preferring the Tanegashima brand for their taste. His cigarettes are actually a specially-formulated medication for Extended which dulls the pain from nerve damage stemming from Extensions. Juzo was once known as "Device #13," the last of 13 Gun Slave Units produced during the war and one of only four confirmed to still be alive in the present day. His former Hands partner, an unnamed man with Japanese ancestry, is the one who gave him the name Juzo (十三), which literally means "thirteen" in Japanese. His body is equipped with a number of powerful hidden features and weapons that can normally only be activated with the authorization of someone with a Hands Extension, though Juzo is able to forcefully activate some of these features on his own with some effort. However, doing so is dangerous, as it puts great strain on his body and mind as he fights against his limiter programming and he is generally unwilling to do so anyway unless given no other option. His onboard combat program automatically activates a restricted battle mode whenever he is in significant danger, unlocking some of his body's features and increasing his combat potential at the cost of suppressing his consciousness and sending him into a berserker state where he attacks anything his program deems a threat. His primary weapon is a revolver-like device embedded in his right hand that allows him to fire a powerful concussive punch known as Funke Faust (ファンケ・ファウスト, Fanke Fausuto) (German for "Spark Fist").
Tetsurō Arahabaki (荒吐鉄朗, Arahabaki Tetsurō)
Voiced by: Daiki Yamashita (Japanese); Caleb Yen (English)
The teenage son of Berühren Corp CEO Soichiro Arahabaki. He has been experimented on and possesses a device known as "Harmony" implanted in his throat, which allows him to control Extended bodies from a distance as if they were his own and unlock an Extension's full potential. The tendons in his arms and legs as well as his vocal cords have been severed, making him incapable of moving or speaking on his own. Mary later provides him with wearable Extensions that allow him to walk and use his arms again and he uses Harmony with a discarded Extended head to speak. Because of the torture he received at Berühren Corp, he has lost significant portions of his memory, particularly the fact that he once allied himself with the anti-Extended organization Spitzbergen and funded their operations.
Mary Steinberg (メアリー・シュタインベルグ, Mearī Shutainberugu)
Voiced by: Manami Numakura (Japanese); Kylie Stewart (English)
An associate of Juzo's, a young woman who performs back-alley maintenance on Extended in the mafia-controlled Kyusei Pit immigrant district, one of the few places in the city not under Berühren Corp control. She provides Juzo with medicated cigarettes after he loses access to his favorite brand. She and her brother Victor were orphans taken in by an engineer named Emmett. Mary became a mechanic hoping to reunite with her mechanic brother Victor who went missing during the war. She eventually installs an Extension on herself that replaces her breasts with two missile launchers, which noticeably increase her bust size when loaded.
Olivier Vandeberme (オリビエ・ファンデベルメ, Oribie Fandeberume)
Voiced by: Yoko Hikasa (Japanese); Marissa Lenti (English)
The director of EMS, a branch of the Reconstruction Agency tasked with enforcing Extended law and regulating Over-Extended. She has granted Juzo some leniency and autonomy despite the Over-Extended laws in exchange for him performing the occasional under-the-table job for her. She wears distinctive blue lipstick and carries a can of surströmming on her person at all times as a memento of her father.
Kronen von Wolf (クローネン・フォン・ウルフ, Kurōnen fon Urufu)
Voiced by: Yūya Uchida (Japanese); John Burgmeier (English)
An EMS section chief and staunch believer in EMS' duty towards enforcing Extended regulations. He distrusts all Extended, especially Over-Extended like Juzo, believing them to be no more than unstable machines. His weapons of choice are thrown needles, which he embeds in pressure points to disable Extensions.
Avi Kobo (アヴィ・コーボ, Avui Kōbo)
Voiced by: Masayuki Katô (Japanese); Brendan Blaber (English)
Acting director of EMS following Olivier's suspension. Despite his attitude towards Extensions, he possesses an Extension that lines his skin with sensors he relates to ampullae of Lorenzini, allowing him to detect electrical impulses around him.
Andy Wachowski (アンディ・ウォシャウスキー, Andi Uoshausukī)
Voiced by: Itohiro (Japanese); Charles C. Campbell (English)
A representative of Spitzbergen, a quasi-religious organization that opposes all Extensions, seeing them as an affront against God. He has a severely weakened body and uses a wheelchair. His brother Lawrence was a high achiever who eventually joined the military during the war, but lost both legs when the train transporting him to his first posting derailed, leaving him extremely bitter. Wachowski dedicated himself to research and is known as the father of Extension technology for his extensive contribution to developing the first generation of Extensions. He was employed as an engineer by Berühren Corp, which was originally formed purely for research and development into Extension technology to help humanity. He believes that the company misused his technology and accuses the senior officers of the company, a group known as Wurzel (from German, meaning "root") consisting of Chief Science Officer (CSO) Strange, Chief Technology Officer (CTO) Dreamy, Chief Medical Officer (CMO) Timid, and Chief Operating Officer (COO) Honest, of changing its objectives into a means of allowing the aging Wurzel to achieve immortality.
Pepper (ペッパー, Peppā)
Voiced by: Inori Minase (Japanese); Marianne Bray (English)
A Berühren Corp agent who is Seven's handler and the younger sister of Karen. Pepper's right forearm is an Extension known as a Hands Unit, which resembles a large mechanical hand with a revolver cylinder replacing the forearm. This Extension allows Pepper to unlock a Gun Slave Unit's full function by pulling the trigger mechanism on their back. Her weapon of choice is a large cleaver, which she uses whenever Seven is otherwise unable to defend her. Pepper's body is generally incompatible with Extension technology, meaning she was considered worthless to Berühren Corp until showing compatibility with the Hands Unit and the ability to tame Seven, who was once a notoriously temperamental Gun Slave Unit. To that end, she considers herself Seven's "owner." Pepper is not her real name, as she was stripped of everything that belonged to her, including her former identity, once she was taken in by Berühren Corp as a young girl.
Seven (セブン, Sebun)
Voiced by: Yūko Sanpei (Japanese); Kimmie Britt (English)
A Gun Slave Unit partnered with Pepper and working for Berühren Corp. Seven has a personality much like a young boy and is often seen eating lollipops, which serve the same function as Juzo's cigarettes. Unlike Juzo's head, which resembles a revolver, Seven's head more closely resembles a modern semi-automatic handgun. His right hand is a three-pronged claw appendage containing a powerful shotgun-like cannon that fires a mass of pellets known as Sturm Faust (German for "Storm Fist"). Seven was formerly known as "Device #7," an unstable berserker imprisoned by Berühren Corp until "tamed" by Pepper. He shows absolute devotion to Pepper, seeing himself as "hers" and showing irritation when she expresses interest in "owning" Juzo.
Kunugi (功木 (くぬぎ))
Voiced by: Takahiro Sakurai (Japanese); Jacob Eiseman (English)
A member of Spitzbergen and former associate of Kronen von Wolf. He expresses a similar distaste for Extended and arms himself with a golden revolver that can fire needles into pressure points.
Hugh Cunningham (ヒュー・カニンガム, Hyū Kaningamu)
Voiced by: Yōji Ueda (Japanese); Tyler Walker (English)
Chief of security at Berühren Corp and an enforcer tasked with retrieving Tetsurō. He operates under the fanatical belief that people are replaceable cogs in a machine that exists only to serve Berühren Corp.
Karen (カレン)
Voiced by: Reina Ueda (Japanese); Emily Neves (English)
A high level Berühren Corp operative who held Tetsurō captive, posing as a nun. She is the older sister of Pepper. Her Extensions include an artificial eye that assists her in aiming her double-barreled revolver.
Christina Matsuzaki (クリスティーナ松崎, Kurisutīna Matsuzaki)
Voiced by: Masashi Ebara (Japanese); Jeremy Inman (English)
Juzo's overbearing and doting landlord.
Scarlett Gosling (スカーレット・ゴズリング, Sukāretto Gozuringu)
Voiced by: Marika Kōno (Japanese); Macy Anne Johnson (English)
A neighbor of Juzo and daughter of an elderly barber who cleans and services Juzo's head. She has a notable stutter and seems to have a crush on Juzo.
Tokisada Mega-Armed (Sai Tokisada) (メガアームド斎時定 (さい ときさだ), Megaāmudo Toki Tokisada (Sai Tokisada))
Voiced by: Kenyu Horiuchi (Japanese); Christopher R. Sabat (English)
Also known as "Armed Sai," Tokisada is a popular celebrity considered a hero by the public for being the first person to undergo full-body Extension during the war. Tokisada is one of two still-living members of Tindalos, a group recognized as the first generation of Extended, the other being Hayden Gondry. Tokisada's Extensions, which include a large number of built-in weapons (hence the nickname "Mega-Armed"), served as test prototypes for equipment later installed in other full-body models like the Gun Slave Units, including the same Funke Faust hand weapon.
Hayden Gondry (ヘイデン・ゴンドリー, Heiden Gondorī)
Voiced by: Atsushi Imaruoka (Japanese); John Swasey (English)
An Over-Extended fugitive and former member of Tindalos who escapes from EMS while being transported to a Berühren Corp facility. Hayden is infamous for being the perpetrator of the Nightmare of Norse Scott, an incident where he murdered several people, including many of his wartime squad mates and Olivier's father, before being apprehended. Many details about the incident, including the fact that his rampage was caused by dangerous Extension experiments performed on the Tindalos members, were covered up over the years to preserve the public's opinion on Extension technology. Gondry's Over-Extended body is specifically designed for stealthy assassinations and is only vaguely humanoid, featuring a head with two faces mounted on thin limbs and a cloak of light-refracting camouflage plates, which allow him to cloak and disguise himself.
Colt (コルト, Koruto)
Voiced by: Makoto Furukawa (Japanese); Jason Liebrecht (English)
A young immigrant man who has illegal extensions so that he can work at construction sites to support his family. He agreed to work for Spitzbergen to make enough money to pay for surgery on his mother who suffered nerve damage through a defective Berühren extension.
John Podpie (ジョン・ポッドパイ, Jon Poddopai)
Voiced by: Yutaka Aoyama (Japanese); Larry Brantley (English)
An old man with Extended eyes capable of image analysis using the Multiple Alternative Light Sources (MALS) system which utilizes ultraviolet and infrared light to construct images for evidence. He was an analyst at the Security Department but was dismissed for misusing his ability to illegally take pictures of women's underwear and then selling them.
Victor Steinberg (ヴィクター・シュタインベルグ, Vuikutā Shutainberugu)
Voiced by: Kazuyuki Okitsu (Japanese); Cody Savoie (English)
Mary's older brother, a former Extended engineer who is now a sadistic Over-Extended serial killer known as the "Dismantler" due to his ability to quickly and expertly destroy Extended bodies. He was Juzo's personal engineer during the war and later gave Juzo his first job as a Resolver: protect Mary. He is aligned with Spitzbergen despite the organization's staunch anti-Extended views. It is later revealed that the Dismantler is merely a "shadow" of the real Victor's personality existing in an experimental sub-brain he developed. The "shadow" took control after Victor was traumatized by the brutality the Extensions he created caused in the war, using remote bodies to operate under the real Victor's subconscious desire to destroy all Extension technology. Victor's real body, including the experimental sub-brain, exists in an unknown location.
Edmund Baker (エドムント・ベーカー, Edomunto Bēkā; Jon Poddopai) / Theodore (テオドール, Teodōru)
Voiced by: Katsuyuki Konishi (Japanese); Christopher Wehkamp (English)
An Over-Extended with a motorcycle headlight and handlebars for a head. He saved Emma Kurtz from committing suicide over the death of her fiancé, Theodore, who was apparently killed in an explosion while in a bomb disposal unit after the war. Edmund and Emma were married, but after having a new arm Extension fitted, Edmund disappeared planning to kill his former partner, a Gun Slave Unit named Five, who he believed was hunting him. His arm Extension is a powerful electrical generator, which he uses in combination with a club weapon that embeds conductive needles in whatever it strikes.

== Media ==
=== Manga ===
Written and illustrated by Tasuku Karasuma, No Guns Life was serialized in Shueisha's seinen manga magazine Ultra Jump from September 19, 2014, to September 18, 2021. Shueisha collected its chapters in thirteen tankōbon volumes, released from February 19, 2015, to December 17, 2021.

The manga is licensed in North America by Viz Media. The first volume was released on September 17, 2019.

==== Volumes ====
No.	Original release date	Original ISBN	English release date	English ISBN
1	February 19, 2015	978-4-08-890124-4	September 17, 2019	978-1-9747-1045-4
2	August 19, 2015	978-4-08-890246-3	November 19, 2019	978-1-9747-1046-1
3	March 18, 2016	978-4-08-890402-3	January 21, 2020	978-1-9747-1047-8
4	November 18, 2016	978-4-08-890551-8	March 17, 2020	978-1-9747-1048-5
5	May 19, 2017	978-4-08-890649-2	May 19, 2020	978-1-9747-1051-5
6	January 19, 2018	978-4-08-890845-8	July 21, 2020	978-1-9747-1049-2
7	August 17, 2018	978-4-08-891089-5	September 15, 2020	978-1-9747-1708-8
8	March 19, 2019	978-4-08-891221-9	December 15, 2020	978-1-9747-1709-5
9	September 19, 2019	978-4-08-891373-5	March 16, 2021	978-1-9747-1707-1
10	March 19, 2020	978-4-08-891513-5	May 18, 2021	978-1-9747-1998-3
11	September 18, 2020	978-4-08-891684-2	October 19, 2021	978-1-9747-2343-0
12	April 19, 2021	978-4-08-891785-6	February 15, 2022	978-1-9747-2850-3
13	December 17, 2021	978-4-08-892172-3	December 20, 2022	978-1-9747-3450-4

=== Anime ===
An anime television series adaptation was announced in the April issue of Shueisha's Ultra Jump magazine in March 2019. The series is animated by Madhouse, produced by Egg Firm and directed by Naoyuki Itō, with Yukie Sugawara handling series composition and Masanori Shino designing the characters. Kenji Kawai composed the series' music. The 3DCG backgrounds, as well as the second season's ending animation, were created by Cyclone Graphics using Unreal Engine 4. The series ran for a total of 24 episodes in two seasons consisting of 12 episodes each, (Note: Despite English sources initially referring to the anime series in first and second parts instead of seasons, the anime's official website uses the notation ki (期), which is the direct Japanese equivalent to a season. Additionally, Crunchyroll's home media release of the series would later correctly refer to them as such.) having broadcast on TBS, AT-X, SUN, KBS, and BS11. The first season aired from October 10 to December 26, 2019. The second season was slated to premiere on April 9, 2020, but was delayed and instead aired from July 9 to September 24, 2020, due to effects attributed to the COVID-19 pandemic. For the first season, the opening theme is "Motor City" performed by Kenichi Asai, while the ending theme is "Game Over" performed by DATS. For the second season, the opening theme is "Chaos Drifters" performed by SawanoHiroyuki[nZk] feat. Jean-Ken Johnny, while the ending theme is "New World" performed by This Is Japan. Crunchyroll licensed the series for simulcast and an English dub.
