= Naoyuki Itō =

Japanese anime director

- 伊藤 尚往
- Other name: Naozumi Ito
- Occupations: Animator, storyboard artist, director

Naoyuki Itō (伊藤 尚往, Itō Naoyuki) is a Japanese animator, storyboard artist, and director. Some of his major works directed include the first Kanon series released in 2002, and Digimon Data Squad, the latter of which had a run of 48 episodes in 2006–07. In 2015, he directed the anime adaptation of the Overlord novel series.

== Filmography ==
=== Anime ===
List of production work in anime
Year	Title	Crew role	Notes	Source
2001	Grappler Baki: Maximum Tournament	Character Design		
2001	Kin'niku bandzuke kongō-kun no dai bōken! 筋肉 番付 金剛くんの大冒険!	Character Design	OVA series	
2002	Kanon	Chief Director		
2004	Futari wa Pretty Cure	Director	Episodes 1 and 30	
2004	Re:Cutie Honey	Director	OVA series	
2005	Futari wa Pretty Cure Max Heart	Director	Episodes 38 and 46	
2005	Iriya no Sora, UFO no Natsu	Director	OVA series	
2006	Digimon Data Squad	Series Director		
2007	Kindaichi Case Files Special	Director	Episode 1	
2012	Toriko and One Piece special	Director		
2013	DokiDoki! PreCure the Movie: Mana's Getting Married!!? The Dress of Hope Tied to the Future ja:映画 ドキドキ!プリキュア マナ結婚!!?未来につなぐ希望のドレス	Director	film	
2015–present	Overlord	Series Director		
2017	Kimi no Koe o Todoketai	Director		
2019–20	No Guns Life	Director		
