= List of K-On! episodes =

The cover of the first Japanese DVD compilation released by Pony Canyon on July 29, 2009.

The K-On! animated television series is based on the manga series of the same name written and illustrated by Kakifly. The episodes, produced by the animation studio Kyoto Animation, are directed by Naoko Yamada, written by Reiko Yoshida, and features character design by Yukiko Horiguchi who based the designs on Kakifly's original concept. The story follows four Japanese high school girls who join their school's light music club to try to save it from being abolished. However, they are the only four members of the club, one of which has no experience with guitar playing.

Thirteen episodes were broadcast on TBS between April 3 and June 26, 2009. The episodes began airing on subsequent networks at later dates which include BS-TBS, MBS, and CBC. The widescreen version aired on BS-TBS between April 26 and July 19, 2009. Seven BD/DVD compilation volumes were released by Pony Canyon between July 29, 2009, and January 20, 2010. An additional original video animation episode was released with the final BD/DVD volume on January 20, 2010. Both an English-subtitled and English-dubbed version by Red Angel Media began airing on March 16, 2010, on Animax Asia. At their industry panel at Anime Expo 2010, anime distributor Bandai Entertainment announced that they have acquired the first season of K-On! for a BD/DVD release. A second season titled K-On!! (with two exclamation marks) aired in Japan between April 7, 2010, and September 29, 2010, with 26 episodes. The episodes aired in HD format in Japan. An OVA episode was included with the ninth BD/DVD volume of the second season released on March 16, 2011. An English dubbed version of this season began airing on Animax Asia starting October 20, 2010. The second season was licensed by Sentai Filmworks and released in two BD/DVD collections in North America between June and August 2012. An animated film based on the series was released in Japanese theaters on December 3, 2011, and was later released on BD and DVD on July 18, 2012. Sentai Filmworks released the film in North America on May 21, 2013.

Two pieces of theme music are used for the first season; one opening theme and one ending theme. The opening theme is "Cagayake! Girls" by the Sakura High School Light Music Club (Yui Hirasawa (Aki Toyosaki) with Mio Akiyama (Yōko Hikasa), Ritsu Tainaka (Satomi Satō) and Tsumuki Kotobuki (Minako Kotobuki), along with Azusa Nanako (Ayana Taketatsu) starting in episode nine). The ending theme is "Don't Say Lazy" by the Sakura High School Light Music Club (Akiyama (Hikasa) with Hirasawa (Toyosaki), Tainaka (Satō) and Kotobuki (Kotobuki)). From episode nine, the opening video features Azusa, and also features some minor changes to the music, particularly an additional guitar part during certain segments (alongside the initial two). Four pieces of theme music are used for the second season; two opening themes and two ending themes. For the first 13 episodes, the opening theme is "Go! Go! Maniac" and the ending theme is "Listen!!". For episodes 14 onwards, the opening theme is "Utauyo!! Miracle" while the ending theme is "No, Thank You!". The songs from the second season are performed by After School Tea Time (Hirasawa (Toyosaki), Akiyama (Hikasa), Tainaka (Satō), Kotobuki (Kotobuki), and Nanako (Taketatsu)) with Hirasawa (Toyosaki) and Akiyama (Hikasa) singing lead vocals on the opening and ending themes, respectively. For the movie, the opening theme is "Ichiban Ippai" (いちばんいっぱい, A Lot of Number Ones), the main theme is "Unmei♪wa♪Endless!" (Destiny is Endless!) and the ending theme is "Singing!", all performed by After School Tea Time (Hirasawa (Toyosaki), Akiyama (Hikasa), Tainaka (Satō), Kotobuki (Kotobuki), and Nanako (Taketatsu)).

== Series overview ==
Season	Episodes	Originally released	
Season	Episodes	First released	Last released
1	13	3 April 2009	26 June 2009
2	26	7 April 2010	29 September 2010

== Episodes ==
=== K-On! (2009) ===
No.	Title	Directed by (Note: Information is taken from the ending credits of each episode.)	Written by	Original release date	English air date
1	"Disband the Club!"; Transliteration: "Haibu!" (Japanese: 廃部!)	Naoko Yamada	Reiko Yoshida	April 3, 2009	March 16, 2010
2	"Instruments!"; Transliteration: "Gakki!" (Japanese: 楽器!)	Noriyuki Kitanohara	Reiko Yoshida	April 10, 2009	March 16, 2010
3	"Cram Session!"; Transliteration: "Tokkun!" (Japanese: 特訓!)	Mitsuyoshi Yoneda	Katsuhiko Muramoto	April 17, 2009	March 23, 2010
4	"Training Camp!"; Transliteration: "Gasshuku!" (Japanese: 合宿!)	Taichi Ishidate	Jukki Hanada	April 24, 2009	March 23, 2010
5	"Supervisor!"; Transliteration: "Komon!" (Japanese: 顧問!)	Noriko Takao	Jukki Hanada	May 1, 2009	March 30, 2010
6	"School Festival!"; Transliteration: "Gakuensai!" (Japanese: 学園祭!)	Tatsuya Ishihara	Katsuhiko Muramoto	May 8, 2009	March 30, 2010
7	"Christmas!"; Transliteration: "Kurisumasu!" (Japanese: クリスマス!)	Noriyuki Kitanohara	Reiko Yoshida	May 15, 2009	April 6, 2010
8	"Freshman Reception!"; Transliteration: "Shinkan!" (Japanese: 新歓!)	Mitsuyoshi Yoneda	Jukki Hanada	May 22, 2009	April 6, 2010
9	"New Club Member!"; Transliteration: "Shinnyū Buin!" (Japanese: 新入部員!)	Taichi Ishidate	Reiko Yoshida	May 29, 2009	April 13, 2010
10	"Another Training Camp!"; Transliteration: "Mata Gasshuku!" (Japanese: また合宿!)	Kazuya Sakamoto	Katsuhiko Muramoto	June 5, 2009	April 13, 2010
11	"Crisis!"; Transliteration: "Pinchi!" (Japanese: ピンチ!)	Noriko Takao	Reiko Yoshida	June 12, 2009	April 20, 2010
12	"Light Music!"; Transliteration: "Keion!" (Japanese: 軽音!)	Tatsuya Ishihara	Jukki Hanada	June 19, 2009	April 20, 2010
13 (extra)	"Winter Days!"; Transliteration: "Fuyu no Hi!" (Japanese: 冬の日!)	Noriyuki Kitanohara	Reiko Yoshida	June 26, 2009	April 27, 2010
OVA	"Live House!"; Transliteration: "Raibu Hausu!" (Japanese: ライブハウス!)	Taichi Ishidate	Reiko Yoshida	January 20, 2010	April 27, 2010

No.	Title	Release Date
Summary	"Live!"; Transliteration: "Raibu!" (Japanese: ライブ!)	July 25, 2009
Ura–1	"Yui's Curiosity Series"; Transliteration: "Yui no Ki ni Naru Shirīzu" (Japanese: 唯の気になるシリーズ)	July 29, 2009
Ura–2	"Ricchan's Sudden Shots Series"; Transliteration: "Ritchan no Totchau zo Shirīzu" (Japanese: りっちゃんのとっちゃうぞシリーズ)	August 19, 2009
Ura–3	"Mio's Panties"; Transliteration: "Mio no O-pantsu" (Japanese: みおのおパンツ)	September 16, 2009
Ura–4	"Little Yui-chan"; Transliteration: "Chibi Yui-chan" (Japanese: ちびゆいちゃん)	October 21, 2009
Ura–5	"Light Music Club's Uninhabited Island Series"; Transliteration: "Keionbu no Mujintō Shirīzu" (Japanese: けいおんぶの無人島シリーズ)	November 18, 2009
Ura–6	"Animal Series"; Transliteration: "Dōbutsu Shirīzu" (Japanese: どうぶつシリーズ)	December 16, 2009
Ura–7	"Winter Chapter"; Transliteration: "Fuyu...no Maki" (Japanese: 冬…の巻)	January 20, 2010

=== K-On!! (2010) ===
No.	Title	Directed by	Written by	Original release date	English air date
1	"Seniors!"; Transliteration: "Kō San!" (Japanese: 高3!)	Naoko Yamada	Reiko Yoshida	April 7, 2010	October 20, 2010
2	"Clean-up!"; Transliteration: "Seiton!" (Japanese: 整頓!)	Tatsuya Ishihara	Jukki Hanada	April 14, 2010	October 27, 2010
3	"Drummer!"; Transliteration: "Doramā!" (Japanese: ドラマー!)	Noriyuki Kitanohara	Reiko Yoshida	April 21, 2010	November 3, 2010
4	"Field Trip!"; Transliteration: "Shūgaku Ryokō!" (Japanese: 修学旅行!)	Yoshiji Kigami	Katsuhiko Muramoto	April 28, 2010	November 10, 2010
5	"Staying Behind!"; Transliteration: "Orusuban!" (Japanese: お留守番!)	Taichi Ishidate	Jukki Hanada	May 5, 2010	November 17, 2010
6	"Rainy Season!"; Transliteration: "Tsuyu!" (Japanese: 梅雨!)	Kazuya Sakamoto	Reiko Yoshida	May 12, 2010	November 24, 2010
7	"Tea Party!"; Transliteration: "Ochakai!" (Japanese: お茶会!)	Hiroko Utsumi	Masahiro Yokotani	May 19, 2010	December 1, 2010
8	"Career!"; Transliteration: "Shinro!" (Japanese: 進路!)	Mitsuyoshi Yoneda	Katsuhiko Muramoto	May 26, 2010	December 8, 2010
9	"Finals!"; Transliteration: "Kimatsu Shiken!" (Japanese: 期末試験!)	Noriyuki Kitanohara	Reiko Yoshida	June 2, 2010	December 15, 2010
10	"Teacher!"; Transliteration: "Sensei!" (Japanese: 先生!)	Noriko Takao	Jukki Hanada	June 9, 2010	December 22, 2010
11	"Hot!"; Transliteration: "Atsui!" (Japanese: 暑い!)	Taichi Ishidate	Katsuhiko Muramoto	June 16, 2010	December 29, 2010
12	"Summer Festival!"; Transliteration: "Natsu Fesu!" (Japanese: 夏フェス!)	Kazuya Sakamoto	Reiko Yoshida	June 23, 2010	January 5, 2011
13	"Late Summer Greeting Card!"; Transliteration: "Zansho Mimai!" (Japanese: 残暑見舞い!)	Hiroko Utsumi	Masahiro Yokotani	June 30, 2010	January 12, 2011
14	"Summer Training!"; Transliteration: "Kaki Kōshū!" (Japanese: 夏期講習!)	Mitsuyoshi Yoneda	Jukki Hanada	July 7, 2010	January 19, 2011
15	"Marathon Tournament!"; Transliteration: "Marason Taikai!" (Japanese: マラソン大会!)	Noriyuki Kitanohara	Masahiro Yokotani	July 14, 2010	January 26, 2011
16	"Upperclassmen!"; Transliteration: "Senpai!" (Japanese: 先輩!)	Noriko Takao	Katsuhiko Muramoto	July 21, 2010	February 2, 2011
17	"No Club Room!"; Transliteration: "Bushitsu ga Nai!" (Japanese: 部室がない!)	Taichi Ishidate	Reiko Yoshida	July 28, 2010	February 9, 2011
18	"Leading Role!"; Transliteration: "Shuyaku!" (Japanese: 主役!)	Kazuya Sakamoto	Jukki Hanada	August 4, 2010	February 16, 2011
19	"Romeo and Juliet!"; Transliteration: "Romi Juri!" (Japanese: ロミジュリ!)	Hiroko Utsumi	Masahiro Yokotani	August 11, 2010	February 23, 2011
20	"Yet Another School Festival!"; Transliteration: "Mata Mata Gakuensai!" (Japanese: またまた学園祭!)	Mitsuyoshi Yoneda	Katsuhiko Muramoto	August 18, 2010	March 2, 2011
21	"Graduation Yearbook!"; Transliteration: "Sotsugyō Arubamu!" (Japanese: 卒業アルバム!)	Noriyuki Kitanohara	Reiko Yoshida	August 25, 2010	March 9, 2011
22	"Entrance Exams!"; Transliteration: "Juken!" (Japanese: 受験!)	Noriko Takao	Jukki Hanada	September 1, 2010	March 16, 2011
23	"After School!"; Transliteration: "Hōkago!" (Japanese: 放課後!)	Taichi Ishidate	Reiko Yoshida	September 8, 2010	March 23, 2011
24	"Graduation Ceremony!"; Transliteration: "Sotsugyōshiki!" (Japanese: 卒業式!)	Naoko Yamada; Kazuya Sakamoto	Reiko Yoshida	September 15, 2010	March 30, 2011
25 (extra)	"Planning Discussion!"; Transliteration: "Kikaku Kaigi!" (Japanese: 企画会議!)	Hiroko Utsumi	Masahiro Yokotani	September 22, 2010	N/A
26 (extra)	"Visit!"; Transliteration: "Hōmon!" (Japanese: 訪問!)	Mitsuyoshi Yoneda	Jukki Hanada	September 29, 2010	N/A
OVA	"Plan!"; Transliteration: "Keikaku!" (Japanese: 計画!)	Yasuhiro Takemoto	Reiko Yoshida	March 16, 2011	N/A

No.	Title	Release Date
Ura–1	"Fortune Telling for Everyone"; Transliteration: "Minna de Uranai" (Japanese: みんなで占い)	July 30, 2010
Ura–2	"Souvenir Stories"; Transliteration: "Omiyage Banashi" (Japanese: おみやげ話)	August 18, 2010
Ura–3	"I Want Siblings"; Transliteration: "Kyōdai Hoshii" (Japanese: きょうだいほしい)	September 15, 2010
Ura–4	"Childhood Dreams"; Transliteration: "Kodomo no Koro no Yume" (Japanese: 子どものコロのゆめ)	October 2010
Ura–5	"MC Grand Prix"; Transliteration: "MC Guran Puri" (Japanese: MCグランプリ)	November 2010
The girls have a contest to see who is the best MC.
Ura–6	"Ura-On! 3-Minute Cooking"; Transliteration: "Ura-On! Sanpun Kukkingu" (Japanese: うらおん! 3分クッキング)	December 2010
Ura–7	"Sakuragaoka Musical Productions"; Transliteration: "Sakuragaoka Kageki Dan" (Japanese: 桜が丘かげき団)	January 2011
Ura–8	"Once upon a Time"; Transliteration: "Mukashibanashi" (Japanese: むかしばなし)	February 2011
Ura–9	"Help Us! Yui-chanman / Light Music Club Rap"; Transliteration: "Otasuke! Yui-chanman / Keionbu Rappu" (Japanese: おたすけ! ゆいちゃんマン / けいおんぶラップ)	March 2011

No.	Title	Directed by	Written by	Release Date
Film	"K-On!: The Movie"; Transliteration: "Eiga Keion!" (Japanese: 映画 けいおん!)	Naoko Yamada	Reiko Yoshida	December 3, 2011 (theatrical); July 18, 2012 (BD/DVD)
