= Movic =

Company specializing in anime-related goods

Movic Co., Ltd.

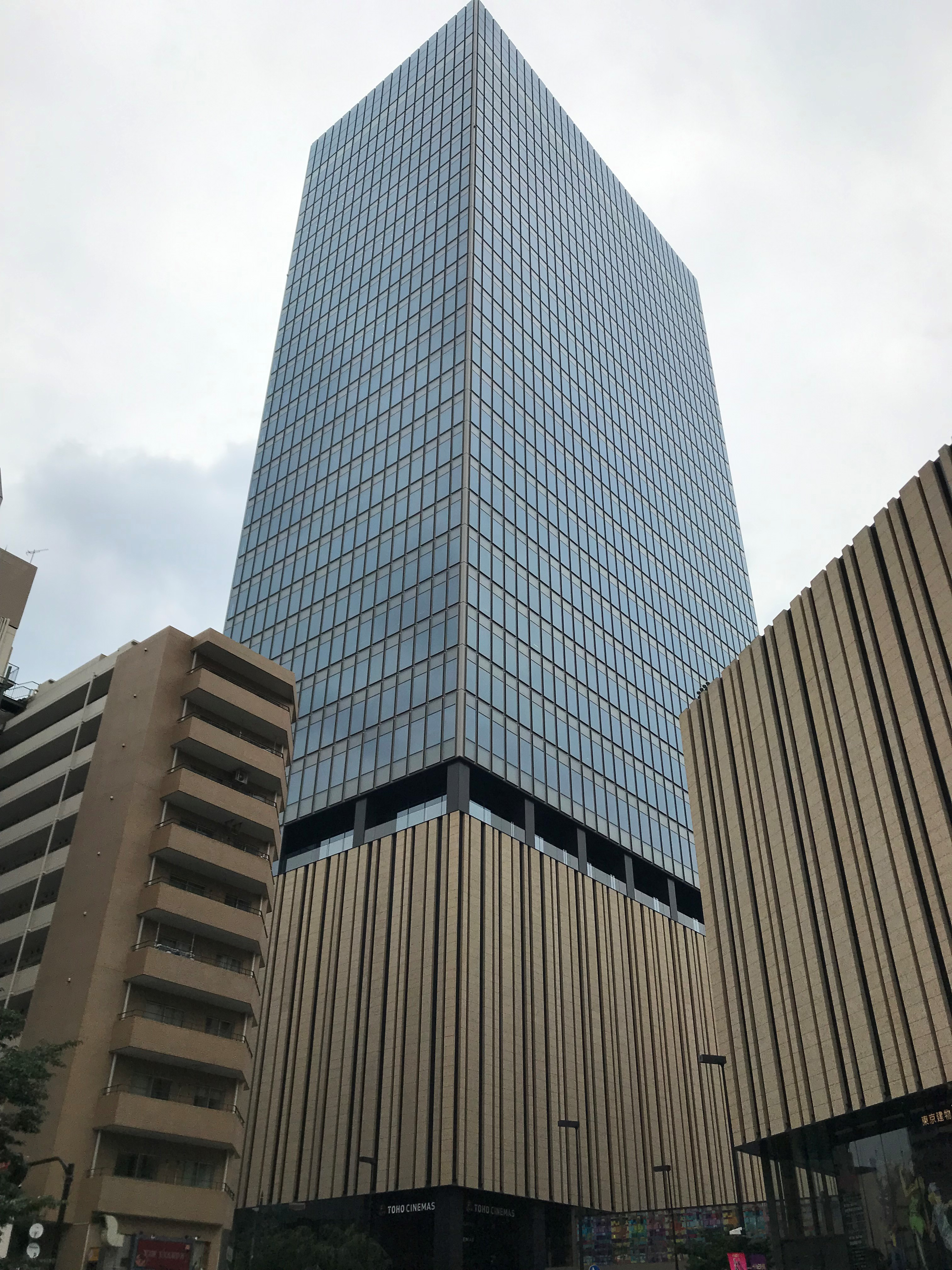
- Headquarters in Toshima, Tokyo
- Native name: 株式会社ムービック
- Romanized name: Kabushiki-gaisha Mūbikku
- Type: Subsidiary KK
- Industry: Anime and related media
- Founded: November 1983; 42 years ago
- Headquarters: Hiigashi-Ikebukuro, Toshima, Tokyo, Japan
- Revenue: 13.5 billion yen (2020)
- Parent: Animate
- Website: www.movic.jp

Movic (ムービック, Mūbikku) is a Japanese company which specializes in the publication of trading cards, figures, CDs, and other general media related to the anime industry. Movic is a part of the Animate group.

== Anime involved in ==
- Ah! My Goddess: The Movie: Production
- Ai City: Production
- Ai Yori Aoshi: Production
- Ai Yori Aoshi ~Enishi~: Production
- All Purpose Cultural Cat Girl Nuku Nuku: Production
- All Purpose Cultural Cat Girl Nuku Nuku DASH!: Production
- Android Ana Maico 2010: Production
- Anime Tenchou: Concept Work
- Appleseed: Production
- Araiso Private High School Student Council Executive Committee: Planning, Production
- Blue Exorcist: Production
- Battle Angel: Production
- Blue Seed: Production
- Blue Seed Beyond: Production
- Bounty Dog: Production
- Chobits: Production Cooperation
- Clannad: Production
- Clannad ~After Story~: Production
- Crystal Triangle: Production
- Dengeki Oshioki Musume Gōtaman: Gōtaman Tanjō-hen: Production
- Descendants of Darkness: Production
- DNA²: Production
- Dog Soldier: Shadows of the Past: Production
- Fushigi Yuugi OVA: Producer
- Gakusaver: Production
- Galaxy Fraulein Yuna: Production
- Galaxy Fraulein Yuna Returns: Production
- Gall Force - Eternal Story: Production
- Gall Force: The Revolution: Production
- Gokicha!! Cockroach Girls: Production
- Grandeek - Gaiden: Production
- Gravitation: Production
- Guyver: Out of Control: Production
- Hana-Doll: Production
- Judge: Production
- Jungle de Ikou!: Production
- K-On! season 1: Production
- K-On!!:Production
- K-On! Movie: Production
- Kanon: Production
- K.O Century Beast Warriors: Producer
- Martian Successor Nadesico: Producer of Trading Cards
- My Hero Academia: Production
- Neon Genesis Evangelion: Death & Rebirth: Production
- The End of Evangelion: Production
- Ninja Scroll: Production
- Nuku Nuku: Production
- Photon: The Idiot Adventures: Production
- Plastic Little: Production
- Puella Magi Madoka Magica: Production
- Pugyuru: Production
- Roujin Z: Production
- Sailor Victory: Production
- s-CRY-ed: Producer of Trading Cards
- Sengoku Basara: Production
- Shamanic Princess: Production
- Sorcerer Hunters: Production
- Sorcerer Hunters: Co-Production
- Sorcerous Stabber Orphen: Producer of Trading Cards
- Star Ocean EX: Production
- Starship Troopers: Production Cooperation
- Strawberry Marshmallow: Production Collaboration
- The Heroic Legend of Arslan: Production
- This Ugly Yet Beautiful World: Production
- Tokyo Babylon: Production
- Tsubasa RESERVoir CHRoNiCLE The Movie: Princess of the Birdcage Kingdom: Production
- Tsukihime, Lunar Legend: Production
- Ultimate Teacher: Production
- Umi no Yami, Tsuki no Kage: Production
- Vampire Hunter D: Production
- Vampire Hunter D: Bloodlust: Production
- Wanna-Be's: Production
- X Production
- xxxHOLiC the Movie: A Midsummer Night's Dream: Production
- Yebisu Celebrities 1st: Release
- Yu Yu Hakusho the Movie: Poltergeist Report: Production
