= List of Tamako Market episodes =

Tamako Market
- The main characters from left to right: Mochizo Ōji, Dera Mochimazzi, Tamako Kitashirakawa, and Anko Kitashirakawa.
- No. of episodes: 12

Release
- Original network: Tokyo MX, Sun TV, KBS, TV Aichi, BS11, Animax
- Original release: January 10 – March 28, 2013

Season chronology
- ← Previous; K-On!!

Tamako Market is a 2013 anime television series produced by Kyoto Animation that aired in Japan between January 10 and March 28, 2013. The series is directed by Naoko Yamada, written by Reiko Yoshida, and features character design by Yukiko Horiguchi who based the designs on K-On! which was adapted from the manga of the same name that aired from 2009 to 2010, whom the same production staff was utilized. It revolves around Tamako Kitashirakawa, the elder daughter of a mochi shop owner in the Usagiyama Shopping District, who one day encounters a talking bird named Dera.

The opening and ending themes respectively are "Dramatic Market Ride" (ドラマチックマーケットライド, Doramachikku Māketto Raido) and "Neguse" (ねぐせ; Bedhead), both performed by Aya Suzaki. The anime has been licensed in North America by Sentai Filmworks and is streamed on Anime Network. An animated film, Tamako Love Story, was released in Japanese theaters on April 26, 2014.

== Episodes ==
No.	Title (Note: All titles taken from Hidive)	Directed by	Written by	Original release date
1	"That Girl is a Daughter of a Mochi Shop Owner"; Transliteration: "Anoko wa Kawaii Mochiya no Musume (lit. 'She's the Cute Girl from the Mochi Shop')" (Japanese: あの娘はかわいいもち屋の娘)	Naoko Yamada	Reiko Yoshida	January 10, 2013
While shopping for some flowers in her local market, Tamako Kitashirakawa – the daughter of a mochi shop owner – encounters a peculiar talking bird named Dera Mochimazzi that decides to follow her home. As Tamako and her younger sister Anko go to the public baths later that evening, Dera has Tamako's childhood friend, Mochizō Ōji, take him to the baths as well. With New Year's Eve arriving and Dera having put on weight after gaining an affection for mochi, he almost chokes on a mochi, prompting the neighborhood to help him out, overlooking Tamako's birthday.
2	"The Love and Bloom of Valentines"; Transliteration: "Koi no Hanasaku Barentain (lit. 'Valentine's Day, Where the Flowers of Love Bloom')" (Japanese: 恋の花咲くバレンタイン)	Yoshiji Kigami	Reiko Yoshida	January 17, 2013
With Valentine's Day approaching, Tamako suggests the shopping district should prepare for a Valentine campaign. However, Tamako's father, Mamedai, is against the campaign, believing it to be too modernised. As Tamako and Mochizō start shooting a commercial for the shopping district, Tamako's friend, Midori Tokiwa, feels conflicted by feelings she starts having around Tamako. At the screening of the commercial, Dera eventually stands in for the projector by projecting the image through his eyes. When the commercial finishes, Dera shows another video, this time a video message from his home country. On Valentine's Day arrives, Midori slightly comes to terms with her thoughts.
3	"Hot Hot Hot Over That Cool Girl!"; Transliteration: "Kūru na Anoko ni Atchitchi (lit. 'Gettin' Hot For That Cool Girl')" (Japanese: クールなあの子にあっちっち)	Taichi Ogawa	Reiko Yoshida	January 24, 2013
As a new school year starts, Tamako and her friend Kanna Makino ends up in the same class as badminton club member Shiori Asagiri. That morning, Dera has a run in with Shiori and falls in love with her. After Dera ends up getting lost, Shiori escorts her back to Tamako's house, where Tamako attempts to become friends with her. Due to coincidental situations with her family, Shiori soon ends up staying for dinner and joining Tamako to the baths. The next day, Shiori tries to work up the courage to thank Tamako for the other day, but has difficulties overcoming her shyness. When Shiori ends up helping her homeroom teacher to Tamako's house for a home visit, Tamako takes her to a coffee shop, where she is finally able to convey her feelings of gratitude. Once the two become proper friends, Shiori gives her thanks to Dera for helping her out, though rejects his proposal of love. Afterwards, Tamako hears from Midori about how much courage it took for her to convey her feelings properly.
4	"A Small Love Has Bloomed"; Transliteration: "Chīsana Koi, Saichatta" (Japanese: 小さな恋、咲いちゃった)	Noriyuki Kitanohara	Jukki Hanada	January 31, 2013
Anko becomes disappointed that she cannot go a museum with her friends, including a boy from her class she likes, because the market is preparing for a festival. Luckily, her grandfather says Tamako will be able to go if she wakes up early and finishes up all her jobs. Meanwhile, Dera is cast as an ornament for the festival's shrine. As Anko prepares to go to the museum, the florist asks for her help in dressing up some children, foregoing the museum in favor of giving one of the girls her support. When the boys from her class arrives, Anko becomes embarrassed and shuts herself in the closet, but eventually comes out when one of the boys – Yuzuki – brings her a souvenir from the museum.
5	"We Spent The Night Together"; Transliteration: "Ichiya o Tomo ni Sugoshitaze" (Japanese: 一夜を共に過ごしたぜ)	Rika Ōta	Jukki Hanada	February 7, 2013
As summer arrives, the girls go to the swimming pool to teach Tamako how to swim while Dera learns of Mochizō's crush on Tamako. Dera decides to accompany Mochizō as he and the others go on a school trip to the beach and help him with his love troubles. When Midori learns of this situation, she chooses to stand against him, but the heat between them soon calms down by the next day as the gang watch some fireworks.
6	"It's Chilled Even My Spine!"; Transliteration: "Ore no Sesuji mo Kōttaze (lit. 'I Felt Shivers Down My Spine Too')" (Japanese: 俺の背筋も凍ったぜ)	Eisaku Kawanami	Michiko Yokote	February 14, 2013
Noting that not too many people come by the market during hot days, Tamako suggests they put on a haunted house to help cool people down. As Tamako, Midori and Kanna work on preparing the haunted house, Mamedai claims he saw some ghosts floating about at night, leading the shopkeepers to become paranoid, believing the market to be cursed. After a test run by Shiori and Dera, the haunted house starts gaining some attention whilst Shiori helps clear up some of the 'hauntings' the shopkeepers have been experiencing. The haunted house proves to be a huge success, drawing many customers to the market. At the wrap-up party, Kanna reveals she and Dera were behind the ghost sightings from before. When a shocked Dera falls over, his eyes project a video from the foreign prince once again, informing everyone that someone named Choi is coming to the market.
7	"That Girl Becomes a Bride"; Transliteration: "Anoko ga Oyome ni Itchatta (lit. 'She Became a Bride')" (Japanese: あの子がお嫁に行っちゃった)	Tatsuya Ishihara; Taichi Ishidate	Reiko Yoshida	February 21, 2013
Choi Mochimazzi, a fortune-teller from Dera's homeland, comes to stay at Tamako's house, revealing that both she and Dera come from the island's royal family. When Choi becomes annoyed by Dera gaining weight and forgetting his mission to find a bride for the island's prince, he claims he is being held against his will, leading her to be distrustful of the good will Tamako and the shopkeepers show towards her. As Choi tells fortunes as a means of paying back everyone's kindness, shopkeeper Sayuri Yumoto reveals she is getting married, much to the dismay of tofu shop owner Tomio Shimizu who had a crush on her. This leads Choi to think about her own unrequited feelings for the prince, leading to her getting a fever after passing out in the bath. After Tamako helps her overcome some of her homesickness, she becomes a bit more accepting of everyone's kindness. When she decides to stay until she can fix the communication system Dera has, she notices a peculiar scent coming off of Tamako.
8	"I Won't Let You Call Me a Chicken!"; Transliteration: "Niwatori Dato wa Iwasenē (lit. 'I Won't Let You Call Me a Chicken')" (Japanese: ニワトリだとは言わせねぇ)	Yasuhiro Takemoto	Michiko Yokote	February 28, 2013
Thinking his obesity needs to be addressed, Tamako, Choi and the others decide to put Dera on a mochi-free diet until he loses enough weight to fit into a birdhouse Kanna made. Wanting to keep watch over Dera to make sure no one feeds him, Choi goes to school with Tamako and the others, where she joins in on classes and helps Dera get some much needed exercise, before going to a used clothes store. As Dera shows up the next day with a curiously slim body, Kanna and Midori give Choi a sweater they made for her.
9	"I Will Sing Love's Song"; Transliteration: "Utatchaunda, Koi no Uta (lit. 'Breaking Out Into a Love Song')" (Japanese: 歌っちゃうんだ、恋の歌)	Yoshiji Kigami	Reiko Yoshida	March 7, 2013
As the Tamaya shop decides to put on a mochi pounding event for October 10, Mochi Day, Anko asks Tamako to set some daifuku aside for Yuzuki, the boy she has a crush on, but can't bring herself to face him in person. Asked by Tamako to help, Mochizō learns that Anko is depressed because Yuzuki is transferring to another school on Mochi Day. With Mochi Day arriving, Tamako gives Anko the encouragement to see Yuzuki off before he leaves. Receiving some fresh mochi Tamako gave Anko, Yuzuki tells her that they will see each other again when his family next comes to Tamaya for some mochi. Meanwhile, Tamako comes across Mamedai playing a familiar song from her childhood. The record store owner, Kunio Yaobi, tells Tamako and the others that the song was written by Mamedai for her late mother, Hinako.
10	"Flowers Bloom on That Girl's Baton"; Transliteration: "Anoko no Baton ni Hana ga Saku" (Japanese: あの子のバトンに花が咲く)	Taichi Ogawa	Michiko Yokote	March 14, 2013
With the school cultural festival approaching, the Baton Club eventually gets a key timeslot for the main stage. However, Midori struggles to come up with some choreography for their performance, finding herself unable to admit it to Tamako and the others. As Midori becomes more stressed, leading to her catching a fever, Shiori mentions to Tamako and Kanna about Midori's worries. The next day, Tamako and the others visit Midori after hearing about her fever, she admits that she had been unable to come up with any choreography and is overcome with guilt. After Dera cheers her up by performing an amusing dance, Tamako, Kanna and Shiori help Midori come up with choreography, managing to come up with something come the day of the festival. When Choi comes to the school to give the club her support, she notices a particular mark on Tamako's neck, later announcing to Tamako that she is a candidate to become her prince's bride.
11	"I Never Knew That Girl Would Be a Princess!"; Transliteration: "Masaka Anoko ga Purinsesu (lit. 'There's No Way That Girl is a Princess')" (Japanese: まさかあの娘がプリンセス)	Noriyuki Kitanohara	Reiko Yoshida	March 21, 2013
As word spreads about Tamako allegedly being a princess, Tamako herself is more focused on collecting enough loyalty points to receive a medal from the shopping district. After Tamako earns her medal, Choi manages to fix Dera's communication features and get in contact with the prince, Mecha, who exchanges some words with Tamako before Dera breaks down again. Whilst Tamako herself feels she is not a princess, the neighbourhood have a meeting concerning Tamako, feeling she should go, but Tamako herself feels otherwise. The next morning, Tamako panics when she cannot find her medal, only to be given it by Mecha himself.
12	"This Year Too, Has Come to a Close"; Transliteration: "Kotoshi mo Mata Kuretetta (lit. 'Another Year Closes Again')" (Japanese: 今年もまた暮れてった)	Tatsuya Ishihara	Reiko Yoshida	March 28, 2013
Upon Mecha's arrival, the whole shopping district's attention shifts towards him, while Tamako feels a little confused by everything; the empty shopping district begins to remind her of when her mother died. When asked by Dera about what she thinks of the whole bride business, Tamako talks about how much the district has meant to her over the years. Tamako rushes to turn down Mecha's proposal, only to learn that she is not actually a candidate, as Choi has misunderstood things. After the girls see them off, Choi and Mecha head back to their home country, only to realize they have left Dera behind. On New Year's Day, Dera attempts to head back home by hiding himself in a bouquet, only to wind up in a box Mochizō has ordered for Tamako's birthday and end up right back on Tamako's doorstep.

=== Bonus episodes ===
The following episodes are included on DVD/Blu-ray Disc volumes.

No.	Title (Note: All titles taken from Hidive)	Directed by	Written by	Original release date
1	"Dera's Bar 1" (Japanese: デラ's BAR 1)	March 20, 2013		
Dera has trouble teaching Tamako and her friends about how to behave in a bar.
2	"Dera's Bar 2" (Japanese: デラ's BAR 2)	April 17, 2013		
Dera talks to the girls about how to become cuter.
3	"Dera's Bar 3" (Japanese: デラ's BAR 3)	May 15, 2013		
Dera plans for a makeover.
4	"Absent-Choinded 1"; Transliteration: "Otchoko Choi-chan 1" (Japanese: おっちょこチョイちゃん 1)	June 19, 2013		
Choi takes the girls to a bathhouse.
5	"Absent-Choinded 2"; Transliteration: "Otchoko Choi-chan 2" (Japanese: おっちょこチョイちゃん 2)	July 17, 2013		
Tamako, Midori, Kanna and Choi are having a sleepover.
6	"Absent-Choinded 3"; Transliteration: "Otchoko Choi-chan 3" (Japanese: おっちょこチョイちゃん 3)	August 21, 2013		
Anko, Shiori, and Choi talk about love.

== Home media release ==
=== Japanese ===
Pony Canyon (Japan – Region 2/A)
Vol.	Episodes	Release date	Ref.
1	1–2	March 20, 2013	
2	3–4	April 17, 2013	
3	5–6	May 15, 2013	
4	7–8	June 19, 2013	
5	9–10	July 17, 2013	
6	11–12	August 21, 2013	

=== English ===
Sentai Filmworks via Section23 Films (North America – Region 1/A)
Season	Episodes	Release date	Ref.
1	1–13	September 9, 2014	
