= K-On! season 1 =

Season of television series

K-On!
- Season 1
- Key visual of season 1 featuring (from clockwise): Yui Hirasawa, Tsumugi Kotobuki, Ritsu Tainaka and Mio Akiyama.
- No. of episodes: 13

Release
- Original network: TBS, BS-TBS, MBS, CBC
- Original release: April 3 – June 26, 2009

Season chronology
- Next → K-On!!

The first season of the K-On! animated television series is based on the manga series of the same name written and illustrated by Kakifly. The episodes, produced by the animation studio Kyoto Animation, are directed by Naoko Yamada, written by Reiko Yoshida, and features character design by Yukiko Horiguchi, who based the designs on Kakifly's original concept. The story follows four Japanese high school girls who join their school's light music club to try to save it from being abolished. However, they are the only four members of the club, one of whom has little experience with guitar playing.

Thirteen episodes were broadcast on TBS between April 3 and June 26, 2009. The episodes began airing on subsequent networks at later dates, which include BS-TBS, MBS, and CBC. The widescreen version aired on BS-TBS between April 25 and July 18, 2009. Seven BD/DVD compilation volumes were released by Pony Canyon between July 29, 2009, and January 20, 2010. An additional original video animation episode was released with the final BD/DVD volume on January 20, 2010. Both an English-subtitled and English-dubbed version by Red Angel Media began airing on March 16, 2010, on Animax Asia. At their industry panel at Anime Expo 2010, anime distributor Bandai Entertainment announced that they have acquired the first season of K-On! for a BD/DVD release.

Two pieces of theme music are used for the first season; one opening theme and one ending theme. The opening theme is "Cagayake! Girls" by the Sakura High Club (Yui Hirasawa (Aki Toyosaki) with Mio Akiyama (Yōko Hikasa), Ritsu Tainaka (Satomi Satō), and Tsumugi Kotobuki (Minako Kotobuki), along with Azusa Nakano (Ayana Taketatsu) starting in episode nine). The ending theme is "Don't Say Lazy" by the Sakura High Club (Akiyama (Hikasa) with Hirasawa (Toyosaki), Tainaka (Satō) and Kotobuki (Kotobuki)). From episode nine, the opening video features Azusa, and also features some minor changes to the music, particularly an additional guitar part during certain segments (alongside the initial two).

== Episodes ==
No.	Title	Directed by (Note: Information is taken from the ending credits of each episode.)	Written by	Original release date	English air date
1	"Disband the Club!"; Transliteration: "Haibu!" (Japanese: 廃部!)	Naoko Yamada	Reiko Yoshida	April 3, 2009	March 16, 2010
Yui Hirasawa has just started high school and wants to do something for a change but can't make up her mind on whether to join a club or not. Meanwhile, Ritsu Tainaka drags her friend Mio Akiyama, who had already decided on a club, to join the light music club instead, only to be informed that its members have already graduated and it will be disbanded if it doesn't recruit at least four members by the end of the month. With Ritsu in drums and Mio in bass as the starting members, they come across and manage to convince Tsumugi Kotobuki, who initially wanted to join a different club, to join up with them. In order to attract a fourth member, the three each put up a poster for the club which catches Yui's eye. Misunderstanding the term "light music", Yui submits a form only to find out they were looking for someone to play a guitar, which she had no skill for. Despite this, the three members try to get Yui to stay, and after playing a short piece for her, she decides to join the club and learn the guitar, which she first has to buy.
2	"Instruments!"; Transliteration: "Gakki!" (Japanese: 楽器!)	Noriyuki Kitanohara	Reiko Yoshida	April 10, 2009	March 16, 2010
As they go looking to buy a guitar, Yui is drawn to a Gibson Les Paul which, to her dismay, has a price tag far beyond her current budget. The girls decide to get part-time jobs but is unsuccessful in earning enough to augment her funds. Yui then suggests that the others keep what they earned and decides to be contented with a cheaper guitar. When Yui is drawn again to the Les Paul, Tsumugi rises up to the occasion.
3	"Cram Session!"; Transliteration: "Tokkun!" (Japanese: 特訓!)	Mitsuyoshi Yoneda	Katsuhiko Muramoto	April 17, 2009	March 23, 2010
It is the time for midterm exams. Unfortunately, Yui spent more time on practicing how to play her guitar chords instead of studying and so ends up failing. Failure in the retest meant she cannot participate in club activities and so the club will be disbanded because of insufficient membership. A day before the retest, Yui begs Mio, Tsumugi, and Ritsu to help her. Mio comes through, but Ritsu is more of a distraction than help. Days after the retest, an exhausted Yui returns to the club room with perfect marks. To celebrate, the girls ask her to play the guitar chords she had learned so far, only to find that Yui has completely forgotten them.
4	"Training Camp!"; Transliteration: "Gasshuku!" (Japanese: 合宿!)	Taichi Ishidate	Jukki Hanada	April 24, 2009	March 23, 2010
Mio finds a box filled with stuff from the previous light music club in the club room, including a cassette tape of the previous club's performance at the school festival. After listening to it, Mio is inspired to get the gang together to practice over the summer break for the upcoming school festival. Worried about cost, the girls turn to Tsumugi, who just so happens to have a villa along the coast. They travel by train to Tsumugi's beachside villa, where Mio is determined to practice, however she is outnumbered and ends up playing around with the girls instead. After eventually getting some practice done in the evening, Mio is awed by the sight of Yui playing guitar in front of some fireworks. Mio confesses to the others that she wants them to be as good as the old light music club, playing the cassette tape for them. However, when tape flips to the backside, Mio is horrified by the shrieking intro of a vocalist in the old club. To cheer Mio up, Yui plays a perfect guitar solo and learns a new trick of vibrato on the guitar.
5	"Supervisor!"; Transliteration: "Komon!" (Japanese: 顧問!)	Noriko Takao	Jukki Hanada	May 1, 2009	March 30, 2010
The light music club is still not officially recognized, as they did not turn in a club form months before and have yet to find an adviser. The girls ask the music teacher Sawako Yamanaka to be their adviser. Though she initially refuses, it is discovered that she used to be a member of the previous light music club as a death metal enthusiast, and Ritsu uses that fact to blackmail her into becoming the adviser. As the club still needs a vocalist and lyrics, Mio writes a song called "Fuwa Fuwa Time", which is accepted, despite protests from Ritsu. Since Mio is too embarrassed to sing, Yui offers instead, but she cannot sing and play guitar simultaneously. Sawako teaches her to do so, but after all the training, she loses her voice. With only three days left to the school festival, Mio must perform the vocals herself.
6	"School Festival!"; Transliteration: "Gakuensai!" (Japanese: 学園祭!)	Tatsuya Ishihara	Katsuhiko Muramoto	May 8, 2009	March 30, 2010
On the day of the school festival, an anxious Mio wants to practice for the club's live event, but everyone else is obligated helping with their classes' other stands. They later get some practice done, but Mio is still nervous about singing center stage, with Sawako's costume choices not helping her mood. Ritsu holds a mock concert introduction to calm Mio's nerves. Although she still has jitters when the concert starts, the others encourage Mio to do her best, having seen practicing diligently beforehand. Though the show manages to become successful, Mio trips over the guitar cable as she leaves the stage, accidentally exposing her underwear (being shown as a rice bowl in the anime to avoid exposure) to the audience, causing a student to take a picture of her. She ends up getting a fan club, but is traumatized by her embarrassment.
7	"Christmas!"; Transliteration: "Kurisumasu!" (Japanese: クリスマス!)	Noriyuki Kitanohara	Reiko Yoshida	May 15, 2009	April 6, 2010
Yui's sister Ui Hirasawa remembers how Yui once attempted to give her a white Christmas when they were little, by putting pillow-stuffing on the tree outside. Ritsu decides to hold a Christmas party for the club, and while her initial plans of holding it at Tsumugi's house fail, they eventually decide to have it at Yui's house while Yui's parents are on vacation. Yui's friend Nodoka Manabe also gets an invitation. The girls decide to hold a gift exchange at the party, and go shopping for various gifts. Ui prepares a lovely Christmas dinner for the group, which gets a little out of hand when Sawako shows up out of nowhere. After the gift exchange, Yui and Ui end up giving each other just the right warm accessories for the winter. After the rest of the group leaves, snow falls and Yui and Ui decide to sleep together, though, unfortunately for Ui, Yui ends up hogging the sheets. In the New Year, the club decides to visit the shrine to make their New Year wishes.
8	"Freshman Reception!"; Transliteration: "Shinkan!" (Japanese: 新歓!)	Mitsuyoshi Yoneda	Jukki Hanada	May 22, 2009	April 6, 2010
Ui enters Yui's school as a freshman, as well as her classmate Azusa Nakano. When the class arrangements are announced, Yui, Tsumugi and Ritsu end up in the same class, while Mio ends up in a different class with Nodoka. The group puts up with Sawako's ideas of promoting the club by dressing them up as animals, even though it seems to be having the opposite effect. Ui and her classmate, Jun Suzuki, visit the club only to find everyone dressed as maids, but the girls soon change into tracksuits after finding it impossible to play while wearing the maid outfits. Meanwhile, Azusa walks around looking for a club that is right for her, initially passing up the light music club because they lack seriousness. The light music club gets ready for another live performance at the freshman welcome assembly, but Mio is still too embarrassed to do the vocals, so Yui does them instead. Yui forgets about the lyrics at the beginning of a song, but Mio manages to get over her shyness and back her up. Ui brings Azusa to watch the show, and Azusa is moved so much by it that she decides to join the club.
9	"New Club Member!"; Transliteration: "Shinnyū Buin!" (Japanese: 新入部員!)	Taichi Ishidate	Reiko Yoshida	May 29, 2009	April 13, 2010
Azusa officially joins the club, but is shocked to find everyone drinking tea and eating cake instead of practicing. She yells at them when Sawako tells her off for actually practicing, but Yui manages to calm her down with a surprising tactic. Despite her objections, Azusa finds herself weak against Tsumugi's tea and cakes. Yui herself is rather shocked that Azusa plays guitar much better than herself. Sawako brings a pair of cat ears for Azusa to wear, much to Azusa's discomfort, leading Yui to give her the nickname "Azu-nyan", as "nyan" is the Japanese counterpart of "meow". Noticing that Azusa is a bit upset, Mio encourages the band to practice more, but the group quickly reverts to its lazy state. Azusa then becomes frustrated, wondering as to why the band members she admired at the live performance behave as they do. After Azusa expresses her frustration, Mio explains to her that she stays in the band because they have fun performing together and because they like each other, thus convincing Azusa to stay.
10	"Another Training Camp!"; Transliteration: "Mata Gasshuku!" (Japanese: また合宿!)	Kazuya Sakamoto	Katsuhiko Muramoto	June 5, 2009	April 13, 2010
Azusa and Ui hang out together for the first time for lunch, joined later by a stealthy Ritsu. Yui and Ritsu invite Sawako to join their next training camp, but she appears uninterested. The gang arrive at an even larger villa than last year, though Tsumugi apologetically points out that it is still not as large as the one she had desired. Yui and Ritsu want to play and Mio and Azusa want to practice, but Tsumugi casts the deciding vote in favor of playing. Although Azusa objects, she ends up having the most fun anyway, even getting sunburned in the process. After practice, dinner, and fireworks, Ritsu suggests a test of courage, and Mio and Azusa are shocked by the sudden appearance of Sawako. In the middle of the night, Azusa discovers Yui practicing the guitar, and they bond. Azusa meets up with Ui again, saying that despite not practicing much, she enjoyed the trip as she got to know more about the group.
11	"Crisis!"; Transliteration: "Pinchi!" (Japanese: ピンチ!)	Noriko Takao	Reiko Yoshida	June 12, 2009	April 20, 2010
When Ritsu is reminded by Nodoka to fill in the stage-use application form in advance, the band members notice they do not have a name yet. Azusa inspects the rust on Yui's guitar strings, and it becomes apparent that Yui has never given her guitar maintenance before. They take it to the guitar shop, where Mio is entranced by rare left-handed bass guitars. After the guitar is repaired Yui realizes that she has to pay for the maintenance service, but has not brought any money with her. Though Tsumugi offers to pay instead, the shopkeeper, refusing to take money from her, tells her to consider it a free service. Later, Ritsu starts to become jealous of Mio spending time with Nodoka and begins to fall out with her. She ends up with a fever, so Mio visits and smooths things over, joined later by the other girls. Back at school, a recovered Ritsu gets in trouble for failing to turn in the application form on time, but Nodoka backs her up in front of the student council. Since the girls are unable to decide on a name for the band, Sawako makes an executive decision and assigns the name "After School Tea Time" to the band. Yui unfortunately ends up catching Ritsu's cold.
12	"Light Music!"; Transliteration: "Keion!" (Japanese: 軽音!)	Tatsuya Ishihara	Jukki Hanada	June 19, 2009	April 20, 2010
Yui is still sick from her cold, which is possibly attributed to her wearing a short yukata for too long. As the band tries to make do with Azusa as lead guitarist, Yui supposedly shows up over with her cold. However, her playing is too perfect and when she accidentally messes up her honorifics, it is revealed that she is actually Ui by Sawako, who had managed to play after a few days practice. The real Yui appears, but is still in no condition to play, so Mio tells her to stay home and recuperate until the day of the live performance. Yui eventually makes it in time, but forgets her guitar at home, so Sawako fills in for her while she goes to get it. Yui returns in time for the second song and the performance goes well, and the band even does an encore. But just as they're getting ready to play another encore, an irate Nodoka informs Yui and the rest of the band that their time is up.
13 (extra)	"Winter Days!"; Transliteration: "Fuyu no Hi!" (Japanese: 冬の日!)	Noriyuki Kitanohara	Reiko Yoshida	June 26, 2009	April 27, 2010
As the cold winter weather moves in, Yui offers to have nabe with everyone, but the girls are drawn away from each other by various concerns and obligations. Mio retreats to the beach alone to get inspiration for her lyrics, Tsumugi gets a part-time job at a fast food restaurant, Ritsu goes to a movie with her little brother Satoshi, and Azusa looks after Jun's pet kitten. However, Mio cannot think of any lyrics, Tsumugi buckles under the pressure of her first job, and Azusa is left panicked and uncertain what to do when the kitten seems to be ill. A random, silly text from Yui cheers up the others and she goes to help Azusa with the kitten, who was just coughing up a hairball. They all meet up for burgers at Tsumugi's restaurant later, where Ritsu is shocked to learn that what she thought was a love letter addressed to her were actually song lyrics Mio wrote.
OVA	"Live House!"; Transliteration: "Raibu Hausu!" (Japanese: ライブハウス!)	Taichi Ishidate	Reiko Yoshida	January 20, 2010	April 27, 2010
Ritsu's old middle school friend invites the band to perform at a live house on New Year's Eve. After viewing the place and distributing tickets to their friends, they soon get to know some of the other performing bands as they set up their routine. The girls become nervous while rehearsing, but the other bands encourage them to keep trying. They then perform to a packed room with great success, while Sawako meets one of her old friends. Afterward, everyone goes to Yui's house to see the new year in, although only Mio and Ritsu manage to stay up until midnight. Yui wakes everyone up to see the first sunrise of the new year.

=== Ura-On! ===
A recap episode showing all the performances from the first season aired on July 25, 2009. A series of three-minute shorts entitled 'Ura-On!' were included on DVD and Blu-ray Disc volumes.

No.	Title	Release Date
Summary	"Live!"; Transliteration: "Raibu!" (Japanese: ライブ!)	July 25, 2009
This is a compilation episode showcasing the performances by After School Tea Time and was only broadcast in widescreen format. The songs that are played include: "Fuwa Fuwa Time" (Mio lead singer with Husky Yui chorus), "Fuwa Fuwa Time" (Yui lead singer), "My Love is a Stapler" (わたしの恋はホッチキス, Watashi no Koi wa Hotchkiss), and "Calligraphy Pen: Ballpoint Pen (ふでペン 〜ボールペン〜, Fude Pen: Bōru Pen).
Ura–1	"Yui's Curiosity Series"; Transliteration: "Yui no Ki ni Naru Shirīzu" (Japanese: 唯の気になるシリーズ)	July 29, 2009
Yui has various thoughts she is curious about: one of Tsumugi, one of Mio, and the third of Ritsu.
Ura–2	"Ricchan's Sudden Shots Series"; Transliteration: "Ritchan no Totchau zo Shirīzu" (Japanese: りっちゃんのとっちゃうぞシリーズ)	August 19, 2009
Ritsu takes a series of surprise camera shots: one taking a shot of Mio, the second Yui, Tsumugi, and Mio on the scale, and a third with Yui smiling.
Ura–3	"Mio's Panties"; Transliteration: "Mio no O-pantsu" (Japanese: みおのおパンツ)	September 16, 2009
Shorts revolving around Mio's panties. The first has the girls memory sketch, only to fail at drawing Mio's panties, the second has Mio receiving panties from her fan club, and the third with Ritsu showing off her idea for the fan club's membership card.
Ura–4	"Little Yui-chan"; Transliteration: "Chibi Yui-chan" (Japanese: ちびゆいちゃん)	October 21, 2009
Ui has fond memories of her sister when they were little. First, the sisters are celebrating Christmas. Second, they learn how to wear tights. Third, Ui learns from Yui not to get lost in crowded places. Yui, however, is the one who gets lost now.
Ura–5	"Light Music Club's Uninhabited Island Series"; Transliteration: "Keionbu no Mujintō Shirīzu" (Japanese: けいおんぶの無人島シリーズ)	November 18, 2009
The girls get stranded on an island. First, Tsumugi gives some coconut juice to everyone. Second, Yui plays her guitar so that fish can be caught. The third, Azusa becomes homesick, which turns into a guessing game thanks to Ritsu of identifying pairs of legs. Finally, Azusa wants to leave the island with the other members.
Ura–6	"Animal Series"; Transliteration: "Dōbutsu Shirīzu" (Japanese: どうぶつシリーズ)	December 16, 2009
Based on Azusa's designation as a cat, Yui wonders what animals she and the other light music club members would be, with Ritsu giving her suggestions.
Ura–7	"Winter Chapter"; Transliteration: "Fuyu...no Maki" (Japanese: 冬…の巻)	January 20, 2010
The girls practice signing autographs, build snowmen, and get lectured by Tsumugi on how to cook nabe.
