= K-On!! =

Season of television series

- Season 2
- Key visual of season 2 featuring (from left to right) Tsumugi Kotobuki, Mio Akiyama, Yui Hirasawa, Azusa Nakano and Ritsu Tainaka
- No. of episodes: 26

Release
- Original network: TBS, BS-TBS, MBS, CBC
- Original release: April 7 – September 29, 2010

Season chronology
- ← Previous; K-On! season 1 Next → Tamako Market

The second season of K-On! animated television series is based on the manga series of the same name written and illustrated by Kakifly. The episodes, produced by the animation studio Kyoto Animation, are directed by Naoko Yamada, written by Reiko Yoshida, and features character design by Yukiko Horiguchi who based the designs on Kakifly's original concept. The story follows four Japanese high school girls who join their school's light music club to try to save it from being abolished. However, they are the only four members of the club, one of which has little experience with guitar playing.

This season, titled as K-On!! (with two exclamation marks) aired in Japan between April 7, 2010, and September 29, 2010, with 26 episodes. The episodes aired in HD format in Japan. An OVA episode was included with the ninth BD/DVD volume of the second season released on March 16, 2011. An English dubbed version of this season began airing on Animax Asia starting October 20, 2010. The second season was licensed by Sentai Filmworks and released in two BD/DVD collections in North America between June and August 2012. An animated film based on the series was released in Japanese theaters on December 3, 2011, and was later released on BD and DVD on July 18, 2012. Sentai Filmworks released the film in North America on May 21, 2013.

Four pieces of theme music are used for the second season; two opening themes and two ending themes. For the first 13 episodes, the opening theme is "Go! Go! Maniac" and the ending theme is "Listen!!". For episodes 14 onwards, the opening theme is "Utauyo!! Miracle" while the ending theme is "No, Thank You!". The songs from the second season are performed by Ho-kago Tea Time (Yui Hirasawa (Aki Toyosaki) with Mio Akiyama (Yōko Hikasa), Ritsu Tainaka (Satomi Satō), Tsumuki Kotobuki (Minako Kotobuki) and Azusa Nakano (Ayana Taketatsu)) on the opening and ending themes, respectively. For the movie, the opening theme is "Ichiban Ippai" (いちばんいっぱい, A Lot of Number Ones), the main theme is "Unmei♪wa♪Endless!" (Destiny is Endless!) and the ending theme is "Singing!", all performed by Ho-kago Tea Time (Hirasawa (Toyosaki), Akiyama (Hikasa), Tainaka (Satō), Kotobuki (Kotobuki), and Nanako (Taketatsu)).

== Episodes ==
No.	Title	Directed by (Note: Information is taken from the ending credits of each episode.)	Written by	Original release date	English air date
1	"Seniors!"; Transliteration: "Kō San!" (Japanese: 高3!)	Naoko Yamada	Reiko Yoshida	April 7, 2010	October 20, 2010
The light music club starts their senior year at high school. Yui, Mio, Ritsu, and Tsumugi, along with Nodoka, are all surprised that they have been put into the same homeroom class together. It soon becomes apparent that their new homeroom teacher, none other than Sawako, had arranged it that way so she had fewer names to remember. With Azusa being in only her junior year of the light music club, the gang become determined to get new members so that she will not be the sole member when they graduate. However, their various attempts to attract new students fail, so they focus instead on their performance for the freshman reception. Azusa becomes depressed that no new members show up afterward, but after talking with Ui and Jun and overhearing Yui's comments, she decides it is fine with just the five of them for now.
2	"Clean-up!"; Transliteration: "Seiton!" (Japanese: 整頓!)	Tatsuya Ishihara	Jukki Hanada	April 14, 2010	October 27, 2010
While clearing their personal belongings out of the club room, the girls find an old guitar that used to belong to Sawako. Since it had aged a bit, Sawako allows the girls to sell it and add the money to the club's budget. After visiting a home superstore to buy a storage shelf, they take the guitar to the music store where they are surprised to find it valued at ¥500,000. When Sawako inquires about the sale, Ritsu tries lying about its value, but it backfires when Sawako asks for a receipt and the club end up getting considerably less money. However, she allows the girls to buy one thing with the money. Noticing that Azusa looks a bit concerned about not having any freshmen to look after, the girls decide to get her a pet turtle, naming it Ton.
3	"Drummer!"; Transliteration: "Doramā!" (Japanese: ドラマー!)	Noriyuki Kitanohara	Reiko Yoshida	April 21, 2010	November 3, 2010
After noticing how badly she shows up in videos of the band's performances, Ritsu decides she does not want to be the drummer anymore as she does not stand out enough. She tries playing the guitar but cannot get beyond the basics. She tries the keyboard next, but only goes as far as playing with all the sound effects. The next day, Yui tries coming up with various ways to make Ritsu stand out, but with no such luck. Later that night, Ritsu recalls when she first started drumming and practicing every day. After watching a video of The Who in concert, she realizes that even though she is not always in the spotlight, she loves playing the drums. The next day, Tsumugi shows off a new song, calling it "Honey Sweet Tea Time", through the inspiration of when Ritsu tried playing the keyboard the day before.
4	"Field Trip!"; Transliteration: "Shūgaku Ryokō!" (Japanese: 修学旅行!)	Yoshiji Kigami	Katsuhiko Muramoto	April 28, 2010	November 10, 2010
The light music club seniors go on a school field trip to Kyoto. On the train there, Mio is a little annoyed at Yui and Ritsu's childish behavior. Mio realizes that she will have to watch over both of them during the trip. After visiting various shrines and attractions, the group returns to the inn where the bad habits of the girls continue to annoy Mio as well as Sawako. The next day, they have a look around Kyoto, though Mio laments that no one wants to participate in any tourist activities. However, when they get lost on the way back to the train station along with Nodoka's group, Mio gives in to the jokey nature of the others and loosens up for the rest of the trip.
5	"Staying Behind!"; Transliteration: "Orusuban!" (Japanese: お留守番!)	Taichi Ishidate	Jukki Hanada	May 5, 2010	November 17, 2010
Azusa, along with her classmates Ui and Jun, spend time together while the light music club seniors are on their trip to Kyoto. Noticing that Ui would be lonely without her sister around, Azusa and Jun decide to sleepover at her house, in exchange for Azusa helping out with her underclassmen in the jazz club. After spending the night, they wake up to a rainy day. They go to an arcade where Ui hits a home run in a batting game, before Azusa is reminded that she needs to feed Ton. While in the light music club room, the three decide to have a jam session together. The other girls return the next day and give Azusa a keychain, one of a set that spells out "light music club".
6	"Rainy Season!"; Transliteration: "Tsuyu!" (Japanese: 梅雨!)	Kazuya Sakamoto	Reiko Yoshida	May 12, 2010	November 24, 2010
On a very rainy day, Yui gets completely soaked trying to keep her guitar from getting wet. While Yui lets her clothes dry, she temporarily wears a maid costume made by Sawako until she gets told off about it. Azusa later helps Yui maintain her guitar. When it continues to rain the next day, the others recommend Yui keep her guitar in the clubroom overnight, though it causes her to worry late at night. The following day, Yui is so overjoyed to be reunited with her guitar that she brings it to class, but Sawako tells her to put it away.
7	"Tea Party!"; Transliteration: "Ochakai!" (Japanese: お茶会!)	Hiroko Utsumi	Masahiro Yokotani	May 19, 2010	December 1, 2010
Mio gets the feeling that someone is watching her, making her feel uneasy, though it turns out to be because she had a sticker on her hair. She is visited by Nodoka, along with a couple of members from Mio's fan club. The girls are reminded of the previous year, where Mio felt like she was being stalked by someone and went to the student council for advice. There, she met the former student council president Megumi Sokabe, who suspiciously appeared to know a lot about her and the light music club. It was soon revealed that Megumi was not only Mio's stalker, but was also president of her fan club who had wanted to see as much of her as possible before she graduated. As a graduation gift, Mio and the girls held a private concert just for her. After Megumi graduated, she passed the position of fan club president over to Nodoka. Since she had not found time to do anything for the club, Nodoka asks the light music club to hold a special tea party for them. Mio is initially embarrassed by all the skits, interviews and service she has to put up with, but warms up when she sees a slideshow of her times with the light music club. The event ends with a performance and a group photo, which Azusa sends to Megumi.
8	"Career!"; Transliteration: "Shinro!" (Japanese: 進路!)	Mitsuyoshi Yoneda	Katsuhiko Muramoto	May 26, 2010	December 8, 2010
While filling out university choice forms, Yui and Ritsu get in trouble for not being decisive enough about their future. Nodoka tells the others about how Yui somehow became friends with her after they met in kindergarten and how she has improved since joining the light music club. Mio and Ritsu later tell how they met and how Ritsu helped Mio when she was nervous about reading her award-winning essay in front of others in fourth grade. When Yui attempts to put "musician" as her career choice only to be rejected, Nodoka cannot help but laugh. Yui asks her classmates for some advice, but still gets confused, so she just says she will do her best for now, which is still rejected.
9	"Finals!"; Transliteration: "Kimatsu Shiken!" (Japanese: 期末試験!)	Noriyuki Kitanohara	Reiko Yoshida	June 2, 2010	December 15, 2010
As finals approach, Yui struggles with her studies. One of Yui's neighbors, a kindly old lady who has always taken care of her, tells Yui about an upcoming talent show event taking place right after finals. Wanting to pay her back, Yui decides to enter, though the others are concerned about her juggling two priorities. Azusa decides to join her act and help her study for finals. After their tests, Yui and Azusa perform their routine. Though they do not win, Yui gives her consolation prize to the old lady as thanks. Yui manages to pass her tests with high scores.
10	"Teacher!"; Transliteration: "Sensei!" (Japanese: 先生!)	Noriko Takao	Jukki Hanada	June 9, 2010	December 22, 2010
After Sawako gets a call on her phone from someone in the clubroom, the girls decide to follow her. They find her meeting up with one of her friends, and although they are easily noticed by her, she does not alert Sawako to their position. After Sawako leaves, her friend introduces herself to the others as Norimi, a guitarist from the band of the previous light music club called Death Devil. She reveals that one of their classmates is getting married and asked Death Devil to perform at the wedding reception, but Norimi cannot convince Sawako to join up with them due to her current image. When Yui and the others are unable to convince Sawako, Yui ends up taking the guitarist role in the band, much to Sawako's surprise. However, when Yui messes up and starts giving the band a cute image, Sawako steps up on stage to take Yui's place to show everyone what Death Devil is really about. Despite her secret shame being found out, she still remains popular with the freshmen.
11	"Hot!"; Transliteration: "Atsui!" (Japanese: 暑い!)	Taichi Ishidate	Katsuhiko Muramoto	June 16, 2010	December 29, 2010
During an unbearably hot day, the girls have trouble beating off the heat and also notice Ton shedding in its current aquarium tank. After dragging Sawako away from the air-conditioned staff room, partly to give Tsumugi a ride back to her house to get a bigger tank for Ton, the girls wonder why the club room does not have an air conditioner. After inquiring with Nodoka about it, it turns out that Ritsu never sent in a request for an air conditioner due to her never attending any student council club meetings. After pleading to the student council, the club room gets one installed. However, Yui slumps over, having forgotten that she is allergic to air conditioning.
12	"Summer Festival!"; Transliteration: "Natsu Fesu!" (Japanese: 夏フェス!)	Kazuya Sakamoto	Reiko Yoshida	June 23, 2010	January 5, 2011
With summer vacation starting, everyone initially decides to do another training camp, but instead they decide this year to go to a summer rock festival in the mountains, which Sawako conveniently has tickets for. After following Sawako's strict survival guide, the festival starts and everyone gets into it, especially Mio, although Tsumugi and Yui become depressed when they cannot eat the foods they want. Meanwhile, the girls shortly go separate ways to listen to different bands. While Mio gets entranced by a left-handed guitarist, Sawako enjoys headbanging to a heavy metal band far from the others. After a day of music, the girls sit under the stars, listen to the bands far away, and agree to perform at the next summer festival.
13	"Late Summer Greeting Card!"; Transliteration: "Zansho Mimai!" (Japanese: 残暑見舞い!)	Hiroko Utsumi	Masahiro Yokotani	June 30, 2010	January 12, 2011
With the other girls studying for their exams, Azusa hangs out with Ui. Throughout the day, Azusa spaces out and has weird dreams concerning the other girls. Later, Azusa, Ui, and Jun go to a swimming pool, where Jun starts to regret not joining the light music club. Afterwards, they run into Yui and the others for real and they all go to a summer festival together before Azusa, Ui, and Jun lose them in a crowd. Jun mentions that she might join the light music club if they cannot get any other members by next year. At the end of the day, Azusa worries about being all alone and promises to make the upcoming school festival performance a success.
14	"Summer Training!"; Transliteration: "Kaki Kōshū!" (Japanese: 夏期講習!)	Mitsuyoshi Yoneda	Jukki Hanada	July 7, 2010	January 19, 2011
Unable to get Mio to hang out with her, Ritsu runs into Tsumugi who decides to hang out with her. They go to an arcade and then to a candy store, where Tsumugi is fascinated by all the cheap items. Meanwhile, Yui has Nodoka over to help with her homework, and gets upset when she eats the strawberry off her cake. Later, Tsumugi asks Ritsu to hit her, wanting the same bond she has with Mio, but Ritsu cannot bring herself to do it. As a compromise, Ritsu attempts to train Tsumugi to be dopey enough that Mio would hit her instead, but to no avail. Hoping to make an opportunity, Tsumugi eats the strawberry off Mio's cake, but this just makes her cry. Having given up when a direct request to Mio also fails, Tsumugi finally gets hit when she implies Ritsu would be popular with the girls if she was a boy.
15	"Marathon Tournament!"; Transliteration: "Marason Taikai!" (Japanese: マラソン大会!)	Noriyuki Kitanohara	Masahiro Yokotani	July 14, 2010	January 26, 2011
Upon returning to school after summer vacation, the girls learn of a school-wide 5000 metres marathon race, which Yui is not keen on participating in. Seeing the marathon course while riding in Sawako's car does little to make her look forward to it. During the race, Yui constantly gets distracted and later everyone starts getting tired, trying to come up with various ways to keep them motivated. After reaching the top of a steep hill, the girls discover Yui has gone missing and go search for her. When Ui hears about this, she deduces that Yui had been staying at the old lady's house after scraping her knee. At the final stretch, Yui assumes that there will not be mochi served to the person in last place, causing everyone to make a dash for the ending, resulting in Mio, who did not want to finish last due to it being embarrassing, performing an extravagant roll upon tripping at the finish line. While everyone enjoys red bean soup and rice cakes, Sawako is still searching for Yui.
16	"Upperclassmen!"; Transliteration: "Senpai!" (Japanese: 先輩!)	Noriko Takao	Katsuhiko Muramoto	July 21, 2010	February 2, 2011
When Azusa comes to the realization that the light music club has been slacking as of late, she becomes determined to practice more. Azusa runs into Tsumugi alone in the club room and tries giving her some guitar lessons. She later is about to get a chance to practice alone with Mio, but is interrupted when Ritsu requires help from Mio and the girls end up spending the evening at Ritsu's house. The next day, Azusa runs into Yui in the club room hoping to practice, but ends up cleaning Ton's tank and helping her with understanding how to play the song Tsumugi composed, as she cannot read sheet music. Yui reminds Azusa that she is who she is, and personalizes her keychain.
17	"No Club Room!"; Transliteration: "Bushitsu ga Nai!" (Japanese: 部室がない!)	Taichi Ishidate	Reiko Yoshida	July 28, 2010	February 9, 2011
The club room is closed for repairs, leaving the girls nowhere for practice. While trying to find a suitable location for their practicing, the girls try to come up with lyrics for the song Tsumugi wrote. Failing to find anywhere in the school to practice, they rent out a studio, but end up wasting time discussing lyrics and run out of time before they can practice, though the club room reopens the next day. The following night, Ui helps Yui write some lyrics, but ends up catching a cold, leaving Yui, who has always relied on her, to look after her instead. Realizing how important she is to her, Yui writes some lyrics dedicated to Ui, which are approved by the other club members.
18	"Leading Role!"; Transliteration: "Shuyaku!" (Japanese: 主役!)	Kazuya Sakamoto	Jukki Hanada	August 4, 2010	February 16, 2011
Much to their dismay, Mio and Ritsu are respectively nominated for the roles of Romeo and Juliet in the class play. Mio has her usual problems with the pressure of being center stage, while Ritsu cannot act ladylike enough for her role. After not being impressed with having other girls train for them, Ritsu and Mio decide to have a cram session. While doing impersonations of each other if they switched roles, they find the key to successfully acting out their parts. Noticing Mio still lacks confidence, Tsumugi arranges for her and the others to work as maids in a high-end cafe to help get over her embarrassment. Although she gains some confidence, Mio insists it is different from being on stage. Meanwhile, Azusa grows concerned that, with everyone rehearsing for the play, no one is preparing for the live concert.
19	"Romeo and Juliet!"; Transliteration: "Romi Juri!" (Japanese: ロミジュリ!)	Hiroko Utsumi	Masahiro Yokotani	August 11, 2010	February 23, 2011
As the seniors prepare for the play, Azusa worries that there has not been enough practice for the live concert. As the play goes on, the backstage crew realize they are missing Juliet's gravestone needed for the climax, but manage to borrow a replica of the Rosetta Stone from the occult club in time. After a successful play, the girls apologize to Azusa for making her worry and decide to hold an overnight practice session at school. Later that night, they browse through the closed stalls, where they find the missing gravestone, and give their thanks to the occult club. The next morning, Sawako gives the girls special After School Tea Time T-shirts for their upcoming performance.
20	"Yet Another School Festival!"; Transliteration: "Mata Mata Gakuensai!" (Japanese: またまた学園祭!)	Mitsuyoshi Yoneda	Katsuhiko Muramoto	August 18, 2010	March 2, 2011
The girls get on stage for their performance and are surprised to find everyone in the audience wearing the same shirts as they are, which moves Yui a lot. During their performance, they sing two new songs, and Yui gives her thanks to the people who have helped her, and even gets thanks in return from the others. After their performance, the girls look back on their previous years and start to become upset knowing that this is their last year together, but manage to cheer each other up.
21	"Graduation Yearbook!"; Transliteration: "Sotsugyō Arubamu!" (Japanese: 卒業アルバム!)	Noriyuki Kitanohara	Reiko Yoshida	August 25, 2010	March 9, 2011
With photos for the graduation yearbook coming up, Yui uses Ui as a model to determine the best hairstyle, though feels weird when she leaves her hairpin on her. Although the seniors have finished their clubs, the girls decide to use the light music club room to study for their entrance exams, though Yui and Ritsu have yet to decide on their university choices. While trying to trim her bangs for her yearbook photo, Yui sneezes and accidentally cuts them off, giving her a completely different look. After their pictures are taken, the girls learn Mio had turned down a recommendation for a university because she wanted to study together with everyone. Upon hearing this, Yui, Ritsu and Mio turn in their university preference applications to Sawako, opting to go to the same women's university as Tsumugi.
22	"Entrance Exams!"; Transliteration: "Juken!" (Japanese: 受験!)	Noriko Takao	Jukki Hanada	September 1, 2010	March 16, 2011
As the seniors prepare for their entrance exams, Azusa decides to make them a chocolate cake for Valentine's Day, getting Ui and Jun to help. When the day comes, Azusa becomes nervous about presenting the cake to them and is also worried about their impending graduation. However, her friends encourage her and the cake is well received, even getting a speedy White Day gift from Yui. The next day, Azusa makes an expensive prayer at the shrine for the girls' success, and later receives word that they have all passed their entrance exams.
23	"After School!"; Transliteration: "Hōkago!" (Japanese: 放課後!)	Taichi Ishidate	Reiko Yoshida	September 8, 2010	March 23, 2011
Although they are not supposed to be at school until graduation the next day, Yui and the others decide to hang around the club room, though they have trouble figuring out how to pass the time. They clear out their desks and visit the student council room before getting Azusa to buy them some lunch. Wanting to leave something behind after they graduate, the girls decide to record an album of their songs.
24	"Graduation Ceremony!"; Transliteration: "Sotsugyōshiki!" (Japanese: 卒業式!)	Naoko Yamada; Kazuya Sakamoto	Reiko Yoshida	September 15, 2010	March 30, 2011
On the day of the graduation ceremony, Yui gets off to a rough start by being late and ripping her tights. Meanwhile, Azusa is similarly distracted and ends up banging her head. The girls hold on to a card signed by the entire class, though Yui's attempts to hide it during the graduation ceremony cause Sawako to grow suspicious. They later give Sawako the present as thanks for being their teacher. After the classroom empties, leaving behind several goodbye messages on a chalkboard for Sawako, the girls go to the light music club room, shortly followed by Azusa. However, Azusa, who had been holding in her feelings all day, finally breaks down into tears, begging them not to graduate. To cheer her up, the girls perform a special song that they wrote just for her.
25 (extra)	"Planning Discussion!"; Transliteration: "Kikaku Kaigi!" (Japanese: 企画会議!)	Hiroko Utsumi	Masahiro Yokotani	September 22, 2010	N/A
Set just after episode 21, Azusa finds the light music club's attempted recruitment video from before she joined the club, which was so embarrassing that Mio hid it in a cookie can. In order to recruit some new members for the next year, the girls try to come up with pitches for a new recruitment video, but to no avail. After talking with Ui and Jun, Azusa comes up with the idea of filming a documentary of their activities, intersected with interviews from fellow students and staff. The video turns out great, besides one scene at the end which Azusa is not too keen on.
26 (extra)	"Visit!"; Transliteration: "Hōmon!" (Japanese: 訪問!)	Mitsuyoshi Yoneda	Jukki Hanada	September 29, 2010	N/A
Set before episode 23, Nodoka arrives in the clubroom with a sample of the graduation yearbook. The yearbook needs to be checked by Sawako, who is sick with a cold. Curious about what her apartment looks like, the girls decide to pay her a visit. While looking through the album, they find a mysterious hand in the group photo, which turns out to be Ritsu's. Despite Sawako's objection, the girls decide to help her out around the apartment. They briefly visit Azusa, who is busy rehearsing for her freshman reception with Ui and Jun.
OVA	"Plan!"; Transliteration: "Keikaku!" (Japanese: 計画!)	Yasuhiro Takemoto	Reiko Yoshida	March 16, 2011	N/A
Shortly before episode 14, after receiving souvenirs from Tsumugi's trip to Finland following the summer festival, the girls decide to plan for an overseas trip after graduation. They practice various things for overseas travel, only to realize that, besides Tsumugi, none of them has a valid passport. While lining up to hand in their passport applications, Ritsu realizes she forgot her identity card so she sends her little brother Satoshi to fetch it. Mio needs to take a suitable photograph to complete her application, but keeps getting bothered by the others while attempting to take it. With everyone having their own ideas of where they would like to go, Yui suggests that they go on a second trip after Azusa graduates.

=== Ura-On!! ===
No.	Title	Release Date
Ura–1	"Fortune Telling for Everyone"; Transliteration: "Minna de Uranai" (Japanese: みんなで占い)	July 30, 2010
Azusa becomes a fortune teller, learning everyone's dreams in order to tell them about their former lives, which happen to be of various bugs.
Ura–2	"Souvenir Stories"; Transliteration: "Omiyage Banashi" (Japanese: おみやげ話)	August 18, 2010
The senior year girls talk about the souvenirs they bought during their school trip to Kyoto.
Ura–3	"I Want Siblings"; Transliteration: "Kyōdai Hoshii" (Japanese: きょうだいほしい)	September 15, 2010
Since Yui and Ritsu have siblings, the other girls wonder what kind of siblings they would have.
Ura–4	"Childhood Dreams"; Transliteration: "Kodomo no Koro no Yume" (Japanese: 子どものコロのゆめ)	October 2010
The girls look over the dreams they had when they were younger.
Ura–5	"MC Grand Prix"; Transliteration: "MC Guran Puri" (Japanese: MCグランプリ)	November 2010
The girls have a contest to see who is the best MC.
Ura–6	"Ura-On! 3-Minute Cooking"; Transliteration: "Ura-On! Sanpun Kukkingu" (Japanese: うらおん! 3分クッキング)	December 2010
Tsumugi acts as hostess to a cooking program as Azusa, Ritsu, and Sawako show off their meals.
Ura–7	"Sakuragaoka Musical Productions"; Transliteration: "Sakuragaoka Kageki Dan" (Japanese: 桜が丘かげき団)	January 2011
After the school play, Yui comes up with ideas for musical adaptations of their songs.
Ura–8	"Once upon a Time"; Transliteration: "Mukashibanashi" (Japanese: むかしばなし)	February 2011
Tsumugi and Ui retell fables with Yui and Azusa acting as some of the characters.
Ura–9	"Help Us! Yui-chanman / Light Music Club Rap"; Transliteration: "Otasuke! Yui-chanman / Keionbu Rappu" (Japanese: おたすけ! ゆいちゃんマン / けいおんぶラップ)	March 2011
Yui takes the role of a superhero and helps the girls with other tasks. At the end, the other girls wish Azusa luck with running the High School Light Music Club.

=== Film (2011) ===
No.	Title	Directed by	Written by	Release Date
Film	"K-On!: The Movie"; Transliteration: "Eiga Keion!" (Japanese: 映画 けいおん!)	Naoko Yamada	Reiko Yoshida	December 3, 2011 (theatrical); July 18, 2012 (BD/DVD)
The plot begins after K-On!! episode 22. After they are accepted by the same university, Yui, Ritsu, Mio and Tsumugi try to figure out a present to give to Azusa before they graduate, and they all decide to go to London for their graduation trip. Upon arriving, they end up having to give a performance at a sushi restaurant after being mistaken for Ritsu's friend's band, Love Crisis. As the girls enjoy the sights, Azusa seems to be rather cautious around Yui's odd behavior, having almost walked in on their plans before. Later, the girls are asked to do a performance for a Japanese Pop Culture Fair, where they are soon joined by Sawako, before they catch their flight back to Japan. Upon returning home, the girls perform a special live concert in their classroom. Afterwards, Yui, Ritsu, Mio and Tsumugi work in secret to prepare a special song for Azusa, which they present to her on the day of their graduation at the end of K-On!! episode 24.
