= Hana-Doll =

Japanese mixed-media project

- Hana-Doll*

華Doll*
- Created by: Movic
- Manga

Hana-Doll*: Flowering: Boys were still in a dream
- Written by: Ikuhiro Nao
- Published by: Kodansha
- Magazine: Shōnen Magazine Edge
- Original run: November 17, 2020 – October 15, 2021
- Volumes: 1
- Anime television series

Hana-Doll*: Reinterpretation of Flowering
- Directed by: Masahiro Takata
- Written by: GyroKnuckle
- Music by: Mitsunori Ikeda
- Studio: A-Real
- Original network: Tokyo MX, BS NTV, SUN, KBS Kyoto, TVA
- Original run: April 9, 2025 – June 25, 2025
- Episodes: 12

Hana-Doll* (華Doll*) is a Japanese 2.5D mixed-media project created by Movic, which consists of various drama CDs, music, and stage plays. A manga series with art by Ikuhiro Nao titled Hana-Doll*: Flowering: Boys were still in a dream was serialized in Kodansha's shōnen manga magazine Shōnen Magazine Edge from November 2020 to October 2021 and was collected in a single tankōbon volume. An anime television series by A-Real, titled Hana-Doll*: Reinterpretation of Flowering, aired from April to June 2025.

== Characters ==
Mahiro Yuki (結城眞紘, Yuki Mahiro)
Voiced by: Seiichiro Yamashita
Ryoga Kagekawa (影河凌駕, Kagekawa Ryoga)
Voiced by: Daiki Hamano
Lihito Tōdo (灯堂理人, Tōdo Lihito)
Voiced by: Kent Itō
Chitose Shorai (祥來千勢, Shorai Chitose) / Chise (チセ)
Voiced by: Wataru Komada
Kaoru Kisaragi (如月 薫, Kisaragi Kaoru)
Voiced by: Shun'ichi Toki
Haruta Kiyose (清瀬陽汰, Kiyose Haruta)
Voiced by: Toshiki Masuda

== Other media ==
=== Manga ===
No.	Release date	ISBN
1	December 13, 2021	978-4-06-526107-1

=== Anime ===
An anime adaptation was announced on June 19, 2023. It was later revealed to be a television series produced by A-Real and directed by Masahiro Takata, with GyroKnuckle overseeing series scripts. The series from April 9 to June 25, 2025, on Tokyo MX and other networks. The opening theme song is "Clockwork Flowers", while the ending theme song is "Fall leaves after fall", both performed by Anthos*.

==== Episodes ====
No.	Title	Directed by	Written by	Storyboarded by	Original release date
1	"Do Hana-Dolls Dream of Idols?"; Transliteration: "Hana Ningyō wa Aidoru no Yume o Miru ka?" (Japanese: 華人形はアイドルの夢を見るか？)	Marie Watanabe	GyroKnuckle	Masahiro Takata	April 9, 2025
2	"It's Not a Tragedy, But a Comedy"; Transliteration: "Sore wa Higeki de Naku Kigeki" (Japanese: それは悲劇でなく喜劇)	Marie Watanabe	GyroKnuckle	Tomoya Takashima, Yumika Aoyama	April 16, 2025
3	"The Invisible Flower Is in a Box"; Transliteration: "Mienai Hana wa Hako no Naka" (Japanese: 見えない華は箱の中)	Arata Nishizuki	GyroKnuckle	Yasushi Muroya	April 23, 2025
4	"Flowers Smell Sweet Even if You Call Them by Different Names"; Transliteration: "Hana wa Yobina o Kaete mo Amaku Kaoru" (Japanese: 華は呼び名を変えても甘く香る)	Tomoya Takashima	GyroKnuckle	Tomoya Takashima, Yumika Aomika; Yasutaka Tsukada, Shimako & Kumafukurō	April 30, 2025
5	"Clockwork Level Up"; Transliteration: "Tokei Shikake no Reberuappu" (Japanese: 時計仕掛けのレベルアップ)	Naoki Murata	GyroKnuckle	Hiroyuki Fukushima	May 7, 2025
6	"Once-in-a-Lifetime Encounter in Room 317"; Transliteration: "317 Gōshitsu no Ichi-go-Ichi-e" (Japanese: 317号室の一期一会)	Norihiko Nagahama	GyroKnuckle	Tomoya Takashima, Yumika Aoyama, Yasutaka Tsukada, Shimako, Kumafukurō & Yuki Togo	May 14, 2025
7	"A Knight Fallen into the Ripples of Tears"; Transliteration: "Namida no Hamon ni Ochita Kishi" (Japanese: 涙の波紋に落ちた騎士)	Marie Watanabe	GyroKnuckle	Hiroyuki Fukushima	May 21, 2025
8	"When the Sun Wakes Up"; Transliteration: "Taiyō ga Mezameru hi ni" (Japanese: 太陽が目覚める日に)	Naoki Murata	GyroKnuckle	Tomoya Takashima, Yumika Aoyama, Shimako, Kumafukurō, Yuki Togo & Meiko Matsumoto	May 28, 2025
9	"Stand By Me"; Transliteration: "Sutando・Bai・Mī" (Japanese: スタンド・バイ・ミー)	Norihiko Nagahama	Takanori Yamamura	Akira Nishimori	June 4, 2025
10	"Chocolate Box Contents"; Transliteration: "Chokorēto Bokkusu no Nakami" (Japanese: チョコレートボックスの中身)	Marie Watanabe	Takanori Yamamura	Yasushi Muroya	June 11, 2025
11	"I'll Come Back for You" (Japanese: I'll come back for you)	Kōtarō Ishidate	Masahiro Takata	Hiroyuki Fukushima	June 18, 2025
12	"More Human Than Human"; Transliteration: "Ningen Yori mo Ningenrashiku" (Japanese: 人間よりも人間らしく)	Marie Watanabe, Masahiro Takata	Masahiro Takata	Hiroyuki Fukushima, Masahiro Takata	June 25, 2025
