= Melody of the Boundary =

Japanese light novel series

- First light novel volume cover

境界のメロディ (Kyōkai no Merodi)
- Genre: Music
- Light novel
- Written by: Toshiya Miyata
- Illustrated by: Lam
- Published by: ASCII Media Works
- English publisher: NA: Yen Press
- Imprint: Media Works Bunko
- Original run: May 24, 2024 – present
- Volumes: 2
- Manga
- Written by: Toshiya Miyata
- Illustrated by: Ikuta Sugimoto
- Published by: Kadokawa Shoten
- Imprint: Kadokawa Comics A
- Magazine: Young Ace
- Original run: May 2, 2025 – present
- Volumes: 2
- Anime television series

Melody of the Boundary (Japanese: 境界のメロディ, Hepburn: Kyōkai no Merodi) is a Japanese light novel series written by Toshiya Miyata and illustrated by Lam. It began publication under ASCII Media Works's Media Works Bunko imprint in May 2024, with two volumes released as of November 2025. A manga adaptation illustrated by Ikuta Sugimoto began serialization in Kadokawa Shoten's Young Ace magazine in May 2025 and has been compiled into two volumes as of November 2026. An anime television series adaptation has been announced.

== Plot ==
The series follows Kyōsuke Tsurumaki and Kai Amano, two up-and-coming musicians who are members of a duo called Kanitama. However, after Kai is killed in a traffic accident, Kyōsuke quits music, living his days as a freeter. One day, while reminiscing about his past, a person arrives at his home. It turns out to be Kai, which surprises him as Kai was supposed to have died three years prior. Kai, who is showing the energy of his past self, encourages him to take up music again.

== Characters ==
Kyōsuke Tsurumaki (弦巻 キョウスケ, Tsurumaki Kyōsuke)
Voiced by: Kent Itō
A 22-year-old freeter who lives at home. He originally met Kai in high school and they formed a music duo called Kanitama, but Kai was killed in an accident before they could make their major debut. Deeply affected by the tragedy, Kyōsuke quit music and became disillusioned with life. However, after Kai suddenly appears before him one day, he decides to restart his music career.
Kai Amano (天野 カイ, Amano Kai)
Voiced by: Daisuke Sakuma
Kyōsuke's partner in Kanitama, who was killed in an accident three years prior to the start of the story. One day, he suddenly appears before Kyōsuke, motivating him to pursue music again.
Takeshi (タケシ)
Voiced by: Yuma Uchida
Makoto (マコト)
Voiced by: Shunsuke Takeuchi
Minoru (ミノル)
Voiced by: Soma Saito

== Production ==
Melody of the Boundary is the debut novel of Toshiya Miyata, a singer and actor who is a member of the Japanese boy band Kis-My-Ft2. Having been a long-time fan of anime, Miyata sought to create something that he would be known for outside of his entertainment career. At first, he sought help from staff members, but after someone advised him to write his own story, he wrote five drafts with the aim of having one published as a story. Of the drafts he wrote, he felt most attached to Melody of the Boundary and decided to pursue it. In writing the novel, he wanted readers to appreciate both the positive and negative aspects of the characters, with the two lead characters Kyōsuke and Kai being partly based on his own personality.

Miyata found it difficult to write the novel at first, having entered the entertainment industry at a young age and thus having limited formal education. He compared his challenges in writing to his own training in singing and dancing as a musician. As a result of his busy schedule, he would sometimes focus on writing late at night to the point of sleeping for only three hours. The illustrator Lam was chosen to provide the illustrations for the novel, with Miyata giving instructions on the characters and how to flesh them out. Miyata remembered being emotional when he first saw the finished volume and its accompanying drama CD, feeling joy at seeing his original idea come to life.

== Media ==
=== Light novel ===
The first light novel volume was published under ASCII Media Works's Media Works Bunko imprint on May 24, 2024. The second volume was announced on July 16, 2025, and was released on November 25, 2025.

In December 2025, Yen Press announced that they had licensed the series for English publication beginning in June 2026.

No.	Original release date	Original ISBN	English release date	English ISBN
1	May 24, 2024	978-4-04-915497-9; 978-4-04-915498-6 (SE)	June 9, 2026	979-8-8554-2878-0
2	November 25, 2025	978-4-04-916205-9; 978-4-04-916724-5 (SE)	—	—

=== Manga ===
A manga adaptation illustrated by Ikuta Sugimoto began serialization in Kadokawa Shoten's Young Ace magazine on May 2, 2025. The first volume was published on November 25, 2025. Two volumes have been released as of November 4, 2026.

No.	Japanese release date	Japanese ISBN
1	November 25, 2025	978-4-04-116609-3
2	November 4, 2026	978-4-04-117569-9

=== Drama CD ===
A drama CD featuring the voices of Kent Itō as Kyōsuke and Daisuke Sakuma as Kai was released together with the limited edition of the first volume. A second drama CD was bundled with the limited edition of the second volume.

=== Anime ===
An anime television series adaptation was announced on November 13, 2025. The cast of the series' drama CDs are reprising their roles.

== Reception ==
The series won four awards at the 2024 Next Light Novel Awards, including ranking first in the Paperback category. At the time of the second volume's announcement, it was reported that the first novel had over 100,000 copies in circulation.

The manga adaptation was nominated for the twelfth Next Manga Award in 2026 in the print category, and won the Nichirei Award.
