= Kent Itō =

Japanese voice actor and singer (born 1988)

Kento Itō
- 伊東 健人
- Born: October 18, 1988 (age 38); Tokyo, Japan
- Other name: 21SeikiP (21世紀P)
- Occupations: Voice actor; singer; composer
- Height: 180 cm (5 ft 11 in)
- Musical career
- Genres: J-pop; anison
- Instruments: Vocals; guitar; drum
- Years active: 2009–present (Singer/composer); 2011–present (Voice actor)
- Labels: Astro Voice (2022-2025); Pony Canyon (2025-)

Kent Itō (伊東 健人, Itō Kento; born October 18, 1988) is a Japanese voice actor, singer, and composer from Tokyo. He is currently affiliated with 81 Produce. He is also a music artist under A-Sketch's record label Astro Voice, before moving to Pony Canyon.

== Career ==
In 2009–2017, he was active as a Vocaloid producer under the name 21SeikiP (21世紀P).

In 2018, he landed his first main role as voice actor through television anime Wotakoi: Love Is Hard for Otaku. The following year, he received the 13th of Seiyuu Awards for best singing award along with other Hypnosis Mic cast. In 2021, he produced another Vocaloid song under his own name. The song titled "Magic Number" was specifically made for mobile rhythm game Hatsune Miku: Colorful Stage!, where he voices one of its main characters, Toya Aoyagi. Vocaloid producer Oster Project was involved with arrangement of the song.

On August 26, 2022, he made his solo singer debut under A-Sketch's Astro Voice label with his first single "Mayonaka no Love" (真夜中のラブ) release on September 21. In October 18, 2025 (his birthday), he announced that he has transferred to Pony Canyon and will release a new Ep under the label.

His special skills include playing guitar and drum. He is also a member of UMake with Yoshiki Nakajima, where he also serves as the composer.

He plays as several characters from music projects including: Hypnosis Mic (Doppo Kannonzaka), Hana-doll (Lihito Toudo), PRELUDERS (Chikage Misumi), and JAZZ-ON (Arata Kageyama).

== Notable works ==
=== Anime ===
- The Idolmaster SideM (2017) as Michio Hazama
  - Also in The IdolMaster Side M: Riyuu Atte Mini! (2018)
- Wotakoi: Love Is Hard for Otaku (2018) as Hirotaka Nifuji
- Otona nya Koi no Shikata ga Wakaranee! (2018) as Shuuji Majima (standard version)
- Fire in His Fingertips (2019, 2021) as Souma Mizuno (standard version)
- Show by Rock!! Mashumairesh!! (2020) as Yasu
- The Titan's Bride (2020) as Kōichi Mizuki
- Hypnosis Mic: Division Rap Battle: Rhyme Anima (2020, 2023) as Doppo Kannonzaka
- 2.43: Seiin High School Boys Volleyball Team (2021) as Shinichiro Oda
- Dragon Goes House-Hunting (2021) as Hero
- World Trigger Season 3 (2021) as Kazuto Tonо̄ka
- Life with an Ordinary Guy Who Reincarnated into a Total Fantasy Knockout (2022) as Hinata Tachibana (male)
- My Home Hero (2023) as Kyōichi Majima
- Oshi no Ko (2023) as Gorō Amemiya
- Mashle (2023) as Wirth Mádl
- Butareba: The Story of a Man Turned into a Pig (2023) as Nott
- Gods' Games We Play (2024) as Darks
- Twilight Out of Focus (2024) as Kirito Kujō
- I'll Become a Villainess Who Goes Down in History (2024) as Eric Hudson
- Promise of Wizard (2025) as Faust
- Classic Stars (2025) as Mozart
- Disney Twisted-Wonderland the Animation (2025) as Divus Crewel
- Hikuidori (2026) as Jinsuke
- The Other World's Books Depend on the Bean Counter (2026) as Seiichirō Kondō
- Recommendations from Iwamoto-senpai (2026) as Sōichirō Amaha
- Firefly Wedding (2026) as Kōtarō Ogawa
- Melody of the Boundary (TBA) as Kyōsuke Tsurumaki
- The One. Later On... (2027) as Wazu

=== Anime films ===
- Toku Touken Ranbu: Hanamaru ~Setsugetsuka~ (2022) as Kuwana Gou
- Colorful Stage! The Movie: A Miku Who Can't Sing (2025) as Toya Aoyagi

=== Video games ===
- The Idolmaster SideM (2017) as Michio Hazama
- Dragon Quest X: Ibara no Miko to Horobi no Kami Online (2019) as Yushka
- Promise of Wizard (2019) as Faust
- Hypnosis Microphone -Alternative Rap Battle- (2020) as Doppo Kannonzaka
- Disney Twisted-Wonderland (2020) as Divus Crewel
- Project Sekai: Colorful Stage! feat. Hatsune Miku (2021) as Toya Aoyagi
- Fate/Grand Order (2022) as James Moriarty (Ruler)
- NU: Carnival (2022) as Edmond
- Honkai: Star Rail (2023) as Dan Heng

=== Dubbing ===
==== Live-action ====
- Gossip Girl as Max Wolfe (Thomas Doherty)
- Twisters as Jeb (Daryl McCormack)

==== Animation ====
- Thomas & Friends: All Engines Go as James (Luke Marty)

== Discography ==
=== Cover album ===
Release date	Title
December 15, 2021	Cover ~Youth~

=== EPs ===
Release date	Title	Label
February 15, 2023	Hanabi (華灯)	Astro Voice
March 27, 2024	Sign (咲音)	Astro Voice
January 21, 2026	ShAdow	Pony Canyon

=== Digital singles ===
Release date	Song
September 21, 2022	"Mayonaka no Love" (真夜中のラブ)
