= Daisuke Sakuma =

Japanese singer, actor and streamer (born 1992)

- 佐久間 大介
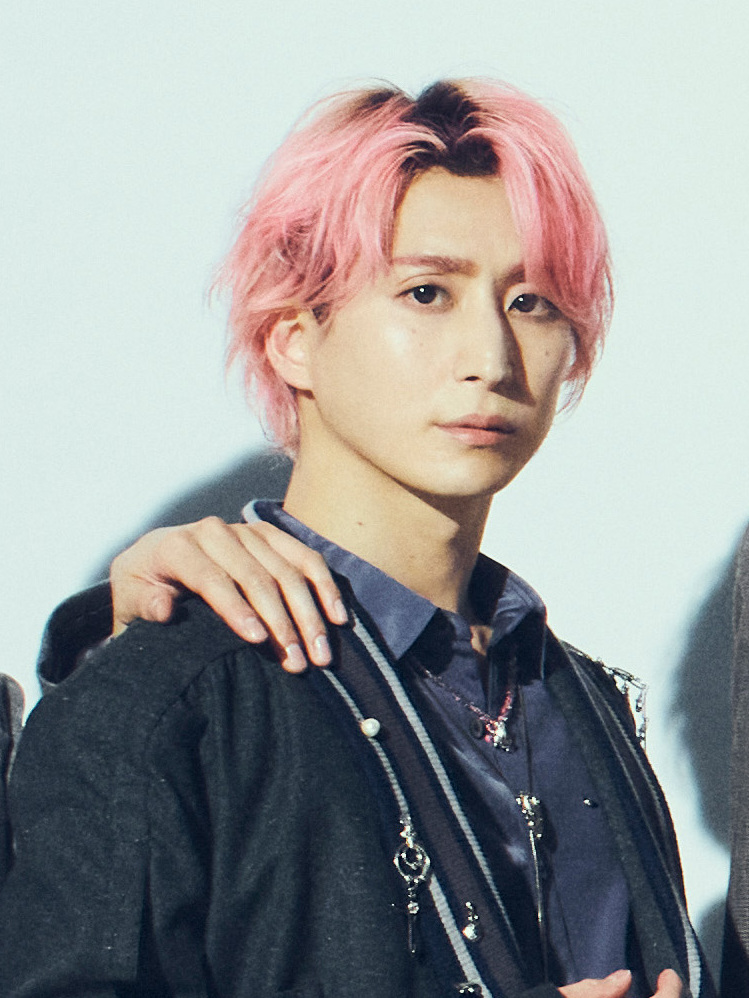
- Born: July 5, 1992 (age 34); Tokyo, Japan
- Education: Josai International University
- Occupations: Singer; actor; voice actor
- Years active: 2005–present
- Height: 168 cm (5 ft 6 in)
- Musical career
- Instrument: Vocals
- Labels: Starto Entertainment; MENT Entertainment
- Member of: Snow Man

Japanese name
- Kanji: 佐久間 大介
- Hiragana: さくま だいすけ
Transcriptions
- Romanization: Sakuma Daisuke

Daisuke Sakuma (Japanese: 佐久間 大介, Hepburn: Sakuma Daisuke; born July 5, 1992) is a Japanese idol, tarento, actor, and voice actor from Tokyo, Japan. He is known as a member of Snow Man, a group under Starto Entertainment.

== Career ==
Sakuma began his career after his mother sent his CV to the idol agency Johnny & Associates, for which he passed the audition in 2005. He was a member of Johnny's Junior group Mis Snow Man in 2009 that was then succeeded by Snow Man in 2012. Snow Man make its official debut in 2020. He made his debut as voice actor on the same year in anime Black Clover as Makusa North.

in 2026, Sakuma joined the voice cast of the Kill Blue anime adaptation, playing the role of Shin Kohazame, a pink-haired assassin.

== Personal life ==
Sakuma is the middle one of three siblings. His mother is Naomi Sakurai, who was a member of idol group CanCan. His father is the president of a family enterprise. Sakuma is frequently teased by his groupmates for being a "rich, spoiled brat".

Sakuma graduated from Josai International University in 2015.

Sakuma has been said to be "anime's biggest fan in Johnny's Junior" during his pre-debut days. He's also good at acrobatics and made his own "Acrobatic Wotagei" move. He is a vocal fan of the VTuber Hoshimachi Suisei and often praises her on television and on radio shows.

His trademark pink hair, which matches his member color in Snow Man, was revealed to have been chosen by him as a way to distinguish his group from all other idol groups.

== Notable works ==
=== Film ===
- Hot Snow (2011) - Sōji Doi
- Shiritsu Bakaleya Koukou (2012) - Sōta Mikuni
- Kamen Teacher (2014) - Student Council Vice President
- Last Hold! (2018) - Yoshito Kuwamoto
- Shonen-tachi (2019) - Maru
- Osomatsu-san (2022) - Jyushimatsu
- Matched (2024) - Tomu Nagayama
- Night Flower (2025) - Kai Ikeda
- The Specials (2026) - Daiya
- Matched: True Love (2026) - Tomu Nagayama

=== Television drama ===
- Piece (2012) - Kōji Maruo

=== Television programs ===
- Saku saku himu himu (2025, NTV Talk variety)

=== Anime (voice) ===
- Black Clover (2020) - Makusa North
- White Snake (2021) - Yang Tianxiang
- Cardfight!! Vanguard will+dress (2022) - Michiru Hazama
- You and Idol Pretty Cure (2025) - Hibiki Kaito
- High School! Kimengumi (2026) - Shō Kireide
- The Food Diary of Miss Maid (2026) - Chun
- Kill Blue (2026) - Shin Kohazame
- Inherit the Winds (2027) - Jinsuke Tachikawa
- Shōzen (2027) - Ryojin
- Just Like Mona Lisa (2027)
- Melody of the Boundary (TBA) - Kai Amano

=== Stage play ===
- Cash on Delivery (2018) - Norman
