= Naoko Yamada =

Japanese animation director

- 山田 尚子
- Born: November 28; Kyoto Prefecture, Japan
- Education: Kyoto University of the Arts
- Occupations: Animator; director; storyboard artist
- Years active: 2004–present
- Employers: Kyoto Animation (2004–2020); Science Saru (2021–present)

Naoko Yamada () (山田 尚子, Yamada Naoko) is a Japanese animator and director. Working at Kyoto Animation until 2020, she has directed the anime series K-On! (2009–2010) and Tamako Market (2013), and the anime films A Silent Voice (2016), Liz and the Blue Bird (2018) and The Colors Within (2024). In 2021, she directed the original net animation (ONA) The Heike Story under Science Saru. The series premiered on Japanese television in January 2022.

Yamada has won multiple awards for her work, and has received widespread renown for her stylistic choices in anime. She was also one of the youngest directors at Kyoto Animation, getting her first directing opportunity around 4 years after finishing university and starting work for the studio.

== Early life and education ==
Yamada was born in Kyoto Prefecture. She enjoyed drawing as a child and would copy images from the Patlabor and Dragon Ball series. Always showing an interest in film, Yamada would stay up late as a child just to catch whatever film might be playing in the evening slot. She showed interest in extracurricular activities as well, joining the volleyball club in primary school and the tennis and photography clubs in high school. At the Kyoto University of Art and Design, she studied oil painting and was a member of the special effects club.

== Career ==
Yamada originally intended to work in film after graduating from university, but she decided to join Kyoto Animation after seeing an advertisement the company had posted at her school. She first worked as an inbetweener for the very popular anime Inuyasha (2000-2004), which was outsourced to the studio at that time. She was eventually promoted as a key animator for a TV adaptation of Air (2005). From there she would work as the Key Animator on a number of other shows including The Melancholy of Haruhi Suzumiya, Kanon, and Lucky Star. She would then be mentored by one of the directors already working at Kyoto Animation, Tatsuya Ishihara. When asked about his initial thoughts on Yamada, Ishihara said "I thought she was a weird subculture girl who went to an arts university."

Her first directorial work was for the 17th episode of the anime series Clannad (2008), though it was K-On! (2009) that marks her chief directorial debut and the development of her unique style. The series would become successful, breaking numerous records and spurring another season in 2010 and a film in 2011, both directed by Yamada. In 2013, she directed Tamako Market, an original work which focused on the main characters' change from adolescence to adulthood. The following year, she directed its sequel film, Tamako Love Story, in which she won the New Face Award at the Japan Media Arts Festival. She storyboarded the entire film herself, and also wrote the lyrics for the opening theme song, Everybody Loves Somebody.

Yamada's next project was the feature film A Silent Voice (2016), an adaptation of the manga of the same name. Although it reflected on elements of bullying and physical impairment in Japan, Yamada did state that she did not want those to be the central focal point, but rather wanted the audience to focus on the more positive aspects of the film and use bullying as a means of showing Shoya's personality as a teen. The film opened at #2 in the Japanese Box Office and grossed a total of ¥2.3 billion, the 19th highest-grossing film in Japan in 2016. The film also received multiple award nominations, including Best Animation Film in the Mainichi Film Awards and the Excellent Animation of the Year in the Japan Academy Prize. A Silent Voice was re-released in North American theaters on October 12, 2022, for the film's fifth anniversary.

On July 18, 2019, a man started a fire at the main studio of Kyoto Animation, killing 36 of Yamada's colleagues and wounding 33 others. Yamada was reported not to have been hurt in the fire.

In 2020, Yamada departed from Kyoto Animation, and debuted with her first work outside of her home studio. Yamada started her work on the original net animation The Heike Story, at the anime studio Science Saru, which released its first episode in September 2021.

== Style and themes ==
For Yamada, the most important part of being a director is to observe people. She describes herself as a "method" director, emphasizing the minds of the characters. In an interview about her career at the UK premiere of "Liz and Blue Bird", Yamada states, "It's very important to me to treat the characters as individual people. I don't think of them as imaginary; instead I try to come in touch with them from their perspective." For example, she also stated that although she doesn't desire to either avoid LGBTQ+ themes or give them special treatment, she portrays them as a "natural course".

Yamada's work often features low-angle shots on the legs, a stylistic choice that sets her apart from many other anime directors. When asked about this choice, she explained, "When you're nervous, you move your legs around. I think that it would be nice to express emotion like that."

Yamada credits the majority of her style and themes to her love of live action film. Even though she decided to work in animation, much of her shot composition and use of space is heavily influenced by film styles found in live action work. Specifically, her use of low angle shots, shallow depth of field, and varying camera movement, allows Yamada's to pull in the audience stylistically just as any live action film would. When it comes to how Yamada thinks about her characters, she focuses heavily on styles of communication. Yamada also focuses a lot on the color composition in each shot of her works, by using specific tones she can better portray the emotions the characters are going through.

While much of Yamada's work has focused on female protagonists, her work on A Silent Voice features a male protagonist. This was a difficult direction for Yamada because she had said "I love girls, so I want to depict girls from here onwards. Depicting boys is difficult. For example, I thought a lot about what to do if boys who saw the film thought a guy wouldn't do something like that."

Yamada has been known to encourage her co-workers to have an enjoyable work environment, stating that "when I direct a title, I'm determined to do anything to make it great—so that everyone walks out of it thinking it was worthwhile, glad to have been involved."

== Filmography ==
=== Television ===
- Air (TV series) (key animator - 3 episodes, 2005) (in between animator - 2 episodes, 2005)
- The Melancholy Of Haruhi Suzumiya (key animator - 4 episodes, 2006)
- Kanon (key animator - 24 episodes, 2006)
- Lucky Star (animator - 6 episodes, 2007)
- Moribito: Guardian of the Spirit (background artist - 16 episodes, 2007)
- Clannad (TV series) (key animator - 27 episodes, 2008)
- K-On! (director, key animator - 14 episodes, 2009)
- K-On!! (director - 26 episodes, 2010)
- Nichijou (episode director, animator - 13 episodes, 2011)
- Tamako Market (2013)
- Free! (key animator - 12 episodes, 2013)
- Beyond the Boundary (key animator - 15 episodes, 2014)
- Sound! Euphonium (2015, series unit director; with Tatsuya Ishihara)
- Sound! Euphonium 2 (2016, series unit director; with Tatsuya Ishihara)
- Modern Love Tokyo (2022, episode 7)
- Jaadugar: A Witch in Mongolia (2026, chief director; with Abel Góngora)

=== Film ===
- K-On! The Movie (2011)
- Tamako Love Story (2014)
- Sound! Euphonium: The Movie – Welcome to the Kitauji High School Concert Band (2016, series unit director; with Tatsuya Ishihara)
- A Silent Voice (2016)
- Sound! Euphonium: The Movie – May the Melody Reach You! (2017, series unit director; with Tatsuya Ishihara (chief director) and Taichi Ogawa)
- Liz and the Blue Bird (2018)
- Sound! Euphonium: The Movie – Our Promise: A Brand New Day (2019, chief unit director; with Tatsuya Ishihara)
- The Colors Within (2024)

=== Original net animation ===
- The Heike Story (2021)

== Awards and nominations ==
Year	Organization	Category	Work	Result
2010	Tokyo Anime Awards	Notable Entry (TV Category)	K-On!	Winner
2011	Tokyo Anime Awards	Notable Entry (TV Category)	K-On!!	Winner
2014	The 18th Japan Media Arts Festival	Animation Award	Tamako Love Story	Winner, New Face Award
2016	Mainichi Film Awards	Best Animation Film	Liz and the Blue Bird	Nomination
2018	Sitges Film Festival	Animat's Award for Best Feature-Length Film	Liz and the Blue Bird	Nomination
2024	Shanghai International Film Festival	Best Animation Film	The Colors Within	Winner
