= Kakifly =

Japanese manga artist, best known for his manga K-on!

Kakifly (かきふらい, Kakifurai; born in Kyoto) is a Japanese manga artist. He is known for creating the series K-On! which was also adapted as an anime series by Kyoto Animation.

== Works ==
- K-On! (けいおん!) (2007, Houbunsha) (2010, English licensing Yen Press)
  - K-On! College (けいおん! College) (2011, Houbunsha)
  - K-On! Highschool (けいおん! Highschool) (2011, Houbunsha)
  - K-On! Shuffle (けいおん! Shuffle) (2018, Houbunsha)
- Kanamemo (end card illustration, ep 8) (2009)
- Yuyushiki (end card illustration, ep 8) (2013)
