= BS-TBS =

Japanese satellite broadcasting station

- Type: Free-to-air satellite television network
- Country: Japan
- Headquarters: Akasaka Gochome, Minato, Tokyo

Programming
- Language: Japanese
- Picture format: 1080i HDTV (downscaled to letterboxed 480i for the SD feed)

Ownership
- Owner: BS-TBS, Inc.
- Key people: Hideki Isanno (president and CEO)

History
- Launched: December 1, 2000; 25 years ago

Links
- Website: bs.tbs.co.jp

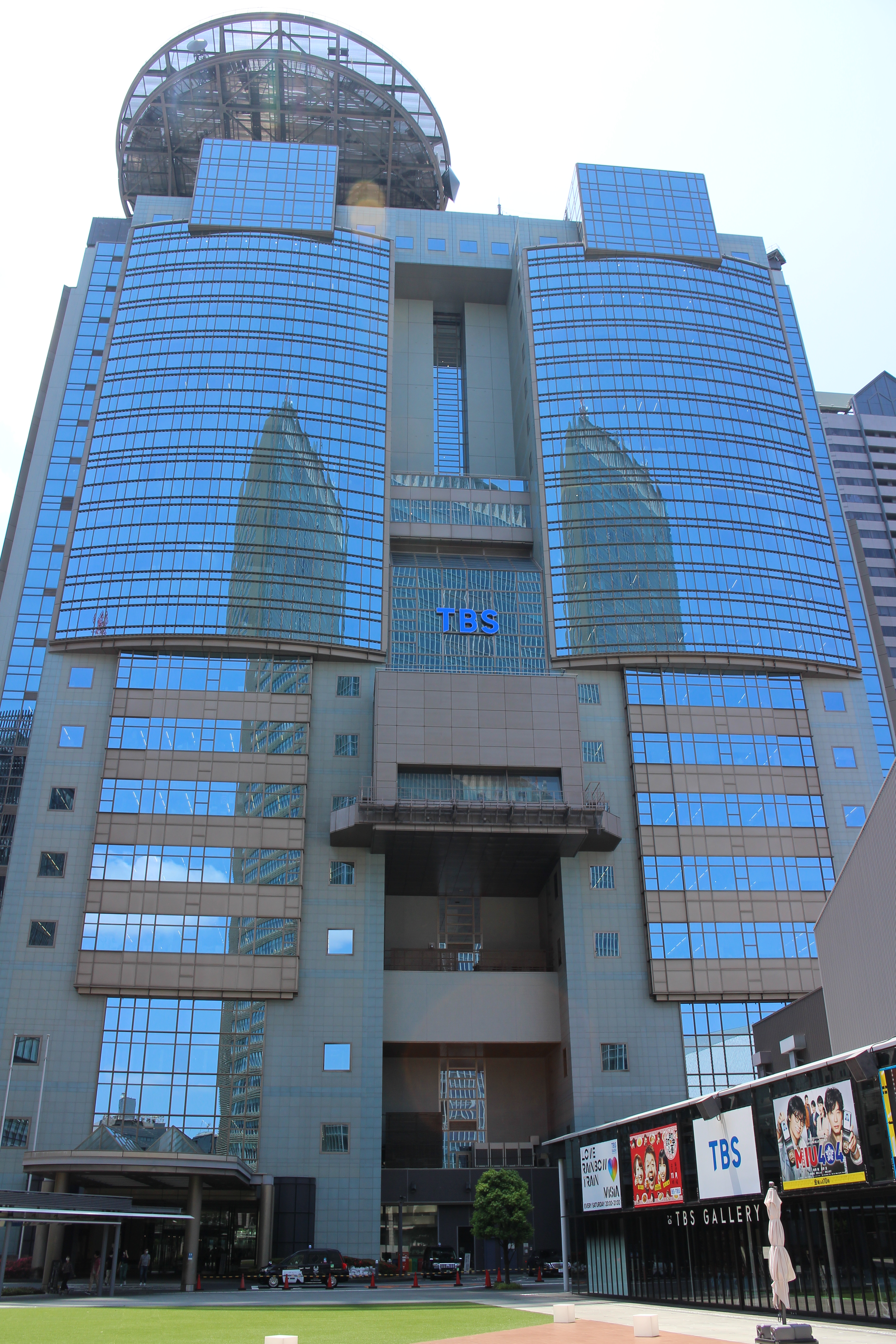
Headquarters of BS-TBS and TBS

BS-TBS, Inc. (株式会社ビーエス・ティービーエス, Kabushiki-Gaisha Bīesu-Tībīesu) is a Japanese satellite broadcasting station headquartered in Akasaka Gochome, Minato, Tokyo. Its channel name is BS-TBS (formerly, BS-i).

== History ==
BS-TBS logo from 2009 to 2020

- November, 1998: Japan Digital Communications, Incorporated (株式会社ジャパン・デジタル・コミュニケーションズ, Kabushiki-Gaisha Japan Dejitaru Komyunikēshonzu) founded.
- June, 2000: JDC was renamed BS-i, Incorporated (株式会社ビーエス・アイ, Kabushiki-Gaisha Bīesu-Ai).
- December 1, 2000: BS-i started broadcasting.
- July, 2003: BS-i moved its headquarters from TBS Hoso Kaikan to TBS Broadcast Center 15th fl.
- September 30, 2005: BS-i closed satellite radio broadcasting.
- April 1, 2009: BS-i, Incorporated was renamed to its current name BS-TBS, Incorporated.

== See also ==
- Tokyo Broadcasting System
- TBS Television
- TBS Radio
