= List of One episodes =

One: Kagayaku Kisetsu e DVD box set containing all four episodes released by JSDSS.

The One: Kagayaku Kisetsu e anime series, which encompasses two original video animation series produced by different studios, is based on the visual novel One: Kagayaku Kisetsu e by the Japanese software company Tactics, but have different stories and settings. The story from the first series follows a group of young high school girls who once knew a boy named Kōhei Orihara, but who eventually disappeared from each of the girls' lives. After he left, most of the girls forgot about him, but his childhood friend Mizuka Nagamori promised to never forget him. The story from the second series follows Kōhei Orihara, a male high school student, and the relationships that he forms with three girls from his school over a period of time. After forming a relationship, however, he finds that the girl starts to forget about him.

The first anime adaptation under the title One: Kagayaku Kisetsu e is produced by KSS, animated by Triple X, written and directed by Yōsei Morino, and features character design by Jun Satō who based the designs on Itaru Hinoue's original concept. Four episodes were produced which were released separately as OVAs on Region 2 DVDs between August 10, 2001, and May 24, 2002, by KSS. The series was re-released as a one-disc DVD box set on February 29, 2008, by JSDSS.

The second anime adaptation under the title One: True Stories (One 〜輝く季節へ〜 True Stories, One ~Kagayaku Kisetsu e~ True Stories) is produced by Cherry Lips, animated by Arms, directed by Kan Fukumoto, written by Tetsuya Ōishi, and once again features character design by Jun Satō who based the designs on Itaru Hinoue's original concept. Three episodes were produced which were also released separately as OVAs on Region 2 DVDs between November 21, 2003, and May 28, 2004, by Cherry Lips. Unlike the first anime adaptation, One: True Stories is an adult series. The three episodes of the second anime adaptation were licensed for North American distribution by Media Blasters. The episodes were released in a single DVD volume on August 16, 2005.

The first anime adaptation used five pieces of theme music, and the second used three. The opening theme for the first anime adaptation is "Eternity" sung by Millio; the first ending theme, used in episode one, is "Rose" by Sayuri Yoshida; the second ending theme, used in episode two, is "Impurity" by Haruhi Terada; the third ending theme, used in episode three, is "Kaze no Mieru Hi" by Machiko Toyoshima; the fourth ending theme, used in episode four, is "Kono Mama ga Ii yo" by Ayako Kawasumi. The opening theme for the second anime adaptation is "Kagayaku Kisetsu e" (輝く季節へ); the first ending theme, used in episodes one and two, is "Shōsetsu" (小説); the second ending theme, used in episode three, is "The Gentle Magic"; each song is sung by Rei Sakamoto.

== One: Kagayaku Kisetsu e ==
No.	Title	Original release date
1	"Rain Chapter Akane/Shiiko"; Transliteration: "Ame no Shō Akane/Shiiko" (Japanese: 雨の章 茜·詩子)	August 10, 2001
Akane Satomura is walking home from school one day with her friend Shiiko when she spots a young man she thinks she knows, though does not say anything to Shiiko. At school one day, she spots him again in the piano room, but once she gets there, finds that he is nowhere to be found. Another day while waiting in the vacant lot in the rain, the same young man appears and asks her if she is waiting for someone, but she runs off without saying anything. After meeting again a few more times, Akane eventually forgets about him.
2	"Wind Chapter Rumi/Mizuka"; Transliteration: "Kaze no Shō Rumi/Mizuka" (Japanese: 風の章 留美·瑞佳)	November 22, 2001
One day, Rumi Nanase seems to have a lot on her mind, which causes Mizuka Nagamori to ask her what is wrong. Rumi says it is nothing however. On the way home from school, Rumi remembers the first time that she saw Mizuka when she first came to town last year, which causes Mizuka to remember some of what happened back then regarding Kōhei Orihara. One day Rumi and Kōhei are at a summer festival, and at the end of the night, Kōhei disappears after a strong gust of wind. Soon after, Rumi goes to the same festival with Mizuka and it is revealed that Rumi has forgotten about Kōhei entirely.
3	"Snow Chapter Misaki/Mio"; Transliteration: "Yuki no Shō Misaki/Mio" (Japanese: 雪の章 みさき·澪)	February 22, 2002
After school, Mio is on the school roof drawing something and Misaki arrives on the roof and looks out toward the sunset despite being blind. Mio tries to converse with her via her notepad due to her being mute, but since Misaki cannot see, Misaki must resort to feeling Mio's lips as she voices the words. Kōhei, who Mio had met as a child, returns one day, and he and Mio begin to hang out. At the same time, Misaki meets Kōhei and they also hang out together in this time. Another day when it is snowing outside, Mio and Kōhei are walking together when Kōhei suddenly disappears as Mio is looking the other way. The rest of the year goes by with Mio seemingly having forgotten about Kōhei.
4	"Cherry Blossom Chapter Mizuka/Mayu"; Transliteration: "Sakura no Shō Mizuka/Mayu" (Japanese: 桜の章 瑞佳·繭)	May 24, 2002
While walking home from school, Mizuka spots a young girl from her school crying under a cherry blossom tree and goes to ask her what is wrong. She finds out that the girl, named Mayu, was crying because her beloved ferret Myu had died and she was still mourning her loss. Later, Kōhei is walking through parts of the town near the forest and lake, and passes by four of the girls that have already forgotten about him. Later, Mizuka remembers the past she had with Kōhei and the promise he made to one day return. Ultimately, Kōhei returns to Mizuka as he had promised.

== One: True Stories ==
No.	Title	Original release date
1	"Episode 1"	November 21, 2003
One day at school, Kōhei tries to get out of cleaning duty, and runs off to the roof where he meets a blind girl in a year ahead of him named Misaki Kawana. After some time, Christmas is coming up, and Kōhei tries to invite Misaki to a Christmas party he is going to, but Misaki initially tells him she already has plans. He later finds out that she lied because she was scared. Since Misaki feels that the school is the place she can be happiest, Kōhei and Misaki spend a night together at school and have sex. Another day, Kōhei discovers that she has no memory of him.
2	"Episode 2"	February 27, 2004
On a rainy day, Kōhei once again stops to talk with Akane Satomura in the vacant lot she is always standing in alone. He learns that she is waiting for her childhood friend who had disappeared some time ago, and she is still waiting for his return. Kōhei continuously tries to talk with Akane, but is shunned by Akane in the beginning. Another day, Kōhei is talking with Akane in the vacant lot when she suddenly collapses. He takes her to his home and lets her rest the rest of the day. Later at school, Kōhei asks her to go on a date with him, but she refuses him. Kōhei goes to the park to meet her and she eventually comes albeit late. Later that day, Kōhei and Akane go back to his home and have sex. Another day, Kōhei discovers that she too has no memory of him anymore, just like Misaki.
3	"Episode 3"	May 28, 2004
One morning after surprising Mizuka by sleeping under his bed, Kōhei suggests that he and Mizuka go on a date, and she agrees; they spend the rest of that day together having fun. The following week, Kōhei asks Mizuka to go out on another date, and she agrees, but after waiting at the park for a while, finds that she never shows. When it starts raining, he collapses and wakes up in his room with Mizuka next to him. One thing leads to another and they have sex. The next morning, Kōhei discovers that Mizuka has already forgotten about last night's events and thinks it is not long now before she completely forgets about him. In the end, she does not forget about him, though he disappears before her eyes. She tries to go back to her normal life after that, but always kept a hope that he would someday return. Eventually, Kōhei leaves the Eternal World and comes back to Mizuka.
