= Naoki Hisaya =

Japanese screenwriter

- Born: Naoki Hayashi
- Occupations: Author, Lyricist
- Writing career
- Genres: Fantasy, Fiction
- Notable works: Kanon; Sola; Sora no Method; Crystar

Naoki Hisaya (久弥 直樹, Hisaya Naoki), born Naoki Hayashi (林 直樹, Hayashi Naoki), is a Japanese screenwriter who has worked for Tactics, Key and Siesta, but as of 2006, he is a freelance writer. He is well known for being the main writer of the popular visual novel Kanon while working under Key. Additional works include Moon, One: Kagayaku Kisetsu e, and Moon Childe. He is also known for being the original concept writer for Sola and Sora no Method. He later wrote the scenario for the action role-playing game Crystar. He also does work in a dōjin circle named Cork Board.

== Career ==
Naoki Hisaya debuted as the main scenario writer for the adult visual novel developer Tactics under Nexton in 1997. He first worked on the company's second title Moon, followed by One: Kagayaku Kisetsu e in 1998. After One's completion, Hisaya and much of the staff who made both Moon and One, including Jun Maeda, Itaru Hinoue, Shinji Orito, and OdiakeS, left Tactics to work under the video game publishing company VisualArt's where they formed the company Key. At Key, Hisaya worked on the planning and most of the scenario for Kanon, released in 1999, but following the completion of Kanon, quit Key.

Afterwards, Hisaya formed the dōjin circle Cork Board and participated at Comiket and C Revo, another comic convention, between 1999 and 2002. He wrote 10 dōjinshi under Cork Board, some of which expand on the plots from Moon, One: Kagayaku Kisetsu e and Kanon: Four Rain (1999), First Snow (1999), One's Memory (1999), Seven Piece (2000), Innocent (2000), One's Memory Remake (2000), Kanon another story if (2000), Hinata (2001), Moon. anecdote (2002) and Seven Piece Remake "Piece II (2002). In 2003, Hisaya became involved with the dōjin circle "Black box" where he was put in charge of their first dōjin visual novel Limit Off. Hisaya was even able to write the lyrics for the game's theme song "Real intention", something he had never done before. However, even with anticipation mounting, in August 2003, the project was frozen and has never been restarted again.

In 2004, Hisaya started working for the video game company Siesta where he contributed as a sub-writer for their first title Moon Childe released in December 2005. Afterwards, Hisaya once again quit the company he was working for, but at Comiket 70 in August 2006, it was announced that he would now be working with illustrator Naru Nanao on a series entitled Sola as the main concept writer. When Sola was adapted into an anime in 2007, Hisaya was in charge of five out of fifteen episodes of the screenplay. He is also the author of the Sola manga series, illustrated by Chako Abeno. In 2012, Hisaya began collaborating with illustrator Mel Kishida to produce the novel-based project Sakura Kagura. The first Sakura Kagura novel was published on May 15, 2014 by Kodansha. He is the creator and writer of the original anime television series Sora no Method, and he is also the author of the Sora no Method manga series, illustrated by Yuka Namisaki. He wrote the scenario for the 2018 action role-playing game Crystar.
