= Moekan =

2003 video game

- Original visual novel cover for the Windows version of Moekan

モエかん
- Genre: Harem, Adventure, Romantic comedy, Mecha
- Video game
- Developer: KeroQ
- Publisher: KeroQ (Windows); PrincessSoft (DC, PS2)
- Genre: Eroge, Visual novel
- Platform: Windows, Dreamcast, PlayStation 2
- Released: JP: January 31, 2003 (Windows); JP: December 25, 2003 (DC); JP: February 5, 2004 (PS2)
- Novel

Moekan: Rinia Edition
- Written by: Midori Tateyama
- Published by: Ohzora Publishing
- Imprint: Heart Novels
- Published: October 2003
- Original video animation

Moekan The Animation
- Directed by: Kazukoto Ōno
- Produced by: Yasuo Kageyama; Teruhisa Yamaji
- Written by: Mayori Sekijima; Masashi Kubota
- Music by: Yasunori Iwasaki
- Studio: Axis; Noside
- Released: December 19, 2003 – July 23, 2004
- Runtime: 30 minutes each
- Episodes: 3
- Light novel

Moekan: Kinkyū Shirei! Imōtojima wo Kōryaku Seyo!
- Written by: Osamu Kudō
- Illustrated by: Motoyon
- Published by: Enterbrain
- Imprint: Famitsu Bunko
- Published: December 2003

Moekan (モエかん) is a Japanese adult visual novel developed by KeroQ. It was released for Windows on January 31, 2003, and later ported to the Dreamcast and PlayStation 2 platforms by PrincessSoft. The story follows Takahiro Kanzaki who is served by five android combat maids on Moekko Island. Moekan's gameplay follows a branching plot line which offers pre-determined scenarios with courses of interaction, and focuses on the appeal of the five female main characters by the player character.

A 3-episode original video animation (OVA) series was directed by Kazukoto Ohno, and produced by Axis and Noside. KSS distributed the anime in DVDs. Other media based on the game such as light novels, a manga anthology, drama CDs, soundtracks, and art books.

== Gameplay ==
Average gameplay and dialogue in Moekan, depicting the protagonist Takahiro conversing with Rinia.

Moekan is an erotic romance visual novel in which the player assumes the role of Takahiro Kanzaki. Much of its gameplay is spent reading the text that appears on the screen, which represents the story's narrative and dialogue. The text is accompanied by character sprites, which represent who Takahiro is talking to, over background art. Throughout the game, the player encounters CG artwork at certain points in the story, which take the place of the background art and character sprites. Moekan follows a branching plot line with multiple endings, and depending on the decisions that the player makes during the game, the plot will progress in a specific direction.

Throughout gameplay, the player is given multiple options to choose from, and text progression pauses at these points until a choice is made. Some decisions can lead the game to end prematurely and offer an alternative ending to the plot. To view all plot lines in their entirety, the player will have to replay the game multiple times and choose different choices to further the plot to an alternate direction. Throughout gameplay, there are scenes depicting Moekan and a given heroine having sex.

== Plot ==
Moekan is primarily set in a secluded place named Moekko Island, which is where android combat maids manufactured by AC Company are trained. The protagonist and owner of the island Takahiro Kanzaki lives in a mansion estate on the island and his job is to train these maids. One day, an early prototype robot called Rinia who has the appearance of a young girl is sent to the island for training. She does her best to impress Takahiro, who is convinced she will only cause trouble. However, her efforts and attitude tend to make an impact on those around her.

=== Main characters ===
Takahiro Kanzaki (神崎貴広, Kanzaki Takahiro)
Voiced by: Toshiyuki Morikawa (OVA)
Takahiro is the protagonist of Moekan. He is a very important figure, being the owner of Moekko Island. Takahiro trains android combat maids, one of them being Rinia, who he thinks comes across as troublesome.

Rinia (リニア)
Voiced by: Mia Naruse (PC, DC, PS2, OVA)
A hard-working and cute android combat maid who is an early prototype model. Rinia is kind-hearted and tries to impress the owner of Moekko Island: Takahiro.

Fuyuha Jissōji (実相寺冬葉, Jissōji Fuyuha)
Voiced by: Dynamite Ami (PC, DC, PS2, OVA)
An android combat maid that works in the library on Moekko Island. She has a laid-back and unfussy attitude, and likes to snooze.

Kazusa Asagiri (朝霧かずさ, Asagiri Kazusa)
Voiced by: Asumi Noda (PC, DC, PS2) / Kaori Fujisaki (OVA)
Kazusa is an android combat maid that came from the Audit Office's headquarters to monitor Takahiro. She is in charge of the cooking, which she is skilled at.

Kaori Kirishima (霧島香織, Kirishima Kaori)
Voiced by: Kanzaki Kanari (PC, DC, PS2, OVA)
Kaori manages the operation of Moekko Island. She likes stuffed animals and other cute things. Often she will end her sentences with "dechu".

Suzuki (鈴希, Suzuki)
Voiced by: Nagase Komiya (PC, DC, PS2, OVA)
A mysterious girl who wanders on the island night after night. She has a calm and taciturn personality. Suzuki's favorite dish is grilled octopus.

Moe no Mikoto (萌野命)
Voiced by: Haruko Momoi (DC, PS2)
She is the daughter of the executive of Moe, a purge unit Inspection Office Product Management Department. She is also an added heroine in the DC and PS2 versions of the game.

== Development and release ==
Moekan is KeroQ's third visual novel (not including Nijuubako, a fan disc of Nijuuei). The scenario was written by four people: Nekokichi, SCA-Ji, Shion, and Majika. Moekan's character designs were drawn by Motoyon, SCA-Ji, and Suzuri; they also worked as the main artists for the game.

The first press edition of Moekan was first released by KeroQ as two CDs for the PC compatible with Windows 98/ME/2000/XP on January 31, 2003. On the same day, a regular edition was released. An all-ages version of Moekan without any adult content was ported to the Dreamcast by PrincessSoft on December 25, 2003. A PlayStation 2 version without any adult content titled Moekan: Moekkojima e Youkoso (モエかん ～萌えっ娘島へようこそ～, lit. Moekan ~Welcome to Moekko Island~) was released in both limited and regular editions on February 5, 2004.

Two spin-off games were released at Comic Market based on Moekan. The first of these was Moeten (モエてん), which was sold on December 28, 2003 as two CDs. On June 11, 2004, another spin-off fan disc called Moekasu (モエカす) was released as one DVD containing two games, Moekan and Moetora (モエとら), a trading card game.

== Related media ==
=== Printed media ===
A 47-page art book titled Moekan First Fan Book was published by SoftBank Creative in December 2002. It contained an exclusive demo movie, illustrations, a drama CD, and pinups. SoftBank Creative also published the Moekan Visual Fan Book in May 2003, which contained 143 pages of character and story explanations, various drawings, interviews, a short comic, and more. A fan book for the PS2 port of the game titled Moekan ~Moekkojima e Youkoso~ Setting Commentary Fan Book was published by Jive in March 2004, containing 95 pages of visuals, commentaries, promotional images, and unpublished setting explanations.

A manga anthology drawn by various artists and titled Moekan Anthology Comic was published by Enterbrain under their Magi-Cu Comics imprint in September 2003. A 225-page novel based on the game titled Moekan: Rinia Edition was released by Ohzora Publishing under their Heart Novels imprint in October 2003. The story was written by Midori Tateyama. A 286-page light novel titled Moekan: Kinkyū Shirei! Imōtojima wo Kōryaku Seyo! written by Osamu Kudō and illustrated by Motoyon was published by Enterbrain under their Famitsu Bunko imprint.

=== Anime ===
A 3-episode original video animation (OVA) called Moekan The Animation directed by Kazukoto Ohno was produced by two animation studios: Axis and Noside. KSS distributed the anime as three region 2 DVD volumes between December 19, 2003 and July 23, 2004. The DVDs were released in both limited and normal editions. A DVD set was released by JSDSS on November 1, 2010 containing all three volumes.

=== Music and audio CDs ===
The opening theme to the game is "Bluebird in the Wind" (風の中の青い鳥, Kaze no Naka no Aoi Tori) and the ending theme is "Distant Words" (遠い言葉, Tōi Kotoba). Both songs are by Hiromi Satō. An original soundtrack for Moekan titled Moekan Original Soundtrack: Bluebird in the Wind was released by Scitron on March 19, 2003. Another album called Moekan Sound Content Kaze no Niji no Oto was released on September 28, 2003. An image song CD for Mikoto was released on February 5, 2004 along with the PS2 release.

Many drama CDs have also been produced. An audio drama called Moekan Drama CD Moeoto was released by Lantis on June 4, 2003, consisting of four tracks. On October 24, 2003, Kero Q and Minori collaborated on a drama CD for the release of OVAs for Moekan and Wind: A Breath of Heart. KSS released the drama CD at Comiket 64. A last drama CD titled Moekan Drama CD "Moekko Island Maid Diary" was adapted from the anime, and released on February 27, 2004.

== Reception ==
According to a national sales ranking of bishōjo games sold in Japan, the PC release of Moekan premiered at No. 2 during the latter half of January 2003. The game made another appearance in the charts during the beginning of February, and ranked as the 10th most sold game. Moekan made its last appearance in the charts during the latter half of February, and ranked No. 43 out of fifty other titles.
