= Moon (1997 visual novel) =

1997 Japanese adult visual novel

- Cover featuring main character Ikumi Amasawa
- Developer: Tactics
- Publishers: Tactics (Windows); AI System (Windows); Nexton (Windows, DVD); Regolith Innovation (Android)
- Artist: Itaru Hinoue
- Writers: Jun Maeda; Naoki Hisaya
- Composers: Shinji Orito; Jun Maeda; YET11; Ishisan
- Platforms: Microsoft Windows, DVD game, Android
- Release: November 21, 1997: Windows; JP: November 21, 1997; JP: August 21, 1998 (Renewal); JP: July 12, 2002 (Voiced) DVD game; JP: January 30, 2003 Android; JP: June 14, 2012
- Genres: Eroge; visual novel
- Mode: Single-player

Moon (stylized as MOON.) is a Japanese adult horror visual novel developed by Tactics, a brand of Nexton, released on November 21, 1997, playable on Windows PCs. The game was described by the development team as a "Reaching the Heart AVG" (心に届くAVG, Kokoro ni Todoku AVG). The story follows the protagonist Ikumi Amasawa, a teenage girl who joins a mysterious organization called Fargo in the hopes of discovering why and how her mother died, who was a member of the same group. The gameplay in Moon follows a branching plot line which offers predetermined scenarios with courses of interaction, and focuses on the three female main characters. The game ranked twice in the national top 50 for best-selling PC games sold in Japan.

Much of the staff that created the game later became the founding members of the visual novel brand Key. Moon was the starting point for Key's origins, and was the first time the principal Key team was formed. A novel based on the game written by Midori Tateyama was released in July 1998 by Movic. The game's original soundtrack was released bundled with Dōsei's soundtrack in August 2000 at Comiket 58; Dōsei was Tactics' first game. Moon has been referenced in other media not directly related to the game, such as in Tactics' third game One: Kagayaku Kisetsu e, and in the second anime adaptation of Key's first game Kanon.

== Plot ==
=== Setting and gameplay ===
Moon is set within a windowless facility owned and operated by the Fargo religious organization that aims to research what is referred to as the "unseen power". The Fargo facility shown in Moon is one of multiple facilities operated throughout Japan where new female believers looking to obtain the unseen power undergo "mental reinforcement" training. All men in the organization are either guards or researchers. New believers are split into three groups and segregated into three buildings for classes A, B and C which are linked together via an underground passageway. The accommodations and treatment of the trainees differ between the classes, with class A given preferential treatment, class B less so, and class C not given any of the comforts of the other two classes. This includes class C not having access to bathing, toilets, any kind of bedding or even private rooms. Classes B and C are also routinely raped by the Fargo men in the "tempering room".

Text in Moon is displayed in a dialog box, here depicting the player character talking with Haruka.

Outside of the living quarters, all believers have access to a dining hall, and are allowed to freely move within the confines of their own facility. Training of believers takes the form of repeated visits to both the Minmes and Elpod rooms which contain devices able to interface with the trainee's mind. The Minmes device fixates on a specific part of a trainee's past mental pain so as to measure their mental strengthening. The Elpod device makes trainees face a duplicate of themselves, forcing them to reminisce on past disgraces to again measure their mental strengthening. There is also a "relaxation room" that is occasionally used in place of Elpod training which contains a bed so the trainee can take a short nap. Other locations within the facility include a small sewer below the underground passageway, and two sets of three holding cells. Beyond the holding cells is access to an area 20 floors belowground with a room containing a vast field of flowers.

Moon is a horror visual novel in which the player assumes the role of Ikumi Amasawa. Much of its gameplay is spent on reading the story's narrative and dialogue. The text in the game is accompanied by character sprites, which represent who Ikumi is talking to, over background art. Throughout the game, the player encounters CG artwork at certain points in the story, which take the place of the background art and character sprites. When the game is completed at least once, a gallery of the viewed CGs and played background music becomes available on the game's title screen. There are scenes in Moon with CGs depicting a given heroine having sex. Moon follows a branching plot line with multiple endings, and depending on the decisions that the player makes during the game, the plot will progress in a specific direction. Throughout gameplay, the player is given multiple options to choose from, and text progression pauses at these points until a choice is made. Some decisions can lead the game to end prematurely, which offer an alternative ending to the plot.

To view all plot lines in their entirety, the player will have to replay the game multiple times and choose different choices to further the plot to an alternate direction. If not all conditions are met, the player is given an option to view a hint about which direction to take the plot, with seven hints in total. If all conditions are met, the player accesses the true conclusion to the plot. The player is also tasked to navigate the Fargo facility via the use of an overworld map of whichever part of the facility the player is currently in with the player's location indicated by a red circle. The game's story is divided into 20 days each with an English subtitle displayed mostly in white with a portion of it colored red. In the original game, a bonus role-playing game became available on the title screen after the game was completed at least once. This was later removed from the full-voice DVD edition of the game.

=== Story ===
Moon begins when high school girl Ikumi Amasawa (Note: Amasawa Ikumi (天沢郁未)) (voiced by: Ruru) arrives at the Fargo facility in search of the truth behind the death of her mother Miyoko (Note: (未夜子)) who was once a member of Fargo. There, she meets and forms an alliance with two teenage girls—Haruka Mima (Note: Mima Haruka (巳間晴香)) (voiced by: Aya) and Yui Nakura (Note: Nakura Yui (名倉由依)) (voiced by: Miya Serizono). Haruka is looking for her brother Ryōsuke who works as a Fargo researcher, and Yui is searching for her sister Yuri (voiced by: Komugi Nishida) who joined Fargo as a trainee. Ikumi is put in class A, Yui is put in class B, and Haruka is put in class C. Ikumi meets her roommate—an unnamed and mysterious young man referred to only as "Boy" (Note: Shōnen (少年)) (voiced by: Arashi Tsunami)—and also a young woman and fellow class A member Yōko Kanuma (Note: Kanuma Yōko (鹿沼葉子)) (voiced by: Satomi Kodama) who she interacts with when eating in the dining hall. Ikumi starts undergoing training and later meets up with Haruka and Yui on their third day at Fargo. They later locate Yuri in class C, but she refuses Yui's pleas to go back home with her. Yuri later loses control of the unseen power within her, but she faints when she sees Yui. The sisters are able to reconcile before the unseen power again goes out of control, killing Yuri in the process. Despite securing an escape route, Yui decides to stay to try to help other Fargo trainees. Ikumi and Haruka later locate Ryōsuke, who gives Ikumi a passcard to gain access to other parts of the facility, but this results in Ryōsuke being killed by Fargo's men. A few days later, Haruka—now under the influence of the unseen power—is ordered to kill Ikumi, but the power deserts her before she can do it, causing Haruka to go into hiding within the facility. However, Ikumi is then put in a holding cell, but she is freed by her roommate who is not human but an entirely different species first encountered 30 years prior.

Ikumi later finds the young man in a holding cell and learns that his species is the source of the unseen power. He also tells her that the purpose of Fargo was to find a way to implant that power within humans to create controllable super soldiers, and that his species has been held captive within Fargo's facilities. Ikumi tries to find a way to save him, but it is ultimately too late, and the young man is executed shortly afterward. Ikumi spends several days in deep depression, but when she uses the Minmes device, she receives encouragement from the young man who now only exists as a memory, allowing her to track down Fargo's founder, known only as the "voice's owner". Ikumi encounters this being in the form of a large red Moon, and a mental battle ensues with the founder and Ikumi using the unseen power. Ikumi prevails, resulting in the founder's death. At the same time, Yui finds Haruka in one part of the facility. Ikumi is then led to the dining hall by Yōko who tells her she has been ordered to kill her. Following a destructive battle, Yōko relents and saves both of them from dying. Yōko decides to leave Fargo and go back to the outside world with a promise to meet up with Ikumi at a later date. Ikumi uses the Minmes device one last time to have a conversation with her mother and say goodbye to her before also leaving the facility. Sometime later, Ikumi has given birth to her daughter Miyu, and she is still close friends with Haruka and Yui.

== Development and release ==
Moon's production was headed by YET11, the pseudonym of Tsutomu Yoshizawa. Planning for Moon was headed by Jun Maeda, who also worked on the game's scenario with fellow writer Naoki Hisaya. Art direction and character design was provided by Itaru Hinoue, while the computer graphics in the game was supplemented by Miracle Mikipon and Shinory. The game's soundtrack was primarily composed by Shinji Orito, with two tracks composed by YET11, and one track each composed by Maeda and Ishisan. Excluding YET11 and Ishisan, the staff that created the game later became the founding members of the visual novel brand Key.

Moon was first released on November 21, 1997, playable on a Windows PC as a CD-ROM. Nexton released Moon Renewal on August 21, 1998, with an improved game engine. AI System published the game under the title Moon Memorial Selection on September 14, 2000, for a cheaper price. Nexton released Moon DVD LimitedEdition on July 12, 2002, with added support for Windows 98/Me/2000/XP as a DVD-ROM; this release was also called Moon DVD Final Version by Nexton. The DVD edition, and subsequent releases, also included full voice acting, two animated sequences at the beginning of the game, and improved graphics. A CD-ROM version of the DVD edition titled Moon CD LimitedEdition was released on three CDs on September 20, 2002. Nexton released Moon DVDPG Edition in Japan on January 30, 2003, playable as a DVD game. Nexton later re-released the DVD edition with updated support for Windows XP/Vista/7 on April 2, 2010. Regolith Innovation released a version playable on Android devices through their Drops! service and app on June 14, 2012.

== Related media ==
A 256-page novel adaptation written by Midori Tateyama was released by Movic on July 31, 1998 (ISBN 4-89601-387-5). A 143-page art book including art from Moon and Tactics' later game One: Kagayaku Kisetsu e titled Tactics Moon & One: Kagayaku Kisetsu e Settei Genga-shū (タクティクスMOON.&ONE~輝く季節へ~設定原画集) was published by Compass on October 31, 1998 (ISBN 4-87763-014-7). The game's soundtrack was released bundled with the soundtrack for Dōsei, the game Tactics made before Moon, and was called Dōsei and Moon Original Soundtracks. The album contains a single CD and was released on August 10, 2000, at Comiket 58 by Exobitant Records. The disc contains 31 tracks; the first 15 pertain to Dōsei and the latter 16 are from Moon.

== Reception and legacy ==
According to a national ranking of how well bishōjo games sold nationally in Japan, the Moon DVD Windows release made the ranking of the top 50 games once at number 44 during the first two weeks of July 2002. Moon Limited also made it on the list only once, achieving the ranking of 48 in late September 2002. Ikumi Amasawa appeared in the Eternal Fighter Zero dōjin games by Twilight Frontier. Four characters from Moon can be seen as background characters during scenes in the cafeteria from One: Kagayaku Kisetsu e; the characters are: Ikumi, Yōko Kanuma, Haruka Mima, and Yui Nakura. There is a reference to Moon in the sixth episode of the Kyoto Animation version of Kanon, which can be seen as the film poster of a horror film that Ayu and Yuichi go to see. A limited edition framed art piece featuring a newly drawn illustration of the original cover art by Itaru Hinoue was available for sale in April 2022.
