= Key Net Radio =

Radio program

- Genre: Information
- Running time: 30–60 minutes (average)
- Country of origin: Japan
- Hosted by: Shinji Orito; Itaru Hinoue; Chiro
- Created by: Key, VisualArt's
- Original release: December 13, 2007 – August 30, 2010
- No. of episodes: 30
- Website: key.visualarts.gr.jp/gallery/radio/

Key Net Radio (Keyらじ, Key Raji) was a Japanese Internet radio program produced by VisualArt's and the visual novel studio Key, about Key and the games the brand produces. Thirty broadcasts were released online from December 13, 2007, to August 30, 2010. The show was hosted by Shinji Orito and Itaru Hinoue of Key, and another woman named Chiro who works for Pekoe, another visual novel studio under VisualArt's. Guests have been known to appear on the show including Jun Maeda and Na-Ga of Key. Each broadcast was recorded and were available via download on Key's official website after being edited by Orito, though Hinoue filled in for Orito on some occasions. The episodes were available for download on the radio show's official blog for the first nine broadcasts, and the first 27 episodes are no longer available for download. The more recent broadcasts could be listened to on VisualArt's' YouTube channel named Visual Channel. Listeners could submit thoughts about the show and any requests they may have for the show, along with submitting questions to the host trio. Key Net Radio's mascot is named Kirara and is drawn by Itaru Hinoue.

== Format ==
Key Net Radio was hosted by three people: Shinji Orito, a signature musical composer and co-founder of Key; Itaru Hinoue, a signature art director, character designer, and co-founder of Key; and another woman named Chiro from the visual novel studio Pekoe, also under VisualArt's. The greeting Key Raji wā (Keyらじわー) was used by the hosts to address the listeners, and was also used by the listeners as an opening greeting in submissions. For the first six episodes, the show had five corners, or parts, but from the seventh broadcast onwards two more corners were added to the program. When the show had five corners, each episode started with opening greetings from the hosts and went on to thoughts and impressions that listeners had about the show. This moved on to an informal talk between the hosts, followed by a section where entries previously submitted by listeners concerning their enthusiasm for Key were read by the hosts. The fourth corner concerned answering questions that had been submitted by listeners, and the final corner had Orito playing the flute; listeners could submit suggestions for songs he was to play. The first corner added concerns scary stories that the hosts can tell themselves, or read from submissions by listeners, and was added partly because Hinoue enjoys such stories. The second corner added deals with submissions by listeners describing a new fictional character, and Hinoue will take these submissions and form a new fictional character out of combining elements from multiple submissions together. During the broadcasts, tracks from the soundtracks released under Key Sounds Label play in the background.

== Broadcast history ==
=== 2007–2008 ===
The first broadcast was released on December 13, 2007, and was originally over an hour long, but was cut down to 30 minutes. The main topic of discussion of the first broadcast was Key's products at Comiket 73 held in late December 2007. The second broadcast was an end-of-the-year special released on December 28, 2007, and was longer than the first broadcast at 41:30 minutes. The third broadcast was a New Year Expansion edition released on January 22, 2008, and ran for 43:30 minutes. The fourth broadcast was released on February 25, 2008, covered the then-upcoming OTSU Vol. 2 album release as the main topic, and ran for 39:06 minutes. The fifth broadcast was released on March 19, 2008, and was so long that it was split it into two parts, the first at 38:12 minutes, and the second at 30:40 minutes. The main feature of the fifth broadcast was of having Na-Ga as a guest on the show.

The sixth broadcast was released on April 14, 2008, and ran for 41:26 minutes; this was also the first broadcast not edited by Shinji Orito, but instead was edited by Itaru Hinoue. The seventh broadcast was released on May 17, 2008, and ran for 42:03 minutes; this was the second broadcast edited by Hinoue. The main focus of the seventh broadcast was as a special listener contribution episode. The eighth broadcast was released on May 26, 2008, and ran for 48:37 minutes. The main focus of the eighth broadcast was as a report and discussion of the OTSU #02 and KSL Live World 2008 concerts held in May 2008. The ninth broadcast was released on June 19, 2008, and ran for 54:19 minutes. The main focus of the ninth broadcast was of having Lia as a guest on the show. The tenth broadcast was released on July 11, 2008, and ran for 49:50 minutes. The main focus of the tenth broadcast was of having Jun Maeda as a guest on the show along with giving a report on Little Busters! Ecstasy.

The 11th broadcast was released on August 8, 2008, and ran for 41 minutes. Since the previous two broadcasts had guests on the show, not much time was left to answer questions asked by listeners, so the 11th broadcast was a listener submission special. The 12th broadcast, released on September 19, 2008, ran for 59:20 and was recorded in a bar instead of the normal studio. The 13th broadcast was released on October 15, 2008, and ran for 53:51 minutes. The 13th broadcast focused mainly on information pertaining to Key's then-upcoming visual novel Rewrite, and featured Yūto Tonokawa, a scenario writer for Rewrite, as a guest on the show. The 14th broadcast was released on November 21, 2008, and ran for about 53:06 minutes. The 14th broadcast focused on the impending one-year anniversary of Key Net Radio in December 2008, and answered questions selected out of a lot. The 15th broadcast was released on December 24, 2008, and was released in two parts, the first at 69:04, and the second at 43:21 minutes. The first part focused on looking back and talking about the previous broadcasts, and the second part regarded the goods Key sold at Comiket 75 held in late December 2008.

=== 2009–2010 ===
The 16th broadcast was released on January 21, 2009, and ran for about 41:35 minutes. The broadcast focused on a report regarding Key's involvement at Comiket 75, and giving new information on Key's ten-year anniversary event Key 10th Memorial Fes later held between February 28 and March 1, 2009. The 17th broadcast was released on February 13, 2009, and ran for 28:30 minutes. The episode focused on the many goods to be sold at Key 10th Memorial Fes, and was the shortest broadcast. The 18th broadcast was released on March 19, 2009, and ran for 81:42 minutes. The episode was one of two recordings of the special broadcast Key Net Radio did at Key 10th Memorial Fes on February 28 and March 1, 2009. The 19th broadcast was released on April 9, 2009, and ran for 42:30 minutes. The 19th episode focused on the live broadcast Key Net Radio hosted in Osaka, Japan for two hours on May 6, 2009. The 20th episode was released on May 22, 2009, and ran for 54:03 minutes. The 20th broadcast reported on the live event held in Osaka.

The 21st broadcast was released on July 31, 2009, and ran for 39:30 minutes. The episode was described as a "regular broadcast" reporting on normal Key news and events. The 22nd episode was released on September 24, 2009, and ran for 41:42 minutes. The episode reported on the second VIP (Visual Information Party) event held by VisualArt's and Key on August 28, 2009; Shinji Orito did not participate in this broadcast. The 23rd broadcast was released on December 4, 2009, and ran for 34:40 minutes. This episode mainly focused on the goods Key would be selling at Comiket 77 held in late December 2009. The 24th episode was released on December 29, 2009, and ran for 50:40 minutes. This episode mainly dealt with an overview of the events in 2009 that Key participated in. The 25th broadcast was released on January 28, 2010, and ran for 37:30 minutes. The 25th episode focused on a restructuring of the corners on the show.

The 26th broadcast was released on February 26, 2010, and ran for 46:40 minutes. The episode was described as a "regular broadcast" reporting on normal Key news and events, though also introduced a new corner to the show. The 27th broadcast was released on March 24, 2010, and ran for 55:50 minutes. The episode focused on the Kud Wafter special event held by VisualArt's on April 3, 2010. The 28th broadcast was released on April 26, 2010, and ran for 33:50 minutes. The episode focused on the current state of Key Net Radio and possible changes the show would go through. The 29th episode was released on June 14, 2010, and ran for 1 hour, 1:10 minutes. The episode had the development staff of Kud Wafter on as guests and focused on the development of the game and answering questions from fans to the development staff. The 30th episode was released on August 30, 2010, and ran for 55:30 minutes. This episode was the last to be recorded and later distributed on Key's official website.

=== Other ===
An exclusive broadcast entitled Key Net Radio Push!! ver. was included with the August 2008 issue of Push!! sold on June 21, 2008. The main focus of the exclusive episode was of having the scenario writer Kai as a guest on the show. Kai has previously worked with Key on Clannad, though at the time his most recent work was Ram's visual novel 5. A two-CD compilation titled Key Net Radio Vol. 1 bearing the catalog numbers KSLC-0006—0007 containing the radio show's first 15 broadcasts plus an additional special episode was released at Key 10th Memorial Fes on February 28, 2009; it was released for general sale on July 29, 2011. A special radio broadcast was released on April 22, 2009, and ran for 9:50 minutes. The broadcast focused on news regarding the live broadcast held on May 6, 2009. Key Net Radio did another live broadcast on Ustream on May 13, 2010. A third live broadcast was held on Ustream on December 22, 2010. A CD compilation titled Key Net Radio Vol. 2 containing episodes 16 through 30 of the radio show and the show's theme song "World Link" sung by Kotoko was released on July 29, 2011.
