= Tateyama =

Tateyama may refer to:

== People with the surname ==
- Midori Tateyama, Japanese writer
- Shohei Tateyama (born 1981), Japanese baseball player
- Yoshinori Tateyama (born 1975), Japanese baseball player
- Homarefuji Yoshiyuki (born 1985), Japanese sumo wrestler now known as Tateyama Oyakata

== Places ==
- Mount Tate (立山), a mountain range in Toyama Prefecture, Japan
- Tateyama, Toyama (立山町), a town in Toyama Prefecture, Japan
- Tateyama, Chiba (館山市), a city in Chiba Prefecture, Japan
- Tateyama Domain, a feudal domain under the Tokugawa shogunate, in present-day Chiba Prefecture
