= Miya Serizono =

Japanese voice actress

Miya Serizono (芹園みや, Serizono Miya) is a Japanese voice actress specializing in voicing characters in adult video games.

== Voice roles ==
=== OVA ===
- G-Taste
- Imōto Jiro
- Magical Canan

=== Games ===
- A Profile
- After... - Kanami Shiomiya
- Ane, Chanto Shiyō Yō
- Ane to Boin
- Baldr Force EXE
- Blue
- Edelweiss - Sakura Takase
- Figyu @ Mate
- Galzoo Island
- Koihime Musō - Rinrin, Kayū
- Légion d'honneur
- Magical Canan
- Maple Colors
- Meguri, Hitohira
- Miageta Sora ni Ochite Iku
- Miko Miko Nurse
- One: Kagayaku Kisetsu e - Mayu Shiina
- Rui wa Tomo o Yobu
- Sensei da - Isuki
- Shamana Shamana: Tsuki to Kokoro to Taiyō no Mahō
- Sharin no Kuni, Himawari no Shōjo - Sachi Mitsuhiro
- Shin Koihime Musō - Rinrin, Kayū
- Sharin no Kuni, Yūkyū no Shōnenshōjo
- Sora no Iro, Mizu no Iro - Asa Mizushima
- Soul Link
- Tamamura
- Xross Scramble

=== Anime ===
- Koihime Musō - Rinrin, Kayū
- Shin Koihime Musō - Rinrin, Kayū
- Shin Koihime Musō: Otome Tairan - Rinrin, Kayū.
