= Itaru Hinoue =

Japanese artist

- Born: March 1 Osaka, Japan
- Education: Vocational school
- Known for: Visual novels
- Notable work: Kanon, Air, Clannad, Little Busters!, Rewrite

Itaru Hinoue (樋上 いたる, Hinoue Itaru; born March 1) is the pseudonym of a Japanese artist from Osaka, Japan, who is one of the founding members of the visual novel brand Key under VisualArt's. Hinoue's choice of her pseudonym stems from the manga C by Shō Kitagawa; the protagonist in the manga was named Itaru Amano (天野 格, Amano Itaru). Before forming Key, Hinoue worked for the company Tactics where she had a hand in the creation of the company's three games: Dōsei, Moon, and One: Kagayaku Kisetsu e. After forming Key, Hinoue has become known for her work on such titles as Kanon, Air and Clannad. Her dōjinshi circle is known as "Soldier Frog". In September 2016, Hinoue resigned from Key and VisualArt's.

== Career ==
Hinoue entered a vocational school to become a professional artist due to the influence of the popular adult visual novel Dōkyūsei by ELF. Her first work for a visual novel was as one of many artists for Tamago Ryōri by Bon Bin Pompon in 1996, but shortly after transferred to the software company Tactics under the publisher Nexton. There, she was the art director of three games: Dōsei, Moon, and One: Kagayaku Kisetsu e. After the completion of One, Hinoue and much of the staff who made both Moon and One, including Jun Maeda, Shinji Orito, Naoki Hisaya, and OdiakeS, left Tactics to work under the video game publishing company VisualArt's where they formed the company Key. At Key, Hinoue was the sole art director for their first three titles, Kanon, Air, and Clannad, but did not contribute for the two games that followed, Planetarian: The Reverie of a Little Planet, and Tomoyo After: It's a Wonderful Life.

For Key's games Little Busters!, Little Busters! Ecstasy and Kud Wafter, Hinoue shared the position of art director with fellow artist Na-Ga, though Na-Ga provided most of the art for the characters. Outside of Key in 2006, Hinoue was the art director for the yaoi visual novel Bokura wa Minna, Koi o suru by the company Pekoe, also under VisualArt's. In 2007, Hinoue provided uniform design and one of five character designs in a five-part moe adult drama CD series named School Heart's produced by Mana, a brand under VisualArt's. Between December 2007 and August 2010, Hinoue was one of three personalities (the others being Shinji Orito and another named woman from Pekoe named Chiro) on an Internet radio show sponsored by Key in regards to the brand called Key Net Radio. Hinoue worked on Key's ninth game Rewrite by heading the project's planning, and acting as the sole art director and character designer. Hinoue was also the sole art director and character designer for Key's games Rewrite Harvest festa! in 2012 and Harmonia in 2016, which was her last contribution with Key before resigning from VisualArt's in September 2016.

== Art style and reception ==
A self-portrait caricature of Itaru Hinoue

Itaru Hinoue has a distinct style of character art that evolved over the years, but there are still consistencies in her art style. Her characters have very small noses and mouths placed within close proximity of each other which leaves an abnormally large separation between the mouth and bottom of the chin. In contrast, she draws eyes relatively large and are widely spaced apart from each other. The limbs of her characters are depicted as long and narrow, along with possessing a long torso. These recurring characteristics of her art are referred to by her Japanese fans as "Itaru-e" (いたる絵; meaning "Itaru drawings"). She is skilled in preserving the psychological description of her characters via their facial expressions. Her style of drawing erotic content is also seen as being distinct. As seen with her art from 2006 onwards, such as in Little Busters!, much of her distinct style that she has become known for has generally either been omitted or improved upon.

Shortly before the release of Clannad, two autographed illustrations by Hinoue were put onto the Japanese Yahoo! Auction website in April 2004; bidding for the drawings started at 1 yen (about US$0.01). One of the drawings was bid on by forty-eight people was sold for 479,000 yen (about US$4,300), while the second drawing was bid on by 113 people and fetched 531,000 yen (about US$4,800). The latter item is the fifth most expensive item sold on Yahoo! Auction since April 2001, while the former is the twelfth most expensive.

Hinoue was one of several prominent artists who illustrated a pin-up for the manga Kannagi: Crazy Shrine Maidens. The pin-up, released in the third volume, was drawn in collaboration with the manga's author Eri Takenashi. Hinoue also provided a still image used in episode four of Kannagi's anime adaptation as the ending illustration.

An art book titled White Clover: Itaru Hinoue Art Works featuring illustrations by Hinoue was released on February 28, 2009 as a limited edition by Key at Key 10th Memorial Fes. The book was the single-most expensive item sold at the event, and contains over 170 illustrations of mainly heroines featured in Key's visual novels, but also contains other works by Hinoue such as One: Kagayaku Kisetsu e. Upon release, it was later discovered that there were some problems with some of the books, such as missing or out-of-order pages, or small dark specks on some of the illustrations. The art book was released for general sale on June 26, 2009 and features a different cover.
