= Invisible Guardian =

Invisible Guardian may refer to

- The Invisible Guardian, a 2017 Spanish film
- The Invisible Guardian (video game), a 2019 Chinese visual novel
