= Sola (manga) =

Japanese media franchise

- Sola manga volume 1 released in English by Broccoli Books featuring Matsuri (left) and Aono (right)
- Genre: Romance, supernatural
- Manga
- Written by: Naoki Hisaya
- Illustrated by: Chako Abeno
- Published by: MediaWorks
- English publisher: NA: Broccoli Books
- Magazine: Dengeki Daioh
- Original run: December 21, 2006 – February 21, 2008
- Volumes: 2
- Anime television series
- Directed by: Tomoki Kobayashi
- Produced by: Osamu Hosokawa; Shunji Inoue; Takayuki Nagatani; Tatsuya Ono; Tetsuro Satomi
- Written by: Jukki Hanada
- Music by: Hitoshi Fujima (Elements Garden)
- Studio: Nomad
- Licensed by: NA: Bandai Entertainment
- Original network: TV Aichi, Chiba TV, tvk, TVO, TV Saitama
- English network: NA: UTB
- Original run: April 7, 2007 – June 30, 2007
- Episodes: 13 + 2 OVA

Sola is a Japanese work originally conceived by Naoki Hisaya (main writer of Kanon) with original character design by Naru Nanao (designer of D.C.: Da Capo). It was first unveiled through the prologue of the manga featured in the Japanese manga magazine Dengeki Daioh on December 21, 2006, published by MediaWorks. The manga, which is illustrated by Chako Abeno, ended serialization on February 21, 2008. The manga has been licensed for distribution in North America by Broccoli Books with the first volume being released in June 2008. A short drama CD which also served as a prologue to the series was released at Comiket 71 in December 2006, and a second drama CD was released in May 2008. An anime version aired in Japan between April and June 2007; the anime contained thirteen episodes, and two additional DVD-exclusive episodes followed. The anime was licensed by Bandai Entertainment for distribution in North America in a subtitle-only box set of all fifteen episodes. The title, Sola, is close in pronunciation to the Japanese word sora (空; lit. 'sky'). At the end of 2007, Japanese anime fans voted Sola as the best anime of the year.

== Plot ==
Sola's story revolves around Yorito Morimiya, the main protagonist, who is a young boy attending high school. He loves taking pictures of the sky at any time of day and any time of the year. One day, Yorito decides to take a picture of the sunrise overlooking the bay, but is deterred when he meets a strange girl trying to force a vending machine that stole her money to give her what she tried to buy—a can of tomato juice. Yorito helps her with forcing the machine while attempting to strike up conversation with her, despite it being four in the morning. Yorito tells her why he is here, but by the time he has forced the can out of the machine, the girl has mysteriously vanished.

The next day, Yorito goes to visit his older sister Aono in the hospital with his friend Mana Ishizuki and Mana's little sister Koyori Ishizuki. Despite it being Aono's birthday, Yorito leaves soon after to take a photograph of the setting sun near an old church on the roof of the hospital. That night, Yorito leaves to buy groceries when it begins to rain and stops on the way home to wait for the rain to stop; while waiting, he runs into the strange girl he met from yesterday again. They talk longer this time and Yorito finally learns her name—Matsuri Shihou. A few days later, Yorito goes looking for the girl in the old church and finds a man wielding a sword before Matsuri.

After a display of Matsuri's astounding powers, Yorito discovers that she is in fact a creature known as a "Calamity of the Night" (夜の禍, Yoru no Wazawai), who has lived for centuries. She is being chased by Takeshi Tsujidou who intends to kill her, but Yorito tries to protect her by bringing her back to his home which is when Yorito asks her to stay with him for the time being.

A "Calamity of the Night", otherwise known as a Yaka (夜禍), is a supernatural being in the Sola universe. Yaka have many supernatural powers, such as: strong physical ability, fast regeneration, and never aging body, among other powers. A Yaka is hurt by direct exposure to sunlight, but the wound can be healed in time if the exposure is not excessive; a Yaka is immortal unless exposed to too much sunlight or has received fatal wounds. Matsuri explains that a Yaka is the embodiment of human agony and pain and that such creatures are meant to always be alone. Despite this, the two fall in love. As their relationship deepens, Matsuri reveals her long tragic past and her knowledge of Yorito's past.

== Characters ==
The main characters of Sola (from left to right): Koyori, Mana, Yorito, Matsuri, Aono, Mayuko, and Takeshi.

Yorito Morimiya (森宮依人, Morimiya Yorito)
Voiced by: Nobuhiko Okamoto
Yorito is the main protagonist of Sola. He enjoys taking photographs of the sky and will go out of his way to do so. He meets Matsuri Shihou early on in the story and finds out she is not human and is being chased by a man—Takeshi Tsujidou—who intends to kill her. Yorito tries to protect her by asking her to stay at his house. Over the course of the story, he and Matsuri fall in love. Yorito has an older sister named Aono who at the beginning of the story is in the hospital. Yorito visits her with Mana everyday and he brings her a new doll from a strange store that sells oddly designed dolls. Yorito is in fact a paper construct made by Aono, implanted with the memories of and designed after the image of the original Yorito, who died in the past. Yorito is impaled on a sword wielded by Aono as she tries to stab Matsuri, and "dies"; disappearing in a pile of paper.
Matsuri Shihou (四方茉莉, Shihō Matsuri)
Voiced by: Mamiko Noto
Matsuri is a strange girl Yorito meets early on in the story. She is a "Calamity of the Night" (夜の禍, Yoru no Wazawai), otherwise known as a Yaka, and has lived for hundreds of years. She cannot come in contact with direct sunlight as it harms her. Matsuri is fascinated by Yorito's photographs. Over the course of the story, she falls in love with Yorito. She has never seen a blue sky, only a deeply cloudy daytime sky or the nighttime sky. She has a particular fixed memory of seeing a moonlit sky from some sort of well or hole in the ground. Matsuri does not have much common sense and will often break machines in Yorito's house after kicking them too hard; she believes that any device can be fixed by kicking it. She has extreme fondness for tomato juice. Her ability is the power to make an object rapidly decay and transform those who have died into Yaka. Matsuri dies after stabbing herself with her sword, happy to finally see the beautiful azure sky she had always wanted to.
Aono Morimiya (森宮蒼乃, Morimiya Aono)
Voiced by: Mai Nakahara
Aono is Yorito's older sister who has been sickly ever since she was born and is hospitalized at the beginning of the story. She has a cold personality, showing very little emotion but still is visibly annoyed at Yorito for how much he seems to ignore her to do other things. Every time Yorito brings her a new doll, she takes one look at it and throws it in a nearby basket filled with other dolls. However, she does not hate them and even has one which is her favorite — the first one Yorito brought her. She enjoys making origami and is friends with Koyori. Aono is a Yaka—she was transformed into one by Matsuri when she tried to commit suicide after the Yorito from her time died in the avalanche that destroyed their house. Towards the end Matsuri kills herself so that Aono can become human again, freeing her from a world of darkness.
Mana Ishizuki (石月真名, Ishizuki Mana)
Voiced by: Yōko Honda
Mana is Yorito's friend from school; she often gets annoyed at Yorito for how he spends so much time taking photographs of the sky instead of spending more time with his sister. It is implied that Mana is in love with Yorito which is also picked up by her friends but she denies this. Mana works as a waitress at the Azur Restaurant and often comes over to Yorito's house to cook for him. She looks after her younger sister Koyori. She also knows about Matsuri's secret, and is heart-broken when Yorito would not tell her what he really was when he found out. She eventually takes up Yorito's hobby of taking pictures of clouds in the early morning, although she has no more memories of him after his death.
Koyori Ishizuki (石月こより, Ishizuki Koyori)
Voiced by: Ai Shimizu
Koyori is Mana's little sister who, at the beginning of the story, is staying in the same hospital as Aono, but is soon discharged. Whenever she calls Mana by her given name instead of referring to her as her big sister, Mana strikes her head. Koyori tries to keep Aono company whenever she can and they become good friends over the time Koyori spends in the hospital. Aono also teaches her how to make origami. Koyori is very polite to others even when not required to do so.
Takeshi Tsujidou (辻堂剛史, Tsujidō Takeshi)
Voiced by: Keiji Fujiwara
Takeshi is an older man who is trying to track down Matsuri. When fighting her, he wields a large sword unaffected by Yaka powers with the intention of killing Matsuri and uses ultraviolet rocket-flares to try to immobilize her. His intention to kill her is due to a promise to turn Mayuko back into a human. He was devoted to her when they were the same age: him as a young boy, and she was still alive. He promised to stay by her side until he can bring her back to normal.
Mayuko Kamikawa (神河繭子, Kamikawa Mayuko)
Voiced by: Tomoko Kaneda
Mayuko is a young girl with distinctive attire who follows Takeshi; she is also a Yaka. Whenever Takeshi finds her, it is at night when she is sleeping in a cardboard box which changes location around the city. Mayuko has a pompous personality and will not hesitate to talk bad of Takeshi around others, but she worries about Takeshi a lot. She became a Yaka many years before the story began when she was killed during a house robbery. Takeshi has been her support and companion since her death.
Sae Sakura (佐倉紗絵, Sakura Sae)
Voiced by: Ami Koshimizu
Sae is the most prominent of Mana's three friends and classmates. She works in the same restaurant as Mana and instantly was attracted to Takeshi when he first started coming to their restaurant due to his goatee. She also works at a convenience store. Sae loves to gossip and often talks to the point where she is ignored by her friends. She has wavy shoulder length hair and wears glasses. (The other two friends are Chisato, who has light brown hair and a fondness for Koyori, and Touko, who has long black hair.)

== Media ==
=== Manga ===
The manga version of Sola was first serialized in the Japanese shōnen manga magazine Dengeki Daioh, published by MediaWorks. On December 21, 2006, the prologue was published, and then the following month on January 20, 2007, the first chapter was serialized, which continued until February 21, 2008, when the final chapter was published. The story is adapted from Naoki Hisaya's original concept and illustrated by Chako Abeno. Two bound volumes were published under MediaWorks' Dengeki Comics label, the first on July 27, 2007, and the second on March 27, 2008. The manga was licensed for English language-distribution in the US by Broccoli Books; the first volume was released on June 18, 2008. The second volume was never released before Broccoli International USA was shut down.

=== Drama CDs ===
A short audio drama CD was released at Comiket 71 on December 31, 2006. The story consists of a prologue for the series that does not reveal much other than the personalities of the characters and a brief image of the setting. After the audio drama finished, an image song played entitled "Sensitive Scenery" by Ceui. This song was used as an insert song at the beginning of episode one of the anime, and then was used again in episode nine. Another drama CD based on the series was produced by Lantis and was set to be released on August 22, 2007, but it was delayed to an unspecified date and ultimately canceled for unknown reasons. Another drama CD, this time using the manga's story as a basis, was produced by Marine Entertainment and released on May 30, 2008; it was also supervised by Naoki Hisaya. The cast for the drama CDs is the same as with the anime version.

=== Internet radio shows ===
There have been two Internet radio shows for the Sola series. The first show, which used the anime adaptation as the basis, aired between February 2, 2007, and February 23, 2007, called Sky-blue Radio in Charradio (そらいろらじお in キャララジオ, Sorairo Rajio in Kyararajio), produced by Charradio. It aired every Friday hosted by either Mamiko Noto who played Matsuri Shihou in the anime, and Mai Nakahara who played Aono Morimiya in the anime depending on the week. There were two separate corners which were used to further promote the series and to update on any information regarding Sola. There were four episodes, and some time was set aside for the last two broadcasts to play the audio drama released at Comiket 71. There were two guests to the show: Yōko Honda in episode three who played Mana Ishizuki in the anime and Tomoko Kaneda in episode four who played Mayuko Kamigawa in the anime.

The second show, which again used the anime adaptation as the basis, aired between March 30, 2007, and July 27, 2007, called Sky-blue Radio (そらいろらじお, Sorairo Rajio), produced by Beat ☆ Net Radio! as well as Lantis Web Radio. It aired every Friday and had nineteen episodes hosted by different people depending on the month. The first broadcast, and the rest of April was hosted by Yōko Honda, and Ai Shimizu who played Koyori Ishizuki in the anime. The May broadcasts were hosted by Mamiko Noto and the June broadcasts were hosted by Mai Nakahara, though also featured appearances by both Noto and Honda. Finally, the July broadcasts were hosted by Keiji Fujiwara who played Takeshi Tsujido in the anime, and Nobuhiko Okamoto who played Yorito Morimiya in the anime. There were three corners named "Attack of Tomato Soup" (アタック・オブ・トマトしるこ, Atakku Obu Tomato Shiruko), "Sky-blue Letter" (そらいろの手紙, Sorairo no Tegami), and "Futsu Ota" (ふつおた). The show also had a series of guests that were other cast members from the anime series, but also included those who had previously hosted the show. These include Nobuhiko Okamoto who appeared in the second, ninth, and fourteenth episodes; Yōko Honda who appeared in the seventh, eighth, ninth, and eighteenth episodes; Tomoko Kaneda, who played Mayuko Kamikawa in the anime, appeared in the seventeenth episode; and Mamiko Noto and Mai Nakahara who appeared in the nineteenth episode.

=== Anime ===
An anime adaptation of Sola was produced by the animation studio Nomad and directed by Tomoki Kobayashi. The series aired in Japan on the TV Aichi television network between April 7, 2007, and June 30, 2007, containing thirteen episodes, though aired on other networks at the same time with slightly different start and end dates. The series was released in five DVD compilation volumes in limited and regular editions, each containing three episodes. The first DVD volume was released on June 22, 2007, followed by the second on July 27, 2007, and the third on August 24, 2007. Two additional episodes were made available exclusively on DVD volumes four and five; the first was released on September 25, 2007, and the second was on October 26, 2007. A poll was held in Japan by the company Spider Networks asking what was the best anime that aired in 2007. After two million votes were cast, Sola placed number one at approximately 340,000 votes.

The Japanese DVDs were also released by .Anime as a "special package edition" with different cover art released for the limited or regular edition volumes. The covers of the special package and limited edition volumes were illustrated by Naru Nanao, the original character designer for Sola; the covers of the regular edition volumes had illustrations of the anime-style art by Makoto Koga. Each of the regular edition DVDs contained an eight-page color booklet with illustrations from the series. The special package and limited edition DVDs also contained the color booklet, along with drama CDs containing tracks from the Internet radio show, and poster cards (the first volume also contained a poster card holder).

Bandai Visual licensed the Sola anime in early 2008 for release in North America, but it was delayed. After Bandai Visual USA folded into Bandai Entertainment, the Sola anime was planned to be released in a fifteen-episode subtitle-only box set, which was released on September 29, 2009. In May 2010, Section23 Films, distributor for Sentai Filmworks, announced that they would be re-releasing Sola, but this turned out to be a clerical error and the title was soon removed from Sentai's catalog.

==== Music ====
The opening theme to the anime, "Colorless Wind" by Aira Yuhki, was released in a maxi single by the same name on April 25, 2007, by Lantis; the opening theme was used for anime episodes two through thirteen. The ending theme, "Mellow Melody" by Ceui, was released in another maxi single also by the name of "Mellow Melody" on May 23, 2007, by Lantis; this ending theme was used for anime episodes one through twelve. The ending theme for the final episode is "Miageru Ano Sora de" by Aira Yuhki. "Mellow Melody" also included the song "Sensitive Scenery" (敏感な風景, Binkan na Fūkei) by Ceui which was used as an insert song in anime episodes one and nine and the second OVA episode. The Sola original soundtrack was released on June 27, 2007, and an image album, Oratorio, was released on August 8, 2007.
