= Dōsei =

1997 video game

- Cover featuring heroine Manami Minase
- Developer: Tactics
- Publishers: Tactics; Nexton; DMM
- Artist: Itaru Hinoue
- Writer: Don
- Composers: Shinji Orito; Ishisan; Myū; Paste
- Platform: Microsoft Windows
- Release: JP: May 23, 1997
- Genres: Eroge, social simulation game
- Mode: Single-player

Dōsei (同棲; lit. Cohabitation) is a Japanese adult social simulation game developed by Tactics, a brand of Nexton. It was released on May 23, 1997 for Windows PCs, the same day as To Heart by Leaf. The gameplay in Dōsei follows a branching plot line which offers pre-determined scenarios with courses of interaction, and focuses on the appeal of the sole female main character Manami Minase. The player assumes the role of protagonist Masaki Yamada who is living with Manami shortly after they have graduated from high school. Masaki earns money at a job, and when he returns home will have sex with Manami often; this process of work in the day, and sex at night repeats many times throughout gameplay.

Dōsei was re-released on September 14, 2000, with the title Dōsei Memorial Selection. The game's original soundtrack was released bundled with Moon's soundtrack in August 2000 at Comiket 58. Four of the staff that created the game—Itaru Hinoue, Shinji Orito, Miracle Mikipon, and Shinory—later became four of the founding members of the visual novel brand Key.

== Gameplay and plot ==
Text in Dōsei is displayed in a dialog box, here depicting the player character talking with Manami.

Dōsei is a romance social simulation game in which the player assumes the role of Masaki Yamada. Much of its gameplay is spent on reading the story's narrative and dialogue. Dōsei follows a branching plot line with multiple endings, and depending on the decisions that the player makes during the game, the plot will progress in a specific direction. Throughout gameplay, the player is given multiple options to choose from, and text progression pauses at these points until a choice is made. To view all plot lines in their entirety, the player will have to replay the game multiple times and choose different choices to further the plot to an alternate direction.

The story begins on Sunday September 14, 1997 with two main characters shortly after graduating high school who are living together. They are, the protagonist Masaki Yamada (山田 まさき, Yamada Masaki) and the heroine Manami Minase (皆瀬 まなみ, Minase Manami) who he is living with; both characters' names can be altered to anything the player chooses. There are two parameters related to Masaki and Manami which change depending on decisions the player makes during gameplay. Masaki's parameters are physical and emotional strength, and Manami's parameters are degrees of affection and lewdness. How much money the protagonist has from his job is also a factor in the game; the player starts out with 100,000 yen.

There are numerous scenes with sexual CGs depicting Masaki and Manami having sex. Typically, Masaki will come home from work and will have sex with Manami after a short conversation with her. This continuously repeats many times, causing much of the gameplay to occur during sex scenes. Depending on the choices, the protagonist may even become unfaithful to Manami which is when more sex scenes with five different women can be viewed. The player is occasionally given the opportunity to rest, but if Masaki rests too much then he will soon go bankrupt and the game will end.

== Development and release ==
Dōsei was Tactics's first game. Planning was headed by YET11, who also did programming, and Don, who wrote the scenario, though this person did not contribute in future Tactics titles. Art direction and character design was headed by Itaru Hinoue, and was the second time she had ever contributed in a visual novel. Hinoue also contributed with the computer graphics along with Miracle Mikipon, Shinory, and Suō Akiyama, and Mikipon also worked on the game's animation sequences. The music in the game was mainly composed by Shinji Orito who had at the time moved to Tactics after working under Leaf for three games. Hinoue, Orito, Mikipon, and Shinory later became four of the founding members of the visual novel company Key founded in 1998. Three others—Myū, Paste, and Ishisan—also helped with the music, but between them only composed one third of the game's soundtrack.

Dōsei was first released in Japan on May 23, 1997 as a CD-ROM playable on a Windows 95 PC. The release date was coincidentally the same day Leaf released their visual novel To Heart. Nexton, the publishing company Tactics is under, re-released an updated version of Dōsei compatible with Windows 95/98 on September 14, 2000 under the title Dōsei Memorial Collection. DMM released Dōsei Memorial Collection as a downloadable edition compatible with Windows XP on June 3, 2011.

== Related media ==
The game's soundtrack was released bundled with the soundtrack for Moon, the game Tactics made after Dōsei, and was called Dōsei and Moon Original Soundtracks. The album contains a single CD and was released on August 10, 2000 at Comiket 58 by Exobitant Records. The disc contains 31 tracks; the first 15 pertain to Dōsei and the latter 16 are from Moon. A collection of trading cards featuring art from Dōsei and Moon were also released.
