= Crystar =

2018 video game

- Developer: Gemdrops
- Publishers: JP: FuRyu; WW: Spike Chunsoft (Note: PlayStation 4 physical versions published by Numskull Games in Europe); WW: NIS America (Switch)
- Director: Fuyuki Hayashi
- Producer: Fuyuki Hayashi
- Artist: Riuichi
- Writer: Naoki Hisaya
- Composer: Sakuzyo
- Platforms: PlayStation 4; Windows; Nintendo Switch; PlayStation 5
- Release: PlayStation 4: JP: October 18, 2018; NA: August 27, 2019; EU: August 30, 2019; Windows: WW: August 27, 2019; Nintendo Switch: JP: February 24, 2022; NA: March 29, 2022; EU: April 1, 2022; PlayStation 5: WW: December 4, 2024; JP: February 27, 2025
- Genre: Action role-playing
- Mode: Single-player

Crystar (Note: Crystar (クライスタ, Kuraisuta)) is an action role-playing game developed by Gemdrops and published by FuRyu. The game was released for PlayStation 4 in October 2018 in Japan, and internationally by Spike Chunsoft in August 2019 with an additional Windows version. A port for the Nintendo Switch was released in Japan in February 2022, and worldwide by NIS America later that year. A version for PlayStation 5 was released in December 2024 internationally and in February 2025 in Japan.

== Gameplay ==
The player controls a girl named Rei Hatada, who makes a deal with twin demons of Purgatory, and the story progresses as the player fights the souls that drift about Purgatory. The concept of the game revolves around crying, which purifies new equipment to use. By defeating specific enemies, "Memoirs of the Dead", final thoughts of the dead, will appear, and crying will purify those thoughts and develop the protagonist mentally.

Outside of battle and dungeon exploration, the player can also return to Rei's room in the real-world part of the game and prepare for battle, view collectibles, pet her dog, and to enjoy everyday life through various angles.

== Development ==
The title of the game, Crystar, is a portmanteau of "cry" and "star". The idea came the producer Fuyuki Hayashi, who wants to replicate the feelings where one can draw shining things (akin to a 'star') in a sad event that also makes one 'cry'.

The base story is written by Naoki Hisaya, formerly of Key, known as one of Kanon's scenario writers.

The opening and ending theme songs, "can cry" and "re-live" (respectively), are both composed and sung by Nagi Yanagi, and the opening cinematic was directed by Tatsuya Oishi at animation studio Shaft.

== Release ==
The game was announced in the Japanese magazine V Jump, revealing the key staff and release date of October 18, 2018. A teaser trailer featuring the opening animation and gameplay was uploaded to YouTube in June. Pre-order bonuses for the game included an extra in-game costume, special soundtrack CD and a replica film sheet of the opening animation.

Spike Chunsoft released the game in English for Microsoft Windows and for PlayStation 4 in North America on August 27, 2019, and for PlayStation 4 in Europe on August 30. Arc System Works released the game in traditional Chinese in early 2019. A Nintendo Switch version of the game was released in Japan on February 24, 2022, and worldwide of the same year. A port for PlayStation 5 is scheduled to release on February 27, 2025.

== Reception ==
Reception

Aggregate scores
Aggregator	Score
Metacritic	PS4: 67/100; NS: 66/100
OpenCritic	38% recommend

Review scores
Publication	Score
Famitsu	30/40
Hardcore Gamer	3.5/5
Nintendo World Report	6.5/10
RPGamer	3.0/5
RPGFan	50%
TouchArcade	3/5

Crystar received "mixed or average" reviews according to the review aggregation website Metacritic. Fellow review aggregator OpenCritic assessed that the game received fair approval, being recommended by 38% of critics. Japanese magazine Famitsu rated the game 30/40 (8/8/7/7).

Crystar debuted at No.5 on the Media Create chart during the opening week in Japan, selling 10,473 retail copies. The Nintendo Switch version debuted at No.24 on the opening week, selling 2,842 copies.

Lucas White of PlayStation LifeStyle gave the game a 8/10, praising the story elements which tackles mental health in a realistic way, as well as the visual style which complements the story, but noted the low depth of the combat system, as well as the poor equipment system, which detracts from his experience. Lucas Rivarola of RPG Site rated the game 5/10, praising the setting and art style, but was let down by the limited animation, poor execution of the themes, and long dungeons which drags out towards the end of the game.
