= Digital Games Research Association =

Learned society for game studies

- Formation: 2003
- Type: Non profit
- Headquarters: Finland
- President: Ashley Guajardo
- Website: www.digra.org

Digital Games Research Association (DiGRA) is a nonprofit international learned society whose work focuses on game studies and associated activities. DiGRA was formally established in 2003 in Finland. It is a leading academic organization in the field of digital games.

Frans Mäyrä was the founding president from 2003 to 2006. DiGRA aims to coordinate activities related to academic research of games in different disciplines and in different parts of the world. For this purpose, several local chapters and special interest groups (SIGs) have been set up within DiGRA. Together with local organisers, DiGRA has so far produced eight conferences. DiGRA has also supported smaller regional conferences and, starting in 2014, DiGRA's conference is run annually. The published papers from these conferences are collected and made available online in the DiGRA digital library. Starting in 2013, DiGRA began publishing, in collaboration with Carnegie Mellon University's ETC Press, an open access refereed journal called Transactions of the Digital Games Research Association (ToDiGRA).

== Main activities ==
=== DiGRA conferences ===
One of DiGRA's primary activities is the organization of its yearly conference. The conference is not conceived as a significant revenue stream for the organization, but rather as a mechanism for encouraging and disseminating interest and scholarship in game studies. While the organization's board determines where the conference will be held each year, it is the result of a process that begins with an open "Call for Hosts". The final decision on who the conference host will be is based on a combination of factors. The primary ones include: how well-known, respected, and trusted the local organizers are; how much support the local team can count on; where the last conference was held (ideally it should move around different continents to allow a broader diversity of attendees); ease of access to the venue/location; and the expected expense of the conference to attendees.

To date, DiGRA has hosted, in collaboration with local organizers, the following conferences:

- DiGRA 2003 – "Level Up", November 4–6, 2003, Utrecht, The Netherlands.
- DiGRA 2005 – "Changing Views – Worlds in Play", June 16–20, 2005, Vancouver, Canada.
- DiGRA 2007 – "Situated Play", September 24–28, 2007, Tokyo, Japan.
- DiGRA 2009 – "Breaking New Ground: Innovation in Games, Play, Practice and Theory", September 1–4, 2009, West London, UK.
- DiGRA Nordic 2010 – "Experiencing Games: Games, Play, and Players", August 16–17, Stockholm, Sweden.
- DiGRA 2011 – "Think, Design, Play", September 14–17, 2011, Hilversum, The Netherlands.
- DiGRA Nordic 2012 – "Local and Global: Games in Culture and Society", June 6–8, 2012, Tampere, Finland.
- DiGRA 2013 – "DeFragging Game Studies", August 26–29, 2013, Atlanta, Georgia, USA.
- DiGRA Chinese 2014, April 19–20, Ningbo, China.
- DiGRA Nordic 2014, May 29–30, Visby (Gotland), Sweden.
- DiGRA Australia 2014 – "What is Game Studies in Australia?", June 17, Melbourne, Australia.
- DiGRA 2014 – "<Active Noun> the <Verb> of game <Plural Noun>", August 3–6, 2014, Snowbird, Utah.
- DiGRA 2015 – "Diversity of play: Games – Cultures – Identities", May 14–17, 2015, Lüneburg, Germany.
- DiGRA Australia 2015 – "Inclusivity in Australian Games and Games Studies", June 29–30, Sydney, Australia.
- DiGRA Chinese 2015 – "Program for Digital Games in China: Past, Present and Future", July 11–12, Beijing, China.
- DiGRA Chinese 2016 – “Decoding the Academic-Industrial-Gameplay Complex: Digital Game Practice, Research and Study in China, Taiwan and Chinese-Speaking Regions”, July 1–2, Taichung City, Taiwan.
- DiGRA and FDG 2016 – "First Joint International Conference", August 1–6, 2016, Dundee, UK
- DiGRA 2017 – July 3–6, 2017, Melbourne, Australia
- DiGRA 2018 – "The Game is the Message", July 25–28, 2018, Turin, Italy
- DiGRA 2019 – "Game, Play and the Emerging Ludo Mix", August 6–10, 2019, Kyoto, Japan
- DiGRA 2020 – "Play Everywhere", June 2–6, 2020, Tampere, Finland (cancelled due to pandemic)
- DiGRA 2021 – cancelled event, planned planned for April 13–18, 2021, Guadalajara, Mexico (moved first to October 25–29, 2021 and then to 2022, and due to pandemic; ultimately, Mexico editio was transferred to Poland)
- DiGRA 2022 – July 7-11, Kraków, Poland (previously planned to happen on April 25–29, 2022, Guadalajara, Mexico)
- DiGRA Nordic 2023 – "Interdisciplinary Embraces", April 27–28, 2023, Uppsala, Sweden
- DiGRA 2024 – “Playgrounds”, July 1–5, 2024, Guadalajara, Mexico
- DiGRA 2025 – “Games at the Crossroads”, June 30 – July 4, 2025, Valletta, Malta (scheduled)

The main DiGRA conference in 2016 was held jointly with Foundations of Digital Games (FDG), an annual conference organised by the Society for the Advancement of the Science of Digital Games (SASDG). FDG emerged in 2009 from the previous Microsoft Academic Days on Game Development in Computer Science Education (GDCSE), which started in 2006.

=== Publications ===
==== Digital Library ====
DiGRA archives and disseminates the proceedings of the various DiGRA conferences via its digital library. The DiGRA Digital Library is the full-text collection of all articles published in its conference proceedings as well as white papers. DiGRA uses an Open Access (OA) publishing model and authors retain copyright of their publications. DiGRA is granted non-exclusive publishing rights.

==== Transactions of Digital Games Research Association ====
In 2013 DiGRA launched the journal Transactions of Digital Games Research Association (ToDiGRA). The journal is refereed, open access, and dedicated to furthering the aims of the organization by disseminating "the wide variety of research within the game studies community combining, for example, humane science with sociology, technology with design, and empirics with theory". The journal does not accept unsolicited submissions, rather it publishes special issues that are usually dedicated, or drawn from DiGRA conferences. Selected papers form the conference are usually invited to the journal where they can be further elaborated on, and they undergo a round of peer review.

The Editor in Chief of the Journal is Professor José P. Zagal who is faculty at the University of Utah in USA. Dr. Zagal replaced the Journals first editor, Dr. Annika Waern from Uppsala University in Sweden.

=== Gamergate ===
In 2014, during the Gamergate controversy, DiGRA became the subject of a conspiracy theory promoted by Carl Benjamin, a YouTuber who claimed that it was being co-opted by feminists. Mia Consalvo, president of DiGRA at that time, said that the effort to discredit its members' research demonstrated "hostility to feminism" and a failure to understand academic research in humanities.

== Executive Board ==
DiGRA is managed by an elected executive board, since the first election for the 2003-2006 period (replacing the initial setup board).

=== Board Presidents ===
- Since 2024: Ashley Guajardo (USA)
- 2023 to 2024: Hanna Wirman (Denmark)
- 2016 to 2022: William Huber (UK)
- 2012 to 2016: Mia Consalvo (Canada)
- 2009 to 2012: Helen Kennedy (UK)
- 2006 to 2009: Tanya Krzywinska (UK)
- 2003 to 2006: Frans Mäyrä (Finland)
