= The Invisible Guardian (video game) =

2019 video game

- Steam banner
- Developer: New One Studio
- Producer: Guan Dan
- Release: January 23, 2019
- Genre: Visual novel

The Invisible Guardian (Chinese: 隐形守护者; lit. 'The Invisible Guardian') is a Chinese visual novel developed by New One Studio. It has a spy-themed story set during the Sino-Japanese War. The game has players follow a story and make choices that open up branching paths leading to a variety of different endings.

The game was released in 2019, and is distributed through Steam. The game is region-locked, and is only available for purchase within Mainland China, Taiwan and Hong Kong. It became the highest-selling title on Steam in 2019, and led to its producer, Guan Dan, to win a talent-cultivation program by the British Academy of Film and Television Arts in China. The Invisible Guardian also influenced other similarly styled Chinese games such as Underdog Detective.

== Plot ==
The Invisible Guardian features conflicts between spies against the backdrop of the Sino-Japanese War. In the game Xiao Tu, arrives in war-torn China from the Empire of Japan. He joins an underground resistance group, with the aim is to infiltrate Japanese-occupied Manchuria. Xiao Tu then meets a variety of characters with different allegiances and hidden motivations.

== Gameplay ==
The Invisible Guardian is set across mostly still images. This image depicts a choice that could lead to a branching path for the story in the game.

The Invisible Guardian has been described as both a visual novel and a full motion video game. In the Journal of Chinese Film Studies, academics said that the game has some minor animation effects, the game was primarily composed of text and still images and sometimes misidentified as an FMV game. Beyond still images, The Invisible Guardian features a variety of camera movements. In some scenes, images suddenly zoom in, zoom out, or pan, simulating the "push, pull, and pan" camera movements of traditional films.

As a visual novel, Invisible Guardian features a variety of branching paths that can lead to many different stories with different endings.

== Development ==
In 2015, a group of six people began experimenting with various forms of game formats. They cast students to act out their scripts. Among their projects was the visual novel The Secret Life of the Empress Dowager Cixi, which explored the life of Empress Dowager Cixi.

The game's producer was Guan Dan, a video game producer from New One Studio. In early 2017, she became the game's producer and started building her team. The developers immersed themselves in other contemporary games such as Heavy Rain (2010), which led them to the idea of a choose your own adventure-styled game with a spy fiction theme.

For the game, the costume designers, makeup artists, and props specialists researched and took educational courses during the shoot. The group used their own money outside their budget to pay professional music studios for the game.

== Release and legacy ==
The game was released on January 23, 2019. In January 2019, The Invisible Guardian was published on the Chinese, Hong Kong, and Taiwanese Steam service as well as the Chinese digital service WeGame. Zhao Erbadao writing in Jiemian News said that like previous Chinese titles like The Scroll of Taiwu (2018) Chinese Parents (2019), the game was a local hit. The game was the highest-selling title on Steam in 2019. The game is region locked.

Kamiab Ghorbanpour, writing for Rock Paper Shotgun complemented the game's recreation of historical settings, saying it was done in a "stunning fashion" while the highlight was the writing and interactive storyline used to grab the player's attention, saying that with its espionage theme, "every line has far reaching implications you might not see at first glance." Erbadao found its gameplay similar to a PowerPoint presentation and said that compared to other similar works Detroit: Become Human (2018) and Black Mirror: Bandersnatch (2018) the game was relatively rudimentary.

In October 2019, the British Academy of Film and Television Arts announced the first winners in its new talent-cultivation program in China. Among them was The Invisible Guardian's producer, Guan Dan.

Ding Liang said his experience playing The Invisible Guardian reminded him of playing other games, such as the Ace Attorney series. This led him to produce a title for his company in China that combined elements of both titles to create Underdog Detective (Chinese: 神都不良探), which featured the detective work of Ace Attorney with the branching storyline of The Invisible Guardian.

== See also ==
- Video games in China
