= One: Kagayaku Kisetsu e =

1998 Japanese adult visual novel

- Cover featuring heroine Mizuka Nagamori
- Developers: Tactics; Novamicus (Remake)
- Publishers: Tactics (Windows); KID (PS); AI System (Windows); Nexton (Windows); Kawamoto Industrial (FOMA); Magicseed (au, S3G); Regolith Innovation (Android); Ares Co., Ltd. & Novamicus & Shiravune (Remake)
- Artist: Itaru Hinoue
- Writers: Jun Maeda; Naoki Hisaya; Shinji Takabayashi (Note: Only for Natsuki Shimizu's route in the PlayStation port.)
- Composers: Shinji Orito; YET11; Ishisan; OdiakeS; M.S.
- Platforms: Microsoft Windows, PlayStation, FOMA, au, SoftBank 3G, Android, Nintendo Switch
- Release: May 29, 1998: Windows; JP: May 29, 1998; JP: January 24, 2003 (Voiced); WW: December 22, 2023 (Remake) PlayStation; JP: April 1, 1999 FOMA; JP: February 9, 2007 au; JP: March 1, 2007 SoftBank 3G; JP: July 2, 2007 Android; JP: June 14, 2012 Switch; WW: December 22, 2023 (Remake)
- Genres: Eroge (Note: All versions of the original release except the PlayStation port and the versions playable on au and SoftBank 3G mobile phones have adult content. The remake does not feature adult content in any of its versions.); visual novel
- Mode: Single-player

One: Kagayaku Kisetsu e (One ～輝く季節へ～; lit. One ~To the Radiant Season~) is a Japanese adult visual novel, developed by Tactics, a brand of Nexton, released on May 29, 1998 playable on Windows PCs. The erotic content was later removed when the game was ported to the PlayStation, which also contains an additional route. The story follows the life of Kōhei Orihara, a high school student who has fun spending time with several girls about his age, while at the same time he is gradually being drawn into a mystical alternate space known as the Eternal World.

The gameplay in One follows a branching plot line which offers pre-determined scenarios with courses of interaction, and focuses on the appeal of the six female main characters by the player character. The game ranked several times in the national top 50 for best-selling PC games sold in Japan. A sequel loosely based on One titled One 2: Eien no Yakusoku was produced by BaseSon, another brand under Nexton, and was released in April 2002. An enhanced remake, titled One., was released in December 2023 for Windows and the Nintendo Switch, and it is also available in English by Shiravune.

Much of the staff that created the game later became the founding members of the visual novel brand Key. KSS produced a four-episode all ages original video animation (OVA) series between 2001 and 2002 titled One: Kagayaku Kisetsu e. Cherry Lips produced a three-episode adult OVA series between 2003 and 2004 titled One: True Stories. One: True Stories was later licensed for English language distribution by Media Blasters. Comic anthologies and four novels were also published, as were audio dramas.

== Plot ==
=== Setting and gameplay ===
The main part One's story takes place at a Japanese high school, though little is shown except for Kōhei's classroom, the cafeteria, and a little of the surrounding area. The main school building is three-stories, and the roof is accessible, albeit with a sign on the roof's access door saying "No Entry", but the door is never locked regardless. Adjacent to the main building is another which houses club rooms. The school borders a forest on one side with a chain link fence. Beyond the forest is a park with a fountain and a flight of stairs on a hill. Other than the school, the shopping district in town and the usual path Kōhei takes to school are shown, but otherwise the only other place depicted is Kōhei's two-story house.

Text in One is displayed in a dialog box, here depicting the player character talking with Mizuka.

One is a romance visual novel in which the player assumes the role of Kōhei Orihara. Much of its gameplay is spent on reading the story's narrative and dialogue. One follows a branching plot line with multiple endings, and depending on the decisions that the player makes during the game, the plot will progress in a specific direction. There are six main plot lines that the player will have the chance to experience, one for each of the heroines in the story. Throughout gameplay, the player is given multiple options to choose from, and text progression pauses at these points until a choice is made. To view all plot lines in their entirety, the player will have to replay the game multiple times and choose different choices to further the plot to an alternate direction. In the adult versions of the game, there are scenes with sexual CGs depicting Kōhei and a given heroine having sex. Later, ports of the game were released without the erotic content.

=== Characters ===
Kōhei Orihara is a young man in high school living a normal life. He tends to tease the girls he knows, especially his childhood friend Mizuka Nagamori, but deep down he is generally nice to girls. Mizuka usually takes good care of him, and worries about Kōhei, wondering if he could suddenly get a girlfriend. She is constantly sighing, being made to go along with Kōhei's meaningless jokes. Kōhei meets a transfer student named Rumi Nanase early in the story whose goal is to become a "true maiden" and to that end, she behaves maidenly toward those around her, but she shows her true character just to Kōhei, who leaves a terrible first impression. Kōhei gets to know a quiet classmate named Akane Satomura who does not readily open her heart up to those around her, and refuses any help Kōhei may offer.

Kōhei also meets a blind upperclassman named Misaki Kawana who has a sociable personality where she can be unreserved with anyone. A mute underclassman girl named Mio Kōzuki meets Kōhei one day and uses a sketchbook to carry on written conversations. She belongs to the drama club, and despite not being able to speak, can still show emotion through various abundant expressions. The last girl Kōhei gets to know is a childish junior high school student named Mayu Shiina who refuses to go to school. Her one and only friend she could trust in life, a ferret named Myū, dies shortly before she meets Kōhei and the other main characters.

=== Story ===
The story revolves around Kōhei Orihara, the main protagonist. His father died when he was very young, followed by his younger sister Misao and finally his mother. Deeply depressed, he goes to live with his aunt Yukiko, his mother's younger sister, about ten years before One's story begins on November 30, 1998. After he meets Mizuka Nagamori as a child, Kōhei begins to seclude himself in the Eternal World, a world within his mind. The game's main recurring motif is a focus on the Eternal World, a mystical alternate space which is never clearly explained, and the details of which are unknown. Shun Hikami's remarks in the original game are possible clues about the Eternal World.

The Eternal World is a place similar to the afterlife where a person's "other self" awaits. Anyone can access it, though it is only accessible once one has lost his or her grounding in the real world. It may be necessary to form a pledge with someone in the real world as a guide to the Eternal World, but one's memories surrounding the pledge become vague. A grace period can be granted between when the pledge is made and when someone goes to the Eternal World. Once the process has started, nothing can prevent someone from going to the Eternal World, and returning to the real world is difficult. Someone about to leave to the Eternal World starts to be forgotten approximately one week before going, and the amount of time before someone forgets differs based on how much someone thinks about the person leaving. However, he or she is remembered the moment that person returns. If a strong emotional bond is established in the real world before leaving, a person in the Eternal World can be returned after approximately one year.

Kōhei is living a normal life in high school with Mizuka, and gets to know five other girls throughout the story who he helps with their various personal problems. While Kōhei likes to joke and tease these girls, deep down he is nice to girls and genuinely wants to help them. In the story, Kōhei is able to form intimate relationships with the six heroines: Mizuka Nagamori, Rumi Nanase, Misaki Kawana, Mio Kouzuki, Mayu Shiina, and Akane Satomura. While a given relationship will start out well, before long those around him start to forget him as he begins to retreat further into the Eternal World. If Kōhei forms a strong bond with one of the girls, she alone remembers him even after he leaves to the Eternal World. This ensures his eventual return one year later when he and the girl reunite.

== Development and release ==
One: Kagayaku Kisetsu e is Tactics' third title, after Moon and Dōsei. One's production was headed by YET11, the pseudonym of Tsutomu Yoshizawa, who also contributed to the music in the game. Planning was led by Jun Maeda, who worked on the scenario with fellow writer Naoki Hisaya. Maeda wrote the scenarios for Mizuka, Rumi and Mayu, while Hisaya wrote the routes for Misaki, Mio and Akane. Art direction was done by Itaru Hinoue who also worked on the computer graphics along with artists Miracle Mikipon and Shinory. In addition to YET11, the soundtrack was composed by Shinji Orito, OdiakeS, M.S. and Ishisan.

One was first released on May 29, 1998 in regular and limited edition versions playable on Windows PCs in CD-ROM format; the limited edition included the game's first original soundtrack. Both the limited and regular editions of the original game contained no voice acting. A promotional video for the game is still available for download at Tactics' One website. On April 1, 1999, KID released an all ages version in regular and limited editions playable on the PlayStation under the title Kagayaku Kisetsu e; the PS version contained full-voice acting and an additional route for a new heroine, Natsuki Shimizu, written by Shinji Takabayashi. On September 14, 2000, AI System released One: Kagayaku Kisetsu e Memorial Selection, which was essentially the original game, though the price was cheaper at a little less than half the original price. On January 1, 2003, a full voice version of the Windows game was released by Nexton. It has different voice actors from the PS version. Kōhei was not voiced in any of the versions.

Kawamoto Industrial released a version playable on FOMA mobile phones on February 9, 2007. Magicseed released two versions without adult content: one playable on au mobile phones on March 1, 2007, and the other playable on SoftBank 3G mobile phones on July 2, 2007. The final release by Nexton was on June 1, 2007 as a Windows Vista compatible edition for the PC. Gyutto released the full-voice, Vista-compatible edition of One as a downloadable version on February 26, 2010, and DMM also made it available as a downloadable version on June 15, 2010. Regolith Innovation released a version playable on Android devices through their Drops! service and app on June 14, 2012.

== Related media ==
- One: Kagayaku Kisetsu e

One ～輝く季節へ～
- Genre: Drama, fantasy, romance
- Novel series
- Written by: Midori Tateyama
- Published by: Movic
- Original run: August 31, 1998 – April 1, 2000
- Volumes: 4
- Original video animation
- Directed by: Yōsei Morino
- Produced by: Takatsugu Ōishi; Osamu Koshinaka; Saburō Ōmiya (1–2); Masao Nakamura (2–4)
- Written by: Yōsei Morino
- Music by: Torsten Rasch
- Studio: Triple X
- Released: August 10, 2001 – May 24, 2002
- Runtime: 30 minutes each
- Episodes: 4
- Original video animation

One: True Stories
- Directed by: Kan Fukumoto
- Produced by: Nabezō; Takatsugu Ōishi
- Written by: Tetsuya Ōishi
- Music by: Yoshirou Hara; Tomomi Nakamura
- Studio: Arms
- Licensed by: NA: Media Blasters
- Released: November 21, 2003 – May 28, 2004
- Runtime: 30 minutes each
- Episodes: 3

=== Print ===
Four adult novels based on the series, written by Midori Tateyama, were published by Movic between August 1998 and April 2000. Each volume focused on one of the main heroines in the story; volumes one through four focused on Mizuka, Akane, Misaki, and Rumi, respectively. A 143-page official fan book, which focused on Moon and One, was released by the publisher Compass in October 1998, titled Tactics Moon & One: Kagayaku Kisetsu e Creation Image Collection. ASCII released a 95-page official fan book for the PlayStation version of One in October 1999.

Compass also released a manga anthology called Tactics Anthology Comic One: Kagayaku Kisetsu e Chapter in May 1999. Movic released a two-volume manga anthology called One: Kagayaku Kisetsu e Comic Anthology between October and December 1999. Ohzora released five volumes of manga anthologies: three in one series, and the last two as stand-alone volumes. The three-volume series is titled One: Kagayaku Kisetsu e Anthology Comics and were released between May 2002 and February 2003. The first stand-alone volume called One: Kagayaku Kisetsu e Dōjin Selection was released in September 2003, and the second stand-alone volume titled Hidamari One: Kagayaku Kisetsu e was released in January 2004.

=== Anime ===
One was adapted twice into original video animation (OVA) series. The first was an all ages OVA titled One: Kagayaku Kisetsu e animated by Triple X and produced by KSS; four DVD volumes were released in Japan between August 10, 2001 and May 24, 2002. The all ages OVA is only loosely based on the original One visual novel and has a different setting. The second series, produced by Cherry Lips, was an adult OVA under the title One: True Stories, and adapted the visual novel much more closely. Three DVD volumes containing a single episode each were released between November 21, 2003 and May 28, 2004. One: True Stories was later licensed for English distribution by Media Blasters and the three episodes were released in a single volume on August 16, 2005.

=== Music and audio CDs ===
The visual novel's one main piece of theme music is the ending theme "Kagayaku Kisetsu e" (輝く季節へ) composed by Shinji Orito. Five of the heroines have background music leitmotifs, excluding Mayu Shiina. Mizuka Nagamori's theme is "Happiki no Neko" (8匹のネコ, Eight Cats); Rumi Nanase's theme is "Otome Kibō" (乙女希望, Maiden's Wish); Misaki Kawana's theme is "Mitame wa Ojō-sama" (見た目はお嬢様, Ladylike Appearance); Mio Kouzuki's theme is "Mujaki ni Egao" (無邪気に笑顔, Innocent Smile); lastly, Akane Satomura's theme is "Niji o Mita Shōkei" (虹をみた小径, Path of a Rainbow Sighting). The first original soundtrack for the game was released on December 6, 1998, and a second followed on September 24, 1999 as a piano arrange album. A remix album titled Sea Roars came bundled with the full voice Windows edition of the game released on January 1, 2003.

Three drama CDs based on the original game were released by Movic between November 6, 1999 and January 30, 2000. Two drama CDs based on the all ages OVA series were released by KSS between November 2001 and July 2002. A soundtrack for the all ages OVA series titled One: Kagayaku Kisetsu e Music from the Animation (also known as One: Kagayaku Kisetsu e Vocal Mini album) was released on August 10, 2001 by KSS. An original soundtrack for One: True Stories was released by ChamberRecords/Hobirecords on November 21, 2003.

== Reception ==
According to a national ranking of how well bishōjo games sold nationally in Japan, the One: Kagayaku Kisetsu e Memorial Selection Windows release ranked in on seven separate occasions. The game premiered at number six in the rankings during the first two weeks of September 2000. During the first two weeks of January 2001, the Memorial Selection ranked in at number 30, and a month later during the first two weeks of February 2001, ranked in at number 38. Memorial Selection ranked in again at 41 between the end of February and March 2001, and the following two weeks ranked in at 32. Memorial Selection ranked on the list again between May 7–20, 2001, ranking in at 47, and then for a final time during the first two weeks of July 2001, ranking in at 37. The One full-voice edition for Windows premiered at number 12 out of 50 in the ranking, and ranked the following two weeks at 40. In the month that followed, the One full voice edition ranked first in 60th place, and then again in the following ranking at 44. The PlayStation port in 1999 was reviewed by the Japanese video game magazine Famitsu, which gave it an overall score 27/40.

The all ages OVA series was given a negative review by Carlos Ross of THEM Anime Reviews. Despite looking "kinda cute", he criticized the characters as having "no personality beyond the standard cliches of [a] dating simulation." However, Ross did praise the art style, commenting that it was "rather nice, being in traditional analog style rather than CG." The One: True Stories adult OVA series was reviewed at Mania.com where the reviewer remarked, "One: True Stories is the perfect kind of entry level or couples type of show that focuses just as much on the story and emotions of the characters as the sex, if not more so." The characters were found to be "appealing", and the story is described as a "fantasy but it's a nice fantasy."

== Legacy ==
Type-Moon co-founder Kinoko Nasu credits the PlayStation port of One as inspiring him to be a video game scenario writer. After he read a Famitsu review of the PlayStation port (in issue No. 538, dated April 9, 1999) that urged readers who normally dislike "orthodox romance video games" to try playing it because of its "science fiction elements," Nasu bought the game and became enthralled by its in-depth story. That made him realize that he could write an interesting story in a video game format, leading him to start writing Tsukihime and distribute a free promotional version of the game at Comiket 56 in August 1999. Nasu also preferred how the text in the One PlayStation port is overlaid across the entire game screen, which was the format he used in Tsukihime, as opposed to the Windows version of One that has the text in a dialogue box on the lower portion of the screen. Illustrator and Type-Moon co-founder Takashi Takeuchi was already a fan of One at the time, but he preferred the Windows version. Nasu also said in a 2001 interview that the influence from One was so strong in his work at the time that even the manner in which the protagonist of Tsukihime talks is very similar to how Kōhei talks in One.

After the release of One: Kagayaku Kisetsu e, the game's producer YET11 was the only staff member who worked on the game who was later credited for future titles produced by Tactics, such as Tactics' next visual novel Suzu ga Utau Hi in 1999. The rest of the main production staff for One, along with its predecessor Moon, were later credited with the creation of the visual novel Kanon under the brand Key attached to Visual Arts. Characters from One have appeared in other media not directly based on the One series. The six heroines from One have appeared in the Eternal Fighter Zero dōjin games by Twilight Frontier. Additionally, Rumi Nanase can be seen as a background character in several episodes of the Kanon anime series by Kyoto Animation. Itaru Hinoue, the art director of One, included illustrations from One in her art book White Clover: Itaru Hinoue Art Works released in 2009.

A sequel loosely based on the One visual novel titled One 2: Eien no Yakusoku (One 2 ～永遠の約束～; lit. One 2 ~The Eternal Promise~) was produced by the visual novel studio BaseSon, another brand under Nexton. One 2 was released first on April 26, 2002, and then again on April 25, 2003 with added voice acting, scenario, CGs and music. One 2 used the concept of the Eternal World established in One as a major motif as One had done. The Eternal World in One 2 is better explained than in One, though the two versions of the world differ to a certain extent due to the scenario writers that worked on One not being credited on the production staff of One 2.

=== Remake ===
An enhanced remake, titled One., was announced in July 2022 for Windows and the Nintendo Switch to commemorate Nexton's 30th anniversary, with Itaru Hinoue returning as the main illustrator. It was released on December 22, 2023, with support in English and Chinese by Shiravune. The remake was developed by Novamicus, a brand of Nexton. Unlike the original, the remake does not feature adult content in any of its versions.
