= Mia Consalvo =

American professor of communication studies

Mia Consalvo (born 29 May 1969) is an American professor of Communication Studies presently at Concordia University in Montreal, Canada and holds the post of Canada Research Chair in Game Studies and Design, Communication Studies. Consalvo has authored a number of scholarly books and publications on the topic of video games in contemporary society and the culture of gameplay.

== Background ==
=== Education ===
Consalvo was born in 1969 in Biddeford, Maine. She received her BA in Communications from Lyndon State College in Vermont. She subsequently received her MA in Communications from the University of Washington, and her PhD in Mass Communications from the University of Iowa.

=== Activities ===
Consalvo held the post of president of the Digital Games Research Association (DiGRA) from 2012 to 2016. She previously held the post of president of the Association of Internet Researchers (AoIR) from 2009 to 2011.

Consalvo's research focus has included cheating in online games. According to her research, cheating for real world profit has been occurring for at least two decades, costing the video game industry millions of dollars. A common form of cheating involves the use of “bots” designed to automate certain game processes and gather materials valuable in a particular game, and selling these game materials to other players.

Consalvo's research has included a study on online gender swapping and demonstrated clear differences between online gaming behaviour among male and female players. According to Consalvo, males playing games using female avatars still display male patterns of movement. Additionally, these players act differently from actual female players in chat conversations.

Consalvo has also researched bullying of females, LGBT and minority players in games, pointing to the frequency of in-game bullying as an indicator of the state of online gaming culture.

On the topic of video games and violence, Consalvo found that sport-themed video games actually produced positive feelings among users.

== Books ==
- Atari to Zelda. Japan's Videogames in Global Contexts (2016). Mia Consalvo, MIT Press, Cambridge, MA.
- Players and Their Pets: Gaming Communities from Beta to Sunset (2015). Mia Consalvo & Jason Begy, University of Minnesota Press, Minneapolis, MN.
- Sports Videogames (2013). Mia Consalvo, Konstantin Mitgutsch & Abe Steins (Eds.), Routledge, New York.
- The Handbook of Internet Studies (2011). Mia Consalvo & Charles Ess (Eds.), Blackwell Publishing, Malden, MA.
- Cheating: Gaining Advantage in Videogames (2007). Mia Consalvo, MIT Press, Cambridge, MA.
- AoIR Internet Research Annual Volume 4 (2006). Mia Consalvo and Caroline Haythornthwaite (Eds.), Peter Lang, New York.
- AoIR Internet Research Annual Volume 3 (2005). Mia Consalvo and Kate O’Riordan (Eds.), Peter Lang, New York.
- AoIR Internet Research Annual Volume 2 (2005). Mia Consalvo and Matthew Allen (Eds.), Peter Lang, New York.
- AoIR Internet Research Annual Volume 1: Selected Papers From the Association of Internet Researchers Conferences 2000-2002 (2004). Mia Consalvo, Nancy Baym, Jeremy Hunsinger, Klaus Bruhn Jensen, John Logie, Monica Murero, & Leslie Regan Shade (Eds.), Peter Lang, New York.
- Women and Everyday Uses of the Internet: Agency and Identity (2002). Mia Consalvo and Susanna Paasonen (Eds.), Peter Lang, New York.
