= Midori Tateyama =

Japanese writer

Midori Tateyama (館山緑, Tateyama Midori; born on February 14) is a Japanese game scriptwriter and novelist from Aichi, Japan.

== Works ==
- Bakumatsu Renka Shinsen Gumi
- Meine Liebe II
- Memories Off 2nd
- Nasare Hina no Asa

=== Novelizations ===
- Moon
- One: Kagayaku Kisetsu e
- Tsui no Sora
