= Nexton =

Japanese software company

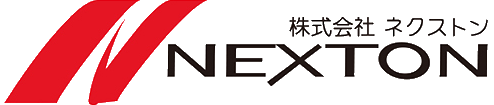
- Type: Kabushiki gaisha
- Industry: Computer games
- Founded: February 24, 1993; 33 years ago
- Headquarters: Osaka, Osaka, Japan
- Key people: Akihiko Suzuki (president)
- Products: Visual novels & Eroge
- Website: nexton-net.jp

Nexton Co., Ltd. (株式会社ネクストン, Kabushiki-gaisha Nekusuton) is a Japanese software publishing company specializing in the publishing and distribution of adult visual novels for 23 game development brands that Nexton is partners with. The company is located in Osaka, Japan. The current president, Akihiko Suzuki has served as the chief director of the Ethics Organization of Computer Software.

== Brands ==
- Azarashi Soft and its subsidiaries, Azarashi Soft+1 and Azarashi Soft Zero
- BaseSon and its subsidiaries, BaseSon SPICE* and BaseSon Light
- Cinematograph
- Galactica
- Herencia
- KarinProject
- Latte (Formerly Tactics*Latte)
- Liquid
- Lusterise
- Luxury (Formerly Tactics*Luxury) and its subsidiary Luxury Tiara
- M's TOY BOX:
  - Dark One!
  - GLASSES
  - RE:creation
  - Sky Rocket
- Mayfar Soft
- Nameless
- Novamicus
- Nomad
- Portion
- Pure-Liquid
- Score and its subsidiary Score [Shukoa!]
- Torte Soft
- Yumemiru (Co-owned by DiGination)

Former brands

- PL+US
- Psycho—produced Miko Miko Nurse
- Tactics
- RaSen (succeeded by Yukari, independent from Nexton)

== Tactics ==
Tactics was a brand of Nexton from 1997 to 2011. Their debut release was a game titled Dōsei in mid-1997, followed by Moon in the same year, and One: Kagayaku Kisetsu e in 1998. The last two games were met with much praise from the Japanese community. While the studio was still in its early years, the core team of both Moon and One broke off and began their own company, Key, in 1998. Tactics continued to release games despite this sudden change in staff. In 2009, Tactics became two separate brands: Tactics Luxury and Tactics*Latte. In 2011, the Tactics brand shut down and the two brands became independent.

- Games produced by Tactics
  - Dōsei (1997)
  - Moon (1997)
    - Moon Renewal (1998)
  - One: Kagayaku Kisetsu e (1998)
- Games produced as a part of Nexton
  - Suzu ga Utau Hi (1999)
  - Yūyake -November- (2000)
  - Variety Tactics (2000)
  - Sui Sui Sweet (2000)
  - Cheerio! (2001)
  - Kemono Gakuen (2001)
  - Flügel ~Yakusoku no Aozora no Shita e~ (2002)
  - Unicchi! ~Weenie Witches~ (2002)
  - Apocalypse ~Deus Ex Machina~ (2003)
  - Zaishuu -The SiN- (2004)
  - Tenshi no Himegoto (2005)
  - Harem Party (2006)
- Games produced by Tactics Luxury
  - As Tactics Luxury
    - Trouble@Vampire! ~Ano Ko wa Ore no Goshujinsama~ (2009)
  - As Luxury
    - Maou no Kuse ni Namaiki da! (2012)
    - Akuma de Oshioki! Marukido Sadoshiki Hentai Oshioki Kouza (2013)
    - Maou no Kuse ni Namaiki da! 2 ~Kondo wa Seisen da!~ (2013)
- Games produced by Tactics*Latte
  - As Tactics*Latte
    - Dakkoshite Gyu! ~Ore no Yome wa Dakimakura~ (2009)
  - As Latte
    - Imouto Senbatsu☆Sousenkyo (2011)
    - Dainikai Imouto Senbatsu☆Sousenkyo ~366ninme no Imouto Icha Love Nijitsudan~ (2012)
    - Koiseyo!! Imouto Banchou (2013)
