= Visual novel =

Narrative-focused video game genre

Visual novels (Note: Japanese: ビジュアルノベル, Hepburn: lit. Bijuaru noberu; visual novel) are a video game genre of Japanese origin focused on presenting a story. Progress is made via means such as clicking, tapping or pressing a button. Some descriptions of the genre suggest that they present the player with choices that branch the narrative. The aesthetics of visual novels are often conveyed through static images of characters, background art, with soundtracks and sound effects for feedback. Both the narrative and interactions in the games are commonly presented through text boxes and often employ forms of interaction which include menu-choices to control player actions or dialogue that represent the player's character speech or thoughts.

Visual novels draw gameplay elements from 1980s Japanese and Western-made adventure games. The term "visual novel" originated by the later-half of the 1990s, while in Japan they are often called noberugēmu (lit. 'novel game') for short. Releases in the 1990s such as Otogirisō (1992), Yu-no (1996), and Kanon (1999) would establish the gameplay and visual elements that would become common in later visual novels. Being narrative-focused, the stories and themes explored range from various narrative genres, with Japanese-made games often emphasizing romance. Visual novels are made with lower cost and in shorter periods of time compared to other game genres. This has led them to represent the majority of PC video games produced and sold in Japan. As they are easier to develop than other game genres, most Japanese erotic games were developed as visual novels due to their low-budget nature.

The genre grew more attention in the West with the belated release of games like Phoenix Wright: Ace Attorney (2001) in 2005. This coincided with the rising popularity of anime in the West in the 2000s, which led to players discovering visual novels from their anime adaptations, which led to Western developers developing visual novels more prominently in the 2010s. Through the release of free and open-source software such as Ren'Py, developers outside of Japan began developing more games that adapted visual and gameplay elements of visual novels such as the American Butterfly Soup (2017) and Chinese The Invisible Guardian (2019). Other Japanese games would adapt to newer technology such as virtual reality headsets or artificial intelligence in the second quarter of the 21st century.

The genre has historically maintained a strong presence in Japan's video game market and otaku culture with hundreds of titles produced yearly. In the Western world, there is debate whether the titles are games at all due to the limited interactivity. Publishers have said these debates had led to slower adaption to mainstream digital distributors such as Steam to release visual novels. In 2015, academic Mia Consalvo said that visual novels remained one of the most "Japanese" genres of video games, due to their use of Japanese tropes, themes and settings and described them as the least exported styles of games coming from Japan. Mark Kretzschmar and Sara Raffel, authors of The History and Allure of Interactive Visual Novels (2023) wrote that they expect the visual novel to remain at least a fringe level of popularity due to the changing tastes of Western game audiences. They described these audiences now finding the "Japanese-ness" of visual novels as being a "selling point, not a cultural obstacle".

== Etymology ==
The visual novel video game genre originated in Japan. The commonly used term for them in Japan is noberugēmu (lit. 'novel games', short for visual novel game). The expression "visual novel" emerged in the mid-1990s and has been applied retroactively in the Western world to a vast corpus of games.

Some games from the late 1980s promoted themselves as novel games first appeared in the Japan in the PC game market. The first of these was DOME which was released by System Sacom in 1988. The game was marketed as "Novelware" and released for the Japanese home computer market. Several other games marketed as "Novelware" were created by 1991, but have what Japanese video game historian Yuhsuke Koyama described as little impact on what would be later be known understood as a visual novel. The Japanese video game company Chunsoft used the registered trademark "Sound Novel" to describe their early 1990s games Otogirisō (1992) and Banshee's Last Cry (1994). The first commercial video game to be described as a visual novel was Shizuku (1996) which was created the Japanese company Leaf listing their game as being part of a similarly named "Visual Novel Series". The next year, the term "visual novel" was used during the development and release cycle of Tactics's Moon (1997). Video game journalist Koji Fukuyama wrote that while he lacked empirical data, he believed that companies such as Leaf, Tactics, and Key may have spread the common usage of the "visual novel" term.

== Characteristics ==
An example of a NVL ("Novel") format of text boxes in a visual novel made in NScripter.

Game genres are commonly conceptualized and occasionally named after, specific sets of control schemas, mechanics, player goals, and narrative structures. Janelynn Camingue, Elin Cartendottir, and Edward F. Melcer published their research of academic and commercial literature of what was considered a visual novel in 2021. They found that most definitions of visual novels as a genre only contained a small number of elements of what would define the genre. Their studies showed existing academic writing on the genre had a variety of definitions that could vary wildly with no clearly defined consensus on what set features defined the genre.

In an attempt to create a core definition pulled from the various sources and played through a corpus of 54 visual novels, the three proposed a definition based on the re-occurring elements as described by previous academic research and how regularly the elements appeared in at last 95% of their selection of games. They described visual novels to be digitally-based narrative-focused games. These games require players to be able to impact the story's progression or world.

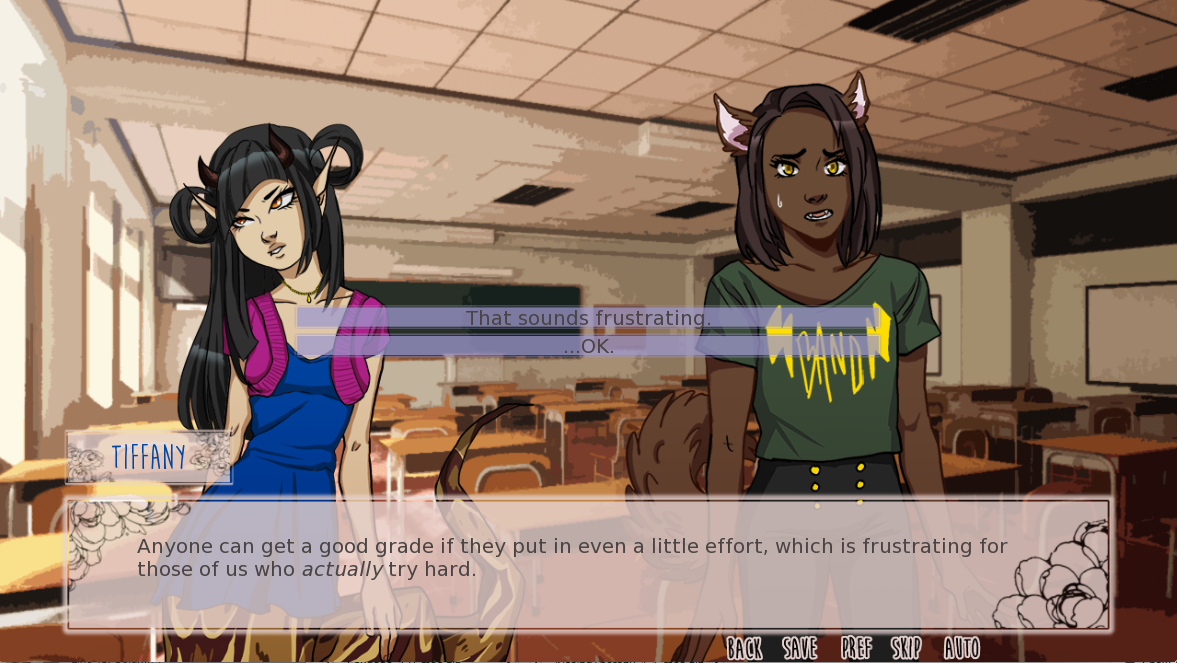
An example of an ADV ("Adventure") format of text boxes in a visual novel, which also features static images of characters and background art.

The story and interactions in the games are commonly presented through a text box and often employ forms of interaction which includes menu-choices. These menu options often employ additional forms of interaction including choices with set actions the player can perform or dialogue options that represent the player's character speech or thoughts. Visual novels have their stories progress when the player clicks, taps, or presses a button to see the next part of the story. The aesthetics of visual novels are often conveyed through static images of characters, background art, soundtracks, and sound effects for feedback. They said that games presenting themselves as visual novels which did not feature these core features would likely confuse players or violate their expectations. The two most common textbox formats are ADV (short for "Adventure"), in which the box occupies only a part of the screen, and NVL ("Novel") in which the textbox fills almost the whole screen or the whole screen.

Camingue, Cartendottir, and Melcer said nine of the thirty definitions of visual novels said the genre contained branching stories. This can be seen in games like Steins;Gate 0 (2015), which has six different endings and two main story branches while 428: Shibuya Scramble (2008) could result in 85 endings. They said that linear structures were notably prevalent, with 18% of the games not having branching narratives such as popular games Phoenix Wright: Ace Attorney Trilogy (2014) and Danganronpa V3: Killing Harmony (2017). Choices in visual novels may have no immediate effect on the narrative, contributing instead to a complex system of potentialities and character relationships that resolves itself toward the end of a playthrough. A small portion of these titles, such as Planetarian: The Reverie of a Little Planet (2004) and Higurashi: When They Cry (2002), feature no branching path choices at all and are completely linear.

Camingue, Cartendottir, and Melcer found that their that visual imagery varied in definitions of visual novels. Some definitions described static images or illustrations. Others specified the use of images as backgrounds and character art. Several definitions specifically identify the Japanese influence on both the art and general aesthetics of visual novels, with four definitions stating that visuals have anime-inspired aesthetics. Nine definitions did not specify an art-style to the genre, which Camingue, Cartendottir, and Melcer attributed to the genres growth in development outside of Japan. Academic Mia Consalvo said that visual novels remained one of the most "Japanese" genres of video games, due to their use of Japanese tropes, themes and settings. One of the characteristics that the genre shares with anime fandom is discussion of the genre often infuses terminology and tropes that have become loan words in their adopted languages, such as doujinshi, nakige, and utsuge.

=== Regional genre differences ===
The English use of the term "visual novel" is often used for games that have Japanese aesthetics and copious amounts of text. Mark Kretzschmar and Sara Raffel, authors of The History and Allure of Interactive Visual Novels (2023), described this description as potentially "confusing and misleading" as Japanese creators would note there are distinctions between a "true visual novel" and Japanese adventure games. Japanese video game journalist Koji Fukuyama echoed this, saying that the term "visual novel" had different meanings in Japan and in the West. In Japan, visual novels are considered a sub-genre of adventure games. Fukuyama continued that audiences outside of Japan might describe games like The Portopia Serial Murder Case (1983) and Phoenix Wright: Ace Attorney (2001) as visual novels, while Japanese gamers would likely find them inappropriately categorized.

For most Japanese gamers, the term "visual novel" would bring to mind the novel-like bishōjo games of the late 1990s. These were games like gameplay that featured many anime-styled girls, which had begun appearing more on the market at the time. Kazutaka Kodaka, the creator of the Danganronpa franchise, echoed this saying there were two originating paths of the visual novels; games rooted in The Portopia Serial Murder Case, whose lineage led to games like Ace Attorney and Danganronpa, and the second being the bishōjo games. Game developer Jiro Ishii expanded on this, saying that the two major Japanese adventure game trends were titles that originated with "command-based" adventure games like Zork and The Portopia Serial Murder Case and titles with novel-like formats beginning with Otogirisō and Machi (1998). Ishii said that Japanese adventure games like Jesus (1987) and Snatcher (1988) may appear to be novel games but were linear, concluding that when one breaks down the systems of gameplay mechanics, the differences become more apparent.

=== Status as games ===
In the Western world, it has been questioned whether visual novels should be considered video games. Mikhail Fiadotau wrote in 2024 that Western audiences were divided on this on the basis of the limited interactivity within the releases. Due to the genre's heavy use of text and emphasis on reading as a central activity, visual novels have been compared to books or the Choose Your Own Adventure series as being digital counterparts. While the genre resembles books like the Choose Your Own Adventure series, Camingue, Cartendottir, and Melcer said that visual novels incorporated more involved and mechanical moves-and-constraint-based gameplay that impacted the progression of a story. They wrote that visual novels remain distinct from their non-digital and non-interactive counterparts as they show one snippet of text at a time as the player interacts with them. Fiadotau added that visual novels described as kinetic novels, which feature no choices for users, complicate the discussion. Titles such as Gnosia (2019) have had their status of being a visual novel questioned due to having too much gameplay between the novel segments.

In Japan, visual novels are generally accepted to be a genre of video games. Game developer Kotaro Uchikoshi asserted that visual novels are games at his panel discussion at the 2013 Game Developers Conference. He described them as video games with a larger emphasis on storytelling which included events that involve a viewer's conscious choices as to how the plot would unfold. He concluded that these choices affecting the overall outcome would mark visual novels to be games as much as chess, boxing, card games, or Tetris do. Academics in Games and Culture highlighted that Mark Kretzschmar and Sara Raffel, the authors of History and Allure of Interactive Visual Novels (2023), had acknowledged that the "very lack of choice has become a hallmark of visual novels" while highlighting that the authors did not hesitate to refer to visual novels as games and their users as gamers.

== Development ==
Various free and paid game engines have been made for developers to create visual novels. These game engines implement not only the basic functions of advancing in a game, playing back voice samples, or presenting graphics, but also various function such as managing flags as well as managing the loading and playing of save data. This would make development of a visual novel possible without having a programmer which is unique to the game development industry.

Visual novel games represent the majority of PC video games produced and sold in Japan, with around 500 releases each year. Average sales volume counted at 2000 units sold for each title with cost-recouping generally being at 3000 units sold. From a business perspective, the most significant feature of novel-styled games is they can be developed for low cost in short periods of time. Koyama wrote that the development period of Japanese visual novels generally lasts from a year to a year and a half with a budget of 20–30 million yen. This is lower than other game genres, as visual novels lack having to adjust difficulty balance, which exists in nearly all other genres of games. Debugging of these games is also considered a smaller task, as it is often limited to checking flag management, proofreading text, and checking for deviations in game direction. Koyama wrote that despite it being easier, many visual novels made by small companies for personal computers (PCs) often had inadequate debugging during development.

The process of localizing Japanese into English takes considerable time as not only text requires translation, but sometimes entire lines of dialogue or visuals must be adapted. Mike Engler, an editor for publisher Aksys Games said that Xblaze Code: Embryo (2013) was "light" in terms of translation with over than 400,000 Japanese characters making the English word count for the story text being 139,833. In comparison, Zero Escape: Virtue's Last Reward (2012) had over one million Japanese characters.

Indie game developers in the West also took advantage of the simplicity in developing visual novels. Anna Blackwell of Wireframe magazine and Kretzschmar and Raffel wrote that Ren'Py was among the most popular visual novel development kits. Krezschmar and Raffel found that over 7,800 visual novels developed with it by 2023. They hypothesized that its popularity was due to it being both free and open-source software whose extensive documentation allowed developers to learn its nuances.

== Genres and themes ==
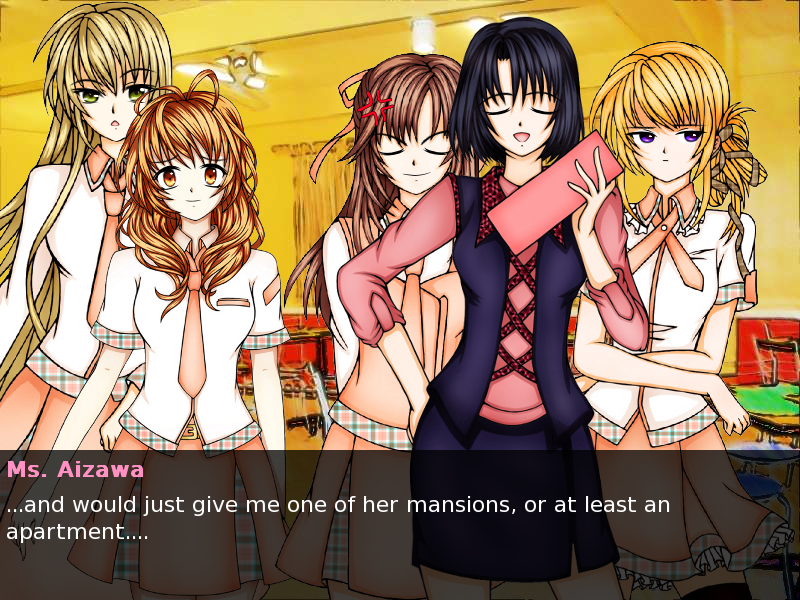
An example of a bishōjo-styled visual novel featuring various anime-styled girls.

Visual novels sometimes break general common definitions of the genre, according to Uchikoshi at the 2013 conference. Japanese visual novels have segments that intersperse with other gameplay genres. These include but are not limited to puzzle games in 999: Nine Hours, Nine Persons, Nine Doors (2009), fighting games with Melty Blood, role-playing video games with Princess Waltz (2006), and rhythm games such as Symphonic Rain (2004), and Danganronpa: Trigger Happy Havoc (2010) which has action elements to its gameplay. A small portion of visual novels have no branching path choices at all and are completely linear. This style of game are known as kinetic novels, and are named after the KineticNovel series of linear visual novels from the game company Visual Arts. Kretzschmar and Raffel, authors of The History and Allure of Interactive Visual Novels (2023), described another form called the sound novel. They said the term was used to primarily define Japanese games that rely on graphics and sounds instead of puzzles to tell a story, while the term was still generally interchangeable with the term "visual novel."

Narratively, visual novels' themes range from romance, horror, mystery, fantasy, science fiction, and hardboiled genres. Two journalists writing for Media Arts Current Contents (MACC) said that Western visual novels had more diverse range of themes, Japanese works more often emphasized romance. The relationship in visual novels range from bishōjo games, to otome games. Made in response to the bishōjo games, the otome games feature anime-style art and tend to have multiple stereotypical romantic partners such as cute younger males who range from being elite and haughty to demure and sensitive.

The majority of Japanese erotic games, or eroge, are novel-styled games; this was brought about by Key's titles, particularly Kanon (1999) and Air (2000), and by visual novels being easily made by small game development teams and with low budgets. These visual novels can depict male-on-male or female-on-female homoerotic relationships called yaoi and yuri respectively. The narratives of these games are generally tailored towards heterosexual audiences. The amount of sexual content in these games range from being loosely into their stories to visual novels that require sexual content to advance a purposely disturbing story. Some titles, such as Air, have been released in versions with and without sexual content as a way to broaden their appeal.

The nakige, or crying game, genre involves a comedic in the first half, a heart-warming romantic middle, followed by a tragic separation and an emotional get together. This formula was established by the eroge visual novel One: Kagayaku Kisetsu e (1998). Its lead planner, Jun Maeda, credits the basis of nakige to Dōkyūsei (1992), Yu-no (1996), Shizuku (1996), Kizuato (1996), and To Heart (1997). Hiroki Azuma suggested that this "melodramatic turn" in visual novels that which had both sentimental stories and illustrations were to compensate for the technical limitations of 1990s home computers. As these titles could not process complex animations or sounds, this led this the flourishing of this style to convey drama. Maeda said the nakige only came into use around the release of Kanon. Nakige also spawned another variation, the utsuge or "depressing game". They feature no happy endings and have few interactive choices. Nitroplus, who specializes in utsuge titles like Saya no Uta: The Song of Saya (2003) for example, has two interactive choices with two options each. Ana Matilde Sousa described utsuge as being "unconducive to players' feeling "properly" rewarded at the end of the game." Kretzschmar and Raffel described these titles as designed to "challenge, disturb, provoke, and at times even mock us to the point that they become difficult to finish." They concluded that "For many gamers, utsuge eroge are a nonstarter as they feature both pornography and human suffering" while Sousa specifically found Saya no Uta to be an eroge that is "anything but erotic" and a challenge to the notion of "normative "fun" in video games."

== History ==
=== Early adventure game influences ===
Visual novels are rooted in early adventure games. Titles like Colossal Cave Adventure only displayed text to a screen and involved the player controlling the game by directly inputting words to progress and focused more on exploration than character advancement. It featured what game journalist Koji Fukuyama described as "a literary quality" and "a strong sense of experiencing a story." Similar games would follow that expanded on the genre, such as Mystery House (1980) which added graphics to the text creating the graphic adventure genre. Other games like Wizard and the Princess (1980) included multiple routes to reach an end game, and Mission Asteroid (1980) which featured character dialogue; all elements which would have connections to visual novels. Fukuyama wrote that culture magazines like Hot-Dog Press introduced foreign adventure games to Japan in 1981 and 1982 with articles about popular PC games in the United States. The first full-page article on these adventure games was in ASCII and Japan's first adventure game with Omotesandō Adventure (1982). Small and obscure companies like Micro Cabin would released bootleg versions of games like Mystery House with slight plot adjustments under the same name. Fukuyama said that by 1983, the number of Japanese adventure games "exploded" with several Japanese versions of American adventure games being released.

Other early influences on visual novels include The Portopia Serial Murder Case (1983), which would introduce elements of allowing players to instantly move to specified locations, omitting the intervening spaces as they do in film, novels, and anime. Other Japanese adventure games would introduce characters with autonomy, such as in Hironobu Sakaguchi's The Death Trap (1984) where characters would speak autonomously in addition to the computer's response text. In the following year, the computers response text was integrated within the protagonist's dialogue in adventure games like Tokyo Nampa Street and Karuizawa Yuukai Annai. These techniques of the characters' soliloquies driving the story forward would be used in 21st century series like Ace Attorney. While Fukuyama wrote that Japanese adventure games reached a peak form in the late 1980s with titles with rich visuals such as Snatcher (1988) and Jesus (1987), Koyama wrote that the amount of Japanese adventure games released decreased in 1988 and 1989, as RPGs grew more appealing to Japanese audiences.

=== 1990s ===
The games that directly influenced the style of modern visual novels were Chunsoft's Otogirisō (1992) and Banshee's Last Cry (1994) for the Super Famicom. Both featured visual elements that would be used in later novel games, such as a user interface in which the text of the game's story is superimposed on an image covering the entire screen. Both games also apply a looping narrative, where the player repeats the same narrative to continue the game. In Banshee's Last Cry, the player tries to go through the narrative several times to find the murder culprit. Similar mechanics would be used for titles like Yu-no (1996), where the player experiences the same time loop in order to rescue the heroine. Among its features, Yu-no featured the ability to for the player to not only see the branching narratives on screen, but also re-do branches which allow the player to revisit previously seen narrative paths or access previously unseen ones.

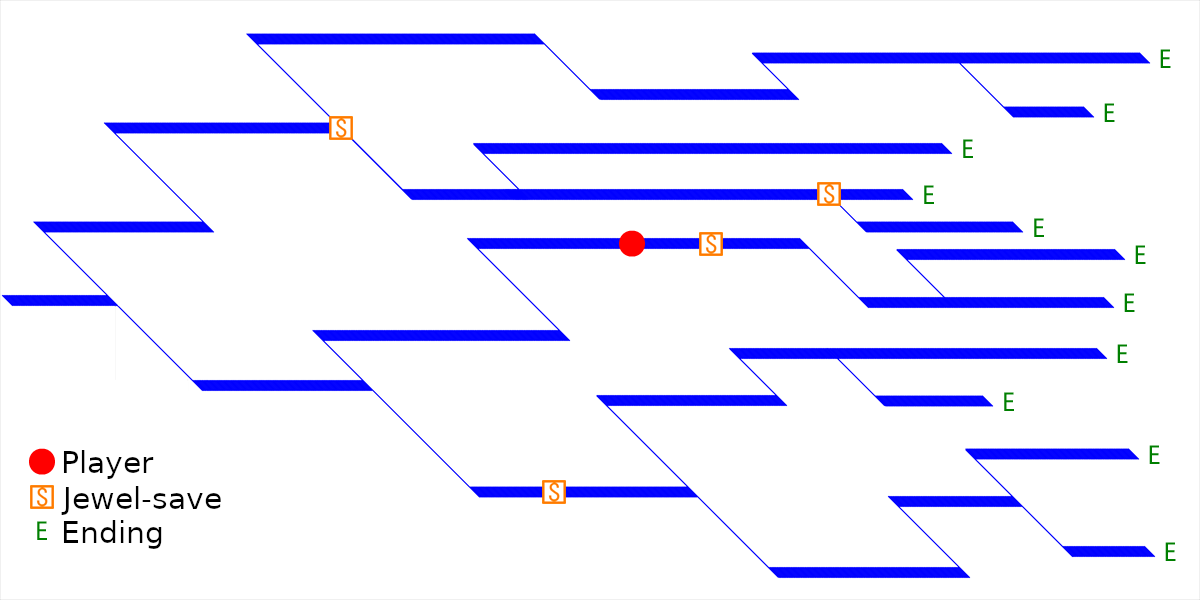
Schematics of the divergence map in Yu-no (1996). Yu-no featured the ability for players to see the branching narratives on screen and re-do narrative branches.

With the Japanese release of the Windows 95 operating system in November 1995, the number of PCs in Japanese homes began to rise. Microsoft provided the development tool DirectX free of charge which supported features not natively available on hardware without the need to pay royalties. This led to a tailwind in PC game development. Influenced by both of Chunsoft's games, two novel-like games for PC were released in 1996 for MS-DOS for PC-9801 and Microsoft Windows for IBM PCs: Leaf's Shizuku and Kizuato. The two games combined elements of the two Chunsoft game and the bishōjo games to create what Fukuyama described as a new genre in Japan called the visual novel. Koyama said that the popularity of adventure games in Japan only returned after the releases from Chunsoft and Leaf.

Leaf's third visual novel To Heart (1997) was a romance novel game. It was a hit in Japan, and its settings led to schools as being the location the majority of novel games were set. At the same time, the company Tactics released two novel games: a thriller titled Moon (1997) and a school-set story with One: Kagayaku Kisetsu e (1998). The development team of these two titles would form the independent game company Key. Hiroki Azuma wrote in 2001 that the technological advancement of consumer video game consoles had a negative effect on novel games, as there was little use for taking advantage of animation and real-time 3-D graphics. The paucity of these features in visual novels benefitted the low-budget Japanese erotic games (eroge) industry of PCs. Azuma continued that these adult titles were developed for more rudimentary home computers and the games were "stripped of unnecessary literary or artistic flair" that "most efficiently reflects the otaku's passion toward moe-elements." As a result, some novel games had lost characteristics of bishōjo games and instead created what Azuma described as a "unique world" with more emphasis on moe-elements instead of pornographic ones which would particularly be seen in Key's Kanon (1999) and Air (2000). Koyama said that the market for novel games was "completely established" with Kanon. Both To Heart and Kanon made novel games the standard genre for romance-themed Japanese video games. Koyama wrote that the demand from players to concentrate on narratives and the motivations from game developers to create inexpensive and easier to design games led to the novel-styled games to dominate the Japanese market over similar genres like dating sims.

Kretzschmar and Raffel said that only Westerners who actively sought visual novels around 1996 were diehard anime or visual novel fans. English-language ports of Japanese visual novels were described by them as "basically non-existent" in the 1990s and early 2000s. During this period, the company JAST USA became one of the first to publish and port Japanese visual novels and dating sims to Western audiences. Most of these games were eroge such as Season of the Sakura (1996) and Divi-Dead (1998).

=== 2000s ===
In 1999 the game development tools KiriKiri and NScripter were made available to the public which ushered in a wave of doujin games which included titles like Tsukihime (2000) and Higurashi When They Cry (2002). This Japanese scene was called doujin, and involved developers who had a shared appreciation of popular culture. These were games were primarily made for PC, and developed by individuals or small teams of enthusiasts. A significant amount of the doujin games are pornographic in nature. Some of the games grew beyond their doujin culture, such as Higurashi When They Cry which began as a visual novel that sold at comic markets, and grew to become a transmedia franchise with its own anime series, a manga, a live action film, multiple novels, and an action game. In 2006, visual novels accounted for upward of 70% of PC game market in Japan. This boom period of bishojo was largely contained within the PC market from the mid-1990s to the 2000s. Japan's market for such titles subsequently shrunk, with what Automaton described as a small revival with the emergence of the digital distribution service Steam, which also made these games more accessible to non-Japanese speaking players.

Studios like Leaf and Key, followed by Nitroplus, Overflow, and 5pb achieved success with media that centered around anime adaptations. With the popularity of anime growing in the West in the 2000s, Western audiences became familiar with some of these visual novel series from their anime adaptations. Fan-translations of visual novels became more common in the 2000s as evidenced by through unofficial translations of Tsukihime in 2006 and Kanon in 2009. By the mid-2000s, Western developers began creating their own novel games. Two journalists writing for Media Arts Current Contents (MACC) described these earlier titles as "unremarkable" and not attracting much attention.

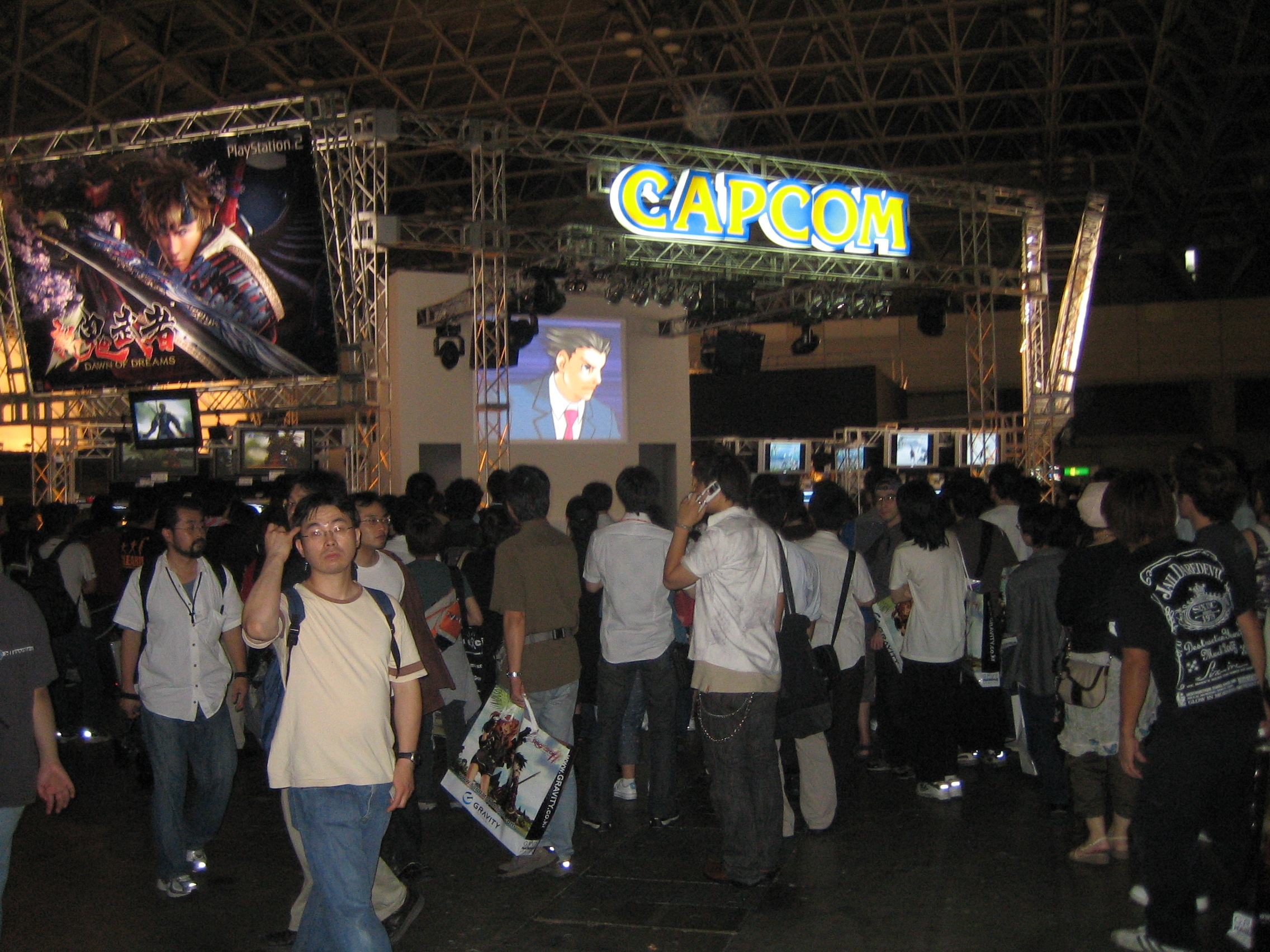
Capcom at the Tokyo Game Show in 2005. Gameplay of Phoenix Wright: Ace Attorney is projected in the background.

In the early 2000s, Phoenix Wright: Ace Attorney (2001) was released in Japan. While Japanese audiences understood the game as deriving from the "command select method" of adventure games, Western reception to the game's belated 2005 English release saw it as part of the lineage of visual novels. Kretzschmar and Raffel described the English release of Phoenix Wright: Ace Attorney in 2005 as a "turning point" of games seen as visual novels being successful for Western audiences. While similar Japanese games were released in the period such as Trace Memory (2005) and Hotel Dusk (2007), only the Ace Attorney series sold well outside of Japan in the 2000s. The belatedly released games such as Danganronpa: Trigger Happy Havoc (2010) and the Ace Attorney games were described by the MACC writers as pioneering for Western developers, who would later create similar titles like Paradise Killer (2020).

=== 2010s ===
John Pickett of the publisher MangaGamer discussed the difficulties of making visual novels successful beyond their niche audience to Western markets in the early 2010s. Pickett said that finding content without anime-style artwork was "very difficult". He said that while there were "countless" visual novels released in Japan for consoles and digital distributors, he described it as "extremely difficult" to release visual novels in the West as they were not seen as games. By 2014, Pickett said it took Go! Go! Nippon! (2011) and Higurashi When They Cry (2002) a year to be accepted by Steam's greenlight process. He said that after Go! Go! Nippon! sold over 16,000 copies on Steam that Valve became more open to release visual novels on their platform. In 2015, Mia Consalvo described visual novels as gradually becoming more popular outside of Japan, while still being one of the least exported styles of game coming from the country. Some Japanese developers removed erotic content from their novel games to be able to distribute them on Steam. Leaf co-founder Naoya Shimokawa described doing this as a difficult process, and made him more aware of differences in standards between Japan and the rest of the world. By 2016, the genre had its own category on Steam.

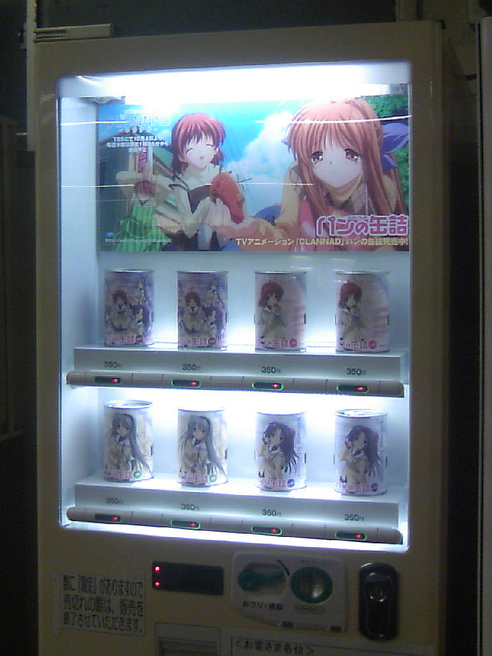
A vending machine promoting an anime series based on Clannad in 2007 at Akihabara Station in Tokyo. While developers made novel games outside Japan in 2010s, they lacked the impact that Japanese novel games had to expand into multimedia franchises.

Western developers of novel games began to receive more attention with the expansion of the indie game scene. This led to the release of Western titles such as Digital: A Love Story (2010), Sakura Spirit (2014), and Everlasting Summer (2014). Marques Pedro of Game Developer said that while great titles have been produced by Western developers, they lacked the impact of titles like Clannad (2004) and Fate/Stay Night (2004) which received high sales, positive critical reception, and adaptations for other media. Christopher Ortiz, director of Sukeban Games, said in 2019 that Western developers were "a bit behind when it comes to production values", concluding that he did not believe there was a Western visual novel developer that could make titles in competition with Steins;Gate or titles by Nitroplus.

Throughout the 2010s, visual novels which featuring queer romance became more visible. Following the wake of Gamergate, North American indie designers used the free game development engines to create games that were described in Verge: Studies in Global Asias as a new wave of visual novels that were politicized games with queer themes such as Butterfly Soup (2017) and Dream Daddy (2017). They described them as "politically progressive, inclusive, and queer game genres". Other popular games that subvert the romance tropes of Japanese visual novels appeared, such as the Japanese title Hatoful Boyfriend (2011) and the Western-made Doki Doki Literature Club! (2017).

In 2019, gamebusiness.jp described a contemporary trend for visual novels in China. Fukuyama said while there were earlier predecessors, he described the turning point for the genre as the release of Renai Simulation Tkool 2 in 2004, which sparked a surge in visual novel production in China and Taiwan. By the early 2010s, video game developers in these two countries began producing a considerable number of titles. The Chinese visual novel The Invisible Guardian (2019) briefly topped the sales of the global best sellers list in 2019 on Steam despite being region locked.

Towards the late 2010s, novel games in Japan adopted various visual forms such as utilizing new devices such as virtual reality headsets such as Tokyo Chronos (2019), or adopting an older gameplay and visual aesthetics with games like Retro Mystery Club Vol.1: The Ise-Shima Case (2019). In Tokyo Kronos, text is displayed in front of the player like traditional visual novels while the characters are life-sized and move and interact with each other. An overview of the style from CNET found that characters movements are were generally modest, with as an emphasis still placed on either reading text or listening to a character's voice.

=== 2020s ===
By 2020, there were 2,272 visual novel games available via Steam. Doki Doki Literature Club! (2017) sold over 500,000 copies within its first two months of commercial release in 2021. Kretzschmar and Raffel wrote in 2023 that they expected the visual novel to remain at least at a fringe level of popularity, due to the changing tastes of Western game audiences. They described these audiences now finding the "Japanese-ness" of visual novels as being a "selling point, not a cultural obstacle". Academic Carl Therrien described the Western-based website The Visual Novel Database as revealing of a dedicated fanbase via their contributions to the website. By 2019, fans had documented over 24,000 titles, which has grown to over 50,000 titles in 2024. Towards the mid-2020s, Japanese creators Kazutaka Kodaka and Jiro Ishii discussed the status of Japanese narrative adventure games. Ishii said that he felt that only a few games felt new to him such as the Zero Escape series or 13 Sentinels: Aegis Rim (2019) which had non-linear narratives not bound to time or space or games or Gnosia (2019) which he said had roguelike elements to the narrative. He found that neither series "reached the level of explosiveness" that could "cause a stir in the game market" like earlier titles such as Higurashi or Steins;Gate had done. Kodaka added in 2026 that he hoped for a "revolutionary work showing a completely new way of storytelling will come from Japan" similar to games like Return of the Obra Dinn (2018) or No Case Should Remain Unsolved (2024). Kai, a scenario developer on Key's visual novel Anemoi (2026), said that visual novel games for the PC were beginning to disappear from the game market due to various factors. These ranged from poor cost-effectiveness and how the general changes in the entertainment landscape. Games tagged as visual novels on Steam by August 2026 generally maintained slightly above-average revenue.

Visual novels were influenced by the AI boom of the early 2020s. Fukuyama described that in 2024 there was wavering indecision between wariness and acceptance of AI algorithms being woven into video game mechanics. AI has been used for smaller indie projects such as Boku to AI no Natsuyasumi in 2022 and Jiro Ishii's Depth Loop (2026) for Kemco. Boku to AI no Natsuyasumi used AI to develop the graphics of the game to complete it in two weeks, while Ishii said that the developers of Depth Loop utilized AI technology to create behavioral patterns for characters and support all of the game's end scenarios. Kodaka questioned whether the visual novel he co-directed, The Hundred Line: Last Defense Academy (2025), would be the last large-scale visual developed without the use of AI.

== Legacy ==
Azuma wrote in his book Otaku: Japan's Database Animals (2001) that the role novel games have played in otaku culture was "enormous." He expanded on this saying that after characters from Neon Genesis Evangelion, the most influential character in the subculture was neither originating from anime or manga for male otaku, but "probably 'Multi'" from the visual novel To Heart (1997).

Carl Therrien wrote in 2019 that it was difficult to find discussion of visual novels in game studies, writing that the term "visual novel" only appears once in Tristan Donovan's Replay: The History of Video Games (2010), and said that video game historiography may "never be attracted to this 'minor' ludic genre." Sousa similarly wrote that visual novels, remained an overlooked subject in the study of Japanese pop culture and video games alike. Academic Luca Bruno expanded on this, writing in 2021 that the production and circulation of Japanese visual novel games was so vast and too dispersed for proper isolated research to return results on a comprehensive scales. Visual novels attract less attention from the retro gaming communities per their cheaper trading prices, which Therrien suggested a lack of interest or perceived value.

== See also ==
- Japanese pop culture in the United States
- Video games in Japan
