= List of Little Busters! episodes =

Cover art of the first BD/DVD compilation volume released by Warner Home Video, featuring main character Rin Natsume

The Little Busters! anime television series is based on the visual novel Little Busters! and its expanded version Little Busters! Ecstasy by the Japanese visual novel brand Key. The episodes, produced by the animation studio J.C.Staff, are directed by Yoshinobu Yamakawa, written by Michiru Shimada, and features character design by chief animator Haruko Iizuka who based the designs on Itaru Hinoue's and Na-Ga's original concepts. The story follows a group of childhood friends (Riki Naoe, Rin Natsume, Kyousuke Natsume, Masato Inohara and Kengo Miyazawa) now attending high school called the Little Busters, as they decide to form a baseball team. Riki, who is diagnosed with narcolepsy, is tasked to recruit more girls in preparation for a baseball game, and he bonds with each of them on account of their internal conflicts. Meanwhile, Rin gets mysterious letters from her cat Lennon to complete various tasks in order to learn the "secret to this world".

The 26-episode series aired between October 6, 2012, and April 6, 2013, on the Tokyo MX television network in Japan. It aired at later dates than Tokyo MX on AT-X, BS11, Gunma TV, MBS, Tochigi TV, TV Aichi and TV Kanagawa. The series was also streamed by Crunchyroll with English subtitles. The anime series was released on a set of nine BD/DVD compilation volumes between December 26, 2012, and August 28, 2013, by Warner Home Video in limited and regular editions. A BD containing an original video animation (OVA) episode was available for mail order to those who bought all nine limited edition BD/DVD volumes. The anime has been licensed by Sentai Filmworks, and two BD/DVD collections were released on November 19, 2013, and April 22, 2014.

A 13-episode second season, titled Little Busters! Refrain, aired between October 5 and December 28, 2013, on AT-X; it aired at later dates than Tokyo MX on BS11, MBS, TV Aichi and Tokyo MX. The episodes were released on seven BD/DVD compilation volumes between January 29 and July 30, 2014, by Warner Home Video in limited and regular editions. Refrain has also been licensed by Sentai Filmworks, and it was released on BD and DVD on January 20, 2015. A series of eight OVA episodes titled Little Busters! EX, based on the Ecstasy version of the game, are included on the BD/DVD releases of Refrain. Sentai Filmworks also licensed Little Busters! EX.

The first anime series makes use of two main pieces of theme music: the opening theme "Little Busters! (TV animation ver.)" and the ending theme "Alicemagic (TV animation ver.)". Both songs are sung by Rita and are remixes of the theme songs featured in the original Little Busters! visual novel. Two additional ending themes by Rita include the original version of "Alicemagic" used in episodes 6 and 18, and "Amenochi Hare" (雨のち晴れ, Clear Weather After the Rain) used in episodes 14 and 23.

The second season Refrain again makes use of two main pieces of theme music: the opening theme "Boys be Smile" by Suzuyu and the ending theme is "Kimi to no Nakushi Mono" (君とのなくしもの) by Ayaka Kitazawa. Three additional ending themes used in Refrain include "Song for friends" by Rita used in episodes three, eight and nine; "Hanabi" by Lia used in episode six; and "Little Busters! (Little Jumper Ver.)" by Rita used in episode 13. Two songs are also used as insert songs: "Haruka Kanata" (遥か彼方) by Rita in episode 11, and "Song for friends" in episode 13.

The OVA series Little Busters! EX also has two main pieces of theme music: the opening theme "Little Busters! EX" by Rita and the ending theme "Mezameta Asa ni wa Kimi ga Tonari ni" (目覚めた朝にはきみが隣に) by Suzuyu. The rest of the soundtrack for the entire anime series is sampled from albums released for the visual novels, Little Busters! Original Soundtrack and Little Busters! Ecstasy Tracks, and the Little Busters! Refrain Original Soundtrack.

== Little Busters! ==
No.	Title	Original release date	English release date
1	"The Team Name Will Be...The Little Busters"; Transliteration: "Chīmu Mei wa...Ritoru Basutāzu da" (Japanese: チーム名は…リトルバスターズだ)	October 6, 2012	November 19, 2013
Awakened early in the morning by someone announcing the return of Kyousuke Natsume, Riki Naoe goes to stop his roommate Masato Inohara from having a friendly duel with Kengo Miyazawa. When Riki asks Kyousuke to intercede, Kyousuke tells them to fight only with objects thrown from the crowd of onlookers. Kyousuke's younger sister Rin Natsume disapproves when Masato tries to use a white cat as his weapon, causing Kengo to lose interest. Riki reminisces how he has been friends with Kyousuke, Masato, Kengo and Rin since childhood when they brought him into their group called the Little Busters. Riki later suggests that the five of them do something together like they used to, and Kyousuke proposes that they play baseball under the team name the Little Busters. Kengo immediately excuses himself from this, as he has to prepare for a kendo tournament. Later that night, Kyousuke dispatches Rin to the girls' dormitory to try recruiting new members. After a few failed attempts, Rin is confronted by Sasami Sasasegawa and three other members of the softball team, though Rin ends up losing the fight. The next day, as Riki tries recruiting new members, he follows a girl to the school's roof.
2	"If You're Happy, I'm Happy"; Transliteration: "Kimi ga Shiawase ni Naru to, Watashi mo Shiawase" (Japanese: 君が幸せになると、私も幸せ)	October 13, 2012	November 19, 2013
On the school's roof, Riki finds Komari Kamikita, a clumsy girl from his class who craves snacks and sweets. Riki attempts to recruit Komari for the baseball team, only to realize that she may not be well-suited for baseball. After lunchtime, Riki later finds Rin shirking her classroom blackboard duty to play with several cats, in which the white cat named Lennon has two notes tied to it. The first note says, "There is a secret to this world. If you want to learn it, you must complete all the tasks you are about to receive." The second note says, "This is the first task. Resolve the sanitation issue in the boys' dorm storage room." Riki doubts the sincerity of the notes, but Rin is excited to take on the first task. Rin gathers up Riki, Kyousuke and Masato to clean the storage room. Komari finds them there and agrees to join their baseball team, but they all get to work cleaning the storage room first. On the baseball field, Kyousuke welcomes Komari onto the baseball team despite her complete lack of athletic ability. Soon after, Riki collapses from an attack of narcolepsy, which he has suffered since childhood.
3	"I Like Cute Things"; Transliteration: "Kawaii Mono wa Suki da yo, Watashi wa" (Japanese: 可愛いものは好きだよ、私は)	October 20, 2012	November 19, 2013
After Riki recovers from his attack of narcolepsy, the members of the Little Busters baseball team have morning practice. Masato gives Riki back his idiom dictionary in a plastic bag, albeit in a smelly condition. Haruka Saigusa, a girl from a different class, wantonly borrows the idiom dictionary before Riki can chase after her. He accidentally runs into the desk of Yuiko Kurugaya, a genius girl who is often absent from class. As Riki struggles to buy coffee from a vending machine during a class break, Yuiko drags him away to a "cafe terrace" set up with wooden furniture among some hedges. Riki ultimately loses track of time during their conversation, later dashing back to class when he hears the tardy bell. Haruka gives Riki back the idiom dictionary and berates him over its disgusting state under the cover. When Masato and Kengo start another duel, Yuiko intervenes, causing Kengo to lose interest. Masato and Yuiko initially fight with the rules that Kyousuke previously set up, but Yuiko loses after she severely kicks Masato several times. Later, Yuiko catches the Little Busters baseball team during practice and joins them, proving to be a powerful asset.
4	"To Make a Happy, Sunny Place"; Transliteration: "Shiawase no Hidamari o Tsukuru no desu" (Japanese: 幸せのひだまりを作るのです)	October 27, 2012	November 19, 2013
Riki helps his classmate Kudryavka Noumi carry her boxes into her new dorm room one afternoon. The next day, Riki goes to the school roof to thank Komari in place of Rin for taking care of Fabre, a cat that was injured. However, Riki overhears Komari sleep-talking about her brother. When she wakes up, she admits that she is an only child and that her brother only appears in her dreams to read her a picture book about an egg and a chick. The following day, Riki and Rin go to the school roof, only to find Komari a little sad. She found the picture book from her dreams in the storage room. Based on the name Takuya Kamikita on the back cover, Komari suspects that her brother was the author, but she cannot remember anything about him. Riki and Rin accompany Komari to a nursing home, and the other members of the Little Busters decide to tag along to volunteer. Riki enters the room of a loud and grumpy old man, cleaning the room regardless. After the old man scares away Komari, he reveals himself as Kojirō Kamikita and tells Riki to never bring her near him again.
5	"To Look For What I Lost"; Transliteration: "Nakushimono o Sagashi ni" (Japanese: なくしものを探しに)	November 3, 2012	November 19, 2013
Komari continues to dream about her brother, who Riki suspects may be already dead. Riki goes to see Kojirō to learn more about Takuya. Kojirō merely tells Riki that he should not pry further into the matter if he cares about Komari. Unable to sleep, Riki goes out to buy a coffee and encounters Komari at the school gate, who had gone out to buy snacks. She invites him up to the school roof to watch a meteor shower, where they spend the rest of the night making wishes. Komari asks Riki to go on a date with her so she can search for her lost memories. They take a train to go to where Komari used to live and they end up taking a boat out on a lake. Riki suggests to her that she does not necessarily have to look for her brother, and Komari jokingly asks him if he will be her brother. It starts raining on their way back towards school, and while running to find shelter, Riki spots a dead kitten. Komari starts sobbing uncontrollably as she recalls memories of her brother.
6	"I'll Find Amazing Things"; Transliteration: "Mitsukeyō Suteki na Koto" (Japanese: みつけよう すてきなこと)	November 10, 2012	November 19, 2013
Riki brings Komari back to his dorm room to freshen up after her sudden breakdown. She remembers everything about her dead brother Takuya, recalling the time they spent together in the hospital. Takuya wrote a picture book for her, soon letting her know that he might be gone when she woke up. However, he told her not to be sad because it will all be a dream. When Komari had awoken, Takuya died. She remembered what he had said and did not despair. When Rin and Yuiko arrive to escort Komari back to her dorm room, Komari begins using a defense mechanism to believe that Riki is her brother. Kyousuke later states that only Riki can help Komari. Riki speaks with Kojirō, who explains that this defense mechanism happens every time Komari witnesses death, and that she will return to normal in a few weeks. Nonetheless, a determined Riki stays up all night to extend Takuya's picture book, with support from his friends, in order to get through to Komari. The next day, Riki forces Komari to accept Takuya's death, but through the extension of the picture book, he shows her that she has friends to support her.
7	"Now, Who Could I Be?"; Transliteration: "Sate, Watashi wa Dare Deshō?" (Japanese: さて、わたしは誰でしょう?)	November 17, 2012	November 19, 2013
Kyousuke appoints Riki with the sole duty of finding even more members for the baseball team. Riki and Rin come upon Haruka after school and bring her along to the baseball field during practice, but the disciplinary committee members suddenly take away Haruka because she skipped detention. The next morning, the disciplinary committee members come looking for Haruka again, but she runs away with Riki in tow. They end up face to face with the disciplinary committee chairman Kanata Futaki, who reprimands Riki for always causing trouble with his friends. After school, Riki returns to the classroom to get his gym clothes before baseball practice. He finds Haruka restoring a desk back to new that Masato accidentally broke during an earlier duel with Rin, in which Haruka reveals that she is a maintenance committee member. Riki and Haruka are later stopped by the disciplinary committee members because they suspect that Haruka unlawfully obtained four canned drinks from a vending machine. Riki offers to pay for the drinks, with help from Rin, so Haruka can be left alone. Riki officially recruits Haruka as a baseball team member, and Kyousuke welcomes Haruka into the Little Busters after she passes the membership test.
8	"Let's Look for a Roommate"; Transliteration: "Rettsu, Rukkingu Fō Rūmumeito nano desu" (Japanese: れっつ、るっきんぐふぉーるーむめいとなのです)	November 24, 2012	November 19, 2013
Riki, Rin and Masato come across Kudryavka playing fetch with her two dogs named Strelka and Belka, and they invite her to join the baseball team. After Kudryavka shows her athleticism of catching, she is quickly accepted onto the baseball team. Later, Riki and Masato help Kudryavka carry some boxes into her dorm room, in which she is without a roommate but wants one. Riki suggests that they ask A-Chan, the resident assistant of the girls' dormitory, who puts out a notice on the dorm mailing list. Rin and Yuiko each do not have roommates, but both end up refusing for personal reasons. After walking around, Riki and Kudryavka chance upon their classmate Mio Nishizono reading a book under a tree. Upon learning she also has no roommate, they ask about her rooming with Kudryavka, but Mio refuses in the end because she believes all the books she has in her room would cause problems for Kudryavka. While Kudryavka dismays over not finding a roommate, Kanata comes by and is willing to accept Kudryavka as her roommate, much to Kudryavka's joy.
9	"Save the Cafeteria!"; Transliteration: "Gakushoku o Sukue!" (Japanese: 学食を救え)	December 1, 2012	November 19, 2013
After baseball practice, Riki and Rin receive a second mysterious letter tied to Lennon, which says, "Save the cafeteria." They go and ask a cafeteria lady if there are any problems, but she says that nothing is wrong. Rin starts an argument with Sasami and the softball team with the sogginess of korokke soba versus tempura soba, though Rin loses the fight again. Rin later informs Riki that all of the cafeteria ladies have left the cafeteria in lieu of preparing dinner due to various emergencies. Remembering the second task at hand, Rin gathers the other members of the Little Busters to help prepare dinner for the whole school. Riki wonders how the writer of the note foresaw this event. The members of the Little Busters help prepare three set meals. During the hustle and bustle of handing out meals to students, Riki collapses from an attack of narcolepsy. Riki wakes up in his dorm room, and Kyousuke comes to bring him back to the cafeteria, where the remaining members of the Little Busters are waiting for Riki to start eating dinner.
10	"The Blue Above in the Sky, Or the Blue of the Ocean"; Transliteration: "Sora no Ao Umi no Ao" (Japanese: 空の青 海のあを)	December 8, 2012	November 19, 2013
Riki is entrusted with finding the last member of the Little Busters to have a full baseball team of nine members. Riki hits a foul ball that consequently hits Mio, and he brings her a compress the next day. He notices that Mio always carries a parasol and that he always sees her reading under the same tree in the courtyard. She is known by other classmates as "shadow-less" because of the parasol and the fact that she does not have much presence. Using the same mentality of being helped by Kyousuke and the others during childhood, Riki asks Mio to join the Little Busters baseball team, only for her to decline the offer. After gym class, Yuiko enlists Riki to help find Mio's favorite book. Riki and Mio are unable to find it inside the classroom, thinking that someone may have hidden it as a joke. However, Yuiko arrives to explain that there was no wrongdoing, and Mio briefly meets Itō, the classmate who previously held onto her favorite book, revealed as a poetry collection. Kyousuke, Komari and Kudryavka summon Riki for baseball practice, and Mio goes to watch the Little Busters from the sidelines.
11	"Horror Cool-Down Contest"; Transliteration: "Horā No Ryo Taikai" (Japanese: ホラー・NO・RYO大会)	December 15, 2012	November 19, 2013
Kyousuke sets up a test of courage for the Little Busters in the school at night. After splitting up into three teams, each team must retrieve four talismans in the school left by Kyousuke, who has set up various traps within the school. The first team, consisting of Rin, Komari and Kudryavka, are scared and find proceeding through the school to be difficult. The second team, consisting of Masato and Kengo, race to Kyousuke's classroom to retrieve the first talisman. The final team, consisting of Yuiko, Riki and Haruka go around easily retrieving the talismans. However, Yuiko leaves Riki and Haruka behind to scare Rin, Komari and Kudryavka. The Little Busters later take notice of a large black mass believed to be a vengeful spirit. With help from Mio, they manage to corner and catch the vengeful spirit after flashing the lights and making noises. They discover that it is in fact a large eagle named Chirpy that had followed Kyousuke back from Hokkaido many years ago and had come back to see him. Having reunited, the Little Busters watch as Chirpy flies away the next morning.
12	"The Sky of Endless Blue"; Transliteration: "Mugen ni Tsuzuku Aoi Sora o" (Japanese: 無限に続く青い空を)	December 22, 2012	November 19, 2013
Riki invites Mio to be the baseball team's manager, which she ultimately accepts after initially thinking that they were starting an all-male idol group. After Mio reveals to the Little Busters that she will not participate during baseball practice and that she has an aversion to sunlight, Kyousuke still welcomes Mio into the Little Busters. After baseball practice, Mio brings everyone hot tea, and they exchange phone numbers with her. The next day, Kyousuke gathers the Little Busters together in preparation for a tanka competition held at school. However, Mio is left alone partway through when the others decide to write one line of poetry each, but with failed results. Riki later finds Mio sitting under her usual tree, and he soon realizes that she wants to fly off somewhere and disappear. Riki tells Mio that there was a girl resembling her in town, but she was not carrying a parasol. Before leaving, Mio tells him that she plans on submitting a tanka in the competition. The following day, Mio is absent from school, and Riki overhears his classmates gossiping about the same girl in town without the parasol. After school, Riki sees the girl standing below in the courtyard.
13	"The Place Where the End Begins"; Transliteration: "Owari no Hajimaru Basho e" (Japanese: 終わりの始まる場所へ)	January 5, 2013	November 19, 2013
The girl who looks like Mio in the courtyard soon disappears in a flash. Mio remains absent from school for a few days, and Riki's friends slowly start forgetting about her. As Riki finds Mio in the courtyard one day, she lends him her treasured poetry collection and invites him to accompany her to the beach. Midori, the girl who looks like Mio, shows up at the beach and exposes the fact that Mio has no shadow, the reason why she always carries a parasol. Upon learning this, Riki collapses from an attack of narcolepsy, but he wakes up back in his dorm room with no recollection from what happened at the beach. As Riki ponders what is missing in the course of life, he rediscovers Mio's poetry collection and rushes to the classroom in search for Mio. However, as Midori arrives, only Riki knows that she is not Mio. While Riki mulls over Mio's disappearance, Midori confronts Riki, but he refuses to address her as Mio like everyone else. Although Riki thinks that Midori may be Mio's forgotten shadow, Midori points out that she does not have a shadow either. Midori states that Riki will forget Mio before long.
14	"So Now, I'll Reach Out My Hand to You"; Transliteration: "Dakara Boku wa Kimi ni Te o Nobasu" (Japanese: だからぼくは君に手をのばす)	January 12, 2013	April 22, 2014
Despite his resolution never to forget about Mio, Riki is left unsure what memories are real when Midori tells him that Mio wore glasses. Riki is told by Kyousuke to never believe anyone's words but his own for Mio's sake. Riki suddenly remembers Mio planning to submit a tanka in the school's competition, discovering that the tanka was focused on their previous conversation about a paper airplane. After talking to Midori, Riki realizes that Mio is at the beach. Mio tells Riki that Midori was her imaginary little sister. After getting medical treatments, Mio eventually forgot about Midori, until reading a tanka by Bokusui Wakayama about a white bird drifting between the sky and ocean. After blacking out and waking up, she realized her shadow was gone. Mio refuses to come back with Riki and turns into a bird to fly away. Riki sobs over losing Mio, but is reinvigorated after receiving a call from Midori. He goes into the ocean and locates Mio, ultimately witnessing Mio and Midori becoming one person. Riki and Mio then find themselves back on the beach, where Mio has her shadow back. Returning back to school, they rejoin the rest of the Little Busters.
15	"Hell Yeah,This Totally Rocks!"; Transliteration: "Muhyossu, Saikō da ze" (Japanese: ムヒョッス、最高だぜ)	January 19, 2013	April 22, 2014
After an initial failed attempt by Komari and Kudryavka to get Riki to follow them because of something seemingly terrible, Rin later texts Riki to come alone to her dorm room. Riki sneaks into the girls' dormitory at night, only to find Rin, Komari, Yuiko, Haruka, Kudryavka and Mio together for a sleepover. Surmising that Riki has been abducted after briefly calling him, Kyousuke plays games with Masato and Kengo to determine who will go rescue Riki. After eating pastries, the girls take turns bathing until Riki is last. However, he is reluctant to learn that his pajamas were replaced by a girl's school uniform to wear. A-Chan drops by to tell all of them to keep the noise down if they do not want a visit from the disciplinary committee. Unfortunately, the disciplinary committee ultimately arrives to warn them for being loud when they roll up some newspapers and start a sword fight. Kanata luckily does not recognize Riki while he is cross-dressing. The next morning, Riki leaves after thanking Yuiko for helping Rin socialize with the other girls. Riki runs into Kyousuke, who had just won the right to go rescue him after playing games the whole night.
16	"Don't Look at Me Like That"; Transliteration: "Sonna Me de Minai de" (Japanese: そんな目で見ないで)	January 26, 2013	April 22, 2014
Masato battles Haruka after she eats some of his katsudon, but he quickly loses. Riki, Rin and Komari later watch as Haruka starts to repair a bench full with fond memories, but Kanata arrives to remind Haruka that the bench will be removed and replaced. Haruka watches as the disciplinary committee smashes the bench and takes the remains to be incinerated. She is brought to the disciplinary committee room to answer for her numerous infractions, but she loses her composure when the disciplinary committee accuses her of wrongdoing that she did not even commit. Yuiko intervenes and calms the situation before Haruka can make things worse for herself. While Riki and the girls clean up the disciplinary committee room, Riki wonders why Kanata is so harsh towards Haruka. The next day, flyers are posted all over school saying that Haruka's father is a criminal. The Little Busters collect all the flyers around the school until they finally find Haruka, cooped up in the baseball clubroom in tears. Each woman in her family line traditionally has two husbands, in which one of her mother's husbands was arrested for arson and attempted murder. It is revealed that Haruka and Kanata are twins.
17	"I Wanted Someone to Stay Beside Me"; Transliteration: "Dareka ni Soba ni Ite Hoshikattan da" (Japanese: 誰かにそばにいて欲しかったんだ)	February 2, 2013	April 22, 2014
Haruka and Kanata were born from two separate fathers. After Haruka's father Shō Saigusa was arrested for attempted murder, the Futaki family took control of the Saigusa family. The family ultimately chose Kanata to be heir, while Haruka was blamed for everything. This urged Haruka to make trouble for Kanata, causing Kanata to get scolded for not keeping Haruka in line. Her friends reassure Haruka that they would never abandon her despite now knowing the truth. Haruka regains her smile after baseball practice with her friends. Kanata soon warns Haruka not to involve her friends in any trouble. The next day, Haruka bakes chiffon cakes and gives some to Riki and Rin, but they come out bone dry. Riki and Rin then accompany Haruka to see Shō in order to confirm if he is her father, but he refuses to answer. Later that night, Riki tells Kanata that he wants to help Haruka just like he was helped in the past, but he apologizes for his arrogance. The following day, Haruka presents Riki with some chiffon cakes that she baked, surprisingly tastier than the last time. However, this was merely Kanata disguised as Haruka, who then shows up in shock.
18	"The Answer Is Within Your Heart"; Transliteration: "Kotae wa Kokoro no Naka ni Arun da" (Japanese: 答えは心のなかにあるんだ)	February 9, 2013	April 22, 2014
Haruka discovers that Kanata lied about having an egg allergy since childhood. After Kanata and Haruka each leave, Kudryavka tells Riki that Kanata is nice when inside her dorm room, despite her cold demeanor to others. Riki learns that Kanata was protecting Haruka from being hurt by using the egg allergy as a childhood lie, but Haruka finds it difficult not to shoulder all of her hate onto Kanata. Haruka is later convinced by Riki to talk to Kanata in order to learn the truth. Although reluctant, Kanata reveals to Haruka that she was always beaten or abused by the Futaki family if she ever went easy on Haruka, but she had to secure the heir of the Saigusa family and be hard on Haruka in order to protect their lives. Haruka reconciles with Kanata, realizing that they both are having a hard time. Haruka and Kanata decide to visit Shō, who tells them that their mother and other father tried to leave the family with Haruka and Kanata as babies. The Saigusa family took Haruka and Kanata back, prompting Shō to commit arson and attempted murder. Haruka chooses not to know who her real father is anymore.
19	"Keep Working Hard"; Transliteration: "Kitto, Zutto, Ganbaru no desu" (Japanese: きっと、ずっと、がんばるのです)	February 16, 2013	April 22, 2014
The Little Busters start a teamwork exercise for their morning practice. Later, Kudryavka decides to apply for the national practical exam in school, and the other members of the Little Busters agree to tutor her, especially in her weakest subject of English. Komari covers English, Mio covers math and physics and Masato covers Japanese history. When classmates Takamiya, Katsusawa and Yamazaki deride Kudryavka while in the cafeteria, Yuiko quickly scares them away. In the library, Kudryavka tells Riki, Masato and Yuiko that her grandfather raised her and took her on many travels, including a small island nation called Tebwa in Southeast Asia where she was born. Kanata comes by to give Kudryavka back her book on the many-worlds interpretation, one of many books she reads for international exams as a hobby. On the day of the national practical exam, Kudryavka accidentally fills in the wrong bubbles on her test, having to take a remedial class as a result. Kudryavka feels bad about failing after her friends helped her study so much, but the others members of the Little Busters show up in the remedial class to show her that she is not alone.
20	"Cure the Lovesick"; Transliteration: "Koiwazurai o Iyase" (Japanese: 恋わずらいをいやせ)	February 23, 2013	April 22, 2014
Riki and Rin receive a third mysterious letter tied to Lennon, telling them to cure the lovesickness of a second-year boy named Aikawa who surprisingly likes Sasami. Riki and Rin ask Sasami her hobbies and ideal type of guys, only to find out that Sasami likes Kengo, though he has no interest in her. Aikawa is shocked to hear Sasami likes Kengo, but Rin urges him to sing a hip-hop song to Sasami with some original lyrics to imply his love for her. Aikawa accidentally messes up the last line in the song, leading Rin to suggest a three-way attack on Kengo to get Sasami to fall for Aikawa. However, this backfires and Kengo ends up taking down Aikawa. Sasami arrives on the scene, impressed by Kengo's athleticism. Aikawa decides to give up, and Riki later realizes that they merely have to ease the pain of his unrequited love to fulfill the request. Rin goes to apologize to Sasami, who ultimately agrees to hand over her email address after sympathizing with what Aikawa is going through. Rin gives Sasami's email address to Aikawa, who thanks her for it.
21	"Fifty Nautical Miles Into the Sky"; Transliteration: "50 Nōtikaru Mairu no Sora" (Japanese: 50ノーティカルマイルの空)	March 2, 2013	April 22, 2014
After Rin amazes the others with her varied pitches during baseball practice, the Little Busters gather to clean up the clubroom. Kudryavka tells the others that her name comes from Laika, a Soviet space dog who became the first animal in space to orbit the Earth. Riki comes across Kudryavka later in the night and assists her with a traditional ritual called the Festival of Stars from her native country of Tebwa, which was once part of the Soviet Union. Kudryavka tells Riki about her mother Chernushka Ivanova Strugaskaya, who taught her about outer space. The next day in the cafeteria, after the news reports of a rocket launch from Tebwa will take place the following morning, Kudryavka reveals to her friends that Chernushka is an astronaut. On the day of the launch, Riki searches for Kudryavka to watch it on television with her. After Riki finds Kudryavka outside, she feels that it is better not to watch it as her own manner of wishing good luck, since she was raised by her grandfather during childhood. Riki and Kudryavka later learn that the rocket exploded on launch, and that the mission control center has lost contact with Chernushka.
22	"I Promise I'll Come Back"; Transliteration: "Watashi, Kanarazu Modotte Kimasu" (Japanese: わたし、必ず戻ってきます)	March 9, 2013	April 22, 2014
The news only reports the rocket launch failure in Tebwa, giving no updates as to whether or not Chernushka is safe. While other members of the Little Busters worry for Kudryavka, they read from the newspaper that entry into and departure from Tebwa is restricted in order to reduce risk of contamination from the exploded rocket engine. However, Kanata informs them that the Tebwan embassy has delivered a plane ticket to Kudryavka, granting her an opportunity to see Chernushka again. Kudryavka is conflicted about going back to Tebwa because she originally came to Japan in order to escape having dropped out of the Tebwan aviation school after six months. Initially, Kudryavka decides to stay and throws away all of her astronaut memorabilia, but Riki recovers the items and brings them back to her. Riki tells Kudryavka that she can just be herself in chasing her dream of outer space, even if she cannot become an astronaut. Kudryavka admits that she wanted to see Chernushka again and decides to go back to Tebwa. Before departing, Kudryavka leaves Strelka and Belka in the care of Rin and says a heartfelt goodbye to her friends.
23	"For Those You Love"; Transliteration: "Anata no Taisetsu na Mono no Tame ni" (Japanese: あなたの大切なもののために)	March 16, 2013	April 22, 2014
As her friends in Japan learn that several riots started in Tebwa following the rocket launch failure, Kudryavka meets up with her grandfather who is in hiding, and she learns that Chernushka survived the explosion. After Kudryavka's grandfather leaves to pick up Chernushka, Kudryavka is soon captured by the rioting rebels and shackled inside a cave. As Kudryavka's friends continue to wish for her safe return, Riki holds on to a broken gear that Kudryavka left behind, a memento from her mother. While Kudryavka is determined to free herself, the broken gear mysteriously appears in Kudryavka's hand, using it to break the chains. Some time later, the riots have quelled and Kudryavka reunites with Chernushka for awhile, before she returns to Japan and happily rejoins her friends.
24	"If Rinnie Is Happy, I'm Happy, Too"; Transliteration: "Rin-chan ga Shiawase nara Watashi mo Shiawase dakara" (Japanese: 鈴ちゃんが幸せならわたしも幸せだから)	March 23, 2013	April 22, 2014
While at the riverbank, Riki and Rin receive a fourth mysterious letter tied to Lennon, which says to put on a puppet show. They soon overhear five kids having an argument, in which a girl named Yumi planned to put on a puppet show for her friend Ami, but the panda doll was damaged by the three boys named Tarō, Jirō and Saburō when they were playing baseball. Eager to clear the task, Rin promises to put on a puppet show for the kids the next day. Rin initially gets help from the rest of the Little Busters to write an approved script, but this is interrupted when curfew is called by Kanata, who sends all of them back to their dorm rooms. Komari secretly visits Rin's dorm room to finish preparations until morning. At the riverbank, Rin puts on a puppet show for Riki and the five kids for their enjoyment. Rin eventually finds Komari on the school roof, where Komari reveals that she was wishing on a night's first star for Rin's success. The two star-shaped ornaments in Komari's hair are also like stars that may grant wishes, one for her own wishes and one for Rin's wishes.
25	"The Final Member"; Transliteration: "Saigo no Hitori" (Japanese: 最後のひとり)	March 30, 2013	April 22, 2014
Kyousuke tells the other members of the Little Busters that their first baseball game will be against a team composed of captains from other sports clubs. However, with only eight playable members minus Mio, Kyousuke still needs a final member for the baseball team. Riki, Rin and Masato later spot Kengo talking with Miyuki Koshiki, a former member of the archery club who was forced to quit after she lost an eye during an accident. Masato brings this up during lunch, brewing speculation from others about their relationship, but Miyuki points out that she was just asking him for advice. Riki, Masato and Kyousuke later find out that Miyuki has gone up to the edge of the school roof, where three teachers try to dissuade her. Miyuki slips and falls in the commotion, but is rescued in the nick of time by Kengo, who unfortunately fractures his left arm and is suspended from the kendo club for a semester. Deciding to join the Little Busters baseball team, Kengo manages to hit a home run with one arm after several attempts. With the baseball team complete, Kyousuke transfers his leadership role onto Riki.
26	"The Greatest of Friends"; Transliteration: "Saikō no Nakamatachi" (Japanese: 最高の仲間たち)	April 6, 2013	April 22, 2014
Kengo shows a new enthusiasm about now being on the baseball team, much to everyone's surprise. The rest of the baseball team congratulate Riki on being their new leader. Kyousuke reminds Riki to take care of the batting order, fielding position and strategy for the baseball game against the All Stars. Kyousuke gives him advice, telling him that he needs to surpass him and become stronger. Riki finds it difficult to plan out everything for the baseball game, but he gets encouragement from Haruka and Mio in the baseball clubroom, then Komari, Kudryavka and Yuiko on the school roof. After Riki finishes the planning for the baseball game, he tells Kyousuke that he will grow stronger. The Little Busters end up losing the baseball game against the All Stars by eight runs, though the whole experience and the bonds they share are more important for them. They then decide to take a commemorative photo of the whole baseball team.
OVA	"I Will Protect the World of Saito!"; Transliteration: "Sekai no Saitō wa Ore ga Mamoru!" (Japanese: 世界の斉藤は俺が守る!)	August 28, 2013	N/A
Kyousuke implements a battle ranking system within the Little Busters. Riki slowly moves up the ranks, while Yuiko has fun teasing the other girls by giving them dubious advice. Meanwhile, a mysterious fighter known as Mask the Saito appears and starts defeating other members of the Little Busters and moving to the top of the rankings. Mask the Saito then confronts Riki in a battle, but he is stopped by Komari reciting a moving story and admits defeat, revealing himself to be Kyousuke, who passes the tribal mask onto Riki in celebration.

== Little Busters! Refrain ==
No.	Title	Original release date	English release date
1	"It Struck Without Warning"; Transliteration: "Sore wa Totsuzen Yatte Kita" (Japanese: それは突然やってきた)	October 5, 2013	January 20, 2015
Following the loss of their first baseball game, the Little Busters have a pancake party. While returning from the pancake party, Yuiko Kurugaya overhears Takamiya and Katsusawa gossiping to Mutsumi Suginami over a humiliating encounter with Yuiko in the past. In the baseball clubroom, the rest of the Little Busters later learn from Kudryavka Noumi that her bag was filled with thumbtacks, and from Komari Kamikita that her notes were torn inside her bag. Riki Naoe suspiciously follows Mutsumi, who was overhearing them, all the way into a classroom, soon realizing that the culprits are Takamiya and Katsusawa. Yuiko suddenly appears, playing back a recorded conversation between them that proves their involvement, thereby having evidence against them. When Takamiya threatens to torment Yuiko's friends, Yuiko destroys the classroom door with a single kick and instills fear on their faces, forcing Takamiya, Katsusawa and Mutsumi to give up and run away. When teacher Endō arrives and discovers the damage, Masato Inohara and Kengo Miyazawa pretend to bar fight as a distraction, while Riki and Yuiko escape to the broadcast room. However, Riki collapses from an attack of narcolepsy after feeling a sense of déjà vu while inside the broadcast room.
2	"It Was Raining Back Then, Too"; Transliteration: "Sono Toki mo Ame ga Futte Ita" (Japanese: そのときも雨が降っていた)	October 12, 2013	January 20, 2015
After waking up, Riki learns that Yuiko was taking care of him during his sleep, but he cannot shake the suspicion that he had the same conversation with her in the broadcast room on a rainy day in the past. Later during a card game in Riki's dorm room, Kyousuke Natsume suspects Riki of being in love with Yuiko, seeing that Riki is seemingly distracted. While Masato and Kengo are eager to stir up this romance, Rin Natsume leaves in disinterest. The plan is to lure the girls to the school, while the boys prepare a fireworks show, giving Riki the opportunity to be alone with Yuiko to confess his love for her. The plan backfires when Riki is unable to lure the girls to the school, but he ends up alone with Yuiko by accident when the fireworks show begins. When Riki drops his cellphone and a text message from Kyousuke asks him if he confessed, Yuiko reads it and asks if Riki has ever fallen in love before, but Riki speechlessly stares at her beauty. The following day, Riki realizes that the events of the previous day are beginning to be repeated, including the date of June 20th.
3	"I Wanted To Stay Here Forever"; Transliteration: "Zutto Koko ni Itakatta" (Japanese: ずっとここにいたかった)	October 19, 2013	January 20, 2015
The events of June 20th continue to repeat each day without anyone taking heed of it, except for Riki himself. Although, no one else finds it strange when it starts to snow endlessly. Riki decides to look for Kyousuke to ask for his advice, but he is nowhere to be found. However, Riki learns that Yuiko is the only other person who knows the truth, and she claims that it is all her fault. Her wish for staying with the Little Busters forever had been granted in the form of a dream, and she tells Riki that she only knew what happiness was until joining the Little Busters. Yuiko tells him that things will return to normal when he wakes up from the dream, but Riki will forget everything that happened. Before bidding farewell, Yuiko warns Riki to protect Rin, as the "fated day" is at hand.
4	"Riki and Rin"; Transliteration: "Riki to Rin" (Japanese: 理樹と鈴)	October 26, 2013	January 20, 2015
While thinking about the last words that Yuiko told him in the dream, Riki is approached by Mutsumi, who confesses her feelings but flees after she claims that he already likes someone else. In the baseball clubroom, Riki begins thinking of Rin all of a sudden. Kyousuke suddenly reveals that a third-year student had also confessed to Rin, and Kyousuke helped her decline the student. Later that day, Rin asks Riki to help her carry some cat food from the pet store. On the way back, Rin suggests that they start dating, and Riki agrees after confirming that she likes him. Riki has trouble telling Kyousuke about it the next day, but Kyousuke claims that he already knew about it. Riki and Rin later tell the rest of the Little Busters, who congratulate them. However, when Kyousuke mentions that Riki and Rin are not sitting together, Rin runs away embarrassed, prompting Riki to chase after her. Riki and Rin receive the final mysterious letter tied to Lennon, which says, "In homeroom, volunteer yourselves."
5	"The Final Task"; Transliteration: "Saigo no Kadai" (Japanese: 最後の課題)	November 2, 2013	January 20, 2015
As members of the Prefectural Assembly are expected to make a school inspection, Riki and Rin volunteer themselves as tour guides as part of the "final task". Despite Rin's shy demeanor, she manages to guide them properly with Riki. Rin is later invited to take part in a student exchange program to help the students of another school overcome a field trip tragedy. Riki wants Rin to decline the invitation, but he later realizes that this could be an opportunity for her to mature. However, when Riki tries to encourage her to take part in the student exchange program, she gets angry at him for his change of heart and ultimately accepts the invitation. On the eve of Rin's departure, Riki realizes that Rin grew more optimistic after clearing each task. After following Lennon into the woods, Riki concludes that Kyousuke planned all of this, including the assembly of girls to become a part of their baseball team. Riki confronts Kyousuke about the "secret to this world" mentioned in the mysterious letters, but they are forced to run away after being caught outdoors during curfew. When Riki trips over a tree root, Kyousuke disappears in front of him.
6	"After The Escape"; Transliteration: "Tōbō no Hate ni" (Japanese: 逃亡の果てに)	November 9, 2013	January 20, 2015
Rin leaves the school in front of her friends without saying a word. Talking to Kengo, Riki is left with the impression that Kyousuke sent Rin away in hopes of disbanding the Little Busters. Riki continues getting text messages from Rin saying that she does not know what to do at her school, but all he can reply to her is "hang in there" and "keep trying". Concerned for Rin's isolation, Riki decides to go see her. Riki is stopped by Kyousuke, who negotiates that he can bring her only for weekends. On the following weekend, Rin comes back to see Riki, but she stays in bed overly depressed. Riki and Kengo later challenge Kyousuke and Masato to a home run match during a downpour in order to settle whether or not Rin continues the student exchange program. However, Kengo punches Kyousuke, claiming that the home run match was rigged, before being restrained by Riki and Masato. The next morning, Riki tells Rin that they are running away together. They travel to a cottage where they played as kids, but Riki realizes that he is too weak to protect Rin. They are eventually discovered and raided by the police.
7	"May 13th" Transliteration: "Gogatsu Jū-san-nichi" (Japanese: 5月13日)	November 16, 2013	January 20, 2015
Riki awakens a few months before, seemingly with no memories about what happened during that time. He runs to stop Masato and Kengo from fighting, but neither of them listen to Riki. Worse yet, Kyousuke is nowhere to be found. The fight results in Kengo fracturing his right arm, putting him out of commission for kendo practice. Kengo asks Riki to think of something fun all of them could do together. Rin is now afraid of other people except Riki, who routinely drops her off at a local elementary school during the day. Meanwhile, a depressed Kyousuke stays cooped up in his dorm room reading manga. Initially unsuccessful to find something that Rin enjoys doing, Riki eventually discovers her affinity for playing catch. Riki tries to invite Kyousuke to join in, but he refuses. Riki also invites Masato and Kengo to play a baseball game, but Kengo angrily refuses to participate and Masato leaves shortly thereafter. Knowing the others are hiding something from him and Rin, Riki resolves to become a leader like Kyousuke and reform the Little Busters.
8	"Proof of the Strongest"; Transliteration: "Saikyō no Shōmei" (Japanese: 最強の証明)	November 23, 2013	January 20, 2015
Riki attempts to invite Masato back into the Little Busters, but Masato refuses the offer and claims that he is the strongest. Soon after, Riki and Rin are informed by the nurse that Masato attacked five male students, prompting the two to devise a trap near the campus sculpture to end his rampage. However, this trap fails to restrain Masato fully, and he starts pursuing Riki and Rin. After Rin uses a net as another trap by means of a distraction, Riki manages to wear down Masato until defeating him barehanded. Masato reminsces that he used to be treated as a fool by his peers until he trained his body enough to beat down whoever insulted him, resulting in his isolation during childhood. Masato began his rampage at high school because he suddenly started seeing everyone else as a reflection of himself, believing that he could only distinguish himself among them by becoming the strongest. During childhood, Masato was defeated by Kyousuke also by use of traps like firecrackers and a mailbox, leading to their friendship. After renewing his friendship with Masato, Riki realizes that he must eventually confront Kyousuke, while a serious Kengo watches over Riki from afar.
9	"A Friend's Tears"; Transliteration: "Tomo no Namida" (Japanese: 親友の涙)	November 30, 2013	January 20, 2015
Riki learns from Masato that Kengo originally joined the Little Busters after Kyousuke defeated Kengo's father in a kendo match. When Riki tries to convince Kengo to rejoin the Little Busters, Kengo claims that it is pointless to convince him. After Riki visits Kyousuke, who hints that Kengo is lying about something, Riki realizes that Kengo's right arm is not injured as he claims. Riki and Masato encourage Riki to challenge Kengo to a home run match under the condition that Kengo rejoins the Little Busters if Riki wins. After two strikes and many fouls, Riki manages to land a home run. Rin takes Riki's place due to his exhaustion. However, Rin's pitches are fast but lack control. When she manages to pitch the baseball properly, she succeeds in striking out Kengo, thereby winning the home run match. A flashback shows when Kengo was defeated by Kyousuke in a kendo match before joining the Little Busters. Kengo rejoins the Little Busters, determined to follow Riki as long as he can.
10	"And Now, I Repeat It All"; Transliteration: "Soshite Ore wa Kurikaesu" (Japanese: そして俺は繰り返す)	December 7, 2013	January 20, 2015
Having assembled the rest of the original Little Busters, Riki intends to save Kyousuke from despair. Meanwhile, Kyousuke reminisces by the fact that he created an artificial world using his spirit with the purpose of preparing both Riki and Rin to live by themselves, in which Kyousuke already planned the current events in motion. Since then, Kyousuke created an alternate timeline that was always reset when Riki or Rin had fallen into despair. However, Kyousuke's power to maintain this realm has been waning, leading to the strange events occurring in the previous loop and the departure of the additional girls who joined the Little Busters. When Riki and Rin ran away after the latter broke down from being separated from the others, Kyousuke was losing his faith, until Riki managed to establish himself as the leader. Once reunited with his friends, Kyousuke claims that the time for him and the others to bid farewell to Riki and Rin has come.
11	"The End of the World"; Transliteration: "Sekai no Owari" (Japanese: 世界の終わり)	December 14, 2013	January 20, 2015
After having the Little Busters once again reunited, Riki suggests for them to play baseball, and the others accept. Kyousuke takes one last look at the baseball field as he values how each of the members made an impact in his life. Kyousuke reveals to Riki that they are currently in an artificial world created by him and the others after the field trip tragedy, in which only Riki and Rin survived this bus accident. Kyousuke explains that this artificial world was meant to prepare Riki and Rin to move forward with their lives, so Kyousuke and the others gave the duo a series of trials to have them mature and become stronger. Also during the baseball game, Masato and Kengo each bid their farewells and suddenly vanish after they each confirm their friendship with Riki. After Riki hits a home run, Kyousuke tearfully instructs Riki to take Rin past the school gates back to the real world, as the time for them to part has come. As Riki and Rin run past the school gates, Kyousuke has one last tour around the school before sitting at his desk and disappearing along with the artificial world.
12	"One Wish"; Transliteration: "Onegaigoto Hitotsu" (Japanese: お願いごとひとつ)	December 21, 2013	January 20, 2015
Riki and Rin awaken in the real world and it is recalled that a bus accident occurred during their field trip, in which Masato and Kengo used their bodies to protect them. Despite being injured, they flee from the site of the bus accident to avoid being caught in the impending explosion, but after reaching a safe distance, Riki leaves Rin behind to return and attempt to help the others. However, he starts suffering another attack of narcolepsy and struggles to keep himself awake. Meanwhile, Rin reminisces about when Kyousuke started the Little Busters during childhood to help her overcome her shyness. Rin has encounters with Komari, Mio Nishizono, Haruka Saigusa, Yuiko and Kudryavka in spirit, overwhelming Riki with tears since they each taught her the value of friendship. Leaving behind one of her star-shaped ornaments, Komari wishes for Rin to be able to smile always. Rin decides to look for a way to save her friends as well.
13	"Little Busters"; Transliteration: "Ritoru Basutāzu" (Japanese: リトルバスターズ)	December 28, 2013	January 20, 2015
During his collapse from an attack of narcolepsy, Riki realizes that he always falls asleep at the sight of unpleasant situations, starting when he saw his parents' dead bodies in a car accident when he was a child. Determined to overcome this weakness, Riki awakens with Rin's help. Knowing that the bus will explode, Riki and Rin start rescuing the other students from the wreckage, only to discover that Kyousuke is using his own body to prevent the gas from leaking further. This leaves the duo no other option but to pick him up after carrying all the others to safety. The bus explodes just after Riki and Rin return to rescue Kyousuke, but the incident ends with no deaths. Three months later, all of the students have returned from the hospital except a comatose Kyousuke, and the other Little Busters spend their days together, waiting for him to return. Once Kyousuke finally returns, the Little Busters have their own private field trip to the beach together.

== Little Busters! EX ==
No.	Title	Original release date	English release date
1	"Agent Saya Tokido"; Transliteration: "Chōhōin Tokido Saya" (Japanese: 諜報員 朱鷺戸沙耶)	January 29, 2014	December 6, 2016
While Riki Naoe goes to the classroom to pick up a Japanese lit notebook at nighttime, he is approached by Saya Tokido, who urges him to flee. After he hears a distant gunshot, he finds her abandoned student handbook left in the classroom. On the next day, Riki returns the student handbook back to Saya, who invites him on the school roof. She claims that the "Darkness Executives" may capture and interrogate him and may discover her identity. When Saya pushes Riki off the school roof, Masato Inohara appears outside below. Riki faithfully lets go of the ledge and has Masato catch him. Soon inquiring Kyousuke Natsume about the Darkness Executives, Riki is warned not to get involved with them. After Kengo Miyazawa saves Riki from a noose, Riki later escapes an overhead power line conducted by saltwater balloons. Saya finds Riki interesting for dodging her traps and enlists his help instead, revealing that her mission is to locate a "secret treasure" inside the school. Spotting a mysterious contraption inside a classroom, Riki and Saya manage to activate it and a secret entrance is revealed. They flee into the secret entrance before being chased by the Darkness Executives.
2	"In the Dungeon"; Transliteration: "Meikyū no Futari" (Japanese: 迷宮の二人)	February 26, 2014	December 6, 2016
After venturing into three basements of the underground dungeon full of booby traps, Riki and Saya decide that they must first stock up on water, food and supplies for the expedition. On the next day, Riki meets up with Saya at the shopping district after school. While shopping around, Saya is excited when playing a claw crane, which sparks Riki's interest. They return to the mission back in the underground dungeon on the fourth basement, where Riki has the feeling that he has met Saya sometime in the past. While trying to find a downward staircase, Riki and Saya are soon attacked by the Darkness Executives. After Riki activates the downward staircase and covers for Saya, they manage to escape into a room, which contains a hot bath. Saya awkwardly undresses and gets into the bath to relax, much to Riki's anxiety. After she gets dressed again, they decide to have a picnic together. Riki suddenly realizes deep in his heart that he fell in love with Saya some time ago.
3	"The Darkness Executives"; Transliteration: "Yami no Shikkō-bu" (Japanese: 闇の執行部)	March 26, 2014	December 6, 2016
Riki and Saya continue to the fifth basement after working together to pull a lever hidden in the ceiling. After they encounter a moving statue, Saya uses a sword that Riki found to destroy the statue. Saya sprains her ankle, and Riki carries her out, much to her embarrassment. Due to this, Saya decides to confess her feelings to Riki while trying to get a kiss from him. Although Riki is initially caught off guard, he then tells her to close her eyes, answering her confession back with the kiss that she wanted. As they bypass more obstacles and reach the sixth basement, Saya wishes that the secret treasure turns out to be a time machine so she can meet Riki all over again. She asks him out on a date if the mission ended successfully, which he promises back. They encounter Shun Tokikaze, the director of the Darkness Executives, before Saya faces Shun alone in a battle. However, after she dies, a screen displays "game over". This game restarts, claiming it to be her 99th or 100th time, and the whole journey repeats with her asking Riki to run down the school hallway.
4	"Someday, Somewhere..."; Transliteration: "Itsuka, Doko ka de…" (Japanese: いつか、どこかで…)	April 23, 2014	December 6, 2016
Saya's father worked oversea as a doctor, and Saya traveled with him, reading a treasured manga. When she returned to her hometown, she met Riki and played soccer with him until it started to rain. On the way home, a mudflow seemingly killed Saya, but not long before she entered the artificial world that Kyousuke created. She died in every scenario of the game, thus making Kyousuke repeatedly "wind back the clock". After a few more attempts of reaching the sixth basement, Saya uses Riki as a decoy in order to defeat Shun. Riki and Saya take an elevator to the sixtieth basement. Once arriving, Saya locks herself in a glass case, revealing that the secret treasure is a biological weapon. After Riki reminisces about his time spent with Saya, he witnesses her shooting herself in the head. After Riki wakes up, Kyousuke tells him that the Darkness Executives "jumped the gun" and that the secret treasure really was a time machine. Saya wakes up as a child and survived the mudflow. She tells her father about the dream that she had. When she recovers, she goes outside to play with Riki as a child.
5	"Sasami Becomes a Cat"; Transliteration: "Sasami, Neko ni Naru" (Japanese: 佐々美、猫になる)	May 27, 2014	December 6, 2016
Riki and Rin Natsume spot Sasami Sasasegawa playing with a black cat in the school hallway, but Sasami runs away after she is embarrassed by her secret of being friends with Komari Kamikita. After Riki wakes up from a nap and buys coffee, the black cat strangely follows him back inside his dorm room. During their brief visit, Kudryavka Noumi shares muscle milk with Masato while Mio Nishizono notices something odd about the black cat. At nighttime, Sasami magically appears in front of Riki and Masato, revealing herself as the black cat, but she cannot control her transformations. Although Riki can understand Sasami as a cat, he deduces that she can only transform back and forth near him, so Masato has to leave the dorm room temporarily. Things do not go well when Riki tries contacting Komari to explain the current situation, though Riki and Sasami manage to work things out on their own. The next day, Sasami feels secluded because she is treated like an actual cat. However, Komari is the only one who believes Sasami. The following day, while Riki suspects that they are in a parallel world, he is informed by Rin that Komari has gone missing.
6	"A Small World Someone Wished For"; Transliteration: "Dareka ga Negatta Chiisa na Sekai" (Japanese: 誰かが願った小さな世界)	June 24, 2014	December 6, 2016
Sasami is forced to believe Riki's theory that the parallel world was created by someone else's desire. After Riki suspects Rin's absence in the classroom, he later hides the current situation from Kengo. Riki tastes Sasami's stir fried beef and pepper for lunch upon returning to his dorm room. As Riki notices that Sasami is wearing a cat apron, she reveals that she had a pet black cat during childhood before moving away. Riki believes that if Sasami talked to Kengo about her current condition, she might change back to normal. The next day, Riki and Sasami reveal the truth to Kengo, only for him to suddenly vanish right in front of them. Riki and Sasami see the streets past the school gates are formless, realizing that the parallel world is fading. However, since Sasami is still a cat, Riki advises her to stay by his side. After waking up from a dream, Riki realizes that the black cat Kuro created the parallel world because it represents the last few moments of its life before it died. Riki eventually convinces Sasami to talk to Kuro's spirit as a team, which finally reveals its physical form, much to Sasami's happiness.
7	"Kanata's Secret"; Transliteration: "Kanata no Himitsu" (Japanese: 佳奈多の秘密)	July 30, 2014	December 6, 2016
After the Little Busters compete in a kick the can tournament, Kanata Futaki arrives and orders Haruka Saigusa to pick up cans after school. Kyousuke later tells Riki that they may lose the baseball clubroom, but there may be a diplomatic solution in keeping it. While in A-Chan's office, Riki helps Kanata with pulling out files of student dropouts to be shredded. After Riki and Kanata install a new bulletin board, Kanata admits that she likes to watch wild crowds even though she is not used to being around them. While waiting an hour for a spare key at a locksmith, they decide to stop at a restaurant to eat a hamburger. Kanata later confronts members of the cooking club, in which a fire accident prompted her to remove her blazer to stop the oven flame. However, the ceiling sprinklers revealed her body scars, causing her to run away from witnessing students and vomit in the courtyard.
8	"Our Bond"; Transliteration: "Bokutachi no Kizuna" (Japanese: 僕たちの絆)	July 30, 2014	December 6, 2016
Both Riki and Haruka find Kanata in the courtyard, but Kanata tells them to go away. Haruka begins hearing rumors from her classmates that Kanata was abused. Kyousuke tells his friends that the baseball clubroom is saved, thanks to Kanaka. Riki and Haruka soon learn that Kanata is marrying a Saigusa to protect Haruka. After talking to Kengo when she practices kendo outside, Kanata recalls as a child when she chose to be the heir of the Saigusa family to prevent Haruka from being abused any longer. After Kanata wakes up in the infirmary, she tells Riki and Haruka that she is not worth saving, using one hand and a cliff as an analogy. Before departing, Riki and Haruka console Kanata, telling her that they will never abandon her. However, Kanata is soon taken to the Futaki household to get married, prompting the Little Busters to take action. Once arriving at the Futaki household, the Little Busters create a series of diversions to help Kanata escape, despite Kanata's doubtfulness in this ploy. Kanata finally understands when Riki points out that many hands joined together to help her, which then strengthens the bond between Haruka and Kanata.
