= Kud Wafter =

2010 visual novel by Key

- Cover featuring heroine Kudryavka Noumi
- Developer: Key
- Publishers: Visual Arts (Windows, BD); Prototype (PSP, PS Vita)
- Director: Kai
- Artists: Na-Ga; Itaru Hinoue
- Writer: Chika Shirokiri
- Composer: Jun'ichi Shimizu
- Series: Little Busters!
- Platforms: Microsoft Windows, Android, Blu-ray Disc, PlayStation Portable, PlayStation Vita
- Release: June 25, 2010: Windows; JP: June 25, 2010; JP: June 28, 2013 (all ages) Android; JP: January 31, 2013 Blu-ray Disc; JP: March 29, 2013 PlayStation Portable; JP: May 9, 2013 PlayStation Vita; JP: December 19, 2013
- Genres: Eroge (Note: Only the original Windows, Android, and Blu-ray Disc releases have adult content.); visual novel
- Mode: Single-player

Kud Wafter (クドわふたー, Kudo Wafutā) is a Japanese adult visual novel developed by Key, released on June 25, 2010, for Windows. Kud Wafter is Key's eighth game, along with other titles such as Kanon, Air, and Clannad. Key released a version of Kud Wafter without the erotic content, and the game was ported to the PlayStation Portable and PlayStation Vita. The story follows the lives of high school students Riki Naoe and his close friend Kudryavka Noumi as they start to see more of each other in a romantic relationship. The gameplay in Kud Wafter follows a branching plot line which offers pre-determined scenarios with courses of interaction, and focuses on the appeal of the title character Kudryavka, also known as "Kud" (クド, Kudo) for short.

The game is a spin-off of Key's earlier game Little Busters! rated for all ages, and its expanded, adult version Little Busters! Ecstasy. Kudryavka is a heroine in both Little Busters! and Ecstasy. Kud Wafter is an expansion of Kudryavka's story after the events of Ecstasy and is written by Chika Shirokiri. Na-Ga and Itaru Hinoue returned as co-art directors. The game ranked as the best-selling PC game in Japan at its release. A manga adaptation illustrated by Bakutendō was serialized in ASCII Media Works' Dengeki G's Magazine. A 51-minute theatrical anime adaptation by J.C.Staff premiered on July 16, 2021.

== Gameplay ==
Text in Kud Wafter is displayed in a dialog box, here depicting the player character talking with Kudryavka.

Kud Wafter is a romance visual novel in which the player assumes the role of Riki Naoe. Much of its gameplay is spent on reading the story's narrative and dialogue. Kud Wafter follows a branching plot line with multiple endings; depending on the decisions that the player makes during the game, the plot will progress in a specific direction. Throughout gameplay, the player is given multiple options, and text progression pauses at these points until a choice is made. To view all plot lines, the player has to replay the game multiple times and make different choices to bring the plot in an alternate direction. Throughout gameplay, there are scenes with sexual CGs depicting Riki and Kudryavka having sex. Key released a version of Kud Wafter without the erotic content.

== Plot and characters ==
Kud Wafter's story revolves around Riki Naoe (直枝 理樹, Naoe Riki; voiced by: Tomoe Tamiyasu (epilogue only)), the male protagonist from Little Busters! and Little Busters! Ecstasy, and Kudryavka Noumi (能美 クドリャフカ, Nōmi Kudoryafuka; voiced by: Miyako Suzuta), one of the main heroines of the same games and the title character of Kud Wafter. Kudryavka has her story expanded upon than what was seen in Ecstasy, which was itself an expansion on the story featured in Little Busters!. Kud Wafter begins at the onset of the summer vacation after the events of the peaceful field trip from Little Busters!. The other members of the Little Busters have returned home for the break, leaving Riki and Kudryavka to spend their vacation living at the school dormitories as they form a romantic relationship. However, the male dormitory is undergoing renovations due to a problem with the plumbing, leaving Riki without a place to stay. As Kudryavka has no roommate, she suggests to Riki that he live with her until the renovation on the male dormitory is finished, and Riki accepts. Riki and Kudryavka try to keep the other dorm members from finding out since it is against the rules for a boy and a girl to share a room.

Also living at the dorms is a girl named Yuuki Himuro (氷室 憂希, Himuro Yūki; voiced by: Kumiko Okukawa) whom Kudryavka knew and was roommates with for a time in Kudryavka's home country; Yuuki is half Japanese, a quarter German, and a quarter Russian. She is the president of the science club at the school and came to take part in a cultural exchange program. Every day, Yuuki is absorbed in various strange research projects and experiments, and could be described as a logical genius. The head of the girl's dormitory is Kanata Futaki (二木 佳奈多, Futaki Kanata; voiced by: Keiko Suzuki), the only main character other than Riki and Kudryavka to return from Little Busters!. While Kanata is good friends with Kudryavka, she is concerned about Kudryavka's relationship with Riki. Kanata succeeded the previous head of the girl's dormitory, a third-year girl referred to as "A-chan" (あーちゃん; voiced by: Rita). Since she resigned from being the dormitory head, the dormitory rules have become somewhat more relaxed, but she still aides Kanata because Kanata inherited the position. A-chan is the president of the home economics club, which Kudryavka is a member of, and she likes interesting and strange things.

A young girl named Shiina Arizuki (有月 椎菜, Arizuki Shiina; voiced by: Nana Ayase) is aiming to win a water rocket competition, and she becomes friends with Kudryavka and Riki while searching for a suitable plastic bottle. Shiina is a cheerful, energetic girl without a hint of shyness around strangers. Shiina has a Welsh Corgi named Ōsumi as a pet. Her dream is to become an astronaut, but her family is against it. Her mother is a picture book author, and she has an older sister, Ui Arizuki (有月 初, Arizuki Ui; voiced by: Asari), a second-year high school student who also stays at the dormitory, even though her house is close to the school. Ui is a realist who does not believe in achieving dreams. She is frugal with her money and works part-time at a family restaurant. Ui used to play lacrosse, but had to stop due to an injury.

== Development and release ==
After the release of Little Busters! Ecstasy in 2008, Key decided to produce a spin-off of that game, which focused on the heroine Kudryavka Noumi. The project's planning was headed by Kai, who returned to Key after he last contributed to the scenario of Clannad released in 2004. Chika Shirokiri returned after his work on Little Busters!, in which he wrote the scenario for Kudryavka. The artists Na-Ga and Itaru Hinoue were the art directors and character designers, both of whom previously worked on Little Busters! for Key. Jun'ichi Shimizu composed the game's music and was supervised by Jun Maeda.

Kud Wafter was released in Japan on June 25, 2010, as a limited-edition version for Windows as a DVD. As a bonus, it came bundled with the visual novel's original soundtrack and a game demo of Key's ninth game Rewrite. Takahiro Baba, the president of VisualArt's, the publisher of Kud Wafter, announced via his Twitter account in April 2010 that 100,000 copies of Kud Wafter would be produced in its initial release. To advertise Kud Wafter, Good Smile Racing took Shinji Orito's 2003 Honda Fit and made it into an itasha (a car featuring illustrations of anime-styled characters) with images of Kudryavka. The car was driven around and showcased throughout Japan between April 19 and June 26, 2010. The car was put onto the Japanese Yahoo Auctions website on June 25, 2010, and sold for 1,699,000 yen after starting the auction at 1 yen.

An adult version playable on Android devices was released on January 31, 2013. A fully voiced version playable as a Blu-ray Disc was released on March 29, 2013, by Asoberu! BD-Game, a brand of VisualArt's. Prototype released a PlayStation Portable (PSP) port of the game titled Kud Wafter Converted Edition on May 9, 2013, which contains additional story events and visuals. Key released an all ages version on June 28, 2013, for Windows, and it contains the additional content in the PSP version. Prototype released a version of Kud Wafter Converted Edition ported to the PlayStation Vita (PS Vita) on December 19, 2013.

== Adaptations ==
- Kud Wafter

クドわふたー (Kudo Wafutā)
- Genre: Drama, Romance
- Manga
- Written by: Key
- Illustrated by: Bakutendō
- Published by: ASCII Media Works
- Magazine: Dengeki G's Magazine
- Original run: May 2010 – February 2014
- Volumes: 6
- Anime film
- Directed by: Kentarō Suzuki
- Written by: Kai
- Studio: J.C.Staff
- Released: July 16, 2021
- Runtime: 51 minutes

=== Print ===
A manga adaptation, illustrated by manga artist Bakutendō and titled Kud Wafter, was serialized between the May 2010 and February 2014 issues of ASCII Media Works' Dengeki G's Magazine. Six tankōbon volumes of the manga were released between February 26, 2011, and March 27, 2014. Two volumes of a manga anthology titled Kud Wafter Comic Anthology were released by Ichijinsha between August and October 2010. An anthology of a collection of four-panel comic strips titled Kud Wafter 4-koma Maximum was released by Wedge Holdings in September 2010. Harvest published Kud Wafter Anthology Comic in November 2010. Taibundo released a manga anthology titled Kud Wafter as the first volume in their Earth Star Comics line in December 2010. Paradigm released a novel anthology titled Kud Wafter Anthology: It's Kud Wafter! in September 2010. Harvest published a novel anthology titled Kud Wafter Anthology Novel in November 2010. ASCII Media Works published an art book titled White Fairy: Kudryavka Noumi Photo Album (White Fairy―能美クドリャフカ写真集) on March 10, 2011.

=== Anime ===
Key's parent company VisualArt's announced they were putting together a production committee for a possible anime adaptation in January 2017. VisualArt's launched a crowdfunding campaign on July 18, 2017, to fund the anime adaptation, and it reached its goal of ¥30 million in three days. The campaign reached its final stretch goal of ¥60 million to produce a 51-minute theatrical anime originally scheduled to premiere in September 2019 to be directed by Yoshinobu Yamakawa at J.C.Staff with Key having complete supervision over it. However, it was later delayed to a September 2020 release with Kentarō Suzuki replacing Yamakawa as the director. The anime's theme song is "Light a Way" sung by Suzuyu. It was delayed again to November 2020, before being delayed again to May 14, 2021. It was delayed even further to July 16, 2021, due to the COVID-19 pandemic.

== Music ==
The visual novel has two main theme songs: the opening theme "One's Future" by Miyako Suzuta, the voice actress of Kudryavka, and the ending theme "Hoshikuzu" (星屑, Stardust) by Haruka Shimotsuki. An insert song also sung by Suzuta, "Hoshimori Uta" (星守歌), is featured in the game as well. The single of "One's Future" was released in April 2010. Kud Wafter's original soundtrack was released on June 25, 2010, with the original release of the visual novel. The soundtrack contained 24 music tracks: 20 background music tracks, an a cappella version of "Hoshimori Uta", a remix of "One's Future" subtitled "Rock Band Mix", and the original versions of "Hoshikuzu" and "Hoshimori Uta". A ten-track arrange album remixing music from the game titled Albina: Assorted Kudwaf Songs was released at Comiket 79 in December 2010. A remix album titled Deejay Busters!, featuring tracks from Little Busters!, Little Busters! Ecstasy and Kud Wafter, were released in May 2011. A piano arrange album titled Ripresa, which also features tracks from Little Busters!, Ecstasy and Kud Wafter, was released in April 2013. Each of the albums released was on Key's record label, Key Sounds Label.

== Reception ==
In May 2010, Kud Wafter ranked first in national PC game pre-orders in Japan. The limited-edition version of Kud Wafter ranked first in terms of national sales of PC games in Japan in June 2010. In addition, Kud Wafter was reported to sell the most copies of any PC game in Japan for the first half of 2010. At some stores in Akihabara, Kud Wafter was sold at midnight the day of its release, which is cited as not happening very often for games sold in Akihabara. Kud Wafter premiered as the No. 2 game sold on Getchu.com, a major redistributor of visual novel and domestic anime products, during the month of its release, and at No. 26 in July. The game would go on to be the No. 9 game sold for the first half of 2010, and at No. 15 for the whole year. The PSP port sold 5,733 units in its first week of sales. Both the PSP and PS Vita ports were reviewed by the Japanese video game magazine Famitsu, which gave them an overall score of 27/40.
