= Mogura Anagura =

Japanese manga author

Mogura Anagura (あなぐらもぐら, Anagura Mogura; born November 23) is a Japanese manga author who has created mostly dōjinshi, but is also the illustrator of the third Little Busters! manga adaptation which began serialization in Kadokawa Shoten's manga magazine Comp Ace on March 26, 2008.
