= Music of Kud Wafter =

Kud Wafter discography
- Soundtrack albums: 1
- Singles: 1
- Remixes: 4

Kud Wafter is a visual novel developed by Key and published by VisualArt's in 2010. The story follows the lives of Riki Naoe and his close friend Kudryavka as they start to see more of each other in a romantic relationship. The discography of Kud Wafter consists of one single, one soundtrack, and three remix album. The core of the discography is the original soundtrack album produced by Key Sounds Label in 2010. The music on the soundtrack was composed and arranged by Jun'ichi Shimizu, Manack, and Donmaru. Four remix albums were released between 2010 and 2020.

== Albums ==
=== Kud Wafter Original Soundtrack ===
The Kud Wafter Original Soundtrack, from the visual novel Kud Wafter, was first released with the limited edition of the original game on June 25, 2010, in Japan produced by Key Sounds Label bearing the catalog number KSLA-0057. The album contains one disc with 24 music tracks composed, arranged, and produced by Jun'ichi Shimizu and Manack. Miyako Suzuta provides vocals for three songs: "One's Future (Rock Band Mix)", "Hoshimori Uta" and "Hoshimori Uta (a cappella ver.)"; Haruka Shimotsuki provides vocals for the song "Hoshikuzu". The album was re-released on December 29, 2011, bearing the catalog number KSLA-0077 and contained the additional track "Hoshizora".

All music is composed by Jun'ichi Shimizu.

KSLA-0057
No.	Title	Arrangement	Length
1.	"Sunday Morning Dance"	Jun'ichi Shimizu	3:03
2.	"At The Mountain Behind"	Jun'ichi Shimizu	2:55
3.	"Mini Glamour"	Jun'ichi Shimizu	1:51
4.	"Path of Sunset"	Jun'ichi Shimizu	2:48
5.	"Breath of Stars"	Jun'ichi Shimizu	2:21
6.	"Color Blossom"	Jun'ichi Shimizu	1:57
7.	"Where I Belong"	Jun'ichi Shimizu	2:42
8.	"When We Wish a Upon Star"	Jun'ichi Shimizu	2:15
9.	"Cape of Future"	Jun'ichi Shimizu	2:23
10.	"Adagio for Summer Wind"	Jun'ichi Shimizu	2:21
11.	"Trampoline Girl"	Jun'ichi Shimizu	2:14
12.	"August Green"	Jun'ichi Shimizu	2:23
13.	"Moontan"	Jun'ichi Shimizu	3:47
14.	"The Roots of Consciousness"	Jun'ichi Shimizu	4:04
15.	"Bloom of Youth"	Jun'ichi Shimizu	2:28
16.	"Further Away"	Jun'ichi Shimizu	2:33
17.	"Grief"	Jun'ichi Shimizu	3:07
18.	"Close to Edge"	Jun'ichi Shimizu	2:29
19.	"Reminiscence"	Jun'ichi Shimizu	2:30
20.	"Star Dust"	Jun'ichi Shimizu	2:21
21.	"Hoshimori Uta" (星守歌 Star Defense Song) (Lyrics by Chika Shirokiri; Performed by Miyako Suzuta)	Jun'ichi Shimizu	3:40
22.	"Hoshikuzu" (星屑 Stardust) (Lyrics by Chika Shirokiri; Performed by Haruka Shimotsuki)	Jun'ichi Shimizu	5:33
23.	"Hoshimori Uta (a capella ver.)" (星守歌 (アカペラ版) Star Defense Song (a capella ver.)) (Lyrics by Chika Shirokiri; Performed by Miyako Suzuta)	Jun'ichi Shimizu	2:45
24.	"One's Future (Rock Band Mix)" (Lyrics by Kai; Performed by Miyako Suzuta)	Manack	5:03
Total length:			69:33

KSLA-0077
No.	Title	Arrangement	Length
1.	"Sunday Morning Dance"	Jun'ichi Shimizu	3:03
2.	"At The Mountain Behind"	Jun'ichi Shimizu	2:55
3.	"Mini Glamour"	Jun'ichi Shimizu	1:51
4.	"Path of Sunset"	Jun'ichi Shimizu	2:48
5.	"Breath of Stars"	Jun'ichi Shimizu	2:21
6.	"Color Blossom"	Jun'ichi Shimizu	1:57
7.	"Where I Belong"	Jun'ichi Shimizu	2:42
8.	"When We Wish a Upon Star"	Jun'ichi Shimizu	2:15
9.	"Cape of Future"	Jun'ichi Shimizu	2:23
10.	"Adagio for Summer Wind"	Jun'ichi Shimizu	2:21
11.	"Trampoline Girl"	Jun'ichi Shimizu	2:14
12.	"August Green"	Jun'ichi Shimizu	2:23
13.	"Moontan"	Jun'ichi Shimizu	3:47
14.	"The Roots of Consciousness"	Jun'ichi Shimizu	4:04
15.	"Bloom of Youth"	Jun'ichi Shimizu	2:28
16.	"Further Away"	Jun'ichi Shimizu	2:33
17.	"Grief"	Jun'ichi Shimizu	3:07
18.	"Close to Edge"	Jun'ichi Shimizu	2:29
19.	"Reminiscence"	Jun'ichi Shimizu	2:30
20.	"Star Dust"	Jun'ichi Shimizu	2:21
21.	"Hoshimori Uta" (星守歌 Star Defense Song) (Lyrics by Chika Shirokiri; Performed by Miyako Suzuta)	Jun'ichi Shimizu	3:40
22.	"Hoshikuzu" (星屑 Stardust) (Lyrics by Chika Shirokiri; Performed by Haruka Shimotsuki)	Jun'ichi Shimizu	5:33
23.	"Hoshizora"	Jun'ichi Shimizu	5:22
24.	"Hoshimori Uta (a capella ver.)" (星守歌 (アカペラ版) Star Defense Song (a capella ver.)) (Lyrics by Chika Shirokiri; Performed by Miyako Suzuta)	Jun'ichi Shimizu	2:45
25.	"One's Future (Rock Band Mix)" (Lyrics by Kai; Performed by Miyako Suzuta)	Manack	5:03
Total length:			74:55

=== Albina: Assorted Kudwaf Songs ===
Albina: Assorted Kudwaf Songs is an arrange album which contains a selection of songs from the visual novel Kud Wafter, remixed by Jun'ichi Shimizu and Akane Doi. The album is otherwise composed by Jun'ichi Shimizu. It was first released on December 29, 2010, in Japan by Key Sounds Label bearing the catalog number KSLA-0066. The album contains one disc with ten tracks, and the first track "Overture" is original to the album. Miyako Suzuta provides vocals for two songs: "One's Word" and "Fragment"; Duca provides vocals for the song "Albina"; and Asari provides vocals for "Toriniku no Uta". After the tenth track "Hoshizora", there is the hidden track "Hoshikuzu" by Haruka Shimotsuki; this is the same "Hoshikuzu" track released previously on the Kud Wafter Original Soundtrack. The album was re-released on December 29, 2011, bearing the catalog number KSLA-0078 and contained 12 tracks. In addition to the original ten tracks, the hidden track "Hoshikuzu" was split into its own track, and the new track "Fragment Kud.ver" by Miyako Suzuta was also included.

All music is composed by Jun'ichi Shimizu.

KSLA-0066
No.	Title	Arrangement	Length
1.	"Overture"	Jun'ichi Shimizu	2:01
2.	"One's Word" (Lyrics by Kai; Performed by Miyako Suzuta)	Jun'ichi Shimizu	5:27
3.	"Albina" (アルビナ Arubina) (Lyrics by Kai; Performed by Duca)	Jun'ichi Shimizu	5:07
4.	"Urayama Shōkei" (裏山小径 Path on the Hill)	Jun'ichi Shimizu	3:38
5.	"Hoshi Furu Oka" (星降る丘 Hill of Falling Stars)	Jun'ichi Shimizu	6:56
6.	"August Wind"	Jun'ichi Shimizu	4:41
7.	"Sunday Morning Sunlight"	Jun'ichi Shimizu	3:36
8.	"Toriniku no Uta" (鶏肉の唄 Chicken Song) (Lyrics by Kai; Performed by Asari)	Jun'ichi Shimizu, Akane Doi	5:36
9.	"Fragment" (Lyrics by Kai; Performed by Miyako Suzuta)	Jun'ichi Shimizu	5:45
10.	"Hoshizora"	Jun'ichi Shimizu, Akane Doi	23:16
Total length:			66:03

KSLA-0078
No.	Title	Arrangement	Length
1.	"Overture"	Jun'ichi Shimizu	2:01
2.	"One's Word" (Lyrics by Kai; Performed by Miyako Suzuta)	Jun'ichi Shimizu	5:27
3.	"Albina" (アルビナ Arubina) (Lyrics by Kai; Performed by Duca)	Jun'ichi Shimizu	5:07
4.	"Fragment" (Lyrics by Kai; Performed by Miyako Suzuta)	Jun'ichi Shimizu	5:45
5.	"Urayama Shōkei" (裏山小径 Path on the Hill)	Jun'ichi Shimizu	3:38
6.	"Hoshi Furu Oka" (星降る丘 Hill of Falling Stars)	Jun'ichi Shimizu	6:56
7.	"August Wind"	Jun'ichi Shimizu	4:41
8.	"Sunday Morning Sunlight"	Jun'ichi Shimizu	3:36
9.	"Toriniku no Uta" (鶏肉の唄 Chicken Song) (Lyrics by Kai; Performed by Asari)	Jun'ichi Shimizu, Akane Doi	5:36
10.	"Hoshizora"	Jun'ichi Shimizu, Akane Doi	6:16
11.	"Hoshikuzu" (星屑 Stardust) (Lyrics by Chika Shirokiri; Performed by Haruka Shimotsuki)	Jun'ichi Shimizu	5:32
12.	"Fragment Kud.ver" (Lyrics by Kai; Performed by Miyako Suzuta)	Jun'ichi Shimizu	5:45
Total length:			60:20

=== Deejay Busters! ===
Deejay Busters! is a remix album of songs taken from the Little Busters!, Little Busters! Ecstasy and Kud Wafter visual novels and remixed into electronic dance music. It was originally released on May 8, 2011, at the Rewrite Fes. promotional event in Japan by Key Sounds Label bearing the catalog number KSLA-0068, and was later released for general sale on May 27, 2011. The album contains one disc with ten tracks originally composed by Jun Maeda, Shinji Orito and Jun'ichi Shimizu, and features ten separate remix artists. Of the ten tracks, 1, 2, 3, 9, and 10 are from Little Busters! and Ecstasy, while the others are from Kud Wafter. Four artists provide vocals for five songs: Rita sings "Little Busters!" and "Alicemagic", Miyako Suzuta sings "One's Future", Lia sings "Saya's Song", and Haruka Shimotsuki sings "Hoshikuzu".

Track listing
No.	Title	Music	Arrangement	Length
1.	"Little Busters! (DJ Shimamura Remix)" (Lyrics by Jun Maeda; Performed by Rita)	Jun Maeda	DJ Shimamura	5:58
2.	"Ring Ring Ring! (Kōki Izumi Remix)"	Jun Maeda	Kōki Izumi	6:01
3.	"Shitō wa Rinzen Narite (LiLA'c Remix)" (死闘は凛然なりて Commanding Struggle to the Death)	Shinji Orito	Irus	7:54
4.	"Sunday Morning Dance (Groovetune Remix)"	Jun'ichi Shimizu	Groovetune	5:57
5.	"Adagio for Summer Wind (DJ Sharpnel's bass:drive remix)"	Jun'ichi Shimizu	DJ Sharpnel	4:52
6.	"August Green (M-K-S mix)"	Jun'ichi Shimizu	Longfi	5:59
7.	"One's Future (Dee!'s Speedking Remix)" (Lyrics by Kai; Performed by Miyako Suzuta)	Jun'ichi Shimizu	Dee!	6:17
8.	"Hoshikuzu (Sumijun Remix)" (星屑 Stardust) (Lyrics by Chika Shirokiri; Performed by Haruka Shimotsuki)	Jun'ichi Shimizu	Sumijun	6:54
9.	"Saya's Song (NTMGmix)" (Lyrics by Jun Maeda; Performed by Lia)	Jun Maeda	Baker	5:06
10.	"Alicemagic (Muzik Servant Remix)" (Lyrics by Jun Maeda; Performed by Rita)	Shinji Orito	Muzik Servant	5:22
Total length:				60:20

=== Ripresa ===
Ripresa is a piano arrange album with songs taken from the Little Busters!, Little Busters! Ecstasy and Kud Wafter visual novels and arranged into piano versions. It was released on April 26, 2013, in Japan by Key Sounds Label bearing the catalog number KSLA-0089. The album contains one disc with ten tracks, eight of which are from Little Busters! and Ecstasy and the other two, tracks 5 and 9, are from Kud Wafter. The album is composed and produced by Jun Maeda, PMMK and Jun'ichi Shimizu; all the tracks are arranged by Manyo.

Track listing
No.	Title	Music	Length
1.	"Boys Don't Cry"	Jun Maeda	4:37
2.	"Little Busters!"	Jun Maeda	4:55
3.	"Mahō no Ensemble" (魔法のアンサンブル Magic Ensemble)	PMMK	4:49
4.	"Exotic Toybox" (えきぞちっく・といぼっくす Ekizochikku Toibokkusu)	PMMK	3:12
5.	"One's Future"	Jun'ichi Shimizu	5:10
6.	"Tatta Hitotsu no Mahō no Kotoba" (たったひとつの魔法の言葉 Only One Magic Word)	PMMK	5:05
7.	"Haruka Kanata" (遥か彼方 Faraway)	Jun Maeda	4:38
8.	"Saya's Song"	Jun Maeda	5:38
9.	"Hoshikuzu" (星屑 Stardust)	Jun'ichi Shimizu	4:57
10.	"Let's Return" (れっつ・りたーん Rettsu Ritān)	Jun Maeda	3:51
Total length:			46:52

=== Summer Chronicle ===
Summer Chronicle is a remix album with music tracks taken from the Air, Kud Wafter and Summer Pockets visual novels and arranged into violin and piano versions by Hironori Anazawa. The album is otherwise composed by Jun Maeda, Shinji Orito, Magome Togoshi, Jun'ichi Shimizu and Donmaru. It was released on August 22, 2020, in Japan by Key Sounds Label bearing the catalog number KSLA-0170. The album contains one disc with ten tracks; tracks 1–4 are from Air, tracks 5 and 6 are from Kud Wafter, and tracks 7–10 are from Summer Pockets.

Track listing
No.	Title	Music	Length
1.	"Natsukage" (夏影 Summer Lights)	Jun Maeda	3:20
2.	"Yumegatari" (夢語り Dream-telling)	Shinji Orito	3:07
3.	"Semigoromo" (蝉衣 Thin Clothes)	Magome Togoshi	3:31
4.	"Tsukiwarawa" (月童 Moon Child)	Magome Togoshi	3:49
5.	"At The Mountain Behind"	Jun'ichi Shimizu	3:11
6.	"August Green"	Jun'ichi Shimizu	3:06
7.	"Summer Aventure" (さま～あばんちゅ～る Samā Abanchūru)	Donmaru	3:28
8.	"Natsu no Komoriuta" (夏の子守歌 Summer Lullaby)	Shinji Orito	4:03
9.	"Deep Blue Blue"	Shinji Orito	3:27
10.	"Twinkle of Alcor"	Donmaru	3:33
Total length:			34:35

== One's Future ==
"One's Future" is a single from the visual novel Kud Wafter containing the game's opening theme song sung by Miyako Suzuta and was first released on April 23, 2010, by Key Sounds Label bearing the catalog number KSLA-0056. The single contains five tracks including original, remix and instrumental versions of "One's Future", and a background music track from the game titled "Adagio for Summer Wind". The single is composed, arranged, and produced by Jun'ichi Shimizu and Manack.

All music is composed by Jun'ichi Shimizu.

Track listing
No.	Title	Arrangement	Length
1.	"One's Future" (Lyrics by Kai; Performed by Miyako Suzuta)	Manack	5:04
2.	"One's Future (Let's Go Kud! ver.)" (Performed by Miyako Suzuta)	Manack	5:05
3.	"One's Future (Off Vocal instrumental)"	Manack	5:04
4.	"One's Future (Off Vocal+Chorus instrumental)" (Chorus by Miyako Suzuta)	Manack	5:04
5.	"Adagio for Summer Wind"	Jun'ichi Shimizu	2:12
Total length:			22:29
