= Iro ni Ide ni Keri Waga Koi wa =

2010 video game

- Developer: Windmill
- Publisher: Windmill
- Producer: Chatoru
- Artists: Kōcha; Yū Narumi
- Writer: Tahei Hirauchi
- Composer: Ecnemuse
- Platform: Windows
- Release: JP: April 29, 2010
- Genres: Eroge, Visual novel
- Mode: Single-player

Iro ni Ide ni Keri Waga Koi wa (色に出でにけり わが恋は), abbreviated as Denikeri (でにけり), is a Japanese adult visual novel developed and published by Windmill for Windows. It was released on April 29, 2010. Denikeri is Windmill's eleventh game, along with other titles like Happiness! and Shukufuku no Campanella. The game bears the tagline of "my deep love shows in the blush of my face".

== Plot ==
=== Characters ===
The player character, Yuto Kamiki (神木悠人, Kamiki Yūto), is the only son of the current maintainers of the Kamiki Shrine. He enjoys cleaning the shrine and due to his dedication of keeping the shrine in a good shape at all times, his stamina is quite high and has always done well in physical education at school. Rio Tenjo (天城梨桜, Tenjō Rio; voiced by: Tomoe Tamiyasu) is one of the two candidate successors of the Tenjo family. She has lived in England for a very long time due to circumstances caused by her parents. Kikyou Tenjo (天城桔梗, Tenjō Kikyō; voiced by: Rino Kawashima) is the other candidate successor of the Tenjo family. She is the cousin of Rio and is one year older than Rio. Komachi Suzueda (鈴枝小町, Suzueda Komachi; voiced by: Fūkei Hanataba) has been friends with Yuto since they were kids. Her family runs a bakery. Misono Misono (御園美苑, Misono Misono; voiced by: Soyogi Tōno) is a maid for the Tenjo family. Due to the trademark poker face she carries, it is very difficult to read her emotions and feelings. Yuzuna Kaede (楓柚菜, Kaede Yuzuna; voiced by: Miru) is an underclassman of Yuto and Komachi. She is a playful girl but has fainted several times in the past due to her anemia.

=== Story ===
The story of Denikeri takes place in the summer of a fictional city named Tenshin set in the modern time. Yuto Kamiki was originally going to a regular school until it was absorbed by a famous female school named Reimeikan Academy (嶺鳴館学園, Reimeikan Gakuen). The shrine that Yuto is from, the Kamiki shrine, has always been tasked with the duty of watching over a battle that determines the successor of the Tenjo family, the reigning family of the Tenshin city region. In this ceremony, Rio Tenjo and Kikyou Tenjo have to battle each other with swords. A fateful event occurs at the ceremony and Yuto ends up living with Rio.

== Development ==
Denikeri is Windmill's eleventh game after Shukufuku no Campanella and its life began around February and March 2009 at an internal staff meeting over what Windmill's next project should be. At the meeting, there were a lot of people that wanted to create a game that was set in a school. Coincidentally, after the release of Shukufuku no Campanella, the Windmill staff received several requests from players that also wanted a game that was set in a school setting. With the fans' requests matching the staff's own desires, designing and planning for a new project began in earnest. From there, the staff began removing elements such as "magic" and "supernatural powers" and then proceeded ahead with creating a story that could potentially happen in the real world.

The producer of Denikeri is Chatora. The scenarios of Denikeri is being written by Tahei Hirauchi who have previously worked on Prism Ark Love Love Maximum. The music of Denikeri is being composed by Ecnemuse. The art and character designs for Denikeri will be provided by Kōcha and Yū Narumi. This will be the first time that Narumi will be doing the art and character designs for a Windmill game. Kōcha provided character designs for Kikyou Tenjo, Misono Misono, and Haruka Tomone while Narumi provided designs for Rio Tenjo, Komachi Suzueda, and Yuzuna Kaede. With regards to the character designs, both Kōcha and Narumi stated that they were pretty much free to design them however they pleased.

=== Release history ===
The limited edition of Denikeri was released on April 29, 2010. The limited edition of the game came with a collection of illustrations and original sketches, a CD of background music tracks, and a promotional Lycee Windmill 3.0 card. A reservation campaign for Denikeri began on January 29, 2010 and took place until April 28, 2010, one day before the release of the limited edition. Those who reserve the game will receive a maxi single containing the game's theme song.

== Music ==
The opening theme, "Iro ni Ide ni Keri Waga Koi wa" (色に出でにけり わが恋は), is performed by Rekka Katakiri. The lyrics was written by Ayachi and the music and arrangement was done by Daisuke Kikuta of Element Gardens.
