= Little Busters! =

2007 visual novel by Key

- Cover art featuring heroines Rin Natsume (left) and Komari Kamikita
- Developer: Key
- Publishers: Visual Arts (Windows); Prototype (PS2, PSP, PS Vita, PS3, Switch)
- Director: Jun Maeda
- Artists: Itaru Hinoue; Na-Ga
- Writers: Jun Maeda; Yūto Tonokawa; Chika Shirokiri; Leo Kashida
- Composers: Jun Maeda; Shinji Orito; Magome Togoshi; PMMK; Manack
- Platforms: Microsoft Windows, PlayStation 2, PlayStation Portable, PlayStation Vita, PlayStation 3, Nintendo Switch
- Release: Little Busters! July 27, 2007: Windows; JP: July 27, 2007; Little Busters! Ecstasy (Note: Consumer editions in Japan were retitled Little Busters! Converted Edition.) July 25, 2008: Windows; JP: July 25, 2008; JP: November 30, 2012 (Note: This all ages version was titled Little Busters! Perfect Edition.); WW: November 1, 2017 (Note: The worldwide release was titled Little Busters! English Edition.) PlayStation 2; JP: December 24, 2009 PlayStation Portable; JP: November 25, 2010 PlayStation Vita; JP: March 22, 2012 PlayStation 3; JP: March 20, 2013 Nintendo Switch; WW: April 23, 2020
- Genres: Eroge (Note: Only the original Windows release of Little Busters! Ecstasy has adult content.); visual novel
- Mode: Single-player

Little Busters! (リトルバスターズ!, Ritoru Basutāzu!) is a Japanese visual novel developed by Key. It was released on July 27, 2007, for Windows PCs and is rated for all ages. Little Busters! is Key's sixth game, following titles such as Kanon, Air, and Clannad. An adult version of the game titled Little Busters! Ecstasy was released on July 25, 2008, for Windows, unlike Kanon and Air, which were first released with adult content and then had later versions with such content removed. Ecstasy was later ported to the PlayStation 2, PlayStation Portable, PlayStation Vita, PlayStation 3, and Nintendo Switch with the adult content removed under the title Little Busters! Converted Edition. An English version for Windows was released on Steam in 2017. The story follows a group of childhood friends (Riki Naoe, Rin Natsume, Kyousuke Natsume, Masato Inohara and Kengo Miyazawa) now attending high school called the Little Busters, as they decide to form a baseball team. Riki, who is diagnosed with narcolepsy, is tasked with recruiting more girls in preparation for a baseball game, and he bonds with each of them on account of their internal conflicts. Meanwhile, Rin gets mysterious letters from her cat Lennon to complete various tasks to learn the "secret to this world".

The gameplay in Little Busters! follows a branching plot line which offers pre-determined scenarios with courses of interaction, and focuses on the appeal of the six female main characters by the player character, which increases to nine in Ecstasy. There are additional minigames added into the gameplay, such as battle sequences that resemble fighting games or baseball batting practice, which serve to give the characters experience, obtain accessories to use during battle, and improve their statistics. Both Little Busters! and Ecstasy ranked as the best-selling PC games sold in Japan at the time of their release, and Ecstasy would go on to sell over 100,000 units. Key went on to produce an adult spin-off called Kud Wafter in June 2010, which expanded on the scenario of Kudryavka Noumi, one of the heroines from Little Busters! and Ecstasy.

There have been 14 manga adaptations based on Little Busters! and Ecstasy published by ASCII Media Works, Kadokawa Shoten and Ichijinsha. Comic anthologies, light novels and art books were also published, as were several music albums. There have been two Internet radio shows hosted by the voice actors of Rin and Kyousuke Natsume and Kudryavka Noumi. J.C.Staff produced two anime television series and an original video animation series between 2012 and 2014.

== Gameplay ==
Little Busters! is a romance visual novel in which the player assumes the role of Riki Naoe. Much of its gameplay is spent on reading the story's narrative and dialogue. The text in the game is accompanied by character sprites, which represent who Riki is talking to, over background art. Throughout the game, the player encounters CG artwork at certain points in the story, which take the place of the background art and character sprites. When the game is completed at least once, a gallery of the viewed CGs and played background music becomes available on the game's title screen. Little Busters! follows a branching plot line with multiple endings, and depending on the decisions that the player makes during the game, the plot will progress in a specific direction.

There are seven main plot lines that the player will have the chance to experience. Throughout gameplay, the player is given multiple options to choose from, and text progression pauses at these points until a choice is made. To view all plot lines in their entirety, the player will have to replay the game multiple times and make different choices to further the plot in an alternate direction. When first playing the game, the scenarios for all six heroines are available. Once a scenario for any one heroine is completed, that scenario will be unavailable in the next play-through because the last choice that will ultimately lead to that heroine's scenario becomes unavailable for players to choose. After the completion of these six routes, the final scenario called Refrain is made available, which serves to bring everything to a definite conclusion and answers questions brought up throughout the normal gameplay. Completing Refrain makes available all the heroine's scenarios that were previously made inaccessible during gameplay so that the player can revisit the scenarios again, along with some extra decision points that were previously unavailable.

An example of the fighting mode in Little Busters! featuring Rin fighting Masato

Throughout gameplay, the player encounters various minigames, which range from simple to more complex. The first type of minigame encountered is a battle sequence that resembles a fighting game, but no interaction from the player is required to fight. These recurring battle sequences represent when the members of the Little Busters get into physical fights with either each other or with others. Each member of the fight has a set of statistics attributed to them (which includes strength, stamina, agility, reflex, concentration, judgment, and luck) along with a life bar to keep track of how many hit points a fighter has left. The maximum number of hit points is determined by the given fighter's stamina rating. Weapons may be used along with any accessories the fighter has in their possession, and these items may be exchanged with other characters. Another recurring minigame involves the player being able to play baseball batting practice with members of the Little Busters. The player, as Riki, controls his position and when to swing the bat.

The Little Busters will also participate in missions to accomplish some goal, and a mission will either be completed or failed depending on the choices of the player. These missions are connected with the battle sequences and batting practice in that they serve to give the characters experience, obtain accessories to use during fights, and improve their statistics. However, these missions do not affect the main plot in any way—the player even has the choice to turn off most of the minigames so that the player may focus on the main plot, including the battle sequences and batting practice. The first time that the game is played, Rin's statistics are weak compared to those of other characters. However, when the player completes several heroines' routes, Rin's and Riki's statistics will start higher than before when the player starts a new game, allowing Rin and Riki to stand a better chance against opponents with higher statistics. The statistics of the Little Busters members are shown in a ranking system from highest to lowest in overall statistics.

Despite Little Busters! having a rating for all ages, there is an ample amount of CG artwork featuring the female characters in risqué situations, though never to the point to be considered sexual in nature. This is in stark contrast to Key's previous titles Clannad and Planetarian: The Reverie of a Little Planet that also have ratings for all ages, but those titles contain no such risqué situations or even any fan service.

In Little Busters! Ecstasy, adult elements were added to the gameplay in the form of sexual CGs depicting Riki and a given heroine having sex. Ecstasy extends the story for the scenarios of the heroines in Little Busters!, as well as increasing the number of heroine routes from six to nine. These three heroine routes include scenarios for Kanata Futaki and Sasami Sasasegawa—two supporting characters from Little Busters!—and a new heroine named Saya Tokido, who is only featured in Ecstasy. The first time the game is played, these three heroine routes are unavailable to the player until after the Refrain scenario is completed, though the player is given the option to make them immediately available. Ecstasy has several minor additions and changes to the minigames as well, including the addition of weapons available for use in the battle sequences. Also, Ecstasy features the addition of two recurring minigames related to Saya: a shooting game with pistols and navigating a labyrinth.

== Plot ==
The video game takes place is a "secret of this world" that Kyousuke talks about, which Kengo and Masato are aware of. The characters live in either the male or female dormitories on the school grounds, which are across from each other. Childhood and adolescence are two important themes in Little Busters!.

Text in Little Busters! is displayed in a dialog box, here depicting the player character talking with Komari.

Little Busters!' story revolves around the main protagonist Riki Naoe, a young male high school student. When Riki was a child, his parents died, leaving him hopeless and depressed. He was saved by a group—three boys and a girl, all his age—who referred to themselves as the Little Busters, a group dedicated to fighting evil and preserving justice. The leader of the group was Kyousuke Natsume, who had a younger sister named Rin. The other two members were Masato Inohara and Kengo Miyazawa, who were friends despite being rivals. They took Riki out and played together with him during his leisure time, making him the fifth Little Busters member. In time, Riki enjoyed playing with them, and his grief over his parents gradually faded away.

The next day, Kyousuke decides that the Little Busters are going to play a baseball match, but they do not have enough members to have a complete team. Kyousuke gives Riki and Rin the task of going around school to find more members to join, preferably girls, so as not to leave Rin the lone girl. Riki finds five girls his age willing to help him out: Komari Kamikita, Haruka Saigusa, Kudryavka Noumi, Yuiko Kurugaya, and Mio Nishizono; three other girls Riki meets are Kanata Futaki, Sasami Sasasegawa, and Saya Tokido. Throughout the game, Riki hangs out with these girls and learns more about them.

== Characters ==
=== Main characters ===
Main cast (from left to right): Top row: Masato, Kyousuke, Kengo; Middle row: Mio, Yuiko, Rin, Haruka; Bottom row: Kudryavka, Riki, Komari.

Riki Naoe (直枝 理樹, Naoe Riki)
Voiced by: Tomoe Tamiyasu (game), Yui Horie (anime) (Japanese); Shannon Emerick (English)
Riki is the male protagonist of Little Busters! who the person assumes in the game. He is the fifth member of the Little Busters and seen as the weakest of them due to his girly appearance and physical build, but acts straightforward and has common sense.
Rin Natsume (棗 鈴, Natsume Rin)
Voiced by: Tomoe Tamiyasu (Japanese); Brittney Karbowski (English)
The main heroine in the story, Rin is the younger sister of Kyousuke Natsume and is the only female member out of the five original members of the Little Busters. She does not communicate well and is seen as inarticulate.
Kyosuke Natsume (棗 恭介, Natsume Kyōsuke)
Voiced by: Hikaru Midorikawa, Yū Kamonomiya (young) (Japanese); Blake Shepard (English)
Kyosuke is the leader of the Little Busters who is one year older than the other four members. He often comes up with absurd ideas but normally follows up with a reasonable explanation along with it. Kyosuke suffers from a sibling complex, as he wants his sister Rin to call him onii-chan despite her rejection. In the game, the player must hit the balls to him during practice sessions if they want to raise Riki's statistics faster for a battle ranking game.
Masato Inohara (井ノ原 真人, Inohara Masato)
Voiced by: Nobutoshi Canna (Japanese); Greg Ayres (English)
Masato is a member of the Little Busters and Riki's roommate with an interest in Riki for Riki, which he is more than willing to express out aloud. His low concentration and judgment points mean he is more likely to make tactical errors during the baseball game. However, depending on the choice the player makes on May 17, his skills during the baseball game can be increased further but he still tends to make mistakes.
Kengo Miyazawa (宮沢 謙吾, Miyazawa Kengo)
Voiced by: Yūsei Oda, Yū Kamonomiya (young: game, anime season 1), Megumi Han (young: anime season 2) (Japanese); Leraldo Anzaldua (English)
Kengo is a member of the Little Busters. He is skilled in kendo and seems to have a cynical personality, but his passion for the Little Busters is unmatched by anyone. Kengo is recruited after Masato, Kyousuke, and Rin defeat his father, making him the fourth member of Little Busters.
Komari Kamikita (神北 小毬, Kamikita Komari)
Voiced by: Natsumi Yanase (Japanese); Tia Ballard (English)
Komari is a childish girl who loves fairytales, picture books, candy, and frilly clothing. She is one of the weakest characters along with Kudryavka, but has the fastest growth rate of any character in the game. If the player chooses to raise her statistics by hitting the ball to her during a practice session, which can be fairly difficult especially while Komari is running, she can be made into a valuable player in the field.
Haruka Saigusa (三枝 葉留佳, Saigusa Haruka)
Voiced by: Keiko Suzuki (Japanese); Margaret McDonald (English)
Haruka is Riki's schoolmate from a different class. She causes disturbances for her own personal enjoyment, which causes her twin sister, the public morals chairman Kanata Futaki, to often chase after her. Haruka is a quite agile character, but has poor concentration and judgment values, which often causes her to make poor decisions in battle and baseball games. However, she is one of the most active players on the baseball field.
Kudryavka Noumi (能美 クドリャフカ, Nōmi Kudoryafuka)
Voiced by: Naomi Wakabayashi (Japanese); Tiffany Grant (English)
Kudryavka, also known as "Kud" (クド, Kudo) for short, is a girl who is 1/4 Japanese and 3/4 Russian. Her grandfather was interested in Japanese culture and per his influence on her, she also learned much about Japanese culture, including the language. Despite having poor English skills, she could skip a year in school due to credits obtained through studying abroad. Kudryavka is Riki's classmate and is in the newly-formed home economics club due to an invitation of the head of the dormitory she lives at with the other characters.
Yuiko Kurugaya (来ヶ谷 唯湖, Kurugaya Yuiko)
Voiced by: Ryōko Tanaka (Japanese); Carli Mosier (English)
Yuiko is Riki's classmate who has a self-sufficient personality. She is sometimes seen carrying a replica of a katana called Muramasa. Yuiko is seen as an older sister to everyone despite being the same age of almost the entire cast, and is referred to as Anego (姉御; lit. 'elder sister') by Haruka. Yuiko is the strongest female character in the game until the player completes routes of all heroines.
Mio Nishizono (西園 美魚, Nishizono Mio)
Voiced by: Shiho Kawaragi (game, anime season 2), Yuiko Tatsumi (anime season 1) (Japanese); Caitlynn French (English)
Mio is a calm and diligent girl who surprisingly has weak health. She enjoys reading, especially when the story contains boys love elements, and her room is filled with books. Mio carries around a book of poems by Bokusui Wakayama. Despite this, her body can be deceiving as she is quite powerful enough to hold plenty of books.

=== Supporting characters ===
Miyuki Koshiki (古式 みゆき, Koshiki Miyuki)
Voiced by: Yū Kamonomiya (game), Yōko Honda (anime) (Japanese); Nancy Novotny (English)
Miyuki is a girl in the archery club who lost her right eye due to an archery accident. Her family is known for being skilled in archery. Due to being in a similar situation of Kengo, she worries about him.
Midori (美鳥)
Voiced by: Yumi Arai (game), Yuiko Tatsumi (anime) (Japanese); Caitlynn French (English)
Midori is Mio's forgotten imaginary sister who comes to life in the artificial world and takes Mio's place. Her personality is the polar-opposite of Mio. She materializes due to taking Mio's shadow, thus has no shadow, but does not hide it.
Kojirō Kamikita (神北 小次郎, Kamikita Kojirō)
Voiced by: Asahi Morishōji (game), Tōru Ōkawa (anime) (Japanese); John Swasey (English)
Kojirō is an old man in a nursing home Komari and Riki volunteer at. He has trouble keeping his room clean.
Takuya Kamikita (神北 拓也, Kamikita Takuya)
Voiced by: Yuu Kamonomiya (Japanese); Connor Leach (English)
Komari's older brother. He has a weak physical appearance and because of his long stay in the hospital, he is always seen wearing pajamas. Despite being sick, he was still a friendly guy who liked to draw and create stories, and always taking care of his younger sister.
Chernushka Ivanova Strugaskaya ((チェルヌシカ・ストルガツカヤ, Cherunushika Sutorugatsukaya)
Voiced by: Naomi Wakabayashi (Japanese); Tiffany Grant (English)
Kudryavka's mother and the daughter of Ivan Strugatskaya, Chernushka is half-Russian and half-Japanese.

== Development ==
For the first time in Key's history, two artists were given the position of art director for the visual novel: Itaru Hinoue and Na-Ga. Hinoue has been Key's signature art director since Key's first game Kanon, and Na-Ga has been with Key since the production of Air working as one of the computer graphics artists to render background art used in Key's games. Due to having two art directors, character design was split between the two, though Na-Ga is responsible for the character design of the majority of the cast. Of the six heroines in the story, three were designed by each artist; Komari, Haruka, and Yuiko were designed by Hinoue, while Rin, Kudryavka, and Mio were done by Na-Ga.

For work on the scenario, Jun Maeda contributed along with composing some of the game's music. Further writers include Leo Kashida who had worked on Tomoyo After: It's a Wonderful Life, and two new scenario writers to Key—Yūto Tonokawa, and Chika Shirokiri. Maeda wrote the scenarios for Rin and the entire male cast; Kashida wrote the scenario for Mio; Tonokawa wrote the scenarios for Komari and Yuiko; finally, Shirokiri wrote the scenarios for Haruka and Kudryavka. In an interview of Maeda and Tonokawa in the August 2007 issue of Push!!, it was reported that the story of Little Busters! is twice as long as Air's, but only half as long as Clannad's. However, this does not take into account the minigames in Little Busters! which serve to lengthen the game. The music in the game, not counting Maeda's, was composed by Key's signature composers Shinji Orito and Magome Togoshi, in addition to Manack and members of PMMK. Togoshi left Key in October 2006 before the visual novel went on sale.

Three or four months before the release of Little Busters!, it was decided that an adult version of the game would be developed titled Little Busters! Ecstasy (リトルバスターズ!エクスタシー, Ritoru Basutāzu Ekusutashī), or Little Busters-EX for short. Na-Ga designed the heroine Saya Tokido, and Maeda wrote her scenario. Tonokawa wrote Sasami Sasasegawa's scenario, and Shirokiri wrote Kanata Futaki's story. Lines from the original game were rewritten as well for Ecstasy, and the total number of lines with spoken dialogue comes to 43,347 lines. The total word count in Ecstasy exceeds that of Clannad by about 4,000 words, making it Key's longest work, and carries so much data that Ecstasy was released on two DVDs instead of one for the original release.

=== Marketing ===
An art exhibition of Little Busters! was held in Osaka, Japan between May 3 and May 4, 2007, and in Tokyo, Japan between May 24 and May 25, 2007. A large amount of the character and background art featured in the game was showcased, along with original art used to promote the character artwork, and other production sketches drawn when the game was still in development. Flowcharts outlining the story for the game were on display, along with the flowcharts for Clannad. Also at the exhibition was a life-size mannequin of Rin Natsume with a baseball glove in one hand, though instead of a baseball, a cat was in the glove. This mannequin was later put onto the Japanese Yahoo! Auction website in late September 2007 and sold for 764,000 yen, a far cry from the original wish of selling the figure for 5,000,000 yen.

Little Busters! was the first Key title to receive coverage in an entire issue of Dengeki G's Festival!, a special edition version of Dengeki G's Magazine which is published in irregular intervals each year by ASCII Media Works; the issue in question was the ninth, published on June 30, 2007. Along with a full 80 pages of information on Little Busters!, the magazine came bundled with a double-sided hug pillowcase, a small cell phone cleaner which could also attach to a cell phone, and a B5 size jigsaw puzzle. ASCII Media Works published the third volume of another special edition version of Dengeki G's Magazine named Dengeki G's Festival! Deluxe on June 30, 2008, which had a focus on Little Busters! Ecstasy. Along with again containing about eighty pages of information pertaining to the visual novel, the magazine also comes bundled with an ergonomic mousepad, a jigsaw puzzle, and a deck of playing cards. The third volume of another magazine in the Festival! line, Dengeki G's Festival! Comic, was sold on July 26, 2008, with Rin and Dorj on the cover, and the magazine came bundled with a hug pillowcase, a notepad, and a B2 size poster.

=== Release history ===
On June 1, 2007, a free game demo of Little Busters! became available for download at Key's official website. In the demo, the player is introduced to the characters of the Little Busters group in the game through a short visual novel sequence. The demo does not give the player the chance to interact with the scene presented, making the demo a short kinetic novel. The game was released in Japan as a limited-edition version on July 27, 2007, as a DVD playable on Windows PCs; the regular edition was released on September 28, 2007. The limited edition contained an arrange album of some of the music featured in the game, and a 128-page visual guide book titled Natsume Kyousuke Fūrai Ki (棗恭介風来記). The book contained information and images on characters, background CGs, the art exhibition, images of the heroines published in various Japanese anime and gaming magazines, a question and answer section, information on the creators of the game, and lyrics of a couple of songs featured in the game.

Little Busters! Ecstasy was released as a limited-edition version on July 25, 2008, as two DVDs playable only on a Windows PC; the regular edition followed on September 26, 2008. The limited edition came bundled with a remix album of music featured in the game, and a 22-minute length CD containing a special broadcast of the Little Busters! Internet radio show. An updated version, 1.01, for the limited edition of Ecstasy was released by Key for free on their website on September 22, 2008; the regular edition of Ecstasy contains this update. An all ages version of Ecstasy for Windows was released by Key on July 31, 2009 in a box set containing five other Key visual novels called Key 10th Memorial Box.

Prototype released a PlayStation 2 (PS2) port of Ecstasy titled Little Busters! Converted Edition on December 24, 2009, which removed the adult elements of the game. The PS2 version was available to try at Key 10th Memorial Fes, an event held in commemoration of Key's tenth anniversary between February 28 and March 1, 2009. A PlayStation Portable (PSP) version of Little Busters! Converted Edition, also by Prototype, was released on November 25, 2010. The Windows and PS2 versions had voice acting for only the major characters, but the PSP version contained full voice acting for all of the characters other than Riki. Prototype also released a version of Little Busters! Converted Edition ported to the PlayStation Vita (PS Vita) on March 22, 2012. Along with also having full voice acting, the PS Vita version contains 1.4x larger CGs than the Windows edition, and the limited edition came bundled with a drama CD. Prototype released a PlayStation 3 (PS3) version of Converted Edition with the additional content included in the previous consumer ports on March 20, 2013. An added feature in the PS3 version is a 3D rendering of the minigame in Saya's route, where the player must navigate a labyrinth. A downloadable version of the PS3 release via the PlayStation Store was released by Prototype on May 29, 2013.

Key released an all-ages version of Ecstasy titled Little Busters! Perfect Edition (リトルバスターズ!パーフェクトエディション) on November 30, 2012 for Windows. The Perfect Edition contains the additional content featured in the consumer ports, and came bundled with additional merchandise including: an expanded reprint of Natsume Kyousuke Fūrai Ki, a CD containing a special recording of the Internet radio show Little Busters! R, Microsoft Gadgets, wallpapers, a Rin Natsume-themed system sounds package for Windows which uses dialogue of Tomoe Tamiyasu—the voice of Rin, and nine promotional cards from the trading card games Weiß Schwarz, Chaos TCG and Megami Engage. A version of the Perfect Edition for a worldwide release titled Little Busters! English Edition was released on Steam on November 1, 2017, which is also compatible with Steam Deck. The English Edition features a swappable English and Japanese script, added touchscreen support, and is in high-definition. Prototype released a Nintendo Switch port on April 23, 2020, with text support for both Japanese and English.

== Adaptations ==
- Little Busters!

リトルバスターズ! (Ritoru Basutāzu!)
- Genre: Drama, romance
- Manga
- Little Busters! The 4-koma; Little Busters! (Nobuyuki Takagi); Little Busters! (Mogura Anagura); Little Busters! Ecstasy: Saya Tokido School Revolution; Little Busters! Ecstasy: Wonderbit Wandering; Little Busters! EX The 4-koma; Little Busters! Ecstasy: Sasami Sasasegawa Black Cat Fantasia; Little Busters! Kudryavka Noumi; Little Busters! Ecstasy: Kanata Futaki My Minroud; Little Busters! Band Mission; Little Busters! Ecstasy Heartful; Little Busters! End of Refrain; Little Busters! (Kurohachi); Little Busters! Last of Refrain
- Anime television series

Little Busters! (2012–2013) Little Busters! Refrain (2013)
- Directed by: Yoshinobu Yamakawa
- Written by: Michiru Shimada; Yuniko Ayana
- Music by: Shinji Orito; Magome Togoshi; Jun Maeda; Manabu Miwa
- Studio: J.C.Staff
- Licensed by: AUS: Hanabee; NA: Sentai Filmworks; UK: MVM Films
- Original network: Tokyo MX, TV Kanagawa, MBS, TV Aichi, BS11, AT-X
- English network: NA: Anime Network; SEA: Animax Asia
- Original run: October 6, 2012 – December 28, 2013
- Episodes: 39 + OVA
- Original video animation

Little Busters! EX
- Directed by: Yoshinobu Yamakawa
- Written by: Michiru Shimada
- Studio: J.C.Staff
- Licensed by: AUS: Hanabee; NA: Sentai Filmworks; UK: MVM Films
- Released: January 29, 2014 – July 30, 2014
- Runtime: 24 minutes each
- Episodes: 8

=== Books and publications ===
A series of 12 short stories were serialized in the Japanese bishōjo magazine Dengeki G's Magazine, published by ASCII Media Works. The stories, under the collective title Official Episode Collection, were published in two batches: the first six stories were published between the March 2006 and August 2006 issues, while the second batch of six were serialized between the October 2006 and March 2007 issues. In each of the two batches, one of the six stories centered on one of the six heroines, and featured illustrations by Itaru Hinoue and Na-Ga. The stories were written by the respective scenario writer for each girl: Jun Maeda wrote Rin's, Leo Kashida wrote Mio's, Yūto Tonokawa wrote Komari's and Yuiko's, and Chika Shirokiri wrote Haruka's and Kudryavka's stories. Key released five volumes of another series of official short stories, written by the original scenario staff and titled Little Busters! SS, on iOS and Android devices between November 1, 2012, and March 7, 2013.

A single-volume light novel anthology was released by Ichijinsha on January 25, 2008 under their DMC Novel imprint titled Little Busters! Novel Anthology. The anthology was written by six authors and illustrated by six artists. Four volumes of a short story compilation series by several authors titled Little Busters! SSS were published by Harvest between April and November 2008. Harvest published a novel by Tasuku Saika titled Little Busters! Saigusa Haruka no Jikenbo (リトルバスターズ!三枝葉留佳の事件簿, Little Busters! Haruka Saigusa's Trouble Record Book) in September 2008. Ten volumes of another short story compilation series by several authors called Little Busters! Ecstasy SSS were published by Harvest between January 2009 and October 2010. Five volumes of an adult novel series titled Little Busters! Ecstasy H&H written by several authors were published by Harvest between February and June 2009. Harvest published a novel by Osamu Murata titled Little Busters! Ecstasy: Bokura no Gakuensai Sensō (リトルバスターズ!エクスタシー 僕らの学園祭戦争, Little Busters! Ecstasy: Our School Festival War) in March 2009.

Two volumes of a short story anthology compilation series written by Shin'ichirō Kodama, Ken'ichi Itoi, and Kachō titled LittBus. (りとばす。, Ritobasu.) were released between May and July 2009. Paradigm published a light novel anthology character series in three volumes titled Little Busters! Ecstasy Anthology between February and June 2010. Harvest published a light novel anthology character series in three volumes titled Little Busters! Ecstasy Character Anthology between June and December 2010. Harvest published an illustrated short story anthology titled Little Busters! Ecstasy 4-Page Short Story Collection in October 2010. Paradigm published two volumes of a light novel collection between December 2010 and April 2011. Paradigm published a light novel based on Kudryavka, written by Masayuki Ogura and illustrated by Ayumu Shōji, on September 28, 2012. Paradigm also published a light novel under their VA Bunko imprint, written by Mariko Shimizu and illustrated by Zen, on October 30, 2013.

An art book titled Little Busters! Perfect Visual Book (リトルバスターズ! パーフェクトビジュアルブック, Ritoru Basutāzu! Pāfekkto Bijuaru Bukku) was released on December 20, 2007. Published by ASCII Media Works, the 206-page, hard-cover book contains a compilation of the published and promotional art from the visual novel, detailed character profiles and memo sections, and an overview of the visual novel's plot. Also included are all the CG scenes from the game, concept illustrations, staff interviews, and a short story "'Our' Morning" (「僕ら」の朝, 'Bokura' no Asa) written by Yūto Tonokawa. A short section also includes the sheet music and lyrics of the vocal songs featured in the game. Included with the book were two pencil boards. The statistics of the battle equipment used in the mini-games are listed on one of the boards. Another art book titled Little Busters! Ecstasy Perfect Visual Book (リトルバスターズ!エクスタシー パーフェクトビジュアルブック, Ritoru Basutāzu! Ekusutashī Pāfekkto Bijuaru Bukku) was released on December 19, 2008 by ASCII Media Works.

=== Manga ===
The cover of the first volume of the Little Busters! The 4-koma manga

A four-panel comic strip manga, titled Little Busters! The 4-koma and illustrated by Yūya Sasagiri, was serialized between the March 2006 and March 2010 issues of ASCII Media Works' Dengeki G's Magazine. Some chapters begin as a normal manga layout and follow with comic strips. An "extra" chapter was published in the ninth volume of Dengeki G's Festival! on June 30, 2007, and special chapters of the manga have been published in ASCII Media Works's manga magazine Dengeki G's Festival! Comic. Four tankōbon volumes were released between August 27, 2007 and April 27, 2010, published by ASCII Media Works under their Dengeki Comics EX imprint. Sasagiri also illustrates the Little Busters! EX The 4-koma four-panel comic strip manga, which began serialization in the June 2010 issue of Dengeki G's Magazine. The manga ended serialization in the magazine's May 2014 issue and continued serialization in Dengeki G's Comic between the June and December 2014 issues. Four volumes for Little Busters! EX The 4-koma were released between February 26, 2011, and January 27, 2015.

A third manga, titled Little Busters! and illustrated by Nobuyuki Takagi, was serialized in Dengeki G's Festival! Comic between November 26, 2007, and October 25, 2013. Six volumes of Takagi's Little Busters! manga were released between April 27, 2009 and December 21, 2013. A fourth manga, titled Little Busters! and illustrated by Mogura Anagura, was serialized between the May 2008 and April 2010 issues of Kadokawa Shoten's magazine Comp Ace and was referred to as the "official Little Busters! comic". Two volumes were released for Anagura's Little Busters! manga: the first on September 26, 2008, and the second on April 22, 2010.

A fifth manga adaptation, titled Little Busters! Ecstasy: Saya Tokido School Revolution (リトルバスターズ!エクスタシー 朱鷺戸沙耶 -SCHOOL REVOLUTION-) and illustrated by Zen, was serialized in Dengeki G's Festival! Comic between January 26, 2009, and February 23, 2010. A single volume of Saya Tokido School Revolution was released on April 27, 2010. Zen also illustrated the Little Busters! Ecstasy: Sasami Sasasegawa Black Cat Fantasia (リトルバスターズ!エクスタシー 笹瀬川佐々美 -Black Cat Fantasia-) manga, which was serialized in Dengeki G's Festival! Comic between June 26, 2010 and April 26, 2011. A single volume of Sasami Sasasegawa Black Cat Fantasia was released on May 27, 2011. Zen later illustrated the Little Busters! Ecstasy: Kanata Futaki My Minroud (リトルバスターズ! EX 二木佳奈多 〜My Minroud〜) manga as well, which was serialized in Dengeki G's Festival! Comic between June 23, 2011, and June 26, 2012. A single volume of Kanata Futaki My Minroud was released on August 27, 2012.

Zen also illustrated the manga Little Busters! End of Refrain, which began serialization in the November 2012 issue of Dengeki G's Magazine. The manga ended serialization in the magazine's May 2014 issue and continued serialization in Dengeki G's Comic between the June 2014 and January 2015 issues. Four volumes of End of Refrain were released between March 27, 2013, and January 27, 2015. Zen later illustrated the manga Little Busters! Last of Refrain (リトルバスターズ! Last of Refrain), which was serialized in Dengeki G's Comic from the November 2016 issue, sold from September 30, 2016, to the May 2019 issue, sold on March 30, 2019. Three volumes of Last of Refrain were released between September 27, 2016 and July 26, 2019.

A tenth manga, titled Little Busters! Ecstasy: Wonderbit Wandering (リトルバスターズ!エクスタシー ワンダービット ワンダリング) and illustrated by Juri Misaki, was serialized between the May 2010 and January 2012 issues of Comp Ace. Three volumes of Wonderbit Wandering were released between September 25, 2010, and December 26, 2011. An 11th manga, titled Little Busters! Kudryavka Noumi (リトルバスターズ! 能美クドリャフカ) and illustrated by Kazusa Yoneda, was serialized between April 2011 and March 2013 issues of Ichijinsha's Comic Rex. Four volumes for Kudryavka Noumi were released between August 27, 2011, and March 27, 2013. A 12th, four-panel comic strip manga, titled Little Busters! Band Mission (リトルバスターズ!ばんどみっしょん) and illustrated by Misaki Sakura, was serialized between the August 2011 and March 2013 issues of Ichijinsha's Manga 4-koma Palette. A 13th manga, titled Little Busters! Ecstasy Heartful (リトルバスターズ!エクスタシーはーとふる) and illustrated by Itotin, was serialized between the May 2012 and December 2013 issues of ASCII Media Works' Dengeki Hime. Three volumes of Little Busters! Ecstasy Heartful were released between October 15, 2012, and December 15, 2013. A 14th manga, titled Little Busters! and illustrated by Kurohachi, was serialized between the November 2012 and July 2013 issues of Kadokawa Shoten's Comptiq. Two volumes of Kurohachi's Little Busters! manga were released between March 9 and September 26, 2013.

There have also been many sets of manga anthologies produced by different companies and drawn by a multitude of different artists. Six volumes of the earliest anthology series, a collection of four-panel comic strips released by Enterbrain under the title Magi-Cu 4-koma Little Busters!, were released between September 2007 and July 2008 under their MC Comics imprint. Three volumes of an anthology series released by Ichijinsha under the title Little Busters! Comic Anthology were released between October 2007 and July 2008 under their DNA Media Comics imprint. Three volumes of an anthology series released by Ohzora under the title Little Busters were released between November 2007 and January 2008 under their Twin Heart Comics imprint. Another anthology was released in a single volume by Harvest on December 20, 2007, titled Ike! Ike! Bokura no Little Busters! (いけ!いけ!僕らのリトルバスターズ!, Go! Go! Our Little Busters!). A manga anthology titled Little Busters! Comic A La Carte (リトルバスターズ!コミックアラカルト) appeared in Comp Ace.

Enterbrain released 17 volumes of a collection of four-panel comic strips under the title Magi-Cu 4-koma Little Busters! Ecstasy between November 2008 and August 2012. Four volumes of an anthology titled Little Busters! Ecstasy Comic Anthology were released by Ichijinsha between November 2008 and August 2011. Ichijinsha released 10 volumes of the anthology Little Busters! Ecstasy Ecstatic Anthology between July 2009 and November 2013. An anthology published by Brain Navi titled Little Busters! Ecstasy 4-koma Maximum (リトルバスターズ！エクスタシー 4コマMAXIMUM, Ritoru Basutāzu! Ekusutashī 4-koma MAXIMUM) was released in December 2008. Another anthology titled Little Busters! Ecstasy Comic A La Carte (リトルバスターズ！エクスタシー コミックアラカルト) appeared in Comp Ace and a single volume was released in April 2010. Two volumes of a manga anthology based on the Little Busters! Ecstasy H&H novel anthologies were released by Harvest in June and August 2010.

ASCII Media Works released two volumes of an anthology titled Little Busters! Ecstasy Comic Anthology between December 2012 and February 2013. Enterbrain released three volumes of a collection of four-panel comic strips under the title Magi-Cu 4-koma Little Busters! Re:play between December 2012 and March 2013. Ichijinsha published an anthology drawn by Haruka Hano titled Ring Ring Busters! in January 2013. Ichijinsha published an anthology titled TV Anime Little Busters! Comic Anthology in March 2013. Each of the anthology series are written and drawn by an average of 20 people per volume.

=== Internet radio shows ===
An Internet radio show to promote Little Busters! called Natsume Brothers! (ナツメブラザーズ!, Natsume Burazāzu!) had a pre-broadcast on June 9, 2008, and started regular broadcasting on June 23, 2008. The show was hosted by Tomoe Tamiyasu and Hikaru Midorikawa, who voice Rin and Kyousuke Natsume from Little Busters!, for the first 35 broadcasts. Starting with the following broadcast on March 2, 2009, the show's title was changed to Natsume Brothers! (21) (ナツメブラザーズ! (21), Natsume Burazāzu! (21)), and a third host was added, Miyako Suzuta, who voices Kudryavka Noumi from Little Busters!. The show's final broadcast, episode 170, was on October 24, 2011. The show was streamed online every Monday, and was produced by the Japanese Internet radio station Onsen.

An exclusive 22-minute broadcast of the show was included with the first press release of Little Busters! Ecstasy sold on July 25, 2008. Four CD compilation volumes containing the 35 episodes of Natsume Brothers! (including the pre-broadcast) were released between September 24, 2008, and March 26, 2009. Each volume also comes with a new bonus episode. Another 15 CD compilation volumes containing all 135 episodes of Natsume Brothers! (21) were released between June 26, 2009, and February 24, 2012. Each volume also comes with a new bonus episode. An exclusive broadcast of Natsume Brothers! (21) was included with the release of the PlayStation 2 version of the game, Little Busters! Converted Edition, on December 24, 2009.

A second Internet radio show to promote the anime adaptation titled Little Busters! R broadcast 99 episodes between October 5, 2012, and September 12, 2014. Like the previous radio show, it was normally hosted by Tamiyasu, Midorikawa, and Suzuta. However, once a month, the show was hosted by Midorikawa and Nobutoshi Canna, who voices Masato Inohara. The show was streamed online every Friday and was produced by Hibiki and Onsen. The 99 episodes were released on 11 compilation volumes between January 30, 2013, and January 28, 2015. Each volume also comes with a new bonus episode.

=== Anime ===
A 26-episode anime television series adaptation, directed by Yoshinobu Yamakawa and produced by J.C.Staff, aired between October 6, 2012, and April 6, 2013 on Tokyo MX. The screenplay was written by Michiru Shimada, and chief animator Haruko Iizuka based the character design used in the anime on Itaru Hinoue's and Na-Ga's original designs. The anime series was released on nine BD/DVD compilation volumes between December 26, 2012, and August 28, 2013, by Warner Home Video in limited and regular editions. A BD containing an original video animation (OVA) episode was available for mail order to those who bought all nine limited edition BD/DVD volumes.

The staff and cast from the anime returned for a 13-episode second season titled Little Busters! Refrain, which mainly covers the final scenario in the visual novel. It aired between October 5 and December 28, 2013, on AT-X. The episodes were released on seven BD/DVD compilation volumes between January 29 and July 30, 2014, by Warner Home Video in limited and regular editions. A series of eight OVA episodes titled Little Busters! EX, based on the Ecstasy version of the game, are included on the BD/DVD releases of Refrain.

For the first season, the opening theme is "Little Busters! (TV animation ver.)" and the ending theme is "Alicemagic (TV animation ver.)". Both songs are sung by Rita and are remixes of the theme songs featured in the original visual novel. For Refrain, the opening theme is "Boys be Smile" by Suzuyu and the ending theme is "Kimi to no Nakushi Mono" (君とのなくしもの) by Ayaka Kitazawa. For Little Busters! EX, the opening theme is "Little Busters! EX" by Rita, and the ending theme "Mezameta Asa ni wa Kimi ga Tonari ni" (目覚めた朝にはきみが隣に) by Suzuyu. The rest of the soundtrack for both anime series is sampled from albums released for the visual novels, Little Busters! Original Soundtrack and Little Busters! Ecstasy Tracks, and the Little Busters! Refrain Original Soundtrack.

The series was also streamed by Crunchyroll with English subtitles. The anime has been licensed by Sentai Filmworks for release in North America. Section23 Films released two BD/DVD collections on November 19, 2013, and April 22, 2014. Refrain has also been licensed by Sentai Filmworks, and it was released on BD and DVD on January 20, 2015. Sentai Filmworks also licensed Little Busters! EX. After the acquisition of Crunchyroll by Sony Pictures Television, Little Busters!, among several Sentai Filmworks titles, was dropped from the Crunchyroll streaming service on March 31, 2022. Hanabee Entertainment has licensed the series in Australia and New Zealand for a January 2014 release on BD and DVD. MVM Films has licensed the series in the United Kingdom.

A crossover anime series, Kaginado, featured characters from Little Busters! alongside other characters from franchises by Key including Kanon, Air, Clannad, Rewrite, and others. The anime debuted on October 13, 2021.

== Music ==
The visual novel Little Busters! has six main theme songs, starting with the opening theme "Little Busters!", sung by Rita. There are four different ending themes; three depend on which heroine's story is completed, and the last is the game's final ending theme. The first ending theme for Yuiko's story is "Song for friends", which is also used as the first ending theme of the Refrain scenario. The ending theme for Komari and Haruka is "Alicemagic", which is also used as the second ending theme for Yuiko. The ending theme for Kudryavka and Mio is "Amenochi Hare" (雨のち晴れ, Clear Weather After the Rain), and the final ending theme is "Little Busters! (Little Jumper Ver.)", which is used as the second ending theme of Refrain. One last theme song is an insert song played during Refrain called "Haruka Kanata" (遥か彼方, Faraway). The insert song and each of the ending themes are also sung by Rita. While not a theme song, the ending theme for Rin's scenario is the background music track "Regret" composed by PMMK. Seven of the main characters from Little Busters! have background music leitmotifs—the original six heroines, and Kyousuke Natsume. Rin's theme is "Ring Ring Ring!"; Komari's theme is "Mahō no Ensemble" (魔法のアンサンブル, Magic Ensemble); Haruka's theme is "Sawagashi Otome no Yūshū" (騒がし乙女の憂愁, Grief of a Noisy Girl); Kudryavka's theme is "Exotic Toybox" (えきぞちっく・といぼっくす, Ekizochikku Toibokkusu); Yuiko's theme is "Kokoroiro Kisōkyoku" (心色綺想曲, Heart-colored Capriccio); Mio's theme is "Hikari ni Yosete" (光に寄せて, Approaching Light); lastly, Kyousuke's theme is "Boys Don't Cry".

Little Busters! Ecstasy features a remixed version of "Little Busters!" as the game's opening theme called "Little Busters! (Ecstasy Ver.)". The song is a remixed version of the remix included in the album Rockstar Busters!. Ecstasy also features remixed versions of the ending themes "Song for friends" and "Alicemagic". The former is a remix version featuring fewer lyrics and is renamed to "Song for friends (No Intro Ver.)", while the latter is the remix included on Rockstar Busters!, but renamed to "Alicemagic (Rockstar Ver.)". The remix of "Alicemagic" is used as the ending theme for Kanata's and Sasami's stories, and the remix of "Song for friends" is used as a background music track. A new theme song featured in Ecstasy is Saya's ending theme "Saya's Song" and is sung by Lia. Saya's leitmotif is called "Kakeru" (駆ける, Run) and is a remix version of the song "Hashiru" (走る, Run) on Riya's 2005 album Love Song released by Key Sounds Label. Kanata's leitmotif is "Will&Wish", and Sasami's theme is "Neko to Garasu to Marui Tsuki" (猫と硝子と円い月, Cat, Glass, and the Round Moon).

A maxi single titled "Little Busters!" was released in May 2007. This first single contained "Little Busters!", "Haruka Kanata", and "Alicemagic" in original and instrumental versions. As with Key's previous works (excluding Planetarian: The Reverie of a Little Planet), a music album came bundled with the limited-edition release of the game; the album, released on July 27, 2007, was called Semicrystalline. and contained arranged versions of 10 tracks of the game's music. Eight of the tracks were background music while the last two were remix versions of "Little Busters!" and "Haruka Kanata". The game's original soundtrack was first released in August 2007 at Comiket 72, containing three discs with 53 tracks. Of the 53 total tracks, three were left out of the visual novel. The original soundtrack was re-released in Japanese stores on September 28, 2007. Two more albums were released at Comiket 73 in December 2007: another arrange album titled Rockstar Busters! and an image song single called "Rin no Hisoka na Koi no Uta / Mission:Love sniper" sung by Tomoe Tamiyasu, the voice actress who voiced Rin in the game.

In February 2008, a trance remix album of Little Busters! themes titled OTSU Club Music Compilation Vol.2 was released by OTSU—a disc jockey unit composed of a number of different remix artists. An EP was released in May 2008 containing original and remix versions of "Little Busters!", "Faraway", and "Alicemagic"; the remix versions are from the second OTSU Club Music Compilation album. A remix album titled Ontology containing arranged versions of nine tracks from Little Busters! Ecstasy was released bundled with the limited-edition release of that game on July 25, 2008. A soundtrack containing the additional music tracks in Ecstasy titled Little Busters! Ecstasy Tracks was released in August 2008 at Comiket 74. An image song single called "Saya no Nemureru Requiem / Saya's Song" sung by Harumi Sakurai, the voice actress who voiced Saya in Little Busters! Ecstasy, was released in February 2009 as a limited edition, and for general sale in March 2010. Two more image song singles were released in December 2009 at Comiket 77: "Raison / Pickles o Oishikusuru Tsukurikata" sung by Keiko Suzuki who voiced Kanata Futaki in Little Busters!, and "Neko to Garasu to Marui Tsuki / Alicemagic (Aroma Tablet mix)" sung by Tomoe Tamiyasu, who voiced Sasami Sasasegawa.

A remix album titled Deejay Busters!, featuring tracks from Little Busters!, Ecstasy and Kud Wafter, was released in May 2011. A single sung by Rita was released in October 2012 for the first anime series titled "Little Busters! (TV animation ver.) / Alicemagic (TV animation ver.)", which contains the anime's opening and ending themes in original, short, and instrumental versions. A piano arrange album titled Ripresa, which also features tracks from Little Busters!, Ecstasy and Kud Wafter, was released in April 2013. A single sung by Suzuyu was released in October 2013 for the Little Busters! Refrain anime series titled "Boys be Smile / Mezameta Asa ni wa Kimi ga Tonari ni", which contains the anime's opening theme. A single sung by Ayaka Kitazawa was released in November 2013 for the Refrain anime series titled "Kimi to no Nakushi Mono / Namidairo no Tsubasa", which contains the anime's ending theme. A soundtrack containing tracks featured in the Refrain anime titled Little Busters! Refrain Original Soundtrack was released in December 2013 at Comiket 85. A compilation album titled Little Busters! Perfect Vocal Collection mainly containing previously released vocal tracks for the visual novels and anime adaptations, was released in April 2014. Each of the albums released were on Key's record label Key Sounds Label.

== Reception ==
=== Critical reception ===
Getchu.com hosts a yearly voting poll called the "Getchu.com Bishōjo Game Ranking" where game users vote online for the best games of the previous year in several different categories. For the 2007 ranking, the categories were: overall, scenario, theme songs, background music, visuals, gameplay system, and heroines. In February 2008, users cast votes for more than 470 different titles released in 2007, and among the rankings, Little Busters! ranked first in all categories aside from visuals (placing third), and gameplay system (placing second). Rin ranked as the number one most popular heroine, while Kudryavka ranked fourth, and Komari ranked 13th. For the 2008 ranking, the categories were: overall, scenario, gameplay system, graphics, opening theme video, vocal theme songs, background music, individual characters, individual voices, and game title naming.

In early 2009, users of Getchu.com cast votes for more than 400 different titles released in 2008, and among the rankings, Little Busters! Ecstasy ranked second overall, second in scenario, third in gameplay system, twelfth in graphics, fifth in opening theme video, third in vocal theme songs, second in background music, fifth (Saya Tokido) and tenth (Kudryavka Noumi) for individual characters, first (Kazane's role as Saya Tokido) and sixth (Tomoe Tamiyasu's role as Rin Natsume) for individual voices, and second for game title naming. The PS Vita port in 2012 was reviewed by the Japanese video game magazine Famitsu, which gave it four scores of 8, 8, 7, and 7 out of a possible 10.

In a review of the first six episodes of the anime adaptation, Carl Kimlinger of Anime News Network gave Little Busters! a C rating overall, criticizing its overuse of the "same gags over and over again, with predictably diminishing returns." He praised the "guy-to-girl ratio" compared to other series made by Key, but notes that Riki is a "bland main character." Kimlinger panned J.C.Staff's "unexciting professionalism" and for "animation that is only good enough to avoid looking cheap."

=== Sales ===
From June to July 2007, the limited edition of Little Busters! ranked second in national PC game pre-orders in Japan. The limited-edition version of Little Busters! ranked first in terms of national sales of PC games in Japan in July 2007. The game (which includes the regular edition) ranked consecutively seven more times achieving sales rankings of 14th, 25th twice in a row, 37th, 39th twice in a row, and 41st between the months of August 2007 and February 2008. According to public sales information published at Gamasutra, taken from the Japanese Amazon website, Little Busters! was the number one top seller between July 26, 2007 and August 17, 2007 for Japanese PC game sales. The game dropped to third highest the following week taken from August 24, 2007. Little Busters! was the highest selling game for the month of July 2007 on Getchu.com, and dropped to twelfth in the ranking the following month. Regardless of the drop in ratings earlier in the year, Little Busters! ended up as the most widely sold game of 2007 on Getchu.com.

From May to July 2008, Little Busters! Ecstasy ranked first in national PC game pre-orders in Japan. The limited-edition version of Little Busters! Ecstasy ranked first in terms of national sales of PC games in Japan in July 2008. Ecstasy sold quickly in Akihabara on its first day of sales, and by the end of the first day, about half the stores were already sold out of the game. By the next day, the majority of stores in Akihabara were sold out of Ecstasy. Only four days after Ecstasy's initial release, Key reported that many stores were already sold out of the game as well. Three months after Ecstasy's initial release, Key reported that the game had already sold over 100,000 units. Little Busters! Perfect Edition ranked at 18th in terms of national sales of PC games in Japan in November 2012.

The nine anime Blu-ray Disc (BD) compilation volumes for the anime's first season ranked in the top ten on Japan's Oricon weekly BD sales chart. The first three volumes sold over 8,000 units each in their first week of sales. For Little Busters! Refrain, the seven BD volumes ranked in the top ten on Japan's Oricon weekly BD sales chart.

=== Legacy ===
A cover version of "Little Busters!" appeared in the sequel of Front Wing's visual novel Time Leap titled Time Leap Paradise released on July 24, 2009. Rin and Kudryavka were featured as characters in Illusion's Characolle! 3D animation program series. The program's third entry, Characolle! Key, was released on March 4, 2011, and included the characters' models and scenery assets based on the locals in Little Busters! as part of the package.

After the success of Little Busters! and Ecstasy, an adult spin-off titled Kud Wafter was developed by Key and released on June 25, 2010. Set directly after the events of Little Busters!, the story follows Riki and Kudryavka as they start to see more of each other in a romantic relationship at the onset of summer vacation. A mobile app game for iOS and Android titled Little Busters! Card Mission, produced through VisualArt's and distributed via Mobage, was released on April 24, 2013. The player collects cards of varying rarity featuring Little Busters! characters, obtained through completing various minigame missions, to form a team. The player then trains the team's characters to improve their statistics and eventually challenge others who play the game. Paradigm published the first volume of an art book series for the game titled Little Busters! Card Mission ArtWorks on April 29, 2014. A Blu-ray Disc game, produced by VisualArt's and titled Nishizono Mio Misshitsu Satsujin Jiken? (西園美魚密室殺人事件?, Mio Nishizono's Locked-Room Murder Case?), was released on the first BD/DVD compilation volume for the Little Busters! Refrain anime series on January 29, 2014. Characters from Little Busters! also appeared in the mobile game Rewrite IgnisMemoria as part of a collaboration event.
