= Tomoe Tamiyasu =

Japanese voice actress and singer

Tomo Tamiyasu
- 民安 ともえ
- Born: January 3 Hiroshima, Japan
- Other name: Tomoe Tamiya
- Occupations: Voice actress; singer
- Years active: 1997–present
- Agent: Rock'n Banana
- Spouse: Keisuke Nakamura

Tomoe Tamiyasu (民安 ともえ, Tamiyasu Tomoe; born January 3) is a Japanese voice actress and singer from Hiroshima, generally performing for adult games. She debuted in 2005 as a voice actress and started her singing career in 2006. Tamiyasu has been the host of three Internet radio shows, and has been a guest on a fourth. She is also known under the name Tomoe Tamiya, such as when she voiced Rin Natsume from Key's visual novel Little Busters!. She also sang songs on an image vocal album released for Little Busters! for Rin. She attended Anime Expo in 2012 with the industry guest MangaGamer. She married voice actor Keisuke Nakamura in 2015.

Since December 2018, Tamiyasu is also active as a virtual YouTuber under the name Tammy (たみー, Tamii). About 124,000 subscribers and 12 million views until April 2023.

== Filmography ==
2005

- Hitozuma Swapping Seikatsu
- Hotaru no Kigi
- I-ki-na-ri Iinazuke: Hime-sama no Okoshire
- Mareido: Chōkyō no Kan
- Mugen Rinkan
- Ohime-sama wa Tokkun Chū!!2: Uketsugareshi Sei Naru Majutsu
- Osananajimi no Nukumori
- Pa-pi-ko-n: Futago no Musume wa Dōkyūsei
- Project Sex

2006

- >>Fami! Kyō no Menu wa Lesson C
- Ano Machi no Koi no Uta
- AV King
- Chicchai Medio-san
- Chokotto Vampire
- Cloth × Close: Boku ga Kiin!?
- CooL!! Kyō Musume Jun Reika
- Cross Fire
- Double Solid
- Elder Vice
- Figyū @ Mate
- Jokyōshi Yūko
- Kansen
- Kunoichi Saya
- Mamotte Agechū! Karaoke-hen "Masami"
- Mamoote Agechū! Shūshoku Party-hen Rankōshi Chū zo!
- Moeru Downhill Night 2
- Onegai Goshushin-sama!
- Onidō Fūgamiki
- Oshiete Miko Sensei
- Rabu + Rabi
- Reijō Kurabu: Dajoku no Ryoshūtachi
- Seikishi Sanranki
- Snow: Plus Edition

2007

- Ane wa Bikini Model
- Arcus X: Itsuwari no Rinjin, Inkō e no Shōtaijō
- Arcus X: Seigen no Kaishōsha, Shinobiyoru Inmu
- Arcus X: Seigen Sensō, Ingoku no Kiseki
- Ayatsuri Haramase Dream Note
- Boku ga Koshita Ojō-sama
- Chikan Senyō Sharyō: Kutsujoku no Chikan Densha
- Dain Miko
- Fūrinkan-san: Kono Mi Ikutabi Kegasare Yōto mo
- Hime Kishi Angelica: Anatatte Hontō ni Saitei no Kuzu da wa!
- Jōtai Saishū: Onna no Mata ni Hisomu Chō
- Inbaku Kankin Chōkyō
- Inran Roshutsu Chōkyō
- Inshoku Chikan Densha
- Kankeizu
- Kansen 2: Inzai Toshi
- Kyun Kyun Dō: Otona no Tame no Oisha-san Gokko
- Little Busters! as Rin Natsume, Riki Naoe, and Sasami Sasasegawa
- Love kiss! Anchor
- Mahō Shōjo Nayuta
- Megami Taisen
- Mimi × Mimi: Hatsujō Chūiho
- Moeru Downhill Night Blaze
- Ōzoku
- Ore no Megami-sama!
- Osananajimi wa Bed Yakuza!
- Rururu to Sasara no Sensei Oshiete: Boku wa Onna no Obōcchama
- Shifuki Mermaid
- Sorudianji Mahō Kurabu
- Trouble Succubus 'Darling, Kona mo Ippaai Ecchi Shichao'
- Zoku Hitō Meguri

2008

- 5 as Shino Harunire
- Hoshiuta as Nanano Suoh
- Little Busters! Ecstasy as Rin Natsume, Riki Naoe, and Sasami Sasasegawa

2009

- Hoshiuta: Starlight Serenade as Nanano Suoh
- Hime to Boin as Maple-hime
- W.L.O. Sekai Ren'ai Kikou as Ina

2010

- Deardrops as Yayoi Ooba
- Iro ni Ide ni Keri Waga Koi wa as Rio Tenjo
- In Search of the Lost Future as Nagisa Hanamiya

2011

- Tsugou no Yoi Sexfriend? as Kotori
- The Fruit of Grisaia as Makina Irisu

2015

- The Eden of Grisaia as Makina Irisu
- Charlotte as Mishima

2018

- 100% Orange Juice! as Nanako

2020

- Overflow as Ayane Shirakawa

== Game theme songs ==
- "Famifami", opening theme of >>Fami! Kyō no Menu wa Lesson C
- "Kirakira × Keeper", opening theme of Osōji Sentai Clean Keeper
- "Love Love Trouble", opening theme of Trouble Succubus 'Darling, Kona mo Ippaai Ecchi Shichao'
- "Meido-san Super Live!", opening theme of Onegai Goshushin-sama!
- "MySweetHome", opening theme of SweetHome
- "Oyome-san ga Megami-sama", opening theme of Ore no Megami-sama!
- "Sensei Oshiete", opening theme of Rururu to Sasara no Sensei Oshiete: Boku wa Onna no Obōcchama
- "Dakko Shite Gyu! ~Nanji Tonari no Yome wo Aise~" Opening theme of Dakko Shite Gyu! -Ore no Yome wa Dakimakura-
- "Happy my home", opening of "Happy wedding in livingroom"
