= Risa Kubota =

Japanese voice actress

Risa Hoshina
- 保科 李沙
- Born: August 2, 1995 (age 31); Saitama Prefecture, Japan
- Other name: Risa Kubota (久保田梨沙)
- Occupation: Voice actress
- Years active: 2015–2023; 2025–present
- Agent: Sega Music
- Notable work: Konohana Kitan as Ren; Lapis Re:Lights as Rosetta; I'm Standing on a Million Lives as Iu Shindo; Dropout Idol Fruit Tart as Roko Sekino

Risa Hoshina (保科 李沙, Hoshina Risa), formerly Risa Kubota (久保田 梨沙, Kubota Risa) is a Japanese voice actress from Saitama Prefecture who is affiliated with Sega Music. She began her voice acting activities with Mausu Promotion in 2015 until 2023, and played her first main role in an anime series as Ren in Konohana Kitan. She is also known for her roles as Rosetta in Lapis Re:Lights, Iu Shindo in I'm Standing on a Million Lives, and Roko Sekino in Dropout Idol Fruit Tart.

== Biography ==
Kubota was born in Saitama Prefecture on August 2, 1995. During her nursery school years, she had few friends, but she was fond of playing outside and playing dodgeball. In elementary school, she developed skills in physical education and home education. She also developed an interest in making sweets. Upon entering high school, she enrolled at an all-girls school, where she continued to practice making sweets while making friends. It was also during this time she began to become interested in pursuing a career as a voice actress.

In 2015, Kubota enrolled in a voice acting training school operated by the talent agency Mausu Promotion, belonging to the same class as Takako Tanaka. During her training, she played her first voice acting role in the mobile game Cross Summoner. Upon completion of her training, she formally became affiliated with Mausu Promotion in 2017. That same year, she played her first main role in an anime, voicing the character Ren in Konohana Kitan. In 2018, she was cast as Rosetta in the multimedia project Lapis Re:Lights and became a member of the idol unit Lights; she would later reprise the role for its anime television series adaptation in 2020. Also in 2020, she would play the roles of Iu Shindo in I'm Standing on a Million Lives and Roko Sekino in Dropout Idol Fruit Tart; she and her fellow cast members also performed the opening and ending themes for Dropout Idol Fruit Tart.

On July 31, 2023, Kubota announced her retirement from the voice acting industry via her Twitter account, which was confirmed by Mausu Promotion.

Almost two years later on March 25, 2025, it was announced that Kubota would return to the entertainment industry under the name Risa Hoshina.

== Filmography ==
=== Anime ===
2016

- Aikatsu Stars! as Mayu Midō (episode 10)
- Scorching Ping Pong Girls as Referee

2017

- Akiba's Trip: The Animation as Maid, Boy
- Konohana Kitan as Ren
- Anime-Gatari as Host (episode 3), Tennis club member (episode 9)

2018

- Pop Team Epic as Paparu (episode 2)
- Fate/Extra: Last Encore as Female student (episode 1)
- Magical Girl Site as Rinka Kouchi
- The Girl in Twilight as Daichi Ōkubo

2019

- If It's for My Daughter, I'd Even Defeat a Demon Lord as Izabine (episode 9)

2020

- Aikatsu on Parade! as Kokoro Momoi
- Lapis Re:Lights as Rosetta
- I'm Standing on a Million Lives as Iu Shindo
- Dropout Idol Fruit Tart as Roko Sekino

2021

- I'm Standing on a Million Lives 2nd Season as Iu Shindo

2023

- By the Grace of the Gods 2nd Season as Carla

=== Video games ===
2022

- AI: The Somnium Files – Nirvana Initiative as Amame
