= Ulysses: Jeanne d'Arc and the Alchemist Knight =

Japanese light novel and its adaptations

- First light novel volume cover

ユリシーズ ジャンヌ・ダルクと錬金の騎士 (Yurishīzu Jan'nu Daruku to Renkin no Kishi)
- Genre: Historical fantasy
- Light novel
- Written by: Mikage Kasuga
- Illustrated by: Tomari Meron
- Published by: Shueisha
- Imprint: Dash X Bunko
- Original run: August 25, 2015 – November 22, 2018
- Volumes: 7 + 1 prequel
- Manga

Ulysses: Jeanne d'Arc to Hyakunen Sensō no Himitsu
- Illustrated by: Yagi Shinba; Hirafumi
- Published by: Shueisha
- Magazine: Dash X Comic
- Original run: February 28, 2018 – November 14, 2018
- Volumes: 1
- Anime television series
- Directed by: Shin Itagaki
- Produced by: Yoshihiro Iwasaki; Terushige Yoshie; Hideyuki Saida; Natsuko Kawasaki; Nobuhiko Kurosu; Tatsurō Hayashi; Toshiaki Aoshika
- Written by: Ryunosuke Kingetsu
- Music by: Taku Iwasaki
- Studio: AXsiZ
- Licensed by: NA: Crunchyroll
- Original network: Tokyo MX, Sun TV, BS Fuji, AT-X
- Original run: October 7, 2018 – December 30, 2018
- Episodes: 12

Ulysses: Jeanne d'Arc and the Alchemist Knight (ユリシーズ ジャンヌ・ダルクと錬金の騎士, Yurishīzu Jan'nu Daruku to Renkin no Kishi) is a Japanese light novel series written by Mikage Kasuga and illustrated by Tomari Meron. Seven volumes and one prequel volume have been published by Shueisha since August 2015 under their Dash X Bunko imprint. A manga adaptation with art by Yagi Shinba and Hirafumi titled Ulysses: Jeanne d'Arc to Hyakunen Sensō no Himitsu (ユリシーズ ジャンヌ・ダルクと百年戦争のひみつ) was serialized in Shueisha's Dash X Comic website from February to November 2018. An anime television series adaptation by AXsiZ aired from October to December 2018.

== Plot ==
Montmorency is a young knight whose dreams is to become an alchemist and find out the secret of the Philosopher's Stone.

When the English army occupy northern France during the Hundred Years War, most of the young students of the Knights School are sent in battle, and the same occurs for Montmorency's secret love, who is apparently killed during the Battle of Azincourt; after this, everyone's routes take different ways, at the point of finding themselves as enemies when some of their households choose to betray France for England. In search of a way to stop every war, Montmorency performs a secret alchemic ritual that allows him to evoke the Queen of the Fairies Astaroth, which promises to teach him how to use the stone to become a Ulysses, an immortal alchemist with infinite power.

In the following seven years, Montmorency keeps on learning from Astaroth how to become a Ulysses while traveling along France, but due to unexpected events, he ends up performing the ritual on a young dying girl named Jeanne, who becomes the Ulysses in his place. In this way, Jeanne will gain the power to turn the tides of the war and be known from now on as Jeanne d'Arc.

== Characters ==
Montmorency (モンモランシ, Monmoranshi)
Voiced by: Ryōta Ōsaka (Japanese); Aaron Dismuke (English)
A young alchemist in search of a way to unveil the secret behind the Philosopher's Stone and become a Ulysses, a supreme being with the power to create a worldwide utopia. He met Jeanne and used half of the stone to save her life, he has sworn to protect her and make sure that her fate of holy savior of France is fulfilled. Once forced to swallow the other half of the stone to save Jeanne, he too has become an Ulysses, gaining the power to turn wind and air into an unbreakable shield.
Jeanne d'Arc (ジャンヌ・ダルク, Jannu Daruku)
Voiced by: Yūko Ōno (Japanese); Bryn Apprill (English)
A twelve-year-old young girl from Domremy with a kind and gentle personality. After having been mortally wounded by the English when Domremy is attacked, Montmorency has put half of his Philosopher's Stone in her body to save her life, making her the new Ulysses. Due to her young age and having only half of the stone in her body, Jeanne can become an Ulysses just for three minutes; in this form, she turns into a powerful and almost invincible fighter, but at the same time she becomes extremely brutal and sadistic, since the stone's power amplifies her arrogance.
Astaroth (アスタロト, Asutaroto)
Voiced by: Hisako Tōjō (Japanese); Leah Clark (English)
The immortal Queen of the Fairies and the guardian of the Philosopher's Stone, called in the human world by Montmorency to help him become a Ulysses. She loves to provoke Montmorency and scold him for his lack of experience. As long as the Philosopher Stone exists, as its guardian, she cannot die.
La Trémoille (ラ・トレムイユ, Ra Toremuiyu)
Voiced by: Atsushi Abe (Japanese); Austin Tindle (English)
Montmorency's cousin, he's the Grand Chamberlain of France. Despite his being Charlotte's first counselor, he thinks that the Valois has no chance to win against the English; for this, he conspires with the English and the Burgundy household to end the war with a treaty that will surrender half of France to the enemy, leaving however the still free lands under Charlotte's control. Once found out and forced to escape, he sides with the Inquisition to destroy Jeanne. He's also a sadistic and sinister collector of fairies.
Arthur de Richemont (アルテュール・ド・リッシュモン, Arutyūru do Risshumon)
Voiced by: Manami Numakura (Japanese); Madeleine Morris (English)
One of Montmorency's childhood friends, and the young boy's secret love since when they studied at the Knights Academy. When the French army is wiped away in the battle of Azincourt, her broken sword has been found on the battlefield by Montmorency, pursuing the boy to think her dead. However it's later revealed that she's been captured by the English. She belongs to the Brittany household.
Philip (フィリップ, Firippu)
Voiced by: Yūki Takada (Japanese); Dani Chambers (English)
The heir of the Burgundy household, she's one of Montmorency's childhood friends. After the Battle of Azincourt her family has chosen to betray the Valois and side with the English. It's revealed later that she is a Ulysses known as "Dark Ulysses" through the use of Montmorency's elixir and a cursed helmet, the Saint Grail. Apart from turning into a young woman, as a Dark Ulysses she becomes as brutal and powerful as Jeanne, but differently from her she takes pleasure in killing her enemies; plus this, the Saint Grail's healing powers protect her from almost every mortal wound she suffers.
Charlotte (シャロット, Sharotto)
Voiced by: Saori Ōnishi (Japanese); Amber Lee Connors (English)
Third daughter of the French Royal Family of the Valois, she's the third member of Montmorency's old group of friends. After her brothers' death in the Battle of Azincourt, she's become the next heir to the throne.
La Hire (ラ・イル, Ra Iru)
Voiced by: Shizuka Ishigami (Japanese); Dawn M. Bennett (English)
The commander of a mercenary unit sent by Charlotte to protect Domremy and the rest of Lorraine. She wields a massive lance and a pistol. She loves cute things and because of this, she becomes infatuated with Jeanne and Astaroth the moment she saw them. During the Siege of Orléans she stabs herself with the holy sword Joyeuse to fight the demon Enlil, turning into an Ulysses and gaining the Ultimate Eye, a special power that implements her aiming abilities to their maximum.
Jean d'Alençon (アランソン, Aranson)
Voiced by: Junji Majima (Japanese); Daman Mills (English)
The commander the French army during the Siege of Orléans, he's Richemont's younger brother and the ruler of Alençon. He's one of the few nobles of Northern France still loyal to the Valois.
Batard (バタール, Batāru)
Voiced by: Yūki Kuwahara (Japanese); Hayden Daviau (English)
Charlotte's illegitimate cousin and her trustworthy bodyguard, he's Alençon's second-in-command during the Siege of Orléans. Despite his being a boy, he dresses and acts as a girl by Charlotte's order, to satisfy the princess' desire of having a little sister.
Xaintrailles (ザントライユ, Zantoraiyu)
Voiced by: Hidenori Takahashi (Japanese); David Matranga (English)
Second-in-Command of La Hire's mercenary unit, he fights by wielding a massive broadsword. He's in love with his Commander, continuously trying to receive a kiss from her.

== Media ==
=== Light novel ===
| No. | Release date | ISBN |
|---|---|---|
| 1 | August 25, 2015 | 978-4-08-631011-6 |
| 2 | August 25, 2015 | 978-4-08-631064-2 |
| 3 | April 22, 2016 | 978-4-08-631108-3 |
| 0 | October 25, 2017 | 978-4-08-631210-3 |
| 4 | February 23, 2018 | 978-4-08-631233-2 |
| 5 | September 21, 2018 | 978-4-08-631265-3 |
| 6 | November 22, 2018 | 978-4-08-631277-6 |

=== Manga ===
A manga drawn by Yagi Shinba and Hirafumi. Story is a bit different from the novel and the anime.

| No. | Release date | ISBN |
|---|---|---|
| 1 | November 19, 2018 | 978-4-08-891153-3 |

=== Anime ===
An anime television series adaptation by AXsiZ aired from October 7 to December 30, 2018, on Tokyo MX and other channels. The series is directed by Shin Itagaki, with Ryunosuke Kingetsu handled the series composition, Jouji Sawada designed the characters, and Taku Iwasaki composed the music. The opening theme is "Libération" (リベラシオン) by Mai Fuchigami and the ending theme is "Hundred years' melammu" (百年のメラム) by rionos. The series was simulcast by Crunchyroll, with Funimation producing an English dub as it aired. Following Sony's acquisition of Crunchyroll, the dub was moved to Crunchyroll. The series ran for 12 episodes. On November 27, 2018, due to unrevealed reasons, AXsiZ announced that episode 9 of the show was delayed for a week.

| No. | Title | Original air date |
|---|---|---|
| 1 | "Oath"; Transliteration: "Renkinjutsu to, Yōsei to" (Japanese: 錬金術と、妖精と) | October 7, 2018 |
In 1415's France, Montmorency and his friends Richemont, Charlotte and Philippe are students at a Paris Knights School. However, Montmorency is more interested in alchemic studies, and his dream is to unveil the true power of the Philosophers' Stone that his ancestors bought back from the Holy Land during the last crusade. Meanwhile, France and England are fighting each other during the Hundred Years War, and soon every household serving the King of France is called to arms to protect Paris from the enemy. Before departing, the four friends swear to remain together till their last breath and do their best to end the war, but a short time later the French Army faces a dramatic defeat in Azincourt, and Richemont is apparently killed during the battle. Seeing his remaining friends leaving his side (Charlotte is called back to her castle, since her brothers' death has made her the heir to the throne, while Philippe's Household surrenders Burgundy to the English), Montmorency desperately performs a ritual to call a demon capable of making him able to find out the secret of the stone in exchange for his soul, calling the Queen of the Fairies Astaroth in the human world. Astaroth teaches Montmorency how to create the Elixir, which power will allow him to swallow the stone and gain his power becoming an Ulysses. However something goes wrong, and due to an unexpected side-effect at the end of the ritual Montmorency discovers that seven years has passed meanwhile.
| 2 | "The Girl Called Jeanne"; Transliteration: "Jan'nu to iu shōjo" (Japanese: ジャンヌという少女) | October 14, 2018 |
Montmorency starts traveling around France, alongside Astaroth in search of a way to complete the ritual and become a Ulysses. One day his never-ending journey leads him to the small village of Domremy where he meets Jeanne, a twelve-year-old girl with a kind and pure heart. Meanwhile, the English army has conquered most of Northern France, and Lorraine is about to fall; because of this, Princess Charlotte sends the mercenary commander La Hire and her soldiers to protect the people. Meanwhile in Domremy, Montmorency discovers from Astaroth that the ritual has made his body capable of producing an endless amount of elixir, however due to this he's no longer able to swallow the stone, since the elixir in his body could easily send him berserk and kill him. The English forces arrive sooner than expected and there are too many for La Hire's army to defeat. During the battle, Jeanne is mortally wounded after seeing her friendly fairies brutally killed by the English, and to save her life Montmorency decides to perform a ritual on her, inserting half of the stone in Jeanne's body. The ritual saves Jeanne and makes her a Ulysses, but also turns her into a brutal and ruthless fighter. Jeanne then defeats the English forces and almost kills La Hire for being jealous. Fortunately, the power of the stone stops at the right moment, proving that Jeanne can only become a Ulysses for three minutes. At that point, knowing that she can no longer remain in Domremy, Jeanne chooses to depart with La Hire and Montmorency. La Hire fears that as the rumors of Jeanne's power start spreading she will be marked as an heretic and hunted by the Inquisition, but Montmorency objects that on contrary she'll become a holy saint that will repel the English and save France.
| 3 | "To the Scheming Palace"; Transliteration: "Bōryaku no kyūtei e" (Japanese: 謀略の宮廷へ) | October 21, 2018 |
Montmorency starts spreading rumors about Jeanne's supposed holiness, claiming that she's the legendary virgin chosen by God to protect France from evil named in old legends. When rumor start spreading, Montmorency and Jeanne go to Chinon to speak with Charlotte herself and ask her to make Jeanne a knight and a commander of the French army. Thinking that Jeanne is just another charlatan in search of money, Charlotte tries to mock her by switching her place on the throne with a maid during a party, but with Astaroth's help Jeanne finds out the trick, gaining even more notoriety. On another occasion Jeanne saves Charlotte from an assassination attempt, but at the end of the battle a mysterious man named Girald appears saying that the assassin's true objective was to make Jeanne weak enough to claim the Philosopher's Stone. Meanwhile, Montmorency is captured by La Tremoille, his own cousin and one of Charlotte's advisors, who captures Astaroth too, and Montmerncy is thrown in the castle's dungeon. In prison, he finds Richemont, who tells him how after the Battle of Agincourt she had chosen to swear loyalty to Henry V, hoping to gain enough influence in both kingdoms to negotiate the end of the war; however after Henry's death she had fled due to his brother's sinister ego, but once returned to France she was branded as a traitor and jailed.
| 4 | "Who Was the Promise For"; Transliteration: "Ano yakusoku wa daregatameni" (Japanese: あの約束は誰がために) | October 28, 2018 |
La Tremoille reveals to Montmorency his plan to reach an agreement with the English, surrendering the already occupied France to the Burgundy to turn it into an England's satellite nation and create an independent southern French kingdom, using Philippe as a mediator. However, before Montmorency and Richemont can be killed, La Hire and her mercenaries attack the castle and save them. Montmorency and the others then try to save Jeanne and Charlotte from Girald, who threatens Jeanne's life to force Montmorency to surrender his half of the stone; however, Montmorency succeeds in tricking him, and Girald dies after having swallowed the stone without the elixir's protection. Once the battle is over, Montmorency tries to pursue Philippe to swear her loyalty to the Valois, reuniting France against the English; Philippe however refuses, claiming that Girald was following her orders to claim the stone in order to fulfil her deceased father's last wish to make her family the next rulers of France, and leaves the castle after having stolen some elixir by kissing Montmorency. Despite this, Charlotte decides to finally take the fate of the nation in her hands, and in front of the entire court she makes Jeanne a knight and the commander of the French Army, with Montmorency as her second-in-command. However, La Tremoille escapes, seeking the Inquisition's help to discredit Jeanne's holiness and get his vengeance.
| 5 | "Proof of Purity"; Transliteration: "Junketsu no Shōmei" (Japanese: 純潔の証明) | November 4, 2018 |
In order to reclaim Reims and proceed with Charlotte's coronation as the new Queen of France, the French army needs to break the siege in Orléans, the loss of which would open the gates of all France to the English. Since Charlotte has not enough soldiers to send to defend Orléans, Richemont tries to search for her weak brother's help, only to find out that he has no intention to side with either the English or the French until the war is over. Meanwhile, La Trémoille returns to Chinon with a letter of the Inquisition, which requires a virginity test of Jeanne to prove that she has not copulated with the Devil to gain her powers; however, Charlotte and Montmorency refuse to give their authorization to the test, fearing that the Inquisition might use a trick to demonstrate its theory. Further, due to a discussion with Charlotte, Richemont decides to resign from her role of knight and leaves the castle for an unknown destination. At the end, La Trémoille successfully moves the people of Chinon to attack the castle to force Charlotte authorizing the test; Montmorency and Astaroth try to calm the crowd, but in the end they're both saved by Jeanne, who uses the power of the ancient sword Joyeuse to become a Ulysses in front of everyone: at this change everyone recognizes her as a Saint, leading to a mass recruitment that recreates the French army in the blink of an eye. Meanwhile, in Burgundy, Philippe wears an ancient cursed helmet, using Montmorency's elixir to turn into a Dark Ulysses.
| 6 | "Ashes to Ashes"; Transliteration: "Haihahaini" (Japanese: 灰は灰に) | November 11, 2018 |
Jeanne and Montmorency successfully reach the besieged Orléans, whose army is commanded by Richemont's younger brother Alençon and Charlotte's illegitimate cousin, Batard. Alençon however initially refuses the newcomers' help and launches a frontal assault of his own, but he's seriously wounded by Philippe. Jeanne and Montmorency face Philippe and defeat her, forcing the girl to retreat and assuring a successful withdrawal for their allies into the city. Despite this, thanks to Jeanne's influence the French army reconquers most of the castles and fortresses around Orléans, moving Bedford to hire the English mercenary and Ulysses Hunter Gladsale, who sides with Philippe to counter Pucelle's power. However, Jeanne's supporters quickly get out of control, and even with the girl's insistence (provoked by the fact that the stone is starting to change her personality even out of her Ulysses form) Alençon has no choice but attack the powerful stronghold of Les Tourelles, located on the other side of the bridge that passes over the Loire and connects Orléans with the southern bank. During the battle, however, Jeanne is tricked by Philippe, who successfully blocks her allowing Glasdale to pierce both their hearts with an arrow made from the Lance of Longinus, another powerful Philosopher's Stone with the power of preventing pierced organs from healing. Jeanne's defeat quickly demoralizes the French army, which retreats almost immediately, even as Alençon succeeds in stopping the English from claiming Pucelle's body.
| 7 | "Rain and Memory in Brittany"; Transliteration: "Ame to Tsuioku no Burūtānyu" (Japanese: 雨と追憶のブルターニュ) | November 18, 2018 |
The French army regroups at the Augustines, an old monastery now turned into a fortress close to Les Tourelles, but Jeanne is now comatose from having lost her heart, with the Stone barely able to keep her alive. Astaroth tells Montmorency that the only way to save her is with Escalibor (Excalibur), another ancient Philosopher's Stone with the power of healing any wound. Since the sword is said to be located in Montmorency's native land Brittany, Alençon requires him to contact his grandfather Jean de Craon and ask him for soldiers to sustain the battle. Despite the hate between him and his grandfather, Montmorency travels to Champtocé and speaks with Jean, who answers that he'll lend him soldiers only if Montmorency agrees to marry his own cousin Catherine de Thouars, uniting the two most powerful households in Brittany. Montmorency initially refuses to break his oath to stay alongside Jeanne without marrying, but Catherine, despite her love for him, agrees to make Jean de Craon believe that they had made love during the night; in this way, Montmorency's grandfather agrees to lend him the soldiers he wants, despite having learned from his old friend Flamel that his grandson may be the legendary Antichrist that will end the world. Meanwhile, La Hire's unit is sent to Orléans to assist Alençon, and Philippe too is able to waken thanks to the helmet's healing abilities.
| 8 | "Return of the Female Saint"; Transliteration: "Seijo no Kikan" (Japanese: 聖女の帰還) | November 25, 2018 |
While La Hire and Xaintrailles protect Orléans, Astaroth leads Alençon and Batard to the place where she had hidden Escalibor's scabbard, revealing her to be the legendary Lady of the Lake that retrieved the sword after the death of King Arthur. Once they reach the hideout with the help of some fairies, the group encounters the Welsh writer and novelist Thomas Malory, who tries to steal the scabbard on Bedford's order; Astaroth however manages to retrieve it, and in order to counter the arriving English army Alençon orders Batard and Astaroth to return in Orléans while he stays back to fight, keeping Malory with him as hostage. Fortunately, Richemont's army arrives just in time to save Alençon (even though Malory escapes), then brother and sister head to the road between Champtocé and Orléans, where La Tremoille is trying to stop Montmorency's troops with his own personal army. While Richemont keeps La Tremoille occupied, Montmorency and Alençon finally reach the Augustines, where thanks to the scabbard and Montomorency's kiss Jeanne successfully heals and wakes up.
| 9 | "Dance Music of White and Black"; Transliteration: "Shiro to Kuro no Bukyoku" (Japanese: 白と黒の舞曲) | December 9, 2018 |
Jeanne's return heartens the French army, allowing a counter-attack against Les Tourelles. However, to protect Jeanne from being injured again, Montmorency initially orders her to stay far from the battlefield, but when Philippe returns to battle Jeanne decides to face her and the two Ulysses face each other in a dramatic duel. Further inspired by Montmorency, the French launch a frontal assault, breaking the English first line and opening the way to Montmorency. Being at disadvantage, Philippe successfully makes Jeanne lower her guard by revealing to her the supposed night of love Montmorency had with her cousin, and to save her life Montmorency has no choice but swallow the other half of the stone, becoming a Ulysses himself. In a desperate attempt to kill Jeanne, Glasdale ends up piercing Philippe, falling with her in the Loire when the bridge collapses, and at that point the rest of the English army surrenders. However, while the French are still exulting, black clouds cover everything, and a shocked Astaroth says that the Philosopher's Stone has gone out of control, opening the gates of Hell above Earth.
| 10 | "Beast of the Apocalypse"; Transliteration: "Mokushiroku no Kemono" (Japanese: 黙示録の獣) | December 16, 2018 |
While the French retreat taking a fainted Jeanne with them, Montmorency tries to stop the massive monster appeared from a place beyond time and space, but the beast ultimately enters his body and claims it. While unconscious, Montmorency has visions of an old battle between the demon-like monster and a priest supported by Astaroth, that exiled him to another world using the stone at the cost of his life, subsequently linking the fairy to the relic to become its guardian. At the same time Flamel reaches the bridge, revealing himself to be the last of the Templars, an organization created by humans to find and destroy every Philosopher's Stone in the world, in order to stop these so-called Gods (which are implied to be aliens from another world and creators of the human race) from threatening the humans. The old alchemist tries to fight against the demon, but the creature eventually kills him; La Hire takes his place after having pierced herself with the sword Joyouse to gain Ulysses powers, but even like this she is quickly defeated. Then it's Jeanne's turn, and while fighting with her, Montmorency returns to himself for a moment, begging his friends to kill him. At that point, the demon tries to put him to sleep again showing him visions of the future, where Montmorency sees the fate waiting Jeanne in Rouen.
| 11 | "Utopia, Then..."; Transliteration: "Rakuen, soshite..." (Japanese: 楽園、そして...) | December 23, 2018 |
The demon, who proves to be the ancient Sumerian God Enlil, completely takes control of Montmorency's body and his powers, calling to Earth his inter-dimensional servants to help him extinguish human race. Jeanne and La Hire try to face him again, but La Hire is eventually critically wounded, leaving the sole Jeanne able to fight. At that point, Philippe and Glasdale too join the battle, trying to use the power of Glasdale's Lance of Longinus to kill Elil at the cost of Philippe's life. Jeanne stops the arrow to not sacrifice other lives, and thanks to Philippe the Pucelle manages to kiss Enlil in a desperate attempt to awake Montmorency. Like this, Jeanne is able to meet Montmorency in the subconscious of his past where Enlil has trapped him, but the boy initially doesn't recognize her. After many attempts Jeanne manages to make him remember everything, but even like this Montmorency refuses to wake up, since he doesn't want to come back now that he knows what Jeanne's destiny is. Jeanne, however, moves him to believe that future is not already written, and that they can try to change it, and at that point Montmorency awakes, throwing Enlil out of his body.
| 12 | "In This Wonderful World"; Transliteration: "Kono subarashī sekai ni" (Japanese: この素晴らしい世界に) | December 30, 2018 |
Joining forces, Montmorency and Jeanne succeed in defeating Enlil, sending him back into his dimensional prison. While Jeanne is still exhausted from the battle, the phantom of the last Duke of Burgundy once again tries to pursue Philippe to kill Jeanne; at that point, Philippe begs Glasdale to kill her before being subjugated again by the Saint Grail's thirst for blood, but the knight forcefully removes the relic from her, saving Philippe from her curse of being the Black Ulysses (later it will be revealed that the helmet has not been destroyed, however Philippe has no stamina to follow the ghost's voice). With Orléans and Les Tourelles officially lost, Malory commands the remnants of the English Army, led by John Talbot to retreat by Bedford's order, claiming that their lord is secretly preparing a counter-offensive to change tides of the war once again and destroy Jeanne's legend at the same time. While Orléans celebrates the end of the siege, Jeanne and the others return to Chinon, and Charlotte makes Montmorency Maréchal de France, entrusting to him the duty to protect both Jeanne and the Valois from the conspirators still hiding among them. Under Jeanne and Montmorency's lead, the French army defeats the English in Patay opening the way toward Reims, where Charlotte is officially crowned Queen of France.
