= Yūko Ōno =

Japanese voice actress

- 大野 柚布子
- Born: November 2, 1993 (age 32); Nagoya, Aichi Prefecture, Japan
- Education: Kogakuin University
- Occupation: Voice actress
- Years active: 2016–present
- Agent: Mausu Promotion
- Height: 160 cm (5 ft 3 in)

Yūko Ōno (大野 柚布子, Ōno Yūko; born November 2, 1993) is a Japanese voice actress from Nagoya, Aichi Prefecture, Japan. She is known for her roles as Yuzu in Konohana Kitan and Aya Asagiri in Magical Girl Site.

== Biography ==
Ono attended Kogakuin University. After moving to Tokyo in 2013, she entered the drama department of Nihon Kogakuin College, and in 2015 became a training student for the Mausu Promotion's Affiliate Training School.

In April 2017, she became a member of Mausu Promotion.

On November 7, 2018, the company announced a temporary closure to concentrate on treatment for health reasons through Mausu Promotion. On January 7, 2019, Ono announced that she would return to work while monitoring the progress of the treatment. On October 31, 2024, she announced her hiatus.

== Filmography ==
=== Anime ===
2017

- Angel's 3Piece! - Jun Gotō
- Konohana Kitan - Yuzu

2018

- Magical Girl Site - Aya Asagiri
- Ongaku Shōjo - Hiyo Yukino
- Ulysses: Jeanne d'Arc and the Alchemist Knight - Jeanne d'Arc

2019

- Tenka Hyakken ~Meiji-kan e Yōkoso!~ - Jōizumi Masamune

2020

- Infinite Dendrogram - Nemesis
- Tsugu Tsugumomo - Azami
- Lapis Re:Lights - Kaede
- The Misfit of Demon King Academy - Maia Zemut

2021

- Yuki Yuna is a Hero - Aya Kokudo
- Lupin III Part 6 - Emi

2023

- The Misfit of Demon King Academy II - Maia Zemut
- Apparently, Disillusioned Adventurers Will Save the World - Lynn

2024

- Love Is Indivisible by Twins - Ririsu Kamedake

=== Films ===
2016

- Planetarian: The Reverie of a Little Planet - Boy

=== Video games ===
- WHITEDAY - Hina Kisaragi
- Tenka Hyakken - Jouizumi Masamune
- Tower of Princess
- Alternative Girls - Belulu
- Samurai Shodown - Rimururu
- Fire Emblem: Three Houses - Flayn
- Yuki Yuna is a Hero: Hanayui no Kirameki - Aya Kokudo
- Azur Lane - Oyashio, Kuroshio
- The King of Fighters All Star - Rimururu
- Girls' Frontline - Tabuk
- Blue Reflection: Second Light - Kirara Kuno
- Atelier Sophie 2: The Alchemist of the Mysterious Dream - Dumortier
- 100% Orange Juice! - Watty
