= Yosakoi =

Japanese style of dance

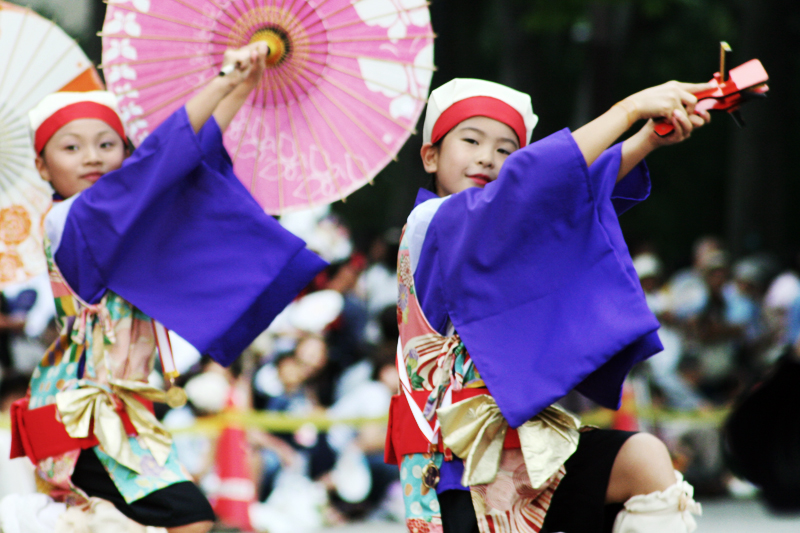
Two performers at the 2006 Yosakoi Festival in Harajuku, Tokyo

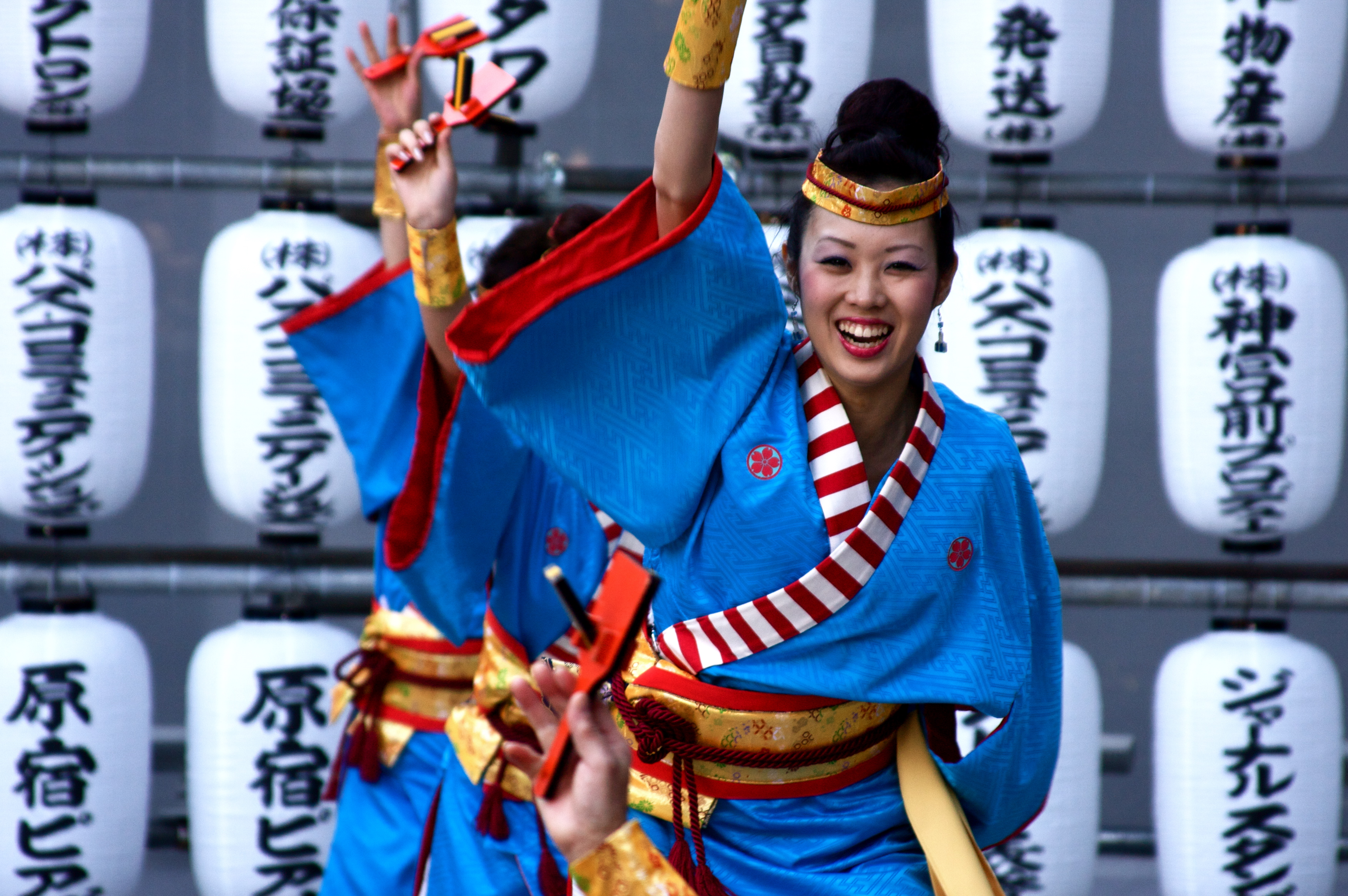
A performer at the 2008 Yosakoi Festival in Harajuku

Yosakoi (よさこい) is a unique style of dance that originated in Japan and that is performed at festivals and events all over the country. The first yosakoi festival was held in 1954 in Kōchi, Japan, on the island of Shikoku. Yosakoi-style dancing has spread throughout much of Japan. The style of dance is highly energetic, combining traditional Japanese dance movements with modern music. The choreographed dances are often performed by large teams. Along with a number of professional yosakoi schools and town dance teams, yosakoi is also a popular event during the sports festivals held by Japanese elementary, junior, and senior high schools. Its participants include men and women of almost all ages – sometimes within a single team.

== Costumes and naruko ==
A group of yosakoi dancers dancing down a street, with naruko clappers and large flags waving

The costumes used by yosakoi teams vary widely. Happi coats and yukata are the most predominant costumes and can be seen in a wide variety of colors. However, some groups choose costumes that are based on historical attire, popular fashions, or ethnic fashions. Typically, all members of a team wear similar costumes.

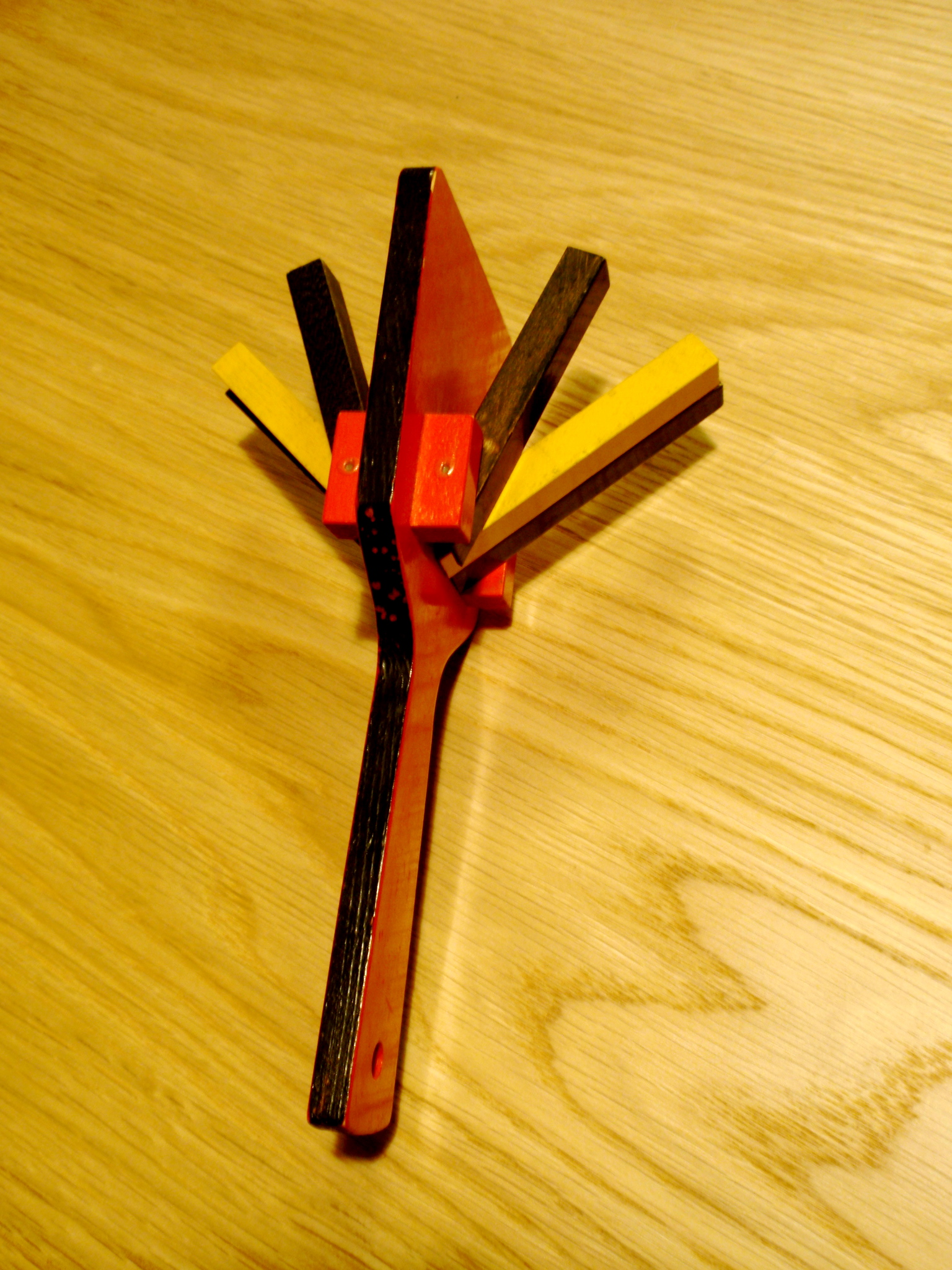
A naruko (bird rattle), showing its range of movement

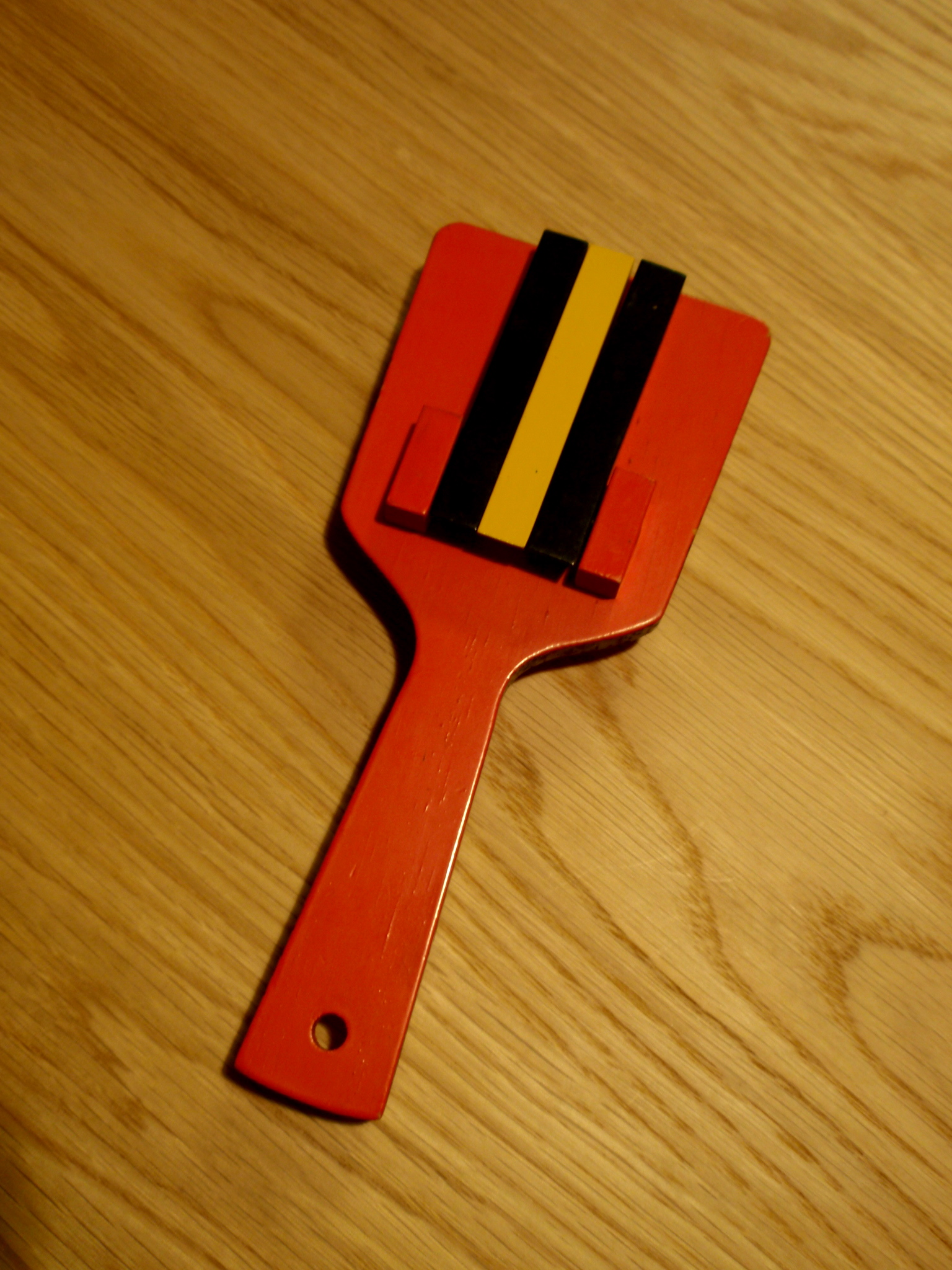
A closed naruko

One of the defining aspects of yosakoi dance is the use of naruko: small wooden clappers that are held in the hands of each dancer. Naruko were originally used in Kōchi Prefecture to scare birds away from rice fields. The traditional naruko has black and yellow beaters on a wooden body, but most modern yosakoi groups create their own naruko, choosing colors and materials that match their costumes. The use of naruko is required in traditional yosakoi dance, but many groups also use other hand-held instruments or props, such as drums, other percussion instruments, flags, batons, and floats.

== Yosakoi Naruko Dancing ==
The official yosakoi dance is based on a song called "Yosakoi Naruko Dancing", written by Eisaku Takemasa. This song was created by combining elements of three songs: "Yosakoi-bushi" ("yosakoi melody"), "Yocchore" (a children's song), and "Jinma-mo" (a folk song of Kōchi Prefecture). The original competition in Kōchi requires that each team's music include some part of this original music. Competitions and festivals in other areas may not have this requirement (thus allowing teams to compose their own music), or may require that elements of different local folk songs are worked into the dance routines. Takemasa has given the copyright on "Yosakoi Naruko Dancing" to the public.

== Yosakoi Matsuri ==
Yosakoi Matsuri ("yosakoi festival") is a festival in the city of Kōchi, Japan. The original yosakoi festival, it has taken place every August since 1954, except 2020 due to COVID-19. In this festival, teams of dancers and floats crowd to dance the yosakoi naruko dance together. The number of participants has increased yearly: as of 2005 over 10,000 dancers participate in this competition every year.

The rules of the Kōchi yosakoi competition are as follows:

- Participants must use the naruko clappers in the dance
- Any musical arrangement is acceptable, but the music must contain at least some part of Takemasa's original "Yosakoi Naruko Dancing" song
- Teams are limited to 150 participants

== Growth ==
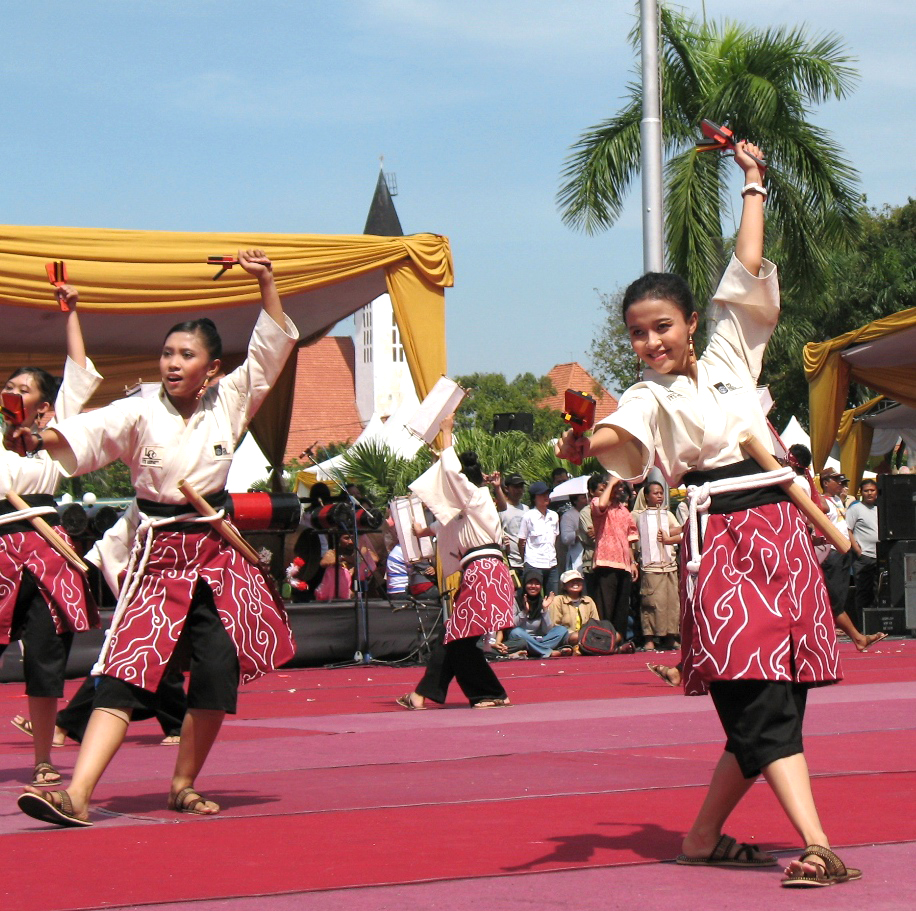
Yosakoi dance performed by Institut Teknologi Sepuluh Nopember team in Surabaya, Indonesia

Since its introduction in 1954, yosakoi has become popular throughout the country of Japan. Yosakoi festivals are now held all over Japan throughout the year. They vary in size from small villages hosting a few teams of dancers in conjunction with another annual festival, to large cities like Sendai, which hosts the Michinoku Yosakoi Festival, the third largest festival in Japan.

As of 2005, there were yosakoi festivals and competitions in over 200 locations.

- In Tōkyō, the Harajuku Omotesando Genki Matsuri Super Yosakoi is a two-day yosakoi festival that takes place in five locations in Harajuku and Yoyogi Park. This festival has occurred annually since 2001.
- The Sakado, Saitama Yosakoi started in 2001 with 67 teams and 4600 participants. The 11th festival was in 2011.
- Sapporo, Hokkaido held its inaugural Yosakoi Sōran Festival in 1992. The 16th festival began on June 6, 2007, in Odori Park and other venues.
- Sasebo, Nagasaki hosts the largest Yosakoi festival on Kyushu at the end of every October.
- Yosakoi has appeared on the television drama "Kinpachi Sensei" (3年B組金八先生).
- In Surabaya, there is an annual Yosakoi competition. In 2007, the prize was presented by the mayor of Kōchi, Seiya Okazaki.
- In Sekolah Alam Shah, Putrajaya, Malaysia, during the Form 1 Cultural Night one of six sport houses will perform yosakoi.
- In Lethbridge, Alberta, Canada, the first-ever North American International Yosakai Festival occurred at the Nikka Yuko Japanese Garden during late September, 2025.

An example of yosakoi dancing can be seen in the feature film The Harimaya Bridge, which was filmed in Kōchi Prefecture. The 2011 manga series, Hanayamata, which received an anime adaptation in July 2014, also focuses on yosakoi.

=== Internationally ===
Yosakoi has been celebrated in Penang - a UNESCO Heritage City in Malaysia every year since 2013. It was originally held in March to commemorate the Japan Tohoku Earthquake but has since changed its schedule to the 2nd Saturday of September. The event is organised by local enthusiasts called the Pink Hibiscus together with the Penang City Council with over multiple teams (27 teams in 2023) from all over Malaysia and SE Asia participating in what is now known as the Penang Yosakoi Parade held at Karpal Singh Drive, Penang. Yosakoi is also celebrated as well as in Accra, Ghana as an annual celebration to strengthen ties between Japan and Ghana.

In Vietnam, yosakoi is performed annually in Japan Sakura Matsuri which is usually held in April in Hanoi by Japan Foundation Vietnam (JPF) to introduce Japanese culture. This festival showed over 10 enthusiastic Yosakoi teams of Vietnam and guest teams from Japan. Yosakoi also appears in anime-manga-cosplay events in large cities such as Hanoi, Ho Chi Minh City and Haiphong. Up to now, there are total 4 Vietnamese yosakoi teams participating in Harajuku Omotesando Super Yosakoi Festival, including Hanoi Sennen Yosakoi Team, Nakama Yosakoi Team, Hanuyo and Nui Truc Sakura Yosakoi Team. Nui Truc Sakura Yosakoi Team is the first Vietnamese Yosakoi's team to participating at Yosakoi Matsuri in Kochi along with another International team from France.

There are also yosakoi teams at universities outside Japan, such as UC Berkeley, Kansas State University., Minnesota State University Moorhead, and in New York City In Canada, a team called Sakuramai performs locally at cultural events and fairs in Toronto and Montreal.

In Europe, one can learn and dance Yosakoi in France, Poland, Sweden, Germany, the UK, Hungary, Czech Republic or Estonia. The first european team is French and was created back in 2010 and perform in several festivals, including the International Fair of Bordeaux.
