= Small Nozomi and Big Yume =

Japanese manga series

- First tankōbon volume cover

小さいノゾミと大きなユメ (Chiisai Nozomi to Ōki na Yume)
- Genre: Comedy; Slice of life
- Manga
- Written by: Sou Hamayumiba
- Published by: Kodansha
- English publisher: NA: Kodansha USA (digital)
- Imprint: Morning KC
- Magazine: Monthly Morning Two
- Original run: May 22, 2019 – January 22, 2021
- Volumes: 3

Small Nozomi and Big Yume (Japanese: 小さいノゾミと大きなユメ, Hepburn: Chiisai Nozomi to Ōki na Yume) (Note: The names of the characters have similar meanings, with nozomi (望み) meaning "wish; desire" and yume (夢) meaning "dream; ambition".) is a Japanese manga series written and illustrated by Sou Hamayumiba. It was serialized in Kodansha's seinen manga magazine Monthly Morning Two from May 2019 to January 2021, with its chapters collected in three tankōbon volumes.

== Publication ==
Written and illustrated by Sou Hamayumiba, Small Nozomi and Big Yume was serialized in Kodansha's seinen manga magazine Monthly Morning Two from May 22, 2019, to January 22, 2021. Kodansha collected its chapters in three tankōbon volumes, released from October 23, 2019, to March 23, 2021.

In North America, Kodansha USA licensed the manga for an English digital release.

=== Volumes ===
| No. | Original release date | Original ISBN | English release date | English ISBN |
|---|---|---|---|---|
| 1 | October 23, 2019 | 978-4-06-516807-3 | May 16, 2023 | 978-1-68491-810-2 |
| 2 | September 25, 2020 | 978-4-06-520048-3 | June 20, 2023 | 978-1-68491-811-9 |
| 3 | March 23, 2021 | 978-4-06-522848-7 | July 18, 2023 | 978-1-68491-812-6 |

== See also ==
- Dropout Idol Fruit Tart, another manga series by the same author
- Hanayamata, another manga series by the same author
