= Takako Tanaka =

Japanese voice actress

- 田中 貴子
- Born: October 5 Fukui Prefecture, Japan
- Occupation: Voice actress
- Years active: 2017–present
- Agent: Mausu Promotion
- Known for: Hinamatsuri as Hina Nitta

Takako Tanaka (田中 貴子, Tanaka Takako; born October 5, 1994) is a Japanese voice actress from Fukui Prefecture who is affiliated with Mausu Promotion. She made her voice acting debut in 2017, and in 2018 played her first main role as Hina Nitta in the anime television series Hinamatsuri.

== Filmography ==
=== Anime ===
2017

- Akiba's Trip: The Animation as Clerk, Reporter
- Atom: The Beginning as Female university student (episode 6)
- Aikatsu Stars! as Alice Carroll
- 18if as Eriko
- Welcome to the Ballroom
- Konohana Kitan as Child (episode 7)

2018

- The Disastrous Life of Saiki K. as Female student
- Pop Team Epic as Insta Girl B (episode 9)
- Aikatsu Friends! as Himari Hirata
- Hinamatsuri as Hina Nitta
- Crayon Shin-chan as Kindergartner F
- Space Battleship Tiramisu as Child
- Island as Emiri Sunada, Emily Snyder
- Gundam Build Divers as Diver
- Ms. Vampire Who Lives in My Neighborhood as Friend A (episode 1)
- The Girl in Twilight as Boy
- Puzzle & Dragons as Child C
- As Miss Beelzebub Likes as Female employee (episode 8)

2019

- Hitori Bocchi no Marumaru Seikatsu as Futago Nosaki
- Wasteful Days of High School Girls as Student (episode 5)
- Granbelm as Infant
- Aikatsu on Parade! as Alice Carroll

2020

- Interspecies Reviewers as Roana
- King's Raid: Successors of the Will as Ophelia
- Dropout Idol Fruit Tart as Rua Nakamachi
- Healin' Good Pretty Cure as Riri

2021

- Muv-Luv Alternative as Miki Tamase
- Deep Insanity: The Lost Child as EL-Cee

2022

- Delicious Party Pretty Cure as Iroha Endo

2023

- Soaring Sky! Pretty Cure as Shoko Amano

2025

- There's No Freaking Way I'll be Your Lover! Unless... as Kaho Koyanagi
- Shabake as Yanari

2026

- Medalist 2nd Season as Sakina Anaguma

=== Video games ===
2019

- Fire Emblem: Three Houses as Annette Fantine Dominic

2020

- 100% Orange Juice! as Maynie

2023

- Da Capo 5 as Yuyu Matsuzaki

2025

- The Hundred Line: Last Defense Academy as Turamtammi
