= Lapis Re:Lights =

Japanese multimedia franchise

ラピスリライツ ～この世界のアイドルは魔法が使える～ (Rapisu Riraitsu: Kono Sekai no Idol wa Mahō ga Tsukaeru)
- Genre: Idol, magical girl, music
- Created by: Project Parallel
- Manga
- Written by: Hiroichi
- Published by: ASCII Media Works
- Magazine: Dengeki Daioh
- Original run: October 26, 2019 – January 27, 2021
- Volumes: 2
- Anime television series
- Directed by: Hiroyuki Hata
- Produced by: Keisuke Fukunaga; Yuuma Oogami; Kenjirou Yokoyama; Chiaki Tanimoto; Jun Kosaka; Kenta Motohashi; Tomohiro Tanaka; Keisuke Kaminaga; Jin Qian
- Written by: Hajime Asano; Kasumi Tsuchida
- Music by: Satoshi Hōno
- Studio: Yokohama Animation Laboratory
- Licensed by: Crunchyroll (Note: In North America through Crunchyroll, LLC (formerly known as Funimation).): SA/SEA: Muse Communication
- Original network: Tokyo MX, BS11, AT-X
- Original run: July 4, 2020 – September 19, 2020
- Episodes: 12

Lapis Re:Lights (Japanese: ラピスリライツ ～この世界のアイドルは魔法が使える～, Hepburn: Rapisu Riraitsu: Kono Sekai no Idol wa Mahō ga Tsukaeru; lit. "Lapis Re:Lights: Idols in This World Can Use Magic"), stylized as Lapis Re:LiGHTs, is a Japanese multimedia franchise created by KLab and Kadokawa Corporation. It features a scenario written by Hajime Asano and character designs by U35. It includes a smartphone game for Android and iOS devices, a manga adaptation by Hirochi and Shingo Nagai, novels, music releases, and live events. An anime television series by Yokohama Animation Laboratory aired from July to September 2020.

== Plot ==
Tiara is a young princess who dreams of becoming a witch. As a result, she decides to enroll at Flora Girls Academy, a prestigious magic school. Once she arrives there, Tiara reunites with her childhood friend Rosetta, who is also attending the school, and befriends three other students named Lavie, Ashley, and Lynette. Due to their test score, they are given the rank of Lapis. Facing expulsion if they fail, the group will try to avoid this by becoming idols while they learn how to use magic.

== Characters ==
=== LiGHTs ===
Tiara (ティアラ)
Voiced by: Yukari Anzai
A princess who has come to a magic school to study. She hides her princess status from her friends as she wishes to have a normal school life.
Rosetta (ロゼッタ, Rozetta)
Voiced by: Risa Kubota
Tiara's childhood friend who is also studying in the magic school.
Lavie (ラヴィ, Ravi)
Voiced by: Live Mukai
Ashley (アシュレイ, Ashurei)
Voiced by: Iori Saeki
Lynette (リネット, Rinetto)
Voiced by: Mizuki Yamamoto

=== IV KLORE ===
Emilia (エミリア, Emiria)
Voiced by: Hazuki Hoshino
A succubus student.
Alpha (あるふぁ, Arufa)
Voiced by: Tomomi Mineuchi
A magic doll.
Salsa (サルサ, Sarusa)
Voiced by: Yū Sasahara
A werewolf student.
Garnet (ガーネット, Gānetto)
Voiced by: Yōko Nakayama
A ghost student.

=== Konohana wa Otome (この花は乙女) ===
Nadeshiko (ナデシコ)
Voiced by: Rina Honnizumi
Tsubaki (ツバキ)
Voiced by: Arisa Suzuki
Kaede (カエデ)
Voiced by: Yūko Ōno

=== Sugar Pockets ===
Ratura (ラトゥーラ, Ratūra)
Voiced by: Yukimi Hayase
Champe (シャンペ, Shianpe)
Voiced by: Seika Hirose
Maryberry (メアリーベリー, Mearīberī)
Voiced by: Hikaru Akao

=== Sadistic★Candy ===
Angelica (アンジェリカ, Anjerika)
Voiced by: Yuka Amemiya
A member of Sadistic★Candy. She is actually Angers from Ray.
Lucifer (ルキフェル, Rukiferu)
Voiced by: Risae Matsuda

=== supernova ===
Yue (ユエ)
Voiced by: Yū Sakuragi
Millefeuille (ミルフィーユ, Mirufīyu)
Voiced by: Saeko Oku
Fiona (フィオナ)
Voiced by: Haruka Itou

=== Ray ===
Eliza (エリザ, Eriza)
Voiced by: Kana Hanazawa
The leader of Ray and Tiara's older sister.
Chloe (クロエ, Kuroe)
Voiced by: Yoshino Nanjō
Angers (あんじぇ, Anje)
Voiced by: Yuka Amemiya
A member of Ray. Following Ray's disbandment, she became a member of Sadistic★Candy under the name Angelica.
Camilla (カミラ, Kamira)
Voiced by: Sumire Uesaka
Yuzuriha (ユズリハ)
Voiced by: Ayane Sakura

== Media ==
=== Manga ===
A manga by Hiroichi was serialization in Dengeki Daioh from October 26, 2019, to January 27, 2021.

==== Volumes ====
| No. | Release date | ISBN |
|---|---|---|
| 1 | July 22, 2020 | 978-4-04-913285-4 |
| 2 | March 26, 2021 | 978-4-04-913708-8 |

=== Anime ===
The 12-episode animated series was directed by Hiroyuki Hata at Yokohama Animation Laboratory with Taro Ikegami serving as the chief animation director and character designer. The scripts of the series were overseen by Kasumi Tsuchida and Hajime Asano, and the music was composed by Satoshi Hōno. "Lapis Re:LiGHTs Stars" performed the opening theme "Watashi-tachi no Startrail" (私たちのSTARTRAIL; "Our Startrail"), while LiGHTs performed the ending theme "Planetarium" (プラネタリウム, "Puranetarimu"). It aired from July 4 to September 19, 2020, on Tokyo MX and BS11. Funimation acquired the series, and streamed it on its website in North America and the British Isles, and on AnimeLab in Australia and New Zealand. Muse Communication licensed the series in South and Southeast Asia.

==== Episodes ====
| No. | Title | Original air date |
|---|---|---|
| 1 | "Legendary academy" | July 4, 2020 |
| 2 | "Accord chase" | July 11, 2020 |
| 3 | "Plucky bump" | July 18, 2020 |
| 4 | "Identity" | July 25, 2020 |
| 5 | "Sunny day" | August 1, 2020 |
| 6 | "Ruin Explorers" | August 8, 2020 |
| 7 | "Luminous hope" | August 15, 2020 |
| 8 | "Instinct orchestra" | August 22, 2020 |
| 9 | "Gradience" | August 29, 2020 |
| 10 | "Honorable princess" | September 5, 2020 |
| 11 | "Top concern" | September 12, 2020 |
| 12 | "Specificity ornament" | September 19, 2020 |

=== Game ===
A free-to-play mobile game developed by KLab for iOS and Android devices was launched on December 14, 2021. The service ended on October 31, 2022.
