= Hanayamata =

Japanese manga series

- Cover of the first tankōbon volume, featuring Naru Sekiya.

ハナヤマタ
- Genre: Comedy, slice of life
- Manga
- Written by: Sou Hamayumiba
- Published by: Houbunsha
- Magazine: Manga Time Kirara Forward
- Original run: April 23, 2011 – February 24, 2018
- Volumes: 10
- Anime television series
- Directed by: Atsuko Ishizuka
- Written by: Reiko Yoshida
- Music by: Monaca: Keigo Hoashi; Ryūichi Takada
- Studio: Madhouse
- Licensed by: AUS: Madman Entertainment; NA: Sentai Filmworks; UK: Manga Entertainment
- Original network: TV Tokyo, TVO, TVA, AT-X
- English network: SEA: Aniplus Asia
- Original run: July 8, 2014 – September 23, 2014
- Episodes: 12
- Video game

Hanayamata: Yosakoi Live!
- Developer: Bandai Namco Games
- Publisher: Bandai Namco Games
- Genre: Rhythm, visual novel
- Platform: PlayStation Vita
- Released: JP: November 13, 2014

Hanayamata (ハナヤマタ; also stylized as HaNaYaMaTa) is a Japanese manga series by Sou Hamayumiba. It was serialized in Houbunsha's seinen manga magazine Manga Time Kirara Forward from April 2011 to February 2018, with its chapters collected in ten tankōbon volumes. An anime television series adaptation by Madhouse aired in Japan from July to September 2014.

== Plot ==
Naru Sekiya is an ordinary 14-year-old middle school girl who likes fairy tales, but is worried about her lack of other interests. She has a chance encounter with a "fairy", a foreign girl practicing dance at night. On a spur of the moment, Naru asks to join her and is introduced to the world of yosakoi dancing. The series' title is a portmanteau (combination) of the first two letters of the girls' first names: Hana, Naru, Yaya, Machi, and Tami.

== Characters ==
=== Main characters ===
Naru Sekiya (関谷 なる, Sekiya Naru)
Voiced by: Reina Ueda (Japanese); Caitlynn French (English)
A 14-year-old girl who considers herself extremely average. Aside from reading fairy tales, she doesn't have many interests outside of practising iaido at home. She lacks confidence to bring herself out of her routine life, but upon encountering Hana and taking up yosakoi, she starts to change little by little. Her favorite flower is the cherry blossom.
Hana N. Fountainstand (ハナ・N・フォンテーンスタンド, Hana Enu Fontēnsutando)
Voiced by: Minami Tanaka (Japanese); Luci Christian (English)
An excitable American girl who transfers into Naru's class. Having become fascinated with yosakoi following a trip to Japan when she was young, she decided to move there and form her own yosakoi club, inviting Naru to join her. She lives with her father, who is divorced from her mother who lives in America. She has a tomboyish personality and tends to get a little over excited, sometimes dancing in dangerous locations. Although she almost returned to America, her friends managed to convince her to stay in Japan. Her favorite flower is the bluestar.
Yaya Sasame (笹目 ヤヤ, Sasame Yaya)
Voiced by: Kaya Okuno (Japanese); Monica Rial (English)
Naru's best friend whose parents run a noodle shop. She possesses both brains and beauty, making her very popular at her school, but has messy handwriting. She is particularly clingy towards Naru and gets jealous when she becomes friendly with others. She is initially hesitant towards yosakoi and joins the club in name only, but after her dream of being part of a band falls apart, she understands she has a place to belong and joins the club in earnest. Her favorite flower is the rose.
Tami Nishimikado (西御門 多美, Nishimikado Tami)
Voiced by: Yuka Ōtsubo (Japanese); Cynthia Martinez (English)
The student council vice-president at Naru's school. As both of their fathers were acquaintances, she and Naru grew up together, with Naru regarding her as a big sister. She is quite fond of her father, often being accused of having an Electra complex, and had spent most of her time focusing on becoming a proper Japanese woman in order to please him. However, Naru soon helps her to overcome her worries and she joins the yosakoi club. Her favorite flower is the lily.
Machi Tokiwa (常盤 真智, Tokiwa Machi)
Voiced by: Manami Numakura (Japanese); Carli Mosier (English)
The student council president and Tami's close friend, who is the younger sister of Sally. Whilst generally strict, she is particularly weak to sweet things, as well as Tami's general requests. She is initially hostile towards Sally for leaving home, but she soon comes to understand her true feelings and joins the yosakoi club. Her favorite flower is the sunflower.

=== Yosakoi Club ===
Sally Tokiwa (常盤 沙里, Tokiwa Sari)
Voiced by: Megumi Toyoguchi (Japanese); Molly Searcy (English)
Sally Tokiwa is Naru, Yaya, and Hana's homeroom and English teacher and Machi's older sister; she is nicknamed 'Sally-sensei'. She originally planned to take over her parents' hospital together with Machi, but after helping Machi with studying, Sally chose to leave home, inspired to become a teacher instead. She becomes the yosakoi's club advisor, initially showing little interest but soon becoming more involved, including trying to make the girls wear cosplay while performing, though she is occasionally shown to be lazy and forgetful.

=== Need Cool Quality band ===
An anime original band, the Need Cool Quality was the band joined by Yaya, the drummer of the band, Sachiko, Arisa and Yuka before its disbandment due to personal issues of Sachiko, Arisa and Yuka and the failure of the band in a light music band audition.

Sachiko Yamanoshita (山ノ下 祥子, Yamanoshita Sachiko)
Voiced by: Yuki Wakai (Japanese); Brittney Karbowski (English)
Lead vocalist and the guitarist of the band.
Arisa Kajiwara (梶原 亜里沙, Kajiwara Arisa)
Voiced by: Ayano Yamamoto (Japanese); Margaret McDonald (English)
Co-vocalist and the guitarist of the band.
Yūka Komachi (小町 結香, Komachi Yūka)
Voiced by: Maika Takai (Japanese); Juliet Simmons (English)
Bass player of the band.

=== Supporting characters ===
Masaru Ofuna (大船 勝, Ōfuna Masaru)
Voiced by: Tsuyoshi Koyama (Japanese); John Gremillion (English)
A 33-year-old bachelor who runs the Yosakoi Masaru shop. Despite having an appearance like that of a bald yakuza, he is quite friendly and eager to help those learning yosakoi. He is affectionately called "Big Brother" (兄貴, Aniki) by Hana.
Hana's father
Voiced by: Yūji Ueda (Japanese); Leraldo Anzaldua (English)
Jennifer N. Fountainstand (ジェニファー・N・フォンテーンスタンド, Jenifa Enu Fontēnsutando)
Voiced by: Chiaki Takahashi (Japanese); Tiffany Grant (English)
Hana's mother.
Naomasa Sekiya (関谷 直正, Sekiya Naomasa)
Voiced by: Toru Ohkawa (Japanese); David Wald (English)
Naru's father.
Tami's father
Voiced by: Hiroki Tōchi (Japanese); David Matranga (English)
Yaya's father
Voiced by: Kōsuke Gotō (Japanese); John Swasey (English)
Ume-san (梅さん, Ume-san)
Voiced by: Toshiko Maeda (Japanese); Joanne Bonasso (English)
Tami's housemaid.

== Media ==
=== Manga ===
Hanayamata, written and illustrated by Sou Hamayumiba, was serialized in Houbunsha's Manga Time Kirara Forward magazine from April 23, 2011, to February 24, 2018. It was collected into ten tankōbon volumes from December 12, 2011, to April 12, 2018.

No.	Release date	ISBN
01	December 12, 2011	978-4-8322-4089-6
02	July 12, 2012	978-4-8322-4167-1
03	April 12, 2013	978-4-8322-4285-2
04	January 10, 2014	978-4-8322-4392-7
05	July 11, 2014	978-4-8322-4461-0
06	September 12, 2014	978-4-8322-4478-8
07	August 11, 2015	978-4-8322-4602-7
08	August 10, 2016	978-4-8322-4731-4
09	June 12, 2017	978-4-8322-4841-0
10	April 12, 2018	978-4-8322-4937-0

=== Anime ===
An anime television series adaptation produced by Madhouse aired in Japan from July 8 to September 23, 2014, and was simulcast by Crunchyroll. (Note: TV Tokyo listed the series premiere at 25:35 on July 7, 2014, which is July 8 at 1:35 a.m.) The opening theme is "Hana wa Odoreya Iroha ni Ho" (花ハ躍レヤいろはにほ; "Dancing in the Scent of Flowers") by Team "Hanayamata" (Reina Ueda, Minami Tanaka, Kaya Okuno, Yuka Ōtsubo, and Manami Numakura), while the ending theme is "Hanayuki" (花雪; "Snowflake") by smileY inc. (composed of vocalist Yuka Ōtsubo and musician Yuuyu). The same ending theme is also performed by Team "Hanayamata" in episode 12. Furthermore, an insert song, "Kodoku Signal" (コドクシグナル; "Signal of Solitude") by Need Cool Quality (Kaya Okuno, Yuki Wakai, Ayano Yamamoto and Maika Takai) is used in the first episode.

In September 2015, Sentai Filmworks announced they had acquired the license of the series in North America. Later that month, it was revealed that the DVD and Blu-ray of Hanayamata would be released on January 19, 2016, as well as getting an official English dub. The series has also been licensed in both the United Kingdom and the Republic of Ireland by Animatsu Entertainment and in Australasia by Madman Entertainment.

==== Episode list ====
No.	Title (Note: All English titles are taken from Crunchyroll.)	Directed by (Note: Information is taken from the ending credits of each episode.)	Original release date
1	"Shall We Dance?"; Transliteration: "Sharu Wi Dansu?" (Japanese: シャル・ウィ・ダンス？)	Atsuko Ishizuka	July 8, 2014
Naru Sekiya is a middle school girl who, besides a fascination with fairy tales, considers herself average in almost every regard, particularly in comparison to her friend Yaya Sasame, who is the drummer in an amateur band. Whilst walking home from an errand late at night, Naru comes across a blonde haired girl dancing in the moonlight, believing her to be a fairy and asking her to take her to another world. The girl invites Naru to dance with her, but Naru isn't confident enough and runs off, inadvertently taking a paddle with her. The next day, the girl, who turns out to be an American transfer student named Hana N. Fountainstand, starts asking Naru if she would like to partake in yosakoi with her, but Naru is too intimidated by her forwardness and rejects her. The next day, as Hana continues to try to find members for a yosakoi club, she explains to Naru that even though she's having no luck in finding any members, she wants to pursue her dream of becoming a true yosakoi dancer because it is her decision. Naru laments that she has no such interests to speak of and considers herself empty, but Hana tells her that it simply means she has plenty of room to discover new things. Moved by her words and admitting she had fun dancing with her, Naru offers to help Hana recruit members for her club and becomes friends with her.
2	"Jealousy Rose"; Transliteration: "Jerashī rōzu" (Japanese: ジェラシー・ローズ)	Kinsei Nakamura	July 15, 2014
Hana comes over to Naru's house to discuss how to attract more club members, where she reveals a bit more about herself and teaches Naru about the paddle yosakoi dancers use, the naruko. Meanwhile, Yaya becomes noticeably jealous as Naru starts spending more and more time with Hana. When Yaya's jealousy leads her to inadvertently insult Naru, questioning her ability to take yosakoi seriously, Naru argues back at her, determined to prove she is capable of learning yosakoi within a week. Wanting the two to make up, Hana takes Yaya to watch Naru's practice, showing that even though Naru is struggling to get the moves down, she continues to try hard in order to meet Yaya's approval. Realising the error of her ways, Yaya stays to watch Naru's awkward but admirable dance and manages to make up with her.
3	"Girls' Style"; Transliteration: "Gāruzu sutairu" (Japanese: ガールズ・スタイル)	Hideki Hosokawa	July 22, 2014
Naru and Hana visit the Yosakoi Masaru shop run by Masaru Ōfuna, who proves to be quite hospitable despite his intimidating appearance and offers some beginner yosakoi tips. Learning of an upcoming yosakoi festival, the girls resume their recruiting efforts, but are informed by student council president Machi Tokiwa that in order to be recognised an official club, they need at least four members and an advisor. Hana approaches their homeroom teacher, Sally, who tells them to get two more members before asking about becoming their advisor. During the weekend, Hana is introduced to Naru's childhood friend, Tami Nishimikado, who shows an interest in their performance. The next day, Hana shows up at Yaya's soba restaurant, crashing in on Yaya's plans to watch movies alone with Naru. Yaya ends up hanging out with Hana, hearing from her about how she wants to make the most out of her life by doing fun things, only to completely miss her date with Naru. The next day, Machi appears before the girls, informing them they are not allowed to use the rooftop to practise without permission.
4	"Princess/Princess"; Transliteration: "Purinsesu purinsesu" (Japanese: プリンセス・プリンセス)	Hiroya Saitō	July 29, 2014
As Tami helps the others with their situation, Hana contemplates inviting her to join the yosakoi club. Later that night, Naru accompanies Tami, mentioning how Hana and Yaya helped give her the courage to move forward. The next day, Naru and Hana show Tami their yosakoi and, upon seeing her ballet skills, ask her to join the club. However, Tami feels obligated to her current lessons and turns them down, believing joining the club would disappoint her father. As Tami becomes more conflicted, having given up many things she loved for the sake of becoming a proper woman to make her father happy, Naru comforts her, wanting to help her and be by her side, giving Tami the courage to talk with her father about what she truly wants.
5	"First Step"; Transliteration: "Fāsuto suteppu" (Japanese: ファースト・ステップ)	Kotono Watanabe	August 5, 2014
After Tami joins the yosakoi club, the group manage to convince Yaya to join in name only, allowing the club to become official with Sally as their advisor. Later, the girls decide to attend a yosakoi festival being held in Shōnan as their first club activity. With some time until the performance, Yaya and Tami spend some time getting to know each other, with Tami explaining how Naru taught her it's more fun to spend time with others than by yourself. As the festival gets underway, with Masaru also taking part, the girls pay close attention to another middle school yosakoi team that Masaru had helped out, inspiring Naru and the others to aim for the Hanairo Festival.
6	"Try, Try, Try"; Transliteration: "Torai torai torai" (Japanese: トライ・トライ・トライ)	Akira Shimizu	August 12, 2014
As the girls are tasked with coming up with a concept for their club, Naru, upon hearing from her father about how flowery she has become lately, decides to base her concept around flowers. Having decided on Naru's theme, Hana asks Sally for permission to perform at a department store event. Sally agrees on the condition that the club both show the results of their yosakoi practice and score high enough in their exams. Despite studying hard, Hana alone falls short on her exam results, upsetting her greatly. Encouraged by the others not to give up, Hana continues to work hard on both yosakoi and improving her worse subjects. When their class expresses interest in yosakoi, the girls put on an improvised performance. Admiring the effort Hana and the others put in, Sally approves of their department event and decides to become a bit more active as their advisor. Meanwhile, Yaya and her bandmates are shocked to learn they did not pass their audition.
7	"Girl Identity"; Transliteration: "Gāru aidentitī" (Japanese: ガール・アイデンティティー)	Fumihiro Yoshimura	August 19, 2014
With the girls needing some costumes for their performance, Tami manages to get Machi to let them use some old costumes from the former rakugo club. Meanwhile, Yaya becomes depressed when her band decides to break up following their failed audition and starts avoiding the others. Learning what happened to the band, Naru and Hana try to console Yaya, but she lashes out at them, saying she hates everyone and doesn't want to be friends with Naru anymore. Not wanting things to end like this, Naru and Hana use a bold movement to bring Yaya to the rooftop, where Yaya confesses she was jealous of Naru being able to gain friends. Realising she has a place alongside Naru and the others, Yaya decides to become a more earnest member of the yosakoi club.
8	"Mission Event"; Transliteration: "Misshon ibento" (Japanese: ミッション・イベント)	Hideki Hosokawa	August 26, 2014
Naru and Tami start exercising to try and lose weight in time for the event, though they soon learn the extra weight is because of stronger muscles. Meanwhile, Yaya uses her musical know-how to arrange Tami's composition, helping the girls focus on their choreography. On the day of the event, the group discover Sally had accidentally put the CD they need in her personal bag, so she sends her sister, who turns out to be Machi, to bring it to them in time for their performance. As the girls step up on stage to perform, with Machi invited to spectate, Naru starts to panic when the group starts falling off tempo and ends up messing up when she is reminded of a traumatic elementary school event.
9	"Sister Complex"; Transliteration: "Shisutā konpurekkusu" (Japanese: シスター・コンプレックス)	Osamu Sekita	September 2, 2014
Yaya and the others manage to encourage Naru to finish the performance, but shortly afterwards, Hana collapses. After Hana makes a full recovery after a few days, Naru still feels guilty for letting her fear of an audience ruin the performance, but is encouraged by her friends to keep trying. Later, the group learn from Machi that their club is in danger of being shut down at the end of the term since, as a substitute teacher, Sally can't be an official advisor. As the girls try to think of a way to keep Sally as their advisor, Machi feels hostility towards Sally, who left home when she got tired of trying to live up to her parents' expectations. The next day, as the girls hear rumor that Sally may be quitting as a teacher, Machi assumes she is abandoning them just like she allegedly did with her and badmouthes her. After some stubbornness, Machi eventually learns from Tami that Sally was actually applying to become a full-time teacher, stating that it was Machi who inspired her to become a teacher. Upon hearing this, Machi apologises to Sally, who manages to pass her exam, and contemplates joining the yosakoi club herself.
10	"Hot Spring Camp"; Transliteration: "Onsen gasshuku" (Japanese: オンセン・ガッシュク)	Kinsei Nakamura	September 9, 2014
Machi decides to join the yosakoi club, determined to help the group get into shape before the Hanairo Festival. Tami proposes they go on a training camp at her family's hot spring inn, so the girls discuss their plans at Hana's house, where they learn she lives with her father after her parents got divorced. After everyone works to update their choreography and rōtines to include Machi, the girls head to the inn and get straight to practising. Later that night, the girls suddenly learn they've missed the registration date for the festival. Nonetheless, Machi is still determined to spend every waking minute practising so she can catch up with the others, encouraging the others to practise alongside her. Their practise soon attracts the attention of the other inn guests, who give the girls their support. The next day, Sally informs the girls that Masaru has managed to get them into the festival thanks to a team dropping out. Back at school, as Naru manages to come up with a theme for their outfits, Hana gets a call from her mother.
11	"Smile is Flower"; Transliteration: "Sumairu izu furawā" (Japanese: スマイル・イズ・フラワー)	Kotono Watanabe	September 16, 2014
After the girls practise by the poolside, Hana reveals her mother has come to Japan, though seems to be hiding the real reason she is so down about it. Later, Yaya comes up with some lyrics for everyone to sing during their performance, encouraging everyone to work hard, while Hana remains unable to tell them what's bothering her. That night, Hana goes over to Naru's house and tells her she will be unable to participate in the festival because she has to return to America with her mother, who is getting back together with her father. With Hana conflicted over choosing between her friends and her family, Naru tells her to seek out her own happiness. Hana leaves the next morning, leaving Naru a letter which she shares with the others. Determined not to let things end like this, Naru and the others rush to the airport in order to see Hana off. After Hana leaves on her flight, leaving Naru her spare naruko, Naru and the others become determined to practise hard for the festival in Hana's place.
12	"Hanayamata"; Transliteration: "Hanayamata" (Japanese: ハナヤマタ)	Atsuko Ishizuka	September 23, 2014
As the girls practice for the festival, they give a copy of their music composition to Hana's father, inviting him to come to their performance. The next day, as the festival gets underway, the girls try to spend as much time practising before their turn to perform, noticing Naru has begun to sparkle more ever since meeting Hana. Later that day, Yaya's former bandmates pay her a little visit to encourage her. Just before their performance, Naru receives a call from Hana who, having been told about the CD from her father, managed to convince her mother to let her return to Japan to perform with her friends. With her car stuck in traffic with just half an hour until the performance, Hana rushes on foot through the town and, with help from Sally, Masaru, and a policeman, manages to make it just in time to perform alongside everyone. After a successful performance, Hana decides to try and convince her parents to let her stay in Japan, with the group making plans for their next big performance.

=== Video games ===
An adventure/rhythm game based on the series, titled Hanayamata: Yosakoi Live! (ハナヤマタ よさこいLIVE！), was developed by Bandai Namco Games and released for the PlayStation Vita on November 13, 2014. The game was also available in a limited edition containing a bonus Blu-ray Disc and an original drama CD. Characters from the series appear alongside other Manga Time Kirara characters in the 2018 mobile RPG, Kirara Fantasia.

== See also ==
- Dropout Idol Fruit Tart – Another manga series by the same author
- Small Nozomi and Big Yume – Another manga series by the same author
