= Manami Numakura =

Japanese voice actress

- 沼倉 愛美
- Born: April 15, 1988 (age 38); Yokohama, Kanagawa Prefecture, Japan
- Occupations: Voice actress; singer
- Years active: 2008–present
- Agent: Arts Vision
- Height: 162 cm (5 ft 4 in)
- Spouse: Ryōta Ōsaka (m. 2019)
- Children: 1
- Musical career
- Genres: J-Pop; Anison
- Instrument: Vocals
- Years active: 2016–2020
- Label: FlyingDog
- Website: numakuramanami.com

Manami Numakura (沼倉 愛美, Numakura Manami; born April 15, 1988) is a Japanese voice actress and former singer. She is affiliated with Arts Vision. Her best-known role is in The Idolmaster video game franchise where she voices Hibiki Ganaha from the rival group known as Project Fairy. Other major roles include Hinata Sakaguchi in That Time I Got Reincarnated as a Slime, Pieck Finger in Attack on Titan, Kohaku in Dr. Stone, Mary in No Guns Life, Riko in Love Lab, Takao in Arpeggio of Blue Steel, Machi Tokiwa in Hanayamata and Saya Endō in Dagashi Kashi. She made her solo music debut in 2016, performing the opening theme to the anime series Magical Girl Raising Project. From 2013 to 2016, she was a member of the voice acting unit Trident.

== Career ==
Numakura decided to become a voice actress while in high school after listening to a drama CD lent to her by a friend who liked anime; she also became a fan of the Gundam franchise during this time and she cited this as another reason for her deciding to become a voice actress.

Numakura made her voice acting debut in 2008 after auditioning for a role in the franchise The Idolmaster; she was cast as the character Hibiki Ganaha. She made her anime voice acting debut in 2009, playing the role of a student in an episode of the anime series Gintama. She would primarily voice background and supporting roles until 2011, when she played Hibiki in the anime adaptation of The Idolmaster.

In 2012, Numakura was cast as the role of Arata Obata in the anime series Black Rock Shooter and as the role of Yurika Tōdō in the franchise Aikatsu!. In 2013 she played the role of Riko Kurahashi in the anime series Love Lab and the role of Takao in the anime series Arpeggio of Blue Steel. Numakura, together with Mai Fuchigami and Hibiku Yamamura, formed the singing unit Trident, which performed songs for Arpeggio of Blue Steel. In 2014 she played Nanami Tokou in the anime series Brynhildr in the Darkness and Aoi Sakurai in the anime series Rail Wars! and Machi Tokiwa in the anime series Hanayamata. In 2015, she was cast as the character Paula McCoy in the anime series Nisekoi. In 2016, she was cast as the character Saya Endō in the anime series Dagashi Kashi and as Kano Sazanami in the anime series Magical Girl Raising Project. Trident disbanded in 2016 following the release of its last album Blue and a final concert at the Makuhari Messe Hall. In 2017, she was cast as Akane Hiyama in the anime series Love Tyrant.

Numakura made her debut as a solo music artist under the Flying Dog label in 2016. Her first single "Sakebe" (叫べ, Shout) was released on November 2, 2016; the title song is used as the opening theme to the anime television series Magical Girl Raising Project. Her second single "Climber's High!" was released on February 8, 2017; the title song is used as the opening theme to the anime series Fuuka, where Numakura plays the role of Tama. Numakura opened her official fanclub Area Nu in April 2017, and she released her first album My Live on June 14, 2017. She made an appearance at Animelo Summer Live in 2016 and she made an appearance at Animax Musix 2018. She released her second album Ai (アイ) on February 20, 2019.

On November 25, 2019, Numakura announced that she would be ending her solo singing career after the release of a compilation album titled Minna de! (みんなで!) on February 12, 2020, and her final concert at Toyosu Pit on February 16, 2020, although she will continue her activities as a voice actress. Her fanclub is set to close in March of the same year.

== Personal life ==
Numakura announced her marriage to fellow voice actor Ryōta Ōsaka on October 23, 2019. She announced that she gave birth to her first son on December 19, 2021.

== Filmography ==
=== Anime ===
List of voice performances in anime
Year	Series	Role	Notes	Source
2009	Gin Tama	Student A	Ep. 188	
2010	Hanamaru Kindergarten	Kenji		
2011	Nichijou	Mihoshi Tachibana		
2011	Sket Dance	Ayano Sugisaki		
2011	Yondemasuyo, Azazel-san			
2011	Hoshizora e Kakaru Hashi	Keita Yamakawa		
2011	Zoobles!	Panky		
2011	Bunny Drop			
2011	The Idolmaster	Hibiki Ganaha	Also OVAs and specials	
2011	Tamayura: Hitotose	Shōko Hirono		
2012	High School DxD	Marion		
2012	Black Rock Shooter	Arata Kohata		
2012	Sengoku Collection	Yumi		
2012	Shirokuma Cafe	Mizuki		
2012	Natsuiro Kiseki	Asano-senpai, others		
2012	Moyasimon Returns	A. Soe, Kobo		
2012–16	Aikatsu!	Yurika Tōdō		
2013–14	Puchimas! Petit Idolmaster	Hibiki Ganaha, Chibiki	web series, also sequels and OVAs	
2013	Sasami-san@Ganbaranai	Jō Edogawa		
2013	A Certain Scientific Railgun S	Yumi Kusakabe	Ep. 4	
2013	Love Lab	Riko Kurahashi		
2013	Arpeggio of Blue Steel	Takao		
2014	Harmonie	Mayumi	Anime Mirai 2014 short film	
2014	Riddle Story of Devil	Otoya Takechi		
2014	Brynhildr in the Darkness	Nanami Tokou		
2014	Rail Wars!	Aoi Sakurai		
2014	Hanayamata	Machi Tokiwa		
2014–15	Shirobako	Yumi Iguchi, Poppy, Noa, others		
2015	Unlimited Fafnir	Mitsuki Mononobe		
2015–16	Assassination Classroom	Rio Nakamura		
2015–21	Show by Rock!!	Retoree		
2015–16	The Heroic Legend of Arslan	Alfreed		
2015	Sound! Euphonium	Mamiko Oumae		
2015	Nisekoi:	Paula McCoy		
2015–18	Overlord	Narberal Gamma		
2015	Lance N' Masques	Yoriko Sudo		
2016–18	Dagashi Kashi	Saya Endō		
2016	Pandora in the Crimson Shell: Ghost Urn	Clarion		
2016	Schwarzesmarken	Circe Steinhoff		
2016	Magical Girl Raising Project	Ripple / Kano Sazanami	eps. 1- (Ripple), 1, 3, 7, 9 (Kano Sazanami)	
2016	Seisen Cerberus: Ryūkoku no Fatalite	Mumuu		
2017	Seiren	Tomoe Kamita		
2017	Fuuka	Tama Reika		
2017	Love Tyrant	Akane Hiyama		
2017	Made in Abyss	Shiggy		
2017	Konohana Kitan	Kiri		
2017	A Sister's All You Need	Ashley Ōno		
2018	Slow Start	Kiyose Enami		
2018	Shinkansen Henkei Robo Shinkalion	Akita Oga		
2018	Gundam Build Divers	Aya Fujisawa / Ayame		
2018	Uchi no Maid ga Uzasugiru!	Tsubame Kamoi		
2018	Release the Spyce	Yuki Hanzōmon		
2018	Ulysses: Jeanne d'Arc and the Alchemist Knight	Arthur de Richemont		
2018	Fairy Tail	Brandish μ		
2019	Mini Toji	Miruya Kitora		
2019–23	Attack on Titan	Cart Titan / Pieck Finger		
2019	If It's for My Daughter, I'd Even Defeat a Demon Lord	Rita		
2019–present	Dr. Stone	Kohaku		
2019	Kochoki: Wakaki Nobunaga	Ohana		
2019–20	No Guns Life	Mary Steinberg		
2020–22	Princess Connect! Re:Dive	Tamaki / Tamaki Miyasaka		
2020	Plunderer	Erin	Eps. 20–21	
2020	Adachi and Shimamura	Akira Hino		
2021	Yo-kai Watch Jam – Yo-kai Academy Y: Close Encounters of the N Kind	Chiyo Fukuda, Lana Amate		
2021	That Time I Got Reincarnated as a Slime	Hinata Sakaguchi		
2021	Seven Knights Revolution: Hero Successor	Shirley		
2021	I've Been Killing Slimes for 300 Years and Maxed Out My Level	Beelzebub		
2022	She Professed Herself Pupil of the Wise Man	Hinata		
2022	Shin Ikki Tousen	Indara		
2022	Mamekichi Mameko NEET no Nichijō	Tabi, A-chan		
2022	Legend of Mana: The Teardrop Crystal	Diana		
2023	By the Grace of the Gods Season 2	Robelia		
2023	Alice Gear Aegis Expansion	Yotsuyu Hirasaka		
2023	Demon Slayer: Kimetsu no Yaiba – Swordsmith Village Arc	Tokitō siblings' mother		
2024	A Salad Bowl of Eccentrics	Brenda Aisaki		
2025	Tojima Wants to Be a Kamen Rider	Emily	Eps. 1	
2026	A Misanthrope Teaches a Class for Demi-Humans	Karin Ryuzaki		

=== Film ===
List of voice performances in anime
Year	Series	Role	Notes	Source
2015	Arpeggio of Blue Steel: Ars Nova DC	Takao	feature film	
2015	Ghost in the Shell: The New Movie	Tsumugi (young)		
2015	Pandora in the Crimson Shell: Ghost Urn	Clarion		
2017	Fairy Tail: Dragon Cry	Brandish μ		

=== Video games ===
List of voice performances in video games
Year	Series	Role	Notes	Source
2009–	The Idolmaster series	Hibiki Ganaha	Starting with The Idolmaster SP	
2009	Puzzle: Boku ra no 48-jiken senso パズル－ぼくらの48時間戦争	Keiko Takigawa		
2012	Touch, Shot! Love Application ja:たっち、しよっ! 〜Love Application〜	Natsu		
2012	WonderKing Online			
2012	Mugen Souls	Alys Levantine		
2012	Atelier Elkrone: Dear for Otomate	Kaya		
2012	Kidō Senshi Gundam SEED Battle Destiny			
2012	Agarest Senki Mariage ja:アガレスト戦記 Mariage	Ka Kaoru		
2013	Demon Gaze	Pine		
2013	Mugen Souls Z	Alys Levantine		
2013	Killer Is Dead	Scarlett		
2013	Lord of Vermillion III	Freya		
2014	Dai ransō dasshu or dasshu! ! ja:大乱走ダッシュor奪取!!	Ai Tensakamari		
2014	ja:RE:VICE【D】	Violet		
2014	Hanayamata: Yosakoi Live!	Machi Tokiwa	PS Vita	
2015	Tokyo Xanadu	Rion Kugayama		
2016	Tokyo Xanadu: eX+	Rion Kugayama		
2016	Girls' Frontline	AN-94, FP6	Mobile Games	
2017	Azur Lane	Benson, Dorsetshire, Sovetskaya Rossiya, Surcouf		
2018-	Princess Connect Re:Dive	Tamaki / Tamaki Miyasaka		
2019	Another Eden	Rosetta		
2019	Sakura Wars	Lancelot		
2021	Blue Archive	Karin Kakudate		
2021	Counter:Side	Estarossa de Chevalier		
2022	Atelier Sophie 2: The Alchemist of the Mysterious Dream	Katrina Balbastre		
2025	Xenoblade Chronicles X: Definitive Edition	Liesel		
2026	Street Fighter 6	Ingrid		

=== Audio dramas ===
List of voice dub performances in audio drama productions
Series	Role	Notes	Source
Puchimasu! Petit Idolmaster Drama CD	Hibiki Ganaha		
Star Mine	Kazami Hoshino		
Super Star: Me to Me	Mika Tachibana		

=== Overseas dubbing ===
List of voice dub performances in overseas productions
Series	Role	Notes	Source
August			
iCarly			
The Pacific			

== Discography ==
=== Studio albums ===
Title	Album details	Peak chart positions	Sales
Title	Album details	JPN	Sales
My Live	Released: June 14, 2017; Label: FlyingDog; Formats: CD+Blu-ray disc, CD, digital download, streaming	7	JPN: 7,000
Ai	Released: February 20, 2019; Label: FlyingDog; Formats: CD+Blu-ray disc, CD, digital download, streaming	31	

=== Compilation albums ===
Title	Album details	Peak chart positions	Sales
Title	Album details	JPN	Sales
Minna de!	Released: February 12, 2020; Label: FlyingDog; Formats: 2CD+Blu-ray disc, digital download, streaming	30	

=== Singles ===
List of singles as lead artist (continued)
Title	Year	Peak chart positions		Sales	Album
Title	Year	JPN	JPN Hot 100	Sales	Album
"Sakebe"	2016	19	45	JPN: 9,000	My Live
"Climber's High!"	2017	20	37	JPN: 8,500	My Live
"Color"	2018	25	— (Note: "Color" did not enter the Billboard Japan Hot 100, but peaked at number 25 on the Top Singles Sales chart.)	JPN: 3,600	Ai
"Desires"	2018	23	— (Note: "Desires" did not enter the Billboard Japan Hot 100, but peaked at number 27 on the Top Singles Sales chart.)	JPN: 2,300	Ai
"Anna ni Issho Datta no ni" (from CrosSing)	2024	—	—		Non-album single

=== Character song recordings ===
List of character albums, extended plays and singles, with selected chart positions
Title	Album details	Peak positions
Title	Album details	JPN
The Idolmaster Master Artist 2 -First Season- 02 Ganaha Hibiki (as Hibiki Ganaha)	Released: November 3, 2010; Label: Nippon Columbia; Cat. No.: COCX-36511; Formats: CD, digital download	24
The Idolmaster Master Artist 3 02 Ganaha Hibiki (as Hibiki Ganaha)	Released: April 22, 2015; Label: Nippon Columbia; Cat. No.: COCX-39142; Formats: CD, digital download	4
Petit Idolmaster Twelve Seasons! Vol. 10: Ganaha Hibiki & Chibiki (as Hikibi Ganaha)	Released: March 6, 2013; Label: Frontier Works; Cat. No.: MFCZ-1037; Formats: CD, digital download	18
Ongaku Shoujo「Rock the Hero」 (as Haru Chitose)	Released: March 29, 2013; Label: Cosmic Record; Cat. No.: CORE-00012; Formats: CD, digital download	–
Yosakoi Song Series Go Machi Yui Hama gakuen chūgaku yo-sa koi bu Tokiwa Machi	Released: November 19, 2014; Label: Diveii Entertainment; Cat. No.: AVCA-74544; Formats: CD, digital download	57
