= Dropout Idol Fruit Tart =

Japanese manga series

- First tankōbon volume cover, featuring (clockwise) Ino Sakura, Hayu Nukui, Nina Maehara, and Roko Sekino

おちこぼれフルーツタルト (Ochikobore Furūtsu Taruto)
- Genre: Comedy; Idol; Music
- Manga
- Written by: Sou Hamayumiba
- Published by: Houbunsha
- Magazine: Manga Time Kirara Carat (Note: Dropout Idol Fruit Tart debuted as a guest series in the January to March 2015 issues of Houbunsha's Manga Time Kirara Carat magazine, which were released from November 28, 2014 to January 28, 2015.)
- Original run: May 28, 2015 – July 28, 2026
- Volumes: 9
- Anime television series
- Directed by: Keiichiro Kawaguchi
- Written by: Keiichiro Kawaguchi; Tatsuya Takahashi
- Music by: Monaca
- Studio: Feel
- Licensed by: Crunchyroll (Note: In North America through Crunchyroll, LLC (formerly known as Funimation).)
- Original network: AT-X, Tokyo MX, SUN, KBS, BS-NTV
- Original run: October 12, 2020 – December 28, 2020
- Episodes: 12

Dropout Idol Fruit Tart (おちこぼれフルーツタルト, Ochikobore Furūtsu Taruto) is a Japanese four-panel manga series written and illustrated by Sou Hamayumiba. It was serialized in Houbunsha's seinen manga magazine Manga Time Kirara Carat from May 2015 to July 2026, with its chapters collected in nine tankōbon volumes. An anime television series adaptation by Feel aired from October to December 2020.

== Plot ==
Ino Sakura, a girl from Okayama Prefecture, decides to head to Tokyo in order to realize her dream of becoming an idol. Once she arrives there, she moves into a dormitory called Mouse House where she meets Roko Sekino, a former child actor, Hayu Nukui, a musician, and Nina Maehara, a model. When their manager, Hoho Kajino, informs them that Mouse House has been threatened to be demolished, the girls quickly form a new idol group called Fruit Tart in order to save their home.

== Characters ==
=== Fruit Tart ===
Ino Sakura (桜 衣乃, Sakura Ino)
Voiced by: Hiyori Nitta (Japanese); Kira Buckland (English)
A girl from Okayama Prefecture who moves to Tokyo to become an idol. She idolized Roko as a child and is surprised to learn that she is also a member of Fruit Tart.
Roko Sekino (関野 ロコ, Sekino Roko)
Voiced by: Risa Kubota (Japanese); Sarah Anne Williams (English)
A former child actor who gained fame for singing a promotional song about broccoli, a gig that she now regrets. She has a complex about her small size, amplified by how much taller her sister Chiko is despite being younger.
Hayu Nukui (貫井 はゆ, Nukui Hayu)
Voiced by: Haruka Shiraishi (Japanese); Laura Stahl (English)
A musician and Ino's classmate. She is from a rich family and ran away from home as pursuing a singing career was against her family's wishes, although they later agree to sponsor Fruit Tart's show.
Nina Maehara (前原 仁菜, Maehara Nina)
Voiced by: Reina Kondō (Japanese); Xanthe Huynh (English)
A model who is Roko's childhood friend. Roko and Hayu have a complex about her large breasts.
Hemo Midori (緑 へも, Midori Hemo)
Voiced by: Kyōka Moriya (Japanese); Kayli Mills (English)
A newcomer idol who transfers to Rat Productions and becomes Fruit Tart's fifth member.

=== Cream Anmitsu ===
Chiko Sekino (関野 チコ, Sekino Chiko)
Voiced by: Kaoru Sakura (Japanese); Amanda Turen (English)
The leader of Cream Anmitsu and Roko's younger sister. She appears to have a sister complex for Roko and is a fan of Fruit Tart's online show.
Nua Nakamachi (中町 ぬあ, Nakamachi Nua)
Voiced by: Yū Sasahara (Japanese); Stephanie Sheh (English)
Rua's twin sister.
Rua Nakamachi (中町 るあ, Nakamachi Rua)
Voiced by: Takako Tanaka (Japanese); Brianna Knickerbocker (English)
Nua's twin sister.

=== Other characters ===
Hoho Kajino (梶野 穂歩, Kajino Hoho)
Voiced by: Yoko Hikasa (Japanese); Christina Kelly (English)
Fruit Tart's manager. Though she works with shady motives from time to time, she pulls through somehow as manager.
Tone Honmachi (本町 利音, Honmachi Tone)
Voiced by: Yuiko Tatsumi (Japanese); Lizzie Freeman (English)
Ino and Hayu's classmate who is a fan of Fruit Tart. She later becomes an assistant for the group.
Riri Higashi (東 リリ, Higashi Riri)
Voiced by: Rena Maeda (Japanese); Ryan Bartley (English)
A childhood friend of Hoho's who works as the producer of Cream Anmitsu.
Oto Kogane (小金 乙, Kogane Oto)
Voiced by: Yui Horie (Japanese); Jackie Lastra (English)
The acting president of Cat Productions.

== Media ==
=== Manga ===
Written and illustrated by Sou Hamayumiba, Dropout Idol Fruit Tart debuted as a guest series in the January to March 2015 issues of Houbunsha's Manga Time Kirara Carat magazine, which were released from November 28, 2014, to January 28, 2015. The series was then serialized from May 28, 2015, to July 28, 2026. Houbunsha collected its chapters in nine tankōbon volumes, released from April 27, 2016, to August 27, 2026. Houbunsha published an anthology of the series on October 27, 2020.

==== Volumes ====
No.	Release date	ISBN
1	April 27, 2016	978-4-8322-4690-4
2	May 27, 2017	978-4-8322-4835-9
3	June 27, 2018	978-4-8322-4955-4
4	October 25, 2019	978-4-8322-7130-2
5	September 25, 2020	978-4-8322-7206-4
6	February 25, 2022	978-4-8322-7349-8
7	July 27, 2023	978-4-8322-7472-3
8	December 25, 2024	978-4-8322-9595-7
9	August 27, 2026	978-4-8322-9743-2

=== Anime ===
The 12-episode anime television series adaptation was announced in the May issue of Manga Time Kirara Carat on March 28, 2019. The series was animated by Feel and directed by Keiichiro Kawaguchi, with Kawaguchi and Tatsuya Takahashi handling series composition, and Sumie Kinoshita designing the characters. Monaca composed the series' music. It was set to premiere in July 2020, but it was delayed until October 2020 due to the COVID-19 pandemic. Hiyori Nitta, Risa Kubota, Haruka Shiraishi, Reina Kondō, and Kyōka Moriya performed the opening theme song "Kibō Darake no Everyday!", as well as the ending theme song "Wonder!" as their characters. The series aired from October 12 to December 28, 2020, on AT-X and other channels.

Funimation acquired the series and streamed it on its website in North America and the British Isles, and on AnimeLab in Australia and New Zealand. On October 17, 2021, Funimation announced that the series would receive an English dub, which premiered the following day.

==== Episodes ====
No.	Title (Note: English translated titles are taken from Funimation.)	Directed by	Written by	Original release date
1	"We're off to Higako!"; Transliteration: "Ittekimasu Higako!" (Japanese: いってきますヒガコ！)	Takafumi Fujii	Keiichirō Kawaguchi; Tatsuya Takahashi	October 12, 2020
2	"A Rocking New Semester!"; Transliteration: "Rokkuna Shingakki!" (Japanese: ろっくなしんがっき！)	Nao Miyoshi	Takayo Ikami	October 19, 2020
3	"Our First Concert!"; Transliteration: "Hajimete no Raibu!" (Japanese: はじめてのライブ！)	Shōhei Yamanaka	Keiichirō Kawaguchi	October 26, 2020
4	"A New Face!"; Transliteration: "Nyū Feisu!" (Japanese: にゅーふぇいす！)	Tetsuya Watanabe	Keiichirō Kawaguchi	November 2, 2020
5	"Could Be a Stalker?"; Transliteration: "Hon'nori Sutōkā?" (Japanese: ほんのりストーカー？)	Nao Miyoshi	Takayo Ikami	November 9, 2020
6	"The Pervert Appears!"; Transliteration: "Hentai Arawaru!" (Japanese: へんたいあらわる！)	Hiroyuki Tsuchiya	Keiichirō Kawaguchi	November 16, 2020
7	"I Need to Go... Record?"; Transliteration: "Torimasu! Otoire?" (Japanese: とります！おといれ？)	Shōhei Yamanaka	Takayo Ikami	November 23, 2020
8	"Super Awesome Curry!"; Transliteration: "Chō Sugoi Karē!" (Japanese: ちょーすごいカレー！)	Hiroaki Kudō	Keiichirō Kawaguchi	November 30, 2020
9	"Diuretic Effect!"; Transliteration: "Rinyō Sayō!" (Japanese: りにょうさよう！)	Tetsuya Watanabe	Takayo Ikami	December 7, 2020
10	"Dance and Shine!"; Transliteration: "Numenume Odore!" (Japanese: ぬめぬめおどれ！)	Shōhei Yamanaka	Takayo Ikami	December 14, 2020
11	"Look at Us!"; Transliteration: "Rukku Atto Asu!" (Japanese: るっくあっとあす！)	Nao Miyoshi	Keiichirō Kawaguchi	December 21, 2020
12	"Dropout Graduation?"; Transliteration: "Ochikobore Sotsugyō?" (Japanese: おちこぼれそつぎょう？)	Shōhei Yamanaka	Keiichirō Kawaguchi	December 28, 2020

=== Video game ===
Characters from the series appear alongside other Manga Time Kirara characters in the 2020 mobile RPG, Kirara Fantasia.

== See also ==
- Hanayamata – Another manga series by the same author
- Small Nozomi and Big Yume – Another manga series by the same author
