= I'm Standing on a Million Lives =

Japanese manga series

- Volume 1 cover, featuring Yūsuke Yotsuya at the top

100万の命の上に俺は立っている (Hyakuman no Inochi no Ue ni Ore wa Tatte Iru)
- Genre: Dark fantasy; Isekai
- Manga
- Written by: Naoki Yamakawa
- Illustrated by: Akinari Nao
- Published by: Kodansha
- English publisher: NA: Kodansha USA
- Magazine: Bessatsu Shōnen Magazine
- Original run: June 9, 2016 – present
- Volumes: 24
- Anime television series
- Directed by: Kumiko Habara
- Produced by: Akio Matsuda; Terushige Yoshie; Tomoyuki Oowada; Hiroyuki Aoi; Keisuke Satou; Akira Yonezawa; Harumi Satou; Takahiro Fujii (1–12); Sumire Itou (13–24)
- Written by: Takao Yoshioka
- Music by: Ken Itoi
- Studio: Maho Film
- Licensed by: Crunchyroll; SA/SEA: Medialink
- Original network: Tokyo MX, BS11, MBS, AT-X, Wowow
- Original run: October 2, 2020 – September 25, 2021
- Episodes: 24
- icon

I'm Standing on a Million Lives (100万の命の上に俺は立っている, Hyakuman no Inochi no Ue ni Ore wa Tatte Iru) is a Japanese manga series written by Naoki Yamakawa and illustrated by Akinari Nao. It has been serialized in Kodansha's shōnen manga magazine Bessatsu Shōnen Magazine since June 2016. The manga is licensed in North America by Kodansha USA. An anime television series adaptation produced by Maho Film aired from October to December 2020, and a second season aired from July to September 2021.

== Plot ==
Yuusuke Yotsuya, Iu Shindo, and Kusue Hakozaki are transported by a mysterious half-faced creature who tasks them with completing quests for his game within a specific time limit. As a bonus, if they die, they respawn after a quest is complete, if at least one of them survives.

Later, the trio are joined by Yuka Yukitate, Keita Torii and Glenda Carter. after completing missions, they return to their real life until the next quest starts. As a reward for completing quests, the mysterious creature answers any questions they ask. It is revealed that they are playing in countless alternate worlds and alternating sequences..

== Characters ==
Yuusuke Yotsuya (四谷 友助, Yotsuya Yūsuke)
Voiced by: Yūto Uemura (Japanese); Zeno Robinson (English)
An unknown history has caused Yuusuke to be anti-social and selfish. Once in the world of quests, he excuses his actions for a pragmatic and selfish desire to survive. He hates humans, human society, and himself; however, he willingly deludes himself that his decision of who is of value will help better his chance of survival. He has emotions, but he would rather be a psychopath than to follow social norms. He is forced to do good as it is the optimal path to survival due to the way the Game Masters set the challenges to be death or find the right choice.
Iu Shindo (新堂 衣宇, Shindo Iu)
Voiced by: Risa Kubota (Japanese); Jeannie Tirado (English)
One of the few people summoned by the GM. From a troubled background, being bullied and from a biker gang, she plays the game and tries to improve herself.
Kusue Hakozaki (箱崎 紅末, Hakozaki Kusue)
Voiced by: Azumi Waki (Japanese); Valeria Rodriguez (English)
Another summoned by the GM. She was sickly and lacked stamina in her life, so she dreams to be a doctor to find a cure to her situation. She plays the game to improve herself.
Yuka Tokitate (時舘 由香, Tokitate Yuka)
Voiced by: Makoto Koichi (Japanese); Tara Sands (English)
Another summon by the GM. She was initially saved by Yuusuke from a bunch of her tormentors, but became skeptical of him due to his way of helping her. She loved magical girl anime series, inspired her to be a mage.
Kahabell (カハベル, Kahaberu)
Voiced by: Chiwa Saitō (Japanese); Cristina Vee (English)
She was a Knight from Cortanel and an NPC. She joined the group in their quest to deliver cargo. She fell in love with Yuusuke, and sad to see him go after finishing the quest. 15 years later, she had 2 children, lost her sword arm during a campaign against the enemy Deokk Empire, and settled on the city. She had a closure with Yuusuke, accepting the fact that she grew older than him. By the time of the 5th round, she dies of old age.
Majiha Purple (マジハパープル, Majiha Pāpuru)
Voiced by: Kanako Takatsuki
Majiha Pink (マジハピンク, Majiha Pinku)
Voiced by: Ai Furihata
Keita Torii (鳥井 啓太, Torii Keita)
Voiced by: Toshiyuki Toyonaga
Keita was one of the assaulters trying to kill a former drug dealer. Yuusuke prevented the murder, he escaped before the police arrived. With their family's debt settled, he was thankful to Yuusuke. He became a gamer after being summoned by the GM, joining Yuusuke's group.
Yana (ヤーナ, Yāna)
Voiced by: Ayana Taketatsu
One of the island's NPCs. She and Aoyu are the island village's duo ceremonial/ritual dance performers.
Aoyu (アォユー, Aoyū)
Voiced by: Aoi Yūki
One of the island's NPCs. She and Yana are the island village's duo ceremonial/ritual dance performers. She fell in love with Yuusuke and later on confessed to him, wanting to retire and marry him.
Canteele (カンティル, Kantiru)
Voiced by: Shin-ichiro Miki
Mercenary leader. He survived the event. Became a sorcerer by the 6th round. Took Malita to his master. Died by the 7th Round.
Thanzamer (サンザマ, Sanzamā)
Voiced by: Yoshimasa Hosoya
An island native, left the island to be a mercenary warrior. Fought against the Orcs and died after defending the ship where the villagers are from both the Queen and the lava.
Glenda Carter (グレンダ・カーター, Gurenda Kātā)
Voiced by: Saori Hayami
A foreigner who records her adventures with a camera. Became another player summoned by the GM.
Habaki Futashige
A salaryman trying to commit suicide. Became a player after the company went bankrupt and the employee's salaries were taken by the company owners.
Malita
An NPC member of Militia/Vigilate group who fights a shadow war with GuerreroJaguars and Revolucionarios. Lost her family, her best friend Ilana in a botched raid, and hated the fact her former enemies and her friends became allies. Turned into a berserker by the 7th round.

== Media ==
=== Manga ===
I'm Standing on a Million Lives is written by Naoki Yamakawa and illustrated by Akinari Nao. The series began in Kodansha's Bessatsu Shōnen Magazine on June 9, 2016. The series entered its "final decisive battle" on June 9, 2023. Kodansha has collected its chapters into individual tankōbon volumes. The first volume was released on October 7, 2016. As of July 9, 2026, twenty-four volumes have been released.

In North America, the series is licensed for English release by Kodansha USA, who releases both in digital (since July 3, 2018) and print (May 28, 2019) formats.

==== Volumes ====
No.	Original release date	Original ISBN	English release date	English ISBN
1	October 7, 2016	978-4-06-395810-2	May 28, 2019	978-1-63236-821-8
2	March 9, 2017	978-4-06-395878-2	July 23, 2019	978-1-63236-822-5
3	September 17, 2018	978-4-06-510184-1	September 17, 2019	978-1-63236-840-9
4	January 9, 2018	978-4-06-510547-4	September 17, 2019	978-1-63236-841-6
5	June 8, 2018	978-4-06-511573-2	January 21, 2020	978-1-63236-898-0
6	November 9, 2018	978-4-06-513245-6; 978-4-06-514107-6 (LE)	March 17, 2020	978-1-63236-911-6
7	April 9, 2019	978-4-06-514870-9	September 8, 2020	978-1-63236-912-3
8	September 9, 2019	978-4-06-516443-3	November 24, 2020	978-1-64651-048-1
9	March 9, 2020	978-4-06-518513-1	February 23, 2021	978-1-64651-049-8
10	September 9, 2020	978-4-06-520592-1	May 11, 2021	978-1-64651-156-3
11	December 9, 2020	978-4-06-521677-4	September 21, 2021	978-1-64651-276-8
12	July 9, 2021	978-4-06-524016-8	March 22, 2022	978-1-64-651421-2
13	December 9, 2021	978-4-06-526272-6	April 11, 2023	978-1-64-651575-2
14	May 9, 2022	978-4-06-527831-4	May 30, 2023	978-1-64-651576-9
15	October 7, 2022	978-4-06-529403-1	August 1, 2023	978-1-64-651577-6
16	March 9, 2023	978-4-06-531035-9	November 7, 2023	978-1-64-651704-6
17	August 8, 2023	978-4-06-532602-2	March 5, 2024	978-1-64-651898-2
18	January 9, 2024	978-4-06-534165-0	November 26, 2024	979-8-88-877304-8
19	June 7, 2024	978-4-06-535792-7	July 28, 2026	979-8-88-877449-6
20	November 8, 2024	978-4-06-537421-4	—	—
21	April 9, 2025	978-4-06-539052-8	—	—
22	September 9, 2025	978-4-06-540695-3	—	—
23	February 9, 2026	978-4-06-542593-0	—	—
24	July 9, 2026	978-4-06-544336-1	—	—
25	December 9, 2026	978-4-06-546195-2	—	—

=== Anime ===
An anime television series adaptation was announced on March 3, 2020. It was produced by Maho Film and directed by Kumiko Habara, with Takao Yoshioka writing the scripts, Eri Kojima and Toshihide Masudate designing the characters, and Ken Ito composing the music. The series aired from October 2 to December 18, 2020, on Tokyo MX and other channels. Kanako Takatsuki performed the opening theme song "Anti world", while Liyuu performed the ending theme song "Carpe Diem". The series ran for 12 episodes. Crunchyroll streamed the series worldwide outside of Asia. In Southeast Asia and South Asia, Medialink licensed the anime and streamed it on its Ani-One YouTube channel and iQIYI.

On December 18, 2020, shortly after the first season's finale aired, a second season was announced and aired from July 10 to September 25, 2021. Nijisanji VTuber Kaede Higuchi performed the second season's opening theme song "Baddest", while Takatsuki performed the second season's ending theme song "Subversive".

On May 18, 2021, it was announced Sentai Filmworks picked up the home video rights.

==== Episodes ====
===== Season 1 =====
No. overall	No. in season	Title	Directed by (Note: Information is taken from the ending credits of each episode.)	Written by	Storyboarded by	Original release date
1	1	"Unqualified Heroes"; Transliteration: "Yūsha Shikkaku" (Japanese: 勇者失格)	Kumiko Habara	Takao Yoshioka	Kumiko Habara	October 2, 2020
Shindou Yuu is an amateur model at the top of her class, and Hakozaki Kusue is a physically weak girl who misses school a lot. One moment, Yotsuya Yuusuke is thinking that the sight of these two together seems unusual... and the next, he finds himself in another world. Suddenly Hakozaki, a warrior who can't even swing a sword, and Yotsuya, whose only weapons are a hoe and a sickle, are a party with zero combat experience stuck with the task of defeating a powerful troll.
2	2	"This City I Hate So Much"; Transliteration: "Daikirai na Kono Machi o" (Japanese: 大嫌いなこの街を)	Tomihiko Ōkubo	Takao Yoshioka	Tomihiko Ōkubo	October 9, 2020
Shindou and Hakozaki are unable to revive after being eaten by a troll. In the midst of fighting alone to raise his level, Yotsuya is upgraded to a new job class: Chef. He uses his new job skills to save the two girls, and the three of them finally defeat the troll. Their reward is a glimpse of what the world will look like after they complete all ten quests...
3	3	"Help Me"; Transliteration: "Atashi o Tasukete" (Japanese: あたしを助けて)	Takeyuki Yanase	Takao Yoshioka	Takeyuki Yanase	October 16, 2020
After being told by the Game Master to hit on a certain girl, Yotsuya sneaks into the girls' restroom of an unfamiliar high school and saves Tokitate Yuka from being bullied by her classmates. Tokitate turns out to be the fourth party member. When she's summoned into the other world, Tokitate develops a deep admiration for Shindou, whom she sees as much stronger and prettier than herself.... but Shindou also has a past that she can't tell anyone about.
4	4	"Kahvel of Cortonel"; Transliteration: "Korutoneru no Kahaberu" (Japanese: コルトネルのカハベル)	Kyōhei Ōyabu	Takao Yoshioka	Kyōhei Ōyabu	October 23, 2020
The party heads toward Radodorbo, a village far to the west, to complete the latest stage of their quest. However, Shindou is captured by bandits on the way. Tokitate and Hakozaki want to save her, but Yotsuya just wants to hurry on, so the three of them end up parting ways. Yotsuya then enters a martial arts tournament in Cortonel in hopes of winning some horses they can use, and there, he meets a woman knight named Kahvel.
5	5	"What a Life Is Worth"; Transliteration: "Inochi no Kachi wa" (Japanese: 命の価値は)	Kyōhei Ōyabu	Takao Yoshioka	Tetsurō Amino	October 30, 2020
Yotsuya has succeeded in saving the other party members with Kahvel's help. Kahvel agrees to accompany them to Radodorbo if they'll allow her to train them in swordsmanship, since they are the players and therefore can't die. They encounter a village of goblins on the way and engage them in battle. Hakozaki, who only slowed everyone down in battle before due to her lack of strength and resignation, finally finds her resolve and manages to slay a goblin on her own.
6	6	"The Ancient Ruins of Hosszú Bányázait Alagút"; Transliteration: "Kodai Iseki Hozzu Banyazatto Araguttsu" (Japanese: 古代遺跡ホッズ・バニャザット・アラグッツ)	Naoyoshi Kusaka	Takao Yoshioka	M.F.K	November 6, 2020
Yotsuya's party has saved the people who were under attack by kobolds. They then find out the group is a squad of soldiers from the dictatorial Kingdom of Deokk, and they're escorting heretics to Radodorbo to be executed. The party still isn't sure how they should interpret their quest, so for the time being, they accompany the soldiers and heretics on the way to Radodorbo, They reach a mountain and Kamilto explains it will take them seven days to cross it, but there is a shortcut. They decide to use it and enter the mountain which has a big mechanism. While waiting to activate it, Kamilto betrays them and closes the door behind them, leaving them no choice but to continue the newly opened path. On the way, they see large swinging hammers on the pathway and Yotsuya sees some pillars. Checking the symbols, he figures it out and rotates the pillars causing the hammers to stop, allowing them to cross safely. Next ahead there is path with a wall on the side, however Yotsuya gets careless and the wall pushes him down a hole. He informs the rest to continue, while he tries to find a way out by his own. Hakozaki manages to figure out how the wall pushing mechanism works and their timings and they manage to cross.
7	7	"The Warrior of Light and the Stranger of Darkness"; Transliteration: "Hikari no Senshi to Yami no Tanin" (Japanese: 光の戦士と闇の他人)	Tomihiko Ōkubo	Takao Yoshioka	Tomihiko Ōkubo	November 13, 2020
Yotsuya carve holes into the walls and starts climbing. He falls dozen of times and while climbing recalls his time when he transferred into a new school and how lonely he was. Eventually he manages to climb up. Continuing on the path, he sees a log point and checking it, he sees the group saying their farewells to the now deceased warrior Bihmsberg. He finds Bihmsberg's body and recalls some moments he had with him like pushing the cart and eating together. He says his farewells and continues on the path. Meanwhile, the group fights off some vampire bats and face the gargoyle. Things look desperate when the gargoyle takes down Kahvel, but then Shindou reaches rank 10 and job-changes to a Warrior (Sword), allowing her to put up a fight against the gargoyle. Yotsuya finally reaches the group and sees they have defeated a gargoyle.
8	8	"Non-Player Killer"; Transliteration: "Non Pureiyā Kirā" (Japanese: ノン プレイヤーキラー)	Hiromichi Matano	Takao Yoshioka	Kyōhei Ōyabu	November 20, 2020
After escaping the cave, the party splits into two teams, with one pursuing the Deokk soldiers and the other searching for ways to complete their quest. The team of Yotsuya, Tokitate, and Kahvel catches up to Kamilto and his men, but if they jump straight into battle, it could cause a war to break out between Deokk and Kahvel's homeland of Cortonel.
9	9	"Heart-Racing Logout"; Transliteration: "Tokimeki Roguauto" (Japanese: ときめきログアウト)	Takeyuki Yanase	Sawako Hirabayashi	Takeyuki Yanase	November 27, 2020
Yotsuya's plan to rescue the heretics is successful, as is his vengeance on Kamilto for killing Kahvel's subordinate. He and Tokitate head to Radodorbo with the heretics while Shindou and Hakozaki travel separately in hopes of finding cargo bound for Radodorbo. Along the way, Tokitate becomes invested in what she perceives as a budding relationship between Yotsuya and Kahvel and tries to initiate events to bring them together.
10	10	"Yotsuya Yuusuke Dies"; Transliteration: "Yotsuya Yūsuke Shisu" (Japanese: 四谷友助死す)	Toshiaki Kanbara	Takayo Ikami	M.F.K	December 4, 2020
After successfully delivering their cargo to Radodorbo, Yotsuya and the others part ways with Kahvel and split up to cover ground in four different directions so they can complete their quest to cover 5% of the map. It shouldn't be a difficult task if all went as expected, but a sudden blizzard impedes their progress.
11	11	"Majiha Forever"; Transliteration: "Majiha yo Towa ni" (Japanese: マジハよ永遠に)	Naoyoshi Kusaka	Takayo Ikami	M.F.K	December 11, 2020
The progress of all four party members is halted by heavy snow as time continues to tick away. What's worse, if anyone freezes to death, they can't come back to life until the weather they revive in becomes survivable again. The party grows desperate. Yotsuya gets lost in an underground dungeon that he unexpectedly fell into, Shindou walks across a frozen lake without realizing how thin the ice beneath her feet is, and Hakozaki is unable to progress any further. As the party members lose their lives one by one, Tokitate, the last one alive, is ready to give up. When she suddenly gets help from a mysterious female magician, and wins.
12	12	"A Murderer's Summer"; Transliteration: "Satsujin-han no Natsu" (Japanese: 殺人犯の夏)	Naoyoshi Kusaka	Takao Yoshioka	Kumiko Habara	December 18, 2020
As her reward for completing the quest, Tokitate gets to ask the Game Master whether this alternate world is actually virtual or not... and the answer is that it's an alternate Earth that branched off of the original Earth's timeline. Upon hearing that it's an existing world, Yotsuya trembles with the realization that he killed real people. Once he returns to the real world and resumes his normal life, the Game Master appears before him in the form of a young girl and leads him to a meeting with the next new player. The Game Master asks poignent questions on value of life and tries to show through Yasuke's quest experiences life's value however, Yasuke knows he has wrong values but rather be deluded that all humans are worthless except those who can provide personal benefits or better than himself. Rather try to be a psychopath than follow social norms.

===== Season 2 =====
No. overall	No. in season	Title	Directed by	Written by	Storyboarded by	Original release date
13	1	"I Know, Let's Go to Jiffon"; Transliteration: "Sō da Jifon, Ikō." (Japanese: そうだ ジフォン、行こう。)	Kumiko Habara	Sawako Hirabayashi	Kumiko Habara	July 10, 2021
Torii Keita, who Yotsuya saved, is the fifth player; they embark on their fifth quest.
14	2	"Yana & Aoiu Are the Väikedaam"; Transliteration: "Yāna & Aoyū Futari wa Vaikudamu" (Japanese: ヤーナ&アォユーふたりはヴァイクダム)	Naoyoshi Kusaka	Takayo Ikami	M.F.K	July 17, 2021
The current quest is to make Jiffon Island's harvest festival a success; the festival can't be held because some orcs that strayed onto the island have taken over all of the Buffo that are traditionally offered as sacrifices.
15	3	"We Can't Be Heroes of Justice"; Transliteration: "Seigi no Mikata ni wa Narenai" (Japanese: 正義の味方にはなれない)	Kyōhei Ōyabu	Sawako Hirabayashi	Kyōhei Ōyabu	July 24, 2021
After becoming a Blacksmith, Yotsuya develops two new tactical weapons to use against the orcs. The battle enters its final stages.
16	4	"The Island That Flows"; Transliteration: "Nagareru Shima" (Japanese: 流れる島)	Naoyoshi Kusaka	Takayo Ikami	M.F.K	July 31, 2021
The islanders send the women and children away on a boat, but the orcs find and target them. Shindou and Cantil move to stop them, but in the midst of the fight, the earth begins to shake violently as the volcano on the island erupts.
17	5	"Dik Throbb"; Transliteration: "Tsinko Binbin" (Japanese: ツィンコ ビンビン)	Masakazu Takahashi	Sawako Hirabayashi	Kunihisa Sugishima	August 7, 2021
The Orc Queen, barely surviving the battle, tries to escape a ravaged Jiffon Island with the orc children to a new land. But she finds herself facing Shindou and the other human fighters first.
18	6	"All They Can Do Is Look Up at It"; Transliteration: "Karera wa Tada Sore o Miageru" (Japanese: 彼らはただそれを見上げる)	Hiromichi Matano	Takayo Ikami	Tetsurō Amino	August 14, 2021
The threat of the orcs has passed, but a dragon hanging out in the caldera brings a new threat to the island. It appears to be sucking the life force out of the islanders to store up energy, but it would be suicidal to try to attack it head-on.
19	7	"A Short Film and the Sixth Hero"; Transliteration: "Tanpen Eiga to Roku-banme no Yūsha" (Japanese: 短編映画と六番目の勇者)	Naoyoshi Kusaka	Takao Yoshioka	M.F.K	August 21, 2021
After completing the fifth quest, Yotsuya is back in his hometown when a woman named Glenda pays him a visit, who hopes to get in touch with parallel world explorers.
20	8	"The Journey of Death"; Transliteration: "Shide no Tabi" (Japanese: 死出の旅)	Takeyuki Yanase	Takao Yoshioka	Takeyuki Yanase	August 28, 2021
Yotsuya's party is travelling in order to complete the sixth quest. They meet Jezby, a girl being attacked by monsters. They save her and take her back to her village.
21	9	"The Monsters Attack"; Transliteration: "Majū Sōshingeki" (Japanese: 魔獣総進撃)	Kyōhei Ōyabu	Takao Yoshioka	Tetsurō Amino	September 4, 2021
Cox, who had achieved peace in the village by closing it off and reducing the number of mouths to feed, attempts to get rid of the heroes. But then a monster's voice resounds throughout the village.
22	10	"A Will to Destroy"; Transliteration: "Metsubō e no Ishi" (Japanese: 滅亡への意志)	Naoyoshi Kusaka	Takao Yoshioka	M.F.K	September 11, 2021
Yotsuya's party manages to escape the village and accompanies the villagers in their hurried search for a new permanent residence, even as monsters close in on them.
23	11	"Dragon Bishop"; Transliteration: "Doragon Bishoppu" (Japanese: ドラゴンビショップ)	Ryūta Yamamoto	Takao Yoshioka	Kunihisa Sugishima	September 18, 2021
After joining up with the villagers who left on the Journey of Hope, the group is attacked by monsters. But a surprising figure from their past shows up and saves them.
24	12	"On a Million Lives"; Transliteration: "Hyakuman no Inochi no Ue ni" (Japanese: 100万の命の上に)	Kumiko Habara; Hiromichi Matano	Takao Yoshioka	Kumiko Habara; Tetsurō Amino	September 25, 2021
The battle between the Dragon Bishop and the party of heroes begins.

=== Novel ===
A novel adaptation written by Sawako Kobayashi and illustrated by Nao was published by Kodansha on July 9, 2021.

== See also ==
- My Home Hero, another manga series written by Naoki Yamakawa
- Trinity Seven, another manga series illustrated by Akinari Nao
