= Konohana Kitan =

Japanese manga series

- Cover of the first Konohana-tei Kitan manga volume featuring the protagonists Yuzu (front) and Satsuki (back).

このはな綺譚
- Genre: Mythic fiction, Slice of life, Yuri
- Manga

Konohana-tei Kitan
- Written by: Sakuya Amano
- Published by: Ichijinsha
- Magazine: Comic Yuri Hime S
- Original run: June 18, 2009 – June 18, 2010
- Volumes: 2
- Manga
- Written by: Sakuya Amano
- Published by: Gentosha
- English publisher: NA: Tokyopop
- Magazine: Monthly Birz
- Original run: December 29, 2014 – present
- Volumes: 17
- Anime television series
- Directed by: Hideki Okamoto
- Written by: Takao Yoshioka
- Music by: Hajime Kikuchi
- Studio: Lerche
- Licensed by: Crunchyroll
- Original network: AT-X, Tokyo MX, Kansai TV, BS11
- Original run: October 4, 2017 – December 20, 2017
- Episodes: 12
- icon

Konohana Kitan (このはな綺譚) is a Japanese manga series by Sakuya Amano. Originally published in Ichijinsha's yuri manga magazine Comic Yuri Hime S under the name Konohana-tei Kitan (此花亭奇譚) between 2009 and 2010 before going on hiatus, the series relaunched in Gentosha's seinen manga magazine Comic Birz in December 2014. The manga is licensed in English by Tokyopop. A 12-episode anime television series adaptation by Lerche aired in Japan between October and December 2017.

== Plot ==
A young foxgirl named Yuzu who was raised by a human gets a job at a hot springs inn called Konohanatei that is run by foxgirls. As Yuzu slowly learns the ropes, they deal with various supernatural phenomena and guests.

== Characters ==
Yuzu (柚)
Voiced by: Yuko Ōno (Japanese); Lindsay Seidel (English)
An innocent and loving foxgirl who has grown up with a nun, and just arrived at Konohanatei to expand her horizons. She has great respect for everyone around her, but takes a particular liking to Satsuki. A healing character, she brightens up the visitors' days.
Satsuki (皐)
Voiced by: Sawako Hata (Japanese); Dawn M. Bennett (English)
A serious-minded foxgirl and a bit of a workaholic. Deep down, she is quite sensitive, hoping to become a miko someday. Nevertheless, this only makes her work harder at Konohanatei to make up for her feelings of incompetence. She is quite fond of Yuzu, but not very good at showing it.
Natsume (棗)
Voiced by: Ayaka Suwa (Japanese); Emily Fajardo (English)
A tomboyish foxgirl that would easily pass as male. She has an exuberant and playful personality, but can be quite dedicated and courageous at times. She is quite protective of Ren, but gets along with everyone else.
Ren (蓮)
Voiced by: Risa Kubota (Japanese); Kate Oxley (English)
A feminine and perfectionistic foxgirl who seeks solace in being beautiful and performing well in her work. She is afraid of men due to childhood traumas of being bullied by them, but seems to see Natsume as her 'boyfriend' figure.
Sakura (櫻)
Voiced by: Ai Kakuma (Japanese); Jad Saxton (English)
A tiny foxgirl who is mysterious and idiosyncratic. Her thoughts are seldom known and she always seems to be doing weird, genius-like things. She spends some time with Yuzu since they're both the smallest, but secretly seems to trust Kiri the most.
Kiri (桐)
Voiced by: Manami Numakura (Japanese); Morgan Garrett (English)
A relaxed, older foxgirl who is the head of all the others. She appears to be laid-back but has an emotionally-intelligent side, seeming to have much experience in dealing with others and is secretly fond of Sakura and acts as her caretaker.
Okiku (お菊)
Voiced by: Akeno Watanabe (Japanese); Sarah Wiedenheft (English)
A "cursed" porcelain doll who ends up joining the Konohanatei after she is brought in for purification. She is often pestered by Sakura, who wants to cut her hair. She also mentions many times that her real name is not Okiku, but she has also never revealed her actual name.
Okami (女将; lit. 'Landlady')
Voiced by: Megumi Ogata (Japanese); Linda Leonard (English)
The owner of Konohanatei who has the appearance of a fox but can look human by applying makeup. Her real name is Tsubaki (椿).

== Media ==
=== Manga ===
Sakuya Amano's original manga was first serialized in Ichijinsha's Comic Yuri Hime S yuri magazine in 2009 under the name Konohana-tei Kitan, before going on hiatus in 2010. Ichijinsha compiled the series into two tankōbon volumes released between January and August 2010, with new editions published by Gentosha between May and June 2015. In December 2014, the series relaunched as Konohana Kitan in Gentosha's Comic Birz magazine. Seventeen tankōbon volumes have been released as of September 2025. Tokyopop began publishing the series in North America from July 24, 2018.

==== Volume list ====
Konohana-tei Kitan

| No. | Japanese release date | Japanese ISBN |
|---|---|---|
| 01 | January 18, 2010 | 978-4-7580-7071-3 |
| 02 | August 18, 2010 | 978-4-7580-7106-2 |
| New(1) | May 23, 2015 | 978-4-344-83435-4 |
| New(2) | June 24, 2015 | 978-4-344-83457-6 |

Konohana Kitan

| No. | Original release date | Original ISBN | English release date | English ISBN |
|---|---|---|---|---|
| 01 | April 24, 2015 | 978-4-344-83416-3 | July 24, 2018 | 978-1-4278-5946-4 |
| 02 | October 24, 2015 | 978-4-344-83542-9 | October 23, 2018 | 978-1-4278-5950-1 |
| 03 | March 24, 2016 | 978-4-344-83669-3 | February 12, 2019 | 978-1-4278-5954-9 |
| 04 | October 24, 2016 | 978-4-344-83821-5 | April 9, 2019 | 978-1-4278-5978-5 |
| 05 | March 24, 2017 | 978-4-344-83943-4 | July 16, 2019 | 978-1-4278-6024-8 |
| 06 | September 23, 2017 | 978-4-344-84054-6 | October 22, 2019 | 978-1-4278-6026-2 |
| 07 | June 23, 2018 | 978-4-344-84179-6 | January 21, 2020 | 978-1-4278-6214-3 |
| 08 | January 24, 2019 | 978-4-344-84371-4 | June 30, 2020 | 978-1-4278-6325-6 |
| 09 | August 24, 2019 | 978-4-344-84474-2 | December 22, 2020 | 978-1-4278-6326-3 |
| 10 | March 24, 2020 | 978-4-344-84622-7 | October 12, 2021 | 978-1-4278-6880-0 |
| 11 | September 24, 2020 | 978-4-344-84707-1 | October 4, 2022 | 978-1-4278-6924-1 |
| 12 | March 24, 2021 | 978-4-344-84822-1 | March 28, 2023 | 978-1-4278-7258-6 |
| 13 | December 24, 2021 | 978-4-344-84956-3 | May 28, 2024 | 978-1-4278-7408-5 |
| 14 | September 24, 2022 | 978-4-344-85109-2 | September 24, 2024 | 978-1-427-87809-0 |
| 15 | July 24, 2023 | 978-4-344-85199-3 | September 29, 2026 | 978-1-427-88716-0 |
| 16 | August 23, 2024 | 978-4-344-85387-4 | November 17, 2026 | 978-1-427-88851-8 |
| 17 | September 24, 2025 | 978-4-344-85609-7 | — | — |
| 18 | December 23, 2026 | 978-4-344-85781-0 | — | — |

=== Anime ===
A 12-episode anime television series adaptation, directed by Hideki Okamoto at Lerche with Takao Yoshioka handled the series composition and Keiko Kurosawa designed the characters, aired in Japan between October 4 and December 20, 2017. The opening theme song is "Kokoro ni Tsubomi" (ココロニツボミ, Bud in the Heart) by Eufonius, and the ending theme is ""Haru Urara, Kimi to Sakihokoru" (春ウララ、君ト咲キ誇ル) by Ai Kakuma, Ayaka Suwa, Manami Numakura, Risa Kubota, Sawako Hata, and Yūko Ōno. Crunchyroll simulcast the series while Funimation streamed a simuldub.

==== Episode list ====
| No. | Title | Original release date |
|---|---|---|
| 1 | "Sakuya Konohana"; Transliteration: "Sakuya Konohana" (Japanese: さくやこのはな) | October 4, 2017 |
A young foxgirl named Yuzu is brought by her guardian Bikuni to work at a hotel called the Konohanatei. Under the supervision of head attendant Kiri, Yuzu begins her training while getting to know her fellow employees; Satsuki, Natsume, and Ren. While cleaning the floors, Yuzu ends up overpolishing them, causing one of the guests to slip. While Satsuki, feeling that attendants should share the responsibility, tries to apologise, both Yuzu and the guest find a way for her to loosen up. Later, Yuzu begins working alongside another attendant, Sakura, who wanders off into the forest, leading Yuzu to a field of cherry blossoms.
| 2 | "Spring Journey"; Transliteration: "Haru no Tabiji" (Japanese: 春の旅路) | October 11, 2017 |
Forced to take a day off work, Satsuki invites Yuzu into town with her. While preparing to go out, Yuzu learns from Ren that Satsuki is planning to leave the Konohanatei to become a priestess. Although generally enjoying her date, Satsuki becomes irritated when Yuzu brings up what Ren told her. While Satsuki goes to the washroom, Yuzu comes across a mysterious woman who is looking for her younger sister, who Satsuki ends up encountering. Just then, the younger sister captures Satsuki in an attempt to make a dead cherry blossom bloom, but the older sister arrives and makes the tree bloom instead. As Yuzu and Satsuki reunite, they observe a performance by Satsuki's older sister, Hiiragi, who had become a priestess in Satsuki's place, while the two mysterious sisters disappear somewhere.
| 3 | "Waiting Lovesick"; Transliteration: "Koi Machikogare" (Japanese: 恋待ち焦がれ) | October 18, 2017 |
Ren recalls how she first met Natsume, feeling she was a lot more beautiful and refined than the girl she currently knows. During a party, Ren panics after lashing out against a perverted guest, but Natsume stands up for her, reminding Ren of what attracted her to Natsume. Later, a guest named Aoi takes a liking to Natsume, prompting some jealousy from Ren. After speaking with Yuzu, who encourages her to be honest with her feelings, she discovers that Aoi had simply approached Natsume out of wanting to learn more about sumo wrestling, after which she becomes honest with Natsume about feeling lonely.
| 4 | "Raft Bridge of Dreams"; Transliteration: "Yume no Ukikyō" (Japanese: 夢の浮き橋) | October 25, 2017 |
Ren wakes up to find a strange egg attached to her body, later having a bad dream about Natsume that suddenly turns into a good dream. The egg then attaches itself to Satsuki, who in turn has a dream about her internal worries about her family that changes into a pleasant one involving Yuzu. The next day, the egg hatches into a pig-like creature which they call Urinosuke, who is hinted to be the one behind the nightmares disappearing. Later, the girls come across a girl named Shino who seems to rapidly grow from baby to child to teenager. She is eventually discovered by Yuzu to be a doll brought to life by one of the guests mourning over her deceased daughter. After being thanked by Shino for a wonderful dream, the guest eventually departs to join her in the afterlife.
| 5 | "The Spring Rains Bring With It"; Transliteration: "Baiu Okurishi" (Japanese: 梅雨(ばいう)送りし) | November 1, 2017 |
One of the guests brings in a living doll named Okiku who is bewildered by the behavior of the staff. Having had bad experiences of not being played with, Okiku is treated kindly by the others and has her bad dreams cleansed by Urinosuke. Brought on as a maid, Okiku accompanies Yuzu to a shed where a girl is so focused on her weaving that she has barely eaten her meals. While checking up on her, Yuzu comes to admire the girl's skills of weaving fabric from the rain and manages to provide her with some company. Befriending Yuzu and taking her advice on eating and sleeping properly, the girl finishes what she was weaving; a rainbow.
| 6 | "Konohanatei Horror Stories"; Transliteration: "Konohanatei Kaidan" (Japanese: 此花亭怪談) | November 8, 2017 |
While telling ghost stories, the lights suddenly go out in the Konohanatei, leading Yuzu to discover that Satsuki is afraid of the dark. Satsuki eventually encounters a ghost who has been impersonating the others and causing trouble. As the ghost, who died being unable to make friends, impersonates Satsuki and attempts to take Yuzu with her, Yuzu tells her about how she learned from Bikuni to be more confident in herself and was eventually encouraged to join the Konohanatei. Content with Yuzu's words, the ghost heads off on a boat on her own, with Yuzu only realizing afterwards that she was trying to take her across the Sanzu River.
| 7 | "Night of the Summer Festival"; Transliteration: "Natsu Matsuri no Yoru" (Japanese: 夏祭りの夜) | November 15, 2017 |
Yuzu, Satsuki, and Sakura head down to a summer festival being held in town. While taking part in the Bon Odori, Yuzu inadvertently ends up joining a line of spirits returning to the afterlife. Luckily, she is saved by the ghost she met before, who helps her to return safely to the others. Afterwards, Ren goes to the festival with Natsume, becoming annoyed when she doesn't pay attention to how she looks. However, Natsume manages to recognise the pain Ren is going through and help her enjoy the fireworks.
| 8 | "The Transient Guest"; Transliteration: "Karisome no Hōkyaku" (Japanese: かりそめの訪客) | November 22, 2017 |
Yuzu discovers a human girl named Rei Matsumoto who feels isolated from others due to her habit of lying. Sensing some sincerity behind her lies, Yuzu reminds Matsumoto that some lies can be fun, after which she wakes up in her own world and makes an earnest friend. Later, a boy named Kaito runs away to the Konohanatei after discovering he is being sent away from his adoptive parents to a facility. Speaking with a man who refuses to return home due to an accident he wound up in, both Kaito and the man decide to return home following a discussion with Kiri. A short time later, Kaito, who has now grown up, returns to the Konohanatei to report his new family, as it is revealed that he is actually a dog, now working as a guide dog for the blind man he met at Konohanatei.
| 9 | "Evanescent..."; Transliteration: "Utakata no..." (Japanese: 泡沫の...) | November 29, 2017 |
After being saved from some mischievous kids, an elderly turtle invites Yuzu to go to Ryugu Castle, but she declines, stating that she has more fun staying at the Konohanatei. Afterwards, Ren is tasked with attending to the goddess Awanami, but becomes bewildered when she suddenly splits into hundreds of tiny bubbles. As the others try to catch them, Yuzu gets caught by one of the bubbles and sees a vision of the creation of the world before she is saved by Satsuki and Kiri, who explains that Awamami is undergoing rebirth and helps her to reassemble.
| 10 | "The Sister Strikes"; Transliteration: "Aneue Shūrai" (Japanese: 姉上襲来) | December 6, 2017 |
Satsuki inadvertently drinks a medicine that causes her to shrink down to a tiny size. Having to spend the day riding on Yuzu's shoulder, Satsuki is amazed by how good Yuzu has gotten at her job. After Satsuki returns to normal size, she and Yuzu attend to Hiiragi and her fellow priestess Ayame when they come to stay at the Konohanatei. As Satsuki deals with her sister's erratic behavior, Yuzu becomes worried over when Satsuki will inevitably leave the Konohanatei to be a priestess. At the behest of one of the guests, Satsuki is asked to perform a kagura dance alongside Hiiragi, leading her to feel frustrated when comparing herself to her. After Hiiragi takes her leave the next day, it is revealed she feels that Satsuki was chosen over her to work at the Konohanatei.
| 11 | "A God's Day Off"; Transliteration: "Kami-sama no Kyūjitsu" (Japanese: 神様の休日) | December 13, 2017 |
An old man, who is a former god of battle, spends time entertaining Sakura with toys made from acorns while lamenting there is no need for him in a time of peace. Meanwhile, Yuzu hears about how the Konohanatei was like years ago from a woman, who turns out to be the fox landlady, Okami, in her human form. Later, Okiku comes across a discarded doll named Lily and brings her back to the Konohanatei, but finds the others are too busy to help fix her. Lily, who recognises that Okiku has remained pretty because she hadn't been played with, eventually disappears from the Konohanatei, after which she is found by her original owner.
| 12 | "Miracle of New Year's Eve"; Transliteration: "Ōmisoka no Kiseki" (Japanese: 大晦日の奇跡) | December 20, 2017 |
Yuzu finds a kenzoku scroll while cleaning Okami's room before going with everyone to the shrine to celebrate the new year. After briefly dropping it, Yuzu finds herself in another dimension where a girl named Tsubaki mistakes her for one of her co-workers and drags her to a shrine where kenzoku work to help grant the wishes of those who pray at the shrine. Learning that she might not be able to return to her one world, Yuzu decides to help out after one of the workers collapses, learning of all the malicious and kind-hearted wishes that people make. Hearing Yuzu's desire to return home to her friends, Tsubaki manages to open the scroll Yuzu brought with her, giving her the ability to send Yuzu home safely. Afterwards, it is revealed that Tsubaki was actually Okami herself from many years ago, with Yuzu's actions leading to the creation of the Konohanatei.
