= List of By the Grace of the Gods episodes =

By the Grace of the Gods is an anime television series based on the light novel series of the same name written by Roy and illustrated by Ririnra. It was announced by Hobby Japan on February 20, 2020, which was later confirmed to be a television series on April 17, 2020. The series was animated by Maho Film and directed by Takeyuki Yanase, with Kazuyuki Fudeyasu as story editor and screenwriter, Kaho Deguchi as character designer with Ririnra credited with the original designs, and Hiroaki Tsutsumi composing the music. While the first episode had an advanced premiere screening at FunimationCon 2020 on July 3, 2020, the series officially ran for 12 episodes in Japan from October 4 to December 20, 2020, on Tokyo MX and BS Fuji. Azusa Tadokoro performed the opening theme "Yasashii Sekai", while MindaRyn performed the ending theme "Blue Rose knows".

The series was licensed outside of Asia by Funimation. On October 31, 2020, Funimation announced that the series would receive an English dub, which premiered the following day. Following Sony's acquisition of Crunchyroll, the series was moved to Crunchyroll. Medialink has also licensed the series in South and Southeast Asia and streamed it on their Ani-One YouTube channel.

On June 4, 2021, a second season was announced. Yuka Yamada replaced Kazuyuki Fudeyasu as the scriptwriter. It aired from January 9 to March 27, 2023. (Note: Tokyo MX listed the season premiere at 24:00 on January 8, 2023, which is at midnight on January 9.) MindaRyn performed the opening theme "Way to go", while Azusa Tadokoro performed the ending theme "Drum-shiki Tansaki".

== Series overview ==
| Season | Episodes | Originally released | |
| Season | Episodes | First released | Last released |
|---|---|---|---|
| 1 | 12 | October 4, 2020 | December 20, 2020 |
| 2 | 12 | January 9, 2023 | March 27, 2023 |

== Episodes ==
=== Season 1 ===
| Story | Episode | Title (Note: All English titles are taken from Funimation.) | Directed by | Written by | Original release date |
|---|---|---|---|---|---|
| 1 | 1 | "Ryoma, with the Slimes"; Transliteration: "Suraimu-tachi to Ryōma" (Japanese: スライムたちとリョウマ) | Takeyuki Yanase | Kazuyuki Fudeyasu | October 4, 2020 (Note: It had an advanced premiere screening on July 3, 2020.) |
Ryoma Takebayashi is an 11-year-old boy who lives in the forest with over 1000 magical slime familiars. He finds Reinhart Jamil, a noble, and his soldiers in the forest and invites them to his home. Seeing he obviously lives alone, they become suspicious. Ryoma claims he learned magic from his deceased grandparents. Camil, a mage, determines Ryoma has a high resistance to mental and physical pain. After they leave, Ryoma feels guilty about lying. In truth, three years prior, he was an unhappy Japanese salaryman who unexpectedly died in his sleep. In the afterlife, he met three gods, Gain, Lulutia, and Kufo, who explained their alternate Earth is running out of magic, and if they reincarnate him in their world, it will form a bridge to Ryoma's Earth, which has an abundance of magic. They give Ryoma magical abilities and allow him to keep his brute strength and resistance to mental and physical pain. Arriving in the alternate Earth as an 8-year-old boy, Ryoma met his first slime and spent three years learning about them until meeting Reinhart. Two weeks later, Ryoma is surprised when Reinhart returns with even more people, including his daughter Eliaria.
| 2 | 2 | "Departure, with the Slimes"; Transliteration: "Suraimu-tachi to Tabidachi" (Japanese: スライムたちと旅立ち) | Kyōhei Ōkazu | Kazuyuki Fudeyasu | October 11, 2020 |
Reinhart introduces Ryoma to his father Reinbach, his wife Elise and daughter Eliarlia who are amazed by his monster-taming abilities. After presenting Ryoma with a gold clock for previously helping him, Reinbach reveals the Jamil family have been tamers for generations and requests Ryoma help Eliarlia tame a slime as her very first familiar. After sharing some of his slime knowledge, Eliarlia decides to tame a cleaner slime that can cleanse away impurities, filth and grime, even though it means using bath water tainted with her sweat as bait, the only definite way of attracting a cleaner slime. The Jamil family invite Ryoma to accompany them on their trip to another town, Gimul, and Ryoma accepts as he only knows the forest and is eager to explore his new world. Using item storage magic, Ryoma brings his extensive collection of possessions with him, including many valuable items he created experimenting with his slimes abilities, leading Reinbach to suspect Ryoma might have a bright future as a craftsman or even a merchant. On the journey, a rockslide blocks the path, but Ryoma solves the problem using several spells he created himself, impressing Reinhart's mages before continuing on to Gimul.
| 3 | 3 | "First Time in Town, with the Slimes"; Transliteration: "Suraimu-tachi to Hajimete no Machi" (Japanese: スライムたちと初めての街) | Hiromichi Matano | Kazuyuki Fudeyasu | October 18, 2020 |
Ryoma is taken to Gimul's church to obtain his status board, which also functions as personal identification. Ryoma meets the three gods again. Gain, who created the slimes, congratulates Ryoma for creating the cleaner and scavenger slimes by unintentionally influencing their evolution. Lulutia reveals two Jamil ancestors were from Ryoma's earth, an animal lover who created Taming Magic and a shy otaku who became a powerful warrior magician. They also inform Ryoma he has gained the attention of the Gods of War and Magic and the God of Artisans has given Ryoma his blessing. Returning to Gimul, Ryoma is advised to register at a guild so unscrupulous people are less likely to take advantage of him. Eliaria is amazed Ryoma can control his vast magic capacity so well, revealing she actually has more magic than him but with less control. At the Tamers Guild, Ryoma learns raising his rank will be difficult due to how unimpressive slimes are. Instead, he joins the Adventurers Guild where Guild Master Worgan accepts him immediately after witnessing Ryoma's warrior abilities. At the lowest rank of G, Ryoma takes his first G ranked job, to clean the home of Miya, a cat beastkin.
| 4 | 4 | "Clean-Up Duty, with the Slimes"; Transliteration: "Suraimu-tachi to Seisō Sagyō" (Japanese: スライムたちと清掃作業) | Kyōhei Ōkazu | Kazuyuki Fudeyasu | October 25, 2020 |
With help from his slimes, Ryoma not only cleans Miya's house, but make some repairs on it, much to her joy, and she increases his reward out of gratitude. In his next job, Ryoma is tasked to clean the communal toilets, amid suspicions the toilets are not being properly maintained due to embezzlement perpetrated by the local authorities. While Reinhart investigates the matter, Ryoma discovers the toilets are contaminated with miasma. Upon knowing of this, the Jamil family attempts to dissuade Ryoma from continuing the task, but he convinces them he is the most suited for it. The guild then sends Miya along with some other adventurers to keep the population away from the toilets until Ryoma completes the cleaning. After the job is done, Ryoma reminisces about his mother, who used to stay awake to welcome him home after work until her death, and cries tears of joy when the Jamil family welcomes him home in a similar fashion.
| 5 | 5 | "The Lady's Training Session, with the Slimes"; Transliteration: "Suraimu-tachi to Ojōsama no Kunren" (Japanese: スライムたちとお嬢様の訓練) | Tomihiko Ōkubo | Kazuyuki Fudeyasu | November 1, 2020 |
Following Ryoma's advice playing with magic is a good way to learn, Eliaria asks him to teach her how to play. Ryoma also asks Camil to teach him attack magic. Sebas, the Jamils' butler, also teaches Ryoma advanced teleportation and storage magic. The next day, the Jamil family and their soldiers visit a mine overrun by monsters so Eliaria can learn. After encountering cave mantises, Eliaria uses her magic to kill them, while Ryoma uses his new warrior skills. Eliaria discovers and catches a rare metal slime and gives it to Ryoma as a gift. Ryoma realizes the mine can be reopened by using magic to extract the tiny traces of iron left in the soil, delighting Duke Jamil. Reinbach introduces Ryoma to Serge Morgan, a trader, who is delighted to buy and sell Ryoma's creations, making Ryoma very wealthy, though Ryoma insists on remaining anonymous, fearing the attention he would receive if anyone nefarious discovered he can use real alchemy. Reinhart finishes his investigation and has the embezzlers arrested. Having received a request from Duke Jamil, Reinhart decides to send Ryoma and other adventurers to clear the monsters from the mines.
| 6 | 6 | "Monster Hunting, with the Slimes"; Transliteration: "Suraimu-tachi to Majū Tōbatsu" (Japanese: スライムたちと魔獣討伐) | Takeyuki Yanase | Kazuyuki Fudeyasu | November 8, 2020 |
The Adventurer Guild begins their operation to clear the monsters from the mines. The mission goes smoothly until they discover a large nest of goblins deep inside. The adventurers then launch a coordinated attack against the goblins and despite the enemies being in a larger number than expected, they are defeated without casualties, with Ryoma and his slimes having an important role. Once he returns home, Ryoma decides he cannot indulge further on the Jamil family's hospitality and expresses his desire to live independently from them.
| 7 | 7 | "Starting the Business, with the Slimes"; Transliteration: "Suraimu-tachi to Sentakuya no Kaiten Junbi" (Japanese: スライムたちと洗濯屋の開店準備) | Naoyoshi Kusaka | Kazuyuki Fudeyasu | November 15, 2020 |
Having predicted Ryoma's intention to follow his own path, Reinhart and his family agree with his request, but make him promise to keep in touch and visit them regularly. The next day, Ryoma seeks advice and support from the Merchant Guild to help with his plans to start a laundry shop. After securing a plot of land, Ryoma spends the next day building the facility with help from his friends. After the main building is complete, Ryoma pays a visit to the church to meet the gods, but only Kufo is there to welcome him, while Lulutia and Gain are having some recreation on Earth. Kufo warns Ryoma his mental/emotional maturity will regress back to a child's to synchronize with his new body, but his memory and beliefs will stay the same.
| 8 | 8 | "Laundry Business, with the Slimes"; Transliteration: "Suraimu-tachi to Sentakuya Kagyō" (Japanese: スライムたちと洗濯屋稼業) | Kyōhei Ōkazu | Kazuyuki Fudeyasu | November 22, 2020 |
The Merchant Guild sends siblings Callum and Carla Norad to work under Ryoma in his laundry shop. After giving them instructions on their new job, Ryoma has both help him with an opening party he gives to all his friends. The next day, Ryoma decides to do some work at the Adventurer Guild as he believes few customers will show up for the shop's opening. However, he is shocked when sees the shop is crowded when he returns. At the end of day, Ryoma decides to hire more assistants and returns home satisfied after a successful day of work.
| 9 | 9 | "The New Coworkers, with the Slimes"; Transliteration: "Suraimu-tachi to Atarashii Dōryō" (Japanese: スライムたちと新しい同僚) | Naoyoshi Kusaka | Kazuyuki Fudeyasu | November 29, 2020 |
Ryoma interviews some candidates to work on his shop, but all of them refuse to work under a child or deal with slimes, except for foreigners Fei and his daughter Li Ling. Ryoma notices they are carrying concealed weapons, and both confirmed they are former assassins. Despite this, Ryoma decides to hire both not only to attend the customers, but to also work as security guards. After another successful day of work, Ryoma uses the healing slimes to cure Fei's broken leg, much to his joy. With his business' increasing success, Ryoma hires four other female workers, including a cook, and he hears suggestions to open other branches of the laundry shop. Watching how Ryoma is doing fine, the Jamil family rejoices, certain he can fend for himself without their support.
| 10 | 10 | "The New Slimes, with the Slimes"; Transliteration: "Suraimu-tachi to Shinshu no Suraimu" (Japanese: スライムたちと新種のスライム) | Toshiaki Kanbara | Kazuyuki Fudeyasu | December 6, 2020 |
The Merchant Guild requests from Ryoma a large order of waterproof cloth for the seasonal Quell Frog hunt and he decides to produce them inside the mines and Eliaria accompanies him to practice with her violin. One of his slimes evolve into an iron slime after eating some iron. Eliaria later asks Ryoma makes a small statue of hers. Satisfied with the result, he ends making up statues of all members of the Jamil estate, and they decide to have her take them as a memento for when she leaves for studying, including one of Ryoma. Later at the shop, Ryoma learns the sales and profits keep increasing as Bamboo Forest's reputation grows and he realizes he forgotten to give holiday breaks to his employees, who rejoice when he decides to do so. It is normally a rarity, but Ryoma does not wish to cause exploitation. Afterwards, he learns from the Adventurer's Guild a group of adventurers captured a new kind of slime. As such, he buys it from them. By appraising the slime, he learns it is a bloody slime. Watching his progress, the three gods rejoice on their decision of picking Ryoma. Later at home, Eliaria invites Ryoma for a taming magic training session with her family.
| 11 | 11 | "Taming Magic Training, with the Slimes"; Transliteration: "Suraimu-tachi to Jū-majutsu no Renshū" (Japanese: スライムたちと従魔術の練習) | Tomihiko Ōkubo | Kazuyuki Fudeyasu | December 13, 2020 |
The Jamil family holds a training session with Ryoma and Eliaria who learn new abilities from them. Afterwards, Ryoma completes the waterproof cloth order and joins Eliaria and the others to watch the limur birds' annual migration. During the occasion, one tamer attempts to use his music to tame a limur bird, but is attacked by them instead. Ryoma and the others attempt to rescue him when one of the birds attack everyone with some powerful magic. Ryoma drives the birds away thanks to his resistance to mental pain. Eliaria becomes a little disappointed she did not manage to tame a limur bird as she intended, but she and the others decide to return in the next day for another attempt.
| 12 | 12 | "The Beginning of a New Era, with the Slimes"; Transliteration: "Suraimu-tachi to Aratanaru Hibi" (Japanese: スライムたちと新たなる日々) | Takeyuki Yanase | Kazuyuki Fudeyasu | December 20, 2020 |
When the limur birds return, both Eliaria and Ryoma use music to tame a few of them, with Ryoma also taming the Nightmare Limur Bird they previously encountered and Eliaria taming a Phantom Limur Bird. During dinner, the Jamil estate celebrate Ryoma and Eliaria's success as well as their last night together before they part ways. The next day, Eliaria and her family bid farewell to Ryoma, who promises to keep in touch with them and to visit Eliaria in three years during her break from her studies and sets to the mines to build a new home. The gods, watching over Ryoma, renew their conviction they made the right choice of reincarnating him in their world and look forward to his next adventures.
| Special | Special | "Clean-Up Duty, with the Slimes Audio Commentary Version"; Transliteration: "'Suraimu-tachi to Seisō Sagyō' Ōdiokomentarī Ban" (Japanese: 「スライムたちと清掃作業」オーディオコメンタリー版) | N/A | N/A | December 27, 2020 |
A special broadcast of Episode 4 featuring audio commentary provided by Azusa Tadokoro (Ryoma), Yūki Kuwahara (Eliaria), and Marika Kōno (Miya).

=== Season 2 ===
| Story | Episode | Title (Note: All English titles are taken from Crunchyroll.) | Directed by (Note: Information is taken from the ending credits of each episode.) | Written by | Original release date |
|---|---|---|---|---|---|
| 13 | 1 | "Ryoma and the New Plan"; Transliteration: "Ryōma to Atarashī Keikaku" (Japanese: リョウマと新しい計画) | Yūji Yanase | Yuka Yamada | January 9, 2023 |
Ryoma gets used to life in the city of Gimul after parting ways with the Jamil family. Two customers attempt to cause trouble at his laundry shop, but they fail and are arrested, leading Ryoma to create a sturdy polymer using the sticky slimes to reinforce the windows and keep intruders out. In the occasion, he also discovers one of his poison slimes evolved into a medicinal slime, capable to create antidotes and antibiotics after the slime drank some antidote he dropped by accident. During another visit to the gods' realm, Ryoma meets Tekkun, God of Wine and Craftsmanship who commends him for his works. Ryoma orders a huge sum of bottles for the new medicines he created with the Merchant Guild, who agrees to buy all his production. Despite many of his friends' suggestion he should open a second shop, Ryoma has doubts about it, until he receives a letter from Eliaria, which encourages him to do so.
| 14 | 2 | "Ryoma and the Crime Prevention Drill"; Transliteration: "Ryōma to Bōhan Kunren" (Japanese: リョウマと防犯訓練) | Hideki Hiroshima | Kunihiko Okada | January 16, 2023 |
After stopping another thug from causing trouble at his shop, Ryoma learns the attacks are related to a dispute among the Taming Guild, with one of the factions intending to discredit the Guildmaster, who changed his views toward slime taming thanks to him. To ease the rumors, Ryoma relays to the public the fact he also tamed limur birds, but a group of criminals in response attack him in an attempt to steal them. Ryoma defeats them and to discourage more attacks, starts charging expensive fees for using the slimes to heal the criminals he injures while defending himself, while performing self-defense training with his employees. After also training the workers to take care of the shop in his absence, Ryoma departs to another city in order to look for a suitable place to open his second shop.
| 15 | 3 | "Ryoma and the Poster Girl"; Transliteration: "Ryōma to Kanbanmusume" (Japanese: リョウマと看板娘) | Naoyoshi Kusaka | Kōji Mayo | January 23, 2023 |
Ryoma arrives at the city of Lenaf and meets the merchant Pioro Saionji, who had made most of the necessary arrangements for Ryoma to open his shop by the Guildmaster's request, and his daughter Miyabi. While having dinner with them, Ryoma reveals his plans to work as an adventurer until he finishes the preparations to open the shop. However, he learns there are few jobs for E Rank adventurers like him because of a group of smash boars, which are powerful monsters who appeared nearby, and remembers this is one of the species the gods recommended him to hunt down to improve his combat experience. While gathering herbs to attend a request, Ryoma receives another letter from Eliaria, but his reading is interrupted when he spots a pair of adventurers running in fear from a smash boar.
| 16 | 4 | "Ryoma and the Second Shop"; Transliteration: "Ryōma to 2 Gōten" (Japanese: リョウマと2号店) | Kyohei Oyabu | Kunihiko Okada | January 30, 2023 |
Ryoma defeats the smash boar and rescues the adventurers and heals a companion of theirs who was seriously injured while protecting them. To repay the favor, Ryoma convinces the adventurers to help him carry the boar's body to town and explain to the Guild he was forced to violate the rules of fighting such a powerful monster without authorization in self-defense. After selling the boar's meat to Pioro and earning the rewards from killing it, Ryoma finishes the preparations for the inauguration of the second shop, and after training the employees properly, decides to return to Gimul. Before departing, Ryoma remembers Miyabi will soon join the Imperial Academy like Eliaria and suggests Miyabi to try to become friends with her. Back in Gimul, Ryoma meets Serge, who introduces him to some magic tools that pique his interest.
| 17 | 5 | "Ryoma and the New Acquaintance"; Transliteration: "Ryōma to Aratana Deai" (Japanese: リョウマと新たな出会い) | Kiyotaka Kantake | Kōji Mayo | February 6, 2023 |
Back at the shop, Ryoma learns one of his cleaning slimes started eating charcoal and realizes it is about to evolve into another type. With his shops in good hands, Ryoma decides to focus on increasing his adventurer rank and accepts a delivery job in the city of Keleban, which will soon open a fair of magical artifacts. While completing the delivery, Ryoma meets Serge again and is given a prototype magic tool which he uses as a base to create a music box. Ryoma is surprised when Serge reveals there is no such item in the market and is certain nobles will buy it. As such, they begin making plans to mass produce it.
| 18 | 6 | "Ryoma and the Magic Item Market"; Transliteration: "Ryōma to Mahō Dōgushi" (Japanese: リョウマと魔法道具市) | Tomihiko Ōkubo | Kunihiko Okada | February 13, 2023 |
Ryoma and Serge close a deal with the magic artisan Dinome to mass produce the music boxes. Back to Gimul, Ryoma witnesses the slime who ate charcoal evolve into a deodorizing slime and uses its fluid to create some deodorizer pouches he gives to his friends and employees to test its effectiveness. He also meets some children from the slums and helps fix their carriage. The children ask for Ryoma's help to clean the church and while helping them with the task, he has a short meeting with the god Fernobelia, who asks some questions to evaluate his behavior, claiming some reincarnated people tend to misuse their powers and it is the gods' duty to prevent it. Satisfied with Ryoma's answers, he sends him back. After the cleanup, Ryoma and Worgan have some training exercise with the children and Worgan invites him to become a combat instructor at the guild. Ryoma considers the proposal, as despite being very busy lately, he wants to do his best to help the villagers and repay their kindness.
| 19 | 7 | "Ryoma and the Local Cuisine"; Transliteration: "Ryōma to Kyōdo Ryōri" (Japanese: リョウマと郷土料理) | Toshiaki Kanbara | Shunma Hara | February 20, 2023 |
Ryoma learns from Eliaria she is about to move to the Imperial Capital to begin her studies and decides to make some soap as gifts for her. Back at the shop, he learns the cleaning slimes in the Lenaf shop have begun multiplying out of control. After dealing with the situation, Ryoma meets Pioro, who introduces him to the shapaya, a traditional food known for having a pungent smell and helps him get rid of the odor with his deodorizing slime, receiving a barrel full of them in return. He also learns Miyabi just departed to the capital to study as well. Back to Gimul, Ryoma learns from Serge the music box production is going smoothly and they intend to launch their product during the upcoming festival to celebrate the city's foundation. At the shop, Ryoma develops a new dish using the shapaya and some spices he received as gift from some relatives of his employees, and they decide to mount their own stall in the festival.
| 20 | 8 | "Ryoma and the Traveling Entertainer"; Transliteration: "Ryōma to Tabigeinin" (Japanese: リョウマと旅芸人) | Naoyoshi Kusaka | Kōji Mayo | February 27, 2023 |
While testing the recipes for the stall, Ryoma is introduced to Prenance, leader of the Semroid troupe of entertainers. Prenance, whose troupe will stay at some of the laundry's unoccupied rooms for the festival, thanks him for his hospitality, and mentions the travel to Gimul was hard due to the appearance of some monsters called "tunnel ants". The next day, Ryoma accepts a quest to look for the tunnel ants' nests and meets the children from the slums again, who were tasked to kill the ants, whose carapaces they intend to use as materials for some protective gear for their use. After Ryoma finds the nests, he helps the children to kill the ants and invites them to work in his stall during the festival. Meanwhile, Eliaria departs from the Jamil Estate to the capital in order to begin her studies at the Imperial Academy.
| 21 | 9 | "Eliaria and the New Friends"; Transliteration: "Eriaria to Atarashī Nakama-tachi" (Japanese: エリアリアと新しい仲間たち) | Yūji Yanase | Yuka Yamada | March 6, 2023 |
One month after beginning her studies at the Imperial Academy, Eliaria still has not made any friends at all due to her social status being much higher than her peers for being a duke's daughter, until she meets Michelle Wildan, a count's daughter who studies magic circles and Miyabi, who approaches her by Ryoma's suggestion. The three become friends and invite two other students for their study group: Riela Clifford, a baron's daughter who is also an aspiring knight and Kanan Schuzer, a craftsman's daughter. During a field activity, Eliaria's group make use of their individual talents to help other students with difficulties on their tasks and resolve conflicts between them. After the activity, Eliaria renews her hopes that she will have a happy life in school thanks to her new friends and sends Ryoma a letter about it.
| 22 | 10 | "Ryoma and the Flying Slime"; Transliteration: "Ryōma to Soratobu Suraimu" (Japanese: リョウマと空飛ぶスライム) | Naoyoshi Kusaka | Kunihiko Okada | March 13, 2023 |
Worgan invites Ryoma to participate in a special quest with his fellow adventures, which involves hunting down a huge quantity of treants, one of the monsters in Ryoma's list. During the mission, Ryoma spots a fluffy slime and tames it. The party eventually discovers that the treants' numbers are much higher than they expected because there is an ancient treant among them, which is turning all the forest trees into more treants. With help from his companions, Ryoma slays the ancient treant and the party realizes that the enemy was in possession of a large quantity of mana crystals, which explains why it became much stronger than usual. Having accomplished their quest, Ryoma turns his attention to the upcoming festival, his heart filled with anticipation.
| 23 | 11 | "Ryoma and the Busy Days"; Transliteration: "Ryōma to Awatadashī Hibi" (Japanese: リョウマと慌ただしい日々) | Shigeki Awai | Kōji Mayo | March 20, 2023 |
Back from the forest, Ryoma and the others put the final touches on their preparations for the festival and Ryoma takes a day off by his employees' suggestion. While playing with his slimes, Ryoma watches Pioro arrive at the city and greets him. Pioro delivers some supplies to Asagi, who reveals that he decided to have his own stall at the festival by Miya's request because she wants the other citizens to try the tempura he makes. However, when Asagi becomes worried that such a dish will not be suitable for the festival, Ryoma gives him the idea of making some tenmusu instead. Meanwhile, Tekkun, Kufo and Fernobelia are satisfied about how Ryoma got used to life in their world, while being a positive influence to others.
| 24 | 12 | "Ryoma and the Town of Gimul"; Transliteration: "Ryōma to Gimuru no Machi" (Japanese: リョウマとギムルの街) | Kyohei Oyabu | Yuka Yamada | March 27, 2023 |
The festival begins and the music boxes designed by Ryoma are a success. Bamboo Forest's stall also runs smoothly to the point of the staff becoming shorthanded. Having predicted this, Carla and some employees from the Lenaf shop arrive to help. Ryoma takes a break to enjoy the festivities and while helping a lost young boy reunite with his mother, realizes how he has adjusted to life in Gimul. During the closing party, Ryoma performs with the Semroid troupe. To celebrate the occasion, Ryoma has two special music boxes prepared, keeping one of them and sending the other to Eliaria, who cannot wait to see Ryoma again.
