= The World's Strongest Rearguard =

Japanese light novel series

- The World's Strongest Rearguard: Labyrinth Country's Novice Seeker
- First light novel volume cover featuring (from top to bottom) Arihito, Elitia, Igarashi, and Theresia

世界最強の後衛 ～迷宮国の新人探索者～ (Sekai Saikyō no Kōei: Meikyūkoku no Shinjin Tansakusha)
- Genre: Fantasy, isekai
- Novel series
- Written by: Toowa
- Published by: Shōsetsuka ni Narō
- Original run: April 27, 2017 – present
- Light novel
- Written by: Toowa
- Illustrated by: Huuka Kazabana
- Published by: Fujimi Shobo
- English publisher: NA: Yen Press
- Imprint: Kadokawa Books
- Original run: November 10, 2017 – present
- Volumes: 9
- Manga
- Written by: Toowa
- Illustrated by: Rikizo
- Published by: Media Factory
- English publisher: NA: Yen Press
- Imprint: MF Comics
- Magazine: ComicWalker (Note: ComicWalker changed its name to KadoComi (カドコミ) in December 2023.)
- Original run: March 30, 2018 – present
- Volumes: 11
- Anime television series
- Directed by: Yūji Yanase
- Written by: Deko Akao
- Music by: Hinako Tsubakiyama; Fuwari
- Studio: Maho Film
- Licensed by: Crunchyroll: SA/SEA: Muse Communication
- Original network: Tokyo MX, SUN, BS11
- Original run: July 5, 2026 – September 20, 2026
- Episodes: 12
- icon

The World's Strongest Rearguard: Labyrinth Country's Novice Seeker (Japanese: 世界最強の後衛 ～迷宮国の新人探索者～, Hepburn: Sekai Saikyō no Kōei: Meikyūkoku no Shinjin Tansakusha) is a Japanese light novel series written by Toowa and illustrated by Huuka Kazabana. It was originally posted as a web novel on the online publication platform Shōsetsuka ni Narō in April 2017, before being published by Fujimi Shobo as a light novel under their Kadokawa Books imprint in November of the same year. A manga adaptation illustrated by Rikizo began serialization Kadokawa Corporation's ComicWalker service in March 2018. An anime television series adaptation produced by Maho Film aired from July to September 2026.

== Plot ==
The series follows Arihito Atobe, a salaryman who is killed in a bus accident. After being reincarnated into another world, he is asked to pick a job class. He picks being a rearguard, which turns out to be a powerful class that no one before him had been. Armed with his new powers, he help his party members explore labyrinths, as their bonds grow over time.

== Characters ==
Arihito (アリヒト)
Voiced by: Yoshitsugu Matsuoka
Arihito was a company businessman until he died from a bus accident along with his boss Kyouka Igarashi. After reincarnating into the Labyrinth Country, Arihito accidentally gained a powerful Rearguard Class which granted him unique skills. Arihito eventually created a party with Theresia who he bonded with, along with Kyouka, Elitia, Suzuna, Misaki, and later Madoka and Melissa.
Theresia (テレジア, Terejia)
Voiced by: Aoi Koga
Theresia is a young lizard Demi-Human girl who was originally a human until she died in one of the labyrinths and was reincarnated as a Demi-Human. She was Arihito's first companion and eventually grew closer together, Theresia does not hesitate to protect Arihito and cares deeply about him. It is hinted that Theresia has gained feelings for Arihito and gets embarrassed when she recalls their intimate moments.
Kyōka (キョウカ)
Voiced by: Sakura Nakamura
Kyouka in her previous life was Arihito's boss at the company that they both worked at. After being reincarnated into the Labyrinth Country, Kyouka had chosen to be a "Valkyrie" and joined another party. But after she was abandoned by them, she joined Arihito's party after he saved her life. Kyouka is hinted to have feelings for Arihito and attempts to flirt with him but fails due to being interrupted by the other girls.
Elitia (エリーティア, Erītia)
Voiced by: Yui Ishikawa
Elitia is a veteran Labyrinth Seeker who was the given the nickname "Death Sword" as she wields a cursed sword that can cause her to go berserk if she gets blood on any part of her body. She first formed a party with Suzuna, but eventually joined Arihito's party after he helped rescue her, Suzuna, and Misaki. In the past, Elitia was part of the "White Knight Brigade", a group who is known for using and possessing cursed weapons. But Elitia eventually quit the group after they abandoned her companion in a labyrinth and decided to find new companions who could help rescue her captive friend.
Suzuna (スズナ)
Voiced by: Saori Hayami
Suzuna was a passenger on the same bus that Arihito was on and reincarnated into the Labyrinth Country as well. She chose the job "Shrine Maiden" and agreed to join Elitia's party, however after Arihito helped save her and Misaki, they all joined Arihito's party. Suzuna's skills help heal the party from ailments and she is shown to be proficient at Archery.
Misaki (ミサキ)
Voiced by: Kaede Hondo
Misaki was a passenger on the same bus that Arihito was on and reincarnated into the Labyrinth Country as well. Misaki chose the job "Gambler" as she believes in luck and eventually accompanied Suzuna and Elitia into a Labyrinth. But she was taken hostage by some despicable seekers and was eventually rescued by Arihito and joined his party. Misaki is extremely mischievous and makes a lot of mistakes that inadvertently helps the group discover new areas and treasures.
Madoka (マドカ)
Voiced by: Kanon Takao
Madoka was a merchant in the labyrinth country until most of her valuables were destroyed during a Monster Outbreak. However, Arihito allowed her to join his party as he realized just how useful her skills were.
Melissa (メリッサ, Merissa)
Voiced by: Yūka Aisaka
Melissa worked as a Monster Dissector with her father, she was seen every now and again when Arihito killed new monsters. In the past, her mother had died during a labyrinth expedition with her father. After her mother was reincarnated into a Demi-Human, it was revealed that she was pregnant and eventually gave birth to Melissa. As a result, Melissa has abilities of a Demi-Human despite having a human appearance. She eventually joined Arihito's party to hopefully help cure her mother and turn her back into a human.

== Media ==
=== Light novel ===
Written by Toowa, The World's Strongest Rearguard: Labyrinth Country's Novice Seeker was originally posted as a web novel on the online platform Shōsetsuka ni Narō on April 27, 2017. The series was later published by Fujimi Shobo and released as a light novel under their Kadokawa Books imprint, with the first volume released on November 10, 2017. Nine volumes have been released as of September 2025. The series is licensed in English by Yen Press.

No.	Original release date	Original ISBN	North American release date	North American ISBN
1	November 10, 2017	978-4-04-072503-1	October 29, 2019	978-1-9753-3154-2
2	April 10, 2018	978-4-04-072505-5	February 25, 2020	978-1-9753-3156-6
3	August 10, 2018	978-4-04-072850-6	June 23, 2020	978-1-9753-3158-0
4	February 9, 2019	978-4-04-072849-0	November 17, 2020	978-1-9753-1571-9
5	July 10, 2019	978-4-04-073240-4	March 23, 2021	978-1-9753-1573-3
6	January 10, 2020	978-4-04-073241-1	March 22, 2022	978-1-9753-3333-1
7	March 10, 2021	978-4-04-073676-1	August 16, 2022	978-1-9753-4393-4
8	November 10, 2021	978-4-04-074221-2	June 20, 2023	978-1-9753-5055-0
9	September 10, 2025	978-4-04-075919-7	December 8, 2026	979-8-8554-3797-3

=== Manga ===
A manga adaptation illustrated by Rikizo began serialization on Kadokawa Corporation's ComicWalker service on March 30, 2018. The first tankōbon volume was released on September 22, 2018; eleven volumes have been released as of November 2026. The manga adaptation is also licensed in English by Yen Press.

No.	Original release date	Original ISBN	North American release date	North American ISBN
1	September 22, 2018	978-4-04-069984-4	January 28, 2020	978-1-9753-0581-9
2	July 22, 2019	978-4-04-065807-0	August 25, 2020	978-1-9753-1562-7
3	March 21, 2020	978-4-04-064503-2	January 19, 2021	978-1-9753-2012-6
4	November 21, 2020	978-4-04-064897-2	January 25, 2022	978-1-9753-3743-8
5	December 23, 2021	978-4-04-680255-2	February 21, 2023	978-1-9753-5178-6
6	August 20, 2022	978-4-04-681605-4	June 20, 2023	978-1-9753-6855-5
7	September 21, 2023	978-4-04-683017-3	December 10, 2024	979-8-8554-0184-4
8	March 22, 2024	978-4-04-683499-7	July 22, 2025	979-8-8554-1290-1
9	February 21, 2025	978-4-04-683996-1	May 26, 2026	979-8-8554-2828-5
10	January 23, 2026	978-4-04-685020-1	—	—
11	November 20, 2026	978-4-04-660629-7	—	—

=== Anime ===
An anime television series adaptation was announced on September 8, 2025. It is produced by Maho Film and directed by Yūji Yanase, with Deko Akao handling series composition, Eiko Yanagimoto designing the characters, and Hinako Tsubakiyama and Fuwari composing the music. The series aired from July 5 to September 20, 2026, on Tokyo MX and other networks. The opening theme song is "License", performed by Redhair Rosy, while the ending theme song is "Owaranai Yoru no Mamori-kata" (終わらない夜の守り方; How to Protect the Endless Night), performed by Inner Journey. Crunchyroll is streaming the series. Muse Communication licensed the series in South and Southeast Asia.

==== Episodes ====
No.	Title	Directed by (Note: Production staff information is taken from the ending credits of each episode.)	Written by	Storyboard by	Original release date
1	"A Novice Seeker in Labyrinth Country"; Transliteration: "Meikyūkoku no Shinjin Tansakusha" (Japanese: 迷宮国の新人探索者)	Yūji Yanase	Deko Akao	Yūji Yanase	July 5, 2026
After a fatal coach crash alongside his coworkers, Arihito is reincarnated in another world's Labyrinth Country. At the Seekers Guild, he witnesses coworker Suzuna become a Shrine Maiden and join veteran Elitia's party as Rearguard, despite rumours Elitia's partners never last long. Hoping for a stress-free life away from his former boss Igarashi, Arihito is dismayed when she appears with the job "Valkyrie" looking for recruits. After she leaves, Arihito applies for a job, writing "Rearguard" on his form. Shockingly, the text transforms into an unreadable, ancient language. Guild receptionist, Louisa, explains "Rearguard" is a general category, not a specific job. Unable to identify what his job title actually is now, she gifts him Mercenary Tickets as an apology. Arihito uses these to hire the slave Theresia, a Lizardwoman Rogue, from the Mercenary Guild. He guiltily learns demi-humans like Theresia are cursed former humans enslaved until their masters break the transformation curse, unable to communicate beyond obeying orders. A Retrieval Expert employed to rescue injured Seekers, warns Arihito to flee from "Named" monsters. Inside, Arihito underestimates a Level 1 Fluffball, injuring Theresia. After working out his defensive Rearguard skills, they defeat it. Arihito apologizes to the silent Theresia before discovering Igarashi's party trapped by a Named Fluffball; Redface.
2	"The First Hurdle"; Transliteration: "Saisho no Nankan" (Japanese: 最初の難関)	Naoyoshi Kusaka	Deko Akao	Takeshi Mori	July 12, 2026
Igarashi's companions abandon Igarashi, proving she was never in their party. Arihito tries to protect her, but his skills only work on party members, resulting in Igarashi being injured. Blaming himself for not forming a party with her earlier, Arihito buffs Theresia's attack power, defeating Redface. He adds Igarashi to his party to heal her, and Ribault the Retrieval Expert takes her to hospital. Mercenary guild master Leila reveals Theresia has grown attached to Arihito, so he could buy her permanently for 100 Mercenary Tickets. Louisa informs him Redface had a 20-gold bounty, and slaying it earned Arihito 280 Contribution Points and an unprecedented 50 Trust Points from Theresia. Louisa suspects Arihito's unidentified job makes him the world's strongest Rearguard. His contribution points also earn him a hotel suite. Igarashi agrees to remain in his party if he uses her name instead of "Chief", admitting she prefers reincarnation over her old life, where her parents controlled her. After hearing rumours Elitia was in the White Knight Brigade, the party re-enters the dungeon to earn Theresia's tickets. Hearing screams on floor two, they rush in despite warnings of a Named Juggernaut. They find Elitia fighting a Fanged Orc while Suzuna is frozen in fear. After helping defeat it, Elitia reveals she wants to make Suzuna stronger, which Arihito deduces is tied to returning to the White Knights.
3	"The Little Tyrant Girl"; Transliteration: "Bōkun no Shōjo" (Japanese: 暴君の少女)	Akizumi Kaneko & Fumio Maezono	Deko Akao	Takeshi Mori	July 19, 2026
Elitia has no plan to rejoin the White Knights, focusing instead on rescuing Suzuna's friend, Misaki. Suzuna explains Misaki, a believer in luck, chose the Gambler job title, only to be teleported away by a trap chest. After Arihito explains his Rearguard abilities, Suzuna joins his party, while Elitia stays solo to maximize EXP efficiency. They find Misaki tied up as bait for the Named Juggernaut. Arihito realizes a deceptive Seeker group led by Bergen plans to let them weaken the Juggernaut, then swoop in to steal the rewards. Elitia slaughters the orcs but enters an uncontrollable rage. Arihito discovers she is a Berserker triggered by enemy blood. Out of options, Elitia joins his party so he can buff and shield her. They defeat the Juggernaut and capture Bergen's group. The Juggernaut drops a rare black treasure chest, which Elitia warns should only be opened by a guild Chest Cracker. Later, Arihito invites everyone to dinner, including Theresia, who expresses a desire to stay with them. Louisa promises the guild will punish Bergen. She is stunned to learn Arihito's exploits have earned him 1,649 Contribution Points, making him the district's second highest-ranked Seeker. Arihito invites Louisa to join them for dinner, revealing his next goal: buying Theresia and breaking her curse.
4	"A Life-or-Death Mixed Bath"; Transliteration: "Kikyūsonbō no Kon'yoku" (Japanese: 危急存亡の混浴)	Kyōhei Ōyabu	Kunihiko Okada	Yūji Yanase & Mei Aratani	July 26, 2026
Louisa explains demi-human curses might be broken at District 4's cathedral, though reaching it from District 8 is tough as even Elitia barely made it to District 5. Igarashi, Misaki, and Elitia agree to go. Elitia hopes the journey helps break the curse of her sword, Scarlet Emperor, which cannot be unequipped and changed her job from Swordfighter to Berserker. Suzuna agrees to go to stay with Elitia. Arihito pays Leila to add Theresia to his party. To bypass hotel room limits, Elitia suggests Arihito use his upgraded status to eventually secure a Royal Suite for their party to share. Later at the baths, Theresia secretly follows a shocked Arihito into the men's section naked. He locks the door, but panics when she faints, as Lizard-people are cold-blooded and overheat easily. Fortunately, the girls do not suspect him of perversion, so after reviving Theresia, they draw lots for available bed space. Arihito gets the sofa but during the night, all six girls realize their feelings for him and surround him, leaving before he wakes up feeling strangely unsettled. The next day, Louisa arranges their Royal Suite and a Chest Cracker appointment, while Arihito visits a Dissector to process the Juggernaut into usable materials.
5	"The Black Treasure Chest and the Young Wife's Secret"; Transliteration: "Kurobako to Waka Okusama no Himitsu" (Japanese: 黒箱と若奥様の秘密)	Hideki Hiroshima	Maika Shizuhara	Naotaka Hayashi	August 2, 2026
Arihito visits the Arthur Chest Cracker Company to meet Falma, who owns a giant Silver Hound named Cion. Falma warns that their Black Chest holds high-value treasure, but opening it improperly will spawn an army of Juggernauts or detonate half the city. After she successfully opens it, a fortune in gold, weapons, and gear pours out. Once appraised, Arihito equips a support-boosting vest, slingshot, and gloves. Theresia equips Chameleon Boots to hide in plain sight, while Igarashi equips magic-defending armour, though she dislikes how lewdly revealing it is. Returning to the dungeon, the party tests their new equipment and skill point upgrades. Suzuna notices everyone glowing, a phenomenon invisible to others, leading Arihito to suspect she has an extrasensory perception ability. When a monster freezes Igarashi, Arihito steps in to assist. He discovers the glow stems from his Moral Support skill, which enables party members to execute title-unique skills even at low levels. Soon after, Suzuna's Moon Reading skill reveals an unexplored bonus area. Misaki's bad luck causes her to tumble into it, prompting the rest of the team to rush in after her.
6	"The Mechanical Ariadne"; Transliteration: "Kikai Shikake no Ariadone" (Japanese: 機械仕掛けのアリアドネ)	Yūko Ōba	Toshima Hara	Takaaki Ishiyama	August 9, 2026
Suzuna's Spirit Detection skill reveals that previous seekers died fighting in the bonus area. Suspicious of a nearby statue, Arihito correctly identifies it as a Named monster, the Giant Eagle Headed Warrior. Knowing the head is its weakness, Arihito shields the team while prioritizing defence, though he suffers an unhealable stomach wound. He directs Igarashi and Theresia to activate Morale Discharge, creating clones of the party to double their damage output. Arihito teleports behind the Warrior and shoots its head, enabling Elitia and Misaki to shatter it. Theresia then heals Arihito's wound using her attack-based healing skill. The defeated Warrior drops an equipment-enhancing black rune and its jewel eye that unlocks a stone door. Inside, they find a coffin holding a sleeping young woman with a keyhole in her chest. Arihito uses a key found in the black chest by Falma to awaken her. She introduces herself as Ariadne the Iron Wheel, the 117th Hidden God, and recognizes Arihito as the Unfaltering Rearguard from Another World. Missing crucial parts, she warns she cannot leave her prison and if they assist a Hidden God it will make them enemies of all other Gods. Despite the risks, the party pledges to find her missing parts. Grateful, Ariadne registers them as her Devotees and teleports them to the surface.
7	"The Hope of Demi-humans"; Transliteration: "Ajin no Kibō" (Japanese: 亜人の希望)	Nobutaka Chikahashi	Deko Akao	Yūji Yanase	August 16, 2026
By discovering the bonus area, Arihito earns enough Contribution Points to propel his party to #1 in District 8. Soon after, he intervenes when a thug extorts Falma's children, briefly adding Cion to his party to instantly boost her attack and send the extortionist flying. Theresia warms up to Cion after seeing her comfort around demi-humans, and Falma recommends bringing Cion on their next quest to level up. Meanwhile, Rikerton the Dissector shares that his wife was also cursed into a demi-human in a labyrinth while pregnant. She continued adventuring to find a cure for herself, leaving him to raise their daughter, Melissa. Worried about Melissa's obsession with dissecting monsters, Rikerton supports her joining Arihito's next quest. Arihito also meets Georg, leader of the now #2 party Polaris, who humbly accepts the demotion and offers a friendly drink. Adjusting his party tactics to include Cion and Melissa, Arihito prepares for the journey. That evening, the party enjoys their new Royal Suite's private bath in pairs, with Igarashi surprisingly allowing Theresia to bathe with Arihito, provided they wear swimsuits. However, the next morning a Monster Stampede erupts inside the city.
8	"A City in Turmoil"; Transliteration: "Kyōhon Sōzen no Machi" (Japanese: 狂奔騒然の街)	Naoyoshi Kusaka & Hideya Yoshida	Kunihiko Okada	Takeshi Mori	August 23, 2026
They begin clearing monsters, but a singing Demi-harpy lulls everyone to sleep except Theresia and Arihito. Cion and Falma arrive; Arihito teleports behind the Demi-harpy to drag her from the sky. Falma permanently transfers Cion's ownership to Arihito and suggests sending the defeated Demi-harpy to Monster Ranch for training, allowing Arihito to later summon her as a familiar. Falma also gifts anti-sleep crystals and an anti-confusion bracelet. Joined by Ribault and Leila, the group fights the Named monster Death From Above. As Ribault faces death, Arihito calls upon Ariadne to restrain the monster so the girls can destroy it, earning a confusion stone. Leila notices Arihito's summoning abilities but refrains from prying. Afterward, Arihito invites Madoka, a trader whose merchandise was destroyed, to join the party as their Merchant. Saving District 8 earns Arihito enough Contribution Points for promotion to District 7, though he insists on taking the official exam first, a carefree stance Elitia disputes. Grateful for being saved in battle, Igarashi offers to serve as Arihito's maid for the evening.
9	"Hidden Wounds and a Warrior's Confession"; Transliteration: "Hime Rareta Kizu to Senshi no Kokuhaku" (Japanese: 秘められた傷と戦士の告白)	Yoshihisa Matsumoto & Karata Honoe	Maika Shizuhara	Takeshi Mori	August 30, 2026
While celebrating, the group plays the King Game. Prompts to confess her romantic feelings lead Elitia to reveal her heart belongs to a friend left behind in another dungeon. During her time with the White Knight Brigade, a Shining Simian Monkey captured her friend. Because the monster turns victims into servants rather than killing them, Elitia believes her friend is still alive. The party vows to help, though they need to pass the promotion exam first. Arihito upgrades his and Theresia's weapons at the Mistral Magic Forge with Ceres the Runemaster, and her armoured golem Steiner the blacksmith. Ceres embeds runes and magic stones into Arihito's slingshot—creating the Named "Black Magical Slingshot" with poison, stun, and confusion effects—and adds stun to Theresia's sword. Ceres is touched to see a human befriending a demi-human. Later, Arihito visits Monster Ranch owner William and his daughter Milith. He wins the trust of the frightened harpies, who agree to register as his summonable familiars. That night, Arihito hears rumors that a Named monster in the Shrieking Woods is sabotaging Seekers taking promotion exams, including Georg's party, Polaris.
10	"The Beautiful Girl in the Maddening Forest"; Transliteration: "Kurueru Mori no Bijo" (Japanese: 狂える森の美女)	Naoyoshi Kusaka	Toshima Hara	Naotaka Hayashi	September 6, 2026
When Georg's party is late returning from their exam, Arihito enters the Shrieking Wood labyrinth to search for them. Meanwhile, Madoka visits Rikerton to pick up the processed materials for Arihito. There, Melissa reveals she is crafting an invisibility suit using a camouflage stone. Bonding over their shared experience as young businesswomen, Madoka and Melissa become friends, delighting Rikerton. Melissa shares that her mother is a cat demi-human, explaining the cat-like behaviours Melissa inherited during her mother's pregnancy. In the dungeon, Theresia is poisoned by a mushroom monster, causing Confusion that makes her attack her allies; she feels deeply guilty once she recovers. Later, a defeated Treant drops an apple that permanently increases maximum magic levels. The group agrees Arihito should eat it, and Theresia insists on hand-feeding it to him. Tracking Georg's scent, Cion finds him and they learn his teammates Sophie, Mihail, Jake, and Tyler were captured by a Grass monster. Arihito teleports Georg to the surface for help. They find Sophie seemingly unharmed, but soon realize she and the others are controlled by the underground-dwelling Named monster, Vine Puppeteer. Unable to attack it directly, Arihito summons the Harpies.
11	"The Allure of Returning to the Start Point"; Transliteration: "Genten Kaiki no Yūwaku" (Japanese: 原点回帰の誘惑)	Yutaka Terasaki	Kunihiko Okada	Tomohiko Ōkubo	September 13, 2026
The harpies put the party to sleep except Sophie, the one most infected by vines. Arihito teleports behind her and shoots the flower on her spine to free her. When it emerges from the ground, Elitia slices Vine-Puppeteer into pieces, yielding another black chest. They name the harpies Asuka, Yayoi, and Himiko before Guild Savior Seraphina teleports everyone home. Louisa awards them massive contribution points and passes them for the Promotion Exam. Arihito donates his cash reward to Polaris' medical expenses. Jealous of Seraphina shaking Arihito's hand, Theresia clings to him. At the hospital, Sophie remains unconscious, and Arihito collapses from exhaustion. He experiences jumbled memories of an alternate life as a Hero who refuses to protect ordinary people. Realizing this is an illusion, Arihito discovers Vine-Puppeteer is infiltrating his mind. Theresia uses her slave crest to enter his psyche and destroy the monster. Arihito wakes in the hospital and finds a vine connecting his body to Sophie's, as Vine-Puppeteer was still hiding inside her. Now fully dead it drops a seed, which Arihito sends to Monster Ranch. Sophie recovers, and Ariadne psychically warns the group the new chest contains her armour, which will violently defend itself if they open it carelessly.
12	"To the Future of Labyrinth Country"; Transliteration: "Sono-saki no Meikyū Kuni e" (Japanese: その先の迷宮国へ)	Yūji Tanase & Kyōhei Ōyabu	Deko Akao	Yūji Yanase	September 13, 2026
Arihito decides to move to District 7, with Louisa choosing to transfer to the local guild to remain their administrator. Seraphina gifts Arihito a ticket to the Islet of Illusion, a resort-style island dungeon, prompting a group beach vacation. While exploring, Kyouka wants to adopt a Coral Peigos Penguin, but learns she must first defeat a Named penguin and loot a specific item. Nearby, Arihito spots Theresia underwater and attempts to follow, but dives too deep and nearly drowns. He awakens on the surface to a shy Theresia, who later admits with embarrassment that she saved him using mouth-to-mouth resuscitation. The party eventually dives deeper, discovering a teleportation circle that leads to a new island. Elitia realizes the dungeon spans multiple ocean islands. There, a giant Named penguin appears: Jewelled-Wings-Dancing-Over-Frozen-Wastelands. Recognizing the intimidating creature is merely frightened, Arihito teleports it back to the original island to meet the other penguins. Grateful, the penguin drops a White Jewel feather and a Snow Drop crystal, accepts Arihito as its master, and moves into the Monster Ranch with two smaller penguins. To prepare for varied dungeons, the party purchases diverse gear to store in District 7, with Arihito hoping he can continue to protect people as the world's strongest Rearguard.

== See also ==
- My Isekai Life, another light novel series by the same illustrator
- The Strongest Sage with the Weakest Crest, another light novel series by the same illustrator
