= Nanimo nai Kedo Sora wa Aoi =

Japanese manga series

- First tankōbon volume cover

何もないけど空は青い
- Genre: Science fiction
- Manga
- Written by: Hiroyuki Nishimori
- Illustrated by: Yuuki Iinuma
- Published by: Shogakukan
- Imprint: Shōnen Sunday Comics
- Magazine: Weekly Shōnen Sunday
- Original run: March 19, 2014 – August 19, 2015
- Volumes: 7
- icon

Nanimo nai Kedo Sora wa Aoi (何もないけど空は青い; lit. 'There's Nothing, But the Sky is Blue') is a Japanese manga series written by Hiroyuki Nishimori and illustrated by Yuuki Iinuma. It was serialized in Shogakukan's shōnen manga magazine Weekly Shōnen Sunday from March 2014 to August 2015, with its chapters collected in seven tankōbon volumes.

== Publication ==
Written by Hiroyuki Nishimori and illustrated by Yuuki Iinuma, inspired by Nishimori's novel Manten no Hoshi to Aoi Sora, Nanimo nai Kedo Sora wa Aoi was serialized in Shogakukan's shōnen manga magazine Weekly Shōnen Sunday from March 19, 2014, to August 19, 2015. Shogakukan collected its chapters in seven tankōbon volumes, released from July 18, 2014, to November 18, 2015.

=== Volumes ===
No.	Japanese release date	Japanese ISBN
1	July 18, 2014	978-4-09-125068-1
2	October 17, 2014	978-4-09-125364-4
3	December 18, 2014	978-4-09-125419-1
4	March 18, 2015	978-4-09-125629-4
5	June 18, 2015	978-4-09-125849-6
6	September 18, 2015	978-4-09-126229-5
7	November 18, 2015	978-4-09-126482-4
