= Maho Film =

Japanese animation studio

Maho Film Co., Ltd.
- Native name: 株式会社Maho Film
- Romanized name: Kabushiki-gaisha Maho Film
- Type: Kabushiki gaisha
- Industry: Japanese animation
- Founded: May 29, 2018; 8 years ago
- Headquarters: 3-46-4 Asagaya Minami, Suginami, Tokyo, Japan
- Number of locations: 3
- Key people: Junji Murata (CEO)
- Total equity: ¥ 10,000,000
- Number of employees: 65
- Website: mahofilm.com

Maho Film Co., Ltd., (Japanese: 株式会社Maho Film, Hepburn: Kabushiki-gaisha Maho Film) is a Japanese animation studio founded on May 29, 2018, in Suginami-ku.

== Establishment ==
The Suginami-based animation studio was independently founded after current CEO Junji Murata left Ashi Productions in 2018.

The studio's name "Maho" literally stands for "Magic". It symbolizes the studio wishing to create magical content that gives dreams.

== Works ==
=== Television series ===
Title	Director(s)	First run start date	Last run end date	Eps	Note(s)	Ref(s)
If It's for My Daughter, I'd Even Defeat a Demon Lord	Yūji Yanase	July 4, 2019	September 19, 2019	12	Based on a light novel written by Chirolu.	
I'm Standing on a Million Lives	Kumiko Habara	October 2, 2020	December 18, 2020	12	Based on a manga written by Naoki Yamakawa.	
By the Grace of the Gods	Yūji Yanase	October 4, 2020	December 20, 2020	12	Based on a light novel written by Roy.	
I'm Standing on a Million Lives (season 2)	Kumiko Habara	July 10, 2021	September 25, 2021	12	Sequel to I'm Standing on a Million Lives.	
In the Land of Leadale	Yūji Yanase	January 5, 2022	March 23, 2022	12	Based on a light novel written by Ceez.	
I'm the Villainess, So I'm Taming the Final Boss	Kumiko Habara	October 1, 2022	December 17, 2022	12	Based on a light novel written by Sarasa Nagase.	
By the Grace of the Gods (season 2)	Yūji Yanase	January 9, 2023	March 27, 2023	12	Sequel to By the Grace of the Gods.	
My Unique Skill Makes Me OP Even at Level 1	Yūji Yanase	July 8, 2023	September 23, 2023	12	Based on a light novel written by Nazuna Miki.	
A Playthrough of a Certain Dude's VRMMO Life	Yuichi Nakazawa	October 3, 2023	December 19, 2023	12	Based on a light novel written by Shiina Howahowa.	
Doctor Elise: The Royal Lady with the Lamp	Kumiko Habara	January 10, 2024	March 27, 2024	12	Based on a manhwa written by Yuin.	
I'll Become a Villainess Who Goes Down in History	Yūji Yanase	October 2, 2024	December 25, 2024	13	Based on a light novel written by Izumi Okido.	
Blue Miburo	Kumiko Habara	October 19, 2024	March 29, 2025	24	Based on a manga written by Tsuyoshi Yasuda.	
Apocalypse Bringer Mynoghra	Yūji Yanase	July 6, 2025	September 28, 2025	13	Based on a light novel written by Fefu Kazuno.	
Blue Miburo (season 2)	Kumiko Habara	December 20, 2025	March 28, 2026	14	Sequel to Blue Miburo.	
The World's Strongest Rearguard	Yūji Yanase	July 5, 2026	TBA	TBA	Based on a light novel written by Toowa.	
The Insipid Prince's Furtive Grab for the Throne	Yūji Yanase	July 6, 2026	TBA	TBA	Based on a light novel written by Tanba.	
Matsurika Kanriden	Takeshi Mori (chief); Yuichi Nakazawa	January 2027	TBA	TBA	Based on a light novel written by Rinne Ishida.	
