= Kōtetsu no Hanappashira =

Japanese manga series by Hiroyuki Nishimori

- First tankōbon volume cover, featuring Sanemichi Omaezaki

鋼鉄の華っ柱
- Genre: Comedy
- Manga
- Written by: Hiroyuki Nishimori
- Published by: Shogakukan
- Imprint: Shōnen Sunday Comics
- Magazine: Weekly Shōnen Sunday
- Original run: 29 September 2010 – 12 September 2012
- Volumes: 9
- icon

Kōtetsu no Hanappashira (鋼鉄の華っ柱; "Steel Pillar") is a Japanese manga series written and illustrated by Hiroyuki Nishimori. It was serialized in Shogakukan's shōnen manga magazine Weekly Shōnen Sunday from September 2010 to September 2012, with its chapters collected in nine tankōbon volumes.

== Publication ==
Written and illustrated by Hiroyuki Nishimori, Kōtetsu no Hanappashira was serialized in Shogakukan's shōnen manga magazine Weekly Shōnen Sunday from 29 September 2010 to 12 September 2012. Shogakukan collected its chapters in nine tankōbon volumes, released from 18 March 2011 to 16 November 2012.

=== Volumes ===
No.	Japanese release date	Japanese ISBN
1	18 March 2011	978-4-09-122793-5
2	18 April 2011	978-4-09-122856-7
3	15 July 2011	978-4-09-123204-5
4	18 October 2011	978-4-09-123338-7
5	18 January 2012	978-4-09-123538-1
6	18 April 2012	978-4-09-123650-0
7	18 July 2012	978-4-09-123794-1
8	18 October 2012	978-4-09-123894-8
9	16 November 2012	978-4-09-124026-2

== Reception ==
Most of Kōtetsu no Hanappashira's volumes were featured on Oricon's weekly chart of the best-selling manga; volume 2 debuted 26th (41,565 copies sold); volume 3 debuted 28th (27,653 copies sold); volume 4 debuted 25th (42,154 copies sold); volume 5 debuted 16th (37,074 copies sold); volume 6 debuted 19th (36,863 copies sold); volume 9 debuted 29th (21,317 copies sold).
