= Matsurika Kanriden =

Japanese light novel series

- First light novel volume cover

茉莉花官吏伝
- Genre: Romantic fantasy
- Light novel
- Written by: Rinne Ishida
- Illustrated by: Izumi
- Published by: Enterbrain
- Imprint: B's Log Bunko
- Original run: July 15, 2017 – present
- Volumes: 19
- Manga
- Written by: Rinne Ishida
- Illustrated by: Waka Takase
- Published by: Akita Shoten
- Imprint: Princess Comics
- Magazine: Princess
- Original run: August 6, 2018 – present
- Volumes: 12
- Light novel

Jūsansai no Tanjōbi, Kōgō ni Narimashita
- Written by: Rinne Ishida
- Illustrated by: Izumi
- Published by: Enterbrain
- Imprint: B's Log Bunko
- Original run: October 15, 2018 – October 15, 2024
- Volumes: 10
- Manga

Jūsansai no Tanjōbi, Kōgō ni Narimashita
- Written by: Rinne Ishida
- Illustrated by: Mito Aoi
- Published by: Akita Shoten
- Imprint: Princess Comics
- Magazine: Princess
- Original run: March 6, 2020 – present
- Volumes: 10
- Anime television series
- Directed by: Takeshi Mori (chief); Yuichi Nakazawa
- Written by: Touko Machida
- Music by: Takurō Iga
- Studio: Maho Film
- Original run: January 2027 – scheduled

Matsurika Kanriden (茉莉花官吏伝; lit. 'The Tale of the Scholar-Official Matsurika') is a Japanese light novel series written by Rinne Ishida and illustrated by Izumi. Enterbrain have published eighteen volumes since July 2017 under their B's Log Bunko imprint. A manga adaptation with art by Waka Takase has been serialized in Akita Shoten's shōjo manga magazine Princess since August 2018 and has been collected in eleven tankōbon volumes. An anime television series adaptation produced by Maho Film is set to premiere in January 2027.

== Plot ==
Kō was born as a commoner. However, she has a special talent: a good memory. By chance, Kō ends up working as a maid in the palace and eventually becomes a court lady with an official rank. One day, at the instruction of the head lady-in-waiting, she is to stand in for the son of a distinguished family in a rehearsal matchmaking session. However, Emperor Hakuyo of the state of Bai Lou shows up instead. After a bag-snatching incident occurs during the rehearsal, Hakuyo, who is impressed by Kō, decides to make her a government official. Now, Kō is working hard and completing one task after another, while also trying to stay close to the kind yet assertive Hakuyo.

== Characters ==
Kō Matsurika (晧 茉莉花)
Voiced by: Rie Takahashi (voice drama, anime)
Hakuyō (珀陽)
Voiced by: Nobunaga Shimazaki (voice drama, anime)
Tenga Rei (黎 天河, Rei Tenga)
Voiced by: Takeo Ōtsuka (anime)
Shisei Hō (芳 子星, Hō Shisei)
Voiced by: Koutaro Nishiyama (anime)
Shunsetsu Shō (鉦 春雪, Shō Shunsetsu)
Voiced by: Shō Komura (anime)
Akatsuki (暁月)
Voiced by: Takuya Satō (anime)
Lian Lo (蕗莉杏, Lo Lian)
Voiced by: Hiyori Kono (anime)

== Media ==
=== Light novel ===
Written by Rinne Ishida and illustrated by Izumi, Matsurika Kanriden began publication under Enterbrain's B's Log Bunko imprint on July 15, 2017. Nineteen volumes have been released as of October 15, 2026.

A spin-off light novel series, titled Jūsansai no Tanjōbi, Kōgō ni Narimashita (十三歳の誕生日、皇后になりました。), was published in ten volumes under the same imprint on October 15, 2018, to October 15, 2024.

==== Volumes ====
No.	Release date	ISBN
1	July 15, 2017	978-4-04-734704-5
2	December 15, 2017	978-4-04-734705-2
3	April 13, 2018	978-4-04-735087-8
4	August 10, 2018	978-4-04-735088-5
5	February 15, 2019	978-4-04-735490-6
6	May 15, 2019	978-4-04-735489-0
7	October 15, 2019	978-4-04-735779-2
8	March 15, 2020	978-4-04-735780-8
9	November 14, 2020	978-4-04-736407-3
10	May 14, 2021	978-4-04-736574-2
11	November 15, 2021	978-4-04-736842-2
12	March 15, 2022	978-4-04-736953-5
13	October 15, 2022	978-4-04-737212-2
14	March 16, 2023	978-4-04-737402-7
15	October 14, 2023	978-4-04-737687-8
16	May 15, 2024	978-4-04-737963-3
17	April 15, 2025	978-4-04-738351-7
18	October 15, 2025	978-4-04-738629-7
19	October 15, 2026	978-4-04-500275-5

==== Jūsansai no Tanjōbi, Kōgō ni Narimashita ====
No.	Release date	ISBN
1	October 15, 2018	978-4-04-735324-4
2	August 15, 2019	978-4-04-735608-5
3	June 15, 2020	978-4-04-736145-4
4	November 14, 2020	978-4-04-736146-1
5	July 15, 2021	978-4-04-736694-7
6	March 15, 2022	978-4-04-736954-2
7	July 15, 2022	978-4-04-737103-3
8	May 15, 2023	978-4-04-737488-1
9	January 15, 2024	978-4-04-737791-2
10	October 15, 2024	978-4-04-738138-4

=== Manga ===
A manga adaptation illustrated by Waka Takase began serialization in Akita Shoten's shōjo manga magazine Princess on August 6, 2018. The manga's chapters have been compiled into twelve tankōbon volumes as of October 2025.

A manga adaptation of the Jūsansai no Tanjōbi, Kōgō ni Narimashita spin-off series illustrated by Mito Aoi began serialization in the same magazine on March 6, 2020. Its chapters have been compiled into ten tankōbon volumes as of September 2026.

==== Volumes ====
No.	Release date	ISBN
1	May 16, 2019	978-4-253-27456-2
2	March 16, 2020	978-4-253-27457-9
3	November 16, 2020	978-4-253-27458-6
4	July 15, 2021	978-4-253-27459-3
5	March 16, 2022	978-4-253-27460-9
6	October 14, 2022	978-4-253-27461-6
7	March 16, 2023	978-4-253-27462-3
8	September 14, 2023	978-4-253-27463-0
9	April 16, 2024	978-4-253-27464-7
10	October 16, 2024	978-4-253-27465-4
11	April 16, 2025	978-4-253-27466-1
12	October 16, 2025	978-4-253-00458-9

==== Jūsansai no Tanjōbi, Kōgō ni Narimashita ====
No.	Release date	ISBN
1	November 16, 2020	978-4-253-27436-4
2	July 15, 2021	978-4-253-27437-1
3	March 16, 2022	978-4-253-27438-8
4	November 16, 2022	978-4-253-27439-5
5	July 13, 2023	978-4-253-27440-1
6	March 14, 2024	978-4-253-27442-5
7	November 15, 2024	978-4-253-27449-4
8	July 16, 2025	978-4-253-27450-0
9	March 16, 2026	978-4-253-01226-3
10	September 15, 2026	978-4-253-01957-6

=== Anime ===
An anime television series adaptation was announced on October 1, 2025. The series will be produced by Maho Film and directed by Yuichi Nakazawa, with Takeshi Mori serving as chief director, Touko Machida handling series composition, Manami Inose designing the characters, and Takurō Iga composing the music. It is set to premiere in January 2027. The opening theme song is "Hana Hanashi" (花噺; 'Flower Talk') performed by Kana-Boon.

== See also ==
- Mii-chan Wants to Be Kept, a manga series illustrated by Waka Takase
