= Cheeky Angel =

Japanese manga series by Hiroyuki Nishimori

- First tankōbon volume cover, featuring Megumi (front) and Genzō

天使な小生意気 (Tenshi na Konamaiki)
- Genre: Action; Fantasy comedy; Romantic comedy
- Manga
- Written by: Hiroyuki Nishimori
- Published by: Shogakukan
- English publisher: NA: Viz Media (expired)
- Imprint: Shōnen Sunday Comics
- Magazine: Weekly Shōnen Sunday
- Original run: June 2, 1999 – August 27, 2003
- Volumes: 20
- Anime television series
- Directed by: Masaharu Okuwaki
- Produced by: Noriko Kobayashi; Masahito Yoshioka
- Written by: Nobuo Ogizawa
- Music by: Daisuke Ikeda
- Studio: TMS Entertainment
- Original network: TV Tokyo
- Original run: April 7, 2002 – March 30, 2003
- Episodes: 50
- icon

Cheeky Angel (Japanese: 天使な小生意気, Hepburn: Tenshi na Konamaiki) is a Japanese manga series written and illustrated by Hiroyuki Nishimori. It was serialized in Shogakukan's shōnen manga magazine Weekly Shōnen Sunday from June 1999 to August 2003, with its chapters collected in 20 tankōbon volumes. The manga was licensed for English release in North America by Viz Media. The story revolves around the adventures of 15-year-old Megumi Amatsuka, a popular, beautiful tomboy who always gets into fights. Megumi has a hidden secret: she used to be male.

A 50-episode anime television series adaptation, produced by TMS Entertainment, was broadcast on TV Tokyo between April 2002 and March 2003.

In 2001, the manga won the 46th Shogakukan Manga Award for the shōnen category.

== Story ==
At the age of nine, Megumi is an aggressive boy prone to always fighting. One day he saves a strange man from a gang of other children. In return, Megumi receives a magical book. After accidentally bleeding on the book, a genie named Pierrot appears and offers to grant him a wish. Megumi wishes to become a strong man's man. Pierrot, a trickster, inadvertently turns Megumi into a woman. Megumi, furious, throws the book into the riverbank. Believing the only way to reverse the spell is to retrieve the book, Megumi begins a 6-year-long search.

== Characters ==
Megumi Amatsuka (天使 恵, Amatsuka Megumi)
Voiced by: Megumi Hayashibara
While Megumi is physically a very attractive female, she still retains her masculine mannerisms and fighting abilities, which she uses very often, attracting the 'Megu-chan Protection Club', a group of misfit admirers. Nobody else knows she used to be a boy but was transformed into a girl; initially only Megumi's best friend, Miki, knew her secret, however the protection club quickly finds out. Out of all the men at school, the only one who seems to make any headway is Genzō Soga for his unparalleled willingness to do anything to prove himself to Megumi. A tomboy at heart, if she unintentionally displays any sort of affection for anyone, she is very quick to deny everything. It is revealed that she was and always had been a girl. She wished to be a boy because when they were younger, despite being stronger than Genzō, he injured himself to protect her, saying that it was a man's duty to protect a woman, and she wanted to protect Miki from any harm. She confesses her love to Genzō at the end of the series, and kisses him.
Miki Hanakain (花華院 美木, Hanakain Miki)
Voiced by: Makiko Ohmoto
Miki is Megumi's childhood friend and would do anything to help her. She is the only one that remembers the former Megumi and knows of the transformation. She does everything she can to turn Megumi into a better more feminine girl and even goes so far as to threaten to stop being Megumi's friend if she cuts her hair. Miki is extremely loyal to Megumi and has been at her side since pre-school, she even accepted an arranged marriage just so she could go to the same high school as Megumi.
Keiko Tanaka (田中 桂子, Tanaka Keiko)
Voiced by: Naoko Matsui
A spoiled brat and Megumi's rival. She shows up later in the series. She suffers a form of superiority complex. She hates Megumi because she realizes that everyone around her thinks Megumi is more beautiful than she is. Now she follows Megumi where ever she goes in hope of dis-proving Megumi's beauty.
Megumi's father (a.k.a. Megu-papa) (恵の父, Megumi no chichi)
Voiced by: Banjou Ginga
His real name is unknown. Megu-papa is perverted like Yasuda, frequently seen entering Megumi's room through secret entrances he creates without Megumi's permission.
Tsubasa Amatsuka (天使 翼, Amatsuka Tsubasa)
Voiced by: Megumi Urawa
Megumi's mother. Her work requires her to travel around the world, so she is rarely at home.

=== Megu-chan Protection Club ===
Genzō Soga (蘇我 源造, Soga Genzō)
Voiced by: Wataru Takagi
A very stubborn punk who has become Megumi's biggest admirer. The strongest in terms of physical power, Genzō is feared by many at school and various gangs in the city. Megumi is upset that Genzō has mistreated his most recent girlfriend and beats him up, the first person to do it since at least grade school. Soon after that incident, Genzō quickly falls head over heels in love for Megumi. On his 16th birthday, Genzō proposed to Megumi but he was rejected. It is revealed that Genzō received his scar protecting Megumi from falling glass while she was rescuing Miki from kidnappers. Genzō often refers to Megumi as Megu-chan as a sign affection. Megumi finally reciprocates his feelings, and the two kiss.
Ichirō Fujiki (藤木 一郎, Fujiki Ichirō)
Voiced by: Kazunari Tanaka
An "average" boy trying to escape his reputation for being weird and a pervert at his previous school. While appearing physically inferior to Genzō, he has fought to defend himself and Megumi on several occasions. Near the end of the series, he seemed to have accepted the role as Yoshimi's 'Prince'.
Tasuke Yasuda (安田 太助, Yasuda Tasuke)
Voiced by: Yuji Ueda
The perverted and yet good-hearted nerd who nosebleeds when he gets overly excited. Yasuda is the weakest when it comes to physical prowess, but his intelligence continues to surprise everyone and aids the group solving many problems. He has a little brother that looks like a mini version of him and the same personality. Yasuda looks like a cute girl when his glasses are removed.
Hitomoji Kobayashi (小林 一文字, Kobayashi Hitomoji)
Voiced by: Nobuyuki Hiyama
A samurai in-training and arguably the most decent man in the group. Kobayashi is the second strongest, having learned martial arts since childhood. Near the end of the series he seems to develop some feelings for Miki.

=== Other characters ===
Yoriko (頼子)
Amatsuka's housemaid. She was always seen Megumi's investigator and a substitute for Tsubasa in times of need. She even helped Megu by revising the rules of Yamato Nadeshiko Cup in order for the rules to be fair and square.
Takao Gakusan (岳山 隆雄, Gakusan Takao)
He was supposed to be Miki's "fiance". He was beaten up by Genzō in duel when he posed as Miki's boyfriend to protect her. He planned to kidnap Miki but he was defeated by the Megu-group.
Reiko (礼子)
A thief that Megumi met in Osaka. She was saved by Megumi after a near-death experience. Along with Megumi, Genzō, and Fujiki, they have helped the police capture a yakuza. She helped Megumi find magic books, a bone, and a scroll (which of course, she obtained by stealing).
Yoshimi Shirasagi (白鷺 良美, Shirasagi Yoshimi)
Keiko's friend. She fell in love with Genzō because he saved in the nick of time. Somehow, the feelings changed when she was saved by Fujiki, who caught her when she fell in a stairwell during their field trip to Kyoto. She calls Fujiki her "prince".
Setsuka Soga (蘇我 雪花, Soga Setsuka)
Genzō's "Big Sister". She saves Megumi when Genzō tries to "make her happy". She was amazed at how Megumi changed Genzō from a delinquent to a charming person. She wants Megumi to refer to her as "Onee-san".
Yanagisawa (柳沢)
A punk that Megumi and Genzō met during the Yamato Nadeshiko Cup. He was defeated by Genzō. He was hired by Takao Gakusan to kidnap Miki.

== Media ==
=== Manga ===
Written and illustrated by Hiroyuki Nishimori, Cheeky Angel was serialized in Shogakukan's shōnen manga magazine Weekly Shōnen Sunday from June 2, 1999, to August 27, 2003. The individual chapters were compiled and published by Shogakukan in twenty tankōbon volumes, released between September 18, 1999, and September 18, 2003.

The manga was published in English by Viz Media. The twenty volumes were released between June 16, 2004, and January 9, 2008, Viz Media published the series digitally between May 12, 2015, and February 23, 2016. In March 2021, Viz Media confirmed that they no longer holds the series' license.

==== Volumes ====
No.	Original release date	Original ISBN	English release date	English ISBN
1	September 18, 1999	4-09-125631-7	June 16, 2004	1-59116-397-8
2	December 10, 1999	4-09-125632-5	September 14, 2004	1-59116-467-2
3	March 18, 2000	4-09-125633-3	November 17, 2004	1-59116-503-2
4	June 17, 2000	4-09-125634-1	January 11, 2005	1-59116-620-9
5	August 9, 2000	4-09-125635-X	March 8, 2005	1-59116-631-4
6	November 18, 2000	4-09-125636-8	May 10, 2005	1-59116-774-4
7	February 17, 2001	4-09-125635-X	July 12, 2005	1-59116-839-2
8	April 18, 2001	4-09-125638-4	September 26, 2005	1-59116-979-8
9	June 18, 2001	4-09-125639-2	November 8, 2005	1-4215-0069-8
10	August 3, 2003	4-09-125640-6	January 10, 2006	1-4215-0167-8
11	November 17, 2001	4-09-126311-9	March 14, 2006	1-4215-0317-4
12	January 18, 2002	4-09-126312-7	May 9, 2006	1-4215-0446-4
13	April 18, 2002	4-09-126313-5	July 11, 2006	1-4215-0447-2
14	June 18, 2002	4-09-126314-3	September 12, 2006	1-4215-0448-0
15	September 18, 2002	4-09-126315-1	November 14, 2006	1-4215-0449-9
16	December 18, 2002	4-09-126316-X	January 9, 2007	1-4215-0450-2
17	February 18, 2003	4-09-126317-8	April 10, 2007	1-4215-0886-9
18	May 17, 2003	4-09-126318-6	July 10, 2007	1-4215-0887-7
19	August 8, 2003	4-09-126319-4	October 9, 2007	1-4215-0888-5
20	September 18, 2003	4-09-126320-8	January 8, 2008	1-4215-0889-3

=== Anime ===
A 50-episode anime television series adaptation, produced by TMS Entertainment and directed by Masaharu Okuwaki, was broadcast on TV Tokyo from April 7, 2002, to March 30, 2003. The series two opening themes were performed by Aiko Kitahara; Grand Blue (episodes 1–26) and "Sun Rise Train" (episodes 27–50). The series four ending themes were performed by U-ka Saegusa in dB; "Whenever I Think of You" (episodes 1–13), "It's for You" (episodes 14–26), "Tears Go By" (episodes 27–37) and "Secret and Lies" (episodes 38–49), while the last episode featured the series first opening theme Grand Blue by Aiko Kitahara as the ending theme.

== Reception ==
In 2001, the manga won the 46th Shogakukan Manga Award for the shōnen category.

Eduardo M. Chavez, reviewing the first manga volume for Anime on DVD, wrote that the protagonist, Megumi, "entertains and creates situations that are shocking and equally hilarious", described the supporting cast as "pretty solid", and called the title "entertaining." In a review of the third volume, he praised the development of Megumi and the characters overall. Liann Cooper of Anime News Network, in a review of the first manga volume, described it as "quite funny and charming", the artwork as adequate, and the concept as amusing, though he noted that "Megumi's situations get old" and expressed hope that later volumes would offer more storyline, finding the manga only "mildly entertaining." Cooper later stated that he enjoyed the second volume, which he found artistically impressive and fitting "the bill for being an enjoyable series".

Janet Crocker of Anime Fringe called the first manga volume enjoyable, noting that although it resembled Ranma ½, the story was "highly interesting" with fast pacing and substantial fight action, that the issue of gender identity was treated "very seriously", and that it was a "great manga." Reviewing the sixteenth manga volume, Holly Ellingwood of Active Animecalled it a "very unusual drama" that was "intriguing", describing the protagonist's struggle for self-acceptance with the "full knowledge [that] she is a guy despite her female body", and added that the manga was a "distinct story with an equally uniquely stylized art style."

J.P. Arevalo of Anime Fringe described the anime as having "laugh-out-loud humor" and praised its blend of drama and comedy.
