= Dōshirō de Gozaru =

Japanese manga series by Hiroyuki Nishimori

- First volume cover, featuring Doshiro Kiriu

道士郎でござる
- Genre: Gag comedy
- Manga
- Written by: Hiroyuki Nishimori
- Published by: Shogakukan
- Imprint: Shōnen Sunday Comics
- Magazine: Weekly Shōnen Sunday
- Original run: 28 April 2004 – 4 January 2006
- Volumes: 8
- icon

Dōshirō de Gozaru (道士郎でござる; "I'm Doshiro") is a Japanese manga series written and illustrated by Hiroyuki Nishimori. It was serialized in Shogakukan's shōnen manga magazine Weekly Shōnen Sunday from May 2004 to January 2006, with its chapters collected in eight tankōbon volumes.

== Plot ==
Returning to Japan after twelve years in America, Doshiro Kiriu (桐柳 道士郎, Kiriu Dōshirō) is inexplicably dressed in the full attire of a samurai. His appearance constantly provokes fights with delinquents, all of whom he easily defeats. After a particular incident, classmate Kensuke Kosaka (小坂 健助, Kosaka Kensuke) began loyally serving him as his lord. When a classmate, Erika Shirase (白瀬 エリカ, Shirase Erika), is falsely accused of theft by a teacher and a delinquent named Shibayama (芝山), Kensuke uncovers the conspiracy. Although her name is cleared, their methods force Doshiro, Kensuke, Erika, and another student, Ai Saotome (早乙女 愛, Saotome Ai), to leave the school. The group subsequently transfers to Akehisa Third High, the most notorious school for delinquents in the region.

== Publication ==
Written and illustrated by Hiroyuki Nishimori, Dōshirō de Gozaru was serialized in Shogakukan's shōnen manga magazine Weekly Shōnen Sunday from 28 April 2004 to 4 January 2006. (Note: It started in the magazine's combined 22nd–23rd issue of 2004 (cover date 12 May), released on 28 April of that same year.) (Note: It finished in the magazine's combined 5th–6th issue of 2006 (cover date 21 January), released on 4 January of that same year.) Shogakukan collected its chapters in eight tankōbon volumes, released from 6 August 2004 to 17 February 2006. Shogakukan republished the series in a four-volume wideban edition from 18 October 2013 to 17 January 2014.

=== Volumes ===
No.	Japanese release date	Japanese ISBN
1	6 August 2004	978-4-09-127171-6
2	18 November 2004	978-4-09-127172-3
3	18 February 2005	978-4-09-127173-0
4	18 April 2005	978-4-09-127174-7
5	15 July 2005	978-4-09-127175-4
6	16 September 2005	978-4-09-127176-1
7	15 December 2005	978-4-09-127177-8
8	17 February 2006	978-4-09-120089-1
