= Manten no Hoshi to Aoi Sora =

Japanese novel

- Cover of the novel

満天の星と青い空
- Genre: Survival
- Novel
- Written by: Hiroyuki Nishimori
- Published by: Shogakukan
- Published: July 18, 2012
- Manga
- Written by: Hiroyuki Nishimori
- Illustrated by: Yuuki Iinuma
- Published by: Shogakukan
- Magazine: Monthly Sunday Gene-X
- Original run: August 18, 2018 – September 19, 2019
- Volumes: 3

Manten no Hoshi to Aoi Sora (満天の星と青い空; "The Starry Heavens and the Blue Sky") is a Japanese novel written by manga artist Hiroyuki Nishimori, published in 2012. A manga adaptation, illustrated by Yuuki Iinuma, was serialized in Shogakukan's seinen manga magazine Monthly Sunday Gene-X from August 2018 to September 2019.

== Media ==
=== Novel ===
Manten no Hoshi to Aoi Sora, written by manga artist Hiroyuki Nishimori. It is Nishimori's debut work as novelist. An excerpt from the start of the novel was published by Shogakukan in Weekly Shōnen Sunday on June 13, 2012, and the novel was published on July 18 of the same year.

=== Manga ===
A manga adaptation, illustrated by Yuuki Iinuma, was serialized in Shogakukan's seinen manga magazine Monthly Sunday Gene-X from August 18, 2018, to September 19, 2019. Shogakukan collected its chapters in three tankōbon volumes (the last volume was digital only published), released from December 12, 2018, to December 19, 2019.

== See also ==
- Nanimo nai Kedo Sora wa Aoi, another manga by Nishimori and Iinuma, inspired by the novel
