= Hiroyuki Nishimori =

Japanese manga artist

- Born: 23 November 1963 (age 62); Tokyo, Japan
- Occupation: Manga artist
- Known for: Kyō Kara Ore Wa!!; Cheeky Angel; Ocha Nigosu

Hiroyuki Nishimori (西森 博之, Nishimori Hiroyuki; born 23 November 1963) is a Japanese manga artist, known for his works Kyō Kara Ore Wa!! (1988–1997) and Cheeky Angel (1999–2003). The latest won the 46th Shogakukan Manga Award in the shōnen category in 2001.

== Works ==
=== Manga ===
==== Serialized ====
- Kyō Kara Ore Wa!! (今日から俺は!!) (1989–1997); serialized in Shogakukan's Shōnen Sunday Zōkan and Weekly Shōnen Sunday.
- Amaku Kiken na Nampa Deka (甘く危険なナンパ刑事) (1990); serialized in Shogakukan's Weekly Shōnen Sunday.
- Spin Out (スピンナウト, Supinnauto) (1998–1999); serialized in Shogakukan's Weekly Shōnen Sunday.
- Cheeky Angel (天使な小生意気, Tenshi na Konamaiki) (1999–2003); serialized in Shogakukan's Weekly Shōnen Sunday; published in English by Viz Media.
- Dōshirō de Gozaru (道士郎でござる) (2004–2006); serialized in Shogakukan's Weekly Shōnen Sunday.
- Ocha Nigosu (お茶にごす) (2007–2009); serialized in Shogakukan's Weekly Shōnen Sunday.
- Kōtetsu no Hanappashira (鋼鉄の華っ柱) (2010–2012); serialized in Shogakukan's Weekly Shōnen Sunday.
- Nanimo nai Kedo Sora wa Aoi (何もないけど空は青い) (art by Yuuki Iinuma) (2014–2015); serialized in Shogakukan's Weekly Shōnen Sunday.
- Hiiragi-sama wa Jibun o Sagashiteiru (柊様は自分を探している。) (2016–2017); serialized in Shogakukan's Weekly Shōnen Sunday.
- Kyō Kara Ore Wa!!: Yūsha Sagawa to Ano Futari-hen (今日から俺は!!～勇者サガワとあの二人編～) (2018–2019); serialized in Shogakukan's Shōnen Sunday S.
- Kanakana (カナカナ) (2020–present); serialized in Shogakukan's Shōnen Sunday S.

==== Other ====
- Pū Tarō (プー太郎) (1987); one-shot debut, published in Shogakukan's Shōnen Sunday Zōkan.
- Tsuppari Shakainideru (ツッパリ社会に出る) (1990); one-shot published in Shogakukan's Weekly Young Sunday.
- A-ko (A子) (2006–2007) – Five chapters irregularly serialized in Shogakukan's Weekly Young Sunday. (Note: * Jimuin A-ko (事務員A子); * Shukudai Mesukōsei A-ko (宿題女子高生A子); * Arubaito Tisshukubari A-ko (アルバイトティッシュ配りA子); * Jimu-in A-ko -Katsudon-hen- (事務員A子 -カツ丼編-); * Kēki-ya A-ko (ケーキ屋A子))
- Itsuka Sora kara (いつか空から) (2010); two chapters published in Shogakukan's Monthly Shōnen Sunday and discontinued.
- Hiroyuki Nishimori's Short Stories (西森博之短編集, Nishimori Hiroyuki Tanpenshū) (2019); collection of Nishimori's nine one-shot stories, including: Pū Tarō; Tsuppari Shakainideru; Moshimo Negai ga Kanaunara (もしも願いがかなうなら); Nanpa (軟派 NANPA); Nanpa no Takahashi (軟派の高橋); The A-ko's five chapters; Banchō-ya (番長屋); Maga Sasu (魔がさす); and Super Charger.

=== Novels ===
- Manten no Hoshi to Aoi Sora (満天の星と青い空) (2012)—adapted into a manga series by Yuuki Iinuma serialized in Shogakukan's Monthly Sunday Gene-X (2018–2019).
- Ore no Shinzō wa Kanojo ni Shika Uchinu Kenai (俺の心臓は彼女にしか撃ち抜けない) (2014)
