= Kyō Kara Ore Wa!! =

Japanese manga series by Hiroyuki Nishimori and its adaptations

- First tankōbon volume cover, featuring Shinji Itō (left) and Takashi Mitsuhashi

今日から俺は!!
- Genre: Comedy, Yankī
- Manga
- Written by: Hiroyuki Nishimori
- Published by: Shogakukan
- Imprint: Shōnen Sunday Comics
- Magazine: Shōnen Sunday Zōkan (1988–1990); Weekly Shōnen Sunday (1990–1997)
- Original run: September 10, 1988 – November 5, 1997
- Volumes: 38
- Original video animation
- Directed by: Takeshi Mori; Masami Annō
- Produced by: Masako Fukuyo; Reiko Fukakusa
- Written by: Yukiyoshi Ôhashi
- Music by: Kimio Nomura (1); Ryō Kawakami (2–10)
- Studio: Studio Pierrot
- Released: April 1, 1993 – December 21, 1997
- Runtime: 50 minutes (each)
- Episodes: 10
- Live-action film
- Directed by: Tsutomu Kashima
- Released: February 19, 1994
- Runtime: 93 minutes
- Television drama
- Directed by: Yuichi Fukuda
- Written by: Yuichi Fukuda
- Music by: Eiji Segawa
- Original network: Nippon TV
- Original run: October 14, 2018 – December 16, 2018
- Episodes: 10
- Manga

Yūsha Sagawa to Ano Futari-hen
- Written by: Hiroyuki Nishimori
- Published by: Shogakukan
- Imprint: Shōnen Sunday Comics Special
- Magazine: Shōnen Sunday S
- Original run: November 24, 2018 – February 25, 2019
- Volumes: 1
- Live-action film
- Directed by: Yuichi Fukuda
- Written by: Yuichi Fukuda
- Music by: Eiji Segawa
- Studio: Toho
- Released: July 17, 2020
- Runtime: 94 minutes
- icon

Kyō Kara Ore Wa!! (今日から俺は!!; 'From Today, It's My Turn!!') is a Japanese manga series written and illustrated by Hiroyuki Nishimori. It was initially published in Shogakukan's shōnen manga magazine Shōnen Sunday Zōkan, running monthly from September 1988 to August 1990. The series was then transferred to Weekly Shōnen Sunday and serialized from September 1990 to November 1997. Its chapters were collected in 38 tankōbon volumes. A four-chapter manga sequel, titled Kyō Kara Ore wa!!: Yūsha Sagawa to Ano Futari-hen, was serialized in Shōnen Sunday S from November 2018 to February 2019 and collected in a single tankōbon volume.

Kyō Kara Ore Wa!! was adapted into a 10-episode original video animation (OVA) series by Studio Pierrot, released from April 1993 to December 1997. The series also spawned a V-Cinema direct-to-video live-action series launched from 1993 to 1997, and a live-action film, featuring the same cast and staff from the V-Cinema series, premiered in February 1994. A Japanese television drama adaptation was broadcast on Nippon Television in 2018, and a live-action film, featuring the same cast and staff from the drama, premiered in July 2020.

By March 2018, the Kyō Kara Ore Wa!! manga had over 40 million copies in circulation.

== Story ==
Two boys, Takashi Mitsuhashi and Shinji Itō, meet each other at a salon. It turns out both boys are transferring to a new school and they decide to take the opportunity to reinvent themselves, to no longer be the run-of-the-mill high school students they used to be, and become the greatest delinquents in Japan.

== Characters ==
=== Nanyou High ===
Takashi Mitsuhashi (三橋 貴志, Mitsuhashi Takashi)
Voiced by: Yasunori Matsumoto
Portrayed by: Kento Kaku
A sly high school student. He gave up his ordinary school life and decided to "become a delinquent from today on", after moving to his new home in Chiba. Being a very athletic person, he used his talent for the sole purpose of brawling and actually becomes a real delinquent. To make his appearance more noticeable, he dyed his hair blond. Being the most self-centered person in the story, his own safety comes before anyone else's, he often sacrifices his "friends" for his cause. He is greedy and cunning. Although, beneath his devilish personality lies a softer side, which shows from time to time, especially when he is angry. His fighting style is based around his speed, as he dodges most attacks, becoming surprised whenever he is forced to block due to being faster than most of the people he encounters. His love interest is Riko Akasaka.
Shinji Itō (伊藤 真司, Itō Shinji)
Voiced by: Hideyuki Hori
Portrayed by: Kentaro Ito
A complete reversal of Mitsuhashi, Itō is the kind of righteous person fighting for justice. Just like Mitsuhashi, Itō got transferred to Nan High's first year. Like his personality, his fighting style is also the opposite of Mitsuhashi's; he is incredibly tough and often stands up from any beating, even in the bleakest of situations. While he may be as strong as Mitsuhashi, Itō is beat up much more often than Mitsuhashi due to often sacrificing himself to protect others as well as fighting fair in unfair situations or against numerous opponents. Due to helping her, he wins the affection of Kyōko, an ex-delinquent girl, at the start of the series.
Riko Akasaka (赤坂 理子, Akasaka Riko)
Voiced by: Fumie Kusachi
Portrayed by: Nana Seino
The only daughter of the Akasaka style dojo. Originally she visited another senior high school than Mitsuhashi and Itō, but ultimately decided to transfer to Nan High instead to repay Mitsuhashi's favor. Behind her pretty looks lies someone pretty skilled in Aikido; she can handle most delinquents on her own despite her small body size. While she used to be very popular at her old school, in Nan High she is initially considered "weird" because of her constantly hanging out with Mitsuhashi. She spends more and more time with Mitsuhashi, and he sometimes intrudes in her home/dojo, often irritating her father, who also seems to get used to Mitsuhashi. She is romantically interested in Mitsuhashi and is one of the people close to him who know his softer side. She is the only person who refers to Mitsuhashi as "San-chan" because 三 (mitsu) is also read as the number three (san).
Ryō Tanaka (田中 良, Tanaka Ryō)
Voiced by: Masami Kikuchi
Student of the Akasaka style dojo, and in love with Riko. His sense of justice is as strong as Itō's, and he is a modest person who is willing to help people in need out whenever he can. Despite his initially weak body, he never backed down to any delinquent's threat. He was transferred to Nan High together with Riko, which is why everyone calls him "Ryou-kun" like Riko does. Surprisingly, he can hold his own against Mitsuhashi.
Shūichi Takasaki (高崎 秀一, Takasaki Shūichi)
A transfer student from Saitama. He originally transferred to Nan High to avoid trouble at his home place of Saitama during the Kitagawa incident, and was quickly at enmity with Mitsuhashi because of his righteous nature, even more so than Itō. When he first appeared, he seems to have an equal charm towards girls as Itō, which only grew when he defeated the duo in a match of Judo. At the end of the Kitagawa incident, he got to know Mitsuhashi's true nature and became friend with them, aiding them multiple times in battle in order to repay their favor. A running gag in the story, is whenever Itō is doing something emotional with Kyōko, he appears and witness an embarrassing scene.
Naoya Sagawa (佐川 直也, Sagawa Naoya)
Portrayed by: Reiya Masaki
A delinquent from Nan High, who quickly became Mitsuhashi's and Itō's lackey and informant due to his nature "always succumbing to the circumstances". Even though he is no strong fighter, people respect him for the sole sake of him being able to call for Itō and Mitsuhashi's help at any given time.
Keiichi Izawa (伊沢 圭一, Izawa Keiichi)
A delinquent and good friend with Sagawa, also being considered a lackey of Mitsuhashi and Itō.
Megumi (メグミ, Megumi)
Riko's girl friend at Nan High, with lots of screentime, but very few times they refer to her with her name.
Yūichi Sakakigawa (榊原雄一, Sakakigawa Yuuichi)
A junior with passable strength, at least 2 years younger than Mitsuhashi. Mitsuhashi gave him the nickname of "pisshead" because he once peed on them while they were trapped in a well. When introduced, he is an overconfident middle school student and tries to defeat Mitsuhashi. However, he soon gains immense respect for Mitsuhashi after witnessing his strength and looks up to him. Mitsuhashi regards him as a bud despite his young age.

=== Seiran Girl School ===
Kyōko Hayakawa (早川 京子, Hayakawa Kyōko)
Voiced by: Yumi Ichihara
Portrayed by: Kanna Hashimoto
A former sukeban girl. She becomes Itō's girlfriend near the beginning of the series after he takes a beating in order to rescue her from a group of thugs. Her parents approve of her dating Itō and are just grateful that she is not dating Mitsuhashi.

=== Benibane High ===
Katsutoshi Imai (今井 勝俊, Imai Katsutoshi)
Voiced by: Yūsaku Yara
Portrayed by: Taiga Nakano
Beni high's banchō, the eldest son of four brothers. Despite his incredible strength, his intelligence is not up to scratch. Even though he looks handsome at first glance, he cannot get a girlfriend because he often unintentionally ends up looking like a fool. Imai possesses impressive strength, usually throwing his opponents. However, he still could not win against many of his rivals. Mitsuhashi often tries to hinder Imai, especially when good things happen to him. Itō, on the other hand, usually gets along with Imai, respecting his honest efforts. He is often looking for ways to better himself.
Yasuo Tanigawa (谷川 安夫, Tanigawa Yasuo)
Voiced by: Kazuki Yao
Portrayed by: Yūma Yamoto
Imai's lackey and best friend. He respects Imai wholeheartedly and made a promise to follow Imai his entire life. He tends to get involved in a lot of troubles with Imai, and because of his small size, he's usually the first to get picked on. Despite his lack of strength, he has a lot of spirit, which sometimes intimidates people.
Tarō Koyama (小山 太郎, Koyama Tarō)
Voiced by: Wataru Takagi
An obese giant, who also decided to follow Imai as his lackey, after he was defeated in a fight. It is implied that he has anger issues and was thus expelled from his old school. His size makes him a formidable fighter even Imai acknowledges. He likes to refer to Imai as "aniki".
Makoto Nakano (中野 誠, Nakano Makoto)
Voiced by: Nobuyuki Hiyama
Originally from Ibaraki, Nakano transferred to Beni high due to his quarrel with the local yakuza boss' son. Despite his short stature, he was able to fight on par with Itō and Mitsuhashi during their school trip to Kyoto. His original goal in going to Chiba was to defeat Mitsuhashi, although he later settles in and even joins them in their raid of Akehisa.

=== Akehisa High ===
Satoshi Katagiri (片桐智司, Katagiri Satoshi)
Voiced by: Akio Ōtsuka
Portrayed by: Nobuyuki Suzuki
Being the banchō of the delinquent high school Akehisa, he is feared among his enemies and respected amongst his fellowship. He is on par with Mitsuhashi strength-wise, but stopped with his delinquent career the moment he stepped out of his school and entered society.
Takeshi Sagara (相良猛, Sagara Takeshi)
Voiced by: Kōji Tsujitani
Portrayed by: Hayato Isomura
He is as dangerous as a rabid dog. His methods are as dirty as Mitsuhashi's, however his own twisted character makes him always go a step further than Mitsuhashi. He is the only person who managed to completely disable Mitsuhashi's abilities during their last encounter by severely injuring him.
Suenaga (末永, Suenaga)
Satoshi's successors as head (banchō) of Akehisa, he lacks his predecessor strength and characters, often using Akehisa sheer number and name to avoid actual fighting.

=== Others ===
Ryōko Morigawa (森川涼子, Morigawa Ryōko)
Portrayed by: Maika Yamamoto
A girl who usually fights with a shinai. When she is introduced into the story, she notices her cousin Satoru's bruises from Hokunei. Satoru lies and tells her that it was Mitsuhashi who did it, in order to keep her out of it. However, that only makes things worse and she tries going after Mitsuhashi and the others. Later on, she develops a crush on Imai due to his good nature. She was herself a (unwilling) delinquent and decided to change herself to a normal girl when she transferred, although it did not last very long and she soon became respected by the other delinquents of her new school.
Tetsuya Kurosaki (黒崎鉄矢, Kurosaki Tetsuya)

== Media ==
=== Manga ===
Written and illustrated by Hiroyuki Nishimori, Kyō Kara Ore Wa!! was first serialized in Shogakukan's shōnen manga magazine Shōnen Sunday Zōkan, running monthly from September 10, 1988, to August 10, 1990. It was transferred to the magazine Weekly Shōnen Sunday, where it ran from September 19, 1990, to November 5, 1997. Shogakukan collected its chapters in 38 tankōbon volumes, released from December 14, 1989, to March 18, 1998. Shogakukan re-published the series in a 19-volume wide-ban edition released from August 9, 2000, to August 8, 2003, and a 18-volume bunkoban edition released from April 15, 2011, to August 10, 2012.

A series of special new chapters, under the title Kyō Kara Ore wa!!: Yūsha Sagawa to Ano Futari-hen (今日から俺は!!～勇者サガワとあの二人編～), were published in Shōnen Sunday S from November 24, 2018, to February 25, 2019. These chapters were compiled into a single tankōbon volume published on April 18, 2019.

==== Volumes ====
No.	Japanese release date	Japanese ISBN
01	December 14, 1989	4-09-122401-6
001. "Delinquent Youth" (ツッパリ少年編, "Tsuppari Shōnen Hen"); 002. "The Hated" (嫌われ者編, "Kiraware Mono Hen"); 003. "Female High School Students" (女子高生編, "Joshikōsei Hen"); 004. "Criminals" (犯罪者編, "Hanzaisha Hen"); 005. "Cheapshots" (卑怯者編, Hikyōmono Hen"); 006. "Ruffians" (悪者編, "Warumono Hen"); 007. "Skirt Chasers" (軟派少年編, "Nanpa Shōnen Hen")
02	May 18, 1990	4-09-122402-4
03	October 18, 1990	4-09-122403-2
04	March 18, 1991	4-09-122404-0
05	April 18, 1991	4-09-122405-9
06	June 18, 1991	4-09-122406-7
07	September 18, 1991	4-09-122407-5
08	November 18, 1991	4-09-122408-3
09	January 18, 1992	4-09-122409-1
10	March 18, 1992	4-09-122410-5
11	May 18, 1992	4-09-123051-2
12	July 17, 1992	4-09-123052-0
13	October 17, 1992	4-09-123053-9
14	February 18, 1993	4-09-123054-7
15	May 18, 1993	4-09-123055-5
16	July 17, 1993	4-09-123056-3
17	October 18, 1993	4-09-123057-1
18	December 11, 1993	4-09-123058-X
19	March 18, 1994	4-09-123059-8
20	June 18, 1994	4-09-123060-1
21	August 10, 1994	4-09-123391-0
22	December 10, 1994	4-09-123392-9
23	March 18, 1995	4-09-123393-7
24	June 17, 1995	4-09-123394-5
25	July 18, 1995	4-09-123395-3
26	November 18, 1995	4-09-123396-1
27	March 18, 1996	4-09-123397-X
28	May 18, 1996	4-09-123398-8
29	August 10, 1996	4-09-123399-6
30	October 18, 1996	4-09-123400-3
31	January 18, 1997	4-09-125181-1
32	March 18, 1997	4-09-125182-X
33	May 17, 1997	4-09-125183-8
34	July 18, 1997	4-09-125184-6
35	October 18, 1997	4-09-125185-4
36	December 10, 1997	4-09-125186-2
37	February 18, 1998	4-09-125187-0
38	March 18, 1998	4-09-125188-9

=== Original video animation ===
Kyō Kara Ore Wa!! was adapted into a ten-episode original video animation (OVA) series by Studio Pierrot and directed by Takeshi Mori and Masami Anō. The episodes were released from April 1, 1993, to December 21, 1997.

==== Episodes ====
No.	Title	Original release date
1	"From Today, It's My Turn!!"; Transliteration: "Kyō Kara Ore Wa!" (Japanese: 今日から俺は！！)	April 1, 1993
Fifteen-year-old Takashi Mitsuhashi has just moved to Chiba and decides to use this opportunity to reinvent himself as an "improvised rebel", also having his hair dyed blonde and permed to increase his flashiness. Outside the salon, he meets Shinji Itō, another recently moved boy and, coincidentally, another improvised rebel. It turns out both boys are in the same class at Nanyou High, but they had to put their mutual distrust aside and join forces against the school's delinquents, eager to put the two flashy juniors in line. Mitsuhashi also meets – and humiliates – the head of the Benibane High, the as–strong–as–dimwit Imai, who swears eternal revenge against him. In the end Mitsuhashi and Itō defeat the whole school gang and their banchō Shiratori one by one, as well as a group of thugs who had kidnapped Kyōko, a former delinquent girl who eventually becomes Itō's girlfriend.
2	"The Crimson Coward Against the Sunset"; Transliteration: "Yūhi ni Akai Hikyo-mono" (Japanese: 夕日に赤いヒキョー者)	May 1, 1994
Mitsuhashi is envious of Itō who got engaged to Kyōko while girls seem to avoid him. Meanwhile Imai, who is continuing to seek revenge on Mitsuhashi, meets Riko whom he instantly falls in love with, and is horrified when he discovers that she has feelings for Mitsuhashi (who saved her from some thugs some time before). Broken, he inadvertently messes with the wretched Sagara and other delinquents of the infamous Akehisa High; much to Imai's surprise, Mitsuhashi comes to his rescue, only to abandon him at the bottom of a canal to save himself. Later, Itō beats Sagara but is in turn beaten by Akehisa's banchō Satoshi and his henchmen. Pretending indifference, Mitsuhashi challenges Sagara and outwits him in unfair combat. Meanwhile, Imai saves Kyōko from two from Akehisa, only to be soundly beaten by all the rest of the gang. At the final scene, Imai threatens revenge on Mitsuhashi who continues to mock him, while Riko leaves a heart-shaped gift on Mitsuhashi's briefcase.
3	"The Most Selfish Man in Japan"; Transliteration: "Nihonichi no Wagamama Otoko" (Japanese: 日本一のワガママ男)	August 1, 1994
At work, Imai comes to the conclusion that his misfortunes are due to his goodness, so he decides to become a dishonest just like Mitsuhashi. Nevertheless, he promptly saves Riko from Sagara, but is beaten up by the Akehisa gang. Itō and Mitsuhashi arrive to the rescue and the latter, angry with Sagara for mistreating Riko, beats him fiercely. Back to the Akehisa High, Satoshi is scolded by the former banchō who feels that their school's reputation is in danger. Angered, Satoshi gathers the whole gang for a decisive confrontation from which Mitsuhashi and Itō emerge as winners, also thanks to the support of Imai and Riko. Satoshi flees, but is later tracked down by Mitsuhashi for a final duel. He proves to be tough, but is ultimately defeated and admits Mitsuhashi's strength. Itō arrives but although instigated by Satoshi, refuses to fight a beaten opponent and leave.
4	"And Yet, You're Going to Kyoto"; Transliteration: "Na no ni Anata wa Kyōto e iku no!" (Japanese: なのにあなたは京都へいくの！)	May 1, 1995
5	"Unknown, Broke and Underhanded"; Transliteration: "Namonaku Mazushiku Zurukkoku" (Japanese: 名もなく貧しくズルッこく)	November 1, 1995
6	"Counterstrike: Lullaby"; Transliteration: "Gyakushü・Bōtodachi no Rarabai" (Japanese: 逆襲・暴徒達のララバイ)	February 1, 1996
7	"Operation: Best Buds – Go! Go! Go!"; Transliteration: "Mabudachi Sakusen Go！Go！Go！" (Japanese: マブダチ作戦Go！Go！Go！)	August 1, 1996
8	"Bombing on a Dojo Challenge"; Transliteration: "Dōjō Yaburi o Buttobase!" (Japanese: 道場やぶりをブッ飛ばせ!)	December 21, 1996
9	"Once Upon a Time in Chiba"; Transliteration: "Wansu Apon a Taimu in Chiba" (Japanese: ワンス・アポン・ア・タイム・イン・千葉)	December 21, 1997
10	"On the Run from the Yakuza"; Transliteration: "Gokudō no Tsumahajiki-dachi" (Japanese: 極道のつまはじき達)	December 21, 1997

=== V-Cinema live-action series ===
Toei Video released a series of V-Cinema direct-to-video live-action series:

- Kyō Kara Ore Wa!! (今日から俺は!!) – January 8, 1993
- Kyō Kara Ore Wa!! 2 (今日から俺は！！ 2) – July 9, 1993
- Kyō Kara Ore Wa!! Nan demo ari no 17 sai (今日から俺は！！電撃の17才) – January 13, 1995
- Kyō Kara Ore Wa!! Guts daze 17 sai (今日から俺は！！ガッツだぜ17才) – April 11, 1997
- Kyō Kara Ore Wa!! Arashi wo yobu 17 sai (今日から俺は！！嵐を呼ぶ17才) – May 9, 1997

==== 1994 live-action film ====
A live-action film, featuring the same cast and staff from the V-Cinema live-action series, was released on February 19, 1994.

=== Drama ===
The manga was adapted into a Japanese television drama in 2018, starring Kento Kaku as Takashi Mitsuhashi, Kentarō as Shinji Itō, Nana Seino as Riko Akasaka, and Kanna Hashimoto as Kyōko Hayakawa, as the main protagonists, and including Yuu Shirota, Tomoya Nakamura, Kenta Suga, Katsuya, Junki Tozuka, and others as antagonists. Nippon TV's series official page reported a number of official guests, including Hirofumi Arai, Nobue Iketani, Shun Oguri, Haruka Shimazaki, Katsumi Takahashi, Shinichi Tsutsumi, Jun Hashimoto, Minami Hamabe, Yūya Yagira, Kento Yamazaki, Takayuki Yamada and Ayumu Yokoyama. Nippon TV translated the TV series title into English as From Today, It's My Turn!!. The series was broadcast for ten episodes on Nippon TV from October 14 to December 16, 2018.

==== 2020 live-action film ====
A live-action film, featuring the cast from the television drama, was announced in April 2019, with Yuichi Fukuda returning as director. The film, distributed by Toho, premiered on July 17, 2020.

== Reception ==
By March 2018, the manga had over 40 million copies in circulation.
