= Hiiragi-sama wa Jibun o Sagashiteiru =

Japanese manga series by Hiroyuki Nishimori

- First volume cover, featuring Hiiragi

柊様は自分を探している。
- Genre: Comedy, slice of life
- Manga
- Written by: Hiroyuki Nishimori
- Published by: Shogakukan
- Imprint: Shōnen Sunday Comics
- Magazine: Weekly Shōnen Sunday
- Original run: 3 February 2016 – 27 December 2017
- Volumes: 8
- icon

Hiiragi-sama wa Jibun o Sagashiteiru (柊様は自分を探している。; "Miss Hiiragi is Looking for Self") is a Japanese manga series written and illustrated by Hiroyuki Nishimori. It was serialized in Shogakukan's Weekly Shōnen Sunday from February 2016 to December 2017, with its chapters collected in eight tankōbon volumes.

== Publication ==
Hiiragi-sama wa Jibun o Sagashiteiru, written and illustrated by Hiroyuki Nishimori, was serialized in Shogakukan's shōnen manga magazine Weekly Shōnen Sunday from 3 February 2016 to 27 December 2017. An additional chapter was published in the magazine on 14 February 2018. Shogakukan collected its chapters in eight tankōbon volumes, released from 12 July 2016 to 16 March 2018.

=== Volumes ===
No.	Japanese release date	Japanese ISBN
1	12 July 2016	978-4-09-127180-8
2	18 October 2016	978-4-09-127405-2
3	17 February 2017	978-4-09-127501-1
4	18 May 2017	978-4-09-127570-7
5	18 August 2017	978-4-09-127679-7
6	17 November 2017	978-4-09-127870-8
7	16 February 2018	978-4-09-128097-8
8	16 March 2018	978-4-09-128185-2

== Reception ==
The Hiiragi-sama wa Jibun o Sagashiteiru volumes were featured on Oricon's weekly chart of the best-selling manga; volume 1 debuted 27th (23,563 copies sold); volume 2 debuted 36th (25,981 copies sold); volume 3 debuted 44th (14,444 copies sold); volume 4 debuted 36th (15,055 copies sold).
