= Ocha Nigosu =

Japanese manga series

- First tankōbon volume cover, featuring Masaya Funabashi

お茶にごす。
- Genre: Comedy, yankī
- Manga
- Written by: Hiroyuki Nishimori
- Published by: Shogakukan
- Imprint: Shōnen Sunday Comics
- Magazine: Weekly Shōnen Sunday
- Original run: April 4, 2007 – July 29, 2009
- Volumes: 11
- Television drama
- Directed by: Takeshi Furusawa; Kōji Takashi
- Written by: Takuya Katō; Shūji Yuki
- Music by: Yusuke Hayashi
- Original network: TXN (TV Aichi, TV Osaka, TV Tokyo)
- Original run: October 8, 2021 – December 24, 2021
- Episodes: 12
- icon

Ocha Nigosu (お茶にごす。), also known as A Bad Boy Drinks Tea!, is a Japanese manga series written and illustrated by Hiroyuki Nishimori. It was serialized in Shogakukan's Weekly Shōnen Sunday from April 2007 to July 2009, with its chapters collected in 11 tankōbon volumes. A 12-episode television drama adaptation premiered in Japan on Amazon Prime Video in March 2021 and was broadcast on TV Tokyo from October to December of the same year.

== Plot ==
The story follows the high school delinquent Masaya Funabashi, better known as "Devil Ma-kun", who is trying to reform his image by joining the Japanese tea ceremony club.

== Characters ==
Masaya Funabashi (船橋 雅矢, Funabashi Masaya)
Portrayed by: Nobuyuki Suzuki
Now a freshman in high school, "Devil Ma-kun" is hoping to reform his image after being labeled a delinquent in junior high due to his tough appearance, which caused him to get into a lot of fights. His explanation is that after winning one fight the losers comerades challenged him as well, and after their losses more and more people started challenging him to fights. While hoping to discard his bad image he tries to join a club, and chooses the tea club as it is the only one whose representatives are not to afraid to ask him.
Wataru Yamada (山田 航, Yamada Wataru)
Portrayed by: Toshiki Seto
Masaya's partner in crime. They have known one another since elementary school, and Wataru also has a reputation for being a troublemaker.
Naomi Anesaki (姉崎 奈緒美, Anesaki Naomi)
Portrayed by: Rinka Kumada
The head of the tea ceremony club, she is very open-minded and was quick to embrace Masaya's desire to reform his image.
Kaho Asakawa (浅川 夏帆, Asakawa Kaho)
Portrayed by: Minori Hagiwara
Chika Iikura
Portrayed by: Seira Nagashima
Tamami Shindaiji
Portrayed by: Karin Nishina
Tamiko Okunuma
Portrayed by: Yuzuki Hirakawa
Kōki Kashizawa
Portrayed by: Naohiro Yamamoto
Kitanuma
Portrayed by: Shogo Hama
Hiroshi Tatejima
Portrayed by: Tooru Nomaguchi

== Media ==
=== Manga ===
Ocha Nigosu, written and illustrated by Hiroyuki Nishimori, was serialized in Shogakukan's shōnen manga magazine Weekly Shōnen Sunday from April 4, 2007, to July 29, 2009. Shogakukan collected its chapters in 11 tankōbon volumes, released from August 10, 2007, to October 16, 2009.

==== Volumes ====
No.	Japanese release date	Japanese ISBN
1	August 10, 2007	978-4-09-121168-2
2	November 16, 2011	978-4-09-121216-0
3	February 18, 2008	978-4-09-121290-0
4	May 16, 2008	978-4-09-121387-7
5	August 11, 2008	978-4-09-121448-5
6	November 18, 2008	978-4-09-121506-2
7	February 18, 2009	978-4-09-121593-2
8	April 17, 2009	978-4-09-121898-8
9	July 17, 2009	978-4-09-121700-4
10	September 17, 2009	978-4-09-121786-8
11	October 16, 2009	978-4-09-122046-2

=== Drama ===
In December 2020, it was announced that a 12-episode Japanese television drama adaptation would premiere on TV Tokyo in 2021, starring Nobuyuki Suzuki as Masaya Funabashi. The 12 episodes first premiered on Amazon Prime Video on March 3, 2021. It was broadcast on TV Tokyo from October 8 to December 24, 2021.

== Reception ==
Most of the Ocha Nigosu volumes were featured on Oricon's weekly chart of the best-selling manga; volume 5 debuted 11th; volume 6 debuted 11th (68,773 copies sold); volume 7 debuted 14th (63,036 copies sold); volume 8 debuted 11th (48,435 copies sold); volume 9 debuted 14th (45,212 copies sold); volume 10 debuted 18th (54,372 copies sold); volume 11 debuted 17th (46,017 copies sold);
