= Mii-chan Wants to Be Kept =

Japanese manga series

- First tankōbon volume cover, featuring Mii-chan

みーちゃんは飼われたい (Mii-chan wa Kawaretai)
- Genre: Romantic comedy; Supernatural
- Manga
- Written by: Waka Takase
- Published by: Shueisha
- English publisher: NA: Seven Seas Entertainment
- Magazine: Ultra Jump
- Original run: March 17, 2023 – May 19, 2025
- Volumes: 4
- icon

Mii-chan Wants to Be Kept (Japanese: みーちゃんは飼われたい, Hepburn: Mii-chan wa Kawaretai) is a Japanese manga series written and illustrated by Waka Takase. It was serialized in Shueisha's seinen manga magazine Ultra Jump from March 2023 to May 2025.

== Plot ==
Iori, a young man overwhelmed by work stress and grief after the loss of his beloved pet cat, suffers from insomnia and a loss of appetite. One night, he takes in a stray black cat that appears at his doorstep. The following morning, he discovers that the cat has transformed into a naked young woman, who insists on living with him. She introduces herself as Mii-chan, a playful and enigmatic figure who claims to be the same cat he sheltered. As they live together, Mii-chan's unpredictable behavior and mysterious nature disrupt Iori's routine, while her presence gradually helps him overcome his emotional struggles. Meanwhile, clues about her true identity begin to surface.

== Publication ==
Written and illustrated by Waka Takase, Mii-chan Wants to Be Kept was serialized in Shueisha's seinen manga magazine Ultra Jump from March 17, 2023, to May 19, 2025. Shueisha collected its chapters in four individual tankōbon volumes, released from September 19, 2023, to July 17, 2025.

The series is licensed for English release in North America by Seven Seas Entertainment.

=== Volumes ===
| No. | Original release date | Original ISBN | English release date | English ISBN |
|---|---|---|---|---|
| 1 | September 19, 2023 | 978-4-08-892867-8 | April 15, 2025 | 979-8-89373-159-0 |
1. "I'll Let You Keep Me" (飼わせてあげる, Kawa Sete Ageru); 2. "I Can't Refuse Her" (逆らえない, Sakaraenai); 3. "Iori's the One I Want" (いおりがいいの, Iori Gaī no); 4. かわいい 猫 美少女 (Kawaī Neko Bishōjo); 5. "Say It Again..." (もっかい言って, Mokkai Itte); 6. "You Love Me, Too..." (大好きじゃん, Daisukijan)
| 2 | March 18, 2024 | 978-4-08-893190-6 | August 5, 2025 | 979-8-89373-680-9 |
7. "Cat Heaven" (ねこ天国, Neko Tengoku); 8. "It's My Job to Look After You" (うちの子だから, Uchi no Kodakara); 9. "He's Still Not Home" (帰ってこない, Kaette Konai); 10. "It's Not So Simple" (簡単じゃない, Kantan Janai); 11. "Being Together Makes Me Happy" (一緒がうれしい, Issho ga Ureshī); 12. "Shiftless Loser" (甲斐性なしの底辺男, Kaishō Nashi no Teihen Otoko)
| 3 | November 19, 2024 | 978-4-08-893415-0 | December 9, 2025 | 979-8-89561-215-6 |
13. "Let's Go Home." (一緒に帰ろ, Issho ni Kaero); 14. "Cat or Human?" (猫か、人間か, Neko ka, Ningen ka); 15. "Glad You Figured It Out." (わかればよし, Wakareba Yoshi); 16. "Mii-chan and the Zoo" (みーちゃんと動物園, Mii-chan to Dōbutsuen); 17. "Fun Stuff" (楽しいこと, Tanoshī Koto); 18. "Summer Pursuits" (夏満喫, Natsu Mankitsu); 19. "Can't Be Alone" (ひとりじゃもう, Hitori ja Mō); Bonus Pages
| 4 | July 17, 2025 | 978-4-08-893665-9 | April 28, 2026 | 979-8-89765-346-1 |
20. Aijan (愛じゃん); 21. Orei ga Shitai (お礼がしたい); 22. Sōiu Toko (そういうとこ); 23. Urayamashī (羨ましい); 24. Issho ni Itai (一緒にいたい); 25. Un, Kawaī (うん、かわいい); Final Chapter: Unmei nanka Janai (運命なんかじゃない); Bonus Pages

== See also ==
- Matsurika Kanriden, a light novel series with a manga adaptation illustrated by Waka Takase
