= By the Grace of the Gods =

Japanese light novel series and its adaptations

- First light novel cover, featuring (from left to right) Ryoma Takebayashi, Reinhart Jamil, and Eliaria Jamil

神達に拾われた男 (Kami-tachi ni Hirowareta Otoko)
- Genre: Adventure, isekai, slice of life
- Novel series
- Written by: Roy
- Published by: Shōsetsuka ni Narō
- Original run: January 28, 2014 – present
- Light novel
- Written by: Roy
- Illustrated by: Ririnra
- Published by: Hobby Japan
- English publisher: NA: J-Novel Club
- Imprint: HJ Novels
- Original run: September 22, 2017 – present
- Volumes: 19
- Manga
- Written by: Roy
- Illustrated by: Ranran
- Published by: Square Enix
- English publisher: NA: Square Enix
- Magazine: Manga UP!
- Original run: November 29, 2017 – present
- Volumes: 16
- Anime television series
- Directed by: Takeyuki Yanase
- Written by: Kazuyuki Fudeyasu (S1); Yuka Yamada (S2)
- Music by: Hiroaki Tsutsumi
- Studio: Maho Film
- Licensed by: Crunchyroll (Note: In North America through Crunchyroll, LLC (formerly known as Funimation).); SA/SEA: Medialink
- Original network: Tokyo MX, BS Fuji
- English network: SEA: Animax Asia
- Original run: October 4, 2020 – March 27, 2023
- Episodes: 24
- icon

By the Grace of the Gods (Japanese: 神達に拾われた男, Hepburn: Kami-tachi ni Hirowareta Otoko; 'The Man Picked Up by the Gods') is a Japanese light novel series written by Roy and illustrated by Ririnra. It is about a man who is chosen by three gods to be reincarnated into a fantasy world after living a sad life, using his past knowledge combined with new powers bestowed upon him by the gods to help others and live a bountiful life. It began serialization online in January 2014 on the user-generated novel publishing website Shōsetsuka ni Narō, with a revised version began serialization since September 2015.

The series was later acquired by Hobby Japan, which has published nineteen volumes since September 2017 under its HJ Novels imprint. A manga adaptation with art by Ranran has been serialized online via Square Enix's Manga UP! website since November 2017 and has been collected in sixteen tankōbon volumes. The light novel is licensed in North America by J-Novel Club, while the manga is licensed by Square Enix. An anime television series adaptation by Maho Film aired from October to December 2020. A second season aired from January to March 2023.

== Plot ==
The life of Ryoma Takebayashi could only be described as nonstop ride of horrible luck and abuse; which would have driven most people insane from all the painful experiences. However, despite all that, Ryoma remained a kind man until the day he died from hitting his head from sneezing in his sleep. Three gods from another world take pity on Ryoma, offering the chance to live a new life in their world; granting him jack of all trades magic and a new childhood body for his soul.

With a strong moral compass and newfound confidence in the ability to truly live his life freely, Ryoma spends his life exploring and learning about his new home world.

== Characters ==
=== Main characters ===
Ryoma Takebayashi (竹林竜馬, Takebayashi Ryoma)
Voiced by: Azusa Tadokoro (child), Hiroki Yasumoto (adult) (Japanese); Emily Neves (child), Chris Rager (adult) (English)
Ryoma lived an uneventful life as an office worker/salaryman in Japan before dying in his sleep. Due to his diligent and kind behavior, Ryoma earns the grace of three gods from Seilfall who bring him to their world as an 8-year-old boy where he lives in a forest for three years while polishing his skills and taming hundreds of slimes, making use of their multiple abilities in various tasks from combat and hunting to cleaning and crafting, until meeting the Jamil family who warmly welcomes him among them. Determined to live independently, he refuses to overindulge on their hospitality and looks for ways to make ends meet by himself. It was later revealed that Ryoma's harsh life on Earth was caused by the God of Earth who intended to torment him enough for him to turn into a murderer, just for his amusement. Seeing that he failed to break Ryoma's mind, the god gave up on him and provoked his death instead.
Eliaria Jamil (エリアリア・ジャミール, Eriaria Jamīru)
Voiced by: Yūki Kuwahara (Japanese); Suzie Yeung (English)
Heir to the Jamil dukedom, Eliaria is an 11-year-old girl who becomes Ryoma's closest friend. Like Ryoma, she is a monster tamer and her body is gifted with large magic potential, but she has difficulty controlling it until Ryoma teaches her how to train herself properly. After Ryoma decides to stay in Gimul, she frequently exchanges letters with him. Eliaria later moves to the Imperial Academy at the capital for her studies and makes some new friends.

=== Jamil Household ===
Reinhart Jamil (ラインハルト・ジャミール, Rainharuto Jamīru)
Voiced by: Daisuke Ono (Japanese); Anthony Bowling (English)
The Duke of Jamil and Eliaria's father, he meets Ryoma in the forest and becomes his friend, later inviting him to live with his family.
Elise Jamil (エリーゼ・ジャミール, Erīze Jamīru)
Voiced by: Saori Hayami (Japanese); Caitlin Glass (English)
Duchess of Jamil and Reinhart's wife. Upon meeting Ryoma, she quickly grows attached to him, treating the boy like her own son.
Reinbach Jamil (ラインバッハ・ジャミール, Rainbahha Jamīru)
Voiced by: Takehito Koyasu (Japanese); Kent Williams (English)
The former Duke of Jamil, he is Reinhart's father and a well known monster tamer. He also is one of Ryoma's closest confidants to whom he entrusts the secret that he is a Child of God.
Hughes (ヒューズ, Hyūzu)
Voiced by: Keisuke Koumoto (Japanese); Jeremy Inman (English)
One of the Jamil family's bodyguards, he gets injured while fighting a bear and rescued by Ryoma, leading his first encounter with Reinhart. He later becomes Lulunese's husband.
Lulunese (ルルネーゼ, Rurunēze)
A female cat beastkin who is a maid of the Jamil Household. She later becomes Hughes' wife.

=== Deities ===
Lulutia (ルルティア, Rurutia)
Voiced by: Kikuko Inoue (Japanese); Marissa Lenti (English)
The goddess of healing and love with the appearance of beautiful young woman. When she visited Earth, she spent her time eating whatever she wanted.
Kufo (クフォ)
Voiced by: Makoto Koichi (Japanese); Ciarán Strange (English)
The god of life with the appearance of a young boy. When he visited Earth, he spent his time traveling all over the world, even the depths of Atlantis and Sahara Desert.
Gain (ガイン)
Voiced by: Motomu Kiyokawa (Japanese); R. Bruce Elliott (English)
The god of creation with the appearance of an elderly man. When he visited Earth, he spent his time listening to idol groups.
Tekun (テクン)
Voiced by: Nobuyuki Hiyama (Japanese); Patrick McAlister (English)
The god of wine and craftsmanship with the appearance of a plump adult man. He takes in interest on Ryoma after witnessing his stone sculptures and also becomes his friend.
Fernobelia (フェルノベリア, Ferunoberia)
Voiced by: Takuya Eguchi
The god of magic and academics with the appearance of a young bespectacled man who asks Ryoma some questions to confirm that he is not at risk of misusing his powers. He tends to speak impersonal sentences, lacking much emotion.
Serelipta (セーレリプタ, Sēreriputa)
The god of fishing and ports with the appearance of an androgynous young boy. He takes an interest on Ryoma due to his ability to withstand the gods' powers to some extent and upon investigating his mind, discovers the truth about his harsh life and early death.

=== Bamboo Forest Laundry Shop ===
Carla Norad (カルラ・ノーラッド, Karura Nōraddo)
Voiced by: Risa Kubota (Japanese); Dani Chambers (English)
A member of the Trading Guild who becomes a manager of Bamboo Forest under Ryoma's. She later moves to Lenaf to manage the laundry's second shop.
Callum Norad (カルム・ノーラッド, Karumu Nōraddo)
Voiced by: Sakura Nakamura (Japanese); Lee George (English)
Carla's twin brother who was also lent by the Trading Guild to be a manager of Ryoma's shop. He often speaks up whenever Ryoma is pushing himself too far and needs rest.
Dorche (ドルチェ)
Voiced by: Junya Enoki (Japanese); Aaron Michael (English)
A bodyguard hired by Ryoma to protect his Gimul shop; due to ignorant Tamers being jealous of a business successfully run with slimes. He is typically stoic and doesn't speak.
Tony (トニー, Tonī), Lobelia (ロベリア, Roberia) and Caulkin (コーキン, Kōkin)
Voiced by: Hiro Shimono (Tony), Manami Numakura (Lobelia), and Akira Ishida (Caulkin)
Three slime researchers who were fired from the academy and become employees at the Lenaf shop. They are grateful to Ryoma for teaching them how slimes evolve, though they tend to call him in to handle the slime contracts when the slimes multiply too fast.
Selma (シェルマ, Sheruma)
Voiced by: Kanako Yanagihara (Japanese); Michelle Rojas (English)
Bamboo forest's cook at the Gimul shop. She was hired at the same time alongside Fina, Jane and Maria.
Fina (フィーナ, Fīna), Jane (ジェーン, Jēn) and Maria (マリア)
Voiced by: Shizuku Hoshinoya (Fina), Fairouz Ai (Jane), Yui Otagiri (Maria) (Japanese); Felecia Angelle (Fina), Brittney Karbowski (Jane), Jeannie Tirado (Maria) (English)
All three left their home village together in search of work before being hired by Ryoma at Bamboo Forest. They were surprised not only that Ryoma was a child who owned the business, but that he treated all employees equal regardless if they were local or not. More than anything, they highly appreciate him from providing a comfortable work environment and free lodging.
Fei (フェイ, Faye) and Li Ling (リーリン, Rīrin)
Voiced by: Tsuyoshi Aoki (Fei) and Hisako Tōjō (Li Ling) (Japanese); Oscar Seung (Fei) and Emi Lo (Li Ling) (English)
Former assassins employed by Ryoma at Bamboo Forest within a day of the shop opening, due to the overwhelming clientele. Ryoma pays them extra for bodyguard duty. Despite their past, they are quite affable and enjoy their new life. Ryoma often consults them over how to better protect the shop whenever a new issue arise. They fled their old country due to political drama.

=== Adventurer's Guild ===
Miya (ミーヤ)
Voiced by: Marika Kōno (Japanese); Monica Rial (English)
A female cat beastkin and rank B adventurer, she becomes Ryoma's first client after he becomes an adventurer when he is tasked to clean her house, later becoming his friend.
Worgan (ウォーガン, Uōgan)
Voiced by: Tetsu Inada (Japanese); Christopher Guerrero (English)
The master of the Adventurer's Guild's Gimul branch. He has an embarrassing past event involving being filthy, which he wants kept quiet.
Welanna (ウェルアンナ, Ueruan'na)
Voiced by: Yuuki Hirose (Japanese); Lauren Landa (English)
A female wolf beastman and Miya's friend.
Mizelia (ミゼリア, Mizeria)
Voiced by: Yūki Takada (Japanese); Amber Lee Connors (English)
A female tiger beastman and Miya's friend.
Cilia (シリア, Shiria)
Voiced by: Yui Fukuo (Japanese); Risa Mei (English)
A female rabbit beastman and Miya's friend.
Maylene (メイリーン, Meirīn) and Paena (パエナ)
Voiced by: Yū Wakui (Maylene), Kanon Takao (Paena) (Japanese); Anastasia Muñoz (Meylene) and Jalitza Delgado (Paena) (English)
The receptionists at the Adventurer's Guild's Gimul branch.

=== Merchants Guild ===
Glissela (グリシエーラ, Gurishiēra)
Voiced by: Reiko Suzuki (Japanese); Wendy Powell (English)
Guild master at the Merchants Guild.

=== Others ===
Tabuchi Kazuo (田淵)
Voiced by: Makoto Furukawa (Japanese); Derick Snow (English)
Ryoma's co-worker during his previous life. Ryoma named the first slime he tamed in his honor, but the slime dies, leaving only its core.
Miyabi Saionji (ミヤビ・サイオンジ)
Voiced by: Yuiko Tatsumi (Japanese); Kristi Rothrock (English)
A young female fox beastkin and Pioro Saionji's daughter, she trains to be a merchant like her father and befriends Ryoma during his stay in the city of Lenaf. She later moves to the capital to study at the Imperial Academy, becoming one of Eliaria's close friends.
Pioro Saionji (ピオロ・サイオンジ)
Voiced by: Kenichi Suzumura (Japanese); Shawn Gann (English)
Miyabi's father who is a merchant and a descendant of a Child of God, having maintained within his family many aspects and traditions of his ancestor, including his surname.
Serge Morgan (セルジュ・モーガン, Seruju Mōgan)
Voiced by: Makoto Yasumura (Japanese); Charlie Campbell (English)
A merchant who is friends with the Jamil Family and President of the Morgan Trading Company who helps Ryoma open his laundry shop, later becoming his business partner in other enterprises.
Prenance (プレナンス, Purenansu)
Voiced by: Daisuke Hirakawa
The leader of the Semroid Troupe.
Michelle Wildan (ミシェル・ウィルダン, Misheru Uirudan), Riela Clifford (リエラ・クリフォード, Riera Kurifōdo) and Kanan Schuzer (カナン・シューザー, Kanan Shūzā)
Voiced by: Natsumi Fujiwara (Michelle), Minami Takahashi (Riela), and Atsumi Tanezaki (Kanan) (Japanese); Morgan Berry (Michelle), Sarah Wiedenheft (Kanan) (English)
Three female students of the Imperial Academy from different upbringings who befriend Miyabi and Eliaria and become part of their study group. Unlike most groups who are solely commoners or nobles, their group is a mix because they respect each other and do not care about social status, which the academy teachers are proud of.

== Media ==
=== Light novels ===
The series was first published online on the Shōsetsuka ni Narō website in January 2014 by Roy. A revised version of the series was then launched in September 2015. It was later acquired by Hobby Japan, who published the first volume as a light novel under their HJ Novels imprint in September 2017. The series is licensed in North America by J-Novel Club.

==== Volumes ====
No.	Original release date	Original ISBN	English release date	English ISBN
1	September 22, 2017	978-4-7986-1509-7	February 1, 2020 (digital); November 3, 2020 (print)	978-1-7183-6898-9 (digital); 978-1-7183-5380-0 (print)
2	November 22, 2017	978-4-7986-1571-4	April 18, 2020 (digital); February 2, 2021 (print)	978-1-7183-6900-9 (digital); 978-1-7183-5381-7 (print)
3	March 22, 2018	978-4-7986-1653-7	May 31, 2020 (digital); April 6, 2021 (print)	978-1-7183-6902-3 (digital); 978-1-7183-5382-4 (print)
4	July 21, 2018	978-4-7986-1730-5	August 30, 2020 (digital); June 1, 2021 (print)	978-1-7183-6904-7 (digital); 978-1-7183-5383-1 (print)
5	November 22, 2018	978-4-7986-1807-4	November 22, 2020 (digital); August 17, 2021 (print)	978-1-7183-6906-1 (digital); 978-1-7183-5384-8 (print)
6	March 22, 2019	978-4-7986-1887-6	February 15, 2021 (digital); October 26, 2021 (print)	978-1-7183-6908-5 (digital); 978-1-7183-5385-5 (print)
7	August 24, 2019	978-4-7986-1980-4	May 25, 2021 (digital); February 15, 2022 (print)	978-1-7183-6910-8 (digital); 978-1-7183-5386-2 (print)
8	February 22, 2020	978-4-7986-2124-1	August 24, 2021 (digital); April 19, 2022 (print)	978-1-7183-6912-2 (digital); 978-1-7183-5387-9 (print)
9	August 22, 2020	978-4-7986-2270-5	November 9, 2021 (digital); June 7, 2022 (print)	978-1-7183-6914-6 (digital); 978-1-7183-5388-6 (print)
10	December 22, 2020	978-4-7986-2375-7	January 24, 2022 (digital); October 4, 2022 (print)	978-1-7183-6916-0 (digital); 978-1-7183-5389-3 (print)
11	December 18, 2021	978-4-7986-2667-3	August 1, 2022 (digital); December 13, 2022 (print)	978-1-7183-6918-4 (digital); 978-1-7183-5390-9 (print)
12	November 18, 2022	978-4-7986-2973-5	June 19, 2023 (digital); March 12, 2024 (print)	978-1-7183-5391-6 (digital); 978-1-7183-5391-6 (print)
13	April 19, 2023	978-4-7986-3162-2	October 12, 2023 (digital); August 13, 2024 (print)	978-1-7183-6922-1 (digital); 978-1-7183-5392-3 (print)
14	November 17, 2023	978-4-7986-3343-5	May 17, 2024 (digital); April 15, 2025 (print)	978-1-7183-6924-5 (digital); 978-1-7183-5393-0 (print)
15	May 17, 2024	978-4-7986-3539-2	February 14, 2025 (digital); December 9, 2025 (print)	978-1-7183-6926-9 (digital); 978-1-7183-5394-7 (print)
16	December 19, 2024	978-4-7986-3698-6	June 27, 2025 (digital); April 14, 2026 (print)	978-1-7183-6928-3 (digital); 978-1-7183-5395-4 (print)
17	June 19, 2025	978-4-7986-3871-3	January 21, 2026 (digital); January 12, 2027 (print)	978-1-7183-6930-6 (digital); 978-1-7183-5396-1 (print)
18	March 19, 2026	978-4-7986-4125-6	September 23, 2026 (digital)	978-1-7183-6932-0
19	September 18, 2026	978-4-7986-4266-6	—	—

=== Manga ===
A manga adaptation of the series by Ranran began serialization in Square Enix's Manga UP! app and website on November 29, 2017. The manga is licensed in North America by Square Enix.

==== Volumes ====
No.	Original release date	Original ISBN	English release date	English ISBN
1	June 13, 2018	978-4-7575-5742-0	November 10, 2020	978-1-64609-080-8
1. "Reincarnated in a Parallel World" (異世界転生, Isekai Tensei); 2. "Cultural Exchange" (異文化交流, Ibunka Kōryū); 3. "Secrets of the Slime" (スライムの秘密, Suraimu no Himitsu); 4. "Setting Off" (旅立ち, Tabidachi); Original Story
2	October 22, 2018	978-4-7575-5881-6	May 11, 2021	978-1-64609-081-5
5. "First Town" (初めての街, Hajimete no Machi); 6. "Public Works" (土木工事, Doboku Kōji); 7. "In Gimul" (ギムルの街で, Gimuru no Machi de); 8. "Adventurers' Guild" (昌険者ギルド, Shō kensha Girudo); 9. "First Job" (初めての仕事, Hajimete no Shigoto); Original Story
3	April 12, 2019	978-4-7575-6041-3	September 21, 2021	978-1-64609-082-2
10. "Strategy Meeting" (作戦会議, Sakusen kaigi); 11. "Cleanup Work" (清掃作業, Seisō sagyō); 12. "Past and Future" (過去と未来, Kako to Mirai); 13. "Magic Training" (魔法の訓練, Mahō no Kunren); 14. "Monster Extermination" (魔獣討伐, Majū Tōbatsu); Original Story
4	October 12, 2019	978-4-7575-6343-8	January 11, 2022	978-1-64609-088-4
15. "Using Alchemy" (錬金術活用法, Renkinjutsu Katsuyō-hō); 16. "More Monster Exterminating" (再び魔獣討伐, Futatabi Majū Tōbatsu); 17. "The Morgan Trading Company" (モーガン商会, Mōgan Shōkai); 18. "The Great Monster Extermination" (大規模魔獣討伐, Daikibo Majū Tōbatsu); 19. "Break Time" (休憩時間, Kyūkei Jikan); 20. "Report" (報告, Hōkoku); Original Story
5	April 22, 2020	978-4-7575-6610-1	September 6, 2022	978-1-64609-089-1
21. "Meeting Again"; 22. "Goblin Extermination Mission"; 23. "The Battle Begins"; 24. "Treatment"; 25. "Going Home"; 26. "Advice About Starting a Business"; Original Story
6	December 22, 2020	978-4-7575-6981-2	November 15, 2022	978-1-64609-140-9
27. "Snap Decision"; 28. "Setting Up Shop 1"; 29. "Setting Up Shop 2"; 30. "The Reincarnated"; 31. "Meeting the Boss"; Original Story
7	June 7, 2021	978-4-7575-7286-7	February 28, 2023	978-1-64609-158-4
32. "Opening the Shop, Then Hiring"; 33. "Working at the Abandoned Mine"; 34. "Lucky Find"; 35. "Taming Magic"; 36. "Magic Slimes"; Original Story
8	February 7, 2022	978-4-7575-7725-1	May 9, 2023	978-1-64609-193-5
37. "The New Tamer"; 38. "To the Swamp"; 39. "A Challenging Contract"; 40. "Day of Parting"; Original Story
9	September 7, 2022	978-4-7575-8116-6	August 8, 2023	978-1-64609-221-5
41. "Development of the Gods"; 42. "Emergency Situation"; 43. "Poison and Medicine"; 44. "Communication After Work"; Original Story
10	March 7, 2023	978-4-7575-8444-0	April 2, 2024	978-1-64609-258-1
11	October 6, 2023	978-4-7575-8834-9	November 12, 2024	978-1-64609-309-0
12	March 7, 2024	978-4-7575-9079-3	April 1, 2025	978-1-64609-352-6
13	October 7, 2024	978-4-7575-9455-5	November 4, 2025	978-1-64609-427-1
14	March 7, 2025	978-4-7575-9721-1	June 16, 2026	978-1-64609-457-8
15	October 7, 2025	978-4-301-00091-4	December 15, 2026	979-8-89910-028-4
16	May 7, 2026	978-4-301-00501-8	—	—

=== Anime ===
An anime adaptation of the series was announced by Hobby Japan on February 20, 2020, which was later confirmed to be a television series on April 17, 2020. The series was animated by Maho Film and directed by Takeyuki Yanase, with Kazuyuki Fudeyasu as story editor and screenwriter, Kaho Deguchi as character designer with Ririnra credited with the original designs, and Hiroaki Tsutsumi composing the music. While the first episode had an advanced premiere screening at FunimationCon 2020 on July 3, 2020, the series officially ran for 12 episodes in Japan from October 4 to December 20, 2020, on Tokyo MX and BS Fuji. Azusa Tadokoro performed the opening theme "Yasashii Sekai", while MindaRyn performed the ending theme "Blue Rose knows".

The series was licensed outside of Asia by Funimation. On October 31, 2020, Funimation announced that the series would receive an English dub, which premiered the following day. Following Sony's acquisition of Crunchyroll, the series was moved to Crunchyroll. Medialink licensed the series in South and Southeast Asia and streamed it on their Ani-One YouTube channel.

On June 4, 2021, a second season was announced. Yuka Yamada replaced Kazuyuki Fudeyasu as the scriptwriter. It aired from January 9 to March 27, 2023. (Note: Tokyo MX listed the season premiere at 24:00 on January 8, 2023, which is at midnight on January 9.) MindaRyn performed the opening theme "Way to go", while Azusa Tadokoro performed the ending theme "Drum-shiki Tansaki".

== See also ==
- Even Dogs Go to Other Worlds, another light novel series with the same illustrator
- Multi-Mind Mayhem, another light novel series with the same illustrator
