= Takeshi Mori (director) =

Japanese anime director

Takeshi Mori (もりたけし, Mori Takeshi; born October 10, 1963 in Tokyo, Japan.) is a Japanese anime director, storyboard artist, and scriptwriter. After graduating from Waseda University, Mori began working in the anime industry.

He began working in 1986 at Ajia-do Animation Works as an in-between animation artist before moving on to key animation work. From there, he worked as a storyboard artist and producer for the NTV/Studio Pierrot TV series The Burning Wild Man. After being impressed by the OVA series Gunbuster, he began working for Gainax. After working as a storyboard artist on Nadia: The Secret of Blue Water, Mori directed the series Tasuke, the Samurai Cop. More recent series he has directed include Vandread, Ruin Explorers Fam & Ihrlie, Meltylancer, and Stratos 4.

Throughout his career, he has used the pen names Shin Nemoto (根本 清, Nemoto Shin), Inumakura (いぬまくら), and Urano Kantoku (浦野 寛徳) (the last meaning "behind the scenes director"). He is the son of former Chunichi Dragons #4 batter Tōru Mori (森 徹, Mori Tōru).

== Works ==
- Kimagure Orange Road (1987–1988, production)
- Ranma ½ (1989–1992, storyboards, production)
- Edokko Boy Gatten Tasuke (1990–1991, director, storyboards, production, title animation)
- Otaku no Video (1991, director)
- Giant Robo (1992 (ep.1), 1995 (ep.6), director, storyboards)
- Kyō Kara Ore Wa!! (1993–1996, director)
- The Irresponsible Captain Tylor (1993, storyboards, production)
- Lunar: Eternal Blue (1994, Sega CD, storyboards)
- Ruin Explorers (1995–1996, director, script, storyboards)
- Gunsmith Cats (1995–1996; director, Storyboard)
- Rurouni Kenshin (1996–1998, storyboards, credited as Moritake)
- Super Radical Gag Family (1998, storyboards)
- Vandread (2000–2001, director)
- Saikano (2002, storyboards)
- Stratos 4 (2003–2006, director)
- Ōban Star-Racers (2004, storyboards)
- Fighting Fairy Girl Rescue Me Mave-chan (2005, director, script)
- Eureka Seven (2005–2006, storyboards)
- Kirameki Project (2005–2006, supervisor)
- Noein (2005–2006, storyboards)
- Majime ni Fumajime Kaiketsu Zorori (2005–2007, series organization, script, storyboards)
- Darker than Black (2007, storyboards)
- Kishin Taisen Gigantic Formula (2007, storyboards)
- Sketchbook (2007, storyboards)
- Skull Man (2007, director)
- Bamboo Blade (2007–2008, storyboards)
- You're Under Arrest (2007–2008, storyboards)
- Rosario + Vampire (2008, storyboards)
- The Tower of Druaga: The Aegis of Uruk (2008, storyboards)
- Birdy the Mighty (2008–2009, storyboards)
- The Tower of Druaga: The Sword of Uruk (2009, storyboards)
- Rideback (2009, storyboards)
- Shangri-La (2009, creative producer)
- Towa no Quon (2010–2011, assistant director, collaborative director)
- My Daughter Left the Nest and Returned an S-Rank Adventurer (2023, chief director)
- Matsurika Kanriden (2027, chief director)
