= Music of Summer Pockets =

Summer Pockets and Summer Pockets Reflection Blue discography
- Studio albums: 2
- Soundtrack albums: 2
- Singles: 3
- Remixes: 6

Summer Pockets and Summer Pockets Reflection Blue are visual novels developed by Key and published by Visual Arts in 2018 and 2020. The story is set on a fictional island on the Seto Inland Sea and follows the life of Hairi Takahara, a young man who uses the recent death of his grandmother as an excuse to escape to the island after an unpleasant incident. Once there, he gets to know the townsfolk of Torishirojima and multiple girls who are the focus of the story. The discography of Summer Pockets and Reflection Blue consists of two studio albums, three singles, two soundtracks, and six remix albums.

The core of the discography consists of two original soundtrack albums for the visual novels, one for Summer Pockets and the other for Reflection Blue. The soundtracks were produced by Key Sounds Label and released in 2018 and 2020. The music on the soundtracks was mainly composed and arranged by Jun Maeda, Shinji Orito, Donmaru, Tomohiro Takeshita and Ryō Mizutsuki. Two image song albums were released in 2018 and 2020. Six remix albums were released for the two games between 2018 and 2020. Three singles were released between 2018 and 2020 consisting of theme song singles for the visual novels.

== Albums ==
=== Swallow Tale ===
Swallow Tale is a remix album which contains a selection of songs from the visual novel Summer Pockets, remixed by Shōji Morifuji and Yūichiro Tsukagoshi. The album is otherwise composed and produced by Jun Maeda, Shinji Orito, Tomohiro Takeshita, and Ryō Mizutsuki. This album was released as a bonus item, included with the limited-edition version of Summer Pockets for Windows released on June 29, 2018, and it bears the catalog number KSLA-0148 by Key Sounds Label. As a result, it was not released for individual sale. The album contains one disc with eight remixed music tracks from the visual novel. Emiri Iwai sings "Tsumugi no Natsuyasumi - Sunset Lighthouse Version -", and Konomi Suzuki sings "Alkatale - Acid Blue Remix -".

Track listing
No.	Title	Music	Arrangement	Length
1.	"Sea, You & Me - Fiesta Version -"	Jun Maeda	Shōji Morifuji	3:54
2.	"Other side Blue - Deep Blue Version -"	Shinji Orito	Yūichiro Tsukagoshi	3:26
3.	"Golden Hours - Harvest Version -"	Tomohiro Takeshita	Yūichiro Tsukagoshi	3:12
4.	"White with You - Piano Duet -"	Ryō Mizutsuki	Shōji Morifuji	3:59
5.	"Kano Kioku, Ano Kioku - Blind Spot Version -" (かの記憶、あの記憶 That Memory, This Memory)	Shinji Orito	Shōji Morifuji	4:30
6.	"Tsumugi no Natsuyasumi - Sunset Lighthouse Version -" (紬の夏休み Tsumugi's Summer Vacation) (Lyrics by Hasama; Performed by Emiri Iwai)	Shinji Orito	Yūichiro Tsukagoshi	4:54
7.	"Adventure for Black - Wavelet Version -"	Shinji Orito	Shōji Morifuji	4:36
8.	"Alkatale - Acid Blue Remix -" (アルカテイル Arukateiru) (Lyrics by Kai; Performed by Konomi Suzuki)	Shinji Orito	Shōji Morifuji	4:31
Total length:				33:02

=== Summer Pockets Original Soundtrack ===
The Summer Pockets Original Soundtrack, from the visual novel Summer Pockets, was released on September 26, 2018, in Japan by Key Sounds Label bearing the catalog numbers KSLA-0149—0151 and KSLM-0149—0151. The soundtrack contains three discs totaling 48 music tracks composed, arranged, and produced by Jun Maeda, Shinji Orito, Donmaru, Tomohiro Takeshita, Ryō Mizutsuki, Kazuki Yanagawa, Bermei Inazawa, Shoyū, Masato Nakayama, and Yūichiro Tsukagoshi. Five artists provide vocals for six songs: Konomi Suzuki sings "Alkatale" and "Lasting Moment", Emiri Iwai sings "Tsumugi no Natsuyasumi", Yurika sings "Yasōka", Runa Mizutani sings "Hane no Yurikago", and Rionos sings "Pocket o Fukuramasete".

Disc 1
No.	Title	Music	Arrangement	Length
1.	"Alkatale (Game Size Ver)" (アルカテイル Arukateiru) (Lyrics by Kai; Performed by Konomi Suzuki)	Shinji Orito	Masato Nakayama	2:13
2.	"Summer Pockets"	Ryō Mizutsuki	Ryō Mizutsuki	4:00
3.	"Sea, You & Me"	Jun Maeda	Bermei Inazawa	5:10
4.	"Semigoe to Tomo ni" (蝉声とともに Alongside Chirping Cicadas)	Ryō Mizutsuki	Ryō Mizutsuki	4:40
5.	"Natsuyasumi no Sugoshikata" (夏休みの過ごし方 How to Spend the Summer Vacation)	Shinji Orito	Kazuki Yanagawa	3:02
6.	"Saka no Ue no Kagerō" (坂の上の陽炎 The Heat Haze Above the Hill)	Donmaru	Donmaru	3:13
7.	"White Loneliness"	Ryō Mizutsuki	Ryō Mizutsuki	2:49
8.	"Other side Blue"	Shinji Orito	Kazuki Yanagawa	3:34
9.	"Adventure for Black"	Shinji Orito	Kazuki Yanagawa	3:08
10.	"Golden Hours"	Tomohiro Takeshita	Tomohiro Takeshita	2:58
11.	"Shukudai wa 8-gatsu 32-nichi ni" (宿題は8月32日に Doing Homework on August 32)	Donmaru	Donmaru	3:54
12.	"Hizashi no Itoma" (日射しの暇 Sunshine Leisure)	Donmaru	Donmaru	3:45
13.	"Furikaeranakute mo Yatsu wa Iru" (振り返らなくてもヤツはいる There He is Even Without Turning Back)	Shinji Orito	Shoyū	4:00
14.	"Hitonatsu no Tawamure" (ひと夏のたわむれ Frolic Summer)	Donmaru	Donmaru	2:59
15.	"Summer Aventure" (さま～あばんちゅ～る Samā Abanchūru)	Donmaru	Donmaru	3:30
16.	"Natsu no Komoriuta" (夏の子守歌 Summer Lullaby)	Shinji Orito	Shinji Orito	3:47
17.	"Lasting Moment (Game Size Ver)" (Lyrics by Yū Niijima; Performed by Konomi Suzuki)	Donmaru	Donmaru	4:02

Disc 2
No.	Title	Music	Arrangement	Length
1.	"White with You"	Ryō Mizutsuki	Ryō Mizutsuki	4:11
2.	"Kokage no Ikoi" (木陰の憩 Breaktime Under the Tree)	Ryō Mizutsuki	Ryō Mizutsuki	1:58
3.	"Tenohira no Mukō no Taiyō" (手の平の向こうの太陽 The Sun On the Other Side of My Palm)	Donmaru	Donmaru	4:57
4.	"Ima dake wa Atsusa o Wasure" (今だけは暑さを忘れ Forget the Heat For Just This Moment)	Tomohiro Takeshita	Tomohiro Takeshita	3:41
5.	"Niji no Chō" (虹の蝶 Rainbow Butterflies)	Shinji Orito	Kazuki Yanagawa	3:28
6.	"Kage wa Irokokute" (影は色濃くて Dark Shadows)	Donmaru	Donmaru	3:43
7.	"Kano Kioku, Ano Kioku" (かの記憶、あの記憶 This Memory, That Memory)	Shinji Orito	Kazuki Yanagawa	3:43
8.	"Manazashi no Ushiro" (眼差しの後ろ Behind the Gaze)	Tomohiro Takeshita	Tomohiro Takeshita	2:48
9.	"Yomayoi" (夜迷い Lost at Night)	Shinji Orito	Shinji Orito	2:46
10.	"Deep Blue Blue"	Shinji Orito	Kazuki Yanagawa	7:01
11.	"Futari no Bōken" (二人の冒険 The Two's Adventure)	Donmaru	Donmaru	4:35
12.	"Higenekodan no Bōken" (髭猫団の冒険 The Catbeard Brigade's Adventure)	Donmaru	Donmaru	4:31
13.	"Wing of Glass"	Tomohiro Takeshita	Tomohiro Takeshita	4:18
14.	"Semishigure no Sukima ni..." (蝉時雨の隙間に... In the Gaps Between the Cicadas' Cries...)	Shinji Orito	Shinji Orito	2:54
15.	"Natsu o Kizanda, Nami no Oto wa..." (夏を刻んだ、波の音は... The Beating Waves That Chronicles the Summer...)	Tomohiro Takeshita	Tomohiro Takeshita	2:46
16.	"Tsumugi no Natsuyasumi" (紬の夏休み Tsumugi's Summer Vacation) (Lyrics by Hasama; Performed by Emiri Iwai)	Shinji Orito	Ryō Mizutsuki	5:00
17.	"Yoru wa Mijikaku, Sora wa Tōkute..." (夜は短く、空は遠くて... The Night is Short, The Sky is Far Away...)	Ryō Mizutsuki	Ryō Mizutsuki	4:07
18.	"Alkatale -recall-" (アルカテイル Arukateiru)	Shinji Orito	Shinji Orito	2:32

Disc 3
No.	Title	Music	Arrangement	Length
1.	"Sea, You Next"	Jun Maeda	Bermei Inazawa	2:35
2.	"Twinkle of Alcor"	Donmaru	Donmaru	4:54
3.	"Childish White"	Shinji Orito	Shinji Orito	4:26
4.	"Tokiami" (時編み The Timeweave)	Ryō Mizutsuki	Ryō Mizutsuki	2:07
5.	"Mabushisa no Naka" (眩しさの中 Inside the Radiance)	Ryō Mizutsuki	Ryō Mizutsuki	4:20
6.	"Yasōka" (夜奏花 Evening Medley of Fireworks) (Lyrics by Kai; Performed by Yurika)	Tomohiro Takeshita	Tomohiro Takeshita	5:53
7.	"Sea, Your Memory"	Jun Maeda	Bermei Inazawa	3:13
8.	"Hane no Yurikago" (羽のゆりかご Cradle of Wings) (Lyrics by Yū Niijima; Performed by Runa Mizutani)	Shinji Orito	Yūichiro Tsukagoshi	5:37
9.	"Alkatale -story-" (アルカテイル Arukateiru)	Shinji Orito	Ryō Mizutsuki	4:42
10.	"Pocket o Fukuramasete" (ポケットをふくらませて Stuffing My Pockets Full) (Lyrics by Jun Maeda; Performed by Rionos)	Jun Maeda	Bermei Inazawa	6:51
11.	"Alkatale" (アルカテイル Arukateiru) (Lyrics by Kai; Performed by Konomi Suzuki)	Shinji Orito	Masato Nakayama	4:50
12.	"Lasting Moment" (Lyrics by Yū Niijima; Performed by Konomi Suzuki)	Donmaru	Donmaru	5:35
13.	"Alkatale (Instrumental) (Game Size Ver)" (アルカテイル Arukateiru)	Shinji Orito	Masato Nakayama	2:13
Total length:				186:59

=== Sing! ===
Sing! is an image song album for the Summer Pockets visual novel, and it was released on December 29, 2018, at Comiket 95 in Japan by Key Sounds Label bearing the catalog number KSLA-0152. The album is for the heroines Shiroha Naruse, Ao Sorakado, Kamome Kushima and Tsumugi Wenders, and contains one disc with 14 tracks in regular and instrumental versions sung by Konomi Kohara (Shiroha), Natsumi Takamori (Ao), Tomomi Mineuchi (Kamome), Emiri Iwai (Tsumugi), Ayaka Kitazawa and Yurika. "Natsu ni Kimi o Machinagara", "Hiyoku no Chōtachi", "Departure!" and "With" were later used as insert songs in Summer Pockets Reflection Blue. The album is composed, arranged and produced by Shinji Orito, Ryō Mizutsuki, Donmaru, Tomohiro Takeshita, Yūichiro Tsukagoshi and Shōji Morifuji.

Track listing
No.	Title	Music	Arrangement	Length
1.	"Natsu ni Kimi o Machinagara" (夏に君を待ちながら Waiting for You in the Summer) (Lyrics by Yū Niijima; Performed by Konomi Kohara)	Ryō Mizutsuki	Ryō Mizutsuki	4:39
2.	"Hiyoku no Chōtachi" (比翼の蝶たち Wings of the Butterflies) (Lyrics by Kai; Performed by Natsumi Takamori)	Shinji Orito	Yūichiro Tsukagoshi	4:52
3.	"Departure!" (Lyrics by Yū Niijima; Performed by Tomomi Mineuchi)	Shinji Orito	Shōji Morifuji	4:47
4.	"Golden Hours" (Lyrics by Hasama; Performed by Emiri Iwai)	Tomohiro Takeshita	Yūichiro Tsukagoshi	4:52
5.	"With" (Lyrics by Yū Niijima; Performed by Tomomi Mineuchi)	Donmaru	Shōji Morifuji	5:41
6.	"Little Diary" (Lyrics by Ryō Mizutsuki; Performed by Ayaka Kitazawa)	Ryō Mizutsuki	Ryō Mizutsuki	5:06
7.	"Summer Tale" (サマーテイル Samā Teiru) (Lyrics by Kai; Performed by Yurika)	Tomohiro Takeshita	Tomohiro Takeshita	4:43
8.	"Natsu ni Kimi o Machinagara (Instrumental)" (夏に君を待ちながら Waiting for You in the Summer)	Ryō Mizutsuki	Ryō Mizutsuki	4:39
9.	"Hiyoku no Chōtachi (Instrumental)" (比翼の蝶たち Wings of the Butterflies)	Shinji Orito	Yūichiro Tsukagoshi	4:52
10.	"Departure! (Instrumental)"	Shinji Orito	Shōji Morifuji	4:47
11.	"Golden Hours (Instrumental)"	Tomohiro Takeshita	Yūichiro Tsukagoshi	4:52
12.	"With (Instrumental)"	Donmaru	Shōji Morifuji	5:41
13.	"Little Diary (Instrumental)"	Ryō Mizutsuki	Ryō Mizutsuki	5:06
14.	"Summer Tale (Instrumental)" (サマーテイル Samā Teiru)	Tomohiro Takeshita	Tomohiro Takeshita	4:42
Total length:				69:19

=== Summer Session: Hito Natsu no Bōken ===
Summer Session: Hito Natsu no Bōken (Summer Session ～ひと夏の冒険～) is a remix album which contains a selection of songs from the visual novel Summer Pockets, remixed by Hideki Higuchi. The album is otherwise composed and produced by Jun Maeda, Shinji Orito, Donmaru, Tomohiro Takeshita and Ryō Mizutsuki. It was released on December 29, 2018, at Comiket 95 in Japan by Key Sounds Label bearing the catalog number KSLA-0153. The album contains one disc with eight remixed music tracks from the visual novel.

Track listing
No.	Title	Music	Length
1.	"Hanahiraku Tabidachi - Aru Katei, Ruriiro no Monogatari" (花ひらく旅立ち - ある仮定、瑠璃色の物語 Flower Opening Departure - An Assuming, Bright Blue Story)	Shinji Orito	5:25
2.	"Asagiri no Mukō, Kagayaku Keshiki" (朝霧のむこう、輝く景色 Beyond the Morning Mist, Shining Scenery)	Ryō Mizutsuki	2:37
3.	"Neko ni Michibikarete" (猫に導かれて Guided by a Cat)	Tomohiro Takeshita	4:11
4.	"Komorebi no Sasu Komichi o Susunda Saki ni" (木漏れ日のさす小道を進んだ先に I Preceded Down a Path of Sunlight Filtering Through the Trees)	Shinji Orito	3:27
5.	"Hirogaru Umi, Suiheisen to Kamome" (広がる海、水平線とカモメ The Spreading Seas, the Horizon and Seagulls)	Jun Maeda	4:39
6.	"Sunahama ni Tsuketa Ashiato wa Nami ga Saratte" (砂浜につけた足跡は波がさらって The Footprints Left on the Sandy Beach are Swept Away by Waves)	Ryō Mizutsuki	3:32
7.	"Taisetsuna Mono wa Kokoro ni Nokoru darō" (大切なものは心に残るだろう Precious Things Will Remain in the Heart)	Shinji Orito	3:43
8.	"Sore wa Asu no Jibun no e no Okurimono" (それは明日の自分のへの贈り物 That is Tomorrow's Gift to Myself)	Donmaru	5:39
Total length:			33:13

=== Seven's Sea ===
Seven's Sea is a remix album which contains a selection of songs from the visual novel Summer Pockets remixed into electronic dance music. It was released on April 29, 2019, at the Character1 event in Japan by Key Sounds Label bearing the catalog number KSLA-0161. The album contains one disc with 12 tracks originally composed by Jun Maeda Shinji Orito, Donmaru and Tomohiro Takeshita, and features 12 separate remix artists. Seven artists provide vocals for nine songs: Aimi Tanaka sings "Chaahan Rhapsody", Emiri Iwai sings "Tsumugi no Natsuyasumi", Runa Mizutani sings "Splash Shooter" and "Hane no Yurikago", Ayaka Kitazawa sings "Silhouette", Yurika sings "Yasōka", Konomi Suzuki sings "Lasting Moment" and "Alkatale", and Rionos sings "Pocket o Fukuramasete".

Track listing
No.	Title	Music	Arrangement	Length
1.	"Sea, Your Memory (LU-I remix)"	Jun Maeda	LU-I	4:53
2.	"Chaahan Rhapsody" (チャーハン・ラプソディ Fried Rice Rhapsody) (Lyrics by Kai; Performed by Aimi Tanaka)	Donmaru	Nasuno	4:47
3.	"Tsumugi no Natsuyasumi (Yuma Mizonokuchi Remix)" (紬の夏休み Tsumugi's Summer Vacation) (Lyrics by Hasama; Performed by Emiri Iwai)	Shinji Orito	Yuma Mizonokuchi	4:53
4.	"Splash Shooter" (Lyrics by Meiko Yamamoto; Performed by Runa Mizutani)	Shinji Orito	Nasuno, Kan	3:59
5.	"Silhouette" (Lyrics by Yū Niijima; Performed by Ayaka Kitazawa)	Shinji Orito	Nasuno	5:14
6.	"Hitonatsu no Tawamure (Concerto Beats Remix)" (ひと夏のたわむれ Frolic Summer)	Donmaru	Muzik Servant, Neppi	4:41
7.	"Yasōka (Freezer Remix)" (夜奏花 Evening Medley of Fireworks) (Lyrics by Kai; Performed by Yurika)	Tomohiro Takeshita	Freezer	5:39
8.	"Lasting Moment (Return of the 00's Remix)" (Lyrics by Yū Niijima; Performed by Konomi Suzuki)	Donmaru	Yūichiro Tsukagoshi	7:06
9.	"Kano Kioku, Ano Kioku (Metal Remix)" (かの記憶、あの記憶 This Memory, That Memory)	Shinji Orito	Kan	4:50
10.	"Pocket o Fukuramasete (100-200+tanigon remix)" (ポケットをふくらませて Stuffing My Pockets Full) (Lyrics by Jun Maeda; Performed by Rionos)	Jun Maeda	100-200, Tanigon	5:26
11.	"Hane no Yurikago (HN Mellow Remix)" (羽のゆりかご Cradle of Wings) (Lyrics by Yū Niijima; Performed by Runa Mizutani)	Shinji Orito	Tatuki Harada, Nasuno	5:15
12.	"Alkatale (Taishi Remix)" (アルカテイル Arukateiru) (Lyrics by Kai; Performed by Konomi Suzuki)	Shinji Orito	Taishi	6:16
Total length:				62:59

=== Echoes of Summer ===
Echoes of Summer is a remix album which contains a selection of songs from the visual novel Summer Pockets, remixed by Hironori Anazawa. The album is otherwise composed and produced by Jun Maeda, Shinji Orito, Donmaru, Tomohiro Takeshita and Ryō Mizutsuki. It was released on July 27, 2019, in Japan by Key Sounds Label bearing the catalog number KSLA-0162. The album contains one disc with 12 remixed music tracks from the visual novel, and it was performed by the Petrozavodsk State Philharmonic Orchestra, the Taurida State Symphony Orchestra, and the Tokyo Chamber Orchestra.

Track listing
No.	Title	Music	Length
1.	"Summer Pockets"	Ryō Mizutsuki	4:20
2.	"Alkatale -Instrument-" (アルカテイル Arukateiru)	Shinji Orito	4:48
3.	"Sea, You & Me"	Jun Maeda	5:18
4.	"Semigoe to Tomo ni ～ Natsuyasumi no Sugoshikata ～ Saka no Ue no Kagerō" (蝉声とともに～夏休みの過ごし方～坂の上の陽炎 Alongside Chirping Cicadas ～ How to Spend the Summer Vacation ～ The Heat Haze Above the Hill)	Ryō Mizutsuki ("Semigoe to Tomo ni"; Shinji Orito ("Natsuyasumi no Sugoshikata"); Donmaru ("Saka no Ue no Kagerō")	5:48
5.	"White with You"	Ryō Mizutsuki	3:48
6.	"Golden Hours"	Tomohiro Takeshita	3:18
7.	"Niji no Chō ～ Kano Kioku, Ano Kioku" (虹の蝶～かの記憶、あの記憶 Rainbow Butterflies ～ This Memory, That Memory)	Shinji Orito	5:33
8.	"Tsumugi no Natsuyasumi -Instrument-" (紬の夏休み Tsumugi's Summer Vacation)	Shinji Orito	5:47
9.	"Lasting Moment -Instrument-"	Donmaru	5:36
10.	"Yasōka -Instrument-" (夜奏花 Evening Medley of Fireworks)	Tomohiro Takeshita	6:08
11.	"Hane no Yurikago -Instrument-" (羽のゆりかご Cradle of Wings)	Shinji Orito	5:38
12.	"Pocket o Fukuramasete -Instrument-" (ポケットをふくらませて Stuffing My Pockets Full)	Jun Maeda	6:49
Total length:			62:51

=== Edain ===
Edain is a remix album which contains a selection of songs from the visual novel Summer Pockets Reflection Blue, remixed by Toshihiko Uchiyama. The album is otherwise composed and produced by Shinji Orito and Ryō Mizutsuki. This album was released as a bonus item, included with the limited and special editions version of Summer Pockets Reflection Blue for Windows released on June 26, 2020, and it bears the catalog number KSLA-0169 by Key Sounds Label. As a result, it was not released for individual sale. The album contains one disc with eight remixed music tracks from the visual novel. Runa Mizutani sings "Hane no Yurikago", Konomi Suzuki sings "Asterlore", and Rita provides vocals for the song "Natsu no Sunadokei".

Track listing
No.	Title	Music	Length
1.	"Splash Green"	Shinji Orito	4:43
2.	"Shiosai no Kaori" (潮騒の香り Fragrance of the Roaring Sea)	Ryō Mizutsuki	4:12
3.	"Furikaeranakute mo Yatsu wa Iru" (振り返らなくてもヤツはいる There He is Even Without Turning Back)	Shinji Orito	3:32
4.	"Hane no Yurikago" (羽根のゆりかご Cradle of Wings) (Lyrics by Yū Niijima; Performed by Runa Mizutani)	Shinji Orito	5:38
5.	"Run Red Run"	Shinji Orito	4:39
6.	"Niji no Chō" (虹の蝶 Rainbow Butterflies)	Shinji Orito	4:00
7.	"Natsu no Sunadokei" (夏の砂時計 Hourglass of Summer) (Performed by Rita)	Ryō Mizutsuki	3:17
8.	"Asterlore" (アスタロア Asutaroa) (Lyrics by Kai; Performed by Konomi Suzuki)	Shinji Orito	4:41
Total length:			34:42

=== Summer Chronicle ===
Summer Chronicle is a remix album with music tracks taken from the Air, Kud Wafter and Summer Pockets visual novels and arranged into violin and piano versions by Hironori Anazawa. The album is otherwise composed by Jun Maeda, Shinji Orito, Magome Togoshi, Jun'ichi Shimizu and Donmaru. It was released on August 22, 2020, in Japan by Key Sounds Label bearing the catalog number KSLA-0170. The album contains one disc with ten tracks; tracks 1–4 are from Air, tracks 5 and 6 are from Kud Wafter, and tracks 7–10 are from Summer Pockets.

Track listing
No.	Title	Music	Length
1.	"Natsukage" (夏影 Summer Lights)	Jun Maeda	3:20
2.	"Yumegatari" (夢語り Dream-telling)	Shinji Orito	3:07
3.	"Semigoromo" (蝉衣 Thin Clothes)	Magome Togoshi	3:31
4.	"Tsukiwarawa" (月童 Moon Child)	Magome Togoshi	3:49
5.	"At The Mountain Behind"	Jun'ichi Shimizu	3:11
6.	"August Green"	Jun'ichi Shimizu	3:06
7.	"Summer Aventure" (さま～あばんちゅ～る Samā Abanchūru)	Donmaru	3:28
8.	"Natsu no Komoriuta" (夏の子守歌 Summer Lullaby)	Shinji Orito	4:03
9.	"Deep Blue Blue"	Shinji Orito	3:27
10.	"Twinkle of Alcor"	Donmaru	3:33
Total length:			34:35

=== Sing! 2 ===
Sing! 2 is an image song album for the Summer Pockets Reflection Blue visual novel, and it was released on December 20, 2020, at Visual Arts Winter Fes in Japan by Key Sounds Label bearing the catalog number KSLA-0183. The album is for the heroines Shiki Kamiyama, Shizuku Mizuori and Miki Nomura, and contains one disc with six tracks in regular and instrumental versions sung by Ai Fairouz (Shiki), Sahomi Koyama (Shizuku) and Saku Ichimiya (Miki). The album is composed, arranged and produced by Shinji Orito, Ryō Mizutsuki, Toshihiko Uchiyama, Shoyū and Tomoyuki Nakazawa.

Track listing
No.	Title	Music	Arrangement	Length
1.	"Don't Cry Red" (Lyrics by Kai; Performed by Ai Fairouz)	Shinji Orito	Toshihiko Uchiyama	5:01
2.	"Yawarakai Kioku" (柔らかい記憶 Tender Memory) (Lyrics by Hasama; Performed by Sahomi Koyama)	Ryō Mizutsuki	Ryō Mizutsuki, Shoyū	4:41
3.	"Dear Familiar" (Lyrics by Kai; Performed by Saku Ichimiya)	Shinji Orito	Tomoyuki Nakazawa	5:12
4.	"Don't Cry Red (Instrumental)"	Shinji Orito	Toshihiko Uchiyama	5:01
5.	"Yawarakai Kioku (Instrumental)" (柔らかい記憶 Tender Memory)	Ryō Mizutsuki	Ryō Mizutsuki, Shoyū	4:41
6.	"Dear Familiar (Instrumental)"	Shinji Orito	Tomoyuki Nakazawa	5:11
Total length:				29:47

=== Summer Pockets Reflection Blue Original Soundtrack ===
The Summer Pockets Reflection Blue Original Soundtrack, from the visual novel Summer Pockets Reflection Blue, was released on December 25, 2020, bearing the catalog number KSLA-0182. The soundtrack contains one disc with 15 music tracks composed, arranged, and produced by Jun Maeda, Shinji Orito, Donmaru, Ryō Mizutsuki, Bermei Inazawa, Shoyū, Shōji Morifuji, and Yūichiro Tsukagoshi. Konomi Suzuki sings "Asterlore", Yurika sings "Aoki Konata", Runa Mizutani sings "Natsu no Sunadokei", and Rionos sings "Pocket o Fukuramasete (Sea, you again)".

Track listing
No.	Title	Music	Arrangement	Length
1.	"Asterlore -blue-" (アスタロア Asutaroa)	Shinji Orito	Ryō Mizutsuki	2:32
2.	"Shiosai no Kaori" (潮騒の香り Fragrance of the Roaring Sea)	Ryō Mizutsuki	Ryō Mizutsuki	5:35
3.	"Splash Green"	Shinji Orito	Shoyū	3:48
4.	"Tender Purple"	Ryō Mizutsuki	Ryō Mizutsuki	5:56
5.	"Run Red Run"	Shinji Orito	Shōji Morifuji	4:40
6.	"Lover Universe"	Donmaru	Donmaru	4:54
7.	"Piece of Clear"	Donmaru	Donmaru	6:34
8.	"Natsu no Shion" (夏の紫苑 Aster of Summer)	Shinji Orito	Shōji Morifuji	4:55
9.	"Asterlore -reflect-" (アスタロア Asutaroa)	Shinji Orito	Shinji Orito	2:02
10.	"Kaze wa Kasuka ni, Netsu o Nokoshi..." (風は微かに、熱を残し… The Wind is Faint and Leaves Some Heat Behind...)	Ryō Mizutsuki	Ryō Mizutsuki	2:25
11.	"Twinkle of Aster"	Donmaru	Donmaru	2:33
12.	"Asterlore (Game Size Ver)" (アスタロア Asutaroa) (Lyrics by Kai; Performed by Konomi Suzuki)	Shinji Orito	Yūichiro Tsukagoshi	2:19
13.	"Aoki Konata (Game Size Ver)" (青き此方 It's Blue Here) (Lyrics by Kai; Performed by Yurika)	Donmaru	Donmaru	3:30
14.	"Natsu no Sunadokei" (夏の砂時計 Hourglass of Summer) (Lyrics by Kai; Performed by Runa Mizutani)	Ryō Mizutsuki	Ryō Mizutsuki	5:05
15.	"Pocket o Fukuramasete (Sea, you again)" (ポケットをふくらませて Stuffing My Pockets Full) (Lyrics by Jun Maeda; Performed by Rionos)	Jun Maeda	Bermei Inazawa	6:50
Total length:				63:38

== Singles ==
=== Alkatale ===
"Alkatale" (アルカテイル, Arukateiru) is a single from the visual novel Summer Pockets containing the game's opening theme song sung by Konomi Suzuki, and it was released on March 28, 2018, by Key Sounds Label bearing the catalog numbers KSLA-0146 and KSLM-0146. The single contains one disc with five tracks, two of which are background music tracks. The single is composed, arranged, and produced by Shinji Orito, Ryō Mizutsuki and Masato Nakayama.

Track listing
No.	Title	Music	Arrangement	Length
1.	"Alkatale" (アルカテイル Arukateiru) (Lyrics by Kai; Performed by Konomi Suzuki)	Shinji Orito	Masato Nakayama	4:48
2.	"Alkatale (Game Size)" (アルカテイル Arukateiru) (Lyrics by Kai; Performed by Konomi Suzuki)	Shinji Orito	Masato Nakayama	2:11
3.	"Alkatale (Instrumental)" (アルカテイル Arukateiru)	Shinji Orito	Masato Nakayama	4:50
4.	"Summer Pockets BGM1" ("Summer Pockets" on the Summer Pockets Original Soundtrack)	Ryō Mizutsuki	Ryō Mizutsuki	3:58
5.	"Summer Pockets BGM2" ("Alkatale -story-" on the Summer Pockets Original Soundtrack)	Shinji Orito	Ryō Mizutsuki	4:15
Total length:				20:02

=== Asterlore ===
"Asterlore" (アスタロア, Asutaroa) is a single from the visual novel Summer Pockets Reflection Blue containing two of the game's theme songs, and it was released on April 30, 2020, by Key Sounds Label bearing the catalog number KSLA-0168. The single contains one disc with five tracks, one of which is a background music track. The single is composed, arranged, and produced by Shinji Orito, Shin Kusakawa, Yūichiro Tsukagoshi and Donmaru. "Asterlore" sung by Konomi Suzuki is the opening theme, and "Shiroha no Komoriuta" sung by Konomi Kohara is an insert song.

Track listing
No.	Title	Music	Arrangement	Length
1.	"Asterlore" (アスタロア Asutaroa) (Lyrics by Kai; Performed by Konomi Suzuki)	Shinji Orito	Yūichiro Tsukagoshi	4:38
2.	"Shiroha no Komoriuta" (しろはの子守歌 Shiroha's Cradle Song) (Lyrics by Hakushū Kitahara; Performed by Konomi Kohara)	Shin Kusakawa	Donmaru	1:42
3.	"Reflection Blue"	Shinji Orito		2:18
4.	"Asterlore (Game Size)" (アスタロア Asutaroa) (Lyrics by Kai; Performed by Konomi Suzuki)	Shinji Orito	Yūichiro Tsukagoshi	2:17
5.	"Asterlore (Instrumental)" (アスタロア Asutaroa)	Shinji Orito	Yūichiro Tsukagoshi	4:38
Total length:				15:33

=== Asterlore / Aoki Konata / Natsu no Sunadokei ===
"Asterlore / Aoki Konata / Natsu no Sunadokei" (アスタロア / 青き此方 / 夏の砂時計) is a single from the visual novel Summer Pockets Reflection Blue containing three of the game's theme songs, and it was released on September 25, 2020, by Key Sounds Label bearing the catalog number KSLA-0173. The single contains one disc with six tracks in regular and instrumental versions. The single is composed, arranged, and produced by Shinji Orito, Donmaru, Ryō Mizutsuki and Yūichiro Tsukagoshi. "Asterlore" sung by Konomi Suzuki is the opening theme, "Aoki Konata" sung by Yurika is one of the ending themes, and "Natsu no Sunadokei" sung by Runa Mizutani is an insert song.

Track listing
No.	Title	Music	Arrangement	Length
1.	"Asterlore" (アスタロア Asutaroa) (Lyrics by Kai; Performed by Konomi Suzuki)	Shinji Orito	Yūichiro Tsukagoshi	4:38
2.	"Aoki Konata" (青き此方 It's Blue Here) (Lyrics by Kai; Performed by Yurika)	Donmaru	Donmaru	4:53
3.	"Natsu no Sunadokei" (夏の砂時計 Hourglass of Summer) (Lyrics by Kai; Performed by Runa Mizutani)	Ryō Mizutsuki	Ryō Mizutsuki	5:07
4.	"Asterlore (Instrumental)" (アスタロア Asutaroa)	Shinji Orito	Yūichiro Tsukagoshi	4:36
5.	"Aoki Konata (Instrumental)" (青き此方 It's Blue Here)	Donmaru	Donmaru	4:53
6.	"Natsu no Sunadokei (Instrumental)" (夏の砂時計 Hourglass of Summer)	Ryō Mizutsuki	Ryō Mizutsuki	5:06
Total length:				29:13

== Chart positions ==
Albums	Release date	Label	Format	Peak Oricon chart positions
"Alkatale"	March 28, 2018	Key Sounds Label (KSLA-0146, KSLM-0146)	CD	66
Summer Pockets Original Soundtrack	September 26, 2018	Key Sounds Label (KSLA-0149—0151, KSLM-0149—0151)	CD	36
