= Joshi kōsei =

Joshi kōsei, joshi kousei or joshikōsei (Japanese: 女子高生) literally means "high school girl". In English usage the term may refer to:

- High School Girls, a comedy manga series by Towa Oshima
- Joshi Kausei a comedy manga series by Ken Wakai.
- Oku-sama wa Joshi Kōsei, a manga series by Hiyoko Kobayashi
- JK business, compensated dating with adolescent girls in Japan
- A homonym (Japanese: 女子校生, joshi kōsei, which can mean "girl student") that is used to label Japanese pornographic videos hinting that high school girls are portrayed
