= Slow start =

Slow start is an idiom referring to a lack of success at first.

Slow start may also refer to:

- Slow start is part of the TCP congestion control strategy
- Slow Start (manga), a Japanese manga series
