= List of Hanebado! episodes =

Anime key visual featuring Nagisa Aragaki, Ayano Hanesaki, and other badminton players

Hanebado! is an anime series adapted from the manga of the same title by Kōsuke Hamada. It aired from July 2 (Note: Tokyo MX listed the show at 24:00 on July 1, which is at midnight on July 2, 2018.) to October 1, 2018, on Tokyo MX and other channels. It ran for 13 episodes in 6 DVD/Blu-ray releases. The series was directed by Shinpei Ezaki and written by Taku Kishimoto, with animation by Liden Films. Satoshi Kimura provided the character designs, and Tatsuya Kato composed the music. The opening theme is "Futari no Hane" (ふたりの羽根) by Yurika, and the ending theme is "High Stepper" (ハイステッパー, Hai Suteppā) by Yuiko Ōhara. Due to the 2018 Hokkaido earthquake, the last three episodes were delayed by a week.

The series was simulcast worldwide outside Asia by Crunchyroll with English subtitles, and in North America, the British Isles and Australasia with an English dub by Funimation.

== Episode list ==
No.	Title (Note: All English titles are taken from Crunchyroll.)	Original air date
1	"Incredible Talent!"; Transliteration: "Suggoi Sainō!" (Japanese: スッゴい才能！)	July 2, 2018
Nagisa Aragaki faces Ayano Hanesaki at the Junior Nationals badminton tournament and loses in a blowout. She has been depressed since that loss and as captain of the badminton club, takes out her frustration on the new potential club members. At the start of a new school year, Noriko Miyura overhears Ayano and Elena Fujisawa wanting to join a school club, and advises them against the badminton club and promotes the tennis club instead. Later, Riko Izumi sees Ayano while walking home, but in disbelief decides she has mistaken someone else for her. The next day, Kentarō Tachibana scouts for badminton members while watching a practice match at the tennis club. A powerful serve goes out of bounds and heads straight for Elena, which Ayano deflects with ease. Kentarō notices this and boldly approaches Ayano while Elena accuses him of being a pervert and protects her. Nagisa also sees Ayano, much to her disbelief. Later, Tarōmaru Miyako, the badminton club's advisor, introduces Kentarō as the new coach for the badminton club. Elena drags Ayano to the badminton club in an attempt to get her to join.
2	"Meat's the Best After a Workout!"; Transliteration: "Undō no Nochi no Niku wa kakubetsussu!" (Japanese: 運動の後の肉は格別ッス！)	July 9, 2018
Nagisa and Ayano face off in a match as Tarōmaru watches. Kentarō advises Nagisa and Ayano to practice together, but Ayano disagrees, and Nagisa practices with Riko instead. The next day, Kentarō and Gaku Isehara have a practice match against Nagisa and Ayano in pairs, but Nagisa and Ayano are unable to work together. Kentarō switches Nagisa out with Riko and the match improves. Later at a convenience store, Yu Ebina, another badminton club member, stops to eat a corn dog. She sees Nagisa walk by and offers her to eat together. Nagisa snaps at Yu for commenting about how she had talent, because when Nagisa was younger, everyone around her said that she only won because she was tall. At the end of practice the next day, Kentarō challenges Nagisa to a mock match. During the match, he concludes that Nagisa is too focused on controlling the match, but he also knows that she genuinely loves badminton, which he uses to get her out of her slump.
3	"She Was Perfect"; Transliteration: "Aitsu wa kanpeki datta" (Japanese: アイツは完璧だった)	July 16, 2018
In a flashback, Uchika Hanesaki (Ayano's mother) practices with her as Elena watches and counts how many returns Ayano had. In middle school, Ayano quits badminton after her mother leaves. In the present, Ayano seems to be depressed during practice. Elena goes to see a movie with Noriko and has tea, where she sees Nagisa and has a talk with her about Ayano. Later, at practice, a girl from another school called Kaoruko Serigaya challenges Ayano to a friendly match, and Ayano loses. As a result, Ayano does not come to school the next day, and Kentarō and Nagisa go to visit her. Cho and Masashi, her grandparents greet them instead and inform the two that Ayano is not at home. While at her house, Kentarō sees Uchika's medals and trophies. The grandparents tell them that Uchika was a badminton champion before retiring. Later, Elena finds Ayano, who tells her that, back in middle school Kaoruko got her sick with a cold before an important badminton match, which disappointed Uchika and caused her to leave. Elena asks Nagisa to help her cheer up Ayano. Nagisa meets her and plays badminton at the playground, and Ayano's mood improves. The next day, Ayano and Elena formally join the badminton club.
4	"I'm Lost Right Now, Too"; Transliteration: "Watashi mo ima, maigona nda" (Japanese: 私も今、迷子なんだ)	July 23, 2018
The badminton training camp starts, and the club is greeted by the Fredericia girls' badminton club, who are training in the same place. Kentarō comes up with a strategy for single and doubles matches while Ayano goes to a convenience store to pick up some things. Nagisa draws a map for her, but Ayano ends up getting lost. She is approached by a girl wearing shades, who is going to the same store. Meanwhile, the rest of the Fredericia members wonder where their last member is. As they get to the store, the girl with shades asks what high school Ayano is in and starts questioning her, when Sora Isehara, one of the club members, shows up, and both her and Ayano leave. The girl with shades is revealed to be Connie, a member of the Fredericia girl's badminton club. She shows up late to the camp, worrying Hina Tagajo, her teammate for the match against Ayano and Riko. Before the match starts, Connie tells Hina to not get in her way, but Hina refuses, so Connie refrains from playing. Because of that, Hina struggles by herself, and eventually, Connie steps in and insisnts that she plays by herself. During the interval, Ayano sees that Connie ties her hair exactly the same way Ayano's mother used to.
5	"You're Not Alone"; Transliteration: "Hitori ja nai yo" (Japanese: 一人じゃないよ)	July 30, 2018
The match continues and Connie, despite playing by herself, is able to overpower both Ayano and Riko. She laments to Ayano that she is not like Uchika, shocking Ayano. Yuika and her team criticize Connie's selfishness to play by herself. During the short interval, Kentarō tells Riko to cover the front and Ayano, the back-court. The strategy works, but when Ayano tries to return a shot, one of the strings on her racket breaks, which causes her and Riko to lose the match. Ayano runs away, feeling depressed. Connie also feels depressed, ashamed about how she treated Hina, but is cheered up by Yuika and the rest of her club members at the inn. At night, Ayano tries to ask Connie about Uchika, but she gets scared and does not. Before leaving the training camp, Ayano asks Connie how she knows her mother, and she responds that Uchika is coming back to Japan and that she is her family. She also tells her she will beat her one on one to prove that Uchika is worthy of her love and walks away, leaving Ayano shell-shocked.
6	"It's Our Last Summer, You Know!"; Transliteration: "Saigo no Natsu nan da mon!" (Japanese: 最後の夏なんだもん!)	August 6, 2018
The brackets for the Inter-High badminton preliminaries have come out, and in her first match, Riko faces Nozomi Ishizawa, an old middle school friend, who was a semi-finalist in the previous year's badminton tournament. Nagisa tries to give advice to Riko on how to win, but Riko says that she is not like her. The preliminaries begin, and Nozomi has the upper hand as Riko doubts herself. Nagisa is able to motivate her, and she begins to play for real. Riko loses and Nozomi wins. Uchika shows up at the badminton tournament.
7	"I'll Mop the Floor With Her"; Transliteration: "Anna ko, shunsatsu shite miseru" (Japanese: あんな子、瞬殺してみせる)	August 13, 2018
Kaoruko watches Ayano's match against one of Kaoruko's teammates, who loses. As Ayano walks back to the stands, Kaoruko gives her a handkerchief to prepare her for what she claims will be Ayano's loss; Ayano takes it in stride. Later, Kaoruko has a disagreement with her team about her rival against Ayano. Afterwards, Kaoruko's match against Ayano begins, and Ayano has the upper hand. Ayano wins the first set with a score of 21–17, and the second set with a score of 21-16. She gives the same handkerchief back to Kaoruko, but Kaoruko does not accept it and heads back to the locker room, where she laments her loss to Ayano and cries. Ayano's team notice the change in her play and behavior. Ayano leaves, calling Kaoruko pathetic and claiming that the match was a let-down. Elena is shocked by this, and tells Ayano that she should respect her opponent, but Ayona brushes her off, stating that winning is all that matters. Later on, Yu checks out the tournament standings, which reveal the next semifinal match to be between Nagisa and Nozomi.
8	"The Badminton I Want to Play"; Transliteration: "Watashi no Yaritai Badominton" (Japanese: 最後の夏なんだもん!私のやりたいバドミントン)	August 20, 2018
In a flashback, at Totsuka middle school Nozomi loses to Nagisa in a match. Miyako walks out of the restroom with Riko and sees that Nagisa is preparing for the semifinal match with Nozomi. Kentarō checks up on Nagisa so that she is not overthinking about the match. Nozomi overhears a conversation with her opponent after advancing to the semifinal match. Ayano's opponent pulled a muscle, and told them to quit if they were unable to continue. She insists she can play, but Ayano tells her there's no point and forces her to forfeit. Elena witness this and asked about Ayano's strange behavior and lack of care for her opponents feelings. Ayano states that she didn't join for the team, but only to win. Elena asks why winning is so important to her, but she does not answer her. The semifinal match between Nagisa and Nozomi starts, with Nozomi at first getting the upper hand, but Nagisa manages to turn it around and wins the match.
9	"What I Want Us To Be Is Not 'Friends'"; Transliteration: "Naritai no Wa "tomodachi" ja nai" (Japanese: ンなりたいのは"友達" じゃない)	August 27, 2018
Connie and Yuika Shiwahime visit Ayano's badminton club before the final match of the tournament between Ayano and Nagisa. Connie wants a quick match with Ayano, but her keychain breaks. Yuika advises Ayano to try at a local festival, which might have an arcade that has it. While there, Yuika wins a whale backpack and gives it to Ayano. Later, Ayano and Connie talk alone. Connie nervously speaks to her as she pulls the backpack in front of Connie's face, and takes it away from her. Yuika and Elena returns, and Connie says that she, Ayano, and Uchika should be a family. Ayano interrupts her and wants to go somewhere. Yu is with Sora and asks who got into badminton first: Hayama or Gaku. Sora replies that Hayama invited her and Gaku to try the sport since they were young. Later, Yu sees Hayama practice at night and calls out to him, but he does not hear her, much to her anger. Connie and Ayano go to a badminton court behind the batting cages. Ayano shows her strange behavior that Elena was concerned about. In Denmark, Connie recalls a time Uchika began being her mother. One day she looks at Uchika's phone and saw a picture, Uchika said that it is her daughter back in Japan. The match ends, and Ayano tells her that she does not want to be a family with Connie. Later, Connie and Yuika return to the train station as the rest of their club members welcome them back. Uchika surprises Ayano at home.
10	"The Backhand Grip Is Like This"; Transliteration: "Bakkuhando no Nigiri wa kō" (Japanese: バックハンドの握りはこう)	September 3, 2018
In a flashback, Nagisa starts badminton in elementary school. Uchika has tea with Cho and Masashi as Ayano goes to her room, not happy to see her mother. At practice, Ayano suddenly wants a match with Kentarō, and asks Nagisa for a quick match before their final match of the tournament. While Riko thought she was provoking Nagisa about Ayano's remarks, Kentarō calms the situation by telling Gaku and Hayama to be prepared for the boy's preliminary tournament. At the locker room, Ayano picks a fight with Nagisa about her injured knee, but she refuses to retaliate as she leaves to see Tarōmaru and Kentarō. He asks about her knee, and Nagisa replies she is fine. Miyako talks about Kentarō's time before quitting the Olympics, in which his knee was hurt too. The boys' preliminary tournament started with Gaku winning his match. When Hayama's match looks bad, Yu walks out of the gym and Nagisa asks if something happened between the two of them. Gaku and Hayama lose later in the tournament, and Gaku wants to continue the sport into college. Yu watches Hayama practice at night again and gives him a water bottle. She confesses her feelings to him, but he thinks she was talking about badminton.
11	"Because I Love Badminton"; Transliteration: "Badominton ga sukida kara" (Japanese: バドミントンが好きだから)	September 17, 2018 (Note: Episode 11 was delayed at a later date as a result of the 2018 Hokkaido Eastern Iburi earthquake.)
At dinner, Uchika wants to reconnect with Ayano, who goes to her room and ignores her when she tries to talk to her. At practice, Yu and Riko notice Ayano is spacing out lately. Hayama and Gaku show up for practice, when Ayano suddenly wants a match with Hayama, which he loses. When Hayama tries to leave out of the gym, Nagisa tells Ayano to stop. Ayano asks Nagisa for a match too, but she tells her to wait until the tournament in two days. At the end of practice, Nagisa goes jogging and sees Riko with her siblings. Uchika tries to bond with Ayano again, but she ignores her yet again. At night, Nagisa watches the badminton match between Kaoruko and Ayano, and she sees the same expression Ayano had at the Junior Nationals. At the venue of the final match, Yuka and her friends show up and speak to Riko. Both Ayano and Nagisa are preparing, and Ayano does not want Yu's encouragement and insults her team, but Elena takes her away and questions why she would say such things and what she is fighting for. Ayano tells her Uchika came back and the real reason her mother abandoned her was so she could play better and now she's going to abandon her mom back. Upset at her friend's change of behavior, Elena tells her she regrets taking her to the badminton club and sadly walks away. The match between Ayano and Nagisa begins and Ayano is surprised by Nagisa's quick strategy. Uchika walks out to buy a drink as Elena wants to talk to her.
12	"Step Forward Already!"; Transliteration: "Ashi o mae ni dashinasai yo!" (Japanese: 足を前に出しなさいよ！)	September 24, 2018
In a flashback, Uchika goes through her suitcase, as Ayano tries to tell her about what happened during the badminton match with Kaoruko in middle school. Ayano returns Nagisa's serve for a point with a new strategy. Uchika tells Elena that she wanted to train Ayano. One day she went to the gym to see if Ayano is there, but she saw her train by herself. Uchika decided to leave Ayano with her grandparents. Ayano wins the first set with a score of 21-16. Elena thinks badminton is just a sport while Uchika sees it as a means to fame and wealth. Uchika states that what she did was unforgivable, she doesn't regret it and she's taking the next step and thanks Elena for bringing Ayano back to badminton. The second set starts with Ayano being cornered by Nagisa's serves. Kaoruko tries to encourage Ayano, but still feels pressured by Nagisa and lose the second set with a score of 21-18. During the interval, Yu and Sora try to comfort Ayano, but she warns them to leave her alone and they are annoying her. Sora tells Ayano not to lose on purpose, as everyone cheers on her to win.
13	"On the Other Side of That Net"; Transliteration: "Ano Shiroobi no Mukō ni" (Japanese: あの白帯のむこうに)	October 1, 2018
The third set begins and Ayano gains an advantage with a new strategy, while Nagisa becomes tired and asks for a short break. The match is evenly contested. Ayano tries to return Nagisa's serve but throws her racket towards the net instead, and Nagisa wins the tournament. Yu and Sora carry Ayano back to the locker room, who reverts back to her old self and thanks them for rooting her. Uchika meets her there and asks if she, Ayano, and Connie take a trip to Denmark. Ayano declines and wants to stay in Japan. Elena talks to Ayano about what happened before the tournament ended. Ayano apologizes for the way she treated her, and tearfully thanks her for being by her side and inviting her to play badminton again. Nagisa talks to Riko, who is surprised that Nagisa won. The next day everyone meets up at the gym. Riko tells them that Nagisa went to the hospital with Kentarō to check up on her knees, as she tells him she has patellar tendinitis. Ayano challenges Nagisa to a rematch, which she accepts. In a post credits, Ayano and Nagisa both have a private rematch.

== Home releases ==
=== Japanese ===
In Japan, Toho released the series in 6 volumes starting from September 19, 2018, to February 13, 2019.

Toho (Japan, Region 2 / A)
Volume	Episodes	Release date	Ref.
1	1–3	September 19, 2018	
2	4–5	October 17, 2018	
3	6–7	November 14, 2018	
4	8–9	December 19, 2018	
5	10–11	January 16, 2019	
6	12–13	February 13, 2019	

=== English ===
Funimation (Region 1/A)
Volume	Episodes	Release date	Ref.
1	1–13	August 13, 2019	
