= Reina Kondō =

Japanese voice actress and singer

- 近藤 玲奈
- Born: January 28, 1999 (age 27); Chiba Prefecture, Japan
- Occupations: Voice actress; singer
- Years active: 2015–present
- Agent: Hirata Office
- Musical career
- Genres: J-Pop; Anison
- Instrument: Vocals
- Years active: 2021–present
- Label: Nippon Columbia
- Website: columbia.jp/kondoreina/

Reina Kondō (近藤 玲奈; born January 28, 1999) is a Japanese voice actress, model, and singer from Chiba Prefecture who is affiliated with Hirata Office. She is known for her roles as Hana Ichinose in Slow Start and Suzuka Nagami in My Sister, My Writer. She, together with her Slow Start co-stars Ayasa Itō, Tomomi Mineuchi, and Maria Naganawa performed the series' opening theme "Ne! Ne! Ne!" under the name STARTails.

On April 14, 2021, she made her debut as a solo singer under Nippon Columbia.

On February 23, 2024, it was announced that she would be going on hiatus due to health issues, and her voice acting activities is being made limited.

== Filmography ==
=== Anime ===
2015

- Aoharu x Machinegun (Female student)
- Lance N' Masques (Pre-school student)

2016

- Sweetness and Lightning (Female class head)
- Cardfight!! Vanguard G (Stray cat)

2017

- Chōyū Sekai (Young girl, announcer)
- Kemono Friends (Asian small-clawed otter)
- Chronos Ruler (Girl, dancer, boy)
- Just Because! (Momoka Suzuki)

2018

- Karakai Jozu no Takagi-san (Bobcut hair girl)
- Slow Start (Hana Ichinose)
- My Sister, My Writer (Suzuka Nagami)
- Sword Art Online: Alicization (Ronye Arabel)

2019

- Boogiepop and Others (Kazuko Suema)
- Hachigatsu no Cinderella Nine (Ryō Shinonome)

2020

- Dorohedoro (Nikaidō)
- Dropout Idol Fruit Tart (Nina Maehara)

2021

- Horimiya (Sakura Kōno)
- Mazica Party (Anya do Glengard XII)
- World Trigger Season 2 (Hana Somei)
- Those Snow White Notes (Yui Yamazato)
- Battle Athletes Victory ReSTART! (Chal Walder)

2022

- Sabikui Bisco (Paū Nekoyanagi)
- Tribe Nine (Enoki Yukigaya)
- Hairpin Double (Pink/Hina Kawai)
- In the Heart of Kunoichi Tsubaki (Hagi)
- Akiba Maid War (Nagomi Wahira)
- The Eminence in Shadow (Eta)

2023

- Too Cute Crisis (Fianna Tierley)
- My Clueless First Friend (Umi Adachi)
- Horimiya: The Missing Pieces (Sakura Kōno)
- Helck (Alicia)
- Undead Girl Murder Farce (Carmilla)

2024

- Blue Archive the Animation (Aru Rikuhachima)
- Girls Band Cry (Hina)
- The Idolmaster Shiny Colors (Hiori Kazano)
- Mayonaka Punch (Otomi)
- How I Attended an All-Guy's Mixer (Nadeshiko)

2025

- #Compass 2.0: Combat Providence Analysis System (Soubiki Noho)
- My Friend's Little Sister Has It In for Me! (Midori Kageishi)
- Backstabbed in a Backwater Dungeon (Suzu)

2026

- Magical Girl Raising Project: Restart (Shadow Gale)
- Daemons of the Shadow Realm (Makoto Tachikawa)

2027

- Girls Band Cry: The Movie (Hina)

=== Video games ===
2015

- MapleStory (Athena Pierce)

2017

- Yuki Yuna Is a Hero: A Sparkling Flower (Anzu Iyojima)
- Magia Record: Puella Magi Madoka Magica Side Story (Kokoro Awane)

2018

- The Idolmaster Shiny Colors (Hiori Kazano)
- The Liar Princess and the Blind Prince (Narrator)
- Crystar (Rei Hatada/Kuon Hatada)

2020

- Azur Lane (Kashino)
- Arknights (Folinic)

2021

- Blue Archive (Aru Rikuhachima)
- Princess Connect! Re:Dive (Shifuna Agato)
- SINce Memories: Off the Starry Sky (Chihaya Houjou)

2022

- Fate/Grand Order (Trưng Trắc)
- Path to Nowhere (Mess)

2023

- Towa Tsugai (Karasu)
- Crymachina (Can)
- Tevi (Anisette, Amaretto, Katu)
- Granblue Fantasy (Utsusemi)

2024

- Dead or Alive Xtreme Venus Vacation (Reika)

2025

- Under Night In-Birth II: Sys:Celes (Izumi)

=== Live-action ===
- Anime Supremacy! (2022), Nanaka (voice)

=== Dubbing ===
- Strange World (2022), Azimuth
