= Rionos =

Japanese singer

Rio Okano 岡野 里音
- Also known as: Rionos
- Born: March 5, 1991 (age 35)
- Origin: Kobe, Japan
- Genres: J-pop; anison
- Occupations: Singer; songwriter; lyricist; music producer
- Instruments: Vocals; piano
- Years active: 2011–present
- Label: Lantis
- Website: rionos.net

Rio Okano (岡野 里音 Okano Rio, born on March 5, 1991, in Kobe, Japan), also known as Rionos, is a Japanese singer, songwriter, and music producer. She has provided the music for anime, video games and other singers. The name "Rionos" is derived from the nickname "Rio no Suke" that her friend called her.

== Biography ==
Okano was born into a musical family. Her mother was a classical marimba player and her father was a jazz drummer. She grew up learning piano and violin. As a high school student, she gave up trying to become a classical player and often spent time at home because of her physical condition. She was inspired by movies, anime and game music, and she began to think about becoming a composer who could work at home.

She entered Osaka University of Arts in 2009 as a correspondence student. Her condition improved, so she attended computer music school Dee in Osaka in the autumn of 2009. In 2011, she was no longer a correspondence student at Osaka University of Arts from third year.

She earned a reputation singing songs at Dee, so she sent her songs to record companies. Her songs caught Keitaro Kamo's ear, while he was director of EMI Music Japan. She released her first mini album read me (initially only for download sales. It was released on CD in 2013.）

After that, she provided songs for Yufu Terashima produced by Keitaro Kamo. In 2016, Lantis's producer Junnosuke Sato listened to her songs for Yufu and contacted her. She offered a demo of the theme song of Children of the Whales anime. She made her major debut from Lantis in 2017 in the anime's ending theme "Hashitairo". In the Märchen Mädchen anime of the following year, she composed background music in addition to ending theme.

In 2019, Rionos played the role of Reykjavík in the game, Machimusu Earth Defense Live.

== Personality ==
Okano claimed that her nickname was to express a little Greek-ish and mysterious feeling.

She is a big fan of Akino Arai, whom she used first as a model. After the release of read me., she became friends with Akino Arai and the arranger Hisaaki Hogari. She also likes the composers Ryuichi Sakamoto, Joe Hisaishi, and Yoko Kanno.

Singer Ryo Irei is a friend and has been given songs she composed several times. He participated on the chorus of a song "Sora wo Tobitai to", released with "Hashitairo".

== Discography ==
=== Personal discography ===
| Title | Album details | Notes |
|---|---|---|
| read me. | Released: May 15, 2013; Label: Independent | |
| ハシタイロ / Hashitairo | Released: October 25, 2017; Label: Lantis (LACM-14662) | |
| 百年のメラム / Hundred years' melammu | Released: October 25, 2017; Label: Lantis (LACM-14817) | Collection of Ulysses: Jeanne d'Arc and the Alchemist Knight ending theme songs. |

=== Anime soundtracks ===
| Title | Album details | Notes |
|---|---|---|
| D4：Dark Dreams Don’t Die original soundtrack | Released: 2014 | |
| Fortune Tellers Academy | Released: 2016 | |
| Märchen Mädchen Original Soundtrack | Released: March 28, 2018; Label: Lantis (LACA-15716) | |
| Kase-san and Morning Glories Original Soundtrack | Released: June 6, 2018; Label: Pony Canyon (PCCG-01671) | |
| Fragtime Original Soundtrack | Released: November 20, 2019; Label: Pony Canyon (PCCG-01839) | |
| Machimusu Earth Defense Live Original Soundtrack | Released: 2019 | |

=== Anime theme arrangement ===
| Title | Singer | Source | Role | Year |
|---|---|---|---|---|
| Ishukan Communication | Yūki Kuwahara, Maria Naganawa, Minami Takahashi, and Yūki Takada | Miss Kobayashi's Dragon Maid | Arrangement | 2017 |
| over and over | Nagi Yanagi | Just Because! | String arrangement | 2017 |
| sleepland | Reina Ueda | Märchen Mädchen | Lyrics, Composition, and Arrangement | 2018 |
| Dare mo Watashi wo Shiranai Sekai e | Reina Ueda | Märchen Mädchen | Lyrics, Composition, and Arrangement | 2018 |
| Viātor | Rionos | Maquia: When the Promised Flower Blooms | Lyrics, Composition, and Arrangement | 2018 |
| Futari no Hane | YURiKA | Hanebado! | String arrangement | 2018 |

=== Game themes ===
| Title | Singer | Source | Additional roles | Year |
|---|---|---|---|---|
| Hachimitsu Aji no Shiawase | Rionos | Kumapara | Lyrics | 2016 |
| Sign | Rionos | Afterlost | | 2016 |
| Pray | Haruka Chisuga | Angels of Death | Chorus and piano | 2018 |
| Reach for the Sunlight | Rionos | Afterlost | | 2018 |
| Pocket o Fukuramasete | Rionos | Summer Pockets | | 2018 |
| Harunire no Oka de Utsukushii Yakusoku o | Rionos | Alice Closet | Lyrics, Composition, and Arrangement | 2019 |
| City Girl | Rionos | Machimusu Earth Defense Live | Composition and Arrangement | 2019 |
| | Rionos | Indivisible | | 2019 |
| Lost Flowers | Rionos | Onmyoji: The Card Game | Lyrics, Composition, and Arrangement | 2020 |
| SYMPHONIA | | Takt Op. Unmei wa Akaki Senritsu no Machi o | Lyrics, Composition, and Arrangement | 2021 |
| After You Sleep | Rionos | Heaven Burns Red | | 2022 |
| Owari no Inori | Rionos | Stella of The End | Lyrics, Composition, and Arrangement | 2022 |
