= Summer Pockets =

2018 Japanese visual novel video game and its franchise

- Cover featuring heroines (from left to right) Kamome Kushima, Shiroha Naruse, Tsumugi Wenders and Ao Sorakado
- Developer: Key
- Publishers: Visual Arts (Windows); Prototype (Switch)
- Director: Kai
- Artists: Na-Ga; Tsubasu Izumi; Yūnon Nagayama; Fumuyun; Engiyoshi
- Writers: Jun Maeda (concept); Kai; Hasama; Yū Niijima
- Composers: Jun Maeda; Shinji Orito; Donmaru; Tomohiro Takeshita; Ryō Mizutsuki
- Platforms: Microsoft Windows, iOS, Android, Nintendo Switch, PlayStation 4
- Release: Summer Pockets June 29, 2018: Windows; JP: June 29, 2018; WW: February 5, 2020 iOS; JP: December 17, 2018 Android; JP: December 21, 2018 Nintendo Switch; JP: June 20, 2019; Reflection Blue June 26, 2020: Windows; JP: June 26, 2020; WW: June 27, 2025 Android; JP: August 20, 2020 iOS; JP: April 27, 2021 Nintendo Switch; JP: July 1, 2021 PlayStation 4; JP: July 21, 2022
- Genre: Visual novel
- Mode: Single-player
- Manga

Summer Pockets Mugyu Days: Tsumugi no Shima Sanpo
- Written by: Key
- Illustrated by: Yūnon Nagayama
- Published by: ASCII Media Works
- Magazine: Dengeki Moeoh; KadoComi
- Original run: February 28, 2025 – present
- Anime television series
- Directed by: Tomoki Kobayashi
- Produced by: Naoto Nakashima
- Written by: Keiichirō Ōchi
- Music by: Jun Maeda; Shinji Orito; Donmaru; Tomohiro Takeshita; Ryō Mizutsuki; Shūhei Ōhashi
- Studio: Feel
- Licensed by: Crunchyroll: SEA: Tropics Entertainment
- Original network: Tokyo MX, BS11, MBS, SBS, AT-X, TSC
- Original run: April 7, 2025 – September 29, 2025
- Episodes: 26
- Manga

Summer Pockets: Natsu no Takaramono
- Written by: Key
- Illustrated by: wogura
- Published by: Shueisha
- Magazine: Tonari no Young Jump
- Original run: May 30, 2025 – present
- icon

Summer Pockets is a Japanese visual novel developed by Key, a brand of Visual Arts. It was released on June 29, 2018, for Windows and is rated for all ages. Summer Pockets is Key's 13th game, following its previous games such as Kanon, Air, and Clannad. An expanded version of the game titled Summer Pockets Reflection Blue was released on June 26, 2020, in Japan. Both the original game and Reflection Blue have been ported to iOS and Android devices, and Nintendo Switch. Reflection Blue has also additionally been ported to the PlayStation 4. An English version of the original game for Windows was released by Visual Arts in 2020. The story is set on a fictional island on the Seto Inland Sea and follows the life of Hairi Takahara, a young man who uses the recent death of his grandmother as an excuse to escape to the island after an unpleasant incident. Once there, he gets to know the townsfolk of Torishirojima and multiple girls who are the focus of the story.

The gameplay in Summer Pockets follows an interactive branching plot line with multiple scenarios, and focuses on the player character gaining the favor of the four female main characters; this is expanded to seven in Reflection Blue. The game's concept is by Jun Maeda, but he did not write the scenario due to similarities in themes with Air, which he primarily wrote. Although Air also features a rural, seaside setting during the summer, the development team aimed for Summer Pockets to have a different feeling to it. Nostalgia and the maternal bond are prominent themes in the game. An anime television series adaptation produced by Feel aired from April to September 2025.

== Gameplay ==
Summer Pockets is a romance visual novel in which the player assumes the role of Hairi Takahara. Much of its gameplay is spent on reading the story's narrative and dialogue. The text in the game is accompanied by character sprites, which represent who Hairi is talking to, over background art. Throughout the game, the player encounters CG artwork at certain points in the story, which take the place of the background art and character sprites. When the game is completed at least once, a gallery of the viewed CGs and played background music becomes available on the game's title screen. Summer Pockets follows a branching plot line with multiple endings, and depending on the decisions that the player makes during the game, the plot will progress in a specific direction.

There are six main plot lines to experience, which is increased to ten in Summer Pockets Reflection Blue. Four of the six plot lines are initially available in Summer Pockets, and seven of the ten plot lines are initially available in Reflection Blue. Throughout gameplay, the player is given multiple options to choose from, and text progression pauses at these points until a choice is made. Some decisions can lead the game to end prematurely, which offer an alternative ending to the plot. To view all plot lines in their entirety, the player will have to replay the game multiple times and choose different choices to further the plot to an alternate direction. All heroine routes are available when first playing both Summer Pockets and Reflection Blue. In both versions, each heroine will disappear from the game's title screen once her route has been completed. When all of the heroine routes in either version have been played at least once, an additional scenario called Alka is made available. Upon the completion of the Alka route, another scenario called Pocket is made available, which serves as the true conclusion to the story. In Reflection Blue, Umi's route becomes available after the completion of Pocket. In both versions, once Pocket is completed, all heroines reappear on the game's title screen.

There are two minigames featured in Summer Pockets and Reflection Blue. The first is a table tennis minigame that takes the form of a quick time event where the object is to click one of the circular indicators on the player's side at the moment when the ball hits it. Successive hits on any of the indicators will result in the filling of an intensity gauge and will increase the number of indicators from three to five which frequently change position. Successive hits on any one indicator will change its color from blue, to yellow, red, purple, and finally a multicolored "Super Shot!!" indicator. The accuracy of the clicks is scored from good, to great, and finally excellent. Play continues until either the intensity gauge is depleted, resulting in the player's loss, or until the player has accumulated enough points to knock out the opponent. In Reflection Blue, the table tennis minigame now also features doubles matches with the same basic mechanics.

The second minigame is an intricate catching and battling game called Islamon. There are 100 different Islamon to catch in 10 separate locations around the island with 20 kinds of bait. Any bait can be used in any location, but only one to four kinds of Islamon are available per bait, per location. The encounter rate for each Islamon also depends on the bait used in a certain location. For example, using Sugared Water in the Mountains results in a 25% encounter rate for a Cabbage Butterfly, but using the same bait at the Beach results in a 30% encounter rate for the same Islamon. The encounter rates for Islamon range from 5–100% (30 of the 200 permutations have a single Islamon that can be encountered). The player starts with three kinds of bait and three locations to set them. At first, the player can set two traps with bait per day, but this can increase to five per day depending on the player's rank.

A player can battle with their Islamon against an opponent twice per day, with each player allowed to use up to three Islamon per battle. Each Islamon has both a star rating from 1–5 and one of three types—Water, Wind or Earth—where Water beats Wind, Wind beats Earth, and Earth beats Water. Players customize their stock of available Islamon and choose which ones to battle with and in what order, but the rest of the battle occurs automatically. The goal of the battles is to increase in rank among 35 other individuals, and defeating an opponent will result in switching ranks with them. This continues until the player achieves rank 8, and from then on, the player can only gain one rank with each victory. Once the player defeats the players ranked 7 up to 2, the player can then battle the rank 1 opponent as the final boss. Unexpected events can occur during battle based on the relationships certain Islamon have with a given opponent.

== Synopsis ==
Cast
Role	Voice actor
Main
Hairi Takahara (Note: Takahara Hairi (鷹原 羽依里))	Shōya Chiba (RB, anime)
Shiroha Naruse (Note: Naruse Shiroha (鳴瀬 しろは))	Konomi Kohara
Ao Sorakado (Note: Sorakado Ao (空門 蒼))	Natsumi Takamori
Tsumugi Wenders (Note: Tsumugi Vendāsu (紬 ヴェンダース))	Emiri Iwai
Kamome Kushima (Note: Kushima Kamome (久島 鴎))	Tomomi Mineuchi (games); Nene Hieda (anime)
Miki Nomura (Note: Nomura Miki (野村 美希))	Saku Ichimiya
Shizuku Mizuori (Note: Mizuori Shizuku (水織 静久))	Sahomi Koyama
Shiki Kamiyama (Note: Kamiyama Shiki (神山 識)) (Note: New character since Reflection Blue.)	Fairouz Ai
Umi Kato (Note: Katō Umi (加藤 うみ)); Umi Takahara (Note: Takahara Umi (鷹原 羽未)); Nanami	Aimi Tanaka (Umi); Kana Hanazawa (Nanami)
Other
Ryoichi Mitani (Note: Mitani Ryōichi (三谷 良一))	Kentarō Kumagai
Tenzen Kano (Note: Kanō Tenzen (加納 天善))	Yōhei Kamada
Kyoko Misaki (Note: Misaki Kyōko (岬 鏡子))	Megumi Takamoto

Summer Pockets is set on an isolated, rural and peaceful fictional island on the Seto Inland Sea called Torishirojima (Note: (Japanese: 鳥白島)) (based on Naoshima). Among its residents is Umi Takahara, the daughter of Hairi Takahara and Shiroha Takahara (née Naruse). Shiroha possesses a cursed power that foretells her death and dies when giving birth to Umi. Fearing of Umi inheriting Shiroha's cursed power, Hairi takes Umi away from her hometown and forbids any connection with Torishirojima and her mother. This sabotages their bond, yet Umi still manages to sneak on the island and awakens her power, inadvertently travelling through time back to July 2000, when her parents first met.

The game starts in July 2000. Hairi Takahara uses the recent death of his grandmother as an excuse to come to Torishirojima to take care of her estate sale. Once there, he gets to know Shiroha Naruse, who can foretell the future and believes she is cursed and intentionally alienates herself. Besides Shiroha, there are three other girls who are the focus of the story. They include Ao Sorakado, who is pursuing the legends of the island; Kamome Kushima, a high-class girl looking for a pirate ship; and Tsumugi Wenders, a younger girl trying to find herself. Hairi also lives together with Umi under the pseudonym "Umi Kato". Hairi is never assigned the task of estate sale and instead dates the girls. Umi, in the meantime, repeatedly tries to approach her mother Shiroha without success, forcing her to abuse her power and relive the summer multiple times. During this process, her power is waning and she is constantly deteriorating.

After all heroines' routes are completed, the game automatically starts a new iteration of the summer of 2000. Umi's power has been severely weakened such that she can hardly make complete sentences. She insists on playing house with Hairi and Shiroha, on which they agree. Umi's true identity is also exposed to them accidentally. After the summer, Umi's power is depleted and she cannot materialise herself. She watches everything in spiritual form and hopelessly witnesses her mother's death, also discovering that Shiroha is not foreseeing the future. Instead, she is also stuck in a similar time loop that rewinds herself at death, and she is simply having flashbacks of events that happened in past loops. Realising that in order to save her mother she must prevent her from gaining the power in the first place, Umi gathers power from her bloodline and attempts one last rewind to Shiroha's childhood.

Umi arrives in Shiroha's childhood in an alter ego named Nanami. Shiroha has just lost her father in an accident, and her mother simply disappears shortly after. Taking shelter in Shiroha and her grandfather's house, Nanami accompanies Shiroha through her hardest time and successfully prevents her from gaining power. However, such action drastically rewrites the future, putting Umi's very existence at risk. Shiroha ultimately uncovers Nanami's identity, and Umi dissipates in her embrace.

In the new summer, Hairi arrives in Torishirojima to take care of his late grandmother's estate sale, but literally spends the whole summer doing so and fails to develop relationship with anyone. However, at the end of the summer he has a brief flashback of Umi and the past summers. He makes a last-minute decision on the departing ship to meet Shiroha, who later agrees to teach him how to make fried rice. An extended epilogue in Reflection Blue clarifies that afterwards Hairi and Shiroha still become a couple and Umi finally reunites with her parents who are alive.

== Development ==
Before the production of Summer Pockets began, Key was in the process of developing Angel Beats! 1st Beat (2015) and Harmonia (2016). At that time in early 2015, scenario writer Yūto Tonokawa was leading a new project for another visual novel, but this project was postponed to focus on Angel Beats! and Harmonia. Tonokawa later resigned from Key prior to the release of Angel Beats! 1st Beat in June 2015, and the project he was leading was subsequently abandoned. Following this, Kai was brought in to direct a new project, which would later become Summer Pockets. An in-house competition among Visual Arts employees was conducted to submit ideas for the new project as long as it was based around a concept involving an enjoyable, everyday life and a tearful story, but otherwise not being constrained by previous works by Key.

When discussion began regarding Key's new work, Jun Maeda talked it over with Takahiro Baba, the president of Visual Arts, and Maeda was adamant that the new project needed to make readers cry. Maeda went on to say that if their next work could not achieve that, it would mean the end for Key. Among the ideas was one submitted by scenario writer Yū Niijima described as similar to Ghost in the Shell by Kai. Although there were many ideas submitted, it was felt that they were all somewhat lacking as something produced by Key. Maeda admitted that although there were interesting ideas submitted, none of them would make readers cry. Despite Maeda not originally planning to submit an idea himself, he offered one as an example, but he was surprised when his idea was instantly accepted as the basis for what would become Summer Pockets. Maeda decided not to write the scenario for the game due to similarities in themes with Key's visual novel Air (2000), which he primarily wrote.

Kai began expanding on the concept with Maeda sitting in on production meetings, but Maeda was later hospitalized, leading Kai to request that more writers be brought on for the project. Niijima had previously worked on visual novels for Saga Planets, another brand under Visual Arts, but he resigned from Saga Planets in 2012. Baba had suggested on multiple occasions that they bring in Niijima for a new project, leading to him being brought in as a scenario writer. Another scenario writer, Hasama, was added following his contributions to the scenario of the ports of Key's visual novel Kud Wafter (2010). Kai wrote the scenario for Ao's route, Niijima wrote both Shiroha's and Kamome's routes, and Hasama wrote Tsumugi's route.

Although the game is set on a fictional island, it features locations based on real places; the development staff went to Naoshima, Megijima and Ogijima to aid in this process. The use of nostalgia as a theme was important for Kai who likened Maeda's concept to the Boku no Natsuyasumi video game series. In addressing concerns about its similarity to Air, which also features a rural, seaside setting during the summer, Kai noted that Summer Pockets will have a completely different feeling to it due in part to the relationships the heroines have among each other and also from several charming male characters being featured in the game, similar to that of Little Busters! (2007) and Angel Beats! (2010). However, Maeda pointed out that the theme of the maternal bond featured in Air is also included in Summer Pockets.

Na-Ga is the chief artist and character designer for Summer Pockets, and three other artists were later brought in to produce additional character designs: Yūnon Nagayama, Tsubasu Izumi and Fumuyun. Nagayama had previously worked on the character design for Angel Beats! 1st Beat, and she was asked to join the staff for Summer Pockets due to her art being highly compatible with Na-Ga's illustrations. Kai was introduced to Izumi by Harumi Sakurai, the voice of Yuri Nakamura from Angel Beats!, and Kai had wanted to work with Izumi on a project for some time. Fumuyun joined the staff to provide character designs for two supporting characters. Super deformed characters are designed by Engiyoshi. The game's soundtrack was composed by Key's signature composers, Maeda and Shinji Orito, in addition to Donmaru, Tomohiro Takeshita and Ryō Mizutsuki.

=== Marketing and release ===
A nine-episode Internet radio show called Samapoke Kikikomi Radio (サマポケききこみラジオ, Summer Pockets Information Radio) featuring Visual Arts president Takahiro Baba was streamed on YouTube from February 27 to March 26, 2018. Leading up to the release of Summer Pockets, 53 artists drew illustrations of the game's characters and offered comments from March 1 to June 29, 2018, to promote the game. A full-color introductory booklet called Summer Pockets Walker was distributed for free at anime and gaming stores across Japan starting on March 30, 2018. To advertise Summer Pockets, J.I.O Create took a 2007 Honda Stream RSZ and made it into an itasha (a car featuring illustrations of anime-styled characters) with images of the game's heroines. The car was driven around and showcased throughout Japan between May 3 and June 8, 2018. The car was put onto the Japanese Yahoo! Auction website on July 26, 2018, and sold for ¥1,411,000. Illustrator Engiyoshi drew 17 snippets featuring characters from Summer Pockets called Summer Pockets Theater (サマボケ劇場, Samapoke Gekijō) from May 14 to July 5, 2018. A series of 12 short stories were released on the game's website between October 31, 2018, and December 24, 2019, written by the game's scenario writers: Kai, Hasama, and Yū Niijima. The stories, subtitled Natsu no Mabushisa no Naka de (夏の眩しさの中で, In the Middle of a Dazzling Summer), each focus on a separate character and feature illustrations by Fumuyun, one of the game's artists. The stories were later collected into a 144-page book with three additional stories and first sold as part of Visual Arts Winter Fes on December 20, 2020.

Key released a free game demo of Summer Pockets on April 24, 2018, on the game's official website. Summer Pockets was released on June 29, 2018, as a limited-edition version for Windows. The limited edition came bundled with an official guide book titled Torishirojima Kankō Nisshi (鳥白島観光日誌, Torishirojima Sightseeing Journal), a remix album titled Swallow Tale, a rubber coaster, a microfiber cloth, a glow-in-the-dark sticker, and promotional cards from the Weiß Schwarz and Lycèe trading card games. Over two dozen stores in Akihabara and online offered special promotional items if the limited-edition version of the game was bought at their store. These items included telephone cards, tapestries, mousepads, posters, a smartphone stand, and four separate drama CDs. The four drama CDs were later re-released with an additional drama CD titled Summer Pockets Drama CD Collection at Comiket 95 on December 29, 2018.

Summer Pockets was ported to iOS on December 17, 2018, and to Android on December 21, 2018. Prototype released a version on the Nintendo Switch on June 20, 2019. An English version for Windows was released by Visual Arts on February 5, 2020.

=== Reflection Blue ===
An upgraded version of the game titled Summer Pockets Reflection Blue was released on June 26, 2020, for Windows. Two separate editions were released: a limited edition, and a more expensive special edition that comes bundled with more content. Both editions came bundled with an official guide book titled Torishirojima Kankō Nisshi 2 (鳥白島観光日誌2, Torishirojima Sightseeing Journal 2), remix albums, and other promotional items totaling seven in all. The special edition was also bundled with an art book, an acrylic stand, a mini plush toy of Inari, a T-shirt, a necklace, a book jacket, and a Summer Pockets holographic card set. Leading up to its release, 23 artists drew illustrations of the game's characters and offered comments from March 3 to July 2, 2020, to promote the game. There were also five short one-shot manga drawn by separate authors released from June 4–22, 2020.

Originally conceived as a fan disc, Key later decided to release it as a new version of the game with various additions, and it is made by the same staff as the original game. Reflection Blue has four additional routes: two heroine routes for Miki Nomura and Shizuku Mizuori from Summer Pockets, a route for the new heroine Shiki Kamiyama, and a separate route for Umi Kato. Kai wrote the scenario for Miki's, Umi's and Shiki's routes, and Hasama wrote Shizuku's story. There are also new everyday life scenarios featuring the characters interacting and having fun together, and this includes an upgrade to the table tennis minigame. A 224-page art book titled Summer Pockets Visual Fanbook was released on May 24, 2019, by Visual Arts. The art book contains story summaries of the game's scenarios, information on the cast of characters, interviews from the production staff, and illustrations featuring art from the game. A 352-page revised edition of the art book with additional content from Reflection Blue titled Summer Pockets Reflection Blue Visual Fanbook was released on February 25, 2022, by Visual Arts.

Reflection Blue was ported to Android on August 20, 2020, and to iOS on April 27, 2021. Prototype released a version on the Nintendo Switch on July 1, 2021, and followed with a PlayStation 4 port on July 21, 2022. Reflection Blue was released by Visual Arts on June 27, 2025, on Steam with Japanese, English and Simplified Chinese text support.

== Music ==
Summer Pockets has seven pieces of theme music: one opening theme, three ending themes, and three insert songs played during gameplay. The main opening theme is "Alkatale" (アルカテイル, Arukateiru) sung by Konomi Suzuki. The main ending theme is "Lasting Moment" sung by Suzuki, the ending theme for the Alka route is "Hane no Yurikago" (羽のゆりかご) sung by Runa Mizutani of the dōjin music group NanosizeMir, and the grand finale ending theme is "Pocket o Fukuramasete" (ポケットをふくらませて) sung by Rionos. The three insert songs include "Tsumugi no Natsuyasumi" (紬の夏休み) sung by Emiri Iwai, "Shiroha no Komoriuta" (しろはの子守歌) sung by Konomi Kohara, and "Yasōka" (夜奏花) sung by Yurika. Six of the main characters from Summer Pockets have background music leitmotifs—the original four heroines, plus Umi Kato and Ai Sorakado. Shiroha's themes are "White Loneliness" and "White with You"; Ao's theme is "Other side Blue"; Kamome's theme is "Adventure for Black"; Tsumugi's theme is "Golden Hours"; Umi's theme is "Twinkle of Alcor"; lastly, Ai's theme is "Deep Blue Blue".

Summer Pockets Reflection Blue has several more pieces of theme music in addition to those previously featured in Summer Pockets. The opening theme is "Asterlore" (アスタロア, Asutaroa) sung by Suzuki. "Aoki Konata" (青き此方) sung by Yurika is used as the ending theme for Shiki's route, and the grand finale ending theme is "Pocket o Fukuramasete (Sea, You Again)" (ポケットをふくらませて 〜Sea, You Again〜) sung by Rionos. There are five more inserts songs featured during gameplay: "Natsu no Sunadokei" (夏の砂時計) sung by Mizutani, "Natsu ni Kimi o Machinagara" (夏に君を待ちながら) sung by Kohara used during Shiroha's route, "Hiyoku no Chōtachi" (比翼の蝶たち) sung by Natsumi Takamori used during Ao's route, and both "Departure!" and "With" sung by Tomomi Mineuchi used during Kamome's route. Five leitmotifs were added for the four additional heroines in Reflection Blue. Umi's themes include "Piece of Clear" and "Twinkle of Aster"; Miki's theme is "Splash Green"; Shizuku's theme is "Tender Purple"; finally, Shiki's theme is "Run Red Run".

The single for "Alkatale" was released in March 2018. As with several of Key's previous works, a music album came bundled with the limited-edition release of the game; the album, released in June 2018, is titled Swallow Tale and contains remixes of eight tracks of the game's music. The Summer Pockets Original Soundtrack was released in September 2018. Two albums were released at Comiket 95 in December 2018: an image song album titled Sing! and a remix album titled Summer Session: Hito Natsu no Bōken. Two more remix albums followed in 2019: Seven's Sea in April, and Echoes of Summer in July. The single for "Asterlore" was released in April 2020. The remix album Edain came bundled with the limited and special editions version of Reflection Blue released in June 2020 and contains remixes of eight tracks of the game's music. Another remix album titled Summer Chronicle was released in August 2020 featuring tracks from Air, Kud Wafter and Summer Pockets. The single "Asterlore / Aoki Konata / Natsu no Sunadokei" was released in September 2020 containing theme music from Reflection Blue. Two more albums were released in December 2020: another image song album titled Sing! 2, and the Summer Pockets Reflection Blue Original Soundtrack. Each of the singles and albums released were on Key's record label Key Sounds Label.

== Adaptations ==
=== Manga ===
A spin-off manga series illustrated by Yūnon Nagayama and centering on Tsumugi Wenders, titled Summer Pockets Mugyu Days: Tsumugi no Shima Sanpo (Summer Pockets むぎゅでいず〜紬の島さんぽ〜, Summer Pockets Mugiyudeizu: Tsumugi no Shima Sanpo), began serialization in ASCII Media Works' Dengeki Moeoh magazine and on Kadokawa Corporation's KadoComi website on February 28, 2025.

A manga adaptation of the original visual novel and its anime adaptation was announced at AnimeJapan 2025. Titled Summer Pockets: Natsu no Takaramono (Summer Pockets ーなつのたからものー) and illustrated by wogura, it began serialization on Shueisha's Tonari no Young Jump website on May 30, 2025.

=== Anime ===
An anime adaptation was announced to be "in production" during the "Key Channel 2-Hour Special: Lunaria Feature #2 & Staff Year-End" livestream on December 29, 2021. It was later confirmed to be a television series produced by Feel and directed by Tomoki Kobayashi, with Keiichirō Ōchi handling series composition, Mai Ōtsuka designing the characters, and the composers from the visual novel reprising their roles as music composers alongside Shūhei Ōhashi. The cast from the visual novel are reprising their roles with Nene Hieda replacing Tomomi Mineuchi. The 26-episode series ran for two consecutive cours, airing from April 7 to September 29, 2025, on Tokyo MX and other networks.. The opening theme song is "Alkatale", while the ending theme song is "Lasting Moment", both performed by Konomi Suzuki, which were previously featured as main theme songs for the visual novel. From episode 18 onward, the opening theme song is "Finisteller" (フィニステラー) performed by Suzuki, while the ending theme song is "Mahō no Enikki" (魔法の絵日記) performed by Konomi Kohara and Aimi Tanaka. Crunchyroll is streaming the series. Tropics Entertainment licensed the series in Southeast Asia for streaming on the Tropics Anime Asia YouTube channel.

==== Episodes ====
No.	Title	Directed by (Note: Production staff information is taken from the ending credits of each episode.)	Written by	Storyboarded by	Original release date
1	"Welcome to Torishirojima Island"; Transliteration: "Torishirojima e Yōkoso" (Japanese: 鳥白島へようこそ)	Taichi Yoshizawa	Keiichirō Ōchi	Tomoki Kobayashi	April 7, 2025
Takahara Hairi arrives at Torishirojima island to help his aunt Kyouko sort through his late grandmother's belongings over summer break. Calling himself a "wounded bird of passage," he feels a strange sense of déjà vu upon arrival. One night, lost on his scooter, he meets a girl named Shiroha at the school pool. She gives him directions home, ending with the word "dosukoi," which he later learns expresses annoyance. The next day, Hairi meets more people: Umi, his cousin; a sleepy girl with a pet; and two others in a "shirtless hunt." That night, a package from home arrives with his belongings, including a photo of his swim team. This prompts him to return to the pool, where he finds Shiroha practicing. He offers her swimming tips before heading off, deepening their connection.
2	"How to Spend Your Summer Vacation"; Transliteration: "Natsu-yasumi no Sugoshi Kata" (Japanese: 夏休みの過ごし方)	Takafumi Fujii	Keiichirō Ōchi	Minoru Ōhara	April 14, 2025
Hairi gets the day off from his aunt Kyouko and explores more of Torishirojima. He runs into Shiroha at the pier, who thanks him for the swimming tips. At a shrine, he spots a girl atop a lighthouse humming a song, saying she's "looking for herself." He meets more locals: Miki (the "shirtless hunter"), Ryouichi, mountain-dweller Tenzen, and Ao, the sleepy girl from earlier — all island youth group executives. Hairi also hears Shiroha tends to avoid others, with Ao warning him not to get involved. The next day, he buys shaved ice at a roadside shop, only to stumble into a half-dressed Ao and spill the dessert on her. To make up for it, he lets her do the same to him, sparking a playful ice fight. That night, reflecting in the bath, Hairi admits he came to the island to escape. While wandering, he finds a secluded beach and meets Shiroha again. They talk about the ferry ride, her watching birds, and his reason for coming—to relive the feeling of an endless, joyful summer from childhood. Shiroha, having heard from her grandmother about him mending his "broken wings," finds the idea strange but intriguing.
3	"Pirate Ship and Girl"; Transliteration: "Kaizoku-sen to Shōjo" (Japanese: 海賊船と少女)	Zi Hang Mo	Keiichirō Ōchi	Tomoki Kobayashi & Yasushi Muroya	April 21, 2025
Hairi, urged by Umi to stop lazing around, heads to the island reservoir and finds Shiroha playing a game. Embarrassed at being caught, she storms off. On the way back, he meets a strange girl whose suitcase is stuck in a storm drain. She somehow knows his name and introduces herself as Kushima Kamome. After helping her out, Kamome rides her suitcase as Hairi pushes it, singing a sea shanty. They run into Umi, who warns Kamome not to go down a hill—Kamome does anyway and splashes into the sea. Hairi tries to save her but is haunted by flashbacks of a past swimming failure and ends up needing rescue instead. Kamome thanks him anyway and mentions she visited the island long ago during a summer camp. After bumping into Shiroha again, Kamome then takes Hairi to the elementary school attic, where she retrieves a treasure chest, a notebook, and a pirate flag—remnants of a childhood adventure she planned with a friend ten years ago. As Hairi pushes her suitcase toward the port, Kamome, calling him a good guy, promises an even greater adventure ahead.
4	"One Summer's Treasure"; Transliteration: "Hito Natsu no Takaramono" (Japanese: ひと夏の宝物)	Shōta Imai	Keiichirō Ōchi	Yoshihiro Hiramine	April 28, 2025
Hairi reunites with Kamome, who shows him a locked treasure box from the school attic and a notebook containing clues to find the keys. They find the first key at a shrine, the second at a crematorium doghouse, and the third in a chicken coop at Shiroha's home—requiring a disguise to get past her grumpy grandfather. Hairi finds the final key in a bird's nest but injures himself. Kamome cares for him until he recovers, and they open the box together. Inside is a map to a pirate ship—the true "treasure" from Kamome's childhood summer camp. Her old friends never returned, but Kamome is determined to find the ship again.
5	"Higeneko Adventure"; Transliteration: "Higeneko-dan no Bōken" (Japanese: ひげ猫団の冒険)	Shinichi Tatsuta, Yuri Pinzon & Elijah Ragas	Keiichirō Ōchi	Hidetoshi Yoshida	May 5, 2025
Kamome and Hairi journey to find the pirate ship, triggering strange flashbacks in Hairi that mirror Kamome's memories. Camping near the entrance to a cave, he dreams of a girl using a suitcase to hide her weak legs—clearly resembling Kamome. As the trip continues, he realizes she shares that same hidden pain. Kamome opens up about her health, and Hairi shares his reason for coming to the island: to escape guilt over letting down his swim team. They bond over their struggles. When Kamome falls into an underground stream, Hairi saves her, and they finally reach the pirate ship. Though her friends never arrived, Kamome is content to be there with Hairi and asks him never to forget their adventure.
6	"Across the Seven Seas"; Transliteration: "Nanatsu no Umi o Koete" (Japanese: 七つの海を越えて)	Taichi Yoshizawa	Keiichirō Ōchi	Satoshi Shimizu	May 12, 2025
After Kamome vanishes at the pirate ship, Hairi somehow remembers his past and gathers friends to recover her suitcase. He rediscovers a book about a girl's lonely childhood and her dream of leading a pirate crew, the Higenekos--a book he read as a kid. Visiting her private island home, he learns from her mother, Sagi, the real owner of Kamome's suitcase, that she had fallen into a coma in Finland before summer. The pirate ship and story were part of her plan to make friends. Inspired, Hairi and the others restore the ship, as he writes to all those who wrote letters to her. He dreams of Kamome, who smiles knowing her dream came true. Raising a new Higeneko flag in the presence of the friends Kamome made, Hairi promises they'll meet again in ten years, as summer—and Umi—fades away.
7	"The Lighthouse, the Song and the Girl"; Transliteration: "Tōdai to Uta to Shōjo" (Japanese: 灯台と歌と少女)	Zi Hang Mo	Yasunori Yamada	Royden Shimazu	May 19, 2025
A few days after arriving on the island, Hairi meets Tsumugi, a mysterious girl atop a lighthouse searching for her purpose. Along with the quirky Shizuku, they bond over beach adventures and shared feelings of being lost. Tsumugi hums a song she can't name, which becomes a symbol of her search for identity. As they grow closer, she reveals she must leave soon for a faraway place, but Hairi promises to spend the rest of the summer with her, making memories before she's gone.
8	"Looking for Things to Do"; Transliteration: "Yaritai Koto Sagashi" (Japanese: やりたいこと探し)	Shinichi Tatsuta, Yuri Pinzon & Elijah Ragas	Yasunori Yamada	Satoshi Shimizu	May 26, 2025
Hairi spends his summer with Tsumugi and Shizuku, hoping to make Tsumugi happy before she leaves. As their bond grows, Shizuku teases Hairi about falling in love, which he denies—but it flusters Tsumugi. Together, they enjoy lighthearted adventures, including building chip can towers (with help from the youth of the island) and searching for the mysterious song Tsumugi hums. With help from an old German nursery rhyme songbook in Kyouko's warehouse, they find the tune and decide to write their own lyrics. Later, Tsumugi confesses her love to Hairi, and he returns her feelings. That night, Hairi discovers an old photo of Tsumugi—on the day she mysteriously vanished.
9	"Tsumugi and Tsumugi"; Transliteration: "Tsumugi to Tsumugi" (Japanese: 紬とツムギ)	Shōta Imai	Yasunori Yamada	Shōta Imai	June 2, 2025
Shizuku grows concerned when Tsumugi disappears for an unusually long time. As Hairi searches for her, they uncover an old story about a blonde girl who vanished decades ago—Tsumugi. Only the old storekeeper and Katou-san—revealed to be Tsumugi's only human friend who recently passed away—knows of her being spirited away. Clues lead them to an abandoned house and Tsumugi's diary, revealing her loneliness, a forbidden love with the lighthouse keeper, her mysterious disappearance, and an entry added by someone so as to make sure no one forgets about her. Hairi rushes to the lighthouse and is transported to a strange realm where he finds Tsumugi, who doesn't remember him. She's trapped there by her lingering regrets. Though he urges her to return, she refuses, asking him to care for the Tsumugi in his world. Hairi escapes and wakes up to find both Shizuku and Tsumugi in tears worried sick—he's been missing for a day. Tsumugi has returned, and Hairi promises to stay by her side until the last day of summer vacation.
10	"A Lifetime's Worth of Summer Breaks"; Transliteration: "Isshō-bun no Natsuya-sumi" (Japanese: 一生分の夏休み)	Taichi Yoshizawa	Yasunori Yamada	Tomoki Kobayashi	June 9, 2025
In the last week of summer, Hairi and Shizuku vow to stay by Tsumugi's side, filling her days with joy and ending with a birthday party on August 31. Tsumugi gifts them keys to the lighthouse and confesses her wish to remain with them forever. That night, after a candlelit surprise, she reveals her truth: she replaced the original Tsumugi who vanished, staying behind so she'd never be forgotten, until finding love and happiness with Hairi and Shizuku. At midnight, she disappears, leaving only a teddy bear with Hairi's ribbon. The next day, Shizuku reflects that Tsumugi was her summer itself. Soon after, a new girl arrives singing Tsumugi's song, and Hairi promises to meet her again next summer. In another world, Umi bids farewell as she brings the bear to the lighthouse. A year later, Hairi and Shizuku return, awaiting Tsumugi once more.
11	"The Summer Butterfly and the Night Girl"; Transliteration: "Natsu no Chō to Yoru no Shōjo" (Japanese: 夏の蝶と夜の少女)	Shinichi Tatsuta, Yuri Pinzon & Elijah Ragas	Kai	Satoshi Shimizu	June 16, 2025
While exploring the island, Hairi meets Sorakado Ao, a quirky girl he first finds sleeping under a tree. They officially meet at a youth group welcome party, where she's revealed to be a member. The next day, Umi accidentally calls Hairi "Dad," hinting at a deeper bond. Later, Hairi awkwardly catches Ao undressing at the store, spilling shaved ice on her—an encounter she oddly seems to enjoy. At a festival planning meeting, Ao's playful, perverted nature emerges, and Hairi is asked to keep an eye on her due to her busy schedule. One night, after Ao misses work for a checkup, Hairi finds something flickering on the side of the mountain. Investigating, he finds Ao interacting with glowing butterflies on the mountain. When she finds out he's been quietly observing her, she's surprised he can see the Shichieichou too.
12	"Priestess of Sorakado"; Transliteration: "Sorakado no Miko" (Japanese: 空門の巫女)	Zi Hang Mo, Taichi Yoshizawa, Shinichi Tatsuta & Shōta Imai	Kai	Satoshi Shimizu	June 23, 2025
Hairi investigates Ao's strange behavior and learns from Shiroha about the island's Three Houses, with only the Sorakado family (Ao's) still performing secret mountain rituals. Curious, Hairi disobeys Ao's warning and climbs the mountain, where he sees the glowing butterflies called Shichieichou—lingering memories of people with unfinished business. Touching one gives him a painful vision, and Ao rescues him. She explains her duty is to guide these spirits, and she's searching for one special memory—belonging to her comatose sister, Ai. Hairi offers to help, confessing he has feelings for her. They grow closer as he joins her on the mountain and learns about the Mayoi Tachibana, a sacred family tree that allows Ao to perform the guiding ritual. Later, Hairi visits Ai with Ao and introduces himself to her as her boyfriend. He promises to wait for her and help find Ai's memory. He also discovers his aunt owns a book about the Shichieichou, possibly holding the answers they need. The next day, as he wakes up, Hairi noticed a Shichieichou floating near Umi. Just then, Ao arrives to see the book, which she can actually read. There, she finds out a way to return a Shichieichou to a sleeping body.
13	"A Pair of Butterflies"; Transliteration: "Hiyoku no Chō-tachi" (Japanese: 比翼の蝶たち)	Zi Hang Mo	Kai	Kaori	June 30, 2025
Hairi continues helping Ao search for her sister Ai's lost memory, even as time runs out—the sacred Mayoi Tachibana tree's flowers are falling, signaling the end of the season when Shichieichou can be gathered. Ao reveals the emotional toll the task takes on her, and how Ai's coma was caused indirectly by her. As children, Ao saw her first Shichieichou, but no one believed her. When she tried searching for one alone that night, she panicked, and, Ai went to find her. Misunderstanding Ai's concern, Ao rejected her and ran away. Ai fell off a cliff while looking for a Shichieichou and has been comatose ever since, clutching Ao's charm. Ao has lived with the guilt of never getting to apologize. After Hairi reassures her with his love, Ao is briefly uplifted. But things turn dire again when the clinic calls—Ai's condition has worsened. Ao pushes herself to exhaustion gathering memories, and Hairi finds her passed out. While Ao is resting, Shichieichou appear again, but Hairi protects Ao from them touching her—until one persistent butterfly remains: Ai's memory. Ao is unable to see Ai's Shichieichou all along because she closed herself to Ai. Hairi helps Ao connect with Ai's memory through a kiss, finally allowing her to see what Ai truly felt—that she never doubted Ao, and deeply cared for her. With the truth revealed, Ao brings Ai's memories back, though Ai has yet to awaken. Hairi then watches over Ai as Ao sleeps beside her older sister.
14	"Dawn Memories"; Transliteration: "Yoake no kioku" (Japanese: 夜明けの記憶)	Shinichi Tatsuta, Yuri Pinzon & Elijah Ragas	Kai	Keiichiro Kawaguchi	July 7, 2025
Ao awakens to the touch of her sister Ai, who has miraculously recovered from her coma. Ai meets Hairi and, despite some teasing, approves of his relationship with Ao. Her recovery becomes big news on the island, while Ao, now exhausted, falls into a deep sleep. When Ao doesn't wake up for two days, Hairi and Ai suspect the Shichieichou are affecting her—she may need time to process all the memories she absorbed. Hairi is encouraged to speak to her, and expresses his admiration for her strength. Meanwhile, he tries guiding the memory butterflies himself and notices the sacred Mayoi Tachibana tree is nearly bare of blossoms—the ritual, along with his summer vacation, is ending. Ao finally wakes, revealing she is still overwhelmed by the voices of lingering memories. Knowing she won't stay awake for long, Hairi carries her up the mountain for one last "date." At twilight, surrounded by fluttering Shichieichou, they reach the tree. Inari alerts Hairi as the memories leave her, but one butterfly—Ao's own memory—escapes. Hairi catches it and relives all their moments together. As Ao sleeps again, Hairi promises to return every weekend, and to find her Shichieichou next summer. Umi brings Ao's memory to the tree and quietly vanishes. Though asleep, Ao hears Hairi's voice each visit—the voice she loves—waiting for the day she can greet him with "Good morning."
15	"The Girl Who Forgot Summer Vacation"; Transliteration: "Natsuyasumi o wasureta shōjo" (Japanese: 夏休みを忘れた少女)	Shōta Imai	Takashi Aoshima	Shōta Imai	July 14, 2025
While exploring the island, Shiroha overhears kids mention Grandma Kido's words about "a champion coming to heal his broken fist." That night, she first meets Hairi when he gets lost near her swimming practice at the school pool. He worries about her swimming alone, but she coldly brushes him off with "dosukoi." He returns the next night, and gives her some swimming advice. The next day, Shiroha runs into Hairi again when Ao invites her to his welcome party. She thanks him for the swimming tips but keeps her distance. Despite this, they talk alone by the beach, where she realizes Hairi came to the island to heal his past wounds and rediscover a lost summer — feelings she quietly relates to. They keep bumping into each other: fishing, sharing watermelon ice cream, and getting tangled in silly misunderstandings with Ao and Miki. Shiroha pretends she doesn't enjoy it but warms up to Hairi's company. When she collapses from heat exhaustion while fishing, Hairi carries her home, proving he cares. Through Tenzen and Ryouichi, Hairi learns Shiroha has been avoided since childhood due to superstitions tied to her shrine-keeping family and a rumor she brings misfortune. Still, her old friends see her acting like her old self again with Hairi around. They ask him to stay by her side — and he agrees.
16	"Not A Date"; Transliteration: "Dēto janai" (Japanese: デートじゃない)	Takafumi Fujii	Takashi Aoshima	Minoru Ōhara	July 21, 2025
Shiroha visits Hairi's place to thank him but keeps her distance due to her "curse." They spend time together helping the island's youth group raise money for Tenzen's broken table tennis table, but when Tokuda, the sports store's owner, refused payment for the table out of gratitude to Shiroha's family, it ends up funding a day out together on the mainland. When they got home, Shiroha panics after seeing the latest Natsutori Festival poster — she has visions of dying at the festival and sees someone resembling Hairi falling off a cliff and drowning with her, which explains why she is learning how to swim. Hairi reveals he fled to the island after failing his swim team but refuses to leave now. Despite Shiroha's warnings, he vows to stay and protect her. When they visit her grandfather, he challenges Hairi to prove he's worthy of guarding Shiroha during the festival, as she is the priestess of the festival's ritual.
17	"Summer Bird Ritual"; Transliteration: "Natsu no tori no gishiki" (Japanese: 夏の鳥の儀式)	Shinichi Tatsuta & Taichi Yoshizawa	Takashi Aoshima	Hidetoshi Yoshida	July 28, 2025
Hairi passes Shiroha's grandfather's underwater test, earning his trust to protect her. To accompany her as priestess, they must "marry" symbolically — a condition that pleases Umi. Hairi prepares for the ritual and learns from friends how to help Shiroha survive if she drowns. The night before, Shiroha goes missing (and Ao, the Sorakado mountain priestess, hilariously sitting in for her), fearing her visions. Hairi finds her at the usual spot and reassures her, and she shares her wish to live for the future. During the ritual's "wedding" and boat ceremony, a storm struck and a missing girl named Hotta triggers Shiroha's vision: she drowns saving the girl. Hairi rescues Shiroha, experiences a cryptic moment about fate through a voice from who identified itself as "The Weavers of Time," telling him it is futile to try escaping it. He is guided back by rainbow butterflies. Afterward, Hairi comforts Shiroha about her powers, confesses his feelings, and she reciprocates. Just as he tries to leave, the boat returns due to trouble — bringing them back unexpectedly together. Meanwhile, Umi stands by the sacred tree, thinking there will be a next time.
18	"One More Summer Vacation"; Transliteration: "Mō hitotsu no natsuyasumi" (Japanese: もうひとつの夏休み)	Taichi Yoshizawa, Tomoki Kobayashi, & Satoshi Saga	Keiichirō Ōchi	Yoshihiro Hiramine	August 4, 2025
Kyouko, guided by the shichieichou named "Hitomi," is asked to watch over Umi and Hairi. Hairi arrives on the island to sort his grandmother's collection, where he and Umi soon meet the aloof Shiroha at a school pool. While exploring the island and bonding with locals, Hairi struggles to cook for Umi, leading him to Shiroha, who shares her cooking skills. Umi's longing for family inspires Hairi to suggest "playing house." After comforting Umi during a lonely night, he convinces Shiroha to join as their "mom." Despite initial shyness, the three form a close bond, recording their summer memories in a magic diary as Umi joyfully calls Shiroha "Mom."
19	"Magic Picture Diary"; Transliteration: "Mahō enikki" (Japanese: 魔法絵日記)	Zi Hang Mo	Yasunori Yamada	Minoru Ōhara	August 11, 2025
Umi enjoys a lively summer with Hairi, Shiroha, and friends, but Shiroha grows uneasy about acting as her "mom" when Umi's uncanny diary predictions reveal she knows future events, leading Shiroha to flee in fear of the curse she has, but feels sad for her. Hairi learns Umi is from the future, having the ability to time travel. She formerly lived on the island with her parents, but her father took her away. She came to the island for one last summer to meet her, wanting to experience the same summer her father told her once, and believing her father resents her for her mother's death. A rainbow butterfly saved her from a fall, causing the summer to repeat endlessly. She considers this to be her final summer as she feels her powers fading. Hairi scolds himself for being a horrible father, but Umi thinks otherwise, given all the summers she spent with him, and is glad that he is her father. Hairi, even if caught by surprise by the events, and pondering on her lonely journey, vows to make her summer unforgettable.
20	"Marriage"; Transliteration: "Kekkon" (Japanese: 結婚)	Shinichi Tatsuta & Taichi Yoshizawa	Takashi Aoshima	Shinichi Tatsuta	August 18, 2025
Hairi presses Shiroha about her "curse," learning she can foresee a future where those close to her are taken away, likely during the Natsudori festival ritual. Despite her warnings, Hairi vows to protect her. Umi shows a letter from her mother that she cannot read anymore — stating that, when sad, she should not be afraid to reach out. With her happiness as his reason, they talk to Shiroha's grandfather, who tests Hairi in a traditional island underwater duel. Guided by a rainbow butterfly, Hairi overcomes his fear and wins, earning permission to stay by Shiroha's side, and leading to each other confessing. Shiroha's grandfather, shocked when Umi calls them "Mom," "Dad," and "Grandfather," then considers the two married. As the festival nears, Hairi, Shiroha, and Umi stay close to each other; and the festival rituals went with no incident—until her vision reveals Umi on the ritual boat, and, as the rain sets in, exposed to danger.
21	"Footprints in the Waves"; Transliteration: "Nami no naka no ashiato" (Japanese: 波の中の足跡)	Shōta Imai	Keiichirō Ōchi	Satoshi Shimizu	August 25, 2025
Hairi and Shiroha save Umi during the ritual, breaking Shiroha's curse and deepening their bond with a real first kiss. As summer goes on, however, Umi begins to fade—friends forget her, even Hairi briefly does, and she regresses to a childlike state. Determined to give her lasting memories with Shiroha, Hairi plans for the fireworks festival as a final gift. On their first date, he remembers their true goal: making Umi's summer with her mother unforgettable. That night, as they rest together, Shiroha reads the ending of the picture book—while Umi's rainbow butterfly quietly departs her body.
22	"Towards That Summer"; Transliteration: "Ano natsu ni mukatte" (Japanese: あの夏に向かって)	Kaori	Yasunori Yamada	Kaori	September 2, 2025
Hairi and Shiroha wake with no memory of Umi until a rainbow paper plane and the fireworks bring her back to mind. Umi appears one last time, thanking them for the summer before vanishing with the final firework. The next year, Hairi and Shiroha marry, and she later becomes pregnant—but her visions return, revealing why Umi sought her. Shiroha's research to end her power exhausts her, and she dies after childbirth, leaving the letter Umi would one day read. Grief drives future Umi to restart the loop without herself in it, creating a new cycle where Shiroha is trapped by her fate, until she chooses to disappear entirely to break it.
23	"Nanami"; Transliteration: "Nanami" (Japanese: ななみ)	Shinichi Tatsuta & Taichi Yoshizawa	Takashi Aoshima	Keiichiro Kawaguchi	September 8, 2025
Umi, now fragmented as a shichieichou, wakes up in a chicken coop with no memories and is taken in by Naruse Kobato and his granddaughter, a shy young Shiroha. Given the name Nanami, she slowly bonds with them, especially through cooking "fried fan" (fried rice) just like Shiroha's late father once made. Together, they search the island for special ingredients tied to Shiroha's parents' past, rekindling Shiroha's joy. Along the way, Nanami learns pieces of island lore, including one told by Kyouko, the closest friend of Shiroha's mother, the tale of Shirohane—a woman who becomes a butterfly to join her beloved by sacrificing herself to the sea god. Flashes of her past haunt her, as Nanami chooses to stay by Shiroha's side, determined to bring her happiness even without her lost memories.
24	"Where The Sunshine Is"; Transliteration: "Taiyō no hikari ga kagayaku basho" (Japanese: 太陽の光が輝く場所)	Zi Hang Mo	Yasunori Yamada	Royden Shimazu	September 15, 2025
Nanami swears to protect Shiroha's smile, but memories resurface when, upon trying it, the fried rice they made tastes like her father's recipe. Tasting the fried rice they made, Kobato warns against clinging to the past, revealing of their family's power that comes at a cost—something Hitomi also carried, wanting to make sure Shiroha enjoys her summers before vanishing. Nanami's shichieichou appears to her, reminding her of her mission to help her loved ones. Shiroha dreams again of her parents fading away, guided by a rainbow butterfly. Learning of a lantern-making class for the Natsudori Festival, Nanami hopes to recreate Shiroha's happy memory, but, at school, Shiroha rejects it, runs off, and crying and showing how she misses her parents, eventually finding herself at their house, where she eventually meets Katou-san. Katou reveals Hitomi cherished Shiroha and shared the same power, urging her to believe in her mother and live joyful summers. Shiroha recalls telling her mother about a butterfly dream before she vanished, just as Nanami finally catches up to her after Shiroha's friends stopped her, thinking she is bullying her.
25	"Memories of the Future"; Transliteration: "Mirai no Omoide" (Japanese: 未来の思い出)	Takafumi Fujii	Keiichirō Ōchi	Minoru Ohara	September 22, 2025
Shiroha isolates herself, while Nanami seeks guidance from Kyouko about the Shirohane legend—granting freedom across time but risking entrapment. Nanami realizes she can't deny Shiroha's wish to see her mother, but tries to distract her during the Natsudori Festival. Shiroha, guided by a rainbow butterfly, reaches the tree where her mother came to go to the past and prepares to use her power. Nanami warns she'll lose her present bonds and insists her mother Hitomi never abandoned her. Showing her own shichieichou, Nanami helps Shiroha return, but begins to vanish—her true identity revealed as Umi, Shiroha's future daughter. The young Shiroha transforms into her adult form and acknowledges her, telling her the future might be altered by being there, as she gave her the powers to grant her wishes. Nanami knew the risk of her actions, saying she cherishes the summer they shared with Hairi. Umi then finally get to say "Good morning"--words she did not have the chance to say the day she disappeared.
26	"Pockets Stuffed Full"; Transliteration: "Poketto-ippai" (Japanese: ポケットいっぱい)	Tomoki Kobayashi	Keiichirō Ōchi	Tomoki Kobayashi	September 29, 2025
Umi, her powers dried up, collapsed in Shiroha's lap, knowing well that it is because of what she did. However, she is happy, getting to meet her and spending a lifetime's worth of summers together. Umi vanishes as Shiroha hummed the song Umi heard while in her womb and as an infant. In a following flashback, Shiroha finds out--beside a sleeping Umi--that Hairi actually added more to the story picturebook Umi made to liven the otherwise sad ending. A new summer arrives and Hairi comes to the island to help out with his grandmother's collection, which he would later accomplish with her aunt Kyouko. However, he does not interact with the girls he encounter, aside from when Hairi eats dinner at the Naruse Diner, where he had fried rice, unconsciously recommended by its white-haired waitress. Just then, at the end of the task, he spaces out to see flashbacks of past summers and a familiar girl who he instinctively called "Umi." Hairi goes home afterward, where he finally meets some of the youth of the island--one of them remembering seeing him at the start of summer. As Hairi departs aboard the ferry, he sees the white-haired girl at the pier throwing a rainbow-colored paper plane to the sky. He then remembers that he came to the island to remember something. He literally jumps off the ship and swim back to port, and asks the girl to teach him how to make the fried rice he had before, to which she agrees.

== Reception ==
Summer Pockets premiered as the No. 1 game sold on Getchu.com, a major redistributor of visual novel and domestic anime products, during the month of its release, and at No. 4 in July. It was later ranked as the No. 3 game sold on Getchu.com for the entirety of 2018. It was also the No. 1 most sold computer game on the Japanese Amazon for 12 consecutive weeks (excluding when it was sold out). Summer Pockets Reflection Blue occupied the top two spots for games sold on Getchu.com during the month of its release for the limited and special edition versions, and was ranked at No. 13 in July. It was later ranked as the No. 2 and 19 game sold (depending on the version). Reflection Blue occupied the top two spots for computer games sold in Japan during the week of June 22–28, 2020. Reflection Blue would go on to be ranked as the No. 3, 6 and 7 most sold computer games in 2020 (depending on the version) in Japan.

In the 2018 Bishōjo Game Awards sponsored by Getchu.com, Summer Pockets was ranked as No. 1 in the comprehensive, scenario, music, and demo movie categories, along with being ranked as No. 2 in the graphics category, No. 2 and 14 in the character category for Shiroha and Kamome, and ranked as No. 7 for the game system. In the 2020 Bishōjo Game Awards, Reflection Blue was ranked as No. 1 in the music category, along with being ranked as No. 2 in the demo movie category, No. 4 in the scenario category, No. 5 in both the comprehensive category and the character category for Shiki, and ranked as No. 6 for the game system. In the 2018 Moe Game Awards, Summer Pockets was awarded both the Grand Prize, the User Approval Award, and the Monthly Award for June 2018. In the 2020 Moe Game Awards, Reflection Blue was awarded the Best Theme Song Award for "Asterlore", and the Monthly Award for June 2020. The Nintendo Switch port of Reflection Blue in 2021 was reviewed by the Japanese video game magazine Famitsu, which gave it an overall score of 32/40 (out of the four individual review scores of 8, 8, 8, and 8).
