= Slow Start (manga) =

Japanese manga and anime series

- First volume cover, featuring (from top to bottom): Tamate Momochi, Hana Ichinose, Kamuri Sengoku, and Eiko Tokura

スロウスタート (Surou Sutāto)
- Genre: Comedy; Slice of life
- Manga
- Written by: Yuiko Tokumi
- Published by: Houbunsha
- Magazine: Manga Time Kirara
- Original run: June 2013 – present
- Volumes: 14
- Anime television series
- Directed by: Hiroyuki Hashimoto
- Written by: Mio Inoue
- Music by: Yoshiaki Fujisawa
- Studio: CloverWorks (Note: The anime adaptation was originally credited to A-1 Pictures. However, the credit was transferred to CloverWorks after their separation from the studio in October 2018.)
- Licensed by: NA: Aniplex of America; SEA: Medialink
- Original network: Tokyo MX, GYT, GTV, BS11, TVA, Kansai TV
- Original run: January 7, 2018 – March 25, 2018
- Episodes: 12

Slow Start (スロウスタート, Surou Sutāto) is a Japanese four-panel manga series by Yuiko Tokumi, serialized in Houbunsha's seinen manga magazine Manga Time Kirara since June 2013. It has been collected into fourteen tankōbon volumes. A 12-episode anime television series adaptation by CloverWorks aired between January 7 and March 25, 2018.

== Premise ==
Following an unfortunately timed case of the mumps, middle school student Hana Ichinose ends up missing all of her high school exams. Unable to stay in her hometown, Hana moves into her cousin's apartment building and spends a gap year as a "middle school rōnin", before finally attending high school a year later than planned. The series follows Hana as she spends time with her new friends, Eiko, Kamuri, and Tamate, without letting on that she is a year older than them.

== Characters ==
=== Main characters ===
Hana Ichinose (一之瀬 花名, Ichinose Hana)
Voiced by: Reina Kondō
Hana is a shy and modest girl who is good at studying, but not athletic. After catching mumps and missing out on her high school entry exams, she was forced to take a gap year and moved into her cousin's apartment building before attending Hoshio Private Academy as a first year. As a result, Hana is self-conscious about her current standing and that she does not have anyone of her old school friends in her company, and is therefore very glad to build up an immediate friendship with Eiko, Kamuri and Tamate. Named after 1 (一, Ichi).
Tamate Momochi (百地 たまて, Momochi Tamate)
Voiced by: Ayasa Itō
Tamate is a bubbly and energetic girl from Hana's class who likes to be friends with everyone she meets. She is notable for her protruding upper-jaw incisors and likes to be called "Tama" due to her dislike for her full name's association with the word tamatebako. Tama lives with her two grandmothers and enjoys cooking. Named after 100 (百, Hyaku, Momo).
Kamuri Sengoku (千石 冠, Sengoku Kamuri)
Voiced by: Maria Naganawa
Kamuri is a childish girl whose physical development greatly lags behind her actual age. She is an old friend of Eiko from elementary school whom she admires and becomes timid around others whenever Eiko is absent. Whenever she is addressed with a sensitive topic, she somehow manages to twitch her hair ribbon as an expression. Her main hobbies are eating and sleeping (the latter of which is perhaps the primary reason for her belated development), although she is an extremely fast runner at sports. Her name is derived from kanmuriwashi. Named after 1,000 (千, Sen).
Eiko Tokura (十倉 栄依子, Tokura Eiko)
Voiced by: Tomomi Mineuchi
Eiko is a gentle and level-headed girl with a natural charisma which has made her popular with her peers without any effort. She likes making accessories and has a crush on her homeroom teacher Kiyose Enami. Named after 10 (十, Jū, Tō).
Hiroe Hannen (万年 大会, Hannen Hiroe)
Voiced by: Maaya Uchida
Hiroe is a resident of the apartment building where Hana and Shion live. After an experience not dissimilar to Hana's led her to miss her university exams, the guilt of lying to her peers caused her to become a shut-in. She soon starts to become more confident after meeting Hana and is one of the few people who knows about her situation. Named after 10,000 (万, Man, Han).
Shion Kyōzuka (京塚 志温, Kyōzuka Shion)
Voiced by: Mao Ichimichi
Shion is Hana's adult cousin and the landlady of a boarding house where Hana resides for the duration of her high school period. She is graceful and well-endowed, but behaves more like a teenager than an adult woman. Her favorite hobby is taking a close interest in Hana's private life. Named after 10,000,000,000,000,000 (京, Kei, Kyō).
Kiyose Enami (榎並 清瀬, Enami Kiyose)
Voiced by: Manami Numakura
Kiyose is Hana's homeroom teacher who seems lethargic all the time and not interested in performing her job. It is because of these traits that she becomes an object of interest for Eiko. Kiyose was originally scheduled to play a supporting role, so she is the only main character not named after a unit of numbers.

=== Classmates ===
Amane Ōtani (大谷 周, Ōtani Amane)
Voiced by: Yuna Yoshino
She is the manager of the track and field club.
Maho Ogano (小鹿野 真秀, Ogano Maho)
Voiced by: Yuka Nukui
Maho is a member of the track and field club and runs a short distance.
Nanae Takahashi (高橋 菜々恵, Takahashi Nanae)
Voiced by: Inori Minase
Nanae is a member of the gardening club and goes to school early in the morning to take care of the flowerbeds.
Sachi Tsubakimori (椿森 幸, Tsubakimori Sachi)
Voiced by: Marika Kōno
Sachi is a schoolgirl who likes stalking Eiko.

=== Second and third year students ===
Kasane Oku (億 果実, Oku Kasane)
Kasane is a second year student who transferred to school in the fall. She was Hana's classmate at the end of her third year of junior high school. When Kasane reunited with Hana, Hana's gap year became known to Eiko, Kamuri and Tamate. Named after 100,000,000 (億, Oku).
Tsuzuri Chōno (兆野 綴, Chōno Tsuzuri)
Tsuzuri is a second year student who serves as vice-president of the student council. She often strives to become reliable to Hana, unaware that they are the same age. Named after 1,000,000,000,000 (兆, Chō).
Tsukuru Mizohata (溝端 創, Mizohata Tsukuru)
Tsukuru is a third year student who serves as student council president alongside Tsuzuri. She has a weak constitution as a result of constantly neglecting her health and is often helped out by Tsuzuru. Named after 100,000,000,000,000,000,000,000,000,000,000 (溝, Kō, Mizo).

=== Family members ===
Kyōzuka (京塚)
Voiced by: Kenta Sasa
Hazuki's father as well as Hana and Shion's grandfather. His first name is unknown.
Hazuki Ichinose (一之瀬 葉月, Ichinose Hazuki)
Voiced by: Yoko Hikasa
Hazuki is Hana's mother. Her maiden name is Kyōzuka.
Takeru Ichinose (一之瀬 健, Ichinose Takeru)
Voiced by: Rikiya Koyama
Takeru is Hana's father. He is two years younger than Hazuki.
Miki Tokura (十倉 光希, Tokura Miki)
Voiced by: Tomori Kusunoki
Eiko's younger sister, who is a year younger than her. She is supportive of her older sister and makes her soup everyday. Her similarity in appearance to Eiko is what led Kamuri to choose to go to Hoshio Private Academy.
Saeko Tokura (十倉 紗枝子, Tokura Saeko)
Saeko is Eiko and Miki's mother.
Yōji Tokura (十倉 耀司, Tokura Yōji)
Yōji is Eiko and Miki's father.
Takako (多桂子)
Voiced by: Kiyoko Miyazawa
Takako is Tamate's maternal grandmother. Her surname is unknown.
Fumi (史生)
Voiced by: Chika Makihara
Fumi is Tamate's paternal grandmother. Her surname is unknown.
Sengoku (千石)
Mrs. Sengoku is Kamuri's mother. Her first name is unknown.
Nishiki Sengoku (千石 錦, Sengoku Nishiki)
Nishiki Kamuri's father.

== Media ==
=== Manga ===
The manga series by Yuiko Tokumi began serialization in Houbunsha's seinen manga magazine Manga Time Kirara in June 2013. As of October 2026, the series has been compiled into fourteen tankōbon volumes. An anthology comic was released on February 27, 2018.

=== Anime ===
An anime television series adaptation, directed by Hiroyuki Hashimoto and produced by CloverWorks, aired in Japan between January 7 and March 25, 2018. Mio Inoue supervised the series' scripts and Masato Yasuno designed the characters. The opening theme is "ne! ne! ne!" by STARTails☆ (Reina Kondō, Tomomi Mineuchi, Maria Naganawa, and Ayasa Itō) and the ending theme is "Kaze no Koe wo Kikinagara" (風の声を聴きながら, While Listening to the Wind's Voice) by Sangatsu no Phantasia. Aniplex of America have licensed the anime and are streaming it on Crunchyroll. The series ran for 12 episodes.

No.	Title (Note: All English titles are taken from Crunchyroll.)	Original release date
1	"The First Butterflies" "Hajimari no Doki-doki" (はじまりのどきどき)	January 7, 2018
Hana Ichinose enters her new life as a high school student at the Hoshio Private Academy, feeling very self-conscious since none of her former schoolfriends are attending this school. After her homeroom teacher announces that it is her birthday, however, Hana is quickly befriended by her new classmates; Eiko Tokura, Kamuri Sengoku and Tamate Momochi, who each give her small road safety charms as an impromptu birthday present. The four of them spend the afternoon going out together, leaving Hana elated with the prospect of having made some new friends after all, despite having to hide that she is actually a year older than everyone else.
2	"Exercise Wears Me Out" "Undō no Haa-haa" (うんどうのはぁはぁ)	January 14, 2018
Hana recalls how, due to an unfortunately timed case of the mumps, she was forced to miss all of her high school entrance exams. Having to wait an entire year before she could enroll in high school, Hana moved in with her cousin Shion Kyōzuka to make a fresh start in a new location. As the girls eat their lunches together, most of them get to exchange some personal gossip about their families. Later, Hana pushes herself to survive through a fitness test, before she and the others find an ice-cream vending machine next to the gym.
3	"Teardrops are Falling" "Namida no Poro-poro" (なみだのぽろぽろ)	January 21, 2018
During Golden Week, Hana is visited by her parents prior to her friends coming over to her apartment for a study group. On the day of the study group, Eiko and Kamuri throw a surprise birthday party for both Hana and Tamate, making Hana wary of the fact she is of a different age to everyone else. After everyone leaves, Hana finds a present left behind by her parents.
4	"The Premium Tournament on the Second Floor" "Ni-kai no Puremia Taikai" (2階のプレミア大会)	January 28, 2018
Hana meets the resident who lives on the second floor of her building, Hiroe Hannen, who is allegedly studying for university exams. When asked why she has no clothes to wear for going to the convenience store, Hiroe reveals she had been lying about taking exams. Having experienced a mishap similar to Hana's on the day of her exams, Hiroe could not get into her university of choice and became a shut-in out of guilt of lying to her peers. Sympathising with her ordeal, Hana tells Hiroe about how she was a ronin too and calls on her friends to help her pick out some outdoor clothes. After going shopping for clothes with everyone's help, Hiroe thanks Hana for her help and the two become friends.
5	"Kamuri's Fluffy" "Kamuri no Fuwafuwa" (かむりのふわふわ)	February 4, 2018
Kamuri seems confused upon seeing a photo of Eiko from middle school, as she looked different to the Eiko she saw a year ago. The girls eventually find that this alleged doppelganger is actually Eiko's younger sister, Miki. Kamuri reveals that she mistook Miki for Eiko one year ago, which led her to enroll at Hoshio Girls' School to be with Eiko again.
6	"Sliminess of an Eel" "Unagi no Nurunuru" (うなぎのぬるぬる)	February 11, 2018
While on their way to a sleepover study session at Hana's apartment, the girls hear from Tamate about her experiences working at an eel restaurant. With Hiroe joining their study session, the girls enjoy a gooey bath, eat Tamate's cooking, and have Eiko play an old dating sim. Later that night, as Hana finds herself too scared to sleep, Tamate gives her some peace of mind.
7	"Cuffed Wrists" "Guruguru no Tekubi" (ぐるぐるのてくび)	February 18, 2018
While everyone else in class gives Eiko hairpins on her birthday, homeroom teacher Kiyose Enami simply gives her a paperclip while Kamuri gives her a handmade ring. On another day, Kiyose wakes up to find Eiko tied up in her apartment, learning that Eiko had carried her home after she got drunk the previous night. As Eiko takes her leave, she is taken aback by an offhand compliment from Kiyose. Later that day, Eiko is surprised to see Kiyose wearing a necklace, which Kiyose reveals she had bought the other day. Speaking privately to Hana, Eiko reveals that she makes accessories as a hobby, including the necklace that Kiyose had bought, expressing her delight over seeing something she made being worn by someone.
8	"Hana's Friends" "Hana no Tomodachi" (はなのともだち)	February 25, 2018
Hana becomes nervous around her classmate Nanae Takahashi during day duty due to having never spoken to more than half of her class. Wanting to help Hana conquer her nerves, Eiko and Tama introduce her to some of her other classmates. Later, the girls go shopping for swimsuits with plans to go to the beach during the summer. The next day, Hana takes the initiative to greet Nanae, helping her to water the school's flowers.
9	"Gorilla in a Swimsuit" "Gorira no Mizugi" (ゴリラのみずぎ)	March 4, 2018
The girls have a sleepover in preparation for a trip to the beach, only to find it raining the next morning. Not wanting to put their new swimsuits to waste, the girls decide to spend the day wearing them indoors. After being joined by Hiroe and Shion, everyone goes to a resort hotel pool, where the girls teach Hana how to swim while Hiroe and Shion get a massage. Later, the girls discover they forgot to bring underwear with them, so Shion offers some replacements.
10	"The Shark's Cousin" "Same no Itoko" (サメのいとこ)	March 11, 2018
While coming over to help Hiroe sort out her clothes, Eiko gives Hana a specially-made hairpin as thanks for listening to her the other day. The next day, Hana asks Kiyose for advice over whether she should tell the others about her gap year. Afterwards, Hana learns from Eiko that Shion has been taking an unemployed gap year herself. As Hana spends the night over in her room, Shion explains how she came to enjoy being a landlady, recalling when Hana first moved into the building.
11	"Tomato Festival" "Tomato no Matsuri" (トマトのまつり)	March 18, 2018
As summer vacation gets underway, the girls go to Tamate's house to prepare for a summer festival taking place in the evening. After getting to try some local vegetables, the girls head down to the festival, encountering several of their classmates along the way. At the end of the day, the girls set off some fireworks while Hana is thankful for becoming friends with everyone.
12	"Starting Slow" "Surō no Sutāto" (スロウのスタート)	March 25, 2018
Hana feels uncertain when her mother sends her money to buy new clothes instead of sending clothes she had picked out for her. During summer classes, the girls make plans to take Hana clothes shopping while Eiko shares another bashful moment with Kiyose. The next day, the girls help Hana pick out an outfit before deciding to buy Eiko and Kamuri some teddy bears for their birthdays to match the ones Hana and Tamate have. Afterwards, Hana sends her mother a picture of her in her new outfit.

=== Video game ===
Characters from the series appear alongside other Manga Time Kirara characters in the 2018 mobile RPG, Kirara Fantasia.

== Reception ==
Anime News Network had four editors review the first episode of the anime: James Beckett commended the pastel colors and intricate character animation for making up the overall aesthetics to appeal to its target audience but was heavily critical of the thin setup and bland characters being similar to every other all-girl slice of life series; Rebecca Silverman saw some promise in the series due to Tomomi Mineuchi's performance as Eiko and an exploration into Hana's backstory and shy personality but felt the premise was put behind in favor of adorable girls talking and having nonsensical adventures, calling it "the most pale of several similar shows to debut thus far" in the season; Theron Martin gave credit to director Hiroyuki Hashimoto for competently adapting a piece of fluff with an intriguing gimmick involving Hana's situation but felt it was a lesser offering in comparison to similarly, stronger-themed slice of life series filling the season. Lynzee Loveridge expressed disappointment at the characters' uninteresting conversation topics and saccharine art style. Following the first episode, Vrai Kraiser of Anime Feminist wrote that the emphasis on conversations about the mundane detracted from the series' themes about the difficulty of making friends anew.
