= Tomomi Mineuchi =

Japanese voice actress (born 1997)

- 嶺内 ともみ
- Born: December 22, 1997 (age 27); Tokyo, Japan
- Occupation: Voice actress
- Years active: 2016–2022
- Agent: I'm Enterprise
- Notable credits: Slow Start as Eiko Tokura; Joshi Kausei as Shibumi Shibusawa; Miss Kobayashi's Dragon Maid S as Ilulu; Slow Loop as Koi Yoshinaga

Tomomi Mineuchi (嶺内 ともみ, Mineuchi Tomomi; born December 22, 1997) is a Japanese former voice actress affiliated with I'm Enterprise.

== Biography ==
Mineuchi was born in Tokyo on December 22, 1997. She gained an interest in voice acting after she was rejected at an audition at a general public call. Mineuchi attended the Japan Narration Actor Institute, a training school for voice actors, while she was studying in high school.

Mineuchi joined the talent agency I'm Enterprise in 2016. She starred in her first major role as Eiko Tokura in the 2018 anime series Slow Start. Along with co-stars Reina Kondō, Ayasa Itō and Maria Naganawa, she also performed the series' opening theme under the unit name STARTails.

On November 20, 2022, I'm Enterprise announced that Mineuchi would retire from voice acting on December 31 of the same year.

== Filmography ==
=== Television animation ===
2017

- BanG Dream! as Mizuki Namiki, Friend 2, Students, Guitarist B, Student B (2), Arisa's Classmates, Guest B (2)

2018

- Slow Start as Eiko Tokura

2019

- Kaguya-sama: Love Is War as Ienaga
- Joshi Kausei as Shibumi Shibusawa
- Dollfro: Iyashi-hen as UMP45

2020

- Lapis Re:Lights as Alpha
- The Misfit of Demon King Academy as Carsa Kurnoah
- Is the Order a Rabbit? Bloom as Kano
- Wandering Witch: The Journey of Elaina as Yuuto
- Umayon as Ines Fujin

2021

- Scarlet Nexus as Hanabi Ichijo, Alice Ichijo
- Miss Kobayashi's Dragon Maid S as Ilulu

2022

- Slow Loop as Koi Yoshinaga
- Girls' Frontline as UMP45
- Estab Life: Great Escape as Ekua
- Extreme Hearts as Teena Merkies

=== Original net animation ===
2017

- Yakiniku-ten Sengoku as Yae Sakura

2018

- Starlight Promises as Kanna

2021

- Dollfro: Iyashi-hen 2 as UMP45

2023

- Junji Ito Maniac: Japanese Tales of the Macabre as Mari

=== Original video animation ===
2018

- Umamusume: Pretty Derby – BNW's Oath as Ines Fujin

2021

- Kaguya-sama: Love Is War as Mikiti

=== Video games ===
2017

- Hentai Shōjo: Formation Girls as Elfriede Volva

2018

- Kirara Fantasia as Eiko Tokura, Koi Yoshinaga
- Summer Pockets as Kamome Kushima
- Katana Maidens: Toji No Miko – Kizamishi Issen no Tomoshibi as Hina Aoto
- Girls' Frontline as UMP45

2020

- Re:Stage! Prism Step as Haruka Itsumura
- White Cat Project as Perumana

2021

- Umamusume: Pretty Derby as Ines Fujin
- Azur Lane as San Francisco
- Scarlet Nexus as Hanabi Ichijo, Alice Ichijo

2022

- Heaven Burns Red as Hisame Ogasahara
- Lackgirl I as Satsuki
- Monochrome Mobius: Rights and Wrongs Forgotten as Nava

2023

- Fire Emblem Engage as Etie
- Fire Emblem Heroes as Etie
