= Joshi Kausei =

Japanese manga series

- Cover of Joshi Kausei volume 1 by Futabasha

女子かう生
- Genre: Comedy
- Manga
- Written by: Ken Wakai
- Published by: Futabasha
- English publisher: Crunchyroll (digital)
- Magazine: Web Comic Action
- Original run: 2013 – present
- Volumes: 9
- Anime television series
- Directed by: Tokihiro Sasaki
- Written by: Tokihiro Sasaki
- Studio: Seven
- Original network: AT-X, Tokyo MX
- Original run: April 6, 2019 – June 22, 2019
- Episodes: 12
- icon

Joshi Kausei (女子かう生) (Note: The title translates to "High School Girls". Normally written as 女子高生, the character 高 is written in historical kana orthography as かう.) is a Japanese comedy manga series by Ken Wakai. It has been serialized via Futabasha's digital publication Web Comic Action since 2013 and has been collected in nine tankōbon volumes. The manga is published digitally in North America by Crunchyroll. An anime television series adaptation by Seven aired from April 6 to June 22, 2019.

== Premise ==
The series is a "silent" work without any dialogue that follows three high school girls as they cause and experience comedic and suggestive situations.

== Characters ==
Momoko Futo (富戸 もも子, Futo Momoko)
Voiced by: Rika Tachibana
Momoko is basically the leader in the trio of girls. She is voluptuous, carefree and adventurous, but sometimes she can also be a klutz; she would often be the one who gets upskirted without even her being aware of it. Her name in Japanese order is a play on words that can be translated to "girl with thick thighs".
Shibumi Shibusawa (渋沢 しぶ美, Shibusawa Shibumi)
Voiced by: Tomomi Mineuchi
Shibumi is the only one who wears glasses and sports a zettai ryoki; she is also a top student in her class. She is basically uptight and reserved in class, but when she is with her friends Momoko and Mayumi, she can let her hair down.
Mayumi Furui (古井 まゆみ, Furui Mayumi)
Voiced by: Yurika Kubo
Mayumi is a transfer student, which explains why her uniform is different from her classmates. She is friends with Momoko and Shibumi. Among the trio, she is the petite one, but she is also very caring — she would tell her friends if something is wrong.

== Media ==
=== Manga ===
No.	Release date	ISBN
1	April 10, 2014	978-4-575-84388-0
2	September 10, 2014	978-4-575-84485-6
3	March 10, 2015	978-4-575-84593-8
4	October 10, 2015	978-4-575-84704-8
5	June 11, 2016	978-4-575-84811-3
6	January 12, 2017	978-4-575-84915-8
7	November 10, 2017	978-4-575-85058-1
8	September 12, 2018	978-4-575-85205-9
9	June 12, 2019	978-4-575-85316-2

=== Anime ===
An anime television series adaptation was announced on the eighth volume of the manga on September 12, 2018. The series is animated by Seven, with Tokihiro Sasaki directed and writing the series, and Kyōhei Yamamoto designed the characters. The series aired from April 6 to June 22, 2019, on AT-X and Tokyo MX's FutabAnime time slot. Amatsuuni performed the series' opening theme song "silent days". Crunchyroll streamed the series.

No.	Title	Original release date
1	"The High School Girl and Thighs"; Transliteration: "Joshi Kausei to Futo momo" (Japanese: 女子かう生とふともも)	April 6, 2019
2	"The High School Girl and the Unlucky Day"; Transliteration: "Joshi Kausei to Fukō na ichi nichi" (Japanese: 女子かう生と不幸な一日)	April 13, 2019
3	"The High School Girl and Drowsiness"; Transliteration: "Joshi Kausei to Nemuke" (Japanese: 女子かう生と眠気)	April 20, 2019
4	"The High School Girl and the Family Restaurant"; Transliteration: "Joshi Kausei to Famiresu" (Japanese: 女子かう生とファミレス)	April 27, 2019
5	"The High School Girl and the Skateboard"; Transliteration: "Joshi Kausei to Sukebō" (Japanese: 女子かう生とスケボー)	May 4, 2019
6	"The High School Girl and Working Out"; Transliteration: "Joshi Kausei to Kintore" (Japanese: 女子かう生と筋トレ)	May 11, 2019
7	"The High School Girl and the Foggy Window"; Transliteration: "Joshi Kausei to Kumori mado" (Japanese: 女子かう生と曇り窓)	May 18, 2019
8	"The High School Girl and Hiding from the Rain"; Transliteration: "Joshi Kausei to Amayadori" (Japanese: 女子かう生と雨宿り)	May 25, 2019
9	"The High School Girl and Shadow Puppets"; Transliteration: "Joshi Kausei to Kagee" (Japanese: 女子かう生と影絵)	June 1, 2019
10	"The High School Girl and the Hair Barrette"; Transliteration: "Joshi Kausei to Kamidome" (Japanese: 女子かう生と髪留め)	June 8, 2019
11	"The High School Girl and the Kotatsu"; Transliteration: "Joshi Kausei to Kotatsu" (Japanese: 女子かう生とコタツ)	June 15, 2019
12	"The High School Girl and the Road Home"; Transliteration: "Joshi Kausei to Kaerimichi" (Japanese: 女子かう生と帰り道)	June 22, 2019
