= Yurika (musician) =

Japanese musician

Yurika 小林 友里花
- Born: October 29, 1995 (age 30); Hasuda, Saitama
- Occupation: Musician
- Years active: 2017–present

Yurika Kobayashi (小林 友里花, Kobayashi Yurika; born October 29, 1995), mononymously known by the stage name Yurika (stylized as YURiKA) is a Japanese musician from Hasuda, Saitama who is signed to F.I.X. Records. She made her professional debut in 2017 with the release of the single "Shiny Ray", the title track of which was used as the first opening theme to the anime television series Little Witch Academia.

== Biography ==
Yurika was born in Hasuda, Saitama on October 29, 1995. From an early age, she had dreamed of becoming a musician. She started playing the piano at the age of 3, and she also listened to the music of Morning Musume and its subgroup Minimoni. While in elementary school, she heard the song "Genesis of Aquarion" by Akino in a commercial, which led her to become interested in anime music and a desire to perform songs for anime. Her desire to become an anime musician was also influenced by the popularity of the series Haruhi Suzumiya and K-On! at the time.

In high school, she tried out for the Animax Anison Grand Prix and other anime-related singing competitions. In 2014, she placed 6th in a televised competition sponsored by Nippon TV and first in an anime music singing competition sponsored by NHK. In 2016, she won an audition sponsored by the media company Toho and signed a contract with label Toho Animation Records.

She made her professional debut in 2017 with the release of her first single "Shiny Ray" on February 22, 2017; the title track is used as the first opening theme to the anime television series Little Witch Academia. Her second single "Mind Conductor" was released on May 24, 2017; the title track is used as the second opening theme to Little Witch Academia. Her third single "Kyōmen no Nami" (鏡面の波, The Waves on the Mirror's Surface) was released on December 6, 2017; the title track is used as the opening theme to the anime series Land of the Lustrous. She performed an insert song for the 2018 visual novel Summer Pockets. In September 2019, she performed the singles "Le zoo", "Sleeping instinct", "Marble" and "Floating Story on the Moon" for the anime television series Beastars. Each track served as an ending theme.

In 2023, she performed at Anime Friends in Brazil.

== Discography ==
=== Singles ===
Title	Oricon chart position
Shiny Ray: Released: February 22, 2017	64
Mind Conductor: Released: May 22, 2017	75
Kyōmen no Nami (鏡面の波): Released: December 6, 2017	43
Futari no Hane (ふたりの羽根): Released: August 15, 2018	36
