= Shiori Goto: Best =

Greatest hits album by Shiori Niiyama
- Released: 30 January 2018
- Recorded: 2012–2017
- Genres: Japanese pop, rock
- Label: Being Inc.
- Producer: Shiori Niiyama

Shiori Niiyama chronology
Finder no Mukou (2016)	Shiori Goto: Best (2018)

Singles from Shiori Goto: Best
- 1. "Dakara sa -acoustic version-" Released: 12 December 2012; 2. "Sayonara Watashi no Koigokoro" Released: 6 September 2017

Shiori Goto: Best (しおりごと-BEST-) is the first greatest hits album by Japanese singer-songwriter Shiori Niiyama. It released on 30 January 2018 under Being Inc. label. It was also her final work before her hiatus announcement.

== Background ==
The album was released as promotion for her 5th year of singer debut anniversary.

The album includes a complete collection of all singles by chronological releases, since their her single "Yureru Yureru" until her latest single "Sayonara Watashi no Koigokoro".

Some tracks like "Kei", "Koi no Naka" and "Snow Smile" were previously released in her third and final studio album Finder no Mukou.

The 9th single Sayonara Watashi no Koigokoro was included for the first time in the album format. The bonus track, "Dakarasa -acoustic version-" which was released in 2012 as a pre-debut single, was included in album for the first time, however in her debut album Shiori was released only the re-recorded version of Dakarasa, without acoustic guitar.

First press release includes additional DVD disc with eleven music video clips in full version, while short versions were previously uploaded on YouTube.

A special content website "Shiori 5th Anniversary best" was launched in November 2017 with albums informations, preview tracks, self liner notes by Shiori herself and congratulation comments by various people from music industry, included Sakura Fujiwara and producer Masanori Sasaji.

== Track listing ==
No.	Title	Lyrics	Music	Arrangers	Length
1.	"Yureru Yureru (ゆれるユレル)" (debut single)	Niiyama	Ryotaro and Shiori Niiyama	Masanori Sasaji	3:59
2.	"Dont' Cry" (2nd single)	Niiyama	Niiyama	Sasaji	4:08
3.	"Hitorigoto (ひとりごと)" (3rd single)	Niiyama	Eriko Yoshiki	Sasaji	3:53
4.	"Ima Koko ni Iru (今 ここにいる)" (4th single)	Niiyama	h-wonder	Sasaji	3:50
5.	"Zettai (絶対)" (5th single)	Niiyama	Niiyama	Sasaji	4:19
6.	"Arigato (ありがとう)" (6th single)	Niiyama	Yosuke Yamashita	Yamashita	4:39
7.	"Tonari no Yukue (隣の行方)" (7th single)	Niiyama	Shoutarou Kobayashi	Kotaro Kusano	4:41
8.	"Mou Ikanakucha (もう、行かなくちゃ。)" (7th single's coupling song)	Niiyama	Masazumi Ozawa (ex.Pamelah)	Sasaji	4:29
9.	"Atashi wa Atashi no Mamade (あたしはあたしのままで)" (8th single)	Niiyama	Shinpei Nozaki	Masanori Shimada	4:08
10.	"Koi no Naka (恋の中)" (8th single's coupling, collaboration with Fukuyama Masaharu)	Masaharu	Fukuyama Masaharu	Masaharu	4:23
11.	"Kei (糸)" (from 3rd studio album Finder no Mukou, cover song of Miyuki Nakajima)	Nakajima	Miyuki Nakajima	Sasaji	4:18
12.	"Snow Smile" (from 3rd studio album Finder no Mukou)	Niiyama	Kusano	Kusano	3:50
13.	"Sayonara Watashi no Koigokoro (さよなら私の恋心)" (9th single, collaboration with CHARA)	CHARA	CHARA	CHARA	4:47
14.	"Dakara sa -acoustic version- (だからさ)" (bonus track)	Niiyama	Niiyama	Sasaji	3:18

== In media ==
- Yureru Yureru was used as insert theme song for movie Zekkyō Gakkyū
- Don't cry was used as theme song for movie Zekkyō Gakkyū
- Hitori Goto was used as ending theme for Tokyo Broadcasting System Television program CDTV
- Ima Koko ni Iru was used as commercial song for Kuraray company
- Zettai was used as ending theme for Tokyo Broadcasting System Television program "King's Brunch" (Oujisama no Brunch)
- Arigatou was used as theme song for Chiba TV program "Music Launcher"
- Tonari no Yukue was used as an opening theme for Nihon TV music program "Buzz Rhythm"
- Mou, Ikanakucha. was used as theme song for movie Hotel Coban
- Atashi wa Atashi no Mama de was used as official image song for Nihon TV programMusical Instrument Fair 2016
- Koi no Naka was used as insert song for drama Love song
- Kei was used as ending song for movie Koto
- Snow Smile was used as commercial song for event Fuyu Spo!! Winter Sports Festa16
