= A Cup of Day =

Studio album by Ramjet Pulley
- Released: September 27, 2001
- Recorded: 2000–2001
- Genre: J-pop
- Length: 49:21
- Label: Giza
- Producer: Ramjet Pulley

Ramjet Pulley chronology
A Cup of Day (2001)	It's a Wonderful Feeling (2003)

Singles from A Cup of Day
- 1. "Hello...Good Bye" Released: 8 November 2000; 2. "Overjoyed" Released: 4 April 2001; 3. "Destiny ~21 Another One~" Released: 14 July 2001; 4. "Final Way" Released: 22 August 2001

A Cup of Day is the debut album by Japanese J-pop band Ramjet Pulley. It was released on September 27, 2001, under the Giza Studio label.

== Background ==
The album consists of four previously released singles, such as Hello Goodbye, Overjoyed, Destiny ~21 Another One~ and Final Way.

Their third single Destiny ~21 Another One~ is an alternative version of their song Destiny which was included in debut single Hello..goodbye as a coupling song.

Overjoyed is a Japanese cover of the famous song by Stevie Wonder which includes completely new melody and translated lyrics into Japanese. This song along with their fourth single Final Way were included in the compilation album Giza Studio Masterpiece Blend 2001.

Yes...no is a coupling song from their second single.

Three songs out of fourteen are only instrumental by Satoru Kobayashi.

== Charting ==
The album charted at No. 100 on Oricon in its first week. It charted for one week and sold more than 3,290+ copies.

== Track listing ==
All lyrics are written by Satomi Makoshi; all music is composed by Kazunobu Mashima

No.	Title	Length
1.	"Final Way"	3:03
2.	"Overjoyed" (Stevie Wonder cover)	4:51
3.	"Hello... Good Bye"	4:03
4.	"NEWS & Bed & TRIP"	4:27
5.	"Destiny ~21 Another One~" (originally performed by Miki Matsuhashi)	5:09
6.	"The Night falls" (Instrumental)	0:51
7.	"A Cup of Day"	4:07
8.	"Bulanco"	5:07
9.	"I'événement D'un Jour" (Instrumental)	1:08
10.	"Yes... no"	4:28
11.	"Shopping in My Village" (Instrumental)	0:55
12.	"Good Bye Yesterday"	4:54
13.	"Je t'aime"	4:17
14.	"Always ~In my Heart~"	4:57

== Personnel ==
Credits adapted from the CD booklet of A cup of day.

- Akiko Matsuda - vocals
- Satomi Makoshi - songwriting
- Kazunobu Mashima - composing
- Satoru Kobayashi - arranging
- Ryoichi Terashima - acoustic guitar
- Masaharu Ishikawa - drums
- Kouichi Osamu - wood bass
- Takashi Masuzaki (Dimension) - guitar
- Akira Onozuka (Dimension) - piano
- Kazuki Katsuta (Dimejsion) - tenor sax
- Taku Oyabu - recording, mixing
- Hiroyuki Kubota - recording
- Satoshi Fukuda - assistant engineering
- Akio Nakajima - mixing
- Masahiro Shimada - mastering
- Toshiyuki Ebihara - A&R
- Shinichi Takgagi - public relations
- Emi Akuzawa - public relations
- Noriko Ohgami – art direction
- Kanonji - producing

== Cover ==
- The coupling song Destiny was later covered and performed by Japanese singersongwriter Miki Matsuhashi, the song was used as opening theme for Anime television series Detective Conan, in credits Satomi and Kazunobu are mentioned as well. Re-arranged version of "Destiny" appears in duet single Nanatsu no Umi wo Wataru Kaze no you ni by U-ka Saegusa in db and Rina Aiuchi.
- The debut single Hello...Goodbye was covered by various Japanese idol groups such as Momoiro Clover Z which was included in compilation album Iriguchi no Nai Deguchi; Majestic 7 and Launchers.

== In media ==
- Good-bye Yesterday: ending theme for Nihon TV/Yomiuri TV program Wake up!
