= Finder no Mukou =

Studio album by Shiori Niiyama
- Released: 30 November 2016
- Recorded: 2015–2016
- Genre: Japanese pop
- Length: 46 minutes
- Label: Being
- Producer: Masanori Sasaji; Fukuyama Masaharu; Asano Takashi

Shiori Niiyama chronology
| Hello Goodbye (2015) | Finder no Mukou (2016) | Shiori Goto: Best (2018) |

Singles from Finder no Mukou
- 1. "Tonari no Yukue" Released: 10 February 2016; 2. "Atashi wa Atashi no Mama de" Released: 29 June 2016

Finder no Mukou (ファインダーの向こう, Faindā no mukō) is the third studio album by Japanese singer Shiori Niiyama. It was released on 30 November 2016, one year and five months after second studio album Hello Goodbye. The album was recorded under Being Inc. label.

== Background ==
Album includes previous 2 released singles, Tonari no Yukue and Atashi wa Atashi no Mama de. A famous Japanese musicians as Fukuyama Masaharu were involved with the music production of the album. The album was released in three version: regular one with special CD of cover song which were previously released as b-side of singles, first press release first version which includes special DVD disc with music clips and second version with live performances.

== Charting ==
The album reached #14 in daily rank and #26 for first week. It's charting for two weeks.

== Track listing ==
All songs were written by Shiori Niiyama (expect tracks #3 (by Fukuyama Masaharu) and #4 (by Miyuki Nakajima)).

| No. | Title | Music | Arrangers | Length |
|---|---|---|---|---|
| 1. | "Atashi wa Atashi no Mama de" (あたしはあたしのままで) | Shinpei Nozaki | Masanori Shimada | 4:08 |
| 2. | "Snow Smile" | Kotarou Kusuno | Kotarou Kusuno | 3:50 |
| 3. | "Koi no Naka" (恋の中) | Fukuyama Masaharu | Fukuyama Masaharu | 4:23 |
| 4. | "Kei" (糸) | Miyuki Nakajima | Masanori Sasaji | 4:15 |
| 5. | "Yonchoume no Kousaten" (四丁目の交差点) | Shiori Niiyama | Kentarou Kaneko | 3:45 |
| 6. | "Sweet Road" | Tomomi Moriguchi | Takashi Asano | 4:16 |
| 7. | "Mou, Ikanakucha." (もう、行かなくちゃ。) | Masazumi Ozawa (ex.Pamelah) | Masanori Sasaji | 4:29 |
| 8. | "Name no nai Tegami" (名前のない手紙) | Shiori Niiyama | Sumito Kanza | 4:14 |
| 9. | "Heya de no Hanashi" (部屋でのはなし) | Shiori Niiyama | Masanori Shimada | 4:06 |
| 10. | "Life" | Shiori Niiyama and Takashi Asano | Takashi Asano | 4:41 |
| 11. | "Tonari no Yukue" (隣の行方) | Shotarou Kobayashi | Kotaro Kusano | 3:38 |

== In media ==
- Koi no Naka was used as insert song for drama Love song
- Snow Smile was used as commercial song for event Fuyu Spo!! Winter Sports Festa16
- Atashi wa Atashi no Mama de was used as official image song for Nihon TV programMusical Instrument Fair 2016
- Kei was used as ending song for movie Koto
- Namae no nai Tegami was used as insert song for short YouTube movie Matcha!!
- Mou, Ikanakucha. was used as theme song for movie Hotel Coban
