= Shiori (Shiori Niiyama album) =

Studio album by Shiori Niiyama
- Released: 26 March 2014
- Recorded: 2012–2014
- Genre: Japanese pop
- Length: 47 minutes
- Label: Being
- Producer: Masanori Sasaji

Shiori Niiyama chronology
Shiori (2014)	Hello Goodbye (2015)

Singles from Shiori
- 1. "Yureru Yureru" Released: 17 April 2013; 2. "Don't Cry" Released: 10 July 2013; 3. "Hitorigoto" Released: 13 November 2013; 4. "Ima Koko ni Iru" Released: 12 February 2014

Shiori (しおり) is the debut studio album by Japanese singer-songwriter Shiori Niiyama. It was released on 26 March 2014 under Being label. Album includes previous 5 released singles. The album reached #39 rank first week. Album charted for 4 weeks.

== Track listing ==
All songs were written by Shiori Niiyama and arranged by Masanori Sasaji

No.	Title	Music	Length
1.	"Looking to the sky"	Shiori Niiyama and Takanori Fujimoto	5:13
2.	"Yureru Yureru" (ゆれるユレル)	Shiori Niiyama and Ryotaro	3:59
3.	"Ima Koko ni Iru" (今 ここにいる)	h-wonder	3:50
4.	"Daijoubu Datte" (「大丈夫」だって)	Shiori Niiyama and Ookumakunio	4:30
5.	"Tanpopo" (たんぽぽ)	Shiori Niiyama	5:14
6.	"Everybody say yeah"	Akihito Tanaka	3:54
7.	"Gogo 3 Ji" (午後3時)	Shiori Niiyama	3:48
8.	"Hitorigoto" (ひとりごと)	Eriko Yoshiki	3:53
9.	"17 Sai no Natsu" (17歳の夏)	Masazumi Ozawa (ex.Pamelah)	3:52
10.	"Dakara sa" (だからさ)	Shiori Niiyama	4:32
11.	"Don't Cry"	Shiori Niiyama	4:08

== In media ==
- Looking to the sky was used as ending theme for TV Tokyo program Crossroad
- Yureru Yureru was used as insert theme song for movie Zekkyō Gakkyū
- Ima Koko ni Iru was used as commercial song for Kuraray company
- Hitori Goto was used as ending theme for Tokyo Broadcasting System Television program CDTV
- Don't cry was used as theme song for movie Zekkyō Gakkyū
