= Masazumi Ozawa =

- Also known as: M-oZ
- Born: November 25, 1965 (age 59)
- Origin: Kanaya, Shizuoka, Japan
- Genres: Japanese pop, Power pop
- Occupation(s): Musician composer producer arranger keyboardist guitarist music sequencer
- Instrument(s): guitar keyboard
- Years active: 1991–
- Labels: Being Inc.
- Website: Being's Official Website

Masazumi Ozawa (小澤 正澄, Ozawa Masazumi) is a Japanese composer, arranger and guitarist from agency Being Inc.

== Career ==
In 1991, he debuted as a composer for Japanese rock band Wands debut single's b-side track Stray Cat.

In years 1995-2001, he was member of power-pop unit Pamelah as a composer, arranger, keyboardist, music sequencer and guitarist. During time he constantly provided music for artist as Kaori Nanao, Kondo Fusanosuke, Zard or Field of View. As leader of Pamelah, he produced over 14 singles and 5 studio albums.

Since Pamela's disbanded, Ozawa continued providing music for various artists including U-ka Saegusa in dB, Azumi Uehara, Aiko Kitahara, Rina Aiuchi or Sard Underground

He is still active as of 2023.

== List of provided works ==
=== Composer ===
==== Wands ====
- Stray Cat (b-side from single "Sabishisa wa Aki no Iro")

==== Zard ====
- Ai ga Mienai

==== Kaori Nanao ====
- Kaito, Uso, Mahiru no Yami (from album "Hajimari no Uta")

==== Azumi Uehara ====
- Tear Drop (from album "Mushoku")
- First Love (from album "Ikitakuwanai Bokura)

==== Aiko Kitahara ====
- Himawari no Youni
- Yume nara Samenaide (b-side from single "Nijiiro ni Hikaru Umi")
- Special Days!
- Kindan no Kajitsu, Yuki Furu Yoru wa Dakishimete, Ame no Naka (from album Piece of Love)
- Ano Koro no Kimi de Ite (from album Message)
- Daijoubu (b-side from single "Mou Ichido Kimi ni Koishiteru")
- Season (from album Sea)
- Sakura Saku (b-side from single "Sekaijuu Doko wo Sagashitemo")
- Koihanabi (from album Shanti)

==== U-ka Saegusa in dB ====
- Kimi to Yakusoku Shita Yasashii Ano Basho made, I can't see, I can't feel (from album U-ka saegusa IN db 1st ~Kimi to Yakusoku Shita Yasashii Ano Basho made~)
- Atsui Jounetsu Dakishimete
- Dandan Kimi no Egao ga Tookunatteiku
- Precious Memories, Kanashii Ame ga Furitsuzuite mo, Zutto Zutto Kimi no Koibito de Itai (from album U-ka saegusa IN db IV ~Crystal na Kisetsu ni Miserarete~)

==== Shiori Takei ====
- Sweet Home

==== Sayuri Iwata ====
- Sayonara to
- 15
- First Love
- Harukaze
- Kotoba

==== Crush Tears ====
- Mad Love

==== B.B.Queens ====
- Let's Go, Girl!

==== NMB48 ====
- Prom no Koibito

==== SKE48 ====
- Futari dake no Parade
- Aishiteraburu

==== AKB48 ====
- Mitsu no Namida
- Itsuka Mita Umi no Soko
- Boy Hunt no Houhou Oshiemasu

==== Shiori Niiyama ====
- 17Sai no Natsu

==== Jang Keun-suk ====
- Don't be Afraid, Dakishimetai, Kawaita Kiss, Going Crazy (from album Voyage)

==== Band-Maid ====
- Arcadia Girl

=== Arranger ===
==== Yumiko Morishita ====
- Itsumademo Lovin' You, Looking For True Love, Mou Hitotsu no Mirai, Motto Zutto Chikaku ni Kanjitai (from album Kick Off!)

==== Field of View ====
- Kawaita Sakebi

==== Chika Yoshida ====
- Kamusharana Ai

==== Aika Ohno ====
- Easy Game

==== Rina Aiuchi ====
- STEP UP!, Girl's Play (Playgirl)
- Akaku Atsui Kodou
- Sugao no mama
- Thanx
- Time

==== Sayuri Iwata ====
- Sayonara to
- Ashita wa Kyou yori Waratteiraremasuyouni
- Harukaze
- Kotoba

==== Pinc Inc ====
- Motto Kimiiro ni Somaritai

==== Mai Kuraki ====
- Puzzle
- Future Kiss
- Another day＊another world

==== La PomPon ====
- Nazo

==== Shiori Niiyama ====
- Mou Ikanakucha (from album Finder no Mukou)
