= Kimi to Yakusoku Shita Yasashii Ano Basho made =

2003 single by U-ka Saegusa in dB

Single by U-ka Saegusa in dB

from the album U-ka saegusa IN db 1st ~Kimi to Yakusoku Shita Yasashii Ano Basho made~
- B-side: "I Shall Be Released" "Destiny Wind Blows"
- Released: October 29, 2003
- Genre: J-pop; anime song
- Length: 4:51
- Label: Giza Studio
- Songwriter(s): U-ka Saegusa; Masazumi Ozawa
- Producer(s): Kannonji

U-ka Saegusa in dB singles chronology
"I Can't See, I Can't Feel" (2003)	"Kimi to Yakusoku Shita Yasashii Ano Basho made" (2003)	"Nemuru Kimi no Yokogao ni Hohoemi wo" (2004)

"Kimi to Yakusoku Shita Yasashii Ano Basho made" (君と約束した優しいあの場所まで, lit. "To That Tender Place Where I Promised with You") is a song by Japanese pop rock band U-ka Saegusa in dB. It was released on 29 October 2003 through Giza Studio, as the fourth single from their debut studio album U-ka saegusa IN db 1st ~Kimi to Yakusoku Shita Yasashii Ano Basho made~. The single reached number eight in Japan and has sold over 33,955 copies nationwide, becoming the band's best-selling single to date. The song served as one of the theme songs to the Japanese anime television series, Case Closed.

== Track listing ==
CD single
No.	Title	Writer(s)	Arranger(s)	Length
1.	"Kimi to Yakusoku Shita Yasashii Ano Basho made"	U-ka Saegusa; Masazumi Ozawa	Ozawa	4:51
2.	"I Shall Be Released"	Saegusa; Aika Ohno	Ozawa	4:05
3.	"Destiny Wind Blows"	Saegusa; Makoto Miyoshi	Ozawa	4:28
4.	"Tears Go By" (DJ Me-Ya Remix)	Saegusa; Ohno	DJ Me-Ya	4:40
5.	"I Can't See, I Can't Feel" (Lee's Feel Mix)	Saegusa; Ozawa		5:04
6.	"Kimi to Yakusoku Shita Yasashii Ano Basho made" (Instrumental)	Saegusa; Ozawa	Ozawa	4:50

== Charts ==
Chart (2003)	Peak position
Japan (Oricon)	8

== Certification and sales ==
Region	Certification	Certified units/sales
Japan (RIAJ)	None	33,955

== Release history ==
Region	Date	Format	Catalogue Num.	Label	Ref.
Japan	29 October 2003	CD	GZCA-7034	Giza Studio	
