= Pamelah (band) =

Japanese pop band

- Origin: Japan
- Genres: Electro pop Power pop
- Years active: 1995–2000
- Label: Nippon Columbia (signed under Being Inc.)
- Past members: Yuki Mizuhara (水原 由貴); Masazumi Ozawa (小澤正澄)
- Website: Being's Official Website

Pamelah (パメラ Pamera) were a Japanese electro-power-pop band formed in 1995 by vocalist and lyricist, Yuki Mizuhara and composer and guitarist, Masazumi Ozawa. The band's name was created by Daiko Nagato and comes from actresses name, Pamela Tiffin who was popular mainly in the 1960s. Pamelah disbanded in 2000.

== Biography ==
Before band formation, Masazumi has already been active as an arranger. His first work was included in Wands's debut single Sabishisa wa Aki no Iro in b-side track Stray Cat. Yuki has been educated with various vocal lessons since 1992 until debut.

In February 1995, Pamelah debuted with their single Looking for the Truth. The song was written by Mariko Kurosawa. Since then, all their music was self-produced.

In 1996, after releasing their second studio album Pure, they were rewarded with a Japanese Gold Disc in Best 5 New Artist nominations. The album ranked No.3 in Oricon Weekly Charts and sold over more than 200,000 copies.

The artist is one of the few performers from Being Inc.., along with Manish, to have appeared on Music Station.

In 1997, their single Spirit was used as a third ending theme for the anime television series Hell Teacher Nūbē. It became their most successful single, reached in Oricon Weekly Charts with rank 15.

In 1998, their official website was launched alongside their fan club.

In 1999 March they held their first video chat with fans. After releasing their final studio album Ism in September, they disbanded without announcement.

In 2000, Yuki started her solo career by releasing single Love is pain, however soon after release, she stopped appearing in public and her music is no longer sold anywhere. Masazumi continues to provide arrangements and guitar assistance to many Giza Studio artists such as Aiko Kitahara or U-ka Saegusa in dB.

In 2003, during the release of complete at the being studio compilation album series, the album includes two previously unreleased songs: Yuki's solo single and Aimai which were both exclusively released only for this album.

Some of their music videos were released in 2012 in the 2-disc DVD set Legend of 90's J-Rock Best Live & Clips.

In 2016, Masazumi appeared as a guest musician during Zard live tour Zard What a beautiful memory: Forever Best 25. Yuki has not appeared publicly since 2000.

== Members ==
- Yuki Mizuhara (水原 由貴)- vocalist, lyricist
- Masazumi Ozawa (小澤 正澄)- keyboardist, composer, arranger, programmator

== Discography ==
During their career they released five studio albums, three compilation albums, and one remix album, alongside fourteen singles.

=== Albums ===
==== Studio albums ====
Title	Album details	Peak chart positions
Title	Album details	JPN Oricon
Truth	Released: 21 December 1995; Label: Nippon Columbia; Formats: CD, digital download	14
Pure	Released: 4 September 1996; Label: Nippon Columbia; Formats: CD, digital download	3
Spirit	Released: 26 March 1997; Label: Nippon Columbia; Formats: CD, digital download	7
Hearts	Released: 30 September 1998; Label: Nippon Columbia; Formats: CD, digital download	9
Ism	Released: 29 September 1999; Label: Nippon Columbia; Formats: CD, digital download	18

==== Remix albums ====
Title	Album details	Peak chart positions
Title	Album details	JPN Oricon
Remix Edition: Pamelaholic	Released: 28 July 1998; Label: Nippon Columbia; Formats: CD	39

==== Compilation albums ====
Title	Album details	Peak chart positions
Title	Album details	JPN Oricon
Pamelah Hit Collection: Confidence	Released: 20 December 1997; Label: Nippon Columbia; Formats: CD	9
Pamelah Hit Collection: Confidence	Released: 25 January 2003; Label: Zain; Formats: CD, digital download	126
Best of Best 1000 Pamelah	Released: 12 December 2007; Label: Zain; Formats: CD	—

=== Singles ===
Year	Album	Chart positions (JP)	Label
1995	"Looking for the truth"	26	Nippon Columbia
1995	"I Feel Down"	30	Nippon Columbia
1995	"Kirei ni nanka Aisenai" (キレイになんか愛せない)	31	Nippon Columbia
1996	"I Shall Be Released"	26	Nippon Columbia
1996	"Blind Love"	20	Nippon Columbia
1996	"Namida" (涙)	24	Nippon Columbia
1997	"Spirit"	15	Nippon Columbia
1997	"Itoshii Kimi" (いとしいキミ)	25	Nippon Columbia
1997	"Confidence"	37	Nippon Columbia
1998	"Two of hearts"	30	Nippon Columbia
1998	"Kizuna" (キズナ)	34	Nippon Columbia
1999	"Kioku" (記憶)	50	Nippon Columbia
1999	"Yurusarenai Koi" (許されない恋)	49	Nippon Columbia
1999	"Individualism"	50	Nippon Columbia

== Japan Gold Disc Award Certifications ==
- 1996: Best 5 New Coming Artist

== In-media usage ==
- Looking for the truth was used as an ending theme for TV Asahi news program Ongaku News NO.
- I Feel Down was used as an opening theme for TV Asahi music program Ongaku News HO
- Kirei ni Nanka Aisenai was used as a theme song for TV Asahi neo variety program PafoPafo
- I shall be released was used as an ending theme for TV Asahi music program Ongaku News HO
- Blind Love was used as an opening theme for TV Asahi sports variety program Ring no Tamashii
- Namida was used as an opening theme for TV Asahi variety program Kamioka Ryuutaro no Kinin
- Spirit was used as a second ending theme for Anime television series Hell Teacher Nūbē
- Itoshii Kimi was used as a commercial song for Suzuki new model New Jinmy and as an ending theme for TV Asahi variety program Youkini Capucino
- Confidence was used as an opening theme for TV Asahi sports variety program Ring no Tamashii
- Two of hearts was used as an opening theme for TV Asahi Owarai program Owarai Koujou Iinkai Warawasero and as a commercial song for Autobacs Seven
- Kizuna was used as a theme song for TV Tokyo television drama series Rosetta: The Masked Angel
- Kioku was used as a theme song for TV Asahi short television drama series Aozora Mahjong
- Individualism was used as an opening theme for TV Asahi information program Midnight Mermaid

== Television appearances ==
Music Station:

- Looking for the truth
- I Feel Down
- Kirei ni nanka Aisenai
- I shall be released (guest musician: Hirohito Furui)
- Blind Love
- Namida
- Spirit
- Itoshii Kimi
- Confidence
- Kizuna

CDTV:

- I shall be released

Utaban:

- Kizuna

== Magazine appearances ==
From Music Freak Magazine:

- Vol.11: 1995/October
- Vol.14: 1996/January
- Vol.15: 1996/February
- Vol.21: 1996/August
- Vol.22: 1996/September
- Vol.26: 1997/January
- Vol.28: 1997/March
- Vol.29: 1997/April
- Vol.32: 1997/July
- Vol.36: 1997/November
- Vol.37: 1997/December
- Vol.42: 1998/May
- Vol.45: 1998/August
- Vol.46: 1998/September
- Vol.47: 1998/October
- Vol.51: 1999/February
- Vol.54: 1999/May
- Vol.55: 1999/June
- Vol.58: 1999/September
- Vol.59: 1999/October
