= Sea (Aiko Kitahara album) =

Studio album by Aiko Kitahara
- Released: August 9, 2006
- Recorded: 2005–2006
- Genre: J-pop
- Length: 50:42
- Label: Giza Studio
- Producer: Daiko Nagato

Aiko Kitahara chronology
Message (2005)	Sea (2006)	Shanti (2007)

Singles from Sea
- 1. "Te Quiero Te Amo ~Natsu no Natsu no Koi~" Released: July 20, 2005; 2. "Tango" Released: January 18, 2006; 3. "Mou Ichido Kimi ni Koishiteiru" Released: April 26, 2006; 4. "Moshi mo Umare Kawattara Mou Ichido Aishitekuremasuka?" Released: July 19, 2006

Sea is the third studio album by Japanese singer and songwriter Aiko Kitahara. It was released on May 11, 2006, through Giza Studio.

The album consists of four previous released singles, such as Te Quiero Te Amo ~Natsu no Natsu no Koi~ (テ・ケロ テ・アモ 〜夏の夏の恋〜), Tango, Mou Ichido Kimi ni Koishiteiru (もう一度 君に恋している) and Moshi mo Umare Kawattara Mou Ichido Aishitekuremasuka? (もしも生まれ変わったら もう一度 愛してくれますか?).

A special website was launched to promote album with preview tracks and liner notes.

The album charted at #78 on the Oricon charts in its first week. It charted for two weeks.

== Track listing ==
All lyrics are written by Aiko Kitahara

No.	Title	Music	Arrangers	Length
1.	"Tango"	Akihito Tokunaga (Doa)	MissTy	3:47
2.	"Moshi mo Umare Kawattara Mou Ichido Aishitekuremasuka?" (もしも生まれ変わったら もう一度 愛してくれますか?)	Yasutaka Nakajima (Spica)	Spica	4:26
3.	"Mou Ichido Kimi ni Koishiteiru" (もう一度 君に恋している)	Michiya Haruhata (Tube)	Kouichi Chou	3:54
4.	"Sennen no Inochi Yori mo Kyou Kono Hi no Shiawase wo" (千年の命よりも今日この日の幸せを)	Nami Kaneko	corin.	4:17
5.	"Season"	Masazumi Ozawa (ex. Pamelah)	Ozawa	4:00
6.	"Daijoubu" (ダイジョウブ)	Ozawa	Ozawa	4:14
7.	"Ashita wa Kitto Hareru ya" (明日はきっと晴れるや)	Koichi Takada	Akiyuki Tateyama (THE LINDA!)	3:50
8.	"Dream☆ing"	Tokunaga	Ryou Hayashi (organs café)	4:47
9.	"Epilogue" (エピローグ)	Kouji Gotou	Gotou	3:48
10.	"Te Quiero Te Amo ~Natsu no Natsu no Koi~" (テ・ケロ テ・アモ 〜夏の夏の恋〜)	Yoshinobu Ohga (OOM)	Ohga	4:27
11.	"Mata Aou ne" (あの頃の君でいて)	Kazunobu Mashima (ex. Ramjet Pulley)	Ozawa	3:59
12.	"Sea"	Naohisa Miyazaki	Takashi Masuzaki (Dimension)	5:19

== In media ==
- Tango – ending theme for Anime television series Fighting Beauty Wulong
  - opening theme for Chiba TV program MU-GEN〜Music Generations〜
- Mou Ichido Kimi ni Koishiteiru – ending theme for Anime television series Government Crime Investigation Agent Zaizen Jotaro
- Moshi mo Umare Kawattara Mou Ichido Aishitekuremasuka? – opening theme for Chiba TV program MU-GEN〜Music Generations〜
- Dream☆ing – theme song for Ohsaka's Commercial facility EST (West Japan Railway Company)
- Te Quiero Te Amo ~Natsu no Natsu no Koi~ - ending theme for Nihon TV program Himitsu no Hiramekin
