= Secret & Lies =

EP by U-ka Saegusa in dB
- Released: 5 February 2003
- Genre: J-pop
- Length: 32:00
- Label: Giza Studio
- Producer: Kannonji

U-ka Saegusa in dB chronology
Secret & Lies (2003)	U-ka saegusa IN db 1st ~Kimi to Yakusoku Shita Yasashii Ano Basho made~ (2003)

Singles from Secret & Lies
- 1. "Whenever I Think of You" Released: 12 June 2002; 2. "It's for You" Released: 28 August 2002; 3. "Tears Go by" Released: 6 November 2002

Secret & Lies is the debut extended play (EP) by Japanese pop band U-ka Saegusa in dB, released on 5 February 2003 by Giza Studio. The album peaked at number twenty on the Oricon weekly albums chart and has sold over 30,111 copies nationwide.

== Singles ==
"Whenever I Think of You" was released on 12 June 2002 as the lead single. The single reached number forty-one in Japan and has sold over 6,580 copies nationwide. The song served as the theme songs to the Japanese anime television series, Cheeky Angel. "Whenever I Think of You" was covered and recorded by the song's writer, Akihito Tokunaga for his first studio album, Route 109 (2020).

== Track listing ==
CD
No.	Title	Writer(s)	Arranger	Length
1.	"Graduation"	U-ka Saegusa; Yuri Nakamura	Akihito Tokunaga	4:22
2.	"It's for You"	U-ka Saegusa; Daria Kawashima	Daisuke Ikeda	4:44
3.	"Secret & Lies"	U-ka Saegusa; Yuri Godai	Tokunaga	4:28
4.	"Tears Go by"	U-ka Saegusa; Aika Ohno	Tokunaga	3:53
5.	"Whenever I Think of You"	U-ka Saegusa; Tokunaga	Tokunaga	5:01
6.	"Happy Birthday to You"	U-ka Saegusa; Terukado	Akira	3:56
7.	"Stay My Dream"	U-ka Saegusa; Miki Matsuhashi	Masazumi Ozawa	4:02
8.	"Whenever I Think of You" (TV Version)	Saegusa; Tokunaga	Tokunaga	1:34
Total length:				32:00

== Charts ==
Chart (2003)	Peak position
Japanese Albums (Oricon)	20
