= Niiyama =

Niiyama (written: 新山) mean New mountain is a Japanese surname. Notable people with the surname include:

- Chiharu Niiyama (新山 千春, born 1981), Japanese actress and gravure idol
- Shiho Niiyama (新山 志保, 1970–2000), Japanese voice actress
- Shiori Niiyama (新山 詩織, born 1996), Japanese singer and songwriter
