= June Bride ~Anata shika Mienai~ =

2005 single by U-ka Saegusa in dB

Single by U-ka Saegusa in dB

from the album U-ka saegusa IN db III
- B-side: "Donna ni Ashita ga Mienakutemo" "Bokura no Kodoku na Game"
- Released: June 15, 2005
- Genre: J-pop; anime song
- Length: 5:09
- Label: Giza Studio
- Songwriter(s): U-ka Saegusa; Akihito Tokunaga
- Producer(s): Kannonji

U-ka Saegusa in dB singles chronology
"Tobitatenai Watashi ni Anata ga Tsubasa wo Kureta" (2005)	"June Bride ~Anata shika Mienai~" (2005)	"Kimi no Ai ni Tsutsumarete Itai" (2005)

"June Bride ~Anata shika Mienai~" (ジューンブライド ～あなたしか見えない～; lit. "June Bride ~All I See Is You~") is a song by Japanese pop rock band U-ka Saegusa in dB. It was released on 15 June 2005 through Giza Studio, as the second single from their third studio album U-ka saegusa IN db III. The single reached number twelve in Japan and has sold over 21,712 copies nationwide. The song served as one of the theme songs to the Japanese anime television series, Case Closed.

== Track listing ==
CD single
No.	Title	Writer(s)	Arranger(s)	Length
1.	"June Bride ~Anata shika Mienai~"	U-ka Saegusa; Akihito Tokunaga	Tokunaga	5:09
2.	"Donna ni Ashita ga Mienakutemo"	Saegusa; Aika Ohno	Masazumi Ozawa	3:04
3.	"Bokura no Kodoku na Game"	Saegusa; Koji Goto	Goto	4:01
4.	"June Bride ~Anata shika Mienai~" (TV Version)	Saegusa; Tokunaga	Tokunaga	1:29
5.	"June Bride ~Anata shika Mienai~" (Instrumental)	Saegusa; Tokunag	Tokunaga	5:08

== Cover version ==
"June Bride ~Anata shika Mienai~" was covered by Asami Imai, Yumi Hara, and Manami Numakura in 2011. This version was included on the compilation album, The Idolmaster Station!!! Third Travel Wanted (2011).

== Charts ==
Chart (2005)	Peak position
Japan (Oricon)	12

== Certification and sales ==
Region	Certification	Certified units/sales
Japan (RIAJ)	None	21,712

== Release history ==
Region	Date	Format	Catalogue Num.	Label	Ref.
Japan	15 June 2005	CD	GZCA-4043	Giza Studio	
