= It's for You (disambiguation) =

"It's for You" is a song recorded by Cilla Black in 1964 and written by Paul McCartney and John Lennon.

It's for You may also refer to:

- "It's for You" (Shanice song) (1993)
- "It's for You" (Niamh Kavanagh song) (2010)
- It's for You (U-ka Saegusa in dB song), 2002
- "It's for You", a song by Player (1980)
- "It's For You", an instrumental by Pat Metheny and Lyle Mays on the album As Falls Wichita, So Falls Wichita Falls (1981)
- "It's for You", a song by Three Dog Night from the self-titled album (1968)

== See also ==
- It's for You, North Dakota U
