= Message (Aiko Kitahara album) =

Studio album by Aiko Kitahara
- Released: May 11, 2005
- Recorded: 2004–2005
- Genre: J-pop
- Length: 48:15
- Label: Giza Studio
- Producer: Daiko Nagato

Aiko Kitahara chronology
Piece of Love (2003)	Message (2005)	Sea (2006)

Singles from Message
- 1. "Omoide ni Sukuwaretemo" Released: March 24, 2004; 2. "Da Da Da" Released: July 28, 2004; 3. "Fuyu Urara" Released: February 9, 2005

Message is the second studio album by Japanese singer and songwriter Aiko Kitahara. It was released on May 11, 2005, through Giza Studio.

The album consists of three previous released singles, such as Omoide ni Sukuwaretemo (思い出にスクワレテモ), Da Da Da and Fuyu Urara (冬うらら). Omoide ni Sukuwaretemo had received renewed version under title album mix.

The album charted at #41 on the Oricon charts in its first week. It charted for two weeks.

== Track listing ==
All lyrics are written by Aiko Kitahara

No.	Title	Music	Arrangers	Length
1.	"Omoide ni Sukuwaretemo -album mix-" (思い出にスクワレテモ -album mix-)	Makoto Miyoshi (ex. Rumania Montevideo)	Daisuke Ikeda	4:40
2.	"Da Da Da"	Akihito Tokunaga (doa)	Tokunaga	3:15
3.	"Message"	Miho Komatsu	Susumu Mameda	4:37
4.	"Fuyu Urara" (冬うらら)	Aika Ohno	Takashi Hayama	4:32
5.	"Itsumo" (いつも)	Kazunobu Mashima (ex. Ramjet Pulley)	Tokunaga	3:39
6.	"Unmei da toka Kiseki da toka Shinjitai Kibun" (運命だとか奇跡だとか信じたい気分)	Masazumi Ozawa (ex. Pamelah)	Ozawa	4:13
7.	"Modorenai Ano Hi" (戻れないあの日)	Tokunaga	Tokunaga	5:10
8.	"Break down"	Mashima	Ozawa	3:13
9.	"Love is blind?!"	Daria Kawashima	Susumu Mameda	4:19
10.	"Kimi no Egao ga Suki dakara" (君の笑顔が好きだから)	Mashima	Ozawa	3:36
11.	"Ano Koro no Kimi de ite" (あの頃の君でいて)	Ozawa	Ozawa	3:27
12.	"Hands up!!"	Hiroshi Terao (ex. Soul Crusaders)	Hirohito Furui (Garnet Crow)	3:27

== In media ==
- Omoide ni Sukuwaretemo – ending theme for Yomiuri TV program Pro no Doumyaku.
- Da Da Da – ending theme for Tokyo Broadcasting System Television program Sunday Japan
- Message – ending theme for Nihon TV program Sekai! Chou Mane Kenkyuusho
- Fuyu Urara – ending theme for Tokyo Broadcasting System Television program 8 Ji desu! Minna no Mondai
