= Miki Matsuhashi =

Japanese former singer and songwriter (born 1983)

Miki Matsuhashi 松橋未樹
- Born: August 10, 1983 (age 41); Shinsaibashi, Osaka, Japan
- Genres: Japanese pop
- Occupation: Singer
- Years active: 2000–2003
- Labels: Giza Studio

Miki Matsuhashi (松橋 未樹, Matsuhashi Miki) (born August 10, 1983) is a Japanese former singer and songwriter who was active between 2000 and 2003. She achieved national recognition for singing the theme song to the Japanese anime series Case Closed, "Destiny".

Matsuhashi had a fairly brief career as an artist. She made indies debut in the summer of 2000, releasing first extended play Miki Matsuhashi. Her debut single, "Time Stands Still" was released in June 2001, and her debut studio album, Destiny, was released in less than a year later. In 2001, Matsuhashi released "Destiny", a cover of Ramjet Pulley as the second single from the album. The single became Matsuhashi's most successful single, reaching number 22 on the Oricon charts. The song was used as the opening theme song for the anime, Detective Conan, She had a few collaborations with other artists from Giza Studio label, including U-ka Saegusa. Matsuhashi has been on hiatus from the music scene since 2003. During her three-year career, Matsuhashi released one studio album, one extended plays and three singles.

== Discography ==
=== Albums ===
List of EPs, with selected details, chart positions
Title	Album details	Peak chart positions
Title	Album details	JPN
Destiny	Released: 30 January 2002; Label: Giza Studio; Format: CD, digital download	45

=== Extended plays ===
List of EPs, with selected details, chart positions
Title	Album details
Miki Matsuhashi	Released: 2000; Label: Self-released; Format: Cassette

=== Singles ===
Year	Single	Peak chart positions	Album
Year	Single	JPN	Album
2001	"Time Stands Still"	81	Destiny
2001	"Destiny"	22	Destiny
2001	"Itsumademo Ai wo Tsutumou"	91	Destiny

=== Songwriting credits ===
Year	Artist	Title	Album
2003	U-ka saegusa IN db	"Stay My Dream"	Secret & Lies
