= Rosetta: The Masked Angel =

Japanese television series

Rosetta: The Masked Angel (仮面天使ロゼッタ, Kamen Tenshi Rozetta; Masked Angel Rosetta) is a Japanese tokusatsu drama from Tsuburaya Entertainment that aired from July 4 to September 26, 1998 on TV Tokyo. It featured the adventures of a young girl named Asuka Jin who follows in her father's footsteps as Rosetta to battle evil monsters called Duats (デュアトス, Dyuatosu). The series' motif was that of Ancient Egypt.

== Characters ==
- Asuka Jin (Masked Angel Rosetta) (神あすか（仮面天使ロゼッタ）, Jin Asuka (Kamen Tenshi Rozetta)): Asuka Jin uses the power of the Ankh-Cross (アンクロス, Ankurosu) to call on the power of Horus and assume her Hazard Form (ハザードフォーム, Hazādo Fōmu) as the Masked Angel Rosetta.
- Kenichiro Jin (God-Mask Pharaon) (神健一郎（神仮面ファラオン）, Jin Ken'ichirō (Jin Kamen Faraon): Asuka's father who fought the Duat prior to the series. He uses the Ankh-Cross Eye (アンクロス・アイ, Ankurosu Ai) to assume his Hazard Form as the God-Mask Pharaon.
- Atsuko Jin (神敦子, Jin Atsuko): Asuka's mother.
- Natsumi Kudō (工藤夏美, Kudō Natsumi): One of Asuka's best friends.
- Midori Fujisaki (藤崎みどり, Fujisaki Midori): One of Asuka's best friends
- Boss Daimonji (大文字課長, Daimonji Kachō)
- Leader Yasuno (安野部長, Yasuno Buchō)
- Jō (錠, Jō)

=== Duat ===
Demons that existed alongside humans in secret, feeding on them. It's the task of those from the Jin bloodline to combat the monsters and protect humanity.

- Majin-Mask Duanubis/Jō (魔神仮面デュアヌビス, Majin Kamen Dyuanubisu; 12 & 13): A Duat who bears a grudge on Pharaon for a humiliating defeat decades ago. He obtains the Death Cross Eye to exact his revenge on his rival.
- Vampire Bat Majo Brabat (吸血蝙蝠魔女ブラバット, Kyūketsu Kōmorimajo Burabatto; 1): A Duat in the form of a young woman whose actions were reported in the newspaper. She attempted to destroy Pharaon for interfering in her feeding by using his daughter as leverage, though Asuka thought Brabat was her father's secret mistress until it was too late. However, Brabat ended up being the first killed by Rosetta.
- Scorpion Majin Thundares (蠍魔人サンダレス, Sasorimajin Sandaresu; 2 & 12): Posed as a model director, he targeted women.
- Queen Ant Majo Gysalien (女王蟻魔女ギサリアン, Joōarimajo Gisarian; 3 & 12): Posed as a dominatrix. She kidnapped Asuka and her mother to capture Pharaon, but she ends up fighting Rosetta instead.
- Butterfly Majo Aginahsa (蝶魔女アギナーサ, Chōmajo Agināsa; 4): Posing as a diet-expert, she sold what she claimed to be experimental diet pills to weight-conscious girls. But in reality, the pills were seeds that bloom into flowers within the girls' bodies. They would then be kidnapped by Aginahsa and placed in her "flower garden" for nourishment. Among the victims were three coworkers of a young woman Jin befriend. When said lady went to visit them, Aginahsa uses deception and an aerosol can to kidnap her, force-feeding her seeds. Pharaon attempts to fight her, but he was too tired from searching, and was overpowered until Rosetta arrived to distract the monster so her father can kill her with his Pharaon God Punch attack.
- Cricket Majin Guelygrass (蟋蟀魔人ギリグラス, Kōrogimajin Girigurasu; 5 & 12): Though not a good fighter, he had an advantage in high-jumping moves. Posing as a guitarist, he used his hypnotic power to lure sleeping high school girls to him, feeding on his "cute prey" after liquefying them. His playing attracted Asuka's attention, finding his victims' remains. The next day, Guelygrass gets the half-tired Natsumi and Midori under his spell, with Asuka following. She chases him out and kill him within thirty seconds once he sprains his foot.
- Mantis Majo Madam Mantis (蟷螂魔女マダムマンティス, Kamakirimajo Madamu Mantisu; 6 & 12): Assumed the identity of Satsuki, a widowed woman with a thing for younger men. Satsuki attracted these men to her lodge in the middle of the woods, using her charms to make them her "husbands", allowing them to live until a new "husband" comes before eating one of them to maintain her beauty. Her latest victim was Ryou, Midori's senpai from middle school. Once Ryou enters her lodge, Satsuki murders Yamamoto in the dead of night before placing Ryou under her spell. However, when Midori uncovered the truth, she attempted to get him out, only to be halted by Katagiri and Tominaga, who were disposed before Satsuki took matters to her own hands, revealing her true form. But though frighten, Midori refuse to give up until she succumbed to the mickey she was given earlier. But Rosetta arrived to save her friend and took over fighting the Duat. Once hit by Rosetta's Endless Illusion attack, Satsuki was overwhelmed by the mirage of being surrounded by men, leaving her open to a fatal blow to the head.
- Frog Majo Frogel (蛙魔女フローゲル, Kaerumajo Furōgeru; 7): A somewhat goofy Duat, she covers corpses with her revival mud to create her personal army of zombies to avenge her race's genocide. However, her recent recruit was Yanaka, an incompetent worker at Jin's company who died. While in the middle of training her army, Yanaka wanders off to fix his mistake and give his final thoughts to Jin. When she found him, Frogel thought Asuka kidnapped him, summoning her zombies to kill her while using Yanaka as a hostage. But Frogel gets hit by Pharaon's shuriken before he and Rosetta finish off the zombies. Frogel tries to fake begging for mercy, but receive the end of God Punch, sending her in the air with Rosetta dealing the deathblow.
- Great Centipede Majin Handleg (大百足魔人ハンドレッグ, Daimukademajin Handoreggu; 8): 13 years ago, a Centipede Majo impregnated its egg into Tsuchida's body. Over time, the egg hatched and assumed the form of Mika Tsuchida, a seemingly sick girl with asthma. As Mika, Handleg befriended Jin while relying on Tsuchida to survive. But once old enough to fend for himself, Handleg revealed his true form after sucking out his foster mother's blood. Pharaon fought Handleg, reluctantly killing the Duat with his bare hands.
- Tiger Lily Majo Echoleanu (鬼百合魔女エコレーヌ, Oniyurimajo Ekorēnu; 9) Assumed the identity of a shy attractive girl named Kyoumi Nohara. Using her guise, Echoleanu befriended the ghost of Yuri Nohara who believed Echoleanu was a protector of the forest she loves. When she arrived to the woods, Echoleanu runs off when Jin and Asuka arrive to halt her feeding. The two later fight the Duat until Yuri arrives to save Echoleanu, promising she wouldn't harm humans ever again. This forces Rosetta to hesitate, giving Echoleanu an advantage on Pharaon. But in the end, Rosetta helped her father kill Echoleanu much to Yuri's dismay, who spirited the Duat's body away in disgust.
- Dream Majin Mister Balloon (夢魔人ミスター・バルーン, Yumemajin Misutā Barūn; 10): The most human of the Duats, dressed a mime, Mister Balloon could spit acid bubbles, move fast, and claimed himself immortal as long as human desire exists. Using his power, he gives his balloons off to people, along with a note to write down whatever they wish for. Asuka and her friends were among those to get their wishes to come true: Natsumi as a superstar, Midori being Ryou's wife, and Asuka as a mother. However, in the long run, the wishes turn into living nightmares. When they all realized the truth and were cornered by Mister Balloon, Asuka was forced to transform in front of her friends to fight. She uses her Rosetta Queen to distract the Duat long enough for Midori and Natsumi to hold him for the deathblow. Soon after girls shrug off the whole event as just a dream.
- Young Tiger Majin Ghulzet/Jō (青虎魔人ガルゼット, Shiitora Majin Guruzetto; 11) Jō's original duat form before he becomes Majin-Mask Duanubis.
- Venomous Snake Majo Cobrad (毒蛇魔女コブラッド, Dokuhebi Majo Koburaddo; 12) Posed as a medical room teacher in Asuka's school, killed by Rosetta.

== Episodes ==
1. The Masked Angel (仮面の天使, Kamen no Tenshi): written by Takahiko Masuda, directed by Mitsunori Hattori
2. Blood Fate (血の宿命, Chi no Shukumei): written by Takahiko Masuda, directed by Mitsunori Hattori
3. The Heart's Awakening (心の覚醒, Kokoro no Kakusei): written by Tsuyoshi Koike, directed by Iwao Takahashi
4. Nightmarish Human Garden (人間畑の悪夢, Ningen Hatake no Akumu): written by Tsuyoshi Koike, directed by Iwao Takahashi
5. Decisive Battle of the Final Exam (決戦の期末テスト, Kessen no Kimatsu Tesuto): written by Atsushi Maekawa, directed by Mikio Hirota
6. The Widow's Lodge of Terror (戦慄の未亡人下宿, Senritsu no Mibōjin Geshuku): written by Atsushi Maekawa, directed by Mikio Hirota
7. Missing Corpse (迷子の死体, Maigo no Shitai): written by Hiroshi Sugano, directed by Mitsunori Hattori
8. Temporary Housing (仮の宿, Kari no Yado): written by Hiroshi Sugano, directed by Mitsunori Hattori
9. Screaming Woods (森の叫び, Mori no Sakebi): written by Katsumasa Shinma, directed by Mitsunori Hattori
10. Rosy Life (バラ色の人生, Barairo no Jinsei): written by Katsumasa Shinma, directed by Kenzo Maihara
11. Port Town of the Red Evening Sun (赤い夕陽の港街, Akai Yūhi no Minato Gai): written by Tsuyoshi Koike, directed by Kenzo Maihara
12. Fated Confrontation (宿命の対決, Shukumei no Taiketsu): written by Tsuyoshi Koike, directed by Atsushi Shimizu
13. Final Day (最期の日, Saigo no Hi): written by Kazuya Hatazawa and Rima Nozoe, directed by Atsushi Shimizu

== Music ==
Opening theme
"I FEEL YOU" by D.Shade
Ending theme
"Kizuna" (キズナ) by Pamelah

== Original Video Production ==
A direct to video film titled Rosetta: The Masked Angel: Rosetta vs. Freia (仮面天使ロゼッタ 漆黒のフレイア, Kamen Tenshi Rozetta: Shikkoku no Fureia; Masked Angel Rosetta: Jet-Black Freia) was produced and introduced Mae Yoshikawa (吉川 茉絵, Yoshikawa Mae) as the Masked Angel Freia (仮面天使フレイア, Kamen Tenshi Fureia), an evil Masked Angel.

=== Music ===
Opening theme
"Kamen Tenshi Rosetta" (仮面天使ロゼッタ, Kamen Tenshi Rozetta) by Rei Yoshii & Mae Yoshikawa
Ending theme
"Cool-Girl" by Rei Yoshii

=== Staff ===
- Written by Rima Nozoe
- Directed by Atsushi Shimizu

== Cast ==
- Asuka Jin / Rosetta: Rei Yoshii (吉井 怜, Yoshii Rei)
- Kenichiro Jin / Pharaon: Tetsuya Ushio (潮 哲也, Ushio Tetsuya)
- Atsuko Jin: Shigeri Higuchi (樋口しげり, Higuchi Shigeri)
- Natsumi Kudō: Akiko Sugawara (菅原晶子, Sugawara Akiko)
- Midori Fujisaki: Ayako Honda (本多彩子, Honda Ayako)
- Boss Daimonji: Takeshi Sasaki (佐々木剛, Sasaki Takeshi)
- Leader Yasuno: Yuriko Hishimi (ひし美ゆり子, Hishimi Yuriko)
- Jō / Duanubis: Ryū Kanō (加納竜, Kanō Ryū)
