= Piece of Love =

Piece of love

Studio album by Aiko Kitahara
- Released: November 19, 2003
- Recorded: 2002–2003
- Genre: J-pop
- Length: 45:11
- Label: Giza Studio
- Producer: Kanonji

Aiko Kitahara chronology
Piece of love (2003)	Message (2005)

Singles from Piece of Love
- 1. "grand blue" Released: May 29, 2002; 2. "Sun rise train/Kimi wo Egaku Sono Mirai" Released: November 6, 2002; 3. "Himawari no You ni" Released: June 4, 2003; 4. "Nijiiro ni Hikaru Umi" Released: August 6, 2003; 5. "special Days!!" Released: September 25, 2003

Piece of Love is the debut studio album by Japanese singer and songwriter Aiko Kitahara. It was released on November 19, 2003, through Giza Studio.

== Album ==
The album consists of five previous released singles, such as grand blue, Sun rise train/Kimi wo Egaku Sono Mirai (Sun rise train/君の描くその未来), Himawari no You ni (向日葵のように), Nijiiro ni Hikaru Umi (虹色にひかる海) and special days!!. Special days had received renewed version under title album mix.

== Reception ==
The album charted at #50 on the Oricon charts in its first week. It charted for two weeks sold more than 4,000 copies.

== Track listing ==
All lyrics are written by Aiko Kitahara

No.	Title	Music	Arrangers	Length
1.	"Ashita Haruka Tooi Umi ni Tadoritsukeru you ni" (明日遥か遠い海に辿り着けるように)	Makoto Miyoshi (ex. Rumania Montevideo)	Masazumi Ozawa (ex. Pamelah)	4:25
2.	"Grand blue"	Akihito Tokunaga	Tokunaga	4:00
3.	"Nijiiro ni Hikaru Umi" (虹色にひかる海)	Michiya Haruhata (Tube)	Tokunaga	4:27
4.	"Himawari no You ni" (向日葵のように)	Ozawa	Ozawa	4:32
5.	"Sayonara wo Ageta Hi ga Chikasugite" (サヨナラを告げた日が近すぎて)	Daria Kawashima	Toshiya Shimizu	3:27
6.	"Kindan no Kajitsu" (禁断の果実)	Ozawa	Ozawa	4:08
7.	"Sun rise train"	Terukado	Yoshinobu Ohga (ex. nothin' but love)	3:25
8.	"Yuki Furu Yoru wa Dakishimete" (雪降る夜は抱きしめて)	Ozawa	Ozawa	4:04
9.	"Ame no Naka" (雨の中)	Ozawa	Ozawa	3:39
10.	"Special Days!!" (album mix)	Ozawa	Ozawa	4:26
11.	"Hana Saku Michi" (花咲く道)	Hitoshi Okamoto (Garnet Crow)	Okamoto	4:44

== In media ==
- grand blue – opening theme for Anime television series Tenshi na Konamaiki
- Sun rise train – opening theme for Anime television series Tenshi na Konamaiki
- Nijiiro ni Hikaru Umi – ending theme for Anime television series Tantei Gakuen Q
- Himawari no You ni – ending theme for Nihon TV program Mogu Mogu Gombo
- special days!! – ending theme for Yomiuri TV program Pro no Doumyaku.
