= Shanti (Aiko Kitahara album) =

Studio album by Aiko Kitahara
- Released: September 26, 2007
- Recorded: 2006–2007
- Genre: J-pop
- Length: 49:05
- Label: Giza Studio
- Producer: Kanonji

Aiko Kitahara chronology
Sea (2006)	Shanti (2007)	Aiko Kitahara Best (2009)

Singles from Sea
- 1. "Mou Kokoro Yuretarishinaide" Released: November 1, 2006; 2. "Sekaijuu Doko wo Sagashitemo" Released: March 21, 2007; 3. "Samba Night" Released: April 22, 2007

Shanti is the fourth and the last studio album by Japanese singer and songwriter Aiko Kitahara. It was released on September 26, 2007, through Giza Studio. The album title "Shanti" means “ peace” in the Sanskrit language.

== Album ==
The album consists of three previous released singles, such as Mou Kokoro Yuretarishinaide (もう心揺れたりしないで), Sekaijuu Doko wo Sagashitemo (世界中どこを探しても) and Samba Night.

Two tracks out of twelve were composed by Aiko herself. First press release included special photobook Photo MessageIII. A special website was launched to promote album.

== Reception ==
The album charted at #87 on the Oricon charts in its first week. It charted for two weeks.

== Track listing ==
All lyrics are written by Aiko Kitahara

No.	Title	Music	Arrangers	Length
1.	"Sekaijuu Doko wo Sagashitemo" (世界中どこを探しても)	Aiko Kitahara	Takeshi Hayama	3:21
2.	"Mou Kokoro Yuretarishinaide" (もう心揺れたりしないで)	Aiko Kitahara	Hirohito Furui (Garnet Crow)	4:20
3.	"Koi Hanabi" (恋花火)	Masazumi Ozawa (ex.Pamelah)	Akiyuki Tateyama (THE LINDA!)	3:29
4.	"Utopia" (ユートピア)	Kazuhito Tsukui	Takeshi Hayama	4:08
5.	"Arigatou" (ありがとう)	Yasutaka Nakajima (Spica)	Spica	3:54
6.	"Kono Sora no Shita de" (この空の下で)	Masaaki Watanuki	Masaaki Watanuki	5:06
7.	"Kaze no Melody" (風のメロディー)	Hiya & Katsuma	Spica	4:33
8.	"Hontou no Kimochi" (本当の気持ち)	Akiyuki Tateyama	Akiyuki Tateyama	4:08
9.	"La-i-La"	Akiyuki Tateyama	Akiyuki Tateyama	4:25
10.	"Crazy ↑↑↑"	Akiyuki Tateyama	Akiyuki Tateyama	3:34
11.	"SAMBA NIGHT"	Ryou Hayashi (organs café)	Ryou Hayashi	4:36
12.	"Surfing in the Heaven ♡×♡"	Shinya Hata	Kouichi Chou	3:39

== In media ==
- Mou Kokoro Yuretarishinaide - 7th ending theme for Anime television series MÄR
- Sekaijuu Doko wo Sagashitemo – ending theme for Anime television series Kekkaishi
- SAMBA NIGHT – theme song for Tokyo Broadcasting System Television program Doors 2007
