= It's a Wonderful Feeling =

Studio album by Ramjet Pulley
- Released: January 29, 2003
- Recorded: 2002–2003
- Genre: J-pop
- Length: 47:17
- Label: Giza
- Producer: Ramjet Pulley

Ramjet Pulley chronology
A Cup of Day (2001)	It's a Wonderful Feeling (2003)

Singles from It's a Wonderful Feeling
- 1. "Change the World" Released: 17 April 2002; 2. "Flower" Released: 7 August 2002

It's a Wonderful Feeling is the second and final studio album by J-pop band Ramjet Pulley. It was released on January 29, 2003, under the Giza Studio label. This is the last work released by Ramjet Pulley. Since then they've been on unannounced indefinite hiatus.

== Promotion ==
The album consists of two previously released final singles, such as Change The World and Flower. While Change the World didn't receive any commercial promotion, the final single Flower was used as an ending theme for Nihon TV program The Sunday. The album track everything was used as a commercial television song of Dome.

The single Change The World has received new remix track under subtitle 80.5 remix by Akira. Find My Way is a coupling song from their fifth single. Three songs out of fourteen are instrumentals by Japanese arranger Satoru Kobayashi.

Both of the leading singles were recorded with full music videoclip and are included in the label's compilation album Giza Studio Masterpiece Blend 2002 and I'll fall in love again in Giza Studio Masterpiece Blend 2003.

== Commercial performance ==
The album charted #84 rank on Oricon for first week with 3,014 sold copies. The album charted for two weeks and totally sold 4,357 copies.

== Track listing ==
All lyrics are written by Satomi Makoshi; all music is composed by Kazunobu Mashima

No.	Title	Length
1.	"Change The World"	3:28
2.	"Flower"	3:25
3.	"Sha lala ~Shiawase na Uta~ (シアラ・ルアラ〜幸せの歌〜)"	3:33
4.	"A Day Remember" (Instrumental)	1:00
5.	"Harukana Toki wo Koete (遥かな時をコエテ)"	4:32
6.	"Find My Way"	3:17
7.	"Flow" (Instrumental)	1:13
8.	"It's a Wonderful Feeling"	4:27
9.	"Everything"	4:16
10.	"I'll Be There"	3:39
11.	"Raving Through The Night" (Instrumental)	0:41
12.	"3.3.3"	4:00
13.	"I'll Fall In Love Again"	5:13
14.	"Change The World" (80.5 remix)	4:35

== Personnel ==
Credits adapted from the CD booklet of It's a Wonderful Feeling.

- Akiko Matsuda - vocals
- Satomi Makoshi - songwriting
- Kazunobu Mashima - composing
- Satoru Kobayashi - arranging
- Rubik's cube - remixing
- Akira - remixing
- Yosuke Nishimura - recording engineer
- Katsuo Urano - recording engineer
- Akio Nakajima - mixing engineer
- Taku Oyabu - mixing engineer
- Masahiro Shimada - mastering engineer
- Noriko Ohgami – art direction
- Kanonji - producing
