= U-ka saegusa IN db II =

Studio album by U-ka Saegusa in dB
- Released: November 17, 2004
- Recorded: 2004
- Genre: J-Pop
- Length: 50:06
- Label: Giza Studio
- Producer: CHOKAKU

U-ka Saegusa in dB chronology
U-ka saegusa IN db 1st ~Kimi to Yakusoku Shita Yasashii Ano Basho made~ (2003)	U-ka saegusa IN db II (2004)	U-ka saegusa IN db III (2006)

Singles from U-ka saegusa IN db II
- 1. "Nemuru Kimi no Yokogao ni Hohoemi wo" Released: March 3, 2004; 2. "Hekonda Kimochi Tokasu Kimi" Released: August 11, 2004; 3. "Egao de Iyouyo" Released: September 15, 2004; 4. "Itsuka Kokoro ni Taiyou wo" Released: October 13, 2004

U-ka saegusa IN db II is the second studio album by Japanese group U-ka Saegusa in dB. The album was released on November 17, 2004 under Giza Studio label.

== Background ==
The album includes 4 previously released singles since Nemuru Kimi no Yokogao ni Hohoemi wo till Itsuka Kokoro ni Taiyou wo. The composer of Egao de Iyouyo, Aika Ohno self-cover this single in her cover album Silent Passage.

== Charting performance ==
The album reached #23 rank in Oricon for first week. It charted for 4 weeks and totally sold 20,814 copies.

== Track listing ==
All lyrics are written by Yuka Saegusa

No.	Title	Music	Arrangers	Length
1.	"Itsuka Kokoro ni Taiyou wo" (いつも心に太陽を)	Yuka Saegusa	Masazumi Ozawa (ex.Pamelah)
2.	"Nemuru Kimi no Yokogao ni Hohoemi wo" (眠る君の横顔に微笑みを)	Aika Ohno	Ozawa
3.	"Kokoro ga Tomaranai" (ココロが止まらない, originally performed by "Jewelry")	Ohno	Akihito Tokunaga
4.	"Mune Ippai no Kono Ai wo Dare yori Kimi ni" (胸いっぱいのこの愛を 誰より君に)	Ohno	Ozawa
5.	"Seishun no Sora" (青春の空)	Seiichirou Iwai	Satoru Kobayashi
6.	"Hekonda Kimochi Tokasu Kimi" (へこんだ気持ち 溶かすキミ)	Ohno	Ozawa
7.	"Egao de Iyouyo" (笑顔でいようよ)	Ohno	Ozawa
8.	"Sago no Kiss wa Mizu no you ni Tsumetakatta" (最後のキスは氷のように冷たかった)	Yuri Godai	Hirohito Furui (Garnet Crow)
9.	"Fuki susabu Kaze no Naka de" (吹きすさぶ風の中で, originally performed by "WAG")	Tokunaga	Ozawa
10.	"Watashi wo Yurusanaide" (私を許さないで)	Miho Komatsu	Gotou Niji
11.	"Hand to Hand"	Ohno	Ozawa
12.	"Kimi no Heart ni Mune Kyun 2" (君のハートに胸キュン②)	Seiichirou Iwai	Niji

== Usage in media ==
- The song Nemuru Kimi no Yokogao ni Hohoemi wo was used as ending theme for Anime television Detective Conan
- The song Itsuka Kokoro ni Taiyou wo was used as ending theme for program Ultraman Nexus aired at Tokyo Broadcasting System Television
- The song Hekonda Kimochi Tokasu Kimi was used as ending theme for program TV oja Manbou aired at Nippon TV
- The song Egao de Iyouyo was used as ending theme for program AX MUSIC-TV aired at Nippon TV
