= Hello Goodbye (Shiori Niiyama album) =

Studio album by Shiori Niiyama
- Released: 17 June 2015
- Recorded: 2014–2015
- Genre: Japanese pop
- Length: 51 minutes
- Label: Being
- Producer: Masanori Sasaji

Shiori Niiyama chronology
Shiori (2014)	Hello Goodbye (2015)	Finder no Mukou (2016)

Singles from Hello Goodbye
- 1. "Zettai" Released: 3 December 2014; 2. "Arigatou" Released: 18 March 2015

Hello Goodbye (ハローグッバイ) is the second studio album by Japanese singer Shiori Niiyama. It was released on 17 June 2015 under Being label. Album includes previous 2 released singles. The album reached #32 rank first week. Album charted for 3 weeks.

== Track listing ==
All songs were written by Shiori Niiyama

No.	Title	Music	Arrangers	Length
1.	"Winding Road"	Yusuke Kato	Masanori Sasaji	4:13
2.	"Sunny Day"	Hiroki Horiko	Masanori Sasaji	3:30
3.	"Zettai" (絶対)	Shiori Niiyama	Masanori Sasaji	4:19
4.	"Dear Friend"	Manaka Suzuki and 7th avenue	Masanori Sasaji	3:27
5.	"Suki nanoni" (好きなのに)	Kenta Natsukuma	Masanori Sasaji	4:27
6.	"Kimagure" (気まぐれ)	Shiori Takei	Masanori Sasaji	3:30
7.	"Kira Kira" (きらきら)	Shiori Niiyama	Shiori Niiyama	4:37
8.	"Wakatteru yo" (分かってるよ(band ver.))	Shiori Niiyama	Masanori Sasaji	4:44
9.	"Shiori no R & R" (しおりのR & R)	Masanori Sasaji	Masanori Sasaji	3:50
10.	"Arigatou" (ありがとう)	Yosuke Yamashita	Yosuke Yamashita	4:39
11.	"Film" (フィルム)	Atsushi Yamaguchi (ex. Naifu)	Masanori Sasaji	4:17
12.	"Hello"	Takanori Fujimoto	Masanori Sasaji	4:37

== In media ==
- Kira Kira was used as insert song for movie Yorisou
- Zettai was used as ending theme for Tokyo Broadcasting System Television program "King's Brunch" (Oujisama no Brunch)
- Wakatteru yo was used as theme song for short movie Yorisou
- Arigatou was used as theme song for Chiba TV program "Music Launcher"
