= Mirai e Susume! =

- Regular Edition's cover

Single by Momoiro Clover

from the album Iriguchi no Nai Deguchi
- B-side: "Kibun wa Super Girl!"; "Momoiro Punch" (Tofubeats Remix) (Limited Edition)
- Released: November 11, 2009 (Japan)
- Genre: J-pop
- Label: Happy Music Records

Momoiro Clover singles chronology
| "Momoiro Punch" (2009) | "Mirai e Susume!" (2009) | "Ikuze! Kaitō Shōjo" (2010) |

Music videos
- Mirai e Susume! on YouTube
- "Mirai e Susume!" release documentary on YouTube

"Mirai e Susume!" (未来へススメ!) is the 2nd indie single by the Japanese female idol group Momoiro Clover, released in Japan on November 11, 2009.

== Track listing ==
=== Limited Editions A, B ===
CD
| No. | Title | Length |
|---|---|---|
| 1. | "Mirai e Susume!" (未来へススメ!) | 4:09 |
| 2. | "Kibun wa Super Girl!" (気分はSuper Girl!) | 4:49 |
| 3. | "Mirai e Susume!" (inst) |

Limited Edition A

Limited Edition A DVD
| No. | Title | Length |
|---|---|---|
| 1. | "Mirai e Susume!" (Video Cip) |

Limited Edition B

- Limited Edition B came with a photobook

=== Regular Edition ===
CD
| No. | Title | Length |
|---|---|---|
| 1. | "Mirai e Susume!" (未来へススメ!) |
| 2. | "Kibun wa Super Girl!" (気分はSuper Girl!) |
| 3. | "Momoiro Punch" (tofubeats Remix) | 5:36 |

== Chart performance ==
| Chart (2009) | Peak position |
|---|---|
| Oricon Daily Singles Chart | 6 |
| Oricon Weekly Singles Chart | 11 |
| Billboard Japan Hot Singles Sales | 24 |
| Billboard Japan Top Independent Singles and Albums | 4 |
