= Iriguchi no Nai Deguchi =

- Cover for Regular Edition

Compilation album by Momoiro Clover
- Released: June 5, 2013 (Japan)
- Genre: J-pop, pop
- Label: SDR (Stardust Records)

Momoiro Clover chronology
5th Dimension (2013)	Iriguchi no Nai Deguchi (2013)	Amaranthus (2016)

Singles from Iriguchi no Nai Deguchi
- 1. "Momoiro Punch" Released: August 5, 2009; 2. "Mirai e Susume!" Released: November 11, 2009

Iriguchi no Nai Deguchi (入口のない出口, "Exit with No Entrance") is an album compiling all the indie recordings by the Japanese girl group Momoiro Clover. The album was released on June 5, 2013 on SDR (Stardust Records).

== Track listing ==
CD
No.	Title	Notes	Length
1.	"Ano Sora e Mukatte" (あの空へ向かって)
2.	"Milky Way" (MILKY WAY)	Coupling track of the 1st single "Momoiro Punch".
3.	"Rough Style" (ラフスタイル Rafu Sutairu)	Coupling track of the 1st single "Momoiro Punch".
4.	"Momoiro Punch" (ももいろパンチ)
5.	"Daisuki!!" (だいすき!!)	First time on CD. Cover of a song by Power Age.
6.	"Dream Wave"	Cover of a song by Rin Asuka.
7.	"Hello...Goodbye" (Hello･･･goodbye)	First time on CD. Cover of a song from TV variety show Harajuku Launchers. Originally performed by Ramjet Pulley.
8.	"Kibun wa Super Girl" (気分はSuper Girl)	Coupling track of the 2nd single "Mirai e Susume!".
9.	"Saikyō Pare Parade" (最強パレパレード Saikyō Pareparēdo)	Cover of a song by Aya Hirano, Yūko Gotō, Minori Chihara.
10.	"Mirai e Susume!" (未来へススメ!)
11.	"Tsuyoku Tsuyoku" (ツヨクツヨク)	Cover of a song by Mihimaru GT.
12.	"Words of the Mind -Brandnew Journey-" (words of the mind -brandnew journey-)	Cover of a song by Move
13.	"Believe"	Cover of "Believe" by Nami Tamaki
14.	"Hashire!" (走れ!)	Coupling song of the 1st major single "Ikuze! Kaitō Shōjo".
15.	"Kimi Yuki" (きみゆき)
16.	"Rough Style for Momoiro Clover Z" (ラフスタイル for ももいろクローバーZ)	New arrangement. New recording.
17.	"Ano Sora e Mukatte" (あの空へ向かって（Z Ver.）)	Bonus track.

== Charts ==
Chart (2013)	Peak position
Oricon Daily Albums Chart	1
Oricon Weekly Albums Chart	2
