= Momoiro Punch =

- Regular Edition's cover

Single by Momoiro Clover

from the album Iriguchi no Nai Deguchi
- B-side: "Milky Way"; "Rough Style"
- Released: August 5, 2009
- Genre: J-pop
- Label: Happy Music Records

Momoiro Clover singles chronology
"Momoiro Punch" (2009)	"Mirai e Susume!" (2009)

Music videos
- Momoiro Punch on YouTube
- Celebration of 11th place on Oricon on YouTube

"Momoiro Punch" (ももいろパンチ, Momoiro Panchi; lit. "Pink Punch") is the debut indie-label single by the Japanese girl group Momoiro Clover, released in Japan on August 5, 2009.

== Reception ==
The single debuted at the 23rd position in the weekly Oricon singles chart.

== Track listing ==
CD
No.	Title	Length
1.	"Momoiro Punch" (ももいろパンチ Momoiro Panchi)	4:26
2.	"Milky Way" (MILKY WAY)	4:01
3.	"Rough Style" (ラフスタイル Rafu Sutairu)	4:18
4.	"Momoiro Punch" (Instrumental)

Limited Edition DVD
No.	Title	Length
1.	"Momoiro Punch" (Music Video)

== Chart performance ==
Chart (2010)	Peak position
Oricon Daily Singles Chart	11
Oricon Weekly Singles Chart	23
Billboard Japan Hot Singles Sales	56
Billboard Japan Top Independent Albums and Singles	11
