= U-ka saegusa IN db III =

Studio album by U-ka Saegusa in dB
- Released: September 20, 2006
- Recorded: 2005–2006
- Genre: J-Pop
- Length: 52 minutes
- Label: Giza Studio
- Producer: CHOKAKU

U-ka Saegusa in dB chronology
U-ka saegusa IN db II (2004)	U-ka saegusa IN db III (2006)	U-ka saegusa IN db IV ~Crystal na Kisetsu ni Miserarete~ (2009)

Singles from U-ka saegusa IN db III
- 1. "Tobitatenai Watashi ni Anata ga Tsubasa wo Kureta" Released: February 16, 2005; 2. "June Bride ~Anata shika Mienai~" Released: June 15, 2005; 3. "Kimi no Ai ni Tsutsumarete Itai" Released: November 16, 2005; 4. "Ai no Wana" Released: February 15, 2006; 5. "Fall in love" Released: May 24, 2006; 6. "100 Mono Tobira" Released: June 14, 2006; 7. "Everybody Jump" Released: July 12, 2006

U-ka saegusa IN db III is the third studio album by Japanese group U-ka Saegusa in dB.

== Background ==
The album includes 7 previously released singles since Tobitatenai Watashi ni Anata ga Tsubasa wo Kureta till Everybody. The album was released on September 20, 2006 under Giza Studio label. It was released in two versions: a limited CD+DVD edition and a regular CD only edition.

== Charting performance ==
The album reached #19 rank in Oricon for first week. It charted for 5 weeks and totally sold 19,213 copies.

== Track listing ==
All lyrics are written by Yuka Saegusa

No.	Title	Music	Arrangers	Length
1.	"Tobitatenai Watashi ni Anata ga Tsubasa wo Kureta" (飛び立てない私にあなたが翼をくれた)	Aika Ohno	Akihito Tokunaga
2.	"June Bride ~Anata Shika Mienai~" (ジューンブライド 〜あなたしか見えない〜)	Akihito Tokunaga	Akihito Tokunaga
3.	"Kimi no Ai ni Tsutsumarete Itai" (君の愛に包まれて痛い)	Mikiko Mitsuno	Hirohito Furui
4.	"Ai no Wana" (愛のワナ)	Mikiko Mitsuno	Hirohito Furui
5.	"Natsu no Photograph" (夏のフォトグラフ)	Yuuka Saegusa	Hirohito Furui
6.	"Kimi no Naka ni Boku no Ibasho wo Sagashitai" (君の中に僕の居場所を探したい)	Yuuka Saegusa	Takeshi Hayama
7.	"Mou Jibun ga Jibun ni Uso wo Tsukanai You ni" (もう自分が自分に嘘をつかないように)	Yuka Saegusa	Masazumi Ozawa
8.	"Ashita ni Furu Yume yo" (明日に降る夢よ)	Hiroshi Terao	Masazumi Ozawa
9.	"100 Mono Tobira" (100もの扉, duet song with Aiuchi Rina)	Katsuo Ohno	Hirohito Furui
10.	"Sora Tobu Ano Shiroi Kumo no You ni" (空飛ぶあの白い雲のように, originally performed by Sayuri Iwata)	Aika Ohno	Takeshi Hayama
11.	"Everybody Jump"	Yuichirou Iwai	Hirohito Furui
12.	"Fall in Love"	Yuuka Saegusa	Hirohito Furui
13.	"Ai Kotoba" (愛言葉)	Yuuka Saegusa	Hirohito Furui
14.	"Honey"	Yuuka Saegusa	Takeshi Hayama

== Usage in media ==
- The song June Bride ~Anata Shika Mienai~ was used as outro theme for anime Detective Conan
- The song Tobitatenai Watashi ni Anata ga Tsubasa wo Kureta was used as ending theme for program Ultraman Nexus aired at Tokyo Broadcasting System Television
- The song Kimi no Ai ni Tsutsumarete Itai and Ai no Wana was used as intro theme for anime Kakutō Bishin Ūron
- The song 100 Mono Tobira was used as intro theme for anime Detective Conan
- The song Everybody Jump and was used as opening theme for anime Kakutō Bishin Ūron Rebirth
- The song Fall in Love was used as ending theme for anime Kakutō Bishin Ūron Rebirth
