= U-ka saegusa IN db 1st ~Kimi to Yakusoku Shita Yasashii Ano Basho made~ =

Studio album by U-ka Saegusa in dB
- Released: November 19, 2003
- Recorded: 2002–2003
- Genre: J-Pop
- Length: 54:46
- Label: Giza Studio
- Producer: CHOKAKU

U-ka Saegusa in dB chronology
Secret & Lies (2003)	U-ka saegusa IN db 1st ~Kimi to Yakusoku Shita Yasashii Ano Basho made~ (2003)	U-ka saegusa IN db II (2004)

Singles from U-ka saegusa IN db 1st ~Kimi to Yakusoku Shita Yasashii Ano Basho made~
- 1. "It's for you" Released: August 28, 2002; 2. "CHU☆TRUE LOVE" Released: Jun 18 2003; 3. "I can't see, I can't feel" Released: August 20, 2003; 4. "Kimi to Yakusoku Shita Yasashii Ano Basho made" Released: October 29, 2003

U-ka saegusa IN db 1st ~Kimi to Yakusoku Shita Yasashii Ano Basho made~ is the first studio album by Japanese pop-rock band U-ka Saegusa in dB. The album was released on November 19, 2003, under Giza Studio label.

== Background ==
The album includes 4 previously released singles since It's for you till Kimi to Yakusoku Shita Yasashii Ano Basho made. The singles Whenever I think of you and Tears go by weren't released in this album. Ex.member of Japanese electro unit Pamelah, Masazumi Ozawa becomes involved with the album production as arranger. Ex.members of Japanese rock band Rumania Montevideo, Makoto Miyoshi and Kazunobu Mashima appeared in the credits of staff as composers.

== Charting performance ==
The album reached #19 rank in Oricon for first week. It charted for 6 weeks and sold 25,747 copies.

== Track listing ==
All lyrics are written by Yuka Saegusa

No.	Title	Music	Arrangers	Length
1.	"Shocking Blue"	Aika Ohno	Masazumi Ozawa (ex.Pamelah)
2.	"Kimi to Yakusoku Shita Yasashii Ano Basho made" (君と約束した優しいあの場所まで)	Ozawa	Ozawa
3.	"Chu☆True Love"	Ohno	Akihito Tokunaga
4.	"Hirari Yumehitoyo" (ひらり 夢一夜)	Daria Kawashima	Daisuke Ikeda
5.	"I'm in love"	Ohno	Ozawa
6.	"Passionate Wave"	Tokunaga	Ozawa
7.	"Because I love you, good-bye street"	Tokunaga	Yoshinobu Ohga (ex.nothin' but love)
8.	"Igokochi no ii Honey" (居心地のいいハニー)	Ohno	Ozawa
9.	"It's for you 〜Acoustic version〜"	Kawashima	Ikeda
10.	"Destiny Wind Blows 〜Album version〜"	Makoto Miyoshi (ex.Rumania Montevideo)	Ozawa
11.	"Kimi no Hitomi no Naka wa Mystery" (君の瞳の中はミステリー)	Tokunaga	Tokunaga
12.	"I can't see, I can't feel"	Ozawa	Ozawa
13.	"I wish"	Kazunobu Mashima (ex.Ramjet Pulley)	Satoru Kobayashi

== Usage in media ==
- The song Kimi to Yakusoku Shita Yasashii Ano Basho made was used as opening theme for Anime television series Detective Conan
- The song CHU☆TRUE LOVE was used as theme songs for music program AX MUSIC-TV aired at Nippon TV
- The song Shocking Blue was used as ending theme for program Pro no Domyaku aired at Yomiuri TV
- The song I can't see, I can't feel was used as theme song for program AX MUSIC-TV aired at Nippon TV
