= It's for You (U-ka Saegusa in dB song) =

2002 single by U-ka Saegusa in dB

Single by U-ka Saegusa in dB

from the album Secret & Lies
- B-side: "Magic Summer"
- Released: August 28, 2002
- Genre: J-pop; anime song
- Length: 4:45
- Label: Giza Studio
- Songwriter(s): U-ka Saegusa; Daria Kawashima
- Producer(s): Kannonji

U-ka Saegusa in dB singles chronology
"Whenever I Think of You" (2002)	"It's for You" (2002)	"Tears Go by" (2002)

"It's for You" is a song by Japanese pop rock band U-ka Saegusa in dB. It was released on 28 August 2002 through Giza Studio, as the second single from their first extended play Secret & Lies. The single reached number twenty in Japan and has sold over 14,610 copies nationwide. The song served as the theme songs to the Japanese anime television series, Cheeky Angel.

== Track listing ==
CD single
No.	Title	Writer(s)	Arranger(s)	Length
1.	"It's for You"	U-ka Saegusa; Daria Kawashima	Daisuke Ikeda	4:45
2.	"Magic Summer"	Saegusa; Akihito Tokunaga	Ikeda	3:30
3.	"It's for You" (Acoustic version featuring Yoshinobu Ohga from Nothin' but love)	Saegusa; Kawashima	Ikeda	4:45
4.	"It's for You" (Instrumental)	Saegusa; Kawashima	Ikeda	4:42

== Charts ==
Chart (2002)	Peak position
Japan (Oricon)	20

== Certification and sales ==
Region	Certification	Certified units/sales
Japan (RIAJ)	None	14,610

== Release history ==
Region	Date	Format	Catalogue Num.	Label	Ref.
Japan	28 August 2002	CD	GZCA-2049	Giza Studio	
