= Shiori Niiyama =

Japanese singer

Shiori Niiyama 新山 詩織
- Born: February 10, 1996 (age 30); Saitama, Japan
- Genres: J-pop
- Occupations: singer; songwriter
- Years active: 2012–2018, 2021-
- Label: B Zone
- Website: niiyama-shiori.com

YouTube information
- Channel: NiiyamaShiori
- Years active: 2012–present
- Subscribers: 25.5 thousand
- Views: 7.63 million
- Last updated: August 4, 2026

Shiori Niiyama (新山 詩織, Niiyama Shiori; born February 10, 1996) is a Japanese singer and songwriter, who made major debut with single Yureru Yureru under B Zone in 2013. In, 2018, she announced hiatus which lasted 3 years and in 2021 resumed her music activities.

== Biography ==
Under the influence of her father, Shiori grew up listening to various music genres such as rock, punk and blues. In elementary school she learned to play on piano, in junior high school she formed band and played on electronic guitar. After finishing high school, she started fully took guitar and vocal lessons. She performed street lives in Shinjuku and Ohmiya.

In June 2012, Shiori applied in audition Jibun wo Kaetakute and won Grand Prix Treasure Hunt2012 with her original song Dakarasa and cover of Sheena Ringo cover Marunouchi Sadistic. Dakarasa was released as a single in limited copies on December 12.

On April 17, 2013, she made major debut with single Yureru Yureru.

On March 26, 2014, she released her first studio album Shiori. On April 20–26 she held her first solo tour Shiorigoto. In July debut album Shiori was nominated on the CD Shop Awards "2015". In December her fifth single Zettai was released in three formats, one includes short live footage from first solo tour Shiorigoto.

In April 2016 she appeared as a supporting actress on Japanese television series Love song. With collaboration of a Japanese actor and musician Masaharu Fukuyama, she released her first digital single Koi no Naka which was later used in television series as an insert theme song. In November she released her third and final studio album Finder no Mukou.

Her music and live activities has started decrease after 2017. In March she made appearance on commercial of Nippon Telegraph and Telephone and performed song Rakugakichou. In September she released her final single Sayonara Watashi no Koigokoro which was produced and composed by Japanese singer-songwriter Chara, the single includes b-side track commercial song previously recorded on March. In November recording footage of Kan cover Ai wa Katsu was released on the official YouTube channel of Nippon Foundation. The cover song was never released in any music format.

In January 2018 Shiori released her only compilation album Shiori Goto: Best which includes all released 9 singles and as part of first-press bonus all music videoclips which were recorded for single promotions. In February 2018 Shiori held her final solo tour which was part of her fifth debut anniversary celebration. Video footages from acoustic live Shiori dake: Hitori Uta and final tour Shiori Goto: Best were released in DVD format within that year.

On October 20 through official website staff has announced hiatus of her music activities since December 2018.

On 10 February 2020, she temporarily returned as a ciii and uploaded on her temporary YouTube Channel song Ano Bus ni Noranakucha and shared the name of Instagram account, which has been active from autumn 2019 until January 2021.

In April 2021, Shiori officially announced resume of her music activities through official website. At the same time was announced new promotional song for the online drama Love Delusion.

== Discography ==
During her 6-year career Shiori released 9 singles, 2 DVD, 3 studio and 1 compilation albums.

=== Singles ===
No.	Information	Release	Format	Ranking	Album
0th	Dakara sa -acoustic version- (だからさ)	December 12, 2012	CD	-	Shiori Goto: Best
1st	Yureru Yureru (ゆれるユレル)	April 17, 2013	CD	57	Shiori
2nd	Don't Cry	July 10, 2013	CD	38	Shiori
3rd	Hitori Goto (ひとりごと)	November 13, 2013	CD	39	Shiori
4th	Ima, Koko ni Iru (今 ここにいる)	February 12, 2014	CD	45	Shiori
5th	Zettai (絶対)	December 3, 2014	CD+DVD (MV); CD+DVD (Live); CD	53	Hello Goodbye
6th	Arigatou (ありがとう)	March 18, 2015	CD+DVD (MV); CD+DVD (Live); CD	40	Hello Goodbye
7th	Tonari no Yukue (隣の行方)	February 10, 2016	CD+DVD (MV); CD+DVD (Live); CD	21	Finder no Mukou
8th	Atashi wa, Atashi no Mama de (あたしはあたしのままで)	June 29, 2016	CD+DVD (MV); CD	16	Finder no Mukou
9th	Sayonara Watashi no Koigokoro (さよなら私の恋心)	September 6, 2017	CD+DVD (MV); CD+DVD (Live); CD	39	Shiori Goto: Best

==== Collaboration singles ====
Title	Single details	Reference
Haru Kumori (feat. Ran)	Released: 27 April 2024; Label: B Zone; Formats: digital download, streaming	

=== Studio albums ===
No.	Information	Release	Format	Ranking
1st	Shiori (しおり)	March 26, 2014	CD + Novel Booklet; CD+DVD; CD	39
2nd	Hello Goodbye (ハローグッバイ)	June 17, 2015	CD+DVD (MV); CD	32
3rd	Finder no Mukou (ファインダーの向こう)	November 30, 2016	CD+DVD (MV); CD+DVD (Live); CD+Bonus CD	26
4rd	Nanimono: Juunen Juuiro (何者 ～十年十色～)	July 5, 2013	CD; CD+DVD; CD+Booklet	-

=== EP ===
No.	Information	Release	Format	Ranking
1st	I'm Here	April 6, 2022	CD	-

=== Compilation albums ===
No.	Information	Release	Format	Ranking
1st	Shiori Goto: Best (しおりごと)	January 31, 2018	CD; CD+DVD	38

=== Other appearances ===
List of non-studio album or guest appearances that feature Shiori Niiyama
Title	Year	Artist	Album/Single
"Ano Hi"	2024	Ran	Ano Hi

== Videography ==
=== DVD ===
No.	Information	Release	Format	Ranking
1st	Shiori Niiyama Premium Hikigatari Live "Shiori Dake: Hitori Uta" (新山詩織 PREMIUM 弾き語りライブ「しおりだけ～ひとり唄～」)	June 27, 2018	DVD	46
2nd	Shiori Niiyama Live Tour 2018: Shiori Goto Best" (新山詩織 ライブツアー2018「しおりごと-BEST-」)	October 17, 2018	DVD	38

== Interview ==
From Barks:

- Yureru Yureru
- Don't Cry
- Hitorigoto

•Ima wa Koko ni Iru

- Shiori
- Zettai
- Hello Goodbye

From Natalie Inc:

- Yureru Yureru
- Don't Cry
- Hitorigoto
- Ima Koko ni Iru
- Shiori
- Zettai
- Hello Goodbye

From Billboard Japan

- Yureru Yureru
- Hitorigoto
- Ima Koko ni Iru
- Shiori
- Zettai
- Hello-Goodbye

From Modelpress:

- Atashi wa Atashi no Mama de (part 1), (part 2)

From Teena

- Atashi wa Atashi no Mama de

From Diskgarage

- Shiorigoto: Best
