= U-ka saegusa IN db IV ~Crystal na Kisetsu ni Miserarete~ =

Studio album by U-ka Saegusa in dB
- Released: November 25, 2009
- Recorded: 2008–2009
- Genre: J-pop
- Length: 49 minutes
- Label: Giza Studio
- Producer: CHOKAKU

U-ka Saegusa in dB chronology
U-ka saegusa IN db III (2006)	U-ka saegusa IN db IV ~Crystal na Kisetsu ni Miserarete~ (2009)

Singles from U-ka saegusa IN db IV ~Crystal na Kisetsu ni Miserarete~
- 1. "Yukidoke no Ano Kawa no Nagare no You ni" Released: February 16, 2008; 2. "Daremo ga Kitto Dareka no Santa Claus" Released: December 15, 2008; 3. "Mou Kimi wo Hitori ni Sasenai" Released: November 16, 2009; 4. "Itsumo Sugao no Watashi de Itai" Released: February 15, 2009; 5. "Natsu no Owari ni Anata he no Tegami Kakitometeimasu" Released: May 24, 2009

U-ka saegusa IN db IV ~Crystal na Kisetsu ni Miserarete~ is the fourth and last studio album by Japanese group U-ka Saegusa in dB.

== Background ==
The album includes 5 previously released singles since Yukidoke no Ano Kawa no Nagare no You ni till Natsu no Owari ni Anata he no Tegami Kakitometeimasu. The album was released on November 25, 2009 under Giza Studio label. It was released in two versions: a limited CD+DVD edition and a regular CD only edition.

== Chart performance ==
The album reached #33 rank in Oricon for first week. It charted for 2 weeks and totally sold 5,999 copies.

== Track listing ==
All lyrics are written by Yuka Saegusa

No.	Title	Music	Arrangers	Length
1.	"Crystal na Kisetsu ni Miserarete" (クリスタルな季節に魅せられて)	Yuka Saegusa	Masazumi Ozawa
2.	"Mou Kimi wo Hitori ni Sasenai" (もう君をひとりにさせない)	Aika Ohno	Masazumi Ozawa
3.	"Yukidoke no Ano Kawa no Nagare no You ni" (雪どけのあの川の流れのように)	Yuka Saegusa	Takeshi Hayama
4.	"Shiro no Fantasy" (白のファンタジー, originally performed by Jewelry)	Aika Ohno	Daisuke Ikeda
5.	"Kanashii Ame ga Furitsuzuite mo" (悲しい雨が降り続いても)	Masazumi Ozawa	Masazumi Ozawa
6.	"Kono Sekai ni Kimi ga Iru Dake de" (この世界に君がいるだけで)	Aika Ohno	Masazumi Ozawa
7.	"Natsu no Owari ni Anata e no Tegami Kakitometeimasu" (夏の終りにあなたへの手紙書きとめています)	Aika Ohno	Takeshi Hayama
8.	"precious memories"	Masazumi Ozawa	Takeshi Hayama
9.	"Daremo ga Kitto Dareka no Santa Claus" (誰もがきっと誰かのサンタクロース)	Aika Ohno	Takeshi Hayama
10.	"Gomen ne Ima mo mada Kimi wo Aishiteru kara" (ごめんね 今もまだ君を愛してるから)	Aika Ohno	Takeshi Hayama
11.	"Itsumo Sugao no Watashi de Itai" (いつも素顔の私でいたい)	Aika Ohno	Takeshi Hayama
12.	"Zutto Zutto Kimi no Koibito de Itai" (ずっとずっと君の恋人でいたい)	Masazumi Ozawa	Masazumi Ozawa

== Usage in media ==
- The song Mou Kimi wo Hitori ni Sasenai was used as an ending theme for anime television series Golgo 13
