= Sakura Fujiwara =

Japanese singer-songwriter and actress (born 1995)

Sakura Fujiwara 藤原 さくら
- Born: December 30, 1995 (age 30); Fukuoka, Japan
- Genre: J-pop
- Occupations: Singer-songwriter, actress
- Instruments: Vocals, guitar
- Years active: 2013–present
- Labels: Space Shower Music (2014–2015); Speedstar (2015–2023); Tiny Jungle Records (2023–present)
- Website: fujiwarasakura.com

YouTube information
- Channel: 藤原さくら
- Years active: 2023 -
- Subscribers: 232 thousand
- Views: 81.3 million
- Last updated: August 4, 2026

Sakura Fujiwara (藤原さくら, Fujiwara Sakura; born December 30, 1995) is a Japanese singer-songwriter and actress. She is managed by the agency Amuse Inc.

== Biography ==
Fujiwara was born on December 30, 1995, and grew up in Fukuoka Prefecture. Sakura's father was a bass player in a rock band in his youth. When she was 10 years old, she got a classical guitar from her father and began playing music.

Her father had a great love for music and Sakura began listening to various music genres such as rock, folk, soul and world music. Under the influence of her father, she became an enthusiastic fan of The Beatles. Sakura professes that her favorite musician is Paul McCartney. She also enjoys Yael Naim, Nora Jones, and YUI out of all female musicians.

2015

Sakura made her debut in 2015 with the mini-album à la carte. "Just one girl" was used for the drama Gakkō no Kaidan as the featured song.

2016

Her first studio album good morning was released in 2016. She starred in the romantic television drama, Love Song, alongside Masaharu Fukuyama. It aired from April 11 to June 13, 2016, on Fuji TV. She released her first single Soup on June 8, 2016.

2017

On March 29, 2017, Sakura released her second single Someday / Haru no Uta. "Haru no uta" was used for the theme song of live-action adaptation of March Comes in like a Lion. Her second studio album PLAY was released on May 10, 2017. The song "1995", which is included in the album good morning, was used for the film Sekai wa Kyou kara Kimi no Mono (English title_ Her Sketchbook). On September 27, 2017, Sakura released the collaboration song "Koi no Hajimari" with Leo Ieiri and Sakurako Ohara. On October 25, 2017, Sakura collaborated with manga artist Eisaku Kubonouchi and composed the song "Just the way we are" for NHK Paralympic-Themed Anime short movie.

2018

On February 7, 2018, Sakura released the song "The Moon". This song was used as the theme song of the animation movie Code Geass: Lelouch of the Rebellion II Handou. On May 23, 2018, Sakura made a cover of Sheena Ringo's song "Akane sasu kiro terasaredo .." in Ringo's 20th anniversary tribute album Adam to Eve no Ringo (Adam and Eve's Apple). On June 13, 2018, Sakura released her second mini-album green. The song "NEW DAY" was used for the ED of the anime television series Waka Okami wa Shōgakusei! (English title_ OKKO'S INN) and the song "Mata Ashita (English title_ See you Tomorrow)" was used for the theme song of the animation movie Waka Okami wa Shōgakusei!. On September 19, 2018, Sakura released her third mini-album red. The EP green and red is a two-part work.

2020

On October 21, her third studio album Supermarket was released.

2021

On August 25, her first live album Supermarket Live 2021 at Nakano Sunplaza was released.

2023

On May 17, her fourth studio album Airport was released.

2024

On April 3, her fifth studio album wood mood was released. On June 5, Sakura announced a hiatus from her musical activities due to functional dysphonia, a type of voice disorder not caused by physical or neurological problems. She remained inactive for several months afterward.

2025

She resumed her musical activities in the first half of 2025 but has not yet fully recovered.

== Discography ==
As of 2023, Fujiwara released 6 original albums, 3 EPs, 1 live album, 3 physical singles, 15 digital singles and 2 home-video releases.

=== Studio albums ===
List of albums, with selected chart positions
| Title | Album details | Peak positions |
| Title | Album details | JPN Oricon |
|---|---|---|
| Good Morning | Released: February 17, 2016; Label: JVCKenwood Victor Entertainment; Formats: CD, digital download, streaming | 44 |
| Play | Released: May 10, 2017; Label: JVCKenwood Victor Entertainment; Formats: CD, CD+DVD, digital download, streaming | 5 |
| Supermarket | Released: October 21, 2020; Label: JVCKenwood Victor Entertainment; Formats: CD, LP, digital download, streaming | 24 |
| Airport | Released: May 17, 2023; Label: JVCKenwood Victor Entertainment; Formats: CD, CD+BD, LP, digital download, streaming | 16 |
| Wood Mood | Released: April 3, 2024; Label: Tiny Jungle; Formats: CD, digital download, streaming | 14 |
| Uku | Released: February 18, 2026; Label: Tiny Jungle; Formats: CD, digital download, streaming | 23 |

=== EPs ===
List of EPs, with selected chart positions
| Title | EP details | Peak positions |
| Title | EP details | JPN Oricon |
|---|---|---|
| à la carte | Released: March 18, 2015; Label: JVCKenwood Victor Entertainment; Formats: CD, digital download, streaming | 67 |
| Green | Released: June 13, 2018; Label: JVCKenwood Victor Entertainment; Formats: CD, digital download, streaming | 13 |
| Red | Released: September 19, 2018; Label: JVCKenwood Victor Entertainment; Formats: CD, CD+bandana digital download, streaming | 20 |
| Mabataki | Released: June 1, 2022; Label: JVCKenwood Victor Entertainment; Formats: CD, CD+book, digital download, streaming | 33 |

=== Live albums ===
List of live albums, with selected chart positions
| Title | Album details |
|---|---|
| Supermarket Live 2021 at Nakano Sunplaza | Released: August 25, 2021; Label: JVCKenwood Victor Entertainment; Formats: digital download, streaming |

=== Singles ===
List of singles, with selected chart positions
| Year | Single | Peak chart positions | Formats |
| Year | Single | JPN Physical | Formats |
|---|---|---|---|
| 2016 | "Soup" | 120 | CD, CD+DVD, digital download, streaming |
| 2017 | "Someday" / "Haru no Uta" | 105 | CD, CD+DVD, digital download, streaming |
| 2020 | "Twilight/Ami" | — | LP |
"—" denotes items which did not chart.

=== Digital single ===
| Year | Single | Reference |
|---|---|---|
| 2016 | "Just a Girl" | |
| 2016 | "Kawaii" | |
| 2018 | "Soup" | |
| 2018 | "New Day" | |
| 2020 | "Ami" | |
| 2020 | "Twilight" | |
| 2020 | "Waver" | |
| 2020 | "Monster" | |
| 2021 | "Kirakira" | |
| 2021 | "Kimi ha Tennenshoku" | |
| 2021 | "Mother" | |
| 2022 | "Watashi no Life" | |
| 2022 | "Latamnica" | |
| 2023 | "Itsuka Mita Eiga Mitaani" | |
| 2023 | "Daybreak" | |
| 2024 | "Hatsukoi no Nioi (Scent of First Love)" | |
| 2025 | "Angel" | |
| 2025 | "scent of the time" | |
| 2025 | "Two of Me" (from Star Wars: Visions - Black) | |

=== Home video ===
List of home-video releases, with selected chart positions
| Title | Album details | Peak positions |
| Title | Album details | JPN Oricon |
|---|---|---|
| Yagai Ongakukai 2018' Live at Hibiya Yagai Daiongakudō 20180715 | Released: January 16, 2019; Label: JVCKenwood Victor Entertainment; Formats: DVD, BD | 18, 22 |
| SUPERMARKET Live 2021 at Nakano Sunplaza | Released: August 25, 2021; Label: JVCKenwood Victor Entertainment; Formats: DVD, BD | -, - |
"—" denotes items which did not chart.

=== Other appearances ===
List of non-studio album or guest appearances that feature Sakura Fujiwara
| Title | Year | Artist | Album/Single |
|---|---|---|---|
| "Boy" | 2014 | THE GOGGLES | NANAIROPLAN_yellow |
| "Hello Radio" | 2016 | Pool Side | Hello Radio |
| "Bite My Nails feat. Sakura Fujiwara" | 2016 | Tomita Lab. | Superfine |
| "Koi no Hajimari" | 2017 | with Leo Ieiri and Sakurako Ohara | Koi no Hajimari |
| "Good Luck Baby", "Mondainai" | 2017 | Kazuyoshi Saito | Toys Blood Music |
| "Akanesasu Kiro terasaredo" | 2018 | Sheena Ringo | Adam to Eve no Ringo |
| "All I have to do (Honrai Nara Do)" | 2018 | THE GOGGLES | Magical Mystery Covers |
| "LA feat. Sakura Fujiwara" | 2019 | Curly Giraffe | A taste of dream |
| "Sweet Dreams feat.Sakura Fujiwara" | 2019 | Sanabagun | Ballads |
| "Bohemian Rhapsody" | 2020 | Musica Piccolino | Belcanto Gō no SONGBOOK I |
| "Shura nogotoku", "Kono Uta ga Kikoetara" | 2021 | Tsukasa Okazaki | Okazaki Tsukasa WORKS 3: Best of Gekidan Shinkansen |
| "Map for Love" | 2021 | Tomita Lab. | 7+ |
| "Driveway feat. Sakura Fujiwara" | 2021 | Michael Kaneko | The Neighborhood |
| "Smile! with Sakura Fujiwara" | 2021 | Rei | QUILT |
| "Bitter Rain feat. Sakura Fujiwara" | 2022 | Yuji Ohno & Lupintic Six | Lupin the Third Part 6: Woman |
| "Moondancer" | 2022 | Maco Marets | When you swing the virtual ax |
| "The Moon × Hoshi Nante Iwazu" | 2022 | with NakamuraEmi | The Moon × Hoshi Nante Iwazu |
| "Soushun Monogatari" | 2022 | Tomoyo Harada | ToMoYo covers: Harada Tomoya Official Cover Album |
| "Pineapple (I'm Always on Your Side) feat. Sakura Fujiwara" | 2023 | Kazuyoshi Saito | Pineapple |

== Songwriting credits ==
List of songs written or co-written for other artists, showing year released and album name
| Title | Year | Artist(s) | Album |
|---|---|---|---|
| "Kimi Ni" | 2017 | Mone Kamishiraishi | And... |
| "And Hi no Kotoba" | 2022 | Nao Tōyama | And Hi no Kotoba/Growing |

== Filmography ==
=== TV dramas ===
- Blossom (2026), Sumiko

=== Film ===
- Twilight Cinema Blues (2023), Erika Adachi
- The Voices at War (2024), Tsuya Akanuma
- Sato and Sato (2025), Asa Shinoda
- Coffee After All (2026)
