= Screaming Lessons =

Manga and live-action film

- First tankōbon volume cover

絶叫学級 (Zekkyō Gakkyū)
- Genre: Horror
- Manga
- Written by: Emi Ishikawa
- Published by: Shueisha
- English publisher: Shueisha (digital)
- Imprint: Ribon Mascot Comics
- Magazine: Ribon
- Original run: September 3, 2008 – February 3, 2015
- Volumes: 20
- Live-action film
- Released: June 14, 2013
- Runtime: 77 minutes
- Manga

Zekkyō Gakkyū: Tensei
- Written by: Emi Ishikawa
- Published by: Shueisha
- English publisher: Shueisha (digital)
- Imprint: Ribon Mascot Comics
- Magazine: Ribon
- Original run: June 3, 2015 – present
- Volumes: 23

Screaming Lessons (Japanese: 絶叫学級; Zekkyō Gakkyū) is a Japanese manga series written and illustrated by Emi Ishikawa, and was serialized in Shueisha's Ribon magazine from September 2008 to February 2015. The format was a collection of horror-themed short stories that were presented by a ghost girl named Yomi. It is licensed in France by Tonkam. A live-action film adaptation was released in Japanese theaters in June 2013. A sequel manga titled Zekkyō Gakkyū: Tensei (絶叫学級 転生; lit. "Screaming Lessons: Reincarnation") began serialization in the same magazine in June 2015.

== Characters ==
Yomi
Portrayed by: Mizuki Yamamoto
Kana Araki
Portrayed by: Haruna Kawaguchi
Rio Takamizawa
Portrayed by: Alice Hirose
Erika Katori
Portrayed by: Mayu Matsuoka
Makoto Hosaka
Portrayed by: Haru
Akira Gotō
Portrayed by: Louis Kurihara

== Media ==
=== Manga ===
Written and illustrated by Emi Ishikawa, Screaming Lessons was serialized in Shueisha's Ribon magazine from September 3, 2008, to February 3, 2015. The series' chapters were collected into twenty tankōbon volumes released from January 15, 2009, to March 13, 2015. In 2026, the series became licensed digitally in English on Shueisha's Manga Million platform.

A sequel manga, titled Zekkyō Gakkyū: Tensei (絶叫学級 転生; lit. "Screaming Lessons: Reincarnation"), began serialization in the same magazine on June 3, 2015.

==== Volumes ====
| No. | Release date | ISBN |
|---|---|---|
| 1 | January 15, 2009 | 978-4-08-856864-5 |
| 2 | May 15, 2009 | 978-4-08-856887-4 |
| 3 | October 15, 2009 | 978-4-08-867016-4 |
| 4 | March 15, 2010 | 978-4-08-867043-0 |
| 5 | July 15, 2010 | 978-4-08-867064-5 |
| 6 | November 15, 2010 | 978-4-08-867084-3 |
| 7 | February 15, 2011 | 978-4-08-867098-0 |
| 8 | June 15, 2011 | 978-4-08-867124-6 |
| 9 | October 14, 2011 | 978-4-08-867146-8 |
| 10 | February 15, 2012 | 978-4-08-867175-8 |
| 11 | May 15, 2012 | 978-4-08-867200-7 |
| 12 | October 15, 2012 | 978-4-08-867226-7 |
| 13 | February 15, 2013 | 978-4-08-867250-2 |
| 14 | June 14, 2013 | 978-4-08-867274-8 |
| 15 | July 12, 2013 | 978-4-08-867276-2 |
| 16 | November 15, 2013 | 978-4-08-867296-0 |
| 17 | February 14, 2014 | 978-4-08-867313-4 |
| 18 | June 13, 2014 | 978-4-08-867325-7 |
| 19 | October 15, 2014 | 978-4-08-867341-7 |
| 20 | March 13, 2015 | 978-4-08-867358-5 |

==== Zekkyō Gakkyū: Tensei ====
| No. | Release date | ISBN |
|---|---|---|
| 1 | October 23, 2015 | 978-4-08-867392-9 |
| 2 | March 25, 2016 | 978-4-08-867409-4 |
| 3 | August 25, 2016 | 978-4-08-867427-8 |
| 4 | January 25, 2017 | 978-4-08-867442-1 |
| 5 | June 23, 2017 | 978-4-08-867464-3 |
| 6 | October 25, 2017 | 978-4-08-867477-3 |
| 7 | April 25, 2018 | 978-4-08-867496-4 |
| 8 | September 25, 2018 | 978-4-08-867515-2 |
| 9 | February 25, 2019 | 978-4-08-867537-4 |
| 10 | July 25, 2019 | 978-4-08-867555-8 |
| 11 | February 25, 2020 | 978-4-08-867577-0 |
| 12 | August 25, 2020 | 978-4-08-867591-6 |
| 13 | December 24, 2020 | 978-4-08-867608-1 |
| 14 | February 25, 2021 | 978-4-08-867617-3 |
| 15 | June 24, 2021 | 978-4-08-867626-5 |
| 16 | November 25, 2021 | 978-4-08-867638-8 |
| 17 | March 25, 2022 | 978-4-08-867657-9 |
| 18 | July 25, 2022 | 978-4-08-867674-6 |
| 19 | November 25, 2022 | 978-4-08-867689-0 |
| 20 | March 24, 2023 | 978-4-08-867709-5 |
| 21 | October 25, 2023 | 978-4-08-867736-1 |
| 22 | April 24, 2024 | 978-4-08-867752-1 |
| 23 | September 25, 2024 | 978-4-08-867770-5 |
| 24 | March 25, 2025 | 978-4-08-867794-1 |

=== Live-action film ===
A live-action film adaptation was released on June 14, 2013.

=== Other ===
In 2010, the series was given a "vomic" (voiceover comic) that starred Tomomi Kasai, Moeno Nitō, Haruka Ishida, and Reina Fujie, who are members of the Japanese idol group AKB48.

== Reception ==
It won the award for Best Children's Manga at the 59th Shogakukan Manga Awards.
