= Ramjet Pulley =

Japanese musical group

- Origin: Japan
- Genres: J-pop, jazz, lounge, new-age
- Years active: 2000-2003
- Label: Giza Studio
- Spinoff of: Rumania Montevideo
- Past members: Kazunobu Mashima; Akiko Matsuda; Satomi Makoshi
- Website: beinggiza.com/ci/artist/ramjet_pulley/

Ramjet Pulley (Japanese: ラムジェット プーリー) was a Japanese J-pop band active from 2000 to 2003 under the Giza Studio label.

== Personnel ==
- Akiko Matsuda (松田明子) - vocalist
- Satomi Makoshi (麻越さとみ) - bassist, lyricist
- Kazunobu Mashima (間島和伸) - guitarist, composer

== History ==
=== Beginning and the formation ===
All three members originally came from the Japanese Pop-rock band Rumania Montevideo. The formation started after the release of Rumania Montevideo's fifth single Start All Over Again.

According to official website, in this side project they wanted a chance to express themselves differently than in their other band. By facing new challenges musically, they try to fulfill their love for music in ways that is intended to impress not only Rumania Montevideo fans, but a variety of different listening audiences and genres. Kazonobu songs shows a melody deployment, Satomi words tries to emphasize with the sound of the words from the daily life, and then Akiko's voice is meant to give the listener the floating feeling of a life given to everyone, inviting them to a soft psychedelic world.

=== 2000–2001 ===
In November 2000, they made major debut with the single "Hello...Goodbye". The B-side track "Destiny" was later covered by Japanese singer-songwriter Miki Matsuhashi with arrangement by Toshiya Shimizu. The cover version was used as an opening theme for Anime television series Detective Conan.

In April 2001 their second single Overjoyed was released. It was their biggest hit during whole career and best reached #90 on Oricon Weekly Charts. B-side track includes jazz remix version of debut single "Hello...Goodbye". In April they earn the most power play song in the nationwide FM by 10 stations.

In May they've finished recording for Rumania Montevideo's sixth single "Hard Rain".

In June 2001 was planned to release single "News&Bed&Trip" (with CD code GZCA-1084) however for unknown reasons the release was canceled. The song was later included in their debut album.

In July 2001 was released re-arranged version of "Destiny: 21 Another One". It differs from original version with different intro arrangement. The length is same.

In August 2001 they've released fourth single "Final Way".

In September 2001 they released their first studio album A Cup of Day. The fusion band Dimension participated in the album recording of the track "bulanco". The track "Good-bye Yesterday" was promoted in media as an ending theme for Nihon TV/Yomiuri TV television program Wake up!

The singles "Overjoyed" and "Final Way" were included in the compilation album Giza Studio Masterpiece Blend 2001.

In November 2001 they finished recording for Rumania Montevideo final single "Tender Rain".

On 15 December 2001, Akiko participated in the R&B cover album Giza Studio R&B Respect Vol.1: Six Sisters Selection, covering Free by Deniece Williams.

Later in December she performed this song in live house Hills Pan Kōjō, which was later recorded and two months later released on DVD.

=== 2002–2003 ===
In January 2002, they've finished the recording of the final studio album by Rumania Montevideo, Mo' Better Tracks. Since then they could focus more on their own band activities.

In April 2002, they released their fifth single "Change The World". Music video clip was filmed in the India and recording studio. The fifth single received remix which is included in their final studio album. It was band second and last single which enter to Oricon Weekly Charts.

In August 2002, they've released their final single "Flower". Music videoclip was formed partly on Sahara and in districts of Ohsaka. It was their first single which received media promotion an ending theme for Nihon TV television program The Sunday.

Both singles were included in the compilation album Giza Studio Masterpiece Blend 2002.

In September 2002, Akiko and Kazunobu participated in recording The★tambourines's album My Back Pages as backing vocals.

In January 2003, they released their second and final album It's a Wonderful Feeling. The album track "everything" was in media promoted as a commercial television song of Dome. Another album track "I'll fall in love again" was included in the compilation album Giza Studio Masterpiece Blend 2003.

Satomi presence became unknown after the album release.

In June 2003 Akiko appeared in live house Hill Pankoujou's session Thursday Live "Acoustic Night" as a guest singer. The live report was included in music magazine J Groove Magazine 2003, September edition.

In August 2003, Akiko released cover song "Ame no Machi wo" (雨の街を) by Yumi Arai which was produced by Tak Matsumoto, the cover song was included as the B-side of cover single "Ihoujin" by Zard.

In November 2003 the cover song was included in the rock cover album The Hit Parade produced by Tak Matsumoto.

After November 2003 Akiko's presence is unknown.

It's unknown whenever they've disbanded or are on hiatus since no statement was never published. Their official website was removed as well.

Kazunobu was active continued his music activity for various Giza artists such as Aiko Kitahara and U-ka Saegusa in dB as composer and arranger until 2007. Since then Kazunobu's presence is unknown.

On 1 December 2019, all the three members has met in the Rumania Montevideo's live, appeared as a regular guests and took memorial photo together with the members, which make reunion of the whole band for the first time in the 17 years.

Despite theirs short career, they've released 2 studio albums and 6 singles.

== Discography ==
=== Studio albums ===
Title	Album details	Peak positions
Title	Album details	JPN
A Cup of Day	Released: September 27, 2001; Label: Giza Studio; Format(s): CD, digital download	100
It's a Wonderful Feeling	Released: January 29, 2003; Label: Giza Studio; Format(s): CD, digital download	84

=== Singles ===
List of singles, with selected chart positions
Title	Year	Peak chart positions	Album
Title	Year	JPN	Album
"Hello... Good Bye"	2000	—	A Cup of Day
"Overjoyed"	2000	90	A Cup of Day
"Destiny ~21 Another One~"	2000	—	A Cup of Day
"Final Way"	2000	—	A Cup of Day
"Change the World"	2002	94	It's a Wonderful Feeling
"Flower"	2002	—	It's a Wonderful Feeling

== Magazine appearances ==
From J-Groove Magazine:

- December 2000 Vol.2
- May 2001 Vol.7
- September 2001 Vol.11
- November 2001 Vol.13
- May 2002 Vol.19
- September 2002 Vol.23
- March 2003 Vol.29

From Music Freak Magazine:

- November 2000 Vol.72: Hello-Goodbye Interview
- March 2001 Vol.76: Release information
- April 2001 Vol.77: Overjoyed interview
- July 2001 Vol.80: Release information
- August 2001 Vol.81: Final Way Interview
- September 2001 Vol.82: A cup of day self-liner notes
- April 2002 Vol.89: Change the world Interview
- July 2002 Vol.92: Release information
- August 2002 Vol.93: Flower Interview
- January 2003 Vol.98: It's a Wonderful Feeling Interview

From MARQUEE:

- Vol.35 "It's a wonderful feeling" interview
