= Love Song (TV series) =

- Genre: Romance; Drama
- Written by: Yasuko Kuramitsu
- Directed by: Hiroshi Nishitani; Shin Hirano
- Starring: Masaharu Fukuyama; Sakura Fujiwara
- Opening theme: Soup by Sakura Fujiwara
- Country of origin: Japan
- Original language: Japanese
- No. of episodes: 10

Production
- Producers: Yoshihiro Suzuki; Daisuke Kusagaya
- Running time: 54 minutes Mondays at 21:00 (JST)
- Production company: Fuji Television

Original release
- Network: Fuji Television
- Release: April 11 – June 13, 2016

Love Song (ラヴソング, Ravusongu) is a 2016 Japanese television drama, starring Masaharu Fukuyama and Sakura Fujiwara. It airs on Fuji TV on Mondays at 21:00 (JST) beginning April 11, 2016.

== Cast ==
- Masaharu Fukuyama as Kohei Kamishiro
- Sakura Fujiwara as Sakura Sano
- Masaki Suda as Soraichi Amano
- Kaho as Mami Nakamura
- Miki Mizuno as Natsuki Shishido
- Ryudo Uzaki as Yuji Sasa
- Tetsushi Tanaka as Taizo Masumura
- Kiyohiko Shibukawa as Kazuo Hoshida
- Sayaka Yamaguchi as Ryoko Watanabe
- Houka Kinoshita as Fumio Takigawa
- Shogo Sakamoto as Masashi Takahashi
- Taro Suruga as Kenta Nomura

== Episodes ==
No.	Original air date	Episode title	Romanized title	Director	Ratings (%)
1	April 11, 2016	あなたにこの声を届けたい!!たった一つの恋と歌が人生を変えていく!	Anata ni ko no koe o todoketai! ! Tatta hitotsu no koi to uta ga jinsei o kaete iku!	Hiroshi Nishitani	10.6%
2	April 18, 2016	7秒の勇気で世界が変わる	7-Byō no yūki de sekai ga kawaru	Hiroshi Nishitani	9.1%
3	April 25, 2016	あなたを想って歌います!	Anata o omotte utaimasu!	Hiroshi Nishitani	9.4%
4	May 2, 2016	物語は新展開へ!涙のキス	Monogatari wa shin tenkai e! Namida no kisu	Makoto Hirano	8.5%
5	May 9, 2016	私とあなたの終わらない歌	Watashi to anata no owaranai uta	Makoto Hirano	8.4%
6	May 16, 2016	届け…こんな歌ができたの	Todoke… kon'na uta ga dekita no	Hideyuki Aizawa	6.8%
7	May 23, 2016	溢れ出す想い…涙の告白	Afure dasu omoi… namida no kokuhaku	Makoto Hirano	6.8%
8	May 30, 2016	君とキスをした夜	Kimi to kisuwoshita yoru	Hideyuki Aizawa	7.4%
9	June 6, 2016	わたしが最後にしたい事…	Watashi ga saigo ni shitai koto...	Makoto Hirano	8.0%
10	June 13, 2016	希望という名の最後の歌	Kibō to iu na no saigo no uta	Hiroshi Nishitani	9.3%
(Viewing rates are examined by Video Research in Kantō region)

Preceded by Itsuka Kono Koi o Omoidashite Kitto Naite Shimau; January 18, 2016 – March 21, 2016	Fuji TV Monday Dramas; Mondays 21:00 – 21:54 (JST)	Succeeded by Sukinahito ga Iru Koto; July 11, 2016 - September 2016
