= Aiko Kitahara =

Japanese singer and songwriter

Aiko Kitahara 北原愛子
- Born: October 11, 1982 (age 43); Osaka, Japan
- Genres: J-pop
- Occupations: singer; songwriter
- Years active: 2002–2011
- Label: Giza Studio
- Website: Website (WebArchived)

Aiko Kitahara (北原愛子) is a former Japanese pop singer and songwriter under the Giza Studio label.

== Biography ==
Aiko's interest in music was inspired by her mother's love for bossa nova and Latin pop, which have had a big influence on her songs.

=== 2002-2003: Piece of Love ===
On 17 May 2002, she released debut single "Grand Blue". In the media it was used as an opening theme for Anime television series Tenshi na Konamaiki.

On 17 July, the Giza Studio has released cover album Giza studio MAI-K & Friends Hotrod Beach Party where she participated in cover song "Little Honda" and "Surfin' U.S.A." by The Beach Boys.

On the same day, she released first mini album Sol de verano. The promotional music videoclip covers the cover song "La Bamba" by Ritchie Valens. The album failed to reach on Oricon Weekly Charts.

On 26 July 2002, she appeared on Giza Studio live event Giza studio MAI-K & Friends Hotrod Beach Party Vol.1: 2002 Summer and performed here cover song.

On 6 November 2002, she released second single "Sun rise train". In the media it was used as a second opening theme for Anime television series Tenshi na Konamaiki.

On 18 December 2002, the debut single was included in the Giza Studio compilation album Giza Studio Masterpiece Blend 2002.

On 4 June 2003, she released third single "Himawari no you ni". In the media it was broadcast as an ending theme for NTV television program Mogumogu Gombo.

On 6 August 2003, she released fourth single "Nijiiro ni Hikaru Umi". In the media it was used as an ending theme for Anime television series Detective School Q.

On 25 September 2003, she released fifth single "Special Days". In the media it was used as an ending theme for Yomiuri TV program Pro no Domyaku.

On 19 November 2003, she released first studio album Piece of Love. The single "Special days" has received new arrangement under subtitle "album mix".

On 23 November 2003, she participated in cover song "Sono Ki ni Sasenaide" by Candies along with Saegusa Yuuka and Ai Takaoka. The cover song was recorded on cover album The Hit Parade produced by Tak Matsumoto.

On 17 December 2003, the single "Special Days" was included in the Giza Studio compilation album Giza Studio Masterpiece Blend 2003.

=== 2004-2005: Message ===
On 24 March 2004, she released sixth single Omoide ni Sukuwaretemo. In this single, two of former members Makoto Miyoshi and Kazunobu Mashima from band Rumania Montevideo has provided musical composition. In the media it was broadcast as an theme song for Yomiuri TV program Pro no Domyaku.

On 28 July 2004, she released seventh single Da Da Da. In the media it was broadcast as an ending theme for TBS television program Sunday Japon.

On 5 February 2005, she released eighth single Fuyu no Urara. In the media it was used as an ending theme for TBS television program 8Ji Desu! Minna no Monday!.

On 11 May 2005, she released second studio album Message. The single Omoide ni Sukuwaretemo has received new arrangement under subtitle album mix. The album track Message was used in the media as an ending theme for the Nihon TV program Sekai! Chou Mane Tenkyuusho

On 20 July 2005, she released ninth single Te Quiero Te Amo: Natsu no Natsu no Koi. In the media it was broadcast as an ending theme for Nihon TV program Himitsu no Hiramekin

=== 2006-2007: Sea and Shanti ===
On 1.1 January 2006, she released first music videoclip DVD Aiko Kitahara Visual Collection.

On 18 January 2006, she released tenth single Tango. It has multiple media promotion, it was used as an ending theme for Anime television series Fighting Beauty Wulong and broadcast as an opening theme for Chiba TV program MU-GEN〜Music Generations〜.

On 26 April 2006, she released eleventh single Mou Ichido Kimi ni Koishiteiru. In the media it was used as an ending theme for Anime television series Government Crime Investigation Agent Zaizen Jotaro

On 19 July 2006, she released twelfth single Moshi mo Umare Kawattara Mou Ichido Aishitekuremasuka?. It's the longest title she ever used for the single. In the media it was broadcast as an opening theme for Chiba TV program MU-GEN〜Music Generations〜. The B-side song Dreaming was also promoted in the media as an theme song for Ohsaka's Commercial facility EST (West Japan Railway Company).

On 9 August 2006, she released third studio album Sea.

On 1 November 2006, she released thirteenth single Mou Kokoro Yuretari Shinaide. It's the first song she has composed by herself. In the media it was used as a seventh ending theme for Anime television series MÄR.

On 21 March 2007, she released fourteenth single Sekaijuu Doko wo Sagashitemo. In the media it was used as an ending theme for Anime television series Kekkaishi.

On 22 April 2007, she released fifteenth single Samba Night. In the media it was broadcast as a theme song for Tokyo Broadcasting System Television program Doors 2007.

On 26 September 2007, she released final studio album Shanti.

=== 2008-2011: Compilation album and retirement ===
On 6 August 2008, after more than year she released sixteenth single Amore: Koiseyo! Otome. The single has received three media broadcasts, as an ending theme for Chiba TV program Bilive, as a theme song for NTV program Nittele Poshlet and as a theme song for NTV television program Shiodome Event Bu.

On 8.10 January 2008, she released second music videoclip DVD Aiko Kitahara Visual Collection 2.

On 5 November 2008, she released seventeenth single Sono Egao yo Eien ni. In the media it was used as an ending theme for Anime television series Golgo 13.

On 4 February 2009, she released final single Harukaze ga Mau koro ni wa. The single received two media broadcasts, as an monthly theme song for Asahousou program Music File and as an opening theme for Nihon TV television program Nittele Poshlet.

On 24 June 2009, she released compilation album Aiko Kitahara Best. The album includes all released singles, some album tracks and four unreleased songs.

In 2011, after performing her last live show in Hills Factory, Aiko announced her retirement through her blog.

Aiko didn't made any appearances on television music programs.

In 2017 the official website has been removed.

During her career, she released eighteen singles, four studio albums, one mini album and one greatest hits album.

== Discography ==
=== Singles ===
No.	Release Day	Title	Rank
1st	2002/5/29	Grand Blue	43
2nd	2002/11/6	Sun Rise Train／君の描くその未来 (Kimi no Egaku Sono Mirai)	45
3rd	2003/6/4	Himawari no You ni (向日葵のように)	96
4th	2003/8/6	Niji Iro ni Hikaru Umi (虹色にひかる海)	53
5th	2003/9/25	Special Days!!	77
6th	2004/3/24	Omoide ni Sukuwaretemo (思い出にスクワレテモ)	95
7th	2004/7/28	Da da da	79
8th	2005/2/9	Fuyu Urara (冬うらら)	97
9th	2005/7/20	Te Quiero Te Amo ~Natsu no Natsu no Koi~ (テ・ケロ テ・アモ 〜夏の夏の恋〜)	92
10th	2006/1/18	Tango	50
11th	2006/4/26	Mou Ichido Kimi ni Koishiteiru (もう一度 君に恋している)	88
12th	2006/7/19	Moshimo Umare Kawattara Mou Ichido Aishitekuremasuka? (もしも生まれ変わったら もう一度 愛してくれますか?)	55
13th	2006/11/1	Mou Kokoro Yuretari Shinaide (もう心揺れたりしないで)	71
14th	2007/3/21	Sekaijuu Doko wo Sagashitemo (世界中どこを探しても)	42
15th	2007/8/22	Samba Night	90
16th	2008/8/6	Amore ~Koiseyo! Omotetachi yo!~(Amore 〜恋せよ! 乙女達よ!!〜)	85
17th	2008/11/5	Sono Egao yo Eien ni (その笑顔よ 永遠に)	76
18th	2009/2/16	Harukaze ga Mau Koro ni wa (春風が舞う頃には)	71

=== Albums ===
==== Studio albums ====
List of albums, with selected chart positions
Title	Album details	Peak positions	Sales
Title	Album details	JPN Oricon	Sales
Piece of Love	Released: October 12, 2003; Label: Giza Studio; Format(s): CD, digital download	50	JPN: 5,174
Message	Released: May 11, 2005; Label: Giza Studio; Format(s): CD, digital download	41	JPN: 4,824
Sea	Released: August 9, 2006; Label: Giza Studio; Format(s): CD, digital download	78	JPN: 3,321
Shanti	Released: September 26, 2007; Label: Giza Studio; Format(s): CD, digital download	87	JPN: 3,409

==== Compilation albums ====
List of albums, with selected chart positions
Title	Album details	Peak positions	Sales
Title	Album details	JPN Oricon	Sales
Aiko Kitahara Best	Released: June 24, 2009; Label: Giza Studio; Format(s): CD, digital download	106	JPN: 1,454

=== Extended plays ===
List of albums, with selected chart positions
Title	Album details
Sol de Verano	Released: July 17, 2002; Label: Giza Studio; Format(s): CD, digital download

=== Video albums ===
List of albums, with selected chart positions
Title	Album details	Peak positions	Sales
Title	Album details	JPN Oricon	Sales
Aiko Kitahara Visual Collection	Released: January 1, 2006; Label: Giza Studio; Format(s): DVD	226	JPN: 2,082
Aiko Kitahara Visual Collection Vol. 2	Released: October 8, 2008; Label: Giza Studio; Format(s): DVD	46	JPN: 1,202

== Magazine appearances ==
From J-Groove Magazine:

- July 2002 Vol.21
- September 2002 Vol.23
- December 2002 Vol.26
- July 2003 Vol.33
- September 2003 Vol.35
- May 2004 Vol.43
- March 2005 Vol.53
- September 2005 Vol.59
- February 2006 Vol.64

From Music Freak Magazine:

- May 2002 Vol.90: Grand Blue Interview
- July 2002 Vol.92: Self Liner Notes Sol de verano
- October 2002 Vol.95: Information
- November 2002 Vol.96: Sun rise train Interview
