= U-ka Saegusa in dB =

Japanese band

U-ka saegusa IN db
- Also known as: db
- Origin: Osaka, Japan
- Genres: J-pop; pop rock; punk rock
- Years active: 2002–2010
- Labels: Giza Studio; B-Vision
- Past members: U-ka Saegusa; Yuichirou Iwai; Taku Oyabu; Keisuke Kurumatani
- Website: uka-saegusa.com

YouTube information
- Channel: 三枝夕夏 IN db Official Channel
- Years active: 2022
- Subscribers: 13.6 thousand
- Views: 5.013.748
- Last updated: June 24, 2026

U-ka saegusa IN db (三枝夕夏 IN db（イン デシベル）, Saegusa Yūka in Deshiberu (in Decibel)) was a Japanese pop rock band formed in Osaka in 2002. The band consists of lead vocalist U-ka Saegusa, lead guitarist Yūichirō Iwai, lead bassist Taku Ōyabu, and drummer Keisuke Kurumatani. Signed to Giza Studio, the band released four studio albums before disbanding in 2010. They're known for performing several theme songs for the Japanese anime series, Case Closed. One of the songs, "Kimi to Yakusoku Shita Yasashii Ano Basho made", became the band's best-selling single, selling approximately 34,000 copies nationwide.

== Band members ==
- Yūka "U-ka" Saegusa (三枝 夕夏, Saegusa Yūka) – lead vocals (2002–2010)
- Yūichirou Iwai (岩井 勇一郎, Iwai Yūichirō) – lead guitar, backing vocals (2003–2010)
- Taku Oyabu (大藪 拓, Ōyabu Taku) – lead bass (2003–2010)
- Keisuke Kurumatani (車谷 啓介, Kurumatani Keisuke) – drums, percussion (2003–2010)
- Akihito Tokunaga (徳永 暁人, Tokunaga Akihito) (2002)

== History ==
The band formed in 2002 around lead vocalist Yūka "U-ka" Saegusa, the band's first three singles were all featured in the anime Cheeky Angel. Its first hit single was "Kimi to Yakusoku Shita Yasashii Ano Basho Made", a theme song of the popular anime Detective Conan, which reached #8 in the Oricon charts. On October 21, 2009, Saegusa stated that the band would disband in January 2010.

== Discography ==
=== Albums ===
==== Studio albums ====
Title	Album details	Peak chart positions	Sales (JPN)
Title	Album details	JPN	Sales (JPN)
U-ka saegusa IN db 1st ~Kimi to Yakusoku Shita Yasashii Ano Basho made~	Released: 19 November 2003; Label: Giza Studio; Formats: CD, digital download	19	25,747
U-ka saegusa IN db II	Released: 17 November 2004; Label: Giza Studio; Formats: CD, digital download	23	20,814
U-ka saegusa IN db III	Released: 20 September 2006; Label: Giza Studio; Formats: CD, CD+DVD, digital download	19	19,213
U-ka saegusa IN db IV ~Crystal na Kisetsu ni Miserarete~	Released: 25 November 2009; Label: Giza Studio; Formats: CD, CD+DVD, digital download	33	5,999

==== Compilation albums ====
Title	Album details	Peak chart positions	Sales (JPN)
Title	Album details	JPN	Sales (JPN)
U-ka saegusa IN d-best ~Smile & Tears~	Released: 6 June 2007; Label: Giza Studio; Formats: CD, CD+DVD, digital download	5	40,456
U-ka saegusa IN db Final Best	Released: 13 January 2010; Label: Giza Studio; Formats: CD, digital download	30	5,799

=== Extended plays ===
Title	Album details	Peak chart positions	Sales (JPN)
Title	Album details	JPN	Sales (JPN)
Secret & Lies	Released: 5 February 2003; Label: Giza Studio; Formats: CD, digital download	20	30,111

=== Singles ===
==== As a lead artist ====
Title	Year	Peak chart positions	Sales (JPN)	Album
Title	Year	JPN	Sales (JPN)	Album
"Whenever I Think of You"	2002	41	6,580	Secret & Lies
"It's for You"	2002	20	14,610	Secret & Lies
"Tears Go by"	2002	21	12,450	Secret & Lies
"Chu True Love"	2003	20	13,447	U-ka saegusa IN db 1st ~Kimi to Yakusoku Shita Yasashii Ano Basho made~
"I Can't See, I Can't Feel"	2003	36	7,731	U-ka saegusa IN db 1st ~Kimi to Yakusoku Shita Yasashii Ano Basho made~
"Kimi to Yakusoku Shita Yasashii Ano Basho made"	2003	8	33,955	U-ka saegusa IN db 1st ~Kimi to Yakusoku Shita Yasashii Ano Basho made~
"Nemuru Kimi no Yokogao ni Hohoemi wo"	2004	12	25,344	U-ka saegusa IN db II
"Hekonda Kimochi, Tokasu Kimi"	2004	14	16,375	U-ka saegusa IN db II
"Egao de Iyouyo"	2004	12	13,614	U-ka saegusa IN db II
"Itsumo Kokoro ni Taiyou wo"	2004	16	10,117	U-ka saegusa IN db II
"Tobitatenai Watashi ni Anata ga Tsubasa wo Kureta"	2005	24	10,621	U-ka saegusa IN db III
"June Bride ~Anata shika Mienai~"	2005	12	21,712	U-ka saegusa IN db III
"Kimi no Ai ni Tsutsumarete Itai"	2005	20	7,967	U-ka saegusa IN db III
"Ai no Wana"	2006	36	5,288	U-ka saegusa IN db III
"Fall in Love"	2006	32	5,175	U-ka saegusa IN db III
"100 mono Tobira" (with Rina Aiuchi)	2006	8	29,975	Non-album singles
"Everybody Jump"	2006	40	5,541	U-ka saegusa IN db III
"Taiyou"	2006	13	9,457	U-ka saegusa IN d-best: Smile & Tears
"Kumo ni Notte"	2007	12	11,701	U-ka saegusa IN d-best: Smile & Tears
"Nanatsu no Umi wo Wataru Kaze no yōni" (with Rina Aiuchi)	2007	6	36,587	Non-album singles
"Ashita wa Ashita no Kaze no Naka......Yume no Naka"	2007	37	4,515	U-ka saegusa IN db Final Best
"Atarashii Jibun e Kawaru Switch"	2007	37	4,515	U-ka saegusa IN db Final Best
"Yukidoke no Ano Kawa no Nagare no You Ni"	2008	19	12,183	U-ka saegusa IN db IV; ~Crystal na Kisetsu ni Miserarete~
"Daremo ga Kitto Dareka no Santa Claus"	2008	39	3,374	U-ka saegusa IN db IV; ~Crystal na Kisetsu ni Miserarete~
"Mou Kimi wo Hitori ni Sasenai"	2009	59	2,746	U-ka saegusa IN db IV; ~Crystal na Kisetsu ni Miserarete~
"Itsumo Sugao no Watashi de Itai"	2009	42	3,061	U-ka saegusa IN db IV; ~Crystal na Kisetsu ni Miserarete~
"Natsu no Owari ni Anata e no Tegami Kaki Tometeimasu"	2009	71	1,512	U-ka saegusa IN db IV; ~Crystal na Kisetsu ni Miserarete~

== Video albums ==
List of video albums
Title	Album details
U-ka Saegusa in dB Film Collection Vol. 1 -Shocking Blue-	Released: 19 November 2003; Label: B-Vision; Format(s): DVD
U-ka Saegusa in dB [One 1 Live]	Released: 16 February 2005; Label: B-Vision; Format(s): DVD
U-ka Saegusa in dB Film Collection Vol. 2	Released: 21 September 2005; Label: B-Vision; Format(s): DVD
U-ka Saegusa in dB "Choco II to Live"	Released: 1 November 2006; Label: B-Vision; Format(s): DVD
U-ka Saegusa in d-Best Live ~Smile & Tears~	Released: 27 February 2007; Label: Giza Studio; Format(s): DVD
U-ka Saegusa in db Film Collection Vol. 3	Released: 11 June 2008; Label: Giza Studio; Format(s): DVD
U-ka Saegusa in db -Final Live Tour 2010-	Released: 21 April 2010; Label: Giza Studio; Format(s): DVD

=== Collaborations ===
- "The Hit Parade" (with Tak Matsumoto, November 26, 2003)
- "100 Mono Tobira" (100もの扉, with Rina Aiuchi and Sparkling Point, June 14, 2006)
- "Nanatsu no Umi wo Wataru Kaze no You Ni" (七つの海を渡る風のように, (with Aiuchi Rina, April 11, 2007)
