= Lycèe Trading Card Game =

Japanese collectible card game

- The Lycèe Trading Card Game logo.
- Designers: Silver Blitz
- Publishers: Broccoli
- Players: 2
- Chance: Some
- Skills: Card playing

The Lycèe Trading Card Game is a Japanese collectible card game developed by Silver Blitz and published by Broccoli that uses characters from a variety of (mostly) visual novel computer games. Lycée is a French word roughly meaning 'high school'. Most of the cards are given unique, fanmade artwork. The object of the game is to get one's opponent's sixty card deck down to zero, which is mostly done by attacking with character cards.

There are five rarities of cards: common, uncommon, rare, promotional and lucky. The 'lucky' cards are the most valuable, and may sold for as much as 9,800 yen on Japanese secondary markets. By contrast, 'rare' cards sell for between 50 and 1200 yen.

== Gameplay ==
There are four different card 'types': character, event, item and area.

In addition, each card is one of five 'elements': snow (雪, yuki), moon (月, tsuki), flower (花, hana), void (宙, sora), and sun (日, hi). There are also elementless (無, mu) cards symbolized by a star, which can only pay for other elementless cards, but any element can pay for an elementless' cost.

Cards are played by discarding other cards from one's own hand to pay for a card's cost. For example: the Yumemi card pictured is worth if she is discarded ( is her type as shown in the upper-left corner and her worth, 2, is directly below her type) and costs to be played (the cost is shown over the field limitation icon, the six red dots on the left hand side).

== List of games with characters appearing in Lycèe ==
Promo character card of Yumemi from Planetarian: The Reverie of a Little Planet. While most cards are given original, fanmade artwork, this card uses the official artwork due to being a promotional card.

- Maid-san Spirits! (by Sirius)
- Air (by Key)
- Akumu (by StudioMebius)
- Alma (by Bonbee)
- Atlach-Nacha (by AliceSoft)
- Banyōn (by AliceSoft)
- Binary Pot (by August)
- Clannad (by Key)
- Comic Party (by Leaf)
- Daiakuji (by AliceSoft)
- December When There Is No Angel (by Leaf)
- DR2 Night Janki (by Leaf)
- Fate/hollow ataraxia (by Type-Moon)
- Fate/stay night (by Type-Moon)
- Fushigi no Kuni no Kanojo (by Saga Planets)
- Galzoo Island (by AliceSoft)
- Hajimete no Orusuban (by Zero)
- Higurashi No Naku Koro Ni (by 07th Expansion)
- Kanojo-tachi no Ryūgi (by 130 cm)
- Kanon (by Key)
- Kizuato (by Leaf)
- Koigokoro (by Ram)
- Kurenai-hime: Kou Ki (by Saga Planets)
- Kusari (by Leaf)
- Mamahaha Chōkyō (by Giant Panda)
- Mamatoto (by AliceSoft)
- Magical Love Lesson (by Giant Panda)
- Mahō wa Ameiro? (by Sirius)
- Maō to Odore! (by Catwalk)
- Melty Blood (by Type-Moon)
- Moon (by Tactics)
- Negai (by Ram)
- Ōbanchō (by AliceSoft)
- One: Kagayaku Kisetsu e (by Tactics)
- Only You: ReCross (by AliceSoft)
- Osananajimi na Kanojo (by Ego)
- Pastel Chime Continue (by AliceSoft)
- Planetarian: The Reverie of a Little Planet (by Key)
- Princess Brave! (by 130 cm)
- Princess Holiday (by August)
- Prism Ark (by Pencil Production)
- Really? Really! (by Navel)
- Rance VI: Zezu Hōkai (by AliceSoft)
- Rewrite (by Key)
- Ribbon2 (by Bonbee)
- Ribbon95 (by Bonbee)
- Sanoba Witch (by Yuzusoft)
- Senren Banka (by Yuzusoft)
- Shizuku (by Leaf)
- Shoya Kenjō (by Giant Panda)
- Shuffle! (by Navel)
- Snow (by Studio Mebius)
- Soul Link (by Navel)
- Tasogare (by Leaf)
- Tears to Tiara (by Leaf)
- Tenerezza (by Aquaplus)
- Tenshin Ranman (by Yuzusoft)
- Tick! Tack! (by Navel)
- Tōshin Toshi (by AliceSoft)
- To Heart (by Leaf)
- To Heart 2 (by Leaf)
- Tomodachi Ijō Koibito Miman (by Studio Mebius)
- Tomoyo After: It's a Wonderful Life (by Key)
- Tsukihime (by Type-Moon)
- Tsuki wa Higashi ni Hi wa Nishi ni: Operation Sanctuary (by August)
- Uchi no Imōto no Baai (by Ego)
- Ultra Mahō Shōjo Manana (by AliceSoft)
- Umineko no Naku Koro ni (by 07th Expansion)
- Usotsuki wa Tenshi no Hajimari (by Saga Planets)
- Utawarerumono (by Leaf)
- White Album (by Leaf)
- Yoake Mae yori Ruri Iro na (by August)
- Yoru ga Kuru! (by AliceSoft)

== See also ==
- Ani-Mayhem
