= White Album 2 =

Series of Japanese visual novels

- White Album 2 (all-in-one set version) visual novel cover art featuring all five female main characters.

ホワイトアルバム2 (Howaito Arubamu 2)
- Genre: Romance
- Video game

White Album 2: Introductory Chapter
- Developer: Leaf
- Publisher: Leaf
- Directed by: Takeshi Nakamura
- Produced by: Naoya Shimokawa
- Music by: Michio Kinugasa; Junya Matsuoka; Shinya Ishikawa; Kazuhide Nakagami
- Genre: Eroge, visual novel
- Platform: Microsoft Windows
- Released: JP: March 26, 2010
- Video game

White Album 2: Closing Chapter
- Developer: Leaf
- Publisher: Leaf
- Directed by: Kazuo Ninomiya
- Produced by: Naoya Shimokawa
- Music by: Michio Kinugasa; Junya Matsuoka; Shinya Ishikawa; Kazuhide Nakagami
- Genre: Eroge, visual novel
- Platform: Microsoft Windows
- Released: JP: December 22, 2011
- Video game

White Album 2: Shiawase no Mukōgawa
- Developer: Aquaplus
- Publisher: Aquaplus
- Genre: Visual novel
- Platform: PlayStation 3, PlayStation Vita
- Released: PS3: JP: December 20, 2012; PS Vita: JP: November 28, 2013
- Light novel

White Album 2: Yuki ga Tsumugu Senritsu
- Written by: Masaya Tsukishima
- Illustrated by: Takeshi Nakamura; Keiichirō Katsura
- Published by: SoftBank Creative
- Imprint: GA Bunko
- Original run: March 15, 2013 – September 12, 2014
- Volumes: 6
- Manga
- Illustrated by: 2C=Galore
- Published by: SoftBank Creative
- Imprint: GA Bunko Magazine
- Original run: July 11, 2013 – October 22, 2015
- Volumes: 4
- Anime television series
- Directed by: Seiya Numata (Chief); Masaomi Andō
- Produced by: Yūsuke Morii
- Written by: Fumiaki Maruto
- Music by: Shuntarō Kobayashi
- Studio: Satelight
- Licensed by: SA/SEA: Medialink
- Original network: Tokyo MX, MBS, TVA, BS11, AT-X
- Original run: October 6, 2013 – December 29, 2013
- Episodes: 13
- Video game

White Album 2 - Mini-After Story
- Developer: Leaf
- Publisher: Leaf
- Genre: Visual novel
- Platform: Microsoft Windows
- Released: JP: December 25, 2014
- Video game

White Album 2: Extended Edition
- Developer: Leaf
- Publisher: Leaf
- Genre: Eroge, visual novel
- Platform: Microsoft Windows
- Released: JP: February 14, 2018

White Album 2 (ホワイトアルバム2, Howaito Arubamu 2) is a trilogy of Japanese adult visual novels developed by the visual novel company Leaf for the Microsoft Windows PC, and is the sequel to Leaf's earlier visual novel, White Album. The first part of the series, named White Album 2: Introductory Chapter, was released on March 26, 2010.

The second part in the series is named White Album 2: Closing Chapter and was released on December 22, 2011. An all-ages PlayStation 3 version combining both chapters published by Aquaplus was released in 2012 and ported for PlayStation Vita in 2013.

A White Album 2 - Mini-After Story epilogue was released for Windows in 2014. White Album 2: Extended Edition, combining both chapters and the epilogue was released in 2018, also for Windows. The gameplay of White Album 2 follows a linear plotline which offers pre-determined scenarios with courses of interaction. An anime television series adaptation aired in Japan between October and December 2013.

== Gameplay ==
A scene in White Album 2 depicting the protagonist talking to both Setsuna Ogiso and Chikashi Hayasaka. The text can be visible at the bottom and some controls and menus are right-aligned at the bottom of this screen.

The gameplay in White Album 2 requires minimal interaction from the player as the player spends the majority of their time on reading the text that is displayed at the bottom of the screen. Unlike other visual novels, there is only one ending in Introductory Chapter and there are no choices for the player to select.

The player's only interaction with the game during the "introductory chapter" and "mini after story" is to click a button to advance the game by rolling the next line of text onto the screen, while both "closing chapter" and "coda" requires comprehensive multiple choice questions to handle the trend of the plot development.

== Plot ==
White Album 2 takes place in the same initial setting as its predecessor, Hōjō High School, with approximately ten years having elapsed since the events of the first White Album.

Introductory Chapter begins during the second half of October. The story follows third-year Haruki Kitahara, an amateur guitar player who becomes friends with two beautiful girls in his grade: the cheerful aspiring singer and school idol Setsuna Ogiso, and the taciturn pianist Kazusa Touma. Haruki is part of the school's band club, but he and fellow club member Takeya Iizuka become over the fact that all the band members they gathered for the school festival have left. Haruki eventually manages to recruit both girls to also join the band. The trio quickly become best friends, only for both girls to fall desperately in love with Haruki, who shares the sentiments. The band has their first and only performance at the school cultural festival, where They perform Yuki Morikawa's "White Album", Rina Ogata's "Sound of Destiny", and an original song named "Todokanai Koi". When the day draws to an end, Setsuna finds Haruki and confesses to him, and the two of them start going out together. Although Kazusa claims to be supportive of the relationship, she slowly begins to drift apart from the other two. Noticing this, Haruki acts on his feelings for Kazusa, leading to Haruki standing up Setsuna on her birthday, and later to him sleeping with Kazusa. Shortly afterwards, Kazusa moves to Europe and Haruki breaks up with Setsuna, the three going their separate ways. Introductory Chapter is linear and thus has no alternate scenarios.

Closing Chapter begins three years after the events of Introductory Chapter. Haruki, now a university student, tries to move on with his life only for Setsuna to re-emerge, and their latent feelings flare up again. Haruki has three possible love interests in addition to Setsuna: Chiaki Izumi, a student in Haruki's class; Mari Kazaoka, Haruki's boss; and Koharu Sugiura, a new third-year at Hōjō.

Coda takes place two years after Setsuna's Closing Chapter route, where she and Haruki are engaged but live in separate cities for work. Kazusa soon returns to Japan, and she and Haruki rekindle their friendship with the lingering desire for more. There are four possible endings: "Setsuna True", where Haruki re-affirms his love for Setsuna, marrying her and having a child together; "Kazusa True", where Haruki and Kazusa rekindle their affair but choose to be more honest, eventually getting married at Hōjō, "Kazusa Normal", a bad ending where Haruki and Kazusa's affair ends with Haruki ruining his relationships with both women permanently, and CODA normal, an extremely short ending in which Haruki is not willing to fully give himself up to Kazusa after a change of heart and decides on staying with Setsuna despite his wavering feelings. "After Story", a collection of bonus chapters, completes the story as an epilogue. The story has been also expanded with CD Drama and novels.

== Characters ==
Haruki Kitahara (北原 春希, Kitahara Haruki)
Voiced by: Takahiro Mizushima
The protagonist of White Album 2, he is a third year student at Hōjō High School and a member of the light music club and has excellent grades. Haruki plays second guitar and is a student with excellent grades, but is meddlesome and preachy. Lately he's been concentrating on practicing the guitar for the school festival, but he's not talented enough to go on stage.

Setsuna Ogiso (小木曽 雪菜, Ogiso Setsuna)
Voiced by: Madoka Yonezawa
Setsuna Ogiso is the first main heroine. She is the triggering of the plot and the only character with an important role in all the routes, even more than Haruki himself. Setsuna is a third year student at Hōjō High School and has been Miss Hōjō two years in a row and enjoys singing karaoke. She is beautiful and friendly when approached, yet places a wall between herself and others so she has no close friends. She refrains from making friends due to her troubled past during her years in middle school, but she is this way precisely because she was consecutively voted as the prettiest girl in the school, and her classmates all expect her to be a fashionable, wealthy young lady.

Kazusa Touma (冬馬 かずさ, Tōma Kazusa)
Voiced by: Hitomi Nabatame
Kazusa Touma is the second main heroine. She is a third year student at Hōjō and is in the same class as Haruki. She often dozes off in, is late for, and skips class. She is a very talented pianist, and comes from a wealthy family. Kazusa is the daughter of a famous pianist, and a musical genius who dropped out of Hōjō's music division. She puts on a hostile and dismissive front towards everyone. Once Haruki befriends her, she is a valuable ally for the cultural festival. When it comes to music, her passion and confidence is unrivaled.

Io Mizusawa (水沢 依緒, Mizusawa Io)
Voiced by: Ikumi Nakagami
Io is a classmate of Setsuna's and used to be the captain of the basketball team. Io was in the same class as Haruki during first year although the two of have known each other since junior high.

Takeya Iizuka (飯塚 武也, Iizuka Takeya)
Voiced by: Takuma Terashima
Takeya is a close friend of Haruki and is the president of the light music club. Takeya plays the guitar and is surprisingly popular with girls.

== Development ==
The director, artist, and character designer for White Album 2 is Takeshi Nakamura who had previously worked on Leaf's other games such as December When There Is No Angel and the PlayStation 3 port of Tears to Tiara. The scenario for White Album 2 is written by Fumiaki Maruto and Kikakuya. The pair has worked together before on other visual novels such as Kono Aozora ni Yakusoku o. The producer for White Album 2 is Naoya Shimokawa.

According to Shimokawa, Maruto was the one who came up with the original design and concept for White Album 2. After hearing the details from Maruto, Shimokawa felt that Maruto may be able to create a game that surpassed the original and decided to run with the idea. When Nakamura was told that he would be the artist for the game, he went to speak with Hisashi Kawata, the artist for the original White Album, Kawata stated that he wanted to see the painful winter images that Nakamura would create.

Nakamura admits that because White Album 2 is a sequel that he does feel some pressure about the work. Despite being busy with Kimi ga Yobu, Megido no Oka de and the PlayStation 3's Tears to Tiara, Nakamura went ahead and created the character designs for the game even though no one had asked him for them.

When asked about the release date of the second part of the game, Shimokawa stated that it would be nice to release it some time during the winter season to align with the feelings that the title "White Album" evokes. Shimokawa believes that the scenario should be all complete by then and that it would come down to whether the art is completed in time or not. Unlike December When There is No Angel where there were two artists, Nakamura is alone this time and has to work on both the heroines and the supporting characters, making it a rather big effort.

=== Release history ===
A preorder campaign for Introductory Chapter began in September 2009. Preorders that were received within an unspecified time period received a chibi model figure of Setsuna Ogiso. Both the limited and regular editions of Introductory Chapter were originally planned to be released on February 26, 2010, but was delayed to March 26. The limited edition of the game includes a hardcover novel with it. The novel is named Yuki ga Toke, Soshite Yuki ga Furu Made (雪が解け、そして雪が降るまで), and was written by Maruto and illustrated by Nakamura. The novel that comes with Introductory Chapter is told from a different perspective. The novel that comes with Closing Chapter is a story set between the events of Introductory Chapter and the second game. Closing Chapter was released on December 22, 2011.

== Adaptations ==
=== Drama CD ===
A drama CD titled Matsuri no Mae: Futari no 24 Jikan (祭りの前～ふたりの24時間～) was released on August 13, 2010, during Comiket 78. The script was written by Fumiaki Maruto and the illustrations were done by Takeshi Nakamura. A short novel was also included in the drama CD. The premise of the drama CD was about the day before the school festival. Haruki Kitahara, Setsuna Ogiso, and Kazusa Touma are voiced by Takahiro Mizushima, Madoka Yonezawa, and Hitomi Nabatame respectively. After the release of the game, other drama CD have been published.

=== Print ===
A light novel adaptation began releasing on March 16, 2013, under the title White Album 2: Yuki ga Tsumugu Senritsu (WHITE ALBUM 2 雪が紡ぐ旋律). The light novels were written by Masaya Tsukishima and illustrated by Takeshi Nakamura and Keiichirō Katsura. The series completed on September 12, 2014, with six volumes.

A manga adaptation was created and illustrated by 2C=Galore. The manga began serialization on July 11, 2013, in the GA Bunko Magazine and was compiled into four volumes.

=== Anime ===
A 13-episode television series anime adaptation of White Album 2 was announced in the May 2013 issue of Kadokawa Shoten's Monthly Newtype magazine. Masaomi Ando directed the series at studio Satelight. Fumiaki Maruto, the scenario writer for the original games, supervised and wrote the series' scripts and composer Naoya Shimokawa served as the music producer for the anime. It adapted White Album 2: Introductory Chapter. The series aired in Japan between October 5 and December 28, 2013, on Tokyo MX and on MBS, TVA, BS11 and AT-X later. Crunchyroll streamed the series with English subtitles.

No.	Title	Original release date
1	"White Album"	October 5, 2013
2	"Piano and Guitar, Side by Side" "Tonariawase no Piano to Gitā" (隣り合わせのピアノとギター)	October 12, 2013
3	"The Light Music Club, Together Again" "Keiongaku Dōkō Kai、Sai Kessei" (軽音楽同好会、再結成)	October 19, 2013
4	"Sound of Destiny"	October 26, 2013
5	"Touching Hearts" "Fureau Kokoro" (触れあう心)	November 2, 2013
6	"Before the Fair" "Matsuri no Mae" (祭りの前)	November 9, 2013
7	"The Last and Greatest Day" "Saikō no, Saigo no Hi" (最高の、最後の日)	November 16, 2013
8	"And Winter Finally Begins" "Yagate Fuyu ga Hajimatte" (やがて冬が始まって)	November 23, 2013
9	"Two Hearts Passing" "Surechigau Kokoro" (すれ違う心)	November 30, 2013
10	"From When the Snow Melts, To When It Falls Again (Part I)" "Yuki ga Toke, Soshite Yuki ga Furu Made (Zenpen)" (雪が解け、そして雪が降るまで（前編）)	December 7, 2013
11	"From When the Snow Melts, To When It Falls Again (Part II)" "Yuki ga Toke, Soshite Yuki ga Furu Made (Kōhen)" (雪が解け、そして雪が降るまで（後編）)	December 14, 2013
12	"Graduation" "Sotsugyō" (卒業)	December 21, 2013
13	"A Love That Cannot Reach" "Todokanai Koi" (届かない恋)	December 28, 2013

== Music ==
Introductory Chapter has three theme songs, the opening theme "Todokanai Koi" (届かない恋), the ending theme "Twinkle Snow", and the insert song "After All ~Tsuzuru Omoi~" (After All ~綴る想い~). Both the opening theme and insert song is sung by Rena Uehara. The ending theme is performed by Akari Tsuda. Shinya Ishikawa composed both "Todokanai Koi" and "After All: Tsuduru Omoi" while Junya Matsuoka composed "Twinkle Snow".

Matsuoka handled the arrangement of "Todokanai Koi" and Michio Kinugasa arranged "Twinkle Snow" and "After All: Tsuduru Omoi". A CD single containing all three songs was released on May 26, 2010. The single peaked at 65th place in Oricon's rankings for one week.

White Album 2's soundtrack has been deeply praised, along with its connection with the plot. The soundtrack is composed by different composers, such as Naoya Shimokawa, Shinya Ishikawa and Michio Kinugasa, with songs sung by Madoka Yonezawa (Setsuna Ogiso), Rena Uehara and Tsuda Akari. In addition, many CD's with different versions of the songs have been released since White Album 2: Introductory Chapter and Closing Chapter were released.

In 2017, a CD called "White Album 2: Soundtrack ~Kazusa~" was released, with songs of the visual novel sung by Kazusa Touma (Hitomi Nabatame), one of the heroines of the game.

The opening theme to Closing Chapter, "Shiawase na Kioku" (幸せな記憶), was also sung by Rena Uehara.

The anime series uses "Todokanai Koi '13" (届かない恋 '13) as the opening theme and "Closing '13" and "Sayonara no Koto" (さよならのこと) as ending themes, all three performed by Rena Uehara.

== Reception ==
White Album 2: Shiawase no Mukōgawa reviews

Review score
Publication	Score
Famitsu	9/10, 9/10, 9/10, 10/10

Introductory Chapter tied for second place in bishōjo game preorders in Japan between the months of December 2009 and January 2010. It was the second most widely sold PC game in March 2010 on Getchu.com.

Reviewers in Famitsu complimented the PS3 version. They found it to be a human drama made with more raw realism than the usual bishojo game and that it unfolds in such a poignant way it would make the players heart ache.
