= White Album (video game) =

Japanese adult visual novel

- White Album original visual novel cover art featuring Yuki and Rina.

ホワイトアルバム (Howaito Arubamu)
- Genre: Drama, harem, romance
- Video game
- Developer: Leaf
- Publisher: Leaf (Windows); Aquaplus (Remake PS3, PC); DMM Games, Shiravune (Remake Steam release)
- Genre: Eroge, visual novel
- Platform: Windows, PlayStation 3
- Released: Windows: JP: May 1, 1998; Memories like Falling Snow; PS3: JP: June 24, 2010; Windows: JP: March 30, 2012; WW: August 4, 2023
- Manga
- Written by: Leaf
- Illustrated by: Chako Abeno
- Published by: ASCII Media Works
- Magazine: Dengeki Daioh
- Original run: June 27, 2008 – 2010
- Volumes: 3
- Anime television series
- Directed by: Akira Yoshimura (1–13); Taizō Yoshida (14–26)
- Produced by: Akio Mishima
- Written by: Satoru Hiroaki
- Music by: Elements Garden
- Studio: Seven Arcs
- Original network: TV Kanagawa
- Original run: January 3, 2009 – December 25, 2009
- Episodes: 26

White Album (ホワイトアルバム, Howaito Arubamu) is a Japanese adult visual novel developed by Leaf, and was originally released on May 1, 1998, for Microsoft Windows as a CD-ROM. A PlayStation 3 remake published by Aquaplus with several modification was released in 2010 and ported to PC in 2012. It was re-released on PC under the title White Album: Memories like Falling Snow on August 4, 2023, with English and Chinese translations.

White Album has received several transitions to other media. A manga adaptation illustrated by Japanese illustrator Chako Abeno began serialization in the shōnen magazine Dengeki Daioh in August 2008. It was followed by an anime adaptation produced by Seven Arcs, which began broadcast in Japan on January 3, 2009.

== Gameplay ==
A conversation in the original version of White Album. It is played in 4:3 ratio.

The gameplay in White Album requires little player interaction as most of the game's duration is spent on reading the text that appears on the screen, which represents either dialogue between the various characters or the inner thoughts of the protagonist. Before the beginning of every week in the game's storyline, the player is given the option to plan a schedule, and is allowed to participate in various activities or to take the day off for rest. Different events associated with different characters occur depending on the activities the player chooses to participate. During several of these events, the player will also be given the chance to engage the character in a conversation, where he or she may also pick a topic as the basis of the conversation. Every so often, the player will come to a "decision point", where he or she is given the chance to choose from options that are displayed on the screen, typically two to three at a time. The time between these points varies and can occur anywhere from a minute to much longer. Text progression pauses at these points and depending on which choice the player makes, the plot will progress in a specific direction. To view all of the plotlines, the player will need to replay the game multiple times and make different schedules and choices during decision points to progress the plot in an alternate direction.

== Plot and characters ==
The player assumes the role of Tōya Fujii (藤井 冬弥, Fujii Tōya; voiced by: Tomoaki Maeno), White Album's male protagonist. Tōya is a twenty-year-old university student in his second year attending the Yūnagi University (悠凪大学, Yūnagi Daigaku). He has a timid, yet vulgar personality, and is often unorganized. He often laments the lack of time he has to spend with Yuki Morikawa (森川 由綺, Morikawa Yuki; voiced by: Aya Hirano), who he is romantically attracted to. Yuki, White Album's main heroine, is an idol singer who is rising in popularity, and is affiliated with the Ogata Productions. She has a warm and kindhearted personality, and is in her second year at university. She and Tōya were students at the same high school. Rina Ogata (緒方 理奈, Ogata Rina; voiced by: Nana Mizuki), another heroine, is a popular idol singer with the same management agency as Yuki. Rina is elegant and intelligent, and good friends with Yuki. She is lonely because of her busy work schedule and develops feelings for Tōya.

Tōya also meets several other characters throughout the story. Misaki Sawakura (澤倉 美咲, Sawakura Misaki; voiced by: Megumi Takamoto), is a gentle and caring third year university student. She likes to read and cook, and like Yuki, she attended high school with Tōya prior to entering university. Haruka Kawashima (河島 はるか, Kawashima Haruka; voiced by: Nozomi Masu) has known Tōya since kindergarten and is in her second year of university. Haruka is very quiet and although she is athletic, generally prefers leisure sports such as taking walks. She used to play tennis but stopped after her brother's untimely death. Mana Mizuki (観月 マナ, Mizuki Mana; voiced by: Haruka Tomatsu), White Album's fifth heroine, is a high school student whom Tōya tutors. Mana has an impudent and aggressive personality. She is antisocial and dislikes interacting with others, to the extent that at times she skips both school and Tōya's tutoring sessions.

== Development ==
White Album is the sixth game developed by Leaf, after their previous titles such as To Heart. Scenario for White Album was worked on by Udaru Harada, as his second work on a visual novel; scenario assistance was provided by Akihide Takebayashi. Art direction and character designs for the game was provided by Hisashi Kawata. Work on the music for the game was split between three people, Shinya Ishikawa, Kazuhide Nakagami, and Naoya Shimokawa, the president of Aquaplus. Much of the development team, with the exception of Harada, have previously worked on Leaf's previous title, To Heart.

=== Release history ===
White Album was first released to the public on May 1, 1998, as a CD-ROM, playable on Windows 95. The game was later re-released on June 20, 2003, with additional support for later versions of the Microsoft Windows operating system. An all-ages version for the PlayStation 3 entitled White Album: Tsuzurareru Fuyu no Omoide (WHITE ALBUM-綴られる冬の想い出-) was released on June 24, 2010, by Aquaplus, with full-voice acting and additional scenarios, while eliminating simulation elements found in the original release. An all-ages port for Windows XP, Vista, and 7 operating systems, based on the PS3 version, was released for download on the content delivery website DMM.com on March 30, 2012, and a downloadable version of the PS3 game followed on November 27, 2014.

Shimokawa stated that the development team decided to produce a PlayStation 3 version as they wanted to recreate the game in high-definition quality, and because they wanted to provide accessibility for players who have played Tears to Tiara: Kakan no Daichi. The PS3 version employs the Motion Portrait technology in its graphics rendering to create animated sprites. Shimokawa explained that although several other visual novel titles employed 3D computer graphics to create animations, the technology was unable to portray the details that artists maintain in their original illustrations, and the decision to use Motion Portrait was made in order to allow fluid animations to be created using static 2D computer graphics. The technology took the development team a year to perfect, because of complications such as unnatural character movement; Kawata commented that the process took more time than the illustrations to complete. He noted that it was complicated to adapt his character designs for the PS3 version, as he attempted to create an overall design that resembles the graphics found in the original Windows version, but without its dated appearance.

An English and Chinese language localization by Shiravune was released in August 2023 on PC, titled White Album: Memories like Falling Snow. The localization is based on the all-ages PlayStation 3 version.

== Reception and legacy ==
Thomas Knight of NookGaming noted that some routes were weak and missed out on important elements of a guilty romance story, but praised several aspects of the story, along with the graphics and sound.

Characters from White Album are also featured as partner characters Aquapazza: Aquaplus Dream Match, a fighting game developed by Aquaplus with characters from various Leaf games.

A sequel to the original visual novel entitled White Album 2: Introductory Chapter developed by Leaf was released on March 26, 2010. The second part, White Album 2: Closing Chapter was released on December 22, 2011.

== Adaptations ==
=== Manga ===
White Album was first adapted into a manga series illustrated by Japanese illustrator Chako Abeno, known for her previous work on Sola. The manga adaptation began its serialization in the shōnen manga magazine Dengeki Daioh on June 27, 2008, and was published by ASCII Media Works in three compiled volumes.

=== Anime ===
White Album has also received an anime adaptation based on the visual novel. The anime series, produced by Seven Arcs, directed by Akira Yoshimura and written by Hiroaki Satō, is broadcast in two sets of thirteen episodes. The first thirteen episodes began broadcasting in Japan on January 3, 2009, on the TV Kanagawa broadcasting network, and was followed by other networks later the same month. A second set of thirteen episodes was broadcast in Fall 2009. In a magazine published interview, producer Akio Mishima and Aquaplus' president Naoya Shimokawa stated that an anime adaptation was considered by King Records as early as the time the visual novel was released, but was not discussed until three years prior to the interview.

== Music ==
Three pieces of theme music were used in the visual novel. The opening theme, "White Album", also used as an insert song, was performed and written by a ghostwriter and is credited to Yuki Morikawa, one of the heroines of the game, and was composed by Shinya Ishikawa. The insert song, "Sound of Destiny", was credited to Rina Ogata, another heroine, for performance, and was written by Shōko Sudani and composed by Kazuhide Nakagami. The ending theme, "Powder Snow", was sung by Akko, and was written by Sudani and composed by Naoya Shimokawa. Each song, with the exception of the ending theme which was arranged solely by Shimokawa, was arranged by Junya Matsuoka and the songs' respective composers. A maxi single titled "White Album" was later released on December 23, 1998, containing the three theme songs.

The opening theme to the first season of the anime adaptation is "Shin'ai" performed by Nana Mizuki and the ending theme is "Maiochiru Yuki no Yō ni" performed by Suara. The opening theme to the second season of the anime adaption is "Mugen" also performed by Nana Mizuki and the ending theme is "Akai Ito" performed by Suara; both were released on October 28, 2009. Five insert singles were also released under the names of the main heroines. "White Album" and "Koi iro sora" were performed by Aya Hirano as Yuki Morikawa; and "Sound of Destiny" and "Powder Snow" by Nana Mizuki as Rina Ogata. A final single, "Powder Snow (Live Ver.)" was released by both singers as a duet. The soundtrack and character songs were compiled into the album, White Album Character Song Best & Soundtrack.
