= Aquapazza: Aquaplus Dream Match =

2011 video game

- Japanese game cover
- Developers: Examu (Team Arcana); Aquaplus
- Publishers: Arcade, PlayStation 3: JP: Aquaplus; NA: Atlus; Microsoft Windows: WW: DMM GAMES, Shiravune
- Platforms: Arcade; PlayStation 3 Microsoft Windows
- Release: Arcade: JP: June 22, 2011; PlayStation 3: JP: August 30, 2012; NA: November 19, 2013; Microsoft Windows: WW: September 25, 2025
- Genre: 2D Versus fighting
- Modes: Single-player, multiplayer
- Arcade system: Taito Type X²

Aquapazza: Aquaplus Dream Match (アクアパッツァ アクアプラスドリームマッチ, Akuapattsa Akuapurasu Dorīmu Matchi) is a 2011 2D arcade fighting game co-developed by Examu (now Team Arcana) and Aquaplus. It is a joint collaboration between Aquaplus and Leaf, who developed all the titles and featured characters. The "Dream Match" in the title references the characters of the game coming together from various Aquaplus titles, including Utawarerumono, Tears to Tiara, and To Heart.

The game was released in Japan on June 22, 2011, with a PlayStation 3 version later released on August 30, 2012, followed by a U.S. release on November 19, 2013. Two updated versions called Aquapazza Version 1.5A and Aquapazza Version 2.0 added several new characters. Aquapazza and Version 2.0 were among the featured titles at the 2011 and 2012 Tougeki tournament.

A Microsoft Windows version was announced on November 24, 2024 and released on September 25, 2025.

== Characters ==
From Utawarerumono

- Hakuowlo (ハクオロ) Player
- Karura (カルラ) Player
- Touka (トウカ) Player
- Oboro (オボロ) Player, Added in Aquapazza Version 2.0
- Urtori (ウルトリィ) Partner
- Kamyu (カミュ) Partner

From Tears to Tiara

- Arawn (アロウン) Player
- Morgan (モルガン) Player
- Riannon (リアンノン) Player
- Rathty (ラスティ) Partner
- Octavia (オクタヴィア) Partner
- Llyr (スィール) Partner, Added in Aquapazza Version 2.0

From To Heart, To Heart 2 and To Heart 2: Dungeon Travelers

- Kousaka Tamaki (向坂環) Player
- Yuzuhara Konomi (柚原このみ) Player
- Komaki Manaka (小牧愛佳) Player
- Multi (マルチ) Player
- Kusugawa Sasara (久寿川ささら) Player, Added in Aquapazza Version 1.5A
- Tonami Yuma (十波由真) Partner
- Ma-ryan (まーりゃん) Partner, Boss
- Kurusugawa Serika (来栖川芹香) Partner, Added in Aquapazza Version 2.0

From Kizuato

- Kashiwagi Chizuru (柏木千鶴) Player (Added in Aquapazza Version 2.0), Boss (Added in PlayStation 3 version)

From Routes

- Yuasa Satsuki (湯浅皐月) Partner

From Comic Party

- Takase Mizuki (高瀬瑞希) Partner
- Inagawa Yu (猪名川由宇) Partner, Added in Aquapazza Version 1.5A

From White Album

- Morikawa Yuki (森川由綺) Partner
- Ogata Rina (緒方理奈) Partner

== Reception ==
Reception

Aggregate score
Aggregator	Score
Metacritic	75/100

Review scores
Publication	Score
Destructoid	8.5/10
Famitsu	26/40
GameSpot	7/10
GameZone	7/10
Hardcore Gamer	4/5
IGN	7/10
Jeuxvideo.com	16/20
Play	70%
USgamer	4/5
Anime News Network	B−

The PlayStation 3 version received "generally favorable reviews" according to the review aggregation website Metacritic.

Bradly Halestorm of Hardcore Gamer said that "It may lack high-class refinement in certain areas, and the cast of fighters probably won’t be recognizable to those outside of the Japanese gaming scene, but those issues are incredibly minor when put up against the bigger picture — which in this case is a sound, robust fighting game." Mandi Odoerfer of GameZone praised the game's Active Emotion System, saying that it "eliminates some of the fighting genre's biggest annoyances". In Japan, Famitsu gave it a score of two sevens and two sixes for a total of 26 out of 40.
