= Stella Women's Academy, High School Division Class C3 =

Japanese manga and anime series

- Stella Women's Academy, High School Division Class C^{3}
- Cover of first manga volume featuring Yura Yamato

特例措置団体ステラ女学院高等科C^{3}部 (Tokurei Sochi Dantai Sutera Jo-Gakuin Kōtō-ka C^{3}-Bu)
- Genre: Comedy, slice of life, sports
- Manga

Tokurei Sochi Dantai Stella Jo-Gakuin Chūtō-ka C^{3}-Bu
- Written by: Ikoma, Getsumin
- Illustrated by: Kokudō 12-gō, Getsumin
- Published by: Enterbrain
- Magazine: Famitsu Comic Clear
- Original run: April 1, 2010 – February 24, 2012
- Volumes: 2
- Manga
- Written by: Ikoma
- Illustrated by: Tomomoka Midori
- Published by: Kodansha
- Imprint: Yanmaga KC Special
- Magazine: Monthly Young Magazine
- Original run: May 9, 2012 – December 16, 2013
- Volumes: 3
- Manga

4-koma Shīkyūbu
- Written by: Ikoma
- Illustrated by: Tomomoka Midori
- Published by: Kodansha
- Imprint: Young Magazine Comics
- Magazine: Kodansha Comic Plus
- Original run: February 14, 2013 – October 5, 2013
- Volumes: 1
- Anime television series
- Directed by: Masayoshi Kawajiri
- Music by: Kōtarō Nakagawa
- Studio: Gainax
- Licensed by: AUS: Crunchyroll (Note: Through Crunchyroll Store Australia (previously Madman Anime)); NA: Sentai Filmworks
- Original network: TBS, Sun TV, CBC, BS-TBS
- Original run: July 4, 2013 – September 26, 2013
- Episodes: 13

Stella Women's Academy, High School Division Class C^{3} (Japanese: 特例措置団体ステラ女学院高等科C^{3}部, Hepburn: Tokurei Sochi Dantai Sutera Jo-Gakuin Kōtō-ka Shīkyūbu; lit. "Preferential Measure Organization Stella Women's Academy, High School Division Class C^{3}"), also known by the abbreviation C^{3}-Bu (C^{3}部, Shīkyūbu), is a manga series written by Ikoma and illustrated by Tomomoka Midori. The manga, which is a follow-up to the 2010 web manga series Tokurei Sochi Dantai Stella Jo-Gakuin Chūtō-ka C^{3}-Bu, was published in Kodansha's Monthly Young Magazine from May 2012 to December 2013. An anime television adaptation by Gainax aired in Japan between July and September 2013.

== Plot ==
Yura Yamato has just transferred to the prestigious Stella Women's Academy (ステラ女学院, Sutera Jogakuin) and discovers that it is difficult to find friends in her first day at school. It is there that she comes across the school's airsoft club, aptly named the C^{3} Club (C^{3}部, Shīkyūbu; derived from command, control and communications), and winds up becoming one of its members. The story revolves around Yura's experiences as a member of the C^{3} Club and her interactions with her fellow members.

== Characters ==
=== Stella Women's Academy ===
Yura Yamato (大和 ゆら, Yamato Yura)
Voiced by: Yui Makino
A freshman in Stella Women's Academy who recently transferred from an unnamed middle school. She possesses a timid personality and a vivid imagination. Since middle school, she has been struggling in making friends, and ends up in the C^{3} Club after meeting Sonora and the others. She is initially shy, but as she participates in more matches and engaging in self driven personal training, she becomes a lot more focused and becomes formidable enough to fight on par and possibly surpass Sonora and Rin, which both are arguble the most refined best gunslinger around. She has an active imagination that lets her envision her matches like real battles, which often helps hone her instincts. She carries an Škorpion vz. 61 submachine gun replica as her weapon which was given to her by Sonora.
Sonora Kashima (鹿島 そのら, Kashima Sonora)
Voiced by: Miyuki Sawashiro
Third year student in Stella Women's Academy and the club president of C^{3} Club. She is known for her good looks in contrast to her rather rough personality. Sonora is Yura's roommate and, upon her return from a competition in America, becomes Yura's trainer in handling firearms. Among the C^{3} Club, Sonora is feared for her expertise in fighting using a variety of firearms, although she seems to show a preference to using two handguns at the same time. She owns an IMI Desert Eagle replica pistol and several competitive shooting items, which she stores in her room. In the end of ep.1 she uses real IMI Desert Eagle in .50AE participating in shooting competition. She is the one who gave Yura her vz. 61 scorpion, which she in turn received from her "master"; an American airsoft enthusiast and soldier who supposedly served under a famous unit and was killed in action.
Rento Kirishima (霧島 れんと, Kirishima Rento)
Voiced by: Rima Nishizaki
First year student in Stella Women's Academy. She is the moodmaker of the C^{3} Club, a natural airhead and a friendly face. She acts as a supportive unit, helping out her allies in combat. She is seen in the opening with a replica AK-47. Her family runs a sweets shop and as a result has an affinity for baked goods and sweets in general.
Karila Hatsuse (初瀬 カリラ, Hatsuse Karira)
Voiced by: Ai Kayano
Second year student of Stella Women's Academy. She is three-fourths Japanese. Karila is known not only for her tomboyish personality, but her single-minded character. Karila is considered to be the C^{3} Club's ace, known for her unparalleled mobility and expertise in close-quarters combat. She is seen mostly using an FN P90 replica as her primary weapon.
Honoka Mutsu (陸奥 ほのか, Mutsu Honoka)
Voiced by: Chiwa Saitō
Second year student of Stella Women's Academy. She often shows a calm personality and a sharp mind, and is also known for being an honors student academically. In combat, she acts as the commander, directing her allies in battle and formulating tactics. She uses a scoped k (kurz) version of the Heckler and Koch G36.
Yachiyo Hinata (日向 八千代, Hinata Yachiyo)
Voiced by: Madoka Yonezawa
A first-year student in Stella Women's Academy, and the energetic "spoiled child" of C^{3} Club. She is the granddaughter of Stella Women's Academy's chairman. Her strong point is long-ranged combat using sniper rifles. Yachiyo owns an Accuracy International L96 AWS replica manufactured by Tokyo Marui.

=== Other characters ===
Rin Haruna (榛名 凛, Haruna Rin)
Voiced by: Asami Seto
A student at Meisei Girl's Academy. She is the leader of her academy's survival game club, the longtime nemesis of the C^{3} Club. She is a friend of Sonora, having been her teammate during competitions in America. After the death of her master, she adopted a philosophy to not show any weakness, thus leading her to play airsoft by routing the opponent rather than completing the objective.
Aoi Seto (瀬戸 葵, Seto Aoi)
Voiced by: Kana Ueda
Leader of the Seto Family survival game team. She is from the Kansai region.
Aila Hatsuse (初瀬 アイラ, Hatsuse Aira)
Voiced by: Ai Kayano
Karila's twin brother, who is a member of Sendou Academy's Opera Club, who also participates in airsoft. With his acting skills, he is capable of impersonating his sister.

== Media ==
=== Manga ===
Stella Women's Academy, High School Division Class C^{3} is a sequel of the web manga series, Tokurei Sochi Dantai Stella Jo-Gakuin Chūtō-ka C^{3}-Bu (特例措置団体ステラ女学院中等科C3部, Stella Women's Academy, Middle School Division Class C^{3}), that was written by Ikoma and Getsumin and illustrated by Kokudō 12-gō and Getsumin, and published by Enterbrain on their Famitsu Comic Clear site between April 1, 2010, and February 24, 2012. There have been two volumes of the web series published on January 15, 2011, and May 14, 2011. Stella Women's Academy, High School Division Class C^{3} is written by Ikoma and illustrated by Tomomoka Midori, and published by Kodansha in their Monthly Young Magazine. The series was published from May 9, 2012, to December 16, 2013, and compiled into three tankōbon volumes, released between January 4, 2013, and February 6, 2014. A 4-panel manga series also by Ikoma and Tomomoka Midori, titled 4-koma Shīkyūbu (4コマしーきゅーぶ) was published on Kodansha's Comic Plus website. The series' 252 strips were published between February 14 and October 5, 2013, and half of them were collected in a tankōbon volume, released on August 6, 2013.

=== Anime ===
An anime television series adaptation aired on TBS between July 4 and September 26, 2013, and was simulcast by Crunchyroll. The series is directed by Masayoshi Kawajiri and produced by Gainax, with character designs by Manami Umeshita and music by Kōtarō Nakagawa. The opening theme is "Shape My Story" by Anna Yano and the ending theme, "Hajikero! Shīkyūbu!" (弾けろ！しーきゅーぶ！; Shoot 'em! C^{3} Club!) by Yui Makino, Miyuki Sawashiro, Ai Kayano, Chiwa Saitō, Rima Nishizaki and Madoka Yonezawa. The anime has been licensed by Sentai Filmworks in North America and released on home video in 2014.

==== Episode list ====
No.	Title	Original release date
1	"Any Volunteers to Enlist!?" "Shigan-hei wa Inai no ka~!?" (志願兵ハ居ナイノカッ!?)	July 4, 2013
Yura Yamato, a shy girl with little confidence, enrolls into the prestigious Stella Women's Academy, where she struggles with making friends. After finding her arranged dorm roommate, Sonora Kashima, is out visiting her family, Yura looks around the room and is surprised to find an array of guns, military items and action movies. Elsewhere, the curious C^{3} Club discusses how best to recruit new members. Whilst fetching some equipment from Sonora's room, C^{3} member Rento Kirishima discovers Yura becoming heavily engrossed in a Rambo movie and decides to drag Yura to the clubroom. Whilst initially assuming the club is a laid back and ladylike one, Yura is surprised when she learns the club's activities actually revolve around airsoft guns and tactical simulation. After luring Yura back with some cake, the club invites her to try out a Rambo-style game, in which one member, Karila Hatsuse, acts as Rambo whilst the other members, Rento, Honoka Mutsu and Yachiyo Hinata, along with Yura, are the sheriffs trying to take her down. Despite not being able to win, Yura gets a sense of excitement from the battle.
2	"I Am Charged with Guarding the Lady" "Ware, Reijō Shuei o Haimeisu." (我、令嬢守衛ヲ拝命ス。)	July 11, 2013
Yura finally meets Sonora, who had returned from a shooting contest in America and becomes impressed by her skills at making onigiri, reminding her of her own marksmen training. Revealing herself to be the president of the C^{3} Club, Sonora asks Yura if she wants to officially join, but Yura doesn't have enough confidence to agree. Meanwhile, the other members try their own hair-brained schemes to get Yura to join, with little success. Becoming impatient and not giving Yura time to give an honest reply, the members challenge Yura and Sonora to an escort match, in which Yura must safely escort an unarmed Sonora, stating that if they lose, Yura will be forced to join the club. Sonora manages to take Yachiyo down with her own weapon whilst Yura manages to use a clever rouse to get Rento and Honoka to take each other out. As Yura becomes nervous about facing Karila, Sonora tells her to think of her gun as an onigiri and together they manage to take down Karila. No longer pressured to join, Yura decides to join the C^{3} Club of her own free will.
3	"Does Enemy Fire Pierce Even the Soul?" "Tekidan wa, Tamashii Mademo Zenbu Kudakan ya?" (敵弾ハ、魂マデモ砕カンヤ？)	July 18, 2013
The girls enter a national high-school airsoft tournament, which follows capture the flag rules. The girls win the first round after Yura grabs the opponent's flag and the team continue their winning streak all the way to the finals. There, they are to face Meisei Girls' Academy, who they've always drawn against on previous encounters, one of their members being Rin Harada, who was Sonora's partner in America. As the match gets underway, Meisei prove to be tough opponents, as they manage to take out the majority of Stella's team, with only Yura remaining. Yura becomes more panicked when she overhears Rin being more focused on taking down every member instead of just stealing their flag and decides to forfeit out of fear. Afterwards, Rin scolds Yura for her cowardice, with Sonora sharing the sentiment. As Yura ponders over her actions, she realizes that if she wants to change, she'll have to make the changes herself. The next day, Yura comes into school with her hair cut and asks not to be called by any nicknames, saying she will take airsoft more seriously from now on.
4	"Learn to Hit the Target Without Firing" "Fui no Iwomochitō Tarubeshi." (不射ノ射ヲモチ当タルベシ。)	July 25, 2013
Sonora and Rento decide to give Yura some training at an Inari shrine, with Sonora lending Yura a Škorpion vz. 61 airsoft gun she got from her teacher. Along the way, Yura thinks she can see a white fox, but the others pass it off as her active imagination. They first task Yura with hitting a dangling coin, teaching her to aim without aiming. Although she manages to hit it at a close distance, she starts to struggle afterwards. As the group head back for the day, Yura discovers her gun has gone missing and rushes back to the shrine alone to search for it. There, she meets a curious warrior spirit named Choujirou, who shows Yura a world that blends his tragic past with Yura's delusional world. He tries to have Yura prevent his own death by an arrow, but she is unable to pull it off. Upon returning to the dorms and hearing that the Skorpion is nicknamed Choujirou, Yura tells what she experienced to Sonora, who tells her about her teacher who was killed in action. The next day, as Yura returns to the shrine to reenter that world, Rento finds herself brought into the world as well, where she witnesses her shoot the arrow, which in real life translates to her hitting the coin right in the center from a long distance. As a reward, Sonora allows Yura to keep the Skorpion.
5	"A Remote Island Game Burns Hot" "Kotō Botsukoha-netsuku Moeyu" (孤島ボツコハ熱ク萌ユ。)	August 1, 2013
The C^{3} Club travels to a remote island for a practice match against the Seto Family team from Kansai, which they manage to win thanks to Yura's quick thinking. After the match, they spend the rest of the evening having a barbecue and setting off fireworks. Later that night, Yura has a nightmare about falling back to her old self and becomes determined to win the next match. The next morning, when everyone's flags are accidentally burned, they decide to have a Capture the Center Flag match using bikini tops instead. As the match gets underway, Sonora notices Yura is a bit more fired up than usual whilst the other members struggle due to the Seto team's strategy of using dual weapons to confuse their numbers. With Yura's help, the C^{3} Club manage to overcome the Seto team's strategy and win the match, though Sonora does not seem happy about it.
6	""Operation: Soak" is Underway" ""Nurenure Sakusen" Hatsudō seri." (「ヌレヌレ作戦」発動セリ。)	August 8, 2013
With the club holding back on sweets to save for an upcoming 24-hour tournament, Sonora suggests they raise the money for the tournament by holding a stand at the school fair so that they can happily buy sweets with their own funds. However, this turns out to be a crayfish-related disaster, and they are soon left with no money for either. Deciding to work with what they've got, they decide to put on a cosplay shooting café, with Sonora managing to borrow a portable shooting range. As the festival gets underway, the club is visited by Karira's twin brother, Aira, who is from Seikou Academy's opera club, also planning to enter the 24-hour tournament. In order to draw in more customers, Honoka puts together a bikini water pistol fight display. When it is Yura and Sonora's turn to duel, Yura ends up landing a hit on Sonora whilst she was distracted by a kid bumping into Rento. Although the club manages to raise enough money for the tournament, they discover after the festival that the shooting range had become broken due to the water fights.
7	"An Assassin's Bullet Cannot Kill a Kindred Spirit" "Kyōdan ni Dōshi wa Taorenu" (凶弾ニ同志ハ斃レヌ。)	August 15, 2013
On their way home, Yura and Sonora come under attack by a sniper using an illegally modified airsoft gun firing dangerous rounds. As Yura attempts to go after the sniper herself, Sonora injures herself protecting Yura from running into the path of a car, leaving her with a twisted ankle which puts her out of the tournament. Feeling guilty, Yura becomes determined to take Sonora's place in the tournament, spending all of her free time looking up strategies and putting the others through an intense training regime. Upon arriving at the tournament, where they meet Seikou Academy's full team, Yura becomes suspicious that Rin might be the sniper.
8	"Should a Commander Be Hard of Heart?" "Shirei wa Hijō Tarubekika?" (司令ハ非情タルベキカ？)	August 22, 2013
The tournament begins, with teams tasked with obtaining flags and bringing them to a safe zone to avoid elimination. Thanks to Yura's strategy, Stella manage to take Seikou's flag and pass the first round. As the team progresses through the various rounds, Yachiyo becomes irritated by Yura constantly scolding Rento. By nightfall, only Stella and Meisei remain in the tournament. Before the final round, Yura goes to see Rin, whose cold words only serve to make Yura more determined to beat her. As the round begins, Yura goes up against Rin, who runs out of bullets. Yura then gets hit by another person's shot, but chooses to fire at Rin anyway, leading Stella to be declared the winners.
9	"Thus, the Party Ends" "Kakushite Utage wa Owaru" (斯クシテ宴ハ終ワル。)	August 29, 2013
After Sonora is discharged from hospital, Yura confesses to everyone that she violated the 'zombie rule', in which players cannot shoot other players once they have been hit themselves. Yura informed the tournament holders about this, but Rin tells them they didn't violate any rules so their victory stands. Not content with this decision, Yura states she wants to face off against Meisei again, but is met with objection from the others, who can no longer hold back their frustrations with Yura's recent behaviour. Yura confronts Rin over why she kept quiet about her cheating, to which she responds that she just have faith in herself. After seeing a news report of Rin helping to capture the real sniper, stating some words that she heard Sonora use before, Yura calls Sonora to the shrine to ask what her relationship with Rin was. Sonora explains how she and Rin met in America and became friends whilst learning airsoft. However, after their instructor was killed in action, Rin felt having weakness was fatal and became focused on airsoft, eventually drifting apart from Sonora. Feeling she has nothing more to learn from them, Yura decides to quit the C^{3} Club.
10	"Brothers in Arms are Bound to Disappear" "Senyū wa Mina, Kieyukumono nari" (戦友ハ皆、消エ行クモノ也。)	September 5, 2013
Yura joins up with Meisei's airsoft club, which the C^{3} Club come to learn of after Aira spots her and informs Karilla. However, Yura becomes upset when Rin assigns her as a medic role during a match that they narrowly lose, feeling she could've won if she was a regular attacker. As Rin tells her to figure out the reason for herself, Yura assumes she needs to get stronger and begins training herself intensely, bringing worry to Rento when she comes to visit her. After another medic match, Rin informs Yura that she is ignoring the team and focusing too much on her own victories. During another match, in which one of Meisei's girls injures herself, Yura ignores coming to her aid in favor of winning the match. Rin becomes disappointed in Yura, stating that she is only fighting for her own self-satisfaction, and takes her off the team. Thinking over all her actions, Yura falls into depression, feeling she has no place to return to. Meanwhile, Sonora has a phone call from her mother concerning an abroad placement.
11	"Unfit for Further Combat" "Tsugi-sen Nōryoku Sundeni Mushi." (継戦能力既ニ無シ。)	September 12, 2013
Sonora informs the others about her plans to transfer to America at the end of the month, leaving the other C^{3} Club members downhearted. Wanting everyone together for an airsoft-style send-off, Rento searches for Yura, eventually finding her at the arcade in a sorry state. With Yura seemingly residing herself to be a no-good person, Rento snaps at her, telling her to think about how others feel. Noticing Sonora also appears to be waiting for Yura to return, the girls make it their mission to make Yura rejoin the club. Meanwhile, Sonora is visited by Rin, who tells her about Yura's performance and suggests Sonora should act more like she used to. As Yura starts to really miss her friends, she is drawn to the shrine where she once again meets Choujirou, who tells Yura that she needs to accept herself. Finding her old gun in the shrine, Yura overcomes her self-pity and shows up to challenge Sonora in her send-off match.
12	"Go Out with Guns Blazing" "Atatte, Hajikero." (当タッテ、弾ケロ。)	September 19, 2013
Sonora challenges Yura to a one-on-one match, matching each other move for move and rekindling their excitement for airsoft. In the middle of the match, Rento comes by to give Yura some more ammo, earning her thanks for inviting her, whilst Karilla comes to support Sonora, with the entire club soon getting involved and turning the game into a free-for-all. As the day comes to an end, Yura urges everyone to keep fighting til the last pellet is fired, bringing everyone into her dream world where they fight against the entire academy. With the day finally coming to an end, Sonora invites Yura and the others to come visit her any time. After Sonora leaves for America, Yura takes some initiative and invites some other students to join the C^{3} Club.
13	"The Foot Soldier is the Queen of the Battle" "Hohei wa Ikusa no Jo-ō tare." (歩兵ハ戦ノ女王タレ。)	September 26, 2013
As the club finds itself running low on BB pellets, the girls enter a Field Queen Contest (which features Daishichi and Sonora as commentators), in which contestants compete with both beauty and airsoft, to try and win some more. After various rounds of airsoft against various players, including Rin, Aoi and Aira, the final pits Karila against Honoka, which Honoka wins by using her sex appeal to earn the popular vote.
