= To Heart 2 =

Video game

- To Heart 2 original visual novel cover
- Genre: Romance, harem
- Video game
- Developer: Leaf
- Publisher: Aquaplus
- Genre: Visual novel
- Platform: PS2, Windows, PSP, PS3
- Released: December 28, 2004 (PS2)
- Manga
- To Heart 2 (Haruka Ogataya); To Heart 2: Colorful Note; To Heart 2 SD: Seitokai Days; To Heart 2 Another Days
- Anime television series
- Directed by: Norihiko Sutō
- Produced by: Hiroyuki Ōmori; Yūtarō Mochizuki; Takayuki Matsunaga; Takayuki Nagatani
- Written by: Hiroshi Yamaguchi
- Music by: Conisch; Kei Haneoka
- Studio: OLM Team Iguchi
- Licensed by: NA: Maiden Japan
- Original network: Television Kanagawa
- Original run: October 3, 2005 – January 2, 2006
- Episodes: 13
- Original video animation
- Directed by: Yasuhisa Katō; Junichi Sakata (Assistant)
- Produced by: Yūtarō Mochizuki
- Written by: Naruaki Kobayashi (#1–2); Hideo Tsukinaga (#2–3)
- Studio: Aquaplus (Production); Chaos Project (Animation)
- Released: February 28, 2007 – September 28, 2007
- Runtime: 30 minutes each
- Episodes: 3
- Video game

To Heart 2 Another Days
- Developer: Leaf
- Publisher: Aquaplus
- Genre: Eroge, Visual novel
- Platform: Windows, PlayStation 3
- Released: February 29, 2008
- Original video animation

To Heart 2 AD
- Directed by: Yasuhisa Katō; Junichi Sakata (Assistant)
- Produced by: Yūtarō Mochizuki
- Written by: Takamitsu Kōno (#1); Naruaki Kobayashi (#2)
- Studio: Aquaplus (Production); Chaos Project (Animation)
- Released: March 26, 2008 – August 8, 2008
- Runtime: 30 minutes each
- Episodes: 2
- Original video animation

To Heart 2 AD Plus
- Directed by: Junichi Sakata; Yasuhisa Katō (Assistant)
- Produced by: Yūtarō Mochizuki
- Written by: Naruaki Kobayashi; Takamitsu Kōno (#1); Eki Sakurajima (#1)
- Studio: Aquaplus (Production); Chaos Project (Animation)
- Released: April 24, 2009 – October 17, 2009
- Runtime: 30 minutes each
- Episodes: 2
- Video game

Manaka de Ikuno!!
- Developer: Leaf
- Publisher: Aquaplus
- Genre: Eroge, Visual novel
- Platform: Windows
- Released: December 18, 2009
- Original video animation

To Heart 2 AD Next
- Directed by: Junichi Sakata
- Produced by: Yūtarō Mochizuki
- Written by: Naruaki Kobayashi (#1); Takamitsu Kōno (#2)
- Music by: To Heart 2 TV (Note: 「ToHeart2(TV-series)」 フロンティアワークス より); Conisch; Kei Haneoka; To Heart 2 (PS2) (Note: 「ToHeart2(PS2)」 AQUAPLUS より); Shinya Ishikawa; Michio Kinugasa; Junya Matsuoka; Kazuhide Nakagami; Naoya Shimokawa
- Studio: Aquaplus (Production); Chaos Project (Animation)
- Released: September 23, 2010 – December 22, 2010
- Runtime: 30 minutes each
- Episodes: 2
- Game
- To Heart 2: Dungeon Travelers
- Original video animation
- To Heart 2: Dungeon Travelers
- Video game

Pachislot To Heart 2
- Developer: Sammy
- Publisher: Sammy; Aquaplus (PS3)
- Genre: Pachinko slot, simulation
- Platform: Arcade, PlayStation 3
- Released: February 2012

To Heart 2 (stylized as ToHeart2) is a Japanese romance visual novel developed by Leaf and published by Aquaplus. It was first released for the PlayStation 2 on December 28, 2004 as an all-ages title, and was followed by an adult version playable on Microsoft Windows and subsequent all-ages versions for the PlayStation Portable and PlayStation 3. This deviated from the release history of the game's predecessor, To Heart, which was originally released with adult content prior to receiving versions with such content removed. The gameplay in To Heart 2 follows a branching plotline with multiple endings, which offers pre-determined scenarios and courses of interaction based on the player's decisions. Its story centers on the male protagonist Takaaki Kouno, and focuses on the appeal of the female main characters.

The game was positively received in both sales and popularity. Its original PlayStation 2 release sold more than 82,000 copies in its first week of release in Japan, and it was voted as the third best bishōjo game by the readers of Dengeki G's Magazine in 2007. It has since received several spin-off titles, including a sequel entitled To Heart 2 Another Days, which was released on February 29, 2008 for Windows, and has also made transitions to other media. There have been six anime adaptations of To Heart 2: an anime television adaptation produced by OLM's Team Iguchi, which was first broadcast in Japan between October 3, 2005 and January 2, 2006; and five original video animation series produced by Aquaplus and Chaos Project. Four manga series, fifteen sets of manga anthologies, three Internet radio shows, two drama CDs, and six novel adaptations based on To Heart 2 have also been produced.

== Gameplay ==
Average dialogue and narrative in To Heart 2 depicting the main character Takaaki talking to Manaka.

To Heart 2 is a romance "novel-type adventure game" in which the player assumes the role of Takaaki Kouno, who begins his second year of high school after reuniting with a childhood friend. Much of its gameplay is spent on reading the story's narrative and dialogue. The text in the game is accompanied by character sprites, which represent who Takaaki is talking to, appearing over background artwork. Throughout the game, the player encounters CG artwork at certain points in the story, which take the place of the background art and character sprites. A gallery of the viewed CGs and played background music is available on the game's title screen. To Heart 2 follows a branching plotline with multiple endings, and depending on the decisions that the player makes during the game, the plot will progress in a specific direction.

The game divides each school day of the storyline into four segments. These segments illustrate the events that occur during Takaaki's commute to school, during school, after school, and after he returns home at the end of each day. Depending on the time of the day and the player's actions, he or she may be presented one of three types of events: mandatory events, which occur automatically during certain points in the game's plotline; temporary events, which occur during certain periods of time only if specific conditions are met; or after school events, which occur at the end of each school day.

At the end of each school day, the player will be given the option to navigate to various locations within the game's setting. Each choosable location is accompanied by an image of a heroine in order to allow the choices to be easier to make. Throughout gameplay, the player is given multiple options to choose from. Text progression pauses at these points, and depending on the choices that the player makes, the affection rate of the heroine associated with the event will either increase, decrease, or remain the same. This mechanism determines which direction of the plot the player will progress into, but influences the story only during Konomi's and Karin's plot lines.

In the PlayStation 2 version, there are nine plotlines that the player will have the chance to experience, one for each of the heroines in the story except Sango and Ruri, who share the same plotline. This is expanded to ten plot lines in the Windows and PlayStation Portable versions with the addition of Sasara's scenario, and further expanded to eleven scenarios in the PlayStation 3 version with the addition of Mio's scenario. In order to view all of the plotlines, the player will have to replay the game multiple times and make different decisions to progress the plot in alternate directions. In all versions, the game also contains a bad ending in which the player is unable to pursue the other scenarios. This ending serves as the basis of the Another Days scenario in To Heart 2 Another Days, which allows the player to pursue an additional seven heroines.

To Heart 2 X Rated, the Windows version of the visual novel, includes two additional minigames; these minigames do not affect the main plot in any way. In both minigames, the player controls one of the heroines from To Heart 2's storyline, who is made available upon the completion of her scenario in the main portion of the game. The first of the two minigames, titled "Super Sweets Scramble" (スーパースイーツスクランブル, Sūpaa Suiitsu Sukuranburu), is a scrolling shooter in which the player's goal is to progress through a vertically scrolling level, while attacking enemies that resemble confectioneries and dodging their attacks. The second, titled "Dokidoki Panic Library" (ドキドキぱにっくライブラリー, Dokidoki Panikku Raiburarï), is a puzzle game in which the player competes against an opponent for the highest score, by connecting three or more books of the same color and eliminating them from the screen.

== Plot and characters ==
To Heart 2's story revolves around the male protagonist Takaaki Kouno, a high school student who has an aversion to most girls around him, and focuses on his interactions with his schoolmates. The story begins on March 1, 2004, when Takaaki's parents leave for an overseas business trip. That morning, Konomi Yuzuhara, Takaaki's childhood friend, comes to meet Takaaki for their commute to school. Konomi is a cheerful and innocent, but childish girl. She is one year younger than Takaaki, who often views her as a younger sister. The two are also friends with Yuuji Kousaka, who is in the same class as Takaaki. Despite being the son of a wealthy and prestigious family, Yuuji has a frivolous and carefree personality, and often flirts with the girls at school. Takaaki later reunites with Tamaki Kousaka, another childhood friend, who had promised to return before being enrolled into a boarding school. Tamaki has a strong and dominant personality, and tends to act as an elder sister figure to those around her. She later transfers into Takaaki's high school upon the beginning of the new school year.

Throughout the story, Takaaki meets several other heroines attending his school. The first is Manaka Komaki, a timid, clumsy, but accommodating girl who is the vice class representative of Takaaki's class. She often spends time in the school library's storage, and helps the library committee with general tasks. Similar to Takaaki, she is inarticulate around the opposite gender. Manaka is also close friends with Yuma Tonami, an aggressive girl who commutes to school by a mountain bike. Yuma sees Takaaki as a rival after she first met him at school, and often challenges him to various duels. She often laments her grandfather's insistence of having her take over the family business, and attempts to hide her family background from Takaaki. Karin Sasamori is a schoolmate of Takaaki's and the founder of the school's mystery club. Karin has a cheerful and energetic personality, and has an odd affection towards the occult and objects such as egg sandwiches. She first meets Takaaki early in the story, and later deceives him into joining the mystery club.

Sango Himeyuri is an underclassman who takes a liking to Takaaki. She is lively and innocent, but also intelligent. She is in particular proficient in computer-related subjects, and designed multiple humanoid maid robots as an engineer for Kurusugawa Electronics. Ruri Himeyuri is another underclassman of Takaaki and Sango's younger twin sister. In contrast to her older sister, Ruri has a bad-mouthed and hostile personality. She is very protective of Sango, and often regards Takaaki's interactions with her in bad faith. Lucy Maria Misora is a girl whom Takaaki meets one day on his way home. She has a calm personality and opens up to very few people except him. Lucy claims to be an alien, and speaks a unique language she calls the "Rū Language" (るー語, Rūgo). She later attends Takaaki's school under the name Rūko Kireinasora. Yūki Kusakabe is a gentle and well-mannered girl who often lingers in the school building at night. She was one of Takaaki's classmates in elementary school, but has since transferred away because of her parents' divorce.

Two heroines were subsequently added to To Heart 2's story in later versions of the game. Sasara Kusugawa becomes the student council president of Takaaki's school during his second year. She inherits her position from the previous president Ma-ryan, as she is the only remaining student council member after the latter's graduation. Sasara is very diligent, often completing all of the student council's tasks by herself. She is often feared by students for her strict attitude, but is actually disguising a shy and gentle personality. Mio Hanesaki is Takaaki's classmate. She remains largely unnoticed by other students, most of whom remain oblivious of her name. She originally ties her hair up and wears eyeglasses, but later wears contact lens and her hair untied as an attempt by Takaaki to change the impression she gives to others.

== Development ==
To Heart 2's development originally began as a collaborative effort for the PlayStation 2 between the Osaka and Tokyo studios of Aquaplus. During one of the staff meetings for the partnered project, To Heart 2 was conceived when a staff member jokingly mentioned the possibility of a sequel for the original To Heart. Production began shortly after once the team realized the popularity and success of the forerunner. Naoya Shimokawa, the president of Aquaplus, produced the resulting project, and Tsutomu Washimi served as the game's director.

The work on the game's scenario was split between four writers. Shōsuke Miyake drafted the game's overall storyline as well as the scenarios for Sango, Ruri, and Lucy; Nagare Makura wrote the scenarios for Manaka and Yuma; Takeshi Marui for Karin and Yūki; and Munemitsu for Konomi and Tamaki. Likewise, the game's character designs were split amongst four artists. Misato Mitsumi provided the character designs and illustrations for Konomi and Yuma; Hisashi Kawata for Lucy and Karin; Tatsuki Amazuyu for Tamaki and Manaka; and Takeshi Nakamura for Sango, Ruri, and Yūki. The game's music was composed by Shimokawa, Junya Matsuoka, Shinya Ishikawa, Kazue Nakagami, and Michio Kinugasa.

Since the development staff had an equal number of writers as illustrators, it was originally planned to pair each illustrator with a single scenario writer; Mistumi was also to provide designs for the main heroine. Though this would have simplified the project's workload by easing communications among the staff, the idea was scrapped once the staff realized that the final product might merely be a collection of four distinct pieces. Ultimately, writing and design responsibilities were divided based on the staff members' individual preferences. The staff also commented that the development team faced communication difficulties because of the physical distance between the two Aquaplus studios. Early in production, members from both studios gathered in a single location to discuss development, but as production progressed, they began to rely on other methods of communication such as telephone calls and instant messaging. Washimi noted that these methods made it complicated for the writers and illustrators to communicate effectively, and during the development of To Heart 2 X Rated, Miyake took a two-month-long business trip to Osaka to rectify the problem.

Rather than creating a new setting for To Heart 2, the development team chose to roll over various inherent features from the original. The majority of the game is set within the same school and town, but instead focuses on the northern side of town, rather than the southern side, which is the primary setting of To Heart. The story is set two years after To Heart, (Note: Although To Heart and To Heart 2 take place in 1999 and 2004 respectively, the writers stated that the actual time difference is intended to be two years.) and its lack of mobile phones was an attempt to replicate the technological themes of its predecessor. Despite the story's inclusion of maid robots, the writers stated that the story's setting was influenced by the 1990s, during which To Heart took place. As the only artist to return from the original's development team, Kawata was consulted by the other illustrators for character designs. He commented that the other artists attempted to create their designs with respect to the previous work, but he decided otherwise by attempting to "shape a new image" for the designs. The illustrators avoided creating a character with green hair as a heroine, because of the overwhelming impression the character Multi had left them in To Heart. Miyake noted that it was difficult for him to write the scenario for To Heart 2 because the game's development began during the time he was writing December When There Is No Angel, and Ruri and Sango's original scenario had to be rewritten because of their overwhelming resemblance to the latter title.

=== Release history ===
To Heart 2 was first released as an all-ages title for the PlayStation 2 on December 28, 2004 in three versions: a limited edition, a deluxe edition, and a regular edition. The limited edition release contains the game itself, an original soundtrack disc, a visual concept collection, a calendar, and a special casing; the deluxe edition contains the extras included in the limited edition and a version of To Heart playable on the PS2; the regular edition does not contain the aforementioned extras. The original PS2 version was followed by an adult version entitled To Heart 2 X Rated (stylized as ToHeart2 XRATED). It was first released on December 9, 2005 for Microsoft Windows PCs as a limited edition, and was subsequently followed by a regular edition release on December 23. X Rated is the fifth title in the Leaf Visual Novel Series; it contains additional scenarios and introduces a new heroine named Sasara Kusugawa. Its source code was released by Aquaplus under the GNU General Public License on December 22, 2005 along with the source code for Arurū to Asobo!!, Tears to Tiara, and Kusari. This decision was made due to the inclusion of Xvid derived code and was distributed under the same license. The source code for all four games is distributed upon request in CD-R format. A source code mirror is hosted on GitHub.

An all-ages version, titled To Heart 2 Portable, was released for the PlayStation Portable on July 30, 2009. Unlike previous releases, the PSP release allowed viewing the game in both the original 4:3 and widescreen 16:9 aspect ratios. It was released in three versions: "W Pack Limited Edition", "W Pack", and a regular edition. W Pack includes a version of To Heart playable on PSP, while the limited edition also includes figurines of characters Sasara and Ma-ryan. A budget-priced version of Portable was released on April 25, 2013, while a downloadable version for the PlayStation Store followed on May 30. An enhanced re-release for the PlayStation 3, titled To Heart 2 DX Plus, was released on September 22, 2011 in limited and regular editions. DX Plus is a compilation of To Heart 2 and its spin-off To Heart 2 Another Days. It contains new computer graphic illustrations, additional and rewritten scenarios, including a new heroine named Mio Hanesaki, and Motion Portrait graphics rendering. The limited edition release contains a 300-page A4-sized art book named To Heart 2 Perfect Visual Collection (ToHeart2 パーフェクトビジュアルコレクション, ToHeart2 Paafekuto Bijuaru Korekushon), a four-disc soundtrack titled To Heart 2 Complete Soundtrack (ToHeart2 コンプリートサウンドトラック, ToHeart2 Konpuriito Saundotorakku), and the game itself. A budget-priced release and a downloadable version of DX Plus were released on June 26, 2014.

A battle in To Heart 2: Dungeon Travelers depicting the character Harumi. Dungeon Travelers places the characters of To Heart 2 in a fantasy-based setting.

=== Spin-offs ===
To Heart 2 has received multiple spin-off titles since its initial PlayStation 2 release. The first spin-off release is a desk accessory package titled To Heart 2 Desktop Accessory (ToHeart2 デスクトップアクセサリー, ToHeart2 Desukutoppu Akusesarii) and was released by Aquaplus on November 25, 2005 in limited and regular editions. The release is a collection of multiple wallpapers, screensavers, desktop mascots, voice clips, and a typing game titled "Typing in Heart" (たいぴんぐ in ハート, Taipingu in Haato). Its limited edition release contained a binder and a ballpoint pen, both of which are not found in the regular edition release. The second spin-off release is a visual novel titled To Heart 2 Another Days, and was first released as an adult game on February 29, 2008 for Microsoft Windows PCs in limited and regular editions. Another Days' plot takes place in the fall as a continuation of To Heart 2's story, and its main storyline allows the player to pursue seven heroines consisting of both supporting female characters from To Heart 2 and new characters. In addition, Another Days also contains two additional scenarios that extend storylines from the original game. The first additional scenario is based on Manaka's scenario, and features Ikuno as the protagonist, while the second scenario extends Konomi's scenario, and features Tamaki and Konomi as heroines. Another Days' limited edition release was bundled with a soundtrack disc titled To Heart 2 Secret Sound Track, which contained additional music not found in To Heart 2's original soundtrack release. The scenarios of Another Days are also included as part of the PlayStation 3 compilation, To Heart 2 DX Plus.

The third spin-off release is entitled Manaka de Ikuno!! (愛佳でいくの!!), and was released in both limited and regular editions on December 18, 2009 for Microsoft Windows PCs. Manaka de Ikuno!! itself is a collection of four games: a role-playing video game titled "Final Dragon Chronicle: Guilty Requiem" featuring the characters of To Heart 2, an action game titled "Magical Fight!" (まじかる Fight!, Majikaru Faito!), a collectible card game titled "Princess Collection", and a 3D visual novel titled "Mananatsu: Iinchō to Tokubetsu na Ichinichi" (まななつ～委員長と特別な一日～) featuring Manaka as the heroine. Its limited edition release included an illustration book and an original soundtrack disc; the regular edition did not contain the aforementioned extras. An all-ages version of "Final Dragon Chronicle" for the PlayStation Portable, titled To Heart 2: Dungeon Travelers (ToHeart2 ダンジョントラベラーズ, ToHeart2 Danjon Toraberaazu), was released on June 30, 2011. The visual novel also inspired a pachinko slot machine produced by Sammy. The pachinko slot adaptation, named Pachislot To Heart 2, was released to Japanese pachinko parlors in February 2012. A video game recreation of Pachislot for the PS3 was later released by Aquaplus on October 25, 2012. The characters Tamaki, Konomi, Manaka and Sasara appear as playable characters in the 2011 fighting game Aquapazza: Aquaplus Dream Match, while Yuma and Ma-ryan appear as supporting partner characters. The game's characters also appear in their Dungeon Travelers attire as downloadable content playable characters for the PlayStation Vita version of Dungeon Travelers 2: Ōritsu Toshokan to Mamono no Fūin.

== Related media ==
=== Books and publications ===
A 113-page guidebook titled To Heart 2: Master Guide was published by MediaWorks on January 15, 2005. The book contains poster artwork, the 'face patterns' of each character, selected CG scenes and a guide on how to play through each character's scenarios. Voice actress interviews are also included, as well as a brief guide on how to play through each scenario in To Heart. This was followed by another 192-page guidebook for the visual novel titled The Essence of To Heart 2: To Heart 2 Official Guidebook, which was published by Enterbrain on March 4, 2005. The book contains detailed character descriptions, a complete walk through to every heroine in the game, computer graphics, and interviews with the game's development staff. Enterbrain also released a 223-page guidebook entitled The Essence of To Heart 2 Portable: To Heart 2 Portable Official Guidebook for the PlayStation Portable version of the game on August 18, 2009. The guidebook is based on the original Essence for the PlayStation 2 game, but contained new and revised content for the PSP version. A guidebook for the PSP spin-off To Heart 2: Dungeon Travelers, named To Heart 2: Dungeon Travelers Official Complete Guide, was released by Enterbrain on August 11, 2011.

Multiple novels based on the To Heart 2 franchise have also been published by several publishers. A single-volume short story anthology entitled To Heart 2 Short Stories was published by Square Enix under their Game Novels imprint on June 30, 2005. This was followed by three light novels written by Osamu Murata and published by Harvest Novels under their Nagomi Bunko imprint. The first volume, titled To Heart 2 Multiple Choice: Takaaki Kakushigo Bōdō!? (ToHeart2 MultipleChoice ～貴明隠し子騒動！？～; To Heart 2 Multiple Choice: Takaaki's Illegitimate Child Crisis!?), was illustrated by Yōichi Ariko and released on October 5, 2009. The second, titled To Heart 2 Two Pieces: Manaka and Sasara (ToHeart2 TwoPieces ～愛佳とささら～, ToHeart2 TwoPieces: Manaka to Sasara), was illustrated by Ariko and Atsuto Shinozuka and released on June 1, 2010. The third, titled To Heart 2 Two Pieces: Konomi and Tamaki (ToHeart2 TwoPieces ～このみと環～, ToHeart2 TwoPieces: Konomi to Tamaki), was illustrated by Tasuku Iizuki and Sana Wakatsuki and released on July 5, 2010.

Harvest also released a two-volume short story compilation entitled To Heart 2 Tanpenshū (ToHeart2 短編集; To Heart 2 Short Story Collection) and written by Ikkaku Morino, Yūri Nanami, and Tomoyuki Fujinami. The first volume was released on December 5, 2010, while the second was released on June 1, 2011. A single-volume light novel based on the "Final Dragon Chronicle" minigame was again published by Harvest. The novel, titled To Heart 2: Final Dragon Chronicle Sono Go (ToHeart2 ファイナルドラゴンクロニクル・その後, ToHeart2: Fainaru Doragon Kuronikuru Sono Go; To Heart 2: Final Dragon Chronicle Thereafter), was written by Takuya Baba, illustrated by Ushio Komone, and released on February 20, 2011.

=== Manga ===
To Heart 2 has received multiple manga adaptations since its original visual novel release. The first manga series was illustrated by Haruka Ogataya and serialized in the shōnen manga magazine Dengeki Daioh between February 21, 2005 and January 21, 2007. The individual chapters were later compiled into three bound volumes published by MediaWorks between October 22, 2005 and May 26, 2007. The second manga adaptation, titled To Heart 2: Colorful Note, is a retelling of the entire To Heart 2 story. Colorful Note was illustrated by Tsuna Kitaumi and serialized in the shōnen manga magazine Monthly GFantasy between March 18, 2005 and March 18, 2008. It was later collected into five volumes published by Square Enix between October 27, 2005 and April 27, 2009. Another manga, titled To Heart 2 SD: Seitokai Days, was serialized in the manga magazine Manga 4-koma Kings Palette Lite between July 2, 2008 and September 2, 2010 and was illustrated by Natsuki Miyama. It was released as a single bound volume by Ichijinsha on December 22, 2009. A manga adaptation of To Heart 2 Another Days was serialized in ASCII Media Works's Dengeki G's Festival! Comic between July 26, 2008 and August 26, 2010. Another Days was illustrated by Sō, and was collected into two bound volumes released on February 26, 2010 and April 27, 2011.

There are also fifteen sets of manga anthologies produced by different companies and drawn by a multitude of different artists. The first anthology series, titled simply To Heart 2, was published by Square Enix as two volumes on February 18 and May 27, 2005. It was followed by a sixteen-volume anthology series titled To Heart 2 Comic Anthology released by Ichijinsha between February 25, 2005 and June 25, 2007. A two-volume anthology series titled To Heart 2 Anthology Comic was released by Fox Publishing between March 10 and June 25, 2005. The fourth anthology series, titled To Heart 2: 4-koma Manga Gekijō (ToHeart2 ４コママンガ劇場) and published by Square Enix, was released on March 18 and June 30, 2005 in two volumes. A three-volume anthology named Anthology Comic To Heart 2 was released by Ohzora Publishing between March 24 and August 24, 2005 in three volumes. A two-volume anthology series, titled Comic Anthology To Heart 2: Anata ga Koisuru Monogatari (コミックアンソロジー ToHeart2 ～あなたが恋する物語～), was published by Broccoli and distributed by Jive on April 2 and August 1, 2005. A single-volume anthology, again titled To Heart 2 Anthology Comic, was published by Enterbrain under their Magi-Cu Comics imprint on April 25, 2005.

A single-volume manga anthology, again titled simply To Heart 2, was published by Mag Garden under their BC Anthology Collection on May 28, 2005. Another manga anthology series, named To Heart 2 4-koma Kingdom (To Heart2 4コマKINGDOM), was published by Futabasha in two volumes on May 28 and October 29, 2005. Hobby Japan released a single-volume manga anthology, again titled To Heart 2 Anthology Comic, on July 25, 2005. This was followed by a single-volume anthology named Anthology Comics To Heart 2 Heartful 4-koma (アンソロジーコミックスTo Heart2ハートフル4コマ, Ansorojii Komikkusu To Heart 2 Haatofuru 4-koma) and published by Ohzora on September 24, 2005. The twelfth anthology released was a three-volume series titled To Heart 2: Special Days Comic Anthology and published by Ichijinsha between May 24 and July 25, 2008. A single-volume anthology titled Magi-Cu 4-koma To Heart 2 (マジキュー4コマ ToHeart2, Majikyū 4-koma ToHeart2) was published by Enterbrain on June 25, 2008. Another single-volume anthology titled To Heart 2: After School Diary 4-koma Maximum and published by Bunendo followed its release on August 11, 2008. The last manga anthology series, titled To Heart 2 Anthology Comic: Precious Days, was released by Capcom on December 10, 2008 and February 20, 2009 as two volumes.

=== Anime ===
An anime television adaptation of To Heart 2 was produced by OLM's Team Iguchi, directed by Norihiko Sudō, and was scripted by head writer Hiroshi Yamaguchi. Both members had previously served the same positions for the studio's Comic Party anime adaptation, and Yamaguchi was also the main writer for the To Heart anime. The anime series, containing fourteen episodes, was first broadcast in Japan between October 3, 2005 and January 2, 2006 on Television Kanagawa as a UHF anime. Out of the fourteen episodes, thirteen were regular episodes, while a summary episode also aired after the eleventh episode. Inspired by the film Mystery Train, Sudō and the production staff created the series' story as a nonlinear narrative; each episode of the anime follows a different heroine's interactions with the protagonist over the same span of time. The anime series was released in Japan as seven separate DVD volumes between December 22, 2005 and June 23, 2006 by Imagica. A DVD box set containing the series was released on September 10, 2008. Maiden Japan have licensed the series for a North American release.

There have also been five sets of original video animation series produced by Chaos Project and Aquaplus. Of the five OVA series, Yasuhisa Katō directed the first two sets of episodes, while Jun'ichi Sakata replaced him for the remaining episodes. The first OVA series, containing three episodes, were released by Imagica as three DVD volumes between February 28 and September 28, 2007. The second set of two OVA episodes, titled To Heart 2 AD, was released by Frontier Works as two DVD volumes between March 26 and August 8, 2008. The third set of two episodes, titled To Heart 2 AD Plus, followed as two DVD volumes between April 24 and October 7, 2009. The fourth set of two episodes, titled To Heart 2 AD Next, was released as two volumes in Blu-ray Disc and DVD formats on September 23 and December 22, 2010. The fifth set of two episodes, titled To Heart 2: Dungeon Travelers, was released as two volumes in BD and DVD formats on February 22 and July 25, 2012. To commemorate the visual novel's tenth anniversary, a BD box set collecting all eleven episodes on two discs was released on December 3, 2014.

=== Internet radio shows ===
There have been three Internet radio talk shows pertaining to To Heart 2. The first radio show was titled Radio To Heart 2, and was hosted by Yurika Ochiai and Shizuka Itō, who voiced Konomi and Tamaki respectively in the visual novel. After the show's initial run on the Japanese Internet radio network Onsen ended on March 30, 2006 with its twenty-fifth episode, it began its renewed broadcast on Radio Kansai and the Animate.tv website in April 2006, and continued to broadcast until its 116th episode on January 17, 2008. Seven CD compilations, each containing thirteen of the show's renewed episodes and an extra recording, were released between November 25, 2006 and December 26, 2008. It was followed by a second radio show, titled Sasara, Ma-ryan no Seitokai Kaichō Rajio for To Heart 2 (ささら・まーりゃんの生徒会会長ラジオ for ToHeart2; Sasara and Ma-ryan's Student Council President Radio for To Heart 2). The show is hosted by Ryōko Ono and Ema Kogure, who voiced Sasara and Ma-ryan respectively, and began streaming on Onsen on February 15, 2008. Eleven CD compilations, each containing thirteen episodes and an extra recording, have been released since December 26, 2008, with the latest volume having been released on September 30, 2011.

The third Internet radio show, titled Kurusugawa Jūkō Purezentsu Meidorobo 3 Shimai Rajio Hajimemashita (来栖川重工プレゼンツ メイドロボ３姉妹 ラジオはじめました; Kurusugawa Industries Presents: Maid Robot Sisters Began A Radio Show), was hosted by Emiko Hagiwara, Kotomi Yamakawa, and Harumi Sakurai, who voiced Ilfa, Harumi, and Silfa respectively. The radio show was streamed on Animate.tv between September 7, 2009 and April 5, 2010, and lasted thirty episodes. The episodes were compiled into three CD volumes, each containing ten episodes and an extra recording. The first CD volume was first sold at the Aquaplus Festa 2009 and Comiket 77 events in December 2009, before receiving a public release on January 29, 2010, while the third volume was first sold at Comiket 78 in August 2010, and later on September 23, 2009 as a public release.

=== Music and audio CDs ===
Three pieces of theme music are used in the original To Heart 2 visual novel. "Heart to Heart", the opening theme, was performed by Arisa Nakayama and composed by Kazue Nakagami. "Arigatō" (ありがとう; "Thank You"), the ending theme, was performed by Akko and composed by Naoya Shimokawa. Both songs' lyrics were written by Shōko Sudani. An insert song, "Hoshi no Uta" (星の歌; "Star's Song"), is also used in Yūki's storyline. The song was performed by Rina Satō, who voiced Yūki in the visual novel, and composed and written by Takeshi Marui. The first music CD published for the game was the original soundtrack album. The soundtrack's release preceded that of the visual novel's on December 22, 2004, and the two-disc album contains thirty-eight tracks collected from the background music and theme songs used in the game. A separate soundtrack album containing thirty-three tracks was also packaged with the game's limited and deluxe edition releases. This was then followed by an album titled Heart to Heart by Nakayama on June 22, 2005, which contains the opening theme and songs from other Leaf video games.

An image song album, titled To Heart 2 Character Songs, was released on November 23, 2005 containing nine songs sung by the voice actresses who voiced the heroines found in To Heart 2. A second soundtrack album containing additional music from To Heart 2 Another Days, titled To Heart 2 Secret Sound Track, was bundled with the limited edition release on February 29, 2008. A maxi-single, titled "Cosmos no Yō ni" (コスモスのように, Kosumosu no Yō ni), was then published on March 26, 2008 featuring the titular ending theme for Another Days by Rena Uehara. It was followed by a second image song album, titled To Heart 2 Character Songs Vol. 2, on December 25, 2008 featuring eight songs based on the additional heroines found in the later games. A third soundtrack album, titled To Heart 2 Complete Soundtrack, was bundled with the limited edition of the PlayStation 3 game, To Heart 2 DX Plus, on September 22, 2011. The soundtrack consists of four discs of music compiled from the background music and songs used throughout the series.

Several drama CDs based on To Heart 2 have also been produced. The first set, titled Anthology Drama CD To Heart 2, was released as two volumes between February 24 and March 24, 2006. Two drama CD volumes based on To Heart 2 and Another Days were also released as part of the Aquaplus Himekuri CD (アクアプラス 日めくりCD; Aquaplus Daily CD) series. The second volume of the Himekuri CD series, based on To Heart 2, was released on December 5, 2007, while the fourth volume, based on Another Days, was released on June 4, 2008.

== Reception ==
According to a weekly sales ranking conducted by Media Create, the original version of To Heart 2 was the fourth best-selling video game for the week ending on January 2, 2005, during which the game sold 86,485 copies. Another ranking conducted during the same week by Famitsu.com instead placed this number at 82,949 copies sold. The game subsequently remained on Media Create's sales ranking at thirty-fourth, forty-seventh, and fiftieth until the week ending on January 23, 2005. In a sales ranking of bishōjo games conducted by PCNews, To Heart 2 X Rated's limited edition premiered at first place in the rankings. It subsequently ranked third, thirty-sixth, sixteenth, and twice at thirty-second, before making its last appearance on the chart at fiftieth place in late March 2006. To Heart 2 Portable, the PSP version, was the ninth best-selling video game and sold 32,521 copies between July 27 and August 2, 2009. To Heart 2 DX Plus, the PS3 compilation, placed eighth in sales and sold 24,429 copies in Japan between September 19 and 25, 2011.

Sales surveys conducted by PCpress indicate that To Heart 2 Another Days was the most pre-ordered bishōjo game in Japan between mid-October 2007 and mid-January 2008. It also ranked first as the most widely sold bishōjo game in Japan in February 2008, and was the fifth most widely sold in March 2008. Manaka de Ikuno!! ranked second in bishōjo game pre-orders in Japan between mid-September and mid-October 2009, and it ranked third between mid-October and mid-November 2009. Its limited and regular edition releases placed second and forty-second respectively in the sales rankings in January 2010, while the two releases collectively ranked thirty-third and fiftieth in the two following months. The PSP spin-off To Heart 2: Dungeon Travelers was the third best-selling video game and sold 37,396 copies in Japan between June 27 and July 3, 2011.

In the October 2007 issue of Dengeki G's Magazine, poll results for the fifty best bishōjo games were released. Out of 249 titles, To Heart 2 ranked third with seventy-four votes. Getchu.com hosts an annual voting poll called the "Getchu.com Bishōjo Game Ranking" where users vote online for the best games of the previous year in several different categories. For the 2005 ranking, the categories were: overall, scenario, music, visuals, gameplay system, and heroines. Among the rankings conducted in early 2006, To Heart 2 X Rated placed sixth overall, eighth in scenario, seventh in music, fourth in visuals, and ninth in gameplay system. Two heroines from the game, Sasara and Manaka, ranked as the seventh and ninth most popular heroines respectively.
