= Tears to Tiara =

Japanese adult video game and franchise

- Cover art of Windows release

ティアーズ・トゥ・ティアラ (Tiāzu tu Tiara)
- Genre: Fantasy, Romance, Harem
- Video game
- Developer: Leaf (Windows); Aquaplus (PS3/PSP)
- Publisher: Aquaplus
- Genre: Tactical role-playing game Visual novel Eroge (Windows)
- Platform: Windows (Original); PlayStation 3 (Garland of the Earth); PlayStation Portable (Garland of the Earth)
- Released: Windows: JP: April 28, 2005; Garland of the Earth; PlayStation 3: JP: July 17, 2008; PlayStation Portable: JP: November 25, 2010
- Manga
- Written by: Shirometsukusa
- Published by: Media Factory
- Magazine: Monthly Comic Alive
- Original run: February 27, 2009 – 2010
- Volumes: 3
- Anime television series
- Directed by: Tomoki Kobayashi
- Written by: Tōko Machida
- Music by: Takayuki Hattori
- Studio: White Fox
- Licensed by: NA: Sentai Filmworks
- Original network: Chiba TV, Kids Station, TV Kanagawa, TV Osaka, TV Saitama
- English network: NA: Anime Network; PH: Yey!; SEA: Animax Asia
- Original run: April 6, 2009 – September 28, 2009
- Episodes: 26
- Video game

Tears to Tiara Anecdotes: The Secret of Avalon
- Developer: Aquaplus
- Publisher: Aquaplus
- Genre: Tactical role-playing game Visual novel
- Platform: PlayStation 3 PlayStation Portable
- Released: PlayStation 3: JP: September 17, 2009; PlayStation Portable: JP: December 16, 2010
- Video game

Tears to Tiara II: Heir of the Overlord
- Developer: Aquaplus
- Publisher: JP: Aquaplus; NA: Atlus; EU: NIS America
- Genre: Tactical role-playing game Visual novel
- Platform: PlayStation 3
- Released: JP: October 31, 2013; NA: October 14, 2014; EU: November 11, 2014

Tears to Tiara (ティアーズ・トゥ・ティアラ, Tiāzu tu Tiara) is a Japanese adult tactical role-playing game developed by Leaf. It was first released for Windows on April 28, 2005, in Japan. Then it was followed by a 12-years-old-and-up version called Tears to Tiara: Garland of the Earth (ティアーズ・トゥ・ティアラ -花冠の大地-, Tiāzu tu Tiara: Kakan no Daichi) released for the PlayStation 3 platform on July 17, 2008 in Japan, Hong Kong, and Taiwan in which the adult content was removed. This port also contained several enhancements and additional scenarios including new character designs and changed the original 2D gameplay to 3D.

A side story for the PlayStation 3 port titled Tears to Tiara Anecdotes: The Secret of Avalon (ティアーズ・トゥ・ティアラ外伝 アヴァロンの謎, Tiāzu tu Tiara Gaiden: Avaron no Nazo) was released on September 17, 2009 and a sequel titled Tears to Tiara II: Heir of the Overlord (ティアーズ・トゥ・ティアラII 覇王の末裔, Tiāzu tu Tiara II: Haō no Matsuei) was released on October 31, 2013.

== Plot ==
The game draws heavily from Welsh, Celt, Christian and Roman mythology, with characters named Arawn, Arthur, Epona, Llŷr, Morgan, Pwyll, Rhiannon, and Taliesin. Set in a Late Antiquity–inspired fantasy setting, story starts on an island, Erin (or Hibernia, as shown on an in-game map), on the west border of the Holy Empire.

The prologue is centered around the precognition-gifted priestess of the Gael tribe, Rhiannon. She is kidnapped by a rogue priest of the Holy Empire, Drwc, to be used as a sacrifice in a ritual meant to resurrect the Demon King Arawn and put Drwc in his favor. As a response the Gael people burn their village and swear to bring Rhiannon back or exact revenge on the Empire. In the middle of the ritual, as the Gael people attack Drwc's soldiers, Arawn is resurrected and offered Rhiannon. At this point, he kills Drwc, frees Rhiannon, and proclaims no intention of wreaking the havoc which the legends attributed to him. Instead, he shows interest in Rhinannon's brother Arthur, the First Warrior of his tribe. Rhiannon, on the other hand, falls in love with Arawn, and by declaring her decision to marry him, makes him the chieftain of the Gael tribe (her and Arthur's father was the previous chieftain, but Arthur could not assume the title due to being the First Warrior).

As the prologue ends, the point of view is switched from Rhiannon to Arawn, revealing him to be the protagonist of the game, and the story continues with the exodus of Gael tribe to the neighboring island of Albion (or Insula Britannica, as shown on an in-game map) in hope of eluding the Empire.

== Media ==
=== Games ===
Tears to Tiara was first released as an adult game on April 28, 2005, by Aquaplus’ adult game division Leaf for the Windows platform. Its opening theme is Tears to Tiara by Arisa Nakayama, insert song (Tears to Tiara -凱歌) by D-Terada while the ending theme is "Until", also by Arisa Nakayama.

Riannon and Arawn in the PlayStation 3 port.

The title was later remade and released as a B rated game, titled Tears to Tiara: Garland of the Earth (ティアーズ・トゥ・ティアラ -花冠の大地-, Tiāzu tu Tiara: Kakan no Daichi) for the PlayStation 3 on July 17, 2008, with two different editions, a limited edition and a regular edition. It has additional scenarios, 3D gameplay and the change of character designs if compared to the Windows version. The limited edition of the release contains a booklet titled as Tears to Tiara - Visual Works that features the character designs and storyboards as well as the game's original soundtrack. There was also a pre-order campaign that also includes special extras for the game such as a sticker poster set and a character voice CD that contains system voice and Tears to Tiara Radio Vol.0 (ティアーズ・トゥ・ティアラ ラジオ Vol.0, Tiāzu tu Tiara Rajio Vol.0) that features Tōru Ōkawa, Yūko Gotō and Makoto Ishii. The game also has a new character, Lidia, voiced by Miyuki Sawashiro. The titles of the opening and ending theme are "haunting melody" and "memory", both sung by Suara. An insert titled "Until" sung by Rena Uehara was also used.

Furthermore, it was first announced in the staff blog that there will also be a side story game for the PlayStation 3 port, titled Tears to Tiara Anecdotes: The Secret of Avalon (ティアーズ・トゥ・ティアラ外伝 -アヴァロンの謎-, Tiāzu tu Tiara Gaiden: Abaron no Nazo). The Secret of Avalon also has a new character called Decimus, voiced by Wataru Hatano. Tears to Tiara Anecdotes was released on September 17, 2009, and like the enhanced port, it is for the PlayStation 3 platform. The release is in two editions, a limited edition and a regular edition. Both the enhanced port and Anecdotes were also ported for PlayStation Portable.

Characters from Tears to Tiara are also playable in Aquapazza: Aquaplus Dream Match, a fighting game developed by Aquaplus with characters from various Leaf games.

==== Gameplay ====
The gameplay between the two versions are very different. The Windows game has the combat segments occurring in real-time while the PlayStation 3 version has been altered it to be turn based combat. In any of its version, the player and enemy AI control multiple characters of different classes such as magic user, archer, and soldier. Outside of battle the story is told through 2-D cutscenes, with gameplay proceeding much like a typical visual novel.

=== Manga ===
A manga adaptation of the PlayStation 3 port was serialized in Media Factory's monthly seinen manga magazine, Monthly Comic Alive in 2009 and 2010. This adaptation was done by Shirometsukusa, who had previously done a part in Fate/stay night's manga anthology. It has started its serialization in the magazine's 2nd issue in 2009. The first volume has been released on June 23, 2009, under Media Factory's MF Comics Alive Series label as well as bearing the number ISBN 978-4-8401-2581-9.

=== Anime ===
An anime adaptation aired based also on the PlayStation 3 port. The anime is directed by Tomoki Kobayashi and its series composition done by Tōko Machida. The animation is done by White Fox and T3Works is the series' production committee.

The series began airing on April 6, 2009, incorporating the additional scenario and characters in the PlayStation 3 release. In addition to its Japanese premiere, the anime has been simulcast and received its English language premiere on Animax Asia on the same day at 12:35 am across its networks on Southeast Asia, the same time the series will receive its Japanese premiere at 01:35 am Japanese Standard Time. This would be the fastest premiere of an anime outside Japan. On March 20, 2009, it was further confirmed that the series would indeed be simulcast with Japanese audio and English subtitles with Malay subtitles for Malaysia; being the first of its kind.

The anime uses the same voice actors from the PlayStation 3 game, with Tōru Ōkawa, Yūko Gotō and Makoto Ishii voicing Arawn, Riannon and Arthur respectively. The series' opening and ending theme are "Free and Dream" and "True Sky, Blue Sky" which are sung by Suara and Aira Yūki respectively. Both singles were released on April 22, 2009, by King Records and Bandai Visual respectively. While there was also an insert song titled "Until", used in episode 17. It was sung by Rena Uehara. An original soundtrack for the series done by Takayuki Hattori was released on June 24, 2009. It mainly contains background music along with the TV size ending theme. The CD bears the catalog number LACA-5925.

The first volume of both DVD and Blu-ray went on sale on June 17, 2009, and subsequent volumes will be released every month by Pony Canyon. The first volume's cover features Arawn and Riannon while the second features Arthur and Morgan. Both first and second volumes of the limited edition includes a 20-page full-color booklet as well as having a sticker poster and a one piece type casing. The first volume also feature separate interviews with Tomoki Kobayashi, Tōru Ōkawa and Tōko Machida.

The anime has been picked up for release in North America by Sentai Filmworks, distributed by the new company, Section23 Films. Part 1 of the series was released on November 24, 2009. Part 2 was then released on January 26, 2010. Sentai Filmworks re-released Tears to Tiara with an English dub in 2010. Sentai Filmworks and Section23 Films released Tears to Tiara on DVD and Blu-ray with the English dub on October 19, 2010.

=== Internet radio ===
There was an Internet radio broadcast before the start of the current radio and the title for the radio changes for every episode. There were a total of 8 episodes before it was renewed to the current title, Shin Tiāzu tu Tiarajio (真・ティアーズ・トゥ・ティアラジオ; Shin Tears to Tiaradio). There were no guests for all the 8 episodes except for a public recording on February 14, 2009, at One Hobby 9. Before Shin Tears to Tiaradio began, the untitled internet radio started broadcasting on November 29, 2008, at the official site and later started broadcasting with a fixed title on April 13, 2009. New episodes will be broadcast on every Friday at Nico Nico Anime Channel. It has also started broadcasting in Onsen every Monday.

The personalities for the show are Riannon and Arthur's voice actors, Yūko Gotō and Makoto Ishii. Guests for Shin Tears to Tiaradio are Tōru Ōkawa for episode 3 and 4, Ami Koshimizu and Ai Shimizu for episode 5 and 6, Kaori Nazuka for episode 7 and 8, Suara for episode 9, Ryōko Ono and Ema Kogure from the To Heart series for episode 10 while Kiyomi Asai for episode 11 and 12.

Here are the following episode titles for the previous radio broadcast before Shin Tears to Tiaradio:

Episode #	Broadcast date	Title
0	November 29, 2008	TiaTia Station (ティアティアステーション（仮）, TiaTia Sutēshon)
1	December 22, 2008	(ティアーズ・トゥ・ティアラ〜ゆうことまことの冠番組〜)
2	January 12, 2009	(ティアーズ・トゥ・ティアラ〜ゆうことまことの仁義なき兄弟!?〜)
3	January 26, 2009	Tears to Tiara Yūko and Makoto’s Dangerous Radio (ティアーズ・トゥ・ティアラ ゆうことまことの危ないラジオ!, Tiāzu tu Tiara Yūko to Makoto no Abunai Rajio!)
4	February 9, 2009	(ティアーズ・トゥ・ティアラ ゆうことまことの往生せいや!（お嬢だけに）)
5	February 23, 2009	(ティアーズ・トゥ・ティアラ ゆうことまことの胸キュンラジオ〜マブイお嬢とハクいまこつ〜)
6	March 9, 2009	(ティアーズ・トゥ・ティアラ ゆうことまことの壊れかけのラジオ)
7	March 27, 2009	(ティアーズ・トゥ・ティアラ ゆうことまことの俺たちゲール族)

== Merchandise ==
There were PVC figures of Riannon, Octavia and Ermin made by Kotobukiya for Tears to Tiara: Garland of the Earth. Furthermore, it was first announced at the official site that there was a Nendoroid figure for Riannon and Arawn being made by Good Smile Company. The Riannon figure is to be released in August 2009, while Arawn is released one month after. It was announced in the staff blog that they are now available for pre-orders. Both are priced at 3,500 yen each. Kazuyoshi Udono sculpted Riannon's figure. While Arawn's figure is sculpted by Reiichi Itō, both with sculpting assistance provided by Nendoron.

There is also a trading card game of the anime in the works. The title of the card game has yet to be announced.

== Sequel ==
A sequel, titled Tears to Tiara II: Heir of the Overlord (ティアーズ・トゥ・ティアラII 覇王の末裔, Tiāzu tu Tiara II: Haō no Matsuei), was announced by Aquaplus in January 2011 for the PlayStation 3. It is set in the same world as its predecessor, but features new main characters designed by dōjinshi artist Tatami Honjō. It was released on October 31, 2013. Atlus USA released Tears to Tiara II in the west in fall 2014.

== Source code release ==
Tears to Tiara was one of four games (along with Aruruu to Asobo!!, Kusari, and ToHeart2 XRATED) for which Leaf was forced to release the source code to the public due to having used the Xvid video codec in the game. Xvid is licensed under the GNU Public License, which requires that programs using the codec to make their source code available to program users. A source code repository is hosted on GitHub.
