= Madoka Yonezawa =

Japanese voice actress and singer

- 米澤 円
- Born: August 30, 1982 (age 44); Osaka Prefecture, Japan
- Other name: En-chan
- Occupations: Voice actress; singer
- Years active: 2005–present
- Agent: 81 Produce
- Notable work: Shirobako as Sara Satou, Ayano Makise; K-On! as Ui Hirasawa; White Album 2 as Setsuna Ogiso
- Height: 160 cm (5 ft 3 in)
- Children: 2

Madoka Yonezawa (米澤 円, Yonezawa Madoka; born August 30, 1982) is a Japanese voice actress and singer from Osaka Prefecture.

== Personal life ==
On 30 August 2017, she announced her marriage and first baby. In 2020, she announced her second baby.

== Filmography ==
=== Television animation ===
Year	Title	Role	Note	Source
2005	Shuffle!	Schoolgirl A		
2005	Major First Season	Classmate		
2005	Major Second Season	Student		
2006	Shiroi Koibito	Kai		
2006	MegaMan NT Warrior BEAST+	High school girl B, Child		
2007	Ah! My Goddess: Fighting Wings	Valkyrie		
2007	Over Drive	Student		
2007	Kirarin Revolution	Girl		
2007	Gin Tama	Woman		
2007	Sumomomo Momomo	Girl A		
2007	Zero Duel Masters	Duellist		
2007	D.Gray-man	Lady B		
2007	Hatara Kizzu Maihamu Gumi	Memi		
2007	Love Com	Akechin, Student		
2007	Mega Man Star Force	Child		
2008	Gin Tama	Woman A, Ginko		
2008	Monochrome Factor	Woman		
2009	Umineko no Naku Koro ni	Leviathan		
2009	K-On!	Ui Hirasawa		
2009	Gokujō!! Mecha Mote Iinchō	Kaho Harui		
2009	The Sacred Blacksmith	Chairperson		
2010	Betrayal Knows My Name	Ai, Schoolgirl A		
2010	Maid Sama!	Woman customer		
2010	K-On!!	Ui Hirasawa		
2010	Strike Witches 2	Maria		
2010	Nodame Cantabile: Finale	Mika		
2010	Pokémon: Diamond and Pearl	Urara's Minun		
2010	Ladies versus Butlers!	Schoolgirl		
2011	Gin Tama	Sachiko		
2011	Pretty Rhythm: Aurora Dream	Serena Jōnouchi		
2012	Another	Izumi Akazawa		
2012	Daily Lives of High School Boys	Yukana		
2012	Pretty Rhythm: Dear My Future	Jae-eun		
2012	Seitokai no Ichizon Lv.2	Ringo Sugisaki		
2013	RDG Red Data Girl	Mayura Sōda		
2013	Stella Women's Academy, High School Division Class C3	Yachiyo Hinata		
2013	Genshiken 2	Kumiko Yabusaki		
2013	White Album 2	Setsuna Ogiso		
2014	A Good Librarian Like a Good Shepherd	Tsugumi Shirasaki		
2014	Girl Friend Beta	Hina Nigaki		
2015	Shirobako	Sara Satou, Ayano Makise, Christine Waldegård		
2015	Magical Girl Lyrical Nanoha ViVid	Olivie Sägebrecht		
2016	Aokana: Four Rhythm Across the Blue	Rika Ichinose		
2017	In Another World With My Smartphone	Cecile		
2019	Star Twinkle PreCure	Leo's Star Princess		
2019	The Case Files of Lord El-Melloi II: Rail Zeppelin Grace Note	Olga Marie Animusphere		
2021	Muteking the Dancing Hero	An		
2023	The 100 Girlfriends Who Really, Really, Really, Really, Really Love You	Shiori Yoshimoto		

=== Original video animation (OVA) ===
- Isekai no Seikishi Monogatari, Lashara Earth XXVIII
- Gift: Eternal Rainbow, Companion
- T.P.Sakura: Time Paladin Sakura, Moe Mizukoshi
- Futari Ecchi, Waitress B
- Shirobako, Christine Waldegård

=== Films ===
- Pokémon: Arceus and the Jewel of Life (2009), Nidoran♀
- K-On! the Movie (2011), Ui Hirasawa
- Girls und Panzer der Film (2015), Tamaki Tamada
- Fate/Grand Order: First Order (2016), Olga Marie Animusphere
- Girls und Panzer das Finale (2017), Flint

=== Video games ===
She is also known by her alias Mishiro Mako (三代眞子).

- Genkai Tokki: Seven Pirates, Sakyura
- K-On! Hōkago Live!!, Ui Hirasawa
- Touhou Genso Wanderer, Sanae Kochiya
- Granblue Fantasy, Ferry
- Arknights, Proviso
- White Album 2, Setsuna Ogiso
- Dragalia Lost, Odetta
- Fate/Grand Order, U-Olga Marie
- Granblue Fantasy: Relink, Ferry

== Discography ==
- 2012, Responsibility Response
