= Kusari =

2005 video game

- Developer: Leaf
- Publisher: Aquaplus
- Designers: Makura Nagare (Scenario); Pimeko & Tometa (QP:flapper) (Characters)
- Platform: Windows
- Release: September 22, 2005
- Genres: Visual novel, Eroge
- Mode: Single player

Kusari (鎖; lit. Chains) is an eroge visual novel by Leaf. It is a suspenseful adventure game dealing with psychological warfare as players are pitted against a cunning and powerful criminal while trapped in the open sea on a cruise ship.

Although this game produced Leaf, much of the staff for this game was outsourced. This was because the game was outside of the fantasy or true love scenario games that have become the company's backbone. Instead, the game had twisted dark scenarios.

As the game's story progresses, gameplay revolves around the player making the correct selections and collecting items. If the wrong selections are made or an item is missed, the story will eventually conclude abruptly with death and game over. The goal is to kill the criminal on board, which may happen in one of 9 different endings in the game. These multiple endings range greatly, from a happy ending to twisted, bad endings.

== Story ==
The stage of this tale is set inside the high-speed experimental ship Basilisk. Kyosuke Koduki, the game's protagonist, is invited on the ship's maiden test voyage as a guest by his friend's mother. When the ship finds castaway Yoichi Kishida, things go horribly wrong for the voyage.

== Characters ==
Kyōsuke Kōzuki (香月 恭介, Kōzuki Kyōsuke)
The male protagonist of the game. A high school student who has lost his father at a young age. The tender-hearted elder brother of Chihaya, and a reliable guy among his friends. CV:Daisuke Ono
Akeno Orihara (折原 明乃, Orihara Akeno)
A long-time childhood friend of Kyosuke, and daughter of Shino. A gentle girl with strong convictions. CV:Ryōko Ono
Megumi Katagiri (片桐 恵, Katagiri Megumi)
A reserved and precocious girl. Because she tries hard not to display her feelings, she is hard to read. CV:Yuria Hokuto
Karen Ayanobe (綾之部 可憐, Ayanobe Karen)
The eldest daughter of a noble family and sister of Tamami. A brash elitist with a large ego. CV:Yuka Tanaka
Tamami Ayanobe (綾之部 珠美, Ayanobe Tamami)
The younger sister of Karen, although she is only one year younger than her sister, she looks and acts many years younger. Despite her immaturity and propensity to play pranks, she is quite clever at MacGyver-ing items. CV:Asuka Tanii
Chihaya Kōzuki (香月 ちはや, Kōzuki Chihaya)
Kyosuke's younger sister. Although constitutionally weak, she is a very strong-willed girl because of the loss of her father at a young age. Highly attached to her brother. CV:Ryu Ueto
Tomonori Hayama (早間 友則, Hayama Tomonori)
Kyosuke's best friend by circumstance of sharing the same interests. He is a very vain and patronizing person who is very self-centered.
Shino Orihara (折原 志乃, Orihara Shino)
Mother of Akeno, and the chief person in charge of the "BaShiRiSuKu" voyage. She is the one who invites everyone on the ship's maiden test voyage. A very accepting and generous woman. CV:Kaoru Shinomiya
Yōichi Kishida (岸田 洋一, Kishida Yōichi)
A man found adrift at sea. Claiming to be a marine researcher, he boards the ship and murders the ship's crew. A fearsome person skilled at psychological manipulation and terror tactics. CV:Kenji Hamada

== Release and sales ==
Kusari was the fifth top-selling computer game on getchu.com for the month of its release,, and it was the 44th top-selling eroge for 2005. Although these are very good sales overall, they pale in comparison to many of Leaf's other titles, most notably against Leaf's To Heart 2 XRATED which ranked #1 in the same year.

== Source code release ==
Kusari was one of four games (Aruruu to Asobo!!, Tears to Tiara, Kusari and ToHeart2 XRATED) Leaf was forced to release its source code to the public due to having used the Xvid video codec in the game without complying to the software's license. XVid is licensed under the GNU Public license, which requires that programs using the codec make their source code available to program users. A source code mirror is hosted on a GitHub repository.
