= Leaf (Japanese company) =

Japanese visual novel studio

- Type: Brand of Aquaplus
- Industry: Computer games
- Genre: Eroge & visual novels
- Founded: Osaka, Japan (1995; 31 years ago)
- Headquarters: Yodogawa-ku, Osaka, Japan
- Area served: Japan
- Key people: Naoya Shimokawa
- Products: To Heart; White Album; Utawarerumono; To Heart 2; White Album 2
- Website: leaf.aquaplus.jp

Leaf is a Japanese visual novel studio under the publisher Aquaplus, and has offices in Yodogawa-ku, Osaka, and Tokyo. It and its competitor Key (to which it is often compared) are two of the most popular and successful dedicated visual novel studios operating today. It was launched out of obscurity by its early release To Heart. Leaf used the XviD video codec in several games: Aruru to Asobo!!, Tears to Tiara, Kusari, and ToHeart2 X Rated. Since XviD is free software, released under the GPL, Leaf was obligated to release the source code to those games under the same license. One still requires the game data to actually play the games with the source code. In addition, a free software game engine, named xlvns, was developed soon after Leaf released its first three visual novels. Characters from Utawarerumono, Tears to Tiara, To Heart, and Kizuato are playable in Aquapazza: Aquaplus Dream Match, a fighting game developed by Aquaplus featuring characters from various Leaf games.

== History ==
In October 1994, the video game development group that would become Leaf was established in the Kansai region of Japan as U-Office. The core members who launched Leaf were friends who met in high school such as Naoya Shimokawa and Shinji Orito who bonded over computers and music, specifically desktop music (DTM). One of Leaf's founders was Shimokawa, who wanted to work in video games to work on their music scores. In the early days of Leaf, they team members would provide music for other companies' software under the U-Office name. Orito, who then had quit his job in programming for a banking company, joined U-Office on an invite from Shimokawa.

Leaf would initially make bishōjo games, which included a number of strip mahjong video games such as debut title DR^{2}Naito Suzume Oni (Note: DR^{2}ナイト雀鬼s; lit. 'DR^{2} Naito Suzume Oni') in February 1995. Shimokawa said the company made bishōjo games as consoles games were not within their budgets and PC eroge titles were what he described as in a blurry field where the difference between a mainstream game and doujin title was not obvious. They would also make both an adult-themed and general audience-themed Japanese role-playing games with Filsnown (1995) and Legam respectively. During this time in development, Shimokawa said that the Leaf was struggling financially. Orito would leave Leaf after Shizuku, as he had a lot of insurance-related bills that he could not handle while working for Leaf.

== Titles ==
- DR^{2}Naito Suzume Oni (1995)
- Filsnown (1995)
- Leaf Visual Novel Series (LVNS)
  - Shizuku (1996)
  - Kizuato (1996)
  - To Heart (1997)
  - Routes (2003)
- White Album (1998)
- Comic Party (1999)
- Magical Antique (2000)
- Tasogare (2001)
- Abyss Boat (2002)
- Utawarerumono (2002)
- December When There Is No Angel (2003)
- Tears to Tiara (2005)
- Kusari (2005)
- To Heart 2 XRATED (2005)
- FullAni (2006)
- To Heart 2: Another Days (2008)
- Kimi ga Yobu, Megido no Oka de (2008)
- White Album 2: Introductory Chapter (2010)
- Hoshi no Ouji-kun (2011)
- White Album 2: Closing Chapter (2011)
- Tears to Tiara II: Haou no Matsuei (2013)
- Utawarerumono: Itsuwari no Kamen (2015)

=== Leaf amusement softs ===
- Saorin to Issho!! (1996)
- Hatsune no Naisho!! (1997)
- Inagawa de Ikou!! (2000)
- Aruru to Asobo!! (2004)
- Manaka de Ikuno!! (2009)
