= Rena Uehara =

Female Japanese singer-songwriter

- Born: August 12, 1986 (age 40); Hyogo, Japan
- Occupation: singer-songwriter

Rena Uehara (上原 れな, Uehara Rena; born August 12, 1986) is a female Japanese singer-songwriter originally from Hyogo, Japan and now residing in Osaka. She is known for performing theme songs for OVAs of Utawarerumono and To Heart 2. She has also done the opening for White Album 2, Todokanai Koi '13. On December 28, 2015, she had announced that she will go hiatus to treat her voice because she was diagnosed with psychogenic disphonia.

== Discography ==
=== Singles ===
- Niji no Kakehashi (虹の架け橋), released March 26, 2008
- Cosmos no You ni (コスモスのように), released March 26, 2008
- Yume no Tsuzuki (夢のつづき), released June 24, 2009
- Tokimeki (トキメキ), released September 22, 2010
- Todokanai Koi '13 (届かない恋 '13), released November 6, 2013

=== Albums ===
- to You, released August 6, 2008
- Jewelry Song, released November 6, 2009
- l'espoir, released February 22, 2011
- The Brilliant Best ~Tie-Up Collection~ (The Brilliant Best～タイアップコレクション～), released August 7, 2013
- Emergence, released January 29, 2014
