= To Heart =

1997 Japanese adult visual novel, manga, and anime television series

- Cover of the first regular edition for PC featuring Akari Kamigishi
- Genre: Drama, harem, romance
- Video game
- Developer: Leaf
- Publisher: Aquaplus
- Genre: Eroge, visual novel
- Platform: Windows, PS, PS2, PSP
- Released: May 23, 1997 (Original Windows); March 25, 1999 (PS)
- Manga
- Written by: Leaf
- Illustrated by: Ukyō Takao
- Published by: MediaWorks
- English publisher: US: ADV Manga
- Magazine: Dengeki Daioh
- Original run: October 1997 – December 1999
- Volumes: 3
- Anime television series
- Directed by: Naohito Takahashi; Tooru Minazuki (Supervision)
- Produced by: Saburō Ōmiya (Note: Credited under the pseudonym Hiroshi Iwakawa (岩川広司).); Shūkichi Kanda; Takashi Terasaki
- Written by: Hiroshi Yamaguchi
- Music by: Kaoru Wada
- Studio: OLM (Note: Team Wasaki)
- Licensed by: US: The Right Stuf International
- Original network: TV Kanagawa
- Original run: April 1, 1999 – June 24, 1999
- Episodes: 13
- Anime television series

To Heart: Remember My Memories
- Directed by: Keitarō Motonaga
- Produced by: Tsuneo Takechi; Yūtarō Mochizuki; Makoto Nakamura; Tetsuya Tsuchihashi; Tomoko Takayama; Toshi Hatanaka; Yasushi Shibahara; Takashi Mizukami
- Written by: Kiichi Kanō
- Music by: Seikō Nagaoka
- Studio: AIC A.S.T.A.
- Original network: AT-X
- Original run: October 2, 2004 – December 25, 2004
- Episodes: 13
- Manga

To Heart: Remember My Memories
- Written by: Leaf
- Illustrated by: Ukyō Takao
- Published by: MediaWorks
- Magazine: Dengeki Daioh
- Original run: November 2004 – July 2005
- Volumes: 1
- Game sequel
- To Heart 2

To Heart is a Japanese romance eroge visual novel developed by Leaf and released on May 23, 1997, for Windows. It was later ported to the PlayStation and given voice acting. A second PC version, titled To Heart PSE was released containing the PlayStation version as well as bonus games. To Heart PSE and the PlayStation version had the more intimate scenes removed. To Heart is Leaf's fifth game, and the third title in the Leaf Visual Novel Series, following Shizuku and Kizuato and preceding Routes. The gameplay in To Heart follows a plot line which offers predetermined scenarios with courses of interaction, and focuses on the appeal of the eight female main characters. A sequel of To Heart, To Heart 2, was released on December 28, 2004, for the PlayStation 2. A special bundle of To Heart 2 and a PS2 version of To Heart was released on the same day. The original PC release of the visual novel was titled To Heart, but the anime and the PSE versions later changed to ToHeart without any space between the words. The English release of the anime uses the former format. A remake, also titled ToHeart, was released on June 25, 2025, for Windows and the Nintendo Switch.

To Heart was adapted into a thirteen-episode anime television series by Oriental Light and Magic aired between April and July 1999, and a second anime, To Heart: Remember My Memories, aired between October and December 2004. The first anime was licensed by Right Stuf International for distribution in North America; the first DVD was released in March 2007. Two manga series were produced, both illustrated by Ukyō Takao and serialized in MediaWorks manga magazine Dengeki Daioh. The first manga, which ran between October 1997 and December 1999, was based on the original visual novel, and the second manga, which ran between November 2004 and July 2005, was based on the anime To Heart: Remember My Memories. A drama CD entitled Piece of Heart was released in October 1999.

== Premise ==
Set at a high school in the near future, the main character, Hiroyuki Fujita, is a student. He encounters ten pretty girls, including his childhood friend Akari and a maid robot Multi HMX-12, and must make the right decisions so as to win their hearts. In the anime adaptation, the story focuses on the relationship between Hiroyuki and Akari.

Hiroyuki Fujita (藤田 浩之, Fujita Hiroyuki)
Voiced by: Kazuya Ichijō, Shogo Sakata (Remake) (Japanese); Rich McNanna (English)
Hiroyuki is the main male character and has a dry attitude. He is surprisingly empathetic though, but usually shows it through his actions rather than what he says or how he acts towards people. Hiroyuki is also a childhood friend of Akari, and gradually throughout the storyline falls in love with her. He is sometimes dense when it comes to romance.

Akari Kamigishi (神岸 あかり, Kamigishi Akari)
Voiced by: Ayako Kawasumi, Kana Ichinose (Remake) (Japanese); Debora Rabbai (English)
Akari is Hiroyuki's childhood friend. She will almost always go to wake Hiroyuki up in the morning to go to school. She is especially fond of teddy bears, with special emphasis on the one that Hiroyuki gave her during their childhood. Both Akari and Hiroyuki have known each other since kindergarten and they are extremely close. She is very much in love with Hiroyuki and spends a lot of time around him. Akari likes to call Hiroyuki "Hiroyuki-chan" even though he hates being called that. Akari is very adept at cooking and is a member of the school's cooking club. In the game, she is just one of several female characters, but in the anime she adopts a central role, acting as narrator, with her romantic aspirations forming the main recurring theme of the series. In one episode (#7) she actually supplants Hiroyuki as the main character when she befriends the psychic girl Kotone: in all other episodes it is Hiroyuki who befriends the "guest" character of the episode. In the manga Akari has a less pivotal role (though still a major one), and it is Hiroyuki who befriends Kotone. In To Heart: Remember My Memories, her normally optimistic and somewhat naive personality takes on a more depressed and emotional tone when Hiroyuki begins to pay less attention to her and more to the android Multi, and her relationship with Hiroyuki nearly fell apart.

Shiho Nagaoka (長岡 志保, Nagaoka Shiho)
Voiced by: Chieko Higuchi, Kakeru Hota (Remake) (Japanese); Jessica Calvello (English)
Shiho first met Akari, Hiroyuki and Masashi during the first year of junior-high school. She is more of a tomboy than Akari, and often finds herself at odds with Hiroyuki, but towards the end of the 1st Anime series she starts to develop feelings for Hiroyuki, but later decides her friendship with Akari is more important. She is feisty and aggressive, yet close to Akari. She is a real gossip fanatic, often coming up with random ideas that she titles "Shiho's News Flash" or "Shiho's Advice". Most of what goes on in school and the students do not pass by her unnoticed, but according to Hiroyuki, "90% of what she says isn't true". Though this is a bit of a hyperbole, Shiho does sometimes get her facts wrong.

Multi (マルチ, Maruchi; (HMX-12))
Voiced by: Yui Horie, Hina Yōmiya (Remake) (Japanese); Eden Riegel (English)
An experimental humanoid maid robot from the HM (Human Maiden) series robots made by Kurusugawa Electronics, she was sent to Fujita's school to learn how to behave like a human. Multi is a cheerful girl who loves to clean, but she isn't very good at it nor household chores, which contradicts her purpose. In the anime, Hiroyuki and Akari help Multi to improve her skills. In order to charge her batteries, she needs to be connected to a laptop with a cable stored in her hand. She becomes a central character in To Heart: Remember My Memories when she appears to have had her memories erased (particularly those of her times spent with Hiroyuki), resulting in a dilemma for Hiroyuki and inadvertently causing grief for Akari.

Tomoko Hoshina (保科 智子, Hoshina Tomoko)
Voiced by: Aya Hisakawa, Yuki Nagaku (Remake) (Japanese); Lisa Ortiz (English)
Tomoko is a native of Kobe and speaks the Kansai dialect. She has a serious, responsible nature, and serves as the class president. Her seriousness is conveyed by her tightly bound hair and coke-bottle glasses, though she is quite pretty when she removes these features (in fact, the change is so drastic that in To Heart: Remember My Memories Hiroyuki and company don't recognize her at all when they encounter her in Kobe, until she puts on her glasses and holds her hair in a ponytail). It is hinted that she might have liked Hiroyuki in To Heart: Remember My Memories as she said he was slow when he asked her why she told him about her family's past. She moved from Kobe as a result of problems between her parents. Her quiet and concentrated nature is one of her ways of hiding her problems and she will often keep to herself.

Serika Kurusugawa (来栖川 芹香, Kurusugawa Serika)
Voiced by: Junko Iwao, Azumi Satou (Remake) (Japanese); Carol Jacobanis (English)
Serika is a member of the Kurusugawa family, which is extremely wealthy and operates a conglomerate of companies in their name, including the labs which produced Multi and Serio. She speaks quietly and it is difficult to hear what she says unless standing right beside her - as a result, Hiroyuki repeats what she just said. She is addressed as "ojō-sama" (a respectful title) by the family servants and is picked up by a limousine everyday. Serika is also much into the occult and is the sole member of the school's Occult Research Club. She is also often protected by her butler, Sebastian. In To Heart: Remember My Memories, she demonstrates the level of authority she has over the Kurusugawa group by overruling the security of a Kurusugawa-owned Amusement Park when Hiroyuki and company try to break into it at night.

Ayaka Kurusugawa (来栖川 綾香, Kurusugawa Ayaka)
Voiced by: Junko Iwao, Azumi Satou (Remake) (Japanese); Elizabeth Johnson (English)
Ayaka is Serika's younger sister. Despite looking similar, they have totally different character personalities. Ayaka is outgoing and confident, and enjoys martial arts. They get along very well, but go to different schools and have different paths in life.

Lemmy Miyauchi (宮内 レミィ, Miyauchi Remii)
Voiced by: Rumi Kasahara, Ai Fukada (Remake) (Japanese); Karen Thompson (English)
Lemmy is half American, half Japanese - her full name is Lemmy Christopher Helen Miyauchi. She speaks Japanese with a stereotypical American accent, and often makes mistakes with the meanings of Japanese sayings. She also has a tendency to slip in English words during conversations when she has the chance. She also ends a lot of her sentences with "-ne" and overuses the word "fantastic". Near the end of To Heart: Remember My Memories she admits to Hiroyuki that she has always loved him and wants him to return to America with her so he can go to a good school with robotic engineering. She is exceptionally tall and is the only major character who is taller than Hiroyuki. Her height, bust, blue eyes, blonde hair, and unusual personality is how her foreign blood is represented which is typical of many Japanese series that contain foreigners. Lemmy is also a member of the kyūdō club (Japanese archery).

Aoi Matsubara (松原 葵, Matsubara Aoi)
Voiced by: Mayumi Iizuka, Saho Shirasu (Remake) (Japanese); Veronica Taylor (English)
She is a practitioner of a particular style of martial arts known as "Extreme Rules" (i.e., mixed martial arts), but because she doesn't adhere to the more traditional martial arts such as Karate, she is spurned by the mainstream martial artists. She is still a very determined girl. She idolizes Ayaka Kurusugawa since the latter also happens to practice the same "Extreme Rules" form of martial arts. She possibly likes Hiroyuki as shown during her conversation with Yoshikata, as the latter described Kotone as "Aoi's rival for that guy", which she replies "I guess you could say it that way".

Kotone Himekawa (姫川 琴音, Himekawa Kotone)
Voiced by: Kyoko Hikami, Yuka Nukui (Remake) (Japanese); Amy Kincaid (English)
A girl with psychic powers, but is unable to fully control them. When she was introduced, it is revealed that she does not have control over her psychic powers, but instead bottling them up until she can no longer restrain them anymore, causing devastation. She likes udon. Her psychic power is psychokinesis in the game, and prediction in the anime series. This has changed back into psychokinesis in To Heart: Remember My Memories. She had a crush on Masashi in the first season, though in Remember My Memories, she admits to being in love with Hiroyuki, and her relationship with Masashi not mentioned.

Rio Hinayama (雛山 理緒, Hinayama Rio)
Voiced by: Ikue Ōtani, Momoka Terasawa (Remake) (Japanese); Elisabeth Morinelli (English)
She can be unlocked after completing Akari's scenario. She spends time on getting part-time jobs, and is a fan of romance manga and anime. She is very self-sufficient, and has several part-time jobs including selling cakes at Christmas and delivering the paper. She has feelings for Hiroyuki. She has the feature of "hair antennae" (a pair of long hairs that stick straight up), which is rampant in some anime but unique in this one.

== Gameplay ==
Average dialogue and narrative in To Heart depicting the main character Hiroyuki talking to Lemmy.

To Heart is a romance visual novel. Its gameplay requires little player interaction as much of the game's duration is spent on reading the text that appears on the screen, which represents the story's narrative and dialogue. The text is accompanied by character sprites, which represent who Hiroyuki is talking to, over background art. Throughout the game, the player encounters CG artwork at certain points in the story, which take the place of the background art and character sprites. A gallery of the viewed CGs and played background music is available on the game's title screen. To Heart follows a branching plotline with multiple endings, and depending on the decisions that the player makes during the game, the plot will progress in a specific direction.

The game divides each school day of the storyline into four segments. These segments illustrate the events that occur during Hiroyuki's commute to school, during school, after school, and after he returns home at the end of each day. Depending on the time of the day and the player's actions, they may be presented one of four types of events: dated events, which occur automatically during certain points in the game's plotline; affection events, which occur during certain periods of time only if specific conditions pertaining to a character's affection towards Hiroyuki are met; frequency events, which occur after meeting a character a predetermined number of times; and VS events, which occurs if two characters' affection towards Hiroyuki conflict with one another.

At the end of each school day, the player is given the option to navigate to various locations within the game's setting. Each choosable location is accompanied by an image of a heroine in order to allow the choices to be easier to make. Every so often, the player will also come to a "decision point", where they are given the chance to choose from multiple options. Text progression pauses at these points, and depending on the choices that the player makes, the affection rate of the heroine associated with the event will either increase, decrease, or remain the same. This mechanism determines which direction of the plot the player will progress into. There are ten plotlines that the player will have the chance to experience, one for each of the heroines in the story. The game also contains a bad ending in which the player is unable to pursue the other scenarios. In order to view all of the plot lines, the player will have to replay the game multiple times and make different decisions to progress the plot in an alternate direction.

In the versions released since the original, there are six bonus minigames available. The first game is a platform game called "Heart by Heart", in which the player controls a To Heart character in one of the thirty static, non-moving levels. The player's objective is to defeat all of the enemies in the level using various attacks within a time limit. The minigame also features a two-player variation, in which the players may compete or cooperate with each other within the game's levels. The second, "", is a puzzle game in which the player gains points by forming and eliminating lines of three or more blocks of the same shape. The player achieves this by swapping the preexisting blocks in the game's screen with those in a bank of blocks allotted to them. The third minigame, titled "Ojō-sama wa Majo" (お嬢様は魔女), is a side-scrolling shooter game featuring Serika Kurusugawa. The player's goal is to progress through a horizontally scrolling level, while attacking enemies and dodging their attacks. "Katamomi Multi" (肩もみマルチ; Shoulder-rubbing Multi) and "Katamomi Serio" (肩もみセリオ; Shoulder-rubbing Serio) are bonus scenarios in which the player is given simulated massages by the characters Multi or Serio using the DualShock controller's vibration function. Lastly, "Water Survival" (ウォーターサバイバル, Uōtaa Sabaibaru) is a minigame that appears in Shiho Nagaoka's scenario, in which Hiroyuki and Shiho attempt to shoot each other with water guns.

== Development ==
After completing Shizuku and Kizuato, main planner and scenario writer Tatsuya Takahashi began conceptualizing the third entry to the Leaf Visual Novel Series, which would later become To Heart. Takahashi originally considered creating a story with dark fantasy and gothic themes, but changed his approach in order to avoid making three consecutive works with dark themes. He then settled on creating a romance, and later incorporated comical elements. Early in development, Takahashi consulted frequent collaborator Tōru Minazuki for the creation of the story. The two originally considered creating the story and characters entirely by themselves, but after Minazuki expressed his concern that having only six heroines is not enough to exemplify a romance theme, the two asked writer Saki Aomura and illustrator Hisashi Kawata to assist in the project's development. Out of the ten heroines created, Takahashi wrote the scenarios for Akari, Multi, Tomoko, Serika, Aoi, and Ayaka; Aomura authored the scenarios for Lemmy, Kotone, and Shiho; and the scenario for Rio was written by a third writer named Udaru Harada. Minazuki designed and illustrated Takahashi's characters, while Kawata illustrated the remaining characters.

The writers did not begin work on the story until the characters were created. Takahashi felt the game's story is simply actions that represent what becomes of the characters. He mentioned the story exists not because he wanted to write the story, but because he wanted to "illustrate" the characters. Takahashi believed that such a writing style was unique even within the game industry at the time, but has since become the norm. Although the story contains futuristic elements such as maid robots, Takahashi stated the story takes place during contemporary times. Parts of the school in which the game takes place was based on the alma mater that Takahashi, Minazuki, and Aomura had attended, and Takahashi said the game's story reflects the staff members' school experience during the 1980s. To Heart was released as an eroge visual novel for Microsoft Windows PCs on May 23, 1997, following the releases of the previous Leaf Visual Novel Series titles.

=== PlayStation release ===
The original Windows version was followed by an all-ages version for the PlayStation on March 25, 1999. Takahashi viewed the PS port as a "brand new game" under the disguise of a ported title, as he believed the original staff in the development team could not be satisfied with simply a straightforward port. Several changes were made to the PS version, including the removal of adult scenes and additions such as voice acting, new and rewritten scenarios, a new heroine named Ayaka Kurusugawa, and bonus minigames.

Takahashi stated that the addition of voice acting was decided upon early into development, but because of the high amount of memory needed to store the voice acting's audio files, the decision caused the development team to debate between using higher quality audio or a smaller number of discs. Ultimately, the amount of data required by the voice acting caused the game to be released on two discs. Aomura also made changes to the stories of his characters, and he admitted that he did not thoroughly understand Shiho's character while writing her scenario for the Windows version's development. He made revisions to the scenario in the PS version, and saw the result as a completed version. Takahashi felt the majority of the scenarios were smoother without the erotic scenes present in the original version, and stated that the original's inclusion of fan service scenes was a natural decision made during development, despite how they felt forced to him.

=== Subsequent releases ===
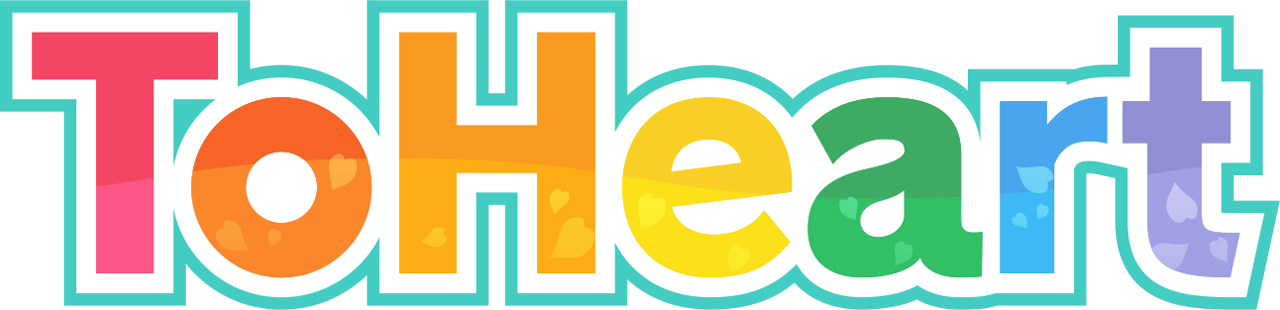
ToHeart logo for Remake

To Heart received two versions for the Microsoft Windows operating system in 2003. The first is a "renewal package" re-release based on the original release version, and was released on June 20, with additional support for Windows ME/2000/XP PCs. An enhanced re-release, titled To Heart PSE, was also released for Windows PCs on June 27. Unlike the renewal package release, PSE is an all-ages release, and contains the additional content found in the PS version. The visual novel also received a version playable on the PlayStation 2, when the game was released as part of To Heart 2's limited deluxe pack on December 28, 2004. The PS2 version of the game was enhanced from the previous PS release, and was not included with the limited or regular edition releases of To Heart 2. Lastly, a PlayStation Portable version, titled To Heart Portable, was released as part of the To Heart 2 Portable's "W Pack" and limited edition releases on July 30, 2009. Portable was also released individually as a budget-priced version on October 27, 2011. Characters from To Heart are also playable in Aquapazza: Aquaplus Dream Match, a fighting game developed by Aquaplus featuring characters from various Leaf games. A remake of the first game, titled ToHeart and featuring 3D graphics for the characters and while it features newly recorded voice acting from the new voice actors for the remake, players can also switch between the original Playstation version of the voice recording and the remake version at will, released on Windows and the Nintendo Switch on June 26, 2025.

== Adaptations ==
=== Print ===
A guidebook for the original visual novel titled To Heart Official Guidebook: The Essence of To Heart (トゥハート公式ガイドブック―The essence of To Heart) was published by Enterbrain in June 2000. The book contains a comprehensive walkthrough for the entire To Heart visual novel, along with a gallery of all the obtainable CGs, as well as stage-by-stage descriptions of all three bonus games included in the PlayStation and PSE versions. A To Heart Visual Fan Book (To Heart ビジュアルファンブック) was released by MediaWorks, and contains images from the PS version.

A manga adaptation based on the original To Heart visual novel was illustrated by Ukyō Takao and serialized in MediaWorks' shōnen manga magazine Dengeki Daioh between October 1997 and December 1999; the chapters were later compiled into three bound volumes published under MediaWorks' Dengeki Comics imprint. The manga was licensed by ADV Manga. A manga based on the anime adaptation To Heart: Remember My Memories was also drawn by Takao and was serialized in Dengeki Daioh between November 2004 and July 2005; one volume was released.

=== Anime ===
To Heart logo for anime series

A thirteen-episode anime series adaptation produced by Oriental Light and Magic and directed by Naohito Takahashi aired in Japan between April 1 and June 24, 1999. The overall story centers around Akari Kamigishi's blossoming relationship with the protagonist Hiroyuki. Six short bonus broadcasts were produced and aired after selected episodes. They lasted around five minutes and followed the general style of the main anime, although the characters are drawn super deformed. Three pieces of theme music were used for the episode; one opening theme and two ending themes. The opening theme is "Feeling Heart" by Masami Nakatsukasa; the first ending theme is "Yell" by Ayako Kawasumi, and the second ending theme is "Access" by Spy. Different ending themes were used depending on the location of the broadcast. The DVD and VHS releases used "Yell" as the ending theme. A set of six DVDs, videotapes and laserdiscs were sold in Japan for the To Heart anime.

To Heart was licensed for North American release by The Right Stuf International at Anime Expo 2004 on July 3, at their panel. Volume one was scheduled for late 2005, but the master's copy Right Stuf received from Japan were in bad shape, delaying the release. Due to the fact that To Heart was animated in the process of cel animation, it was captured on film instead of digitally on a computer, but the film masters had been destroyed, and their only choice was to restore and digitally remaster the video that they had been sent. All thirteen episodes and the six bonus extra were released on four DVD volumes between March 27 and August 28, 2007.

A sequel anime series entitled To Heart: Remember My Memories is set a year after the conclusion of the first anime and completes the anime's storyline (deviating from the visual novel). The future of Akari, Hiroyuki, and Multi are also shown. In To Heart: Remember My Memories, characters' hair color changed, for example Hiroyuki's hair, which turned from a dark brown to a greenish blue. The Himeyuri twins from To Heart 2 make their debut appearances in To Heart: Remember My Memories as speaking cameos. The anime, which was produced by AIC and Oriental Light and Magic, and directed by Keitaro Motonaga, aired in Japan between October 2 and December 25, 2004, compiling thirteen episodes. The episodes were released on seven DVD compilation volumes in Japan. Seven short omake episodes titled Heart Fighters were released with the consumer DVD versions of To Heart: Remember My Memories; they are not available on rental DVDs. Unlike the bonus shorts of the first season, the characters are not drawn super deformed and there is an overall arching mini-story. The humor comes from its parodies of popular Japanese culture. Two pieces of theme music were used for the episodes; one opening theme and one ending theme. The opening theme is "Daisuki da yo (大好きだよ) (Into Your Heart)" by Naomi Tanisaki, that ranked at No. 63 on the Japanese Oricon weekly singles chart, and the ending theme is "Sorezore no Mirai e" (それぞれの未来へ) by Haruna Ikeda.

=== Audio CDs ===
A drama CD based on the original To Heart visual novel entitled Piece of Heart was released on October 27, 1999. The story revolves around Serio at her assigned high school alongside and after the anime version when Multi is still studying at Hiroyuki's school. A drama CD released for the second anime series was released on January 26, 2005.

The original theme song was "Brand New Heart", as opposed to "Feeling Heart" which was used in all subsequent versions and in the anime. A music single for the game, "Heart to Heart", was released on July 2, 1997. The visual novel's original soundtrack was released on May 28, 1999. Leaf released a piano arrange album entitled Leaf Piano Collection Volume 1 released in July 2002. The album contains popular songs from several of Leaf's visual novels, including three from To Heart. The first anime's original soundtrack entitled To Heart: Animation Sound Track was released on July 9, 1999. The anime's soundtrack contains all the tunes heard in the anime, as well as TV size versions of the ending song "Yell". It does not contain the opening song "Feeling Heart", which is found on either the "Feeling Heart" single released on April 2, 1999, or the original soundtrack from the game. A single for the second anime, "Daisuki da yo (大好きだよ) (Into Your Heart)", was released on November 25, 2004, and contains both full and instrumental versions of the opening and ending themes. The soundtrack for the second anime titled To Heart: Remember My Memories Soundtrack & Image Song was released on December 22, 2004; the image song contained is sung by the Ayako Kawasumi, the voice actress of Akari Kamagishi.

== Reception ==
On release, the video game magazine Famitsu scored the PlayStation version of the game a 30 out of 40. In the October 2007 issue of Dengeki G's Magazine, poll results for the 50 best bishōjo games were released. Out of 249 titles, To Heart ranked 19th with 14 votes.
