= December When There Is No Angel =

2003 video game

- Developer: Leaf
- Publisher: Leaf
- Producer: Naoya Shimokawa
- Platform: Microsoft Windows
- Release: JP: September 26, 2003
- Genres: Eroge, Visual novel
- Mode: Single-player

December When There Is No Angel (Japanese: 天使のいない12月, Hepburn: Tenshi no Inai 12-gatsu) is a Japanese adult visual novel developed and published by Leaf. The game was released in both CD-ROM and DVD formats on September 26, 2003.

== Characters ==
- Tokinori Kida (木田 時紀, Kida Tokinori) is the game's protagonist. Although he is an unfriendly and relatively volatile young man, he gets along with his best friends to some extent. He has no real interest in relationships or what is expected of him in life, and because of this he holds the belief that the world would be better off without him. Despite being someone who lacks direction, he is quick to act when the situation calls for it. His only source of comfort is smoking cigarettes.
- Touko Kurihara (栗原 透子, Kurihara Tōko) - Kida's classmate. A simple girl that is seen as troublesome by most, and a true nuisance to Kida. Despite knowing that she is slow and somewhat bothersome to others, Touko feels she needs to do her best and contribute to the world. Unfortunately, the fact that Touko has never had a chance to prove herself has left her with a desire to find something that will give her own life some meaning. She finds that meaning upon meeting Kida and will do anything to preserve it.
- Shinobu Sakaki (榊 しのぶ, Sakaki Shinobu) - Kida's classmate and Touko's best friend. A sharp-tongued and quick-witted girl who holds the position of class representative. Having known Touko all of her life, Shinobu has taken it upon herself to look after Touko and punish anyone who crosses her. This has done more harm than good for Touko, even if Shinobu is mostly unaware of this. Her devotion is so strong that her classmates suspect that Shinobu and Touko might be romantically involved.
- Asuna Asou (麻生 明日菜, Asō Asuna) - An older girl that works at the local cake shop. Asuna is generally amicable and is very willing to give advice, and is somewhat romantic. She instantly takes a liking to Kida upon meeting him, and vows to look after him. Though she seems to be quite comfortable with the role as the "older sister" leading the "inexperienced younger man", her demeanor changes to that of a tense and quiet person whenever her past is brought up.
- Yukio Sumadera (須磨寺 雪緒, Sumadera Yukio) - A girl from Kida's school. Yukio is respected and admired by the underclassmen, who see her as an intelligent and beautiful senpai. Though Yukio seems to have an ideal reputation and proves to be a very capable young woman, she has decided to abandon the idea of forming bonds with others, disliking attention.
- Maho Hazuki (葉月 真帆, Hazuki Maho) - An energetic girl in the lacrosse team and Shimomura Isao's girlfriend. She thinks of Kida as her older brother and seems to feel more at ease around him than around her boyfriend. Maho doesn't play much of a role in the majority of ideas that are not her own.
- Emiri Kida (木田 恵美梨, Kida Emiri) - The younger sister of Tokinori. Despite being the younger of the two, Emiri is undoubtedly the more dominating and, in some ways, has seized control of the household. Despite their disagreements, Emiri still has a strong bond with her brother. She has learned to lower her expectations of him due to his lack of direction. She also respects and admires Yukio.
- Isao Shimomura (霜村 功, Shimomura Isao) - Kida's best friend and Maho's boyfriend. Isao can be considered to be the opposite of Kida, and as such is outgoing and more of an optimist. He is completely focused on his plans for spending Christmas with Maho, but is unaware of how uncomfortable she feels about the prospect of sex and sexuality during their time together.
- Bungo Sugamo (巣鴨 文吾, Sugamo Bungo) - The short-tempered owner of the cake shop. He is Asuna's uncle through marriage and a talented pâtissier. His role is minimal for the most part, but he serves as the adult figure amidst the chaotic events of the game. He becomes more important in Asuna's storyline.
- Tachibana (橘) - Kida, Shinobu and Touko's English teacher. An unpleasant man that is disliked by most students due to his tendency to show up at the worst possible moments.

== Staff ==
- Producer - Naoya Shimokawa (下川 直哉, Shimokawa Naoya)
- Director - Tsutomu Washimi (鷲見 努, Washimi Tsutomu)
- Scenario - Shousuke Miyake (三宅 章介, Miyake Shōsuke)
- Character Designs - Takeshi Nakamura (なかむら たけし, Nakamura Takeshi), Misato Mitsumi (みつみ 美里, Mitsumi Misato)
- Music - Junya Matsuoka (松岡 純也, Matsuoka Junya), Shinya Ishikawa (石川 真也, Ishikawa Shinya), Naoya Shimokawa (下川 直哉, Shimokawa Naoya), Kazuhide Nakagami (中上 和英, Nakagami Kazuhide)
- Character Voices:
  - Hinata Ayukawa (鮎川 ひなた, Ayukawa Hinata) (Touko Kurihara)
  - Sakura Takatsuki (鷹月 さくら, Takatsuki Sakura) (Shinobu Sakaki)
  - Ibuki Minami (皆美 伊吹, Minami Ibuki) (Asuna Asou)
  - Honoka Imuraya (井村屋 ほのか, Imuraya Honoka) (Yukio Sumadera)
  - Oto Agumi (安玖深 音, Agumi Oto) (Maho Hazuki)
  - Miru (みる) (Emiri Kida)

== Music ==
December When There Is No Angel has an opening theme named "I Hope So", and an ending theme named "Hitori" (ヒトリ). "I Hope So" is sung by Haruna Ikeda and "Hitori" is sung by Akko.
