= Aquaplus =

Japanese publishing and distribution company for visual novels

- Native name: 株式会社アクアプラス
- Romanized name: Kabushikigaisha Akuapurasu
- Formerly: U-Office; Aqua
- Company type: Kabushiki gaisha Joint stock company
- Industry: Computer games, Music, Restaurants
- Founded: October 1994; 31 years ago
- Headquarters: Yodogawa-ku, Osaka, Japan
- Key people: Minoru Noda (CEO); Naoya Shimokawa (COO)
- Products: Visual novels, Albums
- Parent: HIKE (2022–2025); Yuke's (2025–)
- Subsidiaries: F.I.X RECORDS
- Website: aquaplus.jp/index.html

Aquaplus (株式会社アクアプラス, Kabushiki gaisha Akuapurasu), formerly U-Office (ユーオフィス, Yū Ofisu) and Aqua (アクア, Akua), is a Japanese company which specializes primarily in the publishing and distribution of visual novels, including both adult games under their brand Leaf and games for all ages under Aquaplus's own brand. Aquaplus has been involved with the production of anime based on Leaf's games. The company is also involved with music, franchised restaurants, and at one point was involved with automobiles.

== History ==
Aquaplus was established in October 1994 in Itami, Hyōgo, Japan as a visual novel and music publishing company at the time called U-Office, ltd. (有限会社ユーオフィス, Yūgengaisha Yū Ofisu); their adult game brand Leaf was also established at this time.

In February 1995, Leaf produced their first game, and later that year in November U-Office started releasing all-ages games for the PC under their name. The company changed its name to Aqua (アクア, Akua) in May 1996, and became a joint stock company. In 1997, Aqua opened their automobile specialty shop Aqua in Yachiyo, Hyōgo, Japan. In 1998, the company changed their name to the current Aquaplus. In October of that year, Aquaplus opened a development office in Toshima, Tokyo.

In March 1999, Aquaplus published their first visual novel on a home console, To Heart, for the PlayStation. In May two months later, Fix Records was established as the record label for albums released through, and related to, Aquaplus; the soundtrack for the PS version of To Heart was the label's first production. In June 2000, the head office moved to its current location in Yodogawa-ku, Osaka, Japan. In November 2001, Aquaplus produced their PDA/handheld game console P/ECE. In 2002, Aquaplus became involved in managing franchised restaurants. At the end of 2002, Aquaplus moved their Tokyo development office to Taitō, Tokyo. In August 2007, Aquaplus closed down their automobile specialty shop Aqua. In 2011, Aquaplus developed the 2D arcade fighting game Aquapazza: Aquaplus Dream Match, with all the characters coming from various Leaf visual novels.

The company was acquired by Crest (currently: HIKE) in December 2022.

=== Enterprises ===
Aquaplus is mainly involved with the publishing and distribution of visual novels, including both adult games under their brand Leaf and games for all ages under Aquaplus's own brand. Aquaplus manages a recording studio named Studio Aqua which puts out albums by Indie music artists in the Kansai region of Japan where Aquaplus is located. Albums released in connection with the visual novels the company publishes are also recorded at Studio Aqua. Aquaplus's record label is Fix Records, and excluding the artists with albums released by Studio Aqua, all albums produced by Aquaplus are on this label, including all albums related to the visual novels by Leaf and Aquaplus as well as some belonging to mainstream artists such as Suara. Aquaplus is involved with the franchised restaurants Toriaizu Gohei and Gyu-Kaku in Hyōgo, Japan. Aquaplus had managed an automobile specialty shop in Taka, Hyōgo, Japan called Aqua, but closed it down on August 31, 2007. The shop specialized in customizing Subarus, including for street races.

== P/ECE ==
In addition to software publishing, Aquaplus produced P/ECE, a greyscale mobile gaming platform that allows user to download games via USB or infrared port. The specifications of the P/ECE are as follows:

- Screen
  - Four-level grayscale FSTN LCD
  - 128 x 88 pixel resolution
- Sound: PC-9801
- CPU: EPSON S1C33209 24 MHz (32-bit RISC)
- Main Memory: 256kb SRAM
- Storage: 512kb flash RAM

P/ECE unit has preloaded 'Picket' software, which is an electronic organizer. Aquaplus offered downloadable freeware titles such as Multi's Going Out, Black Wings, TANK BATTLE, Ojomajomini, Inagawa de Urou!!.

== Animated works ==
- To Heart 2 OVA (2007, with Chaos Project)
- To Heart 2 AD (2008, with Chaos Project)
- To Heart 2 AD Plus (2009, with Chaos Project)
- Utawarerumono OVA (2009–2010, with Chaos Project)
- To Heart 2 AD Next (2010, with Chaos Project)
