= Seikai =

Seikai is the Japanese word for stars. Its usage in English usually refers to a series of various works by Hiroyuki Morioka:

1. Seikai no Monshō (Crest) a trilogy of light novels released April to June 1996, adapted into a 13-episode TV series in 1999, with a film that aired 7 April 2000
2. Seikai no Senki (Banner or Battle Flag) a series of 5 light novels that began December 1996, adapted into a 25-episode anime series (season 1 was 13 TV episodes in 2000 (beginning April 14 after the Monsho film), season 2 was 10 TV episodes in 2001, season 3 was 2 OVAs in 2005)
3. Seikai no Danshō (Fragments) two compilations of short stories by Morioka released in 2005 and 2007. The first edition contained a story originally published in 1996 which had been made into a TV special on 25 August 2000.

== See also ==
- List of Seikai characters
