= Piece of Wonder =

2002 video game

- Piece of Wonder USA Boxart
- Developer: JP: Studio Crossfire
- Publishers: JP: Studio Crossfire; NA: Hirameki International
- Platform: Windows 98
- Release: JP: February 2002; NA: 28 February 2007
- Genres: Visual novel, Tactical role-playing game
- Mode: Single player

Piece of Wonder is a hybrid tactical RPG and visual novel originally published in Japan in February 2002 by Studio Crossfire and released on January 21, 2007, in the United States by Hirameki International. The storyline incorporates science fiction elements.

== Plot ==
The game follows the experiences of high school student Kazuya Fuwa. He, his childhood friend Amane, an android named Raki, and a young girl named Shoko have powers awakened within them that allow them to use special abilities. They use these abilities to fight other superpowered creatures called "Evolutions".

== Gameplay ==
Most of the gameplay in Piece of Wonder follows the style of most visual novels; the majority of time spent playing the game is spent on reading through the dialogue or story that appears on screen. Every so often, the game will pause and the player is given a chance to choose from several different options regarding how the player wishes to advance the game. The plot will then branch into paths focusing on a single heroine depending on the choices that were made by the player; a conclusive character ending will be presented at the end of any given path.

Once the story progresses to a certain point, several combat levels appear. Played in classic RPG-style, the player takes control of the main characters and must accomplish a certain objective (usually to destroy all enemies on screen).

There are 3 different endings; one for each heroine. Once all three endings are completed, the true ending of the game can be unlocked and the truth behind the existence of the Evolutions is revealed.

== Characters ==
Kazuya Fuwa (不破和也)
However, when his friends are in danger, he would not hesitate to protect them at all cost. Out of the group, he was the first person to awaken his powers of "Evolution" when they were ambushed by hostile Evolutions by the riverside. He controls the power of the grim reaper.

Amane Saionji (西園寺 雨音)

voiced by Ayako Kawasumi

Amane is the childhood friend of Kazuya. Clumsy and a bit of an airhead, she is often clueless regarding the events that go on around her. Out of the group, she is the second person to awaken her powers of Evolution. She controls the power of the mermaid. Most of her attacks inflict water type damage, but also possess the power to heal allies as well. During combat gameplay, she is the primary healer of the group.

Raki Saionji (西園寺 羅鬼)

voiced by Miyuki Sawashiro

Raki is an android built by Amane's grandfather. In front of outsiders, Raki pretends to be the younger sister of Amane. Instead of tapping into the powers of "Evolution" (since Raki is an android), Raki could switch into battle mode at will. In her battle mode state, Raki could equip herself with a variety of weapons such as guns, launchers and beam weapons etc.

Shoko Maioka (舞岡 翔子)

voiced by Masayo Kurata

Shoko is the last person in the group to awaken her Evolution powers. She controls the power of the phoenix and could wield the destructive powers of fire at will. In her "Evolution" form, Shoko gains a pair of flaming wings which allows her to travel over most terrain with ease and thus giving her the greatest movement range during combat levels.
