= List of To Heart episodes =

To Heart is a 1999 Japanese anime television series based on the visual novel To Heart by the Japanese software company Leaf. The episodes, produced by the animation studio Oriental Light and Magic, are directed by Naohito Takahashi and aired in Japan between April 1 and June 24, 1999, compiling thirteen episodes. Six short bonus broadcasts were produced and aired after selected episodes. They lasted around five minutes and followed the general style of the main anime, although the characters are drawn super deformed. The overall story centers on Akari Kamigishi's blossoming relationship with the protagonist Hiroyuki. Three pieces of theme music were used for the episode; one opening theme and two ending themes. The opening theme is "Feeling Heart" by Masami Nakatsukasa; the first ending theme is "Yell" by Ayako Kawasumi, and the second ending theme is "Access" by Spy. Different ending themes were used depending on the location of the broadcast. The DVD and VHS releases used "Yell" as the ending theme. A set of six DVDs, videotapes and laserdiscs were sold in Japan for the To Heart anime.

To Heart was licensed for North American release by The Right Stuf International at Anime Expo 2004 on July 3, at their panel. Volume one was scheduled for late 2005, but the master copies Right Stuf received from Japan were in bad shape, delaying the release. Because To Heart was animated in the process of cel animation, it was captured onto film prior to conversion to video, and the video master showed dirt, glue marks, and other artifacts as a result of the process. Normally the original film would be restored to create a new master, but in this case the original film had been destroyed. As a result, the only choice was to digitally restore and remaster the video. All thirteen episodes and the six bonus extra was released on four DVD volumes between March 27 and August 28, 2007.

A sequel anime series entitled To Heart: Remember My Memories is set a year after the conclusion of the first anime and completes the anime's storyline (deviating from the visual novel). The future of Akari, Hiroyuki, and Multi are also shown. The Himeyuri twins from To Heart 2 make their debut appearances in To Heart: Remember My Memories as speaking cameos. The anime, which was produced by AIC and Oriental Light and Magic, and directed by Keitaro Motonaga, aired in Japan between October 2 and December 25, 2004, compiling thirteen episodes. The episodes were released on seven DVD compilation volumes in Japan. Seven short omake episodes titled Heart Fighters were released with the consumer DVD versions of To Heart: Remember My Memories; they are not available on rental DVDs. Unlike the bonus shorts of the first season, the characters are not drawn super deformed and there is an overall arching mini-story. The humor comes from its parodies of popular Japanese culture.

An anime television series for To Heart 2 was produced by Oriental Light and Magic and directed by Norihiko Sudō. Conisch and Kei Haneoka provided the soundtrack for the series. The episodes aired between October 3, 2005, and January 2, 2006, consisting of thirteen episodes. A three-episode original video animation series was produced by Aquaplus and Chaos Project with a new, original story. It was released on three DVDs between February 28 and September 28, 2007. A second OVA series titled To Heart 2: Another Days, was released on two DVDs, each containing an episode, between March 26 and August 8, 2008.

== To Heart ==
No.	Title	Original release date
1	"A Brand New Morning"; Transliteration: "Atarashii Asa" (Japanese: 新しい朝)	April 1, 1999
The anime opens with a scene from Akari's childhood - she has dropped all her books as it rains. While the other kids just walk past her, Hiroyuki helps her pick up her books. Many years have passed, and they're both second year high school students. It is the first day of school after summer holidays, and Akari wakes up Hiroyuki who is still asleep as usual. In their first homeroom, the teacher asks the class representative, Tomoko Hoshina, to assign new seats. Despite being harassed by a group of students, she continues to calmly make slips for a random draw. Hiroyuki decides to help Tomoko make the slips so he can go home earlier. The slips are made and draws conducted. Akari is lucky enough to draw the seat right next to Hiroyuki.
2	"After School Incident"; Transliteration: "Hōkago no Dekigoto" (Japanese: 放課後の出来事)	April 8, 1999
A popular band called "Childish an Hour" is due to perform at a sold out concert that week. Masashi tells Hiroyuki in private that he has only two tickets to Childish an Hour so Hiroyuki offers to talk to Akari and Shiho to see what can be done. In another scene, Shiho tells Akari she has two tickets to the concert. Hiroyuki searches the school for Shiho and when he finally does, they can't bring themselves to talk about the fact they both only have two tickets. In the end, they are unable to bring up the topic. Masashi and Hiroyuki, and Akari and Shiho both head to the concert not knowing they have enough tickets for all four of them. The four meet before the concert and figure out that there are actually four tickets and they all enjoy the concert without feeling guilty.
3	"In a Sunny Spot"; Transliteration: "Hidamari no Naka" (Japanese: 陽だまりの中)	April 15, 1999
Whilst sweeping up outside, Hiroyuki bumps into third year Serika Kurusugawa, the sole member of the school's Occult Research Society. Serika gets Hiroyuki to help her gather ingredients for a magic potion, and subsequently lends him a book on black magic and invites him to participate in one of her ceremonies. Hiroyuki however forgets and goes to a games arcade with Shiho, leaving Serika waiting alone after school until Akari notices her and goes to find Hiroyuki.
4	"Shining Moment"; Transliteration: "Kagayaki no Shunkan" (Japanese: 輝きの瞬間)	April 22, 1999
Switching from an older girl to a younger one, Hiroyuki is now the senpai who lets himself be entangled by the aspirations of a younger girl, the feisty first year Aoi who is trying to set up an Extreme Rules martial arts club. The head of the karate club comes to make trouble, and egged on by an outsider (who turns out to be Serika's younger sister) challenges Aoi to a fight. The episode culminates in a contest between the two girls which serves to attract new members to Aoi's fledgling club.
5	"Beneath the Blue Sky"; Transliteration: "Aoi Sora no Shita de" (Japanese: 青い空の下で)	April 29, 1999
At the school sports day, Shiho says that the good for nothing Hiroyuki has lost his team spirit; Akari feels he's still reliable. Hiroyuki slowly realizes everyone he knows has great expectations of him despite his lackadaisical demeanor, and he comes under pressure to join the relay team in addition to the race he has already agreed to run.
6	"Admiration"; Transliteration: "Akogare" (Japanese: 憧れ)	May 6, 1999
Rio is a plain jane who yearns for the manga fantasy world of dashing heroes and whirlwind romances. When a series of coincidences allow her to get to know her hero Hiroyuki, she thinks her luck is in, at least for an hour or two as they go shopping together for a birthday present for her brother. Meanwhile, Akari learns from Shiho that Hiroyuki is on a date with a dowdy girl, and wonders what is going on.
7	"Wavering Gaze"; Transliteration: "Yureru Manazashi" (Japanese: 揺れるまなざし)	May 13, 1999
Akari meets a withdrawn and apparently psychic girl Kotone, who is shunned by her classmates as jinxed. Akari politely ignores Kotone's warnings to keep away from her and manages to entice her to join her at a school soccer match.
8	"A Tranquil Time"; Transliteration: "Odayaka na Jikoku" (Japanese: おだやかな時刻)	May 20, 1999
Confined to bed with a cold, Shiho freaks out when she realizes that her absence means Hiroyuki and Akari are studying alone together in Akari's bedroom. During a short break, Hiroyuki looks at old pictures of Akari and himself. He realizes that he forgot most of the stuff that happened between them.
9	"Where The Heart Is"; Transliteration: "Kokoro no Arika" (Japanese: 心の在り処)	May 27, 1999
Culture festival is nearing and it's up to the girls of the class to decorate the class. Okada and her gang decide to change plans at the last moment and when things don't go as planned, they place the blame on Tomoko. Although everyone has gone home, Hiroyuki and Akari help Tomoko who stayed behind to finish the preparations.
10	"Dreaming Smile"; Transliteration: "Yumemiru Egao" (Japanese: 夢見る笑顔)	June 3, 1999
An eager-to-please but clueless prototype maid robot, the cute green-haired Multi, is sent to the school for trials.
11	"A Warm Gaze"; Transliteration: "Nukumori no Hitomi" (Japanese: ぬくもりの瞳)	June 10, 1999
Hiroyuki and Akari are dismayed to learn that if Multi fails her trials, her memory will be wiped and have a new software installed. They come into a question about what should constitute success: a highly skilled robot, or one people can relate to as a companion.
12	"The Season of Emotions"; Transliteration: "Omoi no Kisetsu" (Japanese: 想いの季節)	June 17, 1999
When Hiroyuki shows some kindness towards her, Shiho finds herself in a confusion of emotions, and realizes she's in love with him.
13	"On a Day of Snow"; Transliteration: "Yuki no Furu Hi" (Japanese: 雪の降る日)	June 24, 1999
Akari has been increasingly concerned that all her special shared moments with Hiroyuki seem to mean nothing to him, while Shiho seems to be making a play for him. With the worst possible timing, Akari gets confined to bed with a cold. When Shiho comes to visit, Akari puts her on the spot by asking if she's in love with Hiroyuki. Caught off-guard, Shiho is in a quandary and realizes she must choose between Akari's feelings and her own.

=== Bonus shorts ===
No.	Title	Original release date
1	"Usual Morning"; Transliteration: "Itsumo no Asa" (Japanese: いつもの朝)	TBA
Hiroyuki is awaken by Shiho, Serika and her butler is sweeping the school yard, Lemmy is spouting unlucky predictions, Multi is conducting black magic, Kotone is a member of the kyūdō club, Tomoko knocks Hiroyuki down with a well placed kick, Aoi is the respectable class president, and Akari is dispensing gossip and saying that she knows everything about Hiroyuki. When he goes to ask her what is going on, he finds himself in bed again: this time with Akari by his bedside trying to wake him up.
2	"Private Room"	TBA
It is a snowy night, and Kotone is at home studying. While writing, her mechanical pencil lead suddenly breaks. Kotone tries to push some more out, but even though she has plenty of lead in the pencil, it refuses to come out. She solves the problem by pushing lead through the front instead. Kotone sneezes, and uses a tissue. Instead of throwing it away directly, she tries to use her psychic abilities to slowly carry the tissue into the bin. She misses twice, but makes it on the third try, before being called down for dinner.
3	"Hanging Out"; Transliteration: "Toki ni wa Issho ni" (Japanese: 時には一緒に)	TBA
Ayaka Kurusagawa, Serio, and Hiroyuki go fishing. While Ayaka and Serio have some good bites, Hiroyuki hasn't caught any fish. Ayaka cheerfully speculates that it's because he isn't having fun as she continues to reel them in. After a while, no more fish are caught, but then suddenly Hiroyuki gets a bite and catches the largest fish of the day. He says that he has tartar sauce left over from lunch and that they should eat it now. Serio offers to help, and uses her laser eyes to grill the fish.
4	"Monster Shock"	TBA
Everyone finds out that their lunch has been stolen. Suddenly, from the classroom closet, a round yellow monster with many eyes and wings pops out. Everyone chases it to the roof, where it lies heaving and tired. None of them is willing to approach the monster. Serika informs everyone that the monster is a newborn baby. Its mother appears from the sky, and the baby monster returns to its mother. The mother thanks everyone for caring for her child and in appreciation, rains diamonds all over the school.
5	"Good Story"; Transliteration: "Chotto... Ii Hanashi" (Japanese: ちょっと...イイ話)	TBA
Multi and Serio are working part-time at a book store. When a child asks for an old picture book that is out of print, Multi goes out to look for a copy at used book stores and antique shops. She later meets up with Hoshina, who takes her to a flea market and finds the book that costs 2,000 yen, but Hoshina bargains the price down to 500 yen. Multi returns to the book store with the book and shows Serio what she learned: a Kansai-esque style of bargaining.
6	"Class has one hundred percent attendance today" Transliteration: "Kyō wa Bokura no Kurasu wa Zen'in Shusseki da" (Japanese: 今日は僕らのクラスは全員出席だ)	June 24, 1999
The class puts on a self-referential play in which they play themselves having homeroom and discussing what production they are going to perform for the culture festival. The performance segues into a reprise of the homeroom plot of the first episode, bringing the story full circle.

== To Heart: Remember My Memories ==
No.	Title	Original release date
1	"A New Premonition"; Transliteration: "Atarashii Yokan" (Japanese: 新しい予感)	October 2, 2004
2	"Past and Present"; Transliteration: "Mukashi to, Ima to" (Japanese: 昔と, 今と)	October 9, 2004
This episode is about a flashback where Hiroyuki first meets Multi. It is soon learned that Multi has lost her memory and that her mind is rejecting her memory from back then, so Hiroyuki tries really hard, but failed, and made a little progress.
3	"And Then, You..."; Transliteration: "Soshite, Kimi wa" (Japanese: そして, 君は)	October 16, 2004
4	"Strength and Kindness"; Transliteration: "Tsuyosa to, Yasashisa" (Japanese: 強さと, 優しさ)	October 23, 2004
Aoi is training for the upcoming extreme tournament with Hiroyuki as her training partner and Kotone acting as her manager. Akai and Multi stop by and help to clean the shrine when Ayaka who was out for a run as part of her training invites Aoi to join her and be her sparring partner at her mansion for a special training camp to prepare for the tournament. While at the mansion Multi and Seiro are sent to pick strawberries. While there the head gardener comes down with heat exhaustion at which time a helpless Multi can only comfort the old man while her sister robot contact an ambulance by her link to a satellite installed in her head. This makes Multi wonder whether she is really any use as a robot.
5	"The Wall That Must Be Scaled"; Transliteration: "Koeru Beki Kabe" (Japanese: 越えるべき壁)	October 30, 2004
6	"The City of Memories, the People in Memory"; Transliteration: "Omoide no Machi, Omoide no Hito" (Japanese: 思い出の街, 思い出の人)	November 6, 2004
7	"One Person's Wish, Two People's Dream"; Transliteration: "Hitori no Negai, Futari no Yume" (Japanese: 一人の願い, 二人の夢)	November 13, 2004
8	"A Robot's Dream"; Transliteration: "Robotto no Yume" (Japanese: ロボットの夢)	November 20, 2004
9	"Misunderstanding"; Transliteration: "Surechigau Kokoro" (Japanese: すれ違う心)	November 27, 2004
10	"A Long Night"; Transliteration: "Nagai Yoru" (Japanese: 長い夜)	December 4, 2004
11	"To Understand One Another"; Transliteration: "Wakariau Tame ni" (Japanese: 理解りあうために)	December 11, 2004
12	"My Whereabouts"; Transliteration: "Watashi no, Ibasho" (Japanese: わたしの, 居場所)	December 18, 2004
13	"To Their Respective Futures"; Transliteration: "Sorezore no Mirai e" (Japanese: それぞれの未来へ)	December 25, 2004

== To Heart 2 (anime television series) ==
No.	Title	Original release date
1	"New Uniform"; Transliteration: "Atarashii Seifuku" (Japanese: 新しい制服)	October 3, 2005
Takaaki picks up Konomi from her graduation ceremony from middle school and stays for dinner. He is asked to watch over Konomi by her mother when she goes out of town. Together, they spend the whole day having fun and end the day with Konomi showing off her new school uniform.
2	"Childhood Friend"; Transliteration: "Osananajimi" (Japanese: おさななじみ)	October 10, 2005
Tamaki Kōsaka returns home from an all-girls boarding school. Takaaki does not recognize her at first, but their reunion is filled with events that are identical to what happened in their past.
3	"The Small Tea Party"; Transliteration: "Chiisana Ochakai" (Japanese: 小さなお茶会)	October 17, 2005
Takaaki helps Manaka Komaki with volunteer work that she does to help the library club in an old teachers staff room. The next day, the library club leader tells her that her help won't be necessary because it's a job for the library club. She is unhappy to lose the job because the place where she calls her special spot is in the old room. Taking Takaaki advice to enjoy life more, she volunteers to take the job again despite the club leader's disapproval.
4	"Bicycle"; Transliteration: "Jitensha" (Japanese: 自転車)	October 24, 2005
Yuma Tonami is having a bad day because of Takaaki. She suspects that he's challenging her and challenges him to duels. Eventually, they become acquainted. As Yuma starts to show signs that something is troubling her, Manaka asks Takaaki to cheer her up.
5	"Invitation"; Transliteration: "Kan'yū" (Japanese: 勧誘)	October 31, 2005
Karin Sasamori is recruiting members for her mystery club. She tricks Takaaki into joining and blackmails him to keep him coming. At their first outdoor activity, they go to the mountains to search for UFOs and UMAs. The two become lost when they head off in the direction where Karin's UFO detector is picking up a signal, but they find their way back when the detector picks up another signal.
6	"A Charcoal Brazier and a Girl"; Transliteration: "Shichirin to Shōjo" (Japanese: 七輪と少女)	November 7, 2005
Rūko Kireinasora transfer into Takaaki's class. She claims to be an alien who crashed while exploring the earth. Karin orders Takaaki to spy on Rūko and then to tie a UFO detector collar on the cat that Rūko gives food to. While Takaaki is tying the collar on, the cat struggles and jumps into a stream. Not knowing what to do, Rūko strikes down a tree with lighting so Takaaki can save the cat.
7	"UFO"	November 14, 2005
Takaaki invites everyone to a star-gazing event the mystery club is holding. At the event, it is revealed that the event is really a UFO calling party with Rūko as a special guest. No aliens come, but the crowd is entertained by a meteor shower.
8	"Mismatched Feelings"; Transliteration: "Surechigau Omoi" (Japanese: すれちがう想い)	November 21, 2005
Takaaki saves Sango Himeyuri and she confesses to him. Her sister, Ruri, does not approve and spreads rumors that Takaaki is a pervert. Even though Takaaki is nice to Ruri, she continues to try to get Takaaki to promise her that he will stay away from Sango.
9	"Together"; Transliteration: "Futari" (Japanese: ふたり)	November 28, 2005
Takaaki and Yūji invites Sango and Ruri to an amusement park. At the end of the day Sango wants a penguin stuffed animal but the only place where you can get it is from a crane machine. Ruri and Takaaki spend all their money, but they finally get one so Ruri can give it to Sango as a present.
10	"Promise"; Transliteration: "Yakusoku" (Japanese: 約束)	December 5, 2005
Sango helps develop the next generation maid android named Ilfa. The developers allow Ilfa to stay and serve at the Himeyuri residents, but Ruri feels left out when Ilfa makes them dinner. The next day, Ilfa asks Takaaki for advice on how to be Ruri's friend.
11	"Fully Bloomed Double Cherry Blossoms"; Transliteration: "Mankai no Yaezakura" (Japanese: 満開の八重桜)	December 12, 2005
Tamaki invites all of Takaaki's friends to her house for a tea ceremony. There, she thanks them for taking care of her Takaaki.
11.5	"Special Compilation"; Transliteration: "Tokubetsuhen" (Japanese: 特別編)	December 24, 2005
A summary of all the characters that encountered with Takaaki.
12	"Spring Breeze"; Transliteration: "Harukaze" (Japanese: 春風)	December 19, 2005
Konomi hangs out with friends that she never seen since she graduated from middle school. Her friends asks her if she found someone she likes and she starts to get confused with her feelings when she sees Takaaki with Sango and Ruri. On their way to school, Konomi's friends confront Takaaki to ask him about his relationship with Konami, but when Takaaki tells them that he sees her as a little sister, Konomi runs away.
13	"Start in the Morning"; Transliteration: "Hajimari no Asa" (Japanese: はじまりの朝)	December 26, 2005
The second year's overnight trip is coming soon and Takaaki has still yet to confront Konomi and apologize. Takaaki searches for her all over the school but it looks like she's avoiding him. With encouragement from Tamaki, Takaaki continues his search until he finds her walking her dog. Finally able to talk, they sort out the misunderstanding.

== To Heart 2 (OVA) ==
No.	Title	Original release date
1	"The Beginnings of Maid Robot"; Transliteration: "Meido Robo Hajimemashita" (Japanese: メイドロボはじめました)	February 28, 2007
The episode starts out with Yuji really excited about something and is soon learned that Ilfa was going to serve Kosaka household. Yuji attempts to get indecent footages of Ilfa using a wide variety of video cameras, starting from new and expensive ones but gradually using older and cheaper ones as Tamaki smashes them every time she caught him at it. In the end, Ilfa learned many things from Tamaki, including being "open" and her infamous "Forehead Squeeze" which she tried out on Yuji at the end of her stay at the Kousaka household.
Special	"Short Story"; Transliteration: "Shōto Sutōrī" (Japanese: ショートストーリー)	February 28, 2007
2	"Summer of the Liveliest Sea"; Transliteration: "Ano Natsu, Ichiban Sawagashii Umi" (Japanese: あの夏, 一番騒がしい海)	June 27, 2007
Takaaki, Yuusuke and all the girls make a visit to the beach, and Takaaki invites class-rep Manaka's sickly younger sister Ikuno to tag along. As Ikuno suspects Takaaki to be Manaka's boyfriend she hesitatingly accepts, intending to act as guardian for her precious sister, but when she learns more about those weird characters she soon changes her attitude.
3	"Everyone's School Festival, A Modest Wish"; Transliteration: "Minna no Gakuensai, Sasayaka na Negai" (Japanese: みんなの学園祭, ささやかな願い)	September 28, 2007
Takaaki and shy student council member Kusugawa Sasara have worked out plans for the school festival, but school president Marianne, Kusugawa's only friend, rewrites these plans at the festival's eve, adding many weird "libido" elements, thus turning the whole school into a chaotic zone.

== To Heart 2 ad ==
No.	Title	Original release date
1	"The Nail Mark of Memories"; Transliteration: "Omoide no Tsumeato" (Japanese: 思い出の爪痕)	March 26, 2008
Takaaki has recently lost his memory, and the girls do everything possible to help fill in the gaps with pleasant memories while keeping him from remembering what happened. Within this, Tamaki seems to have a specific memory that she holds dear involving a particular letter.
2	"Happy New Year"	August 8, 2008
Takaaki and his "harem" make a New Year visit at the shrine nearby and spent the first night of the year outside to watch the sunrise. Most of them get "bad luck" for their fortune cookie though, with Yuma being the only exception. Yuma's cookie tells her she will fall in love with someone close to her whom she never expected to, presumably to be her arch-rival Takaaki.

== To Heart 2 adplus ==
No.	Title	Original release date
1	"The First Errand"; Transliteration: "Hajimete no Otsukai" (Japanese: はじめてのおつかい)	April 24, 2009
The episode starts off with Takaaki sleeping when a new character, HMX-17c Silfa, wakes him up by stepping on his face. At breakfast, Takaaki realizes that they have run out of some things, so he tells Silfa to shop and that he would come with her after school, but Yuji scares her off. Takaaki goes by himself to shop and meets Harumi, who is in love with him.
2	"Summer Mood"; Transliteration: "Samā Mūdo" (Japanese: サマームード)	October 7, 2009
Maryaan organizes a swimsuit presentation competition with all of Takaaki's female friends participating.

== To Heart 2 adnext ==
No.	Title	Original release date
1	"First Name"; Transliteration: "Fāsuto Neimu" (Japanese: ファーストネイム)	September 23, 2010
Class rep Manaka frequently daydreams about her classmate Takaaki but at the same time is too shy to talk to boys in general. As Takaaki-kun helps her out in the school library they resolve to have training sessions there, calling each other by their first name when no one else can hear them. When Manaka one day addresses Takaaki-kun outside the library and his buddy Yuji (who overheard their conversation) tells everyone in their class how awfully close these two have become, this has a surprising effect on all the other girls around Takaaki.
2	"Trash Basket Memory"	December 22, 2010
Takashiro Yuuki was a childhood friend of Takaaki, but when her parents divorced she had to move and lost not only her friends but even her last name. Learning about this, Takaaki offered her she can have his name, and be Kouno Yuuki. Years later, this girl returns to her hometown, now named Kusakabe Yuuki. Takaaki now has his personal maid robot Harumi-chan who declared the boy her "darling" and tells everybody she will marry him. When Harumi learns about this childhood episode she considers Yuuki her rival and starts a series of competitions with her.

== To Heart 2: Dungeon Travelers ==
No.	Title	Original release date
1	"Total Disaster"; Transliteration: "Saiaku no Saiyaku" (Japanese: サイアクのサイヤク)	February 22, 2012
Due to Maryan's science experiment, the characters have been thrown into an RPG world, and must defeat the final boss to return to their normal lives.
2	"Treasure"; Transliteration: "Taisetsu na Mono" (Japanese: たいせつなもの)	July 25, 2012
The final boss is defeated, but the characters still haven't been freed from the game. According to Ilfa's advice, to leave the game, they need to find something black and shiny.
