= Banner of the Stars =

Japanese science fiction novel series by Hiroyuki Morioka

- Cover of Banner of the Stars I featuring main heroine Lafiel

星界の戦旗 (Seikai no Senki)
- Genre: Space opera, military science fiction
- Novel series
- Written by: Hiroyuki Morioka
- Illustrated by: Toshihiro Ono (first three volumes); Takami Akai (from volume four)
- Published by: Hayakawa Publishing
- English publisher: J-Novel Club
- Original run: December 1996 – present
- Volumes: 6
- Anime television series
- Directed by: Yasuchika Nagaoka
- Music by: Katsuhisa Hattori
- Studio: Sunrise
- Licensed by: NA: Bandai Entertainment (former) Funimation
- Original network: WOWOW
- English network: US: TechTV
- Original run: April 14, 2000 – July 14, 2000
- Episodes: 13
- Manga
- Written by: Toshihiro Ono (Banner of the Stars I); Wasoh Miyakoshi (Banner of the Stars II)
- Published by: Dengeki Comics
- English publisher: NA: Tokyopop
- Magazine: Monthly Comic Dengeki Daioh
- Original run: 2001 – 2002
- Volumes: 2
- Anime film

Banner of the Stars - Special Edition
- Directed by: Yasuchika Nagaoka
- Produced by: Korefumi Seki; Masaki Kaifu; Mikihiro Iwata; Riku Matsukawa
- Music by: Katsuhisa Hattori
- Studio: Bandai Visual; Sunrise
- Released: July 7, 2001
- Runtime: 120 minutes
- Anime television series

Banner of the Stars II
- Directed by: Yasuchika Nagaoka
- Music by: Katsuhisa Hattori
- Studio: Sunrise
- Licensed by: NA: Bandai Entertainment (former) Funimation
- Original network: WOWOW
- Original run: July 11, 2001 – September 26, 2001
- Episodes: 10
- Video game
- Developer: Gainax Network Systems
- Publisher: Gainax (PC); CyberFront (PS2)
- Genre: Strategy
- Platform: Windows, PlayStation 2
- Released: September 26, 2003 (PC); April 21, 2005 (PS2)
- Original video animation

Banner of the Stars III
- Directed by: Yasuchika Nagaoka
- Studio: Sunrise
- Licensed by: NA: Funimation
- Released: August 26, 2005 – September 23, 2005
- Runtime: 30-45 minutes
- Episodes: 2
- Related
- Crest of the Stars; Seikai no Danshō

Banner of the Stars (星界の戦旗, Seikai no Senki; lit. 'Battle Flag of the Stars') is a Japanese series of science fiction novels written by Hiroyuki Morioka, which serve as a sequel to Crest of the Stars. Three novels in the series have been adapted into anime. The first series, Banner of the Stars was released in 2000 with a recap movie Banner of the Stars Special Edition following in 2001. That year, Banner of the Stars II was also released. The third series, adapting the third novel, Banner of the Stars III is an OVA released in Japan in 2005.

== Characters ==
=== Main characters ===
Lin Shu Rock Yalulug Dril Hydal Jinto (リン・スューヌ・ロク・ヤルルーク・ドリュー・ハイダル・ジント, Rin Syūnu-Roku Yarurūku Doryū Haidaru Jinto; Linn ssynec Rocr Ïarlucec Dreuc Haïder Ghintec)
Voiced by: Yuka Imai (Japanese); Matthew Erickson (English)
After completing his training in military school, he joins Lafiel's crew as the supply officer of Basroil. He considers the ship his only home and even brings his cat Diaho aboard. He tries to conceal his friendship with the princess to prevent jealousy from amongst the crew. He is appointed as a deputy ambassador along with Lafiel several times. It is during the discharge of this duty that he almost lost his life. Although he succeeds in having his home planet Martine join the rest of Hyde Star System become part of the Abh Empire, he has to give up ever being able to set foot on its surface to show Lafiel how beautiful it is.
Abriel Nei Debrusc Borl Paryun Lafiel (Aburiaru Nei-Duburesuku Bēru Paryun Rafīru, Ablïarsec néïc Dubreuscr Bœrh Parhynr Lamhirh)
Voiced by: Ayako Kawasumi (Japanese); Jessica Yow (English)
After completing her apprenticeship, she becomes captain of Basroil. Diaho is her gift to Jinto before he left for military academy. She agrees to keep her friendship with him a secret but openly shows how much she cares for his well-being. She is appointed as ambassador several times. After Jinto is taken hostage and survives, she starts insisting to always keep him in sight going as far as taking leave from military service to accompany Jinto to the Hyde Star System. After surviving the destruction of the capital, Lafiel assumes her new role as the Crown Princess of the Empire.

=== Assault Ship Basroil ===
Aicryac Üémh Tlyzr Naurh
Basrogrh (Basroil) pilot who shows an interest in Jinto. She often serves as Diaho's sitter when Jinto is away.
Sobaash Üémh Dor Ïuth (ソバーシュ・ウェフ=ドール・ユース, Sobāshu u~efu = dōru yūsu)
Basroil's first navigator. He becomes captain of a new class of assault ship while Lafiel is on leave but gives up the post upon her return.
Samsonn Borgh Tiruser Tirusec
Basrogrh mechanic, a non-genetic Abh like Jinto who eventually becomes his first vassal.

=== Minor characters ===
Abriel Nei Debrusc Spunej Ramaj
The current reigning empress of the Abh Empire, she is also Lafiel's grandmother. She personally leads the defense during the attack on the capital. Empress Ramaj is voiced by Mika Doi in Japanese and Michelle Armeneau in English.
Abriel Nei Lamsar Larth Balkei Dusanyu
The current Dusanyu, or crown prince, of the Abh Empire of Mankind and the commander-in-chief of the Abh Armed Forces. Dusanyu is voiced by Kaneto Shiozawa in Japanese and Ethan Cole in English.
Abriel Nei Debrusc Larth Kryb Debeus
Lafiel's father, the King of Kryv and the Dusanyu's brother. He joins Abh fleet in the middle of the war and proceeds to the reclaim the Hyde Star System for the empire.
Abriel Nei Debrusc Duhiel
Lafiel's fifteen-year old younger brother who feels unable to measure up to his sister's accomplishments.
Trife Boli Yuvdale Remsale
Despite verging on excessive caution, he is nonetheless one of the most able tacticians in the Labule. Trife is voiced by Juurouta Kosugi in Japanese and Paul Boucher in English.
Spoor Aron Sekpadao Letopanyu Peneju
A high ranking noble and one of the most able admirals of the Abh Fleet. Though complaining of boredom most of the time, she suddenly springs into action when needed. Spoor is voiced by Rica Fukami in Japanese and Mariette Sluyter in English.
Atosryac Syun-Atos Lyuf Febdash Klowal Loïc
The fourth Baron of Febdash and Klowal's younger sister, Loïc is in command of a squadron of assault ships that included Basroil. She is a highly able commander.

== Media ==
=== Novels ===
There are currently six novels in the Banner of the Stars series, originally released by Hayakawa Publishing from December 1996. On April 20, 2019, J-Novel Club announced their license of Banner of the Stars, along with their retranslated release of Crest of the Stars. The digital release followed J-Novel Club's model of releasing "prepub" chapters on their website for premium members before the digital retail release on their site and other platforms like Amazon. The physical release for both series is in hardcover omnibus format, with three volumes per issue, with the first Banner of the Stars omnibus released on February 2, 2021, and the second on March 15, 2022.

- Banner of the Stars I "The Ties That Bind" (星界の戦旗I 絆のかたち) (Seikai no Senki I "Kizuna no Katachi") (1996)

Three years after the outbreak of hostilities between the Abh Empire and the Alliance, Lafiel becomes captain of the brand new assault ship Basroil. Jinto, who has finished his training, also joins her crew as a supply officer. They are attached to the imperial fleet assigned to defend the strategically important Laptic Gate from a force 15 times larger than their own. At the same time, their commanding officer, the younger sister of the third baron Febdash, the admiral of their fleet and his chief-of-staff are from the Bebaus family notoriously known for their "Spectacular Insanity".

- Banner of the Stars II "What Needs Defending" (星界の戦旗II 守るべきもの) (Seikai no Senki II "Mamoru Beki Mono") (1998)

Lafiel and Jinto are appointed ambassadors and given a mission to form a government on a newly conquered planet, which turns out to be a detention planet full of prisoners. Jinto is kidnapped during a rebellion and Lafiel is forced to withdraw due to the military actions of the enemy, leaving Jinto behind. Weeks later she returns to rescue him.

- Banner of the Stars III "Dinner With Family" (星界の戦旗III 家族の食卓) (Seikai no Senki III "Kazoku no Shokutaku") (2001)

The main characters go to the Hyde star system (Jinto's home world and recently recovered imperial territory). On the way, Jinto encounters his friend Dorin Ku and is informed that a military war game will be held in the Hyde star system. Martine, the system's capital, refuses to surrender to the Abh Empire. Count Jinto negotiates with the Martinese government and seeks terms of surrender. At last, at the cost of the planet's autonomy and exile of the Count, Martine joins the Empire.

- Banner of the Stars IV "The Screech of Space-Time" (星界の戦旗IV 軋む時空) (Seikai no Senki IV "Kishimu Jikuu") (2004)

The main characters have returned to the Imperial fleet and Lafiel is now captain of a new ship, the assault frigate Flicaubh. Lafiel's younger brother Duhiel enlists in the navy and is dispatched to a battleship. The so far neutral Hania Federation unexpectedly offers to join the Abh Empire and Empress Ramaj accepts. While Jinto and Lafiel are returning to the Imperial capital, Lakfakalle, the Hania Federation fleet suddenly attack the Abh Empire and advances towards the capital.

- Banner of the Stars V "Destiny's Refrain" (星界の戦旗V 宿命の調べ) (Seikai no Senki V "Shukumei no Shirabe") (2013)

The three enemy nations launch a surprise attack on Lakfakalle from Hania territory with help from sympathetic elements within the Hania military. Unable to recall the fleets in time to mount a defense, the empire prepares to abandon its capital for the first time in its history. The empress leads the small fleet available to meet the enemy in a desperate attempt to buy time for the civilians and crucial production structures to be evacuated. Meanwhile, Lafiel and Jinto are assigned to an old cruiser and tasked with transporting the Memorial Stones, markers etched with the name of every person who has ever died for the empire and important cultural artifacts. At the same time Duhiel is trapped behind enemy lines, and his superiors must get him back to Imperial territory.

- Banner of the Stars VI "Thunder of the Empire" (星界の戦旗VI 帝国の雷鳴) (Seikai no Senki VI "Teikoku no Raimei") (2018)

The war got stagnant for a long decade after the fall of Lakfakalle. Now the Empire is split in two, and both parts of it are undermanned and have problems with proper supplies. Both the Alliance and the Empire are slowly building their forces to break the stalemate which has occurred after the fall of Lakfakalle. Finally, the Empire is ready to initiate the operation "Thunder", launching their attack at People's Sovereign Union of Planets in order to reunite the shards of Imperial controlled space and, if possible, annex the territory and secure the resources of the Union. Lafiel, the Crown Princess, and, as required by the title, the Admiral of the Fleet, is ordered to complete this operation using the forces she helped to train and amass on her previous assignment during past decade. She has to handle the lack of supplies and not quite experienced crews while taking over a whole star nation, all while being overlooked by one of the Imperial Elders and tempted to go beyond the operational orders.

=== Anime ===
Banner of the Stars volume one "No Turning Back" region 1 DVD

Among fans, Banner of the Stars is a title used to describe all anime except Crest of the Stars (which Hiroyuki Morioka has said was not intended as the main idea of the story, but just an introduction to how Jinto and Lafiel met). Two TV series and an OVA have been released adapting the first three books. Bandai Entertainment released Banner of the Stars I and II seasons in North America in 2003, and in 2013 Funimation re-licensed the series and released them along with (subtitled-only) Banner of the Stars III in a 2018 DVD compilation. On December 25, 2019, Banner of the Stars along with Crest of The Stars was released on Blu-ray in Japan.

==== Banner of the Stars ====
No.	Title	Original release date
1	"Reunion"; Transliteration: "Saikai" (Japanese: 再会)	April 14, 2000
It has been three years since the outbreak of hostilities and a temporary ceasefire is about to end. Lafiel becomes captain of Basroil, from a new class of assault ships, and Jinto is appointed to her crew as a supply officer. They agree to keep familiarity from interfering with their duties to keep the crew from being jealous. Unfortunately for Basroil, it has not been doing well during simulation exercises. To avoid the risk of incurring the wrath of an Abriel, Chief mechanic Samsonn and the rest of the officers who are actually aware of his friendship with the princess assigns Jinto the task of bringing her self-confidence around to increase their chances of survival. At last, the Basroil joins the other assault ships on standby at the Vobeirunei Naval Station and Jinto renews his vow.
2	"Operation Phantom Flame"; Transliteration: "Gen'ensakusen" (Japanese: 幻炎作戦)	April 21, 2000
The Ahb Empire is planning out their next attack, and Lafiel and Jinto are naturally a part of it. Will this war be the worst yet?
3	"Assault Ship Basroil"; Transliteration: "Tsugekikan "Bāsuroiru"" (Japanese: 突撃艦"バースロイル")	April 28, 2000
Lafiel and Jinto are shocked when Atosuryua, the younger sister of the Baron whom Lafiel killed three years ago, becomes the commander of their battalion. However, this is only the least of their worries, as the battle is about to begin.
4	"The First Campaign"; Transliteration: "Uijin" (Japanese: 初陣)	May 5, 2000
Lafiel and Jinto are thrown right into the middle of a battle. Events trigger memories of the past that are best left forgotten. Will Lafiel and Jinto survive the first battle?
5	"Spectacular Insanity"; Transliteration: "Hanayakana Kyōki" (Japanese: 華やかな狂気)	May 12, 2000
The Basroil is in "spacedock" being repaired after the battle, and the crew are stocking up on supplies. Dusanyu, with the new information he has received, decides that the main battle will be held in the area surrounding the Aptic Gate. He appoints Admiral Bebaus' fleet in charge of defending the region. However, the Bebaus brothers come from a family known for "Spectacular Insanity." Everyone wonders if this will cause their doom. Meanwhile, as Jinto and Ekuryua are having a rather personal discussion, Lafiel comes into the room at precisely the wrong time and sees something that makes her very angry. Will Jinto be able to save face? And, what are the Bebaus brothers planning?
6	"Remembrance Dinner"; Transliteration: "Tomurainobansan" (Japanese: 弔いの晩餐)	May 19, 2000
At Atosuryua's request, Jinto and Lafiel join her for a dinner in honor of her late brother, Klowal. In a break from the wartime activity, Jinto and Lafiel don formal attire and fly off to the ritzy dinner Atosuryua has arranged. Indeed, this is the closest they've had to a date, but it is going to be a strange one. The dinner begins with a rocky start, as Lafiel is responsible for Klowal's death. Even worse, she doesn't really regret it. Will Atosuryua and Lafiel come to a reconciliation?
7	"Escape in the Dark"; Transliteration: "Kura Yami no Tōbō" (Japanese: くらやみの逃亡)	May 26, 2000
While on patrol, the Basroil and another assault ship, the Seigroil, are hit by enemy mines. They wind up adrift, stranded in "Plane Space". They have no sensors and systems begin failing throughout both ships. They soon come up with a plan to transfer all the crew and usable materials from the Seigroil to the Basroil, but once they do, the Basroil crew learns that the Seigroil bridge crew is trapped and cannot escape. Now, alone in the dark, the Basroil can see some unidentified ships coming toward them. But, are they friend or foe?
8	"The Eve of the Decisive Battle"; Transliteration: "Kessen Zen'ya" (Japanese: 決戦前夜)	June 2, 2000
It's the night before the big battle and everyone is doing what they need to do. Admiral Bebaus plans his defense but is distressed to learn he cannot pillage a local planet for supplies. He says that it's just too much of a bother. Meanwhile, Samson decides he needs to get really drunk. To his surprise, Sobaash joins him. They have a heart-to-heart talk. Elsewhere, Jinto and Ekuryua also have a heart-to-heart talk as well as a conversation about Diaho. Everyone is on edge as the battle draws near...
9	"The Basroil's Battle"; Transliteration: "Bāsuroiru Notatakai" (Japanese: バースロイルの戦い)	June 9, 2000
As they wait for the enemy fleet to arrive, Jinto and Lafiel discuss their lives and how they got to where they are today. Jinto confesses to being scared, and to his surprise, Lafiel admits that she is as well. They talk about their plans for the future. Will Jinto ever go back to his home planet, Martine? Will Lafiel become an admiral? What awaits the two in the upcoming battle? Lafiel says she has plans to go through all of life's three stages: officer, merchant, and parent. Jinto is surprised she has thought so far ahead. Their conversation is interrupted by the arrival of the enemy fleet and the beginning of the battle!
10	"Shooting Star"; Transliteration: "Nagareru Hoshi" (Japanese: 流れる星)	June 16, 2000
The Abh fleet command tries to determine the true nature of the enemy's new weapon. Unfortunately, it has taken a heavy toll on their forces and victory is no longer assured. Meanwhile, Admiral Spoor is en route to join the main fleet at Aptic for the battle. And, the Basroil enters its first true battle, but is the crew prepared for what they will see?
11	"The Flaming Battlefield"; Transliteration: "Shakunetsu no Senjō" (Japanese: 灼熱の戦場)	June 23, 2000
Lafiel is upset that they've been ordered to withdraw from the battle. She isn't used to losing or giving up. Her unit commander chastises her for questioning the chain of command. Later, Fleet Commander Dusanyu arrives in the Aptic Region intending to check in on Lafiel and Jinto. Meanwhile, on the Basroil, they are going into battle against enemy assault vessels. They seem to be doing well at first, as they manage to destroy a couple of enemy vessels. However, the Basroil is soon targeted. Will they survive?
12	"The Battle for Aptic Gate"; Transliteration: "Aputikkumon Oki Kaisen" (Japanese: アプティック門沖会戦)	June 30, 2000
As the battle for Aptic boils around them, the damaged Basroil is given permission to withdraw from the field of battle. Unfortunately, the damage is worse than originally estimated. Frustrated and angry, Lafiel gives the order for all hands to abandon ship. Meanwhile, on the main battlefield it appears that the enemy is trying to escape without engaging in further hostilities. Seeing this, Fleet Commander Dusanyu orders an attack. Admiral Spoor proceeds with her plan to cut a wide path through the enemy, demoralizing them in the process. Back on the Basroil, everyone has reached the escape vessels, except for Jinto. Lafiel goes to look for him. She eventually finds him, but before they can return to the others, there's an explosion!
13	"The Shape of Bonds"; Transliteration: "Kizuna no katachi" (Japanese: 絆のかたち)	July 14, 2000
Jinto and Lafiel float through space in an emergency escape pod, waiting for rescue. Elsewhere, the main fleet continues the battle, with Spoor's brutal advance confusing and disrupting the enemy forces. After the battle ends, Jinto and Lafiel are together aboard the naval base. As they make their way to see the new Basroil, they discuss the fate of Diaho, Jinto's cat. The new Basroil turns out to be exactly the same as the previous one. Unfortunately, since they have a new ship, they won't be going back into battle right away. With the crew back on board and ready to go, the new Basroil launches!

==== Banner of the Stars II ====
No.	Title	Original release date
1	"Operation Hunter"; Transliteration: "Kariudo Sakusen" (Japanese: 狩人作戦)	July 11, 2001
Lafiel and Jinto are given their roles as Territorial Ambassador and Territorial Deputy Ambassador and... they aren't exactly happy about it!
2	"Planet of Exile"; Transliteration: "Rukeinohoshi" (Japanese: 流刑の星)	July 18, 2001
The Basroil is contacted by all four ambassadors of Lobnas II: Geol Meideen, Yuuri Dokufu, Lala Shangal, and Mikay Angusson. Jinto is escorted down to Lobnas II after determining that Meideen should be the Territorial Representative. Meanwhile, Lafiel reminisces about the last conversation she had with Jinto before his departure.
3	"Emigration Plan"; Transliteration: "Imin Keikaku" (Japanese: 移民計画)	July 25, 2001
Plans for emigration are made. Some plans include whether or not the Territorial Ambassador should bring in more ships or if the Darksis (the ship transporting the inhabitants) should make more trips back and forth. Meanwhile, the women's sector is rallying for emigration rights so they won't be used as "cattle"
4	"The Hunters"; Transliteration: "Kariudo-tachi" (Japanese: 狩人たち)	August 1, 2001
All the ships in the surrounding area around Lobnas II have to retreat because of an enemy sighting. Elsewhere, Jinto is having problems reassuring Meideen and the rest of the evacuees so that they can return in order to continue emigrating those with permission off the planet. After the fact, while enjoying a sunset and thinking of Lafiel, Jinto receives a message that a rebellion has broken out!
5	"Rebellion"; Transliteration: "Pànluàn" (Japanese: 叛乱)	August 8, 2001
As the rebellion, started by Angusson and Dokufu, continues, Dokufu's section is able to take control of the administration section. Meideen, meanwhile, authorizes an immediate evacuation of the Western section (the women's section). Jinto decides to stay on the planet to ensure that all the Western section inhabitants are safely evacuated. However, while traveling to the Western section, Meideen and Jinto's vehicle is hijacked!
6	"Abh Hell"; Transliteration: "Āvu no Jigoku" (Japanese: アーヴの地獄)	August 15, 2001
After refusing to cancel the emigration order, Meideen is shot in the head and killed! Meanwhile, Angusson is threatened to be put in Abh Hell for threatening a fellow Abh's life (Jinto). Against Lafiel's heart's wishes, being an Abriel, Lafiel is forced to abandon Jinto on Lobnas II for the time being...
7	"The Flag of Gasarus"; Transliteration: "Kin'iro Karasu [Gasarusu] no Hata" (Japanese: 金色烏［ガサルス］の旗)	August 29, 2001
Angusson refuses to release Jinto because of his pride since he never backs down from a challenge. Dokufu, meanwhile, is killed because he doesn't want to suffer Abh Hell for Angusson's stupidity. Lafiel soon requests help from Spoor in order to carry out the emigration plan. Spoor rejects the offer at first but then agrees. Lafiel heads down to Lobnas II to assist in the emigration crisis.
8	"Things to Protect"; Transliteration: "Mamorubekimono" (Japanese: 守るべきもの)	September 12, 2001
Spoor tries to buy more time before having to go into battle. As the last of the women evacuees are boarding the transport ship, Spoor's fleet heads into battle with the enemy squadron. Meanwhile, Jinto awakens and heads outside seeing a ship preparing an emergency launch. He tries to flag it down, but he isn't noticed. Elsewhere, Angusson drowns as a tidal wave crashes into him from the force of the emergency launch.
9	"To Lay Down the Bow"; Transliteration: "Yumi o Oku Toki" (Japanese: 弓を置くとき)	September 19, 2001
Due to Spoor's assistance, the evacuation of Lobnas II is successfully completed! Unfortunately, out of Spoor's fleet of thirty-three ships, twenty-six were destroyed. Elsewhere, the crew of the Basroil reminisce about experiences they shared with Jinto, assuming the worst about him. Fighting to stay in order to see Lafiel again, Jinto thinks back to all the adventures he had with Lafiel from the time when they first met to the theme park chase on Sufugnoff...
10	"An Abriel's Tears"; Transliteration: "Aburiaru no Namida" (Japanese: アブリアルの涙)	September 26, 2001
Lafiel is still searching for Jinto on Lobnas II. While she is patiently waiting for Jinto to be found, Samson is preparing a meal for him. Jinto is found in a cave and Lafiel rushes to his side. She uses her endearing pet name for him, "Fool", and he calls her his "Precious little Princess." Lafiel and Jinto are then shown on a hill by a tree presumably on Jinto's home planet, Martine.

==== Banner of the Stars III ====
No.	Title	Original release date
1	"Reunion of the Stars"; Transliteration: "Meguriau Hoshi-Tachi" (Japanese: めぐりあう星たち)	August 26, 2005
Jinto temporarily leaves the navy and heads for the recently recovered Hyde Star System on a chartered passenger ship to set up an anti-matter fuel supply chain and establish his earldom. So she doesn't suffer the way she did in Lobnas II, Lafiel also leaves the navy so she could be with him. However, being naturally self-sufficient, planet Martine insists on remaining independent of the empire which is mainly focused on space exploration and interstellar trading. Lafiel points out that the factories are operated in space and need not require cooperation from the surface world. Worried about his finances and to prevent his plans from stalling, Jinto sends the chartered ship to monitor the situation in Martine while he proceeds to Delktou to recruit vassals to handle clerical duties of the anti-matter fuel factories. Meanwhile, Samsonn is in the imperial capital on Jinto's behalf to recruit technical and mechanical specialists. It is there that Seelnay's company finds him and offer their services. At the same time in the navy, as one of the captains of the new class of assault frigates, Sobaash attends the inauguration of the newly created 1st Infringement Fleet under Commander Atosryac. It is revealed that the fleet will eventually serve as a military training ground for members of the imperial family to ensure that the next ruler is an able military tactician and commander.
2	"Family Dining"; Transliteration: "Kazoku no Shokutaku" (Japanese: 家族の食卓)	September 23, 2005
The ship Jinto chartered was fired upon by the planet Martine, now accompanying the new Assault Frigate squadron back to the system he fears the exercise may be a cover story for a military assault. His attempts to ascertain the true purpose of the exercise and prevent a military retaliation are frustrated by no longer having military clearance. During the exercise the planet fired on the fleet and its planetary defences were destroyed however they gave warning to evacuate the facility first. Meeting the Prime Minister of the planet and his wife (Jinto's surrogate parents) to sign the surrender is a bittersweet experience, while offering family warmth they refuse to believe that he is not a hostage and plead with him to seek asylum. Jinto is forced to make a choice between surrendering his Abh identity and returning to the planet (with the belief his replacement as ruler may not be as compassionate) or retaining his title and living in permanent exile.

=== Radio drama ===
FM Osaka broadcast radio drama adaptations of Banner of the Stars novels and they were later released on CDs. The latest episode, Banner of the Stars IV, was broadcast in 2006, but has not been released on a CD.

=== Manga ===
One-volume manga adaptations of the Banner of the Stars and Banner of the Stars II anime series have been released by Dengeki Comics on October 27, 2001, and July 27, 2002, drawn by Toshihiro Ono and Wasoh Miyakoshi respectively, after they were serialized in Monthly Comic Dengeki Daioh magazine in 2001 and 2002. The manga volumes were released in English by Tokyopop on August 3 and October 12, 2004, under the names Seikai Trilogy, Vol. 2: Banner of the Stars: The Shape of Bonds and Seikai Trilogy, Vol. 3: Banner of the Stars II: Protecting the Precious. These volumes were referred to by Tokyopop as the second and third parts of the Seikai Trilogy. This was because at the time of publishing, only three anime series were adapted from Hiroyuki Morioka's works, and Banner of the Stars III was yet to be made. Crest of the Stars was considered the first part of the trilogy.

=== Video game ===
The Banner of the Stars series was adaptated into a Japanese video game for Windows. Named after the series, Gainax released it on September 26, 2003. It is a member of the wargame genre, featuring interactions with some characters from the novels in-between the battles. A port for the PlayStation 2 console was released on April 21, 2005.

== Reception ==
Banner of the Stars was nominated for the Grand Prize of the 1st Sense of Gender Awards in 2001.
