= List of Seikai characters =

This is an index of the characters of the novels, short stories and anime adaptations for Crest of the Stars, Banner of the Stars and Seikai no Danshō. In each entry, the first version of the name is from Tokyopop's licensed English translations of the manga and novels. In Bandai's licensed English version of the anime, the names are similar to Tokyopop's versions but not identical.

== Main protagonists ==
Abriel Nei Debrusc Borl Paryun Lafiel (アブリアル・ネイ=ドゥブレスク・ベール・パリュン・ラフィール, Aburiaru Nei-Duburesuku Bēru Paryun Rafīru; Ablïarsec néïc Dubreuscr Bœrh Parhynr Lamhirh)
Voiced by: Ayako Kawasumi (Japanese); Jessica Yow (English)
Lafiel is a strong-willed Abh princess. She is from the Clyuve Royal Family, in itself a member of the Abriel Imperial Family. As a granddaughter of the current Abh Empress Ramaj, she is in the line of succession to the throne. Despite being a princess, she rarely acts like one and hates being treated as one. One of the reasons Lafiel befriends Jinto is because Jinto neither recognizes her as a princess nor treats her as one when they first meet. Their relationship is so close that she freely allows him to use her real name of Lafiel when addressing her, something that is very uncommon when addressing those of nobility or royalty. She acts much older than her age (at her introduction in Crest of the Stars, she is 16 years old) and can, in most cases, logically think her way out of a situation. However, her headstrong nature sometimes clouds her judgment and can lead her to become impulsive. She is a very good shot and although she sometimes doubts herself, she proves to be a worthy ship captain (deca-commander) in Banner of the Stars. She shows little emotion throughout Crest of the Stars, but as time goes by became a very close friend with Jinto through Banner of the Stars. This is especially true in later installments, where she more frequently questions how their friendship will last due to the relative shortness of Jinto's lifespan.
Lin Shu Rock Yalulug Dril Hydal Jinto (リン・スューヌ・ロク・ヤルルーク・ドリュー・ハイダル・ジント, Rin Syūnu-Roku Yarurūku Doryū Haidaru Jinto; Linn ssynec Rocr Ïarlucec Dreuc Haïder Ghintec)
Voiced by: Yuka Imai (Japanese); Matthew Erickson (English)
Born Jinto Lin on planet Martine of the Hyde Star System, he is the son of Rock Lin, a politician who became president of the Hyde Star System. His mother was a mining engineer, who died in a mine accident soon after his birth. Because his father was busy with political activities, Jinto was brought up by his father's secretary, Teal Clint. When the Abh Empire invaded Hyde stellar system, his father surrendered the system in exchange for several concessions including selecting the territorial lord from amongst the people of Martine. As a result, Jinto rose to the ranks of Abh nobility along with his father. Growing up in a planet where he was considered the son of a traitor has not been easy for him. Even as he grew older, he would flinch at unfamiliar gestures. Jinto is eventually sent to the Planet Delktou to learn Baronh and Abh culture from Imperial citizens. Approximately seven years later, he leaves Delktou for a military college in Lakfakalle, the capital of the Abh Empire, to continue his education. It is in the spaceport of Delktou that he meets Lafiel who served as his escort and shuttle pilot from the spaceport to the patrolship Gosroth. The novels, and the anime, are a chronicle of the evolving personalities of the two, and their changing relationship with each other. He signs his name "Jint Linn".

== Abh ==
Rock Lin
Jinto's father. His formal name in Baronh was Linn ssynec Rocr Dreuc Haïder Roch. He was the head of government of the Hyde stellar system (Haïdec in Baronh) during the invasion of the Abh Empire. Believing his own ideas more valuable than the rights of the people of Martine, Rock Lin decides to surrender the stellar system but stipulated that the territorial lord of Hyde should be chosen from amongst the people of Martine. The leader of the invading forces agreed to this however this meant that an election could not be held making Rock, as the current leader of Martine, the natural choice to become its territorial lord. Because of the size of his domain, he is accepted into the Abh aristocracy as a great lord and conferred with the princely rank of Dreuc, equivalent to Count. His actions were interpreted by the people of Martine as treason. After the Four Nations Alliance took the planet from the Abh Empire, he was executed by the Hyde parliament despite the best efforts of his old friend Teal Clint, the new President.
Abriel Nei Lamsar Larth Balkei Dusanyu
The current Dusanyu, or Crown Prince, of the Abh Empire of Mankind, the Baronh name of which is Frybar Gloer Gor Bari (Frybarec Gloer Gor Bari), Also the Commander-in-Chief of the Abh Armed Forces, who personally led the invasion of the Hyde star system. Dusanyu is voiced by Kaneto Shiozawa in Japanese and Ethan Cole in English.
Lexshue Wef-Robell Plakia
The captain of the Gosroth, she is every bit as smart, beautiful, dedicated and stubborn as Lafiel, but older and wiser. Judging from her name, Lexshue's rank in the Abh social hierarchy is that of a reucec (knight or dame). She is allegedly Lafiel's mother, according to Lafiel herself. Lexshue is voiced by Gara Takashima in Japanese and Michelle Armeneau in English.
Abriel Nei Debrusc Larth Kryb Debeus
Lafiel's father, the King of Kryv and a son of the current reigning empress. He is somewhat impulsive and curious and is not above practical jokes. He once pranked his daughter into believing that half of her genes came from their pet cat.
Abriel Nei Debrusc Duhiel
Lafiel's younger brother, who is fifteen and in his first year at the Kenle. He was raised in the capital by his father and shown to feel inferior to his sister, who was already a Bene Rodail (officer-in-training) at his age.
Atosryua Syun-Atos Lyuf Febdash Klowal
The third Baron of Febdash, an obscure star system where Jinto and Lafiel made a stopover en route to Safugnoff (Sfagnaumh). He had an inferiority complex due to his clan's origins and brief history, causing him to confine and isolate his own father. He tried to abduct Lafiel and imprison Jinto, which brought dire consequences onto himself. Febdash is voiced by Takehito Koyasu in Japanese and Ethan Cole in English.
Atosryua Syun-Atos Lyuf Raika Febdash Srguf
The second Baron of Febdash and father of Klowal and Loïc. Srguf's mother was the first Baroness, who gained distinction by rising through the Imperial Star Force, or Labule (Laburec). Due to his being a genetic "grounder", his own son despised him resulting in confinement and isolation. He eventually befriended Jinto and aided Lafiel in "punishing" Klowal. His daughter, Loïc eventually became the Baroness of Febdash and a commanding officer to Lafiel and Jinto.
Atosryac Syun-Atos Lyuf Febdash Klowal Loïc
The fourth Baron of Febdash, Loïc served the Star Forces and attained the rank of Hecto-Commander, in command of a squadron of assault ships that included Lafiel's. Unlike her brother Klowal she had no desire to be in character of their family's territory and was unhappy to receive the duty. She got along well with her father and held no ill-will towards grounders unlike her brother, nor did she hold a grudge to Jinto and Lafiel for their role in what happened to Klowal, recognizing the events as a result of his actions. Loïc got along well and was respected by her subordinates, though she had some hesitance in contacting Lafiel on non-military matters due to her high noble rank, preferring to go through Jinto instead, and was a highly able commander.
Abriel Nei Debrusc Spunej Ramaj
The current reigning empress of the Abh Empire, she is also Lafiel's grandmother. She also holds the title "Dreuc Ablïarser" (Countess of Ablïarsec; Ablïarsec is also the name of the stellar system where Lakfakalle (Lacmhacarh), the imperial capital, is located). All interstellar ships belong to the crown which are then leased out to the merchants of the empire. Empress Ramaj is voiced by Mika Doi in Japanese and Michelle Armeneau in English.
Trife Boli Yuvdale Remsale
Despite verging on excessive caution, he is nonetheless one of the most able tacticians in the Labule. He puts every aspect and factor under consideration, frequently asking his subordinates' opinions and assessments before starting an operation. He is also one of the least loved officers. Trife is voiced by Juurouta Kosugi in Japanese and Paul Boucher in English.
Spoor Aron Sekpadao Letopanyu Peneju
This red-eyed officer from the Spoor clan is one of the most eccentric in the Labule, which does not change the fact that she is one of its most able admirals. Though complaining of boredom most of the time, she suddenly springs into action when needed. One of her favorite pastimes is mercilessly teasing Kaselia, her chief of staff. The Spoor family prides itself of being a close kin to the Abriel Imperial Family and the Spoor family consists of over five hundred titled members. As the Grand Duchess, she is heir to the Spoor legacy. Spoor is voiced by Rica Fukami in Japanese and Mariette Sluyter in English.
Kufadis
Spoor's lieutenant, who tries to restrain some of the more whimsical actions of his commanding officer. He is generally seen secretly moaning and groaning over his lot as Spoor's subordinate. Kufadis is voiced by Susumu Chiba in Japanese and Paul Hunter in English.
Aicryac Üémh Tlyzr Naurh
Basrogrh (Basroil) pilot who shows an interest in Jinto.
Sobaash Üémh Dor Ïuth (ソバーシュ・ウェフ=ドール・ユース)
Basrogrh first navigator
Samsonn Borgh Tiruser Tirusec
Basrogrh mechanic, a non-genetic Abh like Jinto who eventually becomes his first vassal.

== "Terrestrials"/Four Nations Alliance ==
Teal Clint
Rock Linn's best friend and clerk before the Abh invasion of the Hyde star system. He also became Jinto's foster father after Jinto's mother died and Rock Linn became too busy in politics to raise his own son. After Rock Linn's act of "high treason," Teal Clint became head of the anti-Abh resistance. When the Four Nations Alliance of the United Mankind and its allies helped the Hyde star system free itself from the Abh Empire, Teal Clint became the new President and reluctantly executed Rock Linn. Teal Clint is voiced by Eiichiro Suzuki in Japanese and Paul Boucher in English.
Dorin Ku
One of Jinto's friends during his early education on the planet Delktou. He was a fan of the game "minchiu" (minteau), a cross between soccer and roller derby, and played on the same local team as Jinto. He was the only person who came to say goodbye at the spaceport when Jinto was departing for the military academy at Lakfakalle. Dorin Ku is voiced by Taiki Matsuno.
Seelnay
A vassal of the Barony of Febdash who helped Jinto and Lafiel to escape from the clutches of Klowal. She later started her own ship-repair business with other former Febdash vassals. Seelnay is voiced by Ikue Ōtani in Japanese and Mariette Sluyter in English.
Inspector Entryua
Chief of the Police Department of Lune Biga, a city on Planet Clasbul in the Sufugnoff star system. He was forced to cooperate with the invading forces of the United Mankind to search for Jinto and Lafiel. Inspector Entryu is voiced by Unshō Ishizuka in Japanese and Doug McKeag in English.
Lt. Kyte
An Alliance military police officer from the United Mankind who led the search for Jinto and Lafiel in Sufugnoff. He belonged to the Silejia people who practiced genetic anti-aging manipulation before their annexation by the United Mankind; despite looking like a young man in his twenties, he is in reality around fifty years old. Because the United Mankind bans genetic manipulation, he is therefore much despised by most citizens of the United Mankind and is prevented from rising amongst the ranks of the military. This is one of the causes of his bitter hatred against the Abhs. He forced Entryua to accompany him and use local police resources in seeking for the Abh pair. Kyte is voiced by Michihiro Ikemizu in Japanese and Paul Boucher in English.
Marca
The head of an underground anti-empirialist (though not necessarily "anti-Abh") group of Clasbul seeking independence to run their own shipping, transportation, and trade. She acts as a hotel chambermaid and tries to kidnap Jinto and Lafiel to attain her group's goals. Eventually she helps the pair to flee Sufugnoff and escape the clutches of the United Mankind. For her assistance, as well as the legal requirement for ship owners to be ranking Abh nobles, she is raised to the rank of an Abh dame/equestrian (reucec). Marca is voiced by Yurika Hino in Japanese and Laura Bachynski in English.
Min Kulsup
A member of Marca's anti-imperialist group. He is also a previous member of the Independence Party which he left three years prior to the occupation of United Mankind. He is skillful in the production of arms a lot of which were alleged to have been found in his villa. Because of his history and line of work, he is suspected of possibly aiding the empire. Like Marca, he too became an Abh knight/equestrian at the end of Seikai no Monshō with the rest of Marca's group. Min is voiced by Ikkei Seta.
"The Undertaker"
The owner of the Clasbul funeral facility which was used to send Jinto and Lafiel back to space. His favorite story is about a guy who jumped unto thorn bushes. He too became an Abh knight/equestrian as a reward for aiding their escape. "The Undertaker" is voiced by Wataru Takagi in Japanese and David Pettitt in English.
Daswani
A big and silent man who is a member of Marca's anti-empirialist group. He too became an Abh knight/equestrian at the end of Seikai no Monshō with the rest of Marca's group. Daswani is voiced by Masato Amada.
Bill
Nicknamed "the Speeder," he is another member of Marcas's anti-empirialist group. He too became an Abh knight/equestrian at the end of Seikai no Monshō with the rest of Marca's group. Bill is voiced by Kenji Kuga in Japanese and Ethan Cole in English.
