= Crest of the Stars =

Series of science fiction novels by Hiroyuki Morioka

- Crest of the Stars I Japanese book cover

星界の紋章 (Seikai no Monshō)
- Genre: Space opera, military science fiction
- Serial novel
- Written by: Hiroyuki Morioka
- Illustrated by: Toshihiro Ono
- Published by: Hayakawa Publishing
- English publisher: NA: Tokyopop (former) J-Novel Club
- Original run: April 11, 1996 – June 11, 1996
- Volumes: 3
- Anime television series
- Directed by: Yasuchika Nagaoka
- Written by: Aya Yoshinaga
- Music by: Katsuhisa Hattori
- Studio: Sunrise
- Licensed by: AUS: Madman Entertainment; NA: Bandai Entertainment (former) Crunchyroll
- Original network: WOWOW
- Original run: January 2, 1999 – March 27, 1999
- Episodes: 13
- Manga
- Written by: Aya Yoshinaga
- Illustrated by: Toshihiro Ono
- Published by: Dengeki Comics
- English publisher: NA: Tokyopop
- Magazine: Monthly Comic Dengeki Daioh
- Original run: 1999 – 2000
- Volumes: 1
- Anime film

Crest of the Stars - Special Edition
- Directed by: Yasuchika Nagaoka
- Produced by: Korefumi Seki; Masaki Kaifu; Mikihiro Iwata; Tsutomu Sugita
- Music by: Katsuhisa Hattori
- Studio: Sunrise
- Released: April 7, 2000
- Runtime: 90 minutes
- Video game
- Developer: NineLives
- Publisher: Bandai Visual
- Genre: Strategy
- Platform: PlayStation
- Released: May 25, 2000
- Manga
- Written by: Kōichirō Yonemura
- Published by: Flex Comix
- Magazine: FlexComix Next (2012); Comic Meteor (2012–2021)
- Original run: May 8, 2012 – April 28, 2021
- Volumes: 8
- Related
- Banner of the Stars; Seikai no Danshō

Crest of the Stars (Japanese: 星界の紋章, Hepburn: Seikai no Monshō) is a three-volume space opera science fiction novel written by Hiroyuki Morioka with cover illustrations by Toshihiro Ono. This was followed by a second, ongoing novel series, Banner of the Stars (a.k.a. Seikai no Senki, currently six volumes) and a series of books collecting short stories set in the same universe known as Fragments of the Stars (星界の断章, Seikai no Danshō).

Beginning in 1999, the novels were adapted into anime and manga series, the first of which ran for 13 episodes on WOWOW. A recap movie, Crest of the Stars Special Edition, was also released in 2000.

== Plot ==
Crest of the Stars chronicles how Jinto met Lafiel and the events that followed before the war.

When Jinto was a young boy, his world is invaded by the Abh empire. His father who was then president of the Hyde Star System, surrendered the system and earned for himself and his family a nobility within Abh society. Young Jinto is sent off to school in planet Delktou to learn the ways of Abh nobility and the story of Crest of the Stars picks up as he meets the young Abh princess, Lafiel who as a pilot trainee has been assigned to escort him to the patrol ship Gothlauth, a.k.a. Gosroth). Soon, they find themselves unready participants in the incident that would ignite the war between the Abh Empire and the Four Nations Alliance of Humankind — an anti-Abh alliance of the democratic nations of the United Mankind, the Federation of Hania, the Republic of Greater Alcont, and the People's Sovereign Union of Planets.

== Characters ==
=== Main characters ===
Lin Shu Rock Yalulug Dril Hydal Jinto (リン・スューヌ・ロク・ヤルルーク・ドリュー・ハイダル・ジント, Rin Syūnu-Roku Yarurūku Doryū Haidaru Jinto; Linn ssynec Rocr Ïarlucec Dreuc Haïder Ghintec)
Voiced by: Yuka Imai (Japanese); Matthew Erickson (English)
Years after his father surrendered the Hyde Star System to the Abh Empire, Jinto is on his way to the capital to attend military school in preparation for claiming his title and succeeding his father as the next territorial lord. He befriends Lafiel not knowing that she is royalty. Although completely unused to life in space, he is quite dependable when on a planet surface.
Abriel Nei Debrusc Borl Paryun Lafiel (アブリアル・ネイ=ドゥブレスク・ベール・パリュン・ラフィール, Aburiaru Nei-Duburesuku Bēru Paryun Rafīru; Ablïarsec néïc Dubreuscr Bœrh Parhynr Lamhirh)
Voiced by: Ayako Kawasumi (Japanese); Jessica Yow (English)
Lafiel is the pilot trainee assigned to escort Jinto from the spaceport of Delktou to the patrol ship Gosroth. Although she is a member of the Abriel Imperial Family, she befriends him and allows him to call her by her name. As a space-dweller, she is somehow clueless of life in the surface world. She is self-sacrificing and strong-willed but eventually begins to have more faith in Jinto. She is a very good shot.

=== Minor characters ===
Lexshue Wef-Robell Plakia
The captain of the patrol ship Gosroth, she decides to send Jinto and Lafiel to Sufugnoff once it is confirmed that the ship is about to be attacked. Lexshue is voiced by Gara Takashima in Japanese and Michelle Armeneau in English.
Atosryua Syun-Atos Lyuf Febdash Klowal
The third Baron of Febdash, an obscure star system where Jinto and Lafiel made a stopover en route to Sufugnoff (Sfagnaumh). He is ambitious and at the same time embarrassed of his heritage. He tried to detain Lafiel and imprison Jinto, which brought dire consequences onto himself. Febdash is voiced by Takehito Koyasu in Japanese and Ethan Cole in English.
Atosryua Syun-Atos Lyuf Raika Febdash Srguf
The second Baron of Febdash and father of Klowal and Loïc. Due to his being a genetic "grounder," his own son despised him resulting in confinement and isolation. He became friends with Jinto and aided Lafiel in "punishing" Klowal.
Seelnay
A vassal of the Barony of Febdash who helped Lafiel take over the control room of the baron's mansion. Seelnay is voiced by Ikue Ōtani in Japanese and Mariette Sluyter in English.
Inspector Entryua
Chief of the Police Department of Lune Biga, a city on Planet Clasbul in the Sufugnoff Star System. He is forced to cooperate with the invading forces of the United Mankind to search for Jinto and Lafiel. Inspector Entryu is voiced by in Japanese and Doug McKeag in English.
Lt. Kyte
An Alliance military police officer from the United Mankind who led the search for Jinto and Lafiel in Clasbul. Because he is also genetically engineered, he is despised by most citizens of the United Mankind and is prevented from rising amongst the ranks of the military. This results in deep hatred against the Abh. Kyte is voiced by Michihiro Ikemizu in Japanese and Paul Boucher in English.
Anti-imperialist group of Clasbul
Though not necessarily "anti-Abh", it is a group seeking freedom to run their own shipping, transportation, and trade. They help the pair to flee Sufugnoff and escape the clutches of the United Mankind. For their assistance, as well as to meet the legal requirement for ship leasees to be ranking Abh nobles, they are raised to the rank of an Abh dame/equestrian (reucec).

== Development ==
The series is notable for Morioka's creation of an entire language, Baronh, and an accompanying alphabet, Ath, used by the Abh. Almost all written text in the anime is in Baronh, with occasional text in other invented languages; at least one planet is shown to have adopted Ath to write their own language.

== Media ==
=== Books ===
Despite being commonly dubbed as a trilogy, the work is actually a three-volume novel. The three volumes were originally released by Hayakawa Publishing from April to June 1996.

The novel volumes were translated and released in English in softcover format by Tokyopop in 2006 and 2007.

On April 20, 2019, J-Novel Club announced they had licensed both Crest of the Stars and Banner of the Stars for digital and physical release. The J-Novel Club version of Crest of the Stars features a new translation. The digital release followed J-Novel Club's model of releasing "prepub" chapters on their website for premium members before the digital retail release on their site and other platforms like Amazon. The physical release for both series is in hardcover omnibus format, with three volumes per issue, with Crest of the Stars released on March 3, 2020.

- Crest of the Stars I "Princess of the Empire" / "The Imperial Princess" (星界の紋章I 帝国の王女) (Seikai no Monshō I "Teikoku no Ōjo") (Released September 6, 2006 in U.S. by Tokyopop / June 9, 2019 by J-Novel Club (digital))
- Crest of the Stars II "A Modest War" / "A War Most Modest" (星界の紋章II ささやかな戦い) (Seikai no Monshō II "Sasayaka na Tatakai") (Released January 9, 2007 in U.S. by Tokyopop / August 10, 2019 by J-Novel Club (digital))
- Crest of the Stars III "Return to a Strange World" / "The Return to Strange Skies" (星界の紋章III 異郷への帰還) (Seikai no Monshō III "Ikyō e no Kikan") (Released May 8, 2007 in U.S. by Tokyopop / October 12, 2019 by J-Novel Club (digital))

=== Anime ===
Crest of the Stars volume one "To The Stars" region 1 DVD

Crest of the Stars was released in Japan in 1999 and in the United States by Bandai in 2001. At the end of 2002, TechTV announced that Crest of the Stars was to be one of the initial titles as part of their new Anime Unleashed programming and began broadcast at the end of 2002 and through 2003. Following the closure of Bandai Entertainment in 2012, Sunrise announced at Otakon 2013, that Funimation had licensed Crest of the Stars, Banner of the Stars I and II and Passage of the Stars. On December 25, 2019, Crest of The Stars and its sequel series Banner of the Stars were released on Blu-ray in Japan.

No.	Title	Original air date	U.S. air date
1	"Invasion"; Transliteration: "Shinryaku" (Japanese: 侵略)	January 2, 1999	December 31, 2002
The ever-expanding Abh Empire of Mankind, led by the Dusanyo, invades the Hyde Star System. It becomes clear that direct governance of the surface world is not part of their plans. So in exchange for allowing its citizens the right to freely travel to other star systems as well as elect the territorial lord from amongst themselves, Rock Lynn who was then the president surrenders their sovereignty. But he did not consult his immediate subordinates, not even his friend and executive secretary Teal Clint who also served as surrogate parent for his son. And so, although he earned an Abh nobility for his family, he left everyone else feel betrayed. Years later, having spent several years in the planet Delktoe learning to read and write in Baronh, the Abh language, Jinto takes up his status as a noble and is on his way to the capital to attend military school.
2	"Kin of the Stars"; Transliteration: "Hoshi Tachino Kenzoku" (Japanese: 星たちの眷族)	January 9, 1999	January 1, 2003
Dorin Ku is the only friend from Delktou who shows up to see Jinto off at the space port while his other friends opted on just sending him a goodbye present. Soon, Jinto's escort arrives - a serious young Abh who suddenly warms up to him when he asks for her name. She delightedly tells him to call her Lafiel and proudly considers herself as a "Kin of the stars". Jinto takes the opportunity to fill the gaps in his "Lander" knowledge by asking her questions.
3	"Daughter of Love"; Transliteration: "Ai no Musume" (Japanese: 愛の娘)	January 16, 1999	January 2, 2003
Jinto and Lafiel arrives at the patrol ship Gosroth, the most advanced ship of the empire which has been tasked to convey him to the capital, under the command of Captain Lexshue. Still unused to his newly assumed social status, he tries his best to behave as expected of the nobility. To his deep embarrassment, Jinto soon finds out that the pilot trainee who escorted him is actually the granddaughter of the Empress. An awkward conversation with Lafiel then follows but it results in them knowing more about each other. Lafiel even shares her birth secret with him.
4	"Surprise Attack"; Transliteration: "Kishū" (Japanese: 奇襲)	January 23, 1999	January 4, 2003
Five days into the journey, while Jinto struggles with the supply officer modules, unidentified space clusters show up on the ship monitor. It is soon determined that they originated from the nearby Vascotton System, a known territory of United Mankind from the Four Nations Alliance against the Abh Empire. Lately, the Alliance has been stirring up anti-Abh sentiments in the already volatile Hyde Star System. Because battle was imminent, the Captain Lexshue decides to remove non-combatants from the ship. Lafiel receives a sharp rebuke from the captain after she insisted to remain. The captain gives Jinto a couple of pistols before sending them away to warn the communications base at Sufugnoff.
5	"The Battle of Gosroth"; Transliteration: "Gousurosu no Tatakai" (Japanese: ゴースロスの戦い)	January 30, 1999	January 4, 2003
Gosroth receives a challenge to battle from the oncoming ships. Although the chances of winning were extremely low, and in spite of being low on firepower, Gosroth engages the enemy in self defense. And thus ignites a war that would last for many years and cost thousands of lives and resources. Meanwhile, Jinto tries his best to comfort Lafiel and take her mind off things. Still quite anxious about Gosroth's fate, Lafiel shares with Jinto the role of the captain in her birth secret.
6	"Mysterious Conspiracy"; Transliteration: "Fukakai na Inbou" (Japanese: 不可解な陰謀)	February 6, 1999	January 4, 2003
Jinto and Lafiel reach Baron Febdash Territory to refuel before they proceed to Sufugnoff. The glaring difference in how she is treated, and the ill-concealed contempt towards Jinto provokes the ire of the Abh Princess. How the vassals, all of whom were females, behaved like mere body slaves did not help her temper either. Through veiled threats and direct admissions, it becomes evident that Klowal, the third baron of Febdash, intends to detain her to ensure that the empire preserves his domain in case the enemy discovers its existence. Because the territory and his nobility is fairly new and insignificant compared to the thousands of systems within the empire, it is a cause of embarrassment and frustration for its young and ambitious new baron.
7	"Fortunate Revolt"; Transliteration: "Shiawase na Hangyaku" (Japanese: 幸せな反逆)	February 13, 1999	January 4, 2003
Jinto regains consciousness inside a big chamber occupied by an elderly man, who introduces himself as Srguf. The elderly man turns out to be the second baron and Klowal's father, hidden away by his son who was embarrassed of his Lander heritage. While the young baron was busy scheming about how to use the princess in order to have his own micronation, Lafiel figures out where Jinto is confined and takes over the control room with the help of Seelnay, the vassal assigned to her. Meanwhile, the elder baron expresses his amusement at Jinto's being on a first-name basis with the Abh princess.
8	"The Style of the Abh"; Transliteration: "Aavu no Ryūgi" (Japanese: アーヴの流儀)	February 20, 1999	January 4, 2003
Lafiel leaves to refuel the shuttle but the baron blows up the fuel stations. With the fuel stations gone, Lafiel focuses instead on extracting Jinto and the elder baron from their confinement through a daring rescue. With the elder baron's help they refuel through one of the factories before proceeding to engage and punish the delusional baron for obstructing her mission to Sufugnoff. Although the baron has also launched an offensive of his own, he is no match for Lafiel who delivers a decisive blow. The elder baron resumes his previous duties and bids Jinto and Lafiel farewell.
9	"To the Battlefield"; Transliteration: "Senjou He" (Japanese: 戦場へ)	February 27, 1999	January 11, 2003
After breaking through a blockade of hostile ships, Jinto and Lafiel arrives at Sufugnoff and informs the communication base of the attack on Gosroth. Because the forces from United Mankind had blown up the orbiting towers, the princess agrees to land on the planet Clasbul after a brief discussion on which plan was feasible under the current circumstances. It was the princess' first time to set foot on a planet surface so it was now Jinto's turn to guide her as they make their way through fields of grain in the middle of nowhere. Elsewhere, in the Abh capital, ambassadors from the Four Nations Alliance arrive to lodge a complaint against an attack on their ships during a space survey. Seeing through their lies and having faith in the conduct of Abh officers, the Empress Ramaj accepts the declaration of war.
10	"Escape: Just the Two of Us"; Transliteration: "Futari Dakeno Toubou" (Japanese: 二人だけの逃亡)	March 6, 1999	January 11, 2003
A short distance from Sufugnoff, in the Yunyu Star System, Admiral Trife of the Abh Fleet and his commanders assess the enemy's strength using available data but the result is too inconclusive for the ever-cautious admiral to make a decision. Meanwhile, in Sufugnoff, Jinto convinces Lafiel that they need to enter the city of Lune Biga so they could resupply and have better living arrangements. But first, Jinto has to find a good disguise for them to enter the city amidst the United Mankind occupation. He also has to deal with Lafiel's self-sacrificial attitude. Elsewhere in the police headquarters, Inspector Entryua is unhappy of the occupation army meddling with local police affairs. He is paired off with Lt. Kyte, an Alliance military police officer from the United Mankind who is after a couple of individuals. And thus begins the manhunt for Jinto and Lafiel.
11	"Sufugnoff Gateway Battle"; Transliteration: "Sufagunoufu Mon Oki Kaisen" (Japanese: スファグノーフ門沖海戦)	March 13, 1999	January 11, 2003
The forces of United Mankind does not retreat from the Sufugnoff space in spite of the Abh fleet show of force. On the surface world, the manhunt for Jinto and Lafiel is complicated by the presence of the occupation army who are after the survivors of the ship they attacked and destroyed. Meanwhile, men in police uniform enter Jinto and Lafiel's apartment but in a quick turn of events, they are disarmed by Lafiel and at gunpoint introduce themselves as a group of freedom fighters seeking to claim trading and exploration rights in space. Lafiel agrees to be a hostage but in her own terms and conditions. Back in space, the Abh fleet commences the attack to reclaim the Sufugnoff space.
12	"Lady of Chaos"; Transliteration: "Waku Ran no Shukujo" (Japanese: 惑乱の淑女)	March 20, 1999	January 11, 2003
The attack on the United Mankind forces is underway led by Rear Admiral Spoor who alternates between the offensive and antagonizing her chief-of-staff. On the surface world, Inspector Entryua's officers locate Jinto and Lafiel's hotel but it is already empty. Up in the mountains, on the way to a hideout, Marca - the leader of the anti-imperialist group - explain to Jinto and Lafiel that they need a spaceship so they could be free. Lafiel explains the existing regulations regarding interstellar ships which does not sit well with their plans. Roving units of the United Mankind army also locates them before they reach Min's villa. Working together amidst heavy firefighting, they make their escape underground and go their separate ways to evade capture. Back in space, the Abh navy overwhelms and routs the enemy and reclaim the Suffugnoff space even as the remaining forces make a last-ditch attempt to escape.
13	"Trouble Soaring Through Heaven"; Transliteration: "Ten Kakeru Meiwaku" (Japanese: 天翔ける迷惑)	March 27, 1999	January 18, 2003
Jinto and Lafiel arrive at the Guzunyu Fantasy Park which is being evacuated. Their escape is impeded by robotic mascots but it also prevents the pursuing personnel from easily reaching them. With two hostile parties on all sides, Jinto and Lafiel do their best to survive. With Lafiel having more faith in him, they make their way to the exit but find the local police waiting for them. Lt. Kyte's near-fanatical bitterness toward the Abh changes their decision to surrender. They are rescued by Marca's group who has discerned Lafiel's true identity because of her Abriel ears. Having obtained Lafiel's promise to put in a good word for the group's cause to the Empress, "The Undertaker" sends them back to space through the funeral facility. For the first time, Jinto promises Lafiel that he will stay by her side until the time he is sent off again to space in a coffin. Their coffin is rescued by Rear Admiral Spoor's men and they finally make it to the capital where the news of Gosroth's demise awaited them. While Lafiel learns more about how her mother lived, Jinto receives news of his father's execution after the Hyde Star System joined the coalition against the Abh Empire. With no more family and home to call his own, Jinto reaffirms his resolve to remain at Lafiel's side for the rest of his natural life.

=== Radio drama ===
Radio drama adaptation was broadcast on FM Osaka, and has been released as CDs in three volumes. The cast is practically the same as the anime version, but with some changes.

=== Manga ===
Dengeki Comics released a one-volume manga adaptation of the novel on March 27, 2000, after serializing it in Monthly Comic Dengeki Daioh magazine in 1999. The manga was illustrated by Toshihiro Ono and written by Aya Yoshinaga, who has also written the anime adaptation. Hiroyuki Morioka is also credited on the cover as the original creator. Much like the anime series, it covers all three volumes. It was licensed by Tokyopop and released on June 8, 2004, under the name Seikai Trilogy, Vol. 1: Crest of the Stars, dubbed the first part of the Seikai Trilogy, since two other companion manga were also released, adapting Banner of the Stars I and II.

The first chapter of a new web manga adaptation of Crest of the Stars by Kōichirō Yonemura was published by Flex Comix in volume five of Nico Nico FlexComix Next digital magazine released on May 8, 2012 and on FlexComix Next site on May 22; the manga was transferred to Comic Meteor on September 5. The last chapter was released online on April 28, 2021. The first print volume of the manga went on sale on May 11, 2013 and the eighth and last was released on April 12, 2021. Both were released digitally three days earlier.

=== Video game ===
Roughly a year after the anime finished airing, on May 25, 2000 Bandai Visual released a video game adaptation for the PlayStation. It features a story inspired by both the Crest of the Stars and the Banner of the Stars novels, incorporating some of their characters. The game consists of 67 different space battles, with a story split in two paths with three possible endings each.

== Reception ==
=== Novels ===
In 1996, the world of Japanese science fiction novels was in a slump. Many people considered the genre dead to such an extent that authors avoided it. The appearance of the Crest of the Stars novel was not only a surprise but also earned it the Seiun Award.

=== Anime ===
In The Encyclopedia of Science Fiction, the show is described as centered around the evolving partnership – evoking the trope of "not officially a romance" – of its two main protagnonists. Themes tackled include cultural Identity, loyalty versus duty, communication across cultural divides, the tension between personal choice and political obligation, and exploration of whether good governance derives from institutions or from individuals. The entry notes that the show is notable for its thorough worldbuilding and cultural clash of empire versus democracy, subverting expectations that the Galactic Empire must be evil and the rebels virtuous. The entry concludes that "Arguably underrated, it stands as one of anime's most thoughtful explorations of Military SF and Space Opera".
