= Ayako Kawasumi =

Japanese voice actress and singer (born 1976)

- 川澄 綾子
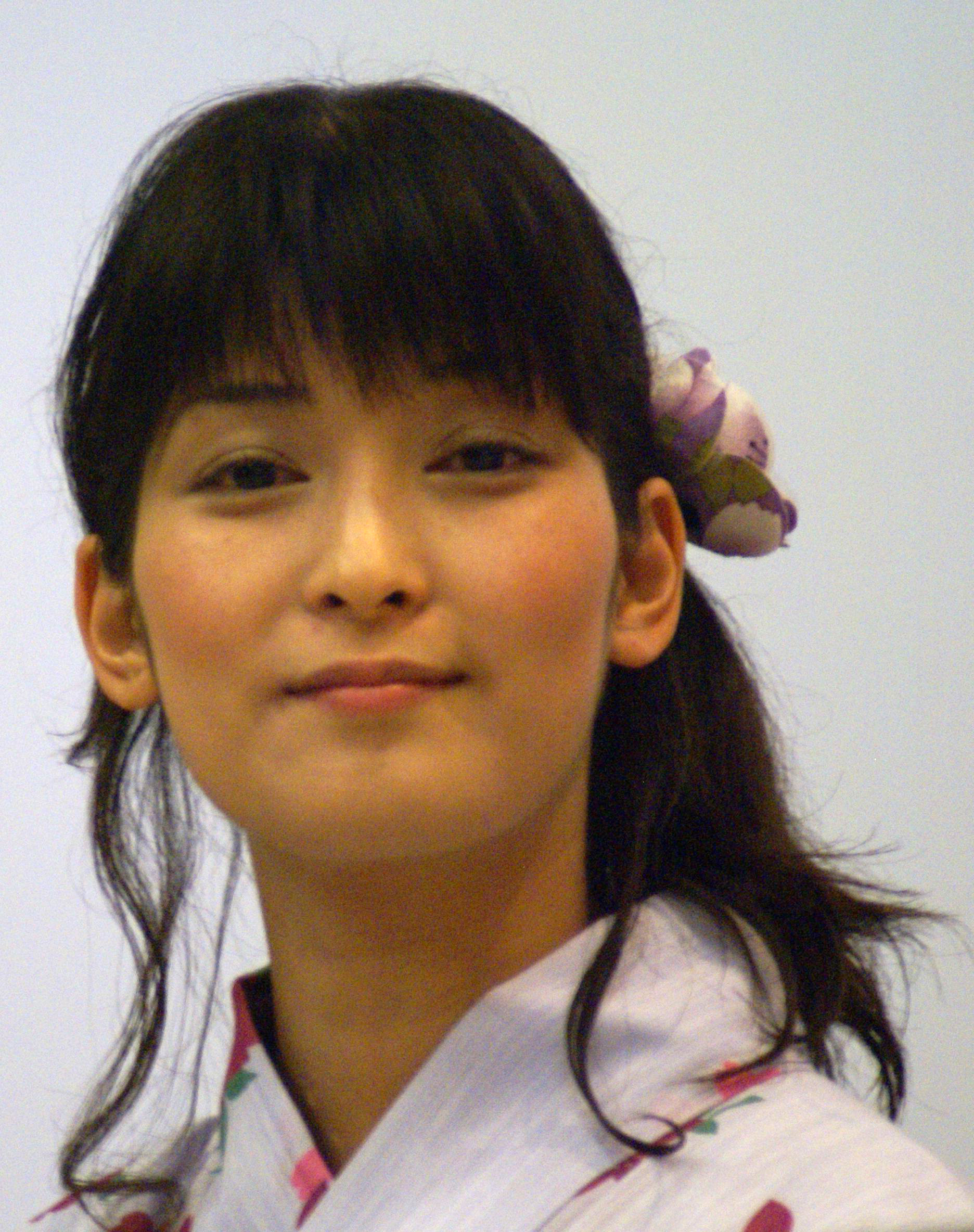
- Kawasumi at the 2006 Otakon convention
- Born: March 30, 1976 (age 50); Tokyo, Japan
- Occupations: Voice actress; singer
- Years active: 1997–present
- Agent: Office Osawa

Ayako Kawasumi (川澄 綾子, Kawasumi Ayako; born March 30, 1976) is a Japanese voice actress and singer. She is affectionately referred to by her fellow voice actors and fans as "Ayachii (あやちー)", "Peyaya (ペヤヤ, Peyaya)","Ayasumi (あやすみ)" and "Aya-nē (あやねえ)". She is a skilled pianist as she has played the piano since childhood. She performed "...To You", the opening theme to Piano, and played pianists in the anime Piano and Nodame Cantabile. She is one of the most prolific and well-known voice actresses in Japan. Throughout her career, she has voiced plenty of iconic and famous characters, such as Akari Kamigishi (To Heart), Saber (Fate), Elie (Rave Master), Melfina (Outlaw Star), Nodame (Nodame Cantabile), Lafiel (Crest of the Stars – Banner of the Stars), Fuu (Samurai Champloo), Leina (Queen's Blade), Aoi Sakuraba (Ai Yori Aoshi), Mahoro (Mahoromatic), Shenhe (Genshin Impact), and Natsuki Mogi (Initial D).

== Filmography ==
=== Television animation ===
==== 1997 ====
- You're Under Arrest – Female officer (episode 33)

==== 1998 ====
- Outlaw Star – Melfina
- B Bidaman Bakugaiden V
- Dokkiri Doctor – Hideko Ikeda and Shoku
- DT Eightron – Fia
- Guardian Angel Getten – Rishu
- Initial D – Natsuki Mogi
- Neo Ranga – Aya
- Princess Nine – Azuma Yuki
- Serial Experiments Lain – Mika Iwakura
- Weiß Kreuz – Sayaka

==== 1999 ====
- AD Police: To Serve and Protect – Kyoko Miyano
- Black Heaven – Rinko
- Crayon Shin-chan – Ai Suotome (starting with episode 339)
- Crest of the Stars – Lafiel
- Great Teacher Onizuka – Nomura Tomoko & Naoko Izumi
- Hoshin Engi – Shinyou
- I'm Gonna Be An Angel! – Sara
- Initial D Second Stage – Natsuki Mogi
- Seraphim Call: Kurumi Matsumoto
- To Heart – Akari Kamigishi

==== 2000 ====
- Argento Soma – Operator
- Banner of the Stars – Lafiel
- The Candidate for Goddess – Kazuhi Hikura
- Ceres, The Celestial Legend – Chidori Kuruma
- Gate Keepers – Ruriko Ikusawa
- Ghost Stories – Hanako
- Mon Colle Knights – Water Angel
- NieA 7 – Mayuko Chigasaki

==== 2001 ====
- Angel Tales – Turtle Ayumi
- Angelic Layer – Kaede Saito
- Banner of the Stars II – Lafiel
- Comic Party – Akari (cameo)
- Gene Shaft – Dolce Saito and Chacha
- Great Dangaioh – Manami Mishio
- Rave Master – Elie
- Mahoromatic – Mahoro Andō
- Muteki Ō Tri-Zenon – Kurara
- Sister Princess – Chikage
- Zoids: New Century Zero – Rinon (Leena) Toros

==== 2002 ====
- Ai Yori Aoshi – Aoi Sakuraba
- Kanon – Kaori Misaka
- Mahoromatic: Something More Beautiful – Mahoro Andō
- Petite Princess Yucie – Elmina
- Piano – Nomura Miu
- Please Teacher! – Koishi Herikawa
- RahXephon – Megumi Shito
- Sister Princess RePure – Chikage
- Tokyo Underground – Jilherts Mesett
- Tokyo Mew Mew – Jacqueline

==== 2003 ====
- .hack//Legend of the Twilight – Hotaru
- Ai Yori Aoshi Enishi – Aoi Sakuraba
- Angel Tales 2 – Turtle Ayumi
- E's Otherwise – Ruri
- Mahoromatic: Summer Special – Mahoro Andō
- Please Twins! – Koishi Herikawa
- Popotan – Unagi
- Scrapped Princess – Winia Chester

==== 2004 ====
- Genshiken: Kanako Ohno
- Girls Bravo – Miharu Sena Kanaka
- Initial D Fourth Stage – Natsuki Mogi
- Kannazuki no Miko – Chikane Himemiya
- Kujibiki Unbalance – Kasumi Kisaragi
- Kurau Phantom Memory – Kurau Amami
- Ninin Ga Shinobuden – Kaede
- Samurai Champloo – Fuu
- This Ugly Yet Beautiful World – Hikari
- To Heart: Remember My Memories – Akari Kamigishi, Hikari Kamigishi (ep. 12)

==== 2005 ====
- Atashin'chi – Emiko
- Banner of the Stars III – Lafiel
- Best Student Council – Sayuri Hida
- Black Jack – Michiru
- Bludgeoning Angel Dokuro-Chan – Shizuki Minakami
- Canvas 2 ~Niji Iro no Sketch~ – Anna Housen (episode 10)
- Fushigiboshi no Futagohime – Elsa
- Gallery Fake – Sara Harifa
- Girls Bravo Second Season – Miharu Sena Kanaka
- Ginban Kaleidoscope – Tazusa Sakurano
- Gunparade Orchestra – Sakaki Rimei
- He Is My Master – Takami Sugita
- Hell Girl – Misato Urano (episode 5)
- Kyo Kara Maoh! – Ondine
- Oku-sama wa Joshi Kōsei (My Wife is a High School Girl) – Asami Onohara
- Onegai My Melody – Miki's Mother
- Petopeto-san – Kanna Maeda
- Shakugan no Shana – Kazumi Yoshida
- Starship Operators – Rio Mamiya
- Strawberry Marshmallow – Matsuri Sakuragi
- The King of Braves GaoGaiGar Final – Papillon Noir
- The Snow Queen – Gerda
- Trinity Blood – Catherina (10 years old)

==== 2006 ====
- Angel Heart – Yume
- Fate/stay night – Saber/Arturia Pendragon
- Fushigiboshi no Futagohime Gyu! – Elsa
- .hack//Roots – Wool
- Kanon – Kaori Misaka
- Kujibiki Unbalance – Kanako Ohno (preview narration)
- Lovely Idol – Aya Hiwatari
- Sōkō no Strain – Sara Werec/Sara Cruz
- Tsubasa: Reservoir Chronicle – Suzuran (episode 33)
- xxxHolic – Ran (episode 9)
- Yume Tsukai – Tōko Mishima
- Zegapain – Shizuno Misaki/Yehl
- Zero no Tsukaima – Henrietta

==== 2007 ====
- Bludgeoning Angel Dokuro-Chan 2 – Shizuki Minakami
- Claymore – Elena
- D.Gray-man – Angela/Sophia
- Getsumento Heiki Mina – Sumire Nishiha / Mīna Shiwasu
- Genshiken 2 – Kanako Ohno
- Hitohira – Nono Ichinose
- KimiKiss pure rouge – Tomoko Kawada
- Shattered Angels – Kaon
- Mokke – Shizuru Hibara
- Nodame Cantabile – Megumi Noda
- Potemayo – Mikan Natsu
- Princess Resurrection – Hime
- Romeo x Juliet – Emilia
- Shion no Ō – Shion Yasuoka
- Shining Tears X Wind – Blanc Neige and Clalaclan Philias
- Shakugan no Shana Second – Kazumi Yoshida
- Shinkyoku Sōkai Polyphonica – Eufinley Tsuge
- Sky Girls – Otoha Sakurano
- Skull Man – Kiriko Mamiya
- Zero no Tsukaima: Futatsuki no Kishi – Henrietta de Tristain
- Zombie-Loan – Kōume

==== 2008 ====
- Kanokon – Chizuru Minamoto
- Shina Dark – Noel D. Buche
- To Love Ru – Saki Tenjōin
- Zero no Tsukaima: Princesses no Rondo – Henrietta de Tristain
- Kyōran Kazoku Nikki – Dr.Eru
- Macademi Wasshoi! – Eineus The Vergest
- Nodame Cantabile: Paris Chapter – Megumi Noda
- Real Drive – Holon
- Skip-Beat! – Ruriko Matsunai
- Kuroshitsuji – Queen Victoria, Girl (episode 6)
- Kemeko Deluxe! – Fumiko Kobayashi
- Kiku-chan to Ookami – Kiku-chan

==== 2009 ====
- Pandora Hearts – Alice
- Tetsuwan Birdy: Decode Season 2 – Shouko
- Maria-sama ga Miteru – Yuuko Hosokawa
- The Tower of Druaga: The Sword of Uruk – Kirie
- Hayate no Gotoku 2nd Season – Athena Tennōsu
- Shinkyoku Sōkai Polyphonica Crimson S – Eufinley Tsuge
- 07 Ghost – Sister Atena
- Queen's Blade – Leina
- Pocket Monsters: Diamond and Pearl – Urara
- A Certain Magical Index – Laura Stuart
- Fight Ippatsu! Jūden-chan!! – Reika Galvani
- Battle Spirits: Shōnen Gekiha Dan – Mai Viole
- Hatsukoi Limited – Sumire Fudounomiya
- Kuroshitsuji – Queen Victoria
- Tatakau Shisho – Siron

==== 2010 ====
- Cobra the Animation – Ellis
- Nodame Cantabile: Finale – Nodame
- Ladies versus Butlers! – Tomomi Saikyo
- The Qwaser of Stigmata – Miyuri Tsujidō
- Fate/stay night: Unlimited Blade Works (2010 film) – Saber/Artoria Pendragon
- Gintama – Gedomaru
- Maid Sama! – Ayuzawa Minako
- Senkou no Night Raid – Shizune Yusa
- Bakuman – Kō Aoki/Yuriko Aoki
- Okami-san and her Seven Companions – Otsū Tsurugaya
- Motto To Love Ru – Saki Tenjōin
- Shinryaku!? Ika Musume – Ayumi Tokita
- A Certain Magical Index II – Laura Stuart

==== 2011 ====
- Bakuman 2 – Kō Aoki/Yuriko Aoki
- Gosick – Anastasia
- Fate/Zero – Saber
- Aria the Scarlet Ammo – Jeanne d'Arc
- Fairy Tail – Marl
- Ro-Kyu-Bu! – Hatsue Nobidome
- Shakugan no Shana III Final – Kazumi Yoshida

==== 2012 ====
- Familiar of Zero: F – Henrietta de Tristain
- AKB0048 – Sayaka Akimoto The 10th / Akira Igarashi
- Fate/Zero 2nd Season – Saber
- Accel World – Blood Leopard
- Girls und Panzer – Kay
- Tari Tari – Haruka Tanaka
- JoJo's Bizarre Adventure – Erina Pendleton
- To Love Ru Darkness – Saki Tenjōin
- Bakuman 3 – Kō Aoki/Yuriko Aoki
- The Pet Girl of Sakurasou – Rita Ainsworth

==== 2013 ====
- AKB0048 Next Stage – Sayaka Akimoto The 10th / Akira Igarashi
- Hayate the Combat Butler: Cuties – Athena Tennōsu (ver. Alice)
- Fate/kaleid liner Prisma Illya – Saber Alter
- Beyond the Boundary – Izumi Nase
- Unbreakable Machine-Doll – Avril

==== 2014 ====
- Amagi Brilliant Park – Moffle
- Fate/stay night: Unlimited Blade Works – Saber
- Dai-Shogun - Great Revolution – Kiriko Hitoribe
- Monthly Girls' Nozaki-kun - Yukari Miyako
- Ping Pong the Animation – Yurie
- Selector Infected WIXOSS – Hanayo
- Sword Art Online II – Aki Natsuki
- Terra Formars – Nanao Akita
- Witch Craft Works – Komachi Takamiya

==== 2015 ====
- Assassination Classroom – Aguri Yukimura
- Death Parade – Machiko
- Kantai Collection – Ōyodo
- Fate/stay night: Unlimited Blade Works S2 – Saber
- Food Wars: Shokugeki no Soma – Fuyumi Mizuhara
- To Love Ru Darkness 2nd – Saki Tenjōin
- Seraph of the End: Battle in Nagoya – Aoi Sangu

==== 2016 ====
- Maho Girls PreCure! – Loretta
- Assassination Classroom 2nd Season – Aguri Yukimura
- Keijo – Maya Sakashiro

==== 2017 ====
- Is It Wrong to Try to Pick Up Girls in a Dungeon?: Sword Oratoria – Riveria Ljos Alf
- Yu-Gi-Oh! VRAINS – Aqua
- Fate/Apocrypha – King Arthur (Episode 6)
- 18if – Eve

==== 2018 ====
- Katana Maidens ~ Toji No Miko – Akane Origami
- Laid-Back Camp – Tea girl
- Violet Evergarden – Clara Magnolia
- Lostorage incited WIXOSS – Hanayo
- Cells at Work! – Mast Cell
- A Certain Magical Index III – Laura Stuart

==== 2019 ====
- Star Twinkle PreCure – Taurus' Star Princess
- The Case Files of Lord El-Melloi II: Grace Note Rail Zeppelin – King Arthur's voice (episode 12, uncredited)
- Fate/Grand Order - Absolute Demonic Front: Babylonia – Fou
- We Never Learn – Hanae Yuiga
- Dr. Stone - Sulfurina/Ryu-san

==== 2020 ====
- The Misfit of Demon King Academy - Sheila

==== 2021 ====
- That Time I Got Reincarnated as a Slime – Beretta

==== 2022 ====
- Play It Cool, Guys – Shirakawa

==== 2023 ====
- 16bit Sensation: Another Layer – Kaori Shimoda
- A Playthrough of a Certain Dude's VRMMO Life – Karen
- Dr. Stone: New World - Sulfurina/Ryu-san

==== 2024 ====
- Chillin' in Another World with Level 2 Super Cheat Powers – First Princess
- Unnamed Memory – Lucrezia
- Tonari no Yōkai-san – Suzu Sakaki
- The Many Sides of Voice Actor Radio – Chika's Mother
- The Magical Girl and the Evil Lieutenant Used to Be Archenemies – Bellatrix

==== 2025 ====
- Private Tutor to the Duke's Daughter – Lisa Leinster
- Sakamoto Days – Mizuno

=== Original video animation (OVA) ===
- Hamtaro (xxxx)
- .hack//G.U. (xxxx) – Atoli
- Nakoruru ~Ano Hito kara no Okurimono~ (xxxx) – Manari
- Bludgeoning Angel Dokuro-Chan (xxxx) – Shizuki Minakami
- The King of Braves GaoGaiGar Final OVA (xxxx) – Papillon Noir
- One: Kagayaku Kisetsu e (xxxx) – Mizuka Nagamori
- Air Gear: Kuro no Hane to Nemuri No Mori (xxxx) – Simca
- Sorcerer on the Rocks (xxxx) – Taru-Ho
- Starlight Scramble Ren'ai Kohosei (xxxx) – Megumi
- Be Rockin' (xxxx) – Kaori
- Carnival Phantasm (xxxx) – Saber
- Tournament of the Gods (1997) – Shizuku-hime
- Kai Toh Ran Ma: The Animation (1999) – Mayura
- Angel Sanctuary (2000) – Sara Mudo
- Guardian Angel Getten OVA (2000)
- Gundam Evolve (2001) – Red Snake
- Usagi-chan de Cue!! (2001) – Miku
- Tristia of the Deep-Blue Sea (2004) – Nanoca Flanka
- Banner of the Stars III (2005) – Lafiel
- Shakugan no Shana Special (2006) – Kazumi Yoshida
- Sky Girls OVA (2006) – Otoha Sakurano
- Dai Mahō Tōge (2006) – Anego
- Strawberry Marshmallow OVA (2007) – Matsuri Sakuragi
- To Love Ru (2009) – Saki Tenjōin
- Zettai Junpaku: Mahō Shōjo (2012) – Erika Kuramoto
- The Kubikiri Cycle (2016) – Kanami Ibuki
- Fate/Grand Order: First Order (2017) – Fou, Saber Alter
- Strike the Blood (2020–2022) as Giada Kukulcan

=== Web ===
- Azumanga Daioh (2000) – Ayumu Kasuga a.k.a. Osaka

=== Film ===
- Crayon Shin-chan: Rumble in the Jungle (?) – Ai Suotome
- Ah! My Goddess: The Movie (2000) – Morgan le Fay
- Sin: The Movie (2000) – Elise Stewart
- Initial D Third Stage (2001) – Natsuki Mogi
- Pokémon: Jirachi—Wish Maker (2003) – Jirachi
- Brave Story (2006) – Mysterious girl
- Kino's Journey: Country of Illness -For You- (2007) – Inertia
- Shakugan no Shana movie (2007) – Kazumi Yoshida
- King of Thorn (2010) – Laura Owen
- Fate/stay night: Unlimited Blade Works (2010) – Saber
- Strike Witches: The Movie (2012) – Heinrike Prinzessin zu Sayn-Wittgenstein
- Fate/stay night: Heaven's Feel (2017–2020) – Saber
- A Whisker Away (2020) – Kaoru Mizutani
- Fate/Grand Order: Camelot - Wandering; Agaterám (2020–2021) – Lion King
- Fate/Grand Order Final Singularity - Grand Temple of Time: Solomon (2021) – Fou
- Zegapain STA (2024) – Shizuno Misaki

=== Video games ===
- .hack//G.U. – Atoli
- Aitakute... Your Smiles in My Heart – Senna Ninomiya
- Another Eden – Azami
- Asobi ni Iku Yo! -Chikyu Pinch no Konyaku Sengen- – Erisu
- Assassin's Creed: Brotherhood – Lucrezia Borgia
- Baldr Force EXE – Tsukina Sasagiri
- Blue Dragon – Kluke
- Cookie Run: Kingdom - Blackberry Cookie
- Counter:Side - Hayami Sanae
- Crayon Shin-chan: Kids Station! – Ai Suotome
- Cross Tantei Monogatari – Sato Hirokawachie
- Ehrgeiz – Yoko Kishibojin
- Eternal City - Kachigo
- Fate/Extella Link – Saber/Artoria Pendragon
- Forever Kingdom – Faeana
- Future GPX Cyber Formula: A New Challenger – Rena Yuuki
- Future GPX Cyber Formula: Road to the Infinity series – Rena Yuuki
- Gatekeepers 1970 – Ruriko Ikusawa
- Goemon: Shin Sedai Shuumei – Ebisu
- Gokujō Seitokai – Sayuri Hida
- Kikou Heidan J-Phoenix II – Risa
- Ichigo Mashimaro – Matsuri Sakuragi
- Initial D Special Stage – Natsuki Mogi
- MagnaCarta II – Rue
- Mana Khemia: Alchemists of Al-Revis – Isolde Schelling
- Mana Khemia 2: Ochita Gakuen to Renkinjutsushi-tachi – Ulrika Myberg
- Muramasa: The Demon Blade – Torahime
- Neosphere of the Deep-Blue Sky – Nanoca Flanka
- Odin Sphere – Gwendolyn
- One: Kagayaku Kisetsu e – Yukimi Miyami
- Only You - Re cross – Akiduki
- Oni – Shinatama
- Phantasy Star Universe – Lou, Lumia Waber (Japanese Version)
- Piece of Wonder – Amane Saionji
- Princess Maker 4 – Rize Dorbas
- Shikigami no Shiro III – Yuuki Sayo
- Shining Blade – Ira
- SNOW – Sumino Yukiduki
- Tales of Legendia – Grune, Schwartz
- Trauma Center: Second Opinion – Angie Thompson/Blackwell
- Tristia of the Deep-Blue Sea – Nanoca Flanka
- Valkyrie Profile 2: Silmeria – Silmeria
- Wild Arms: The 4th Detonator – Yulie Ahtreide
- Wrestle Angels: Survivor – Chigusa Yuuki
- You That Become A Memory ~Memories Off~ – Isago Narumi

==== 1997 ====
- To Heart – Akari Kamigishi

==== 1998 ====
- The King of Fighters: Kyo – Aoi Kusanagi

==== 1999 ====
- Kita e: White Illumination – Hayaka Sakyou

==== 2000 ====
- Gensou no Artemis – Mikoto Kunisu
- The King of Fighters 2000 – Hinako Shijou

==== 2001 ====
- Sister Princess – Chikage

==== 2003 ====
- Angelic Vale – Lician, Supica
- Fatal Frame II: Crimson Butterfly – Mayu Amakura, Sae Kurosawa
- Mahoromatic Moetto Kirakira Maid-san – Mahoro

==== 2005 ====
- Namco × Capcom – Sabinu, Wonder Momo
- Love Doll ~Lovely Idol~ – Aya
- Dead or Alive 4 – Kokoro

==== 2006 ====
- Dead or Alive Xtreme 2 – Kokoro

==== 2007 ====
- Dragon Shadow Spell – Miriam
- Fate/stay night – Saber (Arturia Pendragon)
- Fate/tiger colosseum – Saber (Aruturia Pendragon)
- Shining Wind – Kurarakuran
- KimiKiss – Tomoko Kawada

==== 2008 ====
- Fate/tiger colosseum Upper – Saber, Saber Alter
- Fate/unlimited codes – Saber, Saber Lily and Saber Alter
- Rune Factory 2: A Fantasy Harvest Moon – Julia

==== 2010 ====
- Dead or Alive: Paradise – Kokoro
- League of Legends – Leona

==== 2011 ====
- Dead or Alive: Dimensions – Kokoro
- Umineko no Naku Koro ni Chiru – Lion Ushiromiya

==== 2012 ====
- Dead or Alive 5 – Kokoro

==== 2013 ====
- Kantai Collection – Isokaze, Ōyodo, Unryū, Chūkan Seiki

==== 2014 ====
- Super Heroine Chronicle – Jeanne d'Arc
- Granblue Fantasy – Lecia, Athena

==== 2015 ====
- Fate/Grand Order – Saber/Artoria Pendragon, and Anne Bonny (uncredited)

- Saber/Artoria Pendragon: Base form, Archer, Alter, Maid Alter, Lancer, Lancer Alter, Ruler, Lily, Caster
- Anne Bonny: Mysterious Heroine X, Mysterious Heroine X (Alter), Mysterious Heroine XX, Merlin (Prototype), Mysterious Idol X (Alter)

- Luminous Arc Infinity – Libra
- Project X Zone 2 – Aty

==== 2016 ====
- Summon Night 6 – Ati
- Dead or Alive Xtreme 3 – Kokoro
- Girls' Frontline – P99

==== 2017 ====
- Xenoblade Chronicles 2 – Theory
- Azur Lane – King George V, Renown (Note: Kawasumi replaced Kayano for this role since 2022, after the latter's voice lines was removed from the Chinese servers of Azur Lane following her backlash as a result of her controversial Yasukuni Shrine visit in 2021.)

==== 2018 ====
- Sdorica – Sione Aldric
- Food Fantasy – Vodka, Ume Ochazuke, Canele
- Dragalia Lost – Eleonora, Malora
- Princess Connect Re:Dive – Jun Shirogane

==== 2019 ====
- Dead or Alive 6 – Kokoro
- The King of Fighters All Star – Hinako Shijou

==== 2020 ====
- Arknights – Siege
- Genshin Impact – Shenhe
- Punishing: Gray Raven – Bianca

==== 2022 ====
- Goddess of Victory: Nikke – Sugar, Nayuta

==== 2025 ====
- Honkai: Star Rail - Saber

==== 2026 ====
- Fatal Frame II: Crimson Butterfly Remake – Sae Kurosawa

=== Dubbing roles ===
- Fabricated City – Yeo-wool (Shim Eun-kyung)
- Genius – Young Elsa Einstein (Gwendolyn Ellis)
- Train to Busan – Runaway Girl (Shim Eun-kyung)

=== Drama CD ===
- Angel Sanctuary – Mudo Sara
- Strobe Edge – Kinoshita Ninako
- Haru Natsu Aki Fuyu – Natsuki Matsuzaka
- Fate/Zero – Saber
- Book Girl and the Famished Spirit – Amemiya Hotaru
- KOHA✩TALK – Blue Saber
- Azmaria Hendrick – Chrno Crusade
- Fushigi Yūgi Genbu Kaiden – Oracle Anlu

== Discography ==
=== Albums ===
Release date	Title
March 21, 2002	Primary
March 26, 2003	Mahoromatic for Ayako Kawasumi (まほろまてぃっく for 川澄綾子)
October 6, 2004	AA (with Ai Shimizu)

=== Singles ===
Release date	Title
September 23, 1998	Dream it
March 25, 1999	Owari no Nai Yume ni Mutte (終りのない夢に向って)
December 21, 2001	...to you
November 5, 2004	Ka・Ta・Ko・To (カ・タ・コ・ト)
November 14, 2005	Love Love! Chu Chu! (Love Love! Chuっ Chuっ!)
November 22, 2006	Watashi no Namida to Sora (私の涙と空)
December 20, 2006	Scoop! / 7 days after (with Mamiko Noto)

=== Character albums ===
Release date	Title
October 24, 2007	Sky Girls Character Mini-Album 1 (スカイガールズ キャラクター・ミニアルバム1) (Sakurano Otoha – with Tsuji Ayumi)

=== Character Singles ===
Release date	Title
December 21, 2001	Mahoromatic CD Dramatic 1 (まほろまてぃっく CDどらまてぃっく1) (Ando Mahoro – with Takada Yumi)
December 21, 2001	Mahoromatic CD Dramatic 3 (まほろまてぃっく CDどらまてぃっく3) (Ando Mahoro – with Takimoto Fujiko)
July 25, 2002	Ai Yori Aoshi Ao Uta (藍より青し 葵唄) (Sakuraba Aoi)
December 21, 2002	Mahoromatic ~Motto Utsukushii Mono~ Sound Party -Mahoro-ban- (まほろまてぃっく～もっと美しいもの～サウンドパーティ -まほろ盤-) (Ando Mahoro)
June 4, 2003	Omoide ni Kawaru Kimi Memory Collection Vol.5 Narumi Sako (想い出にかわる君 メモリーコレクション Vol.5 鳴海沙子) (Narumi Sako)
August 15, 2003	My Little Wing (Hitawari Aya – with Nogawa Sakura, Fukui Yukari and Tanaka Kumi)
April 6, 2005	Ichigo Mashimaro Chara-CD Mari (苺ましまろ Chara-CD 2 茉莉) (Sakuragi Matsuri)
July 27, 2005	Ichigo Complete (いちごコンプリート) (Sakuragi Matsuri – with Chiba Saeko, Orisaka Fumiko and Noto Mamiko)
September 7, 2005	Gokujou Seitokai Character Single Vol.3; Hida Sayuri & Tsunomoto Rein (極上生徒会キャラクターシングルVol.3 飛田小百合&角元れいん) (Hida Sayuri – with Matsuoka Yumi)
May 10, 2006	Kodou (鼓動) (Mishima Toko – with Shindo Kei)
August 9, 2006	Yume Tsukai Character CD ~Mishima Touko~ (夢使い キャラクターCD ～三島塔子～)(Mishima Touko)
December 27, 2006	Fate/stay night Character Image Song: Saber (Fate/stay night キャラクターイメージソング I:セイバー) (Saber)
August 22, 2007	Genzai no Aperitif (原罪のAperitif) (Hime)
October 10, 2007	Zero no Tsukaima ~Futatsuki no Kishi~ Character CD2 (ゼロの使い魔 ～双月の騎士～ キャラクターCD2) (Henrietta)
November 26, 2008	Kimi no Hikouki Kumo (きみのひこうき雲) (Eineus)
December 25, 2008	Ichigo Splash (苺すぷらっしゅ) (Sakuragi Matsuri – with Nabatame Hitomi, Chiba Saeko, Orikasa Fumiko and Noto Mamiko)
June 24, 2009	promise melody / Echoes (Eufinley Tsuge)
July 24, 2009	Queen's Blade Rurou no Senshi Character Song + Short Drama Reina Ver (クイーンズブレイド 流浪の戦士 キャラクターソング +ショートドラマ レイナver) (Reina)
September 21, 2009	Zero no Tsukaima Character CD Siesta & Henrietta-hen (ゼロの使い魔 キャラクターCD4 シエスタ&アンリエッタ編) (Henrietta – with Yui Horie)
January 27, 2010	LOVE × HEAVEN (Saikyo Tomomi – with Nakahara Mai, Koshimizu Ami and Kugimiya Rie)
