= Hiroyuki Morioka =

Japanese science fiction novelist

- Born: March 2, 1962 (age 64); Kobe, Hyōgo Prefecture, Japan
- Occupations: novelist, short story writer
- Writing career
- Period: 1992—present
- Genres: Science fiction, space opera, fantasy
- Notable works: Crest of the Stars, Banner of the Stars

Hiroyuki Morioka (森岡 浩之, Morioka Hiroyuki) (born March 2, 1962, Hyōgo Prefecture, Japan) is a Japanese science fiction novelist.

== Biography ==
In 1992, his first novel Yume no Ki ga Tsugeta nara ("If Only the Dream Trees Could Touch") appeared in Hayakawa Publishing's S-F Magazine. His short story "Spice" won the Hayakawa Award in 1993.

In 1996, he published his first long novel in three volumes, Seikai no Monshou (Seikai no Monshō/Crest of the Stars). In the next year 1997 Seikai no Monsho was awarded with Seiun Award at the Japan SF Convention. He released its sequel Seikai no Senki (Banner of the Stars), where he said that Seikai no Monsho was actually an overture to Seikai no Senki. Morioka had already suggested in Seikai no Monshou 2 that the entire series should narrate the life of Princess Lamhirh (aka Lafiel), from her birth to her eventual ascension to the imperial throne. Six volumes of Seikai no Senki are now available, with Morioka naming the first three the "Diahoc Trilogy", but the series itself has not yet finished. An English translation of "Seikai no Monshō/Crest of the Stars" has been published by Tokyopop, which came out from the fall of 2006 to May 2007.

Aside from the Seikai series, he published another Senki in 4 volumes, based on Japanese mythology, as well as a two-volume series, Seikai no Danshō (Fragments of the Stars), a collection of stories set in the same universe as the other two series.

His characteristics as a writer include a deep interest for linguistics (especially for conlangs), artificial intelligence, bitter humor, and well-designed world settings.

== Bibliography ==
- A Wilderness of Machinery: Metaldom (機械どもの荒野(メタルダム), Kikaidomo no Arano (Metarudamu)) (1997)
- If Only the Dream Trees Could Touch (夢の樹が接げたなら, Yume no Ki ga Tsuge ta Nara) (1999)
- Dandellion Wind ~ Ring World Legends ~ (風とタンポポ～惑星環物語～, Kaze to Tanpopo ~Wakusei Kan Monogatari~) (2009)
- A dream battle! Siege of Osaka (夢のまた夢 決戦！大坂の陣, Yume no Mata Yume Kessen! Ōsaka no Jin) (2011)
- Sudden Change (突変, Toppen) (2014)
- Private Interstellar War (プライベートな星間戦争, Puraibētona Hoshikansensō)（2023)

=== Stars (星界, Seikai) Series ===
- Crest of the Stars (星界の紋章, Seikai no Monshō)
  - Crest of the Stars I: Princess of the Empire (星界の紋章I 帝国の王女, Seikai no Monshō I Teikoku no Ōjo) (1996)
  - Crest of the Stars II: A Modest War (星界の紋章II ささやかな戦い, Seikai no Monshō II Sasayaka na Tatakai) (1996)
  - Crest of the Stars III: Return to a Strange World (星界の紋章III 異郷への帰還, Seikai no Monshō III Ikyō e no Kikan) (1996)
- Banner of the Stars (星界の戦旗, Seikai no Senki; lit. Battle Flag of the Stars)
  - Banner of the Stars I: The Ties That Bind (星界の戦旗I 絆のかたち, Seikai no Senki I Kizuna no Katachi) (1996)
  - Banner of the Stars II: What Needs Defending (星界の戦旗II 守るべきもの, Seikai no Senki II Mamoru Beki Mono) (1998)
  - Banner of the Stars III: Dinner With Family (星界の戦旗III 家族の食卓, Seikai no Senki III Kazoku no Shokutaku) (2001)
  - Banner of the Stars IV: Cacophonous Space-Time (星界の戦旗IV 軋む時空, Seikai no Senki IV Kishimu Jikuu) (2004)
  - Banner of the Stars V: The Fateful Inquiry (星界の戦旗V 宿命の調べ, Seikai no Senki V Shukumei no Shirabe) (2013)
  - Banner of the Stars VI: Imperial Thunder (星界の戦旗VI──帝国の雷鳴, Seikai no Senki VI Teikoku no Raimei) (2018)
- Fragments of the Stars (星界の断章, Seikai no Danshō)
  - Fragments of the Stars I (星界の断章I, Seikai no Danshou I) (2005)
  - Fragments of the Stars II (星界の断章II, Seikai no Danshou II) (2007)
  - Fragments of the Stars III (星界の断章III, Seikai no Danshou III) (2014)

=== The War Between Moon and Fire (月と炎の戦記, Tsuki To Honoo No Senki) Series ===
- The War Between Moon and Fire (月と炎の戦記, Tsuki To Honoo No Senki) (1999)
- The War Between Moon and Darkness 1: (月と闇の戦記一 退魔師はがけっぷち, Tsuki To Yami No Senki 1 Taimashi Wa Gakeppuchi) (2001)
- The War Between Moon and Darkness 2: (月と闇の戦記二 守護者はぶっちぎり, Tsuki To Yami No Senki 2 Gādian Wa Butchigiri) (2002)
- The War Between Moon and Darkness 3: (月と闇の戦記三 神様はしらんぷり, Tsuki To Yami No Senki 3 Kamisama Wa Shiranpuri) (2004)

=== Gentle Purgatory (優しい煉獄, Yasashii rengoku) Series ===
- Gentle Purgatory (優しい煉獄, Yasashii Rengoku) (2005)
- Gentle Purgatory 2: Town of noisy dead (優しい煉獄2 騒がしい死者の街, Yasashii Rengoku 2 Sawagashii Shisha no Machi) (2008)
- Dream to See in Hell (地獄で見る夢, Jigoku de Miru Yume) (2012)

== Awards ==
- Hayakawa Award (1993)
- Seiun Award (1997)
- Nihon SF Taisho Award (2015)
