= Seikai no Danshō =

Short story collections by Hiroyuki Morioka

- Seikai no Danshō I book cover

星界の断章
- Serial novel
- Written by: Hiroyuki Morioka
- Illustrated by: Takami Akai
- Published by: Hayakawa Publishing
- Imprint: Hayakawa Bunko
- Magazine: S-F Magazine
- Original run: August 1996 issue – November 25, 2013
- Volumes: 3
- Original video animation

Passage of the Stars – Birth
- Directed by: Osamu Nabeshima; Yasushi Nagaoka
- Studio: Sunrise
- Licensed by: NA: Bandai Entertainment (former) Funimation
- Released: April 7, 2000
- Runtime: 25 minutes
- Related
- Crest of the Stars; Banner of the Stars

Fragments of the Stars (星界の断章, Seikai no Danshō) is a series of books collecting short stories by Hiroyuki Morioka, set in the same universe and involving characters from his novels Crest of the Stars and Banner of the Stars, with many of them originally published in the S-F Magazine. The word Dansho refers to a passage from a written work, but there is currently no consensus on how the title should be translated. One story later included in the 2005 compilation Seikai no Dansho I, "Birth", was made into an anime OVA in 2000, four years after it was published in the S-F Magazine and five years before the consolidation of that story into the 2005 edition.

== Plot ==
Seikai no Danshō consists of short stories involving characters from the world of novels Crest of the Stars and Banner of the Stars.

== Media ==
=== Books ===
No.	Title	Release date	ISBN
1	Seikai no Dansho I (星界の断章I)	July 8, 2005	978-4150308025
"Genesis" (創生, Sousei) (S-F Magazine, February 1999 issue); "Feast" (饗宴, Kyouen) (booklet Guangzhou Eisei-adversity, 1997); "Collection" (蒐集, Shuushuu) (S-F Magazine, September 1999 issue); "Suckling" (哺啜, Hotetsu) (booklet Humankind Empire Abh, 2000); "Reign" (君臨, Kunrin) (S-F Magazine, February 1997 issue); "Secrets" (秘蹟, Hiseki) (with Crest of the Stars video game, May 25, 2000); "Nocturne" (夜想, Yasou) (The Battle of the Stars, 2001); "Shudder" (戦慄, Senritsu) (with Banner of the Stars video game, September 26, 2003); "Birth" (誕生, Tanjou) (S-F Magazine, August 1996 issue); "Tyrant" (暴君, Boukun) (booklet Heavenly Game, 2002); "Contact" (接触, Seshhoku) (The World of Banner of the Stars, 1999); "Original Sin" (原罪, Genzai) (newly written)
2	Seikai no Dansho II (星界の断章II)	March 9, 2007	978-4150308803
"Annexation" (併呑, Heidon) (with Crest of the Stars Drama CD Box, October 2005); "Envy" (嫉妬, Shitto) (Crest of the Stars Film Book 1, 2001); "Reporting for Duty" (着任, Chakunin) (with Banner of the Stars Drama CD Box, December 2005); "Childhood Friend" (童友, Douyuu) (with Banner of the Stars II Drama CD Box, February 2006); "Moving" (転居, Tenkyo) (with Banner of the Stars III Drama CD Box, April 2006); "Conspiracy" (謀計, Boukei) (Crest of the Stars Film Book 3, 2001); "Ball Games" (球技, Kyuugi) (Banner of the Stars Film Book 2, 2001); "Parting" (訣別, Ketsubetsu) (Crest of the Stars Film Book 2, 2001); "Childhood Prank" (童戯, Dougi) (Banner of the Stars Film Book 1, 2001); "Blessing" (祝福, Shukufuku) (Banner of the Stars Film Book 3, 2001); "Change" (変転, Henten) (S-F Magazine, April 2006 issue); "Adherence" (墨守, Bokushu) (newly written)
3	Seikai no Dansho III (星界の断章III)	March 20, 2014	978-4150311537
"Camp" (野営, Yaei); "Camping with Dusanyu" (ドゥサーニュの場合, Dousānyu no baai) (with Crest of the Stars DVD Box, May 28, 2010); "Camping with Penej (Spoor)" (ぺネージュの場合, Penēju no baai) (with Banner of the Stars I DVD Box, June 25, 2010); "Camping with Naurh (Ekuryua)" (ノールの場合, Nōru no baai) (with Banner of the Stars II/III DVD Box, July 23, 2010); "Departure" (出奔, Shuppon) (with "Star World Audio Drama CD Book with the Crest of the Stars and Banner of the Stars", March 23, 2011); "Intervention" (介入, Kainyū) (S-F Magazine, May 2013 issue, March 25, 2013); "Enticement" (誘引, Yūin) (doujinshi magazine Moon and Star Party, August 2007); "Eagre" (海嘯, Kaishō) (S-F Magazine, October 2013 issue, August 25, 2013); "Separation" (離合, Rigō) (published as "Crossroads" (岐路, Kiro) in S-F Magazine, January 2014 issue, November 25, 2013); "Visit" (来遊, Raiyū) (newly written)

=== Anime ===
A 2000 anime OVA adapted the first published Seikai no Danshō story, "Birth", that was included 5 years later in the 2005 book Seikai no Dansho I. It was released in North America by Bandai Entertainment on the final DVD volume of Banner of the Stars II release in 2003, and in 2013 was re-licensed by Funimation for a 2018 release with the Crest of the Stars DVD collection. It was also included in Crest of The Stars and Banner of the Stars Blu-ray collection, released in Japan on December 25, 2019.

Title	Original release date
"Birth" Transliteration: "Tanjou" (Japanese: 誕生)	April 7, 2000
Although anxious to get back to the capital and resume active military duty, Plakia agrees with the impulsive Debeus to take a brief detour from their honeymoon to view a supernova remnant up close. While talking about all sorts of degradation and prejudice that landers have poured against the Abh as a non-human race, an unrecognized object shows up on their monitor which they soon identify as a possible obsolete type of interplanetary ship. The couple board the dilapidated and seemingly empty ship to explore it. The old ship lurches into motion, leaving their own ship behind. To prevent the possibility of spending the rest of their lives floating aimlessly in space, Plakia decides to use explosives to alter the ship's course but suffers briefly from radiation leaving Debeus to finish up. Plakia stumbles upon a mummified corpse in the cockpit which unsettles her. In spite of her protestations, Debeus investigates and confirms that the corpse belong to a bioroid that seemed better built than their own Abh ancestors. As the explosives activate, the hold also cracks open and releases its cargo which bursts to reveal the bodies of other bioroids. As they successfully escape to their own ship, Debeus expresses his love for Plakia in the ultimate way that only the Abh can do. Thus, shortly thereafter, a baby girl is born. She is named Lafiel, a gem and source of life – a daughter of love.

=== Radio drama ===
"Contact", "Original Sin", "Annexation" and "Childhood Friend" adaptations were broadcast in 2006 by FM Osaka internet radio. "Original Sin" was the last work of the Seikai series starring Hirotaka Suzuoki, who died the same year.

=== Drama CD ===
"Birth" was released as a Drama CD in 2001 ahead of the radio broadcast. It was later included in the Banner of the Stars II radio drama CD-BOX (First Limited Edition) released in 2006 as an appendix along with the 5th episode "Childhood Prank". Also, the third episode "Blessing" was released as an appendix to the Crest of the Stars CD-BOX, the fourth episode "Ball Games" as an appendix to the Banner of the Stars CD-BOX, and the sixth episode "Jealousy" in Banner of the Stars III CD-BOX appendix. All of the above dramas were broadcast in 2006 after the end of the radio drama Banner of the Stars IV on FM Osaka. On February 23, 2011, "Contact", "Original Sin", "Annexation", "Childhood Friend" were released as "Star World Audio Drama CD Book with the Crest of the Stars and Banner of the Stars". For Bandai Namco Arts Official Shop December 25, 2019, release of "Seikai Series Complete Blu-ray BOX", "Separation of the Star World: Day of the Fall of Lakfakar" was recorded.
