= Pokémon: The Electric Tale of Pikachu =

Japanese manga series

電撃!ピカチュウ (Dengeki! Pikachū)
- Manga
- Written by: Toshihiro Ono
- Published by: Shogakukan
- English publisher: NA: Viz Media; SG: Chuang Yi
- Magazine: Bessatsu CoroCoro Comic Special; CoroCoro Comic
- Original run: April 1997 – December 1999
- Volumes: 4

The Pokémon Graphic Novel, more commonly known as Pokémon: The Electric Tale of Pikachu (Japanese: 電撃！ピカチュウ, Hepburn: Dengeki! Pikachū; lit.'Electric Shock! Pikachu'), is a Japanese manga series written and illustrated by Toshihiro Ono. It was serialized in the children's manga magazine Bessatsu CoroCoro Comic Special and CoroCoro Comic from April 1997 to December 1999. Individual chapters were collected into four tankōbon volumes by Shogakukan, who released the first volume on October 28, 1997, and the fourth volume on January 28, 2000. The characters and storylines are all loosely based on the Pokémon anime series, so, some events and depictions of characters diverge slightly from the anime, and the world itself has a visibly higher level of technology.

The manga was published in English in North America by Viz Communications in a "flipped", left-to-right format. The Electric Tale of Pikachu marked the first time that any of the Pokémon manga series were translated to English. Viz first released the series as individual comic book issues in November 1998, then later collected into trade paperback volumes in August 1999. At the time of its release, Issue #1 was the best-selling manga issue, and best-selling comic book of any type, in the United States. The issue sold 1.001 million copies, the highest for a single comic book since 1993. The first volume, The Electric Tale of Pikachu!, was released on August 1999. The third volume, Electric Pikachu Boogaloo, was released on April 5, 2000.

In Singapore, the manga is published in English by Chuang Yi and translated as Pokémon: The Electric Tale of Pikachu! for all four volumes. The Traditional Chinese edition in Taiwan of the manga is published by Da Ran Culture Enterprise and Chingwin Publishing.

== Development ==
Toshihiro Ono, the author of the series, said that he began drawing the series after Saito, Ono's editor, asked Ono to draw a manga to go along with the anime. During the production of the manga, Ono received scripts of the anime series. The author then altered the stories to fit the desired amount of pages used per storyline.

Ono said that his favorite manga chapter was "Clefairy Tale" from the first volume and that he was "embarrassed that I can't say why." According to Ono he did not find any particular chapter to be more difficult than any other chapter. He said that when the episode "Clefairy in Space" ("Subway no Pipi") was going in manga form, Ono had to redraw many of the pages, a time-consuming process. Ono encountered difficulty in drawing Dragonite in the final chapter, as he struggled to "get a face that cute to look powerful." His favorite human characters to work with were Ash Ketchum and Jessie and James. In particular he liked Jessie and James because they are minor characters and "have much more freedom" than main characters. Therefore, minor characters are "more fun to draw." Ono's favorite characters to draw were Ash Ketchum, Ditto, Nurse Joy, and Oddish.

== Characters ==
Japanese names in Western order (given name before family name) are given first, followed by the English name. For simplicity, English language names will be used in this and other articles in Wikipedia about Pokémon, unless explicitly referring to the Japanese version.

- Satoshi / Ash Ketchum - The main character, whose name in the Japanese version (Satoshi) is named after Satoshi Tajiri, the creator of the Pokémon games. He is a Pokémon Trainer who aspires to be a Pokémon Master, and embarks on many adventures with the various friends and Pokémon that travel with him. In a similar fashion to the game, Ash does this by entering various Pokémon League competitions.
- Kasumi / Misty - A Water-type Pokémon Trainer and the Gym Leader of Cerulean City. She is the youngest of four sisters. Like her anime counterpart, she joins Ash on his journey after he "borrows" her bike and Pikachu destroys it. Although critical towards Ash, she develops romantic feelings towards him, who appears to reciprocate.
- Takeshi / Brock - A Pokémon Breeder and the Gym Leader of Flint City. Unlike his anime counterpart, he never joins Ash on his journey and the only time they meet is during Ash's battle with him for his second Gym Badge.
- Pikachu, a little, yellow, mouse-like creature with a lightning bolt tail and the ability to create electrical jolts from its cheeks. Unlike the games or anime, Ash finds this Pikachu chewing on the electrical wiring in his house, and keeps it as his first Pokémon when he qualifies to be a Pokémon Trainer.
- Shigeru / Gary Oak - His name in the Japanese version (Shigeru) is named after famed video game designer Shigeru Miyamoto. Unlike his anime counterpart, this version of Ash's rival does not hang out with a pack of cheerleaders, nor does he travel by car, though he retains his antagonistic attitude towards Ash. In the manga's epilogue he travels with Ash.
- Team Rocket- A chaos-causing 'gang' that has many goals, mainly conquering the Pokémon world.
- Musashi / Jessica "Jessie" - The main female member of Team Rocket. In the manga's epilogue, she quits the gang, marries James, and is expecting their first child.
- Kojiro / James - The main male member of Team Rocket. In the epilogue, he quits the gang, marries Jessie, and is expecting their first child.
- Nyarth (ニャース, Nyāsu) / Meowth - The talking cat of Team Rocket. One of very few Pokémon that can speak a human language.
- Sakaki / Giovanni - The seldom-seen boss/leader of Team Rocket.

== Volumes ==
No.	Title	Original release date	English release date
1	The Electric Tale of Pikachu!	October 28, 1997; 4-09-149341-6	September 5, 1999 (United States); 978-1-56931-378-7
Bonus 1. "Tales Of Pikachu In The Wild"; 01. Pikachu, I See You! (ピカチュウ, Pikachū; "Pikachu"); 02. Clefairy Tale (オツキミ山, Otsukimi Yama; "Mt. Moon"); 03. Play Misty For Me (カスミ, Kasumi); 04. Haunting My Dreams (シオンの塔, Shion no Tou; "Pokémon Tower")
2	Pikachu Shocks Back	June 27, 1998; 4-09-149342-4	December 6, 1999 (United States); 978-1-56931-411-1
Bonus 2. "I Am Ditto!"; 05. The Human Race and the Pokémon Race (激走！ ポケモンレース, Gekisou! Pokemon Reesu; "Gotta Race! Pokémon Race"); 06. To Evolve or Not to Evolve, That Is the Question! (タイチとイーブイ, Taichi to Iibui; "Taichi and Eevee"); 07. Pikachu's Excellent Adventure (ピカチュウエレキ旅, Pikachuu Ereki Tabi; "Pikachu's Electric Journey"); 08. You Gotta Have Friends (ともだち, Tomodachi; "Friends"); Bonus 3. "I am Porygon."; Bonus 4. "Suddenly It's Questioning Time!"
3	Electric Pikachu Boogaloo	April 26, 1999; 4-09-149343-2	April 5, 2000 (United States); 978-1-56931-436-4
Bonus 5. "I Am Hungry!"; 09. I'm Your Venusaur (神さま, Kami-sama; "God"); 10. Clefairy in Space (地下鉄のピッピ, Chikatetsu no Pippi; "Clefairy in the Subway"); 11. Days of Gloom and Glory (リンドウ, Rindou; "Lindow"); 12. Welcome to the Big Leagues (セキエイリーグ開催, Sekiei Riigu Kaisai; "Indigo League Begins"); 13. The Indigo Finals (ヒロシ, Hiroshi; "Richie"); 14. The Orange Islands (オレンジ諸島, Orenji Shotou)
4	Surf's Up, Pikachu	January 28, 2000; 4-09-149344-0	August 10, 2000 (United States); 978-1-56931-494-4
Bonus 6. "The Ultimate Pet Of The 21st Century"; 15. Attack of the Demon Stomach (カビゴン, Kabigon; "Snorlax"); 16. You Bet Your Wife (ユズジム, Yuzu Jimu; "Yuzu Gym"); 17. The Orange Crew Supreme Gym Leader (ウイナーズカップ, Uinaaazu Kappu; "Winner's Cup"); 18. Pikachu's Plan (ウイナーズカップ②, Uinaaazu Kappu (2); "Winner's Cup (2)"); 19. Side Story: Ash vs. Gary (ヤドン, Yadon; "Slowpoke"); Epilogue: ""Type: Wild" - A Possible Future"

The series was originally released in the United States in American comic book format. Part 1, Issue #1 was released in November 1998 with the subsequent three issues released in December 1998, January 1999, and February 1999. Part 2, Issue #1 was released in March 1999 with the subsequent three issues released in April, May, and June of that year. Part 3, Issue #1 was released in July 1999 with the subsequent three issues released in August, September, and October of that year. Part 4, Issue #1 was released in November 1999 with the subsequent three issues released in December 1999, January 2000, and February 2000. In 1999 Viz released extremely low print samplers that were only available in the Pokémon Video Suitcase promotional set Pokémon Electric Tale of Pikachu Special Signature Edition, which contained the printed autograph signature of Toshihiro Ono on the cover. The special signature editions were available in a Red Version and a Blue Version.

== Reception ==
=== Sales ===
The Electric Tale of Pikachu! sold well in the United States. In 1999, Comichron reported that series had sold more than a million copies; The Daily Oklahoman stated that most of those sales were sets purchased through large retail chains.

=== Critical reception ===
Jason S. Yadao, the author of The Rough Guide to Manga, wrote that "the story was predictable" and that "narrative complexity never was a defining trait of the franchise." Jeff Kapalka reviewed the series in its entirety for The Post-Standard, giving it three and a half stars out of four. He praised the series for its story and art, also noting that some knowledge of Japanese culture would be needed to fully understand some humor and references.

Rachael Brown reviewed the second volume for The Hamilton Spectator, citing its humor as a highlight and recommending it for children ages eight and up.

== See also ==
- Magical Pokémon Journey (known in Japan as PiPiPi's Adventures)
- Pokémon Adventures (known in Japan as Pocket Monster Special)
- Pokémon Pocket Monsters (known in Japan as Pocket Monsters)
