= Aimoto =

Aimoto (愛本 or 相本) is a Japanese surname. Notable people with the surname include:

- Mizuho Aimoto (愛本 みずほ), Japanese manga artist
- Yuka Aimoto (相本 結香), Japanese actress and voice actress

== See also ==
- Aimoto Station (disambiguation), multiple railway stations in Japan
- 10853 Aimoto, a main-belt minor planet
