= Asako Dodo =

Japanese voice actress

- 百々 麻子
- Born: November 8, 1967 (age 58); Kanagawa Prefecture, Japan
- Occupations: Voice actress, stage actress
- Years active: 1992–present
- Agent: Ken Production

Asako Dodo (百々 麻子, Dodo Asako; born November 8, 1967) is a Japanese voice actress from Kanagawa, Japan.

== Filmography ==
=== Anime ===
==== 1995 ====
- Ping Pong Club (Yuki Tanabe)
- Saint Tail (Imamura)

==== 1996 ====
- Detective Conan (Clerk, Masayo Tokudaiji, Midori Kuriyama, Receptionist, Yuko Ikezawa)
- B'tX (B'T Jutaime)
- You're Under Arrest (Judy)
- Virtua Fighter (Nio)

==== 1997 ====
- Cutey Honey Flash (SCUD Panther)
- Kindaichi Shounen no Jikenbo (Shinshi Kaitou)
- Manmaru the Ninja Penguin (Escaping girl, Kado)
- Flame of Recca (Reina)
- Yume no Crayon Oukoku (???)

==== 1998 ====
- St. Luminous Mission High School (Elizabeth Ryouko Bryan)

==== 1999 ====
- Kamikaze Kaitou Jeanne (Tsubasa Nagatanigawa)
- GTO: Great Teacher Onizuka (???)
- Ojamajo Doremi (Fafa)

==== 2000 ====
- Mon Colle Knights (???)
- Digimon Adventure 02 (Ken's Mother)
- Saiyuki (Sanbutsushin 2)
- Hand Maid May (Aoi Saotome)
- Inuyasha (Kagome's mother/Mrs. Higurashi, Geisha)
- One Piece (Carmen)

==== 2001 ====
- Comic Party (Yuka Tsukishiro)
- Najica Blitz Tactics (Shinobu Misato)
- Vandread: The Second Stage (Onna)

==== 2002 ====
- Tokyo Underground (Leader)
- G-On Riders (Commanding officer)
- Getbackers (Bather)

==== 2003 ====
- Lime-iro Senkitan (Sumi Ichijouji)
- Mouse (Mei's Grandfather)
- Zatch Bell! (Toy Store Salesgirl)
- Happy Lesson Advanced (Beauty Honey)
- Rumiko Takahashi Anthology (Kobato's son, Ryuuichi)
- Planetes (Announcer, Girl, Girlfriend, Housewife)
- Mermaid Forest (Sayori)

==== 2004 ====
- Mezzo (Announcer)
- Ragnarok The Animation (Sohi)
- Monster (Receptionist)
- School Rumble (Doctor Michiko)
- Black Jack (Young Black Jack)

==== 2005 ====
- Lime-iro Ryūkitan X (Sumi Ichijoji)
- Comic Party: Revolution (Yuka Tsukishiro)
- Speed Grapher (Congresswoman)
- GUNxSWORD (Head nurse, Staff woman, Waitress, Woman)
- Lamune (Hiromi's mother)

==== 2006 ====
- Black Jack 21 (Young Black Jack)
- Nighthead Genesis (Sachie Haga)
- Kemonozume (Amakami, Exam student's mother)
- Gift - eternal rainbow (Sensha's Mother)
- Kekkaishi (Female headquarter member, Kagami-kun, Shizue Yukimura, Tatsuki, Teacher)

==== 2007 ====
- GR -GIANT ROBO- (Celestine Buñuel)
- Magical Girl Lyrical Nanoha StrikerS (Quint Nakajima)
- Shigurui: Death Frenzy (House Keeper)
- Neuro - Supernatural Detective (Announcer)

==== 2008 ====
- RIN - Daughters of Mnemosyne (Rona Kurōderu)
- Nabari no Ou (Juuji's mother)
- Code Geass: Lelouch of the Rebellion R2 (Marianne vi Britannia, Sister)
- Uchi no 3 Shimai (???)
- Live On Cardliver Kakeru (Tenkū Musutangu)
- Chaos;HEAd (Senna's Mother)

==== 2009 ====
- Rideback (Woman Newscaster)
- Sōten Kōro (Bai Lian)
- Princess Lover! (Teppei's Mother)
- InuYasha: The Final Act (Kagome's Mother)
- Kobato. (Homeroom teacher)

==== 2010 ====
- Togainu no Chi - Bloody Curs (Emma)

==== 2022 ====
- Detective Conan: Zero's Tea Time (Midori Kuriyama)

=== Movies ===
==== 1999 ====
- Kindaichi Shounen no Jikenbo 2 - Satsuriku no Deep Blue (Voice of Aurora Vision)

==== 2000 ====
- Case Closed: Captured in Her Eyes (Midori Kuriyama)

==== 2001 ====
- Case Closed: Countdown to Heaven (Motherhood)
- Inuyasha the Movie: Affections Touching Across Time (Kagome's Mother)

==== 2002 ====
- Case Closed: The Phantom of Baker Street (Japanese woman announcer)

==== 2004 ====
- Detective Conan: Magician of the Silver Sky (Yuki)

==== 2006 ====
- Detective Conan: The Private Eyes' Requiem (Midori Kuriyama)

==== 2008 ====
- Detective Conan: Full Score of Fear (???)

=== Video games ===
==== 2000 ====
- Flamberge no Seirei (Shifōne)

==== 2001 ====
- Comic Party (Yuka Tsukishiro, Makiko Sawada)

==== 2004 ====
- Castle Shikigami 2 (Fumiko Ozetto van Stein)
- Limeiro Senkitan * Jun (Sumi Ichijouji)

==== 2005 ====
- Comic Party Portable (Yuka Tsukishiro)

==== 2006 ====
- Gift -prism- (???)
- Mizu no Senritsu 2 ~Hi no Kioku~ (Ya Shitara)

==== 2009 ====
- Touka Gettan ~Koufuu no Ryouou~ (Kasuga, Sachiko Gotanda)

==== 2010 ====
- Blaze Union: Story to Reach the Future (Baretreenu)

=== Dubbing ===
- Charmed, Kyra (Charisma Carpenter)
- Close Encounters of the Third Kind: The Final Cut, Ronnie Neary (Teri Garr)
- In Bruges, Jimmy (Jordan Prentice)
- Jason Bourne (2022 BS Tokyo edition), Nicolette Parsons (Julia Stiles)
