= Ratman (disambiguation) =

Ratman is a 1988 Italian horror film.

Ratman, Rat-Man or Rat Man can also refer to the following:

- Rat-Man (comics), an Italian comic book series by Leonardo Ortolani, and its title character
- Ratman (manga), a Japanese manga by Sekihiko Inui, and its title character
- Rat Man, a nickname given by Sigmund Freud to one of his patients
- "Ratty" Erwins, also known as "The Rat Man", a character in Stephen King's The Stand
- Ratman, a character in the animated series Dexter's Laboratory from the 1996 episode "The Justice Friends: Ratman"
- "Rat Man", a nickname and alter-ego of Japanese serial killer Tsutomu Miyazaki
