= Murder Princess =

Japanese manga series

- First tankōbon volume cover
- Genre: Action; Comedy; Dark fantasy
- Manga
- Written by: Sekihiko Inui
- Published by: MediaWorks
- English publisher: NA: Broccoli Books
- Magazine: Dengeki Teioh
- Original run: April 26, 2004 – November 25, 2006
- Volumes: 2
- Original video animation
- Directed by: Tomoyuki Kurokawa
- Written by: Tatsuhiko Urahata
- Music by: Yasafumi Fukuda
- Studio: Bee Train
- Licensed by: NA: Funimation
- Released: March 28, 2007 – August 29, 2007
- Runtime: 30 minutes
- Episodes: 6
- icon

Murder Princess (stylized in all caps) is a Japanese manga series written and illustrated by Sekihiko Inui. It was serialized in MediaWorks's Dengeki Teioh from April 2004 to November 2006, with its chapters collected in two tankōbon volumes. It was published in North America by Broccoli Books. A six-episode original video animation adaptation, produced by Marvelous Entertainment and animated by Bee Train, was released in 2007. It was licensed in North America by ADV Films, but was transferred to Funimation in 2008.

== Plot ==
The story begins with Dr. Akamashi, introduced as a power-hungry former royal scientist, launching a coup d'état in the Forland Kingdom. The king, mortally wounded, makes arrangements seconds before his death for his daughter Alita to find Prince Kaito, who is leading a diplomatic mission and its military escort abroad. The princess escapes the castle and flees into the nearby forest, but her escort are swiftly killed and eaten by a hostile forest guardian beast.

While running for her life, the princess falls off of a cliff and onto Falis, an infamous female bounty hunter. Due to the nature of the near-death experience (referred to as a spiritual commutation, or spiritual transmigration in the anime dub) the souls of Alita and Falis are switched. After Falis dispatches the forest's guardian beast, Alita pleads with the bounty hunter to protect the Forland kingdom, offering herself, body and soul, as collateral. Falis agrees and acts as the princess of the Forland Kingdom with her bounty hunter friends.

== Characters ==
=== Heroes ===
Alita Forland (アリタ‧フォーランド, Arita Fōrando) / Milano (ミラノ, Mirano)
Voiced by: Ami Koshimizu (Japanese); Monica Rial (English)
Second child of the late King Forland. She escapes from the castle during Akamashi's coup, running into Falis and switching bodies with her due to a near-death experience. In return for helping with the defense of the kingdom, she offers the bounty hunter her body and soul. She later assumes the identity of her former maid Milano, who died ensuring her safe escape during the coup, and assists Falis with running the kingdom. Alita was very wavering at first, not given the time to grieve her father and her friend Milano's death, and she is forced to protect her kingdom until her brother, Kaito, arrives. But as the series progress, Alita becomes more strong-willed and bold, especially when it comes to Falis's safety. This is demonstrated when she learns the truth of Kaito's treachery, she protects an injured Falis by luring him into thinking she was Alita so Falis could be safe. Alita angrily declares Kaito a disgrace to their royal bloodline at that moment. After this Falis and Alita become closer and more protective of each other for the remainder of the series.
Falis (ファリス, Farisu) / Alita (アリタ, Arita)
Voiced by: Romi Park (Japanese); Colleen Clinkenbeard (English)
Falis is one of the strongest and the most infamous bounty hunters in the world, even attributed with having slain a dragon. When operating near the border of Forland Kingdom, Princess Alita runs into her, and the two of them end up switching bodies by accident. Now stuck in Alita's body, she makes a deal with Alita to assume her identity and defend her kingdom. Falis' weapon of choice is the ancient katana Himetsuru (姫鶴, ひめつる; lit. Crane Princess); she sometimes uses a dagger in conjunction with the sword. Experiencing hardships in the past, Falis is tough, resilient, and impulsive but she is shown to have a more thoughtful and empathetic side that is perhaps rarely seen. In the beginning of the series, Falis thought Alita was a frail and weak-minded princess who couldn't do much on her own. But that thought changed throughout the series after seeing Alita's strong-will and courage, prompting Falis to keep her promise as the princess of Forland Kingdom. Falis has a strong relationship with Alita, she remained loyal even after finding out the truth of Alita's family secrets and is very protective of her, not hesitating to strike down any opponents who threaten Alita.
Dominikov (ドミニコフ, Dominikofu)
Voiced by: Kazuki Yao (Japanese); Chuck Huber (English)
A fellow bounty hunter working for Falis. In the manga he is a Shinigami with extensive knowledge, while in the anime he is a cyborg. His weapon of choice is a large scythe.
Pete Armstrong (ピート‧アームストロング, Piito Amusutorongu)
Voiced by: Akimitsu Takase (Japanese); Ben Phillips (English)
Fellow bounty hunter working for Falis. While he is big, ferocious, and overpowering in hand to hand combat, beneath his purple skin is a gentle soul. Like Dominikov, Pete is a cyborg in the anime version.
Jodo Entolasia (ジョドォ‧エントラシア, Jodō Entorashia)
Voiced by: Takkou Ishimori (Japanese); R Bruce Elliott (English)
Butler of Forland Kingdom's royal family. He has a very serious personality and is strict when he is training Alita in the ways of a princess. He continues to serve in this capacity after Alita and Falis switch bodies, in order to aid Falis in acting out her part.
Milano Entolasia (ミラノ‧エントラシア, Mirano Entorashia)
Voiced by: Mayuko Takahashi (Japanese); Brittney Karbowski (English)
The real Milano, Alita's maid and granddaughter of Jodo. She disguises herself as Princess Alita to buy Alita time to escape from Akamashi's coup d'état, but is killed while carrying out that role. Alita later assumes Milano's identity.

=== Villains ===
Dr. Akamashi (アカマシ)
Voiced by: Hiroshi Tsuchida (Japanese); Mark Stoddard (English)
Formerly a scientist working for the late King Forland. He has abused lost technology entrusted to the Forland royal family, and conspires to take over the kingdom in order to gain complete possession over said technology. It is later revealed that Cecilia informed him of the lost technology which corrupted him. He seeks to capture Alita alive. Akamashi is an expert in creating artificial lifeforms, be they of flesh and blood or of metal. However he is later killed by Kaito after discovering Teoria's location.
Ana (アナ)
Voiced by: Chiwa Saito (Japanese); Carrie Savage (English)
One of Dr. Akamashi's robotic bodyguards. Ana is built in the shape of a little girl with technology originating in "the Old World". She is extremely aggressive and likes to taunt her opponents, with no regard for human lives except Akamashi's. Her ability and equipment are specialized for close quarter combat.
Yuna (ユナ)
Voiced by: Chiwa Saito (Japanese); Carrie Savage (English)
One of Dr. Akamashi's robotic bodyguards, built in the same manner as Ana. Contrary to Ana, however, she is timid and shy, albeit with a tendency of going berserk and letting loose her firepower upon everyone in sight if Akamashi is in grave danger. Her use of technology from "the Old World" is more obvious, including an array of precision, long-range weapons such as guns and missiles.
Cecilia (セシリア, Seshiria)
Voiced by: Megumi Toyoguchi (Japanese); Wendy Powell (English)
A powerful sorceress who is tracking Alita's every move. Not much about her is known except that she is a relic from the old world, supposedly also a cyborg as stated by Diminikov during their battle. She is the hand acting behind the scenes, manipulating both Prince Kaito and Dr. Akamashi into seeking Teoria. She is also responsible for wiping out Falis' village in a 'test' of her own strength and is ultimately killed when Falis destroys the jewel below her neck.
Prince Kaito / The Dark Knight (黒い騎士, Kuroi Kishi)
Voiced by: Daisuke Namikawa (Japanese); Patrick Seitz (English)
Prince of Forland, Kaito is Alita's older brother and eight years her senior. She speaks of him fondly, bragging of his swordsmanship as well as his kindness. Prince Kaito left the country to hold peace talks with Forland's western neighbor, the kingdom of Grandel, but no one has heard from him since. When he comes back, it is revealed that he is the man clad in a heavy, dark-colored set of armor that accompanies Cecilia. He is shown to be quite skilled at swordsmanship. He wishes to use Teoria to destroy the world due to humanity's constant wars.

== Media ==
=== Manga ===
Written and illustrated by Sekihiko Inui, Murder Princess was serialized in MediaWorks's Dengeki Teioh from April 26, 2004, to November 25, 2006. Its chapters were collected in two tankōbon volumes, released on September 27, 2005, and February 27, 2007.

In North America, the manga was licensed by Broccoli Books. The two volumes were released on August 1 and December 10, 2007.

=== Anime ===
A six-episode original video animation (OVA) series was produced in 2007 by Marvelous Entertainment and animated by Bee Train. It was the first Bee Train production since 1999 to not be directed by company founder, CEO and chief staff director Koichi Mashimo. Mashimo was on board as a planning staff member. The video series was scripted by Tatsuhiko Urahata. Bee Train staff director Tomoyuki Kurokawa was placed as the Chief Director and directed the animators and other directors Shin'ya Kawatsura and Tomoaki Kado.

Production AI Art directors Yoshimi Umino and Shin Watanabe were the principal art directors for the videos and Yoshimitsu Yamashita was the character designer and music was composed by Yasufumi Fukuda. The opening theme is "The Direction the Light Points" (ヒカリサスホウ, Hikari Sasuhou) FK Metal ver., performed by Back-On, while the ending theme is "Naked Flower", performed by Romi Park.

==== Episodes ====
No.	Title	Original release date
1	"Birth"; Transliteration: "Tanjō" (Japanese: 誕生)	March 28, 2007
Dr. Akamashi initiates a coup d'état in the Forland kingdom, killing the king in the process. This forces Alita, the Forland princess, to flee in the hopes of reaching her brother, Kaito. A short while later in a border forest, Alita accidentally pushes the bounty hunter Falis off a cliff while fleeing from the forest guardian beast, Jitterbug, who killed her entourage of castle guards. This results in Alita's and Falis's souls switching bodies due to the near-death experience. Falis wakes up in the body of the princess and panics for a little bit when she sees her body. A moment later, she kills Jitterbug when it attacks the group. Alita, seeing Falis's strength and bravery, begs her to help protect Forland. Falis refuses at first due to her policy of a guaranteed collateral but accepts after Alita offers her own body and soul as collateral. She and Falis returns to the castle with Dominikov and Pete at their side, and Falis defeats Akamashi and the androids.
2	"Coronation"; Transliteration: "Taikan" (Japanese: 戴冠)	April 25, 2007
Falis, now in the body of Alita, liberates the Forland castle from Dr. Akamashi and his henchrobots, Ana and Yuna. The real Alita, now in the body of Falis, assumes the role of Jodu's deceased granddaughter Milano, who died while acting as a substitute for Alita. She aids Falis in assuming the proper manners of a princess, like how to eat properly with a fork and knife, and how to wear a corset. The next day, Falis is crowned the Queen of Forland in Alita's place. However, the coronation parade is disturbed by Dr. Akamashi's evil plans. Falis fights back and beats the monster. However, she starts to lose control of herself and nearly strikes down a little girl, only to be stopped by Alita at the last second.
3	"Return"; Transliteration: "Kikan" (Japanese: 帰還)	May 30, 2007
Falis accidentally breaks the doll that Alita got as a present from the real Milano, Alita's friend who was killed on the first night that Falis was in the castle, and the two of them get into an argument. Falis goes off to vent her steam on the encroaching goblins invading Forland's border. During this time, Akamashi, Ana, and Yuna kidnap Alita and interrogate her about her real identity and about the "key", but Alita stays firm and reveals nothing to them. Falis comes to the rescue but is coerced into dropping her weapon. She is beaten up pretty badly when a swordsman then leaps onto the scene and saves the day. The man is revealed to be Prince Kaito, Alita's older brother.
4	"Exile"; Transliteration: "Tsuihō" (Japanese: 追放)	June 27, 2007
Since the prince has returned and is soon to be crowned, Falis plans to leave the next day. Alita says she'll be lonely, but she's told Falis will return when she finds a way to swap bodies again. Later in the evening, Falis is called by the mysterious hooded woman and led into a secret chamber in the castle, leaving her sword behind by accident. It turns out that the woman is a witch named Cecilia, who wants to use Alita's body to open the secret chamber. They fight and Alita and the others come down to help her, but they run into the two androids and the professor. Suddenly the professor is stabbed from behind by the black armored knight, and the two androids are also defeated. Cecilia returns, and when her hood falls back, Falis recognizes her as the witch who killed her village and family a long time ago. Falis attacks the witch but is intercepted by the black knight. She is badly beaten by the knight, who reveals himself to be Kaito in front of all the guests. He claims that Falis is a false princess and that the others are rebels, turning the kingdom against them. The four of them are forced to flee the kingdom and Kaito is crowned as king.
5	"Fate"; Transliteration: "Shukumei" (Japanese: 宿命)	July 25, 2007
Falis, Alita and their companions manage to evade capture thanks to a group of travelling entertainers. When they stop to take a break, they begin to discuss the circumstances behind everything that has transpired so far. It turns out that the root cause to all the trouble is the Lost Technology, which was entrusted to the House Forland after the demise of the Old World and is protected by a seal that can only be opened by female members of the House. It is also revealed that Dominikov, Pete, the androids, and all the other synthetic beasts were created from that technology. They are attacked by Kaito, Cecilia, and the Forland army soon after. The androids try to hold off the army for a little bit but run out of ammo and battery power. Pete and Dominikov release their true cyborg forms and hold off the enemy. Nearly reaching the border, Kaito attacks the wagon and nearly everyone passes out, except Alita. She runs off into the woods with a cloak and holding Falis's sword to distract Kaito. In the forest, Kaito is about to kill Alita but pauses when he recognizes the strong gaze that she gives him. Falis regains conscious and injures Kaito, unable to kill him due to her condition. Kaito flees and the army retreats. Falis realizes that she and Alita cannot run from their fates anymore and must fight to win back the country from Kaito and Cecilia.
6	"Determination's End"; Transliteration: "Ketsui no kan" (Japanese: 決意の完)	August 29, 2007
Falis, Alita, and the rest of the group returns to the kingdom in order to stop Kaito from using Teoria. However, they also decide to use the powers of Teoria to switch their bodies back to their original ways. Unfortunately, Kaito makes it to the Teorial chamber first, knocking out Falis and capturing Alita. Kaito then wishes for the entire world to end. Before Kaito is able to completely activate Teoria, Falis regains conscious and attacks Kaito. Cecilia intercepts Falis and the two of them fight. Cecilia nearly kills Falis, but Falis destroys the jewel on Cecilia's chest and Cecilia dies. Kaito activates Teoria and nearly defeats Falis in the process. But Falis got right back up and defeats Kaito, nearly killing him, but stops herself at the last minute for Alita's sake. She then stops Teoria. However, as a final fail-safe measure, Teoria wipes out Dominikov, Pete, the androids, and all the synthetic beasts created with the Old World's science before its shutdown. Falis promises Alita that she will protect the country and find a way to switch them back into their normal bodies.

== Reception ==
In Jason Thompson's appendix to Manga: The Complete Guide, he praised the "stylized, cute artwork", calling it "the best feature of this short and tame action-adventure comic."
