= Tsubasa Otomiya =

Japanese voice actress

- 音宮 つばさ
- Born: June 20, 1978 (age 48); Tokyo, Japan
- Occupation: Voice actress
- Years active: 1998-2014

Tsubasa Otomiya (音宮 つばさ, Otomiya Tsubasa; born June 20, 1978) is a Japanese voice actress from Tokyo, Japan.

== Voice acting ==
- Super Doll Licca-chan (1998 TV series) as Assistant A (ep 11), Fumiko Takabayashi (eps 8, 13, 36), Girl (ep 6), O-Hariko-san A (ep 16)
- Legend of Himiko (1999 TV series), Himiko Himejima
- Raimuiro Senkitan (2003 TV series), Sarasa Honda, Theme Song Performance
- Raimuiro Senkitan: The South Island Dream Romantic Adventure (2004 OVA), Sarasa Honda, Theme Song Performance
- Viewtiful Joe (2004 TV series), Koko (ep 11)
- Koi Koi Seven (2005 TV series), Miya Higashikazuno
- Soreyuke! Gedou Otometai (2005 TV series), Yoku Hokke
- Akahori Gedou Hour Rabuge (2005 TV series), Yoku Hokke

== Single and album ==
- "Cold Flowers" (凛花, "Rinka") released on December 25, 2002, and ranked 131st in Oricon singles charts.
- "Sarasa Honda" (本多更紗) image song album of the eponymous character released on May 28, 2003.
