= Shizuka Hasegawa =

Japanese voice actress

Shizuka Hasegawa (長谷川 静香, Hasegawa Shizuka; born September 16, 1988) is a former Japanese voice actress from Tokyo, Japan. She appears as a main cast member in a number of Japanese anime series including as: Yukino in Nagasarete Airantō, Nana in Angel Tales, Tomohane in Inukami, Akane Miura in Rocket Girls, and Tama Hieda in Shrine of the Morning Mist.

== Filmography ==
- Aishiteruze Baby as Namiko (ep 23)
- Angel Tales as Inu no Nana (Dog)
- Futakoi as Ruru Hinagiku
- Futakoi Alternative as Ruru Hinagiku
- Inukami! as Tomohane
- Lucky Star as Yutaka Kobayakawa
- Nagasarete Airantō as Yukino
- Rocket Girls as Akane Miura
- Shrine of the Morning Mist as Tama Hieda
- Tenshi no Shippo Chu! as Dog Nana
- Whistle! as Miyuki Sakurai
- Sumomomo Momomo as Koganei Tenchi
- Onegai My Melody as Harumi
- Whispered Words as Kiyoka
- Lilpri Manatsu Natsume

== Live-action roles ==
- Negima! Magister Negi Magi as Misora Kasuga
