= Nagasarete Airantō =

2007 manga by Takeshi Fujishiro and its franchise

- Japanese cover of Nagasarete Airantō volume 1 featuring the two main characters, Ikuto Tōhōin (back) and Suzu (front)

ながされて藍蘭島
- Genre: Harem, romantic comedy
- Manga
- Written by: Takeshi Fujishiro
- Published by: Enix (2002–2003); Square Enix (2003–present)
- Imprint: Gangan Comics
- Magazine: Monthly Shōnen Gangan; Gangan Powered (gaiden)
- Original run: January 2002 – present
- Volumes: 43
- Light novel
- Written by: Shōgo Mukai
- Illustrated by: Takeshi Fujishiro
- Published by: Gangan Comics
- Original run: November 30, 2004 – April 30, 2008
- Volumes: 3
- Anime television series
- Directed by: Hideki Okamoto
- Produced by: Shinichi Ikeda; Atsushi Moriyama; Keiichi Kashiwata; Tomoko Kawasaki
- Written by: Mamiko Ikeda
- Music by: Hiromi Mizutani
- Studio: Feel
- Licensed by: NA: Discotek Media
- Original network: TXN (TV Tokyo)
- Original run: April 4, 2007 – September 26, 2007
- Episodes: 26
- icon

Nagasarete Airantō (Japanese: ながされて藍蘭島, Hepburn: Nagasarete Airantō; lit. "Cast Away... Airan Island") is a Japanese harem manga series by Takeshi Fujishiro. It was first serialized in Square Enix's Monthly Shōnen Gangan magazine in January 2002, and a few years later expanded into a multimedia franchise including drama CDs, light novels, and a 26-episode anime adaptation by Studio Feel that aired in Japan between April 4 and September 26, 2007.

From the same author, there is a sister series titled Cahe Detective Club which features the cousins of certain characters from this series.

== Plot ==
After an argument with his father, 14-year-old Ikuto Tōhōin runs away from home and out to sea, only for a massive storm to send him adrift and eventually strand him on an uncharted tropical island named Airantou (藍蘭島; lit. 'indigo orchid island'). Half-drowned, he is found by a kindhearted but naive girl named Suzu, who (clumsily) resuscitates him and takes him into her care.

Soon after, Ikuto learns that Airantou was settled 130 years ago by a group of Japanese that had been shipwrecked during a voyage to Europe. Though their Meiji-era village survived and prospered to the modern day, its entire male population was claimed by a rogue wave during a fishing tournament some twelve years before. As a result, nearly every girl of Suzu's generation is desperate for a husband and immediately latches onto Ikuto as a prime candidate; to his dismay, their attentions quickly erupt into violent competition, forcing Suzu to protect him.

At first eager to escape the island (and stymied only by the quasi-magical whirlpools surrounding the entire coast), Ikuto eventually settles into his new life with Suzu, befriending her as well as many of the other girls pursuing his hand. Together, they engage in countless mishaps and adventures, heartily encouraged by not only the village matriarch – Suzu's grandmother – but the increasingly large cast of anthropomorphic animals and Yōkai that also call Airantou home.

== Characters ==
Ikuto Tōhōin (東方院 行人, Tōhōin Ikuto)
Voiced by: Sōichirō Hoshi (drama CD), Hiro Shimono (anime)
Ikuto, age 14, the main character, is stranded on Airan Island. He has inherited his grandfather's determination; the words "It's impossible!" send him into a state of berserk tenacity, usually accomplishing his goal or getting struck unconscious trying. Ikuto completely refuses to accept anything supernatural. It is revealed that a cryptic jutsu was cast on him by a specialist (Nagamasa) to make him reject anything occult, to not make him think Misaki is not human. Three years ago, his mother went missing during her trip to Okinawa. One day, he overheard his father and his grandfather's secretary (Hiragi Iwatsuki) talking about marriage. He misunderstood and decided to skip school to search for his mother to cancel the marriage, but his father found out they started to argue. He ran away on a cruise liner, arriving on the island due to a storm. Kind and helpful, Ikuto's physical ability pales in comparison to that of the women on the island at first; in the beginning he cannot understand any of the animals on the Island whereas the women can (he can understand later). Conservative, Ikuto finds it difficult to accept Airan's freeload customs. Due to the Island's girls inexperience with boys they'll often try to seduce him, which results in most of the time in failure or Ikuto having an exaggerated nosebleed and passing out. Ikuto refuses to do anything towards them, as he thinks that they only care for him because he is the only male on island.
He starts training with Karaage, after realizing his swordsmanship had decayed after he came to Airan. Ikuto is actually very smart however, acting as the island's math and science teacher, and loved to read mystery novel, proving he is very rational. Suzu seems to be the only one who has genuine feelings for Ikuto from the start though she does not realize it until later, and he develops feelings for her (and Rin) due to her kindness, but seems to deny these feelings, thinking that Suzu only sees him as family. Ikuto develops a strong rivalry with Beniyasha (Chikage's mother) who creates mischief on the island to publish his novels, especially when he flirted with Suzu that made Ikuto really jealous. In the second son-in-law contest, Ikuto won due to his training able to deceive or at least land a hit on each of the lords.
Upon Ikuto and Misaki's reunion, their grandfather has been locating Ikuto aided by former males of Airan: Nagamasa, Machi's and Ayane's father; Tadanori, Rin's father; Hideaki, Yukino's father; Kiyomasa, Chikage's father; Takatora, Suzu's father; Hanzou, Shinobu's father; and Masamune, Misaki's biological father.
Suzu (すず)
Voiced by: Yui Horie (drama CD/anime)
Suzu, age 13, is the main female character of the story. She is an honest girl and can be very spontaneous when excited. She is the first person that Ikuto meets on the island and possibly the closest one to him. As the series progresses, Suzu develops feelings for Ikuto, but at first, she has trouble realizing it due to her inexperience with boys. Later on, she gets very jealous whenever another girl gets close to him (Manifested as a dangerous aura shaped like a murderous cat) and even attempts to have him kiss her by pretending she drowned and attempts to have a date with him. She does not mind being naked around Ikuto and does not understand why Ikuto always gets nosebleeds and passes out whenever this happens, especially when she attempts to bathe with him that she enjoys. She is still very happy to have him in her life, since she had been living alone with her pet piglet Tonkatsu (lit. "breaded pork cutlet") due to Suzuran's disappearance.
Suzu loves sweets to the point where she can be easily bribed with them, especially with the special "Mame Daifuku" treats made by Ayane's and Machi's mother. Suzu is one of the best players of shogi and other strategy games on the island, to the point that she could easily beat Ikuto. She is also good at jujutsu, and was trained by the Southern Leader because she once threw Ayane on top of a tree; although her mother was even stronger than the current Western Leader, she did not teach Suzu Jujutsu, probably due to that she wants Suzu to be more feminine. However, Suzu lacks basic education compared to most of the girls on Airan as she cannot comprehend simple mathematics and tries to skip school as much as she can. Ironically, she has demonstrated an aptitude for deduction, which is associated with intelligence and logic. She is also torn between her feelings for Ikuto and a wish that Ikuto could get off the island, although she wishes he would stay, she knows that he has his family on the outside world, and it would be wrong to keep him here.
Ayane (あやね)
Voiced by: Yukari Tamura (drama CD), Saeko Chiba (anime)
Ayane is Suzu's rival, always being defeated by her and wanting to win at least once. The fact that she constantly loses makes Suzu somewhat doubtful of her ability as an individual. In spite of her appearance, she is actually 16-years-old, and being underdeveloped she is also jealous of Suzu's sudden growth; nevertheless, she is close friends with Suzu, usually being the first to accompany her house when Suzu's mother had disappeared. She is arrogant, often saying she is the handiest and prettiest girl on the island. She is deathly afraid of Machi, her older sister, and uses anesthetic darts as her main weapon. She hopes to take Ikuto captive and trump Suzu. She is a miko at the local shrine along with Machi and their mother Chizuru (whom Ikuto mistook for her sister at first).
She also frequently uses a giant ostrich named Monjiro as transportation. Out of the series's main characters, Ayane is the most frequent victim of violent slapstick; her body has great tolerance to pain due to her extreme bad luck which caused her a great number of accidents daily. She loves super spicy food, as they are the only food Machi would not take from her. After accidentally kissing Ikuto (chapter 69), she finds that she cannot approach him without getting flustered as she developed real feelings for him. She is very intelligent being the best prankster on the island, except for Machi who almost seems to play pranks on Ayane herself.
Throughout the manga, despite her scheming personality, she is actually the most pure-hearted, usually being the most considerate in situations. For example: being the only one who did not try to spy on or sabotage Ikuto and Mei-Mei's date, actually giving them a scroll with suggestions on the best date-spots on the island, and being able to remember Michiru's name while others get it wrong.
Machi (まち)
Voiced by: Masumi Asano (drama CD), Mikako Takahashi (anime)
Machi is Ayane's elder sister and, despite being smaller than Ayane, she is actually 18-years-old. Despite her innocent looks, Machi is something of a sadist; she often tortures Ayane with her voodoo doll, finding beauty in her pained, frightened expressions. She also tends to take the most dangerous methods to getting things done. In her childhood, she often doted on her baby sister, but at some point, transitioned into terrorizing her. She alludes to the fact that the more she tortures people the more she likes them, suggestion her sadistic acts may be her own sign of affection. She sees herself as well past the appropriate marrying age and pursues a romance with Ikuto to avoid becoming an old maid. Her age is her biggest insecurity, and she becomes depressed whenever someone calls her old. She has a talent for magic, such as summoning shikigami, though she usually ditches all other cleaning and cooking duties at the shrine. Like her sister Ayane, she is quite proficient with using the blowgun. Machi has a habit of making surprise entrances (such as trapdoors and open ceilings).
Rin (りん)
Voiced by: Yū Asakawa (drama CD), Ryōko Shiraishi (anime)
Rin is an apprentice carpenter who is popular on Airan due to her somewhat tomboyish outfit and attitude, she was the subject of a lot of attention and romantic interest from other women before Ikuto's arrival. She found this situation so uncomfortable that she developed a tendency to bathe alone. Despite her masculine mannerisms, Rin is shown to be appallingly bad at her hard labor job of carpentry and quite skilled with domestic chores such as cooking and sewing. Initially, Rin propositions Ikuto to be her husband to prove her heterosexuality (and so end the advances made on her by the other girls); however, she and Ikuto soon develop real feelings for each other. She calls Ikuto "danna" ("hubby" or husband), much to Ikuto's chagrin. She is the strongest person on the island, which hurts her feminine pride, but she secretly was proud of her appearance. She loves to dress up, but she at first embarrassed as she thought she was not feminine enough to look good in them, till Ikuto said she look pretty.
Chikage (ちかげ)
Voiced by: Ai Nonaka (drama CD), Shizuka Itō (anime)
Chikage is obsessed with scientific research, and wants Ikuto for the sole purpose of examining a real male and learning about the world beyond the island from him. She collects things that drift in from the modern world and plans on adding Ikuto to her collection, seeing him as a potentially invaluable source of information. Chikage lives in the only Western-style house on Airan with her elephant maid, Panako. She has a habit of reading mature magazines and gets misguided ideas from them to use against Ikuto. Although Ikuto believes her to be a calm, well-behaved girl, Yukino has noted that Chikage tends to perform strange experiments and questionable research. In the manga, and episode 17, she proves the truth of this statement when she briefly gains access to magic and causes havoc around the island until it is taken away by an angry Panako. Chikage soon becomes fascinated with the novels brought by Ikuto (unaware that the author is her father). In the beginning of volume 12, she explains that she, Yukino, Kunai, Shinobu and Mikoto are cousins which explains her occasional appearance in Shinobi suit.
Yukino (ゆきの)
Voiced by: Rie Kugimiya (drama CD), Shizuka Hasegawa (anime)
Yukino is the youngest girl on the island, being eleven-years-old, and is sensitive about her age. She has an affinity for animals and is usually seen riding one, most often a giant bear named Kuma-Kuma. Her connection to nature dates back to when she was too young to help with farm work, and was often left to play with the woodland creatures. Her habit of riding everywhere would suggest that she should tire easily, but in the anime, she is quite athletic, being able to race with her animal friends and win. She has a habit of referring to herself in the third person. In the chapter 81 manga it is shown if Yukino eats well, she will grow up to be beautiful, busty and curvy, despite her mother's build.
Shinobu (しのぶ)
Voiced by: Orie Kimoto
Shinobu is Mikoto's sister, but unlike her more of a practitioner of Bushido than a kunoichi. She meets him when he is poisoned at her house, and she gives him the antidote mouth-to-mouth. After her first meeting with Ikuto, she challenges him to a duel due to the exaggerated rumors of his strength, much to his reluctance. After Ikuto unexpectedly defeats her in a match, to his exasperation, she decides to become his apprentice. Despite being a ninja, she is a bit on the clumsy side (she trips on her own sword, then later stumbles off the edge of a cliff), and has a horrible sense of direction. But Ikuto has stated she is faster than the lords. She ends her sentences with the phrase "-de gozaru", similar to the phrase "-desu" but in an archaic form used by samurais in the past. She became a samurai due to her admiration of Miyamoto Musashi through reading books (Surprisingly, she read even though not on Ikuto's level). As a running gag, Shinobu's endurance is even higher than Ayane which indicate Shinobu's clumsiness causes even more troubles to her than Ayane's bad luck to her.
Mikoto (みこと)
Voiced by: Akeno Watanabe
Mikoto is a kunoichi and an apprentice carpenter who is obsessed with Rin (Mikoto is so far the only girl identified as not developing any feelings for Ikuto) and always attempts to peek at or touch her body, particularly when she is bathing. She is about the same age as Suzu. She is often jealous of Ikuto to the point that she would either threaten to hurt him or outright throw shurikens and/or heavy objects at him, but in response Rin will often make short work of her. Her family, of which she is the youngest human member, consists entirely of practitioners of Ninpo and Bushido.
Mei-Mei (梅梅 (メイメイ))
Voiced by: Chiemi Chiba (drama CD), Hitomi Nabatame (anime)
Mei-Mei is an outsider just like Ikuto. Her family worked as traveling performers, but she kept messing up and embarked on a journey that got her to the island. She is very shy and reclusive, to the point where she is forced to illustrate her thoughts through drawings, and she cannot talk to a stranger unless she is wearing a disguise (usually a large tree costume) though she eventually discards this habit. She befriended the kappa, Tohno, during her travels, and the creature has accompanied her to the island. Mei-Mei develops feelings for Ikuto after he fought for her so she would not get taken away by Taiga, who wanted her to become the North Leader for (accidentally) defeating him. She apparently began reading "weird" love novels according to Tohno and began having strange fantasies about Ikuto whenever something flirty such as kissing, or bathing is mentioned. Mei-Mei trains regularly in acrobatic skills such that she has shown almost superhuman levels of agility and flexibility (capable of jumping between trees and mountain parts). She is quite intelligent as during examination day at the island's school she managed to get a perfect score on every subject. As side note, she is terrified of the police (even police cosplay) due to her past experiences on the run.
Michiru (みちる)
Michiru is the 16-year-old descendant of Obaba. She is a half-yōkai; her mother Tsurara is a yuki-onna. She is weak against the heat resulting in her staying indoors most of the time, though she can go out. After completing a task, she is given a snow spirit allowing her to go outside for longer periods of time. However, a running gag is that since she previously could not interact with the villagers, they now often forget or mistaken her name, much to her annoyance. She is in love with Ikuto, stating that she was the first to have romantic feelings for him since the beginning when he arrived. She has noticed him staring at her since they first met (when his stares were actually due to her resemblance to Misaki). She is very skilled with the bow and arrow, but lazy, usually sleeping and staying at home. Michiru experiences an awkward time while learning she and Misaki are related, as Misaki thinks of her as a lazy shut-in.
Obaba (オババ)
Voiced by: Kujira
Obaba, originally named "Koto", is the village chief and doctor, and probably the oldest person surviving on Airantō—as depicted in the manga and the anime, she had survived since the shipwreck and is probably over 148 years old. Despite her age, she is still quite spry and strong, capable of inflicting physical punishment on the disrespectful or simply intimidating them back in line. Her specialization is medicine and pressure points. While she mostly plays a minor role in the story, there are certain events that revolve around her. She has a descendant Michiru (みちる), who appears in episode twenty-six of the anime for a moment. She wishes to act as a midwife once more, and usually force Ikuto to get married. She calls him 'no balls', and feels he is stupid for not taking advantage of his situation.
It is also revealed that she knows the Southern and Northern Leaders from their childhood and is respected greatly by them. In chapter 149 of the manga, Obaba is reincarnated into a young, nine-tailed fox-youkai that she is in fact to be, capable of possessing, mind-reading, and advance combating at least three Airan Leaders at once. She is in fact, descended from youkai, and this explained her incredible longevity.
Misaki Tōhōin (東方院 美咲, Tōhōin Misaki)
Voiced by: Risa Shimizu
Misaki is Ikuto's adoptive sister. Although it was not explored as much, in the letter Misaki sends to Ikuto, it can be assumed that she is very talkative. She is introduced when Suzu and the others (aside from Mei Mei) saw a picture of her with Ikuto and mistook her for his lover.
In the original manga she is not seen as much, but seems to feel for her brother asking for dates. She appears later in the manga getting Ikuto's letter (chapter 105) and angrily exclaims that only girls are on Arian island and better not be dating her brother. She mysteriously arrive (chapter 124) and attempted to take Ikuto back to Japan, but Ikuto proved himself of his skills and decision to remain on the island. Misaki in this version is revealed to be non-blood ice youkai related to Ikuto, signaling one more rival in the island. She moves in with Ikuto, and views Suzu as a sister. Like Ikuto, Misaki often nosebleeds due to excitement, though not at girl but at cute animals in general. After Obaba's rebirth, it revealed that Misaki's biological mother is Tsurara, making Misaki and Michiru sisters. As infant Misaki had also been swept from the island along with the men, including her long-lost father, before reaching the mainland and brought to the Tōhōin household. Trying to re-acquaintance with her real mother, Tsurara intends to bring her and Michiru together, although Misaki doesn't want Ikuto and Suzu left living (romantically) alone again.

=== Non-human ===
Panako (ぱな子)
Voiced by: Mayumi Iizuka
Panako is Chikage's housekeeper who first appears in episode eight of the anime. She is a pink elephant who is very kind to others, even though a bit clumsy and ignorant to her natural superior strength as an elephant. The citizens of Airan, animal and human alike, refer to her as the most beautiful creature (or girl, like Suzu said) on the island. As shown when humans and animals switch for one arc, she is a very beautiful woman, enough to make Ikuto blush at first sight.
Tohno (遠野, Tōno)
Voiced by: Rio Natsuki
Tohno is a female kappa who, a thousand years before the events of the story, caused so much trouble that a monk sealed her away. The manga later stated why she was sealed. She was a troublesome youkai, that would eat farmers' cucumbers. So much a Buddhist monk would be called to deal with her. The monk tried to talk her out of her misdeed, but she refused, They would often fight, and they slowly became friends. But eventually heretic Buddhist monks focused on destroying Yokai appeared, as Tohno and the kind monk ran, he sealed her to protect her, when the heretics would disappear. Mei Mei would freed her when she left the circus and became close friends. Tohno is supposedly a skilled enough warrior break even with Machi on bare hands fight and when anything goes (Tohno as a youkai, knows magic), to defeat Pandaro, the Eastern Leader. Tohno acts as Mei Mei's older sister, protecting and helping her. She dislikes that Ikuto refuses to believe that she is a Kappa, but is ready to believe science fictional stories, like aliens.
Sakuya (さくや)
Voiced by: Yumi Kakazu (drama CD), Yuki Matsuoka (anime)
Sakuya is a female mechanical doll who was built about 130 years ago on Airan by an unknown creator. She might have been created by the aliens that came to the island long ago. She owns and runs a hot spring and hotel resort at one end of the island. At times, her body parts fall off; she needs only reassemble herself to resume perfect working order. Her utmost and constant concern is the well-being of her customers, which she is programmed to protect using an arsenal of built-in weapons and surveillance equipment.

=== Others ===
Kiyomasa (清正)
Voiced by: Toshihiko Seki
He happens to be Chikage's father and older brother to Kagami. When he was young, he had influenced his wife Shizuka on doing a mystery novel which came into the Beniyasha novel series. His current location is in Japan living with the Tōhōin residents, writing novels under the name "Shimizu Seimaru", with an Airan code which Shizuka deciphered. He appears to be in the anime series in episode 20.
Kagami (かがみ)
Voiced by: Mika Kanai
Kagami is Yukino's mother. Even at her full adult height, she stands little more than a head above her daughter, and has a childish personality to match her small stature. Kagami loves games and often steals the attention of Yukino's animal friends for playtime. However, she seems to possess a hidden maturity, and commands of her own right a loyal hawk named Taka-Taka.
Kunai (くない)
She is the older sister of Shinobu and Mikoto and like her sister's, she is also a kunoichi. She happens to be a teacher in the island, and she is fond of using smoke bombs to get away. She's also fond of hugging people who she thinks are small and cute. She did not appear in the anime series, but was mentioned in episode 18.
Suzuran (すずらん)
Suzu's mother who went missing three years prior to the story's start. Though Suzu has depicted her mother to Ikuto as something of a calm and gentle woman, Karaage has mentioned that it was simply a front to convince Suzu to be a lot more like a girl than her mother was although it appears that she was not completely successful as Suzu shows similar traits to Suzuran whenever she gets angry or jealous, possibly through genes. Karaage's flashbacks in chapters 76-77 reveal a lot about Suzuran and her husband, Takatora. Suzuran looks and for the most part, acts exactly like Suzu does in the present. She also shows jealousy about her future husband much in the same way Suzu does for Ikuto (a bit more extreme, however, since she uses more harsh words) though Suzuran is a bit less oblivious than Suzu, as she is able to, at least to herself, admit that she has feelings for Takatora. However, she is extremely slow to realize that Takatora had confessed to her, but eventually does and accepts his feelings. Her and Takatora also built the house that Suzu lives in which is on top of a hot spring that Takatora dug up. Takatora shares some similarity with Ikuto in appearance, except more muscular.
Suzuran is the actual strongest fighter in the island. Karaage as the strongest master doesn't even come close to her level even when joining force with Machi.

=== Leaders ===
Airan is divided into four sections, five if the surrounding waterways are included: North, South, East, and West, but also includes the surround water. Each section has its own Leader who as the strongest individual, maintains the law and order of the area. The main mission of the leaders is to not only protect their area but also the Sea Dragon God who is the Great Lord of the island and has the power to protect those from large storms. He was responsible for bringing Ikuto safely into Airantō. The leaders are as follows:

- The Northern Leader is a two-tailed oddly bipedal tiger with a prominent scar on his face named Taiga and is equally matched with the Southern Leader (they have known each other since childhood). Despite his looks and his strength, he appears to be quite a gentle individual (He reads novels, protects the cherry blossom tree and once in a while, make friendly contacts with humans and other lords except the East's). In addition, he recently married a Tigeress who became a youkai like him, but since he is shy, he spends very little time with her, much to her annoyance. As a child he was, in fact, rather timid. He was forced to become strong, when Obaba planted the only cherry blossom on the island in the north, due to the suitable climate and then demanded that he protect it from the other northerners who might want to destroy it.
- The Southern Leader is a two-tailed cat named Shima-Tora, who was Suzu's master in the martial arts and shapeshifting, and is said to have lived for over one hundred years. He generally wears disguises to change his appearance, although he can change it with magic. This involves pulling the desired form, from within his mouth, and flipping himself inside out. Due to rather macabre nature of his magic, he avoids using it. He is the leader of cats on the island and engages in a yearly battle with dogs, who also reside in the south for control. However, the battle is more of a game, as it doesn't really matter to them who wins or loses.
  - In manga, he has a wife named Myaa that is also a two-tailed and can transform into a beautiful human girl, which she always does before meeting her husband because her real form is currently overweight due to her gourmet habit (it is said that she can easily exhaust the island's food supply and make fruits become extinct).
- The Eastern Leader is a panda named Pandaro, who seems to fear the other Leaders, implying that he is the weakest of the Leaders; he rules over the eastern forest which is feared for the fact that it is home to carnivorous plants (which ironically are his favorite food); was the first Leader whom Ikuto encountered. Pandaro is also the most hostile Leader (if not only) to outsiders, rather than Taiga who only seems unfriendly and prefers peace. He's not a yōkai but is more powerful than most, except for the leaders. He has a habit of going after females whom he thinks are cute, regardless of species, which makes his wife extremely anger, especially since he has children. He is especially fond of Mei-Mei and is the leader of her fan-club. Despite his many flaws, he takes his position as leader very seriously.
- The Western Leader is a rooster named Karaage, who lives very close to Suzu and Ikuto's house; he even has a wife and children living with them, whom he loves dearly. While he is hailed as the strongest fighter on the Island, Karaage is not a yōkai and does not have spiritual power like Taiga and Shima-Tora. As a result, he points out himself, that he is not all powerful, and is not suited for fighting spiritual power users. This does not mean, he cannot beat them, however. His strength is revealed to be from brutal training and sparring with Suzu's mother, Suzuran, as she tried to teach him to fly. She, along with Obaba are among the few people whom Karaage cannot beat. When he discovered he was a rooster and would never be able to fly, he became a delinquent for a short period before Suzuran beat him up, and forced him back on the right path.
  - In the manga, it is revealed that the West once used to have an unnamed emperor penguin for the leader who has a descendant that later competed with Karaage for the master seat (Suzu just calls him Master).
- In addition, a female orca named Sashimi dwells in the waters that surround the island and is called master of the sea. Though she does not speak, Suzu seems able to communicate with her. She does speak, when she is brought on land for the yearly festival. Sashimi's duty is to stop those who wander too close to the dangerous whirlpools that surround Airan.

== Media ==
=== Manga ===
The Nagasarete Airantō manga began serialization in the January 2002 issue of Monthly Shōnen Gangan, published by Square Enix. Additional chapters were serialized in the magazine Gangan Powered, but transferred to Monthly Shōnen Gangan after Gangan Powered was discontinued in early 2009. Square Enix has published 39 tankōbon volumes and one "guide book" containing various background information as of May 2023.

=== Drama CDs ===
There have been two drama CDs released based on the series.

- Comic CD Collection 30 Nagasarete Airantō Vol.1, ISBN 4-7575-1154-X, released February 20, 2004
- Comic CD Collection 32 Nagasarete Airantō Vol.2, ISBN 4-7575-1380-1, released February 10, 2005

After the airing of the anime adaptation, several drama CDs has also been released, with the anime cast voicing their respective characters.

=== Light novels ===
There have been three light novels based on Nagasarete Airantō written by Shōgo Mukai and illustrated by Ken Fujiyo. The first went on sale in November 2004, the second in March 2007 and the third in April 2008.

=== Anime ===
A 26-episode anime adaption of Nagasarete Airantō aired between April 4 and September 26, 2007. It was produced by the animation studio Feel, directed by Hideki Okamoto and written by Mamiko Ikeda. Four pieces of theme music are used for the anime: one opening theme and three ending themes. The opening theme is "Days" by Yui Horie. The first ending theme for episodes 1–12 is "Say Cheese" by Horie, the second ending theme for episode 13 is "Pu~!" by Akeno Watanabe, and the third ending theme for episodes 14–25 is "Koisuru Tenkizu" (恋する天気図) by Horie. "Days" was also used as the ending theme for episode 26.

Discotek Media, who licensed the anime, released the series on Blu-ray on May 28, 2019.

No.	Title	Original release date
1	"Drifted to Paradise?!" "Nagasarete, Tengoku (Paradaisu)" (ながされて、天国 (パラダイス))	April 4, 2007
Ikuto Tōhōin goes overboard on a ship and washes up on an island completely inhabited by women. After meeting one of the girls, Suzu, Ikuto gets ambushed by several other girls who want him as their partner, and they will try anything to obtain him. Eventually, Ikuto tries to leave the island, but discovers the island is surrounded by whirlpools, and thus it is impossible to leave the island.
2	"Being Chased After, Bridegroom" "Oikakerarete, Mukodono" (追いかけられて、婿殿)	April 11, 2007
Obaba sets up a tournament to decide who will become Ikuto's bride. The tournament is simple: The first one to touch Ikuto is the winner; the other two conditions are that the Eastern Forest is off limits and the contest ends at sunset if no winner has been decided. While initially confident, Ikuto quickly discovers he is in a lot of trouble, and Suzu helps him out most of the way.
3	"Be Useful, Freeloader" "Yakudatte, Isōrō" (役立って、居侯)	April 18, 2007
Ikuto is confident that he can do many of the daily chores the girls do everyday. Unfortunately Ikuto does not have the strength to lift vegetables (that are big in size but normal for the people on the island) the other girls can lift which leads him to depression. When Rin is eventually chased by Yukino, he saves her gaining Suzu and Rin's respect.
4	"Run and Escape, Oneesama" "Nigete no Garete, Oneesama" (にげてのがれて、お姉様)	April 25, 2007
This episode contains two separate stories. The first centers around Ayane accidentally eating her older sister's food and Ayane runs from her in fear of her sister's wrath. Machi bribes Suzu with her mother's homemade sweets and gets her to chase after Ayane while Ikuto comes along. In the second part, Suzu breaks a small statue and an evil spirit comes after her, of which she is deathly terrified. In the end it turns out to be a harmless spirit, though Ikuto does not believe it to be a spirit at all.
5	"Search, Kuma Kuma" "Sagashite, Kuma Kuma" (さがして、くまくま)	May 2, 2007
Kuma Kuma, Yukino's bear friend, goes missing and she starts to search for her with the help of Ikuto and Suzu. At first it is difficult since Ikuto cannot even differentiate between any of the bears, but then learns of a unique crescent-moon shaped marking on Kuma Kuma's chest and Ikuto draws a simple drawing of the bear to aide him in the search while Suzu helps in the search with Yukino's other animal friends.
6	"The Hot Spring is Warm" "Attakakute, Onsen" (あったかくて、温泉)	May 9, 2007
During an earthquake, the hot spring that supplies bathwater to the entire island gets blocked and must be fixed. Ikuto initially goes to the source alone, but is soon accompanied by Suzu, Yukino, and Rin who help them in removing the dirt from the well. During this time, there is another earthquake and Ikuto and Suzu fall down into a cavern and get out by breaking the rock which sealed the hot springs thus escaping and the hot springs are filled again.
7	"Nyan is My Master" "Nyandate, Oshishō-sama" (にゃんだて、お師匠様)	May 16, 2007
This episode contains two separate stories. The first has the cat lord asking Ikuto and Suzu for assistance in their contest to decide who should be the next lord of the surrounding area, the cats or the dogs. They must paint mustaches onto the dog lord so the cat lord can rule. In the second story, Ikuto goes with his friends to go see the a sakura tree in bloom. On the way he experiences hardships that he does not want to endure.
8	"Invited by the Observer" "Manekarete, Kansatsusha" (招かれて、観察者)	May 23, 2007
Ikuto and Suzu have been invited to Chikage's western-style home so that Chikage can secretly observe Ikuto since she has never had the chance to study a human male before. Chikage first dresses up in a maid uniform after referring to several books that have washed up on to the island over the years and then tries to make western-style food, but is unfamiliar with the entrees, so has trouble pleasing Ikuto's stomach; she finally makes curry rice, and Ikuto loves it. The next scene involves Ikuto taking a bath with Chikage's elephant maid Panako. Chikage spies on him without him knowing but is soon discovered when an accident happened. Later, Suzu consults Ikuto about why he can take a bath with Panako which is a female, but not her and Chikage.
9	"I Want to Charm the Successor" "Misetakute, Atotori" (魅せたくて、跡取り)	May 30, 2007
Rin invites Ikuto to help her with a construction project, hoping to use this opportunity to impress him as well, though she is oblivious to the fact that Ikuto has no trouble recognizing her feminine qualities. During the project, Mikoto who fancies Rin repeatedly tries to hurt Ikuto as he gets closer to Rin. Ikuto gets worked up when Mikoto challenges him to a duel to see who is better at building. The house gets completed quickly with their hard work. Meanwhile, Suzu, having observed the interaction between Rin and Ikuto, is starting to see what it means to fall in love with someone.
10	"The Rain is My Friend!" "Ame Datte, Tomodachi!" (雨だって、友だち!)	June 6, 2007
A rainy day means that everyone on the island can take a day off. However, Ikuto cannot sit still for long since he is used to going to work regardless of the weather outside. Ikuto notices how Suzu's personality has changed, and finally finds out that rainy days remind Suzu of her now dead mother. Later, Suzu's friends decide to pay Suzu a visit as they often do during rainy days. Together with Ikuto, they provide Suzu with much-appreciated company.
11	"Taking Ice to Ease the Fever" "Hyakkokute, Kōritori" (ひゃっこくて、氷とり)	June 13, 2007
Ikuto wakes up to find that Suzu has a fever. He is told by her grandmother to get ice, but finds out that all the island's stored ice has been eaten by Kuma-Kuma, Kamo-Kamo, and Kagami (Yukino's mother). Thus, he has to go to the island's mountain Mt. Fuji to get some. After going all the way up the mountain and back again in one day, he finds that Suzu is completely recovered, but he himself has a fever from the changes in temperature and fatigue.
12	"It is Delicious, Bride Training" "Oishikute, Hanayome Shugyō" (おいしくて、花嫁修行)	June 20, 2007
Machi gets scolded by Ayane for not being able to cook, and that a bride needs to know how to cook. Thus, Machi spends the day learning how to cook from Rin. Afterwards, she invites Ikuto and Suzu for dinner, though as Ikuto and Suzu arrive at the gates, a weak Rin warns them not to eat her food before passing out. The two run for their lives before being captured by Machi's Shikigamis. She soon forces them to eat dinner which, despite the bad look, is delicious, but the drawback is she prepared so much that they eventually pass out from stomach pains.
13	"I Want to Meet You, Ikuto" "Aitakute, Ikuto" (会いたくて、行人)	June 27, 2007
It's Tonkatsu's birthday and Suzu is preparing tofu. Later she and Ayane discover a photo which they believe is Ikuto's "lover" from his world. When Ikuto is discovered staring out at sea Ayane and the others all dress up to charm him. Suzu discovers that he has planned to leave the island and goes after Ikuto. He then tells her that it is his sister's birthday and that he was going to send a letter to her. Ikuto then helps Suzu with the tofu and everyone came to help celebrate Tonkatsu's birthday. During the end credits, a song by Tonkatsu replaces the usual ending theme, consisting only of "Pu"s. After the credits, Suzu helps Ikuto send off the letter in a bottle by encouraging him to throw it past the whirpools. Upon success, their relationship becomes noticeably stronger.
14	"The Embarrassed, Costumed Animal Character" "Hazukashikute, Kigurumi" (はずかしくて、着ぐるみ)	July 4, 2007
An unknown robber is stealing food from many people on the island and Machi is initially suspected due to her stealing other food amid her naturally evil behavior. After some investigating, Ikuto discovers a pattern to where the robber is stealing from, and he and his friends stake out the next two houses they expect to be hit next. In the same night, both houses get robbed by two separate culprits, but they both get away. Later, Ikuto and Suzu are going home to sleep, but one of the robbers is inside taking a bath. After some explanation, the robber introduces herself as Mei Mei who had recently washed up on the island during a storm with her friend Tona. Now Ikuto and Suzu must protect Mei Mei for the time being while they try to track down Tona.
15	"Trying to Improve, Mei Mei" "Naoshitakutte, Mei Mei" (直したくって、梅梅)	July 11, 2007
Ikuto and Suzu turn an old waterwheel house into Mei Mei and Tohna's new house. Mei Mei, due to her chronic shyness, is having difficulty interacting with the island's other residents. Ikuto and Suzu attempt to cheer her up and help her adapt. Ayane later arrives and gives Mei Mei a 'pep talk'. During the conversation she notices Tohna and seems to show a puzzling recognition of him. However, when Ayane realizes Tohna is a Kappa, she takes off screaming. Tohna believing that Ayane has seen other kappa before pursues her. This leads to a high-speed pursuit around the island. Mei Mei sees that Ayane is about to run over a cliff and uses her acrobatic skills to stop her. The group later learns that Machi would dress up like a kappa to scare Ayane, causing her phobia. Several of the others arrive to cheer up Mei Mei, and the shy girl thanks them all and promises to do better.
16	"Let's Get the Territory Back, Leader" "Kachitotte, Ō no Za" (勝ち取って、王の座)	July 18, 2007
When the South Leader comes into the West Leader's territory to deliver a message to the West Leader, he tells Suzu and Ikuto that the East leader had gotten beaten. They are all in shock. The former East Leader goes to get revenge but sees Mei Mei and falls in love with her and says that the rematch does not matter. Then the former North Leader shows up and stops the former East Leader from running away. Suzu and Ikuto find out from the former North Leader that Mei Mei is the new North Leader and must return to the Northern Forest. However Ikuto will not let the former North Leader take her there so he decides to fight him. Ikuto gets beaten up through most of the fight and Suzu and Mei Mei try to either end the fight or try to fight the former North Leader, but Ikuto does not let them. Ikuto gets some assistance from a shadowy figure and wins the fight. Come to find out it was one of the new Leaders, which looks like a chicken, and the former North Leader returns to the Northern Forest.
17	"Changing, Magic" "Torikaete, Mahō" (とりかえて、魔法)	July 25, 2007
Chikage found a magic book and decided to use the spell locked in it. One morning Ikuto woke up and saw Suzu as a cat while Ikuto was a dog. Ikuto finally figure it out that humans turned into animals while the animals turned into humans. Along the way they meet their friends that turned into animals. They found out that it was Chikage who was responsible. Before Chikage attempts to demonstrate her magic on a hapless Ikuto, Panako, who was turned into a human, appears. Still maintaining her elephantine strength, Panako throws a huge rock at Chikage because she broke a promise to Panako, destroying the book and returning everyone to normal. Because Ikuto was rendered unconscious through part of the ordeal, upon waking up, he thought it everything that happened was a dream.
18	"Let's Have A Match, Ninja" "Teawaseshite, Ninja" (手合わせして、忍者)	August 1, 2007
Shinobu, one of three sisters that is a ninja, receives a notice that there is a strong swordsman back in the village where she came from named IKUTO. The rumors that she heard is that he made a 100 dolls just by cutting a tree, can cut a rock with a wooden sword, and that he can depart a waterfall with one strike. She also heard that he beat North Leader so she heads out to fight him. Ikuto and Suzu find Shinobu on their way out and take her back to their house to feed her. Shinobu then declares that she will not leave his side until he fights with her. Finally it goes so far that a jealous Suzu tells Ikuto to accept her challenge. The battle begins and the two nearly equal. Shinobu is fast but Ikuto had proper techniques. Shinobu trips and Ikuto goes to catch her but his hands touch her breasts. Shinobu is in shock and can't walk or stand up. Ikuto wins the fight just with the touch.
19	"Wrapped in Mystery, Detective (Part One)" "Nazomeite, Tantei (Zenpen)" (謎めいて、探偵 (前編))	August 8, 2007
Ikuto and Suzu are invited to a hotspring resort. They are greeted by Sakuya, a mechanical doll built 130 years ago. Soon the others arrive and begin to start a competition for bathing with Ikuto. Suddenly, the masked fiend Beniyasha appears. Who is this masked man?
20	"Wrapped in Mystery, Detective (Part Two)" "Nazomeite, Tantei (Kōhen)" (謎めいて、探偵 (後編))	August 15, 2007
Beniyasha has succeeded in taking out the girls one by one, except for Rin and Machi who were distracted. Though none are hurt, his "attacks" cause many problems and nosebleeds for Ikuto. After a rooftop confrontation, Ikuto tries to chase after him. Unknown to everyone else, it was actually Chikage's mother in disguise. She and her daughter had a talk about him and how he could be the master of the next generation. This could mean the ninja clan that Chikage and her mother come from.
21	"Being Deceived, Ponpoko" "Bakasarete, Ponpoko" (化かされて、ポンポコ)	August 22, 2007
Ayane is out searching for her sister and Ayane thinks that Machi is with Ikuto. We then find out that Machi was hiding in the bushes. She walks into a statue and knocks a seal off of the statue and a 2-tailed shape shifting raccoon appears. Machi is then in search for the 2 tailed raccoon so that she can seal it back up. The only feature that gives away is its belly button is bulged out and has a white X on it. Suzu and the others help trying to find it. When Suzu and Machi are sitting with Ikuto Suzu keeps saying it is impossible and Ikuto keeps agreeing that it is impossible(?). Suzu then grabs Ikuto and says that they have the 2-tailed raccoon captured. They seal up that raccoon for another one thousand years.
22	"Being Discovered, Blue Bird" "Mitsuketakutte, Aoitori" (見つけたくって、青い鳥)	August 29, 2007
Yukino is walking home from the forest and sees the mysterious blue bird that is mentioned in a fairy tale. Yukino see Suzu and drags her along to go find the mysterious blue bird. They end up not finding it, but finding another bird that has never been seen before. The bird is small and a gray color (this is the blue birds other form). They chase the bird and end up falling into a cave and can't climb out. Suzu gets injured on the fall. Ikuto goes in search for Suzu and Yukino. While Ikuto is out searching for them it starts raining; then all of a sudden Ikuto hears his name being called and stops. The blue bird appears and takes him to Suzu and Yukino. Rin, Ikuto and others help get them out of the cave. Ikuto thanks them and then Suzu and Ikuto start home. Ikuto then finds out that Suzu is hurt and gets mad at her; however, Ikuto says that Suzu is his family on the island and Suzu becomes extremely happy. Ikuto ends up carrying her on his back.
23	"Bring Me Along, Elementary School" "Tsureteitte, Terakoya" (つれていって、寺子屋)	September 5, 2007
Suzu hates studying so much that she runs away from the school building or away for even mentioning school or studying. Ikuto and all the others come up with a plan to lure her there so that she can study with them. When they all arrive she runs away again and Ikuto runs after her to say come back and give it a try. When Ikuto throws Tonkatsu at Suzu to stop her; she dodges it and falls on Ikuto's face and he plays dead until she starts to walk by and he grabs her foot. Ikuto takes off her boot and tickles Suzu's foot until she gives up and agrees to go back with him. She ends up finding out that he is a teacher and she gets excited. After the credits Suzu and Ikuto are going over numbers multiplied by two. When she gets "9*2=18", Ikuto says good job and gives her his portion of her favorite food.
24	"Drifted Away, Message Bottle" "Nagaretsuite, Binzume" (流れついて、瓶詰)	September 12, 2007
While Suzu was collecting seaweed by the coast, a bottle drifts ashore. Upon looking at it, she immediately presumed that it was the bottle that Ikuto had sent to his sister Misaki. She came back home to show it to Ikuto, and while reading the letter, it read that his sister went off to the sea to try to find Ikuto, but has gotten lost; therefore, Ikuto, Suzu and the other girls attempt different ways to get Ikuto out of the island to find Misaki.
25	"Being Forged, Petty One" "Kitaete, Henachoko" (鍛えて、へなちょこ)	September 19, 2007
Suzu and Ikuto search for a key that would open a special gate to a Sea Dragon God, but the leaders of the North, South, East and West try to intervene on Ikuto's quest for the key.
26	"Springing Out, Airan Island" "Tobidashite, Airantō" (飛び出して、藍蘭島)	September 26, 2007
Ikuto and Suzu arrive on a small nearby island to the cave and gate where the Sea Dragon God sleeps, in which the dragon can send Ikuto off the island and to find his sister Misaki. After meeting her and learning she's safely living on a male version of Airantou, he makes the decision to go back to the island much to her dismay. Upon his return, he is welcomed by all the girls on the island and Obaba informs Ikuto that he will have to go through another tournament that would decide which of the girls on the island would be his bride. The story ends with Ikuto being chased by all of the girls on the island.

== Reception ==
As of March 2018, the manga had 3.9 million copies in circulation.
