= Rocket Girls (novel series) =

Japanese light novel series and its adaptation

ロケットガール (Roketto Gāru)
- Genre: Adventure, Comedy, Science fiction
- Light novel
- Written by: Hōsuke Nojiri
- Published by: Fujimi Shobo
- English publisher: Viz Media
- Imprint: Fujimi Fantasia Bunko
- Magazine: Monthly Dragon Magazine
- Original run: March 25, 1995 – August 25, 2007
- Volumes: 4
- Anime television series
- Directed by: Hiroshi Aoyama
- Written by: Rika Nakase
- Music by: Shinkichi Mitsumune
- Studio: Mook Animation; DLE
- Licensed by: NA: Sentai Filmworks
- Original network: WOWOW
- Original run: February 21, 2007 – May 17, 2007
- Episodes: 12
- icon

Rocket Girls (Japanese: ロケットガール, Hepburn: Roketto Gāru) is a Japanese light novel series by Hōsuke Nojiri. Set in the Solomon Islands, it follows the exploits of high-school girl Yukari Morita, who is pressed into service as an astronaut by a private Japanese space company called the Solomon Space Association when it is unable to build a rocket that can lift the weight of an adult male.

Rocket Girls was adapted into a 12-episode anime television series that aired between February and May 2007. It was produced with the assistance of the Japan Aerospace Exploration Agency, which included astronaut Naoko Yamazaki voicing herself in Episode 7. Bandai Entertainment had the license and released a subtitled-only Complete Collection DVD on October 28, 2008, before it closed its doors in 2011. Sentai Filmworks announced on September 27, 2018, that it would release the series on a subtitled-only SD-BD set on January 15, 2019.

== Characters ==
- Morita Yukari (Sendai Eri)
- Matsuri (Nabatame Hitomi)
- Miura Akane (Hasegawa Shizuka)
- Morita Hiroko (Natsuki Rio)
- Morita Hiroshi (Cho-, born Nagashima Yuuichi)
- Nasuda Isao (Sugou Takayuki)

More characters are listed in the Japanese Wikipedia article: ja:ロケットガール.

== Spacecraft ==
=== LS-5 Rocket ===
Height	Diameter	Liftoff mass	Liftoff thrust	Payload to LEO
21.0m	2.4m	116.6t	140.0t	1.1t

The LS-5 is a multistage expendable rocket used by the Solomon Space Association (SSA) to launch the first Japanese crewed spaceflight. It consists of a central body with a single engine, flanked by two booster thrusters. It does not appear to have an upper stage; the capsule and its service module are mounted directly on the central body via a conical inter-stage skirt.

A second version with four booster thrusters appeared at the end of the series to carry a tandem two-seater version of the space capsule.

Although older than the LS-7, this rocket has had more successful launches. This rocket was also used to test the new hybrid-fuel. Three rockets of this type has been constructed so far. Their Command Module (CM) have been called Tanpopo (Dandelion) and Coconut.

=== LS-7 Rocket ===
Height	Diameter	Liftoff mass	Liftoff thrust	Payload to LEO
31.0m	2.5m	259.2t	328.0t	2.3t

The LS-7 was a multistage expendable rocket used by the Solomon Space Association (SSA). However, after several failed launches, the rocket was retired and replaced by the older LS-5. In the anime, this rocket is a line-for-line copy of the H-IIA rocket.

== List of light novels ==
#	Title		Japan	
#	English	Japanese	Release date	ISBN
01	High School Girl, Lift off!	女子高生、リフトオフ!	March 1995	ISBN 4-8291-2618-3
01	High School Girl, Lift off!	女子高生、リフトオフ!	October 2006	ISBN 4-8291-1851-2
02	Angels' Well that Ends Well	天使は結果オーライ	December 1996	ISBN 4-8291-2723-6
02	Angels' Well that Ends Well	天使は結果オーライ	November 2006	ISBN 4-8291-1875-X
03	Fly to the Moon with Me	私と月につきあって	August 1999	ISBN 4-8291-2896-8
03	Fly to the Moon with Me	私と月につきあって	January 2007	ISBN 978-4-8291-1882-5
04	Rendezvous with the Witch	魔法使いとランデブー	August 2007	ISBN 978-4-8291-1919-8

The anime adaptation covers titles 1 and 2.

Viz Media released the first volume with English translation in 2010. ISBN 978-1-4215-3642-2

== Episode list ==
No.	Title	Original release date
1	"Destiny" (ディスティニィ)	February 21, 2007
Yukari Morita secretly visits the Solomon Islands during summer vacation to search for her missing father, Hiroshi, who disappeared on her mother's honeymoon. Meanwhile, the Solomon Islands Space Association (SSA) latest rocket, the LS7 has another launch failure. If they don't succeed soon, their budget will get canceled. The SSA director, Nasuda Isao, meets Yukari after tracking down an escaped astronaut. He talks her into becoming an astronaut on the LS5, a more reliable rocket that does not have enough power to lift a full adult.
2	"Assembly" (アッセンブリ)	February 28, 2007
Nasuda offers to help Yukari search for her father while she works for him as an astronaut, telling her "It's so simple even monkeys can do it!" Her acceptance is followed by embarrassing medical examinations, continuous training, live-fire weapons training, and the discovery she has to wear a 3 millimeters thick spacesuit. During her survival jungle training she finds a local tribe led by her long lost father. As a delay tactic, he promises to return to Japan with her if Yukari agrees to go on one space mission. Yukari also meets Matsuri, her half sister. The director quickly recruits her to be Yukari's backup astronaut.
3	"Launch Pad" (ランチパッド)	March 7, 2007
Tests of the new rocket fuel go consistently and catastrophically wrong, but the director hides the events from Yukari and Matsuri. With Matsuri now an astronaut trainee, Yukari attempts to gain weight and show a poor attitude in order to be kicked off the program.
4	"Count Down" (カウントダウン)	March 14, 2007
Yukari suddenly decides to take a hands-on attitude to her job, and gains entry to the capsule construction site. She learns of the conservative philosophy of space vehicle construction. When she then finds out about the radical and unsuccessful fuel tests, she begins a hunger strike.
5	"Ignition" (イグニッション)	March 21, 2007
Yukari's unshakable mother arrives and sets the agenda for the upcoming launches. Yukari and Matsuri are introduced to the media ahead of the first launch, which is repeatedly delayed.
6	"Control" (コントロール)	March 28, 2007
During the first mission, Yukari's capsule suffers a serious problem. Matsuri is launched in another rocket to provide some extra oxygen as the ground crew tries to determine a solution.
7	"Gravity" (グラヴィティ)	April 5, 2007
The astronauts land in Yukari's old high school. Akane, a top student at the school, provides vital help in preserving one of the space experiments taken on the first launch. As Yukari has fulfilled her promise of going into space once, she plans to go back to school just as Akane, impressed by Yukari's attitude and accomplishments, expresses a desire to go to space.
8	"Separation" (セパレーション)	April 12, 2007
Akane starts astronaut training, but she fails a number of physical tests.
9	"Kick Motor" (キックモーター)	April 19, 2007
Yukari is heartbroken at hearing that Akane left the training program, but the director and the rest of the SSA staff are actually hiding the truth from her.
10	"Orbiter" (オービター)	April 26, 2007
The United States space shuttle Atlantis is preparing to launch the Pluto probe Orpheus, but they lose a vital part within the tight confines of the probe and are unable to extract it. The SSA begins planning a rescue mission using their new two person capsule named Mangosteen.
11	"Turn Start" (ターンスタート)	May 10, 2007
Akane is able to extract the part, and she and Yukari earn the respect of the Atlantis crew. But the Orpheus launches due to a testing fault, and ends up in a very deep orbit, unable to begin its mission. The crews of the Atlantis and Mangosteen create a desperate plan to rescue the probe.
12	"Rocket Girls" (ロケットガール)	May 17, 2007
Yukari and Akane reach the Orpheus, but the return trip may be too much for the Mangosteen.

=== OP/ED songs ===
- Opening: "RISE" by ICHIKO
- Ending (#1): "Ashite Iki no Bus ni Notte" by misae (eps. 1–11)
- Ending (#2): "Waratte!" ("Smile!") by ICHIKO (ep. 12)
