= Sekihiko Inui =

Japanese manga artist

Sekihiko Inui (犬威赤彦, Inui Sekihiko; born March 26) is a Japanese manga artist. He is best known for Murder Princess and the manga adaptation of Comic Party, the latter which he drew upon his own experiences as a dōjinshi creator at Comiket. His most recent series, Ratman, ended in 2013.

== Works ==
1. Comic Party (5 volumes. issuance of the final volume in March 2005, ISBN 4-840-230-137) MediaWorks
2. Murder Princess (2005年 10月, ISBN 4-8402-3160-5) メディアワークス PRINCESS Murder (2005 Mon 10, ISBN 4-8402-3160-5) MediaWorks
3. Gensou Shuugi -FANTASISM- 幻想主義 (2006年4月、 ISBN 4-04-713812-6) 角川コミックス・エース Fantasy principle (2006 Mon 4, ISBN 4-047-138-126) Kadokawa Comics Ace
4. Ratman (2007年8月号 – 2013年8月号) 月刊少年エース Ratman (August 2007 to August 2013) Shōnen Ace
5. Date A Live (2014年1月号 – 2014年12月号、原作：橘公司、キャラクター原案：つなこ ) 月刊少年エース (Written by Kōshi Tachibana with illustrated by Tsunako) Shōnen Ace
