= Usagi-chan de Cue!! =

Japanese manga series

- First tankōbon volume cover

うさぎちゃんで CUE!! (Usagi-chan de Kyū!!)
- Genre: Action, erotic comedy
- Manga
- Written by: Takashi Sano
- Published by: Shōnen Gahōsha
- Magazine: Young King OURs
- Original run: 1998 – 2000
- Volumes: 2
- Original video animation
- Directed by: Tooru Yoshida
- Produced by: Koutarou Ran
- Written by: Hideaki Hirano
- Music by: Susumu Ueda
- Studio: Chaos Project
- Released: November 9, 2001 – April 26, 2002
- Runtime: 26 minutes
- Episodes: 3
- icon

Usagi-chan de Cue!! (Japanese: うさぎちゃんで CUE!!, Hepburn: Usagi-chan de Kyū!!; lit. Bunny in Cue!!) is a Japanese manga series written and illustrated by Takashi Sano. It was serialized in Shōnen Gahosha's seinen manga magazine Young King OURs from 1998 to 2000, with its chapters collected in two tankōbon volumes. A three-episode original video animation (OVA) adaptation produced by Pink Pineapple and animated by Chaos Project was released from 2001 to 2002.

== Plot summary ==
Mikami Inaba was fighting a person from another school on her school's rooftop. As they fought, her friend Haru appeared. Seeing Mikami distracted, the man charged at her, causing both of them to break the nearby rabbit cages and fall off the roof. As Mikami fell, she desperately grabbed the rabbit. Suddenly, a flash of pink light appeared. Mikami fused with the rabbit, and gained another personality, called Mimika. Now, Mikami only appears when various people threaten her and her friends. Otherwise, she takes on the form of the innocent, happy-go-lucky Mimika. She gains an incredibly voluptuous body, including an unfeasibly huge bosom. The story continues with the plot of an evil organization trying to uncover the power that causes merging.

== Characters ==
=== Protagonists ===
Haru Matogi
Voiced by: Kenichi Suzumura
A high school boy who took care of Mimika when she was a rabbit, and takes care of her after she and Mikami merge. He is childhood friends with Miku.
Miku Mizuki
Voiced by: Ayako Kawasumi
Haru's lifelong friend who has a crush on him. Since she was with Haru when Mimika and Mikami merged, she is immune to the effects of her ears. She gets incredibly jealous of Mimika, and tries to get Haru to notice her own, substantial bust.
Mikami Inaba
Voiced by: Kaoru Morota
The toughest fighter in the school until she merged with Mimika. She has long, dark brown hair, red eyes and a buxom figure. After the merge, she only appears when there is danger, albeit with black rabbit ears. Her rabbit-eared form wears similar gloves to Mimika's, though Mikami's are black.
Mimika
Voiced by: Kaoru Morota
Once a rabbit, she merged with Mikami and became the dominant personality. She is incredibly outgoing and carefree. She is also in love with Haru, and showers him with affection whenever possible, sometimes going beyond the bounds of common decency. Her ears are capable of sending out signals that tell most people she is human and that her presence is normal, allowing her to integrate herself into Haru's school with her classmates believing that she has always been there.
Though she has inherited Mikami's looks, she is easily distinguishable from Mikami as she has blonde hair, buckteeth and an even larger bust. She also wears white gloves, in contrast to Mikami's black gloves.

=== Antagonists ===
Chou of Benten
Voiced by: Ryūsei Nakao
A man who has merged with a dog and is part of some unknown evil organization. His headband changes every time it is shown. He brought Dekao to fight Mikami before she merged. He can change between human form and dog form.
Dekao
A fighter that fell off the roof of school, while fighting Mikami in the first episode. He was remade as a cyborg with rockets and increased strength.
Koshka Nekoi
Voiced by: Michiko Neya
A golden-eyed cat-girl, her name is taken from the Russian and Japanese words for cat. She can also emit special signals, it is unclear if they work on Haru, Miku, and Mimika. Like Mimika, she joins Haru's class.
Boss
The head of the organization, he is only seen as someone with an abnormally large head.
The Organization
A mysterious force with the initials SP or PS. They are trying to harness the power of merging.

== Media ==
=== Manga ===
Written and illustrated by Takashi Sano, Usagi-chan de Cue!! was serialized in Shōnen Gahosha's seinen manga magazine Young King OURs from the July 1998 to the November 2000 issues. Shōnen Gahosha collected its chapters in two tankōbon volumes, released in April 1999 and November 2000.

=== Original video animation ===
A three-episode original video animation (OVA) adaptation produced by Pink Pineapple and animated by Chaos Project was released from November 9, 2001, to April 26, 2002.
