= Shrine of the Morning Mist =

Japanese manga series

- First tankōbon volume cover

朝霧の巫女 (Asagiri no Miko)
- Genre: Comedy; Magical girl; Slice of life
- Manga
- Written by: Hiroki Ugawa
- Published by: Shōnen Gahōsha
- English publisher: AUS: Madman Entertainment; NA: Tokyopop
- Magazine: Young King OURs
- Original run: March 2000 – April 2013
- Volumes: 9
- Anime television series
- Directed by: Yuji Moriyama
- Music by: Tsuneyoshi Saito
- Studio: Chaos Project; Gansis
- Licensed by: NA: Media Blasters
- Original network: TV Tokyo, AT-X
- Original run: July 4, 2002 – December 26, 2002
- Episodes: 26

Shrine of the Morning Mist (Japanese: 朝霧の巫女, Hepburn: Asagiri no Miko; lit. "Miko of Asagiri") is a Japanese manga written and illustrated by Hiroki Ugawa. The manga was serialized in Shōnen Gahōsha's Young King Ours. It was licensed in North America by Tokyopop and in Australia and New Zealand by Madman Entertainment. The manga was adapted into an anime series, directed by Yuji Moriyama. The anime was licensed in North America by Media Blasters.

It tells the story of Yuzu Hieda, a high school freshman and one of three sisters, all of whom are miko at the local Shinto shrine. When her childhood love returns, it is discovered that dark gods have a great interest in him, and Yuzu is recruited to gather fellow students into a "Miko Council" to fight off a full-scale mystic assault. The priestesses have talismans that focus their powers and are used when attacking the dark kami.

== Characters ==
=== The Miko Council ===
In the Media Blasters anime English adaptation, the Miko Council is referred to as the "Priestess Club".

Yuzu Hieda (稗田 柚子, Hieda Yuzu)
Voiced by: Ai Shimizu (Japanese); Zoe Martin (English)
She is the middle sister of the Hieda clan, all of whom have trained to be Shinto priestesses. She is a powerful mystic, but naive. She is fixated on her childhood friend Tadahiro, believing they are destined to be together. Her talisman is a ceremonial dagger. Her attack is called "white light beam." She is the leader of the priestess club.
Seiko Rikiishi (力石 征子, Rikiishi Seiko)
Voiced by: Kaoru Morota (Japanese); Caroline Lawson (English)
Yuzu's best friend and first recruit to the Miko Council. She is enthusiastic but unlucky with boys. She pretends to be more worldly than Yuzu when in reality she is just as naive. Her talisman item is a spear. Her attack name is "brave girl spear" but Izumi Sakibara thought it was "brave spear girl".
Chika Yurikasa (百合草 千佳, Yurikusa Chika)
Voiced by: Nanae Katou (Japanese); Bella Hudson (English)
Although she is the same age as the other girls, she has a body that resembles that of a ten-year-old. She has a cutting, nasty streak and never hesitates to speak her mind. Her talisman is a tamagushi, a ritual wand made of a branch with leaves. Her attack is called "lyrical flash," but before that it was "moon tornado defusion."
Izumi Sakibara (岬原 いずみ, Sakibara Izumi)
Voiced by: Rie Kanda (Japanese); Alissa Brodsky (English)
A bespectacled girl who is obsessed with UFOs and aliens, and convinced there is a connection between UFOs and the demon invasion. She thinks Chika is extremely cute and loses no opportunity to glomp her, much to Chika's disgust. Her talisman item is a set of ofuda. Her attack is called "secret weopon tachiyon plasma boomerang."
Shizuka Midoh (御堂 志津歌, Midō Shizuka)
Voiced by: Sayaka Ohara (Japanese); Rachael Lillis (English)
A quiet, demure and extremely wealthy girl who hero-worships Yuzu. She tries very hard to be the epitome of Japanese femininity. Her talisman is a ceremonial fan. Her attack is called "tornado blast."

=== The Hieda Clan ===
Kurako Hieda (稗田 倉子, Hieda Kurako)
Voiced by: Megumi Hayashibara (Japanese); Rosie Reyes (English)
The Asagiri Shrine's head priestess, the Miko Council's mentor, and Yuzu's homeroom teacher and older sister. She is extremely knowledgeable and intensely disciplined. She puts the council (including her sister, who is already a priestess) through continual, rigorous training that borders on the sadistic. Her talisman items are a bow (she is a skilled archer) and a large ring that can encircle foes.
Tama Hieda (稗田 珠, Hieda Tama)
Voiced by: Shizuka Hasegawa (Japanese); Tara Sands (English)
The youngest Hieda sister and a priestess-in-training. She takes a perverse glee in teasing her sister about Tadahiro but is basically kind and loving. Her talisman items are a pair of hand chimes.
Naonori Hieda (稗田 直範, Hieda Naonori)
Voiced by: Hideyuki Umezu (Japanese); Sean Schemmel (English)
The father of the Hieda sisters. He lives at the shrine but does not appear to be a priest; his job is unknown but apparently exhausting. His principal problems are a distrust of Tadahiro's intentions towards Yuzu and the tendency of the rest of the family to almost completely ignore him.
Tadahiro Amatsu (天津 忠尋, Amatsu Tadahiro)
Voiced by: Takahiro Mizushima (Japanese); Sebastian Arcelus (English)
The cousin of the Hieda sisters. A boy Yuzu's age, he is her childhood friend and they have been carrying a torch for each other for five years. Tadahiro has the power to see the spirit world through his left eye, which is a different color from the right, and is a target of the demons by consequence.
Koma (こま)
Voiced by: Yui Horie (Japanese); Shannon Conley (English)
A bakeneko or "demon cat" who protected Tadahiro's grandfather. She normally appears as an ordinary black cat but can take human and cat-woman forms to fight. She has an alarming fondness for cake.

=== Yagarena ===
Michimune Ayatachi (乱裁 道宗, Ayatachi Michimune)
Voiced by: Ryotaro Okiayu (Japanese); Marc Diraison (English)
An ancient sorcerer who serves Yagarena, a dark god who wishes to return to the Earth and plunge Japan into darkness. He has the power to summon demons from just about anything, which he uses to menace Tadahiro and Yuzu.
The Twilight Priestesses (黄昏の巫女, Tasogare no Miko)
Are three "dark miko" recruited by Michimune to fight the Miko Council. Their spiritual powers are roughly equal to those of the Miko Council, but their skill is greater.
Kukuri Shirayama (白山 菊里, Shirayama Kukuri)
- Voiced by: Chinami Nishimura (Japanese); Eva Christensen (English)
Mizuho Hamaji (浜路 瑞穂, Hamaji Mizuho)
- Voiced by: Mayumi Asano (Japanese); Mollie Weaver (English)
Yukie Uranami (浦波 雪絵, Uranami Yukie)
- Voiced by: Yoko Sasaki (Japanese); Kerry Williams (English)
Masashi Kusugi (楠木 正志, Kusugi Masashi)
Voiced by: Ryotaro Okiayu (Japanese); Marc Diraison (English)
A handsome student in Yuzu and Tadahiro's class. Although popular, he is arrogant and cutting and does everything in his power to hamper and humiliate Yuzu. Chika took some pictures that led her to believe he was having a romance with Tadahiro. In reality, Kusugi is a disguise used by Michimune to infiltrate the school and hamper his enemies.

== Setting ==
The real-life city of Miyoshi, Hiroshima was used as the basis for the location of the anime. Miyoshi has an abundance of mist in the morning (hence the series' title), and the folktales recorded in Inō Mononoke scroll (which inspired much of the anime's story) took place on a mountain near Miyoshi City. The mountain appears prominently in Shrine of the Morning Mist.

== Media ==
=== Manga ===
Shrine of the Morning Mist is written and illustrated by Hiroki Ugawa. Shōnen Gahōsha released the manga's nine tankōbon volumes between January 2001 and April 30, 2013. The manga was licensed in North America by Tokyopop, which released the manga's first four tankōbon volumes between May 9, 2006, and May 1, 2007, as of July 2009. The series is licensed in France as Asagiri - Les prêtresses de l'aube by Editions Ki-oon.

=== Volume listing ===
| No. | Original release date | Original ISBN | English release date | English ISBN |
|---|---|---|---|---|
| 1 | January 2001 | 978-4-785-92060-9 | May 9, 2006 | 978-1-598-16343-8 |
Chapter 1 - Homecoming; Chapter 2 - Mist; Part 1 Part 2: Chapter 3 - Freeloader; Chapter 4 - Pre-Eminent Strangeness; Part 1 Part 2 Part 3: Chapter 5 - Before the Grave; Part 1 Part 2
| 2 | September 2001 | 978-4-785-92122-4 | September 5, 2006 | 978-1-598-16344-5 |
Chapter 6 - School Entrance Ceremony; Part 1 Part 2 Part 3: Chapter 7 - The Priestess Committee; Part 1 Part 2 Part 3: Chapter 8 - The Fourth Apparition; Part 1 Part 2 Part 3: Chapter 9 - Rooftop
| 3 | July 31, 2002 | 978-4-785-92206-1 | January 2, 2007 | 978-1-598-16345-2 |
Chapter 10 - Culture Festival; Part 1 Part 2 Part 3 Part 4: Chapter 11 - Amatsu Hikone no Kami; Part 1 Part 2 Part 3 Part 4: Chapter 12 - Atsuta; Part 1 Part 2 Part 3
| 4 | January 16, 2004 | 978-4-785-92389-1 | May 1, 2007 | 978-1-598-16346-9 |
Chapter 13 - Kukuri; Part 1 Part 2 Part 3 Part 4 Part 5: Chapter 14 - Change of Dress; Part 1 Part 2: Chapter 15 - Hirata; Part 1 Part 2 Part 3 Part 4 Part 5 Part 6 Part 7
| 5 | December 27, 2007 | 978-4-785-92896-4 | — | — |
| 6 | December 28, 2009 | 978-4-785-93286-2 | — | — |
| 7 | January 31, 2011 | 978-4-785-93558-0 | — | — |
| 8 | May 17, 2012 | 978-4-785-93853-6 | — | — |
| 9 | April 30, 2013 | 978-4-785-94010-2 | — | — |

=== Anime ===
The episodes of Shrine of the Morning Mist anime series are based on the manga written by Hiroki Ugawa. The anime series was directed by Yuji Moriyama. There were 26 episodes broadcast by TV Tokyo and AT-X between July 4, 2002, and December 26, 2002. Media Blasters licensed and released the series for a Blu-Ray Disc release.

== Reception ==
IGN's A.E. Sparrow criticises the manga for making Tadahiro "possibly the most boring character written in the history of manga. He looks and behaves with all the emotional range of a Ken doll, despite being the core character around which the action revolves."

T.H.E.M. Anime Reviews' Jeremy A Beard comments that comedy of the anime "employs a lot of silly school life misunderstandings and visual gags that reminded me of something like Azumanga Daioh." Anime News Network's Sean Broestl commends the anime for its "great character design, catchy opening [and the] comedy isn't overdone" but he criticises the episodes for feeling "rushed" and the "mediocre plot." Mania.com's Chris Beveridge comments on the anime's "half-length episodes" due to it being aired on TV Tokyo as the second half of Nekketsu Denpa Club, saying, "the show makes decent use of the format and the pacing is certainly much better than a lot of shows that were trying out this format a few years ago, but there's still something slightly off about how it plays out and roughly half of the episodes feel like they're either a bit rushed or they don't end in what you'd consider an appropriate place."
