= Comic Party =

Japanese dating sim video game

- Box art of original Comic Party

こみっくパーティー (Komikku Pātī)
- Genre: Comedy
- Video game
- Developer: Leaf (Windows); Aquaplus (DC/DCE/PSP)
- Publisher: Leaf (Windows); Aquaplus (DC/DCE/PSP)
- Genre: Eroge, AVG, SLG
- Platform: Windows, Dreamcast, PSP
- Released: May 28, 1999: Windows; JP: May 28, 1999; JP: May 30, 2003 (DCE) Dreamcast; JP: August 9, 2001; JP: October 17, 2002 (DreKore) PlayStation Portable; JP: December 29, 2005
- Manga
- Written by: Sekihiko Inui
- Published by: MediaWorks
- English publisher: AUS: Madman Entertainment; NA: Tokyopop
- Magazine: Dengeki Daioh
- Original run: January 2001 – March 2005
- Volumes: 5
- Anime television series
- Directed by: Norihiko Sudo
- Produced by: Shukichi Kanda; Takao Asaga; Toshiaki Okuno
- Written by: Hiroshi Yamaguchi
- Music by: Kazuo Nobuta
- Studio: OLM Team Iguchi
- Licensed by: NA: Right Stuf Inc. (2002–2014); Discotek Media (2014–present)
- Original network: TKV, CTC, WTV
- English network: US: Anime Network (2007)
- Original run: April 2, 2001 – June 25, 2001
- Episodes: 13 + 4 specials
- Anime television series

Comic Party Revolution
- Directed by: Junichi Sakata (#1–4); Mitsuhiro Tōgō (#5–13)
- Produced by: Motoki Ueda (#1–4); Yutaro Mochizuki; Takayuki Nagatani; Takayuki Matsunaga; Keikō Omori
- Written by: Hideo Tsukinaga (#1–4); Takamitsu Kono (#5–13); Toru Nozaki (#5–13); Yasunori Yamada (#5–13)
- Music by: Junya Matsuoka (#1–4); Michio Igasa (#1–4); Yoshihiro Ike (#5–13)
- Studio: Chaos Project (#1–4); Radix Ace (#5–13)
- Licensed by: NA: ADV Films (2007–2009); Funimation (2009–present)
- Original network: TKV, KBS, AT-X
- English network: US: Anime Network (2007)
- Original run: Direct-to-video (#1–4); December 22, 2003 – November 26, 2004; TV broadcast (#5–13); May 2, 2005 – June 27, 2005
- Episodes: 13

Comic Party (こみっくパーティー, Komikku Pātī), sometimes abbreviated to ComiPa, is a dating sim video game by the Japanese game studio Leaf. It was first released on May 28, 1999, for Windows with adult content, but re-released with it removed for the Dreamcast, Windows, and PSP. The main focus of the game is the creation of various dōjinshi by the player's character, during which there are varied opportunities to interact with a cast of girls.

Comic Party is inspired by the real world event of Comiket (Comic Market) held in Tokyo each summer and winter. This is a convention where various artists gather together to share both parody, homage, and original work. Since the series was inspired by Comiket, it comes as no surprise that the "Comic Party" convention also takes place in the same building as Comiket, the Tokyo Big Sight convention center near Ariake, Tokyo.

Comic Party has spawned both a manga (illustrated by Sekihiko Inui) and an anime series since its inception, as well as a Dreamcast version of the original PC game which added a new character (Subaru) and removed the pornographic elements (reverse-ported to Windows, that version is called "Comic Party DCE"). Many artbooks, figures, and fan-made homages have been produced for it.

The anime series was licensed in North America by The Right Stuf International and the Sekihiko Inui's manga is licensed by Tokyopop. Comic Party Anthology Comic, a related manga originally published by Ohzora Publishing, is published by CPM under the title "Comic Party: Party Time", which is a series of doujinshi anthologies featuring stories by independent manga artists set in the Comic Party universe. Diverging frequently from Comic Party canon, this offshoot manga series includes more yaoi elements than the original materials. A sequel anime series, Comic Party Revolution, came out in 2003.

The game was ported to the PlayStation Portable (PSP) as Comic Party Portable on December 29, 2005. Promotional videos show that the Comic Party Revolution character designs are used, rather than the original designs from the Windows and Dreamcast games and the first anime series. Characters from Comic Party are featured as partner characters Aquapazza: Aquaplus Dream Match, a fighting game developed by Aquaplus with characters from various Leaf games.

== Gameplay ==
Comic Party is a point-and-click first person perspective dating sim game. It is the player's task to decide the schedule of the main protagonist, Kazuki Sendō, as he prepares for the Comic Party convention that takes place once a month. How fast Kazuki can complete his dōjinshi, how many copies he can sell at each convention, and what girl he is able to date depends on the player's choices. Only one action can be chosen on each weekday because Kazuki must attend college during the day, and two actions can be chosen on Saturday and Sunday. It is only on the weekend where the player is given the choice to leave the house and contact the girl the player wishes to pursue.

During the course of game, the protagonist will come in contact with other characters. These meetings composes mostly of text of the dialogue and actions that happen during the interactions. At certain points of the conversation, the player will be asked to choose between two or more actions that can affect the feelings of that person you are interacting with and can lead to other events.

The game begins on April 1 and ends on March 31 the next year. The ending depends on whether the player succeeds in winning a girl's heart. Although the player does not have to win a girl's heart to reach the end of the game, if the player fails at completing their monthly dōjinshi before the deadline, the game will end early.

== Synopsis ==
=== Plot ===
Early April, Kazuki Sendō is invited by his friend, Taishi Kuhonbutsu, to come with him to Tokyo Big Sight. He is surprised to see thousands of people waiting in line to get in. Apparently they are at Comic Party, a giant dōjinshi convention. Once inside, Kazuki meets some of the dōjinshi artists and is surprised to find himself enjoying their work. Taishi convinces Kazuki to draw dōjinshi after their visit because he recognizes Kazuki's skill as an artist, but Kazuki's childhood friend Mizuki tries to talk him out of it because she believes otakus are smelly, dirty, and disgusting. Her reasoning does not help because Kazuki already made up his mind and begins to draw his first dōjinshi.

== Characters ==
=== Brother 2/Two Brothers ===
Kazuki Sendō (千堂 和樹（せんどう かずき/せんどーかずき）, Sendō Kazuki)
Masami Kikuchi (Japanese), Sam Riegel (CP English), Leraldo Anzaldua (CPR English)
The protagonist of this title. Throughout high school, Kazuki Sendō coasted entirely on his natural talent for art, only to get a reality check when he failed to get into art school. Left with a lingering feeling that he could have done better if there were a more competitive environment for him to hone his artwork in, Taishi introduces him to the world of dōjinshi where he finds exactly what he was looking for. Together, they form the dōjinshi circle "Brother 2". Often spends so much time on drawing that he forgets to buy food or do his school assignments. In the anime, the character is reworked into a high school student and his backstory is trimmed down.
Taishi Kuhonbutsu (九品仏 大志（くほんぶつ たいし）, Kuhonbutsu Taishi)
Kōichi Tōchika (Japanese), Liam O'Brien (CP English), Jessie James Grelle (CPR English)
The other half of "Brother 2", he is a typical otaku who sees the dōjinshi concept as the leading pop-culture format of the 21st century. Grandiose in the expressions of his dreams, he takes charge of the logistical aspects of the partnership (paying registration fees, arranging printers, etc.), leaving the actual artwork to Kazuki.

=== Main heroines ===
Mizuki Takase (高瀬 瑞希（たかせ みずき）, Takase Mizuki)
Riko Sayama (Japanese), Rachael Lillis (CP English), Luci Christian (CPR English)
Mizuki Takase is the protagonist's friend since the first year of high school and eventually end up in the same college together. She is energetic and athletic girl with past thigh length hair in a side ponytail. She's hostile and skeptical towards otaku and dōjinshi, and is initially opposed to Kazuki's new activity. However, she's also torn by Kazuki's expressions of satisfaction with the dōjinshi process, and worries that it leaves less time for them together. As the game goes on, she slowly becomes interested in otaku culture, even trying cosplay and purchasing expensive DVD sets.
Yū Inagawa (猪名川 由宇（いながわ ゆう）, Inagawa Yū)
Kaoru Morota (Japanese), Georgette Reilly (CP English), Tiffany Grant (CPR English)
Yū Inagawa is a Kansai-speaking, passionate dōjinshi enthusiast. She is from Kobe, but comes to Tokyo often for Comic Party. Her parents own a Japanese inn and hot-springs resort that she will inherit when she is older. Yū is the sole member of the circle "Karamitei". She teaches Kazuki about dōjinshi publishing and comics exhibition. She is nicknamed "Hot springs Panda" (Panda Onseniko) by Eimi because she owns a hot springs and she has large circle glasses that is similar to the dark patches around the panda's eyes. In the anime, she's a transfer student at Kazuki's high school.
Eimi Ohba (大庭 詠美（おおば えいみ）, Ōba Eimi)
Shizuka Ishikawa (Japanese), Jessica Calvello (CP English), Larissa Wolcott (CPR English)
Eimi Ohba is an egoistic dōjin artist who self-proclaims the title of "Queen of ComiPa". She is the sole member of a popular dōjin circle called: "CAT OR FISH?!". She is fiercely competitive and believes the value of the dōjinshi is based on how many its sold. Although a savant at drawing dōjinshi, her poor academic performance leaves her on the verge of failing to graduate from high school.
Aya Hasebe (長谷部 彩（はせべ あや）, Hasebe Aya)
Mie Sonozaki (Japanese), Carol Jacobanis (CP English), Kim Prause (CPR English)
Aya Hasebe is a timid third-year high school girl who draws original dōjinshi. She usually gets Kazuki's attention by pulling on his shirt rather than calling out to him. Aya's circle is called "Jamming Book Store". Her dōjinshi does not sell well because she has a hard time attracting customers even though it has good artwork and costs only 200 yen. Kazuki admires her artwork and creative story so he tries to help her sell whenever he can.
Minami Makimura (牧村 南, Makimura Minami)
Miho Yamada (Japanese), Lisa Ortiz (CP English), Allison Sumrall (CPR English)
Minami Makimura is the head staff of the Comic Party conventions. During the conventions, she is seen patrolling the grounds. She always checks Kazuki's dōjinshi to see if it's acceptable to be sold there.
Chisa Tsukamoto (塚本 千紗（つかもと ちさ）, Tsukamoto Chisa)
Sumie Baba (Japanese), Lisa Ortiz (CP English), Kim-Ly Nguyen (CPR English)
Chisa Tsukamoto is the daughter of the printing shop where Kazuki gets his dōjinshi printed. She is hardworking and looks after the business when her parents go out of town, but she is clumsy and scatterbrained and makes mistakes with the printing process. She is often seen chasing a runaway cart. In the anime, she's a junior student at Kazuki's school.
Reiko Haga (芳賀 玲子（はが れいこ）, Haga Reiko)
Akiko Muta (Japanese), Sara Van Buskirk (CP English), Laurie Gallardo (CPR English)
A member of Team Ikkatsu, a four-girl dōjinshi circle who draw fighting game-based yaoi dōjinshi. A hardcore fan of the Fighters' Breaker series, she works part-time at the local arcade to keep an eye out for anyone playing her favorite character and fanatical obsession, Sho Kusakabe (a parody of Kyo Kusanagi from the King of Fighters). She's always enthusiastic to show her love of fighting game characters, be it through cosplay or dōjinshi. Due to a misunderstanding, mistakes Kazuki as a rare male fan of yaoi and decides to fan his interest in the hobby. Attends the same university as Kazuki and Mizuki. In the anime, her obsession with yaoi and fighting games is removed and replaced with more emphasis on cosplay, moving her part-time job to a cosplay cafe.

=== Other heroines ===
Asahi Sakurai (桜井 あさひ（さくらい あさひ）, Sakurai Asahi)
Satomi Koorogi (Japanese), Kerry Grant (CP English), Jessica Boone (CPR English)
Asahi Sakurai is anime and manga fan by day and a famous idol by night. She is the voice actress of Card Master Peach, the main character of the popular anime in the Comic Party world (and a double parody, of Wedding Peach and Cardcaptor Sakura). Even though she is an idol, she is nervous around people so she often stutters and forgets what she was going to say. Asahi disguises herself with eyeglasses and a hat when she wants to enjoy the public without a crowd around her which quickly forms when her identity is revealed. In the original PC version of the game, she's treated as a secret heroine, going by the alias "Momo-chan" until she develops a bond with Kazuki. Because of this, Asahi's role in the first Comic Party anime adaption is limited and she does not interact with the main protagonist. Instead, she is only heard on the radio and briefly seen singing at a concert. Later ports of the game openly advertise her alongside the other heroines.
Subaru Mikage (御影 すばる（みかげ すばる）, Mikage Subaru)
Masayo Kurata (Japanese), Jenny Larson (CPR English)
Miko fighter obsessed with hero stories, but terrible at creating dōjinshi. Her group is "Sin-jyusyokakutei." A new character added for the Dreamcast release of the game. She doesn't appear in the original PC version of the game or the original anime series.
Ikumi Tachikawa (立川 郁美（たちかわ いくみ）, Ichikawa Ikumi)
Kimiko Koyama (Japanese), Kerry Grant (CP English), Cynthia Martinez (CPR English)
A mysterious anonymous benefactor known only as "Tachikawa-san" who communicates with Kazuki entirely through e-mail. She first took notice of Kazuki's talent at a high school art exhibition and became his first fan, encouraging him to push his talents to new heights. Despite frequently sending Kazuki expensive gifts and having the carrier leave personal gifts on his tables at events, she chooses to keep her true identity hidden. Treated as a secret heroine in all releases up until the PSP port. In the original anime, she instead plays the role of Kazuki's first customer, meeting him in person at Comic Party events. Tachikawa is not used in the manga adaption.

=== Minor heroines ===
Miho Hoshino (星野 美穂（ほしの みほ）, Hoshino Miho), Mayu Yumeji (夢路 まゆ（ゆめじ まゆ）, Yumeji Mayu), and Yuka Tsukishiro (月城 夕香（つきしろ ゆか）, Tsukishiro Yuka)
The other three members of Reiko's dōjinshi circle. The girls are united in their love for fighting games, cosplay, and yaoi. Like Reiko, they attend the same university as Kazuki. The three of them were given a minor romance option in the Dreamcast version of the game, where they're pursued as a group.
Suzuka Kazami (風見 鈴香（かざみ すずか）, Kazami Suzuka)
A courier driver who delivers packages to Kazuki. Went unnamed in the original PC version of the game, but was given a short romance story of her in own in the Dreamcast version. Dreams of saving up enough money to buy her own motorcycle.
Makiko Sawada (澤田 真紀子（さわだ まきこ）, Sawada Makiko)
Chief editor of Comic Z Comics division. Known as the Demon of Comic Z, Sawada is known for her harsh critiquing skills. She often attends Comic Party events to scout for new talent. Was a member of a dōjinshi circle in her youth, before deciding to go into the business side of the hobby. Was given a minor romance option in the Dreamcast version of the game.

=== Other characters ===
Tsuruko Juuouji (縦王子 鶴彦（じゅうおうじ つるひこ）, Juuouji Tsuruko)/Tate Otoko (たて男, Vertical Guy)/Tate
The tall thin man in the otaku duo that frequently attends Comic Party events. His glasses are capable of detecting opponent's abilities. Always speaks in olden Japanese. Has an eye open for unknown dōjinshi artists, in hopes that their early works will someday become valuable.
Ouzouin Hetamaro (横蔵院 蔕麿（おうぞういん へたまろ）, Hetamaro Ouzouin)/Yoko Otoko (よこ男, Horizontal Guy)
The short, fat man in the otaku duo that frequently attends Comic Party events. Always stutters when he talks. Will frequently begin talking about Asahi Sakurai unprovoked. He's one of the only people capable of recognizing her in disguise. Despite his perverse nature, he can very insightful when it comes to doujinshi.
Tachikawa Yūzō (立川 雄蔵（たちかわ ゆうぞう）, Yuzo Tachikawa)
A mysterious man who often harasses Kazuki at Comic Party events. Later revealed to be Ikumi's brother. His chest has a six-star pattern resembles the Big Dipper pattern on Kenshiro Kasumi from Fist of the North Star.
Momo (モモ, Momo)/Card Master Peach (カードマスターピーチ)
The fictional main character of Card Master Peach, voiced by Asahi Sakurai. As Card Master Peach, she carries a wand resembles Sakura Kinomoto's second wand in Cardcaptor Sakura. Mizuki is able to replicate the character's costume, attacks, and transformation sequence. This character can only be seen during Asahi's route, when the player is given the option to watch episodes of the series, played out as chibi sequences.
Hemo-Hemo
Card Master Peach's pet guardian. Resembles the smaller version of Kero in Cardcaptor Sakura, but with black tiger stripes.
Yoshio
A blue penguin who acts as Comic Party's mascot character. An angrier variant called Baron Yoshio also appears on the Game Over screen.

=== Anime-exclusive characters ===
Rena Tsuchiya (槌谷 麗奈（つちや れな）, Tsuchiya Rena)
One of Mizuki's high school friends in the original Comic Party anime.
Chinami Tomono (友野 ちなみ（ともの ちなみ）, Chinami Tomono)
One of Mizuki's high school friends in the original Comic Party anime.
Mr. Chou (長（ちょう）さん)
A comic magazine editor. During Sendo and Mizuki's tour, he led them to check on the company's comic artists and making business deals. According to the DVD booklet, this character's full name is Nagase Chou, making him a member of the recurring "Nagase Clan" who appear throughout Leaf's games.
Coach
A sports instructior from Comic Party Revolution who only appears in Mizuki's flashbacks. It's ambiguous whether or not he actually exists.
Dark Mizuki (黒瑞希（くろみずき）)
A version of Mizuki Takase in Comic Party Revolution, appeared after Sendo becomes a wall circle doujin artist, but unable to draw anything for the first Comic Party convention as wall circle artist. She tried to lure Sendo to abandon comics and do oil paintings, but was defeated by Mizuki as Card Master Peach. During the succeeding convention, she went to Sendo's booth as a paying customer when the real Mizuki was absent.

== Media ==
=== Anime ===
The Comic Party anime adaptation first aired in Japan on April 1, 2001, on UHF stations. Thirteen episodes and four ten minute specials were produced by Oriental Light and Magic and KSS and directed by Norihiko Sudo. The anime focuses on the dōjinshi creation part of the game rather than the dating aspect and the specials are an original story involving the cast of Comic Party taking a vacation to a hot spring resort.

Comic Party was licensed in North America by The Right Stuf International and first announced at the Illinois anime convention, Anime Central, on April 20, 2002. It was released on four DVD volumes between March 30, 2004, and July 27, 2004. A number of rewrites and cultural changes were made to the English dub. Some examples include converting the Japanese yen to dollars in the script (although the original coins are still seen), kimono to Versace summer dress, and replacing the "Panda Onseniko" or "Hot Springs Panda" that Eimi calls Yuu with "Stupid Panda". Dōjinshi is also referred to throughout the series as "fan comics". The changes were not made to the subtitles as they are correct translations of the original Japanese script. On September 4, 2014, North American anime licensor Discotek Media announced that they have acquired the series and will re-release it on DVD in January 2015.

Comic Party Revolution is a thirteen episode sequel. The first four episodes are directed by Junichi Sakata and animated by produced by Chaos Project. The first episode was released on DVD on December 22, 2003, as the first part of a two episode OVA which was later extended to four episodes. These episodes were used as the first four episodes of the TV series that first aired on April 4, 2005, and ended on June 27, 2005. The OVAs were edited and cut in length to make the episodes fit in a normal television timeslot. Episodes five to thirteen was directed by Mitsuhiro Tōgō and produced by Radix Ace Entertainment. In Comic Party Revolution, Kazuki and Mizuki are now attending college and many of the events that take place in the game are hinted to have happened. Characters that were absent from the original series like Subaru Mikage and Asahi Sakurai make their debut. Kazuki is no longer the main focus in Revolution. Instead, the female cast roles are more equally distributed and some of them are given the spotlight in certain episodes.

Comic Party Revolution was licensed in North America by ADV Films for $30,336 which they announced at Metrocon 2006. ADV used their own voice talent for the English dub so the cast is different from the original series. Cultural changes were not made to the dub like the dub from Right Stuf.

=== Theme songs ===
==== Comic Party, Comic Party Special, Comic Party DC themes ====
Opening theme: "Kimi no Mama de" (君のままで)

- Vocals by: Emi Motoda
- Lyrics by: Naoka Suya
- Music by: Kazuhide Nakagami
- Arrangement by: Sho Mameda

Ending theme: "Katachi no Nai Machi wo Mezashite" (形のない街を目指して)

- Vocals by: Kaya
- Lyrics and music by: Hiroshi Koyama
- Arrangement by: Sho Mameda

==== Comic Party Revolution themes ====
Opening theme: "Fly"

- Vocals by: Arisa Nakayama
- Lyrics by: Naoka Suya
- Music by: Junya Matsuoka
- Arrangement by: Junya Matsuoka and Michio Kinugasa

Ending theme: "Issho ni Kurasou" (一緒に暮らそう)

- Vocals by: Emi Motoda
- Lyrics, music, and arrangement by: Susumu Mameda

=== Manga and anthologies ===
A manga adaption of Comic Party was written and illustrated by Sekihiko Inui, who is also a dōjinshi artist and continues to draw dōjinshi under the dōjin circle called Mix-ism. It made its debut in the January 2001 issue of the Japanese monthly manga magazine Dengeki Daioh and continued until the March 2005 issue. The chapters was compiled into five tankōbon volumes and published by Dengeki Comics. Comic Party manga is licensed in North America by Tokyopop. All five volumes was released between June 4, 2004, and January 31, 2006. In the first episode of the original series, Kazuki has a dream set in the world of To Heart, arguably AQUAPLUS' most famous franchise. Kazuki is cast in the role of Hiroyuki, and a number of other familiar characters appear, including Akari Kamigishi and LEAF mascot Multi.

Anthologies of short pieces by independent artists was published by various parties including Ichijinsha, Ohzora Publishing, Square Enix, Rapport, Enterbrain and Sony Magazines. One anthology series called Comic Party Anthology Comic that is published by Ohzora Publishing is licensed in North America by Central Park Media. It was renamed to Comic Party and the first volume was released on April 14, 2004. Out of the nine volumes of the series, only three was published by CPM.

== See also ==
- Dōjin Work
- To Heart
- Genshiken
- Otaku no Video
- Cosplay Complex
