= Chaos Project =

Japanese animation studio

- Native name: 有限会社カオスプロジェクト
- Romanized name: Yūgen-gaisha Kaosu Purojekuto
- Type: Yūgen gaisha
- Industry: Anime
- Founded: July 3, 1995; 31 years ago
- Headquarters: Nerima, Tokyo, Japan
- Key people: Ayumi Enomoto (representative)
- Parent: Studio Fantasia (ended 1995)

Chaos Project Co., Ltd. (Japanese: 有限会社カオスプロジェクト, Hepburn: Yūgen-gaisha Kaosu Purojekuto) is a Japanese animation studio that specializes in the production of anime. The studio's main jobs are as a sub-contracting company.

== Establishment ==
After working with Tsuchida Production, Ayumi Enomoto joined Studio Fantasia as a producer. Studio Fantasia was reformed into two divisions, and, later, the first of Fantasia's two studios became independent as Chaos Project, with Ayumi as the head.

== Works ==
The list below is a list of Chaos Project's works as a lead animation studio.

=== Anime television series ===
Anime title	Air date	Eps	Director(s)	Note(s)
Shrine of the Morning Mist	July 4, 2002 – December 26, 2002	26	Yuji Moriyama	Adaptation of a manga by Hiroki Ugawa; Co-animated with Gansis
Comic Party Revolution	April 5, 2005 – May 3, 2005	4	Junichi Sakata	Based on a game by Leaf; Episodes 5–13 produced by Radix

=== OVAs ===
Anime title	Release date	Eps	Director(s)	Note(s)
Variable Geo	November 19, 1996 – June 27, 1997	3	Tooru Yoshida	Based on a fighting game series by Giga/TGL
Jungle de Ikou!	March 26, 1997 – September 26, 1997	3	Yuji Moriyama	Original work
Geobreeders: Get Back the Kitty	May 21, 1998 – October 21, 1998	3	Yuji Moriyama	Adaptation of a manga by Akihiro Ito
Choushin Hime Dangaizer 3	September 24, 1999 – March 23, 2001	4	Masami Ōbari	Original work
Geobreeders 2: Breakthrough	July 26, 2000 – March 23, 2001	4	Shin Misawa (chief); Yuji Moriyama	Adaptation of a manga by Akihiro Ito
Usagi-chan de Cue!!	November 9. 2001 – April 26, 2002	3	Tooru Yoshida	Adaptation of a manga by Takashi Sano
Futari Ecchi	July 26, 2002 – January 22, 2004	4	Hiroshi Ishiodori; Yuji Moriyama	Adaptation of a manga by Katsu Aki
Happy Lesson	March 28, 2003	1	Ichika Doshita	Adaptation of a manga by Mutsumi Sasaki; Episodes 1–3 produced by VENET; Episode 5 produced by Studio Kuma
Comic Party Revolution	December 22, 2003 – November 11, 2004	4		Based on a game by Leaf
To Heart 2	February 28, 2007 – September 28, 2007	3	Yasuhisa Katō	Based on a game by Leaf; Co-produced with Aquaplus
Yawaraka Sangokushi Tsukisase!! Ryofuko-chan	December 26, 2007 – March 26, 2008	4	Yuji Moriyama	
To Heart 2 AD	March 26, 2008 – August 8, 2008	2	Junichi Sakata	Based on a game by Leaf; Co-produced with Aquaplus
To Heart 2 AD Plus	April 24, 2009 – October 17, 2009	2	Junichi Sakata	Based on a game by Leaf; Co-produced with Aquaplus
Utawarerumono	June 5, 2009 – June 23, 2010	3	Kenichiro Katsura	Based on a game by Leaf; Co-produced with Aquaplus
To Heart 2 AD Next	September 23, 2010 – December 22, 2010	2	Junichi Sakata	Based on a game by Leaf; Co-produced with Aquaplus
To Heart 2: Dungeon Travelers	February 22, 2012 – July 25, 2012	2	Junichi Sakata	Based on a game by Leaf
