= Lime-iro Senkitan =

Video game

- Cover art of the original PC game

らいむいろ戦奇譚 (Raimuiro Senkitan)
- Genre: Comedy; Historical; Mecha
- Video game
- Developer: ELF Corporation
- Publisher: ELF Corporation
- Genre: Visual novel
- Platform: Microsoft Windows, PlayStation 2
- Released: December 13, 2002 (Windows); March 25, 2004 (PS2)
- Anime television series
- Directed by: Iku Suzuki
- Music by: Toshiyuki Omori
- Studio: Studio Hibari
- Original network: Television Kanagawa
- Original run: January 5, 2003 – March 30, 2003
- Episodes: 13
- Original video animation

Lime-iro Senkitan: The South Island Dream Romantic Adventure
- Directed by: Iku Suzuki
- Studio: Studio Hibari
- Released: April 23, 2004 – June 25, 2004
- Episodes: 2
- Light novel

Lime-Iro Senkitan Amanohara Gakkyū Nisshi
- Written by: Satoru Akahori
- Illustrated by: Yoshiten; Mayumi Watanabe
- Imprint: Dengeki Bunko
- Published: June 10, 2004
- Video game

Lime-iro Ryūkitan X
- Developer: ELF Corporation
- Publisher: ELF Corporation
- Genre: Visual novel
- Platform: Microsoft Windows
- Released: December 13, 2004
- Anime television series

Lime-iro Ryūkitan X
- Directed by: Tsuneo Tominaga
- Music by: Kazuhiko Sawaguchi
- Studio: A.C.G.T
- Original run: January 4, 2005 – March 29, 2005
- Episodes: 13

Lime-Iro Senkitan (らいむいろ戦奇譚; lit. Lime-Colored Exotic War Story) is a game developed and published by ELF Corporation. The story was adapted to a 13-episode anime that aired in Japan between January 5 and March 30, 2003, with a two episode OVA Lime-Iro Senkitan: The South Island Dream Romantic Adventure released in 2004.

It has two sequels: Lime-Iro Ryukitan X, released in 2004 and adapted into a second season in 2005.

== Development and release history ==
The original game was released for Windows on December 13, 2002.

A PlayStation 2 version titled Lime-Iro Senkitan Jun (らいむいろ戦奇譚☆純) was announced on July 21, 2003, at the Tokyo Character Show and was published by Kadokawa Shoten on March 25, 2004.

== Story ==
The story takes place in 1904 (37th year of the Meiji Era) during the Russo-Japanese War in which former Japanese diplomat, Shintaro Umakai, becomes the teacher of a secret group of teenage girls, the Lime Unit, who are based on the flying battleship Amanohara. The girl's Konjiki (supernatural powers) enables them to operate unmanned mecha named Lime against Russian Lime units led by Grigori Rasputin who often attack the Amanohara while it is travelling towards Port Arthur for the final battle.

== Characters ==
=== Main characters ===
Shintaro Umakai (馬飼 新太郎, Umakai Shintarō)
Voiced by: Shin-ichiro Miki
A former Japanese diplomat for the Ministry of Foreign Affairs to Russia. He received his degree in teaching in Sapporo, Hokkaidō which led him to being hired as teacher for the Lime Unit. His leaving of Russia caused his former fiancée, Sophia, to join with the Russian Spiritual Corps. Early on, and after the death of Lt. Commander Date, he became the commander of the Lime Unit, even though he is a civilian.

==== Lime Unit ====
Momen Sanada (真田 木綿, Sanada Momen)
Voiced by: Ai Shimizu
A young girl who comes from a poor family, she leaves home to find work in a nearby city, where she often gets fired or scolded due to her clumsiness, because of it she always has apprehensions of being fired whenever she does something wrong. She later ends up joining the Lime Unit instead. Momen calls Shintaro brother because of his similarities shared with her brother. She is very active and incredibly strong, but she is pretty much immature and a klutz, that she should would often trip and expose her panty to Shintaro. She is ready to do anything for Shintaro, where she even wakes him up every morning. Momen controls the red Lime, Yukimura (wields a sword).
Asa Katou (加藤 麻, Katō Asa)
Voiced by: Kaoru Sasajima
A girl who grew up under her father as a military child and as such is a very commanding and tough person. She is a tomboy who practices kendo and has shared a special bond with Lt. Commander Date, whom she loved as a brother. She may be small but she is very aggressive and stubborn and often acts in a boyish manner; she also cusses a lot and is often annoyed with Sarasa's prima donna antics that she often argues with her. She controls the green Lime, Kiyomasa (wields a staff). Among the girls, she is the only one whom Shintaro never saw naked, nor was he able to accidentally see her in her underwear. It is suggested that she is the youngest among the girls in the unit.
Sarasa Honda (本多 更紗, Honda Sarasa)
Voiced by: Tsubasa Otomiya
Sarasa is a primadonna who has a fascination with Western culture, which causes her to buy, wear, and use what she mostly think are "western" products, but which are actually made mostly in Osaka, the attire she wore, that she thought is western is actually an Ao Dai. She acts overconfident and brash, and often hides various things about herself which may make her appear weaker to other people, such as claiming people in the West make dolls instead of origami cranes as gifts because she can't make them herself. She also has a dog named Antionette Gandhi XIII, or Angie for short. she also falls in love with her teacher. Sarasa controls the blue Lime, Taiga (wields a pole-arm/lance). It is suggested that she is the oldest among the girls in the unit, she also performs poorly in class.
Kinu Fukushima (福島 絹, Fukushima Kinu)
Voiced by: Sayaka Aoki
The best friend with Asa but has a low self-confidence which causes her to cry when Asa becomes forcefully verbal with her. She has special connections to the spiritual world which had enabled her to talk with spirits until Shintaro broke the bond. She also makes use of voodoo dolls quite frequently. Kinu controls the yellow/orange Lime, Masanori (wields a gun). Among the girls, she is the only one who has had sex with Shitaro where he reluctantly did it to break her bond from the spirits that has cause her konjiki to go out of control and thus saving her life.
Rinzu Kuroda (黒田 綸子, Kuroda Rinzu)
Voiced by: Yuka Aimoto
A very quiet girl, most likely from her tragic experiences early on in which her father kept her locked up like a bird in a cage after the rest of her family died. As a loner, she has develop a certain relationship with herself through her mirror, by performing certain acts of self gratification by her lonesome. Shintaro helped Rinzu break free of her sorrow by revealing that her father had died trying to save her, instead of actually committing suicide. Rinzu controls the purple Lime, Nagamasa (wields a bow, and is displayed as a centaur). Among the girls in her unit she is the only one who willing offered herself to Shintaro, but it was uncertain if the latter has accepted her offer.

=== Minor characters ===
==== Amanohara crew ====
Hyogo Kaji (梶 兵庫, Kaji Hyōgo)
Voiced by: Koji Ishii
The commanding officer aboard the Amanohara.
Sumi Ichijōji (一乗寺 須美, Ichijōji Sumi)
Voiced by: Asako Dodo
The head doctor aboard the Amanohara. She often tries to seduce Shintaro, especially against the Lime Unit girls. It was suggested that she is the first female on board the Amanohara whom Shitarou had sex with.
Kuki (九鬼, Kuki)
Voiced by: Satomi Koorogi
A benevolent, human form demon who gives the Amanohara the ability to fly. She is accompanied by human form Shikigami triplets who are cast as little girls. She occasionally requires sex from Shitarou in order to charge her spiritual powers, though at times she can also do it by relaxing at an Onsen.
Lieutenant Commander Masanosuke Date (伊達 将之輔, Date Masanosuke)
Voiced by: Nobuyuki Hiyama
The previous commander of the Lime Unit until he sacrificed himself to defend Sarasa from an enemy Lime. He had a special brother-sister style bond with Asa and they often practiced kendo with each other.

==== Russian Spiritual Corps ====
Grigori Yefimovich Rasputin (グレゴリー・エフィモヴィッチ・ラスプーチン, Guregorī Efimovicchi Rasupūchin)
Voiced by: Susumu Chiba
The leader of the Russian Spiritual Corps. He later found and recruited Sophia, Rasha, and Saten into the organization. It is believed he survived a large boulder that fell on him in the final episode, which would allow for his real death in 1916. He controlled the large black Lime, Pyotr.
Sophia (ソフィア, Sofia)
Voiced by: Kumiko Yokote
The former fiancée of Shintaro. After he left her to return to Japan, she was found by Rasputin who realized her ability to manipulate her Konjiki. She was sent to the Amanohara to disrupt their activities and eventually cause Shintaro to kill the Lime Unit girls. She failed her mission however, and was greatly injured when she was crushed by a large boulder in the final episode. In order to protect Shintaro, she uses the last of her strength to send her Lime to intercept a blast from Rasputin's Pyotr. Her last wish, before dying, was that Shintaro live on without her. She controls a light blue Lime and goes by the codename Veludo.
Rasha (ラシャ)
Voiced by: Kaoru Morota
Her parents were believed to be rebellious Russians around the beginning of the 20th century. Her parents were thus killed by Russian soldiers or police. She was however saved by Rasputin from certain rape and death by the hands of her parents murderers. She controls a light purple Lime as well as several minor Lime.
Saten (サテン)
Voiced by: Mika Kanai
The only survivor of a famine and was saved by Rasputin while she lay in the street starving and barely alive. She controls a dark red Lime as well as several minor Lime.

== Episodes ==
1. The Girl's Academy on the Battleship
2. Amanohara, Weigh Anchor!
3. As a Soldier, and as a Teacher
4. Detective Sarasa?!
5. The Other Homeland
6. The Peaceful Day Off
7. A Thousand Paper Cranes
8. I'm not Afraid of Bad Luck
9. Little Step
10. The Closed Heart
11. Onii-chan's Day
12. The Last Class
13. Victory Bell, Echo Towards the Future

== Music ==
Opening Themes
#	Transcription/Translation	Performed by	Episodes
	Cold Flowers (凛花; Rinka)	Raimu-tai	All

Ending themes
#	Transcription/Translation	Performed by	Episodes
	Beyond the Sky (空のむこう; Sora no Mukō)	at Gallery	All
