= Kaoru Morota =

Japanese voice actress

- Born: September 26, 1971 (age 54); Osaka, Japan
- Occupation: Voice actress
- Years active: 1995-present
- Agent: Haikyō

Kaoru Morota (茂呂田 かおる, Morota Kaoru; born September 26, 1971) is a Japanese voice actress from Osaka, Japan. She is often typecast as genki girls or tomboyish characters due to her Kansai dialect. Using the alias "AYA", Kaoru has also done voice acting for Anime Eroge titles but also provided theme song vocals for both Evangelion and Le Chevalier D'Eon.

== Voice roles ==
=== TV animation ===
- Ike! Inachû takkyû-bu – Female Student, Female Staff (1995)
- You're Under Arrest THE MOVIE – Ayane Hayashi (1999)
- Gensomaden Saiyuki – Lirin, Hakuryu, Additional Voices (2000)
- Inuyasha – Vixen (2000)
- Samurai Girl: Real Bout High School – Nanase Kuon (2001)
- Comic Party – Yuu Inagawa (2001)
- Usagi-chan de Cue!! – Mikami Inaba/Mimika (2001–2002)
- Shrine of the Morning Mist – Seiko Rikiishi (2002)
- Tokyo Underground – Chelsea Rorec (2002)
- Jungle wa itsumo Hale nochi Guu Deluxe – Weda (2002)
- Jungle wa Itsumo Hale Nochi Guu Final – Weda (2003)
- Kaleido Star – Lady (2003)
- True Love Story: Summer Days, and yet... – Ruri Morisaki (2003)
- Raimuiro Senkitan – Rasha (2003)
- Tantei Gakuen Q – Kaori-san (2003–2004)
- Raimuiro Senkitan: The South Island Dream Romantic Adventure – Rasha (2004)
- Medaka no Gakkō – Medaka Kōno (2004–2005)
- Comic Party: Revolution – Yuu Inagawa (2005)
- Magical Canan – Shiba Koube (2005)
- Kishin Houkou Demonbane – Chiaki (2006)
- Bleach – Mizuho Asano (2007)
- Koihime Musō – Choryo (2008)
- Shin Koihime Musō – Choryo (2010)
- Saki Achiga-hen episode of side-A – Toshi Kumakura (2012)
- Toriko – Tsurara Mama (2012)
- Monogatari Series Second Season – Mrs. Hachikuji (2013)
- Saki: The Nationals – Toshi Kumakura, Kumiko Hanibuchi (2014)

=== Games ===
- Super Monkey Ball – Monkey Voice #1 (2001)
- Super Monkey Ball 2 – Monkey Voice #1 (2002)
- Sonic Riders – AiAi (2006)
- Sega Superstars Tennis – AiAi (2008)
- Sonic & Sega All-Stars Racing – AiAi (2010)

=== Dubbing ===
- Inferno – Carol Delvecchio
- Picking Up the Pieces – Carlita
- Everybody Loves Sunshine – Nelson
- The Golden Bowl – Maggie Verver
- The Sweetest Thing – Judy Webb
- But I'm a Cheerleader – Graham
- Purely Belter – Gemma
- Jackie Brown – Sheronda
- Remember the Titans – Emma Hoyt
- Love in Paris – Claire
- The Legend of Bagger Vance – Mary Jones
- He Got Game – Lala Bonilla (Rosario Dawson)
