= Michio Kinugasa =

Japanese composer (died 2020)

- 衣笠 道雄
- Died: 29 July 2020
- Occupation: Composer
- Notable work: Utawarerumono (2002); Living for the Day After Tomorrow (2006)
- Style: Anime song

Michio Kinugasa (衣笠 道雄, Kinugasa Michio; died 29 July 2020) was a Japanese composer. He composed the opening theme songs for Utawarerumono and Living for the Day After Tomorrow, which were both sung by Suara.
