= Mizuho Aimoto =

Female Japanese manga artist

- Born: November 29; Higashinari-ku, Osaka Prefecture
- Occupation: Manga artist
- Website: Official website

Mizuho Aimoto (愛本 みずほ, Aimoto Mizuho; born November 29 in Higashinari-ku, Osaka Prefecture, Japan) is a Japanese manga artist.

== Works ==
- ABO no Tenshi-tachi (ABOの天使たち)
- Kare to Kanojo no yesterday (彼と彼女のイエスタデイ)
- Konna ni Kimi o I LOVE YOU (こ〜んなにきみをI LOVE YOU!)
- Ashita kitto anata ni (あしたきっとあなたに)
- Tenshi ni naritai (天使になりたい)
- Kiss Kiss Kiss (Kiss♪kiss♪kiss)
- Dousoukai (同窓会 -Re union-)
- Half boiled angel (ハーフ・ボイルド・エンジェル)
- Hanagonomi byouin no hitobito (花ごよみ病院の人々)
- Kanashii kibun DE shitsuren club (哀しい気分DE失恋倶楽部)
- Tenshi ni naritai Hina no nurse nisshi (天使になりたい -ひなのナース日誌-)
- Yukiko (由希子 -輝くいのち-)
- Daisuki!! Yuzu no Kosodate Nikki (だいすき!! ゆずの子育て日記)
- Itoshii Uso: Yasashii Yami (愛しい嘘 優しい闇)
- My Wonderful World
