= Yuka Aimoto =

Japanese stage and voice actress

- 相本 結香
- Born: Tokyo, Japan
- Occupations: stage and voice actress

Yuka Aimoto (相本 結香, Aimoto Yuka; born in Tokyo, Japan) is a Japanese stage and voice actress.

== Filmography ==
- Mouse (2003 TV series) – Female Newscaster (ep 9), Yumi (ep 8)
- Raimuiro Senkitan (2003 TV series) – Rinzu Kuroda, Theme Song Performance
- Raimuiro Senkitan: The South Island Dream Romantic Adventure (2004 OVA series) – Rinzu Kuroda, Theme Song Performance
- Canvas 2: Niji Iro no Sketch (2005 TV series) – Art club member (ep 10, 14, 20)

== Singles ==
- "Cold Flowers" (凛花, "Rinka") released on December 25, 2002, and ranked 131st in Oricon singles charts.
- "Rinzu Kuroda" (黒田倫子) image song single of the eponymous character released on July 23, 2003.
