= Aimoto Station =

Aimoto Station is the name of two train stations in Japan:

- Aimoto Station (Hyōgo) (藍本駅) in Sanda, Hyōgo Prefecture on the West Japan Railway Fukuchiyama Line
- Aimoto Station (Toyama) (愛本駅) in Unazuki, Toyama Prefecture on the Toyama Chihō Railway
