= Ratman (manga) =

Japanese manga series

- Cover of the first volume

ラットマン (Rattoman)
- Genre: Adventure, comedy, superhero
- Manga
- Written by: Sekihiko Inui
- Published by: Kadokawa Shoten
- English publisher: NA: Viz Media
- Magazine: Monthly Shōnen Ace
- Original run: August 2007 – June 26, 2013
- Volumes: 12

Ratman (ラットマン, Rattoman) is a Japanese shōnen manga written and illustrated by Sekihiko Inui. The series follows the story of Shuto Katsuragi, a wannabe hero, who tries to save his friend, but ends up becoming the "villain" Ratman.

Ratman was serialized in the Japanese magazine Shōnen Ace, published by Kadokawa Shoten from August 2007 to June 2013. Kadokawa Shoten compiled its chapters into twelve tankōbon bound volumes.

Ratman was published in America by Tokyopop, but production ceased after volume 4. It is currently licensed by Viz Media.

== Plot ==
Taking place in the day and age of heroes, technological advancements in recent years has allowed corporations to design all sorts of heroes, igniting widespread public interest. The corporate appeal of these mascots led to the arrival of these so-called "commercial heroes" who're subsequently registered under the "Hero Association", an organization that assigns missions to said heroes.

Shuto Katsuragi, a kind-hearted 15-year-old who, despite his less than imposing stature, has dreamed of becoming a hero himself since childhood. One day at school, he talks with a classmate, Mirea Mizushima, about his desire to overcome the odds and be a hero. Shortly after, Shuto is kidnapped by the evil organization known as "Jackal" in which Mirea works at, and he is tricked into wearing a watch that changes him into the superhuman, "Ratman". Despite Jackal forcing him to work for them in their mission to overthrow the Hero Association, Shuto strives to turn Ratman into a hero.

== Main characters ==
Shuto Katsuragi (葛城 修斗, Katsuragi Shūto) / Ratman (ラットマン, Rattoman)

A short and energetic high schooler who aspires to one day join the Hero Association but is often teased by his friends for being too short to join. After meeting Mirea and telling her how he doesn't want to give up on his dream, he is kidnapped by the evil organization Jackal and works for them as the anti-hero Ratman with the promise that he could one day graduate to being a full-fledged hero.

Mirea Mizushima (水島 ミレア, Mizushima Mirea)

Shuto's tall, foreign classmate who often exudes a cold and quiet exterior, making it difficult for her classmates to approach her about her cute mascot hobbies. She develops a crush on Shuto after meeting him and is the one who recommends Shuto as the candidate for the Ratman identity. She works at the evil organization Jackal with her sister Crea as the leader in its goal to overthrow the Hero Association for their hidden sins against their family.

== Jackal Society ==
Crea Mizushima (水島 クレア, Mizushima Kurea)

The elder sister of Mirea and the leader of Jackal. She learns about Shuto from Mirea and orders the Jacky Combatants to kidnap and turn him into their superpowered pawn, Ratman. Her goal is to overthrow the Hero Association and make them pay for the crime they committed against her parents.

Jacky Combatants (戦闘員ジャッキー, Sentōin Jakkī)

The generic minions of Jackal, the speechless Jackies often act weak as fodder and comedic effect, making them essentially useless in Jackal's combat activities.

Gengo Mizushima (Mizushima Gengo)

The grandfather of Mirea and Crea and the second in-command in Jackal. He and Crea created the Ratman suit that Shuto wears.

== Hero's Association ==
Shouichirou Kizaki (姫崎 翔一郎, Kizaki Shoōichirō)

The president of the Hero's Association, he is the one in charge of assigning registered heroes their missions and regulating conflicts within the organization. He once worked with the Mizushimas' parents prior to the prominence of the Association.

Rio Kizaki (姫崎 梨緖, Kizaki Rio)

The daughter of the Hero Association's president and a registered high school hero. She is an upperclassman at Shuto's school and despite being friends at school from being hero admirers, they clash several times as their opposing hero-villain selves.

Saeki (佐伯) / Ankaiser
Taishi Hosokawa (細川 大志, Hosokawa Taishi) / Fatman (ファットマン, Fattoman)

=== S Security ===
Hijiri Midou (御堂聖, Midō Hijiri) / Kreios
Shiki Kazamori / Unchain

== Media ==
=== Manga ===
The manga series Ratman is written and illustrated by Sekihiko Inui. Ratman was serialized in the Japanese magazine Shōnen Ace, and has been published by Kadokawa Shoten from August 2007 to June 2013. Kadokawa Shoten compiled its chapters into twelve bound volumes.
