= Suzumi-bune =

- すヾみ舟
- Directed by: Hakuzan Kimura (Note: The attribution of Suzumi-bune to Hakuzan Kimura is not certain. For legally distributed films, basic information such as year of production and related personnel would typically be recorded in sources such as Kensatsu Geppō (Censorship Monthly Report), but for illegally circulated blue films (pornographic films), such documentation often does not survive. The idea that Kimura was the creator began to be discussed only from 1952 onward, and no contemporaneous primary sources supporting this claim have been confirmed as of now.)
- Release date: 1932 (Note: The film is often dated to around 1932, but the exact year of production is unclear. Depending on the literature and researchers' views, proposed dates include 1929, 1930, and 1937.)
- Running time: 10 minutes
- Country: Japan
- Language: Silent

Suzumi-bune (Japanese: すヾみ舟, lit. "Feeling Cool in a Boat") is a Japanese adult animated silent short film independently produced in 1932. It is known as "Japan's first hentai anime".

The film is black-and-white and circulated under several alternative titles, including Sumida-gawa (隅田川, Sumida River), Kanda-gawa (神田川, Kanda River), Kawabiraki (川開き, Festival marking the start of boating season), Hanabi (花火, Fireworks), Yūsuzumi (夕涼み, Cool off in the evening), and Manga (マンガ).

The original 35 mm film element is held by the National Film Archive of Japan (NFAJ). In Japan, the copyright protection period is described as having expired and the work is considered public domain domestically. (Note: Under Article 54, paragraph 1 of the former Copyright law of Japan, works created and published by an individual under anonymity or a pseudonym on or before 31 December 1967 were protected for a term of 50 years from the date of publication. If such works were not published within 50 years of their creation, the term of protection expired 50 years after the date of creation.)

== Plot ==
Set in the Edo period, the film depicts the sexual escapades of two women who appear at a river-opening festival on the Kanda River. A woman who resembles the daughter of a wealthy merchant is tempted by a handsome man and begins a sexual encounter, but is spotted by a boatman at the last moment and falls into the river. The woman's attendant—portrayed like a wet nurse—is beckoned by the boatman and then voyeuristically watches the resumed encounter.

== Background and commentary ==
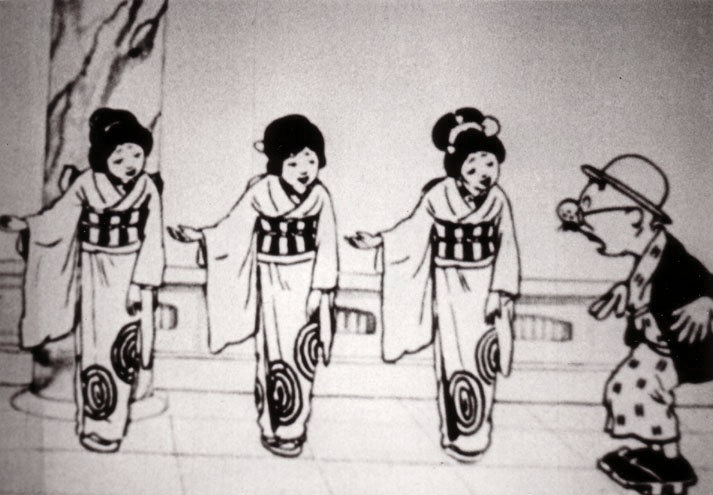
Hakuzan Kimura's Nonkina Tōsan: Ryūgū Mairi (not a hentai anime)

The alleged creator, Hakuzan Kimura (木村白山, Kimura Hakuzan; dates unknown), is known as an artist active in the early period of Japanese animation history. He worked on an animated adaptation of Yutaka Asō's four-panel comic Nonkina Tōsan, produced educational films under the direction of the Ministry of Education, and directed short animated films at Asahi Kinema, including Kin-ken Chochiku: Shiobara Tasuke (1925), (Note: A 10-minute version survives at the National Film Archive of Japan.) Jitsuroku Chūshingura (1925), and Matsu-chan no Gōyū (1926).

According to accounts summarized in later literature, Kimura produced Suzumi-bune over three years at his home in Koishikawa Kasugachō. The film's style is said to have evoked a Japanese sensibility with an ukiyo-e-like touch, while also incorporating realistic draftsmanship influenced by modern Western-style painting. It was reportedly planned as a two-reel work, but shortly after completion of the first reel it was raided as an illegal obscene film, confiscated by the Koishikawa Police Station (now Tomisaka Police Station), and Kimura was arrested; a second reel was never made.

In addition to the confiscated 35 mm original, a 16 mm print is said to have been duplicated by an unknown party and circulated clandestinely as a blue film (pornographic film), particularly during the prewar period. The painter Yaku Mouri contributed a review of the film to the sex-science magazine Ningen Tankyu (人間探求, Human Quest) in its July 1952 issue, stating that he had watched the film before 1937 via a very poor-quality 16 mm print. According to a hearsay account relayed by Gorō Sugimoto, it was screened for the postwar occupation forces, and later the 16 mm print was sold overseas as "Utamaro Anime."

Blue-film researcher Takuya Hasegawa evaluated the film in strongly positive terms, describing its concept as an ukiyo-e-inspired design with subtle humor, estimating that it likely required more than 15,000 drawings despite running only about 10 minutes, and emphasizing the extraordinary labor involved in producing it alone without modern equipment. He also wrote that collectors might be willing to pay as much as one million yen, and suggested that the only other blue film comparable in that sense would be the postwar blue-film version of Kaze tachinu (Note: This refers to a blue-film version of Kaze tachinu released in 1954 by a group active in Kōchi Prefecture known as the "Ebihara Group" (also called the "Tosa no Kurosawa"). It was said to have delighted literary figures including Akiyuki Nosaka and has been described as a masterpiece within blue-film culture.).

As a result of these circumstances, Suzumi-bune has been treated as a legendary "phantom" domestically produced pornographic classic that is effectively impossible to view. According to Soji Ushio, around 1939 when he joined Toho, senior colleagues repeatedly praised the film's excellence, yet he was never actually shown it. A separate "legend" claims that Walt Disney praised the film after the war upon seeing evidence held by the Tokyo police; this is generally considered unreliable, including because Disney is not known to have ever visited Japan.

Overall, much of the discourse surrounding the film is based on hearsay and conjecture, and discussing the work in detail through literature alone has been criticized as bordering on idle speculation.

The manga Obiya Kagyō (オビ屋稼業, Obiya business; story by Shirō Tō; art by Tsuguo Kōgo; Shōbunkan; 1991), which depicts the blue-film business, includes a scene in which the protagonist shows Suzumi-bune to an elderly painter to persuade him to draw erotic animation.

== Survival and preservation ==
=== Rediscovery ===
After the work was cracked down on by the police in 1932, the film's whereabouts remained unknown for about 70 years. As a result, it was long spoken of in legendary terms as a "lost film". However, in the early 21st century, what is believed to be a confiscated 35 mm film of the work was donated to the Film Center of the National Museum of Modern Art, Tokyo (now the National Film Archive of Japan: NFAJ), and its survival was confirmed, though only among a very limited number of concerned parties. The NFAJ is said to hold two film cans (a complete version of 219.1 m and an incomplete version of 211.2 m), but no further information has been made public, and the details remain unknown.

Regarding the circumstances of its rediscovery, anime researcher Jonathan Clements wrote that it was unearthed from a police archive donated to the Film Center. This appears to have been an accidental discovery made during the bulk disposal of nitrate film that had long been confiscated and stored by the Tokyo Metropolitan Police Department. Later, when information on the work was entered into the Agency for Cultural Affairs' Media Arts Database (development version), released in March 2015, its survival became widely known to the public for the first time. However, no announcement concerning the "rediscovery" of the work has been made by the NFAJ to this day. It also remains unclear whether nonflammabilization, duplication, or digitization for the purpose of long-term preservation has been carried out.

=== Access restrictions ===
Despite rediscovery, the film remains unavailable to the public, a situation described as culturally unfortunate.

In September 2018, the Toy Film Museum in Kyoto Prefecture held a research symposium on Kimura titled "Who is Kimura Hakuzan?" and requested to borrow the film from the Film Center for screening. The museum stated that it was told the film could not be shown due to an agreement with the donor ("cannot be made public under the donor arrangement"). Museum staff reportedly asked the Center to approach the donor to allow access at least for researchers, expressing concern that the film would otherwise remain effectively unused in storage.

== See also ==
- Hakuzan Kimura
- History of animation
- Pornographic film (see also "Blue film" in Japanese context)
- Maruhi Gekiga, Ukiyo-e Senichiya – Known as Japan's first adult-rated (R18+) animation.
