= Hentai =

Anime and manga pornography

Hentai (ヘンタイ, deviation/abnormality; 変態) is a style of Japanese pornographic anime and manga. In addition to anime and manga, hentai works exist in a variety of media, including artwork and video games (commonly known as eroge).

The development of hentai has been influenced by Japanese cultural and historical attitudes toward sexuality. Hentai works, which are often self-published, form a significant portion of the market for doujin works, including doujinshi. Numerous subgenres exist depicting a variety of sexual acts and relationships, as well as novel fetishes.

== Terminology ==
In sexual contexts, hentai carries additional meanings of "perversion" or "abnormality", especially when used as an adjective; in these uses, it is the shortened form of the phrase hentai seiyoku (変態性欲) which means "sexual perversion". The character hen is a catch-all for queerness as a peculiarity—it does not carry an explicit sexual reference. While the term has expanded in use to cover a range of publications including homosexual publications, it remains primarily a heterosexual term, as terms indicating homosexuality entered Japan as foreign words. Japanese pornographic works are often simply tagged as 18-kin (18禁; '18-prohibited'), meaning "prohibited to those not yet 18 years old", and seijin manga (成人漫画; "adult manga"). Less official terms also in use include ero anime (エロアニメ), ero manga (エロ漫画), and the English initialism AV (for "adult video"). Usage of the term hentai does not define a genre in Japan.

The word hentai written in kanji

Hentai is defined differently in English. The Oxford Dictionary Online defines it as "a subgenre of the Japanese genres of manga and anime, characterized by overtly sexualized characters and sexually explicit images and plots." The origin of the word in English is unknown, but AnimeNation's John Oppliger points to the early 1990s, when a Dirty Pair erotic doujinshi (self-published work) titled H-Bomb was released, and when many websites sold access to images culled from Japanese erotic visual novels and games. The earliest English use of the term traces back to the rec.arts.anime boards, with a 1990 post concerning Happosai of Ranma ½ and the first discussion of the meaning in 1991. A 1995 glossary on the rec.arts.anime boards contained reference to the Japanese usage and the evolving definition of hentai as "pervert" or "perverted sex". The Anime Movie Guide, published in 1997, defines "ecchi" (エッチ, etchi) as the initial sound of hentai (i.e., the name of the letter H, as pronounced in Japanese); it included that ecchi was "milder than hentai". A year later it was defined as a genre in Good Vibrations Guide to Sex. At the beginning of 2000, "hentai" was listed as the 41st most-popular search term of the internet, while "anime" ranked 99th. The attribution has been applied retroactively to works such as Urotsukidōji, La Blue Girl, and Cool Devices. Urotsukidōji had previously been described with terms such as "Japornimation", and "erotic grotesque", prior to being identified as hentai.

	Development of the term "Hentai"
Meiji period (1868–1912)	Hysteria
1917s	Abnormal sexual desire.
1920s–1930s	Perverted sexuality. Topics related to homosexual relationships.
1940s–1950s	Hentai seiyoku or "perverted desires". Homosexual relationships are still a major theme.
1960s	The term becomes increasingly heterosexualised. The word "ecchi/etchi" appears for the first time.
1970s and afterwards	Development into a loanword in English with its own meaning, referring to a specific pornographic genre.
2000s	In Japan, refers to male heterosexual perversion rather than a wide range of sexual practices and identities. Also refers to the cartoon genre.

== Etymology ==
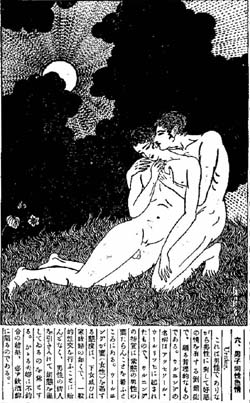
A depiction of a male homosexual couple from the January 1928 edition of Hentai shiryō

変態 (hentai; shinjitai;) derives from 變態 (classical Chinese, also kyūjitai), which is attested in classical Chinese texts. It functioned as a verbal phrase, from its two component morphemes, 變 meaning "to change" and 態 meaning "state" or "condition," hence "to change from one state to another." Literal one-to-one English translations for this would be transform and metamorph, wherein trans- and meta- correspond to 變, while form and morph to 態. This meaning is attested in early Middle Japanese and later texts.

In Chinese, 變 is primarily a verb meaning to "change," and secondarily a noun meaning "troublesome event," but in Japanese, it was extended to an adjectival noun meaning "different," "unusual" or "strange" (compare other compounds such as hentai (變體; lit. 'variant form') as in hentaigana (變體假名), and henkaku (變格; lit. 'irregular style') as in henkaku katsuyō (變格活用)). This led 變態 to become a noun phrase meaning "strange state," thus "abnormality," instead of the original "to change to another state," in modern Japanese and Chinese publications, particularly in psychology and physiology. A psychological application of this meaning is found in the phrase 変態性欲 (hentai seiyoku lit. 'abnormal sexual desire'), which has been cited as being shortened (by ellipsis) back to just 変態.

Yet another meaning, metamorphosis, which resembles the original one, was first adopted by the Entomological Society of Japan and reintroduced into Chinese, Korean and Vietnamese. This meaning is used in the English translation of the light novel Perfect Blue: Complete Metamorphosis, although it is not directly entomological, and it may also reference the semi-sexual portions of the work.

It is worth noting that 変態 is further shortened to H (etchi), the first letter of its romanization. Both hentai and etchi (or ecchi in English parlance) are used to refer to sexual perversion/deviance, or people therewith, as well as smut. A person accused of sexual perversion may be derogatorily called hentai, while a sex scene in a film, TV show or erotic game is called Hシーン (etchi shīn lit. 'H-scene'). The distinction outside of Japanese contexts between "hardcore" hentai and "softcore" etchi is entirely artificial.

The history of the word hentai has its origins in science and psychology. By the middle of the Meiji era, the term appeared in publications to describe unusual or abnormal traits, including paranormal abilities and psychological disorders. A translation of German sexologist Richard von Krafft-Ebing's text Psychopathia Sexualis originated the concept of hentai seiyoku, as a "perverse or abnormal sexual desire", though it was popularized outside psychology, as in the case of Mori Ōgai's 1909 novel Vita Sexualis. Continued interest in hentai seiyoku resulted in numerous journals and publications on sexual advice which circulated in the public, served to establish the sexual connotation of hentai as perverse. Any perverse or abnormal act could be hentai, such as committing shinjū (love suicide). It was Nakamura Kokyo's journal Abnormal Psychology which started the popular sexology boom in Japan which would see the rise of other popular journals like Sexuality and Human Nature, Sex Research and Sex. Originally, Tanaka Kogai wrote articles for Abnormal Psychology, but it would be Tanaka's own journal Modern Sexuality which would become one of the most popular sources of information about erotic and neurotic expression. Modern Sexuality was created to promote fetishism, S&M, and necrophilia as a facet of modern life. The ero guro movement and depiction of perverse, abnormal and often erotic undertones were a response to interest in hentai seiyoku.

Following World War II, Japan took a new interest in sexualization and public sexuality. Mark McLelland puts forth the observation that the term hentai found itself shortened to "H" and that the English pronunciation was "etchi", referring to lewdness and which did not carry the stronger connotation of abnormality or perversion. By the 1950s, the "hentai seiyoku" publications became their own genre and included fetish and homosexual topics. By the 1960s, the homosexual content was dropped in favor of subjects like sadomasochism and stories of lesbianism targeted to male readers. The late 1960s brought a sexual revolution which expanded and solidified the normalizing of the term's identity in Japan that continues to exist today through publications such as Bessatsu Takarajima's Hentai-san ga iku series.

== History ==
With the usage of hentai as any erotic depiction, the history of these depictions is split into their media. Japanese artwork and comics serve as the first example of hentai material, coming to represent the iconic style after the publication of Azuma Hideo's Cybele in 1979. Hentai first appeared in animation in the 1932 film Suzumi-bune by Hakusan Kimura, which was seized by police when it was half complete. The remnants of the film were donated to the National Film Center in the early 21st century. The film has never been viewed by the public. However, the 1984 release of Wonderkid's Lolita Anime was the first hentai to get a general release, overlooking the erotic and sexual depictions in 1969's A Thousand and One Nights and the bare-breasted Cleopatra in 1970's Cleopatra film. Erotic games, another area of contention, has its first case of the art style depicting sexual acts in 1985's Tenshitachi no Gogo. In each of these mediums, the broad definition and usage of the term complicates its historic examination.

=== Origin of erotic manga ===
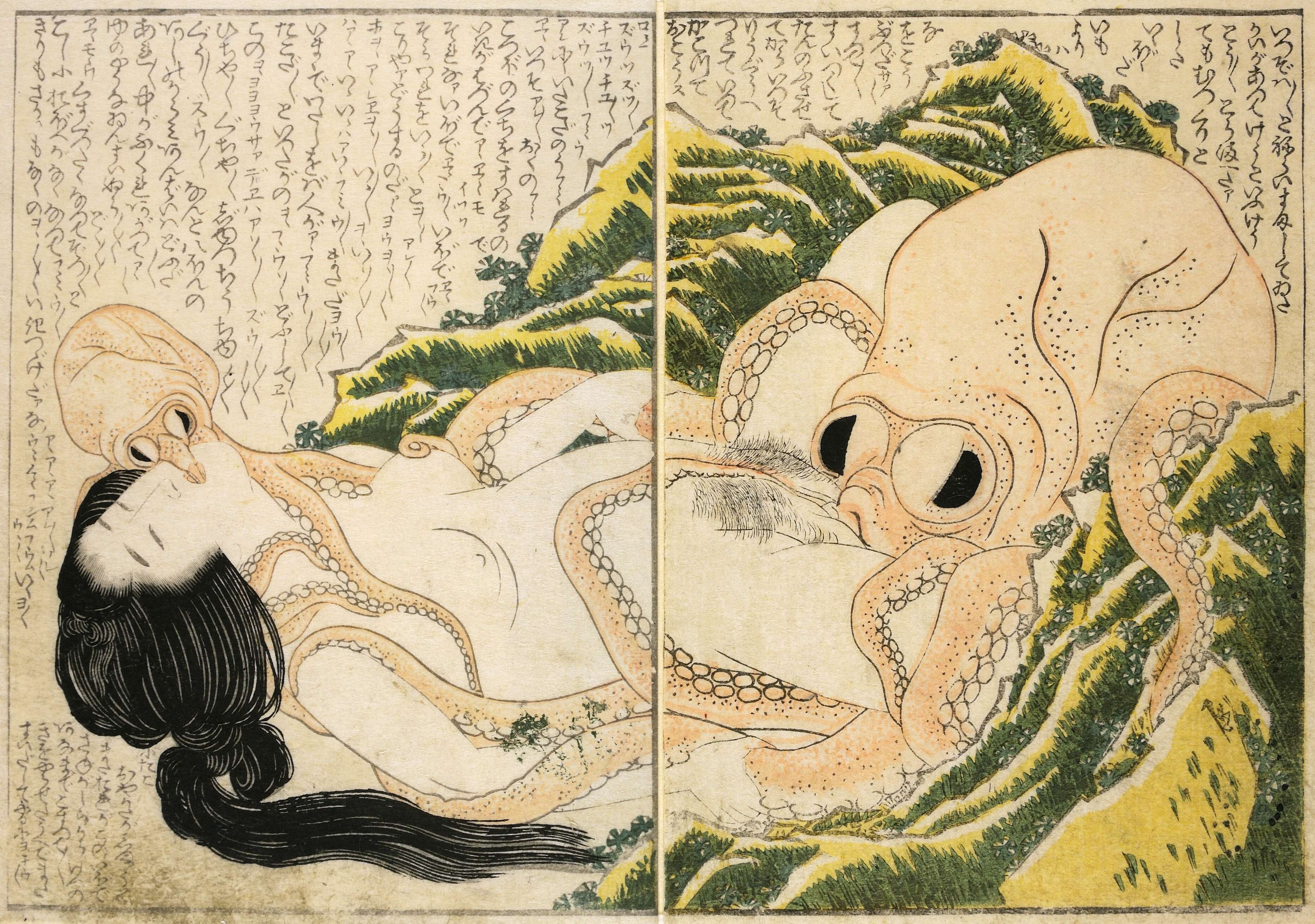
The Dream of the Fisherman's Wife (1814), a well-known example of Japanese erotic art (shunga)

Depictions of sex and abnormal sex can be traced back through the ages, predating the term "hentai". Shunga, a Japanese term for erotic art, is thought to have existed in some form since the Heian period. From the 16th to the 19th centuries, shunga works were suppressed by the shogunate. A well-known example is The Dream of the Fisherman's Wife by Hokusai, which depicts a woman being stimulated by two octopuses. Shunga production fell with the introduction of pornographic photographs in the late 19th century.

To define erotic manga, a definition for manga is needed. While the Hokusai Manga uses the term "manga" in its title, it does not depict the storytelling aspect common to modern manga, as the images are unrelated. Due to the influence of pornographic photographs in the 19th and 20th centuries, the manga artwork was depicted by realistic characters. Osamu Tezuka helped define the modern look and form of manga, and was later proclaimed as the "God of Manga". His debut work New Treasure Island was released in 1947 as a comic book through Ikuei Publishing and sold over 400,000 copies, though it was the popularity of Tezuka's Astro Boy, Metropolis, and Jungle Emperor manga that came to define the media. This story-driven manga style is distinctly unique from comic strips like Sazae-san, and story-driven works came to dominate shōjo and shōnen magazines.

Adult themes in manga have existed since the 1940s, but some of these depictions were more realistic than the cartoon-cute characters popularized by Tezuka. In 1973, Manga Bestseller (later known as Manga Erotopia), which is considered to be the first hentai manga magazine published in Japan, was responsible for creating a new genre known as ero-gekiga, where gekiga was taken, and the sexual and violent content was intensified. Other well-known "ero-gekiga" magazines were Erogenica (1975), and Alice (1977). The circulation of ero-gekiga magazines peaked in 1978, and it is believed that somewhere between eighty and one hundred different ero-gekiga magazines were being published annually.

The 1980s saw the decline of ero-gekiga in favor of the rising popularity of lolicon and bishōjo magazines, which grew from otaku fan culture. It has been theorized that the decline of ero-gekiga was due to the baby boomer readership beginning to start their own families, as well as migrating to seinen magazines such as Weekly Young Magazine, and when it came to sexual material, the readership was stolen by gravure and pornographic magazines. The distinct shift in the style of Japanese pornographic comics from realistic to cartoon-cute characters is accredited to Hideo Azuma, "The Father of Lolicon". In 1979, he penned Cybele, which offered the first depictions of sexual acts between cute, unrealistic Tezuka-style characters. This started a pornographic manga movement. The lolicon boom of the 1980s saw the rise of magazines such as the anthologies Lemon People and Petit Apple Pie. As the lolicon boom waned in the mid-1980s, the dominant form of representation for female characters became "baby faced and big chested" women. The shift in popularity from lolicon to bishōjo has been credited to Naoki Yamamoto (who wrote under the pen name of Tō Moriyama). Moriyama's manga had a style that had not been seen before at the time, and was different from the ero-gekiga and lolicon styles, and used bishōjo designs as a base to build upon. Moriyama's books sold well upon publication, creating even more fans for the genre. These new artists then wrote for magazines such as Monthly Penguin Club Magazine (1986) and Manga Hot Milk (1986) which became popular with their readership, drawing in new fans.

The publication of erotic materials in the United States can be traced back to at least 1990, when IANVS Publications printed its first Anime Shower Special. In March 1994, Antarctic Press released Bondage Fairies, an English translation of Insect Hunter, an "insect rape" manga which became popular in the American market, while it apparently had a poor showing in Japan. During this time, the one American publisher translating and publishing hentai was Fantagraphics on their adult comic imprint, Eros Comix, which was established around 1990.

=== Origin of erotic anime ===
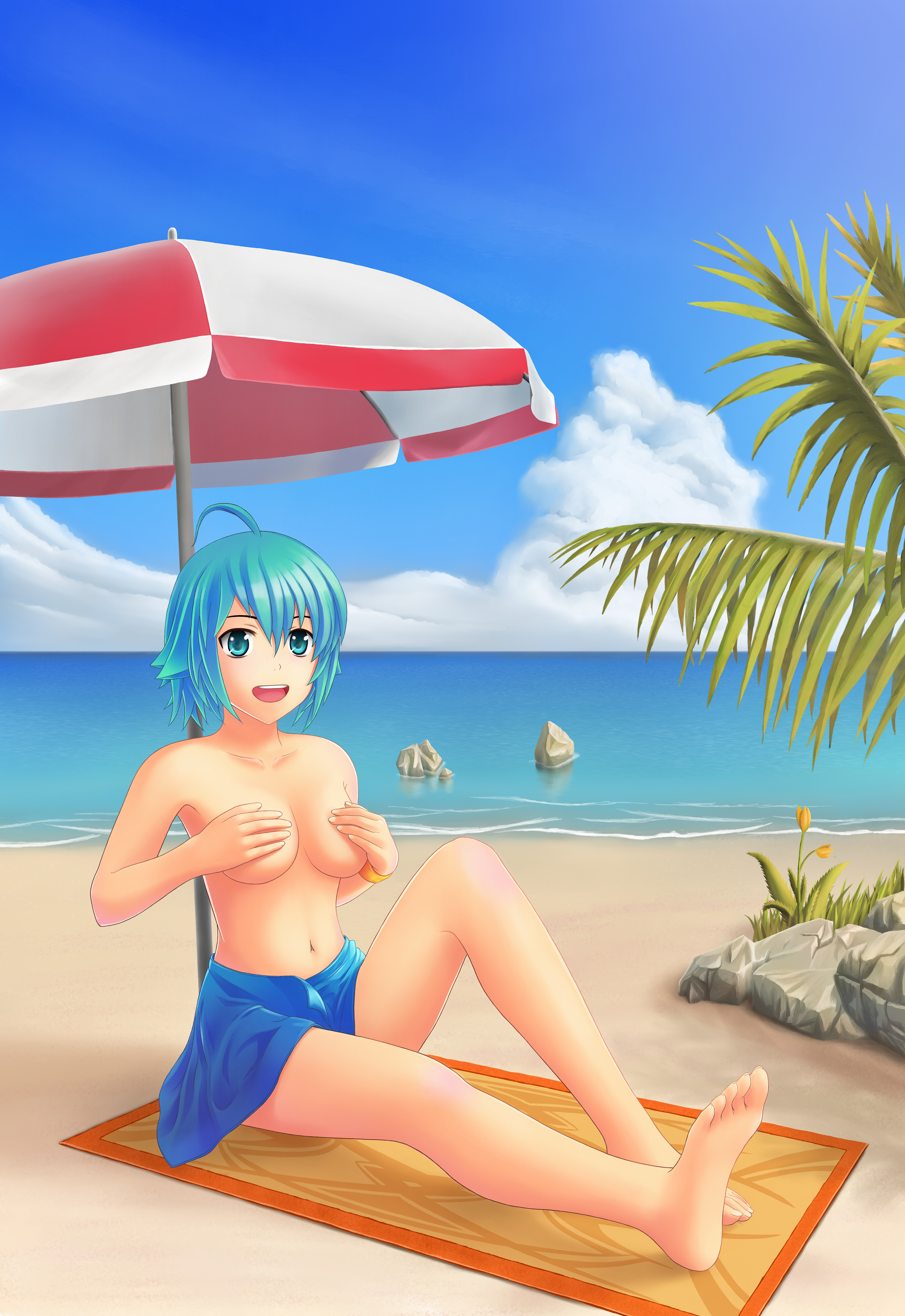
A woman drawn in erotic anime style at a beach

Hentai is typically defined as consisting of excessive nudity, and graphic sexual intercourse whether or not it is perverse. The term "ecchi" is typically related to fanservice, with no sexual intercourse being depicted.

The earliest pornographic anime was Suzumi-bune, created in 1932 by Hakusan Kimura. It was the first part of a two-reeler film, which was half complete before it was seized by the police. The remnants of the film were donated to the National Film Center in the early 21st century by the Tokyo police, who were removing all silver nitrate film in their possession, as it is extremely flammable. The film has never been viewed by the public.

Two early works escape being defined as hentai, but contain erotic themes. This is likely due to the obscurity and unfamiliarity of the works, arriving in the United States and fading from public focus a full 20 years before importation and surging interests coined the Americanized term hentai. The first is the 1969 film A Thousand and One Nights, which faithfully includes erotic elements of the original story. In 1970, Cleopatra: Queen of Sex, was the first animated film to carry an X rating, but it was mislabeled as erotica in the United States.

The Lolita Anime series is typically identified as the first erotic anime and original video animation (OVA); it was released in 1984 by Wonder Kids. Containing six episodes, the series focused on underage sex and rape, and included one episode containing BDSM bondage. Several sub-series were released in response, including a second Lolita Anime series released by Nikkatsu. It has not been officially licensed or distributed outside of its original release.

The Cream Lemon franchise of works ran from 1984 to 2005, with a number of them entering the American market in various forms. The Brothers Grime series released by Excalibur Films contained Cream Lemon works as early as 1986. However, they were not billed as anime and were introduced during the same time that the first underground distribution of erotic works began.

The American release of licensed erotic anime was first attempted in 1991 by Central Park Media, with I Give My All, but it never occurred. In December 1992, Devil Hunter Yohko was the first risque (ecchi) title that was released by A.D. Vision. While it contains no sexual intercourse, it pushes the limits of the ecchi category with sexual dialogue, nudity and one scene in which the heroine is about to be raped.

It was Central Park Media's 1993 release of Urotsukidōji which brought the first hentai film to American viewers. Often cited for inventing the tentacle rape subgenre, it contains extreme depictions of violence and monster sex. As such, it is acknowledged for being the first to depict tentacle sex on screen. When the film premiered in the United States, it was described as being "drenched in graphic scenes of perverse sex and ultra-violence".

Following this release, a wealth of pornographic content began to arrive in the United States, with companies such as A.D. Vision, Central Park Media and Media Blasters releasing licensed titles under various labels. A.D. Vision's label SoftCel Pictures released 19 titles in 1995 alone. Another label, Critical Mass, was created in 1996 to release an unedited edition of Violence Jack. When A.D. Vision's hentai label SoftCel Pictures shut down in 2005, most of its titles were acquired by Critical Mass. Following the bankruptcy of Central Park Media in 2009, the licenses for all Anime 18-related products and movies were transferred to Critical Mass.

=== Origin of erotic games ===
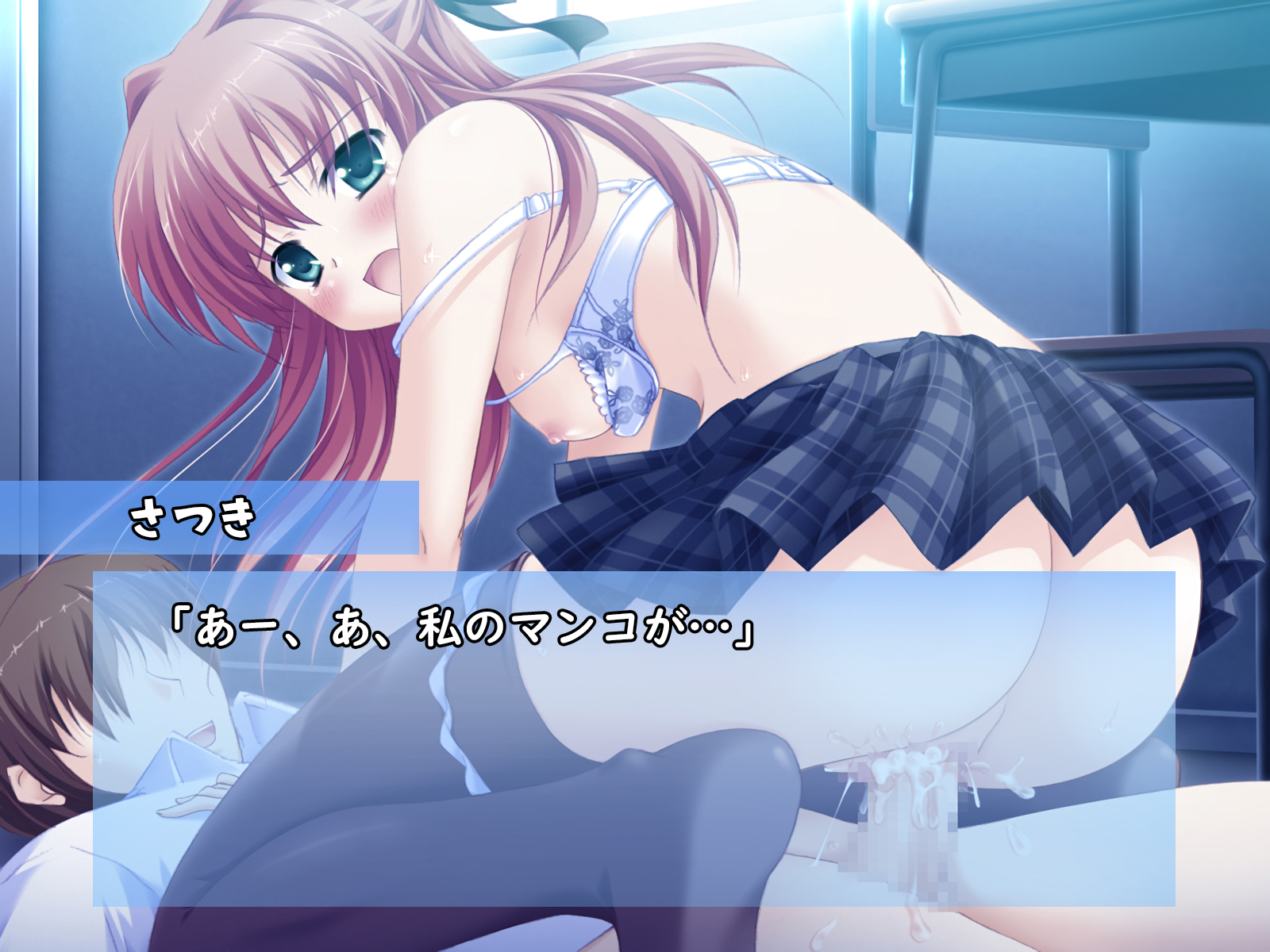
Image of an eroge (Japanese-style adult video game)

The term eroge (erotic game) literally defines any erotic game, but has become synonymous with video games depicting the artistic styles of anime and manga. The origins of eroge began in the early 1980s, while the computer industry in Japan was struggling to define a computer standard with makers like NEC, Sharp, and Fujitsu competing against one another. The PC98 series, despite lacking in processing power, CD drives and limited graphics, came to dominate the market, with the popularity of eroge games contributing to its success.

Because of vague definitions of what constitutes an "erotic game", there are several possible candidates for the first eroge. If the definition applies to adult themes, the first game was Softporn Adventure. Released in America in 1981 for the Apple II, this was a text-based comedic game from On-Line Systems. If eroge is defined as the first graphical depictions of Japanese adult themes, it would be Koei's 1982 release of Night Life. Sexual intercourse is depicted through simple graphic outlines. Notably, Night Life was not intended to be erotic so much as an instructional guide "to support married life". A series of "undressing" games appeared as early as 1983, such as "Strip Mahjong". The first anime-styled erotic game was Tenshitachi no Gogo, released in 1985 by JAST. In 1988, ASCII released the first erotic role-playing game, Chaos Angel. In 1989, AliceSoft released the turn-based role-playing game Rance and ELF released Dragon Knight.

In the late 1980s, eroge began to stagnate under high prices and the majority of games containing uninteresting plots and mindless sex. ELF's 1992 release of Dōkyūsei came as customer frustration with eroge was mounting and spawned a new genre of games called dating sims. Dōkyūsei was unique because it had no defined plot and required the player to build a relationship with different girls in order to advance the story. Each girl had her own story, but the prospect of consummating a relationship required the girl growing to love the player; there was no easy sex.

The term "visual novel" is vague, with Japanese and English definitions classifying the genre as a type of interactive fiction game driven by narration and limited player interaction. While the term is often retroactively applied to many games, it was Leaf that coined the term with their "Leaf Visual Novel Series" (LVNS) and the 1996 release of Shizuku and Kizuato. The success of these two dark eroge games would be followed by the third and final installment of the LVNS, the 1997 romantic eroge To Heart. Eroge visual novels took a new emotional turn with Tactics' 1998 release One: Kagayaku Kisetsu e. Key's 1999 release of Kanon proved to be a major success and would go on to have numerous console ports, two manga series and two anime series.

== Censorship ==
Japanese laws have impacted depictions of works since the Meiji Restoration, but these predate the common definition of hentai material. Since becoming law in 1907, Article 175 of the Criminal Code of Japan forbids the publication of obscene materials. Specifically, depictions of male–female sexual intercourse and pubic hair are considered obscene, but bare genitalia is not. As censorship is required for published works, the most common representations are the blurring dots on pornographic videos and "bars" or "lights" on still images. In 1986, Toshio Maeda sought to get past censorship on depictions of sexual intercourse, by creating tentacle sex. This led to the large number of works containing sexual intercourse with monsters, demons, robots, and aliens, whose genitals look different from men's. While Western views attribute hentai to any explicit work, it was the products of this censorship which became not only the first titles legally imported to America and Europe, but the first successful ones. While uncut for American release, the United Kingdom's release of Urotsukidōji removed many scenes of the violence and tentacle rape scenes. Another technique used to evade regulation was the "sexual intercourse cross-section view", an imaginary view of intercourse resembling an anatomic drawing or an MRI, which would eventually evolve as a prevalent expression in hentai for its erotic appeal. This expression is known in the Western world as the "x-ray view".

It was also because of this law that the artists began to depict the characters with a minimum of anatomical details and without pubic hair, by law, prior to 1991. Part of the ban was lifted when Nagisa Oshima prevailed over the obscenity charges at his trial for his film In the Realm of the Senses. Though not enforced, the lifting of this ban did not apply to anime and manga as they were not deemed artistic exceptions.

Alterations of material or censorship and banning of works are common. The US release of La Blue Girl altered the age of the heroine from 16 to 18, removed sex scenes with a dwarf ninja named Nin-nin, and removed the Japanese blurring dots. La Blue Girl was outright rejected by UK censors who refused to classify it and prohibited its distribution. In 2011, members of the Liberal Democratic Party of Japan sought a ban on the subgenre lolicon but were unsuccessful. The last law proposed against it was introduced on 27 May 2013 by the Liberal Democratic Party, the New Komei Party and the Japan Restoration Party that would have made possession of sexual images of individuals under 18 illegal with a fine of 1 million yen (about US$10,437) and less than a year in jail. The Japanese Democratic Party, along with several industry associations involved in anime and manga protested against the bill saying "while they appreciate that the bill protects children, it will also restrict freedom of expression". The law was ultimately passed in June 2014 after the regulation of lolicon anime and manga was removed from the bill. This new law went into full effect in 2015 banning real life child pornography.

== Societal effects of hentai ==
There is existing research on the social implications of pornography, in general, as it pertains to the sexualized and objectified image of women. In regards to how hentai particularly contributes to the conversation of the image of women, recent research identifies evidence in which hentai promotes rape myth acceptance, sexual violence, and racialization of women.

=== Rape myths ===
Recent studies have illustrated a correlation between the consumption of hentai and the promotion of rape myths. In particular, studies have shown how viewing hentai can lead to an increase in prejudiced and stereotypical perspectives on rape and sexual assault. Increased consumption can also lead to an increase in the normalization of sexual violence, rape, victim blaming, and further stereotypes associated with sexual violence and sexually aggressive behaviors. The origin and culture of hentai as "abnormal" pornography, as highlighted through research studies, is also described to perpetuate a desensitized view of sexual violence and rape play. The distinction between rape myth acceptance and sexually violent or aggressive behaviors has also been outlined in various research studies. Recent studies highlight how a rise in the acceptance of rape myths is causally linked to rape proclivity and sexually violent behaviors.

=== Racial fetishization of Asian women in hentai ===
==== History ====
The racial fetishization of Asian women can be traced back to Western colonialism and imperialism where Asian women were portrayed as "exotic" or submissive and such traits were in turn romanticized.

Classic media such as Madame Butterfly and Miss Saigon also portray Asian women having intimate relations with white men, ultimately to their demise. Critics say this perpetuates the notion that value of Asian women is tied to their white lovers.

A popular trope in hentai places the woman in a more submissive role, playing into the "lotus blossom" stereotype where Asian women are thought to be more docile. The increasing Western audience of hentai exacerbates this portrayal of Asian women.

==== Portrayals of Japanese women ====
Since hentai is a broad genre of erotic media, the portrayal of women varies greatly, however, almost always is the girl slim and with large breasts. A paper by Hinako Ishikawa on the racialization of Japanese women in hentai concluded that this portrayal directly plays into the sexual objectification and stereotyping of Japanese women.

==== Racial fetishization of Japanese women ====
Although the race of the female protagonists in hentai is not always clear, the film will often highlight the character's "Japanese-ness". This is done either through her clothes (wearing traditional dress like kimonos), the setting of the film, or her mannerisms (eating with chopsticks) that imply the character's race.

According to Ishikawa, this portrayal of Japanese women plays into the increasingly popularized Asian fetish in the Western world, specifically citing 2022's Pornhub statistics world wide trendy terms put "hentai" and "Japanese" as top two most searched words.

== Demographics ==
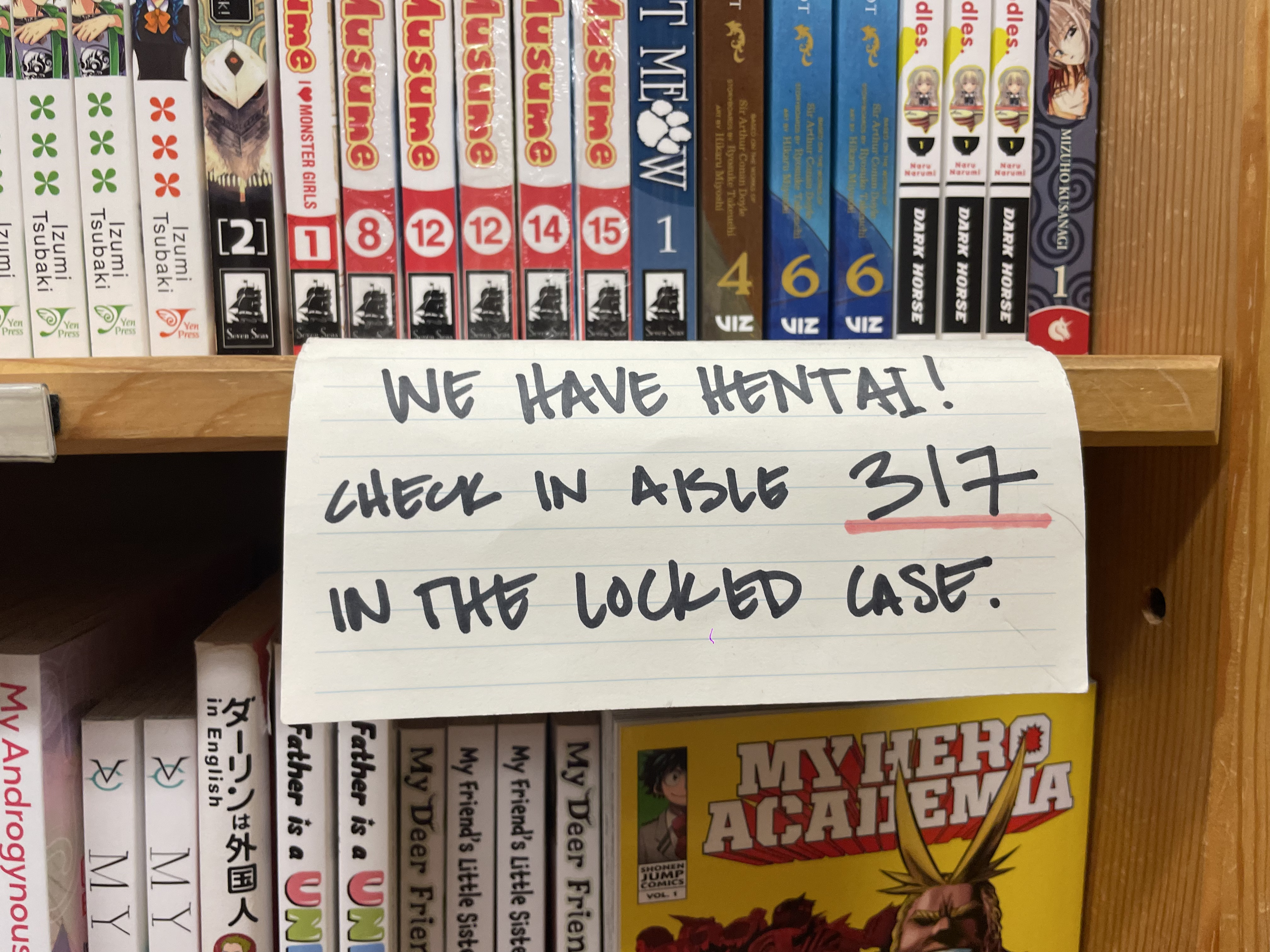
Hentai is often age-restricted.

According to data from Pornhub in 2017, the most prolific consumers of hentai are men. However, Patrick W. Galbraith and Jessica Bauwens-Sugimoto note that hentai manga attracts "a diverse readership, which of course includes women." Kathryn Hemmann also writes that "self-identified female otaku [...] readily admit to enjoying [hentai] dōjinshi catering to a male erotic gaze". When it comes to mediums of hentai, eroge games in particular combine three favored media—cartoons, pornography and gaming—into an experience. The hentai genre engages a wide audience that expands yearly, and desires better quality and storylines, or works which push the creative envelope. Nobuhiro Komiya, a manga censor, states that the unusual and extreme depictions in hentai are not about perversion so much as they are an example of the profit-oriented industry. Anime depicting normal sexual situations enjoy less market success than those that break social norms, such as sex at schools or bondage.

According to clinical psychologist Megha Hazuria Gorem, "Because toons are a kind of final fantasy, you can make the person look the way you want him or her to look. Every fetish can be fulfilled." Sexologist Narayan Reddy noted of eroge, "Animators make new games because there is a demand for them, and because they depict things that the gamers do not have the courage to do in real life, or that might just be illegal, these games are an outlet for suppressed desire."

== Classification ==
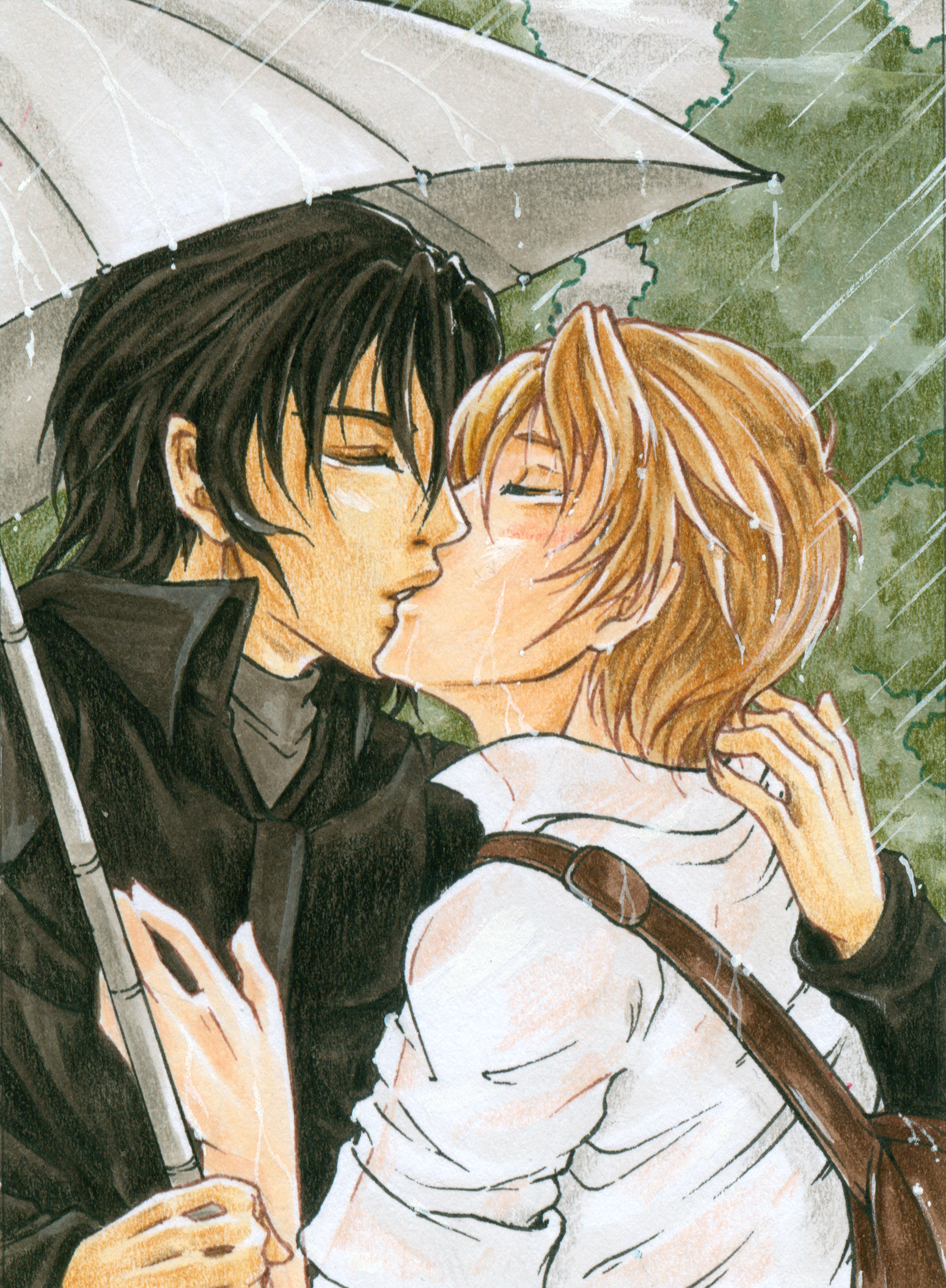
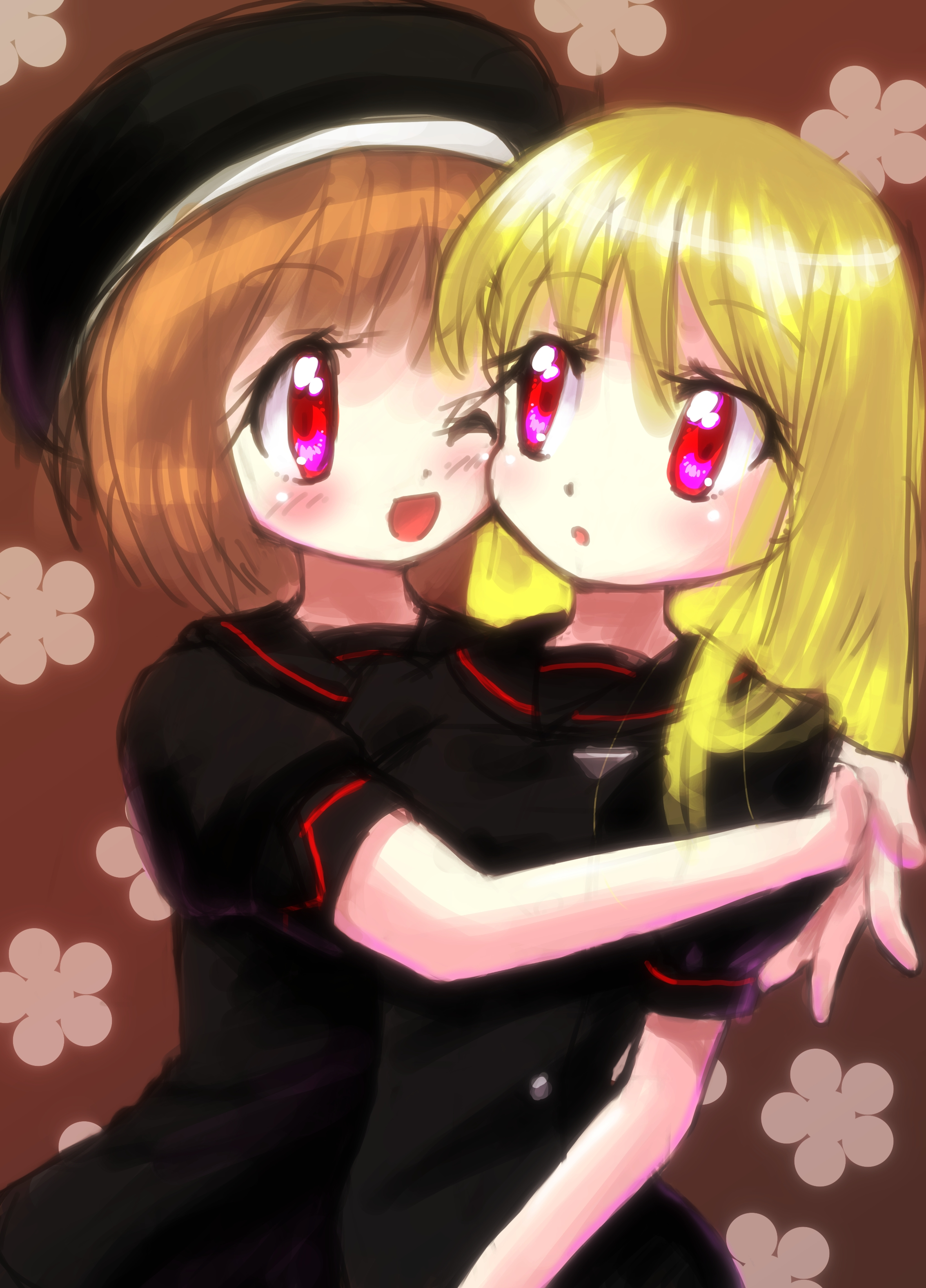
Left: a yaoi inspired artwork. Right: a yuri inspired artwork.

The hentai genre can be divided into numerous subgenres, the broadest of which encompasses heterosexual and homosexual acts. Hentai that features mainly heterosexual interactions occur in both male-targeted (ero or dansei-muke) and female-targeted ("ladies' comics") form. Those that feature mainly homosexual interactions are known as yaoi or Boys' Love (male–male) and yuri or Girls' Love (female–female). Both yaoi and, to a lesser extent, yuri, are generally aimed at members of the opposite sex from the persons depicted. While yaoi and yuri are not always explicit, their pornographic history and association remain. Yaoi's pornographic usage has remained strong in textual form through fanfiction. The definition of yuri has begun to be replaced by the broader definitions of "lesbian-themed animation or comics".

Hentai is perceived as "dwelling" on sexual fetishes. These include dozens of fetish and paraphilia related subgenres, which can be further classified with additional terms, such as heterosexual or homosexual types.

Many works are focused on depicting the mundane and the impossible across every conceivable act and situation, no matter how fantastical. One subgenre of hentai is futanari (hermaphroditism), which features a woman with a penis or penis-like appendage in addition to a vulva. Futanari characters are often depicted as having sex with other women, but many other works feature sex with men or, as in Anal Justice, with both genders. Futanari can be dominant, submissive, or switch between the two roles in a single work.

=== Genres ===
Common English terms	Common Japanese terms	Type	Description
Yaoi / shōnen-ai / Boys' Love	やおい / ボーイズ ラブ / ビーエル	Same-sex relationship	Male homosexuality
Yuri / shōjo-ai / Girls' Love	百合	Same-sex relationship	Female homosexuality
Lolicon	ロリコン	Gender and age	Centered on prepubescent, pubescent, or post-pubescent underage girls, whether solo (one girl), heterosexual (man/girl or boy/girl) or homosexual (woman/girl or girl/girl)
Shotacon	ショタコン	Gender and age	Centered on prepubescent, pubescent, or post-pubescent underage boys, whether solo (one boy), heterosexual (woman/boy or girl/boy) or homosexual (man/boy or boy/boy)
Bakunyū / Hinnyuū	爆乳 / 貧乳		A genre of pornographic media focusing on the depiction of women's contrasting breast sizes, with emphasis on large breasts and flat-chested breasts, respectively. The word can be literally translated to "exploding breasts". Bakunyū is a subgenre within the genre of hentai anime.
Catgirl / nekomimi	猫耳		Human females with cat characteristics, such as cat ears, cat tails and whiskers
Futanari / Otokofutanari / Gyaku-futanari	ふたなり / 男ふたなり / 逆ふたなり		Sometimes synonymous with hermaphrodite (shiyuudoutai). In futanari, depictions of female-gendered women that have both breasts, phallic genitalia (penis either with or without scrotum) and a yonic genitalia; sometimes no vagina. In otokofutanari, instead of a woman, it's a male-gendered man with a penis, a vagina, and muscles instead of boobs. In gyaku-futanari (reverse-futanari), instead of replacing a woman's vagina with a penis, replace a man's penis with a vagina. (This never counts as a hermaphrodite; In English, analogous term for it is "cuntboy").
Incest / Inseki	近親相姦 / 姻戚		Sexual activity with family members. In inseki stories, the protagonist has sexual activities with family members not related by blood.
Netorare / Netorase / Netori / Netoridere	寝取られ / ネトラセーゼ / 寝取り		Related to consensual and non-consensual swinging, infidelity and/or cuckolding, abbreviated NTR; variations of being masochistically aroused by seeing or knowing that one's spouse or lover is having sexual intercourse with another person, whether they do so voluntarily or not, lit. "being snatched away". In netorare, the protagonist's adulterous partner wants to deceive and/or break up with the protagonist to be with the cheater. These cuckolded characters don't like being cheated on and are humiliated by it. In netorase, the protagonist enjoys, actively encourages or even causes the partner to have sex with others, often with their informed knowledge and consent. In netori, the protagonist finds a cheater in a marriage or relationship and manipulates/blackmails them away from their cucked partner. Netoridere, blending "netorare" with the "-dere" (“to be lovestruck”) archetype suffix, describes trope characterized by a mix of affection and betrayal; or a character who enjoys cheating on their partner or seeing their partner cheat on them.
Hiyake Ato / After sunburn	日焼け後		Depictions of fetish revolves around tan lines, Gyaru and bimbofication
Futomomo / Mae kara mieru oshiri	太もも / 前から見えるお尻		Depictions of fetish revolves around thick thighs and large buttocks, respectively, that protrude to the front, making them visible from any angle; especially between the thighs when viewed from the front. Common in hentai and anime.
Mekosuji / Camel toe	メコスジ		Depictions of fetish revolves around silhouette of women's vulva and men's penis and scrotum, from tight or see-through underwear
Omorashi	おもらし / お漏らし		A form of urolagnia
Ryona / Gyaku-ryona / Onna Zako	リョナ / 逆リョナ / 女ザコ		Depictions of fetish revolves around a victim being physically assaulted or psychologically abused by an offender;
Tentacle erotica	触手責め		Depictions of tentacled creatures and sometimes monsters (fictional or otherwise) engaging in sex or rape with women and, less often, men
Josō-seme / cross-dressing attack	女装攻め		Depictions of a kathoey, male-crossdresser or tomgirl taking the lead (i.e. the "seme") or exhibiting dominance over a sexual partner

== See also ==
- Cartoon pornography – Cartoon characters in sexual situations
- Dōjinshi – Japanese self-published print works
- Fakku – American adult entertainment company
- List of hentai anime
- List of hentai authors

(groups, studios, production companies, circles)

- Nijikon – Attraction to two-dimensional characters
- Panchira – Japanese word referring to upskirt images
- Uniform fetishism – Sexual fetishism relating to uniforms
