= 16bit Sensation =

Japanese manga series

- 16bit Sensation: Watashi to Minna ga Tsukutta Bishōjo Game
- First tankōbon volume cover

16bitセンセーション 私とみんなが作った美少女ゲーム (Jūroku Bitto Sensēshon Watashi to Minna ga Tsukutta Bishōjo Gēmu)
- Genre: Comedy; Science fiction
- Manga
- Written by: Misato Mitsumi (original concept); Tatsuki Amazuyu (original concept); Tamiki Wakaki
- Illustrated by: Tamiki Wakaki
- Published by: Kadokawa Shoten
- Original run: December 31, 2016 – present
- Volumes: 2
- Anime television series

16bit Sensation: Another Layer
- Directed by: Takashi Sakuma
- Written by: Tatsuya Takahashi; Tamiki Wakaki
- Music by: Yashikin
- Studio: Studio Silver
- Licensed by: Crunchyroll; SEA: Muse Communication
- Original network: Tokyo MX, GYT, GTV, BS11, CTV, ABC, AT-X
- Original run: October 5, 2023 – December 28, 2023
- Episodes: 13
- icon

16bit Sensation: Watashi to Minna ga Tsukutta Bishōjo Game (Japanese: 16bitセンセーション 私とみんなが作った美少女ゲーム, Hepburn: Jūroku Bitto Sensēshon Watashi to Minna ga Tsukutta Bishōjo Gēmu; '16bit Sensation: The Bishōjo Game Made by All of You and I') is a Japanese manga conceptualized by Misato Mitsumi, Tatsuki Amazuyu, and Tamiki Wakaki and illustrated by Wakaki. It was first launched as a dōjinshi at Comic Market 91 in December 2016; Kadokawa Shoten started publishing it in collected tankōbon volumes in September 2020, with two volumes released as of November 2021. An anime television series adaptation, titled 16bit Sensation: Another Layer and produced by Studio Silver, aired from October to December 2023.

== Plot ==
16bit Sensation focuses on Meiko Uehara, an artist working at the game studio Alcohol Soft. Meiko and her co-workers work together to develop games for the PC-98 platform, as well as attending events such as Comiket, with the manga showing various stages of game development.

16bit Sensation: Another Layer focuses on Konoha Akisato, a budding illustrator who works for the video game developer Blue Bell. Because Blue Bell is struggling under the current market conditions, she instead works on more menial tasks, in contrast to her expectations about working in the video game industry. After encountering a mysterious video game store, she finds herself transported to the year 1992, where she encounters Alcohol Soft, whose offices were previously located in what is now Blue Bell's location.

Unable to return to the present, Konoha starts living at Alcohol Soft's office and helps them with their artwork, using her knowledge of the future to turn Alcohol Soft from a struggling video game company to a more successful one. She also comes into conflict with Mamoru Rokuda, the son of Alcohol Soft's owner and a strong proponent of the PC-98, in contrast to the impending popularity of Microsoft Windows, with Mamoru unable to come to terms with the changing video game and computer landscape.

== Characters ==
=== Alcohol Soft ===
Meiko Uehara (上原 メイ子, Uehara Meiko)
Voiced by: Yui Horie
The protagonist of the manga series. She works at Alcohol Soft as a concept and line art illustrator, and is learning to become a programmer. She pushes to give Konoha a chance at Alcohol Soft.
Mamoru Rokuda (六田 守, Rokuda Mamoru)
Voiced by: Atsushi Abe
He works as a programmer at Alcohol Soft, and is the son of the company owner. Despite Alcohol Soft focusing on bishōjo games, he has little interest in the genre, instead having a passion for programming. Some years later, he is still at the company, but refuses to make a game on a computer system using Windows 95 as he is very dedicated to the PC-98 platform. In the seventh episode of the anime, he is transported back in time. In the present timeline, he assists Konoha in her time travels. He is the only staff member in Alcohol Soft who knows that Konoha came from the future.
Kaori Shimoda (下田 かおり, Shimoda Kaori)
Voiced by: Ayako Kawasumi
She works at Alcohol Soft as a concept art, line art, and CG illustrator. In 1992, she and Meiko bring Konoha into the building after she asks Mamoru for help. Later, she asks Konoha to bring back Mamoru, who refuses to work on any game except one produced with PC-98. In the original manga series, and in some episodes of the anime adaptation, she is often seen wearing a cat hat.
Masaru Rokuda (六田 勝, Rokuda Masaru)
Voiced by: Kentarō Itō
The manager of Alcohol Soft. He is Mamoru's father. He later gets unknowingly involved with financial fraud, almost bringing down Alcohol Soft.
Kiyoshi Gomikawa (五味川 清, Gomikawa Kiyoshi)
Voiced by: Jun Fukushima
He is a scenario writer at Alcohol Soft and often wears a mask covering his eyes.

=== Alcohol Soft (Another Layer) ===
Konoha Akisato (秋里 コノハ, Akisato Konoha)
Voiced by: Aoi Koga
The protagonist of the anime series. She is a 19-year-old budding illustrator working at the video game company Blue Bell, who finds herself in the year 1992 and does part-time work for Alcohol Soft. She is very passionate about bishōjo games. She has a fang, and usually speaks in the third person. Konoha is an anime-original character, although she appears in the final chapter of the manga series.

=== Other characters ===
Toya Yamada (山田 冬夜, Yamada Tōya)
Voiced by: Aya Yamane
A 19-year-old shy girl who Konoha meets, when she time travels to 1996, and buys eroge bishōjo games with Konoha's moral support. When she comes upon Konoha later, in 1999, she is a well-known illustrator who is promoting her game. In the future, she becomes the CEO of a large video game company.

== Media ==
=== Manga ===
Illustrated by Tamiki Wakaki, in collaboration with Misato Mitsumi and Tatsuki Amazuyu on the story, and based on their real-life experiences at Aquaplus, 16bit Sensation was first distributed as a dōjinshi at Comic Market on December 31, 2016. Kadokawa Shoten started publishing the manga in collected tankōbon volumes on September 14, 2020. As of November 6, 2021, two volumes have been released.

==== Volumes ====
No.	Japanese release date	Japanese ISBN
1	September 14, 2020	978-4-04-109755-7
2	November 6, 2021	978-4-04-111605-0

=== Anime ===
In December 2022, it was announced that the manga would receive an anime adaptation. The adaptation was later announced by Aniplex at AnimeJapan to be a television series titled 16bit Sensation: Another Layer. It was animated by Studio Silver and directed by Takashi Sakuma, with an original story written by Tatsuya Takahashi and Wakaki, character designs by Masakatsu Sakaki, and music composed by Yashikin. It aired from October 5 to December 28, 2023, on Tokyo MX and other networks. (Note: Tokyo MX listed the series premiere at 24:30 on October 4, 2023, which is October 5 at 12:30 a.m.) The opening theme song is "65535", performed by Shoko Nakagawa, while the ending theme song is "Link~past and future~", performed by Aoi Koga as her character Konoha Akisato. Crunchyroll streamed the series. Muse Communication licensed the series in Southeast Asia.

==== Episodes ====
No.	Title (Note: All English titles are taken from Crunchyroll.)	Directed by (Note: Information is taken from the ending credits of each episode.)	Written by	Storyboarded by	Original release date
1	"I Traveled Back in Time!?"; Transliteration: "Taimurīpu shi chatta ～a!?" (Japanese: タイムリープしちゃったぁ～！？)	Kentaro Mizuno	Gō Zappa	Takashi Sakuma	October 5, 2023
In the year 2023, Konoha Akisato works at a bishōjo game company called Blue Bell. However, she is dispirited with her job, as she often only colors in the backs of male characters. One day, she goes inside an old video game store and looks at well-known bishōjo games. When she comes back later on, the store has disappeared and all that is left is a paper bag with the games inside. At a nearby cafe, she looks at the games inside. She opens one of the games, Dōkyūsei, and soon realizes she is in the year 1992, causing her to panic. She stumbles across Mamoru Rokuda and laments she has time traveled.
2	"Let's Make Bishojo Games Together!"; Transliteration: "Issho ni Bishōjo Gēmu Tsukuro!" (Japanese: いっしょに美少女ゲーム作ろ！)	Naoyoshi Kusaka	Tatsuya Takahashi	Tetsuya Watanabe	October 12, 2023
After leaving Mamoru, Konoha tries to get her bearings and attempts to figure out if she actually time traveled. She realizes that she is in 1992 and asks Mamoru for help. She goes inside the building of Alcohol Soft and soon realizes it makes bishōjo games. She applies to work at the company and believes that her skills from 2023 can be used to her advantage to work on "ancient machines". This soon dissipates when she sees that illustrators are drawing with a computer mouse, rather than a pen. Mamoru teaches her how to use the illustration program. Over time, she gets better at using it and she helps them complete the game, Sunny with a Chance of Vacation. She is later thrust back to the year 2023.
3	"I Wanted to See All of You Again!"; Transliteration: "Mōichido Minna ni Aitakute!" (Japanese: もう一度みんなに会いたくて！)	Fumio Maezono	Tatsuya Takahashi	Shinichi Watanabe	October 19, 2023
Konoha laments that she cannot travel back to the past. When she learns that she had indeed worked on Sunny with a Chance of Vacation, Konoha asks around local game stores about Alcohol Soft and gets zero leads. She tries to retrace her steps and chases a dog which takes her copy of Kizuato, causing her to time travel to 1996. She finds Alcohol Soft, but her copy of Kizuato disappears, seemingly rendering any future time travel impossible. Konoha gets back into Alcohol Soft and begins working on a computer running on Windows 95. However, she is later asked to bring back Mamoru to the office, who refuses to make the game with that operating system, and only wants to make it as a PC-98 exclusive game. After meeting a woman named Toya Yamada and coming with her to buy bishōjo games at Messe Sanoh, Konoha finds Mamoru at a computer store, who reveals why he is not at work. Mamoru then tells her that if she is a time traveler, she should not do anything to change history or interfere with what he is doing. She vows to bring him back, no matter what.
4	"It's Fine!"; Transliteration: "Iin Dayo!" (Japanese: いいんだよ！)	Hisoka Maejima	Tatsuya Takahashi	Shinichi Watanabe	October 26, 2023
Konoha goes to Mamoru's apartment in an attempt to get him to come back to Alcohol Soft, but he refuses to do so. Meanwhile, Kaori and Meiko watch a preview for the visual novel Shizuku and marvel at the audio used. Konoha comes back into the office to get a sleeping bag so she can try to get Mamoru back with an overnight camp-out. On her way to Mamoru's apartment, she eats with Toya, who tells her she loves bishōjo games. Later, Konoha sleeps out near Mamoru's apartment. After she falls asleep, Mamoru looks at the tablet she brought with her. The employees at Alcohol Soft talk about why Mamoru does not want to come back. He later appears in a costume at Comiket and accepts that PC-98 is dead. Konoha tells him to work as hard as he can to make the PC-98 survive. Following Konoha's meeting with Toya, Mamoru ultimately agrees to come back if they can make a game for PC-98 and Windows. Once the game is completed, Konoha shows Mamoru the art she made before she disappears again.
5	"Good Things Come in Threes!"; Transliteration: "Nido Atta Koto wa Sando Aru!" (Japanese: 2度あったことは3度ある！)	Shikarichiro Ito	Gō Zappa	Toshihiko Masuda	November 2, 2023
Once Konoha returns to the present, she realizes she is being sent back to the years the games were first released. After she notices some games are missing on her shelf, she opens Kanon and is transported to the year 1999. Konoha reunites with the members of Alcohol Soft, which has now become a big video game company following their game Horoscope becoming a huge hit, resulting in new hires. Konoha reveals to Mamoru how her time travel works. Just then, the manager, who is always off partying, shows up and declares their next game will be released on console. When a legendary producer from Diamond Studios named Hikaru Ichigaya comes in to pitch the idea, the employees agree with the idea. Konoha and Mamoru talk about her time travel, and she says she came to 1999 because she wanted to make a game. The members of Alcohol Soft soon divide up the work, but Konoha decides to only do chores part-time, so she does not influence anything. Later, Mamoru informs Konoha of his suspicion of Ichigaya and decides to look into the matter.
6	"Believe in Me!"; Transliteration: "Konoha wo Shinjite!" (Japanese: コノハを信じて！)	Kentaro Mizuno	Gō Zappa	Atsushi Ōtsuki	November 9, 2023
Konoha is tasked with doing a stakeout of a club where the manager attends. Meanwhile, Kaori and Meiko go with Ichigaya to a TV studio where they meet an anime producer. Back at the stakeout, Konoha comes across Toya. When Toya offers to have dinner with Konoha as thanks for inspiring her, the latter turns it down due to the manager's arrival. Inside the club, the manager reveals he owns it. Konoha records this and plays it for everyone in the office. As the manager defends himself over the investment he made, it is revealed that Ichigaya was arrested for fraud. Because of this, Alcohol Soft now finds itself in debt. Mamoru later reveals that his father is hospitalized due to the shock of what happened and Mamoru believes he could have prevented this or paid attention to what his father was doing. Konoha tells Mamoru they should make a game together, which he ultimately agrees.
7	"Every Storm Hardens the Earth"; Transliteration: "Ame Futte Ji Katamaru" (Japanese: 雨降って地固まる)	Fumio Maezono	Yūichirō Higashide	Suizokuen Asagaya & Yoshihiro Sugai	November 16, 2023
Realizing the pressure is on her to make the game, Konoha plays the opening theme of Puella Magi Madoka Magica, "Connect", on her phone as an inspiration. She then shares her idea with her fellow co-workers, showing them a drawing on her tablet. While they are impressed with her drawing, Kaori says it is impossible to replicate. Mamoru soon unveils a supercomputer, which he calls the Super Octa-Core, consisting of interconnected and overclocked PC-9821 Ra models. When Kaori asks Konoha if she is going to disappear again, the latter reassures her. Meanwhile at the hospital, the manager is still in shock over what happened. Back at Alcohol Soft, Konoha is able to convince the new workers to embrace her game. Later, she proposes making body pillows for the game. The manager shows up thinking Ichigaya gave his money back. In actuality, he left behind the materials for the console port. As such, the manager agrees to fund the budget needed to make Konoha's game a reality. Several months later, Mamoru is transported through time after he opens one of the games, Tenshitachi no Gogo, in Konoha's backpack.
8	"Echo"; Transliteration: "Ekō" (Japanese: エコー)	Keiichi Sasajima	Ryō Morise	Keiichi Sasajima	November 23, 2023
Mamoru awakes and meets two members of Echosoft, both named Echo, where Alcohol Soft is located in the 1990s. He runs out and finds the PC-9801VM to confirm it is 1985. Mamoru is soon hired as a part-time worker and does programming on bishōjo games. The manager, Echo, composes background music using Music Macro Language and programming for the game's characters, with Mamoru showing him the dithering technique. The other assistant, Echo Two, asks Mamoru for his opinion on the clothes she wears. When Echo says he comes from a place that has no imagination, Mamoru attempts to show him what it is. One day, Echo Two disappears for a week without warning. After searching, Mamoru eventually finds her. While she does not know what "worried" means, she decides to go back with him to Echosoft. Later, Echo and Echo Two merge after both realize they know what imagination means. Mamoru meets Echo up on the roof, who says everything has been created thanks to "shared imagination". Echo and Echo Two wish him farewell and Mamoru is transported back to 1999. He tries to collect himself and realizes everything he bought in 1985 was left behind.
9	"See You Later!"; Transliteration: "Matane!" (Japanese: またね！)	Hisoka Maejima	Suzuki Ōtsuki	Keiichi Sasajima	November 30, 2023
In December 1999, Alcohol Soft is busy working on the game. Once they are finished, they celebrate the completion of it, which is titled The Last Waltz. Meiko admits to Konoha that she was ashamed of making bishōjo games in the past, but no longer feels that way and says she wants the world to play their game. Later, they all travel to the Dejiko building where Konoha feels like she is fading away. She meets Toya again, who says they are about the enter the "age of bishōjo" and reveals she is going to start her own company. She then asks Konoha to join her. Meanwhile, Mamoru finds a game made by Echosoft at a video game store, realizes he time traveled, and thinks that Echo altered the games, with Comic Party being the only one left. Konoha and Mamoru talk about the peculiarities of their time travel and the prospect of The Last Waltz being a hit before the former disappears. Once she wakes up, Konoha discovers everything in Akihabara has changed, much to her shock. She then comes across an older looking Mamoru.
10	"I'll Give it All I've Got!"; Transliteration: "Seīppai Yattemiru!" (Japanese: 精一杯やってみる！)	Takuma Suzuki	Suzuki Ōtsuki	Toshihiko Masuda	December 7, 2023
Konoha learns from Mamoru, now the manager of Alcohol Soft, that the 2023 she came into is that of one where The Last Waltz was a smash hit, causing all development of bishōjo games to shift to the United States, and all bishōjo is practically created in America, killing the local video game industry. As a result, the Akihabara she knew is gone as it became a residential district. She also finds out that everyone at Alcohol Soft have moved to America, where all of them are considered legends in the industry. While she is alone, Konoha watches Toya, now a successful developer, announce a merger of her company with another. Mamoru reveals he only stayed behind because of his dedication to the PC-98. While Konoha does not like this version of Akihabara, she does not want to mess with what happened to Alcohol Soft. Mamoru has a suggestion: for her to go back in time, around the time The Last Waltz was created, and develop that game but with a rival company, using a copy of Comic Party. That way, Alcohol Soft will still be successful while the bishōjo culture stays preserved in Japan.
11	"Original Cuu"; Transliteration: "Orijinaru・Kyū" (Japanese: オリジナル・キュー)	Kentaro Mizuno	Suzuki Ōtsuki	Hikaru Takeuchi & Koji Yoshikawa	December 14, 2023
As they work together, Konoha is worried that there is too much pressure to do everything. Mamoru reveals she can make a game by herself with help of artificial intelligence. He then trains his private AI on Konoha's previous illustrations. He points out, however, that while AI cannot create "passion" like humans can, the video game market is flooded with AI-produced games. After a few days, Konoha is still struggling, saying she used all her talent on The Last Waltz. Mamoru warns her that she is getting older and adapting to this timeline may cause her to lose the memories of her timeline. While she is alone, Konoha unexpectedly receives a call from Toya before she is kidnapped. Elsewhere, Toya learns what happened from the representative of the company hers merged with in order to get the creator of "the original Cuu". Konoha later finds herself in a strange place where humans are trapped inside tanks. Meanwhile, when Mamoru calls Konoha and does not get an answer, he starts up all his PC-98s to find out where she went.
12	"U... U-U-U-U-U..."; Transliteration: "Yu, yu yu yu yu yu…!" (Japanese: ゆ、ゆゆゆゆゆ…！)	Naoyoshi Kusaka	Yūichirō Higashide	Suizokuen Asagaya & Yoshihiro Sugai	December 21, 2023
Mamoru frantically searches for Konoha with the help of his PC-98s. He finds that an unspecified vehicle with Konoha stopped by Akihabara Stadium. Once there, he sees strangely-looking security people walking around, and he uses the Joban New Line Project to get him part of the way there. Meanwhile, a terrified Konoha is surrounded by robots. Later, Mamoru uses the lax security of the Akihabara underground to his advantage while Toya stops the robots from surrounding Konoha. Planet Games CEO Glenn Faulkner tells Konoha that she is in the "development room" with the 200 people trapped in the tanks providing cybernetic intelligence all-year without breaks for the company's games, rather than AI. Toya asks Konoha to enter a CI but she refuses. Mamoru comes across a strange game debugging room. Toya argues that she had to accept the merger with Planet Games and Mamoru hears her cries for help. She apologizes for causing the time-space disruption. Mamoru and Konoha flee, with Toya pleading with Faulkner to not pursue them. When she tries to take Konoha's place in the CI, Faulkner turns her down. Elsewhere, Konoha and Mamoru are seemingly surrounded when a UFO appears to their astonishment.
13	"The Things I Hold Dear"; Transliteration: "Watashi no Taisetsu na Mono" (Japanese: わたしの大切なもの)	Tomoya Tanaka & Hisoka Maejima	Tatsuya Takahashi	Takashi Sakuma	December 28, 2023
Echo Two beams down to Earth to the shock of everyone in Akihabara. Mamoru and Konoha soon find themselves in a strange place where they meet Echo. Konoha gives Echo an autograph on a white-colored box, which contains a video game she creates in the future. He then shows Mamoru and Konoha what "human imagination" looks like. After everyone parts ways, Toya meets with Mamoru and Konoha. Kaori and Meiko descend from a helicopter, followed by Kiyoshi and Masaru. Despite the promise they made, Toya says she has no right to make a game with Konoha due to her actions. Other members of Alcohol Soft arrive as well and they all work on the new game together. Later, Mamoru gives Konoha a letter to hand him in 1999. Sometime after, she opens Comic Party and goes back to 1999, where she finds herself in the Akihabara she is familiar with. When she pledges to stay there and make video games, she sees a message on a PC-98 welcoming her, and meets Mamoru again. Both agree to make games together.

== Reception ==
The anime adaptation was received positively. Christopher Farris reviewed the first three episodes for Anime News Network, noting how it is a series steeped in "niche nostalgia" with references that only some would know, arguing that Konoha is an energetic and effective guide to introduce audiences to this nostalgia, and praising the performance of her voice actress, Aoi Koga. Farris also notes the cultural framework of the adaptation, which is partially a spinoff from the original manga which "entirely took place in the 1990s," and notes the unique approach of the series to its material, and to otaku culture. In her review of the first episode, Cy Catwell of Anime Feminist noted that it tells a story of how Konoha gets a "second chance" to use her passion to more than "her current job" in 2023, called it "really cute", and said there was a potential for the series to become a feminist series which engages with "the feminine experience with eroticism and adult media".

In the three-episode check-in on Anime Feminist, Alex Henderson said the series was becoming "something entertaining and pretty interesting," as a "love letter" to the 1990s, said they are enjoying the characters, and hoped that Mamoru and Konoha did not become "love interests". Steven Blackburn of Screen Rant said that the series offers "a unique twist on the typical isekai genre," with parallels between her predicament in 2023 and where she ends up after opening a game. Hosts of Anime News Network's "This Week in Anime" noted that Konoha proselytizes about the "storied output" of Key and other works, describing Konoha as a "wondrous recreation of a modern nerd".
