= Nonkina Tōsan =

Nonkina Tōsan (ノンキナトウサン; also spelled 呑気なとうさん or のんきな父さん; Easygoing Dad or Carefree Dad) is an early manga comic strip by Yutaka Asō, first published in 1923, in the newspaper Hochi Shinbun.

The strip follows the antics created by the main character "Nonkina Tōsan (Easygoing Daddy)" and his partner "Neighbor Taishō" ( Tonari no Taishō (隣のタイショウ) ". Inspired by American comics, especially Bringing Up Father, was one of the pioneering yonkoma, becoming a success, generating a number of merchandising items and adaptations to animated shorts and feature films.

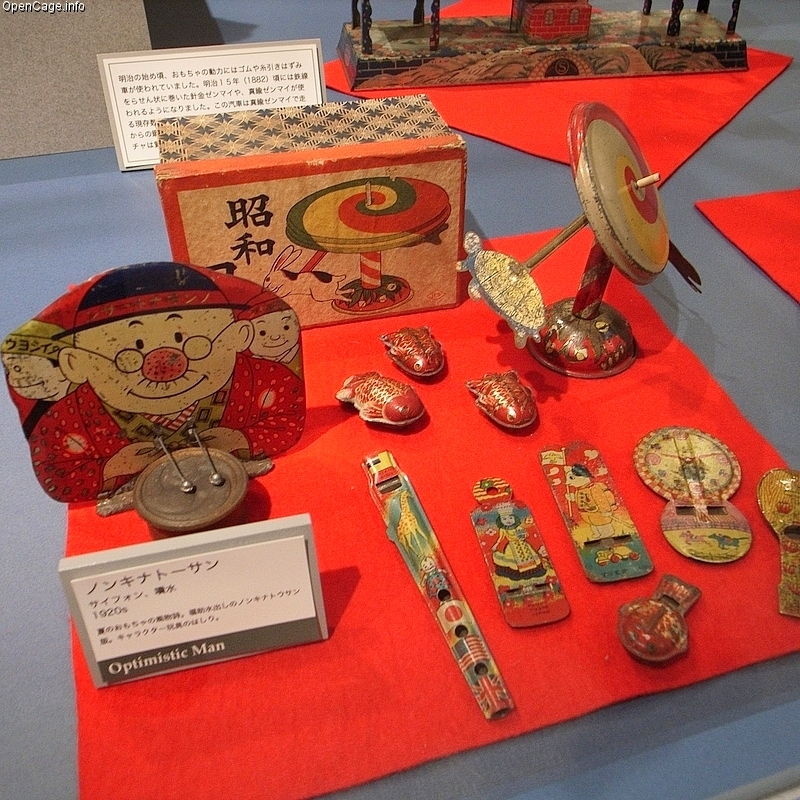
1920s Nonkina Tōsan toys on display on the Arima Toys & Automata Museum.

== History ==
Nonkina Tōsan was originally an eight-panel cartoon titled "呑気なとうさん" (renamed "のんきな父さん" from the May 27 issue of the same year and changed to a six-panel cartoon from the October 28 issue of the same year) that had been serialized irregularly in the "Sunday Manga " section of the Hochi Shimbun since April 29, 1923. In an attempt to soothe the pain of the people affected by the Great Kanto Earthquake in September of that year and the chronic recession that preceded it, Tomoichirō Takada, then editorial director of the Hochi Shimbun, considered serializing a cheerful comic strip in the paper and selected the work by Asō, a rookie comic strip artist. At the time, George McManus' Bringing Up Father, (serialized as Oyaji Kyoiku in Asahi Graph) was a popular comic strip, and Aso was reluctant to start serializing it, saying that he did not think he could compete with it in any way, but eventually accepted.

After the serialization began, the circulation of Hochi Shimbun increased, and Asō became a popular manga artist. The color version of the book became a bestseller, and it became a social phenomenon at the end of the Taishō era, with advertisements using characters and merchandise such as dolls and hand towels being created. It has even become a buzzword, with men with a carefree demeanor being called nontou (ノントウ). In October 1926, the series ended temporarily due to Asō's trip to Europe. After returning to Japan, in 1929, serialization resumed under the title Zoku Nonkina tosan (続ノンキナトウサン) in the Yomiuri Sunday Manga page of the Sunday edition of Yomiuri Shimbun.

From the November 26 issue of the same year, it was moved to the Yukan Hochi Shimbun, with the title changed to ノンキナトウサン and the format changed to a 4-panel comic, serialized every day on the top left of the front page. It seems that the panel layout, speech bubbles, and simplified character depictions were influenced by Bringing Up Father, and in the early serializations, the dialogue was written horizontally and in katakana. Over the course of the series, the panel layout changed from 2x2 to 1x4 vertically.

After the war, in 1945, Asō serialized Nonkina tosan again in Daiichi Shimbun. Asō died in 1961, so the copyright ended before 2019, when the copyright was extended to 70 years after the author's death, and the work entered the public domain.

== Films ==
Ryūgūmairi

Nonkina Tōsan ryūgūmairi
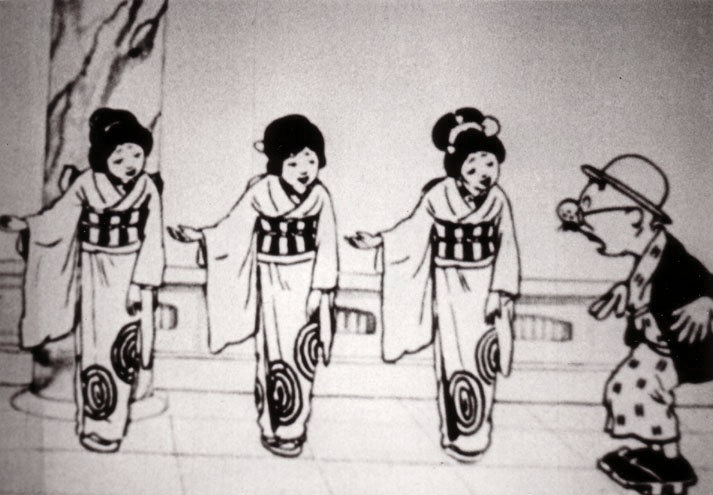
- Directed by: Hakuzan Kimura
- Production companies: Azuma Eigasha; Asahi Cinema
- Release date: August 1925
- Country: Japan
- Language: Japanese

Nonkina Tōsan ryūgūmairi ( ノンキナトウサン 竜宮参り; Carefree Dad's visit to Ryūgū palace ) is a Japanese short silent animated film produced and released in 1925. Written and directed by Hakuzan Kimura. Produced by Azuma Eigasha (Takamatsu Azuma Production) and Asahi Cinema.

=== Hanami no maki ===
Nonkina Tōsan Hanami no Maki
- A book based on the manga (published by Tamura Shoten in 1925)
- Directed by: Ryoha Hatanaka
- Written by: Hirofumi Kaneko
- Starring: Gokuro Soganoya
- Cinematography: Taisaku Takashiro
- Production company: Rengo Eiga Geijutsuka Kyokai (United Film Artists Association)
- Distributed by: Rengo Eiga Geijutsuka Kyokai
- Release date: 18 September 1925
- Country: Japan
- Language: Japanese

Nonkina Tōsan Hanami no Maki (ノンキナトウサン 花見の巻; Carefree Dad's Cherry blossom viewing reel) is a Japanese feature film produced in 1925) and released on September 18 of the same year. Starring Gokurō Soganoya. Directed by Ryōha Hatanaka. It was produced and independently distributed by Sanjuzo Naoki (later Sanjugo Naoki)'s United Motion Picture Artists Association. It was released as a double feature with 'Nonkina Tōsan Activity Volume, mentioned below.

=== Katsudo no maki ===
Nonkina Tōsan Katsudo no maki
- Directed by: Yuji Ozawa
- Written by: Hirofumi Kaneko
- Starring: Gokuro Soganoya
- Cinematography: Taisaku Takashiro
- Production company: Rengo Eiga Geijutsuka Kyokai
- Distributed by: Rengo Eiga Geijutsuka Kyokai
- Release date: 18 September 1925
- Country: Japan
- Language: Japanese

Nonkina Tōsan Katsudo no maki (ノンキナトウサン 活動の巻 Carefree Dad's Activity Reel) is a Japanese feature-length film produced in 1925 and released on September 18 of the same year. Directed by Tokuji Ozawa. Starring Gokuro Soga. It was released as a double feature with the above-mentioned ``Nonkina Tōsan Hanami no Maki''.

=== Nonkina tōsan ===
Nonkina Tōsan
- Directed by: Masahiro Makino
- Written by: Fuji Yahiro
- Starring: Isamu Kosugi
- Cinematography: Haruo Takeno
- Edited by: Masahiro Makino
- Music by: Ryoichi Hattori
- Production company: Shochiku Kyoto Studio
- Distributed by: Shochiku
- Release date: 1 December 1946
- Running time: 90 minutes
- Country: Japan
- Language: Japanese

Nonkina tōsan (のんきな父さん) is a Japanese feature-length film produced and released in 1946., directed by Masahiro Makino, starring Isamu Kosugi. Produced by Shochiku Kyoto Studio.

At the end of Masahiro Makino's time as director of Shochiku Kyoto Studio, two projects were approved: this film and Kenji Mizoguchi's Utamaro and his Five Women. Makino cranked up this work in October, but at that time Mizoguchi had just begun preparations. At the time, the studio did not have a labor union, but that was because Makino was the director, and it was on the verge of organizing a union. After the production of this work, Makino headed to Shochiku headquarters with his resignation letter in hand, and when he returned after it was accepted, an employee union was formed and Makino was appointed as the chairman. He had no choice but to go on strike for a week and negotiated his demands with the head office. After the strike, Mizoguchi cranked up ``Utamaro'' in just one week, and completed each work. Both films were produced with Makino's personal loans. After they were completed, he previewed both films to his vice president, Shiro Kido, and had them purchased at a reasonable price. Employee demands through strikes were also accepted.

The film was shot with a baseball game scene featuring 25 professional baseball players, including Katsuhiko Haida's best friend Takehiko Bessho. Among the many singers who made special appearances in this film, Miss Wakana suddenly died of a heart attack on October 14 of the same year, shortly after filming.
