= Eroge =

Type of Japanese video game featuring erotica

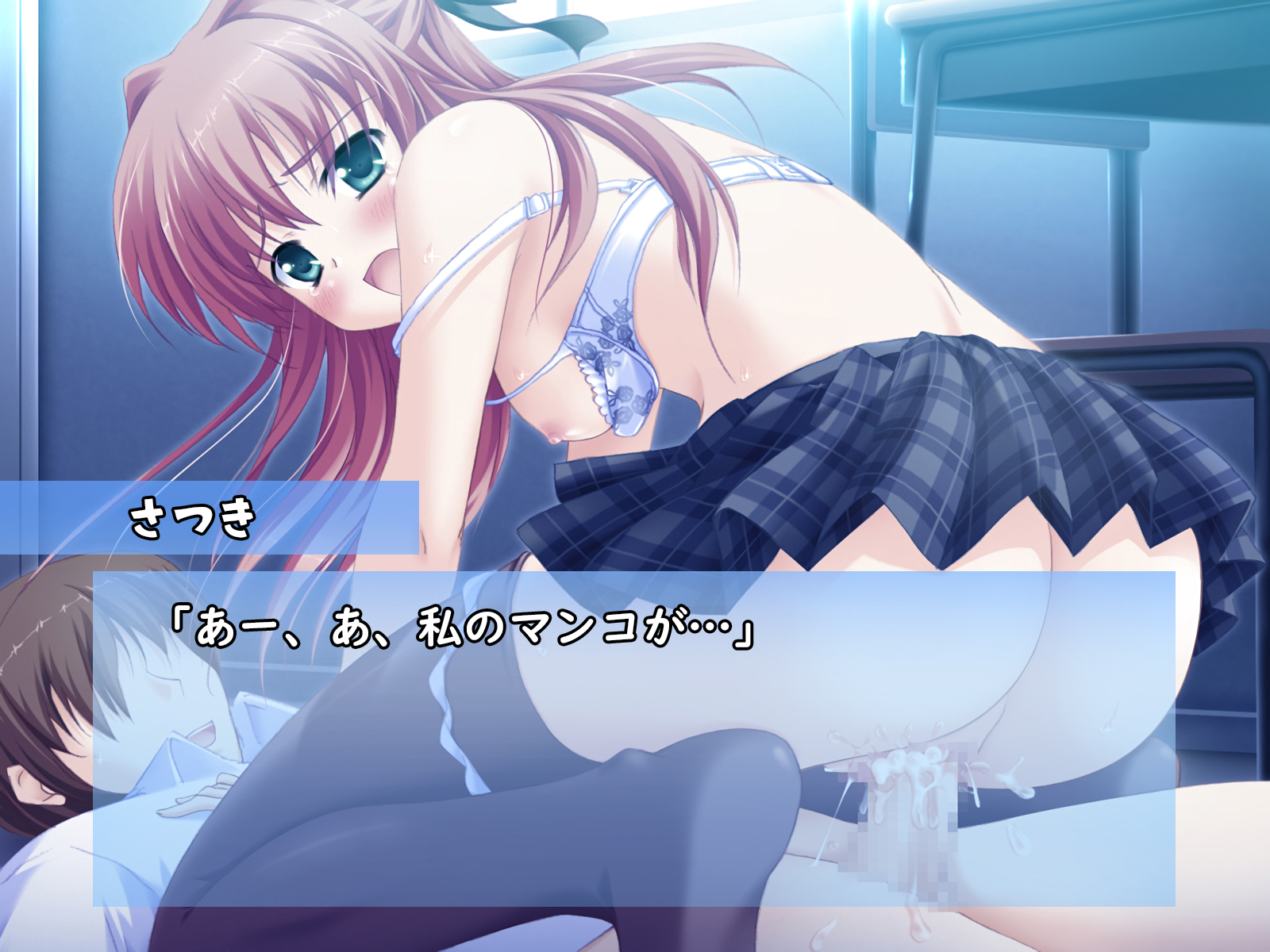
Eroge often feature anime and manga style graphics

An eroge (エロゲー, erogē, pronounced [eɾoɡe(ː)]), also called an H-game or ecchi game (エッチゲーム, etchi gēmu), is a Japanese genre of erotic video game. The term encompasses a wide variety of Japanese games containing erotic content across multiple genres. The first eroge were created in the 1980s, and many well-known companies in the Japanese gaming industry originally produced and distributed them. Some eroge are primarily focused on erotic content, while others, such as Key's Kanon, only contain occasional scenes in an otherwise non-erotic work. Games in the latter category are often re-released with sexual content removed for general audiences. Throughout its history, the genre has faced controversy for its use of explicit sexual content, and as a result has been banned from several console platforms.

== Etymology ==
Eroge is a portmanteau of "erotic game" (エロチックゲーム, erochikku gēmu). Such games are also referred to as an "H-game" (Hゲーム) and Japanese erotic games.

== History ==
Eroge is a Japanese erotic video game. The earliest known commercial erotic computer game is PSK's Lolita Yakyūken, released in 1982. That same year, Koei released the eroge title, Seduction of the Condominium Wife (団地妻の誘惑, Danchi Zuma no Yūwaku), which was an early role-playing adventure game with color graphics, owing to the eight-color palette of the PC-8001 computer. It became a hit, helping Koei become a major software company.

In another opinion, Yuji Horii recalled in 1986 that he saw a demonstration of a Yakyūken-like game running on the FM-8 in the end of 1981, and he considered Yakyūken was the origin of eroges. Some writers say that Yakyūken produced for Sharp MZ computers by Hudson Soft is the first Japanese eroge.

Other now-famous Japanese companies such as Enix, Square and Nihon Falcom also released erotic eroges for the PC-8801 computer in the early 1980s before they became mainstream. Early eroge usually had simple stories, some even involving anal sex, which often led to widespread condemnation from the Japanese media. In some of the early eroges, the erotic content is meaningfully integrated into thoughtful and mature storytelling, though others often used it as a flimsy excuse for pornography. eroges made the PC-8801 popular, but customers quickly became tired of paying over 8800 yen for such simple games. The success of ASCII's Chaos Angels, a role-playing eroge, led to the release of Dragon Knight by Elf and Rance by AliceSoft.

In the early 1990s eroge games became much more common. Most eroge games, a fairly large library, found its way on the PC-9801 platform. FM Towns also received many games, more so than the X68000 or MS-DOS, whilst the MSX platform (which had many eroge games in the 1980s) was nearing the end of its lifetime. Eroge was much less common on consoles – only NEC's PC Engine series had officially licensed eroges, and from the mid-90s, Sega's Saturn. Both Nintendo and Sony disallowed eroge video games on their consoles. Games also started to appear on Windows as it grew in popularity. There were also some titles on the arcades, such as the Gals Panic series.

In 1992, Elf released Dōkyūsei. In it, before any eroticism, the user has to first win the affection of one of a number of female characters, making the story into an interactive romance novel. Thus, the love simulation genre was invented. Soon afterwards, the video game Otogirisou on the Super Famicom attracted the attention of many Japanese gamers. Otogirisou was a standard adventure game but had multiple endings. This concept was called a "sound novel".

In 1996, the new software developer and publisher Leaf expanded on this idea, calling it a visual novel and releasing their first successful game, Shizuku, a horror story starring a rapist high school student, which released to initial obscurity, but later became popular with well received writing and music. Their next game, Kizuato, had a similar dark tone. However, in 1997, they released To Heart, a sentimental story of high school love that became one of the most famous and trendsetting eroge ever. To Heart's music proved popular enough that it was added to karaoke machines throughout Japan.

In response to increasing pressure from Japanese lobby groups, in mid-1996 Sega of Japan announced that they would no longer permit Sega Saturn games to include nudity.

After a similar game by Tactics, One: Kagayaku Kisetsu e, became a hit in 1998, Visual Arts scouted main creative staff of One to form a new brand under them, which became Key. In 1999, Key released Kanon. It contains only about seven brief erotic scenes in a sentimental story the size of a long novel (an all-ages version was also released afterward), but the enthusiasm of the response was unprecedented, and Kanon sold over 300,000 copies. In 2002 a 13-episode anime series was produced, as well as another 24-episode anime series in 2006. According to Satoshi Todome's A History of Eroge, Kanon is still the standard for modern eroge and is referred to as a "baptism" for young otaku in Japan. Although many eroge still market themselves primarily on sex, eroge that focus on story are now a major established part of Japanese otaku culture. Voice actors who have voiced for eroge have often been credited under a pseudonym.

As the visual novel standard was adopted, the erotic parts in eroge began to become less and less apparent. Many eroge become more story-oriented than sex-oriented, making story the main focus for many modern eroge. More and more people who used to reject such type of games began to become more open-minded, realizing that eroge are not just about sex anymore. A lot of story-focused eroge tend to have only a few erotic scenes.

Another subgenre is called "nukige" (抜きゲー, Nukigē), in which sexual gratification of the player is the main focus of the game.

== Gameplay ==
There is no set definition for the gameplay of eroge, except that they all include explicit erotic or sexual content depending on the game. Like other pornographic media in Japan, erotic scenes feature censorship of genitalia, only becoming uncensored if the game is licensed and released outside Japan, unless produced illegally by dōjin (usually with a construction kit like NScripter or RPG Maker). Additionally, some games may receive an "all-ages" version, such as a port to consoles or handheld devices where pornographic content is not allowed, which either censor or remove the sex scenes entirely.

Eroge is most often a visual novel or dating sim. However, there are also many other gameplay genres represented within eroge, such as role-playing games, mahjong games, or puzzle games. Some eroge, such as those made by Illusion Soft, are just simulations of sex, with no "conventional" gameplay included.

== See also ==
- Bishōjo game
- Hentai § Origin of erotic games
- List of eroge
- Sex and nudity in video games
- Visual novel
