= Kizuato =

1996 video game

- Developer: Leaf
- Publisher: Aquaplus
- Series: Leaf Visual Novel Series
- Platforms: NEC PC-9801, Microsoft Windows (95, 98, Me, 2000, XP, Vista)
- Release: NEC PC-9801; JP: July 26, 1996 Microsoft Windows 95; JP: July 26, 1996 Microsoft Windows 98/Me/2000/XP; JP: July 26, 2002 Microsoft Windows 2000/XP/Vista; JP: September 18, 2009
- Genres: Visual novel, eroge
- Mode: Single-player

Kizuato (痕～きずあと～; Scar) is a Japanese adult horror visual novel released on July 26, 1996, by Leaf for NEC PC-9801 and Microsoft Windows 95. An enhanced edition with new visuals, often called Kizuato Renewal (Note: Japanese: 痕 リニューアル, Hepburn: Kizuato Rinyūaru), was released on July 26, 2002, targeting Windows 98, Me, 2000, and XP. Another enhanced edition with yet new visuals and voice acting was released on September 18, 2009, this time targeting Windows 2000, XP, and Vista.

It is the second in Leaf's Visual Novel series, which took the style of Chunsoft's Sound Novel series, such as Kamaitachi no Yoru, and applied it to eroge, as with their previous work, Shizuku, which released earlier in the same year, helping to pioneer the term "visual novel".

== Story ==
Koichi Kashiwagi, a college student, goes to his cousins' for his father's funeral. After the ceremony, as he is on summer vacation, he stays with them. He experiences recurring nightmares and must hold down a strong homicidal impulse surfacing from deep within himself. One day Koichi dreams that he slaughters a person violently. The next day, the news reports the event of a violent homicide in the park where Koichi committed the murder in his dream.

== Characters ==
- Koichi Kashiwagi (柏木 耕一)
- Chizuru Kashiwagi (柏木 千鶴)

Chizuru is one of the 13 playable characters in Aquapazza: Aquaplus Dream Match, a fighting game developed by Aquaplus with characters from various Leaf games.

- Azusa Kashiwagi (柏木 梓)
- Kaede Kashiwagi (柏木 楓)
- Hatsune Kashiwagi (柏木 初音)
- Gensaburou Nagase (長瀬 源三郎)
- Yuya Yanagawa (柳川 裕也)
- Hiyoshi, Kaori (日吉 かおり)
- Kyoko Aida (相田 響子)
- Yumiko Koide (小出 由美子)

== Legacy ==
Kizuato is known for being historically notable and defining the visual novel genre. It has been described as similar to Shizuku, with themes of bloodshed, violence, and humiliation, with a "dark narrative". Some have argued that having character's hair spring up by antennae was popularized by the game, later becoming standard in games and anime. Kizuato was described as eroge but notable for combining the sound novels form with "erotic content". The visual novel was also mentioned by Konoha Akisato, the protagonist of 16bit Sensation: Another Layer, with the novel as an important part of setting the historical context for the anime's story.
