= Blue movie =

Blue movie or blue film may refer to:

== Film and video ==
- Pornographic film, when used as informal catch-all euphemistic term
- Softcore pornography, when used in a modern sense for a softcore film on network television in after-the-watershed hours
- Blue Movie, a 1969 film by Andy Warhol
- Blue Movie (1971 film), a film by Wim Verstappen
- Blue Movie, a 1989 pornographic mockumentary film directed by Jack Remy
- Blue Movie, a 1995 pornographic film starring Jenna Jameson
- Blue (1968 film), a Western film by Silvio Narizzano
- Blue (1993 film), a film by Derek Jarman
- Blue (2002 film), a Japanese film by Hiroshi Ando
- Blue (2009 film), an Indian film by Anthony D'Souza
- Kalyug (2005 film), an Indian film by Mohit Suri, working title Blue Film
- Blue Film (2025 film), an American drama film
- Blue Film: Estimation, a 1968 Japanese pink film

== Books ==
- Blue Movie (1970 book), a book of the 1969 Andy Warhol film
- Blue Movie (novel), 1970, by Terry Southern
- "The Blue Film", a 1954 short story by the English novelist Graham Greene

== Music ==
- Blue Film (album), by Lo-Fang
- "Blue Movie", a 2014 song by Lowtide from their eponymous debut album
- "Blue-film Movie", a 2002 song by Sneaker Pimps from Bloodsport
