= Shizuku (video game) =

1996 visual novel video game

- Cover art for Shizuku
- Developer: Leaf
- Publisher: Aquaplus
- Artist: Takashi Takenaka
- Writer: Tatsuya Takahashi
- Composer: Shinji Orito
- Series: Leaf Visual Novel Series
- Platforms: NEC PC-9801, Windows
- Release: NEC PC-9801; JP: January 26, 1996 Windows; JP: June 28, 1996
- Genre: Visual novel
- Mode: Single-player

Shizuku (Note: Japanese: 雫, Hepburn: lit. 'Drip') is an eroge visual novel by Leaf. The game has the player assume the role of Yusuke, a male student. One day in class, a female student approaches him and begins to hysterically laugh and shout obscenities before clawing at her own face which sends her to the hospital. Days later, Yusuke is still uncertain on what has come over the girl and investigates the school where he can meet up with students Saori, Mizuho or Ruriko to help him come closer to understanding what happened to the girl.

Leaf, a Japanese company that was established in 1994, originally made games for Japanese home computers such as the NEC PC-9801. Their early titles were often eroge (Japanese erotic games) and bishōjo games, which featured various anime-styled girls. As the staff were fans of Chunsoft's "Sound Novel" series such as Otogirisō (1992) and Kamaitachi no Yoru (1994). They opted to adapt gameplay style in which players read text and select choices in order to advance the narrative and combine the games visual style of text advancing across static images, but with characters fully on display. They dubbed it to be the first in their Leaf Visual Novel Series.

Shizuku was first released for NEC PC-9801 home computer and later ported to various Windows-based systems in Japan. At the time of its release, Shizuku only received brief and small mention in Japanese video game magazines, and received complimentary reviews in Game Criticism and Shampoo magazine. Shizuku slowly grew in popularity, when audiences for bishōjo games began discussing it more on online, leading to hype surrounding their next visual novel Kizuato (1996). Both these games coined the usage of the term "visual novel" as a common term for the genre, while Azuma Hiroki said that Shizuku changed the conceptual foundation of the bishōjo game to move beyond just players interacting with what was presented on the computer screen, to becoming "content-based" where players would engage with the game for its narrative content.

== Gameplay ==
Leaf's visual novels are a form of adventure game that has presents a player with illustrated backgrounds that fill the screen that are superimposed by character portraits and text overlaying all the graphics. The game is synchronized accompanied with sound effects and background music relating to the story. Like most visual novels, the story in the game progresses when the player clicks or presses a button to see the next part of story.

In addition to branching endings based on the player's choices, the number of choices in the narrative increases or decreases depending on the whether the game has completed the game and whether or not the player discovers different endings. The full scope of the story in Shizuku is only known when all the endings are reached.

== Plot ==
Academic Ko On Chan described Shizuku as having a "dark narrative" with the author of the story describing it as a hybrid of horror and science fiction. Academics writing for Games and Culture described it as being an eroge, as well as being influenced by denpa, a horror sub-genre dealing with themes of insanity.

Shizuku begins with the player in the role of Yusuke, a male student at a school who day dreams about the end of the world and indulging in his own fantasies. He is approached by Kanako Ota who will not stop laughing and then starts begging for sex. She starts scratching her own face with her nails and then is forced outside of the classroom. A few days past and Yusuke learns that up to that day she was acting normally with rumors spreading about her behavior. Yusuke grows more curious about the incident and is called into the staff by his uncle Genichiro Nagase. Nagase says he found out she was going out late at school with a strange man and sends Yusuke to investigate what she does at night.

Before going at night, Yusuke decides to investigate various class members and can choose between tagging along with Mizuho, a member of the student council and a close friend of Kanako Ota, Saori a member of the volleyball team who is said to know some information about went on at night. Other choices can lead to Yusuke meeting Ruriko, the sister of the council president Takuya. She is a mysterious girl who seems to know more about what is going on in the world beyond the case itself.

The choices follow similar paths that shed different light on the mystery and the relationships and backstories between the characters. Ultimately, it is revealed that Takuya can use radio waves to control peoples minds and forces student council members to become his sex slaves. Yusuke also learns that Ruriko has the power to interrupt Takuya's powers. Various endings have the player deal with Yusuke leading to some characters being helped, or to others dying and even wiping away the sexual assault characters had experienced from their mind. After completing various endings, further endings appear, including a humorous storyline where the three girls help Yusuke battle with various staff members of Leaf.

== Development ==
In October 1994, the video game development group that would become Leaf was established in the Kansai region of Japan as U-Office. The core members who launched Leaf were friends who met in high school such as Naoya Shimokawa and Shinji Orito. Prior to Shizuku, Leaf would make bishōjo games, which included a number of strip mahjong video games such as debut title DR^{2}Naito Suzume Oni (Note: DR^{2}ナイト雀鬼s; lit. 'DR^{2} Naito Suzume Oni') in February 1995. Shimokawa said the company made bishōjo games as consoles games were not within their budgets and PC eroge titles were what he described as in a blurry field where the difference between a mainstream game and doujin title was not obvious. During this time in development, Shimokawa said that the Leaf was struggling financially. Orito would leave Leaf after Shizuku, as he had a lot of insurance-related bills that he could not handle while working for Leaf.

In Shizuku, the story is presented over a static image and overlaid over the characters. A custom font was developed for the text Shizuku that had each member of the Leaf staff tasked to make a set amount of characters.

They developed a new style of game with Shizuku. The gameplay was inspired by Chunsoft's two games in their "sound novel" series for the Super Famicom: Otogirisō (1992) and Kamaitachi no Yoru (1994). These were adventure games with text over illustrated backgrounds that let a player make choices at key narrative moments. They decided to make the game a narrative-driven game. At the time, bishojo games selling points were its graphics, specifically the quality of the coloring and the large variety of graphic stills to display. They felt which such few members on staff, it was impossible to compete in this area. As Kamatchi no Yoru was a hit game, they tried to adapt its gameplay for the eroge market. Shizuku's story was predominantly developed by Tatsuya Takahashi, a former Taito employee who joined Leaf during the development of Legam. Takahashi said that he company as he was confident he could write something like Kamaitachi no Yoru. Takahashi said that among the guidelines he was given for the story from the company were that the story had to have a school setting with characters who wear school uniforms and the protagonist had to be male. The player also had to reach a "desired scene" within the first five minutes of play with little effort.

He said the themes of mental illness, psychic interference, and cults in the game was influenced by the novel Shinko shukyo omoide kyo (Note: 新興宗教オモイデ教, lit. 'The Omoide Cult, a New Religious Movement') (1992) by Kenji Ohtsuki. He added that the darker tone and themes about introspection were reflective of the era with popular works like The Silence of the Lambs (1991) and Neon Genesis Evangelion.

While Kamaitachi no Yoru featured characters in silhouettes during gameplay, Shizuku featured portraits of the characters to take advantage of its bishoujo game nature. The game's artist Takashi Takenaka was credited as Tooru Minazuki. Reflecting on the designs in the game, Takenaka said he was going through a transitional style in his art with Shizuku and was at a "trial-and-error" portion of this change. He said this led to some of the art looking a little strange. The game also features its own unique font that was not built-in for Windows or other operating systems and was made by each of the ten staff members dividing the task amongst themselves.

== Release and reception ==
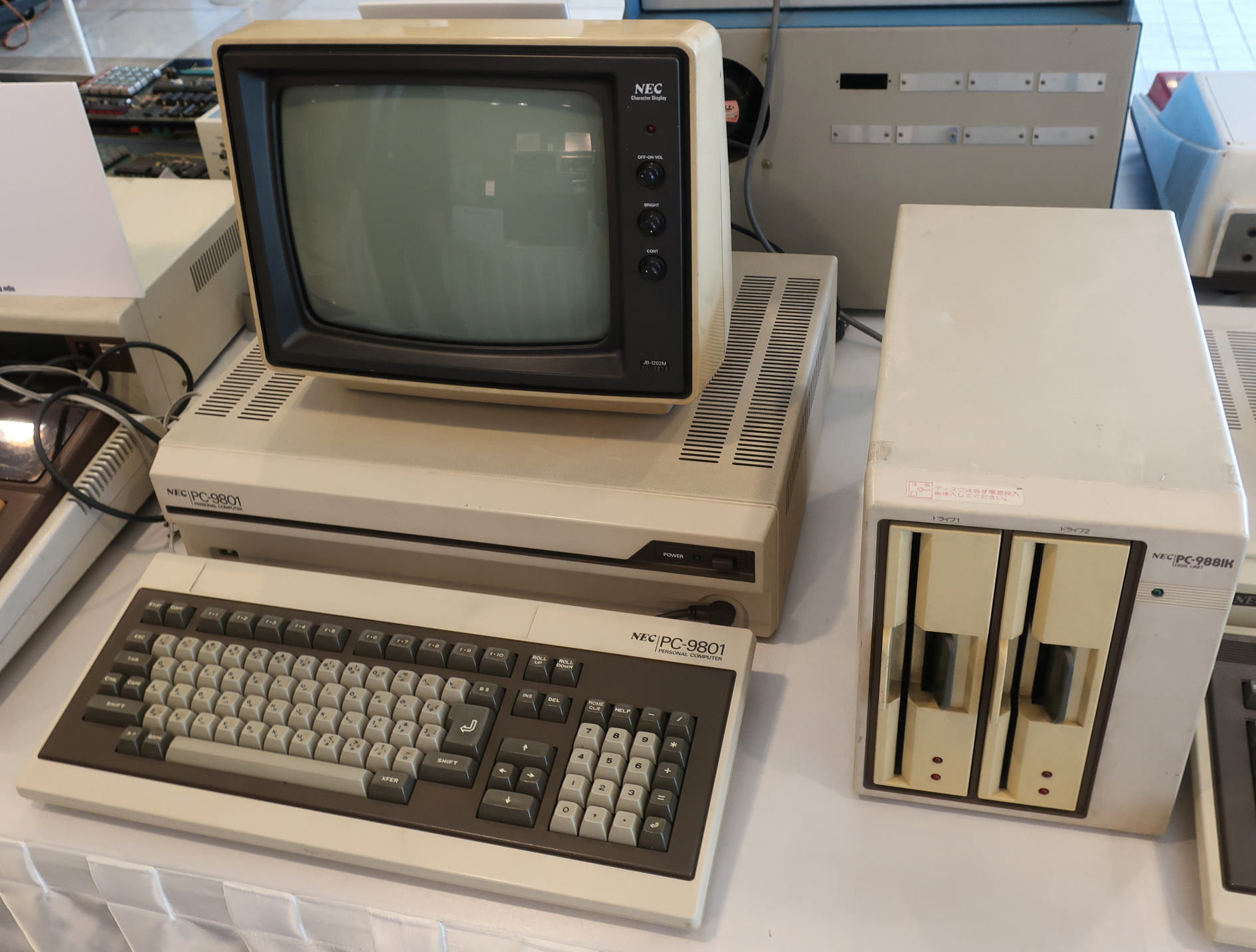
Shizuku was first released in 1996 for the NEC PC-9801. This was around the time the home computer was at the end of its life-cycle as a gaming platform.

Shizuku was released on January 26, 1996 for the NEC PC-9801 home computer line. By next year, NEC PC-9801 series was described by Ryo Morise of Famitsu as effectively ending as a gaming platform. The PC-9801 market for PC-9801 games rapidly shrunk after the launch of PlayStation and Sega Saturn consoles in 1994 with the market for PC games in Japan predominantly catering to online games and adult-themed titles. The PC-9801 version was discontinued on April 28, 1998.

Morise said that were only a few short articles covering Shizuku in Japanese magazines and that the game did not immediately attract a lot of attention. In 1996, information among the audiences of bishōjo games mainly took place online through bulletin board system (BBS) forums and in university game clubs. In the Japanese game magazine Shampoo, a reviewer referred to it as an ambitious but depressing title. They complimented the multiple endings that did not make its player feel like they were just hunting for them. Tohihisa Minami in Game Criticism magazine complimented Shizuku as finding a healthy balance between having the story unfold in various directions while maintaining a focus on its storyline. Minami found it themes to be particularly heavy themes, that became more difficult to experience as they were presented so directly. While they found the erotic scenes in the game necessary to explore the stories themes, they advised players looking for the game just for its erotic content to look elsewhere the game would "shake them up."

While Shizuku grew in popularity and sold more than Filsnown and DR^{2} Night Janki, Shimokawa said that at this time piracy of eroge was rampant which did not translate into sales. Takahashi said that Shizuku sold about 7,000 copies. The second visual novel game from Leaf, Kizuato, was released in July 1996. Morise wrote that the later simultaneous release of the games for Windows likely contributed to both of the games success due the growing number of Windows 95 and DOS/V users. This version for Windows was released on June 28, 1996 and is a direct port of the NEC PC-9801 version with the only difference being that the background music is played in Compact Disc Digital Audio (CD-DA) format. This Windows version was discontinued by February 6, 2004. A version compatible with 98, Me, 2000 and XP version of Windows titled Shizuku Renewal (Note: 雫 リニューアル, Shizuka Rinyūaru) was released in Japan on January 23, 2004.

Leaf's early visual novel titles were not commercially released outside of Japan. An English-language fan translation of Shizuku was released on January 26, 2026.

== Legacy ==
Shizuku was the first installment in a series that became to be known as the Leaf Visual Novel Series (LVNS). The company had planned to make sequels using the same gameplay system, which led to Takahashi and Mikasuki if the game was presented as being part of a series. As Chunsoft had their Sound Novel series, Shizuku was promoted the series as visual novel series. Morise said it was Leaf's second entry in the series, Kizuato (1996) that had the company to "truly explode" in popularity. He said this was likely contributed to its success due the growing number of Windows 95 and DOS/V users. Takashi would serve as the predominate writer for the next two titles in the series: Kizuato and To Heart (1997). The darker themes of Shizuku continued in Kizuato while To Heart is much more light-hearted title. The fourth and so far final game in the LVNS was Routes released in February 2003. By 2023, Takahashi would work as a freelance writer, mostly writing for anime series, such as 16bit Sensation: Another Layer (2023) which makes reference to Shizuku. Reflecting on the game, Takahashi said it looked amateur and was ultimately embarrassing, which he owed to the parts that Minazuki and himself made.

Both Shizuku and Kizuato were promoted as "visual novels", a term coined by Leaf. The following year, the term "visual novel" was used in the project proposal by Tactics for their software titled Moon (1997). Video game journalist Koji Fukuyama said that while he lacked empirical data, he believed that these titles by Leaf, Tactics and later Key popularized the term for the visual novel genre.

Azuma Hiroki said that Shizuku changed the conceptual foundation of the bishōjo game. He said that this games were previously just about a user interacting with the computer, became "content-based" where players would engage with the game for its narrative content. He continued that it led bishōjo games to eventually being known for spending hours passively reading scenarios with brief interactions that occurred seldomly.
