= National Film Archive of Japan =

Japanese film archive

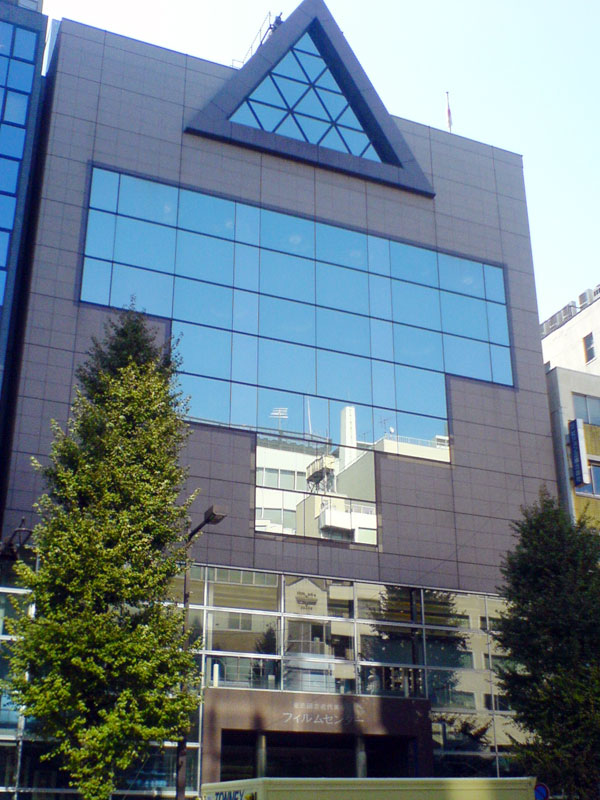
The NFAJ in Kyōbashi

The National Film Archive of Japan (国立映画アーカイブ, Kokuritsu Eiga Ākaibu) is an independent administrative institution and one of Japan's seven national museums of art which specializes in preserving and exhibiting the film heritage of Japan. In its previous incarnation, it was the National Film Center, which was part of the National Museum of Modern Art, Tokyo. In April 2018, it became independent of the National Museum of Modern Art and was officially elevated to the rank of a national museum.

The NFAJ is located in Kyōbashi, Tokyo and is Japan's only public institution devoted to cinema, holding about 40,000 films and numerous other materials in its collection. The Archive has film-related materials on permanent display and it holds special screenings in its theaters. The NFAJ is a member of The International Federation of Film Archives. It preserves many important works of Japanese and world film history including films designated as Important Cultural Properties of Japan like Momijigari.

== Collection ==
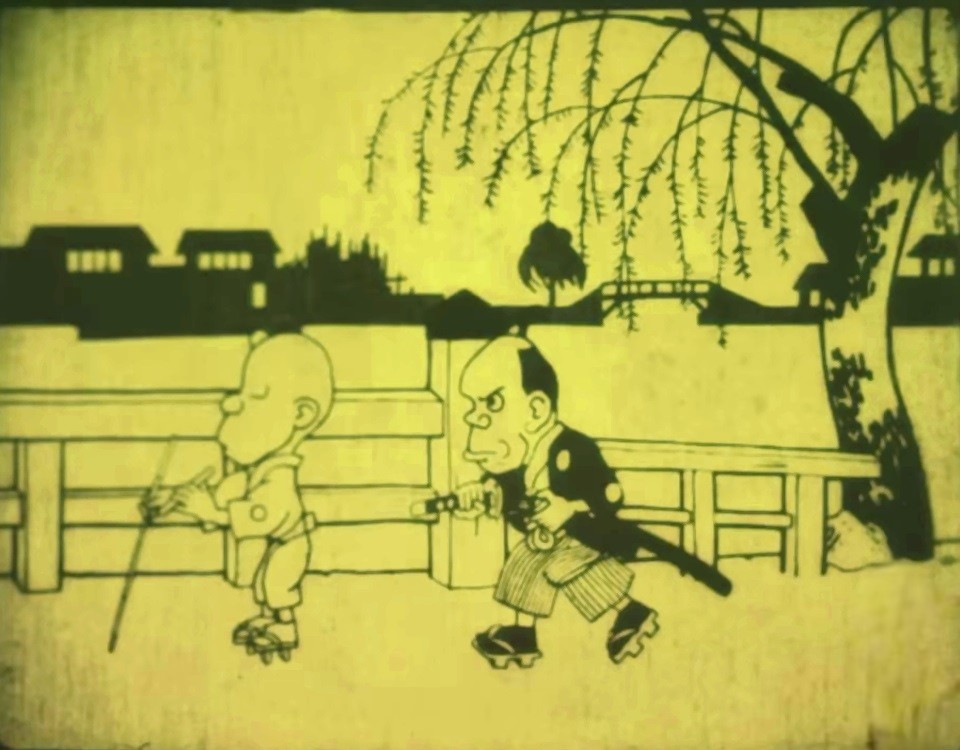
Screenshot from the oldest existing example of a Japanese animated film originally made for the cinema, Namakura-gatana (1917). This unique 2-minute film was restored and initially screened for the public in 2008.

The NFAJ restored a Japanese animated film which had been first released in 1917, the oldest existing example of a Japanese animated film originally made for the cinema. The film, The Dull Sword (Namakura-gatana), is the first work of Jun'ichi Kōuchi, one of the founders of Japanese animated film. A rare surviving print was unexpectedly discovered in an antique market in Osaka. In the silent comedy, the animation tells the story of a samurai warrior who is tricked into buying a dull-edged sword. He tries to attack passers-by in an effort to test the sword's quality but lower-class townspeople fight back and knock him down. The animated story lasts just two minutes. Although the ultimate status of the film remains uncertain, it was screened by NFC for the public in late April 2008. With the involvement of the NFAJ the animated film became something more than an historical artifact—it also became an illustration of the progress film restoration has made over recent decades.

The National Film Archive collection includes original movie scripts (such as Akira Kurosawa's Rashomon, Yasujirō Ozu's Tokyo Story and Kenji Mizoguchi's Osaka Elegy), original movie posters (Godzilla, Rashomon, Tokyo Story, The Life of Oharu, etc.), photos shot on set, movie cameras and actors and actresses' personal effects (such as Kinuyo Tanaka's).

== Location ==
The NFAJ's Tokyo headquarters in the Kyōbashi building is a one-minute walk from Kyōbashi Station (Station G-10) on the Tokyo Metro Ginza Line. It is also a one-minute walk from Takarachō Station (Station A-12) on the Toei Asakusa Line. An NFAJ branch is located in the city of Sagamihara in neighboring Kanagawa Prefecture.
