= List of Key video games =

Promotional image of Key 10th Memorial Box with the various Key visual novel covers from 1999 to 2009.

Key is a Japanese visual novel video game development studio and brand under the publisher Visual Arts. The video games developed by Key are initially published by Visual Arts and released for Windows; consumer ports are published by Interchannel and Prototype. Key released their debut title, Kanon, in 1999, followed by their second title, Air, in 2000. Both Kanon and Air were initially released as adult games, but Key released their third game, Clannad, in 2004 with a rating of approval for all ages. Key's fourth game, Planetarian: The Reverie of a Little Planet, was also released in 2004 with a rating for all ages, and is described as a "kinetic novel" by the development team because of its completely linear storyline.

Key's fifth game, Tomoyo After: It's a Wonderful Life, was released in 2005 as an adult game and spin-off from Clannad; it expanded on the scenario of the heroine Tomoyo Sakagami. Key released their sixth visual novel, Little Busters!, in 2007 with a rating for all ages. Key's seventh title, Little Busters! Ecstasy, was an expanded, adult version of Little Busters! released in 2008. Key's eighth game, Kud Wafter, was released in 2010 as an adult game and spin-off from Little Busters! Ecstasy; it expanded on the scenario of the heroine Kudryavka Noumi. Key released their ninth game Rewrite in 2011 with a rating for all ages. Key released a fan disc of Rewrite titled Rewrite Harvest festa! in 2012.

Key's 11th game Angel Beats! 1st Beat was released in 2015. Key released the kinetic novel Harmonia in 2016. Key's 13th game Summer Pockets was released in 2018, and an expanded version titled Summer Pockets Reflection Blue was released in 2020. Three kinetic novels were released in 2021: Loopers, Planetarian: Snow Globe and Lunaria: Virtualized Moonchild. Another kinetic novel, Stella of The End, followed in 2022. A four-volume kinetic novel series for the Prima Doll multimedia project will be released between 2023 and 2024.

As of September 2022, 62 versions of Key's 18 released visual novels have been published by VisualArt's. Of the 62, 11 were released with an adult rating, and the remaining 51 had a rating for all ages. VisualArt's has ceased manufacturing 40 versions of Key's 18 games. Key released a box set called "Key 10th Memorial Box" in July 2009 containing six of Key's visual novels with a rating for all ages. The availability of Key 10th Memorial Box was restricted to ordering online. Key released "memorial editions" of their first five games in April and May 2010 with ratings for all ages.

== Visual novel list ==
=== Windows ===
Visual novel release history
Title	Version	Release date	Rating	Status	WW (Note: These games have been released in English to a worldwide market.)
Kanon	Kanon (limited edition) (Note: Kanon Shokai-ban (Kanon 初回版))	June 4, 1999	Adult	Discontinued	
Kanon	Kanon (regular edition) (Note: Kanon Tsūjō-ban (Kanon 通常版))	June 4, 1999	Adult	Discontinued	
Kanon	Kanon (all ages edition) (Note: Kanon Zennenrei Taishō-ban (Kanon 全年齢対象版))	January 7, 2000	All ages	Discontinued	
Kanon	Kanon Standard Edition	November 26, 2004	Adult	Discontinued	
Kanon	Kanon Standard Edition	January 28, 2005	All ages	Discontinued	
Kanon	Kanon (Note: These six versions were released in the box set Key 10th Memorial Box.)	July 31, 2009	All ages	Discontinued	
Kanon	Kanon (all ages memorial edition) (Note: Kanon Memoriaru Edishon Zennenrei Taishō-ban (Kanon メモリアルエディション全年齢対象版))	April 30, 2010	All ages	Discontinued	
Air	Air (limited edition) (Note: Air Shokai Gentei-ban (Air 初回限定版))	September 8, 2000	Adult	Discontinued	
Air	Air (regular edition) (Note: Air Tsūjō-ban (Air 通常版))	July 27, 2001	Adult	Discontinued	
Air	Air (all ages edition) (Note: Air Zennenrei Taishō-ban (Air 全年齢対象版))	July 27, 2001	All ages	Discontinued	
Air	Air Standard Edition	April 8, 2005	Adult	Discontinued	
Air	Air	July 31, 2009	All ages	Discontinued	
Air	Air (all ages memorial edition) (Note: Air Memoriaru Edishon Zennenrei Taishō-ban (Air メモリアルエディション全年齢対象版))	May 28, 2010	All ages	Discontinued	
Clannad	Clannad (limited edition) (Note: Clannad Shokai Gentei-ban (Clannad 初回限定版))	April 28, 2004	All ages	Discontinued	
Clannad	Clannad (regular edition) (Note: Clannad Tsūjō-ban (Clannad 通常版))	August 6, 2004	All ages	Discontinued	
Clannad	Clannad Full Voice	February 29, 2008	All ages	Discontinued	
Clannad	Clannad	July 31, 2009	All ages	Discontinued	
Clannad	Clannad (all ages memorial edition) (Note: Clannad Memoriaru Edishon Zennenrei Taishō-ban (Clannad メモリアルエディション全年齢対象版))	May 28, 2010	All ages	Discontinued	Yes
Planetarian: The Reverie of a Little Planet	Planetarian: The Reverie of a Little Planet (Kinetic Novel edition) (Note: Planetarian ~Chiisana Hoshi no Yume~ Kinetic Novel-ban (planetarian ～ちいさなほしのゆめ～ Kinetic Novel版))	November 29, 2004	All ages	Discontinued	
Planetarian: The Reverie of a Little Planet	Planetarian: The Reverie of a Little Planet (package limited edition) (Note: Planetarian ~Chiisana Hoshi no Yume~ Pakkēji-ban Shokai-ban (planetarian ～ちいさなほしのゆめ～ パッケージ版 初回版))	April 28, 2006	All ages	Discontinued	
Planetarian: The Reverie of a Little Planet	Planetarian: The Reverie of a Little Planet (package regular edition) (Note: Planetarian ~Chiisana Hoshi no Yume~ Pakkēji-ban Tsūjō-ban (planetarian ～ちいさなほしのゆめ～ パッケージ版 通常版))	April 28, 2006	All ages	Discontinued	
Planetarian: The Reverie of a Little Planet	Planetarian: The Reverie of a Little Planet (Note: Planetarian ~Chiisana Hoshi no Yume~ (planetarian ～ちいさなほしのゆめ～))	July 31, 2009	All ages	Discontinued	
Planetarian: The Reverie of a Little Planet	Planetarian: The Reverie of a Little Planet (all ages memorial edition) (Note: Planetarian ~Chiisana Hoshi no Yume~ Memoriaru Edishon Zennenrei Taishōban (planetarian ～ちいさなほしのゆめ～ メモリアルエディション全年齢対象版))	April 30, 2010	All ages	Discontinued	Yes
Planetarian: The Reverie of a Little Planet	Planetarian: The Reverie of a Little Planet (English edition) (Note: Planetarian ~Chiisana Hoshi no Yume~ －English edition－ (planetarian ～ちいさなほしのゆめ～ －English edition－))	March 28, 2015	All ages	Discontinued	
Planetarian: The Reverie of a Little Planet	Planetarian: The Reverie of a Little Planet (HD edition) (Note: Planetarian ~Chiisana Hoshi no Yume~ HD edition (planetarian ～ちいさなほしのゆめ～ HD edition))	July 29, 2016	All ages	Available	Yes
Planetarian: The Reverie of a Little Planet	Planetarian Ultimate Edition	September 3, 2021	All ages	Available	
Tomoyo After: It's a Wonderful Life	Tomoyo After: It's a Wonderful Life (limited edition) (Note: Tomoyo Afutā Shokai Gentei-ban (智代アフター ～It's a Wonderful Life～ 初回限定版))	November 25, 2005	Adult	Discontinued	
Tomoyo After: It's a Wonderful Life	Tomoyo After: It's a Wonderful Life (Note: Tomoyo Afutā ~It's a Wonderful Life~ (智代アフター ～It's a Wonderful Life～))	July 31, 2009	All ages	Discontinued	
Tomoyo After: It's a Wonderful Life	Tomoyo After: It's a Wonderful Life (all ages memorial edition) (Note: Tomoyo Afutā ~It's a Wonderful Life~ Memoriaru Edishon Zennenrei Taishō-ban (智代アフター ～It's a Wonderful Life～ メモリアルエディション全年齢対象版))	April 30, 2010	All ages	Discontinued	Yes
Tomoyo After: It's a Wonderful Life	Tomoyo After: It's a Wonderful Life Perfect Edition (Note: Tomoyo Afutā ~It's a Wonderful Life~ Perfect Edition (智代アフター ～It's a Wonderful Life～ Perfect Edition))	September 26, 2014	Adult	Available	
Little Busters!	Little Busters! (limited edition) (Note: Ritoru Basutāzu! Shokai Gentei-ban (リトルバスターズ! 初回限定版))	July 27, 2007	All ages	Discontinued	
Little Busters!	Little Busters! (regular edition) (Note: Ritoru Basutāzu! Tsūjō-ban (リトルバスターズ! 通常版))	September 28, 2007	All ages	Discontinued	
Little Busters! Ecstasy	Little Busters! Ecstasy (limited edition) (Note: Ritoru Basutāzu! Ekusutashī Shokai Gentei-ban (リトルバスターズ! エクスタシー 初回限定版))	July 25, 2008	Adult	Discontinued	
Little Busters! Ecstasy	Little Busters! Ecstasy (regular edition) (Note: Ritoru Basutāzu! Ekusutashī Tsūjō-ban (リトルバスターズ! エクスタシー 通常版))	September 26, 2008	Adult	Available	
Little Busters! Ecstasy	Little Busters! Ecstasy (Note: Ritoru Basutāzu! Ekusutashī (リトルバスターズ! エクスタシー))	July 31, 2009	All ages	Discontinued	
Little Busters! Ecstasy	Little Busters! Perfect Edition (Note: Ritoru Basutāzu! Pāfekuto Edishon (リトルバスターズ！パーフェクトエディション))	November 30, 2012	All ages	Discontinued	Yes
Kud Wafter	Kud Wafter (Note: Kudo Wafutā (クドわふたー))	June 25, 2010	Adult	Available	
Kud Wafter	Kud Wafter (all ages edition) (Note: Kudo Wafutā Zennenrei Taishō-ban (クドわふたー 全年齢対象版))	June 28, 2013	All ages	Discontinued	
Rewrite	Rewrite (limited edition) (Note: Rewrite Shokai Gentei-ban (Rewrite 初回限定版))	June 24, 2011	All ages	Discontinued	
Rewrite	Rewrite (regular edition) (Note: Rewrite Tsūjō-ban (Rewrite 通常版))	September 30, 2011	All ages	Discontinued	
Rewrite	Rewrite+	July 29, 2016	All ages	Available	Yes
Rewrite Harvest festa!	Rewrite Harvest festa!	July 27, 2012	15+	Available (Note: As of 2016, this game is only available bundled with Rewrite+.)	To be released
Angel Beats! 1st Beat	Angel Beats! 1st Beat	June 26, 2015	All ages	Available	
Harmonia	Harmonia (English edition)	September 23, 2016	All ages	Available	Yes
Harmonia	Harmonia (Japanese edition) (Note: Harmonia Nihongo-ban (Harmonia日本語版))	December 29, 2016	All ages	Available	
Harmonia	Harmonia (limited edition) (Note: Harmonia Shokai Gentei-ban (Harmonia 初回限定版))	May 26, 2017	All ages	Discontinued	
Harmonia	Harmonia (regular edition) (Note: Harmonia Tsūjō-ban (Harmonia 通常版))	April 26, 2019	All ages	Available	
Summer Pockets	Summer Pockets (limited edition) (Note: Summer Pockets Shokai Gentei-ban (Summer Pockets 初回限定版))	June 29, 2018	All ages	Discontinued	
Summer Pockets	Summer Pockets (regular edition) (Note: Summer Pockets Tsūjō-ban (Summer Pockets 通常版))	July 26, 2019	All ages	Discontinued	Yes
Summer Pockets Reflection Blue	Summer Pockets Reflection Blue (limited edition) (Note: Summer Pockets Reflection Blue Shokai Gentei-ban (Summer Pockets Reflection Blue 初回限定版))	June 26, 2020	All ages	Available	
Summer Pockets Reflection Blue	Summer Pockets Reflection Blue (special edition) (Note: Summer Pockets Reflection Blue Gōka Gentei-ban (Summer Pockets Reflection Blue 豪華限定版))	June 26, 2020	All ages	Discontinued	
Loopers	Loopers (download edition)	May 28, 2021	All ages	Available	Yes
Loopers	Loopers (limited edition) (Note: Loopers Shokai Gentei-ban (Loopers 初回限定版))	May 28, 2021	All ages	Available	
Loopers	Loopers (special edition) (Note: Loopers Gōka Gentei-ban (Loopers 豪華限定版))	May 28, 2021	All ages	Discontinued	
Planetarian: Snow Globe	Planetarian: Snow Globe (download edition)	September 3, 2021	All ages	Available	
Planetarian: Snow Globe	Planetarian: Snow Globe (package edition) (Note: This version was released as part of the Planetarian Ultimate Edition.)	September 3, 2021	All ages	Available	
Lunaria: Virtualized Moonchild	Lunaria: Virtualized Moonchild (download edition)	December 24, 2021	All ages	Available	
Lunaria: Virtualized Moonchild	Lunaria: Virtualized Moonchild (limited edition) (Note: Lunaria: Virtualized Moonchild Shokai Gentei-ban (LUNARiA -Virtualized Moonchild- 初回限定版))	December 24, 2021	All ages	Available	
Lunaria: Virtualized Moonchild	Lunaria: Virtualized Moonchild (special edition) (Note: Lunaria: Virtualized Moonchild Gōka Gentei-ban (LUNARiA -Virtualized Moonchild- 豪華限定版))	December 24, 2021	All ages	Available	
Stella of The End	Stella of The End (download edition)	September 30, 2022	All ages	Available	Yes
Stella of The End	Stella of The End (limited edition) (Note: Tsui no Sutera Shokai Gentei-ban (終のステラ 初回限定版))	September 30, 2022	All ages	Available	
Stella of The End	Stella of The End (special edition) (Note: Tsui no Sutera Gōka Gentei-ban (終のステラ 豪華限定版))	September 30, 2022	All ages	Available	
Prima Doll	Prima Doll: Fuyuzora Hanabi / Sekka Monyō (Note: Purima Dōru: Fuyuzora Hanabi / Sekka Monyō (プリマドール：冬空花火／雪華文様))	April 28, 2023	All ages	Available	
Prima Doll	Prima Doll: Mumei Tenrei (Note: Purima Dōru: Mumei Tenrei (プリマドール：無名典礼))	May 31, 2024	All ages	Available	
Prima Doll	Prima Doll: Kōto Tantei (Note: Purima Dōru: Kōto Tantei (プリマドール：皇都探偵))	TBA	All ages	To be released	
Prima Doll	Prima Doll Encore (Note: Purima Dōru Ankōru (プリマドール・アンコール))	TBA	All ages	To be released	

=== Consumer ports ===
Consumer ports release history
Title	First release date	Publisher(s)	CERO rating(s)	Android	DC	FOMA	iOS	PS2	PS3	PS4	PSP	PSV	S3G	Switch	XB360
Kanon	September 14, 2000 (DC)	NEC Interchannel; Prototype	B	Yes	Yes	Yes	Yes	Yes			Yes		Yes	Yes	
Air	September 20, 2001 (DC)	NEC Interchannel; Prototype	B (DC, PS2); C (PSP, PSV, Switch)	Yes	Yes	Yes	Yes	Yes			Yes	Yes	Yes	Yes	
Clannad	February 23, 2006 (PS2)	Interchannel; Prototype	C	Yes		Yes		Yes	Yes	Yes	Yes	Yes	Yes	Yes	Yes
Planetarian: The Reverie of a Little Planet	August 24, 2006 (PS2)	Prototype; Visual Arts	A	Yes		Yes	Yes	Yes			Yes		Yes	Yes	
Tomoyo After: It's a Wonderful Life CS Edition	January 25, 2007 (PS2)	Prototype; Visual Arts	B	Yes		Yes		Yes	Yes		Yes			Yes	Yes
Little Busters! Converted Edition	December 24, 2009 (PS2)	Prototype; Visual Arts	B					Yes	Yes		Yes	Yes		Yes	
Kud Wafter Converted Edition	January 31, 2013 (Android)	Prototype; Visual Arts	C	Yes							Yes	Yes		Yes	
Rewrite	April 17, 2014 (PSP)	Prototype; Visual Arts	C						Yes	Yes	Yes	Yes			
Rewrite Harvest festa!	May 18, 2017 (PSV)	Prototype; Visual Arts	D									Yes			
Summer Pockets	December 17, 2018 (iOS)	Prototype; Visual Arts	C	Yes			Yes							Yes	
Summer Pockets Reflection Blue	August 20, 2020 (Android)	Prototype; Visual Arts	C	Yes			Yes			Yes				Yes	
Loopers	July 20, 2021 (Android, iOS)	Prototype; Visual Arts	B	Yes			Yes			Yes				Yes	
Heaven Burns Red	February 10, 2022 (Android, iOS)	Wright Flyer Studios		Yes			Yes								
Lunaria: Virtualized Moonchild	February 24, 2022 (Android, iOS)	Visual Arts		Yes			Yes							Yes	
Harmonia	October 20, 2022 (Switch)	Prototype	B											Yes	
Stella of The End	April 21, 2023 (Android, iOS)	Visual Arts		Yes			Yes								
