= 5 (video game) =

2008 video game

- Developer: Ram
- Publisher: Visual Art's
- Platform: Windows
- Release: JP: July 25, 2008
- Genres: Eroge, visual novel
- Mode: Single-player

5 (5 -ファイブ-, 5 -Faibu-) is a Japanese adult visual novel developed by Ram and released on July 25, 2008, for Windows. 5 is Ram's third game. The developers described 5 as a "dramatic adventure", and a "noisy northern province love comedy" (ドタバタ 北国ラブコメディ, dotabata hokkoku rabu komedi). The game's tagline is, "Five little love tales which are likely to be buried in snow." 5 has typical visual novel gameplay.

== Gameplay ==
A conversation in 5 depicting the main character talking to Airi.

5' has five main plot lines for the player to experience, each following one of the five heroines. To view all five plot lines, the player will have to replay the game multiple times and make different decisions. Different endings allow the player to see different h-scenes involving the protagonist, Takahiro, and one of the five heroines.

== Plot and characters ==
The story of 5 revolves around Takahiro Inaba (稲葉 孝弘, Inaba Takahiro), who makes a trip to Hokkaidō, Japan with his younger sister Airi Inaba (稲葉 愛理, Inaba Airi; Voiced by: Mayumi Shindō) in the winter. The two find their way to Kaede Okina (奥菜 楓, Okina Kaede; Voiced by: Reona Sakura), a friend of their father's, only to realize that their visit is not expected as their father only contacted her regarding their visit that morning of their arrival. Despite this, Kaede welcomes them to stay at her farm, where the main portion of the game's story takes place, and provides them with food and shelter. After two days at the farm, Takahiro rides Kaede's motorcycle to the town's shopping district and comes upon a lively, but clumsy girl named Honoka Orito (織戸 ほのか, Orito Honoka; Voiced by: Chihiro Kanzaki), who collided with Takahiro and injured her leg after running downhill. Due to this, Takahiro decides to take her home where he meets her older sister Nene Orito (織戸 禰音, Orito Nene; Voiced by: Himiko Moto). Nene, unlike Honoka, is more reliable, intelligent, and takes care of the general domestic household chores.

== Development ==
Originally titled Calling (コーリング, Kōringu), 5 is the third and last project developed by the visual novel studio Ram, and took about eight years to develop. Much of the staff for 5 did not work on Ram's previous two titles Negai and Koigokoro. Art direction and character design was headed by the artist Bang!, which was the artist's first work on a visual novel. Background art is headed by Torino. For work on the scenario, the author Kai returns as the only scenario writer for 5 that also worked on Ram's previous two titles. Hiroshi Yamaji and Kanrinin also worked on the scenario, despite the two having not been on the staff for many visual novels. The music in the game was composed primarily by Jun Maeda of Key, and VWN who also worked on the music for Negai and Koigokoro. Maeda stated that he composed about twenty background music tracks used in the game, and this was the first time he worked as the main composer on a game project. Both Kai and Torino have worked with Maeda in the past on previous Key titles.

=== Release history ===
On May 15, 2008, a free game demo of 5 became available for download at Ram's official website. In the demo, the player is introduced to the main characters in the game through a lengthy sequence that is typical of the gameplay found in a visual novel which includes times during gameplay where the player is given several choices to make in order to further the plot in a specific direction. It was followed by a second demo, released online on July 11, 2008, with edited scenario, and full voice acting with the exception of Takahiro. The full game was first released on July 25, 2008, after an eight-year hiatus since the original release of their previous game Koigokoro, as a DVD playable only on a Microsoft Windows PC.

== Music ==
The visual novel has two main theme songs, the opening theme "Kaze no Kotowari" (風の理, The Wind's Reason), and the ending theme "Eien" (永遠, Eternity), both sung by Haruka Shimotsuki. Both songs were written and composed by Jun Maeda of Key. Arrangement was handled by two artists, Takumaru for the opening theme, and Magome Togoshi for the ending theme, both of which have previously worked with Maeda on albums released by Key under their record label Key Sounds Label. A maxi single titled "Kaze no Kotowari" containing the two songs was included with the game as a pre-order extra. The game's original soundtrack entitled Yukar was released in a three CD set on July 24, 2009.

== Reception and sales ==
Based on the sales on Getchu.com, 5 made its only appearance on its sales ranking at the nineteenth place out of thirty when it was first released in July 2008. According to a national ranking of bishōjo games based on sales in Japan, the limited edition of 5 premiered at eighteenth place out of fifty.
