= Loopers =

2021 Japanese visual novel video game

- Cover featuring Mia with Tyler (top left), Leona and Simon (top right), and Hilda (bottom right)
- Developer: Key
- Publishers: Visual Arts (Windows); Prototype (Switch, PS4)
- Director: Kazuma Takada
- Producer: Tōya Okano
- Artist: Kei Mochizuki
- Writer: Ryukishi07
- Composers: Shinji Orito; Sōshi Hosoi; Donmaru; Hisashi Tenkyū; Shōyu; Sumi
- Platforms: Microsoft Windows, Android, iOS, Nintendo Switch, PlayStation 4
- Release: May 28, 2021: Windows; JP: May 28, 2021; WW: June 27, 2023 Android, iOS; JP: July 20, 2021 Nintendo Switch; WW: June 2, 2022 PlayStation 4; WW: February 15, 2023
- Genre: Visual novel
- Mode: Single-player

Loopers (stylized as L∞PERS) is a Japanese science fiction horror visual novel developed by Key, a brand of Visual Arts. It was released on May 28, 2021, for Windows and is Key's 15th game overall. An English version was released on Steam in June 2023. It was ported to iOS and Android devices, as well as the Nintendo Switch and PlayStation 4. The story follows high school student Tyler and his friends who get caught in a time loop, continuously repeating the same day seemingly without end. Before long, they meet others caught in the same predicament who call themselves "loopers", and the two groups join forces to try to break out of the loop.

Loopers is the third of Key's "kinetic novels"—after Planetarian: The Reverie of a Little Planet (2004) and Harmonia (2016)—since its gameplay offers no choices or alternate endings. Instead, the player proceeds through the story solely by reading. The story was written by Ryukishi07 of 07th Expansion, and character design was produced by Kei Mochizuki. The game's soundtrack was composed by Shinji Orito, Sōshi Hosoi, Donmaru, Hisashi Tenkyū, Shōyu and Sumi.

== Development and release ==
Following Key's previous success with the production of two prior visual novels termed "kinetic novels"—Planetarian: The Reverie of a Little Planet (2004) and Harmonia (2016)—since their gameplay offers no choices or alternate endings, Loopers was one of three kinetic novels announced in October 2020 alongside Lunaria: Virtualized Moonchild (2021) and Stella of The End (2022). Planning for the project began with video game director Kazuma Takada and producer Tōya Okano, the latter of whom has been credited on the staff of Key's visual novels since providing scenario assistance with Air (2000). The game's motif was built around the concept of treasure hunting, specifically geocaching. During a production meeting, Okano suggested the idea of a geochache containing a human finger, adding an element of horror to the story. In keeping with Key's main theme of making the end user cry, the concept for Loopers was solidified around "treasure hunting, horror and crying", to which Takada suggested Ryukishi07 of 07th Expansion be brought in to write the scenario. Ryukishi07 had previously worked with Key on the scenario for Rewrite (2011) and its fan disc Rewrite Harvest festa! (2012) because of his reputation as a horror writer.

Ryukishi07 used his experience as a horror writer, along with his recognition as an author who uses time loops in his stories, to repeat the same day in the story at given intervals as the plot progresses. As he had plenty of time for the development of the game's plot, he was able to carefully write it while continuing to discuss it with the production staff over the course of its development. In contrast to his work on Rewrite, which he views as having been written with a certain youthful vigor, he sees Loopers as a culmination of everything he has cultivated as a writer, making it his most carefully written story to date by his own admission. In keeping with Key's brand image, Ryukishi07 restrained from making the story too horrific, opting to give it a mysterious feel with a story that is 70% tear-inducing and 30% horrific, as well as making it suitable for all ages. However, some of his suggestions for horrific elements were rejected by the production staff as not being compatible with Key's image.

Ryukishi07 had not initially been familiar with geocaching when brought onto the project, and he even tried it himself with a geocaching app to get a feel for the treasure hunting process. In researching geocaching, he did not want to sully what is what he refers to as a "fun treasure hunting game," leaving out anything too extreme as a result. Ryukishi07's aim was to write a plot that was a balance between what fans of Key have come to expect from the brand and what he as a writer chosen specifically for the project could bring to add unorthodox elements not normally seen in works produced by Key. He was also attempting to write a story that worked best as a kinetic novel as opposed to a visual novel adventure game. It took him a long time to remain faithful to the story of Loopers while also adjusting its orthodox and unorthodox elements.

Kei Mochizuki is the art director and character designer for Loopers. In production meetings about what art the game would have, there were discussions about how the typical art style Key has used in their games up to now would not be the best fit for a scenario written by Ryukishi07. As a result, Takada suggested to go with Mochizuki because of her distinct art style described as not only stylish, but that which also incorporates moe elements into it to make her character designs both cool and cute according to Ryukishi07. At the time, Takada had been looking forward to what he termed a "large chemical reaction" that would occur from bringing together two creators who have very distinctive styles.

Key released a free game demo on April 26, 2021, on the game's official website. Loopers was released on May 28, 2021, for Windows in Japan. Three editions were released: a download edition just for the game itself, a limited edition, and a more expensive special edition that comes bundled with more content. Both physical editions came bundled with the game's original soundtrack and a full color art book. The special edition was also bundled with an illustrated acrylic plate, a metal key-shaped charm, a Loopers badge, an illustration signed by Kei Mochizuki, and a special card featuring the main characters.

Loopers was also ported to iOS and Android devices in Japan on July 20, 2021. Prototype released a Nintendo Switch port worldwide on June 2, 2022, with text support for Japanese, English and Chinese. Prototype also released a PlayStation 4 port worldwide on February 16, 2023, with text support for Japanese, English and Chinese. This version was released on Steam on June 27, 2023.

=== Music ===
The game's soundtrack was composed by Shinji Orito, Sōshi Hosoi, Donmaru, Hisashi Tenkyū, Shōyu and Sumi. Loopers has three theme songs: the opening theme "Senya Ichiya Vortex" (千夜一夜VORTEX), the ending theme "Fukaki Yumemishi" (フカキユメミシ), and "Kimi to no Takarasagashi" (君との宝探し) as an insert song. Each song is sung by Sana of the rock band Sajou no Hana. The Loopers Original Soundtrack was bundled with the limited and special edition releases of the game on May 28, 2021. It was released on Key Sounds Label bearing the catalog number KSLA-0184.

Loopers Original Soundtrack track listing
No.	Title	Music	Arrangement	Length
1.	"Senya Ichiya Vortex" (千夜一夜VORTEX One Thousand and One Nights Vortex) (Lyrics by Ryukishi07; Performed by Sana)	Shinji Orito	Wataru Maeguchi	4:18
2.	"Tautology"	Shinji Orito	Shinji Orito	1:26
3.	"Totteoki no Omajinai" (とっておきのおまじない Treasured Good Luck Charm)	Sōshi Hosoi	Sōshi Hosoi	2:31
4.	"Asasuzumi" (朝涼み Morning Chill)	Sōshi Hosoi	Sōshi Hosoi	2:36
5.	"Kyō mo Natsuyasumi" (今日も夏休み Today Is Also Summer Vacation)	Hisashi Tenkyū	Hisashi Tenkyū	2:25
6.	"Treasure Hunt"	Shinji Orito	Shinji Orito	1:56
7.	"Senya Ichiya Vortex -Tranquil Arrange-" (千夜一夜VORTEX One Thousand and One Nights Vortex)	Shinji Orito	Shōji Morifuji	1:53
8.	"Skyscraper"	Shōyu	Shōyu	2:26
9.	"Silly Time"	Hisashi Tenkyū	Hisashi Tenkyū	2:12
10.	"Sweet Time"	Sōshi Hosoi	Sōshi Hosoi	2:46
11.	"Hakumei" (薄明 Twilight)	Sumi	Sumi	1:53
12.	"Night View"	Shinji Orito	Shinji Orito	1:43
13.	"Shinsō Shinri" (深層心理 Deep Psyche)	Sōshi Hosoi	Sōshi Hosoi	3:17
14.	"Yamanai Kodō" (止まない鼓動 Ceaseless Heart Pounding)	Sōshi Hosoi	Sōshi Hosoi	2:13
15.	"Toshi Densetsu" (都市伝説 Urban Legend)	Sōshi Hosoi	Sōshi Hosoi	3:17
16.	"Oborozukiyo" (朧月夜 Hazy Moonlit Night)	Sumi	Sumi	2:22
17.	"Tracking"	Shōyu	Shōyu	2:14
18.	"Fukaki Yumemishi" (フカキユメミシ In a Deep Dream) (Lyrics by Donmaru and Kazuma Takada; Performed by Sana)	Donmaru	Donmaru	4:45
19.	"Deep Black"	Sōshi Hosoi	Sōshi Hosoi	2:04
20.	"Yogarasu" (夜鴉 Night Crow)	Sōshi Hosoi	Sōshi Hosoi	2:37
21.	"Rinkō" (燐光 Phosphorescence)	Sōshi Hosoi	Sōshi Hosoi	3:56
22.	"Fukaki Yumemishi -Piano Arrange-" (フカキユメミシ In a Deep Dream)	Donmaru	Donmaru	2:26
23.	"Senya Ichiya Vortex -Dreamy Arrange-" (千夜一夜VORTEX One Thousand and One Nights Vortex)	Shinji Orito	Shōji Morifuji	2:39
24.	"Toki no Yume" (時の夢 Dream of Time)	Shinji Orito	Shinji Orito	2:25
25.	"Senya Ichiya Vortex -Piano Arrange-" (千夜一夜VORTEX One Thousand and One Nights Vortex)	Shinji Orito	Ryō Mizutsuki	4:38
26.	"Kimi to no Takarasagashi" (君との宝探し Treasure Hunting With You) (Lyrics by Ryukishi07 and Kazuma Takada; Performed by Sana)	Shinji Orito	Wataru Maeguchi	5:17
Total length:				72:15

== Reception ==
Loopers premiered as the No. 11 game sold on Getchu.com, a major redistributor of visual novel and domestic anime products, during the month of its release. It later ranked as the No. 8 most sold computer game in Japan in 2021.

Fan reaction was to the English version was less positive. It was reported to be the lowest rated Key visual novel available in English by Western fans on the Visual Novel Database as of June 2023.
