= Ma-Na =

Remix album by Jun Maeda, Shinji Orito, and Magome Togoshi
- Released: August 12, 2005
- Length: 25:54
- Label: Key Sounds Label

Ma-Na is a compilation album first released on August 12, 2005 at Comiket 68 in Japan by Key Sounds Label, bearing the catalog number KSLA-0018. The album contains one disc with four tracks remixed from background music from four of Key's visual novels: Kanon, Air, Planetarian: The Reverie of a Little Planet, and Clannad. The tracks on the album were composed, arranged, and produced by Jun Maeda, Shinji Orito, and Magome Togoshi.

== Track listing ==
No.	Title	Music	Arrangement	Length
1.	"Asakage" (朝影 Morning Lights)	Shinji Orito	Jun Maeda	5:52
2.	"Natsukage" (夏影 Summer Lights)	Jun Maeda	Jun Maeda	4:57
3.	"Gentle Jena"	Magome Togoshi	Jun Maeda	7:58
4.	"Nagisa" (渚)	Jun Maeda	Jun Maeda	7:07
