= Lunaria: Virtualized Moonchild =

2021 Japanese visual novel video game

- Cover featuring heroine Lunar-Q
- Developer: Key
- Publisher: Visual Arts
- Director: Tōya Okano
- Producer: Tōya Okano
- Artists: Fumuyun; Sora Saeki
- Writer: Takeshi Matsuyama
- Composers: Shinji Orito; Donmaru; Ryō Mizutsuki; Shōji Morifuji; Hisashi Tenkyū; Shōyu; Shinpei Nasuno
- Platforms: Microsoft Windows, Android, iOS, Nintendo Switch
- Release: Windows: JP: December 24, 2021; WW: August 30, 2024; Android, iOS: JP: February 24, 2022; Nintendo Switch: WW: February 24, 2024
- Genre: Visual novel
- Mode: Single-player

Lunaria: Virtualized Moonchild is a Japanese science fiction visual novel developed by Key, a brand of Visual Arts. It was released on December 24, 2021 for Windows and is Key's 17th game overall. It was ported to iOS and Android devices, and also the Nintendo Switch. The story follows high school student Tabito Kamishiro, known as T-bit when playing the virtual reality racing game Skyout, which earns him an income in the form of prize money. One day, he wanders onto an unknown server on the Moon and meets the AI avatar Lunar-Q, who earnestly wants to see the Earth herself.

Lunaria is the fifth of Key's "kinetic novels"—beginning with Planetarian: The Reverie of a Little Planet (2004)—since its story offers no choices or alternate endings. Instead, the player proceeds through the story solely by reading. The story was written by light novel author Takeshi Matsuyama, and character design was shared between Key's in-house artist Fumuyun and Sora Saeki. The game's soundtrack was composed by Shinji Orito, Donmaru, Ryō Mizutsuki, Shōji Morifuji, Hisashi Tenkyū, Shōyu and Shinpei Nasuno.

== Development and release ==
Following Key's previous success with the production of two prior visual novels termed "kinetic novels"—Planetarian: The Reverie of a Little Planet (2004) and Harmonia (2016)—since their gameplay offers no choices or alternate endings, Lunaria was one of three kinetic novels announced in October 2020 alongside Loopers (2021) and Stella of The End (2022). Planning for the project began with video game director Daichi Koneko and producer Tōya Okano, the latter of whom has been credited on the staff of Key's visual novels since providing scenario assistance with Air (2000). The game's motif was built around the concept of esports, and Okano asked Koneko to draw up some proposals based on that theme. In addition to esports, he also wrote proposals that included virtual reality (VR) and artificial intelligence (AI), and after several failed proposals, Okano liked one about a server on the far side of the Moon which houses an AI. The basis for this proposal was Koneko wanting to write a story about the ultimate long-distance relationship, but also keep it at the "furthest point within the range of human imagination." Esports and VR were added to this concept, solidifying the project vision.

Koneko realized that they needed a writer who could write both science fiction and emotional stories that could make readers cry, which led him to seek out and read science fiction light novels that had that sort of reputation. One such novel was Iris on Rainy Days (雨の日のアイリス, Ame no Hi no Iris) by Takeshi Matsuyama, and he followed up with Matsuyama's light novel series She Was Killed By Shooting Stars (君死にたもう流星群, Kimi Shinitamō Ryūseigun), which he felt was closely related to Lunaria's concept. This resulted in Koneko contacting Matsuyama about the project in November 2019, which Matsuyama accepted despite misgivings about having never written a video game scenario before. Matsuyama started by writing out the story in the form of a novel, which was repeatedly tweaked by input from Koneko. Matsuyama also played several of Key's visual novels to give him a better idea of how they are written compared to a novel. Although Koneko had been the director of the project since its inception up to at least December 2020, the producer Okano later took over the role of director. Character design was provided by both Fumuyun, one of Key's in-house artists continuing from her work on Summer Pockets (2018) and Summer Pockets Reflection Blue (2020), and Sora Saeki. Fumuyun drew Tabito and Lunar-Q, and Saeki drew Byakko and Mew Myaf. Each of their avatars is based on an animal: a wolf for Tabito, a rabbit for Lunar-Q, a fox for Byakko and a cat for Mew.

Key released a free game demo on December 9, 2021 on the game's official website. Lunaria was released on December 24, 2021 for Windows. Three editions were released: a download edition just for the game itself, a limited edition, and a more expensive special edition that comes bundled with more content. Both physical editions came bundled with the game's original soundtrack and a full color art book. The special edition was also bundled with a tapestry, two acrylic key chains, an illustrated microfiber cloth, stickers, and a special card.

Lunaria was ported to iOS and Android devices on February 24, 2022. A Nintendo Switch port featuring English and simplified Chinese language options was released on February 24, 2024. It was released on Steam on August 30, 2024.

=== Music ===
The game's soundtrack was composed by Shinji Orito, Donmaru, Ryō Mizutsuki, Shōji Morifuji, Hisashi Tenkyū, Shōyu and Shinpei Nasuno. Lunaria has three theme songs: the first opening theme "Lunar Rise", the second opening theme "Prism no Ohimesama" (プリズムのお姫様), and the ending theme "Swing by"; each song is sung by Tsukino. The Lunaria: Virtualized Moonchild Original Soundtrack was bundled with the limited and special edition releases of the game on December 24, 2021. It was released on Key Sounds Label bearing the catalog number KSLA-0187.

Lunaria: Virtualized Moonchild Original Soundtrack track listing
No.	Title	Music	Arrangement	Length
1.	"Lunar Rise" (Lyrics by Tōya Okano; Performed by Tsukino)	Shinji Orito	Shōji Morifuji	4:47
2.	"Lunar World -first quarter-"	Ryō Mizutsuki	Ryō Mizutsuki	2:50
3.	"Moonchild"	Hisashi Tenkyū	Hisashi Tenkyū	2:25
4.	"Kamico Isle"	Shōyu	Shōyu	2:32
5.	"Cozmo"	Hisashi Tenkyū	Hisashi Tenkyū	2:20
6.	"Real Life"	Shōyu	Shōyu	2:21
7.	"Sunset Sea"	Hisashi Tenkyū	Hisashi Tenkyū	3:06
8.	"Das Vidanya"	Hisashi Tenkyū	Hisashi Tenkyū	2:01
9.	"Virtual Office"	Shōyu	Shōyu	2:19
10.	"Skyout Forever"	Shinji Orito	Shinji Orito	2:40
11.	"Dead Heat"	Shōyu	Shōyu	1:59
12.	"Dauntless Chaser"	Hisashi Tenkyū	Hisashi Tenkyū	2:34
13.	"Winning Run"	Hisashi Tenkyū	Hisashi Tenkyū	1:59
14.	"Gaming Room"	Shōji Morifuji	Shōji Morifuji	3:02
15.	"Prism no Ohimesama" (プリズムのお姫様 Prism Princess) (Lyrics by Tōya Okano; Performed by Tsukino)	Donmaru	Shinpei Nasuno	4:29
16.	"A.I."	Ryō Mizutsuki	Ryō Mizutsuki	3:30
17.	"I.D."	Hisashi Tenkyū	Hisashi Tenkyū	3:36
18.	"Sympathize"	Ryō Mizutsuki	Ryō Mizutsuki	2:07
19.	"Hidden Side -Daedalus-"	Hisashi Tenkyū	Hisashi Tenkyū	4:44
20.	"Spiritual Pain"	Hisashi Tenkyū	Hisashi Tenkyū	2:32
21.	"Operation Virtualize"	Hisashi Tenkyū	Hisashi Tenkyū	2:21
22.	"Far Distance"	Ryō Mizutsuki	Ryō Mizutsuki	2:16
23.	"Prism Princess"	Donmaru	Shōji Morifuji	2:39
24.	"Lunar Eclipse"	Ryō Mizutsuki	Ryō Mizutsuki	3:10
25.	"Swing by" (Lyrics by Tōya Okano; Performed by Tsukino)	Shinpei Nasuno	Shinpei Nasuno	3:53
Total length:				72:12

== Reception ==
Lunaria premiered as both the No. 12 game (for the limited edition) and the No. 20 game (for the special edition) sold on Getchu.com, a major redistributor of visual novel and domestic anime products, during the month of its release.
