= Tomoyo After: It's a Wonderful Life =

2005 adult visual novel

- Cover featuring heroine Tomoyo Sakagami
- Developer: Key
- Publishers: Visual Arts (Windows); Prototype (PS2, FOMA, PSP, XB360, PS3, Switch)
- Director: Jun Maeda
- Artist: Fumio
- Writers: Jun Maeda; Leo Kashida; Yūto Tonokawa
- Composers: Jun Maeda; Shinji Orito; Magome Togoshi
- Series: Clannad
- Platforms: Microsoft Windows, PlayStation 2, Freedom of Mobile Multimedia Access, PlayStation Portable, Xbox 360, Android, PlayStation 3, Nintendo Switch
- Release: November 25, 2005: Windows; JP: November 25, 2005; JP: April 30, 2010; JP: September 26, 2014 (Note: This version was titled Tomoyo After: It's a Wonderful Life Perfect Edition.); WW: July 1, 2016 PlayStation 2; JP: January 25, 2007 FOMA; JP: May 29, 2008 PlayStation Portable; JP: March 19, 2009 Xbox 360; JP: September 22, 2010 Android; JP: February 27, 2013; JP: November 2014 PlayStation 3; JP: May 29, 2013 Nintendo Switch; WW: September 10, 2020
- Genres: Eroge (Note: Only the original and 2014 Windows releases, and the 2014 Android version have adult content.); visual novel
- Mode: Single-player

Tomoyo After: It's a Wonderful Life (智代アフター ～It's a Wonderful Life～, Tomoyo Afutā ~It's a Wonderful Life~) is a Japanese adult visual novel developed by Key released on November 25, 2005, for Windows PCs. The game is a spin-off of Key's earlier all ages game Clannad. Key later released versions of Tomoyo After without the erotic content, and the game was ported to the PlayStation 2, PlayStation Portable, Xbox 360, PlayStation 3 and Nintendo Switch under the title Tomoyo After: It's a Wonderful Life CS Edition; CS stands for "consumer software". The story follows the lives of Tomoya Okazaki, a young man who recently graduated from high school, and his close friend Tomoyo Sakagami as they start to see more of each other in a romantic relationship.

The gameplay in Tomoyo After follows a branching plot line which offers predetermined scenarios with courses of interaction, and focuses on the appeal of the title character Tomoyo. Being a spin-off of Clannad, where Tomoyo is one of the game's heroines, Tomoyo After provides an expansion of Tomoyo's story after the events of Clannad and is written by Jun Maeda and Leo Kashida. The art was done by Fumio, as opposed to Itaru Hinoue who had done the art in Clannad. The game ranked as the best-selling PC game sold in Japan for the time of its release, and charted in the national top 50 twice more afterwards. A manga adaptation illustrated by Yukiko Sumiyoshi, under the title Tomoyo After: Dear Shining Memories, was serialized in Fujimi Shobo's Dragon Age Pure in 2007. Unlike the game which is told from Tomoya's point of view, the manga is told from Tomoyo's perspective. A single tankōbon volume was released in Japan in December 2007.

== Gameplay ==
An example of the RPG "Dungeons & Takafumis" featured in Tomoyo After

Tomoyo After is a romance visual novel in which the player assumes the role of Tomoya Okazaki. Much of its gameplay is spent on reading the story's narrative and dialogue. Tomoyo After follows a branching plot line with multiple endings; depending on the decisions that the player makes during the game, the plot will progress in a specific direction.

Throughout gameplay, the player is given multiple options to choose from, and text progression pauses at these points until a choice is made. To view all plot lines in their entirety, the player will have to replay the game multiple times and make different choices to bring the plot in an alternate direction. In the adult versions of the game, there are scenes with sexual CGs depicting Tomoya and Tomoyo having sex. Later, Key released versions of Tomoyo After without the erotic content. Additional gameplay in Tomoyo After is a minigame called "Dungeons & Takafumis", which gives the player chances to play in a role-playing video game setting. "Dungeons & Takafumis" becomes available to play after the game is completed once.

== Plot and characters ==
Tomoyo After's story revolves around Tomoya Okazaki (岡崎 朋也, Okazaki Tomoya; voiced by: Yūichi Nakamura (all ages Windows, PSP, PS3, Xbox 360), Yūichi Nitta in the role-playing mode only), the male protagonist from Clannad, and Tomoyo Sakagami (坂上 智代, Sakagami Tomoyo; voiced by: Hikaru Isshiki), one of the main heroines of the same game and the title character of Tomoyo After. Tomoya has already completed his first year of being a full-fledged member of society; he works as a garbage collector and a repairman. Initially, he is living in an apartment alone, as opposed with living with his father Naoyuki Okazaki (岡崎 直幸, Okazaki Naoyuki; voiced by: Shunsuke Tani) with whom he does not get along well. Tomoya still has a close friendship with Tomoyo, who has her story expanded upon than what was seen in Clannad. She has stayed in touch with Tomoya and they are starting to see more of each other in a romantic relationship.

The story takes place a month after the events of Clannad during summer vacation after Tomoya has graduated from high school; he is still in the same town Clannad was set in. One day it is discovered that Tomoyo has a younger half-sister named Tomo Mishima (三島 とも, Mishima Tomo; voiced by: Akari Sasaki) who had been living with her mother. Tomo, a young kindergartner, is the illegitimate child of Tomoyo's father and another woman named Yūko Mishima (三島 有子, Mishima Yūko; voiced by: Soyo Asaki). Tomo moves into Tomoya's apartment due to her mother's psychological problems which greatly affected the young girl. Tomoyo loves her half-sister very much and takes care of her constantly since she has always had a weakness for children.

Tomoyo also has a younger brother named Takafumi Sakagami (坂上 鷹文, Sakagami Takafumi; voiced by: Keiko Suzuki) who is very skilled with computers. He installs a personal computer in Tomoya's room, and then comes to live in the apartment. Takafumi has an ex-girlfriend named Kanako (河南子; voiced by: Keiko Suzuki) with a foul mouth and who is excessively sarcastic, whose surname is not revealed. She is not happy that her mother remarried and thus does not like to live at home. She too comes to live in Tomoya's apartment. She has a cameo appearance roughly eighteen minutes into episode six of the Clannad anime series. A central theme in the story is the ties between families, much like in Clannad.

== Development ==
Text in Tomoyo After is displayed in a dialog box, here depicting the player character talking with Tomoyo, who appears different from when in Clannad.

After releasing Clannad, Jun Maeda decided to make a game based on Tomoyo's scenario from Clannad. Maeda handled the game's planning and scenario, and Leo Kashida, a new member of the team, accompanied him. As opposed to Itaru Hinoue who was the character designer and art director for Clannad, Fumio was the art director for Tomoyo After, while Hinoue helped Fumio with the character design. As such, characters who appeared in Clannad such as Tomoya and Tomoyo look similar but visibly different from when in Clannad. Maeda also composed the music for the game along with Key's signature composers Shinji Orito and Magome Togoshi.

When Tomoyo After was ported to the PlayStation 2 (PS2), improvements to the game were included. This edition's scenario was expanded by the original staff after the removal of the adult content consisting of sex scenes. Yūto Tonokawa wrote some of the additional story for Takafumi and Kanako. With the added scenario and visuals combined, the PS2 edition is 1.5 times longer than the Windows edition. In the original version, the entire cast excluding Tomoya Okazaki, had full voice acting; this was not changed for the PlayStation 2 version. Added support was included so as to make the visuals on the television sharper than in the past with visual novels played on a consumer console rather than on a computer screen. The PS2 version also reduced flickering of the picture, reducing eyestrain.

=== Release history ===
Tomoyo After was released as an adult game on November 25, 2005, as a limited-edition version, playable on Windows PCs as a DVD, and as a bonus came bundled with the visual novel's original soundtrack. The manufacturing of the adult version has since been suspended. An updated all ages version compatible for Windows Vista PCs was released by Key on July 31, 2009, in a box set containing five other Key visual novels called Key 10th Memorial Box; this version contains the additional scenario from the PS2 version, and features full voice acting, including Tomoya. The version of Tomoyo After available in Key 10th Memorial Box was re-released on April 30, 2010, with updated compatibility for Windows 7 PCs under the title Tomoyo After: It's a Wonderful Life Memorial Edition. Key released an updated version titled Tomoyo After: It's a Wonderful Life Perfect Edition on September 26, 2014, for Windows. The Perfect Edition contains the additional content featured in the consumer ports as well as the adult content from the original version. Tomoyo After was released in English on July 1, 2016.

The first consumer console port of the game was released for the PS2 on January 25, 2007, by Prototype under the title Tomoyo After: It's a Wonderful Life CS Edition; CS stands for "consumer software". An all ages version playable on FOMA mobile phones was released on May 29, 2008, by Prototype through VisualArt's Motto, but did not include the role-playing video game "Dungeons & Takafumis". A PlayStation Portable version of the CS Edition, along with full voice acting including Tomoya, was released on March 19, 2009, by Prototype. An Xbox 360 version of the CS Edition was released by Prototype on September 22, 2010. A PlayStation 3 (PS3) version of the CS Edition was released by Prototype on July 29, 2012, as a limited edition originally sold only at the VisualArt's Daikanshasai event held that day in commemoration of the 20th anniversary of VisualArt's. The PS3 version has subsequently been sold at three other events: at Comiket 83 between December 29–31, 2012, at the 2013 Tokyo Game Show between September 21–22, and at the Character1 exhibition on May 1, 2016, to raise money for victims of the 2016 Kumamoto earthquakes, totaling ¥272,506. A downloadable version of the PS3 release via the PlayStation Store was released by Prototype on May 29, 2013. A version playable on Android devices was released on February 27, 2013, but did not include "Dungeons & Takafumis". An adult version playable on Android devices was released in November 2014. Prototype released a Nintendo Switch port on September 10, 2020, with text support for both Japanese and English.

== Related media ==
- Tomoyo After: Dear Shining Memories

智代アフター ～Dear Shining Memories～ (Tomoyo Afutā ~Dear Shining Memories~)
- Manga
- Written by: Key
- Illustrated by: Yukiko Sumiyoshi
- Published by: Fujimi Shobo
- Magazine: Dragon Age Pure
- Original run: April 20, 2007 – October 20, 2007
- Volumes: 1

=== Manga ===
A manga adaptation, illustrated by Yukiko Sumiyoshi and titled Tomoyo After: Dear Shining Memories, was serialized in Fujimi Shobo's shōnen manga magazine Dragon Age Pure between April 20 and October 20, 2007. The story is based on the visual novel version that preceded it, though instead of the story being told from Tomoya's point of view, the manga is told from Tomoyo's perspective. A single tankōbon volume was released in Japan on December 8, 2007, containing four chapters.

=== Music ===
The visual novel has two main theme songs: the opening theme "Light colors" and the ending theme "Life is like a Melody", both sung by Lia. The Tomoyo After Original Soundtrack, bundled with the original release of Tomoyo After, was released on November 25, 2005, bearing the catalog number KSLA-0020; it was re-released on April 27, 2007. The soundtrack contains 21 tracks composed, arranged, and produced by Jun Maeda, Shinji Orito, Magome Togoshi, Yuki Shimizu, Miu Uetsu, and Kazuya Takase of I've Sound. A piano arrange album was released on December 29, 2005, titled Piano no Mori which contains five tracks from Tomoyo After and five from Clannad. Each of the albums were released on Key's record label Key Sounds Label.

Tomoyo After Original Soundtrack track listing
No.	Title	Music	Arrangement	Length
1.	"Light colors" (Lyrics by Jun Maeda; Performed by Lia)	Shinji Orito	Kazuya Takase	6:38
2.	"Hope"	Jun Maeda	Yuki Shimizu	2:43
3.	"Love Song"	Jun Maeda	Yuki Shimizu	2:51
4.	"Dear Old Home"	Shinji Orito	Shinji Orito	3:31
5.	"Rivulet"	Shinji Orito	Shinji Orito	2:33
6.	"Morning Glow"	Jun Maeda	Miu Uetsu	3:03
7.	"Favorite Loop"	Magome Togoshi	Magome Togoshi	3:19
8.	"Old Summer Days"	Jun Maeda	Miu Uetsu	2:33
9.	"Harmony"	Shinji Orito	Shinji Orito	2:17
10.	"Worth Living"	Magome Togoshi	Magome Togoshi	4:10
11.	"Young Lust"	Shinji Orito	Shinji Orito	3:24
12.	"Dear Old Home (piano)"	Shinji Orito	Shinji Orito	4:13
13.	"Memories"	Jun Maeda	Miu Uetsu	2:34
14.	"Love Song (piano)"	Jun Maeda	Yuki Shimizu	3:21
15.	"Harmony With Sorrow"	Shinji Orito	Shinji Orito	3:12
16.	"Life is like a Melody" (Lyrics by Jun Maeda; Performed by Lia)	Jun Maeda	Magome Togoshi	5:25
17.	"Battle Tune"	Shinji Orito	Shinji Orito	2:22
18.	"Destroyer"	Shinji Orito	Shinji Orito	3:08
19.	"Resonator"	Shinji Orito	Shinji Orito	1:35
20.	"Light colors (short ver.)" (Lyrics by Jun Maeda; Performed by Lia)	Shinji Orito	Kazuya Takase	2:36
21.	"Life is like a Melody (short ver.)" (Lyrics by Jun Maeda; Performed by Lia)	Jun Maeda	Magome Togoshi	3:46
Total length:				69:14

== Reception ==
According to a national ranking of how well bishōjo games sold nationally in Japan, the original Tomoyo After Windows release premiered at number one in the rankings. This game stayed on the charts for a month longer, ranking in at 35 and 36. Tomoyo After for Windows was the eighth most widely sold game of 2005 on Getchu.com. In 2006, the Japanese gaming magazine PC News reported that the PS2 version of Tomoyo After was the fourth-highest selling bishōjo game of 2005 with 49,226 units sold.
