= The Day I Became a God =

Japanese anime television series

- Promotional image featuring the main characters (from left to right): Kako, Hikari, Yota, Ashura (back row); Sora, Hina, and Kyoko (front row)

神様になった日 (Kami-sama ni Natta Hi)
- Created by: Jun Maeda
- Anime television series
- Directed by: Yoshiyuki Asai
- Written by: Jun Maeda
- Music by: Jun Maeda; Manyo
- Studio: P.A. Works
- Licensed by: Crunchyroll (Note: In North America through Crunchyroll, LLC (formerly known as Funimation).); SA/SEA: Muse Communication
- Original network: Tokyo MX, GTV, GYT, BS11, ABC, Mētele, BBT
- English network: SEA: Animax Asia
- Original run: October 11, 2020 – December 27, 2020
- Episodes: 12
- Manga
- Written by: Jun Maeda
- Illustrated by: Zen
- Published by: Kadokawa Corporation
- Magazine: ComicWalker; Niconico Seiga
- Original run: November 14, 2020 – January 25, 2022
- Volumes: 2
- icon

The Day I Became a God (神様になった日, Kami-sama ni Natta Hi) is a Japanese anime television series produced by P.A. Works and Aniplex and directed by Yoshiyuki Asai. It aired from October to December 2020. The story was originally conceived by Jun Maeda, who also wrote the screenplay, with original character design by Na-Ga. Both Maeda and Na-Ga are from the visual novel brand Key, and The Day I Became a God is the third original anime series created by Key following Angel Beats! in 2010 and Charlotte in 2015.

== Plot ==
While preparing for the upcoming graduation exams in the final year of high school, Yota Narukami meets a mysterious young girl named Hina Sato, who claims she is a god named Odin. She tells Yota that the world will end in 30 days, but he remains skeptical despite her making numerous correct predictions. The story revolves around Hina assisting Yota as he helps people around town while she adjusts to her new life. As he spends more time with her, he begins to uncover more secrets about her life and how she became a "god".

== Characters ==
Hina Sato (佐藤 ひな, Sato Hina)
Voiced by: Ayane Sakura (Japanese); Dani Chambers (English)
A girl who wears a veil and claims that the world will be ending in 30 days. She has a complex concerning her surname due to how common it is, and notices how Yōta and his family and friends have names related to gods. She prefers to be called "Odin". The Narukami family claims she is a distant relative and take her in despite Yōta's objections. She enjoys food despite claiming that gods do not need to eat and is very fond of video games. She assists Yota with his attempts to confess to Kyoko by using her omniscience.
Yota Narukami (成神 陽太, Narukami Yōta)
Voiced by: Natsuki Hanae (Japanese); Mark Allen Jr. (English)
A high school student who unexpectedly meets Hina while playing basketball one day. He is skeptical of Hina's claim of the world ending in 30 days, but goes on to take care of her despite those reservations. Hina offers him her powers to support his goal of wooing his childhood friend Kyoko.
Kyoko Izanami (伊座並 杏子, Izanami Kyōko)
Voiced by: Yui Ishikawa (Japanese); Tabitha Ray (English)
Yota's childhood friend. Due to her mother passing away while she was young, she has a very calm and passive personality. Despite her calmness, she grew up to be very smart and beautiful, which led her to becoming extremely popular with other boys. Due to her calmness, she often rejects Yota's advances with little thought. She is also very good with the piano and seems to believe that Hina is telling the truth. She enjoys watching baseball.
Ashura Kokuho (国宝 阿修羅, Kokuhō Ashura)
Voiced by: Ryōhei Kimura (Japanese); Justin Cook (English)
Yota's best friend.
Sora Narukami (成神 空, Narukami Sora)
Voiced by: Yūki Kuwahara (Japanese); Megan Shipman (English)
Yota's younger sister. She is part of the film club and looks up to her senpai Hikari Jinguji. She initially has a dislike of Hina as she thinks she is very weird. She is a very caring and stubborn person. She aims to make a movie of her own.
Hiroto Suzuki (鈴木 央人, Suzuki Hiroto)
Voiced by: Chiharu Shigematsu (Japanese); Dallas Reid (English)
A mysterious young boy with silver hair. He is younger than Yota, but is a hacking prodigy. He utilizes a special set of gloves and hairclip to connect to interface with a variety of devices and networks. He is currently assisting the CEO and his assistant with her plans.
Hikari Jinguji (神宮司 ひかり, Jingūji Hikari)
Voiced by: Haruka Terui (Japanese); Natalie Hoover (English)
Sora's senpai and alumni of the film club at her school. She works at the failing ramen shop known as Ramen Heavenward in order to pay off a large debt.
Kako Tengan (天願 賀子, Tengan Kako)
Voiced by: Yū Shimamura (Japanese); Sarah Roach (English)
A very famous lawyer that Yota admires greatly. She has an extreme fascination with the game mahjong and hosts tournaments for it. She meets Yota after Hina assists him in winning a mahjong tournament.
CEO
Voiced by: Kikuko Inoue (Japanese); Mallorie Rodak (English)
A mysterious older woman who works with Hiroto to discover the truth behind a scientist's actions before he died. Despite her seemingly cold attitude, she shows motherly affection to Hiroto.
Raita Oguma (尾熊 雷太, Oguma Raita)
Voiced by: Kenichirou Matsuda (Japanese); Chris Ryan (English)
Hiroto's supervisor who works for the CEO.
Tokiko Narukami (成神 時子, Narukami Tokiko)
Voiced by: Ryoka Yuzuki (Japanese); Lydia Mackay (English)
Yota and Sora's mother. She is very caring and openly welcomes Hina to the household when Yōta calls her.
Daichi Narukami (成神 大地, Narukami Daichi)
Voiced by: Tarusuke Shingaki
Yota and Sora's father.
Motoko Shiba (司波 素子, Shiba Motoko)
Voiced by: Kaori Nazuka^{Ep. 10 credits} (Japanese); Kenneisha Thompson (English)
A staff member who cares for Hina at the Yamada Sanatorium where she is admitted. She is wary of Yota, who stimulates Hina with his voice and video games. Twelve years ago, she gave birth to a disabled baby girl, but was separated from her for treatment and died without being able to give her the love she deserved. Regretting this loss, she took her current job. As a result, she seems to be somewhat dependent on saving children with disabilities, just like her own child.

== Media ==
=== Anime ===
The Day I Became a God is the third original anime series from visual novel developer Key's Jun Maeda and Na-Ga, in collaboration with Aniplex and P.A. Works, after Angel Beats! (2010) and Charlotte (2015). On April 19, 2019, P.A. Works producer Mitsuhito Tsuji expressed desire to work on a new original anime with Key and Maeda. On November 26, 2019, Key teased on Twitter that it had eight projects in the works for its 21st anniversary, which included the Planetarian: Snow Globe original video animation project, the Kud Wafter anime film, Maeda's Heaven Burns Red video game, an unnamed visual novel, and four secret projects. On April 2, 2020, the Twitter account for Angel Beats! and Charlotte teased that a project in 2020 would be revealed.

On May 10, 2020, Key, P.A. Works, and Aniplex held a livestream on Niconico, and formally announced The Day I Became a God anime project. The livestream revealed that Maeda would be credited for the original work and script, and Na-Ga with original character design, and the anime was scheduled for an October 2020 premiere. P.A. Works also tweeted that the project had been in development for "a while", and the voice acting was pre-recorded. On May 25, 2020, a special "prologue program" aired on Tokyo MX, revealing that Ayane Sakura would be voicing Hina, as well as revealing Charlotte director Yoshiyuki Asai would be returning as director. On July 25, 2020, a second livestream was held, revealing the first full promotional video, and also revealed additional staff and cast members, with Manabu Nii serving as character designer, and Manyo and Maeda composing the series' music. The stream also teased a second promotional video being released in September 2020.

The series aired from October 11 to December 27, 2020, on Tokyo MX, BS11, GTV, GYT, ABC, and Mētele, and other channels. (Note: Tokyo MX listed the series premiere on October 10, 2020 at 24:00, which is effectively midnight on October 11 JST.) It also aired on BBT, BSS, NCC, tvk, and AT-X. The series ran for 12 episodes, and it was released on six Blu-ray and DVD volumes from December 23, 2020, to May 26, 2021, in Japan. Nagi Yanagi, in collaboration with Maeda, performed the opening theme song "Kimi to Iu Shinwa" (君という神話; lit. "Your Myth"), as well as the ending theme song "Goodbye Seven Seas".

Funimation licensed the series; they streamed it in North America, the British Isles and Latin America on their website, on AnimeLab in Australia and New Zealand, and on Wakanim in Europe. On October 30, 2020, Funimation announced that the series would receive an English dub, which premiered the following day. Following Sony's acquisition of Crunchyroll, the series was moved to Crunchyroll. The series is licensed by Muse Communication in Southeast Asia and South Asia, and it was streamed on iQIYI and aired on Animax in Southeast Asia.

==== Episodes ====
No.	Title (Note: All English titles are taken from Funimation.)	Directed by	Written by	Original release date
1	"The Day a God Descended"; Transliteration: "Kōrin no Hi" (Japanese: 降臨の日)	Yuriko Abe	Jun Maeda	October 11, 2020
Yota Narukami encounters a young girl in a veil who declares herself to be Odin. Both he and his friend Ashura Kokuho are skeptical of her and dismiss her claims. Yota learns that her real name is Hina Sato while trying to convince her to go home. Hina refuses and ends up going to the library with him to study with his childhood friend Kyoko Izanami and are ultimately kicked out. Yota reluctantly starts to believe in her abilities after they eat at a ramen shop where Hina correctly identifies the finishing position of a horse race. Hina then offers Yota her abilities to assist him in wooing Kyoko. This leads him to playing a game of baseball against the high school team and failing in front of Kyoko. Afterward, Yota's mother eagerly welcomes Hina to stay at their home, much to Yota's disbelief.
2	"The Day of the Melody"; Transliteration: "Shirabe no Hi" (Japanese: 調べの日)	Akira Takamura	Jun Maeda	October 18, 2020
Yota and Hina arrive at Yota's house where Hina is welcomed with open arms. While in Yota's room, Hina plays a video game. The next day, Yota reveals that Kyoko became an introvert after her mother died. He also reveals how long he has had feelings for her. When Yota agrees to appear in Sora's movie, Hina decides to write the script so he can woo Kyoko. However, this plan fails. Hina later reveals that Kyoko plans to become a music director. As such, Hina helps Yota write a song. When Yota attempts to play the song for Kyoko, he struggles to do so, which leads to her playing it instead. That night, a bruised Sora is brought to the house by her senpai.
3	"The Day the Angel Falls"; Transliteration: "Tenshi ga Ochiru Hi" (Japanese: 天使が堕ちる日)	Tadahito Matsubayashi	Jun Maeda	October 25, 2020
The next morning, Sora awakens to reveal that Hikari Jinguji, her senpai, works at her mother's failing ramen shop and she was helping Hikari deal with a loan shark. Hina decides to help out by having Yota pretend to be Sora's uncle so he act as a business consultant. He then makes sweeping changes at the shop, which causes it to become a huge success. Meanwhile, a mysterious boy arrives in Japan where he uses his hacking skills to help a mother find her daughter. Back at the shop, Hikari is confronted by the loan shark where Yōta, with Hina's help, defeats him. Afterward, Hikari reveals that she knew the truth about who Yota was and she thanks him, Hina and Sora for helping her. Later, the mysterious boy, whose name is Hiroto Suzuki, is working for a company to discover the secret Shuichiro Korogi, a physicist, is hiding.
4	"The Day of Battling Tiles"; Transliteration: "Tōhai no Hi" (Japanese: 闘牌の日)	Souta Ueno	Jun Maeda	November 1, 2020
Hiroto starts his investigation by having the CEO interview Dr. Asama, the co-author of Korogi's thesis. Meanwhile, Yota is watching Kako Tengan, a famous lawyer, being interviewed on TV. Later, Hina wins the mahjong preliminaries online under Yota's name. She reveals she did this in order to ensure that Yota meets Kako in person at a mahjong tournament she is organizing. Two days later, Yota heads out to compete in the Libertas Cup while Hina, Kyoko, and Ashura cheer him on. In the waiting room, Yota meets Kako. Once the match begins, Yota follows Hina's instructions, which initially has him in last place. However, as the match continues, he starts to make a comeback when he uses unconventional methods, which impresses Kako. As such, Yota proceeds to win the Libertas Cup. After the match, Kako attempts to seduce Yota. However, he turns her down, much to her chagrin. When he tells Hina what happened, she is annoyed at the missed opportunity.
5	"The Day of Grand Magic"; Transliteration: "Dai Mahō no Hi" (Japanese: 大魔法の日)	Yuriko Abe	Jun Maeda	November 8, 2020
Kyoko tries to convince her father to visit her mother's grave without success. At the library, Kyoko reveals to Yota how her father has been a recluse since her mother died. Hina decides to have Yōta get Kyoko's father out of his house. When they arrive there, Yota finally succeeds when he claims that he needs help buying Kyoko a birthday present. While they are out, they eat at a few restaurants. Afterwards, Kyoko's father reveals that his wife left video messages and he asks Yota and Hina to not tell Kyoko's about them. Hina later uses Yota's phone in order to pretend to be Kyoko's mother. During the conversation between Hina and Kyoko, Hina mentions the video messages, which causes Kyoko to rush home. There, she and her father watch them together. When they watch the final message, Kyoko's mother uses her grand magic spell so they can be happy and move forward with their lives, which they agree to do. That night, Kyoko arrives at Yota's house to thank him. However, he does not confess his feelings, much to Hina's exasperation.
6	"The Day of the Festival"; Transliteration: "Matsuri no Hi" (Japanese: 祭の日)	Ryōta Kitsunai	Jun Maeda	November 15, 2020
Yota dreams of him and Ashura competing in a high school basketball game. Hina later convinces Yota to call and invite his friends to a summer festival taking place. While at the festival, they take part in a variety of games, which includes goldfish scooping, shooting galleries, ball tosses, and a haunted house. During this time, Ashura and Yota reminisce about their friendship. Meanwhile, Hina seemingly gets jealous of Yota and Kyoko's improving friendship. She walks off where she heads inside a refrigerated truck that closes and drives off. The group realize she is missing and search for her. When Yota and Ashura find Hina's items on the ground, they learn from another truck driver the direction where the truck is headed. They give chase on Ashura's motorcycle and are ultimately able to get the driver to stop. Once everyone reunites, they watch the fireworks together.
7	"The Day of Filming"; Transliteration: "Eiga Satsuei no Hi" (Japanese: 映画撮影の日)	Masanori Takahashi, Akira Takahashi	Jun Maeda	November 22, 2020
Yota is in his room studying when Hina walks in, saying the world will end in nine days and Sora has finished the script for her movie. When Yota reads the script, he enjoys it. He then gathers his friends to help shoot the movie. Once Sora finishes the storyboard, she explains the plot of the movie. On the day the shoot begins, Yota and Hina play the lead roles. However, the movie runs into several problems. While they are taking a break, Yota tells Hina how he has enjoyed hanging out with her and he praises her for helping everybody. When the shoot resumes, there are problems with the CG until Hina finally fixes it. Later that night, Yota teases Hina about how much she enjoyed herself. Meanwhile, Hiroto is still investigating when he finds Korogi's torn down house. When he learns the possessions have been sent to a recycling plant, he heads there just in time to grab a picture that has Hina in it.
8	"The Day of the Trip to the Beach"; Transliteration: "Umi o Mi ni Iku Hi" (Japanese: 海を見にいく日)	Yuriko Abe	Jun Maeda	November 29, 2020
Hina has a dream where she hangs out with her grandfather. While everyone at the set, Yota wonders what is going to happen once summer ends. When he expresses his concern to his parents, they reveal that Hina is actually the granddaughter of their mentor and that Hina's father abandoned her. After Yota has a conversation with Hina about when she became a god, they decide to go meet her father. When they arrive at his house, Hina's father and stepmother, Toshitoku and Isuzu Sato, are shocked when they see Hina in person. While Yota and Toshitoku are alone, Toshitoku reveals that Hina was born with a debilitating condition known as Logos Syndrome, which caused him to abandon her when he realized there was nothing he could do to help her. Once Yota and Hina leave, Yota is agitated about the situation. Later that night, Hiroto shows up at Toshitoku's house.
9	"The Day of the Deicide"; Transliteration: "Kami-goroshi no Hi" (Japanese: 神殺しの日)	Fumihiko Suganuma	Jun Maeda	December 6, 2020
While everyone at the set, Hiroto secretly observes Hina and Yota. He then decides to go home to continue his analysis. At his house, Hiroto makes a shocking discovery. A dream Hiroto has reveals that his abusive parents used his hacking skills to money launder. The next day, Hiroto reports to the CEO his findings of a chip-size quantum computer Korogi completed. However, she denies his request to analyze it, much to his frustration. Back at his house, Hiroto uses his skills to find the computer. During his search, he remembers when his parents were murdered. Afterward, Hiroto tells the CEO that the computer was planted in Hina's head, which explains her miraculous recovery and omniscience. When Hiroto realizes Hina is in trouble, he warns her. As such, she tells everyone that her world will end soon. They are then approached by men in suits. Yota attempts to run away with Hina. However, she willingly surrenders.
10	"Days That Pass By"; Transliteration: "Sugisaru Hi" (Japanese: 過ぎ去る日)	Akira Takamura	Jun Maeda	December 13, 2020
After Hina's departure, Yota attempts to move on with his life. While he is at school, Yota encounters Hiroto, who claims to be a new transfer student. He then hangs out with Yota and his friends. Several months later, however, a frustrated Hiroto calls out Yota for not understanding why he befriended him. Just as he is about to leave, Yota catches up with him after he realizes Hiroto was recreating the days he spent with Hina. Hiroto reveals that Hina is alive and he knows her location. That night, he takes Yota to the Yamada Sanatorium where he gives him a false identity as a research assistant that is good for two weeks. Inside, Yota meets Motoko Shiba, a visiting researcher, and she takes him to see Hina. There, Shiba reveals that cranial surgery was performed on Hina and she has an extreme fear of men. Seeing Hina's condition agitates Yota.
11	"Days of Play"; Transliteration: "Yūgi no Hi" (Japanese: 遊戯の日)	Tadahito Matsubayashi	Jun Maeda	December 20, 2020
At the Yamada Sanatorium, Yota observes Hina's daily routine. He then does his report for the day. When he heads back to Hina's room, Yota reveals that he is permitted to spend an hour with her. However, she rejects him. While they are alone, Shiba tells Yota that he has to look at Hina in the eye before he can gain her trust. When they meet up again, she tells him that Hina might have lost her memories following the surgery. A despondent Yota is alone outside when he receives encouraging words from his friends and family. Motivated, he decides to bring a video game so Hina can play it. However, she gets stuck. While Shiba tends to Hina, she reveals that she got in her line of work after her daughter died. Yota later decides to play the game overnight in order to help Hina. When Shiba discovers Yota's falsified reports, he is contacted by a security officer.
12	"The Day You Choose"; Transliteration: "Kimi ga Erabu Hi" (Japanese: きみが選ぶ日)	Yuriko Abe, Fumihiko Suganuma, Ryōta Kitsunai	Jun Maeda	December 27, 2020
While he is with Hina, Yota is called out by Shiba and she tells him to leave. He then begs her to allow him to spend one last half day with Hina. As he talks to Hina, she recognizes and pronounce the names of his family. However, when he shows her his picture, she throws it to the ground. After that, Shiba tells Yota that his time is up. Just as he is about leave, Hina starts crying and tries to walk towards Yota, saying she loves him. Yota takes Hina home and everyone agrees to complete the movie. Yota decides to become a researcher like Hina's grandfather so he can cure her condition. Afterward, everyone watches the movie together. At the end of the movie, Hina reveals in a making-of interview that her memories are so beautiful that they will never disappear and she refers to them as an eternal treasure. Yota decides that no matter what hardship they face, he will continue to be by Hina's side.

=== Manga ===
A manga adaptation, illustrated by Zen, was serialized on Kadokawa Corporation's ComicWalker and Niconico Seiga websites from November 14, 2020, to January 25, 2022, via Dengeki G's Magazine. Two tankōbon volumes were published from May 27, 2021, to February 26, 2022.

==== Volumes ====
No.	Release date	ISBN
1	May 27, 2021	978-4-04-913721-7
1. Kōrin no Hi (降臨の日); 2. Shirabe no Hi (調べの日); 3. Tenshi ga Ochiru Hi (天使が堕ちる日); 4. Tōhai no Hi (闘牌の日); 5. Dai Mahō no Hi (大魔法の日); 6. Matsuri no Hi (祭の日); 7. Eiga Satsuei no Hi 1 (映画撮影の日①)
2	February 26, 2022	978-4-04-914109-2
8. Eiga Satsuei no Hi 2 (映画撮影の日②); 9. Umi o Mi ni Iku Hi (海を見に行く日); 10. Kami-goroshi no Hi 1 (神殺しの日①); 11. Kami-goroshi no Hi 2 (神殺しの日②); 12. Saikai no Hi (再会の日); 13. Yūgi no Hi (遊戯の日); 14. Kimi ga Erabu Hi (君が選ぶ日); 15. Korekara no Hibi (これからの日々)

== Reception ==
The series received a mixed reception. In reviewing the first episode, Vrai Kaiser of Anime Feminist said that while the series was not bad, its writing could unearth "a kind of camaraderie in the face of despair," but that these two months were "preceded by 20 minutes of noise," but that there was potential in the series. In a review of the first three episodes, Meru Clewis on the same website said they approached the series enthusiastically due to fond memories of Angel Beats but was apprehensive, saying it had the potential to be "really, genuinely interesting" if Hina's character was improved, and hoped that the series got better.
