= Anemoi (video game) =

- Cover art
- Developer: Key
- Publisher: Visual Arts
- Artists: Ao Kimishima; Yūnon Nagayama; Fumuyun; Na-Ga
- Writers: Hasama; Kai; Shun Sayuki; Yū Niijima
- Composers: Shinji Orito; Ryō Mizutsuki; Shūhei Ōhashi; Taisuke Takanashi; Hayato Asano; Shōyu; Hisashi Tenkyū
- Platform: Windows
- Release: JP: April 24, 2026; WW: TBA
- Genre: Visual novel
- Mode: Single-player

Anemoi (アネモイ) (Note: The title of the game, Anemoi, comes from Greek mythology, where it refers to the personifications of the various winds depicted in the classical wind rose.) is an all-ages Japanese visual novel developed by Key, a brand under Visual Arts. The game was released in Japan on April 24, 2026, with a worldwide release on Steam planned for a later date. It has been promoted as the company's latest full-price title. The game features five heroines with mainline routes.

Scenario writers Yū Niijima and Hasama, who previously worked with Key on Summer Pockets, returned as writers for Anemoi. Several other staff members, including Na-Ga and Shinji Orito, also contributed to the project, having previously worked on earlier Key titles such as Air, Clannad, and Little Busters!

== Synopsis ==
The game is set in Masumi (真澄), a fictional small town in northern Japan, characterized by its rural surroundings and countryside landscape.

The protagonist, Mugi Hayakawa (速川麦, Hayakawa Mugi) returns to his childhood town with his sister, Rikka Hayakawa (速川六花, Hayakawa Rikka) ten years after burying a time capsule. Mugi plans to relax and enjoy his time in town until the moment comes to reopen it.

== Development ==
=== Marketing ===
The project was first announced on November 15, 2023, through a social media post on Key's official Twitter account, accompanied by a short video teaser. On the same day, the official website for Anemoi was launched. A livestream was later scheduled for November 17, 2023, providing additional information about the visual novel.

On June 14, 2024, Key held another livestream, which included teasers of the game's artwork and announced the official release window for 2025. During the broadcast, the names of the main characters and their full-body portraits were revealed.

Another livestream was announced via Twitter on August 8, 2025, with the broadcast scheduled for August 18, 2025. The event featured the first ever reproduction of the opening theme song and movie. The release date of the visual novel was postponed to January 30, 2026. The game's director, Kai, also confirmed that the studio does not currently plan to develop an expansion for the visual novel, in contrast to Summer Pockets which had Summer Pockets Reflection Blue. On the same live event, it was also announced that Anemoi will be published on Steam in English, Japanese and simplified Chinese.

=== Music ===
The game's opening theme is "Eternicle" (エタニルク, Etaniruku) by Asca, and the ending theme is "Goldenfield" by Fhána.
