= Stella of The End =

2022 Japanese visual novel video game

- Developer: Key
- Publisher: Visual Arts
- Director: Shun Sayuki
- Producer: Tōya Okano
- Artist: Swav
- Writer: Romeo Tanaka
- Composers: Tsubasa Harihara; Ice
- Platforms: Microsoft Windows, Android, iOS, Nintendo Switch
- Release: Windows: JP: September 30, 2022; WW: September 26, 2023; Android, iOS: JP: April 21, 2023; Nintendo Switch: WW: December 5, 2024
- Genre: Visual novel
- Mode: Single-player

Stella of The End (終のステラ, Tsui no Sutera) is a Japanese post-apocalyptic visual novel developed by Key, a brand of Visual Arts. It was released on September 30, 2022 for Windows and is Key's 18th game overall. It was ported to iOS and Android devices, and also the Nintendo Switch. The story follows transporter Jude Gray who accepts a request to deliver a gynoid named Philia to a client amid avoiding dangers from human bandits and machines who have created a "singularity".

Stella of The End is the sixth of Key's "kinetic novels"—beginning with Planetarian: The Reverie of a Little Planet (2004)—since its gameplay offers no choices or alternate endings. Instead, the player proceeds through the story solely by reading. The story was written by Romeo Tanaka, and character design was produced by Swav. The game's soundtrack was composed by Tsubasa Harihara and Ice.

== Development and release ==
Following Key's previous success with the production of two prior visual novels termed "kinetic novels"—Planetarian: The Reverie of a Little Planet (2004) and Harmonia (2016)—since their gameplay offers no choices or alternate endings, Stella of The End was one of three kinetic novels announced in October 2020 alongside Loopers (2021) and Lunaria: Virtualized Moonchild (2021). Planning for the project began with video game director Shun Sayuki, who also developed the game's motif built around the concept of a courier who transports an android. Sayuki's intention was to create the type of story where the characters go on a round trip journey, while also incorporating a "boy meets girl" element. According to Sayuki, Key's kinetic novel series involves attempts to try things that go beyond what Key has gained a reputation for producing. With Stella of The End, Sayuki was unsure how far to exceed that fixed idea of "what makes up a Key production," but because its concept was solidified as a hard science fiction story with portions to make readers cry as its foundation, Sayuki did not see a problem with making its tone somewhat different than Key's other works. When it came time to present the proposal for the project, Sayuki wanted a writer who could expand on its hard science fiction themes so as to develop a more solid world, leading him to approach Romeo Tanaka to write the scenario. Tanaka had previously worked with Key on the scenario for Rewrite (2011) and its fan disc Rewrite Harvest festa! (2012). Sayuki was impressed with Tanaka's ability to take his rough concept and form it into a coherent and convincing story as a result of how Tanaka rationalizes science fiction phenomena. Tanaka even uses the term "artificial ego" in the story as a way to distinguish it from artificial intelligence.

Swav is the art director and character designer for Stella of The End. Sayuki had been in search of an illustrator familiar with drawing science fiction and contacted Swav shortly after viewing his artwork. In keeping with a story set in the near future, Swav's aim was to give it the appearance similar to a film, which was based on how kinetic novels could be described as "novels akin to watching a film". Swav wanted to capture the atmosphere that comes from film-like art, opting to apply a jade green filter to the game's art. As Swav developed the character art, Sayuki used his experience having worked on bishōjo games to mediate between Swav's art style and Key's brand image, even requesting Swav to redesign entire characters at times. For instance, Swav was asked during a production meeting to redesign Philia to "emphasize how she is presented as the story's heroine," to which Swav responded that he would attempt to "merge a film-like design with how things are presented in bishōjo games." Swav consulted several films, including Interstellar, when drawing the game's art. Swav was also instrumental in changing the game's original title of Owari no Stella to Tsui no Stella by using a different reading of the kanji for "end" (終) so that the title would not be overly similar to Seraph of the End (終わりのセラフ, Owari no Serafu).

For the game's music, the production team wanted to go with composers who had not worked on any of Key's works. In finding someone to compose the game's theme music, the emphasis was for someone who could compose tear-jerking songs, leading to Sayuki to suggest Tsubasa Harihara. Sayuki had been impressed by Harihara's song "Hotaru (firefly)" (蛍 -firefly-) and how listening to it gave him a clear mental image of how the story's backdrop is described in the song. Sayuki's proposal was quickly approved, and Harihara accepted the position. For the background music, Sayuki was in search of a composer appropriate for a science fiction story that could compose music akin to the piano pieces featured in Key's works that leave a lasting impression on the listener. That type of music reminded him of Rayark's 2013 rhythm game Deemo, and ultimately the composer Ice who worked on the game.

Stella of The End was released on September 30, 2022 for Windows. Three editions were released: a download edition just for the game itself, a limited edition, and a more expensive special edition that comes bundled with more content. Both physical editions come bundled with the game's original soundtrack and a full color art book. The special edition also comes with a tapestry and an epilogue book.

It was ported to iOS and Android devices in Japan on April 21, 2023, and to the Nintendo Switch on December 5, 2024.
