= Humanity... =

2001 album by Shinji Orito and other artists

Studio album by Shinji Orito, Magome Togoshi, Mitsuru Sekiyama, Yasushi Tanno, and Shigeru Kiyokawa
- Released: August 10, 2001
- Length: 50:33
- Label: Key Sounds Label

Humanity... is an album featuring songs composed by Shinji Orito, Magome Togoshi, Mitsuru Sekiyama, Yasushi Tanno, and Shigeru Kiyokawa. The album was first released on August 10, 2001 at Comiket 60 in Japan by Key Sounds Label bearing the catalog number KSLA-0001. The album contains one disc with ten tracks; eight of the ten are sung by Hidetsuna Fujita, and Mina Minomo, and the lyrics for the songs were written by Jun Maeda, Tanno, Fujita, and Kazumi Ōtsuka. Excluding the last track, "Tori no Uta (Bossanova Version)", which is a remix of a song originally featured in Key's visual novel Air, none of the other tracks are related to visual novels by Key.

== Track listing ==
No.	Title	Lyrics	Music	Length
1.	"Again" (Performed by Hidetsuna Fujita)	Kazumi Ōtsuka	Mitsuru Sekiyama	5:14
2.	"Summer Wind" (Performed by Hidetsuna Fujita)	Yasushi Tanno	Yasushi Tanno	4:12
3.	"Natsu e Tsuzuku Shōkei" (夏へ続く小径 The Summer Path Continues) (Performed by Mina Minomo)	Jun Maeda	Shinji Orito	4:57
4.	"Haru no Gogo, Boku wa Nagai Tabi o Shita" (春の午後、僕は長い旅をした In the Spring Afternoon, I Traveled a Long Distance) (Performed by Hidetsuna Fujita)	Jun Maeda	Magome Togoshi	5:44
5.	"Shadow of Silence"		Yasushi Tanno	5:15
6.	"Wrist" (Performed by Mina Minomo)	Jun Maeda	Magome Togoshi	4:38
7.	"Run" (Performed by Hidetsuna Fujita)	Jun Maeda	Shinji Orito	5:39
8.	"Highway Passing"		Shigeru Kiyokawa	4:00
9.	"Love is Eternal" (Performed by Hidetsuna Fujita and Mina Minomo)	Hidetsuna Fujita	Mitsuru Sekiyama	5:43
10.	"Tori no Uta (Bossanova Version)" (鳥の詩 Bird's Poem) (Performed by Mina Minomo)	Jun Maeda	Shinji Orito	5:11
