= Rikka (disambiguation) =

Rikka is a form of ikebana.

Rikka can also refer to:

== People ==
- Antonis Rikka, (born 1986) Greek football player
- Rikka Deinboll, (1897–1973) Norwegian librarian and translator
- Rikka Ihara, (born 1999) Japanese actress, singer, model, and radio personality
- Ryōko Ono (born 1977), known as Rikka Kitami, Japanese voice actress.

== Characters ==
- Rikka Hayakawa, a fictional character from the Japanese visual novel, Anemoi (video game)
- Rikka Hiiragi, a fictional character from the Japanese anime series, Shugo Chara!
- Rikka Hishikawa, a fictional character from the Japanese anime television series, DokiDoki! PreCure
- Rikka Inohana, a fictional character from the Japanese manga series, Tune In to the Midnight Heart
- Rikka Isurugi, a fictional character from the Japanese anime series, Blackfox
- Rikka Sakuragawa, a fictional character from the Japanese novel series, In/Spectre
- Rikka Shinozaki, a fictional character from the Japanese adult yuri visual novel, A Kiss for the Petals
- Rikka Takanashi, a fictional character from the Japanese light novel and anime series, Love, Chunibyo & Other Delusions
- Rikka Takarada, a fictional character from the Japanese anime television series, SSSS.Gridman

== See also ==
- another term for Lixia in traditional East Asian calendars
