= Prima Doll =

Japanese media franchise

- Promotional image featuring characters (clockwise from lower left): Retzel, Hōkiboshi, Karasuba, Gekka and Haizakura

プリマドール (Purima Dōru)
- Created by: Key; Visual Arts
- Serial novel

Prima Doll Encore
- Written by: Tōya Okano
- Illustrated by: Maroyaka
- Published by: Visual Arts
- Original run: October 26, 2020 – August 27, 2021
- Serial novel

Prima Doll Interlude
- Written by: Kai
- Illustrated by: Maroyaka
- Published by: ASCII Media Works
- Magazine: Dengeki G's Magazine
- Original run: October 30, 2020 – September 30, 2021
- Anime television series
- Directed by: Tensho
- Written by: Kai; Tōya Okano
- Studio: Bibury Animation Studios
- Licensed by: Sentai Filmworks
- Original network: Tokyo MX, MBS, BS Asahi, AT-X
- English network: SEA: Aniplus Asia
- Original run: July 9, 2022 – September 24, 2022
- Episodes: 12
- Manga

Prima Doll: New Order
- Written by: Yuriko Asami
- Published by: Kadokawa Shoten
- Magazine: ComicWalker; NicoNico Seiga
- Original run: July 15, 2022 – April 30, 2024
- Volumes: 2
- Manga

Prima Doll: Yōkoso Kuronekotei e
- Written by: Daiko Toda
- Published by: Bushiroad
- Magazine: Comic Bushiroad Web
- Original run: August 12, 2022 – May 12, 2023
- Volumes: 1
- Video game
- Developer: Key
- Publisher: Visual Arts
- Genre: Visual novel
- Platform: Windows
- Released: Fuyuzora Hanabi / Sekka Mon'you: JP: April 28, 2023; Mumei Tenrei: JP: May 31, 2024; Kouto Tantei: JP: TBA; Encore: JP: TBA

Prima Doll (プリマドール, Purima Dōru) is a Japanese multimedia project created by Key and Visual Arts in October 2020, which also includes toy figurines by Kotobukiya, a short story serialization and a web novel. A 12-episode anime television series by Bibury Animation Studios aired from July to September 2022. A four-volume kinetic novel series written by Tōya Okano is in development by Key.

== Characters ==
=== Kuronekotei ===
Haizakura (灰桜)
Voiced by: Azumi Waki
A doll whose settings were once reset before coming to Kuronekotei. Because of this, she is ignorant of the ways of world and sometimes clumsy. However, she always tries her best to do something for the people around her. She is 138cm, and her favorite food is Anpan. Her dream is to learn about her own function.
Karasuba (鴉羽)
Voiced by: Tomori Kusunoki
The leader of the dolls at Kuronekotei. She is sometimes strict, but is very caring of people around her. Her body parts are made from junk parts that Nagi found in order to repair her. Despite her parts being old and worn, she refuses to exchange her parts for new ones as she believes her body is a gift that Nagi gave to her. She is 155cm, and her favorite food is a rich peanut butter shake. Her dream is to protect Kuronekotei.
Gekka (月下)
Voiced by: Miyu Tomita
A doll whose favorite food is taiyaki. She speaks in a blunt tone. Her dream is to embark on a new mission.
Hōkiboshi (箒星)
Voiced by: Yuki Nakashima
Retzel (レーツェル, Rētseru)
Voiced by: Akari Kitō
Nagi Tōma (遠間 ナギ, Tōma Nagi)
Voiced by: Ayumu Murase

=== Others ===
Chiyo (千代)
Voiced by: Misaki Kuno
A girl who sometimes helps out at Kuronekotei.
Otome Okunomiya (奥宮 おとめ, Okunomiya Otome)
Voiced by: Ayaka Suwa
Nagi's ex co-worker.
Yūgiri (夕霧)
Voiced by: Mikako Komatsu
Haikagura (灰神楽)
Voiced by: Tomoyo Kurosawa

== Media ==
=== Print ===
A web novel titled Prima Doll Encore (プリマドール・アンコール), written by Tōya Okano and illustrated by Maroyaka, has been periodically released on the project's official website since October 26, 2020. Encore features spoken lines of dialogue and as a result is referred to as a "lite kinetic novel" in reference to Key's line of visual novels described as kinetic novels because their gameplay offers no choices or alternate endings.

A series of short stories titled Prima Doll Interlude (プリマドール -interlude-), written by Kai and illustrated by Maroyaka, began serialization in ASCII Media Works's Dengeki G's Magazine with the December 2020 issue sold on October 30. The serialization continued on a monthly basis until the November 2021 issue sold on September 30 when it was announced that it would halt temporarily.

Two manga adaptations were announced: Prima Doll New Order (プリマドール New Order), illustrated by Yuriko Asami, began serialization on the ComicWalker and Nico Nico Seiga websites on July 15, 2022. Prima Doll: Yōkoso Kuronekotei e (プリマドール ～ようこそ黒猫亭へ～, Prima Doll: Welcome to Kuronekotei), illustrated by Daiko Toda, began serialization on the Comic Bushiroad Web platform on August 12, 2022.

=== Anime ===
An anime television series, directed by Tensho and animated by Bibury Animation Studios, aired from July 9 to September 24, 2022, on Tokyo MX, MBS, BS Asahi, and AT-X. (Note: Tokyo MX lists the series premiere at 24:30 on July 8, 2022, which is effectively 12:30 a.m. JST on July 9.) The screenplay is written by Kai and Tōya Okano. Character design is provided by Akane Yano who based the designs on original illustrations by Na-Ga, Fuzichoco, Yui Hara, En Morikura and Lack. The opening theme song is "Tin Toy Melody" composed by Jun Maeda, and performed by Chat Noir (consisting of Azumi Waki, Tomori Kusunoki, Miyu Tomita, Yuki Nakashima and Akari Kitō). The series is licensed worldwide excluding Asian territories by Sentai Filmworks.

==== Episode list ====
No.	Title	Directed by	Written by	Storyboarded by	Original release date (Note: Episodes are released on ABEMA five days before their air dates on television.)
1	"The First Melody"; Transliteration: "Hajimete no Senritsu" (Japanese: はじめての旋律)	Yūichirō Aoki	Tōya Okano	Tenshō	July 9, 2022
2	"Playing Alongside the Moon"; Transliteration: "Tsuki to Kanaderu" (Japanese: 月と奏でる)	Yūichirō Aoki	Tōya Okano	Komari Kamikita	July 16, 2022
3	"Starry Sky Requiem"; Transliteration: "Hoshizora no Chinkonka" (Japanese: 星空の鎮魂歌)	Yūichirō Aoki	Tōya Okano	Yūichirō Aoki	July 23, 2022
4	"Fluttering Wings Return"; Transliteration: "Haoto wa Meguru" (Japanese: 羽音は巡る)	Kai Hasako; Takanori Yamamoto	Tōya Okano	Komari Kamikita; Tenshō	July 30, 2022
5	"Singing in the Rain"; Transliteration: "Ame ni Utaeba" (Japanese: 雨に歌えば)	Shigeo Koshi	Tōya Okano	Komari Kamikita	August 6, 2022
6	"The Black Cat's Concert"; Transliteration: "Kuronekotei no Ongakukai" (Japanese: 黒猫亭の音楽会)	Yūichirō Aoki	Kai	Yūichirō Aoki; Tenshō	August 13, 2022
7	"Dreamlike Days"; Transliteration: "Musō no Hibi" (Japanese: 夢想の日々)	Yūichirō Aoki	Tōya Okano	Kento Shintani	August 20, 2022
8	"Rondo of Eternal Winter"; Transliteration: "Tokofuyu no Rondo" (Japanese: 常冬のロンド)	Akira Katō	Kai	Ryūta Yamamoto	August 27, 2022
9	"A Momentary Sextet"; Transliteration: "Hitotoki no Rokujūsō" (Japanese: ひとときの六重奏)	Ryūta Yamamoto; Yūichirō Aoki	Kai	Ryūta Yamamoto	September 3, 2022
10	"Unending Unison"; Transliteration: "Seishō wa Owaranai" (Japanese: 斉唱は終わらない)	Takanori Yamamoto	Kai	Takanori Yamamoto	September 10, 2022
11	"Thunderous War Song"; Transliteration: "Senka Banrai" (Japanese: 戦歌万雷)	Akiko Seki	Tōya Okano	Satoshi Shimizu	September 17, 2022
12	"Let These Feelings Resound"; Transliteration: "Kono Omoi, Hibikasete" (Japanese: この想い、響かせて)	Yūichirō Aoki	Tōya Okano	Tenshō	September 24, 2022

=== Visual novels ===
A series of four visual novels, described as kinetic novels since their gameplay offers no choices or alternate endings, is in development by Key. The main scenario is written by Tōya Okano, who co-wrote the scenario for the anime adaptation. The first volume was released in 2023 and the second in 2024.

=== Other ===
In collaboration with plastic model and figurine manufacturer Kotobukiya, a series of 1/7 scale figurines of the characters was announced to be in production in October 2020. A figurine of Haizakura was released on August 30, 2021, and the limited edition release came bundled with the single "Kikaijikake no Sanka / Usuhanazakura" (機械仕掛けの賛歌 / 薄花桜, Mechanical Song of Praise / Light Pink). "Kikaijikake no Sanka" is sung by Azumi Waki, Tomori Kusunoki, Miyu Tomita, Yuki Nakashima and Akari Kitō; "Usuhanazakura" is sung by Waki. A figurine of Karasuba was announced in May 2021.
