= Fumio (illustrator) =

Japanese illustrator

Fumio (フミオ) is a Japanese illustrator from Osaka Prefecture who works on the art for adult visual novels. He has worked for several different visual novel companies, such as Front Wing, Jaleco, Circus, F&C, and Key.

== Games illustrated ==
- Crank In
- Grisaia no Kajitsu
- Hoshiuta
  - Hoshiuta: Starlight Serenade
- Pia Carrot G.O. TOYBOX ~Summer Fair~
- Sorauta
- Tomoyo After: It's a Wonderful Life
- Yukiuta

== Novels illustrated ==
- Canvas 2 ~Niji Iro no Sketch~
- Hourglass of Summer
- Sakura: Yuki Tsuki Hana
