= KineticNovel =

Japanese visual novel publisher

- Native name: キネティックノベル
- Company type: Visual novel publisher
- Industry: Computer games
- Headquarters: Kita-ku, Osaka Prefecture, Japan
- Products: Visual novels
- Website: kineticnovel.jp

KineticNovel (キネティックノベル, Kinetikku Noberu) is a brand of the Japanese software publishing company Visual Arts. The productions of the KineticNovel label are unlike other visual novels in that no choices are given to the player – they have only one possible outcome. The player can choose when to go to the next dialogue screen or else put the game on autoplay and just sit back and enjoy, analogous to listening to a CD or watching a DVD movie. The majority of KineticNovel's products contain adult material of a sexual nature, though all-ages products are produced as well, such as Key's Planetarian: The Reverie of a Little Planet.

The company gets most of its sales via offering its products for download over the Internet. However, there are instances where kinetic novels will be ported to consumer consoles, as with what occurred with Planetarian when it was ported to the PlayStation 2 by Prototype. After over three years since the last kinetic novel was produced in April 2006, the VisualArt's brand Issue produced a new kinetic novel, Meitantei Shikkaku na Kanojo, on August 28, 2009.

== Kinetic novels ==
- Planetarian: The Reverie of a Little Planet, released November 29, 2004 by Key
- Maiden Halo, released January 7, 2005 by Giant Panda.
- Kare to Kare no Hazama De ~White Labyrinth~, released February 14, 2005 by Amedeo
- Trance Kiss, released March 28, 2005
- Shinkyoku Sōkai Polyphonica, released August 8, 2005 by Ocelot
- Kare to Kare no Hazama De Saikon Kazoku Hen, released February 13, 2006 by Amedeo
- Fushigi no Kuni no Kanojo, released March 6, 2006 by Saga Planets
- Beni Hime, released April 3, 2006
- Meitantei Shikkaku na Kanojo, released August 28, 2009
