= Key (company) =

Japanese visual novel studio

- Type: Brand of Visual Arts
- Industry: Computer games
- Genre: Eroge (Note: Only Kanon, Air, Tomoyo After: It's a Wonderful Life, Little Busters! Ecstasy and Kud Wafter were originally released with adult content.); visual novels
- Founded: July 21, 1998; 28 years ago in Osaka, Japan
- Founders: Itaru Hinoue; Naoki Hisaya; Jun Maeda; Shinji Orito
- Headquarters: Kita, Osaka, Japan
- Area served: Japan
- Key people: Jun Maeda; Shinji Orito; Na-Ga
- Products: Kanon; Air; Clannad; Full list
- Website: key.visualarts.gr.jp

Key is a Japanese visual novel studio known for making dramatic and plot-oriented titles. It was formed on July 21, 1998, as a brand under the publisher Visual Arts, and is located in Kita, Osaka.

Key's debut visual novel Kanon (1999) combined an elaborate storyline, up-to-date anime-style art, and a musical score which helped to set the mood for the game. Key's second game, Air (2000), had a similarly complex storyline to Kanon and a more thorough gameplay. Both Kanon and Air were originally produced as adult games, but this trend was broken with Key's third title Clannad (2004), released for all ages. Key has released 18 visual novels to date, the latest being Anemoi (2026). Key has worked in the past with Interchannel and Prototype for the consumer port releases of the brand's games. Key has collaborated with P.A. Works and Aniplex to produce three original anime series: Angel Beats! (2010), Charlotte (2015), and The Day I Became a God (2020). The crossover anime series Kaginado premiered in 2021. The multimedia project Prima Doll includes an anime series that aired in 2022, and a four-volume visual novel series.

Co-founder Jun Maeda is a prominent figure in the brand, having contributed to the planning, scenario, and music composition in the majority of Key's visual novels. Na-Ga, Key's main artist, mainly worked with background art in earlier games, but with Key's sixth game Little Busters! (2007) was given the position of co-art director with former Key artist Itaru Hinoue. Shinji Orito, Key's main composer and another co-founder, has composed music for the majority of Key's titles.

Key has been an active participant at the Comiket convention since Comiket 57 in 1999, where they sold Kanon-related products; Key's latest appearance at Comiket was at Comiket 99 in 2021. In 2001, Visual Arts created the record label Key Sounds Label to release music albums and singles with music related to Key's visual novels. Between 2007 and 2010, Key produced an Internet radio show called Key Net Radio in regard to the brand.

== History ==
Visual novel release timeline
1999	Kanon
2000	Air
2001
2002
2003
2004	Clannad
2004	Planetarian: The Reverie of a Little Planet
2005	Tomoyo After: It's a Wonderful Life
2006
2007	Little Busters!
2008	Little Busters! Ecstasy
2009
2010	Kud Wafter
2011	Rewrite
2012	Rewrite Harvest festa!
2013
2014
2015	Angel Beats! 1st Beat
2016	Harmonia
2017
2018	Summer Pockets
2019
2020	Summer Pockets Reflection Blue
2021	Loopers
2021	Planetarian: Snow Globe
2021	Lunaria: Virtualized Moonchild
2022	Stella of The End
2023	Prima Doll: Fuyuzora Hanabi / Sekka Monyō
2024	Prima Doll: Mumei Tenrei
2025	Kōsai Toshi: Augment Protocol
2026	Anemoi

Before forming Key, the founding members worked for another visual novel development company called Nexton under the brand Tactics. At the time of Dōsei's production, Tactics' first game, four of Key's original staff worked on the game: Itaru Hinoue as art director, Shinji Orito as musical composer, and Miracle Mikipon and Shinory contributing to the computer graphics. After Dōsei, the rest of Key's founding staff—Naoki Hisaya, Jun Maeda and OdiakeS—joined Tactics and contributed to two more games: Moon released on November 21, 1997, and One: Kagayaku Kisetsu e released on May 29, 1998. Due to differing opinions between Nexton and most of the production staff in Tactics on how to produce the brand's next game, most of Tactics' staff left Nexton to pursue work in another publishing company where they could have the freedom to produce their next game.

Itaru Hinoue, who had previously worked at Visual Arts once before, introduced Key's founding members to the president of Visual Arts, Takahiro Baba. Baba gave the developers the freedom they desired, and they officially transferred to Visual Arts where they formed Key on July 21, 1998. With the production of Key's debut title Kanon still in its early stages, a brand name had still not been decided on by the developers. The tentative brand name was Azurite (アズライト, Azuraito) at first, but Jun Maeda was not pleased with this and wanted a name that would capture the image of the brand. Maeda came upon the name Key when he saw it on a sign for a musical instrument store he would always pass on his way to work and instantly liked the name. The name Key for the studio was ultimately decided by majority rule. Key released Kanon on June 4, 1999, as an adult game, though the scenes containing adult content were kept to a minimum. This gave the player more of a focus on the characters' stories and on the visuals and music, especially for a visual novel at the time of its release. A year later, on September 8, 2000, Key released their second game Air, which was also an adult game and similar in storytelling to Kanon.

Key's third game Clannad is a visual novel similar to Key's previous games, but contains no adult content. Clannad was meant to be released in 2002, but was delayed, leading to the game finally being released on April 28, 2004. Seven months after Clannad's release, Key released their shortest game, Planetarian: The Reverie of a Little Planet, on November 29, 2004 with a rating for all ages. Planetarian, in contrast to Key's past games, is a linear visual novel that does not require the user to make choices during gameplay; this is what is referred to as a kinetic novel. The brand's fifth game is Tomoyo After: It's a Wonderful Life, an adult game and spin-off of Clannad released on November 25, 2005, which expanded on the scenario of the heroine Tomoyo Sakagami from Clannad. Key released their sixth game, Little Busters!, on July 27, 2007 with no adult content, but released another version of the game entitled Little Busters! Ecstasy on July 25, 2008, with added adult content, story, and visuals.

In commemoration of Key's ten-year anniversary, Key and Visual Arts held a two-day event between February 28 and March 1, 2009, called "Key 10th Memorial Fes: Ano Hi kara Hajimatta Bokura no Toki o Kizamu Uta" (～あの日から始まった僕らの時を刻む唄～). Key collaborated with P.A. Works and Aniplex to produce the anime series Angel Beats! that aired between April and June 2010. Key's eighth game Kud Wafter was released on June 25, 2010, as an adult spin-off of Little Busters!, which expanded on the scenario of the heroine Kudryavka Noumi from Little Busters! and Ecstasy. Key released their ninth game Rewrite on June 24, 2011, with a rating for all ages, and an all ages fan disc to Rewrite titled Rewrite Harvest festa! was released on July 27, 2012. In commemoration of Key's 15-year anniversary, the visual novel adaptation Angel Beats! 1st Beat was released on June 26, 2015. Key again collaborated with P.A. Works and Aniplex to produce the anime series Charlotte that aired between July and September 2015. Key released the kinetic novel Harmonia on September 23, 2016, and it was available in English before its Japanese release on December 29, 2016. Key released the visual novel Summer Pockets on June 29, 2018; an expanded version titled Summer Pockets Reflection Blue was released on June 26, 2020. Key collaborated for a third time with P.A. Works and Aniplex to produce the anime series The Day I Became a God that aired between October and December 2020.

Key announced the development of three kinetic novels in October 2020: Loopers, Lunaria: Virtualized Moonchild, and Stella of The End. Loopers was released on May 28, 2021. Lunaria: Virtualized Moonchild was released on December 24, 2021. Stella of The End was released on September 30, 2022. Key also revealed in October 2020 the multimedia project Prima Doll in collaboration with plastic model and figurine manufacturer Kotobukiya. A 12-episode anime television series for Prima Doll aired between July and September 2022. Key released the Planterian Ultimate Edition on September 3, 2021, which also included Planetarian: Snow Globe, a kinetic novel version of the previously released prequel short story of the same name. Key collaborated with video game developer Wright Flyer Studios to produce the mobile role-playing game Heaven Burns Red released on February 10, 2022, for iOS and Android devices. A four-volume kinetic novel series for Prima Doll began with volume one released on April 28, 2023. Volume two will be released on May 31, 2024. Key announced a new visual novel named Anemoi on November 15, 2023. A new kinetic novel titled Kōsai Toshi: Augment Protocol (虹彩都市 augment protocol) set for release in 2024 was announced on December 15, 2023.

=== Key Sounds Label ===
In 2001, Visual Arts created the record label Key Sounds Label (KSL). The music albums and singles released by Key after this were put under this label, meaning that this does not include the first two albums and one single which were released before it was officially formed. The first album on this label was Humanity..., though the only direct connection to Key's works is that it contains a remixed version of the opening theme to Air. The albums under the label are mainly composed by Key's signature composers: Jun Maeda, Shinji Orito and Magome Togoshi. Three of the singles feature songs sung by Lia and one album, Love Song, features the singer Riya from Eufonius. Three drama CDs have been released as well.

To celebrate Key's ten-year anniversary, Key hosted a concert called KSL Live World 2008: Way to the Little Busters! EX on May 10, 2008, in Tokyo, Japan, and again on May 17, 2008, in Osaka, Japan. Each time, the concert lasted for two and a half hours and featured songs sung by Lia, Rita, Chata, and Tomoe Tamiyasu who have previously sung songs for singles and albums released under Key Sounds Label. Another concert called KSL Live World 2010: Way to the Kud-Wafter was held in Tokyo between May 21–22, 2010. A third content called KSL Live World 2013: Way to the Little Busters! Refrain was held in Koto, Tokyo on September 16, 2013. A fourth concert called KSL Live World: Way to the Angel Beats! -1st- was held in Akihabara, Tokyo on April 11 and April 12, 2015. A fifth concert called KSL Live World 2016: The Animation Charlotte & Rewrite was held in Toyosu, Tokyo on April 30, 2016.

=== Key Net Radio ===
Key produced 30 episodes of an Internet radio show called Key Net Radio (Keyらじ, Key Raji) in regard to the brand between December 13, 2007 and August 30, 2010. It was hosted by Shinji Orito and Itaru Hinoue of Key, and another woman named Chiro who works for Pekoe, another visual novel studio under Visual Arts. Listeners could submit thoughts about the show and any requests they may have for the show, along with submitting questions to the host trio. The broadcasts were available via download on Key's official website and were available for download on the radio show's official blog for the first nine broadcasts. The broadcasts could also be listened to on Visual Arts' YouTube channel named Visual Channel.

For the first six episodes, the show had five corners, or parts, which started with opening greetings from the hosts and went on to thoughts and impressions that listeners had about the show. This moved on to an informal talk between the hosts, followed by a section where entries previously submitted by listeners concerning their enthusiasm for Key were read by the hosts. The fourth corner concerned answering questions that had been submitted by listeners, and the final corner had Orito playing the flute; listeners could submit suggestions for songs he was to play. Two more corners were added starting with the seventh broadcast. The first corner added concerns scary stories that the hosts can tell themselves, or read from submissions by listeners, and was added partly because Hinoue enjoys such stories. The second corner added deals with submissions by listeners describing a new fictional character, and Hinoue takes these submissions and forms a new fictional character out of combining elements from multiple submissions together. During the broadcasts, tracks from the soundtracks released under Key Sounds Label play in the background.

=== Comiket involvement ===
Comiket, short for Comic Market, is a large comic convention held twice a year in Tokyo, Japan during August and December, which are referred to as the summer and winter Comic Markets, respectively. Key has been an active participant in the convention since Comiket 57 in December 1999, where they sold Kanon-related products (as Kanon was their only release at the time); one such product was a Zippo lighter. The first Air-related products Key sold at the convention were at Comiket 59 in December 2000. Typical products include: postcards, telephone cards, calendars, posters, and albums. The products Key sells at Comiket are all related to the visual novels the brand produces.

Key, through Visual Arts, generally participates at the winter Comiket in conjunction with other brands under Visual Arts, but has been known to appear at the summer Comiket too, such as with Comiket 70 in August 2006 where they sold Planetarian: The Reverie of a Little Planet related products. The combined total of the products Key sells at a given Comiket range in price between 3,000 and 5,000 yen. This includes the selling of music albums released under Key's record label Key Sounds Label which has been releasing albums since Comiket 60 in August 2001 with the release of the label's first two albums, Humanity... and "Natsukage / Nostalgia". If there are any unsold products by the end of a given Comiket, Visual Arts has been known to set up an online mail order to sell the remaining goods from all the brands under Visual Arts that participated at Comiket. After Comiket 73 in December 2007, Visual Arts started taking mail orders on March 4, 2008, and only six days later on March 10, 2008, Key reported that all of Key's goods sold at Comiket 73 were now sold out. At the end of the second day of Comiket 75 in December 2008, all of Key's goods at the convention were sold out.

== Staff ==
=== Main ===
Key's main staff members are attached to the visual novel studio, and therefore Visual Arts. One of the founding members of Key, Jun Maeda, has worked on the planning for the individual projects and was one of the main scenario writers; he has also composed music for the majority of Key's games. Maeda stepped down as the main scenario writer after Little Busters! Ecstasy, but continues to work on the music for Key's games. However, Maeda designed the Angel Beats! 1st Beat visual novel and partially wrote its scenario, in addition to providing the original concept for Summer Pockets. Na-Ga, Key's main artist, mainly worked with background art in earlier games, but was first given the position of co-art director with former Key artist Itaru Hinoue with Little Busters!. Further computer graphics have been provided in the past by Shinory and Mochisuke, two graphic artists in Key. Shinji Orito, another founding member and Key's main composer, has composed music for the majority of Key's games.

=== Former and outsourced ===
Many of Key's staff have left the brand over time, or have been employed as outsourced contributors. Naoki Hisaya had worked as one of the main scenario writers for Kanon, but once the project was complete, he left the brand. Another member of the staff that made Kanon was OdiakeS, an outsourced composer who has since helped Key with two music albums, one each released for Air and Clannad, but has done nothing with Key since 2004. Three staff members only worked with Key on Air: Takashi Ishikawa as one of the scenario writers, Tomotaka Fujii as a scenario assistant, and Din as a background artist. Air and Clannad had Tōya Okano and Kai who contributed as scenario writers. Kai later headed the planning of Kud Wafter, as well as contributing on the scenario of Angel Beats, Harmonia and Summer Pockets. One of the original computer graphics artists, Miracle Mikipon, left after Clannad. Two other outsourced graphic artists, Minimo Tayama and Torino, have often contributed on Key's games. Scenario writer Yūichi Suzumoto worked with Key between Air and Planetarian. Eeji Komatsu worked as the art director for Planetarian, and another artist, Fumio, worked as the art director for Tomoyo After.

Leo Kashida worked as an outsourced writer with Key on Tomoyo After, Little Busters! and Angel Beats. Chika Shirokiri, another outsourced writer who worked with Key on Little Busters!, also wrote the scenario for Kud Wafter. Manack and members of PMMK composed music in Little Busters!, and members of MintJam helped with arrangement. Magome Togoshi had been with Key since before Kanon's release, working as one of the signature composers, but left the brand in October 2006 after contributing to the soundtrack of Little Busters!. Jun'ichi Shimizu composed all the music in Kud Wafter. Two outsourced writers worked on the scenario for Rewrite and its fan disc Rewrite Harvest festa!: Ryukishi07 of 07th Expansion, and Romeo Tanaka. Rewrite and Harvest festa! also featured three outsourced musical composers: Maiko Iuchi of I've Sound, Sōshi Hosoi, and Ryō Mizutsuki. Mizutsuki later returned to compose music for Harmonia and Summer Pockets. At the time Maeda stepped down as the main scenario writer, Yūto Tonokawa joined Key and first worked on the scenario in Little Busters!. Tonokawa later contributed to the scenario in Rewrite and Harvest festa!, but resigned from Key in 2015. Itaru Hinoue, one of Key's founding members, was Key's main artist and was the sole art director and character designer for six of Key's games. Hinoue resigned from Key in September 2016 after working on Harmonia.

== Impact ==
A promo character card of Yumemi Hoshino from Planetarian: The Reverie of a Little Planet from the Lycèe Trading Card Game

According to Satoshi Todome's work, A History of Adult Games, Key's impact on the visual novel (primarily the adult game variant) world stems from before Key was formed and most of the founding members of Key worked for Tactics under Nexton. Due to an influence by Leaf's visual novel To Heart released in 1997, the developers at Tactics created a simple formula for a game: a comedic first half with a heart-warming romantic middle followed by a tragic separation and finally an emotional reunion formed what is known as a "crying game" or "nakige". The main purpose of such a game is to make the player feel for the characters and make them cry due to emotional scenarios which serves to leave a bigger impact on the player after the game is over. Tactics' second title One: Kagayaku Kisetsu e was created based on this formula.

After One was complete, the development team quit Tactics to form Key where they developed their first title Kanon also based upon this formula. Kanon was "heavily hyped [and] had gamers impatient until its release. It was only one game released by Key so far, and yet [it] had already sent major shockwaves around the industry. And yet another game [Air], two years later, sent even more shockwaves. Air was equally hyped and well received." The success of One and Kanon on Key's formula to create a "crying game" was later adopted by other visual novel developing companies which were influenced by this formula. Examples of this include: Kana: Little Sister by Digital Object, the Memories Off series by KID, D.C.: Da Capo by Circus, Snow by Studio Mebius (also under Visual Arts), and Wind: A Breath of Heart by Minori.

Ryukishi07 of 07th Expansion wrote in 2004 how he was influenced by Key's works during the planning of Higurashi no Naku Koro ni. Ryukishi07 played Key's games as a reference, among other visual novels, and analyzed them to figure out the reason why they were found to be so popular. He figured that the secret was due to how the stories would start with ordinary, enjoyable days, but then a sudden occurrence would happen leading the player to cry due to the shock value. He used a similar model for the basis of Higurashi but instead of leading the player to cry, Ryukishi07 wanted to scare the player with the addition of horror elements. In this way, Ryukishi07 wished to be in some way associated with Key who he described as a "masterpiece maker".

Key is one of 17 brands under Visual Arts with games included in the Lycèe Trading Card Game published by Broccoli. Characters from Key's first five games through Tomoyo After were included in the first three out of four Visual Arts card sets, and characters from Little Busters! through Rewrite were featured in the fifth through seventh Visual Arts card sets. There are also numerous rare promotional cards with characters from Key titles. Other big-name visual novel companies included in the card game include: AliceSoft, August, Leaf, Navel, and Type-Moon.

=== Leaf, Key BBS ===
A bulletin board system (BBS) based on the interface of the large Japanese Internet forum 2channel (2ch) was formed on January 26, 2000, named "Leaf, Key BBS" (leaf,key掲示板, leaf,key Keijiban), otherwise nicknamed as "Leaf-Key Board" (葉鍵板, Ha-Kagi Ita). The board originated from 2ch's video game discussion board due to a dispute involving the game Kizuato in December 1999; Kizuato was an early game of another visual novel producing brand named Leaf. Ultimately, fans of the game moved to 2ch's adult game board, but there was not much resolution, and at the time Key fans on the board were being shunned for discussions on Kanon and, at the time, Key's upcoming game Air. This resulted finally with the Leaf and Key fans moving away from 2ch and forming again on the PINKchannel Internet forum. The board serves as a discussion board for anything related to Leaf and Key. This includes the games the companies produce, but also the companies themselves and the staff that make up those companies. The BBS gets approximately 900 posts per day as of March 2010. Like 2ch, the board has a default anonymous posting setting, and the default name is "Nanashi-san Dayomon" (名無しさんだよもん; lit. "Mr. Nameless-dayomon"), a reference to the heroine Mizuka Nagamori from One: Kagayaku Kisetsu e who frequently ends her sentences with "dayo" and "mon".
