= Heaven Burns Red =

2022 video game

- Promotional image featuring Ruka Kayamori
- Developers: Wright Flyer Studios; Key
- Publishers: JP: Wright Flyer Studios, Key; WW: Yostar
- Artist: Yuugen
- Writer: Jun Maeda
- Composer: Jun Maeda
- Engine: Unity
- Platforms: iOS; Android; Windows
- Release: iOS, Android: JP: February 10, 2022; Windows: JP: August 10, 2022; iOS, Android, Windows: WW: November 15, 2024
- Genre: Role-playing
- Mode: Single-player

Heaven Burns Red (ヘブンバーンズレッド, Hebun Bānzu Reddo) (stylized in block capitals) is a free-to-play role-playing video game co-developed by WFS, Inc. and Key. It was released on February 10, 2022, for iOS and Android in Japan, and worldwide by Yostar in November 15, 2024. Jun Maeda, of Little Busters!, served as the main scenario writer. It was also released on Windows.

== Gameplay ==
Ruka Kayamori interacts with other characters (top); a battle in Heaven Burns Red (bottom)

The player takes the point of view of Ruka Kayamori, a former vocalist and guitarist for now-disbanded legendary band "She Is Legend". The game has a day-to-day system in which the player starts as newly enrolled Ruka Kayamori, meeting new characters as the story progresses. Monthly events take place within the game in the form of side stories, told from other characters' perspectives.

Heaven Burns Red is a turn-based role playing game in which the player can assemble a team of six out of 48 available girls and fight against extraterrestrial beings known as Cancer. During their turn, the player can choose three characters from the party to perform an action (attack, heal, etc.). Both characters and Cancer are equipped with Deflectors (DF) which work as a shield and can also be healed; characters' HP cannot be healed if their DF breaks and will be left vulnerable, though some characters have the skill to heal a broken DF. The game's story is told in a visual novel style, fully voiced. There is also a "Sixth Sense Mode".

== Plot ==
Heaven Burns Red is set in a world where the Earth is under attack by extraterrestrial life forms called "Cancer". Cancer are immune to conventional weapons and have forced humanity to abandon most of the Earth's surface. Facing extinction, humanity created weapons called "Seraphs" to fight Cancer, and organized the "Seraph Corps" of individuals who could wield them. One of them is Ruka Kayamori, who finds herself thrown into the war against Cancer.

== Development ==
In October 2019, it was announced that Jun Maeda was collaborating with Wright Flyer Studios and Key on Heaven Burns Red. Initially planned to be released in 2020, the game had been delayed to 2021, and subsequently to February 2022. Yuugen served as main visual illustrator and character designer, alongside Na-Ga, Fumuyun, and Maroyaka. Maeda also serves as composer. Nagi Yanagi performed the main theme and insert songs, while Rionos performed the ending theme.

=== Collaboration event ===
As part of the game's 1st anniversary campaign, the game collaborated with Jun Maeda's other franchise, Angel Beats!. The event titled "Place Where The Cosmos Continued to Bloom" (コスモスが咲き続けた場所, Kosumosu ga Sakitsuzuketa Basho) was available from February 2, 2023, and featured 3 of the franchise's characters: Yuri Nakamura, Kanade Tachibana, and Miyuki Irie. In the collaboration story, Unit 31A found themselves in an unfamiliar place, which turned out to be the underground base of the SSS, however they could still use their Seraph weapons. Players were able to obtain SS Style Yuri and Kanade through a limited-time gacha, whilst S Style Miyuki was obtainable through exchanging event tokens.

== Release ==
Heaven Burns Red released on February 10, 2022, for iOS and Android devices. Yostar later announced during the 2024 Anime Expo that it would release the game worldwide later in the year.

The game was released worldwide on November 15, 2024 for iOS, Android and Windows via a separate client.

== Other media ==
A 4-panel manga adaptation illustrated by Yū Tsurusaki began serialization on Kadokawa Corporation's G's Channel website and on the game's official Twitter account in Q4 2023.
