= Jun Maeda =

Japanese screenwriter, lyricist, and composer (born 1975)

- 麻枝 准
- Born: January 3, 1975 (age 51); Mie Prefecture, Japan
- Occupations: Author, composer, lyricist, manga author
- Writing career
- Genres: Drama, fantasy, romance
- Notable works: Kanon, Air, Clannad, Little Busters!, Angel Beats!, Charlotte, Summer Pockets, The Day I Became a God, Heaven Burns Red

Jun Maeda (麻枝 准, Maeda Jun; born January 3, 1975) is a Japanese writer and composer. He is a co-founder of the visual novel brand Key under Visual Arts. He is considered a pioneer of nakige visual novels, and has mainly contributed as a scenario writer, lyricist, and musical composer for the games the company produces.

After graduating with a degree in psychology from Chukyo University, Maeda contributed to the scripts and scores of games released under the Tactics brand of Nexton: Moon and One: Kagayaku Kisetsu e. He has contributed both to writing music and scripts to most games released under the Key brand, notably writing the majority of Air and Clannad. He also served as a screenwriter and composer for several anime series produced by P.A. Works, such as Angel Beats! and Charlotte.

== Early life ==
Jun Maeda started writing during elementary school, when he wrote his first amateur gamebook. Maeda was initially inspired by the Grailquest series of gamebooks by J.H. Brennan, especially the first two books in the series The Castle of Darkness and The Den of Dragons. Through junior-high school, Maeda worked on the school newspaper and even had some short stories published in the paper. Once attending Mie high school, he started to write lyrics and compose music. It was at this time that he became immersed in the fantasy genre of fiction. While attending Chukyo University, Maeda managed to get some short stories published in Kadokawa Shoten's light novel magazine The Sneaker. Finally, when he was writing his graduation thesis, he started listening to techno music.

== Career ==
While still attending university, Maeda sought to begin working as a musical composer for video games, and desired to work at big-name companies like Nihon Falcom Corporation, Namco, and Capcom, but he was unsuccessful. He eventually was able to land an interview with video game developer TGL, but could not supply correct documentation, and did not get the job. As he was unable to find employment working with music, Maeda decided to change his chosen occupation to scenario writer for a video game company. In the mid-1990s, scenario writing for consumer video games was not a very developed field, so Maeda decided to shoot for adult games instead. During a period of one month, Maeda wrote a long, 300-page erotic story, intending to sell it to an adult game developer. He first tried with AliceSoft, makers of the popular Rance series, but finally ended up working for the company Scoop. At Scoop in 1997, he was the main scenario writer for the company's first game, Chaos Queen Ryōko; however, he was not happy with the work environment and promptly filed his resignation from the company shortly after finishing his work on the scenario.

Around this time, Jun Maeda was inspired by Hiroyuki Kanno's pioneering 1996 eroge visual novel YU-NO: A Girl Who Chants Love at the Bound of this World. It demonstrated the storytelling potential of the visual novel medium, and influenced Maeda's later works. After leaving Scoop in 1997, Maeda went to work for the brand Tactics under the publisher Nexton. There, he helped create the visual novels Moon in 1997 and One: Kagayaku Kisetsu e in 1998. After these games were released, Maeda and much of the other staff who worked on the two visual novels left Tactics to form the company Key.

After forming Key, Maeda worked on the music and scenario for their first title Kanon released in 1999, which proved to be very popular in the adult game market in Japan. Beside Maeda, the majority of Kanon's scenario was written by Naoki Hisaya, but he quit Key shortly after Kanon was produced. Following this, Maeda wrote most of the scenario for Key's next title Air, along with again working as the lyricist and one of the composers for the music featured in the game. After a period of four years in 2004, Key released their third and longest game Clannad where Maeda did a vast amount of the writing for the game; in all, Maeda put in around 75% of the work that went into the creation of Clannad. Also in 2004, Maeda began writing his first manga entitled Hibiki's Magic, which was first conceived as a short story he wrote as a student. In 2005, Maeda worked on the scenario and music for Key's fifth game Tomoyo After: It's a Wonderful Life, followed by Key's sixth title Little Busters! released in July 2007 which he also worked on in regards to the scenario and music.

Maeda was reported to say in the February 2007 issue of Comptiq that after the completion of Little Busters!, he would not be working on the scenario staff for Key any longer. However, in an interview in the December 2007 issue of Dengeki G's Magazine, Maeda said that he would still be working on the music for Key's next game. In 2007, Maeda also composed the ending theme for the game Himawari no Chapel de Kimi to for the company Marron, and he was on the music staff for Ram's game 5 released in July 2008. Maeda worked in collaboration with Na-Ga and ASCII Media Works' Dengeki G's Magazine to the anime series and mixed media project Angel Beats! as the planner and writer, as well as composing the anime's music. Maeda worked on Key's ninth game Rewrite with the composition of the game's music and as the quality checker.

In 2015, Maeda designed and co-wrote the scenario for the Angel Beats! visual novel, as well as composing some of the game's music. Maeda once again collaborated with Na-Ga, Dengeki G's Magazine, P.A. Works, and Aniplex to produce his second anime series Charlotte in 2015, contributing as the planner, writer, and composing the anime's music. Maeda is credited for the original concept and the composition of the music for Key's visual novel Summer Pockets. Maeda collaborated with Na-Ga, P.A. Works, and Aniplex for a third time to produce the anime series The Day I Became a God in 2020, contributing as the planner and writer. In 2021, Maeda published his first novel, Nekogarizoku no Osa. In December of that year, Maeda posted a message on Twitter saying that he had considered hanging himself following poor reception and online harassment surrounding his The Day I Became a God series, and stated the following day that he would retire from writing stories for anime projects. He had previously deactivated all of his social media accounts earlier in the year for a similar reason. His most recent work, Heaven Burns Red, was released in Japan in February 2022 for iOS and Android. It is a turn-based role-playing game with visual novel and gacha game elements created in tandem with Wright Flyer Studios. Maeda deactivated his social media accounts for a second time following criticism of his writing quality on an event story within Heaven Burns Red.

== Writing themes ==
As is prevalent in the scenarios Maeda has written for visual novels, there are recurring themes related to the concept of a family and the bonds that hold it together. Most prevalent are the maternal bonds felt between a mother and daughter relationship, as can be seen strongly in Kanon, Air, and Clannad. However, in one of his earliest works, Moon, there was a conflict between the female protagonist and her late mother. Another recurring theme is that of magical realism, or adding fantastical elements into a story that would appear otherwise to be normal, such as with the concept of the illusionary world in Clannad, or the use of magic in Air and supernatural elements in Charlotte. Similarly, the concept of the switching between a real-life setting and the mystical Eternal World from One: Kagayaku Kisetsu e has been compared to Haruki Murakami's novel Hard-Boiled Wonderland and the End of the World, which uses a similar dichotomy between reality and fantasy.

After the production of Moon with its melancholic storylines, Maeda decided to shoot for what has later become known as a "crying game", starting with One: Kagayaku Kisetsu e. A crying game in this sense is a type of bishōjo game which can make the player cry for the characters, and thus give a more profound impact on the players. When working on Kanon with a similar goal, Maeda worked in depressing elements to the two heroines' stories he wrote for: Makoto Sawatari, and Mai Kawasumi.

== Musical involvement ==
Jun Maeda composes and writes lyrics for songs and background music featured in games he works on. At Nexton, he composed a single piece of music for Moon, but did not contribute to the music in One: Kagayaku Kisetsu e. At Key, Maeda has worked on the music for all of Key's titles except for Planetarian: The Reverie of a Little Planet and Rewrite Harvest festa!. He also composed and wrote the lyrics to the ending theme song for the Clannad anime series, and similarly for the opening theme song for the Clannad After Story anime series. Music that Maeda composes for Key titles is published on Key's record label Key Sounds Label. On the label, Maeda produced three singles and one album where he wrote and composed all the songs which include: "Natsukage / Nostalgia", "Birthday Song, Requiem", "Spica/Hanabi/Moon", and Love Song; the songs on the first three were sung by Lia and the fourth was sung by Riya.

Maeda wrote and composed the two songs "Doll", performed separately by Lia and Aoi Tada, and "Human", performed by Lia; both versions of "Doll" were used as the main ending theme songs for the second season of the anime series Gunslinger Girl in 2008, while "Human" was used for the final episode. Maeda's first involvement as a main composer was with the 2008 visual novel 5 by Ram where he composed about twenty background music tracks. Maeda also wrote and composed the opening and ending themes used in 5. Maeda formed his own record label named Flaming June in 2011, and the first release on the label is the single "Killer Song" by Nagi Yanagi released in December 2011. Flaming June released an original concept album with Yanagi on April 25, 2012 titled Owari no Hoshi no Love Song. Maeda released the concept album Long Long Love Song featuring Anri Kumaki on July 26, 2017. In 2021, Maeda wrote and composed one song for The Idolmaster Cinderella Girls: Starlight Stage titled "Beat of the Night", performed by Kaoru Sakura. Maeda wrote and composed the opening theme song for the 2022 anime series Prima Doll, titled "Tin Toy Melody".

== Personal life ==
In 2016, Maeda revealed that he was suffering from dilated cardiomyopathy, and that to recover from this condition, he would need a heart transplant.

On October 19, 2026, Visual Arts announced that Maeda had been diagnosed with pharyngeal cancer after he began to feel unwell in the spring of that year. After weighing his options, Maeda declined to pursue cancer treatment, opting for palliative care and devoting his energy to his work.
