= Harmonia (video game) =

2016 video game

- Cover featuring heroine Shiona
- Developer: Key
- Publisher: Visual Arts
- Director: Kai
- Artist: Itaru Hinoue
- Writers: Kai; Tsuzuru Nakamura
- Composers: Shinji Orito; Ryō Mizutsuki; Tomohiro Takeshita
- Platforms: Microsoft Windows, Nintendo Switch
- Release: September 23, 2016: Windows; WW: September 23, 2016; JP: December 29, 2016 Nintendo Switch; WW: October 20, 2022
- Genre: Visual novel
- Mode: Single-player

Harmonia is a Japanese post-apocalyptic visual novel developed by Key, a brand of Visual Arts. It was released on September 23, 2016 for Windows on Steam, and was available in English before its Japanese release on December 29, 2016. It was later ported to the Nintendo Switch. The story is set in a world where artificially intelligent, emotional androids called Phiroids were developed before a rapid decline in human civilization. An emotionless young man named Rei with a mechanical right hand is cared for by a girl in a small town as he gradually learns how to express emotions.

Like Key's 2004 game Planetarian: The Reverie of a Little Planet, Harmonia is defined as a "kinetic novel", since its gameplay offers no choices or alternate endings. Instead, the player proceeds through the story solely by reading. The story was written by Kai and Tsuzuru Nakamura, and character design was produced by Itaru Hinoue. The game's soundtrack was composed by Shinji Orito, Ryō Mizutsuki and Tomohiro Takeshita. Harmonia was described as providing an emotional impact despite its short length, but was said to not be as impactful as other titles developed by Key.

== Plot ==
=== Setting and gameplay ===
Harmonia is set in a post-apocalyptic world sometime in the future. A rapid decline in human civilization began once the population hit its peak of 10 billion, caused in part by pollution and war. During this time, artificially intelligent, emotional androids called Phiroids were developed to serve as partners for humans. Although Phiroids were originally powered by batteries for the first two generations, they were afterwards developed to be powered by eating food, making them nearly indistinguishable from humans. Artificial memories could also be implanted into the Phiroids, making them highly desirable, leading them to be produced in numbers that eventually rivaled the human population at a time when the birth rate was already in decline. Eventually, nuclear warfare and the resulting nuclear fallout killed off most of humanity, culminating in a world covered in dark clouds and ash blocking out sunlight, land stripped of vegetation, and an ocean that could no longer support life. Some people were placed in cryogenic facilities in an attempt to sleep long enough until the environment improved even a little bit.

Text in Harmonia is displayed in a dialog box, here depicting the player character talking with Shiona and Tipi (respectively).

Harmonia is a visual novel in which the player assumes the role of Rei. The gameplay is spent on reading the story's narrative and dialogue and follows a linear plot line; this is what Key refers to as a "kinetic novel". The text in the game is accompanied by character sprites, which represent who Rei is talking to, over background art. Throughout the game, the player encounters CG artwork at certain points in the story, which take the place of the background art and character sprites. Once the game is completed, a gallery of the game's CGs and background music becomes available on the title screen. The story takes place in a town with a stable water source that supports a small population. Frequented locations include the church where Rei and Shiona live, the library where Tipi lives, and the town plaza. The town also has various establishments, including a general store, a photo studio, and a bar. Although most of the town does not have electricity, there is a solar-powered battery in the library. On the outskirts of town, there is a ruined Phiroid factory next to the town dump.

=== Story ===
Harmonia begins when the protagonist Rei (レイ) wakes up in a derelict facility without any memories of who or where he is. Rei notices that his right hand is mechanical, and when he sees various Phiroids strewn about the facility, he assumes he is a Phiroid whose production went unfinished, as he also realizes that he does not have any emotions. Rei leaves the facility and walks several days to the outskirts of a town, where he is found by a girl named Shiona (シオナ; voiced by: Kaori Mizuhashi) who takes him back to the church where she lives and names him Rei. To pay Shiona back for her kindness, Rei sets out to repair a broken music box containing a song her brother had composed. Rei goes to the library to find a book to help in the repairs and meets the librarian, a little girl named Tipi (ティピィ; voiced by: Misaki Kuno) who is constantly sad. Once the music box is repaired, Shiona is able to sing to the tune in the town plaza while Rei plays the music box. With the help of the townspeople, Rei also repairs a projector to play a film directed by the son of Madd (マッド; voiced by: Kenta Miyake), the owner of the general store.

Rei finds a heavily injured man and races to try to save his life, but the man shortly dies after he brings him to the church. The whole town shows up to show their respects at the funeral. Worried about Tipi's state of mind in dealing with the man's death, Rei repeatedly tries to go see Tipi, but Shiona keeps preventing him from going to see her. Rei eventually makes it to the library, but Shiona merely tells Tipi that her parents, who she has been waiting to return, are dead and that she will always be alone. Enraged at Shiona's behavior, Rei gets her to leave the library and Rei stays with Tipi overnight. Rei and Tipi wake up the next morning to find that the town is under attack. When Rei leaves to investigate, he finds humans have infiltrated the town and are killing the townspeople. Rei is nearly killed by them, but Shiona protects him from a gunshot, which leaves her unconscious, but alive. Rei takes Shiona back to the library where they regroup with Tipi before leaving through the sewer system to make it back to the church. A lone man comes to the church, and while Rei is fighting him, the man uses a grenade, but Shiona protects Rei from the blast.

The aftermath of the blast makes Rei realize that he was human all along, and that everyone else in the town were Phiroids. After collecting some supplies, the three of them leave the town and make it to the facility where Rei originally woke up, which still has some electricity. Tipi gives Rei access to an electronic library on a tablet shortly before her battery is no longer able to function. Rei and Shiona stay in the facility for a time until Shiona eventually succumbs to the gunshot wound which had damaged her internal components. Rei puts Shiona and Tipi in cryogenic pods before leaving with the music box in an attempt to find a world where humans and Phiroids can coexist. Sometime later, Shiona wakes up in a facility with her memories wiped, but she is told that there was a music box with her when she was found. The environment has recovered and human civilization is once again prosperous and highly technological. Shiona is taken back to the town where humans and Phiroids once again coexist. She is reunited with Tipi, who also had her memories wiped. Prompted by the tune playing from the music box, Shiona sings the song which is now known worldwide.

== Development and release ==
Harmonia is directed by Kai, who also wrote the scenario with Tsuzuru Nakamura. In 2010, Nakamura had submitted a scenario titled Todoketai Melody (届けたいメロディ) to Visual Arts' Kinetic Novel Awards. Itaru Hinoue served as the art director and character designer, which marked her last contribution to Key before resigning in September 2016. At the time, she was most pleased with her art in Harmonia compared to her art in other games, especially with how she drew the faces of the characters. The game's soundtrack was composed by Shinji Orito, Ryō Mizutsuki and Tomohiro Takeshita. The game's theme song is "Todoketai Melody" (届けたいメロディ) by Ayaka Kitazawa, and the game also features the insert song "Towa no Hoshi e" (永遠の星へ) by Haruka Shimotsuki. A single containing both songs was released on April 11, 2015 by Key Sounds Label. Two music albums were released on May 26, 2017: Harmonia's original soundtrack and a piano remix album titled Teneritas.

Harmonia is Key's 12th visual novel and second "kinetic novel" after Planetarian: The Reverie of a Little Planet. It was announced in April 2015 to celebrate Key's 15th anniversary, and added to Steam Greenlight in October 2015, but this was followed by numerous delays. It was released on September 23, 2016 for Windows on Steam, and was available in English before its Japanese release on December 29, 2016 at Comiket 91. Although only a limited number of copies were sold at Comiket, Harmonia was released for general sale on May 26, 2017 in Japan. According to Visual Arts president Takahiro Baba, Harmonia was first released in English because he wanted to know how the game would be received worldwide before its release in Japan. Prototype released a Nintendo Switch port worldwide on October 20, 2022 with text support for Japanese, English and Chinese.

== Reception ==
Harmonia ranked at No. 20 in terms of national sales of PC games in Japan in May 2017. Marcus Estrada of Hardcore Gamer wrote that although Harmonia was not as "emotionally impactful" as other titles developed by Key, the game still achieved an emotional impact despite its short length. The CG artwork was described as beautiful and the sprites were also praised for emphasizing the "frailty of the characters and their world." However, Estrada felt that the English translation was "slightly off", with text that seemed less poetic than what might have been intended with its Japanese counterpart.
