= Shinji Orito =

Japanese composer (born 1973)

- Also known as: Gamma, Gunman
- Born: July 30, 1973 (age 53)
- Origin: Hyōgo, Japan
- Genres: J-pop, Techno
- Occupation: Composer
- Instruments: Keyboard, Synthesizer
- Years active: 1995–present
- Label: Key Sounds Label

Shinji Orito (折戸 伸治, Orito Shinji; born July 30, 1973) is a Japanese musical composer originally from Hyōgo, Japan working for the visual novel brand Key under VisualArt's. Before forming Key, Orito worked for another software company named Leaf where he contributed to four games. After leaving Leaf, Orito transferred to another company named Tactics where he had a hand in the creation of three games for that company: Dōsei, Moon, and One: Kagayaku Kisetsu e. After forming Key, Orito has put much work into such famous titles as Kanon, Air and Clannad. Orito has been influenced by the famous Japanese composers Joe Hisaishi and Yuzo Koshiro.

== Career ==
After graduating from high school, Orito worked at a bank, but due to a recession in the economy, the bank fell to restructuring, and Orito quit soon after. Orito found new work at a video game studio TGL composing music, but when a friend from high school, Naoya Shimokawa (now the president of Aquaplus) invited him to work for the visual novel studio Leaf, he accepted.

Starting in 1995, Orito composed music for three of Leaf's games: DR^{2} Night Janki, Filsnown: Hikari to Koku, and Shizuku (precursor of To Heart). When Leaf's next game, Hatsune no Naisho!!, was under production, Orito quit Leaf. Orito got a part-time job working for a post office while providing outsourced musical composition for the video game developer Tactics under Nexton for the game Dōsei; afterward, Tactics hired Orito, who helped compose music for two more games: Moon and One: Kagayaku Kisetsu e.

In 1999, Orito and much of the staff behind Moon and One, including Jun Maeda, Itaru Hinoue, Naoki Hisaya, and OdiakeS, left Tactics to work for the video game publishing company VisualArt's, where they formed the company Key. Orito has composed music for all of Key's titles, though he contributed to only one track on the original soundtrack of Planetarian: The Reverie of a Little Planet.

Music that Orito composes for Key is published on Key's record label Key Sounds Label. The label's first album, Humanity..., was produced by Orito for his temporary band Work-S. Orito was also the director for the remix album OTSU Club Music Compilation Vol.1, also on Key Sounds Label, and is a member of OTSU (Organized Trance Sequential Unit).

During his time at Key, Orito has provided outsourced musical composition for three games by three separate companies under VisualArt's. The first was for Sense Off by Otherwise, followed by Shoya Kinjō by Giant Panda, and finally Realize by Playm. In 2001, Orito composed the opening and ending themes for the anime series Please Teacher!. In 2006, Orito composed the song "Precious" on Mami Kawada's debut album Seed. Between December 2007 and August 2010, Orito was one of three personalities (the others being Itaru Hinoue and another woman named Chiro working for Pekoe, another visual novel studio under VisualArt's) on an internet radio show sponsored by Key in regards to the brand called Key Net Radio. Orito composed the music for Key's game Rewrite (2011) and its fan disc Rewrite Harvest festa! (2012). Orito released his album Circle of Fifth in October 2012. In 2016, Orito composed music for Key's game Harmonia.

Orito's musical roots are in producing dōjin music as a hobby. He used to visit a music BBS called Unison-BBS and named his dōjin circle Unison Label after the website, which has since gone offline. Many people were involved with the circle, which focused on a musical style similar to that featured in bishōjo games. The group was active between 1994 and 2000. During the time he worked with Tactics and later Otherwise, Orito was also a member of a professional group of composers known as the Unison Sound Team, in which he was known as either "Gamma" (がんま, Ganma) or "Gunman" (がんまん, Ganman).
