= Key Sounds Label =

Record label

- Parent company: Key
- Founded: 2001
- Founder: Visual Arts
- Distributor(s): Visual Arts, TuneCore
- Genre: J-pop, Video game music, New-age
- Location: Osaka, Japan
- Official website: http://key.soundslabel.com/

Key Sounds Label is a Japanese independent record label formed in 2001 as a brand of the publishing company Visual Arts. Key Sounds Label was formed to catalog and release music related to visual novels produced by the brand Key, also under Visual Arts, known for developing titles such as Kanon and Air. Excluding two albums and one single that were released by Key and Visual Arts' before the label's formation, the majority of releases on the label all have a basis from one of Key's titles. There are other albums and singles on the label not directly related to the visual novels, such as two singles by Lia and one album by Riya. Unlike typical record labels, Key Sounds Label does not license any of the artists featured on albums and singles released on the label.

When Key Sounds Label formed, Jun Maeda, Shinji Orito, and Magome Togoshi were Key's signature composers and have continued to produce the majority of the music on the label, though Togoshi is no longer affiliated with Key or VisualArt's. Key often sells albums and singles on this label at the convention Comiket. Key Sounds Label is not under contract with JASRAC, or any other Japanese copyright collecting agency. As such, the releases on the label are not sold in Japanese stores with other music albums and singles, but are still widely available for online purchase.

== History ==
Key Sounds Label has its origins in 1999, two years before the first album on the label was released. When the visual novel company Key, under the publisher Visual Arts, was about to release their debut title Kanon, Key produced the arrange album Anemoscope and bundled it with the first-print release of Kanon released in June 1999. The second music release, a single, occurred in November 1999. The third release, another arrange album, followed in September 2000 bundled with the first-print release of Key's second title Air, and was the first music release by Key to bear a catalog number, KYCD-0303. Each of these three were released in limited editions, and thus were not widely sold.

In 2001, Visual Arts and Key decided to form Key Sounds Label and start cataloging the albums and singles released by Key with the tag "KSLA–" followed by the four-digit label number. For example, the first release bears the catalog number KSLA-0001. The first two releases on the label were an album and a single released at the convention Comiket 60 in August 2001, and were sold by Key. Since then, Key has regularly sold singles and albums under Key Sounds Label at subsequent Comiket conventions. Following the convention established with Kanon and Air, Key has released three more arrange albums bundled with the first-print releases of Key's later titles Clannad, Little Busters!, and Little Busters! Ecstasy. These three albums were never re-released for general sale. In early 2008, three of the albums on the label became available through the iTunes Store—partial albums of -Memento- and Recollections, and the complete album Ma-Na—under the name Key Sound Team. Later, -Memento- was removed, and the full Recollections album became available.

Most of the releases on the label contain music directly related to Key's visual novels, whether they be original soundtracks, remix albums, or image song singles and albums. There are other music singles and albums produced by members of Key not related to Key's titles. For example, the first album released on the label, Humanity..., is the only album released by Work-S, a band produced by Shinji Orito. Two maxi singles containing songs sung by Lia were released on the label in December 2002 and August 2003. An album entitled Love Song was released in August 2005 containing songs sung by Riya of Eufonius. In December 2006, Key Sounds Label produced the first drama CD on the label, and two more followed in July 2007. In December 2006, the first anime music single to commemorate the second anime television series adaptation of Kanon was produced on the label, and an anime single for the Clannad anime television series followed in October 2007. A third anime music single, this time for the Clannad After Story anime television series, was released in November 2008. A short remix album for Clannad After Story was released in December 2008. Music singles and albums for the anime Angel Beats! were released between April and December 2010. A single for the Little Busters! anime television series was released in October 2012. Two singles for the Little Busters! Refrain anime television series were released: the first in October 2013 and the second in November 2013.

KSL Live World 2008 concert flyer.

The first EP on Key Sounds Label contained songs from Air and was only released during the first concert of the Japanese trance music group OTSU held in May 2006. The second EP contained songs from Little Busters! and was only released during the second OTSU concert held in May 2008. Both concerts were sponsored by Key Sounds Label, and both EPs were released on gramophone records. The first OTSU Club Music Compilation album primarily containing remixed music from Key's visual novels was released in June 2006. The second OTSU Club Music Compilation album was released in February 2008 as a promotion for the second concert, and contains remixed music from Little Busters!. The third OTSU release, OTSU:Blasterhead, contains remixed music from Key's visual novels and was released in February 2009.

=== Concerts ===
Key hosted a concert as a part of Key's tenth anniversary commemoration called KSL Live World 2008: Way to the Little Busters! EX which was held on May 10, 2008, in Tokyo, Japan, and again on May 17, 2008, in Osaka, Japan. Each time, the concert lasted for two and a half hours and featured songs sung by Lia, Rita, Chata, and Tomoe Tamiyasu who have previously sung songs for singles and albums released under Key Sounds Label. Tickets for the event were first available through mail order online on March 26, 2008. A two-CD remix album entitled KSL Live World 2008: Pamphlet and Memorial Disc was sold at both concert showings bearing the catalog numbers KSLC-0001—0002 and contains six remixed vocal versions of Kanon's opening theme "Last regrets" on the album's A-side; two of the tracks appeared on previous Key Sounds Label releases, and one is from the 1999 I've Sound compilation album Regret. The B-side of the album contains a recording of a group talk of the live performers from the concert. A live album containing the recording of the second concert held in Osaka was released in December 2008 entitled KSL Live World 2008: Way to the Little Busters! EX.

Another concert called KSL Live World 2010: Way to the Kud-Wafter was held in Tokyo on May 21, 2010 and again twice more on May 22, 2010. The concert featured songs sung by Keiko Suzuki, Miyako Suzuta, Aoi Tada, Tomoe Tamiyasu, Chata, Marina, Lia, LiSA, Rita and Eufonius; however, Eufonius only appeared at the May 22 concerts. The MCs at the concerts were Shinji Orito and Rita; Jun Maeda also made appearances at the concerts. Tickets for the event were first available through mail order online on March 30, 2010. A live album containing the recording of one of the May 22 concerts was released in December 2010 titled KSL Live World 2010: Way to the Kud Wafter.

A third concert called KSL Live World 2013: Way to the Little Busters! Refrain was held in Koto, Tokyo on September 16, 2013. The concert featured songs sung by Tomoe Tamiyasu, Keiko Suzuki, Rita, Suzuyu, Ayaka Kitazawa and Lia. Jun Maeda and Shinji Orito once again made appearances at the concert. A fourth concert called KSL Live World: Way to the Angel Beats! -1st- was held in Akihabara, Tokyo on April 11 and April 12, 2015. A fifth concert called KSL Live World 2016: The Animation Charlotte & Rewrite was held in Toyosu, Tokyo on April 30, 2016.

== Artists ==
Unlike typical record labels, Key Sounds Label does not license any of the artists featured on albums and singles released on the label. When Key Sounds Label formed, Jun Maeda, Shinji Orito, and Magome Togoshi were Key's signature composers and have continued to produce the majority of the music on Key Sounds Label. In October 2006, however, Togoshi left Key and is no longer affiliated with either Key or VisualArt's. One of the founding members of Key, OdiakeS, left Key before Key Sounds Label formed, but did contribute on the Kanon Original Soundtrack and the remixing of a song on Clannad's remix album -Memento-. Key Sounds Label's roster features Japanese bands and singers, several of which originated from the I've Sound techno/trance music production group under VisualArt's, such as Ayana, Kotoko, Lia, Mell, Mami Kawada and Eiko Shimamiya. Other artists including Annabel, Chata, Karuta, Ayaka Kitazawa, LiSA, Marina, Runa Mizutani, Psychic Lover, Rita, Riya, Harumi Sakurai, Haruka Shimotsuki, Keiko Suzuki, Miyako Suzuta, Suzuyu, Aoi Tada, Tomoe Tamiyasu, and Nagi Yanagi have also been released on records through the label. The musical units Work-S, Eufonius, OTSU, PMMK, and MintJam have also produced music on Key Sounds Label. Musicians from I've Sound have been working with Key Sounds Label on the arrangement of songs, as have many others.

== See also ==
- List of record labels
