= Visual Arts (company) =

Japanese video game publisher

- Company type: Subsidiary
- Industry: PC games Music
- Founded: March 26, 1991; 35 years ago
- Headquarters: Kita, Osaka, Japan
- Key people: Genki Tenkumo (executive director)
- Products: Visual novels
- Parent: Tencent (2023–present)
- Website: visual-arts.jp

Visual Arts (株式会社ビジュアルアーツ, Kabushikigaisha Bijuaru Ātsu), formerly Visual Artist Office (ビジュアルアーティストオフィス, Bijuaru Ātisuto Ofisu) and previously spelled in English as VisualArt's, is a Japanese publishing company which specializes in publishing and distributing visual novels for a large list of game developers. Visual Arts has developed game engines their brands currently use, including the current engine, called Siglus, and older engines RealLive and AVG32. Visual Arts also handles the distribution of these games. The games published are mostly for a male audience, though they also publish games targeted towards women as well. They are well known for publishing games developed by Key, such as Kanon, Air, and Clannad.

The company has coined a new type of visual novel called the kinetic novel where unlike in visual novels where the player is periodically given choices to make, there are no choices whatsoever and the player watches the game progress as if it were a movie. One of Key's games entitled Planetarian: The Reverie of a Little Planet was the first game produced under the kinetic novel name. In addition to games, Visual Arts also releases music CDs for video game music. Of special note among the artists sold under this label is I've Sound, a techno/trance music production group who was the first in the adult game industry to perform at the Nippon Budokan in October 2005.

Visual Arts is also involved with transplanting games they have previously published to be playable on mobile phones. Prototype manages this portion of Visual Arts known as Visual Arts Motto (ビジュアルアーツ★Motto, Bijuaru Ātsu★Motto). Visual Arts launched a web magazine called Visualstyle on October 26, 2007. Visual Arts launched a YouTube channel called Visual Channel in July 2008 where videos are posted which are related to the games and companies under Visual Arts. In October 2008, Visual Arts launched their VA Bunko light novel imprint, which includes light novels based on games produced by brands under Visual Arts.

Visual Arts' president Takahiro Baba announced retirement in July 2023, passing on his role to Genki Tenkumo (also known as Tōya Okano) and transferred his share to Tencent, making Visual Arts a child company of Tencent.

== Partner companies ==
The Visual Arts logo until 2019

=== Game brands ===
- 13 cm
- Amedeo
- Anfini
- B_Works
- Bonbee!
- Catwalk
- Concept
- Dress
- E.G.O.
- Elysion
- Flady
- Frill
- Garden
- G-clef
- Ham Ham Soft
- Hadashi Shōjo
- Hayashigumi
- Image Craft
- Issue
- Jidaiya
- Key
- KineticNovel
- Kur-Mar-Ter
- KuroCo
- Lapis Lazuli
- LimeLight
- Mana
- Miss Chifu
- Moe.
- Ningyou Yuugisya
- Ocelot
- OPTiM
- Pass Guard
- Pekoe
- Playm
- Radi
- Realdeal
- Rex
- Rio
- Saga Planets
- Sirius
- Spray
- Studio Mebius
- Tone Work's
- Visual Arts Scripts
- Zero
- Zion

=== Music related ===
- Cure Records
- fripSide
- I've Sound
- Key Sounds Label
- OTSU
- Queens Label

=== Defunct ===
- Akiko
- Akumi
- Craftwork
- Culotte
- D-XX
- Giant Panda
- Harvest
- Kamen Shōkai
- Manbō Soft
- Miyabi
- Otherwise
- Ram
- Tamachadō
- Words
