= Key Sounds Label discography =

Key Sounds Label is a Japanese independent record label based in Osaka, Japan, that specializes in trance music. The label formed in 2001 as a brand of the publishing company VisualArt's and was established to catalog and release music related to visual novels produced by the brand Key, also under VisualArt's. When Key Sounds Label formed, Jun Maeda, Shinji Orito, and Magome Togoshi were Key's signature composers and have continued to produce the majority of the music on the label, though Togoshi resigned in October 2006 and is no longer affiliated with Key or VisualArt's. Key and VisualArt's released one single and two remix albums between 1999 and 2000, leading to the formation of Key Sounds Label the following year. The first official releases on the label were Work-S' debut (and only) studio album Humanity... and Lia's debut single "Natsukage / Nostalgia" at the convention Comiket 60 in 2001. The first release to chart on Japan's Oricon charts was the Clannad Original Soundtrack released in 2004. Between 2006 and 2008, eight more releases—five singles and three albums—also charted on Oricon. The six singles and two albums released for the anime series Angel Beats! charted on Oricon in 2010.

Key Sounds Label's roster features Japanese bands and singers, several of which originated from the I've Sound techno/trance music production group under VisualArt's, such as Ayana, Lia, Mell, and Eiko Shimamiya. Other artists including Annabel, Chata, Eufonius, Karuta, LiSA, Marina, Runa Mizutani, Psychic Lover, Rita, Harumi Sakurai, Haruka Shimotsuki, Keiko Suzuki, Miyako Suzuta, Aoi Tada, Tomoe Tamiyasu, and Nagi Yanagi have also released records through the label. Key Sounds Label catalogs their releases on three indexes: KSLA/KSLM, KSLC and KSLV. The albums on KSLA/KSLM and KSLC are released on CD format, while video albums on KSLV are released on DVD and Blu-ray Disc.

== Catalog ==
=== Under Visual Arts ===
Year	No.	Artist	Title
1999	WIC-6435	Key feat. Ayana	Anemoscope
1999	WIC-6526	Key feat. Ayana	"Last regrets / Place of wind which arrives"
2000	KYCD-0303	Key feat. Lia	Ornithopter

=== Under Key Sounds Label ===
==== KSLA/KSLM ====
Year	No.	Artist	Title
2001	1	Work-S	Humanity...
2001	2	Lia	"Natsukage / Nostalgia"
2001	3	Key feat. Lia	Recollections
2002	4–5	Key feat. Lia	Air Original Soundtrack
2002	6	Key feat. Ayana	Kanon Original Soundtrack
2002	7	Lia	"Birthday Song, Requiem"
2003	8	Lia	"Spica/Hanabi/Moon"
2003	9	Riya	Sorarado
2003	10	Key	Re-feel
2004	11	Key feat. Eufonius	Mabinogi
2004	12–14	Key feat. Eufonius, Lia	Clannad Original Soundtrack
2004	15	Riya	Sorarado Append
2004	16–17	Key feat. Eufonius, Lia	-Memento-
2005	18	Key	Ma-Na
2005	19	Riya	Love Song
2005	20	Key feat. Lia	Tomoyo After Original Soundtrack
2005	21	Key	Piano no Mori
2006	22	Lia	Air Analog Collector's Edition^{[A]}
2006	23–24	OTSU feat. Ayana, Lia	OTSU Club Music Compilation Vol.1
2006	25	Key feat. Mell	Planetarian Original Soundtrack
2006	26	Ayana	"Last regrets / Kaze no Tadoritsuku Basho"
2006	27	—	Planetarian Drama CD "A Snow Globe"
2007	28	Rita	"Little Busters!"
2007	29	—	Planetarian Drama CD "Jerusalem"
2007	30–31	—	Planetarian Drama CD "Hoshi no Hito"
2007	32	Key feat. Rita	Semicrystalline.
2007	33–35	Key feat. Rita	Little Busters! Original Soundtrack
2007	36	Eufonius, Chata	"Mag Mell / Dango Daikazoku"
2007	37	Key feat. MintJam, Rita	Rockstar Busters!
2007	38	Tomoe Tamiyasu	"Rin no Hisoka na Koi no Uta / Mission:Love sniper"
2008	39–40	OTSU feat. Rita	OTSU Club Music Compilation Vol.2
2008	41	Rita	Little Busters! Analog Collector's Edition^{[B]}
2008	42	Key	Ontology
2008	43	Key feat. Lia, Rita	Little Busters! Ecstasy Tracks
2008	44	Lia	"Toki o Kizamu Uta / Torch"
2008	45–46	Chata, Lia, Rita, Tomoe Tamiyasu	KSL Live World 2008: Way to the Little Busters! EX
2009	47	Harumi Sakurai	"Saya no Nemureru Requiem / Saya's Song"
2009	48	OTSU feat. Blasterhead, Ayana, Lia, Rita	OTSU:Blasterhead
2009	49	Keiko Suzuki	"Raison / Pickles o Oishikusuru Tsukurikata"
2009	50	Tomoe Tamiyasu	"Neko to Garasu to Marui Tsuki / Alicemagic (Aroma Tablet mix)"
2010	51	Girls Dead Monster (Marina)	"Crow Song"
2010	52	Girls Dead Monster (LiSA)	"Thousand Enemies"
2010	53–54	Lia, Aoi Tada	"My Soul, Your Beats / Brave Song"
2010	55	Girls Dead Monster (LiSA)	"Little Braver"
2010	56	Miyako Suzuta	"One's Future"
2010	57	Jun'ichi Shimizu feat. Haruka Shimotsuki, Miyako Suzuta	Kud Wafter Original Soundtrack
2010	58	Girls Dead Monster (LiSA)	Keep The Beats!
2010	59–60	Jun Maeda, Anant-Garde Eyes feat. Karuta, Lia, Aoi Tada	Angel Beats! Original Soundtrack
2010	61–63	Chata, Marina, Lia, LiSA, Rita, Riya, Keiko Suzuki, Miyako Suzuta, Aoi Tada, Tomoe Tamiyasu	KSL Live World 2010: Way to the Kud Wafter
2010	64	Girls Dead Monster (Marina)	"Last Song"
2010	65	Girls Dead Monster (LiSA)	"Ichiban no Takaramono (Yui final ver.)"
2010	66	Key feat. Asari, Duca, Miyako Suzuta	Albina: Assorted Kudwaf Songs
2011	67	Runa Mizutani, NanosizeMir	"Philosophyz"
2011	68	Key feat. Lia, Rita, Haruka Shimotsuki, Miyako Suzuta	Deejay Busters!
2011	69	Psychic Lover	"Rewrite"
2011	70	Key feat. Annabel	Soil
2011	71	Lia	Key+Lia Best 2001–2010
2011	72	—	—
2011	73–75	Key feat. Runa Mizutani, NanosizeMir, Psychic Lover, Aoi Tada, Nagi Yanagi	Rewrite Original Soundtrack
2011	76	Key feat. Annabel, Mao, Nagi Yanagi	Branch
2011	77	Jun'ichi Shimizu feat. Haruka Shimotsuki, Miyako Suzuta	Kud Wafter Original Soundtrack
2011	78	Key feat. Asari, Duca, Miyako Suzuta	Albina: Assorted Kudwaf Songs
2012	79	Key feat. Hatsune Miku	Key+Vocaloid Best selection vol.1
2012	80	Chata, Mami Kawada, Ayaka Kitazawa, Kotoko, Lia, LiSA, Rita, Eiko Shimamiya, Aoi Tada, Kaori Utatsuki	Orpheus: Kimi to Kanaderu Ashita e no Uta
2012	81	Key feat. Runa Mizutani, NanosizeMir, Aoi Tada	Feast
2012	82–83	Shinji Orito feat. Ayana, Mami Kawada, Ayaka Kitazawa, Kotoko, Lia, Ray, Runa Mizutani, Rita, Nagi Yanagi	Circle of Fifth
2012	84	Key feat. Sōshi Hosoi	Keynote: Key Sounds Remix Album
2012	85–86	Key and VisualArt's	VisualArt's 20th Anniversary Remixes
2012	87–88	Rita	"Little Busters! / Alicemagic"
2012	90	Key feat. TAM, Ayana, Lia, LiSA, Runa Mizutani, Riya, Rita, Aoi Tada	Key Classic
2012	91	Key feat. MintJam, Runa Mizutani, Aoi Tada, Nagi Yanagi	Dye Mixture
2013	89	Key	Ripresa
2013	92	Suzuyu	"Boys be Smile / Mezameta Asa ni wa Kimi ga Tonari ni"
2013	93	Ayaka Kitazawa	"Kimi to no Nakushi Mono / Namidairo no Tsubasa"
2013	94	Key feat. Ayaka Kitazawa, Rita, Suzuyu	Little Busters! Refrain Original Soundtrack
2014	95–96	Ayaka Kitazawa, Lia, Rita, Harumi Sakurai, Keiko Suzuki, Suzuyu, Tomoe Tamiyasu	Little Busters! Perfect Vocal Collection
2014	97	Ayaka Kitazawa	Nature Couleur
2014	98	Girls Dead Monster (Marina)	Rare Tracks
2015	99	Lia, Suzuyu	"Heartily Song"
2015	100	Ayaka Kitazawa, Haruka Shimotsuki	"Todoketai Melody / Towa no Hoshi e"
2015	101	Girls Dead Monster (Marina)	"Million Star"
2015	102	Key	Holy
2015	103–104	Lia, Aoi Tada	"Bravely You / Yakeochinai Tsubasa"
2015	105	How-Low-Hello	"Rakuen Made / Hatsunetsu Days"
2015	106	Zhiend	"Trigger"
2015	107	How-Low-Hello	Smells Like Tea, Espresso
2015	108–109	Zhiend	Echo
2015	110–111	Jun Maeda, Anant-Garde Eyes feat. Lia, Aoi Tada, Anri Kumaki	Charlotte Original Soundtrack
2015	112	Key feat. Aoi Tada	Crann Mor
2016	113–115	Karuta, Lia, LiSA, Marina, Suzuyu, Aoi Tada	Angel Beats! Perfect Vocal Collection
2016	116	Key	Selene
2016	117	Ceui, Sayaka Sasaki	"Twinkle Starlight / Worlds Pain"
2016	118	Runa Mizutani	"Philosophyz / Sasayaka na Hajimari"
2016	119	Ayaka Kitazawa, Lia	"Hoshi no Fune / Gentle Jena"
2016	120	Anri Kumaki	"End of the World / Hetakuso na Uta"
2016	121	Aoi Tada	"Word of Dawn / Okiraku Kyūsai"
2016	122–123	Key feat. Ceui, Ayaka Kitazawa, Lia, Mell, Sayaka Sasaki	Planetarian Original Soundtrack
2016	124–126	Ayana, Ceui, Ayaka Kitazawa, Lia, LiSA, Marina, Runa Mizutani, Miyako Suzuta, Suzuyu, Aoi Tada, Maaya Uchida	Modification of Key Sounds Label
2016	127	Iku, Ayaka Kitazawa, Larval Stage Planning, Lily on the Field, Runa Mizutani, Rina, Suzuyu, Yuzuno	I've × Key Collaboration Album
2016	128	Risa Asaki, Saya Shinomiya	Pureness Rhapsody
2017	129	Maon Kurosaki	"Last Desire"
2017	130	Runa Mizutani	"Instincts"
2017	131	—	—
2017	132–133	Anri Kumaki	Long Long Love Song
2017	134	Key feat. Ayaka Kitazawa, Haruka Shimotsuki	Harmonia Original Soundtrack
2017	135	Key	Teneritas
2017	136–139	Key feat. Ayaka Kitazawa, Anri Kumaki, Maon Kurosaki, Runa Mizutani, Psychic Lover, Aoi Tada, Nagi Yanagi	Rewrite Original Soundtrack
2017	140	Key feat. Anri Kumaki, Maon Kurosaki, Runa Mizutani, Psychic Lover, Aoi Tada	Re:Change
2017	141	Ayaka Kitazawa	Emotional Blue
2017	142	Key feat. Ceui, Lia, Mell, Sayaka Sasaki	Planetarian Analog Collector's Edition
2017	143	Rita	Streak of Light
2017	144	Hyon	Hikikomori Songs
2017	145	Key feat. Ayaka Kitazawa, Lia, Rita	Humans Pleasure
2018	146	Konomi Suzuki	"Alkatale"
2018	147	Hyon	Hikikomori Songs
2018	148	Shōji Morifuji, Yūichirō Tsukagoshi	Swallow Tale
2018	149–151	Key feat. Runa Mizutani, Rionos, Konomi Suzuki, Yurika	Summer Pockets Original Soundtrack
2018	152	Emiri Iwai, Ayaka Kitazawa, Konomi Kohara, Tomomi Mineuchi, Natsumi Takamori, Yurika	Sing!
2018	153	Key	Summer Session: Hito Natsu no Bōken
2018	154	Ayaka Kitazawa	Ayaka Kitazawa Remix Collection
2018	155–159	—	Summer Pockets Drama CD Collection
2018	160	Hyon	"Dis-Love Song"
2019	161	Key feat. Emiri Iwai, Ayaka Kitazawa, Runa Mizutani, Rionos, Konomi Suzuki, Aimi Tanaka, Yurika	Seven's Sea
2019	162	Key	Echoes of Summer
2019	1001–1050	Key	Key BOX -for two decades-
2019	163–164	Chata, Karuta, Lia, Runa Mizutani, Rionos, Rita, Konomi Suzuki, Nagi Yanagi, Yurika	Key Best Selection 1999–2019
2019	165–167	Ayana, Ayaka Kitazawa, Lia, LiSA, Marina, Runa Mizutani, Rita, Riya, Sayaka Sasaki, Haruka Shimotsuki, Keiko Suzuki, Suzuyu, Natsumi Takamori, Tomoe Tamiyasu, Aimi Tanaka, Maaya Uchida, Yoffy, Yurika	Modification of Key Sounds Label Vol. 2
2020	168	Konomi Kohara, Konomi Suzuki	"Asterlore"
2020	169	Key feat. Runa Mizutani, Konomi Suzuki, Rita	Edain
2020	170	Key	Summer Chronicle
2020	171	Ayana, Ceui, Ayaka Kitazawa, Maon Kurosaki, Lia, Rita	Pop Sensation
2020	172	Key feat. Riko Azuna, Sayaka Sasaki, Keiko Suzuki	Planetarian: Snow Globe Original Sound Tracks & Voice Drama CD
2020	173	Runa Mizutani, Konomi Suzuki, Yurika	"Asterlore / Aoki Konata / Natsu no Sundadokei"
2020	174–175	Key feat. Ayaka Kitazawa, Haruka Shimotsuki, Suzuyu, Naomi Wakabayashi	Kud Wafter Original Soundtrack
2020	176	Nagi Yanagi	"Kimi to Iu Shinwa / Goodbye Seven Seas" (limited edition)
2020	177	Nagi Yanagi	"Kimi to Iu Shinwa / Goodbye Seven Seas"
2020	178	Nagi Yanagi	"Natsu Nagi / Takaramono ni Natta Hi"
2020	181	Eufonius, Tomomi Mineuchi, Runa Mizutani, Sayaka Sasaki, Haruka Shimotsuki, Miyako Suzuta, Suzuyu	Blow
2020	182	Key feat. Runa Mizutani, Rionos, Konomi Suzuki, Yurika	Summer Pockets Reflection Blue Original Soundtrack
2020	183	Ai Fairouz, Saku Ichimiya, Sahomi Koyama	Sing! 2
2021	179–180	Jun Maeda, Manyo, Anant-Garde Eyes feat. Nagi Yanagi	The Day I Became a God Original Soundtrack
2021	184	Key feat. Sana	Loopers Original Soundtrack
2021	185	Lia	"Chiisana Kiseki"
2021	186	Girls Dead Monster (LiSA, Marina)	"Awakening Song"
2021	187	Key feat. Tsukino	Lunaria: Virtualized Moonchild Original Soundtrack
2021	188	Key feat. Runa Mizutani, Aoi Tada	Forestia
2021	189–193	Key feat. Lia	Kaginado Original Soundtrack
2022	194	Key feat. Zero Aimiya, Rionos	Stella of The End Original Soundtrack
2022	195–199	Key feat. Lia	Kaginado Original Soundtrack Vol. 2
2022	200–201	Nagi Yanagi	Love Song from the Water
2022	202–207	Key	Heaven Burns Red Original Soundtrack Vol. 1
2022	208–209	Yurina Amami, Anju Inami, Aoi Koga, Ryōko Maekawa, Konomi Suzuki, Xai	Job for a Rockstar

==== KSLC ====
Year	No.	Artist	Title
2008	1–2	Key feat. Ayana, Lia, Eiko Shimamiya	KSL Live World 2008: Pamphlet and Memorial Disc
2008	3	Key	"Toki o Kizamu Uta / Torch" Piano Arrange Disc
2009	4–5	Key feat. Annabel, Kaori Furukawa, Takashi Kamijō, Kazue, Marie, Aya Sōma	Key 10th Memorial Fes Anniversary CD
2009	6–7	—	Key Net Radio Vol. 1
2010	8	Key feat. Chata, Lia, Rita, Keiko Suzuki, Miyako Suzuta	KSL Live World 2010: Pamphlet Music Disc
2010	9	Girls Dead Monster (LiSA)	Girls Dead Monster Starring LiSA Tour 2010 Live Pamphlet
2011	10–11	—	Key Net Radio Vol. 2
2012	12	Chata, Lia, Rita, Aoi Tada	"Shiawase ni Naru Ban"
2013	13	Key feat. Harumi Sakurai, Keiko Suzuki, Tomoe Tamiyasu	KSL Live World 2013: Pamphlet Music Disc
2015	14–15	Key feat. Lia, LiSA, Marina, Aoi Tada	Key 15th Fes. Pamphlet CD
2016	16–17	Key feat. How-Low-Hello, Lia, Runa Mizutani, Psychic Lover, Aoi Tada, Zhiend	Key Live World 2016: Pamphlet Disc
2017	18	Key feat. Ceui, Lia, Mell, Sayaka Sasaki	Planetarian Analog Collector's Edition DVD (Note: This DVD contained the music tracks in FLAC format.)
2018	19–20	Key feat. Takahiro Baba (MC), Ayaka Kitazawa, Lia, Marina, Runa Mizutani, Shinji Orito (discussion), Rita (discussion), Riya, Sayaka Sasaki, Aoi Tada (discussion)	KSL Live World 2018 Pamphlet CD
2018	21–29	—	—
2021	30–31	Key feat. Ayaka Kitazawa, Runa Mizutani, Riya, Sana, Haruka Shimotsuki, Konomi Suzuki, Suzuyu, Naomi Wakabayashi, Nagi Yanagi, Yurika	KSL online 2021: Kaginado
2021	32	Akari Kito, Tomori Kusunoki, Yuki Nakashima, Miyu Tomita, Azumi Waki	"Kikaijikake no Sanka / Usuhanazakura"
2021	33	Akari Kito, Tomori Kusunoki, Yuki Nakashima, Miyu Tomita, Azumi Waki	"Kikaijikake no Sanka / Usuhanazakura" (vinyl edition)

==== KSLV ====
Year	No.	Artist	Title
2011	1–3	Girls Dead Monster (LiSA)	Girls Dead Monster starring LiSA Tour 2010 Final: Keep The Angel Beats!
2013	4–6	Key, I've Sound	VisualArt's 20th Live 2012 in Yokohama Arena: Kimi to Kanaderu Ashita e no Uta
2017	7–8	Key	KSL Live World 2016: the Animation Charlotte & Rewrite Live Blu-ray
2020	9	Nagi Yanagi	"Kimi to Iu Shinwa / Goodbye Seven Seas" DVD

"—" denotes unassigned catalog numbers or releases not applicable to music artists.

== Notes and references ==
- ^{A} This album was released on the 12-inch format and was limited to 500 copies.
- ^{B} This album was released on the 12-inch format and was limited to 500 copies.

General

- "Key Sounds Label's discography" (in Japanese). Key Sounds Label.

Specific
