= List of KSL Live World albums =

KSL Live World discography
- Live albums: 2
- Remixes: 2

A concert titled KSL Live World hosted by the visual novel development brand Key under VisualArt's was held in 2008 and again in 2010. The first one, called KSL Live World 2008: Way to the Little Busters! EX, was held on May 10, 2008 in Tokyo, Japan, and again on May 17, 2008 in Osaka, Japan as a part of Key's ten-year anniversary commemoration. The concert featured songs by Lia, Rita, Chata, and Tomoe Tamiyasu who have previously sung songs for singles and albums released under Key's record label Key Sounds Label (KSL). Another concert called KSL Live World 2010: Way to the Kud-Wafter was held in Tokyo on May 21, 2010 and again twice more on May 22, 2010. The concert featured songs sung by Keiko Suzuki, Miyako Suzuta, Aoi Tada, Tomoe Tamiyasu, Chata, Marina, Lia, LiSA, Rita and Riya of Eufonius; however, Riya only appeared at the May 22 concerts.

Three albums were released which consists of two live albums and twos remix album. The first live album was released in December 2008 containing the recording of the May 17, 2008 concert. The second live album was released in December 2010 containing recordings from one of the May 22, 2010 concerts. The first remix album featured remixes of the opening theme "Last regrets" from Key's debut visual novel Kanon and was released at 2008 concerts. The second remix album, released at the 2010 concerts, featured remixes of songs from Clannad, Little Busters! and Kud Wafter. The albums are produced under the record label Key Sounds Label, a division of VisualArt's.

== Albums ==
=== KSL Live World 2008: Pamphlet and Memorial Disc ===
KSL Live World 2008: Pamphlet and Memorial Disc is a remix album released on May 10, 2008 in Japan by Key Sounds Label bearing the catalog numbers KSLC-0001—0002. The album was first released at the Tokyo, Japan showing of Key's tenth anniversary commemoration concert KSL Live World 2008: Way to the Little Busters! EX. The album was also sold at the Osaka, Japan showing of the concert on May 17, 2008. The album contains two CDs in LP-sized packaging, respectively titled A-side and B-side. The A-side contains six remixes of the opening theme of Key's debut visual novel Kanon, "Last regrets", sung by three different artists; Eiko Shimamiya sings the third track, Lia sings the fifth, and Ayana sings the remaining four songs.

Three of the tracks were previously featured on other singles and albums released by Key Sounds Label and I've Sound. The second track originally appeared on "Last regrets / Kaze no Tadoritsuku Basho" (2006) by Key Sounds Label, the third track came from I've Sound's compilation album Regret (1999), and the fifth track appeared on Recollections (2001) by Key Sounds Label. The song "Last regrets" was originally written and composed by Jun Maeda of Key, and sung by Ayana. The B-side contains a two-part recording of a group talk of the live performers from the concert. The cover art features the heroines Rin Natsume and Komari Kamikita from Key's visual novel Little Busters!.

All tracks are written by Jun Maeda.

Side A
No.	Title	Arrangement	Length
1.	"Last regrets (Girls in Tears mix)" (Performed by Ayana)	a2c	4:51
2.	"Last regrets (2006 memorial mix)" (Performed by Ayana)	Manack	6:32
3.	"Last regrets (X'mas floor style)" (Performed by Eiko Shimamiya)	Kazuya Takase (I've Sound)	5:28
4.	"Last regrets (fiberjelly mix)" (Performed by Ayana)	Keiichi Sugiyama	6:18
5.	"Last regrets (acoustic version)" (Performed by Lia)	Ryō Okabe	5:56
6.	"Last regrets (orbit)" (Performed by Ayana)	ZTS	12:18

Side B
No.	Title	Length
1.	"Round-table Discussion (Part 1)"	21:22
2.	"Round-table Discussion (Part 2)"	35:36
Total length:		98:20

=== KSL Live World 2008: Way to the Little Busters! EX ===
KSL Live World 2008: Way to the Little Busters! EX is a live album released on December 28, 2008 at Comiket 75 in Japan by Key Sounds Label bearing the catalog numbers KSLA-0045—0046. The album is the recording of the second KSL Live World 2008 concert held in Osaka, Japan in May 2008, and includes the talks from the MCs in addition to the live music. The album contains two discs with twenty music tracks and eleven MC tracks. Four singers sang at the concert: Chata, Lia, Rita, and Tomoe Tamiyasu. The album is composed, arranged, and produced by Jun Maeda and Shinji Orito, among several others. The musicians at the concert were Hikari Syuyo (guitar), Fire Kawahara (side guitar), UDN (bass), Kenji Maeda (drum), and Katsutoshi (keyboard). Music from five of Key's visual novels were performed: one from Kanon, two from Air, six from Clannad, three from Tomoyo After: It's a Wonderful Life, and five from Little Busters!. Two of the songs were from Lia's singles "Birthday Song,Requiem" and "Spica/Hanabi/Moon".

Disc 1
No.	Title	Music	Arrangement	Length
1.	"Little Busters!" (Lyrics by Jun Maeda; Performed by Rita)	Jun Maeda	Tomoyuki Nakazawa, Takeshi Ozaki (I've Sound)	4:58
2.	"MC Rita / Tomoe Tamiyasu / Shinji Orito" (MC Rita・民安ともえ・折戸伸治 MC Rita / Tamiyasu Tomoe / Orito Shinji)			5:11
3.	"Song for friends" (Lyrics by Jun Maeda; Performed by Rita)	Jun Maeda	MintJam	5:21
4.	"Haruka Kanata" (遥か彼方 Faraway) (Lyrics by Jun Maeda; Performed by Rita)	Jun Maeda	Manack	5:45
5.	"MC Rita"			1:37
6.	"Alicemagic" (Lyrics by Yūto Tonokawa; Performed by Rita)	Shinji Orito	MintJam	4:44
7.	"Instrument (Gensō)" (Instrument -幻想- Instrument (Fantasy))	Magome Togoshi		1:19
8.	"Mag Mell" (メグメル Megu Meru) (Lyrics by Riya; Performed by Chata)	Eufonius	Kiku	5:06
9.	"MC Chata / Tomoe Tamiyasu / Shinji Orito" (MC 茶太・民安ともえ・折戸伸治 MC Chata / Tamiyasu Tomoe / Orito Shinji)			3:44
10.	"Over" (オーバー Ōbā) (Lyrics by Key; Performed by Chata)	Shinji Orito	Manyo	4:58
11.	"Ichiman no Kiseki" (一万の軌跡 Ten Thousand Places) (Lyrics by Key; Performed by Chata)	Shinji Orito, Magome Togoshi	Manyo	6:56
12.	"MC Chata" (MC 茶太)			1:03
13.	"Chiisana Tenohira" (小さな手のひら Small Palms) (Lyrics by Jun Maeda; Performed by Chata)	Jun Maeda	Magome Togoshi	4:59
14.	"Instrument (hope)"	Jun Maeda	Yuki Shimizu	1:05
15.	"Light colors" (Lyrics by Jun Maeda; Performed by Lia)	Shinji Orito	Kazuya Takase (I've Sound)	6:12
16.	"MC Lia"			1:17
17.	"Life is Like a Melody" (Lyrics by Jun Maeda; Performed by Lia)	Jun Maeda	Magome Togoshi	5:50

Disc 2
No.	Title	Music	Arrangement	Length
1.	"MC Tomoe Tamiyasu / Shinji Orito" (MC 民安ともえ・折戸伸治 MC Tamiyasu Tomoe / Orito Shinji)			4:19
2.	"Rin no Hisokana Koi no Uta" (鈴の密かな恋の歌 Rin's Secret Love Song) (Lyrics by Jun Maeda; Performed by Tomoe Tamiyasu)	Jun Maeda	MintJam	4:35
3.	"Spica" (Lyrics by Jun Maeda; Performed by Lia)	Jun Maeda	Sorma	5:10
4.	"MC Lia"			0:44
5.	"Birthday Song,Requiem" (Lyrics by Jun Maeda; Performed by Lia)	Jun Maeda	Magome Togoshi	4:26
6.	"MC Lia / Tomoe Tamiyasu / Shinji Orito" (MC Lia・民安ともえ・折戸伸治 MC Lia / Tamiyasu Tomoe / Orito Shinji)			7:06
7.	"Tori no Uta" (鳥の詩 Bird's Poem) (Lyrics by Jun Maeda; Performed by Lia)	Shinji Orito	Kazuya Takase (I've Sound)	6:20
8.	"MC Rita / Chata / Lia / Tomoe Tamiyasu / Shinji Orito" (MC Rita・茶太・Lia・民安ともえ・折戸伸治 MC Rita / Chata / Lia / Tamiyasu Tomoe / Orito Shinji)			5:30
9.	"Kaze no Tadoritsuku Basho" (風の辿り着く場所 Where the Wind Reaches) (Lyrics by Jun Maeda; Performed by Chata, Lia, Rita, Tomoe Tamiyasu)	Shinji Orito	Kazuya Takase (I've Sound)	6:41
10.	"Encore MC Lia" (アンコールMC Lia Ankōru MC Lia)			5:01
11.	"Natsukage" (夏影 Summer Lights) (Lyrics by Jun Maeda; Performed by Lia)	Jun Maeda	Ryō Okabe	6:17
12.	"Dango Daikazoku" (だんご大家族 A Large Family of Dango) (Lyrics by Jun Maeda; Performed by Chata)	Jun Maeda	Takumaru	4:47
13.	"Encore MC Rita" (アンコールMC Rita Ankōru MC Rita)			2:13
14.	"Little Busters! (Little Jumper ver.)" (Lyrics by Jun Maeda; Performed by Rita)	Jun Maeda	Tomoyuki Nakazawa, Takeshi Ozaki (I've Sound)	5:06
Total length:				138:30

=== KSL Live World 2010: Pamphlet Music Disc ===
KSL Live World 2010: Pamphlet Music Disc is a remix album released on May 21, 2010 in Japan by Key Sounds Label bearing the catalog number KSLC-0008. The album was first released at the showings of the KSL Live World 2010: Way to the Kud-Wafter concerts. The album contains one disc with six tracks remixing music from Clannad, Little Busters!, and Kud Wafter. The original versions of these songs were played live at the concerts. The album is composed, arranged, and produced by Jun Maeda, Shinji Orito, and Jun'ichi Shimizu. Singers on the album include: Chata, Lia, Rita, Riya, Keiko Suzuki, and Miyako Suzuta.

Track listing
No.	Title	Music	Length
1.	"One's Future (Square Remix)" (Lyrics by Kai; Performed by Miyako Suzuta)	Jun'ichi Shimizu	4:48
2.	"Raison (Crystal Cube Mix)" (Lyrics by Chika Shirokiri; Performed by Keiko Suzuki)	Shinji Orito	5:14
3.	"Over (Keep Paddling mix)" (オーバー Ōbā) (Lyrics by Jun Maeda; Performed by Riya)	Shinji Orito	4:38
4.	"Toki o Kizamu Uta (KSL Live World Mix)" (時を刻む唄 A Song to Pass the Time) (Lyrics by Jun Maeda; Performed by Lia)	Jun Maeda	4:38
5.	"Alicemagic (hemuri mix)" (Lyrics by Yūto Tonokawa; Performed by Rita)	Shinji Orito	4:58
6.	"Dango Daikazoku (Arcana structure)" (だんご大家族 The Big Dango Family) (Lyrics by Jun Maeda; Performed by Chata)	Jun Maeda	4:36
Total length:			28:52

=== KSL Live World 2010: Way to the Kud Wafter ===
KSL Live World 2010: Way to the Kud Wafter is a live album released on December 24, 2010 in Japan by Key Sounds Label bearing the catalog numbers KSLA-0061—0063. The album contains recordings from one of the May 22 KSL Live World 2010 concerts, and includes the talks from the MCs in addition to the live music. The album contains three discs with 27 music tracks and 14 MC tracks. Ten singers sang at the concert: Keiko Suzuki, Miyako Suzuta, Aoi Tada, Tomoe Tamiyasu, Chata, Marina, Lia, LiSA, Rita and Eufonius; however, Eufonius only appeared at the May 22 concerts. The album is composed, arranged, and produced by Jun Maeda and Shinji Orito, among several others. Music from five of Key's visual novels, as well as the Angel Beats! anime, were performed. Two of the songs were from Lia's singles "Birthday Song,Requiem" and "Spica/Hanabi/Moon", and one ("Karma") is from Lia's album Dearly.

Disc 1
No.	Title	Music	Arrangement	Length
1.	"One's Future" (Lyrics by Kai; Performed by Miyako Suzuta)	Jun'ichi Shimizu	Manack	5:25
2.	"Opening MC" (オープニングMC Ōpuningu MC)			6:17
3.	"Rin no Hisoka na Koi no Uta (My Style Remix)" (鈴の密かな恋の歌 Rin's Secret Love Song) (Lyrics by Jun Maeda; Performed by Tomoe Tamiyasu)	Jun Maeda	Setzer	5:31
4.	"Raison" (Lyrics by Chika Shirokiri; Performed by Keiko Suzuki)	Shinji Orito	Manyo	5:29
5.	"MC Keiko Suzuki & Rita & Orito" (MC すずきけいこ&Rita&折戸)			2:36
6.	"Alicemagic (RockStar ver.)" (Lyrics by Yūto Tonokawa; Performed by Rita)	Shinji Orito		5:14
7.	"Little Busters! (Little Jumper ver.)" (Lyrics by Jun Maeda; Performed by Rita)	Jun Maeda	I've Sound	5:06
8.	"MC Rita & Orito" (MC Rita&折戸)			0:44
9.	"Mag Mell" (メグメル Megu Meru) (Lyrics by Riya; Performed by Eufonius)	Eufonius	Hajime Kikuchi	5:09
10.	"MC Eufonius"			1:45
11.	"Over" (オーバー Ōbā) (Lyrics by Jun Maeda; Performed by Eufonius)	Shinji Orito	Manyo	5:01
12.	"Kage Futatsu (MintJam Ver.)" (影二つ Two Shadows) (Lyrics by Kai; Performed by Chata)	Magome Togoshi	Magome Togoshi	5:33
13.	"MC Chata & Rita & Orito 3" (MC 茶太&Rita&折戸3)			2:56
14.	"Light Colors" (Lyrics by Jun Maeda; Performed by Lia)	Shinji Orito	Kazuya Takase	6:29

Disc 2
No.	Title	Music	Arrangement	Length
1.	"Farewell Song" (Lyrics by Jun Maeda; Performed by Lia)	Magome Togoshi	Magome Togoshi	5:44
2.	"MC Lia"			2:54
3.	"Karma" (Lyrics by Jun Maeda; Performed by Lia)	Jun Maeda	Aikamachi+nagie	6:01
4.	"MC Lia & Aoi Tada" (MC Lia&多田葵)			4:17
5.	"Brave Song" (Lyrics by Jun Maeda; Performed by Aoi Tada)	Jun Maeda	Anant-Garde Eyes	5:44
6.	"Thousand Enemies" (Lyrics by Jun Maeda; Performed by LiSA)	Jun Maeda	Hikari Syuyo	4:53
7.	"MC LiSA 1"			2:35
8.	"Alchemy" (Lyrics by Jun Maeda; Performed by LiSA)	Jun Maeda	Hikari Syuyo	4:16
9.	"MC LiSA 2"			2:37
10.	"Crow Song" (Lyrics by Jun Maeda; Performed by LiSA)	Jun Maeda	Hikari Syuyo	5:03
11.	"MC Marina"			0:49
12.	"My Song" (Lyrics by Jun Maeda; Performed by Marina)	Jun Maeda	Hikari Syuyo	5:09
13.	"MC Lia & Rita & Orito" (MC Lia&Rita&折戸)			6:47
14.	"Toki o Kizamu Uta" (時を刻む唄 A Song to Pass the Time) (Lyrics by Jun Maeda; Performed by Lia)	Jun Maeda	Anant-Garde Eyes	5:04
15.	"Ending MC" (エンディングMC Endingu MC)			0:47
16.	"My Soul, Your Beats!" (Lyrics by Jun Maeda; Performed by Lia)	Jun Maeda	Anant-Garde Eyes	5:11

Disc 3
No.	Title	Music	Arrangement	Length
1.	"Encore MC 1" (アンコールMC1 Ankōru MC 1)			3:04
2.	"Tori no Uta" (鳥の詩 Bird's Poem) (Lyrics by Jun Maeda; Performed by Lia)	Shinji Orito	Kazuya Takase	6:41
3.	"Dango Daikazoku" (だんご大家族 The Big Dango Family) (Lyrics by Jun Maeda; Performed by Chata)	Jun Maeda	Takumaru	4:47
4.	"Encore MC 2" (アンコールMC2 Ankōru MC 2)			3:00
5.	"One's Future" (Lyrics by Kai; Performed by Miyako Suzuta)	Jun'ichi Shimizu	Manack	5:43
6.	"Neko to Garasu to Marui Tsuki" (猫と硝子と円い月 Cat, Glass, and the Round Moon) (Lyrics by Yūto Tonokawa; Performed by Tomoe Tamiyasu)	Jun Maeda	Manack	4:56
7.	"Mission:Love sniper" (Lyrics by Jun Maeda; Performed by Tomoe Tamiyasu)	Arm, Jun Maeda	Arm	6:26
8.	"Mag Mell" (メグメル Megu Meru) (Lyrics by Riya; Performed by Chata)	Eufonius	Hajime Kikuchi	5:16
9.	"Over" (オーバー Ōbā) (Lyrics by Jun Maeda; Performed by Chata)	Shinji Orito	Manyo	4:57
10.	"Birthday Song,Requiem" (Lyrics by Jun Maeda; Performed by Lia)	Jun Maeda	Magome Togoshi	4:33
11.	"Hanabi" (Lyrics by Jun Maeda; Performed by Lia)	Jun Maeda	Yū Hagiwara	7:29
Total length:				187:58
