= Music of Little Busters! =

Little Busters! and Little Busters! Ecstasy discography
- Extended plays: 1
- Soundtrack albums: 3
- Compilation albums: 1
- Singles: 8
- Remixes: 5

Little Busters! and Little Busters! Ecstasy are visual novels developed by Key and published by VisualArt's in 2007 and 2008. The story follows Riki Naoe, a high school student and member of a close-knit group of friends who call themselves the Little Busters. It was adapted by J.C.Staff into two anime television series broadcast between 2012 and 2013, and an original video animation series to be released in 2014, directed by Yoshiki Yamakawa with music direction by Shinji Orito. The discography of Little Busters!, Ecstasy, and the anime adaptations consists of one compilation album, one EP, eight singles, three soundtracks, and five remix albums.

The core of the discography consists of two original soundtrack albums for the visual novels, one for Little Busters! and the other for Ecstasy. The soundtracks were produced by Key Sounds Label and released in 2007 and 2008. The music on the soundtracks was mainly composed and arranged by Jun Maeda, Shinji Orito, Magome Togoshi, Manack, and PMMK. The third soundtrack album is for the Little Busters! Refrain anime series. Five remix albums were released for the two games between 2007 and 2013. An EP for Little Busters! was released in 2008 covering three pieces of theme music used in the game as well as remix versions of those songs. A compilation album mainly containing previously released vocal tracks for the visual novels and anime adaptations was released in 2014. Eight singles were released between 2007 and 2013: a theme song single for Little Busters!; four image song singles covering the characters Rin Natsume, Saya Tokido, Kanata Futaki, and Sasami Sasasegawa; and three theme song singles for the anime series adaptations.

== Albums ==
=== Semicrystalline. ===
Semicrystalline. is an arrange album which contains a selection of songs from the visual novel Little Busters!, remixed by Rintaro Iwashita of PMMK. The album is otherwise composed, and produced by Jun Maeda and members of PMMK. The album came with the subtitle: "Little Busters! original arrange album". This album was released as a bonus item, included with the limited edition first printing of the PC version of the game released on July 27, 2007, by Key Sounds Label bearing the catalog number KSLA-0032. As a result, it was not released for individual sale. Of the ten tracks on the one-disc album, eight are remixed background music from the game while the last two are remix versions of "Little Busters!" and "Haruka Kanata", two songs originally featured on the "Little Busters!" single. The last track, "Replicato", uses a portion of the ninth track "Haruka Kanata (Semicrystalline. remix)" played in reverse.

Track listing
| No. | Title | Music | Arrangement | Length |
|---|---|---|---|---|
| 1. | "Tonica" | PMMK | Rintaro Iwashita | 1:35 |
| 2. | "Little Busters! (Semicrystalline. remix)" (Lyrics by Jun Maeda; Performed by Rita) | Jun Maeda | PMMK | 4:31 |
| 3. | "Bugs (so tiny)" | Jun Maeda | Rintaro Iwashita | 2:52 |
| 4. | "Tomorrow (so artificial)" | Jun Maeda | Rintaro Iwashita | 3:35 |
| 5. | "Brother (so quiet)" | Jun Maeda | Rintaro Iwashita | 2:44 |
| 6. | "Umbrella (so old)" | Manack | Rintaro Iwashita | 2:48 |
| 7. | "Dive (so fast)" | PMMK | Rintaro Iwashita | 5:50 |
| 8. | "Sister (so lonely)" | Jun Maeda | Rintaro Iwashita | 4:01 |
| 9. | "Haruka Kanata (Semicrystalline. remix)" (遥か彼方 Faraway) (Lyrics by Jun Maeda; Performed by Rita) | Jun Maeda | PMMK | 7:31 |
| 10. | "Replicato" | PMMK | Rintaro Iwashita | 1:00 |
| Total length: | | | | 36:35 |

=== Little Busters! Original Soundtrack ===
The Little Busters! Original Soundtrack, from the visual novel Little Busters!, was first released on August 17, 2007, at Comiket 72 in Japan by Key Sounds Label bearing the catalog numbers KSLA-0033—0035. The soundtrack was re-released on September 28, 2007, and contains three discs totaling fifty-three songs composed, arranged, and produced by Jun Maeda, Shinji Orito, Magome Togoshi, Manack, Ryō Mizutsuki, members of MintJam, and members of PMMK. Rita provides vocals for five songs, "Little Busters!" (plus remixes), "Haruka Kanata", "Alicemagic", "Amenochi Hare", and "Song for friends".

Disc 1
| No. | Title | Music | Arrangement | Length |
|---|---|---|---|---|
| 1. | "Little Busters!" (Lyrics by Jun Maeda; Performed by Rita) | Jun Maeda | I've Sound | 4:47 |
| 2. | "Ring Ring Ring!" | Jun Maeda | Manack | 3:55 |
| 3. | "Mahō no Ensemble" (魔法のアンサンブル Magic Ensemble) | PMMK | PMMK | 3:47 |
| 4. | "Sawagashi Otome no Yūshū" (騒がし乙女の憂愁 Melancholy of a Noisy Girl) | PMMK | PMMK | 4:24 |
| 5. | "Exotic Toybox" (えきぞちっく・といぼっくす Ekizochikku Toibokkusu) | PMMK | PMMK | 4:21 |
| 6. | "Kokoroiro Kisōkyoku" (心色綺想曲 Heart-colored Capriccio) | Manack | Manack | 4:15 |
| 7. | "Hikari ni Yosete" (光に寄せて Approaching Light) | Shinji Orito | Manack | 4:20 |
| 8. | "Boys Don't Cry" | Jun Maeda | Manack | 3:04 |
| 9. | "Boys Don't Cry (intro only)" | Jun Maeda | Manack | 1:47 |
| 10. | "Mezameta Asa ni" (目覚めた朝に Waking Up in the Morning) | Jun Maeda | Ryō Mizutsuki | 2:23 |
| 11. | "Hisoyaka na Sazameki" (密やかなさざめき Quiet Hubbub) | PMMK | PMMK | 2:55 |
| 12. | "My Brave Smile" | PMMK | PMMK | 3:12 |
| 13. | "Slow Curve" (スローカーブ Surō Kābu) | Jun Maeda | Manack | 2:35 |
| 14. | "Shōjotachi no Gogo 4-ji-han" (少女たちの午後４時半 Girls at 4:30 P.M.) | Shinji Orito | Magome Togoshi | 2:52 |
| 15. | "Day Game" (デーゲーム Dē Gēmu) | Shinji Orito | Manack, Shinji Orito | 3:28 |
| 16. | "Tick Tack Routine" (チクタク・ルーチン Chikutaku Rūchin) | PMMK | PMMK | 2:48 |
| 17. | "Kakekko" (かけっこ Race) | PMMK | PMMK | 1:32 |
| 18. | "Thin Chronicle" (シンクロニクル Shin Kuronikuru) | PMMK | PMMK | 1:37 |
| 19. | "Osatō Futatsu" (お砂糖ふたつ Two Sugars) | PMMK | PMMK | 1:14 |
| 20. | "Amenochi Hare (instrumental)" (雨のち晴れ Clear Weather After the Rain) | PMMK | PMMK | 4:25 |

Disc 2
| No. | Title | Music | Arrangement | Length |
|---|---|---|---|---|
| 1. | "Mission possible (but difficult task)" | Shinji Orito | Shinji Orito | 2:22 |
| 2. | "Yūsōnaru Tatakai" (勇壮なる闘い Heroic Battle) | Magome Togoshi | Magome Togoshi | 3:26 |
| 3. | "Shitō wa Rinzen Narite" (死闘は凛然なりて Commanding Struggle to the Death) | Shinji Orito | Manack, Shinji Orito | 3:19 |
| 4. | "Boku no Iya na Koto" (ぼくのいやなこと My Unpleasant Thing) | Manack | Manack | 2:43 |
| 5. | "Genjitsu" (幻日 Parhelion) | Manack | Manack | 3:28 |
| 6. | "Tomoshibi" (ともしび Lamplight) | Jun Maeda | Manack | 2:44 |
| 7. | "Furitsuzuku Ame no Machi de" (降り続く雨の街で In The Town of Incessant Rain) | Manack | Manack | 2:39 |
| 8. | "Itsuka Kizuku ka na" (いつか気付くかな I Wonder if I Will Realize it in Time) | Shinji Orito | Shinji Orito | 1:28 |
| 9. | "Let's Return" (れっつ・りたーん Rettsu Ritān) | Jun Maeda | Manack | 2:37 |
| 10. | "Tsutaerarenai Message" (伝えられないメッセージ Incommunicable Message) | Manack | Manack | 3:37 |
| 11. | "Mudai 'Koigokoro o Kanaderu Kisōkyoku'" (無題『恋心を奏でる綺想曲』 No Title 'Playing a Capriccio to Awaken One's Love') | Manack | Manack | 2:09 |
| 12. | "Tatta Hitotsu no Mahō no Kotoba" (たったひとつの魔法の言葉 Only One Magic Word) | PMMK | PMMK | 3:45 |
| 13. | "Song for friends (instrumental)" | Jun Maeda | Jun Maeda | 1:46 |
| 14. | "Haruka Kanata (instrumental)" (遥か彼方 Faraway) | Jun Maeda | Manack | 2:33 |
| 15. | "Little Melody" | Jun Maeda | Ryō Mizutsuki | 3:54 |
| 16. | "Shōnentachi to no Wakare (piano only)" (少年たちとの別れ Parting of the Boys) | PMMK | PMMK | 2:18 |
| 17. | "Nanimo Okoranakatta Sekai" (何も起こらなかった世界 Nothing Happened in this World) | PMMK | PMMK | 7:16 |
| 18. | "Umareochiru Sekai" (生まれ落ちる世界 Born into this World) | PMMK | PMMK | 4:55 |
| 19. | "Regret" (リグレット Riguretto) | PMMK | PMMK | 4:46 |
| 20. | "Shōnentachi to no Wakare" (少年たちとの別れ Parting of the Boys) | PMMK | PMMK | 2:17 |

Disc 3
| No. | Title | Music | Arrangement | Length |
|---|---|---|---|---|
| 1. | "Haruka Kanata" (遥か彼方 Faraway) (Lyrics by Jun Maeda; Performed by Rita) | Jun Maeda | Manack | 5:36 |
| 2. | "Alicemagic" (Lyrics by Yūto Tonokawa; Performed by Rita) | Shinji Orito | MintJam | 4:31 |
| 3. | "Amenochi Hare" (雨のち晴れ Clear Weather After the Rain) (Lyrics by Leo Kashida; Performed by Rita) | PMMK | PMMK | 5:36 |
| 4. | "Song for friends" (Lyrics by Jun Maeda; Performed by Rita) | Jun Maeda | MintJam | 5:14 |
| 5. | "Little Busters! (Little Jumper Ver.)" (Lyrics by Jun Maeda; Performed by Rita) | Jun Maeda | I've Sound | 4:47 |
| 6. | "Little Busters! (Short Ver.)" (Lyrics by Jun Maeda; Performed by Rita) | Jun Maeda | I've Sound | 3:14 |
| 7. | "Alicemagic (Short Ver.)" (Lyrics by Yūto Tonokawa; Performed by Rita) | Shinji Orito | MintJam | 3:09 |
| 8. | "Amenochi Hare (Short Ver.)" (雨のち晴れ Clear Weather After the Rain) (Lyrics by Leo Kashida; Performed by Rita) | PMMK | PMMK | 3:14 |
| 9. | "Song for friends (Short Ver.)" (Lyrics by Jun Maeda; Performed by Rita) | Jun Maeda | MintJam | 3:41 |
| 10. | "Little Busters! (Little Jumper Short Ver.)" (Lyrics by Jun Maeda; Performed by Rita) | Jun Maeda | I've Sound | 3:39 |
| 11. | "Mishiyō Kyoku 1" (未使用曲 Unused Track; "Little Busters! (Jumper Ver.)") (Lyrics by Jun Maeda; Performed by Rita) | Jun Maeda | I've Sound | 4:47 |
| 12. | "Mishiyō Kyoku 2" (未使用曲 Unused Track; "Song for friends (instrumental Ver.)") | Jun Maeda | MintJam | 3:26 |
| 13. | "Mishiyō Kyoku 3" (未使用曲 Unused Track) | Jun Maeda | Ryō Mizutsuki | 3:09 |
| Total length: | | | | 181:46 |

=== Rockstar Busters! ===
Rockstar Busters! is a hard rock arrange album with songs taken from the Little Busters! visual novel and arranged into hard rock versions. It was released on December 28, 2007, at Comiket 73 in Japan by Key Sounds Label bearing the catalog number KSLA-0037, and was re-released on August 15, 2008. The album contains one disc with twelve tracks all arranged by the rock group MintJam, and Terra, a member of the group, provides vocals for the eleventh track. Rita provides vocals for three songs, "Little Busters!", "Haruka Kanata", and "Alicemagic". The album is otherwise composed and produced by Jun Maeda, Shinji Orito, Magome Togoshi, Manack, and members of PMMK.

Track listing
| No. | Title | Music | Arrangement | Length |
|---|---|---|---|---|
| 1. | "Little Busters!" (Lyrics by Jun Maeda; Performed by Rita) | Jun Maeda | a2c, Terra | 4:44 |
| 2. | "My Brave Smile" | PMMK | a2c, Setzer | 2:14 |
| 3. | "Day Game" (デーゲーム Dē Gēmu) | Shinji Orito | Terra | 2:35 |
| 4. | "Mission possible (but difficult task)" | Shinji Orito | Setzer | 3:05 |
| 5. | "Yūsōnaru Tatakai" (勇壮なる闘い Heroic Battle) | Magome Togoshi | Setzer | 3:37 |
| 6. | "Haruka Kanata" (遥か彼方 Faraway) (Lyrics by Jun Maeda; Performed by Rita) | Jun Maeda | Setzer | 6:02 |
| 7. | "Tsutaerarenai Message" (伝えられないメッセージ Incommunicable Message) | Manack | a2c | 5:01 |
| 8. | "Tatta Hitotsu no Mahō no Kotoba" (たったひとつの魔法の言葉 Only One Magic Word) | PMMK | a2c | 4:03 |
| 9. | "Hikari ni Yosete" (光に寄せて Approaching Light) | Shinji Orito | Terra | 3:50 |
| 10. | "Alicemagic" (Lyrics by Yūto Tonokawa; Performed by Rita) | Shinji Orito | a2c | 4:48 |
| 11. | "Little Busters! (Little Jumper Ver. MJ cover)" (Lyrics by Jun Maeda; Performed by Terra) | Jun Maeda | a2c, Terra | 4:39 |
| 12. | "Little Busters! (Little Jumper Ver. MJ cover off vocal)" | Jun Maeda | a2c, Terra | 4:37 |
| Total length: | | | | 49:15 |

=== Little Busters! Analog Collector's Edition ===
Little Busters! Analog Collector's Edition: Little Busters! / Haruka Kanata / Alicemagic (Little Busters! Analog Collector's Edition: Little Busters! / 遥か彼方 / Alicemagic) is an EP released on a gramophone record for the Little Busters! visual novel released on May 4, 2008, in Japan by Key Sounds Label bearing the catalog number KSLA-0041, and re-released for general sale on July 25, 2008. The EP features three of the theme songs from the visual novel in regular versions on the A-side, and remix versions on the B-side. The remix versions are from the second OTSU Club Music Compilation album released on February 29, 2008. The EP is composed, arranged, and produced by Jun Maeda, Shinji Orito, Yūto Tonokawa, Manack, members of MintJam, ZTS, Svenson, and Blasterhead.

Side A
| No. | Title | Lyrics | Music | Arrangement | Length |
|---|---|---|---|---|---|
| 1. | "Little Busters!" | Jun Maeda | Jun Maeda | I've Sound | 4:47 |
| 2. | "Haruka Kanata" (遥か彼方 Faraway) | Jun Maeda | Jun Maeda | Manack | 5:36 |
| 3. | "Alicemagic" | Yūto Tonokawa | Shinji Orito | MintJam | 4:31 |

Side B
| No. | Title | Lyrics | Music | Arrangement | Length |
|---|---|---|---|---|---|
| 1. | "Little Busters! (Remixed ZTS)" | Jun Maeda | Jun Maeda | ZTS | 11:46 |
| 2. | "Haruka Kanata (Remixed Svenson)" (遥か彼方 Faraway) | Jun Maeda | Jun Maeda | Sven Maes | 9:54 |
| 3. | "Alicemagic (Remixed Blasterhead)" | Yūto Tonokawa | Shinji Orito | Blasterhead | 4:30 |
| Total length: | | | | | 41:04 |

=== Ontology ===
Ontology is an arrange album which contains a selection of songs from the visual novel Little Busters! Ecstasy, remixed by members of Key. The album is otherwise composed, and produced by Jun Maeda and members of PMMK. This album was released as a bonus item, included with the limited edition first printing of the PC version of Little Busters! Ecstasy released on July 25, 2008, by Key Sounds Label bearing the catalog number KSLA-0042. As a result, it was not released for individual sale. Of the nine tracks on the one-disc album, seven are remixed background music from Little Busters!, and two—"Neko to Garasu to Marui Tsuki" and "Kakeru"—are exclusive tracks of Little Busters! Ecstasy.

All music is composed by Jun Maeda, except where noted.

Track listing
| No. | Title | Length |
|---|---|---|
| 1. | "Regret (Cutting, Clicks, Errors)" (リグレット Riguretto) (Composed by PMMK) | 4:46 |
| 2. | "Ring Ring Ring! ('Kling Klang' Chips)" | 4:37 |
| 3. | "Neko to Garasu to Marui Tsuki (Sun Lights Station)" (猫と硝子と円い月 Cat, Glass, and the Round Moon) | 3:45 |
| 4. | "Let's Return (Discolor-scape)" (れっつ・りたーん Rettsu Ritān) | 3:44 |
| 5. | "Kakeru (Moresis Native Cut)" (駆ける Run) | 2:57 |
| 6. | "Slow Curve (Slowdiving into the Sunset)" (スローカーブ Surō Kābu) | 3:33 |
| 7. | "Tomoshibi (Glowlight Ghost)" (ともしび Lamplight) | 4:15 |
| 8. | "Boys Don't Cry (intro only Spring and Small Dub)" | 4:32 |
| 9. | "Umareochiru Sekai (Little Miniature Garden)" (生まれ落ちる世界 Born into this World) (Composed by PMMK) | 4:14 |
| Total length: | | 36:23 |

=== Little Busters! Ecstasy Tracks ===
Little Busters! Ecstasy Tracks (リトルバスターズ！エクスタシートラックス, Ritoru Basutāzu! Ekusutashī Trakkusu) is a soundtrack containing the music tracks exclusive to the visual novel Little Busters! Ecstasy. The soundtrack was first released on August 15, 2008, at Comiket 74 in Japan by Key Sounds Label bearing the catalog number KSLA-0043, and was re-released on December 25, 2008. The soundtrack contains one disc with fifteen tracks composed, arranged, and produced by Jun Maeda, Shinji Orito, Yūto Tonokawa, and Manack. Rita provides vocals for four songs, short and long versions of "Little Busters! (Ecstasy Ver.)", "Song for friends (No Intro Ver.)", and "Alicemagic (Rockstar Short Ver.)". Lia provides vocals for the short and long versions of "Saya's Song". "Kakeru" is heavily sampled from the song "Hashiru" on the album Love Song.

Track listing
| No. | Title | Music | Arrangement | Length |
|---|---|---|---|---|
| 1. | "Little Busters! (Ecstasy Short Ver.)" (Lyrics by Jun Maeda; Performed by Rita) | Jun Maeda | I've Sound, MintJam | 3:39 |
| 2. | "Will&Wish" | Shinji Orito | Manack | 3:34 |
| 3. | "Neko to Garasu to Marui Tsuki" (猫と硝子と円い月 Cat, Glass, and the Round Moon) | Jun Maeda | Manack | 3:07 |
| 4. | "Kakeru" (駆ける Run) | Jun Maeda | Manack, Moresis | 3:27 |
| 5. | "Glassware" | Jun Maeda | Manack | 4:30 |
| 6. | "Saya's Melody" | Jun Maeda | Manack | 2:16 |
| 7. | "Labyrinth" | Ishisan, Shinji Orito | Shinji Orito | 5:40 |
| 8. | "Shadow Buster" | Ishisan, Shinji Orito | Shinji Orito | 3:46 |
| 9. | "Thinking Time" | Manack | Manack | 2:46 |
| 10. | "Sha La La Ecstasy" (Performed by Haruka Shimotsuki (chorus only)) | Manack | Manack | 2:32 |
| 11. | "Saya's Song (Short Ver.)" (Lyrics by Jun Maeda; Performed by Lia) | Jun Maeda | Anant-Garde Eyes | 3:41 |
| 12. | "Song for friends (No Intro Ver.)" (Lyrics by Jun Maeda; Performed by Rita) | Jun Maeda | MintJam | 3:11 |
| 13. | "Alicemagic (Rockstar Short Ver.)" (Lyrics by Yūto Tonokawa; Performed by Rita) | Shinji Orito | MintJam | 3:15 |
| 14. | "Saya's Song" (Lyrics by Jun Maeda; Performed by Lia) | Jun Maeda | Anant-Garde Eyes | 5:03 |
| 15. | "Little Busters! (Ecstasy Ver.)" (Lyrics by Jun Maeda; Performed by Rita) | Jun Maeda | I've Sound, MintJam | 4:47 |
| Total length: | | | | 55:14 |

=== Deejay Busters! ===
Deejay Busters! is a remix album of songs taken from the Little Busters!, Little Busters! Ecstasy and Kud Wafter visual novels and remixed into electronic dance music. It was originally released on May 8, 2011, at the Rewrite Fes. promotional event in Japan by Key Sounds Label bearing the catalog number KSLA-0068, and was later released for general sale on May 27, 2011. The album contains one disc with ten tracks originally composed by Jun Maeda, Shinji Orito and Jun'ichi Shimizu, and features ten separate remix artists. Of the ten tracks, 1, 2, 3, 9, and 10 are from Little Busters! and Ecstasy, while the others are from Kud Wafter. Four artists provide vocals for five songs: Rita sings "Little Busters!" and "Alicemagic", Miyako Suzuta sings "One's Future", Lia sings "Saya's Song", and Haruka Shimotsuki sings "Hoshikuzu".

Track listing
| No. | Title | Music | Arrangement | Length |
|---|---|---|---|---|
| 1. | "Little Busters! (DJ Shimamura Remix)" (Lyrics by Jun Maeda; Performed by Rita) | Jun Maeda | DJ Shimamura | 5:58 |
| 2. | "Ring Ring Ring! (Kōki Izumi Remix)" | Jun Maeda | Kōki Izumi | 6:01 |
| 3. | "Shitō wa Rinzen Narite (LiLA'c Remix)" (死闘は凛然なりて Commanding Struggle to the Death) | Shinji Orito | Irus | 7:54 |
| 4. | "Sunday Morning Dance (Groovetune Remix)" | Jun'ichi Shimizu | Groovetune | 5:57 |
| 5. | "Adagio for Summer Wind (DJ Sharpnel's bass:drive remix)" | Jun'ichi Shimizu | DJ Sharpnel | 4:52 |
| 6. | "August Green (M-K-S mix)" | Jun'ichi Shimizu | Longfi | 5:59 |
| 7. | "One's Future (Dee!'s Speedking Remix)" (Lyrics by Kai; Performed by Miyako Suzuta) | Jun'ichi Shimizu | Dee! | 6:17 |
| 8. | "Hoshikuzu (Sumijun Remix)" (星屑 Stardust) (Lyrics by Chika Shirokiri; Performed by Haruka Shimotsuki) | Jun'ichi Shimizu | Sumijun | 6:54 |
| 9. | "Saya's Song (NTMGmix)" (Lyrics by Jun Maeda; Performed by Lia) | Jun Maeda | Baker | 5:06 |
| 10. | "Alicemagic (Muzik Servant Remix)" (Lyrics by Jun Maeda; Performed by Rita) | Shinji Orito | Muzik Servant | 5:22 |
| Total length: | | | | 60:20 |

=== Ripresa ===
Ripresa is a piano arrange album with songs taken from the Little Busters!, Little Busters! Ecstasy and Kud Wafter visual novels and arranged into piano versions. It was released on April 26, 2013, in Japan by Key Sounds Label bearing the catalog number KSLA-0089. The album contains one disc with ten tracks, eight of which are from Little Busters! and Ecstasy and the other two, tracks 5 and 9, are from Kud Wafter. The album is composed and produced by Jun Maeda, PMMK and Jun'ichi Shimizu; tracks are arranged by Keiji Inai and Manyo.

Track listing
| No. | Title | Music | Length |
|---|---|---|---|
| 1. | "Boys Don't Cry" | Jun Maeda | 4:37 |
| 2. | "Little Busters!" | Jun Maeda | 4:55 |
| 3. | "Mahō no Ensemble" (魔法のアンサンブル Magic Ensemble) | PMMK | 4:49 |
| 4. | "Exotic Toybox" (えきぞちっく・といぼっくす Ekizochikku Toibokkusu) | PMMK | 3:12 |
| 5. | "One's Future" | Jun'ichi Shimizu | 5:10 |
| 6. | "Tatta Hitotsu no Mahō no Kotoba" (たったひとつの魔法の言葉 Only One Magic Word) | PMMK | 5:05 |
| 7. | "Haruka Kanata" (遥か彼方 Faraway) | Jun Maeda | 4:38 |
| 8. | "Saya's Song" | Jun Maeda | 5:38 |
| 9. | "Hoshikuzu" (星屑 Stardust) | Jun'ichi Shimizu | 4:57 |
| 10. | "Let's Return" (れっつ・りたーん Rettsu Ritān) | Jun Maeda | 3:51 |
| Total length: | | | 46:52 |

=== Little Busters! Refrain Original Soundtrack ===
Little Busters! Refrain Original Soundtrack is an original soundtrack containing music tracks featured in the Little Busters! Refrain anime series and was first released on December 29, 2013, at Comiket 85 in Japan by Key Sounds Label bearing the catalog number KSLA-0094. The soundtrack contains one disc with 17 tracks composed, arranged, and produced by Jun Maeda, Shinji Orito, Magome Togoshi, Ryō Mizutsuki, Manack, Kenichirō Iwasaki, Manyo, Nishi-ken and MintJam. Rita sings three songs: "Little Busters! EX (TV Size)", "Little Busters! (TV animation ver.) (TV Size)" and "Alicemagic (TV animation ver.) (TV Size)". Suzuyu sings two songs: "Boys be Smile (TV Size)" and "Mezameta Asa ni wa Kimi ga Tonari ni (TV Size)". Ayaka Kitazawa sings "Kimi to no Nakushimi Mono (TV Size)".

Track listing
| No. | Title | Music | Arrangement | Length |
|---|---|---|---|---|
| 1. | "Boys be Smile (TV Size)" (Lyrics by Jun Maeda; Performed by Suzuyu) | Jun Maeda | Manyo | 1:35 |
| 2. | "Calm days" | Shinji Orito | Shinji Orito | 2:20 |
| 3. | "Day-to-day" | Ryō Mizutsuki | Ryō Mizutsuki | 2:39 |
| 4. | "Soko ni, Kimi ga Iru Dake de." (そこに、きみがいるだけで。 Just From You Being There.) | Ryō Mizutsuki | Ryō Mizutsuki | 6:02 |
| 5. | "Gogo no Gairoju" (午後の街路樹 Roadside Trees in the Afternoon) | Manack | Manack | 2:17 |
| 6. | "The other side of chaos" | Kenichirō Iwasaki | Kenichirō Iwasaki | 2:19 |
| 7. | "Days of tears and lilies" | Manack | Manack | 2:48 |
| 8. | "Recollect" | Ryō Mizutsuki | Ryō Mizutsuki | 3:29 |
| 9. | "Crisis" (クライシス Kuraishisu) | Manack | Manack | 2:07 |
| 10. | "Zawameki" (ざわめき Noisy) | Ryō Mizutsuki | Ryō Mizutsuki | 2:55 |
| 11. | "Ashita e no Michishirube" (明日への道標 Guidepost to Tomorrow) | Manack | Manack | 2:37 |
| 12. | "Kimi to no Nakushi Mono (TV Size)" (君とのなくしもの) (Lyrics by Yūto Tonokawa; Performed by Ayaka Kitazawa) | Shinji Orito | Nishi-ken | 1:32 |
| 13. | "Little Busters! EX (TV Size)" (Lyrics by Jun Maeda; Performed by Rita) | Jun Maeda | MintJam | 1:32 |
| 14. | "Mezameta Asa ni wa Kimi ga Tonari ni (TV Size)" (目覚めた朝にはきみが隣に Waking Up In The Morning With You) (Lyrics by Jun Maeda; Performed by Suzuyu) | Jun Maeda | Manyo | 1:49 |
| 15. | "Yūsōnaru Tatakai (Remix)" (勇壮なる闘い Heroic Battle) | Magome Togoshi | Magome Togoshi | 1:57 |
| 16. | "Little Busters! (TV animation ver.) (TV Size)" (Lyrics by Jun Maeda; Performed by Rita) | Jun Maeda | MintJam | 1:40 |
| 17. | "Alicemagic (TV animation ver.) (TV Size)" (Lyrics by Yūto Tonokawa; Performed by Rita) | Shinji Orito | MintJam | 1:36 |
| Total length: | | | | 41:14 |

=== Little Busters! Perfect Vocal Collection ===
Little Busters! Perfect Vocal Collection is a compilation album of vocal music featured in the Little Busters! and Little Busters! Ecstasy visual novels and their anime adaptations. It was first released on April 29, 2014, at the Character1 exhibition in Japan by Key Sounds Label bearing the catalog numbers KSLA-0095–0096. It was later re-released for general sale on August 8, 2014. The album contains two discs with 23 tracks composed, arranged, and produced by Jun Maeda, Shinji Orito, PMMK, Leo Kashida, Luka, Manack, Manyo, MintJam, Nishi-ken, Terra, Arm, VWN, dj Aura Qualic, Yū Hagiwara and Anant-Garde Eyes. Singers on the album include: Ayaka Kitazawa, Lia, Rita, Harumi Sakurai, Keiko Suzuki, Suzuyu and Tomoe Tamiyasu.

Disc 1
| No. | Title | Lyrics | Music | Artist / Arrangement | Length |
|---|---|---|---|---|---|
| 1. | "Little Busters!" | Jun Maeda | Jun Maeda | Rita / I've Sound | 4:48 |
| 2. | "Rin no Hisoka na Koi no Uta" (鈴の密かな恋の唄 Rin's Secret Love Song) | Jun Maeda | Jun Maeda | Tomoe Tamiyasu / Terra | 4:40 |
| 3. | "Pickles o Oishikusuru Tsukurikata" (ピクルスをおいしくするつくりかた How to Make Pickles Delicious) | Chika Shirokiri | PMMK | Keiko Suzuki / Manyo | 4:21 |
| 4. | "Saya no Nemureru Requiem" (沙耶の眠れるレクイエム Saya's Sleepy Requiem) | Jun Maeda | Jun Maeda | Harumi Sakurai / dj Aura Qualic | 6:36 |
| 5. | "Jupinyā" (じゅぴにゃー) | Jun Maeda | Gustav Holst | Tomoe Tamiyasu / VWN | 2:29 |
| 6. | "Haruka Kanata" (遥か彼方 Faraway) | Jun Maeda | Jun Maeda | Rita / Manack | 5:41 |
| 7. | "Raison" | Chika Shirokiri | Shinji Orito | Keiko Suzuki / Manyo | 5:33 |
| 8. | "Mission:Love sniper" | Jun Maeda | Arm, Jun Maeda | Tomoe Tamiyasu / Arm | 5:49 |
| 9. | "Neko to Garasu to Marui Tsuki" (猫と硝子と円い月 Cat, Glass, and the Round Moon) | Jun Maeda | Jun Maeda | Tomoe Tamiyasu / Manack | 4:39 |
| 10. | "Amenochi Hare" (雨のち晴れ Clear Weather After the Rain) | Leo Kashida | PMMK | Rita / PMMK | 5:33 |
| 11. | "Song for friends" | Jun Maeda | Jun Maeda | Rita / MintJam | 5:15 |
| 12. | "Alicemagic (Rockstar ver.)" | Yūto Tonokawa | Shinji Orito | Rita / MintJam | 4:46 |

Disc 2
| No. | Title | Lyrics | Music | Artist / Arrangement | Length |
|---|---|---|---|---|---|
| 1. | "Little Busters! (TV animation ver.)" | Jun Maeda | Jun Maeda | Rita / MintJam | 4:34 |
| 2. | "Alicemagic (TV animation ver.)" | Yūto Tonokawa | Shinji Orito | Rita / MintJam | 4:35 |
| 3. | "Hanabi" | Jun Maeda | Jun Maeda | Lia / Yū Hagiwara | 6:35 |
| 4. | "Bokura no Tabi" (僕らの旅 Our Journey) | Leo Kashida | Shinji Orito | Ayaka Kitazawa / Luka | 4:47 |
| 5. | "Little Busters! Synth-Magnetic Megamix" (リトルバスターズ! Ritoru Basutāzu!) | | Jun Maeda, Shinji Orito, PMMK | Manack | 7:25 |
| 6. | "Boys be Smile" | Jun Maeda | Jun Maeda | Suzuyu / Manyo | 4:29 |
| 7. | "Mezameta Asa ni wa Kimi ga Tonari ni" (目覚めた朝にはきみが隣に) | Jun Maeda | Jun Maeda | Suzuyu / Manyo | 4:39 |
| 8. | "Saya's Song" | Jun Maeda | Jun Maeda | Lia / Anant-Garde Eyes | 5:05 |
| 9. | "Namidairo no Tsubasa" (涙色の翼) | Leo Kashida | Shinji Orito | Ayaka Kitazawa / MintJam | 4:43 |
| 10. | "Kimi to no Nakushi Mono" (君とのなくしもの) | Yūto Tonokawa | Shinji Orito | Ayaka Kitazawa / Nishi-ken | 4:20 |
| 11. | "Boys be Smile (Remix)" | Jun Maeda | Jun Maeda | Suzuyu | 4:52 |
| Total length: | | | | | 116:14 |

== Singles ==
=== Little Busters! ===
"Little Busters!" (リトルバスターズ!, Ritoru Basutāzu!) is a maxi single from the visual novel Little Busters! containing three of the game's theme songs sung by Rita and was first released on May 25, 2007, by Key Sounds Label bearing the catalog number KSLA-0028. The single contains one disc with six tracks in regular and off-vocal versions. The song "Little Busters!" is the opening theme of Little Busters!; "Haruka Kanata" is an insert song; and "Alicemagic" is one of the ending themes. The single is composed, arranged, and produced by Jun Maeda, Shinji Orito, Yūto Tonokawa, I've Sound, Manack, and members of MintJam.

Track listing
| No. | Title | Music | Arrangement | Length |
|---|---|---|---|---|
| 1. | "Little Busters!" (Lyrics by Jun Maeda; Performed by Rita) | Jun Maeda | I've Sound | 4:48 |
| 2. | "Haruka Kanata" (遥か彼方 Faraway) (Lyrics by Jun Maeda; Performed by Rita) | Jun Maeda | Manack | 5:39 |
| 3. | "Alicemagic" (Lyrics by Yūto Tonokawa; Performed by Rita) | Shinji Orito | MintJam | 4:37 |
| 4. | "Little Busters! (off vocal)" | Jun Maeda | I've Sound | 4:48 |
| 5. | "Haruka Kanata (off vocal)" (遥か彼方 Faraway) | Jun Maeda | Manack | 5:39 |
| 6. | "Alicemagic (off vocal)" | Shinji Orito | MintJam | 4:37 |
| Total length: | | | | 30:08 |

=== Rin no Hisoka na Koi no Uta / Mission:Love sniper ===
"Rin no Hisoka na Koi no Uta (鈴の密かな恋の唄) / Mission:Love sniper" is an image song single for the Little Busters! visual novel, and was first released on December 28, 2007, at Comiket 73 in Japan by Key Sounds Label bearing the catalog number KSLA-0038, and was re-released on August 15, 2008. The single is for the main heroine Rin Natsume in the game, and contains one disc with four tracks sung by Tomoe Tamiya, the voice actress of Rin. The song "Mission:Love sniper" uses the same tune as Rin's theme song from the game, "Ring Ring Ring!". The single is composed, arranged, and produced by Jun Maeda, Arm of IOSYS, and members of MintJam. Track three was originally composed by Gustav Holst under the title "Jupiter, the Bringer of Jollity" from his orchestral suite The Planets. The track is called "Jupinyā" on the single as a portmanteau of "Jupiter" and the Japanese onomatopoeia for the sound of a cat meowing, "nya".

All lyrics are written by Jun Maeda.

Track listing
| No. | Title | Music | Arrangement | Length |
|---|---|---|---|---|
| 1. | "Rin no Hisoka na Koi no Uta" (鈴の密かな恋の唄 Rin's Secret Love Song) | Jun Maeda | Terra | 4:27 |
| 2. | "Mission:Love sniper" | Arm, Jun Maeda | Arm | 5:48 |
| 3. | "Jupinyā" (じゅぴにゃー) | Gustav Holst | VWN | 2:29 |
| 4. | "Rin no Hisoka na Koi no Uta (my style remix)" (鈴の密かな恋の唄 Rin's Secret Love Song) | Jun Maeda | Setzer | 5:23 |
| Total length: | | | | 18:07 |

=== Saya no Nemureru Requiem / Saya's Song ===
"Saya no Nemureru Requiem (沙耶の眠れるレクイエム) / Saya's Song" is an image song single for the Little Busters! Ecstasy visual novel, and was first be released on February 28, 2009, in Japan by Key Sounds Label bearing the catalog number KSLA-0047 at Key 10th Memorial Fes, an event held in commemoration of Key's ten-year anniversary. The single is for the heroine Saya Tokido, and contains one disc with five tracks sung by Harumi Sakurai, the voice actress of Saya.

All tracks are written by Jun Maeda.

Track listing
| No. | Title | Arrangement | Length |
|---|---|---|---|
| 1. | "Saya no Nemureru Requiem" (沙耶の眠れるレクイエム Saya's Sleepy Requiem) | dj Aura Qualic | 6:34 |
| 2. | "Saya's Song (Saya's Ver)" | PMMK | 5:02 |
| 3. | "Saya no Nemureru Requiem (Elektro Sphere Mix)" (沙耶の眠れるレクイエム Saya's Sleepy Requiem) | Dee! | 6:46 |
| 4. | "Saya no Nemureru Requiem (Muzikservant ReMix)" (沙耶の眠れるレクイエム Saya's Sleepy Requiem) | Muzik Servant | 5:41 |
| 5. | "Saya no Nemureru Requiem (Groovetune Remix)" (沙耶の眠れるレクイエム Saya's Sleepy Requiem) | Groovetune | 6:46 |
| Total length: | | | 30:49 |

=== Raison / Pickles o Oishikusuru Tsukurikata ===
"Raison / Pickles o Oishikusuru Tsukurikata" (ピクルスをおいしくするつくりかた) is an image song single for the Little Busters! Ecstasy visual novel, and was first released on December 29, 2009 at Comiket 77 in Japan by Key Sounds Label bearing the catalog number KSLA-0049. The single is for the heroine Kanata Futaki, and contains two tracks sung by Keiko Suzuki, the voice actress of Kanata. Three of the tracks are short drama monologues of Keiko Suzuki playing Kanata.

All lyrics are written by Chika Shirokiri.

Track listing
| No. | Title | Music | Arrangement | Length |
|---|---|---|---|---|
| 1. | "Kanata Talk 'Joshiryō nite (I)'" (Kanata Talk「女子寮にて(I)」 Kanata Talk 'At the Girl's Dormitory (I)') | | | 0:27 |
| 2. | "Raison" | Shinji Orito | Manyo | 5:30 |
| 3. | "Kanata Talk 'Joshiryō nite (II)'" (Kanata Talk「女子寮にて(II)」 Kanata Talk 'At the Girl's Dormitory (II)') | | | 1:54 |
| 4. | "Pickles o Oishikusuru Tsukurikata" (ピクルスをおいしくするつくりかた How to Make Pickles Delicious) | PMMK | Manyo | 4:08 |
| 5. | "Kanata Talk 'Tōi Machi no Apartment nite'" (Kanata Talk「遠い街のアパートにて」 Kanata Talk 'At a Distant Neighborhood Apartment') | | | 2:12 |
| 6. | "Raison (off vocal)" | Shinji Orito | Manyo | 5:32 |
| 7. | "Pickles o Oishikusuru Tsukurikata (off vocal)" (ピクルスをおいしくするつくりかた How to Make Pickles Delicious) | PMMK | Manyo | 4:09 |
| Total length: | | | | 23:52 |

=== Neko to Garasu to Marui Tsuki / Alicemagic (Aroma Tablet mix) ===
"Neko to Garasu to Marui Tsuki (猫と硝子と円い月) / Alicemagic (Aroma Tablet mix)" is an image song single for the Little Busters! Ecstasy visual novel, and was first released on December 29, 2009, at Comiket 77 in Japan by Key Sounds Label bearing the catalog number KSLA-0050. The single is for the heroine Sasami Sasasegawa, and contains tracks sung by Tomoe Tamiyasu, the voice actress of Sasami. "Neko to Garasu to Marui Tsuki" (猫と硝子と円い月, Cat, Glass, and the Round Moon) is Sasami's leitmotif in Little Busters! Ecstasy, and "Alicemagic" is originally one of the ending themes from the visual novel. Two of the tracks are short dramas.

All lyrics are written by Yūto Tonokawa.

Track listing
| No. | Title | Music | Arrangement | Length |
|---|---|---|---|---|
| 1. | "Neko to Garasu to Marui Tsuki" (猫と硝子と円い月 Cat, Glass, and the Round Moon) | Jun Maeda | Manack | 4:36 |
| 2. | "'Sa' no Aru Seikatsu (Toiu ka Sore Bakari)" (「さ」のある生活～というかそればかり～ Living With 'Sa' (Or Rather Only That)) | | | 1:16 |
| 3. | "Alicemagic (Aroma Tablet mix)" | Shinji Orito | Manack | 5:11 |
| 4. | "'Sa' no Aru Seikatsu (Shōraijō no Na ni 'Sa' wa Irenai)" (「さ」のある生活～将来娘の名に「さ」は入れない～ Living With 'Sa' ('Sa' Will No Longer Be Needed in the Girl's Name)) | | | 1:28 |
| 5. | "Neko to Garasu to Marui Tsuki (off vocal)" (猫と硝子と円い月 Cat, Glass, and the Round Moon) | Jun Maeda | Manack | 4:37 |
| 6. | "Alicemagic (Aroma Tablet mix off vocal)" | Shinji Orito | Manack | 5:12 |
| Total length: | | | | 22:20 |

=== Little Busters! (TV animation ver.) / Alicemagic (TV animation ver.) ===
"Little Busters! (TV animation ver.) / Alicemagic (TV animation ver.)" is a single for the Little Busters! anime series by J.C.Staff, which was released on October 31, 2012, in Japan by Key Sounds Label bearing either the catalog number KSLA-0087 or KSLA-0088 depending on the edition. The former is for the limited edition, which came bundled with a DVD containing non-credit opening and ending videos for the anime, and the latter is for the regular edition. The single contains the opening and ending themes from the anime version in full length, TV length, and off-vocal versions. The opening theme is "Little Busters! (TV animation ver.)" and the ending theme is "Alicemagic (TV animation ver.)", both sung by Rita. Both songs are remixes of the theme songs featured in the original visual novel. The single is composed, arranged, and produced by Jun Maeda, Shinji Orito and Yūto Tonokawa.

Track listing
| No. | Title | Music | Arrangement | Length |
|---|---|---|---|---|
| 1. | "Little Busters! (TV animation ver.)" (Lyrics by Jun Maeda; Performed by Rita) | Jun Maeda | MintJam | 4:33 |
| 2. | "Alicemagic (TV animation ver.)" (Lyrics by Yūto Tonokawa; Performed by Rita) | Shinji Orito | MintJam | 4:34 |
| 3. | "Little Busters! (TV animation ver.) (TV Size)" (Lyrics by Jun Maeda; Performed by Rita) | Jun Maeda | MintJam | 1:36 |
| 4. | "Alicemagic (TV animation ver.) (TV Size)" (Lyrics by Yūto Tonokawa; Performed by Rita) | Shinji Orito | MintJam | 1:33 |
| 5. | "Little Busters! (TV animation ver.) (Instrumental)" | Jun Maeda | MintJam | 4:33 |
| 6. | "Alicemagic (TV animation ver.) (Instrumental)" | Shinji Orito | MintJam | 4:34 |
| Total length: | | | | 21:23 |

=== Boys be Smile / Mezameta Asa ni wa Kimi ga Tonari ni ===
"Boys be Smile / Mezameta Asa ni wa Kimi ga Tonari ni" (目覚めた朝にはきみが隣に) is a single for the Little Busters! Refrain anime series by J.C.Staff, which was released on October 23, 2013 in Japan by Key Sounds Label bearing the catalog number KSLA-0092. The single contains the opening theme "Boys be Smile" from the anime sung by Suzuyu in full length, TV length, and off-vocal versions. The single is composed, arranged, and produced by Jun Maeda and Manyo.

All tracks are written by Jun Maeda, and arranged by Manyo.

Track listing
| No. | Title | Length |
|---|---|---|
| 1. | "Boys be Smile" | 4:27 |
| 2. | "Mezameta Asa ni wa Kimi ga Tonari ni" (目覚めた朝にはきみが隣に) | 4:38 |
| 3. | "Boys be Smile (TV Size)" | 1:33 |
| 4. | "Mezameta Asa ni wa Kimi ga Tonari ni (TV Size)" (目覚めた朝にはきみが隣に) | 1:48 |
| 5. | "Boys be Smile (Instrumental)" | 4:29 |
| 6. | "Mezameta Asa ni wa Kimi ga Tonari ni (Instrumental)" (目覚めた朝にはきみが隣に) | 4:39 |
| Total length: | | 21:34 |

=== Kimi to no Nakushi Mono / Namidairo no Tsubasa ===
"Kimi to no Nakushi Mono / Namidairo no Tsubasa" (君とのなくしもの / 涙色の翼) is a single for the Little Busters! Refrain anime series by J.C.Staff, which was released on November 6, 2013, in Japan by Key Sounds Label bearing the catalog number KSLA-0093. The single contains the ending theme "Kimi to no Nakushi Mono" from the anime sung by Ayaka Kitazawa in full length, TV length, and off-vocal versions. The single is composed, arranged, and produced by Shinji Orito, Yūto Tonokawa, Leo Kashida, MintJam and Nishi-ken.

All music is composed by Shinji Orito.

Track listing
| No. | Title | Arrangement | Length |
|---|---|---|---|
| 1. | "Kimi to no Nakushi Mono" (君とのなくしもの) (Lyrics by Yūto Tonokawa) | Nishi-ken | 4:18 |
| 2. | "Namidairo no Tsubasa" (涙色の翼) (Lyrics by Leo Kashida) | MintJam | 4:40 |
| 3. | "Kimi to no Nakushi Mono (TV Size)" (君とのなくしもの) (Lyrics by Yūto Tonokawa) | Nishi-ken | 1:30 |
| 4. | "Kimi to no Nakushi Mono (Instrumental)" (君とのなくしもの) | Nishi-ken | 4:18 |
| 5. | "Namidairo no Tsubasa (Instrumental)" (涙色の翼) | MintJam | 4:40 |
| Total length: | | | 19:26 |

== Charts ==
| Albums | Release date | Label | Format | Peak Oricon chart positions |
|---|---|---|---|---|
| "Little Busters!" | May 25, 2007 | Key Sounds Label (KSLA-0028) | CD | 53 |
| Little Busters! Original Soundtrack | August 17, 2007 | Key Sounds Label (KSLA-0033—0035) | CD | 103 |
| "Rin no Hisoka na Koi no Uta / Mission:Love sniper" | December 28, 2007 | Key Sounds Label (KSLA-0038) | CD | 87 |
| Little Busters! Ecstasy Tracks | August 15, 2008 | Key Sounds Label (KSLA-0043) | CD | 143 |
| "Little Busters! / Alicemagic" | October 31, 2012 | Key Sounds Label (KSLA-0087, KSLA-0088) | CD, CD+DVD | 8 |
| "Boys be Smile / Mezameta Asa ni wa Kimi ga Tonari ni" | October 23, 2013 | Key Sounds Label (KSLA-0092) | CD | 15 |
| "Kimi to no Nakushi Mono / Namidairo no Tsubasa" | November 6, 2013 | Key Sounds Label (KSLA-0093) | CD | 28 |
