= Music of Planetarian =

Soundtrack music for the Japanese visual novel Planetarian

Planetarian: The Reverie of a Little Planet Planetarian: Storyteller of the Stars Planetarian: Snow Globe discography
- Extended plays: 1
- Soundtrack albums: 3
- Singles: 2

Planetarian: The Reverie of a Little Planet is a visual novel developed by Key and published by VisualArt's and KineticNovel in 2004. The story centers around a middle-aged man who comes across a malfunctioning robot in a dead city. The man, known simply as "the junker", stays with this robot for a time and attempts to fix the projector of the planetarium where the story takes place. It was adapted by David Production into an original net animation (OVA) series and an animated film titled Planetarian: Storyteller of the Stars in 2016. An OVA titled Planetarian: Snow Globe animated by Okuruto Noboru was produced in 2021, and Key also released a visual novel version of Snow Globe in 2021. The core of the discography is the original soundtrack album produced by Key Sounds Label in 2006 for the visual novel. The music on the soundtrack was mainly composed and arranged by Magome Togoshi. A second soundtrack and two singles for the anime adaptations by David Production were released in 2016. An EP for Planetarian was released in 2017 featuring music from the visual novel and anime adaptations by David Production. A soundtrack for the Snow Globe OVA and visual novel was released in 2021.

== Albums ==
=== Planetarian Original Soundtrack ===
The Planetarian Original Soundtrack, from the visual novel Planetarian: The Reverie of a Little Planet, was released on August 11, 2006, at Comiket 70 by Key Sounds Label bearing the catalog number KSLA-0025; it was later re-released on December 28, 2006. The soundtrack contains one disc totaling twelve songs composed, arranged, and produced by Magome Togoshi, and Shinji Orito; themes originally composed by Charles Crozat Converse and Kenji Miyazawa were remixed on the soundtrack. Aside from the songs in the game like "Gentle Jena" and "Hoshi no Sekai (Opening)", the soundtrack includes new songs such as an arranged vocal version of "Hoshi Meguri no Uta", sung by Mell. The musical tracks played at the beginning and the end of the game (tracks one and eight in the original soundtrack) are rearrangements of the hymn "What a Friend We Have in Jesus" by Charles Crozat Converse, and their titles reflect this as well: "Hoshi no Sekai (Opening)" refers to the Japanese version of the hymn, named "Hoshi no Yo", and "Itsukushimi Fukaki" is the Japanese translation of the hymn's original title.

All songs arranged by Magome Togoshi, except where noted.

Track listing
No.	Title	Music	Length
1.	"Hoshi no Sekai (Opening)" (星の世界 World of Stars)	Charles Crozat Converse	0:59
2.	"Hoshi Meguri no Uta (Honky Tonk)" (星めぐりの歌 Song of the Pilgrimage of the Stars)	Kenji Miyazawa	1:47
3.	"Hoshi Meguri no Uta (Metronome)" (星めぐりの歌 Song of the Pilgrimage of the Stars)	Kenji Miyazawa	1:59
4.	"Ame to Robot" (雨とロボット Rain and Robot)	Magome Togoshi	1:38
5.	"Hoshi Meguri no Uta (Winter's Tale)" (星めぐりの歌 Song of the Pilgrimage of the Stars)	Kenji Miyazawa	2:59
6.	"Gentle Jena"	Magome Togoshi	3:37
7.	"Mattaki Hito" (全き人 Perfect Human)	Magome Togoshi	2:54
8.	"Itsukushimi Fukaki" (慈しみ深き Deep Affection)	Charles Crozat Converse	2:47
9.	"Hoshi Meguri no Uta" (星めぐりの歌 Song of Circling Stars) (Lyrics by Kenji Miyazawa; Performed by Mell)	Kenji Miyazawa	4:26
10.	"Gentle Jena (Extended Version)"	Magome Togoshi	6:53
11.	"Human Warrior" (Arrangement by Shinji Orito)	Shinji Orito	5:11
12.	"Hoshi Meguri no Uta (Short Version)" (星めぐりの歌 Song of Circling Stars) (Lyrics by Kenji Miyazawa; Performed by Mell)	Kenji Miyazawa	2:56
Total length:			38:06

=== Planetarian Original Soundtrack ===
Planetarian Original Soundtrack is a soundtrack containing music tracks featured in the Planetarian original net animation series and the film Planetarian: Storyteller of the Stars by David Production. It was released on October 26, 2016, in Japan by Key Sounds Label bearing the catalog numbers KSLA-0122–0123. The soundtrack is composed, arranged, and produced by Shinji Orito, Magome Togoshi, Donmaru, Tomohiro Takeshita, Ryō Mizutsuki and Shōji Morifuji.

Disc 1
No.	Title	Music	Arrangement	Length
1.	"Hoshi no Sekai (Introduction)" (星の世界)	Charles Crozat Converse	Shinji Orito	2:27
2.	"Fūin Toshi" (封印都市)	Tomohiro Takeshita	Tomohiro Takeshita	1:33
3.	"Tansaku" (探索)	Donmaru	Donmaru	2:02
4.	"Hoshi no Sekai (Constant Rain)" (星の世界)	Charles Crozat Converse	Ryō Mizutsuki	3:08
5.	"Hoshi Meguri no Uta (Planetarium Hall)" (星めぐりの歌)	Kenji Miyazawa	Ryō Mizutsuki	2:05
6.	"Taisetsu na Partner" (大切なパートナー Taisetsu na Pātonā)	Shinji Orito	Shinji Orito	0:22
7.	"Hoshi no Sekai (Piano Minor Chord D)" (星の世界)	Charles Crozat Converse	Shinji Orito, Shōji Morifuji	2:35
8.	"Kuchiru Sekai" (朽ちる世界)	Tomohiro Takeshita	Tomohiro Takeshita	1:21
9.	"Hoshi no Sekai (Piano Minor Chord B)" (星の世界)	Charles Crozat Converse	Shinji Orito, Shōji Morifuji	2:04
10.	"Yumemi no Kioku" (ゆめみの記憶)	Shinji Orito	Shinji Orito	2:13
11.	"Tōeiki Shuri (Hoshi no Sekai yori)" (投影機修理（星の世界 より）)	Charles Crozat Converse	Shōji Morifuji	2:36
12.	"Gentle Jena (Starlit Night)"	Magome Togoshi	Shinji Orito	2:27
13.	"Haruka Sora e (Hoshi no Fune yori)" (遥か空へ（星の舟 より）)	Shinji Orito	Shōyu	3:18
14.	"Kasuka na Kioku" (微かな記憶)	Tomohiro Takeshita	Tomohiro Takeshita	2:05
15.	"Hoshi Meguri no Uta (Earnest Wish)" (星めぐりの歌)	Kenji Miyazawa	Ryō Mizutsuki	2:27
16.	"Futari Dake no Machi" (ふたりだけの街)	Donmaru	Donmaru	1:35
17.	"Hoshi no Sekai (Piano Major Chord C)" (星の世界)	Charles Crozat Converse	Shōji Morifuji	2:09
18.	"Shi no Katachi" (死のかたち)	Tomohiro Takeshita	Tomohiro Takeshita	1:21
19.	"Kuzuya no Ketsui" (屑屋の決意)	Tomohiro Takeshita	Tomohiro Takeshita	1:28
20.	"Männchen Jäger" (戦闘機械)	Shinji Orito	Shinji Orito	2:16
21.	"Human Warrior"	Shinji Orito	Shinji Orito	5:05
22.	"Yumemi to no Wakare (Hoshi no Sekai yori)" (ゆめみとの別れ（星の世界 より）)	Charles Crozat Converse	Ryō Mizutsuki	3:42
23.	"Hoshi Meguri no Uta" (星めぐりの歌) (Lyrics by Kenji Miyazawa; Performed by Mell)	Kenji Miyazawa	Magome Togoshi	4:35
24.	"Twinkle Starlight (Short ver)" (Lyrics by Tōya Okano; Performed by Sayaka Sasaki)	Donmaru	Shōji Morifuji	2:06

Disc 2
No.	Title	Music	Arrangement	Length
1.	"Owarikake no Sekai" (終わりかけの世界)	Shinji Orito	Shinji Orito	2:16
2.	"Levi, Job, Ruth" (レビ・ヨブ・ルツ Rebi, Yobu, Rutsu)	Tomohiro Takeshita	Tomohiro Takeshita	1:29
3.	"Chitei no Chitsujo" (地底の秩序)	Tomohiro Takeshita	Mineshi Wong	1:58
4.	"Hoshi no Sekai (Piano Major Chord B)" (星の世界)	Charles Crozat Converse	Shōji Morifuji	2:00
5.	"Hoshi no Benkyō" (星の勉強)	Shinji Orito	Shinji Orito	2:15
6.	"Kaikō" (邂逅)	Donmaru	Donmaru	1:41
7.	"Rōjin no Yume" (老人の夢)	Donmaru	Donmaru	2:16
8.	"Tabi no Owari" (旅の終わり)	Tomohiro Takeshita	Tomohiro Takeshita	1:17
9.	"Hoshi no Sekai (Piano Minor Chord A)" (星の世界)	Charles Crozat Converse	Shinji Orito, Shōji Morifuji	1:55
10.	"Mattaki Hito" (全き人)	Magome Togoshi	Shinji Orito	2:30
11.	"Tomatta Jikan" (止まった時間)	Donmaru	Donmaru	1:49
12.	"Maisō" (埋葬)	Shinji Orito	Shinji Orito	2:40
13.	"Hoshi no Fune (Edit ver)" (星の舟) (Lyrics by Tōya Okano; Performed by Lia)	Shinji Orito	Takayuki Negishi	3:07
14.	"Hoshi no Sekai (Piano Major Chord A)" (星の世界)	Charles Crozat Converse	Shōji Morifuji	2:00
15.	"Worlds Pain (Edit ver)" (Lyrics by Kai; Performed by Ceui)	Tomohiro Takeshita	Tomohiro Takeshita	1:29
16.	"Gentle Jena (Vocal Edit ver)" (Lyrics by Ryō Mizutsuki; Performed by Ayaka Kitazawa)	Magome Togoshi	Shōji Morifuji	4:00
Total length:				91:42

=== Planetarian Analog Collector's Edition ===
Planetarian Analog Collector's Edition is an EP to be released on a gramophone record for the Planetarian visual novel and anime adaptations. A crowdfunding campaign for the record ran from May 22 to June 25, 2017, and it reached its goal of ¥1 million in under 12 hours. The campaign ultimately raised ¥3,393,500. It was released in September 2017 by Key Sounds Label bearing the catalog number KSLA-0142. The EP features music previously released for Planetarian, but also includes a new remix of "Twinkle Starlight". The EP is composed, arranged, and produced by Shinji Orito, Magome Togoshi, Donmaru, Tomohiro Takeshita, Shōji Morifuji and Takayuki Negishi. The vocal pieces are sung by Mell, Lia, Sayaka Sasaki and Ceui.

Side A
No.	Title	Lyrics	Music	Arrangement	Length
1.	"Human Warrior"		Shinji Orito	Shinji Orito
2.	"Twinkle Starlight Remix" (Performed by Sayaka Sasaki)	Tōya Okano	Donmaru
3.	"Worlds Pain" (Performed by Ceui)	Kai	Tomohiro Takeshita	Tomohiro Takeshita
4.	"Gentle Jena"		Magome Togoshi

Side B
No.	Title	Lyrics	Music	Arrangement	Length
1.	"Hoshi Meguri no Uta" (星めぐりの歌) (Performed by Mell)	Kenji Miyazawa	Kenji Miyazawa	Magome Togoshi
2.	"Twinkle Starlight" (Performed by Sayaka Sasaki)	Tōya Okano	Donmaru	Shōji Morifuji
3.	"Hoshi no Fune" (星の舟) (Performed by Lia)	Tōya Okano	Shinji Orito	Takayuki Negishi

=== Planetarian: Snow Globe Original Sound Tracks & Voice Drama CD ===
Planetarian: Snow Globe Original Sound Tracks & Voice Drama CD s a soundtrack containing music tracks featured in the Planetarian: Snow Globe original video animation by Okuruto Noboru and visual novel by Key. It was released in January 2021 for backers of the Planetarian: Snow Globe crowdfunding campaign who pledged at least ¥13,640 bearing the catalog number KAXA-9935CD. The soundtrack is composed, arranged, and produced by Shinji Orito, Donmaru and Ryō Mizutsuki. "Snow Globe" is sung by Riko Azuna, "Twinkle Starlight (Hoshino Yumemi Ver.)" is sung by Keiko Suzuki, and "Star trip" is sung by Sayaka Sasaki.

Track listing
No.	Title	Music	Arrangement	Length
1.	"Hoshi no Sekai -Starlit Sky-" (星の世界 World of Stars)	Charles Crozat Converse	Shinji Orito	0:58
2.	"Hajimete no Partner" (初めてのパートナー My First Partner)	Donmaru	Donmaru	3:44
3.	"Kawaranai Hibi" (変わらない日々 Unchanging Days)	Shinji Orito	Shinji Orito	2:43
4.	"Hoshi no Sekai -Late Show-" (星の世界 World of Stars)	Charles Crozat Converse	Shinji Orito	1:37
5.	"Hajimete no Partner -Day Game by-" (初めてのパートナー My First Partner)	Donmaru	Donmaru	2:31
6.	"Satomi no Kigakari" (里美の気懸かり Satomi's Worries)	Shinji Orito	Shinji Orito	0:56
7.	"Namae no Nai Yume -Sunset Down-" (名前のない夢 Nameless Dream)	Donmaru	Donmaru	1:40
8.	"Snow Globe -Under the Snow-" (雪圏球(スノーグローブ) Sunō Gurōbu)	Shinji Orito	Shinji Orito	0:51
9.	"Uchū ni Habataku Jinrui no Yume" (宇宙にはばたく人類の夢 Humanity's Dream to Head Into Space)	Shinji Orito	Shinji Orito	1:27
10.	"Machikado no Sora" (街角の空 Street Corner's Sky)	Donmaru	Donmaru	1:41
11.	"Fuyugeshiki" (冬景色 Winter Landscape)	Shinji Orito	Shinji Orito	3:19
12.	"Static World"	Ryō Mizutsuki	Ryō Mizutsuki	2:16
13.	"Todokanu Koi" (届かぬ恋 Unrequited Love)	Ryō Mizutsuki, Shinji Orito	Ryō Mizutsuki	3:25
14.	"Snow Globe" (Lyrics by Tōya Okano; Performed by Riko Azuna)	Shinji Orito	Shinpei Nasuno	5:32
15.	"Twinkle Starlight (Hoshino Yumemi Ver.)" (Twinkle Starlight ～ほしのゆめみ Ver.～) (Lyrics by Tōya Okano; Performed by Keiko Suzuki)	Donmaru	Shōji Morifuji	5:27
16.	"Star trip" (Lyrics by Tōya Okano; Performed by Sayaka Sasaki)	Donmaru	Shinpei Nasuno	5:05
17.	"Seiza Kaisetsu 'Hoshi o Yomu'" (星座解説 「星を読む」 Constellation Explanation 'Diving the Stars') (Cast: Keiko Suzuki)			16:38
Total length:				59:50

== Singles ==
=== Twinkle Starlight / Worlds Pain ===
"Twinkle Starlight / Worlds Pain" is a single for the Planetarian original net animation series by David Production, which was released on July 27, 2016, in Japan by Key Sounds Label bearing the catalog number KSLA-0117. "Twinkle Starlight" is sung by Sayaka Sasaki and "Worlds Pain" is sung by Ceui. The single is composed, arranged, and produced by Donmaru, Tomohiro Takeshita and Shōji Morifuji.

Track listing
No.	Title	Music	Arrangement	Length
1.	"Twinkle Starlight" (Lyrics by Tōya Okano; Performed by Sayaka Sasaki)	Donmaru	Shōji Morifuji	5:29
2.	"Worlds Pain" (Lyrics by Kai; Performed by Ceui)	Tomohiro Takeshita	Tomohiro Takeshita	4:07
3.	"Twinkle Starlight Short ver." (Lyrics by Tōya Okano; Performed by Sayaka Sasaki)	Donmaru	Shōji Morifuji	2:09
4.	"Twinkle Starlight (Instrumental)"	Donmaru	Shōji Morifuji	5:27
5.	"Worlds Pain (Instrumental)"	Tomohiro Takeshita	Tomohiro Takeshita	4:05
Total length:				21:17

=== Hoshi no Fune / Gentle Jena ===
"Hoshi no Fune (星の舟) / Gentle Jena" is a single for the Planetarian: Storyteller of the Stars film by David Production, which was released on September 21, 2016, in Japan by Key Sounds Label bearing the catalog number KSLA-0119. "Hoshi no Fune" is sung by Lia and "Gentle Jena" is sung by Ayaka Kitazawa. The single is composed, arranged, and produced by Shinji Orito, Magome Togoshi, Takayuki Negishi and Shōji Morifuji.

Track listing
No.	Title	Music	Arrangement	Length
1.	"Hoshi no Fune" (星の舟) (Lyrics by Tōya Okano; Performed by Lia)	Shinji Orito	Takayuki Negishi	6:08
2.	"Gentle Jena" (Lyrics by Ryō Mizutsuki; Performed by Ayaka Kitazawa)	Magome Togoshi	Shōji Morifuji	5:19
3.	"Hoshi no Fune (Instrumental)" (星の舟)	Shinji Orito	Takayuki Negishi	6:07
4.	"Gentle Jena (Instrumental)"	Magome Togoshi	Shōji Morifuji	5:17
Total length:				22:51

== Chart positions ==
Albums	Release date	Label	Format	Peak Oricon chart positions
"Twinkle Starlight / Worlds Pain"	July 27, 2016	Key Sounds Label (KSLA-0117)	CD	48
"Hoshi no Fune / Gentle Jena"	September 21, 2016	Key Sounds Label (KSLA-0119)	CD	26
Planetarian Original Soundtrack	October 26, 2016	Key Sounds Label (KSLA-0122–0123)	CD	61
