= Planetarian: Storyteller of the Stars =

- Theatrical release poster featuring Yumemi Hoshino

Japanese name
- Kanji: planetarian～星の人～
- Literal meaning: Planetarian: Man of the Stars
Transcriptions
- Revised Hepburn: Planetarian: Hoshi no Hito
- Directed by: Naokatsu Tsuda
- Screenplay by: Naokatsu Tsuda; Shogo Yasukawa
- Based on: Planetarian: The Reverie of a Little Planet by Key "Hoshi no Hito" by Yūichi Suzumoto
- Starring: Tamio Ōki; Keiko Suzuki; Daisuke Ono
- Edited by: Kiyoshi Hirose
- Music by: Shinji Orito; Donmaru; Tomohiro Takeshita
- Production company: David Production
- Distributed by: Asmik Ace
- Release date: September 3, 2016
- Running time: 117 minutes
- Country: Japan
- Language: Japanese

Planetarian: Storyteller of the Stars (Japanese: planetarian～星の人～, Hepburn: Planetarian: Hoshi no Hito; literally "Planetarian: Man of the Stars") is a 2016 Japanese animated post-apocalyptic film directed by Naokatsu Tsuda. The film is based on the Planetarian: The Reverie of a Little Planet visual novel by Key and the "Man of the Stars" short story from the Planetarian light novel written by Yūichi Suzumoto. The film was animated by David Production and distributed by Asmik Ace. It premiered in Japanese theaters on September 3, 2016. The story is set in a dystopian future where nuclear warfare has left a once prosperous civilization in complete ruin. The film tells the story of an old man traveling around with a mobile planetarium projector to show people the stars.

== Voice cast ==
| Character | Japanese | English |
|---|---|---|
| Man of the Stars (星の人, Hoshi no Hito) | Tamio Ōki | Kenny Green |
| Yumemi Hoshino (ほしの ゆめみ, Hoshino Yumemi) | Keiko Suzuki | Jill Harris |
| The junker (屑屋, Kuzuya) | Daisuke Ono | David Matranga |
| Levi (レビ, Rebi) | Sanae Fuku | Monica Rial |
| Job (ヨブ, Yobu) | Yōko Hikasa | Terri Doty |
| Ruth (ルツ, Rutsu) | Minami Tsuda | Alison Viktorin |
| Ezra (エズラ, Ezura) | Akiko Takeguchi | Cynthia Cranz |
| Jeremiah (エレミヤ, Eremiya) | Yūki Kuwahara | Dawn M. Bennett |
| Isaiah (イザヤ, Izaya) | Shizuka Ishigami | Alexis Tipton |
| Manager (館長, Kanchō) | Satoshi Taki | Chris Bevins |
| Gorō Mikajima (三ケ島 吾郎, Mikajima Gorō) | Yasumichi Kushida | Cris George |
| Satomi Kurahashi (倉橋 里美, Kurahashi Satomi) | Rina Satō | Colleen Clinkenbeard |
| Older junker (老屑屋, Rō kuzuya) | Masaru Shinozuka | Kent Williams |

== Production ==
Asmik Ace producer Hiroyuki Aoi approached David Production to produce the Planetarian original net animation (ONA) series and the Hoshi no Hito film. According to Aoi, David Production was chosen because of the large amount of respect the studio holds for the original work when they produce an adaptation. Director Naokatsu Tsuda was on the production team that was discussing who the director for both projects should be, and after going through various names, Tsuda nominated himself to be the director in part because he did not want to regret missing the opportunity as a fan of Key's works. Tsuda has been a fan of Key's works since he first discovered Kanon, and he has continued to be influenced by them over the years.

Tsuda also co-wrote the screenplay with Shogo Yasukawa, in addition to drawing up the storyboard. Although Tsuda had once before written the script for an episode of the 2014 anime series JoJo's Bizarre Adventure: Stardust Crusaders which he had also directed, he came to realize while handling the storyboard for Planetarian that he was able to become more immersed into the story compared to JoJo's Bizarre Adventure. In doing so, Tsuda was able to better preserve his vision for the project. When writing the script, Tsuda and Yasukawa had frequent brainstorming sessions followed by Tsuda providing Yasukawa with a rough outline which Yasukawa would later organize. The two of them would then come back together to discuss the script in several meetings together. Tsuda found it easy to work with Yasukawa because both had previously worked on JoJo's Bizarre Adventure. In addition to adapting the content from the "Hoshi no Hito" short story from the Planetarian light novel, Tsuda also wanted to include scenes from the light novel's "Snow Globe" and "Jerusalem" short stories, but he realized that it felt out of place once he started writing the script. However, Tsuda did include minor references to those stories in the film.

Although the film was planned to contain the content from the ONA series from the start with the addition of new material, Tsuda wanted to produce the ONA series and the film as separate entities. Tsuda was told at first to add about 10 to 15 minutes of new material to the content from the ONA series for the film, but Tsuda thought that would not be long enough to tell the story of Hoshi no Hito. After talking it over with the staff, he managed to get them to agree to include 40 minutes of new material interposed between the content from the ONA series, resulting in a running time of 117 minutes. The staff decided to organize the film to be a story about the junker, the protagonist, so the scenes from the ONA series are included with that in mind to better link the present events in the film with the past events from the ONA series.

The main art and filming staff who worked on Hoshi no Hito were intentionally kept separate from the staff that worked on the ONA series. Since the film is set about 50 years after the ONA series, Tsuda wanted to clearly depict just how much the world had fallen to ruin in that intervening time. However, the character designer for the ONA series, Hitomi Takechi, returned to provide the character design in the film once again based on Eeji Komatsu's original designs. Art board member Takayuki Nagashima aided in the depiction of recreating portions of Hamamatsu, which is used as a motif in the story, including the Matsubishi Department Store, although the planetarium on the rooftop is fictitious.

The music in the film is composed by Shinji Orito, Donmaru and Tomohiro Takeshita; Magome Togoshi is credited for his work on the music of the original visual novel. Sound and music direction was headed by Tsuda and Takayuki Yamaguchi. Tsuda decided on what kind of music to order from the composers while discussing it with Yamaguchi, and Tsuda started to think about how to use the music in specific scenes when he was drawing up the storyboard. Tsuda found it very helpful to have direct interaction with Orito who would come to him with various comments about the music. In contrast with the ONA series which uses music that emphasizes Yumemi's lovable nature, the music in the film is meant to evoke the junker's emotions. The film's theme song is "Hoshi no Fune" by Lia, and a single containing the song was released in September 2016. The Planetarian Original Soundtrack was released in October 2016.

The film premiered in Japan on September 3, 2016. It was released on Blu-ray in regular and special editions on February 24, 2017, in Japan. The film is licensed by Funimation in North America, who released it, along with the ONA series, on physical media on August 14, 2018. Funimation also produced an English dub for the film.
