= Love Song (Riya album) =

Studio album by Jun Maeda, Riya
- Released: August 31, 2005
- Genre: J-pop
- Length: 71:49
- Label: Key Sounds Label

Love Song is an album containing songs sung by Riya from Eufonius first released on August 31, 2005, in Japan by Key Sounds Label bearing the catalog number KSLA-0019. The album contains one disc with thirteen tracks composed and produced by Jun Maeda of Key. Additional participating musicians include Kendi Sato on electric guitar for tracks two and twelve, AchillesKEN on percussion for track seven, and Weisswurst on violin for tracks seven and thirteen. Cover art for the album was provided by Yoshitoshi Abe who also provided illustrations inside the album's booklet. Love Song is a concept album which tells the narrative of love as it heads toward ruin.

== Track listing ==
All tracks are written by Jun Maeda.

No.	Title	Length
1.	"Hajimari no Saka" (始まりの坂 The Hill Where Everything Began)	3:51
2.	"Ao no Yume" (蒼の夢 Blue Dream)	6:14
3.	"Hoshi Naru Ishi" (星なる石 The Stone That Became a Star)	6:30
4.	"Hashiru" (走る Run)	4:10
5.	"Hyakunen no Natsu" (百年の夏 The One Hundred Year Summer)	6:58
6.	"Bokura no Koi" (僕らの恋 Our Love)	7:04
7.	"Haiiro no Hane" (灰色の羽根 Gray Feather)	4:54
8.	"Gramophone" (グラモフォン Guramofon)	5:21
9.	"Shinwa" (神話 Myths)	5:34
10.	"Kōridokei" (氷時計 The Ice Clock)	3:58
11.	"Orenai Tsubasa" (折れない翼 Unbreakable Wings)	5:03
12.	"Soshite Monogatari ga Owaru" (そして物語が終わる Thus the Story Concluded)	7:40
13.	"Love Song"	4:32

== Legacy ==
The fifth track "Hyakunen no Natsu" (百年の夏, The One Hundred Year Summer) heavily sampled the background music track "Natsukage" (夏影, Summer Lights) from Key's 2000 visual novel Air, which was also written by Jun Maeda. The thirteenth track "Love Song" was later featured as a remixed background music version in Key's 2005 visual novel Tomoyo After: It's a Wonderful Life; this version later appeared on the Tomoyo After Original Soundtrack, along with a piano version. A different piano version of "Love Song" appeared on the Clannad and Tomoyo After remix album Piano no Mori. A remixed version of "Love Song" combined with the track "Memories" from the Tomoyo After Original Soundtrack appeared on the remix album Key 10th Memorial Fes Anniversary CD. Both "Love Song" and "Memories" are written by Jun Maeda. The fourth track "Hashiru" (走る, Run) was heavily sampled for Saya's leitmotif "Kakeru" (駆ける, Run) from Key's 2008 visual novel Little Busters! Ecstasy. The eleventh track "Orenai Tsubasa" (折れない翼, Unbreakable Wings) was sampled for "Eien" (永遠, Eternity), the ending theme song to Ram's 2008 visual novel 5; "Eien" was also written and composed by Jun Maeda. A cover of the seventh track "Haiiro no Hane" (灰色の羽根) sung by Vocaloid Hatsune Miku was included on Key+Vocaloid Best selection vol.1 released by Key Sounds Label in May 2012. The sixth track "Bokura no Koi" (僕らの恋, Our Love) was sampled for music tracks for The Day I Became a God original soundtrack.
