= Shikkoku no Sharnoth: What a Beautiful Tomorrow =

2008 video game

- Developer: Liar-soft
- Publisher: Liar-soft
- Designer: Hikaru Sakurai
- Artist: Akira
- Writer: Hikaru Sakurai
- Composers: Blueberry & Yogurt; M.U.T.S. Music Studio
- Platform: Microsoft Windows
- Release: November 21, 2008
- Genres: Eroge, visual novel
- Mode: Single-player

Shikkoku no Sharnoth: What a Beautiful Tomorrow (漆黒のシャルノス ~What a beautiful tomorrow~, Shikkoku no Sharunosu ~What a beautiful tomorrow~) is a Japanese adult visual novel developed by Liar-soft. It was released on November 21, 2008 for Microsoft Windows. Shikkoku no Sharnoth is Liar-soft's 24th game. The game is described as a "steampunk horror ADV" (スチームパンク ホラーADV, suchiimupanku horaa ADV). An English translation patch to the game was released on September 5, 2011.

The game includes references to the works of H.P. Lovecraft including mention of Kadath and having a character called 'Howard Phillips'.

== Gameplay ==
Shikkoku no Sharnoth's has two modes of gameplay. The first mode, like other visual novels, requires little interaction from the player as much of the player's time is spent reading the text that appears on the game's screen which represents the protagonist's thoughts or the dialogue between the different characters. The second mode occurs twice every chapter. In this mode, the player is presented with an isometric view of the protagonist and her surroundings and is tasked with guiding the protagonist to certain spots in the map while avoiding the monsters in the area in a turn-based system. This secondary gameplay feature is rather unique to Shikkoku no Sharnoth as the player's interaction with a visual novel is usually isolated to the graphics and audio.

== Plot ==
=== Setting ===
Shikkoku no Sharnoth is set in 1905 and takes place in London.

=== Characters ===
The player assumes the role of Mary Clarissa Christie (メアリ クラリッサ クリスティ, Meari Kurarissa Kurisuti; voiced by: Rino Kawashima), the protagonist of Shikkoku no Sharnoth. Mary has heterochromia eyes, her right eye is gold while her left eye is blue. She originally had blue eyes but her right eye changed colours one year prior to the game's events and she has been seeing strange visions since.

== Development ==
The planner and scenario writer of Shikkoku no Sharnoth is Hikari Sakurai. Sakurai has previously worked as a planner and scenario writer for Liar-soft on Sōten no Celenaria: What a beautiful world, Sekien no Inganock: What a beautiful people, and would follow Sharnoth with Hikaru no Valusia: What a beautiful hopes. the following year. The art and character designs of Shikkoku no Sharnoth were provided by AKIRA. The background music was composed by Blueberry & Yogurt and M.U.T.S. Music Studio.

While Liar-soft's other steampunk games had been set in fictional places, Sakurai decided to set Shikkoku no Sharnoth in London as she wanted to approach the game from a different angle. She also felt that London was a very important city in the steampunk genre.

=== Release history ===
On October 11, 2008, Liar-soft released a demo of Shikkoku no Sharnoth on the web. The game was then declared gold master on November 6, 2008 and released on November 21, 2008.

== Music ==
Shikkoku no Sharnoth has two theme songs, the main theme "Dorchadas" and the ending theme "Saudade". Both songs are sung by Rita.

== Reception ==
During the month of November 2008, Shikkoku no Sharnoth was the ninth most widely sold PC game on Getchu.com. In a countrywide ranking of bishōjo game sales in Japan of November 2008, Shikkoku no Sharnoth appeared in thirteenth place out of fifty.
