= Snow (2003 video game) =

2003 eroge visual novel

- Snow original visual novel cover featuring Ōka Wakō (left) and Sumino Yukizuki (right).

スノー (Sunō)
- Genre: Drama, Romance
- Video game
- Developer: Studio Mebius
- Publisher: VisualArt's (Windows); NEC Interchannel (DC, PS2); Prototype (PSP, FOMA)
- Genre: Eroge, Visual novel
- Platform: Windows, DC, PS2, FOMA, PSP, Android
- Released: JP: January 31, 2003 (Windows)
- Light novel
- Written by: Hangetsu Mitamura
- Illustrated by: Asuka Pyon
- Published by: Paradigm
- Original run: June 25, 2003 – January 16, 2004
- Volumes: 5
- Manga

Snow: Pure White
- Written by: Studio Mebius
- Illustrated by: Yuki Azuma
- Published by: Kadokawa Shoten
- Magazine: Comptiq
- Original run: September 2003 – December 2003
- Volumes: 1

Snow (スノー, Sunō) is a Japanese adult visual novel developed by Studio Mebius for Windows PCs on January 31, 2003. It was later ported without the erotic content to the Dreamcast, PlayStation 2, and PlayStation Portable consoles. The story of Snow revolves around the life of Kanata Izumo, who is revisiting a village to help his relative manage a hot spring inn. The gameplay in Snow follows a branching plot line which offers pre-determined scenarios with courses of interaction, and focuses on the appeal of the female main characters by the player character.

The game was successful in both sales and popularity, it was ranked as the best-selling PC game sold in Japan at the time of its release, and charted in the national top 50 several more times afterward. Snow was voted as the twenty-sixth best bishōjo game by the readers of Dengeki G's Magazine in 2007. A manga titled Snow: Pure White based on the visual novel was serialized in Comptiq between the September and December 2003 issues. Five light novels and several comic anthologies were also released, as were audio dramas. Studio Mebius went on to release a visual novel called Tomodachi Ijō Koibito Miman on September 24, 2004, which shares the same setting and characters from Snow but takes place years later and focuses on Meiko Tachibana.

== Gameplay ==
Average dialogue and narrative in Snow depicting the main character Kanata talking to Sumino.

Snow is a romance visual novel in which the player assumes the role of Kanata Izumo. Much of its gameplay is spent reading the text that appears on the screen, which represents the story's narrative and dialogue. The text is accompanied by character sprites, which represent who Kanata is talking to, over background art. Throughout the game, the player encounters CG artwork at certain points in the story, which take the place of the background art and character sprites.

In the original Windows release, the player must first complete Sumino and Asahi's story routes in order to unlock Shigure's route; after Shigure's route is completed, Ōka's route becomes available to play which serves as the true ending to Snow. Throughout gameplay, the player is given multiple options to choose from, and text progression pauses at these points until a choice is made. Some decisions can lead the game to end prematurely and offer an alternative ending to the plot. To view all plot lines in their entirety, the player will have to replay the game multiple times and choose different choices to further the plot to an alternate direction. In adult versions of the game, there are scenes depicting Kanata and a given heroine having sex.

== Plot ==
=== Story ===
The story of Snow starts when the main protagonist Kanata Izumo revisits a small village from his childhood called Ryūjin-mura (龍神村; lit. "Dragon God Village"). He is revisiting Ryūjin-mura to help manage a local inn with hot springs, Ryūjin Tenshukaku (龍神天守閣; lit. "Dragon God Keep"), alongside his cousin Tsugumi. In the village, there is an old legend: In ancient times, Ryūjin-mura was protected by the dragon goddess. However, one day the goddess fell in love with a human, which is strictly forbidden, and this incident caused the village to be always covered by snow after that. The game then tells the daily life of Kanata interacting with the village girls and ultimately links the story to the legend. Snow follows a branching plot line with multiple endings, and depending on the decisions that the player makes during the game, the plot will progress in a specific direction.

=== Main characters ===
The player assumes the role of Kanata Izumo (出雲 彼方, Izumo Kanata), who is visiting Ryūjin-mura as a part-time worker of the local inn owned by his cousin. During his stay, he meets his childhood friend and the main heroine of the game Sumino Yukizuki (雪月 澄乃, Yukizuki Sumino; voiced by Nirai Kanai), a soothing and gentle girl whose father has died. She loves anman (a kind of mantou) and claims that it's a source of life. Kanata also encounters a young energetic girl with a tomboy personality called Asahi Hiyorigawa (日和川 旭, Hiyorigawa Asahi; voiced by Rita), suddenly appearing before Kanata and claiming that she will repulse the evil from him.

In the outskirts of the village, Kanata meets the mysterious Shigure Kitazato (北里 しぐれ, Kitazato Shigure; voiced by Hikaru Isshiki); Shigure has a shy personality and is extremely silent. The protagonist also finds a little girl called Ōka Wakō (若生 桜花, Wakō Ōka; voiced by Kanae Tsumugi) waiting around the jinja for her parents. She likes to play with her cat called Shamon (シャモン). The physician of Ryujin-mura has a daughter called Meiko Tachibana (橘 芽依子, Tachibana Meiko; voiced by Chisato Suzumori), who is a close friend of Sumino. She likes to tease Kanata, and acts bizarrely in front of him. In Snow: Plus Edition, a new character referred to as Mysterious Girl (謎の少女, Nazo no Shōjo; voiced by Tomoe Tamiyasu) is introduced, bearing many secrets.

== Development and release ==
Snow was planned to be released at the beginning of 2001, but the release date would end up being postponed several times until it was released two years later in 2003. The artists for Snow were Asuka Pyon, who was in charge of character design, and Kobuichi. The game's scenario was written by three members of staff: Mochizuki Jet, Klein, and Jinno Masaki. Kazuya Takase from I've Sound composed the songs in Snow, while Famishin composed the background music (BGM). According to the liner notes on the original soundtrack of Snow, the producers acknowledged that the game's structure resembled Key's visual novels Kanon and Air. Yūichi Suzumoto, who is known for his work on various Key games, worked as an assistant writer for Snow. The setting of the game, Ryūjin-mura, was modeled after the real village Ryūjin in Wakayama Prefecture.

On January 31, 2003, Snow was released as both a CD-ROM and DVD-ROM compatible to the Windows 98/ME/2000/XP operating systems. An all-ages version for the Dreamcast was released by Interchannel on September 25, 2003. Later on February 26, 2004, Interchannel ported the game to the PlayStation 2 in both limited and regular editions; the PS2 port adds an additional scenario for Meiko Tachibana who was a supporting character in prior releases of Snow. A fully voiced version was released for Windows on September 24, 2004. Then on September 29, 2006, Snow: Plus Edition was released for Windows, sporting added parts from the console versions and introducing a new heroine. A version of the game for NTT DoCoMo FOMA cell phones was released by Prototype on VisualArt's Motto on October 27, 2006. A PlayStation Portable version of the game called Snow: Portable was released by Prototype on August 16, 2007. The standard edition for Windows was released on July 25, 2008, including a dark version of the game called Ankoku Snow which was originally released with the Studio Mebius fan disc Mebinya! Mebius Fandisc, and the content from the portable edition of Snow. A downloadable version of the PSP edition was made available on the PlayStation Store by Prototype on January 21, 2010. Snow became playable on Android on November 17, 2015.

== Related media ==
=== Books and publications ===
Five adult light novels written by Hangetsu Mitamura and published by Paradigm were released between June 2003 and January 2004. The cover art and internal illustrations were drawn by Asuka Pyon, the artist who drew the artwork in the visual novel. The first novel, titled Snow: Hakana Yuki (Snow ～儚雪～; Sumino), was released on June 25, 2003. The second novel was released on July 25, 2003, titled Snow: Chīsaki Inori (Snow ～小さき祈り～; Asahi). The third novel, titled Snow: Inishie no Yūyake (Snow ～古の夕焼け～), was released on September 20, 2003, focusing on Ryūjin-mura's legend. The fourth novel, titled Snow: Kioku no Toge (Snow ～記憶の棘～; Shigure), was released on November 22, 2003. The fifth and final novel, titled Snow: Sora no Yurikago (Snow ～空の揺りかご～; Ōka), was released on January 16, 2004. A 192-page art book, titled Snow Art Works, and containing information such as story and character explanations and images from the visual novel was released by Paradigm on July 25, 2003.

=== Manga ===
A game-based manga adaptation titled Snow: Pure White and illustrated by Yuki Azuma was serialized between the September and December 2003 issues of Comptiq. The manga was later compiled into a single bound volume and released by Kadokawa Shoten on December 19, 2003. The manga consists of four chapters, each being a short story focused on a different Snow heroine.

Ohzora released Snow's first comic anthology, a stand-alone volume titled Snow Anthology Game Comics, on March 22, 2003. The second comic anthology titled Snow Comic Anthology spanned two volumes; the first was released by Ichijinsha on April 25 and the second on June 25, 2003. A third comic anthology titled Snow Game Comic was released by the now-defunct publisher Raporto in two volumes on April 25 and May 24, 2003. On May 26, 2003, Enterbrain released the last stand-alone anthology titled Snow Anthology Comic.

=== Music and audio CDs ===
"Snow"
A 30-second sample of "Snow", in which Yumi Matsuzawa sings the first verse.

The opening theme for Snow is "Snow" sung by Yumi Matsuzawa, who also provided vocals for the ending themes "Futari no Ashiato" (ふたりの足跡) and "Yuki no Kanata" (雪のかなた), and the insert song "Sora no Yurikago" (空の揺りかご). Before the visual novel's release, an album containing the BGM of Snow, titled Snow Image Album, was released at Comiket 63 on December 28, 2002. The original soundtrack for Snow was released on April 25, 2003, containing 29 tracks. A single titled Snow Extra CD was released at Comiket 64 on August 15, 2003, containing "Sora no Yurikago".

Three drama CDs based on Snow have been released. The first CD volume was released by Movic on August 22, 2003, focusing on Sumino Yukizuki. Movic released a second volume focusing on Asahi Hiyorigawa, on October 24, 2003. The third and final volume, telling the story of Ryūjin-mura's legend, was released by Frontier Works on August 25, 2004.

=== Merchandise ===
The merchandising company Exhaust has sold shitajiki (pencil boards), transparent posters and postcards, dakimakura (hug pillows), a collection of character portraits, a telephone card set featuring Sumino and Ōka, and a stuffed toy of Ōka's pet cat Shamon. G-Toys released a capsule pin collection with the Snow heroines drawn in the chibi style. 1:8 scale PVC figures of Sumino, Asahi, Shigure, and Ōka were sold by the toy manufacturer Kotobukiya. Six gashapon (capsule toy) figures of the Snow heroines have been produced as a part of the risqué Digital Girls Paradise collection.

== Reception ==
In a national sales ranking of bishōjo games conducted by PCNews, the DVD-ROM of Snow premiered at number one in the rankings, while the CD-ROM version ranked closely behind at number three. During the beginning of February, the CD-ROM ranked at number eight, while the DVD-ROM ranked just above at number seven. The DVD-ROM made another appearance in the ranking at 31 during mid-February and the CD-ROM had low enough sales to not chart. Finally, both the CD-ROM and DVD-ROM versions made their final appearances on the charts at 33 and 46 at the beginning of March, respectively.

The game is now regarded as a classic in the nakige visual novel genre, though some gamers were confused about Studio Mebius' change of direction with Snow since they were a brand known for producing dark and graphic eroge. Snow was the second most widely sold game of 2003 on Getchu.com, a major redistributor of visual novel and domestic anime products. According to sales information taken from the Japanese Amazon website, Snow sold 64,526 copies in 2003. As of February 4, 2013, the PS2 version of Snow sold over 24,385 copies. In the October 2007 issue of Dengeki G's Magazine, poll results for the 50 best bishōjo games were released. Snow ranked No. 26 out of 249 titles, with 11 votes. Snow is featured in the Lycèe Trading Card Game.
