= Key 10th Memorial Fes Anniversary CD =

Remix album by Jun Maeda, Shinji Orito, and Magome Togoshi
- Released: February 28, 2009
- Length: 80:04
- Label: Key Sounds Label

Key 10th Memorial Fes Anniversary CD is remix album released on February 28, 2009 in Japan by Key Sounds Label bearing the catalog numbers KSLC-0004—0005. It was released at Key 10th Memorial Fes, an event hosted by the visual novel development brand Key under VisualArt's and held during February 28 and March 1, 2009 to commemorate the tenth anniversary of the game brand's establishment. The album contains two discs with sixteen tracks, though only the music on the first disc is of new remixes of music from Key's visual novels. The second disc re-uses older remixes previously released by Key Sounds Label on the albums Recollections and Ornithopter; tracks one through six are from the former, and the remaining tracks are from the latter. The tracks on the album were composed, arranged, and produced by Jun Maeda, Shinji Orito, Magome Togoshi, Takumaru, Manack, Manyo, and PMMK.

== Track listing ==
Disc 1
No.	Title	Music	Arrangement	Length
1.	"Yakusoku ～ Fuyu no Hanabi" (約束～冬の花火 Promise ～ Winter Fireworks; from Kanon)	Shinji Orito, Jun Maeda	Takumaru	5:46
2.	"Kaisōroku ～ Natsukage" (回想録～夏影 Reminiscence ～ Summer Lights; from Air)	Magome Togoshi, Jun Maeda	Manack	6:16
3.	"Negai ga Kanau Basho" (願いが叶う場所 The Place Where Wishes Come True) (Performed by Aya Sōma; from Clannad)	Jun Maeda	Manyo	5:53
4.	"Love Song ～ Memories" (Performed by Annabel, Kaori Furukawa, Takashi Kamijō, Kazue, Marie (all chorus only); from Tomoyo After)	Jun Maeda	Manyo	6:26
5.	"Gentle Jena" (from Planetarian)	Magome Togoshi, Shinji Orito (recorder)	PMMK	4:29

Disc 2
No.	Title	Music	Arrangement	Length
1.	"Pure Snows"	Shinji Orito	Magome Togoshi	4:22
2.	"Asakage" (朝影 Morning Lights)	Shinji Orito	Magome Togoshi	5:26
3.	"Hidamari no Machi" (日溜りの街 A Sunny City)	Shinji Orito	Magome Togoshi	5:47
4.	"Fuyu no Hanabi" (冬の花火 Winter Fireworks)	Jun Maeda	Shinji Orito	3:41
5.	"Little fragments"	Shinji Orito	Magome Togoshi	4:22
6.	"Umaretate no Kaze" (生まれたての風 A Newborn Wind)	Shinji Orito	Magome Togoshi	4:39
7.	"Natsukage" (夏影 Summer Lights)	Jun Maeda	OdiakeS	3:17
8.	"Tentōmushi" (てんとう虫 Ladybug)	Magome Togoshi	Kazuya Takase (I've Sound)	5:21
9.	"Hanemizu" (跳ね水 Splashing Water)	Shinji Orito	Magome Togoshi	4:45
10.	"Sōsei" (双星 Twin Stars)	Magome Togoshi	Wakana	5:20
11.	"Yasō" (夜想 Nocturne)	Magome Togoshi	Shinji Orito	4:14
Total length:				80:04
