= Birthday Song, Requiem =

Single by Jun Maeda and Lia
- Released: December 28, 2002
- Genre: Single
- Length: 17:28
- Label: Key Sounds Label
- Songwriter: Jun Maeda

"Birthday Song, Requiem" is a collaboration maxi single containing songs sung by former I've Sound singer Lia. It was first released on December 28, 2002 at Comiket 63 in Japan by Key Sounds Label bearing the catalog number KSLA-0007. The single contains one disc with three tracks composed, arranged, and produced by Jun Maeda, Magome Togoshi, Ryō Okabe, and Fishtone. The cover art features a passage from Mark 16:6-7 from the American Standard Version of the Bible.

== Track listing ==
All tracks are written by Jun Maeda.

No.	Title	Arrangement	Length
1.	"Birthday Song, Requiem"	Magome Togoshi	4:58
2.	"Koigokoro" (恋心 One's Love)	Ryō Okabe	6:36
3.	"Birthday Song, Requiem (fishtone remix)"	Fishtone	5:54
