= Music of Harmonia =

Harmonia discography
- Soundtrack albums: 1
- Singles: 1
- Remixes: 1

Harmonia is a visual novel developed by Key and published by VisualArt's in 2016. The story is set in a world where artificially intelligent, emotional androids called Phiroids were developed before a rapid decline in human civilization. An emotionless young man named Rei with a mechanical right hand is cared for by a girl in a small town as he gradually learns how to express emotions. The discography of Harmonia consists of one single, one soundtrack and one remix album. The core of the discography is the original soundtrack album produced by Key Sounds Label in 2017. The music on the soundtrack was composed and arranged by Shinji Orito, Ryō Mizutsuki, Tomohiro Takeshita, Yūichirō Tsukagoshi and Meeon.

== Albums ==
=== Harmonia Original Soundtrack ===
The Harmonia Original Soundtrack, from the visual novel Harmonia, was bundled with the game when it was released for general sale on May 26, 2017 in Japan. The album is produced by Key Sounds Label bearing the catalog number KSLA-0134. The album contains one disc with 17 music tracks composed, arranged and produced by Shinji Orito, Ryō Mizutsuki, Tomohiro Takeshita, Yūichirō Tsukagoshi and Meeon. Ayaka Kitazawa sings "Todoketai Melody Short Ver" and Haruka Shimotsuki sings "Towa no Hoshi e".

Track listing
No.	Title	Music	Arrangement	Length
1.	"Terrarum"	Ryō Mizutsuki	Ryō Mizutsuki	4:30
2.	"Oppidum"	Shinji Orito	Shinji Orito	3:08
3.	"Vitae"	Shinji Orito	Shinji Orito	3:11
4.	"Cantus"	Ryō Mizutsuki	Ryō Mizutsuki	1:47
5.	"Library"	Shinji Orito	Shinji Orito	3:01
6.	"Tristitia"	Shinji Orito	Shinji Orito	5:05
7.	"Risu"	Ryō Mizutsuki	Ryō Mizutsuki	3:21
8.	"Rruinis"	Shinji Orito	Shinji Orito	4:40
9.	"Pecado"	Shinji Orito	Shinji Orito	4:44
10.	"Scindet"	Ryō Mizutsuki	Ryō Mizutsuki	3:46
11.	"Reditum"	Ryō Mizutsuki	Ryō Mizutsuki	3:38
12.	"Caveam"	Ryō Mizutsuki	Ryō Mizutsuki	2:06
13.	"Harmonia"	Ryō Mizutsuki	Ryō Mizutsuki	3:00
14.	"Spero"	Shinji Orito	Shinji Orito	2:21
15.	"Halitus"	Tomohiro Takeshita	Tomohiro Takeshita	2:15
16.	"Todoketai Melody Short Ver" (届けたいメロディ) (Performed by Ayaka Kitazawa)	Shinji Orito	Yūichirō Tsukagoshi	2:24
17.	"Towa no Hoshi e" (永遠の星へ) (Performed by Haruka Shimotsuki)	Tomohiro Takeshita	Meeon	5:51
Total length:				58:48

=== Teneritas ===
Teneritas is a remix album with music tracks taken from the Harmonia visual novel and arranged into piano versions. It was bundled with the game when it was released for general sale on May 26, 2017 in Japan. The album is produced by Key Sounds Label bearing the catalog number KSLA-0135. The album contains one disc with 11 tracks. The album is composed and produced by Shinji Orito, Ryō Mizutsuki and Tomohiro Takeshita; tracks are arranged by Mizutsuki.

Track listing
No.	Title	Music	Length
1.	"Kotoba (Todoketai Melody yori)" (コトバ (届けたいメロディより))	Shinji Orito	4:46
2.	"Sekai (Terrarum yori)" (セカイ (Terrarumより))	Ryō Mizutsuki	4:13
3.	"Itonami (Vitae yori)" (イトナミ (Vitaeより))	Shinji Orito	3:56
4.	"Utaumono (Cantus yori)" (ウタウモノ (Cantusより))	Ryō Mizutsuki	3:48
5.	"Ikoi (Oppidum yori)" (イコイ (Oppidumより))	Shinji Orito	3:22
6.	"Kiroku (Library yori)" (キロク (Libraryより))	Shinji Orito	2:28
7.	"Tsumeato (Rruinis yori)" (ツメアト (Rruinisより))	Shinji Orito	5:24
8.	"Tsumi (Pecado yori)" (ツミ (Pecadoより))	Shinji Orito	4:28
9.	"Kanashimi (Tristitia yori)" (カナシミ (Tristitiaより))	Shinji Orito	4:17
10.	"Ayumi (Harmonia yori)" (アユミ (Harmoniaより))	Ryō Mizutsuki	2:43
11.	"Towa (Towa no Hoshi e yori)" (トワ (永遠の星へより))	Tomohiro Takeshita	6:07
Total length:			45:32

== Todoketai Melody / Towa no Hoshi e ==
"Todoketai Melody / Towa no Hoshi e" (届けたいメロディ/永遠の星へ) is a single from the visual novel Harmonia containing the game's theme songs sung by Ayaka Kitazawa and Haruka Shimotsuki. It was released on April 11, 2015 by Key Sounds Label bearing the catalog number KSLA-0100. The single contains four tracks including the original and instrumental versions of "Todoketai Melody" and "Towa no Hoshi e". The single is composed, arranged and produced by Shinji Orito, Tomohiro Takeshita, Yūichirō Tsukagoshi and Meeon.

All lyrics are written by Kai.

Track listing
No.	Title	Music	Arrangement	Length
1.	"Todoketai Melody" (届けたいメロディ) (Performed by Ayaka Kitazawa)	Shinji Orito	Yūichirō Tsukagoshi	5:13
2.	"Towa no Hoshi e" (永遠の星へ) (Performed by Haruka Shimotsuki)	Tomohiro Takeshita	Meeon	5:52
3.	"Todoketai Melody (off vocal Ver.)" (届けたいメロディ)	Shinji Orito	Yūichirō Tsukagoshi	5:14
4.	"Towa no Hoshi e (off vocal Ver.)" (永遠の星へ)	Tomohiro Takeshita	Meeon	5:52
Total length:				22:11
