= Spica/Hanabi/Moon =

Single by Jun Maeda and Lia
- Released: August 15, 2003
- Genre: Single
- Length: 23:16
- Label: Key Sounds Label

"Spica/Hanabi/Moon" is a collaboration maxi single containing songs sung by I've Sound's Lia first released on August 15, 2003, at Comiket 64 in Japan by Key Sounds Label bearing the catalog number KSLA-0008. The single contains one disc with three tracks composed, arranged, and produced by Jun Maeda, Sorma, Yū Hagiwara, and Takumaru. "Hanabi" was later used as the ending theme for episode six of the 2013 anime series Little Busters! Refrain.

== Track listing ==
All tracks are written by Jun Maeda

No.	Title	Arrangement	Length
1.	"Spica"	Sorma	5:07
2.	"Hanabi"	Yū Hagiwara	5:07
3.	"Moon"	Takumaru	5:52
4.	"Spica (Sorma remix)"	Sorma	5:41
