= Rita (Japanese singer) =

Japanese singer, lyricist, and voice actress

- 理多
- Born: March 25; Suita, Osaka, Japan
- Occupations: Singer, lyricist, voice actress
- Years active: 2002–present
- Musical career
- Genres: Video Game Music
- Instrument: Vocals
- Label: Lantis
- Website: rita-official.info

Rita (理多; born March 25), real name Riko Hirai (平井 理子), is a Japanese singer, lyricist, and voice actress from Osaka. The majority of her work is dealt with adult visual novels. She was also the singer for all the vocal music in Key's visual novel Little Busters!, as well as Liar-soft's "Steampunk" series.

== Discography ==
- Mjuka (December 28, 2011)
- meaning (August 13, 2010—78 pre-sale copies)
- mighty (November 11, 2009)
- magnetism (January 21, 2009)
- motion (December 7, 2007)
- Little Busters Original Soundtrack (September 28, 2007)
- multiple (May 30, 2007)
- mignon (～みにょん～) (December 29, 2006)
- moment (～もぉめんと～) (April 6, 2005)
- memoire (～めもわぁる～) (April 6, 2005)
- monologue (～ものろぉぐ～) (August 15, 2003)
- Rita's Hour04
- doll ~Utahime~ vol. 3 Suzu (doll～歌姫～vol.3 涼)
- GWAVE 2013 2nd Progress
- GWAVE SuperFeature's vol.3 "Mermaid Kiss"

== Voice roles ==
- Little Busters! and Kud Wafter as A-chan
- Cross Channel as Nanaka
- Kindred Spirits on the Roof as Koba Youka
- SNOW as Asahi
- Yume Miru Kusuri: A Drug That Makes You Dream as Misaki
