= Ceui =

Japanese singer–songwriter (born January 31)

- Born: January 31
- Origin: Chiba, Japan
- Genres: J-pop
- Occupation: Singer–songwriter
- Instruments: Vocals, piano
- Years active: 2000–present
- Label: Lantis
- Website: ceuiceui.com

Ceui (/ˈseɪ/, born January 31) is a Japanese singer–songwriter originally from Chiba, Japan, though she grew up in Fukuoka. Ceui's name is derived from the Portuguese word for sky, céu. She has been singing since 2000, but made her major debut in 2007 singing the ending theme for the anime series Shattered Angels, and since then has done songs for other anime including Sola, Sora o Miageru Shōjo no Hitomi ni Utsuru Sekai, Sora Kake Girl, and Aoi Hana. She has released eleven singles and released her major debut album Glassy Heaven on July 22, 2009.

== Biography ==
Ceui was born in Chiba, Japan, though she grew up in Fukuoka. Due to the influence of her mother as a piano teacher, Ceui began learning classical piano at the age of six. As a young girl, she became interested in children's literature and poetry, and began writing verses herself. As a student, she was a member of the wind instrument club and choir. She went to Shirayuri Women's University where she graduated with a degree in Japanese literature.

In 2000, Ceui made a demo tape and was able to produce two six-track albums for the Japanese home furnishing store Francfranc entitled Spring Time and Autumn Mind; the albums were released via Filter Ink. Officially, these albums were released as "Francfranc's Bedside Music Selection featuring Ceui". In 2002, Ceui worked on a project CD with the Japanese apparel company Sanei-International for their clothing brand LUVLISH 'cos brilliant. In 2003, Ceui went on an overseas live tour with other artists sponsored by Filter Ink. On October 21, 2004, Ceui released an independent album titled Ashimoto ni Furu Ame: Raindrops falling on My Feet, which was sold in HMV stores nationwide in Japan. The same day, a project CD Ceui had worked on for the Japanese fortune teller Kaoruko Stella entitled Love Chance Music also went on sale. In 2006, Ceui provided a chorus to the blind Japanese pianist Kohshi Kishita.

Ceui made her major debut on Lantis' MellowHead music label brand with the release of her first single "Madoromi no Rakuen" in February 2007. Ceui would release one more single in 2007, "Mellow Melody", followed by another in 2008, "Kamigami no Uta". Ceui released five more singles in 2009, as well as her debut album Glassy Heaven in July 2009. Her ninth single "Truth Of My Destiny" was released in 2010.

In 2013, singer Annabel and Ceui collaborated on the split single "Phantasmagoria / Shall We Dance" for the original video animation series Hanayaka Nari, Waga Ichizoku: Kinetograph.

== Discography ==
=== Singles ===
1. "Madoromi no Rakuen" (微睡みの楽園), released February 21, 2007
2. "Mellow Melody", released May 23, 2007
3. "Kamigami no Uta" (神々の詩), released November 26, 2008
4. "Hikari to Yami to Toki no Hate" (光と闇と時の果て), released February 25, 2009
5. "Espacio", released May 13, 2009
6. "Seisen Spectale" (聖戦スペクタル), released May 27, 2009
7. "Centifolia" (センテフォリア), released August 5, 2009
8. "Prism" (プリズム), released August 26, 2009
9. "Truth Of My Destiny", released August 11, 2010
10. "Last Inferno", released October 27, 2010
11. "Stardust Melodia", released November 9, 2011
12. "Kaze no Naka no Primrose" (風のなかのプリムローズ), released August 8, 2012
13. "Souai Calendula" (奏愛カレンデュラ), released July 24, 2013
14. "Pandora", released November 5, 2014

=== Independent albums ===
1. Autumn Mind, released 2000
2. Spring Time, released 2000
3. Ashimoto ni Furu Ame (Raindrops falling on My Feet) (足もとに降る雨～Raindrops falling on My Feet～), released October 21, 2004
4. First Eden, released May 3, 2011
5. Pandora Code: Kibō-hen (パンドラ・コード 〜希望篇〜) / Pandora Code: Zetsubō-hen (パンドラ・コード 〜絶望篇〜) , released September 10, 2014
6. Pastel Eden, released May 20, 2015
7. Sympathia, released Aug. 10, 2018

=== Studio albums ===
1. Glassy Heaven, released July 22, 2009
2. Labyrintus, released June 12, 2012
3. Rapsodia, released December 26, 2012
4. Gabriel Code: Eden e Michibiku Hikari no Gakufu, released November 20, 2013

=== Compilations ===
1. Crystal3: Circus Vocal Collection Vol.3, released December 21, 2006
2. Oratorio, released August 8, 2007
3. @Lantis NonStop Dance Remix Vol.1, released April 23, 2008
4. Songs from Eternal Fantasy, released February 27, 2008
5. Brilliant World, released January 7, 2009
6. Sora o Miageru Shōjo no Hitomi ni Utsuru Sekai Inspired Album, released March 25, 2009
7. Koi to Senkyo to Chocolate Songs, released April 27, 2011
8. Asphodelus, released April 28, 2011
9. Shin'ai naru Sekai e, released April 28, 2011
10. Heart of Magic Garden, released June 27, 2012
11. Iro to Ridori no Hikari Theme Songs Plus, released August 15, 2012
12. Straight Sheep / Yume Kai Biyori, released August 24, 2012
13. Musōkyoku 〜Seeking Asphodelus〜, released October 24, 2012
14. Phantasmagoria / Sharui Dance, released January 23, 2013
15. Ashita e Shiori / Dear Smile, released January 25, 2013
16. Imasugu Oniichan ni Imoto datteiitai! Vocal Album, released March 27, 2013
17. Ao no kanata no Forizumu Vocal Album, released May 1, 2016
18. Twinkle Starlight / Worlds Pain, released July 27, 2016
19. Phyllis no Atelier: Fushigi na Tabi no Renkinjutsu-shi Vocal Album, released November 2, 2016

=== Best album ===
1. 10th Anniversary Album - Anime - 'Akashic Record: Ruby', released June 21, 2017
2. 10th Anniversary Album - Game - 'Akashic Record: Sapphire', released August 25, 2017
