= Naomi Wakabayashi =

Japanese actress and voice actress (born 1975)

- 若林 直美
- Born: November 2, 1975 (age 50); Kōfu, Tottori, Japan
- Other names: Miyako Suzuta (鈴田 美夜子, Suzuta Miyako)
- Occupations: Actress; voice actress
- Years active: 1998–present
- Agent: Forest Link
- Children: 1

Naomi Wakabayashi (若林 直美, Wakabayashi Naomi; born November 2, 1975 in Kōfu, Tottori) is a Japanese actress and voice actress. She's credited under the name Miyako Suzuta (鈴田 美夜子, Suzuta Miyako) in products with adult content. She has been married since her 33rd birthday, and gave birth to her first child on February 14, 2015.

== Filmography ==
=== Anime ===
- Aokana: Four Rhythm Across the Blue – Madoka Aoyagi
- Blood+ – Dismas
- Boogiepop Phantom – Rika
- Fighting Fantasy Girl Rescue Me: Mave-chan (OAV) – Banshee-chan
- Fighting Spirit – Yuuji Date
- Fullmetal Alchemist – Sheska
- Fullmetal Alchemist the Movie: Conqueror of Shamballa – Sheska
- Gad Guard as Mimi
- The Idolmaster series (except for Idolmaster: Xenoglossia) – Ritsuko Akizuki
- Inuyasha – Kosuke
- Kaginado – Kudryavka Noumi
- Little Busters! – Kudryavka Noumi
- Vandread – Celtic Midori
- Vandread Turbulence (OAV) – Celtic Midori
- Vandread: The Second Stage – Celtic Midori

=== Video games ===
- Puyo Puyo series – Dongurigaeru, Ocean Prince
- Identity V - Doctor/Emily Dyer
- The Idolmaster series – Ritsuko Akizuki
- The Legend of Zelda: Twilight Princess – Additional voices
- Chu→ning Lover – Erukueru Alfred
- Fate/Grand Order - Britomart
