= Keiko Suzuki =

Japanese voice actress and narrator

Keiko Suzuki (すずき けいこ, Suzuki Keiko; born August 31) is a Japanese voice actress and narrator from Osaka. She voices characters from visual novels, and has been in the cast of five Key titles. She is also known under the name Chisato Suzumori (涼森ちさと, Suzumori Chisato).

== Filmography ==
=== Anime ===
- Clannad (2007) as Girl
- Little Busters! (2012) as Haruka Saigusa, Kanata Futaki
- Rewrite (2016–2017) as Shizuru Nakatsu
- Planetarian: The Reverie of a Little Planet (2016) as Yumemi Hoshino
- Nora, Princess, and Stray Cat (2017) as Narrator
- Kud Wafter (2021) as Haruka Saigusa, Kanata Futaki
- Kaginado (2021–2022) as Haruka Saigusa, Shizuru Nakatsu, Yumemi Hoshino

=== Video games ===
- Snow (2003) as Meiko Tachibana
- Shinkyoku Sōkai Polyphonica (2006) as Eufinley Tsuge
- Iinazuke (2007) as Stinrorra Grana Mishal
- Tomoyo After: It's a Wonderful Life CS Edition (2007) as Takafumi Sakagami, Kanako
- Little Busters! (2007) as Haruka Saigusa
- Little Busters! Ecstasy (2008) as Haruka Saigusa, Kanata Futaki
- Flyable Heart (2009) as Shirasagi Mayuri
- Kud Wafter (2010) as Kanata Futaki
- Rewrite (2011) as Shizuru Nakatsu
