= Magome Togoshi =

- Origin: Japan
- Genres: J-pop, Techno
- Occupation: Composer
- Instruments: Electronic drum module, Keyboard, Synthesizer
- Years active: 1999–present
- Label: Key Sounds Label

Magome Togoshi (戸越まごめ, Togoshi Magome) is a Japanese video game composer for visual novel studios. He began work as a music arranger in 1999, where he started working for the visual novel studio Key under VisualArt's to produce music for Kanon. Between then and 2006, Togoshi composed music for four more titles by Key, along with other games produced by game brands also under VisualArt's. In October 2006, Togoshi resigned from Key and VisualArt's. He continues working with other visual novel developers.

== Career ==
Magome Togoshi began working as a music arranger for music in visual novels starting with Key's first title Kanon in 1999. He was first credited with the arrangement on the remix album Anemoscope released in June 1999. Following this, Togoshi composed music for Key's second game Air in 2000. Following the success of Air and the game's soundtrack, Togoshi became a well-known composer to visual novel enthusiasts. Production for Key's next game Clannad began in 2001 and while the game was still in production, Togoshi composed music for other brands under VisualArt's, which Key is attached under. These include the now-defunct Words brand with their game Sakura no Ki Shita de released in 2002, and Bonbee!'s Alma: Zutto Soba ni... released in 2003.

In 2004 when Clannad was finally released, Togoshi also composed music for two games by Giant Panda—Oshikake Princess, and Maiden Halo. That same year, Togoshi composed nearly the entire soundtrack for Key's fourth game Planetarian: The Reverie of a Little Planet. The following year in 2005, Togoshi composed music for Tomoyo After: It's a Wonderful Life, Key's fifth title. In 2006, he once again helped Giant Panda with the music for their game Futari de Hitotsu no Koigokoro, along with Key's sixth title Little Busters!. Music that Togoshi either arranged or composed for Key titles was published on Key's record label Key Sounds Label. In October 2006 with Little Busters! still in the production, Togoshi resigned from Key and VisualArt's. Following this, Togoshi worked on the music for ALcot's visual novel FairChild released in 2007. The ending theme for the 2008 visual novel 5 by Ram was arranged by Togoshi.
