= List of Rewrite episodes =

Release
- Original release: July 2, 2016 – March 25, 2017

The Rewrite anime television series is based on the visual novel of the same name by the Japanese visual novel brand Key. The episodes are produced by the animation studio Eight Bit and are directed by Tensho. The screenplay is written by Takashi Aoshima and Tatsuya Takahashi with Romeo Tanaka and Kai credited with collaborating on the composition and scripts. The series features character design by Masayuki Nonaka who based the designs on Itaru Hinoue's original concepts. The story follows the life of Kotarou Tennouji, a high school student with superhuman abilities who investigates supernatural mysteries with five girls from his school in the fictional city of Kazamatsuri. This ultimately leads him into the middle of a conflict between familiar summoners and superhumans with the fate of the world at stake.

The first 13 episodes of the 24-episode series aired between July 2 and September 24, 2016, on the BS-11, Gunma TV, Tochigi TV and Tokyo MX television networks in Japan. It aired at later dates on MBS and AT-X. The latter 11 episodes aired from January 14 to March 25, 2017, which adapts the Moon and Terra routes from the visual novel. The series was also streamed by Crunchyroll with English subtitles. The series was released on 13 DVD and Blu-ray compilation volumes between September 28, 2016, and September 27, 2017, by Aniplex.

The anime series makes use of seven main pieces of theme music: four opening themes and three ending themes. The first opening theme is "Philosophyz (TV animation ver.)" and the first ending theme is "Sasayaka na Hajimari (TV animation ver.)" (ささやかなはじまり 〜TV animation ver.〜), both sung by Runa Mizutani of NanosizeMir. Both songs are remixes of theme songs featured in the original Rewrite visual novel and its fan disc Rewrite Harvest festa!. The second opening theme is "End of the World" by Anri Kumaki and the second ending theme is "Word of Dawn" by Aoi Tada. The third opening theme is "Tabi" (旅), an instrumental piece composed by Jun Maeda. The fourth opening theme is "Last Desire" sung by Maon Kurosaki and the third ending theme is "Instincts" by Mizutani.

Eight additional ending themes include "Koibumi" (恋文) by Nagi Yanagi used in episode four, "Sunbright" (サンブライト) by Ayaka Kitazawa used in episode five, "Itsuwaranai Kimi e" (偽らない君へ) by Yanagi used in episode 10, "Yami no Kanata e" (闇の彼方へ) by Mizutani used in episode 13, "Daisy Memory" composed by Maiko Iuchi used in episode 14, "A Seed Leaf" composed by Iuchi used in episode 15, "Watari no Uta" (渡りの詩) sung by Tada used in episode 16, and "Canoe" sung by Tada used in episode 24. Three songs are also used as insert songs: "Innocence Eye" sung by Mizutani in episode 15, "Rewrite" by Psychic Lover in episode 16, and "Philosophyz" sung by Mizutani in episode 24. The rest of the soundtrack for the anime series is sampled from the Rewrite Original Soundtrack and Feast.

== Episode list ==
No.	Title	Original release date
1	"The World or Myself?"; Transliteration: "Sekai ka, Jibun ka" (Japanese: 世界か、自分か)	July 2, 2016
High school student Kotarou Tennouji dreams of a girl with red ribbons stabbing him in the heart, only for the girl to start visiting him nightly when he is asleep. Kotarou's friend Kotori Kanbe suggests he seeks help from the "School Witch" and president of the occult research society, but they find the club room empty, so Kotarou leaves a note to get in touch with her. Returning to the club room later, Kotarou finds a questionnaire which he fills out. He later gets a text from the witch telling him to go to school at midnight, but he encounters the girl with the red ribbons and runs away from her, inadvertently stepping into a different dimension. There, he meets two small plant-like creatures named Pani and Gil. They attempt to lead him to a way out, but awaken a gigantic monster in the process which attacks them. However, the girl with the red ribbons appears and fights the monster, resulting in the dimension breaking down and Kotarou falling through a large chasm which sends him back to the school. When Kotarou finally makes it to the occult research society club room, the witch is there to greet him.
2	"Where Youth Begins"; Transliteration: "Seishun ga Hajimaru Basho" (Japanese: 青春が始まる場所)	July 9, 2016
The witch introduces herself as Akane Senri, a third-year student. After telling her about the girl with the red ribbons, Akane gives Kotarou three shikigami to protect him from her, and Akane has him join the occult research society in exchange. However, Akane is skeptical about his paranormal experiences, but if Kotarou is able to prove that paranormal phenomena exist, she agrees to his request to touch her breasts. To help him in his efforts, Kotarou gets Kotori to join the occult research society. Also in the club is Chihaya Ohtori, a girl who recently transferred into Kotarou's class. Kotarou gets a younger student he knows named Sizuru Nakatsu on the disciplinary committee to help out with the occult research society's club activities. As a result, Sizuru's friend and class representative of Kotarou's class, Lucia Konohana, joins in their activities so as to keep watch over Sizuru and protect her from Kotarou whom she dislikes.
3	"Welcome, Supernatural Phenomena"; Transliteration: "Werukamu, Chōjō Genshō" (Japanese: ウェルカム、超常現象)	July 16, 2016
Kotarou meets Chihaya's butler, Sakuya Ohtori, who immediately dislikes him. The occult research society searches for a tsuchinoko reportedly spotted on campus, but it turns out to be a hoax. During lunch, Sizuru shows Kotarou that she wears an eyepatch to cover her golden-colored right eye. While walking home that night, Kotarou sees the girl with the red ribbons being chased by a large dog. He uses his Rewrite ability to make himself faster, but loses sight of them only to meet a menacing man who summons another large dog to chase after Kotarou. He glimpses a man killing the dog before passing out and later wakes up at a ramen stand thanks to two men who found him in the park. There, he meets Sizuru who is a regular at the stand. Kotarou tells her what happened and even shows her a scar on his hand from the incident, but after taking his hand in hers, Sizuru points out that he does not have a scar.
4	"Until We Return to Those Days"; Transliteration: "Itsuka Ano Hi ni Kaeru Made" (Japanese: いつかあの日に帰るまで)	July 23, 2016
Kotarou tracks down Sougen Esaka, one of the men he met at the ramen stand who owns an antique shop. Esaka gives Kotarou some blurry photos of an unidentifiable animal, but Akane is not impressed by them. Kotarou buys Sizuru a CD, but since she does not own a CD player, he gives her his old MP3 player. The next day, the girl with the red ribbons shows up during school, but only Kotarou can see her. Sizuru takes Kotarou to see where her parents live, but they do not recognize her. Several years earlier, a fire destroyed Sizuru's home, but her parents survived. Sizuru displayed a remarkable healing ability, and her parents accepted a monetary offer to hand her over to a certain institution. However, when Sizuru returned a few days later, she found her parents fighting, and accidentally erased several years worth of her parents' memories. The next day at school, Chihaya and Lucia get in a fight over Chihaya criticizing Lucia for being too much of a clean freak.
5	"Asahi Haruka"; Transliteration: "Asahi Haruka" (Japanese: アサヒハルカ)	July 30, 2016
The occult research society receives a tip about a supposedly cursed girl named Haruka Asahi and Kotarou decides to investigate the urban legend. Shortly thereafter, odd things begin happening around Kotarou such as glass that mysteriously shatters. Kotarou soon discovers that similar things have happened to others connected to Haruka and those who have investigated the urban legend before. Undeterred, Kotarou goes to the orphanage where Haruka once lived, but Lucia is there waiting for him. Kotarou realizes that Lucia is actually Haruka, and Lucia explains that she has the power to poison anything by touch and to break glass at a distance. Although Lucia had unknowingly poisoned Kotarou earlier, he uses his Rewrite ability to immunize himself. Kotarou later learns from Lucia and a teacher, Touka Nishikujou, that they and Sizuru are members of an organization called Guardian whose aim is to protect the world. To do so, they are in pursuit of someone known as the Key who could determine the fate of the world's survival. There is also an opposing organization called Gaia that are likewise looking for the Key. In exchange for keeping this a secret, Kotarou asks Lucia to make him lunch while wearing a maid's uniform.
6	"Occult Club Activity Log"; Transliteration: "Okaken Katsudō Kiroku" (Japanese: オカ研活動記録)	August 6, 2016
Lucia wears a maid's uniform as Kotarou requested, much to her embarrassment. Lucia and Chihaya apologize to each other, prompting Kotarou to suggest the club investigate some of Kazamatsuri's mysteries, but none of them end up as supernatural phenomena. Their next investigation involves uncovering a "rainbow utopia" in the woods, and Kotori brings along her extremely strong dog Chibi-Moth for protection. Deep in the woods, they discover a polluted portion of the river covered in rainbow sludge, killing off and causing birth defects in animals. Shocked by their discovery, the members prepare to leave. On the way back, Kotaoru sees the girl with the red ribbons and chases her to a clearing, but he is suddenly struck by several violent visions involving himself and the girl. The other club members find him on his hands and knees, but the girl is now gone. That night, Akane and Kotarou talk about the adverse effect humans have on the environment, and Akane suggests the easiest way to solve the problem would be to exterminate humanity. The next morning on Sunday, Inoue from the newspaper club calls Kotarou and tells him she is going into the woods to investigate the rainbow swamp, but a few days later, a girl at school tells him that Inoue has been missing since Sunday.
7	"A Lost Place"; Transliteration: "Ushinawareta Basho" (Japanese: 失われた場所)	August 13, 2016
The occult research society is forced to suspend activities following Inoue's disappearance, and in an effort to save the club, Kotarou proposes that they try to find her. While in the forest, Kotarou gets separated from the girls, but when he goes to find them, he gets chased by three large dog-like creatures which eventually attack him, pinning him down. While trying to fend them off, three claw-like blades emerge from his wrist, killing one of the creatures while the other two flee. Kotarou heads towards Lucia's voice and finds her and Sizuru fighting a pack of dinosaur-like creatures, which are controlled by Gaia according to Sizuru. Upon their insistence, Kotarou goes to find the others, but once they meet up, a gigantic flying creature appears and pierces Kotarou's arm with a tendril. Kotarou tells the girls to leave, and after they are gone, the girl with the red ribbons appears and kills the creature. Kotori returns, telling the girl to go away, and takes Kotarou back to the others. It turns out that Akane and Chihaya are members of Gaia, but Sakuya quickly appears and takes them away with him. The next day, Kotarou cannot get in touch with any of the girls.
8	"My Name is Kagari-chan"; Transliteration: "Waga Na wa Kagari-chan" (Japanese: 我が名は篝ちゃん)	August 20, 2016
Three days have passed and Kotarou still cannot get in touch with the other occult research society members. Inoue was found and hospitalized several days earlier, but she is now suffering form amnesia. The shock of the incident lead her and her family to move away from Kazamatsuri. Sizuru shows up at school to say goodbye to Kotarou before disappearing. The girl with the red ribbons comes to Kotarou's house and introduces herself as Kagari. However, she has amnesia and enlists his help to find herself. Kagari shows up at school the next day, but she draws unwanted attention. Kotarou later runs into Inoue who gives him a memory card. On it, he finds pictures of various creatures and hooded figures. Kotarou receives a text from Kotori, but she does not tell him that she is now living in the forest with some tree-like creatures. Meanwhile, Gaia continues their search of the Key while Akane is being groomed to succeed Sakura Kashima as the group's saint. Members of Guardian, including Sizuru and Lucia, continue to defeat monsters in the forest and city.
9	"Fate Begins to Turn"; Transliteration: "Mawari Hajimeru Unmei" (Japanese: 回り始める運命)	August 27, 2016
Kagari gets Kotarou to show her around the city to help in finding herself, but they are followed around by Arata Imamiya from Guardian, Kotori's dog Chibi-Moth, and Pani and Gil per Sakuya's request. When Kagari points out that they are being followed, Kotarou loses them by going through some alleyways. Kotarou runs into Lucia by chance, but she tells him to just forget about her and lead an ordinary life. Kotarou later runs into the summoner he met before, but Chibi-Moth helps him escape with Kagari. They return to Kotarou's home to find it ransacked, but it turns out it was just Pani and Gil making a mess. Kotori calls Kotarou and tells him to take Kagari and follow Chibi-Moth into the woods. Kotori takes them into a sealed off area of the woods filled with various creatures she created. Kotori explains that she is a druid and that she got her powers from a piece of mistletoe containing the memories of a long-dead druid. One of Kotori's duties is to protect Kagari, the Key that Guardian and Gaia are both looking for. Meanwhile, both Guardian and Gaia are preparing for a confrontation during the Harvest Festa. Pani and Gil tell Sakuya where to find Kotori's secret base.
10	"Simply, As Friends"; Transliteration: "Tada, Tomo Toshite" (Japanese: ただ、友として)	September 3, 2016
Ordered by Akane to keep an eye on Kotarou, Sakuya breaks through the barrier into Kotori's secret base and begins training Kotarou per his request. Sakuya is knowledgeable of Kotarou's power, which will cause him to cease to be human if used too excessively. When they run out of supplies, Kotarou and Kagari go out to buy more while the Harvest Festa is in full swing. Afterwards, Sakuya takes them to see Akane, who says she will do what she can to help them while still in Gaia. Guardian discovers that Kotori has been seen in the forest lately, but when Sizuru attempts to leave to help Kotori and Kotarou, Lucia offers to go instead. Lucia runs into three Gaia members and manages to knock out two of them. However, while in the middle of her fight with the third, a guy named Midou who summons a lava-type monster named Fogo, she gets blown away by an explosion and get struck by a spear before falling into a deep chasm. Meanwhile, Akane tells Chihaya to go to be with Sakuya and leave Gaia permanently. Akane also gives Chihaya a letter to give to Kotarou.
11	"Countdown"; Transliteration: "Kauntodaun" (Japanese: カウントダウン)	September 10, 2016
While looking for Kotori's secret base, Chihaya comes across Lucia wounded and unconscious. Kotorou and Kotori find them and take them back to the secret base where Kotori heals Lucia with Kagari's help. Lucia stays at the base while she recovers and tells the others that she cannot bring herself to harm Kagari after she saved her life. Akane's behavior begins to be influenced by Sakura who has collapsed and is near death. Akane gives Midou Gaia's ultimate monster, the Earth Dragon, as long as he will protect the Key with it. On the last day of the Harvest Festa, Midou and two other Gaia members head to the forest and engage in several skirmishes with Guardian scouting parties. Guardian surmises that the Key must be involved, and decide to send in combat troops into the forest towards Kotori's secret base. At Gaia's headquarters, a choir group begins to sing the song of destruction.
12	"The Song of Destruction"; Transliteration: "Horobi no Uta" (Japanese: 滅びの歌)	September 17, 2016
Midou breaks into Kotori's secret base and goes on a rampage, destroying the whole base with the Earth Dragon and Fogo. Kotori uses her parents, who had died in a car crash and who she remade as familiars, to distract Midou and allow everyone to escape into the forest. Midou catches up to Kotarou who protects Kagari long enough for Esaka and several other Guardian members to arrive. However, when they attempt to kill Kagari, Midou protects them, allowing Kotarou and Kagari to escape before Midou's life force is ultimately consumed by the familiars he wields. Sizuru regroups with Kotarou and the others, and they take refuge in an alternate space connected to Kazamatsuri called the city of stone created by Gaia. Meanwhile, Sakura presides over the choir singing the song of destruction, hoping to bring an end to humanity. Kotarou and the others are summoned back to Kazamatsuri along with a gigantic tree. Various monsters begin attacking people as the forest spreads rapidly into the city.
13	"The Promise I Made With You"; Transliteration: "Kimi to Kawashita Yakusoku" (Japanese: 君とかわした約束)	September 24, 2016
The song of destruction causes worldwide devastation with natural disasters. In a fight with Esaka to protect Kagari, Kotarou uses his Rewrite ability, but Sizuru intercedes on a motorcycle, throwing her and Esaka off a building where they continue fighting. As a result of rewriting himself too much, Kotarou begins to cease being human. Kotori tells Kotarou that she found him injured in the forest when Kagari first appeared years ago, and Kagari had implanted one of her ribbons into Kotarou to save his life. The ribbon put too much of a burden on Kotarou, so in an effort to save his life, Kagari removes the ribbon and Pani and Gil sacrifice themselves for his sake. Akane becomes the new saint following Sakura's death as she ushers in the end of the world. The song of destruction begins again, which causes Kotarou to begin transforming into a tree-like creature as a large tree grows around Kagari. Kagari suggests that he kill her to save the world, but Kotarou cannot bring himself to do it. Kagari's salvation causes all humans to begin to disappear in glowing lights. The tree eventually envelopes both Kotarou and Kagari.
14	"Three Cups of Coffee"; Transliteration: "San-pai no Kōhī" (Japanese: 三杯のコーヒー)	January 14, 2017
Kotarou awakens in a ruined Kazamatsuri with various inconsistent memories. He finds Kagari looking over a grid of glowing lines on a daisy-covered hill in the forest, but he does not remember her. Kagari kills him when he tries to get close to her, only for him to awaken in his bed later. This repeats several times until Kotarou is allowed to sit near Kagari who continues to pour over the grid, which Kotarou now realizes is a dense mass of information on a theory of life. Wanting to help Kagari in her research, Kotarou brings her some coffee, although it takes three cups until she warms up him. Kotarou realizes that he is willing to risk his life to maintain his thin connection with her.
15	"Honeymoon Over a Silent Ocean"; Transliteration: "Shizuka na Umi no Mitsu no Tsuki" (Japanese: 静かな海の蜜の月)	January 21, 2017
Kotarou rewrites his consciousness to help him understand Kagari's theory of life, but there is a point where he hits a dead end. Kotarou discovers that a power called Aurora governs the existence of life in the universe. Kagari's research is a record of every path humanity could potentially take, and she has been searching for a way for life to survive. For a chance of pace, Kotarou takes Kagari out into the city and the two dance together on the top of a building. However, various monsters are summoned by Sakura to kill Kagari and destroy any chance for life to survive. Kotarou uses his powers to protect Kagari, but since he cannot protect her alone, he summons the girls from the occult research society as well as Yoshino and his gang to help him.
16	"A Truth No One Knows"; Transliteration: "Dare mo Shiranai Shinjitsu" (Japanese: 誰も知らない真実)	January 28, 2017
Everyone immediately gets to exterminating the monsters sent by Sakura, and after eliminating the first wave, the occult research society look over Kagari's theory with a copy Kotarou makes. Life is extinguished in most of them, but humans evolve in one of them, only for their civilization to be destroyed by the Key. Kotori tells the others that according to legend, the Key is looking for good memories. Kagari makes more progress with her theory, and it is completed when Kotarou adds a small piece to the theory saying he wants to meet her again someday. However, Sakura sends more monsters while Kagari is in the process of putting her theory into action. Everyone fights the monsters, but Kotarou is eventually the only one left. However, Sakuya appears and manages to help stave off the monsters, although Kotarou also rewrites himself to the point where he is no longer human. This gives Kagari enough time to put her theory into action, which sends Kotarou up into the sky, only for him to turn back and realize that they were on the Moon the entire time. In the process, Kagari sends the remaining Aurora to Earth to begin life on the planet one last time.
17	"Earth-Saving Hunter"; Transliteration: "Chikyū Kyūsai Hantā" (Japanese: 地球救済ハンター)	February 4, 2017
As a child, Kotarou felt that he could not fit in with those around him. His parents take him to sit in on lectures at the Martel Group, an environmental protection organization, where he meets a young Akane who can only say a single word. At night, Kotarou uses his superpowers to hunt and kill various creatures he finds at school or in the forest, dubbing himself the "Earth-saving hunter". However, he is nearly killed by several dinosaur-like monsters one night, only for them to be destroyed by Esaka and his men. Kotaoru later meets with Esaka, but he says that Kotarou is simply mistaken about there being any monsters. Kotarou's neighbors bring over their daughter Kotori one day to watch her while both of their parents go to the Martel Group. Shortly thereafter, Kotori's parents stop going to the Martel Group, but in exchange, they have her take care of a formerly abused dog named Pero. When Pero gets loose, Kotaoru searches for him and brings him back to Kotori, but Pero dies shortly after that. Spurred on by Kotori's love for Pero despite caring for him being nothing more than a duty to her, Kotarou decides to leave Martel.
18	"Superhuman Qualities"; Transliteration: "Chōjin no Shishitsu" (Japanese: 超人の資質)	February 11, 2017
Esaka invites Kotarou to join Guardian shortly after starting high school, and after an argument with his parents about leaving Martel, Kotarou decides to take Esaka up on his offer and leaves home. Before he leaves, he promises Kotori to show her around the Harvest Festival. Esaka takes Kotarou to a facility to take part in basic training with other superhumans. Kotarou is ranked last out of 22 other trainees, and three others are also on his team: Arata Imamiya, Touka Nishikujou, and a girl named Nagai. The strongest team of the trainees is led by a boy named Mikuni. Esaka offers Kotarou a bit of hand-to-hand combat training as well as some advice. The last stage in basic training is a mock battle with the instructors, but only Mikuni's team manages to defeat them. The instructors hold a party for the trainees on the last day of basic training, and Kotarou learns from Esaka that Nagai quit.
19	"Forest of Tragedy"; Transliteration: "Sangeki no Mori" (Japanese: 惨劇の森)	February 18, 2017
Kotarou is stationed in Kazamatsuri for an upcoming mission and takes a few days off from Guardian, during which time he finds Akane and takes her back to her orphanage. Esaka tells Kotarou that Guardian is searching for the Key, and Kotarou is to monitor the city with Touka and Arata by posing as civilians. When they hear an emergency signal, Arata and Touka decide to head into the forest, and Kotarou runs after them. Kotarou finds Akane's name tag and tries to search for her. As night falls, Kotarou sees a large Earth dragon attacking Mikuni, only for the dragon to kill him after having already killed most of his team. Kotarou eventually finds Akane up a tree, but he first manages to kill a hound-type monster before catching Akane as she falls. Kotarou sees a light in the forest, and after hiding Akane, goes to investigate. There, he finds Kagari, but decides to let her go. Kotarou later takes Akane back to the orphanage and then reports back to Esaka, leaving out that he encountered the Key. Kotarou talks to Esaka about wanting to be more useful, and Esaka suggests he join a private security firm affiliated with Guardian to fight overseas.
20	"Moving On From a Standstill"; Transliteration: "Teitai no Sono Saki e" (Japanese: 停滞のその先へ)	February 25, 2017
Kotarou is deeply disturbed after killing someone in self-defense for the first time. He grows close to a fellow soldier named Luis as well as some local kids including a young girl named Jasmine. After working as a mercenary for two years, Kotarou takes part in a mission to take out a narcotics factory where monsters have been spotted. However, Luis accidentally kills several of the local kids who were being paid to summon and control a huge monster. Kotarou and Luis decide to try to save the survivors, including Jasmine, but helicopters begin razing the factory and the surrounding area. Luis stays behind to give Kotarou and the kids a chance to escape, but Luis is soon engulfed in the flames. Kotaoru uses his Rewrite ability to give him enough strength to save the kids before returning to his home base. Afterwards, he gives Jasmine some of his savings and sends her to live in a safe city with the other kids. Kotarou starts going on solo missions and saves various kids, both summoners and superhumans alike, to go live with Jasmine and the others. Kotarou gets a call from Esaka to return to Japan, and he says goodbye to Jasmine before leaving.
21	"Reunion"; Transliteration: "Saikai" (Japanese: 再会)	March 4, 2017
When Kotarou goes back to Kazamatsuri, he is drawn to Kagari, who tells him that she must find good memories to prevent the destruction of life on Earth. He agrees to help her with the intention of trying to end the conflict between Gaia and Guardian. Kotarou volunteers to monitor a low-priority zone in the forest so he can operate freely, giving him time to infiltrate Gaia and become a summoner. Kotarou learns about an internal power struggle within Gaia and plans to use it to his advantage. Meanwhile, he keeps in contact with Jasmine and continues sending her information he uncovers. While walking in the forest, Kotarou finds that Kotori is now a druid and has been protecting Kagari with a barrier.
22	"Battle Behind the Scenes"; Transliteration: "Antō" (Japanese: 暗闘)	March 11, 2017
Kotarou gets more involved with the power struggle between Sakura and Suzaki within Gaia. As Suzaki starts to put more trust in Kotarou, he shows him the city of stone underneath Kazamatsuri and unveils his plan to use it as a shelter following the end of the world. Kotarou gets into a fight with Kotori about how she turned her parents into familiars after they died. Suzaki devises a plan to get rid of Sakura and her faction, but Kotarou surreptitiously tips off Sakura about it, enabling her to remain in power. Kagari gets upset at Kotarou for being able to accept life going extinct if it meant saving any connections he has with people, however trivial. Kagari goes out of control, but Kotarou stops her with a kiss. Although Kotaoru professes his love for her, Kagari pushes him away and runs off.
23	"Follower of the Lodestar"; Transliteration: "Kagaribi o Ou Mono" (Japanese: 篝火を追うもの)	March 18, 2017
Kotarou starts killing scouting monsters in the forest, and even starts killing members of Gaia who have honed in on Kagari. When Guardian finds Kagari, Kotarou rewrites himself and rushes to find her, only to discover the Earth Dragon having killed various Guardian members. Before Kagari can go out of control again, Kotarou manages to take her to his safe house in the city. After Esaka comes back to Japan, Guardian captures Suzaki, but Kotarou kills him the moment he realizes his true identity. The conflict between Guardian and Gaia escalates and Sakura starts making preparations for her plan to destroy the world. Kagari escapes from Kotarou's safe house, and he goes to search for her in the forest. He runs into Kotori and kills her parents, telling her that she was a nuisance to him all along. Kotarou destroys a Guardian helicopter, prompting Esaka to intercept him and try to kill him. Kotarou rewrites himself again and manages to mortally wound Esaka, but he apologizes for betraying him.
24	"A Promise Fulfilled with You"; Transliteration: "Kimi to Kanaeta Yakusoku" (Japanese: 君と叶えた約束)	March 25, 2017
Kotarou takes Kagari to the daisy-covered hill before heading back into the city to try to stop Gaia's choir from singing the song of destruction, which is already starting to destroy the world. Although Touka and Arata think Kotarou betrayed them, he manages to save them as they are heading to Gaia's headquarters and they question him on hiding his powers and motives. He tells them that he is leaving the future to them. Kotarou makes it to Gaia's temple and fights the Earth Dragon, ultimately killing it after rewriting himself, turning him further into a monster. He heads to the top of the temple, but finds all of the choir members dead with Sakura overlooking the ruined city. Kotarou later finds Akane and gives her two of Kotori's familiars. He heads back to Kagari, who thanks him for the good memories he was able to give her, but since he was too late to prevent the world's destruction, Kotarou unwillingly stabs Kagari and then collapses. Jasmine reveals the truth behind Gaia and Guardian to the entire world, which helps humanity recover in the aftermath. A few years later, the girls of the occult research society investigate a huge tree in Kazamatsuri and draw out a humanoid familiar who looks like Kotarou who says he can take humans out of the Solar System with enough contractors. Kotarou takes the girls to the Moon where he finally reunites with Kagari as the two embrace and share a kiss, to the other girls' shock.
