= Circle of Fifth =

2012 studio album

Studio album by Ayana, Mami Kawada, Ayaka Kitazawa, Kotoko, Lia, Ray, Runa Mizutani, Rita, Nagi Yanagi
- Released: October 24, 2012
- Genre: J-pop
- Length: 117:28
- Label: Key Sounds Label
- Director: Kumiko Murayama
- Producer: Shinji Orito

Circle of Fifth is a Japanese pop music studio album produced by Shinji Orito featuring nine vocalists. It was released on October 24, 2012 by Key Sounds Label in two discs. The album peaked at No. 81 on the Japanese Oricon weekly albums chart.

== Track listing ==
All tracks are written by Shinji Orito.

Disc 1
| No. | Title | Lyrics | Artist / Arrangement | Length |
|---|---|---|---|---|
| 1. | "Shooting star" (New arrangement) | Kotoko | Kotoko / MintJam a2c | 4:56 |
| 2. | "Precious" (New arrangement) | Mami Kawada | Mami Kawada / Yoshino Yoshikawa | 4:48 |
| 3. | "Sora no Mori de" (空の森で) (New arrangement) | Mami Takubo | Mami Kawada / Kenji Ogura | 5:34 |
| 4. | "Light colors" (New arrangement) | Jun Maeda | Lia / Kohei Yamada | 5:59 |
| 5. | "Torch" (New arrangement) | Kai | Lia / Kenji Ogura | 4:09 |
| 6. | "Starting Over (Reproduction Staycool 2007 Edition)" (Original recording) | Yuriko Mori | Lia / Kentaro Fukushi | 6:14 |
| 7. | "Tori no Uta" (鳥の詩) | Jun Maeda | Lia / Kohei Yamada | 6:13 |
| 8. | "Itsuwaranai Kimi e" (偽らない君へ) (Original recording) | Ryukishi07 | Nagi Yanagi / Shōji Morifuji | 6:48 |
| 9. | "Alicemagic" (Original recording) | Yūto Tonokawa | Rita / MintJam | 4:33 |
| 10. | "Koibumi" (恋文) (Original recording) | Yūto Tonokawa | Nagi Yanagi / Manyo | 6:28 |
| 11. | "Philosophyz" (Original recording) | Yūto Tonokawa | Runa Mizutani / MintJam | 4:52 |
| 12. | "Kaze no Tadoritsuku Basho" (風の辿り着く場所) (New arrangement) | Jun Maeda | Ayana / Kentaro Fukushi | 6:21 |

Disc 2
| No. | Title | Lyrics | Artist / Arrangement | Length |
|---|---|---|---|---|
| 1. | "Sign" (Original recording) | Kotoko | Ray / Kazuya Takase | 4:45 |
| 2. | "Kokuhaku" (告白) (Original recording) | Kotoko | Ray / Kazuya Takase | 5:32 |
| 3. | "World Link" (Original recording) | Kai | Kotoko / Donmaru | 4:38 |
| 4. | "Teller of World" (New arrangement) | Kai | Kotoko / Shinya Saito | 5:38 |
| 5. | "Last Word" (ラストワード Rasuto Wādo) (Original song) | Kai | Ayaka Kitazawa / Suzumu | 4:42 |
| 6. | "Sunbright" (サンブライト Sanburaito) (Vocal version of background music track from Rewrite) | Ryukishi07 | Ayaka Kitazawa / MintJam Terra | 4:37 |
| 7. | "Orpheus (Kimi to Kanaderu Ashita e no Uta) Ayaka Ver." (Orpheus (君と奏でる明日への詩) Ayaka Ver.) | Takahiro Baba | Ayaka Kitazawa / Ryosuke Nakanishi | 6:04 |
| 8. | "Fortune Card" (Original song) | Kai | Ayaka Kitazawa / Masatomo Ota | 4:28 |
| 9. | "Perseids" (Original song) | Kai | Ayaka Kitazawa / Kentaro Fukushi | 5:24 |
| 10. | "Bokura no Tabi" (僕らの旅) (Vocal version of "Shōjotachi no Gogo 4-ji-han" (少女たちの午後４時半) from Little Busters!) | Leo Kashida | Ayaka Kitazawa / Luka | 4:45 |
| Total length: | | | | 117:28 |
