= Music of Rewrite =

Rewrite and Rewrite Harvest festa! discography
- Studio albums: 1
- Soundtrack albums: 3
- Singles: 7
- Remixes: 7

Rewrite is a visual novel developed by Key and published by VisualArt's in 2011. A fan disc for Rewrite titled Rewrite Harvest festa! was released in 2012. The discography of Rewrite and Harvest festa! consists of one studio album, seven singles, three soundtracks and seven remix albums. The core of the discography consists of two original soundtrack albums for the visual novels, one for Rewrite and the other for Harvest festa!. The soundtracks were produced by Key Sounds Label and released in 2011 and 2012. The music on the soundtracks was composed and arranged by Jun Maeda, Shinji Orito, Maiko Iuchi, Sōshi Hosoi, and Ryō Mizutsuki. An image song album was released in 2016. Seven singles were released between 2011 and 2017: two theme song singles for the visual novel, and five singles for the anime adaptation. A third soundtrack for the anime adaptation was released in 2017. The remix albums contains tracks from the games remixed by various artists and were released between 2011 and 2021.

== Albums ==
=== Soil ===
Soil is a remix album which contains a selection of songs from the visual novel Rewrite, remixed by various artists. The album is otherwise composed, and produced by Shinji Orito, Maiko Iuchi, Sōshi Hosoi, and Ryō Mizutsuki. This album was released as a bonus item, included with the limited edition first printing of the PC version of Rewrite released on June 24, 2011 by Key Sounds Label bearing the catalog number KSLA-0070. As a result, it was not released for individual sale. The album contains one disc with ten remixed background music tracks from the visual novel. Annabel provides vocals for the song "Reply".

Track listing
No.	Title	Music	Arrangement	Length
1.	"Hinagiku" (ヒナギク Daisy)	Maiko Iuchi	Keiji Inai (Imagine)	3:37
2.	"Sanka" (散花 Scattered Flowers)	Ryō Mizutsuki	Nakayama Raiden	3:51
3.	"Watabōshi" (綿帽子 Bridal Headdress)	Sōshi Hosoi	Shōhei Tsuchiya (Zuntata)	4:16
4.	"Phobia"	Sōshi Hosoi	Sōichirō Sakamoto (Supersweep)	4:09
5.	"Asagao" (アサガオ Morning Glory)	Maiko Iuchi	Manyo (Little Wing)	4:08
6.	"Exploration"	Shinji Orito	Maki Kirioka (Procyon Studio)	4:02
7.	"Genkyō ～ Nirinsō" (幻境 ～ ニリンソウ Illusion Border ～ Soft Wildflower)	Ryō Mizutsuki ("Genkyō"); Sōshi Hosoi ("Nirinsō")	Technouchi	5:11
8.	"Retribution"	Shinji Orito	Soyo Oka	4:22
9.	"Reply" (Performed by Annabel)	Shinji Orito	Myu	4:38
10.	"Anthurium" (アンスリウム Ansuriumu)	Ryō Mizutsuki	Hideki Sakamoto (Noisycroak)	4:07
Total length:				42:21

=== Rewrite Original Soundtrack ===
The Rewrite Original Soundtrack, from the visual novel Rewrite, was first released on August 12, 2011 at Comiket 80 in Japan by Key Sounds Label bearing the catalog numbers KSLA-0073–0075. It was later released for general sale on October 28, 2011. The soundtrack contains three discs totaling 63 songs composed, arranged, and produced by Jun Maeda, Shinji Orito, Maiko Iuchi, Sōshi Hosoi, Ryō Mizutsuki, Anant-Garde Eyes, MintJam, Donmaru, Manyo, and Manack. Four artists provide vocals for seven songs: Runa Mizutani sings "Philosophyz" and "Yami no Kanata e", Aoi Tada sings "Watari no Uta" and "Canoe", Nagi Yanagi sings "Koibumi" and "Itsuwaranai Kimi e", and Psychic Lover performs "Rewrite".

Disc 1
No.	Title	Music	Arrangement	Length
1.	"Philosophyz" (Lyrics by Yūto Tonokawa; Performed by Runa Mizutani)	Shinji Orito	MintJam	4:51
2.	"Tabi" (旅 Journey)	Jun Maeda	Anant-Garde Eyes	1:54
3.	"Mebuki" (芽吹き Bud)	Ryō Mizutsuki	Ryō Mizutsuki	3:26
4.	"Fertilizer"	Shinji Orito	Maiko Iuchi	2:49
5.	"Karai" (花蕾 Flower Bud)	Maiko Iuchi	Maiko Iuchi	3:51
6.	"Kajitsu" (果実 Fruit)	Ryō Mizutsuki	Ryō Mizutsuki	2:12
7.	"Raised Bed"	Ryō Mizutsuki	Ryō Mizutsuki	4:36
8.	"Nirinsō" (ニリンソウ Soft Windflower)	Sōshi Hosoi	Sōshi Hosoi	3:08
9.	"Asagao" (アサガオ Morning Glory)	Maiko Iuchi	Maiko Iuchi	2:30
10.	"Anthurium" (アンスリウム Ansuriumu)	Ryō Mizutsuki	Ryō Mizutsuki	2:45
11.	"Carnation" (カーネーション Kānēshon)	Shinji Orito	Maiko Iuchi	2:41
12.	"Sunbright" (サンブライト Sanburaito)	Shinji Orito	MintJam	3:38
13.	"Hinagiku" (ヒナギク Daisy)	Maiko Iuchi	Maiko Iuchi	2:58
14.	"Honesty"	Shinji Orito	Maiko Iuchi	3:16
15.	"Shinsō Shinrin" (深層森林 Deep Forest)	Maiko Iuchi	Maiko Iuchi	2:09
16.	"Exploration"	Shinji Orito	Shinji Orito	3:49
17.	"Tōdo" (凍土 Frozen Soil)	Sōshi Hosoi	Sōshi Hosoi	2:47
18.	"Kappanbyō" (褐斑病 Cercospora)	Maiko Iuchi	Maiko Iuchi	2:33
19.	"Watabōshi" (綿帽子 Bridal Headdress)	Sōshi Hosoi	Sōshi Hosoi	2:37
20.	"DIS is a Pain"	Shinji Orito	Shinji Orito	1:39
21.	"Eruptible"	Shinji Orito	Shinji Orito	2:28
22.	"Yami no Kanata e" (闇の彼方へ Beyond the Darkness) (Lyrics by Yūichirō Tsukagoshi; Performed by Runa Mizutani)	Yūichirō Tsukagoshi	Yūichirō Tsukagoshi	5:14

Disc 2
No.	Title	Music	Arrangement	Length
1.	"Rewrite" (Lyrics by Yoffy; Performed by Psychic Lover)	Yoffy	Kenichiro Ōishi	3:55
2.	"Retribution"	Shinji Orito	Shinji Orito	2:19
3.	"Potted One"	Maiko Iuchi	Maiko Iuchi	3:02
4.	"YO-SHI-NO"	Shinji Orito	Shinji Orito	2:13
5.	"Sorrowless"	Shinji Orito	Maiko Iuchi	2:58
6.	"Yuriha" (揺葉 Swinging Leaves)	Shinji Orito	Maiko Iuchi	3:36
7.	"Sanka" (散花 Scattered Flowers)	Ryō Mizutsuki	Ryō Mizutsuki	3:36
8.	"Genkyō" (幻境 Illusion Border)	Ryō Mizutsuki	Ryō Mizutsuki	3:29
9.	"Kari" (刈り Shear)	Maiko Iuchi	Maiko Iuchi	2:34
10.	"Scene of Carnage"	Maiko Iuchi	Maiko Iuchi	2:11
11.	"Scene of Carnage Aggressiveness"	Maiko Iuchi	Maiko Iuchi	2:11
12.	"Phobic"	Sōshi Hosoi	Sōshi Hosoi	1:33
13.	"Phobia"	Sōshi Hosoi	Sōshi Hosoi	3:35
14.	"Scene Shifts There"	Ryō Mizutsuki	Ryō Mizutsuki	4:22
15.	"Kuroboshibyō" (黒星病 Black Spot Disease)	Sōshi Hosoi	Sōshi Hosoi	2:25
16.	"Koshi" (枯死 Wither)	Sōshi Hosoi	Sōshi Hosoi	2:16
17.	"Finale"	Maiko Iuchi	Maiko Iuchi	2:36
18.	"Reply"	Shinji Orito	Ryō Mizutsuki	4:48
19.	"Toxoplasma"	Sōshi Hosoi	Sōshi Hosoi	2:46
20.	"Minori" (実り Ripen)	Ryō Mizutsuki	Ryō Mizutsuki	2:58
21.	"Philosophy of Ours"	Shinji Orito	Manack	3:45
22.	"Philosophy of Yours"	Shinji Orito	Shinji Orito	3:14
23.	"Exploration2 Symphonic"	Shinji Orito	Manack	4:01

Disc 3
No.	Title	Music	Arrangement	Length
1.	"Philosophyz (GT Ver.)"	Shinji Orito	MintJam	4:53
2.	"Rewrite (instrumental)"	Yoffy	Kenichiro Ōishi	3:55
3.	"Remembrance"	Shinji Orito	Manack	4:26
4.	"Daichi" (大地 Ground)	Sōshi Hosoi	Sōshi Hosoi	2:27
5.	"Radiance"	Sōshi Hosoi	Sōshi Hosoi	3:18
6.	"Koiuta" (恋歌 Love Song) (Performed by Nagi Yanagi)	Shinji Orito	Manyo	2:44
7.	"Koibumi" (恋文 Love Letter) (Lyrics by Yūto Tonokawa; Performed by Nagi Yanagi)	Shinji Orito	Manyo	6:28
8.	"Itsuwaranai Kimi e" (偽らない君へ To You Who Does Not Lie) (Lyrics by Ryukishi07; Performed by Nagi Yanagi)	Shinji Orito	Shōji Morifuji	6:46
9.	"Watari no Uta" (渡りの詩 Ferry Poem) (Lyrics by Jun Maeda; Performed by Aoi Tada)	Jun Maeda	Anant-Garde Eyes	4:15
10.	"Canoe" (Lyrics by Jun Maeda and Romeo Tanaka; Performed by Aoi Tada)	Jun Maeda	Anant-Garde Eyes	6:06
11.	"Hinagiku (orgel Ver.)" (ヒナギク Daisy)	Maiko Iuchi	Donmaru	3:02
12.	"Philosophyz (Game size Ver)" (Lyrics by Yūto Tonokawa; Performed by Runa Mizutani)	Shinji Orito	MintJam	2:57
13.	"Rewrite (Game size Ver)" (Lyrics by Yoffy; Performed by Psychic Lover)	Yoffy	Kenichiro Ōishi	1:33
14.	"Yami no Kanata e (Game size Ver)" (闇の彼方へ Beyond the Darkness) (Lyrics by Yūichirō Tsukagoshi; Performed by Runa Mizutani)	Yūichirō Tsukagoshi	Yūichirō Tsukagoshi	3:27
15.	"Koibumi (Game size Ver)" (恋文 Love Letter) (Lyrics by Yūto Tonokawa; Performed by Nagi Yanagi)	Shinji Orito	Manyo	4:24
16.	"Itsuwaranai Kimi e (Game size Ver)" (偽らない君へ To You Who Does Not Lie) (Lyrics by Ryukishi07; Performed by Nagi Yanagi)	Shinji Orito	Shōji Morifuji	4:11
17.	"Bonus Track (Horobi no Uta)" (Bonus Track (滅びの歌 Song of Destruction); Produced by reversing the melodies of "Tabi")	Jun Maeda, Shinji Orito		1:30
18.	"Bonus Track (Lucia Chakushin'on)" (Bonus Track (ルチア着信音 Lucia's Ringtone))	Shinji Orito		1:07
Total length:				205:07

=== Branch ===
Branch is a remix album which contains a selection of songs from the visual novel Rewrite, remixed by various artists. The album is otherwise composed, and produced by Jun Maeda, Shinji Orito, Maiko Iuchi, Sōshi Hosoi, and Ryō Mizutsuki. The album was released on December 29, 2011 at Comiket 81 by Key Sounds Label bearing the catalog number KSLA-0076. The album contains eight remixed background music tracks from the visual novel. Three artists provide vocals for five songs: Annabel provides the chorus for "Orbita", Mao sings "Fertilizer" and "Kajitsu Renka", and Nagi Yanagi sings "Little Forest" and "Reply".

Track listing
No.	Title	Music	Arrangement	Length
1.	"Tabi" (旅 Journey)	Jun Maeda	Keiji Inai	2:30
2.	"Fertilizer" (Lyrics by Ryukishi07; Performed by Mao)	Shinji Orito	Manyo	5:09
3.	"Nirinsō" (ニリンソウ Soft Windflower)	Sōshi Hosoi	Maki Kirioka	4:15
4.	"Little Forest" (Lyrics and performance by Nagi Yanagi)	Maiko Iuchi	Maki Kirioka	4:41
5.	"Orbita" (Lyrics by Ayaha and Manyo; Performed by Annabel)	Maiko Iuchi	Manyo	5:03
6.	"Kajitsu Renka" (過日憐歌 Love Song From the Other Day) (Lyrics by Yūto Tonokawa; Performed by Mao)	Ryō Mizutsuki	Hideki Sakamoto	6:09
7.	"Daichi ～ Radiance" (大地 ～ Radiance Ground ～ Radiance)	Sōshi Hosoi	Hideki Sakamoto	5:26
8.	"Reply" (Lyrics and performance by Nagi Yanagi)	Shinji Orito	Keiji Inai	5:12
Total length:				38:25

=== Feast ===
Feast is the original soundtrack from the visual novel Rewrite Harvest festa!. It was first released with the original release of the game on July 27, 2012 in Japan, and is produced by Key Sounds Label bearing the catalog number KSLA-0081. The soundtrack contains one disc with 14 music tracks composed, arranged, and produced by Shinji Orito, Maiko Iuchi, Sōshi Hosoi, Ryō Mizutsuki, Yūichirō Tsukagoshi of NanosizeMir, and Manabu Miwa. Aoi Tada sings the full and game size versions of "Harvest", and Runa Mizutani of NanosizeMir sings the full and game size versions of "Sasayaka na Hajimari".

Track listing
No.	Title	Music	Arrangement	Length
1.	"Harvest" (Lyrics by Yūto Tonokawa; Performed by Aoi Tada)	Maiko Iuchi	Maiko Iuchi	4:10
2.	"Irrigated Land"	Yūichirō Tsukagoshi	Yūichirō Tsukagoshi	3:32
3.	"Hōga" (萌芽 Sprout)	Shinji Orito	Shinji Orito, Manabu Miwa	4:20
4.	"Moonbright" (ムーンブライト Mūnburaito)	Shinji Orito	Ryō Mizutsuki	3:34
5.	"Quaesitor"	Sōshi Hosoi	Sōshi Hosoi	3:26
6.	"Fight for nowhere"	Shinji Orito	Shinji Orito	3:00
7.	"Winners!"	Shinji Orito	Shinji Orito	1:06
8.	"Redemptor"	Sōshi Hosoi	Sōshi Hosoi	3:41
9.	"Ai o Sosogu" (愛を灌ぐ Fill With Love)	Maiko Iuchi	Ryō Mizutsuki	4:52
10.	"Yotsuyu" (夜露 Evening Dew)	Shinji Orito	Manabu Miwa	4:48
11.	"Sasayaka na Hajimari" (ささやかなはじまり Modest Beginning) (Lyrics by NanosizeMir; Performed by Runa Mizutani)	Yūichirō Tsukagoshi	Yūichirō Tsukagoshi	5:56
12.	"Irrigated Land (echo)"	Yūichirō Tsukagoshi	Yūichirō Tsukagoshi	3:32
13.	"Harvest (Game size Ver)" (Lyrics by Yūto Tonokawa; Performed by Aoi Tada)	Maiko Iuchi	Maiko Iuchi	1:39
14.	"Sasayaka na Hajimari (Game size Ver)" (ささやかなはじまり Modest Beginning) (Lyrics by NanosizeMir; Performed by Runa Mizutani)	Yūichirō Tsukagoshi	Yūichirō Tsukagoshi	2:20
Total length:				49:56

=== Dye Mixture ===
Dye Mixture is a remix album with songs taken from the Rewrite and Rewrite Harvest festa! visual novels and arranged into rock versions. It was released on December 29, 2012 at Comiket 83 in Japan by Key Sounds Label bearing the catalog number KSLA-0091. The album contains one disc with ten tracks all arranged by the rock group MintJam. Three artists provide vocals for three songs: Aoi Tada sings "Harvest", Nagi Yanagi sings "Koibumi", and Runa Mizutani sings "Sasayaka na Hajimari". The album is otherwise composed and produced by Shinji Orito, Sōshi Hosoi, Maiko Iuchi, and NanosizeMir.

Track listing
No.	Title	Music	Arrangement	Length
1.	"Harvest" (Lyrics by Yūto Tonokawa; Performed by Aoi Tada)	Maiko Iuchi	a2c, Terra	4:11
2.	"Potted One"	Maiko Iuchi	Terra	2:57
3.	"Kari" (刈り Shear)	Maiko Iuchi	a2c, Terra	2:54
4.	"Fight for nowhere"	Shinji Orito	a2c	3:46
5.	"Sorrowless"	Shinji Orito	a2c, Terra	3:27
6.	"Remembrance"	Shinji Orito	a2c, Terra	3:47
7.	"Koibumi" (恋文 Love Letter) (Lyrics by Yūto Tonokawa; Performed by Nagi Yanagi)	Shinji Orito	a2c	6:26
8.	"Radiance"	Sōshi Hosoi	a2c	4:53
9.	"Reply"	Shinji Orito	a2c	5:00
10.	"Sasayaka na Hajimari" (ささやかなはじまり Modest Beginning) (Lyrics by NanosizeMir; Performed by Runa Mizutani)	Yūichirō Tsukagoshi	a2c	5:54
Total length:				43:15

=== Crann Mor ===
Crann Mor (Irish for Great Tree) is a remix album with songs taken from the Rewrite visual novel. It was released on December 29, 2015 at Comiket 89 bearing the catalog number KSLA-0112. The album contains one disc with 12 tracks remixed by Hideki Higuchi. Aoi Tada provide vocals for two songs: "Kono Ki no Shita de" and "Sleeping Forest". The album is otherwise composed and produced by Jun Maeda, Shinji Orito, Maiko Iuchi, Sōshi Hosoi and Ryō Mizutsuki.

Track listing
No.	Title	Music	Length
1.	"Tabi" (旅 Journey)	Jun Maeda, Ryō Mizutsuki	4:04
2.	"Mebuki" (芽吹き Bud)	Ryō Mizutsuki	4:20
3.	"Karai" (花蕾 Flower Bud)	Maiko Iuchi	3:30
4.	"Asagao" (アサガオ Morning Glory)	Maiko Iuchi	3:11
5.	"Nirinsō" (ニリンソウ Soft Windflower)	Sōshi Hosoi	6:20
6.	"Kono Ki no Shita de" (この木の下で Under This Tree) (Lyrics by Kai; Performed by Aoi Tada)	Ryō Mizutsuki	6:48
7.	"Raised Bed"	Ryō Mizutsuki	4:18
8.	"Remembrance"	Shinji Orito	5:00
9.	"Sorrowless"	Shinji Orito	3:37
10.	"Yuriha" (揺葉)	Shinji Orito	3:45
11.	"Hinagiku" (ヒナギク Daisy)	Maiko Iuchi	3:58
12.	"Sleeping Forest" (Lyrics by Kai; Performed by Aoi Tada)	Ryō Mizutsuki	6:07
Total length:			54:58

=== Selene ===
Selene is a remix album with songs taken from the Rewrite and Rewrite Harvest festa! visual novels remixed into rock and electronic dance music. It was bundled with Rewrite+ released on July 29, 2016 bearing the catalog number KSLA-0116. The album contains one disc with 11 tracks remixed by a variety of artists. The album is otherwise composed and produced by Shinji Orito, Sōshi Hosoi and Maiko Iuchi. "Philosophyz (Mizonokuchi Yūma remix)" is performed by Runa Mizutani, and "Sunbright (ALR Remix)" is performed by Ayaka Kitazawa.

Track listing
No.	Title	Music	Arrangement	Length
1.	"Philosophyz (Mizonokuchi Yūma remix)" (Lyrics by Yūto Tonokawa; Performed by Runa Mizutani)	Shinji Orito	Yūma Mizonokuchi	4:43
2.	"DIS is a Pain (morbid Rock mix)"	Shinji Orito	Irus	3:38
3.	"Eruptible (Freezer Remix)"	Shinji Orito	Freezer	4:17
4.	"Quaesitor (Shouya Namai Remix)"	Sōshi Hosoi	Shōya Namai	5:04
5.	"Sunbright (ALR Remix)" (サンブライト Sanburaito) (Lyrics by Ryukishi07; Performed by Ayaka Kitazawa)	Shinji Orito	Masayoshi Minoshima	5:37
6.	"Redemptor (Digital Universum ver)"	Sōshi Hosoi	Shoyu	4:24
7.	"Phobia (LU-I Remix)"	Sōshi Hosoi	LU-I	5:48
8.	"Finale (Kissing the Mirror Mix)"	Maiko Iuchi	Wooming, Kenkawa, Akira Natsuki	4:09
9.	"Retribution (Muzik Servant & Freezer Remix)"	Shinji Orito	Muzik Servant, Freezer	4:12
10.	"Fight for nowhere (Kissing the Mirror Mix)"	Shinji Orito	Wooming	3:51
11.	"Kari (Mizonokuchi Yūma remix)" (刈り Shear)	Maiko Iuchi	Yūma Mizonokuchi	4:01
Total length:				49:44

=== Pureness Rhapsody ===
Pureness Rhapsody (ピュアネスラプソディー) is an image song album for the Rewrite visual novel, and was first released on December 29, 2016 at Comiket 91 in Japan by Key Sounds Label bearing the catalog number KSLA-0128. The album is for the heroines Chihaya Ohtori and Lucia Konohana, and contains one disc with 14 tracks sung by Saya Shinomiya and Risa Asaki, the voice actresses who voiced Chihaya and Lucia, respectively. The album is composed, arranged, and produced by Shinji Orito, Tomohiro Takeshita, Maiko Iuchi and Shoyu.

Track listing
No.	Title	Lyrics	Music	Artist / Arrangement	Length
1.	"Princess is The Princess"	Ryukishi07	Tomohiro Takeshita	Saya Shinomiya, Risa Asaki / Tomohiro Takeshita	4:28
2.	"Fledglings girls!!"	Ryukishi07	Tomohiro Takeshita	Saya Shinomiya, Risa Asaki / Tomohiro Takeshita, Shoyu	4:45
3.	"Philosophyz"	Yūto Tonokawa	Shinji Orito	Saya Shinomiya, Risa Asaki / Shoyu	4:51
4.	"Sunbright" (サンブライト)	Ryukishi07	Shinji Orito	Risa Asaki / Shoyu	4:39
5.	"Koizakura Kaika Zensen" (恋桜開花前線)	Kai	Maiko Iuchi	Saya Shinomiya / Shoyu	4:22
6.	"Koi no Lucihaya Rolling" (恋のルチはや♡ローリング)	Ryukishi07	Shinji Orito	Saya Shinomiya, Risa Asaki / Shoyu	4:08
7.	"Princess is The Princess Lucia Solo ver." (Princess is The Princess ルチアソロ ver.)	Ryukishi07	Tomohiro Takeshita	Risa Asaki / Tomohiro Takeshita	4:28
8.	"Princess is The Princess Chihaya Solo ver." (Princess is The Princess ちはやソロ ver.)	Ryukishi07	Tomohiro Takeshita	Saya Shinomiya / Tomohiro Takeshita	4:28
9.	"Fledglings girls!! Lucia Solo ver." (Fledglings girls!! ルチアソロ ver.)	Ryukishi07	Tomohiro Takeshita	Risa Asaki / Tomohiro Takeshita, Shoyu	4:45
10.	"Fledglings girls!! Chihaya Solo ver." (Fledglings girls!! ちはやソロ ver.)	Ryukishi07	Tomohiro Takeshita	Saya Shinomiya / Tomohiro Takeshita, Shoyu	4:45
11.	"Philosophyz Lucia Solo ver." (Philosophyz ルチアソロ ver.)	Yūto Tonokawa	Shinji Orito	Risa Asaki / Shoyu	4:51
12.	"Philosophyz Chihaya Solo ver." (Philosophyz ちはやソロ ver.)	Yūto Tonokawa	Shinji Orito	Saya Shinomiya / Shoyu	4:51
13.	"Koi no Lucihaya Rolling Lucia Solo ver." (恋のルチはや♡ローリング ルチアソロ ver.)	Ryukishi07	Shinji Orito	Risa Asaki / Shoyu	4:08
14.	"Koi no Lucihaya Rolling Chihaya Solo ver." (恋のルチはや♡ローリング ちはやソロ ver.)	Ryukishi07	Shinji Orito	Saya Shinomiya / Shoyu	4:06
Total length:					63:35

=== Rewrite Original Soundtrack ===
Rewrite Original Soundtrack is a soundtrack containing music tracks featured in the Rewrite anime series by 8-Bit. It was released on June 28, 2017 in Japan by Key Sounds Label bearing the catalog numbers KSLA-0136–0139. The soundtrack contains four discs totaling 89 tracks, although only 14 are original to this soundtrack. The tracks were composed, arranged, and produced by Jun Maeda, Shinji Orito, Maiko Iuchi, Sōshi Hosoi, Ryō Mizutsuki, Anant-Garde Eyes, MintJam, Donmaru, Manyo, and Manack.

Disc 1
No.	Title	Music	Arrangement	Length
1.	"Philosophyz (TV animation ver.) (TV size)" (Lyrics by Yūto Tonokawa; Performed by Runa Mizutani)	Shinji Orito	MintJam
2.	"Hinagiku" (ヒナギク Daisy)	Maiko Iuchi	Maiko Iuchi
3.	"Shinsō Shinrin" (深層森林 Deep Forest)	Maiko Iuchi	Maiko Iuchi
4.	"Nirinsō" (ニリンソウ Soft Windflower)	Sōshi Hosoi	Sōshi Hosoi
5.	"Raised Bed"	Ryō Mizutsuki	Ryō Mizutsuki
6.	"Karai" (花蕾 Flower Bud)	Maiko Iuchi	Maiko Iuchi
7.	"Sunbright" (サンブライト Sanburaito)	Shinji Orito	MintJam
8.	"DIS is a Pain"	Shinji Orito	Shinji Orito
9.	"Irrigated Land"	Yūichirō Tsukagoshi	Yūichirō Tsukagoshi
10.	"Asagao" (アサガオ Morning Glory)	Maiko Iuchi	Maiko Iuchi
11.	"Carnation" (カーネーション Kānēshon)	Shinji Orito	Maiko Iuchi
12.	"Kajitsu" (果実 Fruit)	Ryō Mizutsuki	Ryō Mizutsuki
13.	"Fertilizer"	Shinji Orito	Maiko Iuchi
14.	"Genkyō" (幻境 Illusion Border)	Ryō Mizutsuki	Ryō Mizutsuki
15.	"Exploration"	Shinji Orito	Shinji Orito
16.	"Tōdo" (凍土 Frozen Soil)	Sōshi Hosoi	Sōshi Hosoi
17.	"Kuroboshibyō" (黒星病)	Sōshi Hosoi	Sōshi Hosoi
18.	"Scene of Carnage"	Maiko Iuchi	Maiko Iuchi
19.	"Radiance"	Sōshi Hosoi	Sōshi Hosoi
20.	"Watabōshi" (綿帽子 Bridal Headdress)	Sōshi Hosoi	Sōshi Hosoi
21.	"Anthurium" (アンスリウム Ansuriumu)	Ryō Mizutsuki	Ryō Mizutsuki
22.	"Lucia Chakushin'on" (ルチア着信音 Lucia's Ringtone)	Shinji Orito
23.	"Eruptible"	Shinji Orito	Shinji Orito
24.	"Kappanbyō" (褐斑病)	Maiko Iuchi	Maiko Iuchi
25.	"Sasayaka na Hajimari (TV animation ver.) (TV size)" (ささやかなはじまり) (Lyrics by NanosizeMir; Performed by Runa Mizutani)	Yūichirō Tsukagoshi	Yūichirō Tsukagoshi

Disc 2
No.	Title	Music	Arrangement	Length
1.	"Honesty"	Shinji Orito	Maiko Iuchi
2.	"Reply"	Shinji Orito	Ryō Mizutsuki
3.	"Sanka" (散花 Scattered Flowers)	Ryō Mizutsuki	Ryō Mizutsuki
4.	"Scene Shifts There"	Ryō Mizutsuki	Ryō Mizutsuki
5.	"Koibumi (TV size)" (恋文 Love Letter) (Lyrics by Yūto Tonokawa; Performed by Nagi Yanagi)	Shinji Orito	Manyo
6.	"Fight for nowhere"	Shinji Orito	Shinji Orito
7.	"Winners!"	Shinji Orito	Shinji Orito
8.	"Koshi" (枯死 Wither)	Sōshi Hosoi	Sōshi Hosoi
9.	"Potted One"	Maiko Iuchi	Maiko Iuchi
10.	"Sunbright (TV size)" (サンブライト Sanburaito) (Lyrics by Ryukishi07; Performed by Ayaka Kitazawa)	Shinji Orito	Shoyu
11.	"Sorrowless"	Shinji Orito	Maiko Iuchi
12.	"Toxoplasma"	Sōshi Hosoi	Sōshi Hosoi
13.	"End of the World (TV size)" (Lyrics by Jun Maeda; Performed by Anri Kumaki)	Jun Maeda	Manyo
14.	"Bloom"	Maiko Iuchi	Donmaru
15.	"Minori" (実り Ripen)	Ryō Mizutsuki	Ryō Mizutsuki
16.	"Moonbright" (ムーンブライト Mūnburaito)	Shinji Orito	Ryō Mizutsuki
17.	"Scene of Carnage Aggressiveness"	Maiko Iuchi	Maiko Iuchi
18.	"Kari" (刈り Shear)	Maiko Iuchi	Maiko Iuchi
19.	"Exploration2 Symphonic"	Shinji Orito	Manack
20.	"Sorrowless" (From Dye Mixture)	Shinji Orito	a2c, Terra
21.	"DIS is a Pain" (From Selene)	Shinji Orito	Irus
22.	"Kari" (刈り Shear) (From Dye Mixture)	Maiko Iuchi	a2c, Terra
23.	"Phobic"	Sōshi Hosoi	Sōshi Hosoi
24.	"Word of Dawn (TV size)" (Lyrics by Kai; Performed by Aoi Tada)	Tomohiro Takeshita

Disc 3
No.	Title	Music	Arrangement	Length
1.	"Tabi" (旅 Journey)	Jun Maeda	Anant-Garde Eyes
2.	"Daichi" (大地 Ground)	Sōshi Hosoi	Sōshi Hosoi
3.	"Nirinsō" (ニリンソウ Soft Windflower) (From Crann Mor)	Sōshi Hosoi	Hideki Higuchi
4.	"Yuriha" (揺葉)	Shinji Orito	Maiko Iuchi
5.	"Hōga" (萌芽 Sprout)	Shinji Orito	Shinji Orito, Manabu Miwa
6.	"Rewrite instrumental"	Yoffy	Kenichiro Ōishi
7.	"Itsuwaranai Kimi e (TV size)" (偽らない君へ To You Who Does Not Lie) (Lyrics by Ryukishi07; Performed by Nagi Yanagi)	Shinji Orito	Shōji Morifuji
8.	"Repress"	Yoffy	Shōji Morifuji
9.	"Horobi no Uta" (滅びの歌 Song of Destruction)	Jun Maeda, Shinji Orito
10.	"Finale"	Maiko Iuchi	Maiko Iuchi
11.	"Kari" (刈り Shear) (From Selene)	Maiko Iuchi	Yūma Mizonokuchi
12.	"Ai o Sosogu" (愛を灌ぐ Fill With Love)	Maiko Iuchi	Ryō Mizutsuki
13.	"Yume" (夢 Dream)	Jun Maeda	Ryō Mizutsuki
14.	"Philosophy of Yours"	Shinji Orito	Shinji Orito
15.	"Koiuta" (恋歌 Love Song) (Performed by Nagi Yanagi)	Shinji Orito	Manyo
16.	"Aogarebyō" (青枯病 Bacterial Wilt)	Ryō Mizutsuki	Ryō Mizutsuki
17.	"Hinagiku orgel Ver." (ヒナギク Daisy)	Maiko Iuchi	Donmaru
18.	"Hinagiku" (ヒナギク Daisy) (From Crann Mor)	Maiko Iuchi	Hideki Higuchi
19.	"Seitsui" (星墜 Shooting Star)	Tomohiro Takeshita	meeon
20.	"Daichi – Radiance" (大地 – Radiance Ground – Radiance)	Sōshi Hosoi	Hideki Sakamoto
21.	"Yami no Kanata e" (闇の彼方へ Beyond the Darkness) (Lyrics by Yūichirō Tsukagoshi; Performed by Runa Mizutani)	Yūichirō Tsukagoshi	Yūichirō Tsukagoshi

Disc 4
No.	Title	Music	Arrangement	Length
1.	"Innocence Eye" (Lyrics by Ryō Mizutsuki; Performed by Runa Mizutani)	Maiko Iuchi	Donmaru
2.	"Philosophy of Ours"	Shinji Orito	Manack
3.	"Species"	Maiko Iuchi	Ryō Mizutsuki
4.	"Phobia"	Sōshi Hosoi	Sōshi Hosoi
5.	"Rewrite (TV size)" (Lyrics by Yoffy; Performed by Psychic Lover)	Yoffy	Kenichiro Ōishi
6.	"Record"	Yoffy	Shōji Morifuji
7.	"Watari no Uta (TV size)" (渡りの詩 Ferry Poem) (Lyrics by Jun Maeda; Performed by Aoi Tada)	Jun Maeda	Anant-Garde Eyes
8.	"Last Desire (TV size)" (Lyrics by Kai; Performed by Maon Kurosaki)	Shinji Orito	Ryōsuke Shigenaga
9.	"Instincts (TV size)" (Lyrics by Kai; Performed by Runa Mizutani)	Donmaru	Yūichirō Tsukagoshi
10.	"Retribution"	Shinji Orito	Shinji Orito
11.	"Remembrance"	Shinji Orito	Manack
12.	"Scar"	Shinji Orito	Ryō Mizutsuki
13.	"Anemone" (アネモネ)	Shinji Orito	Shinji Orito
14.	"Liberation"	Yoffy	Shinji Orito
15.	"Sinner"	Shinji Orito	Ryō Mizutsuki
16.	"Sorrowless" (From Crann Mor)	Shinji Orito	Hideki Higuchi
17.	"In the Pocket"	Shinji Orito	Ryō Mizutsuki
18.	"Wedge"	Donmaru	Yūichirō Tsukagoshi
19.	"Canoe (TV size)" (Lyrics by Jun Maeda and Romeo Tanaka; Performed by Aoi Tada)	Jun Maeda	Anant-Garde Eyes

=== Re:Change ===
Re:Change is a remix album of songs taken from the Rewrite and Rewrite Harvest festa! visual novels, as well as the Rewrite anime series, and remixed into electronic dance music. It was released on August 9, 2017 for the VisualArt's summer 2017 event at the Gamers store in Akihabara, Japan by Key Sounds Label bearing the catalog number KSLA-0140. The album contains one disc with ten tracks originally composed by Jun Maeda, Shinji Orito, Maiko Iuchi, Yuichiro Tsukagoshi, Donmaru, Tomohiro Takeshita and Yoffy, and features 12 remix artists. Performers featured on the album include Anri Kumaki, Maon Kurosaki, Runa Mizutani, Psychic Lover and Aoi Tada.

Track listing
No.	Title	Lyrics	Music	Artist / Arrangement	Length
1.	"Philosophyz (Nizikawa Remix)"	Yūto Tonokawa	Shinji Orito	Runa Mizutani / Nizikawa	5:31
2.	"Yami no Kanata e (Shadowy DNB Remix)" (闇の彼方へ Beyond the Darkness)	Yūichirō Tsukagoshi	Yūichirō Tsukagoshi	Runa Mizutani / Irus	5:52
3.	"Rewrite (The Lasttrak Remix)"	Yoffy	Yoffy	Psychic Lover / The Lasttrak	5:47
4.	"Harvest (taqumi Remix)"	Yūto Tonokawa	Maiko Iuchi	Aoi Tada / taqumi	4:59
5.	"End of the World (LU-I Remix)"	Jun Maeda	Jun Maeda	Anri Kumaki / LU-I	6:31
6.	"Word of Dawn (Halozy SMJ Remix)"	Kai	Tomohiro Takeshita	Aoi Tada / sumijun	6:21
7.	"Okiraku Kyūsai (you Remix)" (おきらく☆きゅうさい)	Kai	Tomohiro Takeshita	Aoi Tada / you	5:44
8.	"Instincts (Yuma vs. Tracy Remix)"	Kai	Donmaru	Runa Mizutani / Yūma Mizonokuchi & Tracy	5:45
9.	"Ignis Memory (Muzik Servant vs Freezer Remix)"	Kai	Shinji Orito	Maon Kurosaki / Muzik Servant & Freezer	6:43
10.	"Last Desire (DJ Shimamura Remix)"	Kai	Shinji Orito	Maon Kurosaki / DJ Shimamura	5:09
Total length:					58:22

=== Forestia ===
Forestia is a remix album which contains a selection of songs from the visual novels Rewrite and Rewrite Harvest festa!. It was released on December 18, 2021 at Visual Arts Winter Fes in Japan by Key Sounds Label bearing the catalog number KSLA-0188. The album contains one disc with nine tracks originally composed by Jun Maeda, Shinji Orito, Maiko Iuchi, Sōshi Hosoi, Ryō Mizutsuki, Yūichirō Tsukagoshi and Tomohiro Takeshita, and features eight separate remix artists. Runa Mizutani sings "Philosophyz -■(memorial)-", "Sasayaka na Hajimari", and "White stars"; and Aoi Tada sings "Word of Dawn" and "Harvest".

Track listing
No.	Title	Music	Arrangement	Length
1.	"Philosophyz -■(memorial)-" (Lyrics by Yūto Tonokawa; Performed by Runa Mizutani)	Shinji Orito	Yūichirō Tsukagoshi	4:46
2.	"Word of Dawn" (Lyrics by Kai; Performed by Aoi Tada)	Tomohiro Takeshita	Meis Clauson	4:40
3.	"Shinsō Shinrin" (深層森林 Deep Forest)	Maiko Iuchi	Hideaki Kuroda	3:41
4.	"Sasayaka na Hajimari" (ささやかなはじまり Modest Beginning) (Lyrics by NanosizeMir; Performed by Runa Mizutani)	Yūichirō Tsukagoshi	Kidlit	6:02
5.	"Hinagiku" (ヒナギク Daisy)	Maiko Iuchi	a2c (MintJam)	4:32
6.	"Tabi" (旅 Journey)	Jun Maeda	Ryō Mizutsuki	5:46
7.	"Harvest" (Lyrics by Yūto Tonokawa; Performed by Aoi Tada)	Maiko Iuchi	Okka	4:12
8.	"Sanka" (散花 Scattered Flowers)	Ryō Mizutsuki	Shuhei Ōhashi	3:44
9.	"White stars" (Lyrics by Yūichirō Tsukagoshi; Performed by Runa Mizutani)	Sōshi Hosoi	Yūichirō Tsukagoshi	4:57
Total length:				42:20

== Singles ==
=== Philosophyz ===
"Philosophyz" is a single from the visual novel Rewrite containing the game's first opening theme and one of the ending themes, both sung by Runa Mizutani of the dōjin music group NanosizeMir. The single was first released on January 28, 2011 in Japan by Key Sounds Label bearing the catalog number KSLA-0067. The single contains six tracks including original, short, and instrumental versions of "Philosophyz" and "Yami no Kanata e". The single is composed, arranged, and produced by Shinji Orito, Yūto Tonokawa, MintJam and Yūichirō Tsukagoshi of NanosizeMir.

Track listing
No.	Title	Music	Arrangement	Length
1.	"Philosophyz" (Lyrics by Yūto Tonokawa; Performed by Runa Mizutani)	Shinji Orito	MintJam	4:52
2.	"Yami no Kanata e" (闇の彼方へ Beyond the Darkness) (Lyrics by Yūichirō Tsukagoshi; Performed by Runa Mizutani)	Yūichirō Tsukagoshi	Yūichirō Tsukagoshi	5:16
3.	"Philosophyz (Game size Ver.)" (Lyrics by Yūto Tonokawa; Performed by Runa Mizutani)	Shinji Orito	MintJam	2:58
4.	"Yami no Kanata e (Game size Ver.)" (闇の彼方へ Beyond the Darkness) (Lyrics by Yūichirō Tsukagoshi; Performed by Runa Mizutani)	Yūichirō Tsukagoshi	Yūichirō Tsukagoshi	3:27
5.	"Philosophyz (off vocal Ver.)"	Shinji Orito	MintJam	4:52
6.	"Yami no Kanata e (off vocal Ver.)" (闇の彼方へ Beyond the Darkness)	Yūichirō Tsukagoshi	Yūichirō Tsukagoshi	5:15
Total length:				26:40

=== Rewrite ===
"Rewrite" is a single by Psychic Lover released on May 27, 2011 in Japan by Key Sounds Label bearing the catalog number KSLA-0069. "Rewrite" was used as the second opening theme song to the visual novel Rewrite. The single contains four tracks including original, short, off vocal and instrumental versions of "Rewrite".

All tracks are written by Yoffy and arranged by Kenichiro Ōishi.

Track listing
No.	Title	Length
1.	"Rewrite"	3:55
2.	"Rewrite (Game size Ver.)"	1:33
3.	"Rewrite (off vocal Ver.)"	3:55
4.	"Rewrite (Instrumental Ver.)"	3:53
Total length:		13:16

=== Philosophyz / Sasayaka na Hajimari ===
"Philosophyz / Sasayaka na Hajimari" (ささやかなはじまり) is a single for the Rewrite anime series by 8-Bit, which was released on July 27, 2016 in Japan by Key Sounds Label bearing the catalog number KSLA-0118. The single contains the opening and ending themes from the anime version in full length, TV length, and instrumental versions. The opening theme is "Philosophyz" and the ending theme is "Sasayaka na Hajimari", both sung by Runa Mizutani of NanosizeMir. Both songs are remixes of the theme songs featured in the Rewrite and Rewrite Harvest festa! visual novels. The single is composed and produced by Shinji Orito and Yūichirō Tsukagoshi.

Track listing
No.	Title	Music	Arrangement	Length
1.	"Philosophyz (TV animation ver.)" (Lyrics by Yūto Tonokawa; Performed by Runa Mizutani)	Shinji Orito	MintJam	4:55
2.	"Sasayaka na Hajimari (TV animation ver.)" (ささやかなはじまり) (Lyrics by NanosizeMir; Performed by Runa Mizutani)	Yūichirō Tsukagoshi	Yūichirō Tsukagoshi	5:53
3.	"Philosophyz (TV animation ver.) (TV Size)" (Lyrics by Yūto Tonokawa; Performed by Runa Mizutani)	Shinji Orito	MintJam	1:39
4.	"Sasayaka na Hajimari (TV animation ver.) (TV Size)" (ささやかなはじまり) (Lyrics by NanosizeMir; Performed by Runa Mizutani)	Yūichirō Tsukagoshi	Yūichirō Tsukagoshi	1:31
5.	"Philosophyz (TV animation ver.) (Instrumental)"	Shinji Orito	MintJam	4:53
6.	"Sasayaka na Hajimari (TV animation ver.) (Instrumental)" (ささやかなはじまり)	Yūichirō Tsukagoshi	Yūichirō Tsukagoshi	5:52
Total length:				24:43

=== End of the World / Hetakuso na Uta ===
"End of the World / Hetakuso na Uta" (へたくそな唄) is a single by Anri Kumaki for the Rewrite anime series by 8-Bit, which was released on September 21, 2016 in Japan by Key Sounds Label bearing the catalog number KSLA-0120.

All tracks are written by Jun Maeda and arranged by Manyo.

Track listing
No.	Title	Length
1.	"End of the World"	5:15
2.	"Hetakuso na Uta" (へたくそな唄)	6:27
3.	"End of the World (TV size)"	1:34
4.	"End of the World (Instrumental)"	5:13
5.	"Hetakuso na Uta (Instrumental)" (へたくそな唄)	6:29
Total length:		24:58

=== Word of Dawn / Okiraku Kyūsai ===
"Word of Dawn / Okiraku Kyūsai" (おきらく☆きゅうさい) is a single by Aoi Tada for the Rewrite anime series by 8-Bit, which was released on September 21, 2016 in Japan by Key Sounds Label bearing the catalog number KSLA-0121.

All lyrics are written by Kai; all music is composed by Tomohiro Takeshita.

Track listing
No.	Title	Length
1.	"Word of Dawn"	4:44
2.	"Okiraku Kyūsai" (おきらく☆きゅうさい)	4:25
3.	"Word of Dawn (TV size)"	1:35
4.	"Word of Dawn (Instrumental)"	4:45
5.	"Okiraku Kyūsai (Instrumental)" (おきらく☆きゅうさい)	4:27
Total length:		19:56

=== Last Desire ===
"Last Desire" is a single by Maon Kurosaki for the Rewrite anime series by 8-Bit, which was released on March 22, 2017 in Japan by Key Sounds Label bearing the catalog number KSLA-0129.

All lyrics are written by Kai; all music is composed by Shinji Orito and arranged by Ryōsuke Shigenaga.

Track listing
No.	Title	Length
1.	"Last Desire"	4:10
2.	"Ignis Memory"	4:56
3.	"Last Desire (TV size)"	1:35
4.	"Last Desire (Instrumental)"	4:10
5.	"Ignis Memory (Instrumental)"	4:54
Total length:		19:45

=== Instincts ===
"Instincts" is a single by Runa Mizutani or the Rewrite anime series by 8-Bit, which was released on March 22, 2017 in Japan by Key Sounds Label bearing the catalog number KSLA-0130.

All lyrics are written by Kai; all music is composed by Donmaru and arranged by Yūichirō Tsukagoshi.

Track listing
No.	Title	Length
1.	"Instincts"	5:24
2.	"Cradles Tale"	5:44
3.	"Instincts (TV size)"	1:37
4.	"Instincts (Instrumental)"	5:24
5.	"Cradles Tale (Instrumental)"	5:42
Total length:		23:51

== Chart positions ==
Albums	Release date	Label	Format	Peak Oricon chart positions
Rewrite Original Soundtrack	August 12, 2011	Key Sounds Label (KSLA-0073–0075)	CD	96
"Philosophyz / Sasayaka na Hajimari"	July 27, 2016	Key Sounds Label (KSLA-0118)	CD	37
"End of the World / Hetakuso na Uta"	September 21, 2016	Key Sounds Label (KSLA-0120)	CD	23
"Word of Dawn / Okiraku Kyūsai"	September 21, 2016	Key Sounds Label (KSLA-0121)	CD	29
"Last Desire"	March 22, 2017	Key Sounds Label (KSLA-0129)	CD	29
"Instincts"	March 22, 2017	Key Sounds Label (KSLA-0130)	CD	46
Rewrite Original Soundtrack	June 28, 2017	Key Sounds Label (KSLA-0136–0139)	CD	252
