= List of Charlotte episodes =

Cover art of the first BD compilation volume released by Aniplex of America, featuring main character Nao Tomori

Charlotte is a Japanese anime television series produced by P.A. Works, and the second original anime series created by the visual novel studio Key following Angel Beats! in 2010. The series was created and written by Jun Maeda, and directed by Yoshiyuki Asai, with music by Maeda, Hikarishuyo, and the group Anant-Garde Eyes. The characters were designed by Kanami Sekiguchi based on Na-Ga's original concepts. The story takes place in an alternate reality where a small percentage of children manifest superhuman abilities upon reaching puberty. The series focused on Yuu Otosaka, a high school boy who awakens the ability to temporarily possess others, which brings him to the attention of Nao Tomori, the student council president of a school founded as a haven for children with such abilities.

The 13-episode anime aired in Japan between July 4 and September 26, 2015, on the BS11, GTV, GYT, and Tokyo MX television networks. It was simulcast by Aniplex Channel, Crunchyroll, Hulu, Daisuki, Viewster, Animax Asia, AnimeLab, and All 4. The series was released on seven Blu-ray/DVD volumes between September 23, 2015, and March 30, 2016, in Japan, with an original video animation episode included on the seventh volume. The series is licensed in North America by Aniplex of America, who released the series on two Blu-ray compilation volumes on August 16, 2016, and November 15, 2016. The series is also licensed in Australia by Madman Entertainment.

The opening theme is "Bravely You" by Lia and the ending theme is "Yakeochinai Tsubasa" (灼け落ちない翼; "The Wings that Won't Be Burned Down") by Aoi Tada. "Rakuen Made" (楽園まで; "To Paradise") by How-Low-Hello is used as the ending theme of episodes 3 and 4, and "Kimi no Moji" (君の文字; "Your Character") by Anri Kumaki is used as the ending theme of episode 13. Several insert theme songs by two in-story bands are also used, featuring songs sung by Maaya Uchida for the band How-Low-Hello and songs sung by Marina for the band Zhiend. For How-Low-Hello, these include: "Keep on Burnin'" (episode 1), "Singer Days" (シンガーデイズ, Shingā Deizu) (episode 3), "Real" (episode 4 and 6) and "Hatsunetsu Days" (発熱デイズ, Hatsunetsu Deizu; "Feverish Days") (episode 8). For Zhiend, these include: "Live for You" (episode 2), "Clouded Sky" (episode two and five), "Fallin'" (episodes 5, 8, and 11), "Heavy Rain" (episode 8), "Blood Colour", "Scar on Face", "Adore", and "Trigger" (episode 9); and "Sinking Ships" (episode 13).

== Episode list ==
No.	Title	Directed by	Original air date
1	"I Think About Others"; Transliteration: "Ware Tanin o Omou" (Japanese: 我他人を思う)	Yoshiyuki Asai	July 5, 2015
Yuu Otosaka, a boy with the ability to temporarily possess anyone in his line of sight for five seconds, abuses his power by looking at other students' answers during exams. He manages to enter the prestigious Hinomori High School, where he once again uses his ability to woo the popular Yumi Shirayanagi. Yuu's perfect scores catch the attention of student council president Yoshiyuki Ōmura, who challenges him to retake the exam on his own or to face expulsion on grounds of cheating. This turns out to be a trap set up by a girl named Nao Tomori, who has been observing his abilities in action. Yuu attempts to flee but is caught by Jōjirō Takajō, who can move at uncontrollably high speeds, after which Nao, who can make herself invisible to a specific target, beats up Yuu. Nao arranges for him and his little sister Ayumi Otosaka to be transferred to Hoshinoumi Academy, a school for those with abilities like him. Getting dumped by Yumi as a result of the restrictions forced upon him, Yuu reluctantly prepares for his new life as a member of Hoshinoumi Academy's student council.
2	"Melody of Despair"; Transliteration: "Zetsubō no Senritsu" (Japanese: 絶望の旋律)	Tomoaki Ōta	July 12, 2015
Yuu is tasked as a member of the student council to ensure the safety of students with special abilities. During lunch, Jōjirō seemingly gets hurt after demonstrating his developing teleportation skills to Yuu in the cafeteria to grab some sandwiches. He tells Yuu that Nao has no female friends due to her selective invisibility power. A boy named Takehito Kumagami, who can detect people with abilities, guides Yuu, Nao, and Jōjirō to Nanba High School. The three of them catch a student named Udō, who uses his thoughtography ability to produce X-ray photos of girls in their underwear, selling them for a profit to support his ill parents. After they threaten him, Udō agrees to stop using his ability. The next day, Nao takes Yuu to see her big brother, Kazuki Tomori, a musician who was experimented on for his ability to manipulate sound waves and has been left unstable and insane ever since then. Nao explains that thanks to a particular person she trusts, she was able to escape from the school that experimented on her brother and to bring him to a healthier environment.
3	"Love and Flame"; Transliteration: "Koi to Honō" (Japanese: 恋と炎)	Mitsutaka Noshitani	July 19, 2015
Yuu eats lunch at the cafeteria again with Jōjirō, who risks injury by using his teleportation ability to get the best beef curry for the both of them. In their mission to find a user supposedly with two abilities, Yuu, Nao, and Jōjirō encounter popular singing idol and vocalist of the band How-Low-Hello, Yusa Nishimori, who is being chased. With the help of her friend Shō, the three fight off her pursuer, finding out afterward that Yusa is a medium, frequently being possessed by her deceased elder sister Misa Kurobane, who has pyrokinesis. Yusa explains that she was pursued having accidentally brought home a television producer's phone, which holds shady facts against him. Nao devises a threatening plan to deal with the television producer. That night, Misa, in the guise of Yusa, confronts the television producer. With help from the others, she convinces the television producer to leave Yusa alone and returns the phone to him. Afterward, Nao arranges for Yusa to transfer to Hoshinoumi Academy, while Shō confesses his feelings for Misa, who advises him to live his own life and thanks to him for everything.
4	"Moment of Earnest"; Transliteration: "Setsuna no Honki" (Japanese: 刹那の本気)	Ken'ichi Imaizumi	July 26, 2015
Following Yusa's conspicuous transfer to Yuu's class, Nao brings her and the boys to their third task in Kannai Academy, where a student is believed to have telekinesis. Nao shows them footage of a baseball pitcher, Arifumi Fukuyama, who pitches knuckleballs with his ability instead of his grip. They confront Arifumi, who refuses to stop using his ability. Nao organizes a baseball match between the two academies' baseball teams, with the condition that Arifumi will stop using his ability if Hoshinoumi Academy wins. After eight innings, both teams are evenly scored. In the ninth inning, Yuu hits a few foul balls, and Misa runs from second base to home plate. Hoshinoumi subsequently wins against Kannai, two to one. Arifumi admits to using his ability only to help Takato, who is the catcher and his best friend, train to qualify for the national league. The others assure that Arifumi can still be of much help to Takato, and Arifumi agrees to stop using his ability.
5	"Sound Heard Sometime in the Past"; Transliteration: "Itsuka Kiita Oto" (Japanese: いつか聴いた音)	Tomoaki Ōta	August 2, 2015
Learning of a user capable of flight, the student council camps out in the mountains, where the user has been training to master his ability. During the first two nights, Yusa tells the other members about her close relationship with Misa, while Nao tells Yuu about her dream of filming her favorite band named Zhiend. Jōjirō later tells Yuu that their abilities will only last for two more years. The day after, the student council is confronted by Saitō, the ability user, who threatens them into leaving, but Nao dismisses his threat as a bluff. Saitō then steals Nao's camcorder from her and attempts to escape by flying away. However, Saitō is thwarted by Yuu, and Nao convinces Saitō to stop using his ability. In the evening, Yuu returns home to find Ayumi sick with a cold while eating dinner.
6	"Happiness Never Noticed"; Transliteration: "Kizukanakatta Shiawase" (Japanese: 気づかなかった幸せ)	Fumihiko Suganuma	August 9, 2015
While Ayumi stays at home to recover, the student council learns of a student with a collapse ability in the condo complex, and Nao suspects that Ayumi has developed said ability, as only a sick student would be home from school at that time of day. Ayumi is visited by Yuu, Nao, and Yusa for dinner and is tucked into bed at night. After Yuu learns that Ayumi dreamed about the ground suddenly cracking, a worried Nao instructs Yuu to tell Ayumi to stay home one more day. Although her temperature has gone down, Ayumi sneaks out and goes to school. In the corridor, after Nomura prevents Oikawa from talking to Ayumi, Konishi threatens Ayumi with a box cutter, accusing Ayumi of supposedly stealing Oikawa from her. Backed into a corner, Ayumi activates her ability, causing the school wing to disintegrate around her. As Yuu desperately searches through the wreckage for any sign of his sister, he is knocked unconscious by a piece of falling rubble.
7	"Beyond the Escape"; Transliteration: "Tōhikō no Hate ni" (Japanese: 逃避行の果てに)	Toshiya Shinohara	August 16, 2015
Yuu wakes up in a hospital and learns that Ayumi died in the school collapse. He becomes a recluse into despondency, showing no interest when Jōjirō and Yusa come to visit. Yumi also comes by and expresses her concern, but he refuses her help. When government agents show up at his apartment, Yuu goes on the run and hides out in a manga café, later using his powers to pick fights with gangs and growing more unstable over time. Before he can turn his attention to drugs, he is stopped by Nao, who has been secretly observing him the entire time. Nao convinces Yuu to eat a proper meal as a bet, serving him a plate of omurice, which Ayumi had been trying to perfect using his mother's recipe. Yuu acknowledges that he has lost the bet and resolves to return to the student council with Nao to work hard in memory of his sister.
8	"A Chance Meeting"; Transliteration: "Kaikō" (Japanese: 邂逅)	Mitsutaka Noshitani	August 23, 2015
After Yuu is welcomed back at school by Jōjirō and Yusa, the student council assembles to watch Yusa's new music video. Nao invites Yuu to accompany her to a Zhiend concert since Jōjirō and Yusa are not interested. Later that day, Yuu comes across Sala Shane, Zhiend's blind vocalist, who treats him to okonomiyaki at a restaurant. After she helps Yuu burn incense on the altar to pay respect for the loss of Ayumi, Sala later reveals that she overcame her blindness to get to where she is now. Yuu takes Sala to see Kazuki in the hospital, where she sings one of her inspirational songs to calm Kazuki from his rage. After seeing Sala off, Nao thanks Yuu for helping to improve Kazuki's condition, and Yuu wonders why he feels so nostalgic over Zhiend's music.
9	"A World That Does Not Exist Here"; Transliteration: "Koko ni Nai Sekai" (Japanese: ここにない世界)	Tomoaki Ōta	August 30, 2015
At the Zhiend concert with Nao, Yuu feels a familiar sensation upon hearing what is supposed to be a brand-new song. He experiences an aberrant memory, in which he and Ayumi lived in a research institution in another parallel timeline where they were monitored for their abilities. When Ayumi's collapse ability caused damage to the structure, a nonconformist scientist named Tsutsumiuchi helped Yuu escape and urged him to use his true ability to plunder other people's powers. Yuu eventually reached his brother, Shunsuke Otosaka, who possesses the ability to time travel. Back in the present, Yuu regains consciousness, now aware of the fact that he has a brother. Yuu and Nao are then approached by Kumagami, who takes them to a secret underground haven to meet with Shunsuke.
10	"Plunder"; Transliteration: "Ryakudatsu" (Japanese: 略奪)	Tōru Yoshida	September 6, 2015
In the past, Shunsuke and Kumagami, as well as their allied ability users Medoki, Shichino, and Maedomari tried to find a way to keep ability users safe from researchers with impure intentions. As Shunsuke time-leaped multiple times to find a solution, his vision grew weaker with each leap. After one final leap which left him blind, Shunsuke used his idea of establishing a safe haven to buy an educational facility to serve as a school (i.e. Hoshinoumi Academy). Wanting to keep them safe, Shunsuke arranged for Yuu and Ayumi to be hypnotized by Medoki, and have their memories of him be erased by Maedomari. In the present, Shunsuke instructs Yuu to plunder his time leap ability and to return to the day before Ayumi died. Yuu promptly plunders Ayumi's collapse ability, keeping her from accidentally using it. Later on, Yuu and Nao use their powers to scare off Konishi so that she cannot harm Ayumi. With Ayumi finally safe, Kumagami takes her and Yuu to Shunsuke.
11	"Charlotte"; Transliteration: "Shārotto" (Japanese: シャーロット)	Fumihiko Suganuma	September 13, 2015
Shunsuke urges Yuu to stay with Ayumi at the safe haven until his abilities disappear. In the research facility, Tsutsumiuchi explains that people possess their special abilities as a result of inhaling particles spread by a short-period comet called Charlotte, which passes Earth every 75 years. A vaccine is being prepared before the next pass of the comet. Shunsuke's aide, Furuki, is threatened into handing Kumagami over to a group of foreign terrorists in a factory. The terrorists torture Kumagami to inquire information about ability users, allowing the terrorists to hold Nao and Kumagami hostage in exchange for Yuu. Upon ensuring the safety of Furuki's family, Yuu goes to the factory to ransom Nao and Kumagumi but is attacked by a female ability user who slashes his right eye, preventing him from time-leaping. Yuu activates his collapse ability, disintegrating the factory on top of them all. Although Yuu manages to use telekinesis to protect himself and the female ability user, Kumagami is impaled by a metal pipe as he shields Nao from the wreckage.
12	"Promise"; Transliteration: "Yakusoku" (Japanese: 約束)	Toshiya Shinohara	September 20, 2015
Yuu wakes up in the hospital with Medoki, Shichino, and Maedomari at his bedside. He learns of the permanent loss of his right eye and the devastating death of Kumagumi. Ayumi, Jōjirō, and Yusa each visit during Yuu's rehabilitation. Also, Yuu encourages Misa to express appreciation for her parents while she still has a chance, being given this opportunity when Yusa hosts a television food report on their family restaurant. After Shunsuke explains that Japan will be involved in terrorist attacks soon, Nao suggests for Yuu to travel overseas to plunder the powers of all ability users worldwide, though this could risk his sanity. He accepts this challenge and confesses his love to her, and they make a promise that he will come home safely. She offers him to plunder her ability so she can live a normal life. He then plunders the abilities of Jōjirō, Yusa, and Misa, the latter of whom leaves behind a letter for Yusa expressing how much fun she had with them all. Nao gives some foreign language flashcards to Yuu, and he gives back her MP3 player as a vow that he will come back to her once the mission is over.
13	"Memories to Come"; Transliteration: "Korekara no Kiroku" (Japanese: これからの記録)	Yoshiyuki Asai	September 27, 2015
Beginning his journey in the Philippines, Yuu plunders an ability for seeking out other users and slowly starts taking the abilities from each user he meets, earning him a reputation as the dreaded "One-Eyed Grim Reaper". At a paramilitary facility that exploits adolescent ability users, he gains an ability to detect those with dormant abilities, using an illness-worsening ability to accelerate the abilities' development in order to plunder them. As he travels to various countries, he begins to suffer from extreme stress and borderline insanity from acquiring so much power, yet seeing Nao's flashcards prevents him from going haywire. Upon discovering the last active ability user in China, Yuu is critically injured from an attack by a male bounty hunter, but Yuu defends the young female ability user of courage before being recovered by Shunsuke. An amnesiac Yuu wakes up in the hospital back in Japan with Nao at his bedside. Nao informs him that they are lovers and expresses gratitude that he has kept the flashcards and their promise after all this time. With no other ability users present in the world, Yuu, Nao, Jōjirō, Yusa, and Ayumi look forward to the memories they will make from now on.
OVA	"The Strong Ones"; Transliteration: "Tsuyoi Monotachi" (Japanese: 強い者たち)	Yoshiyuki Asai; Daisuke Tsukushi	March 30, 2016
This episode is set between episodes 4 and 5. The student council discovers Iori Sekiguchi, a girl with mind reading, which causes the thoughts of people around her to be projected to others. Realizing that Iori feels burdened over causing those around her to fight, Yuu and Nao, despite having their thoughts constantly being read aloud to each other, treat Iori to a pleasant day at an amusement park to prove they can get along with each other. Iori loses confidence after her power causes a couple to argue, but Nao remains determined to stay by her side and learns what might have triggered Iori's ability. She and Yuu visit Iori's friend, Honoka, who informs them of Iori's incurable disease, which will eventually take away Iori's ability to move. Honoka's selfish desire to isolate herself from her best friend's suffering agitates Nao, who lashes out at Honoka. Afterward, Honoka makes up with Iori, who resolves to do her best to survive her disease.
