= MintJam =

Japanese rock band

MintJam is a Japanese hard rock band formed in Tokyo in 2003. They began to create instrumental music for video game covers, and went on to creating their own original instrumental and vocal music. These days they are more heavily focused as a vocal group with a modern rock sound. They have released several full-length albums, as well as many Maxi Singles. In 2023 they celebrated their 20th anniversary with the new album 'Interlude'. They also occasionally play live. Current members include vocalist TERRA and guitarist a2c. Previous members feature guitarist, setzer (who left in 2009) and keyboardist, kya (who left in 2006).

== History ==
MintJam was formed in 2003 by setzer (guitars), and a2c (guitars) as an amateur band in the Japanese indie music community MUZIE. Keyboardist Kya (キャ) joined later that year when MintJam began to achieve wider recognition. In 2006, Kya officially left MintJam after the release of their fifth album Energy Drive. Vocalist TERRA joined MintJam in 2005. Besides vocal works composed by TERRA, MintJam is known for instrumental compositions as both a2c and setzer are both composers and arrangers. In 2012, setzer left MintJam and officially became a supporting member, choosing to focus on his work with his circle Polo Rockers.

MintJam has been an active participant in Japanese coterie performances. They have composed soundtracks and musical scores/background music for Japanese anime and games. They also mixed and published albums on the internet which a select are available on iTunes globally.

MintJam began their performance career with the release of their single album Judgment Day in September 2009. In August 2010, MintJam collaborated with Japanese female singer RITA. The nominal title "MintJam with RITA" allowed MintJam to take part in the Japanese show "ちょっかな".

They released a 20th anniversary album – "Interlude" on October 29, 2023, which featured a mixture of brand new tracks, including a new song featuring original returning members kya and setzer for the track "Never Mind". It also features a '20th Anniversary Edition' of the song "Keep On Jammin'".

== Band members ==
Current Members

- a2c (guitars, drum programming) 2003–present
- TERRA (Vocals) 2005–present

Former Members

- setzer – (Guitars) – 2003–2009
- A.koga（エーコガ）– (Composition) 2004–2005
- Kya（キャ）– (keyboards) – 2003–2006
Guitarist – setzer

Vocalist – TERRA

== Albums ==
Album	Releaser	Date
BRINY AIR	POTENEKO ACADEMY ORIGINAL SOUND TRACKS	August 17, 2003
MISTRAL NOTE	POTENEKO ACADEMY ORIGINAL SOUND TRACKS 2	December 30, 2003
Ragnarok Online Arrange CD	MintJam / GRAVITY	March 3, 2004
1st GIG #Awake		August 15, 2004
2nd GIG #Break Out		Nov 10, 2004
ATMOSPHERE	POTENEKO ACADEMY ORIGINAL SOUND TRACKS 1&2	December 30, 2004
		April 24, 2005
3rd GIG #Crescent		August 14, 2005
4th GIG #Decide		December 30, 2005
Passing by / SWAY (风叶×MintJam)		April 29, 2006
5th GIG #Energy Drive		August 13, 2006
extra GIG #Crying Moon		October 9, 2006
Reincarnation		June 30, 2007
Little Busters! Arrange Album "Rockstar Busters!"		December 29, 2007
R(MintJam×ViViX)		December 21, 2007
chronograph		August 16, 2008
JUDGEMENT DAY		September 3, 2008
Million KNights Vermilion -Original Soundtrack		December 29, 2008
KEY tribute album	Vivid Colors	May 5, 2009
Prometheus		October 11, 2009
Beyond the Eternity (Rita×MintJam)		May 5, 2010
Identity		December q11, 2010
Philosophyz / 闇の彼方へ (MintJam Version)		December 29, 2011
Accel World Original Soundtrack feat. MintJam		September 26, 2012
Rewrite & Rewrite Harvest festa! Arrange Album "dye mixture"		December 29, 2012
Try to be Brave / Weed Spirit		April 29, 2013
Little Monster		August 12, 2013
Back-Alley Spiders		March 19, 2014
Keep on Jamming		October 12, 2014
Hysteria		April 26, 2015
Guilty		October 25, 2015
Made-up Mind		October 25, 2016
Light Me Up		October 30, 2016
Blue Lightning		April 30, 2017
ONE		October 29, 2017
Eclipse		June 30, 2018
Now Or Never		April 23, 2023
Interlude (20th Anniversary Album)		October 29, 2023
