= Rewrite (video game) =

2011 Japanese visual novel developed by Key

- Cover art featuring heroines (from left to right) Kotori Kanbe, Chihaya Ohtori, Lucia Konohana, Kagari, Sizuru Nakatsu and Akane Senri
- Developer: Key
- Publishers: Visual Arts (Windows); Prototype (PSP, PS Vita, PS3, PS4); WW: Sekai Project
- Artist: Itaru Hinoue
- Writers: Romeo Tanaka; Yūto Tonokawa; Ryukishi07
- Composers: Jun Maeda; Shinji Orito; Maiko Iuchi; Sōshi Hosoi; Ryō Mizutsuki
- Platforms: Microsoft Windows, PlayStation Portable, PlayStation Vita, PlayStation 3, PlayStation 4
- Release: Rewrite June 24, 2011: Windows; JP: June 24, 2011; JP: July 29, 2016; WW: December 17, 2021 PlayStation Portable; JP: April 17, 2014 PlayStation Vita; JP: August 28, 2014 PlayStation 3; JP: February 11, 2015 PlayStation 4; JP: March 23, 2017; Rewrite Harvest festa! July 27, 2012: Windows; JP: July 27, 2012; WW: July 14, 2025 PlayStation Vita; JP: May 18, 2017
- Genre: Visual novel
- Mode: Single-player

Rewrite is a Japanese visual novel developed by Key, a brand of Visual Arts. It was released on June 24, 2011, for Windows PCs and is rated for all ages. Rewrite is Key's ninth game, following other titles such as Kanon, Air, and Clannad. Key released a fan disc expanding on the game's story titled Rewrite Harvest festa! on July 27, 2012, for Windows. Rewrite was ported to the PlayStation Portable, PlayStation Vita, PlayStation 3 and PlayStation 4, while Harvest festa! was ported to the PlayStation Vita. An English version of Rewrite for Windows was released by Sekai Project in 2021; they will also release Harvest festa! in English. The story follows the life of Kotarou Tennouji, a high school student with superhuman abilities who investigates supernatural mysteries with five girls from his school in the fictional city of Kazamatsuri. This ultimately leads him into the middle of a conflict between familiar summoners and superhumans with the fate of the world at stake.

The gameplay in Rewrite follows an interactive branching plot line with multiple scenarios, and focuses on the player character gaining the favor of the six female main characters. There are additional minigames and quests added into the gameplay, which are necessary to complete the game. The game ranked as the best-selling PC game sold in Japan for the time of its release, and charted in the national top 50 twice more afterwards. There have been five manga adaptations based on Rewrite published by ASCII Media Works and Ichijinsha. Comic anthologies, light novels and an art book were also published, as were several music albums. A 24-episode anime television series adaptation, produced by Eight Bit and directed by Motoki Tanaka, aired between July 2016 and March 2017.

== Gameplay ==
Text in Rewrite is displayed in a dialog box, here depicting the player character talking with Kotori.

Rewrite is a romance visual novel in which the player assumes the role of Kotarou Tennouji. Much of its gameplay is spent on reading the story's narrative and dialogue. The text in the game is accompanied by character sprites, which represent who Kotarou is talking to, over background art. Throughout the game, the player encounters CG artwork at certain points in the story, which take the place of the background art and character sprites. When the game is completed at least once, a gallery of the viewed CGs and played background music becomes available on the game's title screen. Rewrite follows a branching plot line with multiple endings, and depending on the decisions that the player makes during the game, the plot will progress in a specific direction.

There are eight main plot lines that the player will have the chance to experience, three which are initially available and five more which can later become available. Throughout gameplay, the player is given multiple options to choose from, and text progression pauses at these points until a choice is made. Some decisions can lead the game to end prematurely, which offer an alternative ending to the plot. To view all plot lines in their entirety, the player will have to replay the game multiple times and choose different choices to further the plot to an alternate direction. When first playing the game, the scenarios for the heroines Kotori, Chihaya and Lucia are available. To access Sizuru's scenario, Kotori's must be completed first. Similarly, to access Akane's scenario, Chihaya's must be done first. After the plot lines for these five heroines have been completed, an additional scenario called Moon is made available. Upon the completion of the Moon route, another scenario called Terra is made available, which serves as the true conclusion to the story; both Moon and Terra revolve around the heroine, Kagari.

Throughout gameplay, the player encounters minigames accessed through an in-game GPS system called Mappie, which is rendered as a point and click map. In most cases, the player can choose to automatically skip accessing Mappie, but sometimes the player is required to play through the minigame to move on to the next event. When accessing Mappie, the player meets various people who become Kotarou's friends, and certain people and items encountered will lead the player to do a quest. The names of the friends and the completed quests are recorded in the Memory function, which serves as an encyclopedia of events. If the player completes all 31 quests, a bonus scenario called Oppai (おっぱい, Breasts) is made available. Oppai is a branch off Akane's scenario and serves as a comedic plot line not important to the overall story.

The gear and dial in the bottom left of the game screen is related to the Kotarou's Rewrite ability. The dial moves forward whenever this ability is used, and the outcome of certain scenes is determined by how much the dial has moved. Throughout most of the game, the text is presented in a dialog box on the lower portion of the game screen, but this is changed for the Terra scenario, where the text is overlaid across the entire screen.

In Rewrite Harvest festa!, there are six separate scenarios, one for each heroine. The player is initially given the choice to play the scenarios for Kotori, Chihaya and Lucia from a character selection screen. Once these three scenarios are completed, the routes for Sizuru and Akane become available, and after those two are completed, Kagari's scenario is made available. After the completion of Kagari's scenario, a dungeon exploration role-playing minigame called Rewrite Quest becomes available.

== Plot ==
=== Setting ===
The main part of Rewrite's story takes place in the fictional city of Kazamatsuri, Japan, where treeplanting and afforestation have caused the city to become overgrown with trees and vegetation. The protagonist Kotarou Tennouji and his friends in the occult research society attend a high school in Kazamatsuri, in addition to spending time together in the society's clubroom. Outside of the school, frequented locations include the forest around Kazamatsuri and Kotarou's house. Throughout the story, Kotarou encounters an alternate dimension of Kazamatsuri where everything is silent and the sky is gray. There are many entrances to this dimension, a secret world developed by the organisation Gaia, throughout the city. There, a sustainable environment exists to support life. When on the Moon, a hill where daisies grow is prominently shown amid a ruined Kazamatsuri where the night is eternal. This hill appears again later on Earth in the forest of Kazamatsuri.

Kazamatsuri is the setting for a secret war being waged by two main groups: Gaia and Guardian. Gaia, an organization under the auspices of the environmental conservation group Martel, is populated by nihilistic and misanthropic people able to contract with familiars, which manifest as constructs fueled by the summoner's life force. Martel itself used to be a church and contains within it a holy maiden group of girls with developmental disabilities trained to be choral singers of a song of destruction, aiming to drive out and force the Earth's collapse. Guardian is dedicated to the destruction of familiars and is composed almost entirely of humans who possess special powers. Gaia and Guardian came to Kazamatsuri in the pursuit of the Earth's familiar named Kagari, who manifests as a young, high school age-looking girl. Kagari, the heroine of Rewrite, has the power to initiate a period of re-evolution, which restarts the process of evolving another means of intelligent life. However, this is done with the use of the Earth's energy, and by the time the events of Rewrite occur, there is no more energy left to do another re-evolution. Gaia wants to capture Kagari to ensure the destruction of humanity, but Guardian wishes to seek out Kagari to kill her, ensuring that human life continues.

=== Principal characters ===
Cast
Role	Voice actor
Kotarou Tennouji (Note: Tennōji Kotarō (天王寺 瑚太朗))	Masakazu Morita
Kotori Kanbe (Note: Kanbe Kotori (神戸 小鳥))	Chiwa Saitō
Chihaya Ohtori (Note: Ōtori Chihaya (鳳 ちはや))	Saya Shinomiya
Akane Senri (Note: Senri Akane (千里 朱音))	Eri Kitamura
Sizuru Nakatsu (Note: Nakatsu Shizuru (中津 静流))	Keiko Suzuki
Lucia Konohana (Note: Konohana Ruchia (此花 ルチア))	Risa Asaki
Kagari	Kana Hanazawa
Sakuya Ohtori (Note: Ōtori Sakuya (鳳 咲夜))	Katsuyuki Konishi
Sougen Esaka	Hiroki Tōchi

The player assumes the role of Kotarou Tennouji, the protagonist of Rewrite. He is a second-year high school student who has a bright personality and is sociable to others. Kotarou is a superhuman with two powers called Rewrite and Aurora. Rewrite enables him to permanently restructure and modify any part of his body, including his blood, so as to increase his physical skills. Every time Kotarou uses his Rewrite ability, he uses up some of his life-force and becomes closer to being a full familiar. Aurora manipulates his energy to form weapons like a sword or claw. He is invited into his school's occult research society by the club president Akane Senri, who is a third-year student and is referred to as the "School Witch" by other students because of her mysterious nature. Akane, a heroine in the game, is unenthusiastic towards Kotarou's pursuit of the supernatural, which she initially claims she does not believe in, but is later shown to be a figure of authority in Gaia. Akane also invites into the club Chihaya Ohtori, a second-year transfer student in Kotarou's class who is very strong, but clumsy. Chihaya, who is also a heroine and in Gaia, has led a sheltered life and now lives with her butler Sakuya Ohtori, who poses as her brother at school despite actually being a familiar Chihaya contracts with to protect herself.

Kotarou invites three other girls into the occult research society who are also heroines in the game. One is Kotori Kanbe, Kotarou's childhood friend in his class who has few friends and starts attending school regularly after joining the club. She has a playful personality and has an extremely strong pet dog named Chibi-Moth, which is actually a familiar created by Kotori from the body of her dead pet dog Pero. However, she is not affiliated with Gaia or Guardian, and instead follows in the path of an ancient sect of summoners called Druids who revered nature and protected Kagari with familiars until Kagari was ready to make a decision to initiate re-evolution. Due to Kotori contracting her powers and Druid identity from a magical mistletoe imbued with the powers of a Druid, as well as finding a power spot that emits life energy in the forest, she can create familiars without using up her life force. Another heroine is first-year student Sizuru Nakatsu, a shy girl on the public ethics committee who has excellent hearing, eyesight and can read lips. She has heterochromia, though wears an eyepatch over her golden-colored right eye as she is very self-conscious about it; her left eye is blue. Sizuru is a member of Guardian who has the ability to produce various chemicals inside her body which can be used to heal herself and others, paralyze and cause amnesia. Sizuru joins the club with her close friend Lucia Konohana, another heroine and the class representative of Kotarou's class. Lucia is easily agitated by the antics of boys (especially Kotarou), is obsessed with cleanliness and thus always wears gloves. Like Sizuru, Lucia is a member of Guardian and has the ability to produces poisonous miasma and pus as a result of an experiment by Guardian, which she takes medication for to suppress. She can also create vibrations within the objects she touches and break glass at a distance. Both Lucia and Sizuru have superhuman speed, agility, and reflexes in addition to their other abilities.

=== Story ===
Rewrite's story revolves around the protagonist Kotarou Tennouji, a male high school student living in Kazamatsuri, and the story begins on October 3, 2010, on the Moon. Kotarou, who is interested in the mysteries of Kazamatsuri, especially the reports of unidentified mysterious animals, spends times with five girls in the occult research society at his school: Kotori Kanbe, Chihaya Ohtori, Sizuru Nakatsu, Lucia Konohana, and Akane Senri, who is also the club president. The club members spend fun, peaceful times together uncovering the supernatural mysteries of Kazamatsuri. During this time, Kotarou falls in love with each of them in separate plot lines determined by the choices the player makes. These plot lines represent various timelines in which the conflict between Gaia and Guardian occurs, although it is hinted that humanity is inevitably destroyed in every timeline.

After the five heroine's routes are completed, the story shifts to a setting amid a ruined Kazamatsuri where Kotarou encounters Kagari in a world after re-evolution, still on the Moon. Kotarou at this point is a unified entity of all the Kotarous from all timelines where humanity was destroyed and he has memories of these events. The Moon's Kagari is trying to research a way so the Earth and humanity are not destroyed, and Kotarou attempts to buy her time while fighting a hoard of familiars summoned by Sakura Kashima of Gaia whose resolve is to annihilate humanity by killing Kagari. Kotarou and the entire cast rejoin together to protect Kagari, who manages to finish her plan to allow the Earth and humanity to coexist by sending the Moon's life force back to Earth. In the past, the Earth had sent this energy to the Moon so life could continue. There is just enough energy and resources left for a final re-evolution.

Prior to the initial events of Rewrite, Kotarou had been a low-ranking member of Guardian posted in Kazamatsuri, where he encounters Kagari. In one timeline, Kotarou is badly injured by Kagari, though he is healed into a half-familiar existence by a young Kotori with a piece of Kagari's ribbon. Kotarou's aging is also slowed as a consequence. Kotarou falls into a coma, and he is administered an amnesiac drug to forget about Gaia and Guardian. By the time he wakes up, Kotori is in junior high school, and Kotarou later graduates junior high with Kotori. He goes on to spend time in high school with the occult research society as shown before. In a different timeline when he encounters Kagari, Kotarou lets her go.

Kotarou becomes disillusioned with Guardian's tactics and returns to Kazamatsuri where he meets Kagari again. She tells him she must initiate re-evolution, but since this would lead to a dead world, Kagari must find good memories brought out through the betterment of life on Earth, as opposed to bad memories caused by war and conflict. Kotarou agrees to help her and he acts as a double agent, demolishing Gaia's and Guardian's infrastructure in Kazamatsuri and killing those on either side. Kazamatsuri is partly destroyed when Gaia attempts to force Kagari to initiate re-evolution, but Kotarou manages to stop this from occurring. As a result, Kagari praises Kotarou and shows gratitude for showing her satisfactory memories. Kotarou unwillingly stabs Kagari, and after a kiss, they evolve into an orb of light inside a tree.

Humanity survives in the aftermath, but the world experiences an ice age outside of Kazamatsuri. In the city, a huge tree grows 500 meters tall in three years, which contains the orb of light from Kotarou and Kagari. The five heroines, now in high school, investigate the tree as members of the occult research society and transform Kotarou into a familiar, but he refuses to do what they demand. Kotarou takes the girls to the Moon where they are shown circled around a seedling (as the embodiment of the Moon's Kagari) sprouting on the otherwise barren regolith.

== Development ==
Rewrite is Key's ninth game, and is the first of Key's visual novels to feature a 16:9 image aspect ratio instead of the previously used 4:3 aspect ratio. Rewrite is also the first Key game to be developed on VisualArt's' game engine Siglus. The project's planning was headed by Itaru Hinoue, who is also the art director and character designer for Rewrite. During the time when Key was developing their fifth game Tomoyo After: It's a Wonderful Life in 2005, Hinoue had more free time since she was just helping Fumio with the character design, and that is when Hinoue got the initial idea for Rewrite. Hinoue wrote a proposal for the basis of Rewrite's premise and passed it on to Takahiro Baba, the president of VisualArt's.

After the project was accepted, Hinoue consulted Key's former main scenario writer Jun Maeda on various game scenario writers to employ for Rewrite. However, the one writer Hinoue wanted on the project was Romeo Tanaka, who she had become a fan of after she played FlyingShine's 2003 visual novel Cross Channel, written by Tanaka. While he did not initially accept the offer, Tanaka decided to take the project when he was given the time he needed to do the job. When he accepted it, Tanaka was still unaware that Maeda had stepped down as Key's main scenario writer, and he became more interested when he was told that he would write Rewrite's overall story.

To the president [of VisualArt's], if something like poison were injected into Rewrite, an interesting chemical reaction would take place. Romeo's scenarios are very logical, and Key can do moe as a focus, so there was nothing that was "scary". Therefore, he had the sort of feeling that if Ryukishi's taste was mixed in, the result would definitely be something deep and interesting, I heard him say.

— Yūto Tonokawa

At the time, the only other scenario writer on the project was Yūto Tonokawa of Key, who previously contributed on Key's sixth game Little Busters!. Tanaka was tasked with drawing up the entire scenario framework, and during this time, Takahiro Baba suggested that one more heroine route be added to the story to bring the total to six, but to do that they had to hire another writer. Ryukishi07 of 07th Expansion, the creators of the Higurashi no Naku Koro ni and Umineko no Naku Koro ni game franchises, was brought in as the third scenario writer after Baba suggested in late 2007 that Key ask him to join the staff for Rewrite. Ultimately, Tanaka wrote the story leading up to the heroine's routes, Kotori's and Akane's scenarios, the Moon and Terra routes, and the bonus Oppai route. Tonokawa wrote Chihaya's and Sizuru's routes, and Ryukishi07 wrote Lucia's story. Tanaka initially planned on the length of Rewrite's story to be on about the same scale as Key's second game Air, but as it increased in size, he later attempted to keep it close to the scale of Little Busters!.

Rewrite marked the first time since Key's third game Clannad that Itaru Hinoue was staffed as the sole art director and character designer in a Key visual novel. The school uniforms for the heroines in the game are old designs that Hinoue created and used before in dōjinshi (self-published work). In particular, Hinoue spent much time on drawing the character art in Rewrite due in part to the design of the school uniforms, the fact that most of the female characters have long hair, and because of the increased aspect ratio. Six more graphic artists worked on Rewrite: Torino headed the background art, Ryou Shigawa designed and illustrated the monsters, and the computer graphics in the game were done by Na-Ga, Shinory, Mochisuke, and Minimo Tayama. The game's soundtrack was composed by Key's signature composers Jun Maeda and Shinji Orito, in addition to Maiko Iuchi of I've Sound, Sōshi Hosoi, and Ryō Mizutsuki. Maeda also contributed on the quality control for the game.

=== Marketing and release ===
Rewrite was announced on April 1, 2008, which led to some speculation whether it was an April Fool's joke or an actual announcement of Key's new game. It was announced the following day on Key's blog that production on Rewrite had begun. On April 1, 2010, Rewrite's official website was updated with the announcement that the game would be an adult game, but this turned out to be an April Fool's joke the following day. It was later reported by Key in February 2011 that an adult version of Rewrite would definitely not be produced. On April 1, 2011, Key released an anime video featuring the song "Rewrite" by Psychic Lover. The video was animated by White Fox, and directed by Motoki Tanaka. Again there was some speculation on its validity, but Key confirmed the following day that the video and song would be used in Rewrite as the game's second opening theme song.

Key hosted a promotional event on May 8, 2011, called Rewrite Fes. in Akihabara. Displayed in the event hall were various large illustrations of Rewrite characters by Hinoue, as well as illustrations of the characters by various artists that were originally posted on Rewrite's official website. The event featured live performances by NanosizeMir and Psychic Lover, as well as on-stage discussions of Rewrite development staff members and voice actors featured in the game. The staff members included Tonokawa and Ryukishi07 who discussed the game's scenario, and Orito and Hoshi who talked about Rewrite's music. Orito also performed at the event on an electric guitar decorated with images of Rewrite including character images and the title logo. The guitar was later sold on Yahoo! Auctions in July 2011 for 405,000 yen. Promotional items that could be purchased at the event included a Rewrite introduction pamphlet, a Rewrite stationery set, a remix album titled Deejay Busters! featuring remixes of music from Little Busters! and Key's eighth game Kud Wafter, and a Kanon light novel titled Kanojotachi no Kenkai (彼女たちの見解, The Girls' Opinions) written by Mariko Shimizu and illustrated by Zen.

A lengthy game demo of Rewrite came bundled with the limited-edition version of Kud Wafter released on June 25, 2010. Another slightly longer version of the demo, ver. 2.00, was released on Rewrite's official website on March 26, 2011. A free benchmark program titled Chihaya Rolling became available for download at Key's official website on August 20, 2010. The program, which also came with the previously released demo, features Chihaya rolling down a hill and hitting boulders and Kotori's pet dog Chibi-Moth. The purpose of the program is to test whether a given Windows computer will be able to play Rewrite or other games using the Siglus game engine. If a rank of D and above is shown, gameplay of Rewrite will be normal, but if E is shown, gameplay will be fairly normal other than a few exceptions. Between April 21 and May 9, 2011, VisualArt's accepted orders for a "Rewrite Note PC" laptop in two versions: a normal version and an AKN version with higher specifications; AKN refers to Akane. The AKN version has one random signature from either Hinoue, Orito or Tonokawa, though VisualArt's also sold the AKN version without the signature. The AKN version also contained 16 Rewrite wallpaper images, with the normal version having nine. The laptops feature five separate themes of system sounds, which use dialogue of the voice actresses of five Rewrite heroines: Kotori, Chihaya, Akane, Sizuru and Lucia.

While Rewrite was originally planned to be released on April 28, 2011, the game was later released on June 24, 2011, as a limited-edition version, playable as a 2-disc DVD set on a Windows PC. The limited edition came bundled with an approximately 80-page official guide book titled Rewrite of the Life, a remix album titled Soil, a CD containing recordings of the Internet radio show Radio Rewrite, three original cards from the Weiß Schwarz trading card game, an original card from the Lycèe Trading Card Game, three extra DVD case covers, and a mobile phone strap. Over two dozen stores in Akihabara and online offered special promotional items if the limited-edition version of the game was bought at their store. These items included telephone cards, gift cards, mobile phone straps, pin buttons, desk mats, posters, cushion covers, tote bags, tapestries, and bed sheets. The regular edition of Rewrite was released on September 30, 2011. Prototype released a PlayStation Portable (PSP) port of Rewrite on April 17, 2014; those who pre-ordered the game also received an exclusive drama CD. Prototype also released a PlayStation Vita (PS Vita) version on August 28, 2014, and the drama CD bundled with the PSP version was also bundled with the PS Vita version for a limited time only. Prototype released a PlayStation 3 version on February 11, 2015.

=== Fan disc and Rewrite+ ===
In interviews before the release of Rewrite, Tonokawa expressed interest in expanding on the story if the game was well received. Shortly after Rewrite's release, Tonokawa approached Takahiro Baba with the proposal, who gave his approval for the production of a fan disc. Titled Rewrite Harvest festa!, the fan disc was produced by the same staff as Rewrite, and was released on July 27, 2012, playable on a Windows PC. It came bundled with the fan disc's original soundtrack titled Feast, a CD containing recordings of Radio Rewrite, an original booklet, two mobile phone straps, and one promotional card each from the trading card games Weiß Schwarz, Lycèe and Phantasmagoria. Prototype released a PS Vita port of Harvest festa! on May 18, 2017.

The scenario consists of spin-off stories which expand on Rewrite's story, the harvest festival from Rewrite's story is expanded on in Harvest festa!, and minigames are included during the course of gameplay, as in Rewrite. The size of the scenario in Harvest festa! is roughly comparable in size to Tomoyo After. The fan disc also features official character art of Inoue, a supporting character who was not illustrated in Rewrite. Unlike Rewrite, Kotarou is fully voiced in the fan disc. The five system sound themes included with the Rewrite laptops were released with the fan disc, with the addition of dialogue of Kagari by Kana Hanazawa.

To advertise Harvest festa!, Good Smile Racing produced an itasha (a car featuring illustrations of anime-styled characters) of a 2008 Daihatsu Hijet Cargo decorated with images from the game, and drove it around Japan between May 30 and July 26, 2012. The car was put onto the Japanese Yahoo! Auction website on September 3, 2012, and sold for 1,806,000 yen after starting the auction at 1 yen. Like the previously held Rewrite Fes., Key hosted a promotional event on June 10, 2012, called Rewrite Harvest festa! Fes. in Akihabara. The event featured live performances by NanosizeMir and Aoi Tada, as well as on-stage discussions of development staff members Tonokawa and Orito, and voice actors featured in the game.

Key released an updated version of Rewrite titled Rewrite+ on July 29, 2016, for Windows. It includes various improvements and revisions to the scenario led by Romeo Tanaka, and additional illustrations not in the original game. Rewrite+ contains the additional content featured in the consumer ports, including fully voicing over 500 characters, and the official character art of Inoue. Rewrite+ came bundled with Rewrite Harvest festa!, a remix album titled Selene featuring music from both Rewrite and Harvest festa!, a CD containing recordings of the Internet radio show Radio Rewrite, and an original card from the Weiß Schwarz trading card game. Prototype released a PlayStation 4 version with the additional content from Rewrite+ on March 23, 2017. An English version of Rewrite+ was released by Sekai Project on December 17, 2021. Sekai Project also released Harvest festa! in English on July 14, 2025, with an early release on July 5 for Kickstarter backers.

== Adaptations ==
- Rewrite
- Genre: Action, Fantasy, Romance
- Manga
- Rewrite: Side-B; Rewrite: Side-R; Rewrite: Okaken e Yōkoso!!; Rewrite: Okaken Blog; Rewrite: Side-Terra
- Light novel
- Official Another Story Rewrite: Ha Yure Sasayaku Shōkei de
- Anime television series
- Directed by: Motoki Tanaka (Note: Credited under the pseudonym Tenshō)
- Written by: Motoki Tanaka; Tatsuya Takahashi; Takashi Aoshima; Takayo Ikami
- Music by: Jun Maeda; Shinji Orito; Maiko Iuchi; Sōshi Hosoi; Ryō Mizutsuki
- Studio: Eight Bit
- Licensed by: Crunchyroll
- Original network: Tokyo MX, GTV, GYT, MBS, BS11
- Original run: July 2, 2016 – March 25, 2017
- Episodes: 24

=== Print media ===
A manga adaptation, illustrated by Sakana Tōjō and titled Rewrite: Side-B, began serialization in the October 2010 issue of ASCII Media Works' Dengeki G's Magazine. The manga ended serialization in the magazine's May 2014 issue and continued serialization in Dengeki G's Comic between the June 2014 and July 2015 issues. Eight tankōbon volumes for Side-B were released between April 27, 2011, and July 27, 2015. A second manga, illustrated by Shūichi Kawakami and titled Rewrite: Side-R, was serialized between the April 2011 and September 2013 issues of ASCII Media Works' Dengeki Daioh. Five volumes of Side-R were released between June 27, 2011, and October 26, 2013. Side-B and Side-R are meant to be read together as a pair. A third, four-panel comic strip manga, illustrated by Miyura Yano and titled Rewrite: Okaken e Yōkoso!! (Rewrite オカ研へようこそ!!), was serialized between the June 2011 and April 2014 issues of Ichijinsha's Manga 4-koma Palette. Two volumes of Okaken e Yōkoso!! were released: the first on July 21, 2012, and the second on August 22, 2014. A fourth manga, illustrated by Yayoi Hazuki and titled Rewrite: Okaken Blog (Rewrite ‒OKA☆KEN ぶろぐ‒), was serialized between volumes 20 and 29 of ASCII Media Works' Dengeki G's Festival! Comic sold between October 26, 2011, and April 26, 2013. Two volumes of Okaken Blog were released: the first on July 27, 2012, and the second on July 27, 2013. A fifth manga, illustrated by Zen and titled Rewrite: Side-Terra, was serialized between the November 2016 issue of Dengeki G's Comic sold on September 30, 2016 and the September 2018 issue sold on July 30, 2018. Four volumes of Side-Terra were released between September 27, 2016, and September 27, 2018.

There have also been several sets of manga anthologies produced by different companies and drawn by a multitude of different artists. An anthology published by Taibundo and illustrated by Zen titled Earth Star Comics Rewrite was published in September 2011. Two volumes of an anthology series released by Ichijinsha under the title Rewrite Comic Anthology were released between September and November 2011, with a third volume to be released in September 2016. Enterbrain released two volumes of a collection of four-panel comic strips under the title Magi-Cu 4-koma Rewrite between December 2011 and March 2012. A manga anthology titled Rewrite Comic A La Carte: Okaken Katsudō Hōkokusho (Rewrite コミックアラカルト オカ研活動報告書) appeared in Kadokawa Shoten's Comp Ace and a single volume was released in October 2011.

A series of seven short stories titled Official Another Story Rewrite: Ha Yure Sasayaku Shōkei de (Official Another Story Rewrite -葉揺れささやく小径で-), written by the scenario writers of Rewrite and illustrated by Zen, were serialized between the September 2011 and March 2012 issues of Dengeki G's Magazine. Self-described as an official illustrated story for Rewrite, the short stories were collected into a single volume released on July 27, 2012. Three volumes of a short story compilation series by several authors titled Rewrite SSS were published by Harvest between October 2011 and January 2012. Four volumes of a light novel anthology published by Paradigm under their VA Bunko imprint titled Rewrite Novel Anthology were released between November 2011 and February 2012. A 224-page art book titled Rewrite Perfect Visual Book (Rewrite パーフェクトビジュアルブック) was released on November 30, 2011, by ASCII Media Works. The art book contains story summaries of the game's scenarios, information on the cast of characters, interviews from the production staff, and illustrations featuring art from the game.

=== Internet radio show ===
An Internet radio show to promote Rewrite called Radio Rewrite: Gekkan Tera Kazamatsuri Gakuin Shikyoku (ラジオRewrite 月刊テラ・風祭学院支局, Radio Rewrite: Terra Monthly Magazine - Kazamatsuri Academy Branch) broadcast 70 episodes between May 27, 2011, and September 28, 2012. The show was streamed online every Friday, and was produced by the Japanese Internet radio stations Hibiki and Onsen. The show was hosted by Masakazu Morita and Chiwa Saitō, who voice Kotarou Tennouji and Kotori Kanbe from the game, respectively. Seven CD compilation volumes containing all 70 episodes were released between September 30, 2011, and August 28, 2013.

=== Anime ===
A 24-episode anime television series adaptation is directed by Motoki Tanaka and produced by Eight Bit. The first 13 episodes aired between July 2 and September 24, 2016. The latter 11 episodes aired from January 14 to March 25, 2017, and adapt the Moon and Terra routes from the visual novel. The series was streamed by Crunchyroll with English subtitles. The screenplay is written by Tanaka with Romeo Tanaka and Kai credited with collaborating on the composition and scripts, and Takashi Aoshima, Tatsuya Takahashi and Takayo Ikami wrote individual episodes. The series features character design by Masayuki Nonaka who based the designs on Itaru Hinoue's original concepts. The series was released on 13 DVD and Blu-ray compilation volumes between September 28, 2016, and September 27, 2017, by Aniplex. Daisuki later added the series to their streaming service via Anime Consortium Japan.

The first opening theme is "Philosophyz (TV animation ver.)" and the first ending theme is "Sasayaka na Hajimari (TV animation ver.)" (ささやかなはじまり 〜TV animation ver.〜), both sung by Runa Mizutani of NanosizeMir. Both songs are remixes of theme songs featured in the original Rewrite and Rewrite Harvest festa! visual novels. The second opening theme is "End of the World" by Anri Kumaki and the second ending theme is "Word of Dawn" by Aoi Tada. The third opening theme is "Tabi" (旅), an instrumental piece composed by Jun Maeda. The fourth opening theme is "Last Desire" sung by Maon Kurosaki and the third ending theme is "Instincts" by Mizutani. The rest of the soundtrack for the anime series is sampled from the Rewrite Original Soundtrack and Feast.

== Music ==
Rewrite has seven pieces of theme music: two opening themes and five ending themes. The first opening theme is "Philosophyz" by Runa Mizutani of the dōjin music group NanosizeMir. The second opening theme is "Rewrite" by Psychic Lover. The first ending theme is "Yami no Kanata e" (闇の彼方へ, Beyond the Darkness) by NanosizeMir, and it is used for Kotori's, Chihaya's and Lucia's scenarios. The next two ending themes are "Koibumi" (恋文, Love Letter) and "Itsuwaranai Kimi e" (偽らない君へ), both sung by Nagi Yanagi. "Koibumi" is used for Sizuru's route, and "Itsuwaranai Kimi e" is used for Akane's story. "Itsuwaranai Kimi e" is also used as an insert song during Lucia's route. The last two ending themes are "Watari no Uta" (渡りの詩) used in the Moon route, and "Canoe" used in the Terra route, both sung by Aoi Tada.

In Rewrite Harvest festa!, the opening theme is "Harvest" by Tada, and the ending theme is "Sasayaka na Hajimari" (ささやかなはじまり) by NanosizeMir. "Philosophyz", "Itsuwaranai Kimi e", and "Watari no Uta" are used in the fan disc as insert songs. Eight of the main characters from Rewrite have background music leitmotifs—the six heroines, Haruhiko Yoshino and Sakuya Ohtori. Kagari's theme is "Hinagiku" (ヒナギク, Daisy); Kotori's theme is "Nirinsō" (ニリンソウ, Soft Windflower); Chihaya's theme is "Asagao" (アサガオ, Morning Glory); Akane's theme is "Anthurium" (アンスリウム, Ansuriumu); Sizuru's theme is "Carnation" (カーネーション, Kānēshon); Lucia's theme is "Sunbright" (サンブライト, Sanburaito); Yoshino's theme is "DIS is a Pain"; lastly, Sakuya's theme is "Sanka" (散花).

The single for "Philosophyz" was released on January 28, 2011. The single contained "Philosophyz" and "Yami no Kanata e" in original, short and instrumental versions. A single for "Rewrite" was released on May 27, 2011. As with Key's previous works (excluding Planetarian: The Reverie of a Little Planet), a music album came bundled with the limited-edition release of the game; the album, released on June 24, 2011, is titled Soil and contains arranged versions of ten tracks of the game's music. Rewrite's original soundtrack was first released on August 12, 2011, at Comiket 80 containing 63 tracks; it was later released for general sale on October 28, 2011. A remix album titled Branch was released on December 29, 2011, at Comiket 81. The original soundtrack for Rewrite Harvest festa!, titled Feast, was released bundled with the fan disc on July 27, 2012.

A remix album titled Dye Mixture featuring tracks from both Rewrite and Harvest festa! was released on December 29, 2012, at Comiket 83. Another remix album titled Crann Mor featuring tracks from Rewrite was released on December 29, 2015, at Comiket 89. A single performed by Mizutani was released on July 27, 2016, for the anime series titled "Philosophyz / Sasayaka na Hajimari", which contains the anime's opening and ending themes in original, short, and instrumental versions. A remix album titled Selene featuring tracks from both Rewrite and Harvest festa! was released on July 29, 2016, bundled with Rewrite+. Two singles for the anime were released on September 21, 2016: "End of the World / Hetakuso na Uta" by Anri Kumaki and "Word of Dawn / Okiraku Kyūsai" by Tada. An image song album titled Pureness Rhapsody, sung by Saya Shinomiya and Risa Asaki, the voice actresses who voiced Chihaya and Lucia respectively, was released on December 29, 2016, at Comiket 91. Two more singles for the anime were released on March 22, 2017: "Last Desire" by Maon Kurosaki and "Instincts" by Mizutani. Each of the singles and albums released were on Key's record label Key Sounds Label.

== Reception ==
In 2011, Rewrite ranked five times in the top ten in national PC game pre-orders in Japan. The rankings were at No. 9 in January, No. 4 in February, No. 3 in March, and twice at No. 1 in April and May. Rewrite ranked first in terms of national sales of PC games in Japan in June 2011. Rewrite would rank twice more in the top 50 highest selling PC games in Japan, at No. 14 in July and at No. 29 in August 2011. According to public sales information published at Gamasutra, taken from the Japanese Amazon website, Rewrite was the number one top seller of PC games in Japan the day of its release. Rewrite premiered as the No. 1 game sold on Getchu.com, a major redistributor of visual novel and domestic anime products, during the month of its release, and at No. 30 in July. The game would go on to be the No. 8 game sold for the first half of 2011, and at No. 11 for the whole year. In 2012, Rewrite Harvest festa! ranked three times in the top ten in national PC game pre-orders in Japan. The rankings were at No. 6 in April, No. 3 in May, and No. 1 in June. Harvest festa! ranked first in terms of national sales of PC games in Japan in July 2012.

On the day of its release, two video game retailers in Akihabara opened two hours early for advance sales of Rewrite. The main Gamers store opened at 7 a.m. to a line of about 200 people. The Sofmap Amusement store opened at 9 a.m. and used two floors in the eight-story building for sales of Rewrite: the fifth floor was used for general sale and advance orders of the game, while the eighth floor was used solely for those who had reserved their copy. The PSP port in 2014 was reviewed by the Japanese video game magazine Famitsu, which gave it an overall score of 30/40 (out of the four individual review scores of 7, 8, 8 and 7).

Key held a character popularity poll between December 15–31, 2011 for every character from the game, even very minor ones. The top three winners would each get a downloadable wallpaper, and first place would get original artwork for the wallpaper. A voter could vote one time for up to three characters per day. While Sizuru led at first, Akane surged ahead near the end. The top three winners were Akane with 18,042 votes, Sizuru with 16,839 votes, and Lucia with 15,047 votes.

=== Legacy ===
A mobile app game for iOS and Android titled Key Collection, produced by Index Corporation and distributed via Mobage, was released in September 2013. The player collects cards of varying rarity featuring characters from several visual novels developed by Key, including Rewrite, obtained through completing various minigame missions, to form a team. The player then trains the team's members to improve their statistics and eventually challenge others who play the game.

A mobile social role-playing game for iOS and Android titled Rewrite IgnisMemoria, produced by Team Aeca under VisualArt's, was released on February 6, 2017. The game features an original story with over 50 routes with a turn-based combat system. Combat teams consist of any three of the six main characters and the team is powered up with cards acquired through a randomized gacha system. It is also possible to customize the Occult Research Society's clubroom and Kotori's forest studio where the characters reside as a home base. The game's theme song is "Ignis Memory" sung by Maon Kurosaki. The game closed on December 31, 2017.

The first volume of a Windows visual novel, titled Okaken Katsudō Kiroku Gaiden (オカ研活動記録外伝, Occult Club Activity Log Side Story), was released with the fourth DVD and Blu-ray compilation volume for the Rewrite anime series on December 21, 2016. The second visual novel volume was released with the anime's eighth DVD and Blu-ray compilation volume on April 26, 2017, and the third visual novel volume was released with the anime's thirteenth DVD and Blu-ray compilation volume on September 27, 2017. The game is produced by VisualArt's and written by Ryukishi07.
