= Yūto Tonokawa =

Japanese video game scenario writer

- Born: January 25; Saitama, Japan
- Occupations: Author, lyricist
- Writing career
- Genres: Fantasy, Fiction
- Notable works: Little Busters!, Rewrite

Yūto Tonokawa (都乃河 勇人, Tonokawa Yūto; born January 25) (pseudonym) is a Japanese scenario writer originally from Saitama, Japan. He had worked for the visual novel studio Key under VisualArt's. He began working with Key on their sixth game Little Busters! and wrote the scenarios for two of the main heroines: Komari Kamikita, and Yuiko Kurugaya. Tonokawa also wrote the scenario for Sasami Sasasegawa in Little Busters! Ecstasy. He provided the lyrics to one of the ending themes from the same game, "Alicemagic", as his first job as a lyricist. Tonokawa wrote the scenarios for Chihaya Ohtori and Sizuru Nakatsu in Key's ninth game Rewrite. Among Key's staff, Tonokawa updated the company's official blog the most often. Despite his accomplishments, Tonokawa has referred to himself as "only an incompetent writer." In July 2008, Tonokawa was living in the same apartment building in Osaka that Jun Maeda had once lived in, though he did not know this when he moved into the building. Tonokawa resigned from Key in 2015.

== Biography ==
=== Early life ===
Yūto Tonokawa started writing while in junior-high school, though these were only short stories. He stated himself that while he never read much, he did read light novels and modern literature while in junior-high. While in high school, Tonokawa read works by the philosophers Søren Kierkegaard and Ludwig Wittgenstein, and Japanese folklorists Kunio Yanagita and Shinobu Orikuchi. Tonokawa at one point wanted to be either a voice actor or manga author, and it was not until after he entered high school that he decided to become a scenario writer. Since he wanted to participate in a job that told stories, he feels that either way he has achieved that goal. While still in school, Tonokawa experimented on the KiriKiri scripting engine and made an amateur "novel game", but it did not have visuals or music. He felt it was a good learning experience as a scenario writer since he discovered how different it is to write regular stories compared to writing scenarios for a game.

=== Career ===
Originally, Tonokawa came to VisualArt's and applied under a different brand under the publishing company, but coincidentally the timing was just right since Jun Maeda of Key was looking for another writer to join the team, which ultimately led to Tonokawa joining Key as a scenario writer. Tonokawa was able to initially catch the attention of the application examiners with a 600-page résumé featuring a story centering on a female protagonist, but since there was no market for this format at the time, he later filled out a regular application. As noted by himself, Tonokawa started working for Key almost immediately after graduating from university, and he sees this as a major turning point in his life. Tonokawa said that Maeda was a major influence on his life, and if not for Maeda, he would not be where he is today. Originally, Tonokawa was supposed to work in the role of an outsourced writer who would help Maeda as a scenario assistant, but was brought in-house due to a quick need for a new writer. Due to Maeda stepping down as the main scenario writer for Key after the production of Little Busters! Ecstasy, Tonokawa was the sole writer within Key at the time.

At the time Tonokawa joined Key in August 2005, the team was working on debugging Tomoyo After: It's a Wonderful Life. He started working with Key on their sixth game Little Busters! and wrote the scenarios for two of the main heroines: Komari Kamikita, and Yuiko Kurugaya. Tonokawa also wrote the scenario for Sasami Sasasegawa in Little Busters! Ecstasy. He provided the lyrics to one of the ending themes from Little Busters!, "Alicemagic", as his first job as a lyricist, though feels that composing music is difficult. Tonokawa also wrote some of the additional story for Takafumi and Kanako included in the PlayStation 2 version of Tomoyo After: It's a Wonderful Life. Tonokawa wrote the scenarios for Chihaya Ohtori and Sizuru Nakatsu in Key's ninth game Rewrite. Tonokawa resigned from Key in 2015.
