= Ayaka Kitazawa =

Japanese singer from Saitama (born 1989)

- Born: April 21, 1989 (age 37); Saitama, Japan
- Genres: Pop
- Occupation: Singer
- Years active: 2008–present
- Label: Key Sounds Label (2012–present)
- Website: ayaka-kitazawa.com

Ayaka Kitazawa (北沢 綾香, Kitazawa Ayaka; born April 21, 1989) is a Japanese singer from Saitama who has released music under Key Sounds Label since 2012. In 2013, she sang the ending theme song to the anime series Little Busters! Refrain.

== Career ==
Ayaka Kitazawa had an interest in singing from a young age, and she played the double bass in junior high and high school. After graduating from high school, she pursued her love of singing and went on to attend a music-related vocational school. While still at the school, she participated in national singing competitions such as "Jaccom Music Festival" in December 2008 and "Seishun! Hamo Nep League" in March 2009. In September 2011, Kitazawa sang one song on Denshi Kensetsu's album Ongaku Shiki Complete Dam released by Victor Entertainment. After graduation, she was contracted under the Sun Music Brain talent agency from 2012 to 2013. In January 2012, she auditioned to be a singer on Shinji Orito's album Circle of Fifth released by Key Sounds Label later that year in October, and was chosen to sing six songs. Kitazawa's debut single "Kimi to no Nakushi Mono / Namidairo no Tsubasa" (君とのなくしもの / 涙色の翼) was released on November 6, 2013; "Kimi to no Nakushi Mono" was used as the ending theme to the 2013 anime series Little Busters! Refrain. In April 2014, Key Sounds Label used the crowdfunding website MotionGallery to raise funds to produce Kitazawa's debut album. After two days, the project reached its goal of 1 million yen, and after 30 days had earned 2,707,000 yen. Kitazawa's debut album Nature Couleur was released on June 25, 2014.

== Discography ==
=== Albums ===
Year	Album details	Peak Oricon chart positions
2014	Nature Couleur: Released: June 25, 2014; Label: Key Sounds (KSLM-0097); Format: CD	—
"—" denotes releases that did not chart.

=== Singles ===
Year	Song	Peak Oricon chart positions	Album
2013	"Kimi to no Nakushi Mono / Namidairo no Tsubasa"	28	

=== Other album appearances ===
Year	Song(s)	Album	Notes	Ref.
2011	"Mizu no Nai Dam"	Ongaku Shiki Complete Dam	Album featuring various artists produced by Denshi Kensetsu	
2012	"Orpheus (Kimi to Kanaderu Ashita e no Uta) (Ayaka Ver)"	Orpheus: Kimi to Kanaderu Ashita e no Uta	Theme song for the Visual Art's Daikanshasai event.	
2012	"Last Word" "Sunbright" "Orpheus (Kimi to Kanaderu Ashita e no Uta) (Ayaka Ver)" "Fortune Card" "Perseids" "Bokura no Tabi"	Circle of Fifth	Album featuring various artists produced by Shinji Orito.	
2014	"Bokura no Tabi" "Namidairo no Tsubasa" "Kimi to no Nakushi Mono"	Little Busters! Perfect Vocal Collection	A compilation album of vocal music featured in the Little Busters! and Little Busters! Ecstasy visual novels and their anime adaptations.	
2015	"Todoketai Melody"	"Todoketai Melody / Towa no Hoshi e"	Theme song to the Harmonia visual novel.	

=== Other video album appearances ===
Year	Song(s)	Video album	Artist(s)	Notes	Ref.
2013	"Sunbright" "Orpheus (Kimi to Kanaderu Ashita e no Uta)"	Visual Art's Daikanshasai Live 2012 in Yokohama Arena: Kimi to Kanaderu Ashita e no Uta	Various artists	"Orpheus (Kimi to Kanaderu Ashita e no Uta)" is sung by all of the artists.	
