= Anri Kumaki =

Japanese pop female singer-songwriter (born 1982)

- Born: Anri Kumaki (熊木杏里); January 27, 1982 (age 44)
- Origin: Chikuma, Nagano, Japan
- Genres: J-pop
- Occupations: Singer, songwriter
- Instruments: guitar, piano
- Years active: 2002–present
- Labels: VAP, King, unBORDE

Anri Kumaki (熊木 杏里, Kumaki Anri; born January 27, 1982) is a Japanese pop female singer-songwriter currently signed on unBORDE Records, a division of Warner Music Group Japan.

== Biography ==
Anri Kumaki started writing songs when she was 17 years old and won the audition of a TV program which was broadcast by Nippon Television in 2001. She debuted with her Single "Madoe"(窓絵) arranged by Ryo Yoshimata (吉俣良).

== Discography ==
=== Singles ===
1. Madoe (窓絵)(February 21, 2002)
2. Sakazutote (咲かずとて)(August 21, 2002)
3. Ima wa Mukashi (今は昔)(February 21, 2003)
4. Watashi o Tadoru Monogatari (私をたどる物語)(April 6, 2005)
5. Tatakai no Mujun (戦いの矛盾)(January 25, 2006)
6. Ryūsei (流星)(May 24, 2006)
7. Atarashii Watashi ni Natte (新しい私になって)(November 22, 2006)
8. Haru no Kaze (春の風)(February 21, 2007)
9. Shichigatsu no Tomodachi (七月の友だち)(July 25, 2007)
10. Harudonari (春隣)(May 21, 2008)
11. Mouichido (モウイチド)(September 24, 2008)
12. Koto (こと)(December 22, 2008)
13. Ame Ga Sora Kara Hanaretara (雨が空から離れたら)(April 8, 2009)
14. Kimi no Namae (君の名前)(June 17, 2009)
15. Kyo ni Narukara (今日になるから)(January 18, 2012)
16. Love letter 〜Sakura〜 (Love letter 〜桜〜)(March 7, 2012)

=== Albums ===
1. Sappūkei (殺風景)(March 26, 2003)
2. Mu kara Deta Sabi (無から出た錆)(May 23, 2005)
3. Kaze no Naka no Kōshin (風の中の行進)(September 21, 2006)
4. Watashi wa Watashi o Ato ni Shite (私は私をあとにして)(October 24, 2007)
5. Hito Hinata (ひとヒナタ)(November 5, 2008)
6. Hana Yori Hoka Ni (はなよりほかに)(November 6, 2009)
7. Hikari No Touri Michi (光の通り道)(February 22, 2012)
8. Shiroi Ashiato (白い足あと)(December 12, 2012)

=== Compilation albums ===
1. Kaze To Nagi (風と凪)(March 10, 2010)

=== Extended plays ===
1. and...Life(October 5, 2011)

=== Soundtracks ===
1. Kimi No Moji (君の文字) (from the Key anime Charlotte) (November 4, 2015)
