= Planetarian: The Reverie of a Little Planet =

2004 video game

- Cover featuring heroine Yumemi Hoshino
- Developer: Key
- Publishers: Visual Arts, KineticNovel (Windows, Android, iOS); Prototype (PS2, FOMA, S3G, PSP, Switch); WW: Sekai Project (Windows)
- Artist: Eeji Komatsu
- Writer: Yūichi Suzumoto
- Composers: Magome Togoshi; Shinji Orito
- Platforms: Microsoft Windows, PlayStation 2, Freedom of Mobile Multimedia Access, SoftBank 3G, PlayStation Portable, Android, iOS, Nintendo Switch
- Release: The Reverie of a Little Planet November 29, 2004: Windows; JP: November 29, 2004; JP: April 30, 2010; WW: September 12, 2014; JP: July 29, 2016 (Note: This release was subtitled the HD edition.); JP: September 3, 2021; WW: September 19, 2022 PlayStation 2; JP: August 24, 2006 FOMA, SoftBank 3G; JP: November 28, 2006 PlayStation Portable; JP: August 24, 2009 Android; JP: November 30, 2011 iOS; JP: November 30, 2011; WW: January 7, 2013 Nintendo Switch; WW: January 31, 2019; Snow Globe September 3, 2021: Windows; JP: September 3, 2021; WW: April 30, 2024 Nintendo Switch; WW: June 27, 2024
- Genre: Visual novel
- Mode: Single-player

Planetarian: The Reverie of a Little Planet (planetarian ～ちいさなほしのゆめ～, Planetarian: Chiisana Hoshi no Yume) is a Japanese post-apocalyptic visual novel developed by Key, a brand of Visual Arts whose previous works include Kanon and Air. It was released over the Internet on November 29, 2004, for Windows, and is rated for all ages. The game was later ported to the PlayStation 2 (PS2), PlayStation Portable and Nintendo Switch, as well as mobile devices. The story centers on a man who comes across a malfunctioning robot in a dead city. The man, known simply as "the junker", stays with this robot for a time and attempts to fix the projector of the planetarium where the story takes place.

Key defines Planetarian as a "kinetic novel", since it offers no choices or alternate endings. Instead, the reader proceeds through the story solely linearly. The story is written by Yūichi Suzumoto and character design is produced by Eeji Komatsu. The game's soundtrack was composed and arranged by Key's signature composers Magome Togoshi and Shinji Orito.

A light novel of short stories set in the world of Planetarian was released in April 2006, and three audio dramas have also been produced. David Production produced a five-episode original net animation series and an anime film in 2016. Planetarian's story, artwork and music have been praised, and the PS2 version ranked first for console games in terms of satisfaction in 2007.

== Gameplay ==
Text in Planetarian is displayed in a dialog box, here depicting the player character talking with Yumemi.

Planetarian is a post-apocalyptic visual novel in which the player assumes the role of the junker. Unlike traditional visual novels, no choices are given to the player in Planetarian to advance the story, and there is only one possible ending; this is what Key referred to as a kinetic novel. The player can choose when to advance to the next dialogue screen or put the game on auto play. In this respect, the player does not play the game as if it were a video game, but plays it rather more like one would play a music track on a CD or play a DVD film. During gameplay, the player can choose to hide the text from view and go back to any previous lines. The game can be saved at any point in any of the five save slots available, and a load option is available where the player can load any of the automatically saved chapter markers, or choose to load any of the manually saved games.

By length of story, Planetarian is the shortest of Key's games. Excluding the opening and ending sequences, there are 16 parts to the story; the first half is set within the planetarium while the latter half is set outside in the ruined city where the planetarium resides. The novel takes four hours and forty minutes to complete on auto play. (Note: The stated time assumes that the default auto play speed is used, which allots 0.07 seconds per character with a minimum time of 0.3 seconds. This reflects about the average time it takes the text to be read aloud at a normal pace. Quick readers can easily go through the entire novel in less than half of this stated time.) After the game has been completed at least once, two new options appear on the title screen. The first is a feature that allows the player to view twenty images of CG artwork observed in the game. The second option allows the player to listen to eight of the nine music tracks featured in the game.

== Plot ==
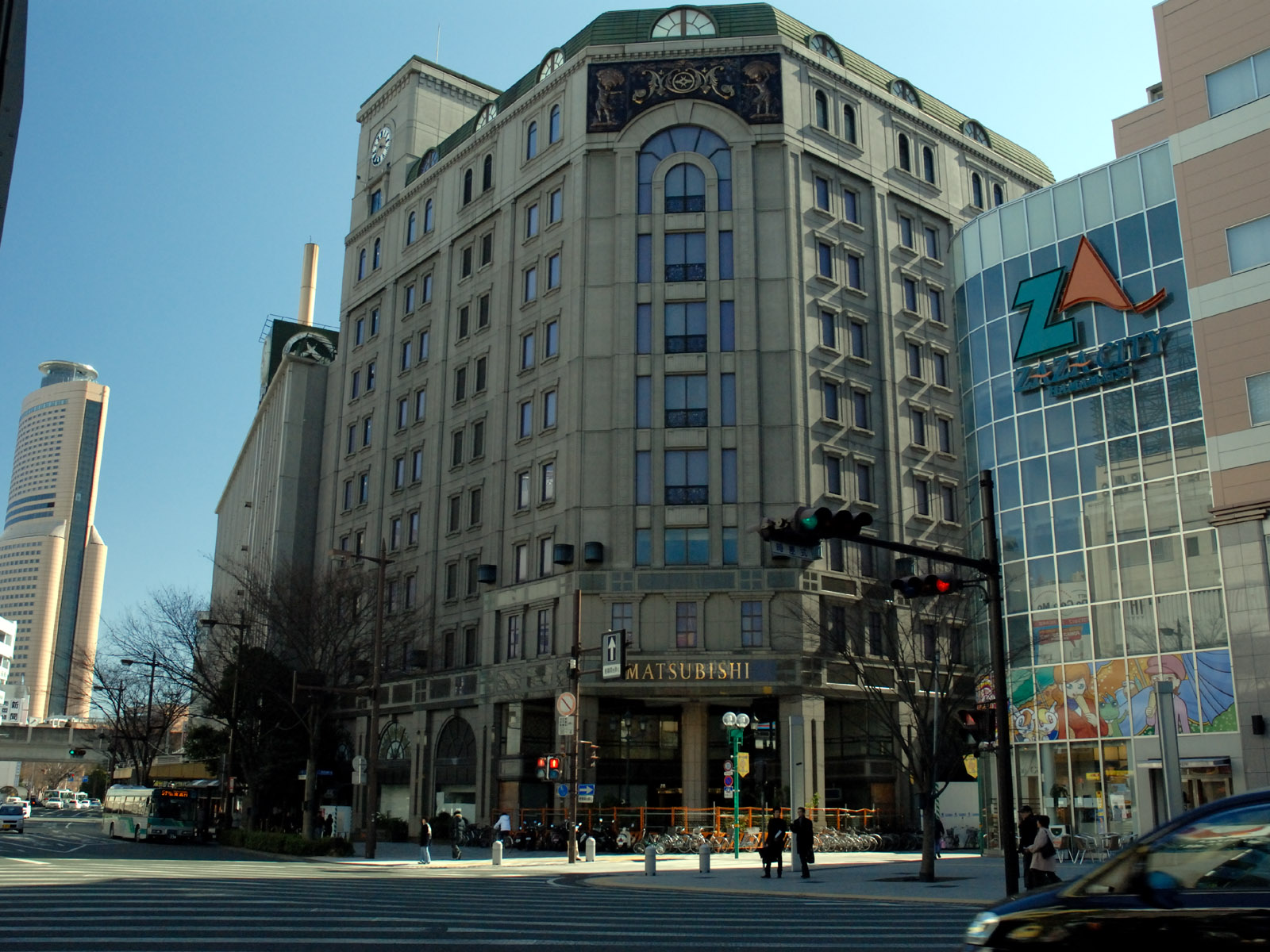
Matsubishi Department Store, the real life counterpart of Flowercrest Department Store in Planetarian

=== Setting ===
The game is set in a post-apocalyptic world. It is said that due to the depletion of natural resources, overpopulation, and the failure of the Space Exploration Project, humanity has virtually eradicated itself through biological and nuclear warfare, turning a once prosperous civilization into complete ruin, cast in darkness and poisoned by constant rain from nuclear fallout. One military invasion in the past was at Mare Nectaris. The bloodshed continues 30 years after the war in a dystopic world via automated war machines, which kill anyone trespassing into their territory. Of the remaining humans, there are those known as "junkers" who go around scavenging for anything in order to survive; the protagonist in the story is one.

The main location where most of the story takes place is the fictional Flowercrest Department Store in a derelict city. It is based on the real Matsubishi Department Store of Hamamatsu, Shizuoka in Japan, although the planetarium on the rooftop is fictitious. The onset of the story takes place within the planetarium which is where the protagonist first meets Yumemi. The most prominent feature in the room when a show is not taking place is the large black planetarium projector called "Miss Jena", (Note: Jena is a manufacturing city in Germany, specializing in precision machinery, pharmaceuticals, optics and photographic equipment, and is home to the Zeiss optics plant. In 1926, the world's first modern planetarium was built by the Zeiss company in the Damenviertel district of the town. The projector in Planetarian is based on the Zeiss Universal Mark II optical planetarium projector.) which is placed on a stage in front of the seats. The planetarium has electricity when the protagonist arrives, but only for a short time. Once a year, for 168 hours, electricity in the planetarium is operational, but the projector is broken. The rest of the floors in the department store are in ruins; mold and rats run rampant.

=== Characters ===
The Junker (屑屋, Kuzuya)
Voiced by: Daisuke Ono (Japanese); David Matranga (English)
The protagonist is a nameless soldier living the life of a "junker"—scavenging useful items among ruined cities to survive. He enters a derelict city searching for undamaged goods and finds an abandoned planetarium on the roof of a building he first thinks is a military facility. There, he meets Yumemi Hoshino, a gynoid designed to look like a young girl who annoys him greatly due to her constant talking. The protagonist has a tough personality that comes from trying to survive in a dystopic world. He carries a grenade launcher with him and covers himself with a waterproof coat to protect his skin from the toxic rain. For drinking water, his canteen has a water purifier that can purify the rain. He is constantly searching for rarer substances such as cigarettes and alcohol which can be sold at high prices.

Yumemi Hoshino (ほしのゆめみ, Hoshino Yumemi)
Voiced by: Keiko Suzuki (Japanese); Jill Harris (English)
Yumemi is a kindhearted but extremely talkative gynoid attendant of an abandoned planetarium; she is designed to look like a young girl. Yumemi is slightly damaged and completely unaware of the changes that have occurred in the past 30 years, as none of the facilities and databases that she connects to exist anymore. Therefore, she treats the protagonist like a regular guest by calling him "Mr. Customer" (お客様, Okyaku-sama), speaks of the world as it was before the war, and fails to understand any information he tells her, other than things related to her job at the planetarium. The name "Hoshino Yumemi" itself is a pun, and can be interpreted as "dreaming of a planet" (星の夢見, hoshi no yume-mi). Yumemi is the only character shown to the audience of the game.

Yumemi is very adamant about protecting humans and is happiest when she is helping those she serves. When she is unable to help someone, she gets terribly worried that she is incapable of offering assistance and must instead indirectly help a customer by directing him or her to someone who can. Protecting humans is her top priority and will even ignore previous orders to make sure no human is harmed when in her care.

=== Story ===
While dodging detection from war machines in a ruined city, the protagonist enters a building with a dome on the roof to search for usable supplies. Once inside the dome, he meets Yumemi, who offers to show him a special commemorative projection especially reserved for the 2,500,000th customer, although he is in fact the 2,497,290th customer. Despite his aggravation with her, he agrees to attend her show. However, the projector device, "Miss Jena", has broken down and is in need of repair. After he repairs it, Yumemi starts the show, presenting a projection of the starry sky, something that cannot be seen from the surface because of the polluted skies. The power goes out in the midst of the show, but Yumemi proceeds through the rest of the event with no visuals at the request of the protagonist.

Afterward, both of them leave the planetarium, as Yumemi insists on escorting him back to his vehicle outside the city walls. The protagonist plans to transport Yumemi out of the city after her battery runs out and find a way to reactivate her. A machine the protagonist calls a fiddler crab, due to its design, is guarding the entrance to the city in which he came from, and he devises a plan to destroy it armed with only a grenade launcher. After his initial plan fails and he is forced to face the machine front on, Yumemi tries to protect the protagonist, but is blown in half by the war machine's machine guns.

Yumemi spends her emergency battery life replaying her pre-war memories to the protagonist using a tiny holographic projector on her ear. When the video fades, she reveals that she had known that the planetarium would never have more customers during the 30 years she was alone, despite her apparent infinite optimism up to this point. In her final moment as she "dies" in front of him, Yumemi ejects the memory card from her artificial brain for his safekeeping. Touched and completely shaken by the loss of the beautiful world she left in his mind, he throws away his gun and puts the memory card in his coat, before wandering off with a broken leg as the fallen war machine's automated backup units are closing in on the scene.

== Development ==
Planetarian is Key's fourth visual novel, and had a small staff of three main people that did the majority of the work for the game's first release. Unlike previous Key titles, Planetarian's art director position was given to Eeji Komatsu instead of Itaru Hinoue who had held the position for the three previous games. Komatsu was chosen not only because of his specialty in depicting mechanics and robots, but also because he could represent short scenes which touch on a robot's existence to reproduce a person's ideals. Furthermore, Key was not short on staff at the time, and was not forced to outsource the artwork of Planetarian. Jun Maeda, Key's main scenario writer and project planner, was left out of the project, and Yūichi Suzumoto was given the position of planning and scenario. The music, excluding a single piece composed by Shinji Orito, was arranged or composed entirely by Magome Togoshi, one of Key's signature composers. Planetarian was the first game under the brand name KineticNovel to be described by the term "kinetic novel".

In the original version, Yumemi is only voiced during the beginning and ending scenes, while other characters are not voiced. When Planetarian was released for Windows PCs on CD-ROM, Yumemi had full voice acting. The PlayStation 2 (PS2) port offers full voice acting for the entire cast. Other changes to the PS2 version include a higher resolution for the computer graphics and an extended soundtrack. All other later versions contained full voice acting.

=== Music ===
The visual novel has one main theme song, the ending theme "Hoshi Meguri no Uta" (星めぐりの歌, Song of Circling Stars) sung by Mell of I've Sound, an arrangement of the folk song by Kenji Miyazawa. The Planetarian Original Soundtrack was released on August 11, 2006, at Comiket 70 by Key Sounds Label; it was later re-released on December 28, 2006. The soundtrack contains one disc with twelve tracks composed and produced by Magome Togoshi, and Shinji Orito; themes originally composed by Charles Crozat Converse and Miyazawa were remixed on the soundtrack. All of the tracks were arranged by Togoshi, except "Human Warrior" which was arranged by Orito. "Hoshi no Sekai (Opening)" (星の世界, World of Stars (Opening)) and "Itsukushimi Fukaki" (慈しみ深き, Deep Affection) are rearrangements of the hymn "What a Friend We Have in Jesus" by Converse, and their titles reflect this as well: "Hoshi no Sekai" refers to the Japanese version of the hymn named "Hoshinoyo", and "Itsukushimi Fukaki" is the Japanese translation of the hymn's original title.

=== Release history ===
Planetarian was released on November 29, 2004, via download over the Internet playable on Windows PCs, and was first made available only to Yahoo! Japan Broadband users. The game was opened up for general sale on December 6, 2004. Key released a CD-ROM version for Windows PCs on April 28, 2006, in limited and regular editions. An updated version of Planetarian compatible for Windows Vista PCs was released by Key on July 31, 2009, in a box set containing five other Key visual novels called Key 10th Memorial Box. Another updated version compatible for Windows 7 PCs called Planetarian: The Reverie of a Little Planet Memorial Edition was released on April 30, 2010. The Memorial Edition also came bundled with the three previously released Planetarian drama CDs. An HD edition for Windows was released on July 29, 2016. Planetarian was released on Steam by Sekai Project in English for Windows on September 12, 2014, with later support planned for macOS and Linux devices. The Steam release was updated on September 17, 2014, to allow the user to switch to the original Japanese version of the game. An English version of the HD edition was released on September 19, 2022.

A consumer console port of the game was released for the PS2 on August 24, 2006, by Prototype. A version playable on FOMA and SoftBank 3G mobile phones was released by Prototype through Visual Arts Motto on November 28, 2006. A limited-edition version of Planetarian developed by Prototype playable on the PlayStation Portable (PSP) was available for purchase between February 28 and March 1, 2009, at Key 10th Memorial Fes, an event held in commemoration of Key's ten-year anniversary. A downloadable version of the PSP release via the PlayStation Store was released by Prototype on August 24, 2009. Prototype again sold the PSP version at their Prototype Fan Appreciation 2010 event on May 30, 2010. The PSP version was re-released on May 12, 2011, as a fundraising release for the 2011 Tōhoku earthquake and tsunami. A mobile app version playable on Android and iOS devices was released on November 30, 2011. An updated iOS version released in January 2013 includes support for English readers. Prototype released a Nintendo Switch version on January 31, 2019, with its physical release on June 27, 2024, making this its first English physical release, bundled with Snow Globe.

=== Snow Globe ===
Visual Arts launched a crowdfunding campaign on November 29, 2019, to produce an original video animation (OVA) episode titled Planetarian: Snow Globe. By the end of the campaign, the final stretch goal had been achieved for Key to produce a kinetic novel version of Planetarian: Snow Globe for Windows. Snow Globe, a prequel, was released on September 3, 2021 with the Planetarian Ultimate Edition that also included a re-release of the 2016 HD edition of Planetarian: The Reverie of a Little Planet for Windows, the three previously released drama CDs, and an art book. A downloadable edition of Snow Globe for Windows was also released at the same time. The staff for Snow Globe was the same for The Reverie of a Little Planet with the scenario written by Yūichi Suzumoto and the art by Eeji Komatsu. The music in the game is from the Snow Globe OVA released as Planetarian: Snow Globe Original Sound Tracks & Voice Drama CD in January 2021 for backers of the crowdfunding campaign who pledged at least ¥13,640. The Snow Globe soundtrack is composed by Shinji Orito, Donmaru and Ryō Mizutsuki. It was released on Steam on April 30, 2024, and later on Nintendo Switch on June 27, with English, French and Chinese translations.

== Adaptations ==
- Planetarian: The Reverie of a Little Planet

planetarian ～ちいさなほしのゆめ～ (Planetarian: Chiisana Hoshi no Yume)
- Genre: Drama, post-apocalyptic
- Light novel
- Written by: Yūichi Suzumoto
- Illustrated by: Eeji Komatsu
- Published by: Visual Arts
- Imprint: VA Bunko
- Published: April 28, 2006
- Original net animation
- Directed by: Naokatsu Tsuda
- Written by: Naokatsu Tsuda; Shogo Yasukawa
- Music by: Magome Togoshi; Shinji Orito; Donmaru; Tomohiro Takeshita
- Studio: David Production
- Licensed by: NA: Crunchyroll
- Released: July 7, 2016 – August 4, 2016
- Runtime: 14–24 minutes each
- Episodes: 5
- Original net animation

Planetarian: Snow Globe
- Directed by: Jin Tamamura
- Written by: Shogo Yasukawa
- Studio: Okuruto Noboru
- Released: August 25, 2021
- Runtime: 36 minutes
- Film
- Planetarian: Storyteller of the Stars

=== Light novel ===
A light novel featuring a collection of four illustrated short stories, including a prologue and an epilogue, and based on Planetarian's story were written by Yūichi Suzumoto and illustrated by Eeji Komatsu. The 243-page novel was originally bundled with the limited edition of the CD version of Planetarian, and was also included in the limited edition of the PlayStation 2 version. The book was re-published as a commercial release by Visual Arts under their VA Bunko light novel imprint on October 31, 2008, and was the second title on the imprint. A downloadable version of the novel titled Hoshi no Hito: Planetarian Side Story on Android devices was released on November 30, 2011, followed by a version on iOS devices on December 14, 2011. The first two stories presented occur before the events of the kinetic novel, and the latter two occur during its aftermath. The front matter of the book reads, "Starry sky, words, God, robots. A collection of short stories in the key of these four themes." A short preview of the book is available online.

Snow Globe (雪圏球, Sunō Gurōbu)
This story occurs before the events of the war that brought the world to ruin; at this point, Yumemi has been working at the Flowercrest Department Store's rooftop planetarium for about ten years. One day, Yumemi begins to act strangely, culminating in her simply walking out and wandering around the town. The staff of the planetarium are bewildered, and one of the workers—a woman named Satomi Kurahashi—is ordered to go follow Yumemi and bring her back. Before long, Yumemi begins to run out of battery power.

Jerusalem (エルサレム, Erusaremu)
This story occurs as the war reaches its height. The South American Unification Army receives reports of a rogue sniper operating deep in the jungles of Patagonia, and sends a platoon under the command of Master Sergeant Murdock to neutralize the threat. However, the entire platoon is killed off one by one by the sniper, until only Murdock is left. All alone, Murdock catches a glimpse of this mysterious sniper through his binoculars—and is shocked to find that he gazes upon the figure of a beautiful nun.

Man of the Stars (星の人, Hoshi no Hito)
This story occurs some time after the events of the kinetic novel, as human civilization struggles in a losing battle against the poisonous rain. Three of the last inhabitants of a nearly abandoned underground fallout shelter—named Levi, Ruth, and Job—find a quaint old man collapsed in the snow outside the bunker. When they bring him down, they are surprised to hear the adults calling him "Man of the Stars". The children grow quite interested about his strange nickname, as well as the fact that they have never seen a visitor from the outside world. The old man recovers a bit and has the children help him in putting together a portable planetarium projector. This story offers an ultimate conclusion to the story in the kinetic novel.

Tircis and Aminte (チルシスとアマント, Chirushisu to Amanto)
Identical twins Tircis and Aminte study alone in a world of their own. Tircis begins to wonder why he is studying and how long will it go on. This is the story of how the answer reveals itself to Tircis and Aminte.

=== Drama CDs ===
Cast
Drama CD	Voice actor	Role
Snow Globe	Keiko Suzuki	Yumemi Hoshino (ほしのゆめみ, Hoshino Yumemi)
Snow Globe	Akaru Mizuki	Satomi Kurahashi (倉橋里美, Kurahashi Satomi)
Snow Globe	Asahi Morishōji	Gorō Mikajima (三ヶ島吾朗, Mikajima Gorō)
Snow Globe	Yumi Hisako	Yuka Morimi (森見由香, Morimi Yuka)
Snow Globe	Yū Watanabe	Akane Koga (古賀茜, Koga Akane)
Jerusalem	Akio Ōtsuka	Maddock (マードック, Mādokku)
Jerusalem	Akira Ishida	David Salinger (デイビッド・サリンジャー, Deibiddo Sarinja)
Jerusalem	Yuki Masuda	Sister (シスター, Shisutā)
Jerusalem	Keijin Okuda	Manson (マンソン)
Jerusalem	Yasumichi Kushida	Gwen Chow (グエン・チャウ, Guen Chau)
Jerusalem	Daisuke Endō	Daniel Dias (ダニエル・ディアス, Danieru Diasu)
Man of the Stars	Asuka Tanii	Levi (レビ, Rebi)
Man of the Stars	Yuka Nishigaki	Job (ヨブ, Yobu)
Man of the Stars	Yuki Matsuoka	Ruth (ルツ, Rutsu)
Man of the Stars	Masashi Hirose	Old man (老人, Rōjin)
Man of the Stars	Hitomi Oikawa	Ezra (エズラ, Ezura)
Man of the Stars	Masayo Hosono	Jeremiah (エレミヤ, Eremiya)
Man of the Stars	Tomoka Sakai	Villager 1 (村人1, Murabito 1)
Man of the Stars	Sami Wakima	Villager 2 (村人2, Murabito 2)
Man of the Stars	Keiko Suzuki	Yumemi Hoshino (ほしのゆめみ, Hoshino Yumemi)
Man of the Stars	Daisuke Ono	The junker (屑屋, Kuzuya)

Three drama CDs were released by Key Sounds Label based on the short stories in the light novel. The first, Snow Globe, was released on December 29, 2006 at Comiket 71 bearing the catalog number KSLA-0027; it was later re-released on May 25, 2007 with a different cover. The opening track takes place one year before the protagonist arrives at the planetarium and the "Snow Globe" story is told as a flashback. The end of the drama CD is where the kinetic novel begins. The second drama CD, Jerusalem, was released on July 27, 2007 bearing the catalog number KSLA-0029. The insert song "Brave New World" by fripSide is included at the end of the drama CD. The final drama CD, Hoshi no Hito, was released on July 27, 2007 bearing the catalog numbers KSLA-0030–0031. This drama CD covers both the Man of the Stars" and "Tircis and Aminte" stories. A cast of voice actors perform the characters in "Man of the Stars", but "Tircis and Aminte" is a recited story by Keiko Suzuki, the voice of Yumemi Hoshino.

Drama CD 1: Snow Globe
No.	Title	Length
1.	"28-nen to 87-nichi" (28年と87日 28th Year and 87th Day)	3:43
2.	"Bug" (バグ Bagu)	5:48
3.	"Nichijō" (日常 Ordinary)	6:37
4.	"Dassō" (脱走 Escape)	9:00
5.	"Kawaru Mono, Kawaranai Mono" (変わる物、変わらない物 Things Change, Things Remain)	7:58
6.	"Snow Globe" (雪圏球(スノーグローブ) Sunō Gurōbu)	7:17
7.	"29-nen to 81-nichi" (29年と81日 29th Year and 81st Day)	10:47
Total length:		51:10

Drama CD 2: Jerusalem
No.	Title	Length
1.	"Kanenone to Jūsei to" (鐘の音と銃声と Chimes and Gunshots)	2:33
2.	"Shōrō Sniper" (鐘楼の狙撃手 Bell Tower Sniper)	6:28
3.	"Mission Complete..." (作戦終了 Misshon Konpurīto)	10:07
4.	"Sister" (修道女 Shisutā)	7:40
5.	"Kami no Kuni" (神の国 The Country of God)	11:50
6.	"Gōka" (業火 Hell Fire)	9:09
7.	"Kanenone to Shokuzai to" (鐘の音と贖罪と Chimes and Atonement)	14:30
Total length:		62:17

Drama CD 3: Man of the Stars
No.	Title	Length
1.	"Levi to Job to Ruth" (レビとヨブとルツ Rebi to Yobu to Rutsu)	3:13
2.	"Raihōsha" (来訪者 Visitor)	8:20
3.	"Natsukashiki Hibi" (懐かしき日々 Nostalgic Days)	15:57
4.	"Tōei Kashi" (投影開始 Projection Commencement)	15:45
5.	"Takaramono" (宝物 Treasure)	6:58
6.	"Megami" (女神 Goddess)	7:37
7.	"Hoshi no Hito" (星の人 Man of the Stars)	18:45
Total length:		76:35

Drama CD 3: Tircis and Aminte
No.	Title	Length
1.	"Tircis to Aminte" (チルシスとアマント Tircis and Aminte)	5:16
2.	"Tircis to Aminte" (チルシスとアマント Tircis and Aminte)	8:26
3.	"Tircis to Aminte" (チルシスとアマント Tircis and Aminte)	7:12
4.	"Tircis to Aminte" (チルシスとアマント Tircis and Aminte)	5:21
5.	"Tircis to Aminte" (チルシスとアマント Tircis and Aminte)	5:32
6.	"Tircis to Aminte" (チルシスとアマント Tircis and Aminte)	10:22
7.	"Tircis to Aminte" (チルシスとアマント Tircis and Aminte)	8:40
Total length:		50:49

=== Anime ===
A five-episode original net animation (ONA) adaptation was produced by David Production and directed by Naokatsu Tsuda. The series was streamed on Niconico and other online services from July 7 to August 4, 2016. The screenplay is written by Tsuda and Shogo Yasukawa. Hitomi Takechi based the character design used in the anime on Eeji Komatsu's original designs. Sound and music direction is headed by Tsuda and Takayuki Yamaguchi. Katsuichi Nakayama and Shunsuke Machitani are the series directors. The anime's music is composed by Magome Togoshi, Shinji Orito, Donmaru and Tomohiro Takeshita. The main ending theme of the ONA series is "Twinkle Starlight" by Sayaka Sasaki. A single titled "Twinkle Starlight / Worlds Pain" performed by Sasaki and Ceui was released on July 27, 2016. "Hoshi Meguri no Uta" by Mell from the visual novel was used for the ending theme of episode five. The series was released on a single Blu-ray compilation volume on September 28, 2016.

The same staff also produced an anime film titled Planetarian: Storyteller of the Stars that premiered in Japanese theaters on September 3, 2016. Funimation simulcasted the ONA series on their website, and later released the ONA series and film on physical media on August 14, 2018.

Visual Arts launched a crowdfunding campaign on November 29, 2019, to produce an original video animation (OVA) episode titled Planetarian: Snow Globe. The OVA was animated by Okuruto Noboru and directed by Jin Tamamura, with Yasukawa returning to write the screenplay and Takechi returning to design the characters. People who backed the campaign received a copy of the OVA on Blu-ray in January 2021, and it was released to the general public on August 25, 2021.

No.	Title (Note: All English titles are taken from Funimation.)	Original air date
1	"The Robot's Bouquet"; Transliteration: "Robotto no Hanataba" (Japanese: ロボットの花束)	July 7, 2016
A man living the life of a "junker"—scavenging useful items among ruined cities to survive—enters a derelict city only to be chased by automated anti-personnel machines. He takes refuge in a former department store building and finds that it still has working electricity. On the top floor, the junker is greeted by Yumemi Hoshino, the friendly gynoid attendant of the department store's planetarium. Yumemi treats the junker as a customer and repeatedly implores him to watch a special presentation reserved for the 2,500,000th customer, but the projector is in need of repair. The junker attempts to leave the following day, but he has second thoughts after talking with Yumemi.
2	"Repairing the Projector"; Transliteration: "Tōeiki Shūri" (Japanese: 投影機修理)	July 14, 2016
The junker returns to the planetarium and begins repairs on the projector. Yumemi tells him that she has been in energy-saving mode for the past 30 years and is only active for one week in a year. Yumemi helps with the repairs by testing spare light bulbs for the projector. The junker brings up the subject of God, and suggests that Yumemi pray to the god of robots for the projector to get fixed sooner. Although Yumemi has no knowledge of a god of robots, she shows the junker a related holographic recording of her talking to the planetarium staff about a heaven for robots. The next day, the junker completes his repairs to the projector.
3	"Yumemi's Projection"; Transliteration: "Yumemi no Tōei" (Japanese: ゆめみの投影)	July 21, 2016
Yumemi begins the projection, but just as the special presentation is about to start, the power goes out. The junker discovers that the electrical power that had been running to the building has now permanently shut off. However, the junker tells Yumemi to continue the presentation with only her explanations. Following the presentation, the junker goes to leave the planetarium, but Yumemi is concerned over the junker's return home. He tells her he has a car not far from the planetarium, so she offers to escort him.
4	"Drunk with Alcohol"; Transliteration: "Sake ni You" (Japanese: 酒に酔う)	July 28, 2016
The junker and Yumemi begin their trek through the ruined city, but are forced to take frequent stops to allow Yumemi's overheated components to cool. They come across a liquor store, and the junker finds a lone unbroken bottle of Scotch whisky inside. Close to the edge of the city, the junker sees a large search and destroy robot. The junker implores Yumemi to leave the city with him, but Yumemi cannot comprehend everything the junker is telling her about the abandoned city. Before he leaves to destroy the robot, the junker tells her to think over his offer and stay put. The junker fires a grenade launcher at the robot, but the grenade misfires, causing the robot to retaliate with a railgun.
5	"Yumemi's Wish"; Transliteration: "Yumemi no Negai" (Japanese: ゆめみの願い)	August 4, 2016
The junker survives the attack and manages to hit it on his second attempt, but the robot continues to attack. Yumemi tries to intercede, but the robot blows her in half while the junker successfully disables the robot. Yumemi uses some of her emergency battery life replaying some of her memories from the planetarium using a holographic projector. The junker tells her that he had come to the city to take her to her new workplace where she can serve new customers forever. Assuming him to be the god of robots, Yumemi asks him not to split up heaven so that she may always serve humans. After Yumemi's batteries are depleted, the junker takes the memory card with all of her memories and exits the city. The junker is found by three other junkers collapsed outside the city walls, but he tells them that he is a starteller.

== Reception ==
In a review by Marcus Estrada of Hardcore Gamer, he praised Planetarian for having a "beautiful story," gorgeous CGs and a soundtrack that "sets a melancholic, but hopeful mood fitting with the story." He also noted that "even as an aging property Planetarian still looks and sounds good." Planetarian is one of several kinetic novels featured in the Lycèe Trading Card Game; Yumemi and the planetarium are playable cards in the second Visual Arts card set. In the February 2007 issue of SoftBank Creative's Gemaga magazine, the PS2 version ranked first for console games in terms of satisfaction; the game had ranked fourth in the previous issue. In the Japanese video game magazine Famitsu released on September 8, 2006, it was reported that the PS2 version of Planetarian sold 8,170 units the week of August 21 to August 27, 2006 (the PS2 version was originally sold on August 24, 2006). When the PSP version was re-released as a fundraising event for the 2011 Tōhoku earthquake and tsunami, 16,663 units were pre-ordered by the day of its release on May 12, 2011. From these sales, Prototype and Visual Arts donated 22,415,069 yen.

== See also ==
- Three Laws of Robotics
