= Tori no Uta =

Song by Lia

from the album Ornithopter
- Released: September 8, 2000
- Recorded: May 3–5, 2000
- Studio: Paramount Studio, Los Angeles
- Genre: Electronica; J-pop; new-age; trance; video game music
- Length: 6:08
- Label: Key Sounds Label
- Composer: Shinji Orito
- Lyricist: Jun Maeda
- Producer: Kazuya Takase

"Tori no Uta" (鳥の詩; lit. 'Bird's Poem') is a Japanese trance song sung by Lia, written by Jun Maeda, composed by Shinji Orito, and arranged by Kazuya Takase. The song was recorded at Paramount Studio in Los Angeles by the visual novel studio Key through their record label Key Sounds Label for use as the opening theme of Key's 2000 visual novel Air.

A short version of the song was first released on I've Sound's July 2000 compilation album Verge. The full version of "Tori no Uta" first appeared on the limited edition remix album Ornithopter (September 2000) originally bundled with the first printing release of the Air game, though "Tori no Uta" was not remixed on the album. The song was later widely distributed on the Air Original Soundtrack (2002), the soundtrack of the visual novel. The song was later featured as the opening theme to the Air anime series in 2005. The Japanese variety radio show Moteken used "Tori no Uta" as the ending theme to their October 15, 2007 broadcast.

== Composition ==
Tori no Uta
A sample from the intro of "Tori no Uta"

"Tori no Uta" is the longest track featured in Air, spanning 6:08 minutes. "Tori no Uta" is a trance song in common time which begins in the B minor key and waits until the eighth measure for Lia to begin singing. The song moves at 122 beats per minute, and Lia's vocal range spans almost two octaves from F♯_{4} to D_{6}. The song's instrumentation primarily uses a synthesizer as a base, but does include a short piano sequence lasting for the first eight measures, along with piano accompaniment throughout the song.

Example of the first key shift from B minor to G♯ minor between measures 26 and 27.

The song is kept in B minor for the first verse, shifts to G♯ minor for the second, and again shifts to the previous key's supertonic, A♯ minor (or enharmonically B♭ minor) for the third, then after a brief modulation to C♯ minor, continues into the first measure of the fourth verse where it shifts back to B minor for the rest of the verse. After a short break, the key goes back to G-sharp minor and continues the same pattern as before. At the end of this sequence in verse seven, the first verse is repeated as the sole chorus in B minor. An instrumental coda is used to close the song which lasts for about one-sixth of the entire piece's length.

Shinji Orito commented on the song in the Air Original Soundtrack booklet where he remarked, "Even though I have made up my mind that the song "Tori no Uta" best captures the themes of Air, arriving at this was extremely difficult. Besides being under a lot of pressure, I'm still quite inexperienced in the field of music; this is the area I want to become stronger in most of all."

== Release history ==
"Tori no Uta" has been released many times in original and remix versions. The song was first released as a shortened version spanning 3:09 minutes on I've Sound's July 2000 compilation album Verge. The first release of the song on Key Sounds Label, the record label affiliated with Key, was on the 2001 album Humanity... as a remix version subtitled "Bossanova version" and was sung by Mina Minomo. The full-length original version of the song was first released on the limited edition remix album Ornithopter (September 2000) originally bundled with the first printing release of the Air game. The song was later widely distributed on the Air Original Soundtrack (2002), the soundtrack of the visual novel, in original, short, and instrumental versions.

An instrumental piano version of "Tori no Uta" was released on the album Re-feel (2003) by Key Sounds Label. A remixed version arranged by Cosmic Seekers was included on the albums Air Analog Collector's Edition, and OTSU Club Music Compilation Vol.1, both released by Key Sounds Label in 2006. Another instrumental piano version was released on the album Key 10th Memorial Score, and a remixed version arranged by Blasterhead was included on the album OTSU:Blasterhead, both released by Key Sounds Label in 2009. The song was included on two remix albums released by Key Sounds Label in July 2012: Keynote remixed by Sōshi Hosoi, VisualArt's 20th Anniversary Remixes remixed by PandaBoY. A re-arranged version of the song was released on Shinji Orito's album Circle of Fifth in October 2012. A classical music version was released on the remix album Key Classic in December 2012 by Key Sounds Label.

Live versions of the song have appeared on two live albums by Lia. The first was the June 2005 DVD album Prologue featuring tracks performed at Lia's concert of the same name in Shibuya, Japan in January 2005. The second was the June 2008 DVD album The Limited featuring tracks performed at Lia's concert at Zepp Tokyo in September 2007; this album also contained a bonus track of "Tori no Uta" subtitled "[Double Encore]". Another live version appeared on Key Sound Label's KSL Live World 2008: Way to the Little Busters! EX live album featuring tracks performed at the second KSL Live World 2008 concert held in Osaka, Japan in May 2008. Later, a live version appeared on Key Sound Label's KSL Live World 2010: Way to the Kud Wafter live album featuring tracks performed at one of the May 22, 2010 KSL Live World 2010 concerts held in Tokyo.

== Legacy ==
In Japan and the Chinese community, "Tori no Uta" has been referred as the "National Anthem" of ACG.

=== Remixes and samples ===
"Tori no Uta" launched a music career for Lia, and the song has appeared on many of her albums. The first was a remix on her first independent album Prismatic (2004); the song carried the subtitle "2004 summer version: Relaxin' with lovers mix", and later appeared on Lia's best of album Crystal Voice (2007). The original version appeared on Lia's best of album Diamond Days (2007), and a remix version by StripE subtitled "StripE REMIX" was included on her best of album Spectrum Rays (2007). A new vocal recording of "Tori no Uta" was released on Lia's Enigmatic LIA 2 album in early 2007, and another remix by DJ Sharpnel subtitled "[the speed freak's noise rave remix]" was released on Lia's Enigmatic LIA 3 album in early 2009.

"Tori no Uta" was sampled for the second movement of a symphony on the bonus CD Shinwa e no Izanai released with the special edition DVD version of the Air film in August 2005. A cover version of the song, sung by Asami Imai, was released on a two-disc music album and audio drama entitled Your Song. The album was released in January 2007 by Namco Bandai Games for their video game The Idolmaster; Imai is the voice of Chihaya Kisaragi from The Idolmaster. The cover version was re-released in August 2007 on an image song and audio drama CD entitled The Idolmaster Master Artist 05 Chihaya Kisaragi featuring songs sung by Imai. Another cover version, sung by Masaaki Endoh, was released on Endoh's anime song cover album Enson2: Cover Songs Collection Vol.2 sold in December 2008. A cover version of "Tori no Uta" appeared in the sequel of Front Wing's visual novel Time Leap titled Time Leap Paradise released in July 2009. Another cover version by Chihiro Yonekura appeared on her 2011 cover album Nakeru Anison. A cover version was released in January 2012 as an official demo for the Vocaloid 3 product IA: Aria on the Planetes; Lia is the voice provider of IA. "Tori no Uta"'s melody has also appeared in two of the medleys in Kumikyoku Nico Nico Douga. A portion of "Tori no Uta," sung by Nikki, is present in the Chinese hip-hop song "Looking Back" by Yin Ts'ang. Hiroko Moriguchi covered the song on her 2024 album Anison Covers 2.

== Shaun Yu plagiarism ==
"Melody"
Soundbite of a plagiarizing section in "Melody" by Shaun Yu.

On August 27, 2005, Anime News Network reported that Singaporean musician Shaun Yu may have plagiarized "Tori no Uta". Yu's current album, The Best of Shaun Yu, features a track called "Melody" which sounds like the Air theme. Though Key made no official statement at the time, an investigation was initiated.

On September 21, 2005, it was reported that a second song on The Best of Shaun Yu may have been plagiarized from a song composed by Hiroyuki Tōshima, "Tenshi no Kyujitsu". Yu had stated that his producers, YesMusic, had arranged both tracks, and that he was unaware of the situation. YesMusic, in turn, had stated that it licensed the rights to the song from Key/VisualArt's for mainland China distribution, but that the album came out in Taiwan before licensing could be arranged for that territory. However, Key/VisualArt's denied this, as per a statement on Key's website:

Official Announcement Regarding Plagiarism of "Tori no Uta":

Thank you very much for supporting products of our humble company. According to information provided by fans, we've learned that Shaun Yu's The Best of Shaun Yu (真愛珍愛2005風行精選集) distributed by Sony BMG Entertainment (Taiwan) is suspected plagiarizing our music—"Tori no Uta". We apologize for worrying supporting fans. We have filed a formal complaint to Sony BMG Entertainment and made following demands:

- Apologize publicly on the web.
- Credit the composer of "Tori no Uta" to Shinji Orito clearly.
- If the above two requirements are fulfilled, we will not ask for financial compensations.

We have been negotiating with Sony BMG Entertainment (Taiwan) with those terms. Regrettably, Tommy Chi, director of YesMusic, the production company of this CD, has made a false announcement today that he had purchased distribution rights from us. It is a pity and is regrettable. In order to show our objection to his plagiarizing actions and his dishonest attitude, we shall not license any of our creation to them, including Tori no Uta. These days, we have received supports from both Japanese and Taiwanese fans. You have our immense gratitude. Please keep supporting our humble company, Key, in the future.

Translation from Anime News Network, not the official website.

On September 29, 2005, Sony BMG Taiwan posted a statement of apology in both Chinese and Japanese on their official website. CD shipments were cancelled and recalled.
