= Music of Air =

Music from the visual novel Air

Air discography
- Extended plays: 1
- Soundtrack albums: 2
- Singles: 1
- Remixes: 4

Air is a visual novel developed by Key and published by Visual Arts in 2000. The story follows Yukito Kunisaki, a traveler who arrives in a quiet seaside town during the summer and is on a search for the "girl in the sky" that his now-deceased mother told him about and was searching for too. In town, Yukito meets three strange girls, and Yukito begins to suspect that one of them may in fact be the girl he has been searching for. It was adapted by Toei Animation into an animated film in 2005 directed by Osamu Dezaki with music direction by Yoshikazu Suo. Kyoto Animation also adapted it into a 13-episode anime television series broadcast in 2005, along with an additional two episodes also broadcast in 2005, directed by Tatsuya Ishihara with music direction by Shinji Orito. The discography of Air and its anime adaptations consists of one EP, one single, two soundtracks, and three remix albums.

The core of the discography is the two original soundtrack albums. The visual novel's soundtrack, which was also used for the anime series, was produced by Key Sounds Label and released in 2002. The music on the soundtrack was composed and arranged by Jun Maeda, Shinji Orito, and Magome Togoshi. A soundtrack for the animated film was released in 2005 by Frontier Works. The music on the film soundtrack was mainly composed and arranged by Yoshikazu Suo. Three remix albums were released for the visual novel in 2000, 2003, and 2020, and a remix album was released for the film in 2005. A single for the visual novel was released in 2001 containing a vocal version of a background music track from the game. An EP for the visual novel was released in 2006 covering the three pieces of theme music used in the game as well as two remix versions of the opening and ending themes.

== Albums ==
=== Ornithopter ===
Ornithopter is an arrange album released by Key for the Air visual novel, and was packaged with the first edition of the Air visual novel released on September 8, 2000, bearing the catalog number KYCD-0303. Seven of the ten tracks on the album are arrange versions of background music featured in the visual novel, with the other three being the original versions of the game's three main theme songs "Tori no Uta", "Farewell song", and "Aozora". The seven background tracks were arranged by several people including Shinji Orito, Magome Togoshi, OdiakeS, and Kazuya Takase of I've Sound. The title of the album comes from ornithopter, an aircraft that flies by flapping its wings.

Track listing
No.	Title	Music	Arrangement	Length
1.	"Tentōmushi" (てんとう虫 Ladybug)	Magome Togoshi	Kazuya Takase (I've Sound)	5:21
2.	"Tori no Uta" (鳥の詩 Bird's Poem) (Lyrics by Jun Maeda; Performed by Lia)	Shinji Orito	Kazuya Takase (I've Sound)	6:07
3.	"Sōsei" (双星 Twin Stars)	Magome Togoshi	Wakana	5:20
4.	"Hanemizu" (跳ね水 Splashing Water)	Shinji Orito	Magome Togoshi	4:45
5.	"Yasō" (夜想 Nocturne)	Magome Togoshi	Shinji Orito	4:14
6.	"Yumegatari" (夢語り Dream-telling)	Shinji Orito	Natsumi Waro	3:40
7.	"Natsukage" (夏影 Summer Lights)	Jun Maeda	OdiakeS	3:17
8.	"Niji" (虹 Rainbows)	Magome Togoshi	VWN	3:25
9.	"Aozora" (青空 Blue Skies) (Lyrics by Jun Maeda; Performed by Lia)	Jun Maeda	Shinji Orito	5:32
10.	"Farewell song" (Lyrics by Jun Maeda; Performed by Lia)	Magome Togoshi	Magome Togoshi	5:27
Total length:				47:13

=== Air Original Soundtrack ===
The Air Original Soundtrack, from the visual novel Air, was first released on September 27, 2002, in Japan by Key Sounds Label bearing the catalog numbers KSLA-0004—0005. The soundtrack contains two discs totaling thirty-seven songs composed, arranged, and produced by Jun Maeda, Shinji Orito, Magome Togoshi, and Kazuya Takase of I've Sound. Lia provides vocals for three songs, "Tori no Uta", "Farewell song", and "Aozora".

Disc 1
No.	Title	Music	Length
1.	"Kaisōroku" (回想録 Reminiscence)	Magome Togoshi	1:28
2.	"Nomichi" (野道 Path in a Field)	Shinji Orito	3:20
3.	"Tori no Uta" (鳥の詩 Bird's Poem) (Lyrics by Jun Maeda; Arrangement by Kazuya Takase (I've Sound); Performed by Lia)	Shinji Orito	6:08
4.	"Natsukage" (夏影 Summer Lights)	Jun Maeda	2:58
5.	"Hanemizu" (跳ね水 Splashing Water)	Shinji Orito	1:13
6.	"Mizutamari" (水たまり Puddle)	Shinji Orito	3:59
7.	"Yumegatari" (夢語り Dream-telling)	Shinji Orito	2:19
8.	"Niji" (虹 Rainbows)	Magome Togoshi	1:48
9.	"Tentōmushi" (てんとう虫 Ladybug)	Magome Togoshi	1:53
10.	"Denshō" (伝承 Legend)	Magome Togoshi	1:44
11.	"Kawa" (川 River)	Shinji Orito	3:11
12.	"Esoragoto" (絵空事 Fabrication)	Shinji Orito	3:02
13.	"Sōsei" (双星 Twin Stars)	Magome Togoshi	3:37
14.	"Kotowari" (理 Reason)	Magome Togoshi	3:32
15.	"Enishi" (縁 Fate)	Shinji Orito	2:23
16.	"Semigoromo" (蝉衣 Thin Clothes)	Magome Togoshi	1:43
17.	"Kannagi" (神薙 Dissidents)	Shinji Orito	2:43
18.	"Tsukiwarawa" (月童 Moon Child)	Magome Togoshi	3:33
19.	"Gin'iro (orgel version)" (銀色 Silver)	Jun Maeda	1:07
20.	"Futari" (ふたり Two People)	Shinji Orito	2:31
21.	"Koko" (此処 This Place)	Magome Togoshi	2:32
22.	"Gin'iro" (銀色 Silver)	Jun Maeda	1:53
23.	"Aozora" (青空 Blue Skies) (Lyrics by Jun Maeda; Arrangement by Shinji Orito; Performed by Lia)	Jun Maeda	4:19
24.	"Hane" (羽根 Wing)	Shinji Orito	3:27
25.	"Yasō" (夜想 Nocturne)	Magome Togoshi	1:53
26.	"Farewell song" (Lyrics by Jun Maeda; Arrangement by Magome Togoshi; Performed by Lia)	Magome Togoshi	5:32

Disc 2
No.	Title	Music	Length
1.	"Tori no Uta (short version)" (鳥の詩 Bird's Poem) (Lyrics by Jun Maeda; Arrangement by Kazuya Takase (I've Sound); Performed by Lia)	Shinji Orito	3:09
2.	"Farewell song (short version)" (Lyrics by Jun Maeda; Arrangement by Magome Togoshi; Performed by Lia)	Magome Togoshi	2:40
3.	"Farewell song (dream version)" (Arrangement by Magome Togoshi)	Magome Togoshi	2:41
4.	"Mishiyō Kyoku 1" (未使用曲 Unused Track)	Magome Togoshi	2:03
5.	"Mishiyō Kyoku 2" (未使用曲 Unused Track)	Magome Togoshi	1:54
6.	"Mishiyō Kyoku 3" (未使用曲 Unused Track)	Magome Togoshi	3:32
7.	"Mishiyō Kyoku 4" (未使用曲 Unused Track)	Magome Togoshi	1:57
8.	"Mishiyō Kyoku 5" (未使用曲 Unused Track)	Shinji Orito	2:27
9.	"Mishiyō Kyoku 6" (未使用曲 Unused Track)	Magome Togoshi	2:24
10.	"Tori no Uta (off vocal)" (鳥の詩 Bird's Poem) (Arrangement by Kazuya Takase (I've Sound))	Shinji Orito	6:09
11.	"Farewell song (off vocal)" (Arrangement by Magome Togoshi)	Magome Togoshi	5:34
Total length:			108:22

=== Re-feel ===
Re-feel is a piano arrange album with songs taken from the Kanon and Air visual novels and arranged into piano versions. It was first released on December 28, 2003, at Comiket 65 in Japan by Key Sounds Label bearing the catalog number KSLA-0010. The album contains one disc with ten tracks; the first five songs are from Kanon while the last five are from Air. With the exception of track two which is arranged by Riya of Eufonius, all the tracks are arranged by Ryō Mizutsuki, who is credited as Kiyo on the album.

Track listing
No.	Title	Music	Arrangement	Length
1.	"Yakusoku" (約束 Promise)	Shinji Orito	Ryō Mizutsuki	4:01
2.	"Shōjo no Ori" (少女の檻 Girls' Prison)	OdiakeS	Riya	4:18
3.	"Pure Snows"	Shinji Orito	Ryō Mizutsuki	3:39
4.	"Yume no Ato" (夢の跡 Remnants of a Dream)	Jun Maeda	Riya	3:24
5.	"Zankō" (残光 Afterglow)	Jun Maeda	Ryō Mizutsuki	4:14
6.	"Natsukage" (夏影 Summer Lights)	Jun Maeda	Ryō Mizutsuki	3:16
7.	"Denshō" (伝承 Legend)	Magome Togoshi	Ryō Mizutsuki	4:18
8.	"Aozora" (青空 Blue Skies)	Jun Maeda	Ryō Mizutsuki	5:33
9.	"Yumegatari" (夢語り Dream-telling)	Shinji Orito	Ryō Mizutsuki	4:39
10.	"Tori no Uta" (鳥の詩 Bird's Poem)	Shinji Orito	Ryō Mizutsuki	4:11
Total length:				41:33

=== Air Analog Collector's Edition ===
Air Analog Collector's Edition: Tori no Uta / Farewell song (Air アナログコレクターズエディション 『鳥の詩 / Farewell song』, Air Anarogu Korekutāzu Edishon Tori no Uta/Farewell song) is an EP released on a gramophone record for the Air visual novel, which went on sale on May 3, 2006, in Japan by Key Sounds Label bearing the catalog number KSLA-0022. The EP features the three theme songs from the visual novel in regular versions on the A-side, and remix versions of "Tori no Uta" and "Farewell song" on the B-side. The B-side tracks were later featured on the OTSU Club Music Compilation Vol.1 album by Key Sounds Label. All songs on the EP are performed by Lia.

All lyrics are written by Jun Maeda.

Side A
No.	Title	Music	Arrangement	Length
1.	"Tori no Uta" (鳥の詩 Bird's Poem)	Shinji Orito	Kazuya Takase (I've Sound)	6:20
2.	"Farewell song"	Magome Togoshi	Magome Togoshi	5:35
3.	"Aozora" (青空 Blue Skies)	Jun Maeda	Shinji Orito	4:29

Side B
No.	Title	Music	Arrangement	Length
1.	"Tori no Uta Remixed Cosmic Seekers" (鳥の詩 Bird's Poem)	Shinji Orito	Cosmic Seekers	7:11
2.	"Farewell song Remixed Tsukasa"	Magome Togoshi	Tsukasa	9:06
Total length:				32:41

=== Air Film Soundtrack ===
The Air Film Soundtrack is the soundtrack for the Air film released by Frontier Works on March 25, 2005, bearing the catalog number FCCM-0066. The album spans one disc with twenty-three tracks featuring music composed by Yoshikazu Suo. The last song on the soundtrack, "If Dreams Came True", is sung by Eri Kawai, and takes its tune from the background music track "Futari" (ふたり, Two People), originally composed by Shinji Orito, featured in the Air visual novel.

All music is composed by and arranged by Yoshikazu Suo, except where noted.

Track listing
No.	Title	Length
1.	"Oku no Koshiki wa Kataru" (玄ノ轂ハ語ル The Distant Hub Says)	4:03
2.	"Gate of Air"	0:52
3.	"Shinwa e no Izanai (Part 1)" (神話への誘い Invitation to the Legend)	2:36
4.	"Misuzu to Yukito (Futari)" (ミスズとユキト～ふたり～ Misuzu and Yukito (Two People))	1:36
5.	"Anji, Soshite Jubaku" (暗示、そして呪縛 A Hint, and a Spell)	1:00
6.	"Fuan no Gradation" (不安のグラデーション Gradation of Anxiety)	2:07
7.	"Rokugen no Ryōiki" (六弦の領域 Domain of the Six Strings)	2:09
8.	"Yukito no Theme (Part 1)" (ユキトのテーマ Yukito's Theme)	2:26
9.	"Dai San Shinpi Kō" (第三神秘孝 The Third Study in Mystery)	0:51
10.	"Ame no Chi Kumori no Chi Love" (雨のち曇りのちLove Rain, then Clouds, then Love)	1:11
11.	"Tama wa Korogaru yo" (タマハコロガルヨ Look, the Ball is Rolling)	2:00
12.	"Mata, Ashita (Kaisōroku)" (また、あした～回想録～ See You Tomorrow (Reminiscence))	1:48
13.	"Ten no Ami, Utena no Hime" (天ノ網、台ノ姫 Net of Heaven, Princess of Tower)	2:12
14.	"Haruko no Theme" (ハルコのデーマ Haruko's Theme)	1:19
15.	"Taisetsu na Anata e (Yumegatari/Futari)" (大切なあなたへ～夢話り/ふたり～ To You My Precious Darling (Dream-telling/Two People))	3:48
16.	"Yumeutsutsu" (ユメウツツ Half Asleep)	0:39
17.	"Shinwa e no Izanai (Part 2)" (神話への誘い Invitation to the Legend)	0:50
18.	"Akuryō Ritsushō" (悪霊律抄 Commandments of the Devil)	1:35
19.	"Yukito no Theme (Part 2)" (ユキトのデーマ Yukito's Theme)	0:37
20.	"Tsubasa-nin Densetsu (Tori no Uta)" (翼人伝説～鳥の詩～ Legend of the Winged Humans (Bird's Poem))	4:23
21.	"Oku no Koshiki wa Kataru (Pf-intro)" (玄ノ轂ハ話ル The Distant Hub Says)	1:08
22.	"Shinwa e no Izanai (Part 3)" (神話への誘い Invitation to the Legend)	1:38
23.	"If Dreams Came True" (Lyrics by Linda Hennrick; Composed by Kei Haneoka (originally Shinji Orito); Arrangement by Yūjirō Okazaki; Performed by Eri Kawai)	5:07
Total length:		45:55

=== Shinwa e no Izanai ===
Shinwa e no Izanai (神話への誘い) is an album for the Air film released by Frontier Works on August 5, 2005, bearing the catalog number AIR-0005, and was only released bundled with the special edition Air film DVD. The album contains one disc with a four-movement symphony sampling from four of the themes featured on the Air Film Soundtrack. The pieces were originally composed by Yoshikazu Suo, Shinji Orito, and Kei Haneoka, and were arranged by Yuji Nomi. The symphony was played by the Czech Philharmonic and conducted by Mario Klemens.

Track listing
No.	Title	Music	Length
1.	"1st Movement [Daiichi Gakushō] ("Shinwa e no Izanai"/"Futari" yori)" (1st Movement [第一楽章] ～「神話への誘い」・「ふたり」より～ 1st Movement [First Movement] (From "Invitation to the Legend"/"Two People"))	Shinji Orito, Yoshikazu Suo	10:52
2.	"2nd Movement [Daini Gakushō] (Tori no Uta" yori)" (2nd Movement [第二楽章] ～「鳥の詩」より～ 2nd Movement [Second Movement] (From "Bird's Poem"))	Shinji Orito	9:40
3.	"Scherzo [Daisan Gakushō] ("Oku no Koshiki wa Kataru" yori)" (Scherzo [第三楽章] ～「玄ノ轂ハ語ル」より～ Scherzo [Third Movement] (From "The Distant Hub Says"))	Yoshikazu Suo	9:24
4.	"Finale [Daiyon Gakushō] ("If Dreams Came True" yori)" (Finale [第四楽章] ～「IF DREAMS CAME TRUE」より～ Finale [Fourth Movement] (From "If Dreams Came True"))	Kei Haneoka, Shinji Orito	10:32
Total length:			40:28

=== Summer Chronicle ===
Summer Chronicle is a remix album with music tracks taken from the Air, Kud Wafter and Summer Pockets visual novels and arranged into violin and piano versions by Hironori Anazawa. The album is otherwise composed by Jun Maeda, Shinji Orito, Magome Togoshi, Jun'ichi Shimizu and Donmaru. It was released on August 22, 2020, in Japan by Key Sounds Label bearing the catalog number KSLA-0170. The album contains one disc with ten tracks; tracks 1–4 are from Air, tracks 5 and 6 are from Kud Wafter, and tracks 7–10 are from Summer Pockets.

Track listing
No.	Title	Music	Length
1.	"Natsukage" (夏影 Summer Lights)	Jun Maeda	3:20
2.	"Yumegatari" (夢語り Dream-telling)	Shinji Orito	3:07
3.	"Semigoromo" (蝉衣 Thin Clothes)	Magome Togoshi	3:31
4.	"Tsukiwarawa" (月童 Moon Child)	Magome Togoshi	3:49
5.	"At The Mountain Behind"	Jun'ichi Shimizu	3:11
6.	"August Green"	Jun'ichi Shimizu	3:06
7.	"Summer Aventure" (さま～あばんちゅ～る Samā Abanchūru)	Donmaru	3:28
8.	"Natsu no Komoriuta" (夏の子守歌 Summer Lullaby)	Shinji Orito	4:03
9.	"Deep Blue Blue"	Shinji Orito	3:27
10.	"Twinkle of Alcor"	Donmaru	3:33
Total length:			34:35

== Natsukage / Nostalgia ==
"Natsukage / Nostalgia" is a single containing songs sung by I've Sound's Lia first released on August 10, 2001, at Comiket 60 in Japan by Key Sounds Label bearing the catalog number KSLA-0002. The single contains the A-side track "Natsukage" (夏影, Summer Lights) which was originally composed as a background music track for the Air visual novel. Depicted on the cover is Nagisa Furukawa from Key's later game Clannad.

All tracks are written by Jun Maeda.

Track listing
No.	Title	Arrangement	Length
1.	"Natsukage" (夏影 Summer Lights)	Ryō Okabe	5:53
2.	"Nostalgia"	Ryō Okabe	5:53
Total length:			11:46

== Charts ==
Albums	Release date	Label	Format	Peak Oricon chart positions
Air Film Soundtrack	March 25, 2005	Frontier Works (FCCM-0066)	CD	247
