= Yūichi Suzumoto =

Japanese novelist

- Born: January 13, 1969 (age 57); Shimizu-ku, Shizuoka, Japan
- Occupation: Author
- Writing career
- Genres: Fantasy, fiction, sci-fi
- Notable works: Air, Clannad, Planetarian: The Reverie of a Little Planet
- Notable awards: Japan Fantasy Novel Award

Yūichi Suzumoto (涼元 悠一, Suzumoto Yūichi; born January 13, 1969) is a male Japanese novelist originally from Shimizu-ku, Shizuoka, Japan, though he now lives in Osaka, Japan. As of 2006, he works for Aquaplus, known for being the publishing company of Leaf. Before going to Leaf, Suzumoto worked at the publishing company VisualArt's as a scenario writer for brands under the company. He is notable for having had a hand in the production of three Key visual novels: Air, Clannad, and Planetarian: The Reverie of a Little Planet.

== Career ==
After graduating from high school Shizuoka Prefecture Shitsu Shimizu East High School, Suzumoto entered a novel he wrote called Waga Seishun no Hokusei Kabe (我が青春の北西壁) into Shueisha's sixteenth Cobalt Novel Prize in 1991 and won first prize. The following year in March 1992, Shueisha published Suzumoto's novel Aitsu wa Dandelion (あいつはダンディー・ライオン) under their Cobalt Bunko label. In 1998, Suzumoto's novel Aoneko no Machi (青猫の街) tied in second in the tenth Japan Fantasy Novel Award competition. In 1999, Key released their first visual novel Kanon; the game had such an impact on Suzumoto that he joined VisualArt's, the publishing company Key is under, in February 2000 to work as a scenario writer for brands under the company.

Suzumoto first worked on the scenario for Air, Key's second game released in 2000, and that same year worked as a scenario assistant for Mamahaha Chōkyō by Giant Panda. In 2001, Suzumoto again worked as a scenario assistant for Giant Panda for their game Shoyakenjō, and started work on Key's next game Clannad which was not released until 2004. Also in 2001, Suzumoto was employed as the scenario assistant for the game Sakura no Ki Shita de for the brand Words which was released in 2002, and that year he began work as the scenario assistant for Studio Mebius' Snow released in 2003. Also in 2003, Suzumoto worked as the scenario assistant again for Giant Panda for their game Oshikake Princess released in 2004. After completing his work on Clannad, Suzumoto's last contribution to Key was as the scenario writer for Planetarian: The Reverie of a Little Planet released in 2004. Suzumoto continued to work with brands under VisualArt's until September 2005 when he resigned from the company. Suzumoto wrote a style guide entitled Novel Game no Scenario Sakusei Gihō (ノベルゲームのシナリオ作成技法) published on July 24, 2006 by Shuwa System which describes how to write scenarios for visual novels. In September 2006, Suzumoto entered the publishing company Aquaplus, known for being the parent company to Leaf. In December 2006, Suzumoto's first light novel Die Nachtjäger was published by SoftBank under their GA Bunko imprint.
