= Mamoru Yokota =

Japanese anime director

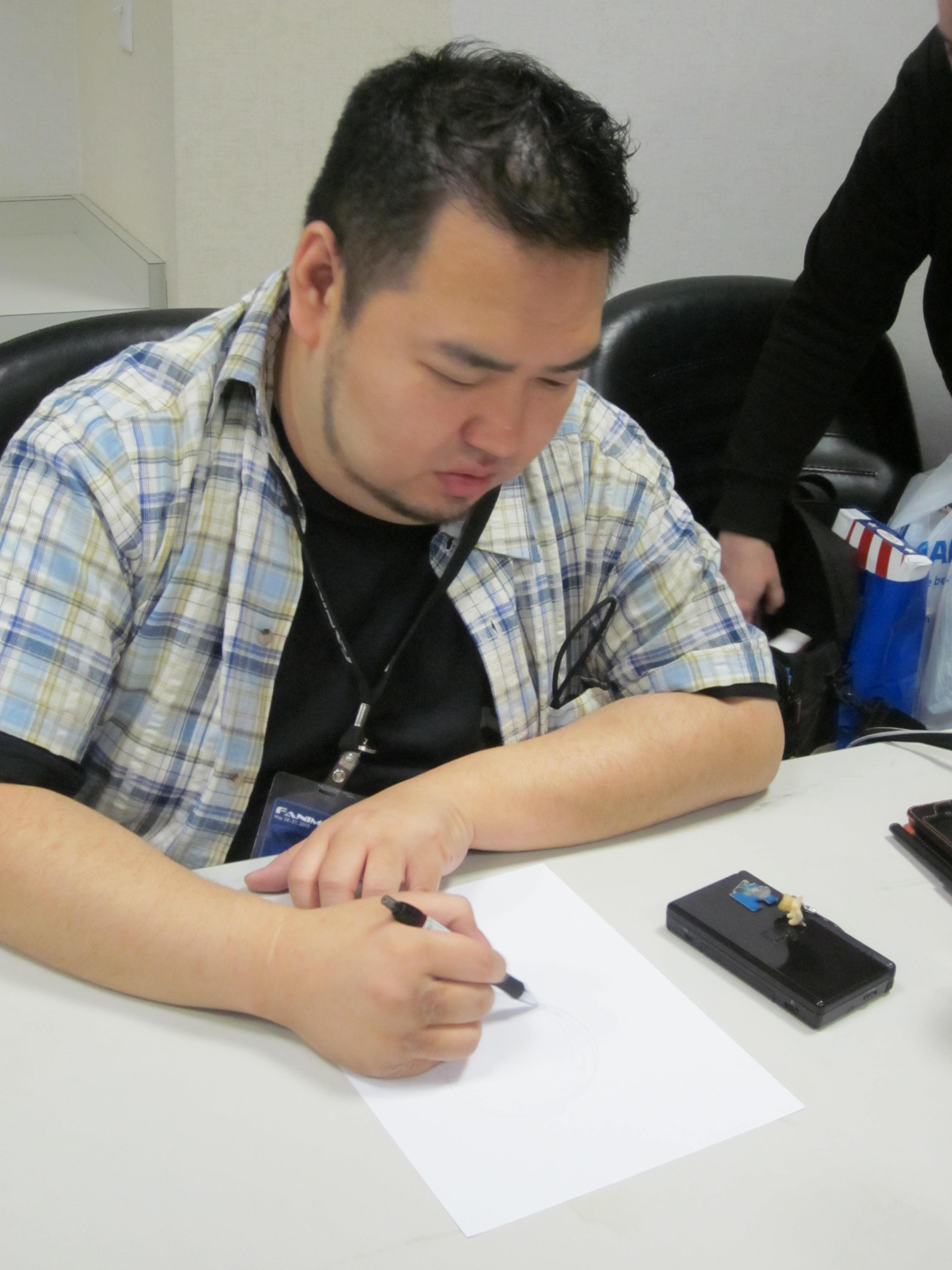
Yokota at FanimeCon 2010

Mamoru Yokota (横田守, Yokota Mamoru; born February 18) is a Japanese anime illustrator, and character designer, and producer.

== Anime involved in ==
- Air movie: Producer
- Angelium: Character Design (ep. 1)
- Death Note: Animation director
- Kanon: Producer
- Kiddy Grade: Eyecatch Illustration (ep 13)
- Magical Kanan: Character Design
- Naruto Shippuden: Animation director for episodes 279, 287, 298
