= Matsubishi Department Store =

Japanese department store in Shizuoka, Japan

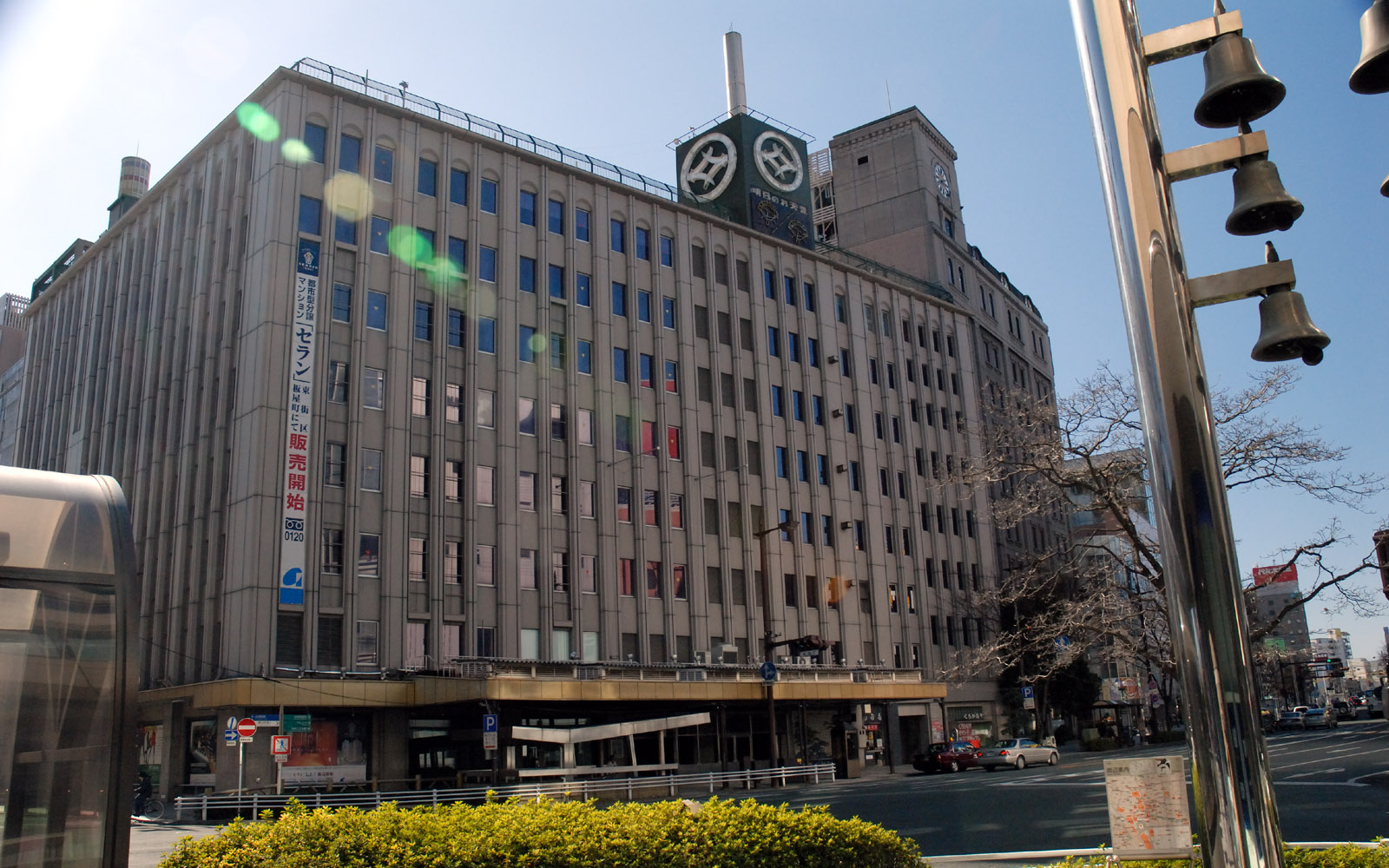
The Matsubishi Department Store.

The Matsubishi Department Store (松菱百貨店, Matsubishi Hyakkaten) was a Japanese department store located in Hamamatsu, Shizuoka, Japan.

== History ==
The building opened its doors on June 1, 1937 but by November 14, 2001, the store had accrued a 32.8 billion yen debt and went bankrupt. The building started demolition December 1, 2006 and finished by September of 2012. The building began construction in 1936. The Obayashi Corporation was responsible for its construction and the building finished construction on April 19, 1937. The building had 8 floors and a basement.

In 1945, during the second world war, the store was damaged by an air raid but managed to survive when most of the city didn't. 4 years later the store reopened to the public. During the 1970s the main building was extended. During 1988 the Entetsu Department store opened nearby which took business away from Matsubishi Department Store. In 2003, the assets for the department store were sold to the Asahi Corporation.

== Legacy ==
The store had many first such as being the first department store in Hamamatsu (1937), installing the first escalator in the Shizuoka Prefecture (1956) and having the first full building air conditioner in the Shizuoka Prefecture (1960).

== In fiction ==
The department store is one of the main settings for the visual novel Planetarian: The Reverie of a Little Planet developed by Key.
