= Air (video game) =

Japanese adult visual novel

- Cover featuring heroines (from left to right) Kano Kirishima, Misuzu Kamio and Minagi Tohno
- Developer: Key
- Publishers: Visual Arts (Windows, Android, iOS); NEC Interchannel (DC, PS2); Prototype (S3G, PSP, FOMA, PSV, Switch)
- Director: Jun Maeda
- Artist: Itaru Hinoue
- Writers: Jun Maeda; Yūichi Suzumoto; Takashi Ishikawa; Kai; Tōya Okano; Tomotaka Fujii
- Composers: Jun Maeda; Shinji Orito; Magome Togoshi
- Platforms: Microsoft Windows, Dreamcast, PlayStation 2, SoftBank 3G, PlayStation Portable, Freedom of Mobile Multimedia Access, Android, iOS, PlayStation Vita, Nintendo Switch
- Release: September 8, 2000: Windows; JP: September 8, 2000; JP: July 27, 2001; JP: April 8, 2005; JP: May 28, 2010; WW: March 5, 2025 Dreamcast; JP: September 20, 2001 PlayStation 2; JP: August 8, 2002 SoftBank 3G; JP: May 1, 2006 PlayStation Portable; JP: November 22, 2007 FOMA; JP: February 5, 2008 Android; JP: October 24, 2012; JP: May 2, 2013 iOS; JP: May 2, 2013 PlayStation Vita; JP: September 8, 2016 Nintendo Switch; JP: September 9, 2021; WW: July 14, 2025
- Genres: Eroge (Note: Only the original and 2005 Windows releases and the 2013 Android version has adult content.); visual novel
- Mode: Single-player

Air (stylized "AIR") is a Japanese visual novel developed by Key, a brand of Visual Arts. It was released on September 8, 2000, for Windows as an adult game. Key later released versions of Air without the erotic content, and the game was ported to the Dreamcast, PlayStation 2, PlayStation Portable, PlayStation Vita and Nintendo Switch. The story follows the life of Yukito Kunisaki, a traveling showman searching for the "girl in the sky". He arrives in a quiet, seaside town where he meets three girls, one of whom is the key to the end of his journey.

The gameplay in Air follows a branching plot line which offers pre-determined scenarios with courses of interaction, and focuses on the appeal of the three female main characters by the player character. The game is divided into three segments—Dream, Summer, and Air—which serve as different phases in the overall story. The title of the game reflects the prominent themes of the air, skies, and use of wings throughout gameplay. The game ranked as the best-selling PC game sold in Japan for the time of its release, and charted in the national top 50 several more times afterwards. Air has sold over 300,000 units across several platforms.

Following the game's release, Air made several transitions into other media. A manga by Yukimaru Katsura was serialized in Kadokawa Shoten's Comptiq, and later published into two volumes. Comic anthologies and art books were also published, as were audio dramas and several albums of music. Kyoto Animation produced a 13-episode anime television series and a two-episode anime mini-series in 2005, and Toei Animation produced an anime film in 2005. The anime adaptations are licensed by Funimation who released them in North America.

== Gameplay ==
Text in Air is displayed in a dialog box, here depicting the player character talking with Misuzu.

Air is a romance visual novel in which the player assumes the role of three characters. Much of its gameplay is spent on reading the story's narrative and dialogue. Air follows a branching plot line with multiple endings, and depending on the decisions that the player makes during the game, the plot will progress in a specific direction. With the consumer ports, if an undesired choice was selected, there would be an option to rewind the story to correct the mistake. However, if the player reaches a bad end to a storyline, the player does not have this option and must reload the game at the last saved point.

There are five main plot lines that the player will have the chance to experience, three which are initially available and two more which can later become available. Throughout gameplay, the player is given multiple options to choose from, and text progression pauses at these points until a choice is made. To view all plot lines in their entirety, the player will have to replay the game multiple times and choose different choices to further the plot to an alternate direction.

When first playing the game, the player assumes the role of Yukito Kunisaki and the scenarios for the three heroines are available in what is called the Dream story arc. After the plot lines for these three heroines have been completed, an additional scenario called Summer is made available where the player assumes the role of Ryūya. Summer is a linear novel arc in which no choices are presented to the player. Upon the completion of the Summer route, another scenario called Air is made available, which serves as the true ending to the story. In Air, the player assumes the role of a crow named Sora. In the adult versions of the game, there are scenes with sexual CGs depicting Yukito and a given heroine having sex. Later, Key released versions of Air without the erotic content.

== Plot ==
Air takes place in a town modeled on Kami, Japan.

=== Setting and themes ===
There are important locations featured in Air that are based on places in the city Kami in Hyōgo Prefecture, Japan. Air is set in the Kasumi district of Kami; during the course of the series' creation, Kasumi was an individual town that has since merged with two others to form the city of Kami. Many of the locales in Air, such as the seawall, the train station, the shrine, and the school are based on real places. As Air is set in the middle of summer, the season offers bright, sunny skies for the town during the day. In the manga adaptation, the town is described as a "quiet town with few people...with nothing but beaches and countryside." Scenario assistant Yūichi Suzumoto has commented that his impression of Air is similar to that of a folk song due to the rural setting and heartwarming story progression.

As indicated by the title, air, skies and wings are important themes: Yukito is searching for the "girl in the sky", and Misuzu believes that her other self is flying in the sky above her. Other characters show a similar relationship to the sky, such as Minagi who is a member of the astronomy club, and Michiru who has a fondness for bubbles that float in the air. Kano wants wings to fly, and Kanna already has them. Misuzu names a crow she finds Sora (空)—Japanese for "sky". Another major theme is the maternal bond, as the four heroines' stories, as well as Yukito's, revolve around their mothers, either biological or adoptive. Main scenario writer Jun Maeda commented that he prefers to include mothers in games if given the choice between only including a mother or a father, as is what happened with Air, though he backs this up by noting that in bishōjo games, women are the main focus anyway. Complicated relationships involving family members and friends play a key part throughout the story. One of the sub-themes in the story is magic. Uraha, Yukito's mother, and Yukito himself have the ability to use magic, though Yukito is the least skilled among them. Kano was told by her sister that when she grows up and takes off her yellow ribbon, she will gain the power to do magic. However, the problems of parents leaving their offspring and poverty are displayed realistically.

=== Characters ===
Cast
Role	Japanese	English
Yukito Kunisaki (Note: Kunisaki Yukito (国崎 往人))	Hikaru Midorikawa (game, film); Daisuke Ono (anime series)	Vic Mignogna
Misuzu Kamio (Note: Kamio Misuzu (神尾 観鈴))	Tomoko Kawakami	Monica Rial
Kano Kirishima (Note: Kirishima Kano (霧島 佳乃))	Asami Okamoto	Stephanie Wittels
Minagi Tohno (Note: Tōno Minagi (遠野 美凪))	Ryoka Yuzuki	Kira Vincent-Davis
Haruko Kamio (Note: Kamio Haruko (神尾 晴子))	Aya Hisakawa	Luci Christian
Hijiri Kirishima (Note: Kirishima Hijiri (霧島 聖))	Yumi Tōma	Christine Auten
Michiru (Note: (みちる))	Yukari Tamura	Serena Varghese
Kanna	Chinami Nishimura	Cynthia Martinez
Ryūya	Nobutoshi Canna	Jay Hickman
Uraha	Kikuko Inoue	Allison Sumrall
Potato (Note: Poteto (ポテト))	Hiromi Konno	Tiffany Grant

The player assumes the role of Yukito Kunisaki, the protagonist of Air. He lives a poor life going from town to town with little money, trying to make a living off his show with a puppet. As a young adult, Yukito sometimes acts childishly if provoked. Yukito tends to be helpful to those around him while trying to earn any money at the same time, and does his best to look after Misuzu in the Dream arc. Misuzu Kamio, the main heroine of Air, makes Yukito quite mistrustful at first by being too friendly, but eventually earns his affection. She is a cheerful but introverted, slightly clumsy and simplistic high school girl, and often utters the pseudo-dinosauric phrase gao when she feels troubled, a habit she retained from childhood. Misuzu has a great love of dinosaurs, finding the story of their glory and extinction "romantic". As a child, her fascination with dinosaurs stemmed from thinking chicks would grow into them; her adoptive mother Haruko Kamio thinks it is ridiculous.

The second of the three heroines Yukito meets after Misuzu is Kano Kirishima, a girl attending the same school as Misuzu. She is usually energetic, playful, and tells jokes by saying nonsensical things. Kano is friends with a strange stray dog named Potato that follows her around and is able to communicate in his strange manner of speech. Kano still believes in things she was told by her older sister Hijiri as a child as a way of coping with her past. The third and final heroine Yukito meets is a girl in Misuzu's class at school named Minagi Tohno, a top student in the school who is introverted as well. Until she met Yukito, her only friend was Michiru, with whom she often blows bubbles at the abandoned train station in town.

=== Story ===
Air's story begins on Monday, July 17, 2000, when traveling street performer Yukito Kunisaki arrives at a small seaside town. As a young adult, he has been traveling around Japan in continuation of his late mother's search for the "girl in the sky" who, according to a family legend, has been cursed to spend eternity all alone. Yukito's sole way of earning money is by performing a puppet show by moving a doll that has been passed down in his family with magic, but he fails to gain anyone's attention by doing so in this town. The next day, he meets Misuzu Kamio—a sincere yet clumsy high school girl who is eager to become friends with him. He accepts her offer to eat lunch at her home, and Misuzu's aunt and foster mother Haruko Kamio is later persuaded to let him stay for the time being. A few days later, Yukito meets two other girls who go to Misuzu's school—Kano Kirishima and Minagi Tohno—who, like Misuzu, have strange personalities connected with mysterious pasts. As Yukito grows closer to Misuzu, he realizes from the dreams she has been telling him about that she is in fact the girl in the sky. Yukito recalls his mother telling him that after the dreams, the girl in the sky would start to first physically weaken, followed by feeling pain from an unknown source, then forgetting about those closest to her, and finally be doomed to die alone. Yukito realizes that his mother had once had her own encounter with the girl in the sky, but she had been unable to save her from her fate. Ultimately, Yukito decides to stay with Misuzu, regretting that he did not play with her more when they first met. Yukito uses all of the accumulated wishes that his ancestors have imputed into the doll to grant his own wish to stay by Misuzu's side, and as a result, Yukito disappears.

In the summer 1,000 years prior during the Heian period, Kanna is one of the last winged beings who has been held prisoner at a Shinto shrine for much of her life. Kanna is set to be executed following a political change in the Imperial Court, but she escapes with the help of Ryūya, a member of her samurai guard, and her loyal retainer Uraha. They decide to go in search of Kanna's mother Yaobikuni, who according to rumor is imprisoned somewhere south of Kanna's shrine. Although they eventually find Yaobikuni and free her, she is killed by a group of archers soon after. In an attempt to save Ryūya and Uraha, Kanna sacrifices herself, leaving herself cursed by Buddhist monks to relive painful memories in the sky for eternity. This eventually weakens but does not go away entirely, allowing Kanna to continuously reincarnate as a human girl, with Misuzu being one such reincarnation.

Yukito's final wish to stay with Misuzu is granted in the form of his memories inhabiting a young crow Misuzu finds on July 16, 2000, and names Sora. The events of the previous timeline with Yukito play out again, but after Yukito disappears after the doll grants his wish, Yukito's memories within Sora surface, allowing him to give Misuzu the necessary encouragement to be strong until the end. Haruko tries to show Misuzu more affection than she has over the past ten years they have been living together, but by this point, Misuzu's condition continues to worsen, eventually mentally reverting to how she was when she and Haruko first met. Haruko continues to care for Misuzu, and Misuzu shows that she truly cares for Haruko by choosing to stay with her instead of leaving with her father. Haruko and Misuzu spend the next three days together as mother and daughter, culminating in Misuzu's death. As a result of Misuzu dying happily with her family, it is implied that she takes her happy memories back to Kanna, effectively breaking the curse. Metaphysically, Yukito's and Misuzu's present incarnations are shown to be a young boy and girl playing on the beach on July 17, 2000, as they are watched by Misuzu with Yukito asleep next to her.

== Development ==
After the release of Key's debut game Kanon (1999), video game director and Key co-founder Naoki Hisaya resigned from Key. Hisaya had led the planning of Kanon and was its main scenario writer in conjunction with fellow Key co-founder Jun Maeda. Hisaya's resignation resulted in Maeda leading the planning for Key's next work, with Maeda wanting to produce something different from not only Kanon, but also Moon (1997) and One: Kagayaku Kisetsu e (1998) that Maeda and other founding members of Key worked on previously as part of the brand Tactics under video game publisher Nexton. Maeda put pressure on himself to make something structurally different from Kanon, but he also took it upon himself following Hisaya's resignation to continue to produce "crying games" for Key's fan base. As with Kanon, Maeda wanted to write a moving story that would leave a strong impression on the player, but Air was not intentionally written to be soothing to the player despite this being a common impression by fans in October 2000. The concept for Air was one of several types of stories Maeda had wanted to write, and he chose to go with what would later become Air after careful consideration, along with taking into account the responses from people who had played Kanon.

According to writer and critic Shūichirō Sarashina, a common aspect of bishōjo games at the time was to treat the individual heroine routes equally, producing a coherent narrative as a result of a sum of its parts, and he notes that Kanon also followed this pattern. Maeda focused on straying from this pattern because he wanted players to experience the entire story as a whole, but he still wanted its content to be enjoyable as a bishōjo game so that as many people as possible would be satisfied by it. In doing so, Maeda kept the basic structure of having multiple heroine routes, but he realized that he could not give each character the same level of focus. When developing the plot, the basic structure of having multiple points of view and an overarching storyline had already been solidified, which according to Maeda was not something he was aware of having been done in visual novels at the time. Fellow scenario writer Yūichi Suzumoto was apprehensive about this structure when he first heard about the plot from Maeda, but Air executive producer and Visual Arts president Takahiro Baba had already given his approval for the project by then. In addition to Maeda and Suzumoto, Takashi Ishikawa is also listed as one of the main scenario writers. Scenario assistance was provided by Kai, Tōya Okano and Tomotaka Fujii.

In terms of gameplay, Air was designed to emphasize its story compared to its adventure game elements, with the development team opting to include very few choices to diverge the plot, which Maeda later regretted. According to Suzumoto, some players complained that Air did not feel like a game as a result, and that some found it boring because of a lack of these choices. Three heroine routes were developed to show a range of different possibilities the player character Yukito Kunisaki could take in parallel universes. In doing so, Maeda wanted to show that small variations can diverge Yukito's ultimate fate. In the planning stage, Maeda did not specifically include adult content due at least in part to his self-described inability to write detailed sex scenes. Maeda believed that people would have bought the game even without adult content, but he noted that this would have been impossible in the past. Suzumoto pointed out how most of the sex scenes in Kanon could be avoided, and although this is similar to how Air is structured, Suzumoto was one of the writers who made it so that at least two sex scenes in Air would be unavoidable.

Itaru Hinoue is the chief artist and character designer for Air, continuing from her position with Kanon. Further computer graphics were split between three artists—Miracle Mikipon, Na-Ga, and Shinory—and background art was provided by Din and Torino. The game's soundtrack was composed by Maeda, Shinji Orito and Magome Togoshi, who had started working with Key since before Kanon's release.

=== Release history ===
Air was released as an adult game on September 8, 2000, as a limited edition, playable on a Windows PC as a 2-disc CD-ROM set. The limited edition came bundled with the remix album Ornithopter remixing background music tracks featured in the visual novel. The regular edition was released on July 27, 2001. Key released on all ages version on July 27, 2001, for Windows. An updated adult version called the Air Standard Edition was released on April 8, 2005, with added support for Windows 2000/XP as a DVD-ROM. An updated all ages version of Air compatible for Windows Vista PCs was released by Key on July 31, 2009, in a box set containing five other Key visual novels called Key 10th Memorial Box. Another updated all ages version compatible for Windows 7 PCs called Air Memorial Edition was released on May 28, 2010.

The first consumer console port of the game was released for the Dreamcast (DC) on September 20, 2001, by NEC Interchannel. A PlayStation 2 (PS2) version was released on August 8, 2002, also by NEC Interchannel. The PS2 version was re-released as a "Best" version on September 1, 2005. The PS2 version was bundled in a "Key 3-Part Work Premium Box" package together with the PS2 versions of Kanon and Clannad released on July 30, 2009. To compensate for the lack of erotic content in the consumer ports, extra scenes were added. A version playable on SoftBank 3G mobile phones was released by Prototype through VisualArt's Motto on May 1, 2006. Prototype later released a VGA edition produced by NTT DoCoMo playable on FOMA phones on February 5, 2008. The version for the FOMA phones was split into two separate files: the Dream story arc comprised the first file, and the remaining Summer and Air arcs comprised the second file.

A version of the Dream story arc playable on Android devices was released on July 27, 2012. A version containing the Summer and Air arcs for Android devices was released on August 15, 2012. A full version Air on Android devices was released on October 24, 2012, in two editions: one without voice acting, and one with voice acting, including Yukito. Two versions were released on May 2, 2013: an adult version for Android devices and an all ages version playable on iOS devices. A PlayStation Portable (PSP) version of the game was released in Japan on November 22, 2007, by Prototype. A downloadable version of the PSP release via the PlayStation Store was released by Prototype on September 2, 2010. A PlayStation Vita (PSV) version was released by Prototype on September 8, 2016. A Nintendo Switch version was released in Japan on September 9, 2021. Both the PSV and Switch versions contained a visual novel version of Yūichi Suzumoto's short story "First Sky Chapter" (初空の章, Hatsuzora no Shō; lit. New Year's Morning Sky Chapter) as a prequel to the Summer story arc about how Kanna and Uraha met. In the original release, there was no voice acting for the characters, though this was later changed for the DC version, which except for Yukito included full voice acting, and the PS2, PSP, PSV and Switch versions, which had full voice acting.

A Windows version of Air with Japanese, English, and Simplified Chinese was released via Steam on March 5, 2025. It included full voice acting and the "First Sky Chapter" short story. It was released on Nintendo Switch on July 14, 2025.

== Adaptations ==
- Air
- Genre: Drama, fantasy, romance
- Manga
- Written by: Key
- Illustrated by: Yukimaru Katsura
- Published by: Kadokawa Shoten
- Magazine: Comptiq
- Original run: August 10, 2004 – February 10, 2006
- Volumes: 2
- Anime television series

Air; Air in Summer
- Directed by: Tatsuya Ishihara
- Written by: Fumihiko Shimo
- Music by: Jun Maeda; Shinji Orito; Magome Togoshi
- Studio: Kyoto Animation
- Licensed by: Funimation (expired): UK: MVM Entertainment
- Original network: BS-i
- English network: NA: Anime Network
- Original run: January 6, 2005 – September 4, 2005
- Episodes: 15
- Film
- Air

=== Print ===
A short story, titled "Hatsuzora no Shō" (初空の章, New Year's Morning Sky Chapter) and written by Yūichi Suzumoto, was published in the Kanowo appendix to Kadokawa Corporation's Comptiq magazine on December 1, 2000. Jive published two volumes of an anthology titled Air Anthology Novel between September 1 and December 1, 2004.

An Air manga was serialized in the Japanese computer game magazine Comptiq between August 10, 2004, and February 10, 2006. The individual chapters were later collected into two separate volumes published by Kadokawa Shoten. The story was adapted from the visual novel version that preceded it, and was illustrated by Japanese artist Yukimaru Katsura. Between the two volumes, there are 15 main chapters (nine in volume one and six in volume two), and two bonus chapters included at the end of each volume. The manga version goes through the Dream and Air arcs in detail while the Summer arc is only touched upon briefly throughout the manga. The main focus is on Misuzu's story with Kano and Minagi serving as minor characters in comparison. However, Minagi's story is explained in the bonus installment at the end of volume two.

There are also five sets of manga anthologies produced by different companies and drawn by a multitude of different artists. The first volume of the earliest anthology series, released by Ichijinsha under the title Air Comic Anthology, was released on January 25, 2001, under their DNA Media Comics label. Volumes for this series continued to be released until December 25, 2001, with the seventh volume. The second anthology, Air Anthology Comic, was released in a single volume by Softgarage on December 20, 2002. On April 17, 2004, Ohzora released an anthology composed of works based on both Kanon and Air titled Haru Urara: Kanon & Air. Ohzora also released three other anthologies under the title Air, the last of which came out on March 24, 2005. The last manga anthology was released as a single volume on April 2, 2005, by Jive titled Comic Anthology Air: Kimi no Iru Basho. Each of the anthology series are written and drawn by an average of 20 people per volume.

=== Drama CDs ===
There were nine drama CDs released based on Air released by Lantis. The first three focused solely on each of the main heroines separately per CD where the cover of the album would depict which of the girls to be presented. These three albums were released on August 24, 2005. The next set of three was done the same way and released on October 21, 2005. The last three were released in one month increments after the second batch of three drama CDs went on sale. The seventh CD focused on the events of the Summer arc in the story while the last two were based on the Air arc. At least the last CD released on January 25, 2006, contained original stories in addition to the story from the visual novel.

=== Anime series ===
The cover of the first DVD compilation volume for the Air anime series

On November 17, 2004, a teaser DVD named "Air prelude" was produced containing interviews with the anime's cast, clean opening and ending theme video sequences, and promotional footage of the anime itself; it was a limited edition DVD, with only 20,000 copies produced. The anime television series is produced by Kyoto Animation, directed by Tatsuya Ishihara, written by Fumihiko Shimo, and features character design by Tomoe Aratani who based the designs on Itaru Hinoue's original concept. Thirteen episodes were produced by Kyoto Animation: 12 regular episodes, and a final recap episode which summarizes Misuzu's story arc. The anime also follows the game by splitting the series into three parts; Dream (episodes one through seven), Summer (episodes eight and nine), and Air (episodes 10 through 12), with the recap episode (episode 13) following. The episodes aired between January 6 and March 31, 2005, on the BS-i Japanese television network. The theme songs from the Air visual novel are used for the anime's opening theme, ending theme and soundtrack. After the conclusion of the anime series, a mini-series which added to the Summer arc of the story called Air in Summer aired on August 28 and September 4, 2005, a week later on BS-i. Air in Summer consisted of two episodes and was produced by the same staff as the anime series.

A DVD released on March 31, 2005, called "Air Memories" contained promotional commercials for the series, staff commentaries, and clean ending sequences from the 12th and 13th episodes, lasting 92 minutes. The episodes were released to Region 2 DVD between April 6 and September 7, 2005, by Pony Canyon in limited and regular editions containing two episodes per volume. The DVD for Air in Summer was later released on October 5, 2005, in Japan. Additionally, Air became one of the first anime series to be released in Blu-ray Disc format on December 22, 2006. A new version of the Blu-ray Disc box set was released on November 28, 2008, in Japan.

On April 27, 2007, ADV Films co-founder and executive Matt Greenfield announced the acquisition of both the anime series and the film during a panel at the anime convention Anime Matsuri; it paid $145,000 for the TV series. The 12 main episodes and two Air in Summer episodes were licensed for North American distribution by ADV Films. The episodes were released on four DVD compilations between August 14 and November 27, 2007. The second DVD volume was sold in two editions, with the difference between the two being a series box all four DVDs could fit inside. In July 2008, the license for the anime series and film was transferred to Funimation, which is now branded as Crunchyroll as of 2022, who continued to produce them in North America in English. Funimation released a three-disc series box set of the Air anime on April 21, 2009, which did not include the recap episode. MVM Entertainment announced a UK DVD release of Air with Air in Summer to be released on April 4, 2022.

=== Film ===
An Air animated film directed by Osamu Dezaki premiered in Japanese theaters on February 5, 2005. The film, animated by Toei Animation, is a reinterpretation of the original Air storyline which centers on the story arc of the female lead Misuzu Kamio. Yukito Kunisaki arrives in the town of Kami for a chance to earn money at the summer festival and meets Misuzu on his first day in town. They soon become friends and a story one thousand years old begins to unfold. The film was later sold on DVD and released in three editions: the Collector's Edition, the Special Edition, and the Regular Edition on August 5, 2005. The Air film was originally released on DVD by ADV Films in North America on December 11, 2007. Funimation continued the release of the film as of July 2008 when the license was transferred from ADV to Funimation; Funimation re-released the film on April 21, 2009.

== Music ==
The visual novel has three main theme songs: the opening theme "Tori no Uta" (鳥の詩, Bird's Poem), the ending theme "Farewell song", and "Aozora" (青空, Blue Skies) as an insert song. Each song is sung by Lia of I've Sound and the lyrics were written by Jun Maeda. Five of the characters have leitmotifs, or background music theme songs—the three heroines, Kanna, and Michiru. Misuzu's theme is "Natsukage" (夏影, Summer Lights); Kano's theme is "Mizutamari" (水たまり, Puddle); Minagi's theme is "Niji" (虹, Rainbows); Kanna's theme is "Tsukiwarawa" (月童, Moon Child); lastly, Michiru's theme is "Tentōmushi" (てんとう虫, Ladybug). Of the six music tracks not used in the visual novel, but of which were included on the game's original soundtrack, the first two were failed attempts at creating a theme for Minagi.

The first album, Ornithopter, came bundled with the original release of Air in September 2000. The next album was released in August 2001 as a maxi single titled "Natsukage / Nostalgia" containing a vocal version of "Natsukage", and a B-side track; both songs were sung by Lia and the rest of the single was produced by Jun Maeda. The game's original soundtrack was released in September 2002 containing two discs with 31 different tracks along with remix and instrumental versions of the opening and ending themes. A piano arrange album was released in December 2003 called Re-feel which contained five tracks from Air and five from Kanon. An EP containing original versions of the three theme songs and remixed versions of the opening and ending themes was released in May 2006 called Air Analog Collector's Edition: Tori no Uta / Farewell song. Each of the albums released for the visual novel version were released on Key's record label Key Sounds Label. The film's original soundtrack was released in March 2005 by Frontier Works. A bonus symphony CD titled Shinwa e no Izanai was released with the special edition Air film DVD on August 5, 2005. Overall, Air's music has been well received, and the original soundtrack for the visual novel has met with high sales. The opening theme was involved in copyright infringement in 2005.

== Reception and sales ==
According to a national ranking of how well bishōjo games sold nationally in Japan, the original Air PC release premiered at number one in the rankings. The game ranked twice at 42 in November and December 2000, at 20 in January 2001, and twice more at 42 through February 2001. The original release appeared on the charts twice more: the first in late September to early October 2001 at 26, and again in the last two weeks of May 2002, ranking in at 43. The regular edition of the Air PC release premiered at number 13, ranked in at number 41 in the following ranking, and 42 in the ranking after that. The PC all ages version premiered at number seven in the rankings and had a final ranking at 30 in the next ranking. The Air Standard Edition premiered at number one in the rankings. The Air Standard Edition ranked in twice more, at 34 and at 28 in the next two rankings. Air was the highest selling game of 2000 selling 102,080 units, which was about 25,000 more units than the second highest game, Inagawa de Ikō!. The Dreamcast version sold 42,445 units in its first week, and was the fourth highest selling console game in Japan that week. The video game magazine Famitsu scored this version a 30 out of 40, and it ultimately sold 50,406 units to rank as the 53rd highest selling Japanese Dreamcast game ever, as of 2007. NTT Publishing reported that over 300,000 units of Air have been sold.

Air was described as a game that stands out, much like Key's first title Kanon, due to an intricate plot that keeps the player interested, and has a good replay value as well. In an interview of Jun Maeda and Yūichi Suzumoto, they were both surprised to find out that the Japanese public (in March 2001) felt Air to be a soothing game, but Maeda and Suzumoto made it clear that this impression is completely at odds with their impression of the game, and they remark that there was not one person who worked on Air who thought that. Characters from Air have appeared in dōjin works not directly based on the Air series. Games such as Eternal Fighter Zero -Blue Sky Edition- by Twilight Frontier where most of the playable characters either came from Air or from the earlier Key games Kanon or One. In the October 2007 issue of Dengeki G's Magazine, poll results for the 50 best bishōjo games were released. Out of 249 titles, Air ranked eighth with 43 votes.
