= Air (2005 film) =

- American DVD cover of the film.
- Directed by: Osamu Dezaki
- Written by: Makoto Nakamura
- Based on: Air by Key
- Produced by: Iriya Azuma; Mamoru Yokota
- Starring: Hikaru Midorikawa; Tomoko Kawakami; Aya Hisakawa
- Edited by: Masahiro Goto
- Music by: Yoshikazu Suo
- Production company: Toei Animation
- Release date: February 5, 2005
- Running time: 91 minutes
- Country: Japan
- Language: Japanese

Air is a 2005 Japanese anime drama film directed by Osamu Dezaki and written by Makoto Nakamura based on the visual novel Air by Key. Originally, the film was set for a release date in autumn 2004, but was delayed; the film finally premiered in Japanese theaters on February 5, 2005. The film, animated by Toei Animation, is a reinterpretation of the original Air storyline which centers on the story arc of the female lead Misuzu Kamio. Yukito Kunisaki arrives in the town of Kami for a chance to earn money at the summer festival and meets Misuzu on his first day in town. They soon become best friends and a story one thousand years old begins to unfold.

Before going to DVD, a 30-minute sample of the film was streamed online by Animate from June 2–16, 2005, two weeks later. The film was later sold on DVD and released in three editions: the Collector's Edition, the Special Edition, and the Regular Edition on August 5, 2005. The Air film was licensed for English language distribution by ADV Films and was released on December 11, 2007. The license of the film was transferred to Funimation in July 2008 who will continue to release the film in North America. To commemorate the release of the Clannad film, Animate streamed the Air film on their website which was split into three parts.

== Plot ==
Yukito Kunisaki (Hikaru Midorikawa), a traveling puppeteer with a goal to find the "girl in the sky" that been passed down his family for generations, arrives in a sea-side town of Kami in the hopes of earning money at the upcoming summer festival. At the same time, Misuzu Kamio (Tomoko Kawakami) is just leaving school after discussing her summer project. Choosing to do a project on the history of the town, Misuzu finds a book containing the story of Kannabi no Mikoto (Chinami Nishimura) in her town, the inspiration for the festival next week. After crashing her bike she encounters Yukito on the beach, Misuzu invites Yukito to stay at her home until the festival begins after learning that he has no place to stay. Meeting Misuzu's eccentric aunt Haruko Kamio (Aya Hisakawa), and getting a hangover the next morning from drinking with her, Yukito accompanies Misuzu throughout the town as she does research for her project.

As the two become closer, the story of Kannabi no Mikoto, or Kanna for short begins to unfold, telling how Kanna, the last of the winged beings, fell in love with her guardian Ryūya (Nobutoshi Canna) while being sequestered in a palace under penalty of death if she attempted to leave. The two eventually become lovers, Kanna reveals her desire to see the ocean and use her wings to fly to her mother, whom she was separated from at birth. Apparently, Ryūya decides to help Kanna see her dream of the ocean and the two plot their escape.

In the present day, Misuzu's mysterious illness from her childhood resurfaces, leading Haruko to arrange for Keisuke Tachibana, Misuzu's father, to take her to a hospital where she can be treated. In a flashback, Kanna is seen with similar symptoms and tells Ryūya that the reason for her illness is punishment because she has fallen in love with him, which goes against the laws of her kind. Yukito becomes conflicted by both his feelings for Misuzu and his wish to continue wandering and leaves during the night. However, soon after he arrives at the bus stop, the crow Sora, reminds him of his real reason for coming to the town: to earn money; Yukito heads back into town for the festival. Meanwhile, Haruko is preparing to take Misuzu to the festival when Keisuke arrives to take his daughter away. An emotional Haruko tells a shocked Misuzu that the reason she called her father is because Haruko cannot stand to see Misuzu becoming increasingly ill, but as Misuzu and Keisuke leave Haruko is seen crying at the loss. While driving through the crowds at the festival, Misuzu suddenly leaves Keisuke's car after seeing a float of Kannabi no Mikoto pass and prompts a panicked search by Keisuke and Haruko.

During her search, Haruko finds Yukito performing, and while he is at first unwilling, after recalling how he failed Misuzu in his past life as Ryūya, he joins in the search and frantically runs to the temple of Kannabi no Mikoto. Misuzu herself recalls her past life as Kanna and her fateful escape from her confinement, remembering that both Ryūya and her mother died soon after she took flight; the former by a barrage of arrows in retaliation from the guards and the latter by leaving her prison to see her daughter after hearing her voice calling. Kanna herself was impaled by hundreds of arrows, but strangely never hit the ground and simply remained in the air. As the film concludes, Yukito arrives at the temple and confesses his love for Misuzu, and after reuniting with Haruko, the trio returns to the Kamio residence.

A short time later, Haruko and Yukito decide to send Misuzu to a hospital to treat her, cutting her hair before she leaves and taking her to the ocean as per her request. At the ocean, a weakened Misuzu gets up and tries to reach Haruko and Yukito, the two most important people in her life. She finally reaches them only to collapse in Yukito's arms and die having finally reached her goal. Yukito is last seen leaving town in the autumn and promising to find Misuzu wherever she appears next in the hope that he will someday be able to break her curse and let her be free.

== Media releases ==
=== DVDs ===
The original version of the film was later sold on DVD and released in three editions: the Collector's Edition, the Special Edition, and the Regular Edition on August 5, 2005. The Collector's Edition was sold as a specialized box set including, with the film DVD, a separate DVD containing four promotional images and four television commercials advertising the film. A 402-page booklet was included in the box set containing detailed storyboards, and a draft of the film's scenario. The Special Edition was similarly released in a box set containing the film DVD, along with a 61-minute drama CD containing twelve tracks, and a 40-minute full orchestra entitled Shinwa e no Izanai CD featuring four songs in the film. The Regular Edition contained no special features and was sold in a normal DVD case containing only the film DVD. The English-language version of the film was released by ADV Films on December 11, 2007, who paid $20,000 for the licence. In July 2008, the license of the film was transferred to Funimation who continues to release the film in North America.

=== Soundtrack ===
The original soundtrack entitled Air Film Soundtrack was first released on March 25, 2005, by Frontier Works. The soundtrack contained one disc with twenty-three tracks. The first twenty-two tracks are the background music played throughout the film composed by Japanese composer Yoshikazu Suo. The final track on the CD, "If Dreams Came True", is a song based on the song "Futari" (ふたり, Two People) on the Air Original Soundtrack for the original visual novel; "If Dreams Came True" is sung by Japanese singer Eri Kawai.

== Reception ==
Theron Martin of Anime News Network described the film as a "more narrowly-focused love story" compared to the "emotional, familial-oriented moefest of the original series." Chris Beveridge of Mania wrote, "If you're not interested in a TV series, the film really captures much of the same material in a compact way without losing the real emotions."
