= Eufonius discography =

- Studio albums: 18
- Compilation albums: 1
- Singles: 27
- Music videos: 1
- Other albums: 36
- Other video albums: 2

The discography of Eufonius, a progressive pop rock band from Japan, consists of 18 studio albums, 1 compilation album, 27 singles, and 1 music video. Eufonius' vocalist Riya and keyboardist Hajime Kikuchi originally produced independent music individually, but after a chance meeting on the Internet in 2003, the two formed Eufonius. The duo independently released their self-titled debut album Eufonius (2003) at the M3 dōjin music convention, followed by their independently released debut single "Guruguru" (2004) also at M3. Eufonius made their major debut on King with their second single "Habataku Mirai" (2004), which appeared on their major debut album Subarashiki Sekai (2006). "Habataku Mirai" was the first release by Eufonius to chart on the Japanese Oricon charts, peaking at No. 80. The band's highest charting single is "Hiyoku no Hane" (2010), which peaked at No. 16.

Eufonius has continued to release independent albums and singles even after their major debut, as with their albums Eufonius+ (2005) and Σ (2007). The band released their second major album Metafysik (2007) on Lantis, followed by two more independent albums—Metro Chrome (2008) and Nejimaki Musica (2009). Eufonius released their eighth album Ao no Scape (2009) on GloryHeaven (attached to Lantis), which peaked at No. 55 on the Oricon albums chart, making it their most successful album to date. An independent, follow-up album for Nejimaki Musica titled Nejimaki Musica 2 was released in April 2010. Eufonius released three albums in 2011: their independent album Bezel, Aletheia released on Team Entertainment, and Phonon released on GloryHeaven. Eufonius' next two albums were independently released: Nejimaki Musica 3 (2012) and Frasco (2014). Eufonius released their 15th album Kioku Seizu (2014) on Lantis. Eufonius released their compilation album Kalyteryz in 2015 on Lantis. Eufonius released their independent albums Noesis in 2015, Sorafuruhate in 2016, and Phols in 2021.

== Albums ==
=== Studio albums ===
Year	Album details	Peak Oricon chart positions
2003	Eufonius^{[A]}: Released: October 11, 2003; Label: Frequency→e; Format: CD	—
2005	Eufonius+^{[A]}: Released: April 27, 2005; Label: Frequency→e (EFLA-0001); Format: CD	—
2006	Subarashiki Sekai: Released: May 24, 2006; Label: King (KICS-1212); Format: CD	100
2007	Σ^{[A]}: Released: January 31, 2007; Label: Frequency→e (EFLA-0003); Format: CD	233
2007	Metafysik: Released: December 19, 2007; Label: Lantis (LACA-5715); Format: CD	74
2008	Metro Chrome^{[A]}: Released: June 10, 2008; Label: Frequency→e (EFLA-0004); Format: CD	61
2009	Nejimaki Musica^{[A]}: Released: July 7, 2009; Label: Frequency→e (EFLA-0005); Format: CD	161
2009	Ao no Scape: Released: September 30, 2009; Label: GloryHeaven (Lantis) (LASA-5017); Format: CD	55
2010	Nejimaki Musica 2^{[A]}: Released: April 14, 2010; Label: Frequency→e (EFLA-0006); Format: CD	—
2011	Bezel^{[A]}: Released: May 30, 2011; Label: Frequency→e (EFLA-0008); Format: CD	—
2011	Aletheia: Released: October 26, 2011; Label: Team Entertainment (KDSD-00500); Format: CD	63
2011	Phonon: Released: November 23, 2011; Label: GloryHeaven (Lantis) (LASA-5108); Format: CD	80
2012	Nejimaki Musica 3^{[A]}: Released: July 9, 2012; Label: Frequency→e (EFLA-0010); Format: CD	—
2014	Frasco^{[A]}: Released: January 14, 2014; Label: Frequency→e (EFLA-0012); Format: CD	—
2014	Kioku Seizu: Released: August 27, 2014; Label: Lantis (LACA-15444); Format: CD	129
2015	Noesis^{[A]}: Released: July 7, 2015; Label: Frequency→e (EFLA-0015); Format: CD	—
2016	Sorafuruhate^{[A]}: Released: June 6, 2016; Label: Frequency→e (EFLA-0016); Format: CD	—
2021	Phols^{[A]}: Released: March 17, 2021; Label: Frequency→e (EFLA-0018); Format: CD	—
"—" denotes releases that did not chart.

=== Compilation albums ===
Year	Album details	Peak Oricon chart positions
2015	Kalyteryz: Released: March 11, 2015; Label: Lantis (LACA-9378–9379); Format: CD	84

== Singles ==
Year	Song	Peak Oricon chart positions	Album
2004	"Guruguru"^{[A]}	—	Eufonius+
2004	"Habataku Mirai"	80	Subarashiki Sekai
2005	"Chiisana Uta"^{[A]}	—	Metro Chrome
2005	"Idea"	94	Metafysik
2006	"Koisuru Kokoro"	51	Metafysik
2007	"Apocrypha"	46	Metafysik
2007	"Mag Mell: Frequency⇒e Ver."	—	Non-album single
2008	"Reflectier"	24	Ao no Scape
2009	"Anemoi"	51	Ao no Scape
2009	"Kono Koe ga Todoitara"	79	Aletheia
2009	"Phosphorus"	27	Ao no Scape
2009	"Divinity"	95	Aletheia
2009	"Gleaming Sky"	—	Kalyteryz
2010	"Haruka na Hibi"	71	Phonon
2010	"Hiyoku no Hane"	16	Phonon
2011	"Literal"^{[A]}	—	Non-album single
2012	"Prism Sign"	53	Kioku Seizu
2012	"Paradigm"	23	Kalyteryz
2013	"S/N"^{[A]}	—	Non-album single
2014	"Refionius"^{[A]}	—	Non-album single
2014	"Sati"^{[A]}	—	Non-album single
2017	"Kokoro ni Tsubomi"	68	
"—" denotes releases that did not chart.

=== Collaborations ===
Year	Songs	Peak Oricon chart positions	Album
2005	"New World / Bokura no Jikan" (with Bae Yumi of M.I.L.K.)	41	Subarashiki Sekai
2006	"Taiyō no Kakera / Guruguru: Himawari Version" (with Ryōko Shiraishi)	81	Subarashiki Sekai
2007	"Sorairo no Tsubasa / Kirakira" (with Ryōko Shiraishi)	89	Phonon
2007	"Mag Mell / Dango Daikazoku" (with Chata)	18	Kalyteryz
2008	"Blooms Again. / Indelible Name"^{[A]} (with Mai Nakahara)	—	Metro Chrome
"—" denotes releases that did not chart.

== Music videos ==
Year	Song	Director
2006	"Habataku Mirai"	

== Other album appearances ==
=== Soundtracks ===
Year	Song(s)	Album	Notes	Ref.
2004	"Mag Mell"	Mabinogi	Theme song to the Clannad visual novel.	
2004	"Mag Mell"	Clannad Original Soundtrack	Theme song to Clannad visual novel. The original version is featured as well as a remix, "Mag Mell -cockool mix-"; both the original and remix are included as full, short and instrumental versions.	
2004	"Mag Mell"	-Memento-	Theme song to the Clannad visual novel; "Mag Mell" is featured as a remix version.	
2005	"Habataku Mirai" "Yawarakai Kaze no Naka de"	Sound of Twin Wish	Theme songs to Futakoi anime series. "Habataku Mirai" is featured in short and strings version; "Yawarakai Kaze no Naka de" is featured in short, piano and instrumental versions.	
2005	"Bokura no Jikan"	Happy Detective Lives	Theme song to Futakoi Alternative anime series; "Bokura no Jikan" is featured as a short version.	
2005	"Bokura no Jikan"	A Story of Love	Theme song to Futakoi Alternative anime series; "Bokura no Jikan" is featured as two remixes.	
2006	"Koisuru Kokoro"	Kashimashi: Girl Meets Girl Original Soundtrack	Theme song to Kashimashi: Girl Meets Girl anime series; "Koisuru Kokoro" is featured as a short version.	
2006	"Idea"	Noein Original Soundtrack 2	Theme song to Noein anime series; "Idea" is featured as a short version.	
2006	"Guruguru: Himawari Version"	Himawari! Original Soundtrack Himawari Oto Emaki	Theme song to Himawari! anime series; "Guruguru: Himawari Version" is featured as a short version.	
2007	"Kirakira"	Himawari!! Original Soundtrack: Season Flowers	Theme song to Himawari!! anime series; "Kirakira" is featured as a short version.	
2007	"Kimi no Katachi"	Oratorio	Theme song to Sola anime series.	
2007	"Mag Mell: Frequency⇒e Ver." "Marmelo: Fildychrom" "Chiisana Tenohira: Eufonius Ver."	Clannad Film Soundtrack	Theme songs to Clannad animated film.	
2007	"Sanpomichi" "Yūzora Waltz"	Soshite Ashita no Sekai yori: Image Album	Theme songs to Soshite Ashita no Sekai yori visual novel.	
2008	"Reflectier" "Aburamushi no Uta: Demo Track Ver."	True Tears Original Soundtrack	Theme songs to True Tears anime series; "Reflectier" is featured as a short version.	
2008	"Sono Mama no Boku de" "Angel on Tree"	Tears...For Truth: True Tears Image Song Collection	Theme songs to True Tears anime series.	
2009	"Gebiet" "Anemoi"	Sora o Miageru Shōjo no Hitomi ni Utsuru Sekai Inspired Album	Theme songs to Sora o Miageru Shōjo no Hitomi ni Utsuru Sekai anime series; "Anemoi" is featured in short and remix versions.	
2009	"Kono Koe ga Todoitara" "Hoshi no Pulse"	Canvas 3: Hakugin no Portrait Original Soundtrack	Theme songs to the Canvas 3: Hakugin no Portrait visual novel.	
2009	"Phosphorus"	Shinkyoku Sōkai Polyphonica Crimson S Original Soundtrack: A Sacred Promise	Theme song to Shinkyoku Sōkai Polyphonica Crimson S anime series; "Phosphorus" is featured as a short version.	
2009	"Mana"	Bungaku Shōjo to Shinitagari no Piero Zenpen	A drama CD for the Book Girl light novel series; "Mana" is featured as a short version.	
2010	"Mana"	Bungaku Shōjo to Uekawaku Ghost Zenpen	A drama CD for the Book Girl light novel series; "Mana" is featured as a short version.	
2010	"Namida no Kioku" "Katagoshi no Sora"	Nostalgic Arietta	A vocal mini album for the True Tears anime series.	
2010	"Gleaming Sky" "Gleaming Sky (cuckool mix)"	Himawari: Pebble in the Sky Portable Original Soundtrack	Theme songs to the Himawari: Pebble in the Sky visual novel.	
2010	"Narcissu (eon)" "Liaison"	Narcissu: Moshimo Ashita ga Aru nara Portable Vocal Album	Theme songs to the Narcissu: Moshimo Ashita ga Aru nara Portable visual novel.	
2010	"Confetti" "Shirei no Oka" "Epilogue"	Akizora ni Mau Confetti Original Soundtrack^{[A]}	Theme songs to the Akizora ni Mau Confetti visual novel.	
2011	"Holograph"	Grisaia no Kajitsu ED Shudaika-shū & Original Soundtrack	One of the ending themes to the Grisaia no Kajitsu visual novel.	
2011	"Kirari Kururi" "My Smile"	My Smile: Eufonius Meets Mai no Mahō to Katei no Hi	Theme songs to Mai no Mahō to Katei no Hi anime series.	
2011	"Shin'en no Kizuna"	Koi de wa Naku: It's not love, but so where near. Original Soundtrack	Ending theme song to the Koi de wa Naku: It's not love, but so where near. visual novel.	
2011	"Aletheia (Game ver.)" "Kimi ni Aeta kara"	Irotoridori no Sekai Original Soundtrack	Theme songs to the Irotoridori no Sekai visual novel.	
2012	"Hikari Kagayaku Sekai" "Eien no Hikari (Song of love to a blue sky)"	Irotoridori no Hikari Theme Songs Plus	Theme songs to the Irotoridori no Hikari visual novel.	
2012	"Aletheia" "Kimi no Aeta kara" "Hikari Kagayaku Sekai" "Eien no Hikari (Song of love to a blue sky)"	Favorite 10th Anniversary Vocal Collection	Anthology collection of theme songs featured in visual novels by the brand Favorite.	
2012	"Pretiola" "Pretiola (Off Vocal)"	Unchain Blades Exxiv Vocal Collection	Theme song to the Unchain Blades Exxiv video game.	
2013	"Reflectier" "Prism Sign" "Near and Far" "Reflectier (TV Size)" "Aburamushi no Uta: Demo Track Ver." "Sono Mama no Boku de" "Angel on Tree" "Namida no Kioku" "Katagoshi no Sora"	True Tears 5-shūnen Kinen CD-BOX	Theme songs to True Tears anime series.	
2013	"Sakurairo"	Ima Sugu Oniichan ni Imouto da tte Iitai! Vocal Album	Theme song to the Ima Sugu Oniichan ni Imouto da tte Iitai! visual novel.	
2013	"Sympathetic World" "Kimi no Inryoku" "Paslaptis"	Koitabi: True Tours Nanto Ongaku-shū	Theme songs to the Koitabi: True Tours Nanto anime shorts.	
2015	"Glowing World (Kagayaki no, Sekai e)" "Aletheia (Crimson ver.)" "Kimi no Aeta kara (World's end love will last forever)"	Akai Hitomi ni Utsuru Sekai Original Soundtrack Plus	Theme songs to Akai Hitomi ni Utsuru Sekai visual novel.	
2016	"Hajimari no Oto" "Smile! Smile! Fine!"	"Hajimari no Oto"	Theme songs to Dōshitemo Eto ni wa Hairitai anime series.	

=== Various artist compilation albums ===
Year	Song	Album	Notes	Ref.
2009	"Idea"	Lantis 10th Anniversary Best 090927		
2012	"Reflectier"	Heart of Magic Garden	Remix version by Masumi Itō on a self tribute album anthology of Lantis artists.	

== Other video album appearances ==
Year	Songs	Video album	Artists	Notes	Ref.
2005	"Habataku Mirai" "Yawarakai Kaze no Naka de"	Futakoi Valentine Panic	Various artists	Eufonius participated as guest performers.	

== Notes and references ==
- ^{A} These albums and singles were released independently.

General

- "Eufonius Official Site Works" (in Japanese). Eufonius.

Specific
