= List of Clannad episodes =

Clannad anime series regular edition DVD compilation volume 1, featuring the heroine Nagisa Furukawa.

The Clannad animated television series is based on the visual novel Clannad by the Japanese visual novel brand Key. The episodes, produced by the animation studio Kyoto Animation, are directed by Tatsuya Ishihara, written by Fumihiko Shimo, and features character design by Kazumi Ikeda who based the designs on Itaru Hinoue's original concept. The story follows the main character Tomoya Okazaki, a discontented high school student whose life changes when he meets a girl one year older than he is, named Nagisa Furukawa.

The Clannad anime series has 24 episodes, 23 of which were originally broadcast between October 2007 and March 2008. The last episode was released as an original video animation (OVA) on the eighth DVD in July 2008. The anime series was released in a set of eight DVD compilations in Japan released between December 2007 and July 2008 by Pony Canyon, with each compilation containing three episodes. The license holding company Sentai Filmworks licensed the Clannad anime series, and Section23 Films localized and distributed the television series and the OVA starting with the first half season box set consisting of 12 episodes with English subtitles, Japanese audio, and no English language track, which was released in March 2009. The second half season box set containing the remaining episodes was released in May 2009. Sentai Filmworks and Section23 Films released the entire first season, including the OVA, in a complete collection set featuring an English dub on June 15, 2010.

A continuation of the first anime series titled Clannad After Story produced by the same staff as with the first series, and containing the same cast of voice actors, adapts the After Story arc from the Clannad visual novel, which is a continuation of Nagisa's scenario. Clannad After Story has 25 episodes, 24 of which aired in Japan between October 2008 and March 2009. The last episode was again released as an OVA on the eighth DVD in July 2009. The episodes were released on eight DVD compilation volumes between December 2008 and July 2009. Sentai Filmworks also licensed Clannad After Story and Section23 Films localized and distributed the television series and OVA starting with the first half season box set with English subtitles released in October 2009. The second half season box set containing the remaining episodes was released in December 2009. Sentai Filmworks re-released Clannad After Story with an English dub on April 19, 2011.

Aside from the theme music used for the episodes, the rest of the soundtrack for both anime series is sampled from several albums released for the Clannad visual novel including the Clannad Original Soundtrack, Mabinogi, -Memento-, Sorarado, and Sorarado Append. The cover art for Sorarado Append is also visible as the last shot in the ending video animation of the first season. This includes four insert songs used within the first season's episodes which include: "Kaze no Shōjo" (風の少女, Maiden of the Wind) and "Ana" used in episode nine, "Over" (オーバー, Ōbā) used in episode 18, and "-Kage Futatsu-" (-影二つ-, -Two Shadows-) used in episode 22 which is also the main ending theme from the visual novel.

== Clannad ==
Of the 24 episodes planned for release by Kyoto Animation, 23 were aired on television with the first 22 being regular episodes, followed by an additional extra episode. The last episode was released as an original video animation on the eighth DVD on July 16, 2008, and is set in an alternate universe from the anime series in which Tomoya and Tomoyo are dating. The OVA episode was previewed on May 31, 2008, for an audience of four-hundred people picked via a mail-in postcard campaign. The broadcast time was first announced on August 11, 2007, at the TBS festival Anime Festa, which is also when the first episode was showcased. The episodes aired between October 4, 2007, and March 27, 2008, on the TBS Japanese television network in 4:3 aspect ratio. The anime also aired in 16:9 aspect ratio between October 26, 2007, and April 4, 2008, on the BS-i Japanese television network. The anime series was released in a set of eight DVD compilations in Japan released between December 19, 2007, and July 16, 2008, by Pony Canyon, with each compilation containing three episodes. A Blu-ray Disc box set of Clannad was released on April 30, 2010, in Japan.

The license holding company Sentai Filmworks licensed the Clannad anime series, and Section23 Films localized and distributed the television series and the OVA starting with the first half-season box set consisting of 12 episodes with English subtitles, Japanese audio, and no English language track, which was released on March 3, 2009. The second half season box set containing the remaining episodes was released on May 5, 2009. A complete box set of Clannad was released on June 15, 2010, featuring a new English dub of the series.

Two pieces of theme music are used for the episodes: one opening theme and one ending theme. The opening theme is "Mag Mell (cuckool mix 2007)" (メグメル〜cuckool mix 2007〜) by the Japanese music group Eufonius. This song is a remix of "Mag Mell" (メグメル, Megu Meru), the opening theme used for the original visual novel. The ending theme is "Dango Daikazoku" (だんご大家族, A Big Dango Family) by the Japanese singer Chata. "Dango Daikazoku" is an adaptation of "Nagisa" (渚), Nagisa's character theme from the visual novel, which was also adapted into "Chiisana Tenohira" (小さなてのひら, Small Palms), the ending theme of the After Story arc of the visual novel.

No.	Title	Directed by	Written by	Original air date	U.S. air date
1	"On The Hillside Path Where The Cherry Blossoms Flutter"; Transliteration: "Sakura Maichiru Sakamichi de" (Japanese: 桜舞い散る坂道で)	Tatsuya Ishihara	Fumihiko Shimo	October 4, 2007	March 5, 2009
On the way to Hikarizaka High School, Tomoya Okazaki, a delinquent third-year student wishing for change in his life, meets a strange girl named Nagisa Furukawa talking to herself on the hill. Throughout the day, he is introduced to many of the main female characters; Kyou Fujibayashi and her sister Ryou Fujibayashi, astounded by their personalities. Later in the day, Tomoya has a conversation with Nagisa during lunch and learns that she is repeating her last year of high school, due to being absent too much because of illness, and wants to join the now-disbanded drama club. They watch a female transfer student beat up two guys on motorbikes. After school, Tomoya goes to Nagisa's family bakery and meets her eccentric parents, Akio Furukawa and Sanae Furukawa; he is invited to have dinner with them.
2	"The First Step"; Transliteration: "Saisho no Ippo" (Japanese: 最初の一歩)	Noriyuki Kitanohara	Fumihiko Shimo	October 11, 2007	March 12, 2009
Nagisa admits to wanting to restart the drama club, and Tomoya helps Nagisa to create recruiting posters (with the big Dango family mascot) which they place around the school. At school that day, Tomoya meets two other girls: a strange genius named Kotomi Ichinose who he finds hard to receive attention from, and a first-year named Fuko Ibuki, whom he finds alone in a classroom making a star-shaped wood carving. Tomoya confiscates her knife when she accidentally hurts her hand with it. Later that day, Nagisa finds out Tomoya used to play basketball and invites him to play a game the next day. However, it rains the following day, and Tomoya, along with his friend Youhei Sunohara who used to play soccer, skip school by staying at the dormitory. Worrying that Nagisa might be out in the rain due to her basketball invitation, Tomoya decides to go out. There, it is revealed that his father Naoyuki Okazaki injured Tomoya's shoulder in a fight; as a result, he is unable to play basketball anymore. As Nagisa expresses her regret, she faints in the rain.
3	"Once Again After Crying"; Transliteration: "Namida no Ato ni Mō Ichido" (Japanese: 涙のあとにもう一度)	Yoshiji Kigami	Fumihiko Shimo	October 18, 2007	March 19, 2009
After the previous night's events, Tomoya goes to see if Nagisa is okay and finds out that she has been physically weak all her life. While walking back from the bakery, Tomoya helps get a strange electrician out of a jam and he gives Tomoya his card, finding his name to be Yusuke Yoshino; Youhei later reveals that Yusuke is a retired professional musician. The next day, Nagisa returns to school and talks with Tomoya, who then gives Fuko her knife back. Tomoya and Youhei discover a baby boar named Botan who turns out to be Kyou's pet. After school, Nagisa and Tomoya meet Yukine Miyazawa, a second-year student who is in charge of the library's reference room. Tomoya helps Nagisa get more self-confidence for the drama club by acting as a new member of the club asking questions.
4	"Let's Find Friends"; Transliteration: "Nakama o Sagasō" (Japanese: 仲間をさがそう)	Tatsuya Ishihara	Fumihiko Shimo	October 25, 2007	March 26, 2009
Tomoya runs into Fuko again at school, and she tries to invite him to her older sister's upcoming marriage ceremony, but Tomoya is not interested. Tomoya gets Youhei to help reform the drama club by bribing him with bread from Nagisa's family bakery. Nagisa tries to get the help of Kyou and her sister Ryou in reforming the drama club, and Tomoya even tries to ask Tomoyo Sakagami (after Youhei fights her) and Kotomi if they would like to join; Tomoyo is trying to become student council president, and Kotomi does not give an answer. Tomoya and Nagisa later go see Fuko about the club, and he discovers from Nagisa that Fuko, who is supposedly unconscious in a hospital due to a car accident, is the younger sister of Kouko Ibuki who was Nagisa's art teacher.
5	"The Scenery With A Carving"; Transliteration: "Chōkoku no Aru Fūkei" (Japanese: 彫刻のある風景)	Tomoe Aratani	Fumihiko Shimo	November 1, 2007	April 5, 2009
Tomoya and Nagisa went to meet Kouko. To help the astral Fuko out, Tomoya and Nagisa take her to stay at Nagisa's house and hold back on the drama club for the time being. Nagisa's family helps with carving more starfish out of wood and at school Tomoya and Nagisa help with passing them out to students, and Fuko's friend Mitsui. Later, Fuko talks about how she has wanted to attend classes but has never been able to. Tomoya makes arrangements with Youhei, Kyou, and Ryou to act as classmates in Fuko's very first high school class, and even Sanae comes to act as the teacher.
6	"The Older And Younger Sister's Founder's Festival"; Transliteration: "Ane to Imōto no Sōritsushasai" (Japanese: 姉と妹の創立者祭)	Noriko Takao	Fumihiko Shimo	November 8, 2007	April 12, 2009
After Golden Week, Tomoya and Nagisa invite Kouko to the Founder's Festival, after seeing Kouko's fiancé is none other than Yusuke Yoshino. In the meantime, Fuko hands out more carved starfish to students at the festival, and her fan club helps spread the word about Kouko's wedding as well. Nagisa and Tomoya meet Tomoyo, who is wearing a bear suit to find people who are causing trouble and manages to knock Youhei out a window for bothering a girl. Kouko finally comes to the festival and sees Tomoya and Nagisa, but she cannot see or hear her sister, who is beside them.
7	"Star-Shaped Feelings"; Transliteration: "Hoshigata no Kimochi" (Japanese: 星形の気持ち)	Noriyuki Kitanohara	Fumihiko Shimo	November 15, 2007	April 19, 2009
Tomoya and Nagisa convince Kouko that Fuko would wish for her to marry Yusuke despite Fuko's condition. They talk to the school's administration after finding out Kouko would like to get married on the school grounds. Later, Kouko informs them that Fuko's condition has gotten worse, and she may not awaken from her coma. When Tomoya meets with Youhei at the dormitory, he shares his observation earlier at school that some students cannot see Fuko while others are beginning to forget her existence and the presents she gave them.
8	"The Wind That Vanishes Into The Twilight"; Transliteration: "Tasogare ni Kieru Kaze" (Japanese: 黄昏に消える風)	Taichi Ishidate	Fumihiko Shimo	November 22, 2007	April 26, 2009
Increasingly fewer students are able to see Fuko anymore and now even those close to Fuko in the past are beginning to forget about her. First, Youhei forgets after he goes to see her in the hospital, followed by Kyou and Ryou. Tomoyo manages to remember with Tomoya's help, however. Later, Youhei manages to remember Fuko for a moment but is unable to remember anymore. Tomoya and Nagisa buy Fuko a birthday party set to cheer her up. When they get back to the bakery, they discover that Akio has forgotten Fuko, and while Sanae has not forgotten completely, she cannot see her anymore. Tomoya and Nagisa decide to take Fuko back to school for now.
9	"Until The End Of The Dream"; Transliteration: "Yume no Saigo Made" (Japanese: 夢の最後まで)	Yoshiji Kigami	Fumihiko Shimo	November 29, 2007	May 3, 2009
Tomoya, Nagisa and Fuko spend the night at school having a pre-celebration for Kouko's wedding, as the two and Fuko become closer. The next morning, Tomoya and Nagisa have forgotten about Fuko and cannot see her. Both Tomoya and Nagisa later feel that there is something important that they are forgetting, and finally remember about Kouko's wedding, which is also when they are able to see Fuko again. On the wedding day, initially, the only students to arrive were Tomoya, Nagisa, and Fuko, but after the ceremony it is shown that everyone who had received a starfish came to the wedding. Kouko and Yusuke walk down the campus as everyone applauds them. Fuko ultimately disappears afterwards, thanking Tomoya and Nagisa and congratulating her older sister. A rumor still persists at the school of Fuko as a cute girl who is constantly running through the school. Tomoya believes Fuko will awaken someday.
10	"The Girl Genius' Challenge"; Transliteration: "Tensai Shōjo no Chōsen" (Japanese: 天才少女の挑戦)	Yasuhiro Takemoto	Fumihiko Shimo	December 6, 2007	May 10, 2009
Since no new members have joined the drama club, Tomoya goes to talk with Kotomi once again about joining. Tomoya takes her around the school and helps her introduce herself to people to make more friends. Tomoya takes Kyou, Ryou, and Kotomi to the drama room after school, and after a round of introductions, he asks them to join the club. Kyou initially passes on the chance but ends up giving in after her sister says she wants to join, and Kotomi joins as well. During the meeting, Kotomi suddenly leaves when she hears someone playing the violin in a nearby club room. Yet when she is offered a chance to play it, she is painfully horrible.
11	"The After School Rhapsody"; Transliteration: "Hōkago no Kyōsōkyoku" (Japanese: 放課後の狂想曲)	Tomoe Aratani	Fumihiko Shimo	December 13, 2007	May 17, 2009
Kotomi is still trying to play the violin, but has not improved at all; in short, her playing is painful to anyone listening. Kyou gets the idea to have Kotomi play at her first violin recital after school in two days, obliging Kotomi to practice in the meantime. The day before the recital, Tomoya visits Kotomi at the school's library and eats her delicious homemade apple pie. Shortly after, Tomoya falls asleep and has a very strange dream. At the recital, the school; including Akio, Sanae, and Misae Sagara; the landlady of Youhei's dorm came to listen. Kyou blackmails several students into coming with her position as a class representative. In the end, Kotomi did not improve at all, and the recital was still very painful to listen to. When Kotomi and her friends are going home, a strange man approaches Kotomi, though leaves shortly after. Kotomi was terrified of him, stating that he is a "bad man".
12	"Hidden World"; Transliteration: "Kakusareta Sekai" (Japanese: かくされた世界)	Noriko Takao	Fumihiko Shimo	December 20, 2007	May 24, 2009
Kotomi returns the violin to Rie Nishina and becomes friends with her. Kotomi changes her usual routine and starts attending her classes. Kyou invites Tomoya, Nagisa, Kotomi, and Ryou to go out together as a group and have fun at a local carnival. While they are at a claw crane, Fuko makes an appearance, but no one seems to remember her. The next day, Nagisa runs up to Kyou thinking Ryou got in a bus accident, though when they rush to the scene, they find no one was hurt; however when Kotomi sees the accident, she has an emotional episode and collapses while screaming out. Kotomi leaves early that day, but when Tomoya, Nagisa, Kyou, and Ryou go to see her later, there is no answer at her house. After they leave, Tomoya goes back and runs into the strange man from earlier; he finds out the gentleman is an acquaintance of Kotomi's parents. Tomoya ends up going into Kotomi's house and finds her in a room with newspaper clippings on the wall reporting on the death of Kotomi's parents. Tomoya then finally remembers that he met Kotomi years ago when he was a child.
13	"Garden of Memories"; Transliteration: "Omoide no Niwa o" (Japanese: 思い出の庭を)	Noriyuki Kitanohara	Fumihiko Shimo	January 10, 2008	May 31, 2009
Tomoya realizes that he met Kotomi as a child, though until now only she had remembered. Back then, Tomoya had often visited Kotomi and was her only friend. Around this time on Kotomi's birthday, her parents suddenly must leave for a business trip. Later that day, Kotomi is visited by an acquaintance of her parents (the gentleman) who tells her that they were killed in a plane crash. Kotomi ultimately ends up burning her father's important thesis about discovering 'Another World' before anyone could see it. From then on, Tomoya stops coming to her house, as Kotomi dedicates herself to follow her parents' footsteps. While Kotomi shuts herself in her house, Tomoya comes over and starts cleaning up the overgrown garden before her birthday. Nagisa, Kyou, and Ryou eventually help out as well. In the end, Kotomi is happy with everyone's generosity.
14	"Theory of Everything"	Taichi Ishidate	Fumihiko Shimo	January 17, 2008	June 7, 2009
Kotomi finally leaves the house to find that Tomoya worked in the garden all night long and had fallen asleep. When she returns to school, Tomoya, Nagisa, Kyou, and Ryou are all waiting for her. The mysterious gentleman whom she was so frightened of, believing he wanted to take her parents' thesis, is there as well. Kotomi and her friends find out that he is her legal guardian, and that there never were any other copy notes for the thesis after all. The envelope Kotomi burned and felt so guilty about was actually a teddy bear catalog. The gentleman also has a birthday gift for her, which is her parents' suitcase, that survived the plane crash and was passed from hand to hand around the world for years until he found it. Inside is a teddy bear, Kotomi's gift request to her parents before they left, and an affectionate letter. While Kotomi is holding the teddy bear, the room fills with orbs of light, and she, at last, makes peace with her parents' deaths.
15	"Stuck Problem"; Transliteration: "Komatta Mondai" (Japanese: 困った問題)	Mitsuyoshi Yoneda	Fumihiko Shimo	January 24, 2008	June 14, 2009
To help Nagisa reform the drama club, her friends offer their names to get enough members to qualify, but they still need an advisor with them for the club, which leads them to ask Toshio Koumura. However, he is already meant to be the advisor for the choir club, so Nagisa goes to talk with Rie about which club Koumura should advise. The next day, Nagisa finds a threatening letter on her desk, and Youhei finds out that it was Rie's friend Sugisaka who is behind it. After talking with Nagisa about Rie's past, Nagisa chooses to give up on reforming the drama club, though this does not sit well with Youhei and Kyou. Tomoya and Youhei go to Yukine to kill time during school, and Yukine gives Youhei an idea related to basketball. Later on, two captains of the judo club are pestering Tomoyo to join. Fuko appears but not too much help, yet Tomoya manages to take Tomoyo with him to get away from the captains. The next day, Youhei approaches Tomoya and Nagisa about playing in a basketball match to get the choir club to back down, but Tomoya continuously refuses his offer. After school, Tomoya and Nagisa meet Youhei's younger sister Mei Sunohara.
16	"3 on 3"	Yasuhiro Takemoto	Fumihiko Shimo	January 31, 2008	June 21, 2009
When Mei shows up, she cleans her brother's filthy room, but Misae said she cannot stay at Youhei's all-boys dorm, so Nagisa offers to have her stay at her home while she is in town. Tomoya and Youhei easily get Kyou to help with the basketball game, and she gets pumped up after a comment about pairing up with such loser guys. They bring the choir club over to watch the game. For half the game, Tomoya and the others play against first-year rookies and manage to lead by eleven points, but then the basketball team switches with their starters, and the scores even out. In the very last seconds of the game, Tomoya manages to make the last shot thanks to Nagisa's voice, and wins the game. Afterward, Mei goes back to her hometown.
17	"A Room Without Anyone"; Transliteration: "Fuzai no Kūkan" (Japanese: 不在の空間)	Naoko Yamada	Fumihiko Shimo	February 7, 2008	June 28, 2009
After watching the basketball game, the choir club decide to share Koumura with the drama club, but the student council will not allow it. Nagisa collapses at school and is absent for a few days following. Then, Tomoya believes if Tomoyo becomes student council president she can make arrangements and revive the drama club. During this time, Tomoyo starts waking up Tomoya and Youhei before classes start so they will not be late anymore. Kyou continues to set up situations where Tomoya and Ryou are together, such as eating lunch together. Yukine tries to help Tomoya with a grimoire, and he casts a spell to get locked in the gym equipment room with Kyou, which ends up happening. Kyou does not act like her usual self while in the room and wrongly concludes that Tomoya may try to have sex with her. Tomoya undoes the spell and the door is opened by one of Kyou's classmates. Tomoya and Tomoyo start to walk home after school, but a bunch of gang members is at the school's entrance looking to fight Tomoyo. Fuko temporarily interrupts the fight. After the fight starts, teachers from the school arrive and break it up; Tomoya takes the blame for it to protect Tomoyo, and is sentenced to suspension as a consequence.
18	"Counter Measures"; Transliteration: "Gyakuten no Hisaku" (Japanese: 逆転の秘策)	Noriko Takao	Fumihiko Shimo	February 14, 2008	July 5, 2009
During the time that Tomoya is suspended from school, Tomoyo continues to come to his house, wake him up, and make him breakfast, though when she tries to ask him about his relationship with Naoyuki, he does not answer her. On Sunday, when Tomoyo is making him lunch, Kotomi, Kyou, and Ryou arrive each bringing a bunch of food, and even Fuko appears with food; Tomoya ends up eating everything. Once back at school, he finds out how Tomoyo's reputation is dropping due to rumors of her as a gang leader and arranges for Tomoyo to compete against several school sports clubs to boost her reputation. After school, Tomoyo tells Tomoya about her family situation and how her brother risked his life to keep their parents from divorcing, and desire to protect the cherry blossom trees. Nagisa finally comes back to school and is welcomed by her friends. During a tennis match between Tomoyo and a male tennis club member, a stray ball hits Nagisa on the leg, and Tomoya overprotects her, showing everyone how devoted he is to her. Tomoyo realizes that Tomoya is in love with Nagisa, and both Kyou and Ryou break into tears. Ultimately, Tomoyo becomes the student council president.
19	"A New Life"; Transliteration: "Atarashii Seikatsu" (Japanese: 新しい生活)	Noriyuki Kitanohara	Fumihiko Shimo	February 28, 2008	July 12, 2009
The drama club is finally revived and Koumura is shared with the choir club, thanks to Tomoyo. Tomoya's homeroom teacher goes to Tomoya's house to ask Naoyuki about his son's future, but Naoyuki says that it is something Tomoya has to decide for himself. Seeing the way Tomoya and Naoyuki are, Nagisa offers to have Tomoya stay over at her house for the time being, which he accepts. After coming home from school, Tomoya finds several small kids in Nagisa's house and finds out Sanae is instructing them in a cram school. Nagisa confides to Tomoya that she feels she did something really bad to her parents in the past, but she cannot remember what it is, and her parents say that she must be imagining it.
20	"A Hidden Past"; Transliteration: "Himerareta Kako" (Japanese: 秘められた過去)	Taichi Ishidate	Fumihiko Shimo	March 6, 2008	July 19, 2009
After hearing Nagisa talk about the story of the "Girl in the Illusionary World" for the play she wants to perform, Tomoya tries asking Nagisa's parents and Yukine about it (which seems familiar to him), but they do not know any story like that; Fuko appears unexpectedly. After Akio catches Tomoya and Nagisa in the shed, he tells them to leave, and later brings Tomoya aside to tell him about what happened in the past. Ten years prior, Nagisa was running a high fever one snowy day, and in the midst of this, her parents had to work, so they left her alone for a couple of hours. When Akio returned, he found Nagisa collapsed outside as she had been waiting for them to return. Due to Nagisa nearly dying, both of her parents abandoned their jobs and their dreams to protect Nagisa. Akio tells Tomoya not to tell either Sanae or Nagisa about the story since he does not want it coming up again. Tomoya goes on a picnic with Nagisa's family, and during a baseball game with some local young boys, Nagisa accidentally confesses her love to Tomoya indirectly.
21	"Face Toward The School Festival"; Transliteration: "Gakuensai ni Mukete" (Japanese: 学園祭に向けて)	Mitsuyoshi Yoneda	Fumihiko Shimo	March 13, 2008	July 26, 2009
Nagisa and her friends continue to practice for the play, such as reciting tongue twisters, choosing which music to use for the play, lighting, and stage direction. Akio rents a play on a video, and Nagisa finds it very touching, plus it was the first play she ever saw. Tomoya and Akio try to find the script of the play that Nagisa is going to perform in the shed but do not find it. The drama club has a practice the day before the school festival is to begin and it goes well. The night before the school festival, Nagisa looks for a flashlight in the shed, but bumps into some boxes and discovers photographs and diaries of her parents' pasts.
22	"Two Shadows"; Transliteration: "Kage Futatsu" (Japanese: 影二つ)	Yasuhiro Takemoto	Fumihiko Shimo	March 20, 2008	August 2, 2009
After Nagisa finds out about her parents' secret past, she cannot take her mind off how she ruined their dreams and becomes emotional and depressed. On the day of the school festival, the whole drama club realizes that Nagisa is not herself, and tries to cheer her up, but to no success. As the performance starts, Nagisa breaks down, but with encouragement from Akio, who said that his dream, as well as that of Sanae, was for Nagisa to make her dream come true, Tomoya also assures Nagisa, and the play about the Girl in the Illusionary World was a huge success! Naoyuki came to see them play too. The next day as the sun is setting; Tomoya finally confesses his love to Nagisa in the club room. This comes as a shock for Nagisa, causing her to cry tears of joy.
23	"The Events Of Summer Holidays"; Transliteration: "Natsuyasumi no Dekigoto" (Japanese: 夏休みの出来事)	Naoko Yamada	Fumihiko Shimo	March 27, 2008	August 9, 2009
It is now during summer vacation, but despite now having been going out for weeks, both Tomoya and Nagisa are still very nervous about it and have not done much to progress their relationship which comes as a shock to their friends. Mei comes back for another visit and helps out with the bakery. After learning of Tomoya and Nagisa's current stagnant relationship, Mei decides to be their personal cupid of love to advance things along. Mei thinks up a whole plan which Nagisa attempts to follow despite it being very embarrassing for her at times. After Tomoya calls Mei out, she runs away, though Nagisa stops Tomoya from chasing after her. With some time left in the day, Tomoya and Nagisa take a walk together while finally holding hands.
OVA	"Another World: Tomoyo Chapter"; Transliteration: "Mō Hitotsu no Sekai Tomoyo-hen" (Japanese: もうひとつの世界 智代編)	Noriko Takao	Fumihiko Shimo	July 16, 2008	August 16, 2009
In an alternative timeline where Tomoya and Tomoyo are dating, Tomoyo becomes student council president, but bad rumors start around the school due to Tomoya's bad reputation. Tomoyo becomes busy during the school festival and continues to be so while she attempts to save the cherry blossom trees in town. A male student (Yuji Suehara) makes Tomoya realize that he is holding Tomoyo back from greater things, and despite both sides being reluctant, they break up. Time passes as Tomoyo's reputation builds and Tomoya and Youhei watch on the side through her many accomplishments, one of them being ultimately saving the cherry blossom trees by the winter. While on the way home after attending his high school graduation ceremony, Tomoya sees Tomoyo waiting for him along the snowy road lined by the cherry trees. They talk for the first time in months. From Tomoya's view, his expectation is that their lives have diverged, never to come together again, but he is surprised when Tomoyo expresses her desire to be with him again. Tomoya tries to dissuade her from making that choice, but her mind is made up; she would rather be with him. Tomoya and Tomoyo become a couple again.

== Clannad After Story ==
A continuation of the first anime series titled Clannad After Story produced by the same staff as with the first series, and containing the same cast of voice actors, adapts the After Story arc from the Clannad visual novel, which is a continuation of Nagisa's scenario. The second season aired in Japan between October 3, 2008, and March 26, 2009, on TBS in 4:3 aspect ratio with 24 episodes. Of the 24 episodes, 22 are regular episodes, the 23 is an extra episode, and the last episode is a summary episode showcasing highlights from the series. Clannad After Story also aired in 16:9 aspect ratio starting on October 24, 2008. The episodes were released on eight DVD compilation volumes between December 3, 2008, and July 1, 2009. The eighth DVD volume came with an additional original video animation (OVA) episode set in an alternate universe from the anime series where Tomoya and Kyou are dating. The OVA episode was previewed on May 24, 2009, for a limited number of people.

The license holding company Sentai Filmworks licensed the Clannad After Story anime series, and Section23 Films localized and distributed the television series and the OVA starting with the first half season box set consisting of 12 episodes with English subtitles, Japanese audio, and no English language track, released on October 20, 2009. The second half season box set containing the remaining episodes was released on December 8, 2009. Sentai Filmworks re-released Clannad After Story with an English dub in April 2011.

Two pieces of theme music are used for the episodes; one opening theme and one ending theme. The opening theme is "Toki o Kizamu Uta" (時を刻む唄, A Song to Pass the Time) which goes by the same tune as the background music track "Onaji Takami e" (同じ高みへ, To the Same Heights). The ending theme is "Torch", and both the opening and ending themes are sung by Lia.

No. overall	No. in season	Title	Directed by	Written by	Original air date
24	1	"The Goodbye at the End of Summer"; Transliteration: "Natsu no Owari no Sayonara" (Japanese: 夏の終わりのサヨナラ)	Tatsuya Ishihara; Mitsuyoshi Yoneda	Fumihiko Shimo	October 3, 2008
Tomoya Okazaki dreams about his past as he, his girlfriend Nagisa Furukawa and her mother watch Akio Furukawa play baseball. Summer vacation is now over and the second semester has started. Akio asks Tomoya to form a baseball team for a local game against the neighboring shopping district team. Tomoya is able to recruit Kyou Fujibayashi and Kotomi Ichinose from the drama club, Youhei Sunohara and his younger sister Mei Sunohara, as well as Tomoyo Sakagami, Misae Sagara, and Yusuke Yoshino. Tomoya's team manages to get an early lead, but Akio's leg gets injured by a flying bat, and Nagisa fills in for her father as the pitcher. The other team catches up near the end, and it comes down to the final inning when Tomoya scores an RBI, winning the game.
25	2	"Search for False Love"; Transliteration: "Itsuwari no Ai o Sagashite" (Japanese: いつわりの愛をさがして)	Taichi Ishidate	Fumihiko Shimo	October 10, 2008
Mei has become worried about her older brother Youhei since he still does not have a plan after high school and comes to stay at Nagisa's for the time being. Based on a fleeting comment by Youhei, Tomoya gets the idea to ask a girl to pose as his girlfriend so Mei will stop worrying about him. Youhei goes around with Tomoya and Nagisa asking Kotomi, Tomoyo, Ryou Fujibayashi, and Yukine Miyazawa, but no one can help him. Sanae Furukawa overhears Youhei's trouble and decides to be his fake girlfriend if it will help push him in the right direction in life. Youhei, however, still believes her to be the older sister, instead of the mother, of Nagisa. When Mei meets her brother's so-called girlfriend, Sanae is posing as a student from Tomoya's high school.
26	3	"Disagreeing Hearts"; Transliteration: "Surechigau Kokoro" (Japanese: すれちがう心)	Naoko Yamada	Fumihiko Shimo	October 17, 2008
Youhei and Sanae go out on a date, accompanied by Tomoya, Nagisa, and Mei. However, Mei still feels that her brother is hopeless even with a dependable girlfriend, and thus still worries about him. Mei remembers that her brother used to be much nicer and worried about her in the past when Mei would get picked on. In an attempt to provoke a brotherly response out of Youhei, Mei lies about coming to the city to meet a guy she likes, and Tomoya later pretends in front of Youhei that he is that person. Despite being shocked in both instances, Youhei does not say anything to Mei. Since she cannot leave while things are the way they are, Mei continues to stay for the time being.
27	4	"With the Same Smile as That Day"; Transliteration: "Ano Hi to Onaji Egao de" (Japanese: あの日と同じ笑顔で)	Mitsuyoshi Yoneda	Fumihiko Shimo	October 24, 2008
Youhei has not been coming to class lately, causing worry among his friends as well as his sister. Visiting Yukine in the library, Tomoya tells how Youhei quit soccer because of older teammates' bullying. Tomoya, Nagisa, and Mei visit the soccer club, and they try to convince them to let Youhei rejoin. After a grueling task of fetching soccer balls, the club still will not let Youhei back on the team. While the leader of the soccer team makes Mei cry and picks on her, Youhei storms in and starts beating up the entire soccer club with the help of Tomoya. After the soccer club members leave, Tomoya and Youhei have another fight about the protection of Mei. Youhei finally admits he was worried about Mei, and the fight is resolved after Nagisa and Mei interject. The next day; after Mei returns home, Tomoya and Youhei laugh together on the way to school, and Youhei finds out Sanae is Nagisa's mother. Tomoya later recounts to himself how he and Youhei first met.
28	5	"The Season You Were In"; Transliteration: "Kimi no Ita Kisetsu" (Japanese: 君のいた季節)	Noriyuki Kitanohara	Fumihiko Shimo	October 31, 2008
Tomoya and Nagisa visit Youhei, and spend some time talking with Misae and Tomoyo who comes over after them. Later, when Tomoya and Nagisa are talking with Misae privately about the autumn festival, Tomoya starts falling asleep. It is shown how Misae was a third-year in high school, she met a strange boy named Katsuki Shima who says he can grant her one wish in return for her cheering him up years before when he was in the hospital. Misae has a boy she likes named Igarashi, but unknown to her already has a girlfriend. Igarashi asks Katsuki to tell her this, but he cannot tell her directly and starts crying. Misae sees Igarashi with his girlfriend, and realizes the truth; she runs away, leaving Katsuki behind.
29	6	"Forever By Your Side"; Transliteration: "Zutto Anata no Soba ni" (Japanese: ずっとあなたのそばに)	Kazuya Sakamoto	Fumihiko Shimo	November 7, 2008
After getting over Igarashi, Misae starts hanging out with Katsuki more and starts falling in love with him. Katsuki sneaks into the school to see how Misae doing with her duties as student council president. One day, Katsuki realizes after going to his house with two of Misae's friends, Saki and Yuki, that he is in fact not Katsuki Shima, but a cat who was sent by the dying Katsuki Shima to grant Misae's wish. At the autumn festival, Misae confesses she has come to love Katsuki, but that night he disappears shortly after Misae made her wish for him to always be with her. After Tomoya wakes up, he realizes the cat showed him all this. Later, everyone goes to the autumn festival. Tomoya takes Nagisa there as their date when the cat and Misae show up. Tomoya then tells Misae some things Katsuki did not get a chance to tell her. An orb of light, much like the one Katsuki claimed to possess that supposedly grants a single wish, appears in the night sky.
30	7	"Her Whereabouts"; Transliteration: "Kanojo no Ibasho" (Japanese: 彼女の居場所)	Kazuya Sakamoto	Fumihiko Shimo	November 14, 2008
Tomoya, Nagisa, and Youhei discover that Yukine is respected by the two rival gangs in the city since she helps both sides' members after they get hurt. Her older brother Kazuto Miyazawa is the leader of one of the gangs, and a young boy named Yū comes to her to find his older sister who apparently is dating a guy in Kazuto's gang. Youhei pretends to Yū that he is Yukine's brother for the time being, but the truth is later revealed after Yukine takes Yū, along with Tomoya, Nagisa, and Youhei, to a bar where her brother's gang hangs out. Kazuto has been in the hospital since he got into a car accident when he saved a friend. While heading home, three members of the rival gang mistaken Youhei for Kazuto and try to fight him and Tomoya, but Tomoyo intervenes, stopping them single-handedly.
31	8	"Valiant Fight"; Transliteration: "Yūki Aru Tatakai" (Japanese: 勇気ある戦い)	Taichi Ishidate	Fumihiko Shimo	November 21, 2008
Tomoyo speaks to Yukine and the others about hearing the police will start to get involved in the fight between the two gangs gets any worse. Trying to stave off a major brawl due to a misunderstanding, Yukine goes with Tomoya to try to talk the other gang out of a fight, and the leader settles on a fight between him and Yukine's brother Kazuto. Youhei reluctantly goes to stand in for Kazuto but is incapacitated along with everyone else after eating Sanae's bread. So Tomoya, who did not eat the bread, fights the leader of the opposing gang. Yukine impersonates Kazuto to end the fighting and finally reveals to everyone that did not already know Kazuto has been dead for some time, and his wish was to end the fighting in the town. At the cemetery, Yukine pays respect to her dead brother and the rival gang joins in. With the rivalry resolved and peace restored, Tomoya witnesses an orb of light rising into the sky. Later, Yukine then tells Tomoya, Nagisa, and Youhei about the city's legend of the orbs of light.
32	9	"En Route on the Sloped Road"; Transliteration: "Sakamichi no Tochū" (Japanese: 坂道の途中)	Noriyuki Kitanohara	Fumihiko Shimo	November 28, 2008
Tomoya and his friends are nearing graduation, and are discussing what they will be doing after they graduate. Kyou wishes to be a kindergarten teacher, Ryou hopes to go to a nursing school, Kotomi wants to study in America, and Youhei aspires to be a model. Tomoya still has not decided on what to do yet. Nagisa's sickness returns, making her unable to go to school and take exams, and she will have to repeat her last year of high school again, unfortunately. Tomoya brought a stuffed dango for Nagisa on her birthday while their friends come over for Christmas Eve. On the day of graduation, as Toshio Koumura decided to retire, Tomoya returns home to Nagisa who wishes to take a walk with him, while holding hands.
33	10	"Season of Beginnings"; Transliteration: "Hajimari no Kisetsu" (Japanese: 始まりの季節)	Naoko Yamada	Fumihiko Shimo	December 5, 2008
Shortly after his graduation, Tomoya decides to be more independent, and works toward this goal by first taking up a job at the bakery. Meanwhile, Nagisa has begun her new school year, although she makes few friends and her attempt to re-establish the drama club ends in failure. Tomoya eventually moves out of Nagisa's home to a small apartment of his own; thanks to Ryou, while taking up a job as an electrician with Yusuke. After his first day of work, Tomoya returns to his new home completely exhausted, barely able to stay awake during his dinner with Nagisa.
34	11	"The Promised Founder's Festival"; Transliteration: "Yakusoku no Sōritsushasai" (Japanese: 約束の創立者祭)	Mitsuyoshi Yoneda	Fumihiko Shimo	December 12, 2008
Working has its ups and downs for Tomoya. He does not want his boss to find out that he has an injured shoulder, in fear that he will lose his new job. Yusuke keeps Tomoya's physical disability a secret. Tomoya promises Nagisa that he will join her at the Founder's Festival, yet work gets busy and while his fellow co-workers would have covered for him, he wanted to prove his worth. He is late for his date and is starting to become too busy to sustain a healthy relationship with Nagisa; although she understands him. Resolving his responsibility, Tomoya gains respect with his co-workers and settles into his job.
35	12	"Sudden Events"; Transliteration: "Totsuzen no Dekigoto" (Japanese: 突然の出来事)	Noriko Takao	Fumihiko Shimo	December 19, 2008
Yusuke tells Tomoya a little about his past and how he met Kouko Ibuki in high school. After graduating, Yusuke went on to become a successful singer-songwriter, but ultimately it all came crashing down and he started taking drugs. When he came back to the city and saw Kouko again for the first time in years, he regretted not continuing to sing for her sake. The exciting news is, Tomoya was offered a new position as a manager in a big company, but the deal falls through when his father Naoyuki Okazaki is arrested at bad timing. Tomoya is enraged that his father is still messing up his life. Nagisa manages to calm him down from hurting himself. Tomoya finally proposes to Nagisa, and she accepts.
36	13	"Graduation"; Transliteration: "Sotsugyō" (Japanese: 卒業)	Kazuya Sakamoto	Fumihiko Shimo	January 8, 2009
Tomoya tries to convince Akio to talk to him about his decision to marry Nagisa. Akio, however, will only talk to him if he can get a decent hit with a baseball match. Tomoya continues to practice hitting the ball, even during the heavy downpour, until he gets good enough to face Akio again. He finally hits a home run and runs over to Akio to beg him to let Nagisa be with him, to which Akio agrees. Months later, Christmas time arrives, and as Nagisa turns 20, she has her first drink of sake; when she is drunk, she accuses Tomoya of being attracted to Sanae. Nagisa's fever goes up again, causing her to become absent from school, but not enough to repeat another year. Tomoya soon organizes with some of their friends and previous classmates, including Koumura, to gather at the school and celebrate Nagisa's graduation. Nagisa receives her diploma and finally graduates. Later, they notify Naoyuki and he congratulates them. Tomoya and Nagisa get married afterward while taking a walk on the hill of cherry blossoms.
37	14	"A New Family"; Transliteration: "Atarashii Kazoku" (Japanese: 新しい家族)	Taichi Ishidate	Fumihiko Shimo	January 15, 2009
Tomoya and Nagisa Okazaki are now a married couple living together. Nagisa tries to find work and starts as a waitress at a newly opened family restaurant with Rie Nishina and Sugisaka near the school hill. Tomoya and Akio visit Nagisa at work and scare out a couple of customers who were hitting on Nagisa. Back at home, Nagisa tells Tomoya that the old building of the school they went to is going to be torn down. Knowing that the drama club was in the old building, Tomoya freaks out and admits that he is uncomfortable with all the changes happening in their town. Tomoya and Nagisa visit her parents then Sanae tells them Nagisa is most likely pregnant! Akio gets mad at Tomoya at first, but he congratulates him afterward.
38	15	"In the Remains of Summer"; Transliteration: "Natsu no Nagori ni" (Japanese: 夏の名残に)	Noriyuki Kitanohara	Fumihiko Shimo	January 22, 2009
Everyone congratulates Tomoya on becoming a father soon. Nagisa becomes increasingly bedridden due to morning sickness. Nagisa wants to give birth at home, so Sanae introduces Yagi, a midwife who is to assist in the delivery. Sanae later tells Tomoya that giving birth will be difficult because of Nagisa's weak physique and may even put Nagisa's life at risk, so they might have to choose abortion. However, Sanae leaves the choice up to Tomoya and Nagisa. Nagisa learns of her mother's worries, but she decides to go through with the birth. Akio takes Tomoya to a meadow and tells him more about the day when Nagisa nearly died. Akio carried Nagisa to the meadow and prayed for her life, and Nagisa miraculously regained consciousness. Akio tells Tomoya that while many painful and difficult things will happen, he and Sanae will always be there for Tomoya and Nagisa since they are family. Tomoya and Nagisa take a walk by the river and decide on the name Ushio for their child.
39	16	"White Darkness"; Transliteration: "Shiroi Yami" (Japanese: 白い闇)	Naoko Yamada	Fumihiko Shimo	January 29, 2009
Winter comes as Nagisa enters the final months of her pregnancy and some friends come over for New Year's Day. When Kotomi tells her research about 'Another World', Tomoya spontaneously remembers Nagisa's play. On a heavy snow day, Nagisa becomes sick again and goes into labor two weeks early. Tomoya and her family, unable to transport her to a hospital in time, is forced to have her give birth at home. After an excruciating process, Nagisa successfully gives birth to their daughter, Ushio, but the delivery and her illness combined take their toll on her and Nagisa dies moments after seeing her newborn baby. Tomoya, who has stayed by her side the entire time, is devastated by this cruel twist of fate. His dream of raising their daughter together as a family is shattered.
40	17	"Summer Time"; Transliteration: "Natsujikan" (Japanese: 夏時間)	Mitsuyoshi Yoneda	Fumihiko Shimo	February 5, 2009
Five years later, after leaving Ushio in the care of Akio and Sanae, Tomoya spends his days working long hours, smoking, and drinking. One day, Tomoya and Sanae go out together into town, and she asks him to go with them on a family trip; after Sanae continues to ask him, he accepts. On the day of the trip, he discovers that both Akio and Sanae have left him alone with Ushio. The two spend the next day and night together, but Tomoya finds it difficult to connect with the small child. After Akio and Sanae still do not show up, Tomoya asks Ushio if she would be willing to still go on a trip, even if it was only with a person like him. The two decide to take the trip by themselves and, as they walk, Tomoya wonders where they are headed.
41	18	"The Ends of the Earth"; Transliteration: "Daichi no Hate" (Japanese: 大地の果て)	Noriko Takao	Fumihiko Shimo	February 12, 2009
While on the trip, Tomoya buys a toy robot he picks out for Ushio to play with after they arrive in the countryside. The next day, after staying at an inn the previous night, Tomoya and Ushio take a walk through the area and come across a field of rape blossom. Ushio plays in the field as Tomoya watches, but Ushio soon loses the robot in the field; they try to look for it but to no avail. Remembering something from his past, Tomoya goes off to another area and meets his grandmother Shino Okazaki, his father's mother. She tells Tomoya how he came here with his father shortly after his mother Atsuko Okazaki died, and also how his father worked very hard to support him over the years. Tomoya finally comes to terms with Naoyuki that he is not a bad father. When they go back to the field where Ushio is, she still cannot find the robot and does not want to stop looking because it was the first thing her father ever gave her. Tomoya realizes his previous mistakes and vows to try his best for Ushio from now on, who is very happy at the prospect of being with her father. On the way home, Tomoya starts telling Ushio about Nagisa for the first time, but memories of Nagisa cause him to break down. After being comforted by Ushio, Tomoya realizes how important the two are for each other, and finally embraces his role as Ushio's father.
42	19	"The Road Home"; Transliteration: "Ieji" (Japanese: 家路)	Kazuya Sakamoto	Fumihiko Shimo	February 19, 2009
Tomoya and Ushio came back from their trip together. After spending a night with Nagisa's parents, they leave for Tomoya's apartment, where they will both be living from now on. Sometime later, Tomoya takes a day off from work and the two meet up with Kouko Yoshino, whose sister Fuko Ibuki has finally been released from the hospital. Afterward, Tomoya and Ushio visit Naoyuki. Tomoya manages to convince his father into moving back to the countryside with his mother Shino. While Tomoya and Ushio happily say goodbye to Naoyuki now that his role as a father has come to an end, an orb of light appears and gets absorbed by Tomoya, while only being noticed by Ushio.
43	20	"The Tidal Breeze's Mischief"; Transliteration: "Shiokaze no Tawamure" (Japanese: 汐風の戯れ)	Taichi Ishidate	Fumihiko Shimo	February 26, 2009
When Tomoya brings Ushio to school he meets her teacher, who is none other than Kyou after seeing Botan her pet boar, and the two soon reacquaint themselves. After that, Tomoya goes to work and Yusuke asks him for Fuko to play with Ushio, since they have become friends after all, and Tomoya agrees. When it is time to sleep, Tomoya uses the "Dango Daikazoku" song to lull Ushio to sleep. Fuko arrives at Tomoya's house to play until the evening when she goes back home as she reminds him about Nagisa. The next day, Kyou tells Tomoya about the annual sports day at school where the parents are to participate as well. He is reluctant about it, but Ushio encourages him, which makes him change his mind. One evening, Ushio is taking a stroll to the new hospital by herself and encounters Fuko on her way. When the latter asks why she does this, Ushio says it is for no real reason. The next day, Tomoya is preparing for the meet at the Furukawa bakery, when Ushio is suddenly struck with a fever, much to the others' shock.
44	21	"The End of the World"; Transliteration: "Sekai no Owari" (Japanese: 世界の終わり)	Noriyuki Kitanohara	Fumihiko Shimo	March 5, 2009
Ushio has the same illness as Nagisa's and Tomoya decides to stay home to take care of her. In case he has to leave home, he arranges for both Akio and Sanae to be able to take his place. Ushio asks Tomoya that she wants to go on a trip like last time, but he tells her that it will happen once she gets better. After Tomoya resigns from his job, Yusuke wishes him the best of luck. Akio offers Tomoya some money, but he declines his kindness and Akio states that every man has something to protect. Tomoya believes that Nagisa's and Ushio's lives are somehow linked to the "changing" in the city. After several months, winter arrives and then Christmas. Ushio's fever has still not broken, and Tomoya seems to be getting sick as well. He begins to hallucinate and sees an illusionary world. Ushio once again asks Tomoya to go on a trip, and he ultimately accepts thinking that he might not be able to fulfill another promised wish. After they leave the house and it starts snowing, Ushio's fever worsens. Calmly and serenely, she tells Tomoya that she loves him and dies in his arms. Soon after, Tomoya collapses in grief and supposedly dies of shock, and something strange begins to happen.
45	22	"Small Palms"; Transliteration: "Chiisana Tenohira" (Japanese: 小さな手のひら)	Naoko Yamada	Fumihiko Shimo	March 12, 2009
After failing to create a flying machine to travel to an alternate world, the Girl in the Illusionary World is dying in the snow, and the Junk Robot, created by the girl, regrets having her take the journey. The girl can finally hear the robot and tells it that they once existed in another world. As she hums the tune of "Dango Daikazoku", the illusionary world starts to disappear. As the robot is swept away, the girl calls him "Daddy" and disappears with the world. On the school hill the day Tomoya first met Nagisa, he and the robot become one, he calls after Nagisa, hugs her, and she is glad that he did so. Nagisa brings Tomoya through time, events before Ushio's birth remain the same, and together the voices of Tomoya and the robot note the end of his long journey. Tomoya awakens to Ushio's birth, but this time, Nagisa miraculously survives. After Nagisa watches Tomoya give Ushio her first bath, she and Tomoya see countless orbs of light are floating throughout the city outside the window. They both sing to Ushio and from then on, Tomoya and Nagisa experience a happy life raising their daughter together as a family, finally free of their cursed fate. After five years, Fuko and Kouko are walking to the new hospital to get a checkup. Fuko goes into the woods and spots the girl from the Illusionary World sleeping under a tree. When she approaches, it turns out to be Ushio; Fuko says that she would like to be friends and that the fun is just getting started.
46	23	"The Event from One Year Before"; Transliteration: "Ichinen Mae no Dekigoto" (Japanese: 一年前の出来事)	Mitsuyoshi Yoneda	Fumihiko Shimo	March 19, 2009
One year before the events of the beginning of the story, Tomoya is beginning his second year in high school, while Nagisa is starting her third year. Nagisa is having trouble making friends as usual, while Tomoya and Youhei are busy being delinquents and carrying out pranks on Kyou, and inadvertently Nagisa's, expense. After Nagisa is knocked out by a falling metal pan that Tomoya and Youhei had set up as a prank for freshmen, a classmate of Nagisa's finally finds the chance to talk with her and they become friends. Nagisa keeps the banner from the prank, one with the message to instill confidence written by Tomoya because she feels it attributed her to make a new friend.
47	24	"Under the Green Tree"; Transliteration: "Midori no Ki no Shita de" (Japanese: 緑の樹の下で)	–	–	March 26, 2009
Tomoya tells Ushio of the past events that happened from when he first met Nagisa, until after Ushio is born and Nagisa survives. When Ushio falls asleep during the story, Tomoya begins to quite clearly recall a more tragic set of circumstances, a reality which didn't happen due to efforts of the girl in the illusionary world but of which he has a clear memory of. At the end of this retelling, Tomoya, with Ushio and Fuko who are both asleep, are shown under a tree at the present time having a picnic. Ushio wakes up, just before Nagisa calls the three of them, saying that it is time to head home.
—	OVA	"Another World: Kyou Chapter"; Transliteration: "Mō Hitotsu no Sekai Kyou-hen" (Japanese: もうひとつの世界 杏編)	Noriko Takao	Fumihiko Shimo	July 1, 2009
In an alternate timeline, Ryou confesses her love to Tomoya and they both begin dating. However, Tomoya soon notices that Kyou has been acting strange, and confronts her. Kyou admits that she is also in love with him, but never confessed because she was too scared to risk being rejected or hurting Ryou's feelings. This creates an uneasy love triangle among Tomoya, Kyou, and Ryou, leading Tomoya to finally admit that he loves Kyou. Ryou, already knowing that Tomoya loves Kyou more, encourages Kyou to work up the courage to confess. Ryou breaks up with Tomoya with no hard feelings, wanting to cherish both the good and painful memories they had together. Tomoya and Kyou then officially become a couple.
