= Clannad (film) =

2007 Japanese anime drama film

- Regular edition DVD cover.
- Directed by: Osamu Dezaki
- Written by: Makoto Nakamura; Jun Maeda (visual novel)
- Based on: Clannad by Key
- Produced by: Hiroshi Takahashi; Takeshi Oikawa
- Starring: Kenji Nojima; Mai Nakahara; Ryō Hirohashi; Houko Kuwashima; Daisuke Sakaguchi
- Cinematography: Takeshi Fukuda; Tomokazu Shiratori
- Edited by: Masahiro Goto
- Music by: Yoshichika Inomata
- Animation by: Megumi Kadonosono; Yōichi Ōnishi
- Production companies: Toei Animation; Frontier Works
- Distributed by: Toei Company
- Release date: September 15, 2007
- Running time: 90 minutes
- Country: Japan
- Language: Japanese

Clannad is a 2007 Japanese animated drama film directed by Osamu Dezaki and based on the visual novel Clannad by Key. Toei Animation announced the film's production at the Tokyo Anime Fair on March 23, 2006. It was released theatrically by Toei Company on September 15, 2007. The film is a reinterpretation of the Clannad storyline which centers on the story arc of the female lead Nagisa Furukawa. It was the final film directed by Dezaki before his death in April 2011.

A promotional campaign took to the streets of Akihabara on March 10, 2007, transported in a large black bus with the words "Film Version Clannad" (劇場版CLANNAD, Gekijō-ban Clannad) painted on the sides. A group of young women cosplaying in the female high school uniform from Clannad emerged from the bus to hand out flyers and pink and white colored thundersticks to passersby to promote the film.

== Plot ==
Tomoya Okazaki is a male third-year high school student who does not feel at home anymore. He used to play basketball, his distant father works the night shift, and his mother died in a car accident when he was a child. He simply goes to school in Hikarizara for no reason and has no interest in school activities. One day, Tomoya meets a third-year girl from his school early in the year named Nagisa Furukawa. Repeating her last year due to illness most of the previous year, Nagisa is determined to graduate nonetheless. She comes up with restarting the Drama Club. By the time the sakura trees are done blooming, Nagisa has already started hand-making posters advertising the drama club's reformation, with an old group mascot called "The Big Dango Family". Tomoya and his good friend Youhei Sunohara, who used to play soccer, help Nagisa by putting them up around the school, but the student council president, Tomoyo Sakagami, and Kyou Fujibayashi, quickly go around defacing the posters and writing 'invalid' on them because of school policy. This angers Youhei greatly and he beats up one of the student council members despite Tomoyo and Kyou's warning; Tomoya takes a stand for Nagisa.

Kouko Ibuki, the teacher who had been the adviser for the drama club before it disbanded, gets involved by telling Nagisa if she can gather more members then she will talk to the school administration about re-establishing the club. Tomoya and Youhei try again, this time putting hundreds of copied posters around the school, but no one joins the club. In the end, Nagisa gets Tomoya and Youhei to sign up, and she reassures them that she will not ask them to act on stage. The drama club is re-established, and with a month left until the school festival. Nagisa decides to do a soliloquy based on a dream she has had ever since she was a child. Meanwhile, Tomoya and Youhei will work backstage with the music and lights respectively. Nagisa gets to writing the script and invites Tomoya and Youhei over to her house for dinner. Though only Tomoya comes, due to Youhei taking up a part-time job at an electrical company with Yusuke Yoshino; a former musician revealed to be Kouko's fiancé. At Nagisa's house, Tomoya meets her energetic parents Akio and Sanae. Tomoya is challenged to a baseball match with Akio to see if Tomoya's a man worthy for Nagisa, but he cannot throw the ball due to an injured shoulder he received from his father in a bad fight, and even gets to stay overnight after being heavily persuaded by Akio.

Like Nagisa, Tomoya has also had a recurring dream ever since he was a child. In his dream, he initially is disembodied in an illusionary world where he is the only thing "alive". He finds a discarded human-sized doll and uses it as a body to travel around the world on an old bicycle. After some searching, he finds a large sakura tree known as the "Tree of Promises" where he believes he will meet the person he has felt is with him in this illusionary world.

When the school festival finally begins, Nagisa reveals that she has not finished the script, but still wants to go on with the play since the story is still within her. Nagisa has her performance in the evening, so in the meantime, Nagisa hangs out with Tomoya and Youhei. During lunch, she tells them her story why she wanted to do drama was due to her parents formally having been theater actors, but they both had to give up acting after Nagisa was born. Nagisa wants to do drama so as to continue her parents' dreams in her footsteps. For the play, Sanae gives Nagisa her wedding dress to use as her costume, much to Akio's surprise. Nagisa starts with her monologue without a hitch, and during her recitation, Kouko gives stage directions to Tomoya and Youhei via headsets. Gradually, Tomoya comes to realize that the story Nagisa is reciting is the same dream that he has had, and is shocked to find that Nagisa also had the same dream of the illusionary world. At the play's conclusion, Tomoya believes that he and Nagisa were meant to be together and confesses his love to her.

Shortly after the festival, Nagisa's health falters once again and she has to take another leave of absence from school, meaning it is not until a year after Tomoya's class graduated that Nagisa is able to graduate high school as well. After this, Tomoya and Nagisa start living together in a small apartment in town while Tomoya is recruited full-time at Yusuke's electrical company as well, Nagisa works part-time as a waitress at a local family restaurant, and Youhei becomes a businessman in Tokyo. Eventually, Nagisa becomes pregnant, but her doctor informs her family and Tomoya that if she gives birth to the child, due to having a weak constitution, she may die in the process. After the meeting, they agree on telling Nagisa. Tomoya and Nagisa's parents take her to the beach where she decides the name Ushio for the child. Despite the doctor's warning, she insists that she will be fine. One winter night, Nagisa finally gives birth to a baby girl Ushio and Nagisa dies giving birth. This causes Tomoya to go into a deep depression, during which he does not go to work, or even visit his daughter who is now being raised by Nagisa's parents.

For the past five years, Tomoya's friends try to get him out of his depression, but Tomoya is very stubborn. Then one rainy night, Tomoya's father Naoyuki Okazaki comes over and tells Tomoya that he is putting Ushio in the same relationship he did when his mother died, which greatly stuns him. Later, Naoyuki requested Tomoya's friends: Youhei, Tomoyo, Kyou, Kouko, and her husband Yusuke to take him out on a retreat for a few days in order to break his depression, and they drag Tomoya out of his house so fast he does not even know what is going on. Once they tell him on the train, Tomoya is dead set on going back home but Yusuke convinces him to stay. When they arrive at their destination, Tomoya searches for another platform at the station, anticipating this, Akio and Sanae were waiting for him with Ushio. Just as Tomoya begins to walk away, his friends arrive blocking his way, then Tomoya turns around back at Ushio, she runs towards him holding a stuffed dango. She trips midway which makes Tomoya leap out and catch her. Picking her up with them smiling, he is able to see the continuation of his old dream once more, and sees Nagisa under the Tree of Promises smiling lovingly at him and Ushio.

== Production ==
The film was first announced to be in production at the Tokyo Anime Fair on March 23, 2006, for a planned 2007 release by Toei Animation. The original character design was conceived by Itaru Hinoue, the art director from Key who worked on the visual novel. This design was later used as a template for Megumi Kadonosono who provided the character art for the film adaptation. Kadonosono previously worked on two other animated films released in early 2007: Fashionable Witches Love and Berry: Magic of Happiness as the chief animation director, and the Kiddy Grade film, also providing the character design. The screenplay was written by Makoto Nakamura who had worked on the first Kanon anime television series in 2002, and the Air film in 2005, two other anime adapted from visual novels originally made by Key. Finally, the film was directed by Osamu Dezaki, who has been involved with animation direction since the first Astro Boy anime in 1963, and had previously directed the Air film.

== Media releases ==
=== DVDs ===
A set of three DVDs packaged together contained preview footage and promotional material that was released on April 28, 2007, which came bundled with a promotional poster. The main feature was a nearly nine-minute teaser for the film which provided a general overview of the important characters and revealed some of the plot. Another video is a short one-minute-fifteen-second piece compiling scenes from the film that come together as a backdrop to the original version of the song "Mag Mell" taken from the visual novel's original soundtrack. The last two videos included are short television commercials, one thirty seconds in length, and the second fifteen seconds. The DVD set was only available to those who pre-ordered film tickets. The film was released on DVD in three editions: the Collector's Edition, the Special Edition, and the Regular Edition on March 7, 2008. The Collector's Edition is sold in a specialized box including, with a special illustrated jacket, a picture label, and a deluxe booklet. The Special Edition was similarly released in a box set containing the film DVD, along with the special illustrated jacket and the picture label, but also contained a bonus drama CD, and a bonus DVD. The Regular Edition contained no special features and was sold in a normal DVD case containing only the film DVD. Anime licensor Sentai Filmworks licensed the film and released the film in both English-subtitled and dubbed format in March 2011.

=== Music ===
A maxi single entitled "Mag Mell (frequency⇒e Ver.)" (メグメル ～frequency⇒e Ver.～, Megumeru ~frequency⇒e Ver.~) was released on July 14, 2007, by Frontier Works containing the two theme songs to the film arranged by Eufonius. The first track is an arranged version of "Mag Mell", the opening theme to the original visual novel, sung by Riya. The second track is an original song, again sung by Riya. The final track is an off vocal version of the first track. The music CD was only available to those who pre-ordered film tickets. An image song single by Lia named "Yakusoku" was released at Comiket 72 on August 17, 2007, but was only given to those who bought film tickets in advance. The film's original soundtrack was released on November 21, 2007, by Frontier Works.
