= Juri Misaki =

Japanese manga artist (born 1980)

Juri Misaki (みさき樹里, Misaki Juri; born September 25, 1980) is a Japanese manga artist, notable for illustrating the Clannad manga. She is also known by the nickname Misaki-chi (みさきち).
