= Music of Clannad =

Music from the visual novel Clannad

Clannad discography
- Studio albums: 2
- Soundtrack albums: 2
- Singles: 4
- Remixes: 4

Clannad is a visual novel developed by Key and published by VisualArt's in 2004. The story follows Tomoya Okazaki, a discontented high school student whose life changes when he meets a girl one year older than him named Nagisa Furukawa. It was adapted by Toei Animation into an animated film in 2007 directed by Osamu Dezaki with music direction by Yoshichika Inomata. Kyoto Animation also adapted it into two anime television series consisting of 49 episodes broadcast between 2007 and 2009, including two original video animation episodes released in 2008 and 2009, directed by Tatsuya Ishihara with music direction by Shinji Orito. The discography of Clannad and its anime adaptations consists of two studio albums, four singles, two soundtracks, and four remix albums.

The core of the discography is the two original soundtrack albums. The visual novel's soundtrack, which was also used for both anime series, was produced by Key Sounds Label and released in 2004. The music on the soundtrack was composed and arranged by Jun Maeda, Shinji Orito and Magome Togoshi. A soundtrack for the animated film was released in 2007 by Frontier Works. The music on the film soundtrack was mainly composed and arranged by Yoshichika Inomata. Two studio image song albums were released for the visual novel in 2003 and 2004. Three remix albums were released for the visual novel in 2004 and 2005, and a remix album was released for the second anime series in 2008. Four singles were released in 2007 and 2008, two for the film and one each for both anime series.

== Albums ==
=== Sorarado ===
Sorarado (ソララド) is an image album for the Clannad visual novel, and was first released on December 28, 2003 in Japan by Key Sounds Label bearing the catalog number KSLA-0009. The album contains one disc with six tracks sung by Riya that sample tunes from background music featured in the Clannad Original Soundtrack. The album is composed, arranged, and produced by Shinji Orito, Magome Togoshi, Riya, Manyo, and Takumaru.

Track listing
No.	Title	Lyrics	Music	Arrangement	Length
1.	"Shōjo no Gensō" (少女の幻想 The Girl's Fantasy)	Key	Magome Togoshi	Takumaru	5:43
2.	"Over" (オーバー Ōbā)	Key	Shinji Orito	Manyo	5:07
3.	"Uminari" (海鳴り Roaring Ocean)	Key	Shinji Orito	Manyo	5:51
4.	"Tōi Tabi no Kioku" (遠い旅の記憶 Memories of a Distant Journey)	Riya	Shinji Orito	Takumaru	5:38
5.	"Ichiman no Kiseki" (一万の軌跡 Ten Thousand Places)	Key	Shinji Orito, Magome Togoshi	Manyo	6:53
6.	"Sora ni Hikaru" (空に光る Shining in the Sky)	Key	Magome Togoshi	Takumaru	5:11
Total length:					34:23

=== Mabinogi ===
Mabinogi is an arrange album which contains a selection of songs from the visual novel Clannad, remixed by Hideki Higuchi. This album was released as a bonus item, included with the limited edition first printing of the PC version of the game released on April 28, 2004 by Key Sounds Label bearing the catalog number KSLA-0010, though this was later corrected to KSLA-0011. This album was not released for individual sale. Of the nine tracks on the one-disc album, only the first eight were arranged versions of background music found in the game. In 2014, it was re-released through Sekai Project's Kickstarter for the official English translation of the game. It was available as part of the Clannad Kickstarter Limited Box, a digital only addition to some tiers, and as a separate digital only Kickstarter add-on.

Track listing
No.	Title	Music	Length
1.	"Sono Sakura Sudare o Nukete" (その桜簾を抜けて Raise Those Cherry-blossom Blinds)	Jun Maeda	3:31
2.	"Moegiiro no Ishidatami o Kakeru" (萌葱色の石畳を駆ける Run Along the Chartreuse Pavement)	Magome Togoshi	6:08
3.	"Kaze ni Nabiku Himawariiro no One-piece" (風になびく向日葵色のワンピース Sunflower-colored Dress Fluttering in the Wind)	Magome Togoshi	3:25
4.	"Munamoto ni Rairakku no Hana Kazari" (胸元にライラックの花飾り Lilac Flower Ornament on the Breast)	Shinji Orito	1:57
5.	"Tenohira ni Nokoru Nukumori wa" (手のひらに残る温もりは The Warmth Left in the Palm of Your Hand)	Shinji Orito	4:42
6.	"Umarekawatta Atarashii Seimei" (生まれ変わった新しい生命 A New Life Reborn)	Jun Maeda	6:28
7.	"Hikari Afureru Yurikago no Naka de" (光りあふれる揺りかごの中で Inside a Cradle Overflowing with Light)	Shinji Orito	6:03
8.	"Haha Kara Ko e Uketsugareru Chiisana Uta" (母から子へ受け継がれる小さな唄 A Small Song Passed from Mother to Child)	Jun Maeda	7:29
9.	"Mag Mell (long ver.)" (メグメル Megu Meru) (Lyrics by Riya; Arrangement by Kiku; Performed by Riya)	Eufonius	4:51
Total length:			44:34

=== Clannad Original Soundtrack ===
The Clannad Original Soundtrack, from the visual novel Clannad, was first released on August 13, 2004 in Japan by Key Sounds Label bearing the catalog numbers KSLA-0012—0014. The soundtrack contains three discs totaling fifty-six songs composed, arranged, and produced by Jun Maeda, Shinji Orito, and Magome Togoshi. Tracks nine through nineteen on disc three are considered to be bonus tracks. Riya provides vocals for three songs, "Mag Mell", "-Kage Futatsu-", and "Chiisana Tenohira"; Lia provides vocals for the song "Ana".

Disc 1
No.	Title	Music	Length
1.	"Ushio" (汐)	Magome Togoshi	1:08
2.	"Gensō" (幻想 Fantasy)	Magome Togoshi	3:22
3.	"Mag Mell" (メグメル Megu Meru) (Lyrics by Riya; Arrangement by Kiku; Performed by Eufonius)	Eufonius	4:52
4.	"Machi, Toki no Nagare, Hito" (町、時の流れ、人 Town, Flow of Time, People)	Shinji Orito	4:28
5.	"Nagisa" (渚)	Jun Maeda	4:10
6.	"Sore wa Kaze no Yōni" (それは風のように That's Like the Wind)	Shinji Orito	4:02
7.	"Étude Pour les Petites Supercordes"	Magome Togoshi	4:50
8.	"Hurry, Starfish" (は～りぃすたーふぃしゅ Hārī Sutāfisshu)	Magome Togoshi	4:18
9.	"Kanojo no Honki" (彼女の本気 Her Determination)	Magome Togoshi	4:06
10.	"Shiryōshitsu no Ochakai" (資料室のお茶会 Tea Party in the Reference Room)	Shinji Orito	3:58
11.	"Kochi" (東風 Spring Breeze)	Shinji Orito	3:32
12.	"Inaka Komichi" (田舎小径 Country Lane)	Magome Togoshi	3:16
13.	"Yūigi na Jikan no Sugoshikata" (有意義な時間の過ごし方 Meaningful Ways to Pass the Time)	Magome Togoshi	3:20
14.	"Hibi no Itoma" (日々の遑 The Days' Leisure)	Shinji Orito	1:51
15.	"Dumb" (ダム Damu)	Shinji Orito	4:56
16.	"Baka Futari" (馬鹿ふたり A Pair of Idiots)	Shinji Orito	2:28
17.	"Kaijin ni Kaesu" (灰燼に帰す Reduce to Ashes)	Shinji Orito	3:40
18.	"Sonzai" (存在 Existence)	Magome Togoshi	2:25
19.	"Tsuki no Isō" (月の位相 Phase of the Moon)	Shinji Orito	3:52
20.	"Muken" (無間 Incessant)	Shinji Orito	3:52

Disc 2
No.	Title	Music	Length
1.	"Yuki Nohara" (雪野原 Snowfield)	Shinji Orito	5:11
2.	"Shionari" (潮鳴り Roaring Tide)	Shinji Orito	2:37
3.	"Shionari II" (潮鳴り Roaring Tide)	Shinji Orito	4:15
4.	"TOE"	Magome Togoshi	2:44
5.	"Onaji Takami e" (同じ高みへ To the Same Heights)	Jun Maeda	1:59
6.	"Negai ga Kanau Basho" (願いが叶う場所 The Place Where Wishes Come True)	Jun Maeda	2:49
7.	"Sora ni Hikaru" (空に光る Shining in the Sky)	Magome Togoshi	5:08
8.	"-Kage Futatsu-" (－影二つ－ -Two Shadows-) (Lyrics by Kai; Arrangement by Magome Togoshi; Performed by Riya)	Magome Togoshi	5:37
9.	"Shirotsumekusa" (白詰草 White Clovers)	Shinji Orito	3:44
10.	"Haruka na Nengetsu (piano)" (遥かな年月 Distant Years)	Jun Maeda	1:56
11.	"Natsu Jikan" (夏時間 Summertime)	Magome Togoshi	2:44
12.	"Haruka na Nengetsu" (遥かな年月 Distant Years)	Jun Maeda	4:34
13.	"Country Train" (カントリートレイン Kantorī Torein)	Jun Maeda	3:54
14.	"Negai ga Kanau Basho II" (願いが叶う場所 The Place Where Wishes Come True)	Jun Maeda	4:08
15.	"Ana" (Lyrics by Yū Hagiwara; Arrangement by Magome Togoshi; Performed by Lia)	Traditional	5:46
16.	"Nagisa (Saka no Shita no Wakare)" (渚～坂の下の別れ Nagisa (Parting at the Foot of the Hill))	Jun Maeda	3:54
17.	"Chiisana Tenohira" (小さなてのひら Small Palms) (Lyrics by Jun Maeda; Arrangement by Magome Togoshi; Performed by Riya)	Jun Maeda	4:44

Disc 3
No.	Title	Music	Length
1.	"Gensō II" (幻想 Fantasy)	Magome Togoshi	1:54
2.	"Kochi (afternoon)" (東風 Spring Breeze)	Shinji Orito	3:33
3.	"Kochi (tempo up)" (東風 Spring Breeze)	Shinji Orito	3:04
4.	"Kochi (piano)" (東風 Spring Breeze)	Shinji Orito	1:45
5.	"Yūigi na Jikan no Sugoshikata (guitar)" (有意義な時間の過ごし方 Meaningful Ways to Pass the Time)	Magome Togoshi	3:21
6.	"Yūigi na Jikan no Sugoshikata (sax)" (有意義な時間の過ごし方 Meaningful Ways to Pass the Time)	Magome Togoshi	3:22
7.	"Sonzai (e.piano)" (存在 Existence)	Magome Togoshi	2:24
8.	"Sonzai (piano)" (存在 Existence)	Magome Togoshi	2:27
9.	"Mag Mell (cockool mix full ver.)" (メグメル Megu Meru) (Lyrics by Riya; Arrangement by Eufonius; Performed by Eufonius)	Eufonius	4:27
10.	"Mag Mell (short ver.)" (メグメル Megu Meru) (Lyrics by Riya; Arrangement by Kiku; Performed by Eufonius)	Eufonius	2:40
11.	"Mag Mell (cockool mix short ver.)" (メグメル Megu Meru) (Lyrics by Riya; Arrangement by Eufonius; Performed by Eufonius)	Eufonius	2:39
12.	"-Kage Futatsu- (short ver.)" (－影二つ－ -Two Shadows-) (Lyrics by Kai; Arrangement by Magome Togoshi; Performed by Riya)	Magome Togoshi	2:34
13.	"Ana (short ver.)" (Lyrics by Yū Hagiwara; Arrangement by Magome Togoshi; Performed by Lia)	Traditional	5:25
14.	"Ana (full ver.)" (Lyrics by Yū Hagiwara; Arrangement by Magome Togoshi; Performed by Lia)	Traditional	8:24
15.	"Mag Mell (off vocal ver.)" (メグメル Megu Meru) (Arrangement by Kiku)	Eufonius	4:51
16.	"Chiisana Tenohira (off vocal ver.)" (小さなてのひら Small Palms) (Arrangement by Magome Togoshi)	Jun Maeda	4:40
17.	"-Kage Futatsu- (off vocal ver.)" (－影二つ－ -Two Shadows-) (Arrangement by Magome Togoshi)	Magome Togoshi	5:36
18.	"Mishiyō Kyoku 1" (未使用曲 Unused Track)	Shinji Orito	3:31
19.	"Mishiyō Kyoku 2" (未使用曲 Unused Track)	Magome Togoshi	2:21
Total length:			207:08

=== Sorarado Append ===
Sorarado Append (ソララドアペンド, Sorarado Apendo) is an image album for the Clannad visual novel, and was first released on December 28, 2004 in Japan by Key Sounds Label bearing the catalog number KSLA-0015. The album is a follow-up to the earlier released Sorarado, and contains one disc with four tracks sung by Riya that sample tunes from background music featured in the Clannad Original Soundtrack. The album is composed, arranged, and produced by Jun Maeda, Magome Togoshi, Manyo, and Takumaru.

All lyrics are written by Key.

Track listing
No.	Title	Music	Arrangement	Length
1.	"Onaji Takami" (同じ高み Same Height)	Jun Maeda	Manyo	4:53
2.	"Kaze no Shōjo" (風の少女 Maiden of the Wind)	Magome Togoshi	Manyo	3:50
3.	"Hitohira no Sakura" (ひとひらの桜 Cherry Blossom Petal)	Jun Maeda	Takumaru	6:30
4.	"Komorebi" (木漏れ日 Sunbeams Streaming Through the Leaves)	Magome Togoshi	Takumaru	4:00
Total length:				19:13

=== -Memento- ===
-Memento- is a remix album for the Clannad visual novel, and was first released on December 28, 2004 in Japan by Key Sounds Label bearing the catalog numbers KSLA-0016—0017. The album contains two discs with seventeen tracks remixed from background music featured on the Clannad Original Soundtrack. Riya provides vocals for four songs, "Mag Mell", "-Kage Futatsu-", "Chiisana Tenohira", and "Sakura Jokyoku"; Lia provides vocals for the song "Ana". Each track is arranged by a different person, three of which include Shinji Orito, Magome Togoshi, and OdiakeS.

Disc 1
No.	Title	Music	Arrangement	Length
1.	"Mag Mell" (メグメル Megu Meru) (Lyrics by Riya; Performed by Eufonius)	Eufonius	Shinji Hosoe	6:10
2.	"Hurry Starfish (PaPiPuPe Mix)" (は～りぃすたーふぃっしゅ Hārī Sutāfisshu)	Magome Togoshi	Manack	5:15
3.	"Onaji Takami e" (同じ高みへ To the Same Heights)	Jun Maeda	Shinji Orito	5:41
4.	"Baka Futari" (馬鹿ふたり A Pair of Idiots)	Shinji Orito	Magome Togoshi	5:29
5.	"Tsuki no Isō" (月の位相 Phase of the Moon)	Shinji Orito	Jun.A	4:25
6.	"Yuki Nohara" (雪野原 Snowfield)	Shinji Orito	ZTS	9:08
7.	"-Kage Futatsu- (MintJam Mix)" (－影二つ－ -Two Shadows-) (Lyrics by Kai; Performed by Riya)	Magome Togoshi	MintJam	5:20
8.	"Ana" (Lyrics by Yū Hagiwara; Performed by Lia)	Traditional	Soshi Hosoi	6:21
9.	"Nagisa (Saka no Shita no Wakare Piano Arrange)" (渚～坂の下の別れ Nagisa: Parting at the Foot of the Hill Warm)	Jun Maeda	Tabibito	4:14
10.	"Chiisana Tenohira (new seasons mix)" (小さなてのひら Small Palms) (Lyrics by Jun Maeda; Performed by Riya)	Jun Maeda	bermei.inazawa	4:27

Disc 2
No.	Title	Music	Arrangement	Length
1.	"Ushio" (汐)	Magome Togoshi	Lians	4:24
2.	"Sore wa Kaze no Yōni" (それは風のように That's Like the Wind)	Shinji Orito	Toshihiko Inoue	4:21
3.	"Yūigi na Jikan no Sugoshikata" (有意義な時間の過ごし方 Meaningful Ways to Pass the Time)	Magome Togoshi	Kotono	3:19
4.	"Shiryōshitsu no Ochakai (GMBP2004 Mix)" (資料室のお茶会 Tea Party in the Reference Room)	Shinji Orito	GMBP	4:24
5.	"Kaijin ni Kaesu" (灰燼に帰す Reduce to Ashes)	Shinji Orito	Kazuhiko Shimochi	5:28
6.	"Sora ni Hikaru" (空に光る Shining in the Sky)	Magome Togoshi	OdiakeS	4:13
7.	"Sakura Jokyoku" (桜抒曲 Song of the Cherry Blossoms) (Performed by Riya)	Jun Maeda		10:20
Total length:				92:59

=== Piano no Mori ===
Piano no Mori (ピアノの森) is a piano arrange album with songs taken from the Clannad and Tomoyo After: It's a Wonderful Life visual novels and arranged into piano versions. It was first released on December 29, 2005 in Japan by Key Sounds Label bearing the catalog number KSLA-0021. The album contains one disc with ten tracks; the first five songs are from Clannad while the last five are from Tomoyo After. The album is composed, and produced by Jun Maeda, Shinji Orito, Magome Togoshi, and Eufonius; all the tracks are arranged by Ryō Mizutsuki.

Track listing
No.	Title	Music	Length
1.	"Onaji Takami e" (同じ高みへ To the Same Heights)	Jun Maeda	3:54
2.	"Mag Mell" (メグメル Megumeru)	Eufonius	4:53
3.	"Shirotsumekusa" (白詰草 White Clovers)	Magome Togoshi	5:07
4.	"Chiisana Tenohira" (小さなてのひら Small Palms)	Jun Maeda	4:41
5.	"-Kage Futatsu-" (-影二つ- -Two Shadows-)	Magome Togoshi	5:12
6.	"Dear Old Home"	Shinji Orito	4:44
7.	"Rivulet"	Shinji Orito	5:38
8.	"Worth Living"	Shinji Orito (originally by Magome Togoshi)	6:14
9.	"Harmony With Sorrow"	Jun Maeda (originally by Shinji Orito)	7:30
10.	"Love Song"	Magome Togoshi (originally by Jun Maeda)	6:51
Total length:			54:44

=== Clannad Film Soundtrack ===
The Clannad Film Soundtrack (劇場版「CLANNAD-クラナド-」 SOUNDTRACK, Gekijōban Clannad Soundtrack) is the soundtrack to the Clannad film released by Frontier Works on November 21, 2007 bearing the catalog number FCCM-0198. The album spans one disc with twenty-seven tracks featuring music composed by Yoshichika Inomata. Four songs are performed by Eufonius and sung by Riya, "Mag Mell (frequency⇒e Ver.)", "Marmelo (fildychrom)", "Marmelo (fildychrom La la la Ver.)", and "Chiisana Tenohira (Eufonius Ver.)"; the last song on the soundtrack, "Yakusoku", is sung by Lia.

All tracks are written by Yoshichika Inomata, except where noted.

Track listing
No.	Title	Length
1.	"Dango Dango Dango" (だんご だんご だんご)	1:53
2.	"Tomoya no Yume" (朋也の夢 Tomoya's Dream)	0:59
3.	"Genki ni Natta Nagisa" (元気になった渚 Cheered-up Nagisa)	1:03
4.	"Pan Kai Kyōsō" (パン買い競争 Bread Buying Competition)	0:39
5.	"Yūjō" (友情 Friendship)	0:43
6.	"Nagisa" (渚)	1:54
7.	"Kibō ni Moete" (希望に燃えて Burning with Wishes)	0:46
8.	"Nakayoshi Kazoku" (仲良し家族 Intimate Family)	0:43
9.	"Yume no Hanashi" (夢の話 A Talk about Dreams)	2:04
10.	"Kinenshashin" (記念写真 Souvenir Photograph)	0:25
11.	"Umibe nite" (海辺にて At the Beach)	1:05
12.	"Jiken" (事件 Incident)	0:42
13.	"Nanika ga Kawaru..." (なにかが変わる Something Changes)	1:34
14.	"Marching Band" (マーチングバンド Māchingu Bando)	1:33
15.	"Tanoshii Sōritsusai" (楽しい創立祭 A Fun Founder's Festival)	1:50
16.	"Nagisa Netsuen!" (渚熱演! Nagisa's Enthusiastic Performance!)	2:33
17.	"Odoru Nagisa" (踊る渚 Dancing Nagisa)	0:48
18.	"Omae ga Suki" (お前が好き I Love You)	1:26
19.	"Nagisa no Shi" (渚の死 Nagisa's Death)	1:59
20.	"Chichi no Kotoba" (父の言葉 Father's Words)	1:09
21.	"Yoshino Band" (芳野バンド Yoshino Bando)	1:04
22.	"Ushio to Saikai" (汐と再会 Reunion with Ushio)	1:39
23.	"Mag Mell (frequency⇒e Ver.)" (メグメル Megu Meru) (Lyrics by Riya; Composed by Eufonius; Arrangement by Eufonius; Performed by Eufonius)	4:56
24.	"Marmelo (fildychrom)" (マルメロ Marumero) (Lyrics by Riya; Composed by Eufonius; Arrangement by Eufonius; Performed by Eufonius)	3:48
25.	"Marmelo" (fildychrom La la la Ver.)" (マルメロ Marumero) (Lyrics by Riya; Composed by Eufonius; Arrangement by Eufonius; Performed by Eufonius)	3:48
26.	"Chiisana Tenohira (Eufonius Ver.)" (小さな手のひら Small Palms) (Lyrics by Jun Maeda; Composed by Jun Maeda; Arrangement by Eufonius; Performed by Eufonius)	4:27
27.	"Yakusoku" (約束 Promise) (Performed by Lia)	4:31
Total length:		50:01

=== "Toki o Kizamu Uta / Torch" Piano Arrange Disc ===
"Toki o Kizamu Uta / Torch" Piano Arrange Disc is a piano arrange album for the Clannad After Story anime series by Kyoto Animation which was released on December 28, 2008 at Comiket 75 in Japan by Key Sounds Label bearing the catalog number KSLC-0003. The album contains one disc with two tracks, which are piano arrange versions of the opening and ending themes from the anime version. The album is composed, arranged, and produced by Jun Maeda, Shinji Orito, and Ryō Mizutsuki. The album came bundled with the "Toki o Kizamu Uta / Torch" piano sheet music book.

Track listing
No.	Title	Music	Arrangement	Length
1.	"Toki o Kizamu Uta" (時を刻む唄 A Song to Pass the Time)	Jun Maeda	Ryō Mizutsuki	6:14
2.	"Torch"	Shinji Orito	Ryō Mizutsuki	4:38
Total length:				10:52

== Singles ==
=== Mag Mell ===
"Mag Mell (frequency⇒e Ver.)" (メグメル ～frequency⇒e Ver.～, Megu Meru ~frequency⇒e Ver.~) is a maxi single arranged by the J-pop band Eufonius first released in Japan on July 14, 2007 by Frontier Works. The music CD was only available to those who have already pre-ordered film tickets. The CD contains three tracks, two theme songs sung by Riya for the Clannad film, and an instrumental version of track one.

All lyrics are written by Riya; all music is composed by Eufonius.

Track listing
No.	Title	Length
1.	"Mag Mell (frequency⇒e Ver.)" (メグメル ～frequency⇒e Ver.～ Megu Meru ~frequency⇒e Ver.~)	4:55
2.	"Marmelo (fildychrom short ver.)" (マルメロ short ver. Marumero short ver.)	1:34
3.	"Mag Mell (frequency⇒e Ver. off vocal)" (メグメル ～frequency⇒e Ver.～ off voal Megu Meru ~frequency⇒e Ver.~ off vocal)	4:55
Total length:		11:24

=== Yakusoku ===
"Yakusoku" (約束; Promise) is an image song single for the Clannad film by Lia originally released at Comiket 72 on August 17, 2007, produced by Frontier Works. The music CD was only available to those who bought film tickets early for the Clannad film. The single contains four tracks, with only the first song "Yakusoku" sung by Lia while tracks two and three are background music from the Clannad Film Soundtrack, and the final track is an instrumental version of "Promise".

Track listing
No.	Title	Length
1.	"Yakusoku" (約束 Promise)	4:32
2.	"Nagisa no Theme (Gekijōban BGM yori)" (渚のテーマ（劇場版ＢＧＭより） Nagisa's Theme (From the film version BGM))	0:49
3.	"Nagisa (Gekijōban BGM yori)" (渚（劇場版ＢＧＭより） Nagisa (From the film version BGM))	1:54
4.	"Yakusoku (off vocal)" (約束 Promise)	4:31
Total length:		11:46

=== Mag Mell / Dango Daikazoku ===
"Mag Mell (cuckool mix 2007) / Dango Daikazoku" (メグメル 〜cuckool mix 2007〜／だんご大家族, Megu Meru ~cuckool mix 2007~ / Dango Daikazoku) is a single for the Clannad anime series by Kyoto Animation which was released on October 26, 2007 in Japan by Key Sounds Label bearing the catalog number KSLA-0036. The single contains the opening and ending themes from the anime version in full length, TV length, and off-vocal versions, along with a bonus remix track of the song "Shōjo no Gensō" from the earlier Sorarado image album released in 2003. The opening theme "Mag Mell (cuckool mix 2007)" is performed by Eufonius and sung by Riya, who also sings "Shōjo no Gensō". The ending theme "Dango Daikazoku" is sung by Chata. The single is composed, arranged, and produced by Jun Maeda, Magome Togoshi, Hajime Kikuchi, Takumaru, and ZTS.

Track listing
No.	Title	Music	Arrangement	Length
1.	"Mag Mell (cuckool mix 2007)" (メグメル 〜cuckool mix 2007〜 Megu Meru ~cuckool mix 2007~) (Lyrics by Riya; Performed by Eufonius)	Eufonius	Hajime Kikuchi	4:41
2.	"Dango Daikazoku" (だんご大家族 The Big Dango Family) (Lyrics by Jun Maeda; Performed by Chata)	Jun Maeda	Takumaru	4:32
3.	"Mag Mell (cuckool mix 2007 TV animation Ver.)" (メグメル Megu Meru) (Lyrics by Riya; Performed by Eufonius)	Eufonius	Hajime Kikuchi	1:31
4.	"Dango Daikazoku (TV animation Ver.)" (だんご大家族 The Big Dango Family) (Lyrics by Jun Maeda; Performed by Chata)	Jun Maeda	Takumaru	1:28
5.	"Mag Mell (cuckool mix 2007 off vocal ver.)" (メグメル 〜cuckool mix 2007〜 off vocal ver. Megu Meru ~cuckool mix 2007~ off vocal ver.)	Eufonius	Hajime Kikuchi	4:41
6.	"Dango Daikazoku (off vocal ver.)" (だんご大家族 The Big Dango Family)	Jun Maeda	Takumaru	4:32
7.	"Shōjo no Gensō (ZTS Remix)" (少女の幻想 The Girl's Fantasy) (Lyrics by Key; Performed by Riya)	Magome Togoshi	ZTS	10:55
Total length:				32:20

=== Toki o Kizamu Uta / Torch ===
"Toki o Kizamu Uta (時を刻む唄) / Torch" is a single for the Clannad After Story anime series by Kyoto Animation which was released on November 14, 2008 in Japan by Key Sounds Label bearing the catalog number KSLA-0044. The single contains the opening and ending themes from the anime version in full length, TV length, and off-vocal versions; the vocal songs are sung by Lia. The single is composed, arranged, and produced by Jun Maeda, Shinji Orito, Kai, Anant-Garde Eyes, and Kentarō Fukushi. The single achieved a daily ranking of No. 3 the day of its release on Japan's Oricon charts for singles, and ranked in at No. 13 in the weekly singles charts for the week of November 16, 2008. The single dropped to No. 19 on the weekly singles charts for the week of November 23, 2008. By November 26, 2008, the single had sold 15,765 units. The total reported sales of the single reached 21,706 units.

Track listing
No.	Title	Music	Arrangement	Length
1.	"Toki o Kizamu Uta" (時を刻む唄 A Song to Pass the Time) (Lyrics by Jun Maeda)	Jun Maeda	Anant-Garde Eyes	4:51
2.	"Torch" (Lyrics by Kai)	Shinji Orito	Kentarō Fukushi	5:05
3.	"Toki o Kizamu Uta (TV animation Ver.)" (時を刻む唄 A Song to Pass the Time) (Lyrics by Jun Maeda)	Jun Maeda	Anant-Garde Eyes	1:31
4.	"Torch (TV animation Ver.)" (Lyrics by Kai)	Shinji Orito	Kentarō Fukushi	1:31
5.	"Toki o Kizamu Uta (off vocal ver.)" (時を刻む唄 A Song to Pass the Time)	Jun Maeda	Anant-Garde Eyes	4:51
6.	"Torch (off vocal ver.)"	Shinji Orito	Kentarō Fukushi	5:05
Total length:				22:54

== Charts ==
Albums	Release date	Label	Format	Peak Oricon chart positions
Clannad Original Soundtrack	August 13, 2004	Key Sounds Label (KSLA-0012—0014)	CD	101
"Mag Mell / Dango Daikazoku"	October 26, 2007	Key Sounds Label (KSLA-0036)	CD	18
Clannad Film Soundtrack	November 21, 2007	Frontier Works (FCCM-0198)	CD	197
"Toki o Kizamu Uta / Torch"	November 14, 2008	Key Sounds Label (KSLA-0044)	CD	13
