= Takeshi Fukuda =

Japanese anime director of photography

- Occupation: Director of photography

Takeshi Fukuda (福田 岳志, Fukuda Takeshi) is a director of photography for many anime television and movie productions. There are small groups of fans of his many projects.

== Projects ==
All credits are for director of photography unless otherwise noted.

- Air (TV series)
- Air (film)
- Dr. Slump (TV and movie series)
- Goldfish Warning! (movie)
- GoShogun
- Idol Densetsu Eriko
- Idol Angel Yokoso Yoko
- Legend of Heavenly Sphere Shurato
- Magical Princess Minky Momo
- Magical Taruruto-kun (TV and movie series)
- NG Knight Lamune & 40
- Rokudenashi Blues (movie series)
- Make-Up! Sailor Senshi (special shown before the Sailor Moon R movie)
- Saint Seiya Heaven Chapter ~ Overture (digital photography director)
- Sei Jūshi Bismarck
- Slam Dunk (TV and movie series)
- Tokusō Kihei Dorvack
- Yawara! A Fashionable Judo Girl (movie)
