= Clannad (video game) =

2004 Japanese video game

- Cover featuring heroine Nagisa Furukawa
- Developer: Key
- Publishers: Visual Arts (Windows, Android); Interchannel (PS2); Prototype (FOMA, S3G, PSP, XB360, PS3, PSV, PS4, Switch); WW: Sekai Project (Windows)
- Director: Jun Maeda
- Artist: Itaru Hinoue
- Writers: Jun Maeda; Yūichi Suzumoto; Kai; Tōya Okano
- Composers: Jun Maeda; Shinji Orito; Magome Togoshi
- Platforms: Microsoft Windows, PlayStation 2, Freedom of Mobile Multimedia Access, SoftBank 3G, PlayStation Portable, Xbox 360, PlayStation 3, Android, PlayStation Vita, PlayStation 4, Nintendo Switch
- Release: Clannad April 28, 2004: Windows; JP: April 28, 2004; JP: February 29, 2008; JP: May 28, 2010; WW: November 23, 2015 PlayStation 2; JP: February 23, 2006 FOMA; JP: November 26, 2007 SoftBank 3G; JP: January 16, 2008 PlayStation Portable; JP: May 29, 2008 Xbox 360; JP: August 28, 2008 PlayStation 3; JP: April 21, 2011 Android; JP: September 18, 2012 PlayStation Vita; JP: August 14, 2014 PlayStation 4; WW: June 14, 2018 Nintendo Switch; WW: July 4, 2019; Clannad Side Stories January 2008: FOMA, Softbank 3G; JP: January 2008 Xbox 360; JP: August 28, 2008 (Note: Released as downloadable content via Xbox Live.) PlayStation Portable; JP: June 3, 2010 (vol. 1); JP: July 15, 2010 (vol. 2) PlayStation 3; JP: July 6, 2011 (Note: Released as downloadable content on the PlayStation Store.) Android; JP: November 30, 2011 (vol. 1); JP: April 11, 2012 (vol. 2) Windows; WW: June 2, 2016 Nintendo Switch; WW: May 20, 2021
- Genre: Visual novel
- Mode: Single-player

Clannad (stylized "CLANNAD") is a Japanese visual novel developed by Key and released on April 28, 2004, for Windows. While both of Key's first two previous works, Kanon and Air, had been released first as adult games and then censored for the younger market, Clannad was specifically made for all ages. It was later ported to the PlayStation 2, PlayStation Portable, Xbox 360, PlayStation 3, PlayStation Vita, PlayStation 4 and Nintendo Switch consoles. An English version for Windows was released on Steam by Sekai Project in 2015.

The story follows the life of Tomoya Okazaki, from adolescence to adulthood. As an average high school student, he meets many people in his last year at school, including five girls, whose individual problems he helps resolve, and his life is further detailed after graduating from high school. The gameplay of Clannad follows a plot that branches into different scenarios based on various courses of interaction by the player character. The game was ranked as the best-selling PC game sold in Japan for the time of its release, and charted in the national top 50 several more times afterwards. Key went on to produce an adult spin-off titled Tomoyo After: It's a Wonderful Life in November 2005, which expanded on the scenario of Tomoyo Sakagami, one of the five heroines from Clannad.

Clannad has made several transitions to other media. There have been four manga adaptations published by ASCII Media Works, Flex Comix, Fujimi Shobo and Jive. Comic anthologies, light novels and art books have also been published, as have audio dramas and several albums of music. An animated film adaptation by Toei Animation was released in September 2007, followed by two anime television series including two original video animation (OVA) episodes by Kyoto Animation produced between 2007 and 2009. Both anime series and their accompanying OVAs are licensed by Sentai Filmworks and were released in North America in 2009. The animated adaptations have received high sales figures in Japan as well as critical acclaim abroad.

== Gameplay ==
Text in Clannad is displayed in a dialog box, here depicting the player character talking to Nagisa.

Clannad is a drama and romance visual novel in which the player assumes the role of Tomoya Okazaki. Much of its gameplay is spent on reading the story's narrative and dialogue. Clannad follows a branching plot line with multiple paths and endings. There are six main plotlines that the player can experience, five which are initially available. At various points during gameplay, the player is given a dialog choice that can influence the progression of the story.

When first playing the game, the scenarios for all five heroines and additional smaller scenarios are available in what is called the School Life story arc. When the player completes a character's scenario, he or she receives an orb of light. When eight of these lights are obtained, the game's second story arc, called After Story, is made available. One of the lights disappears during School Life, but reappears in After Story. To view the true ending of Clannad, all 13 lights must be obtained. Originally, the lights were meant to be items that players could use in the game, but since this increased the game's complexity, and detracted from the storyline, the function of the lights was simplified and made less intrusive.

== Premise ==
=== Setting and themes ===
Clannad takes place primarily at the fictional Hikarizaka Private High School in Japan. Outside the school, the most common locations include the bakery run by Nagisa's parents and dormitory where Youhei Sunohara lives. Throughout the series, glimpses into an Illusionary World are shown.

There are recurring themes that appear throughout the series. The main theme is the value of having a family, as the title of the series implies because the main scenario writer Jun Maeda mistakenly thought the name of the Irish band Clannad meant "clan" or "family" in Irish, which is just "clann". Of the six main characters, Tomoya, Nagisa, and Kotomi do not have siblings, but their parents are major factors in their stories. Nagisa's story was written to incorporate what Maeda described as a "perfect family" with a focus on mental consciousness. In Nagisa's story, there is a recurring appearance of "The Big Dango Family" (だんご大家族, Dango Daikazoku) (a fictional group mascot for children) that Nagisa is fond of. Tomoya and Nagisa's characters were written in a style to exemplify a "growth to adulthood" by the end of the story. Fuko and Kyou's stories have their sisters playing an integral part, while Tomoyo's is influenced by her entire family. A minor motif of Irish words continues with the opening theme of the game, "Mag Mell", which means roughly "plain of joy" and is connected with Irish mythology. The arrange album, a short music CD that contained remixed versions of songs in the game, that was bundled with the original game release was titled Mabinogi, which was a collection of prose stories from medieval Welsh manuscript.

=== Plot ===
Clannad revolves Tomoya Okazaki, a third year high school student who dislikes his life. Tomoya's mother (Atsuko) died when Tomoya was young, leaving his father (Naoyuki) to raise him. After the accident, Tomoya's father turned to alcohol and gambling, with frequent fights with his son. One day, Naoyuki slammed Tomoya against the window in a family argument. dislocating Tomoya's shoulder. This injury prevents Tomoya from playing on the basketball team, and causes him to distance himself from others. Since then, the two men are estranged with each other.

At the beginning of the school year, Tomoya meets Nagisa Furukawa, a strange girl who is one year older than he is and repeating her last year in high school due to being sick much of the previous year. She aims to join the drama club, but cannot do so due to her sickness. However, they find that the drama club was disbanded after a few remaining members graduated. Tomoya helps Nagisa to reform the drama club before meeting several other girls whom he gets to know well and help with their individual problems.

In After Story, Tomoya and Nagisa get married and start to live together. Just after Nagisa gives birth to their daughter, Ushio, she dies, which causes Tomoya to become depressed. As a result, Nagisa's parents – Akio and Sanae – take care of their granddaughter. Five years later, Tomoya meets with Shino Okazaki, his paternal grandmother. Shino tells Tomoya about his father's traumatic past, after which he resolves to raise Ushio and recognizes Naoyuki as his father. Shortly after Tomoya overcomes his depression, Ushio suffers the same disease that Nagisa had. Tomoya, Sanae, and Akio struggle to save him but all of their efforts turn out terribly. The next winter, wanting to do anything for his daughter, Tomoya takes her on a trip, but she dies shortly afterwards.

== Characters ==
=== Main characters ===
The girls of Clannad. Clockwise from top left: Tomoyo, Kotomi, Kyou, Fuko, and Nagisa in the center.

Tomoya Okazaki (岡崎 朋也, Okazaki Tomoya)
Voiced by: Kentaro Ito (DVD bundled with PS2 game), Yūichi Nitta (Tomoyo After: It's a Wonderful Life, RPG mode only), Kenji Nojima (drama CD, movie), Yūichi Nakamura (anime, Tomoyo After) (Japanese); David Matranga (English)
Tomoya is the main protagonist of series. He is a student at Hikarizaka High School and is referred to as a delinquent who frequently arrives to school late and skips classes, but does not generally start fights. His mother, Atsuko, died in a car crash when he was young and since then has been living with his father, Naoyuki, although they argue constantly.
Nagisa Furukawa (古河 渚, Furukawa Nagisa)
Voiced by: Mai Nakahara (Japanese); Luci Christian (English)
Nagisa is the shy and sensitive main heroine. She shouts the names of food that she plans to eat as a way to motivate herself, such as an anpan. Nagisa admires an outdated group mascot known as the "Dango Daikazoku" (だんご大家族; lit. 'Big Dango Family') and explains that she likes the fact that they are a close family regardless of the situation.
Kyou Fujibayashi (藤林 杏, Fujibayashi Kyō)
Voiced by: Ryō Hirohashi (Japanese); Shelley Calene-Black (English)
Kyou is the older of the Fujibayashi twins who is in the same class as Tomoya. She is her class representative, but rarely considers it crucial. She has a pet boar named Botan and drives a moped.
Kotomi Ichinose (一ノ瀬 ことみ, Ichinose Kotomi)
Voiced by: Mamiko Noto (Japanese); Emily Neves (English)
Tomoya's childhood friend, Kotomi is a studious girl who is in the top ten for every subject throughout the whole country in standardized exam results. She always goes to the library to read extra materials, especially foreign books.
Tomoyo Sakagami (坂上 智代, Sakagami Tomoyo)
Voiced by: Houko Kuwashima (Japanese); Kaytha Coker (English), Ryōko Tanaka (Tomoyo After)
Tomoyo transferred to Hikarizaka High School as a second-year student during spring. She is a strong silent girl who is known to be intimidating. Although Tomoya is older than she is, she does not show him his due respect as a senior student. Despite being a transfer student, she aims to become the student council president, wanting to protect the school's cherry blossom trees. She has a younger brother named Takafumi (鷹文).
Fuko Ibuki (伊吹 風子, Ibuki Fūko)
Voiced by: Ai Nonaka (Japanese); Hilary Haag (English)
Fuko is a first-year student at Hikarizaka High School. She is a mysterious girl who is always alone, making wood carvings of starfish with a small knife to give to others as presents.
Ushio Okazaki (岡崎 汐, Okazaki Ushio)
Voiced by: Satomi Koorogi (Japanese); Luci Christian (English)
Ushio is Tomoya and Nagisa's daughter and a student at Kyou's kindergarten. She appears prominently in After Story and in the movie. Ushio resembles her mother a lot and likes the Big Dango Family as well.

=== Secondary characters ===
Youhei Sunohara (春原 陽平, Sunohara Yōhei)
Voiced by: Daisuke Sakaguchi (Japanese); Greg Ayres (English)
Youhei is Tomoya's friend and also a delinquent. He entered the school on an athletic recommendation in soccer, but was kicked out of the soccer club after being involved in a fight with other members who had a tendency of harassing the younger players. After this incident, he became lazy, becoming the only student with a higher absence rate than Tomoya.
Yukine Miyazawa (宮沢 有紀寧, Miyazawa Yukine)
Voiced by: Atsuko Enomoto (Japanese); Maggie Flecknoe (English)
Yukine is a second year student who hangs out in the library's reference room during lunchtime. Tomoya first meets her there while trying to find a how to book about speeches for Nagisa.
Ryou Fujibayashi (藤林 椋, Fujibayashi Ryō)
Voiced by: Akemi Kanda (Japanese); Brittney Karbowski (English)
Ryou is Tomoya's classmate and class representative. She is the younger of the Fujibayashi twins. In contrast to Kyou, she is timid and does not cook well, but good at doing chores. Ryou believes fortune telling, but her predictions always become either somewhat skewed or extremely wrong. She is a major supporting character in both Kyou and Kappei's paths.
Misae Sagara (相楽 美佐枝, Sagara Misae)
Voiced by: Satsuki Yukino (Japanese); Elizabeth Bunch (English)
Misae Sagara is the resident manager at Tomoya and Youhei's all-boys dorm. She was Hikarizaka's first female student council president when she was in high school. Misae achieved a full week of perfect attendance for the whole student body and loved by the students. Misae is friendly with the dorm students but strict when it comes to the rules.
Yusuke Yoshino (芳野 祐介, Yoshino Yūsuke)
Voiced by: Hikaru Midorikawa (Japanese); Illich Guardiola (English)
Yusuke is an electrician who once attended Hikarizaka High School, was a rock musician, and is engaged to Kouko.
Kouko Ibuki (伊吹 公子, Ibuki Kōko)
Voiced by: Yūko Minaguchi (Japanese); Stephanie Wittels (English)
Kouko is Fuko's older sister. She used to be an art teacher at Hikarizaka High School and treats everyone well. Kouko is a regular customer of Furukawa Bakery and Nagisa admires her very much, being her former art teacher. She is engaged to Yusuke Yoshino.
Toshio Koumura (幸村 俊夫, Kōmura Toshio)
Voiced by: Takeshi Aono (Japanese); Todd Waite (English)
Toshio Koumura is a language teacher at Hikarizaka High School and Tomoya's home room teacher during his first year. His age conceals his once vigorous past marked by his enthusiasm in teaching.
Kappei Hiiragi (柊 勝平, Hiiragi Kappei)
Voiced by: Ryōko Shiraishi
Kappei is a mysterious young man who travels and only appears in the game. Tomoya meets Kappei if he chooses to avoid Kyou's scooter on the right side. Kyou intends to hit Tomoya as revenge for Botan coming home wet, but hits Kappei instead. While stunned, a kind girl helped him recover before leaving quickly. Unbeknownst to her, she left her handkerchief behind. Kappei aims to find a job and the kind person that he met after the crash.

=== Families ===
Naoyuki Okazaki (岡崎 直幸, Okazaki Naoyuki)
Voiced by: Hiroshi Naka (Japanese); Chris Hutchison (English)
Naoyuki is Tomoya's father. His wife, Atsuko, died in an accident when Tomoya was young, leaving only himself to raise Tomoya. Afterwards, Naoyuki turned to alcohol and gambling and frequently fought with his son.
Shino Okazaki (岡崎 史乃, Okazaki Shino)
Voiced by: Miyoko Asō (Japanese); Stephanie Wittels (English)
Shino is Tomoya's paternal grandmother who only appears in After Story. During Ushio's path, when Ushio is finding her toy robot she lost in the flower field, Tomoya meets Shino at the edge of the cape, who introduces herself to him and their meeting is planned by Sanae. Shino tells the story of Naoyuki's past and the tragedy after Atsuko's death which is similar to what Tomoya is facing after Nagisa's death, along with his sacrifices made for Tomoya just to see him grow up to be a proper man.
Akio Furukawa (古河 秋生, Furukawa Akio)
Voiced by: Ryotaro Okiayu (Japanese); Andrew Love (English)
Akio is Nagisa's father and Sanae's husband. He looks younger than he is and is shown to be an avid smoker. Although he often talks and plays rough, in addition to having a reckless personality, he is kind and sympathetic. His childish side makes it easy for kids and adults alike to befriend him. He runs the Furukawa Bakery with his wife, Sanae.
Sanae Furukawa (古河 早苗, Furukawa Sanae)
Voiced by: Kikuko Inoue (Japanese); Kara Greenberg (English)
Sanae is Nagisa's mother and Akio's wife. Normally, she is very childish and a crybaby, but when needed she can be very strong-willed and dependable. She manages Furukawa Bakery with her husband and often invents strange new concoctions to make breads that are anything but edible and almost never sell.
Mei Sunohara (春原 芽衣, Sunohara Mei)
Voiced by: Yukari Tamura (Japanese); Serena Varghese (English)
Mei is Youhei's younger sister who loves him and lives in the countryside. She is a smart girl who likes to see new things and a fan of Yusuke Yoshino.

=== Illusionary World ===
Girl in the Illusionary World (謎の少女, Nazo no Shōjo)
Voiced by: Tomoko Kawakami (Japanese); Melissa Davis (English)
The only human in the Illusionary World, a world that both Nagisa and Tomoya have dreams of, and is the basis for the play Nagisa puts on after successfully reinstating the drama club. The girl creates a body out of junk for an unnamed entity only referred to as "I" so that she will not be alone anymore. She created the Illusionary World to collect enough lights to make a miracle possible to save her family from their tragic fate, but has no memory of this.
Junk Robot (ガラクタの人形, Garakuta no Ningyō)
Voiced by: Akiko Yajima (Japanese); Shannon Emerick (English)
The nameless robot who narrates events in the Illusionary World as seen through Tomoya's dream while referring to himself only as "I". His body was created by the girl in the Illusionary World out of junk so that she would not be alone. The robot is about half the girl's height and cannot talk as he had been created without a mouth, so he relies on body language to communicate with her.

== Other characters ==
Rie Nishina (仁科 りえ, Nishina Rie)
Voiced by: Chisako Tatsumi (game), Mai Aizawa (drama CD and anime) (Japanese); Rozie Curtis (English)
Rie is a second-year student at Hikarizaka Private High School who used to play the violin as a child and won many competitions. She had a lot of talent and was supposed to study abroad, but she was involved in an accident. As a result, her grip became weak and she was unable to play the violin as well as she had previously been able to, having lost her main aim in life.
Sugisaka (杉坂, Sugisaka)
Voiced by: Ai Bandō (Japanese) (Japanese); Lesley Tesh (English)
Sugisaka is a member of the choir club. She appears when Nagisa asks them if they could have Toshio Koumura as their supervisor. Sugisaka refuses and even threatens to hurt Nagisa if she tries to reestablish the drama club. Youhei, Tomoya, and Nagisa eventually confront her after school.
Katsuki Shima (志麻 賀津紀, Shima Katsuki)
Voiced by: Romi Park (Japanese); Shannon Emerick (English)
Katsuki was Misae's boyfriend for a while. It is revealed that Katsuki is a boy who Misae met in the past while he was in a wheelchair in the hospital. Her kind words encouraged him to recover. Years later, he searches for her with the hopes of paying her back. However, he is not the real Katsuki Shima because the real Katsuki died, but not having been able to thank Misae and grant her wish, he entrusted this mission to his cat, who took a human form. During the main Clannad series, the cat is often seen accompanying Misae around.
Gentleman (紳士, Shinshi)
Voiced by: Yutaka Aoyama (Japanese); Rob Mungle (English)
The unnamed gentleman is a strange man who in Kotomi's arc one day approaches her on the street.
Yu (勇)
Voiced by: Azuma Sakamoto (Japanese); Corey Hartzog (English)
Yu is a young boy who first appears in Yukine's arc. He is first seen locking arms with Yukine because his sister is with Kazuto's gang.
Atsuko Okazaki (岡崎 敦子, Okazaki Atsuko)
Atsuko is Tomoya's mother and Naoyuki's wife. She died in a traffic accident during Tomoya's early childhood, rendering him unable to retain any memories of her and leaving Naoyuki to raise him as a single parent.
Kazuto Miyazawa (宮沢 和人, Miyazawa Kazuto)
Kazuto is the brother of Yukine Miyazawa. He was a delinquent, but kind to his sister.
Botan (ボタン, Botan)
Voiced by: Machiko Kawana (Japanese); Melissa Davis (English)
Botan is Kyou's pet baby boar who serves as comic relief.

== Development ==
The executive producer for Clannad was Takahiro Baba from Visual Arts, the publishing company which controls Key. Jun Maeda, who was one of three main scenario writers with Kai, and Yūichi Suzumoto, led the planning for Clannad and wrote the majority of the scenarios. Scenario assistance was provided by Tōya Okano. Itaru Hinoue headed the art direction, and also worked on the character design. Miracle Mikipon, Mochisuke, Na-Ga, and Shinory supplemented the computer graphics. Torino provided the background art. The game's music was composed by Maeda, Shinji Orito, and Magome Togoshi.

For Key's second visual novel Air, Maeda admitted he felt he was able to write what he wanted to for the game's scenario, but he later discovered that Air was difficult for players to receive and experience. Due to this, Maeda felt that for Key's next work Clannad, he had a sense of duty to make the game easier to receive for as many users as possible. In any case, he wanted to make it an entertaining game, and started planning on Clannad almost immediately after Air's completion. From the start of Clannad's planning, Maeda did not want to write a story like in Air, but instead wanted to focus on writing a deep connection between the 'people and the town', and 'humanity'. Maeda noted that he exceeded his writing ability when writing most of the scenarios in Clannad, and equates Clannad's writing process as a "wall that I will never be able to get over again." While at the beginning Maeda felt he was prepared, the entire game's story started to increase to a level Maeda never predicted, and Suzumoto noted that it approximately doubled in size from the original projected length. Suzumoto attributed the increase due to the lengthening structure of the game's base scenario which caused the 'branch' scenarios to increase as well.

There were more concerns about Clannad being similar to Air. When Nagisa's scenario was being written, there were some disputes concerning the length of her scenario, and thus putting too much focus on the main heroine. Some were concerned that having a single prominent character with a unique storyline would be too much like how Air was structured with the overall focus on Misuzu Kamio. Takahiro Baba, the company president of VisualArt's, is even noted as suggesting to minimize the differences between the other characters' scenarios, but this was ultimately ignored since Maeda thought the game's evaluation by players would not decrease on account of the scenarios being vastly different, and thought the result was a good one. Maeda was concerned that the After Story arc, mainly a continuation of Nagisa's scenario, would eclipse the entire game's scenario, much like what happened with Air according to Maeda. In order to prevent the same thing happening in Clannad, Maeda focused on making the first half of the story, the School Life arc, just as enjoyable by making it long and heart-breaking. Clannad is Key's second longest work, as reported by Yūto Tonokawa where he stated that Clannad is about 4,000 words fewer than Key's 2008 game Little Busters! Ecstasy.

=== Release history ===
Key announced in 2001 a release date of 2002 for Clannad and, after several postponements, Clannad was released on April 28, 2004, as a limited-edition version, playable on a Windows PC as a DVD. The limited edition came bundled with the remix album Mabinogi remixing background music tracks featured in the visual novel. The regular edition was released on August 6, 2004; While Clannad originally had no voice acting, Key released a version for Windows titled Clannad Full Voice on February 29, 2008, with full voice acting (except for Tomoya). Clannad Full Voice contained one new CG, and had updated support for Windows Vista PCs. Clannad Full Voice was re-released by Key under the name Clannad on July 31, 2009, in a box set containing five other Key visual novels called Key 10th Memorial Box. An updated version compatible for Windows 7 PCs titled Clannad Memorial Edition was released on May 28, 2010.

Clannad was released for Windows on Steam by Sekai Project in English on November 23, 2015. In November 2014, Sekai Project used the crowdfunding website Kickstarter to raise funds to produce the English translation of Clannad. After less than 24 hours, the project reached its goal of US$140,000. When the Kickstarter campaign reached its US$320,000 stretch goal, Sekai Project announced that they would also be translating and releasing the Hikari Mimamoru Sakamichi de side stories for Windows. Overall, the Kickstarter campaign raised US$541,161, exceeding all of its stretch goals. Hikari Mimamoru Sakamichi de was released on Steam on June 2, 2016, titled Clannad Side Stories.

The first consumer console port of the game was released for the PlayStation 2 (PS2) on February 23, 2006, by Interchannel. The PS2 version was re-released as a "Best" version on July 30, 2009. The PS2 version was bundled in a "Key 3-Part Work Premium Box" package together with the PS2 versions of Kanon and Air released on July 30, 2009. An Xbox 360 version was released on August 28, 2008, also by Prototype. A PlayStation 3 (PS3) version was released by Prototype on April 21, 2011. A downloadable version of the PS3 release via the PlayStation Store was released by Prototype on February 14, 2013.

A version produced by NTT DoCoMo playable on FOMA mobile phones was released by Prototype through VisualArt's Motto on November 26, 2007. Prototype later released a version playable on SoftBank 3G phones on January 16, 2008. A version playable on Android devices was released on September 18, 2012. A PlayStation Portable (PSP) version of the game was released in Japan on May 29, 2008, by Prototype, which included the additions from the Windows full voice version. The limited-edition release of the PSP and Xbox 360 versions came bundled with a "digest" edition of the drama CD series released by Prototype containing five separate stories each; the CD bundled with the PSP release is different from the CD bundled with the Xbox 360 version. Prototype also released a port of the game for the PlayStation Vita on August 14, 2014, to mark the 10-year anniversary of the game. Prototype released a PlayStation 4 port on June 14, 2018, with text support for both Japanese and English. Prototype released a Nintendo Switch port on July 4, 2019, again with text support for both Japanese and English, and a digital release of the game became available on the Nintendo eShop on the same day. The Switch port received a limited physical release in a regular and collector's editions via Limited Run Games for a six-week preorder period from April 14 to May 29, 2020.

== Adaptations ==
- Clannad
- Genre: Romance, slice of life, tragedy
- Print media
- Light novel: Official Another Story Clannad: Hikari Mimamoru Sakamichi de; Manga: Clannad Official Comic; Official Another Story Clannad: Hikari Mimamoru Sakamichi de; Clannad; Clannad: Tomoyo Dearest
- Anime television series

Clannad (2007–2008) Clannad After Story (2008–2009)
- Directed by: Tatsuya Ishihara
- Written by: Fumihiko Shimo
- Music by: Jun Maeda; Magome Togoshi; Shinji Orito
- Studio: Kyoto Animation
- Licensed by: Crunchyroll (Note: In Australia via Madman Anime and the United Kingdom via Crunchyroll UK and Ireland.): NA: Sentai Filmworks (Note: Sentai was founded in 2008 a year prior to ADV Films dissolution.)
- Original network: JNN (TBS, MBS, CBC, BS-i)
- English network: NA: Anime Network
- Original run: October 4, 2007 – March 26, 2009
- Episodes: 47 + 2 OVA
- Film
- Clannad
- icon

=== Books and publications ===
A magazine-sized 39-page book called pre-Clannad was published by SoftBank Creative on April 15, 2004. The book contained images from the visual novel, and short explanations of the characters, along with production sketches and concept drawings. A 160-page visual fan book was published by Enterbrain on October 12, 2004, which contained detailed story explanations, computer graphics, sheet music for the opening and ending themes, and interviews from the creators. Near the end of the book contains original illustrations of Clannad characters from various artists, three additional chapters of the Official Another Story, and production sketches.

A set of 14 illustrated short stories which added to Clannad's story were serialized between the September 2004 and October 2005 issues of ASCII Media Works' Dengeki G's Magazine. Titled Official Another Story Clannad: Hikari Mimamoru Sakamichi de (Official Another Story Clannad 光見守る坂道で, Official Another Story Clannad: On the Hillside Path that Light Watches Over), there were 13 regular chapters and one extra bonus chapter. The installments were written by Key's scenario staff and each story was accompanied by illustrations by Japanese artist GotoP. Two more stories were included when they were collected into a 103-page bound volume released on November 25, 2005.

Hikari Mimamoru Sakamichi de was later re-released via SoftBank 3G and FOMA mobile phones produced by Prototype through VisualArt's Motto starting in January 2008. One chapter was released weekly with the SoftBank 3G releases three weeks behind the version for FOMA phones. The collection was released as downloadable content via Xbox Live for the Xbox 360 version of Clannad released on August 28, 2008. Prototype again re-released the short story collection, this time on the PSP in two volumes, each containing eight chapters and including the original art by GotoP. The first volume was released on June 3, 2010, and the second followed on July 15, 2010; the re-release is described by the developers as a "visual sound novel". Prototype released the short story collection as downloadable content on July 6, 2011, for the PS3 version of Clannad. Hikari Mimamoru Sakamichi de was released in two volumes on Android devices: the first volume on November 30, 2011, and volume two on April 11, 2012. Prototype ported it to the Nintendo Switch on May 20, 2021, with text support for both Japanese and English.

Two Clannad anthology character novels were written by several authors and published by Jive in September and December 2004. The first volume of a short story anthology compilation series written by Hiro Akizuki and Mutsuki Misaki titled Clannad. (くらなど。) was released in November 2008 published by Harvest; the third volume was released in October 2009. Three volumes of a short story compilation series by several authors titled Clannad SSS were published by Harvest between June and August 2009. Harvest published a novel titled Clannad Mystery File in August 2010 and another novel titled Clannad: Magic Hour in December 2010.

=== Manga ===
The first manga illustrated by Juri Misaki titled Clannad Official Comic was serialized in Jive's manga magazine Comic Rush between the May 2005 and April 2009 issues. Jive published eight tankōbon volumes between November 7, 2005, and March 7, 2009. The second manga, titled Official Another Story Clannad: Hikari Mimamoru Sakamichi de and illustrated by Rino Fujii, was serialized between June 21, 2007, and August 21, 2008, in Flex Comix's Comi Digi + magazine, and contained 11 chapters. The story for the second manga was adapted from the Clannad short story collection of the same name. The first volume for Official Another Story Clannad was released by Broccoli on February 21, 2008, in a limited and regular edition, each with their own cover. The limited edition comes bundled with a small black notebook with the school emblem of Tomoya's school on the cover. In order to commemorate the sale, an autograph session with the manga's illustrator signing copies was held on March 2, 2008, at Gamers in Nagoya, Japan. The second and final volume, again in limited and regular editions, was released on December 20, 2008.

A third Clannad manga illustrated by Shaa began serialization in the August 2007 issue of ASCII Media Works' Dengeki G's Magazine, published on June 30, 2007. The manga ended serialization in Dengeki G's Magazine in the July 2009 issue, and was serialized in Dengeki G's Festival! Comic between October 26, 2009, and April 28, 2014. ASCII Media Works published five volumes for Shaa's Clannad manga under their Dengeki Comics imprint between February 27, 2008, and July 26, 2014. A fourth manga, titled Clannad: Tomoyo Dearest and illustrated by Yukiko Sumiyoshi, was serialized between February 20 and August 20, 2008, in Fujimi Shobo's Dragon Age Pure magazine. The story centers on Tomoyo's arc from the Clannad visual novel. A single volume for Clannad: Tomoyo Dearest was released on October 9, 2008.

There have also been four sets of manga anthologies produced by different companies and drawn by a multitude of different artists. The first volume of the earliest anthology series, released by Ohzora under the title Clannad, was released in June 2004 under their Twin Heart Comics imprint. Volumes for this series continued to be released until April 2005 with the fifth volume. The second anthology was released in a single volume by Jive on January 25, 2005, titled Clannad Comic Anthology: Another Symphony. The third anthology series was released in two volumes by Ichijinsha on June 25, 2004, and July 24, 2004, under their DNA Media Comics; a third special volume was released much later on December 25, 2007. The first volume of the last anthology series, a collection of four-panel comic strips released by Enterbrain under the title Magi-Cu 4-koma Clannad, was released on February 25, 2008, under their MC Comics imprint; the tenth volume in the series was released on August 26, 2009. Each of the anthology series are written and drawn by an average of 20 people per volume.

=== Drama CDs ===
There are two separate sets of drama CDs based on the Clannad series. The first set, produced by Frontier Works, contains five CDs each focusing on a different heroine in Clannad's story ranging from Nagisa, to Kotomi, Fuko, Kyou, and Tomoyo. The first volume was released in Japan on April 25, 2007, as a limited edition with an extra track added. The second through fifth volumes followed in one month increments between May 25, 2007, and August 24, 2007. The second set, produced by Prototype, contains four CDs; the first was released on July 25, 2007. Volumes two through four were released in one month intervals after that, with the last being released on October 24, 2007. Each CD is based on the stories from the Official Another Story Clannad: Hikari Mimamoru Sakamichi de collection. The artist GotoP, who provided the illustrations for the short stories, also illustrates the drama CD covers. The drama CDs, with text and visuals, are available as downloadable content via Xbox Live and the PlayStation Store when playing the Xbox 360 and PS3 versions of Clannad, respectively.

=== Film ===
Toei Animation (the same team who worked on the original Kanon anime and Air film) announced at the Tokyo Anime Fair on March 23, 2006, that an animated film would be produced. The Clannad film was released on September 15, 2007, directed by the same director of the Air film, Osamu Dezaki, and the screenplay was written by Makoto Nakamura. The film is a reinterpretation of the Clannad storyline which centers on the story arc of the female lead Nagisa Furukawa. The film was released on DVD in three editions: the Collector's Edition, the Special Edition, and the Regular Edition on March 7, 2008. Sentai Filmworks released an English-subbed and dubbed version of the film in March 2011.

=== Anime series ===
On March 15, 2007, the Japanese television station BS-i announced a Clannad anime series via a short 30-second teaser trailer that was featured at the end of the final episode of the second Kanon anime series. Clannad is produced by Kyoto Animation, directed by Tatsuya Ishihara, and written by Fumihiko Shimo, who also worked on other adaptations of Key's visual novels Air and Kanon. The anime aired between October 4, 2007, and March 27, 2008, containing 23 aired episodes out of a planned 24; the broadcast time was first announced on August 11, 2007, at the TBS festival Anime Festa, which is also when the first episode was showcased. The anime series was released in a set of eight DVD compilations released between December 19, 2007, and July 16, 2008, by Pony Canyon, with each compilation containing three episodes. Of the 24 episodes, 23 were aired on television with the first 22 being regular episodes, followed by an additional extra episode. The last episode was released as an original video animation (OVA) on the eighth DVD on July 16, 2008, and is set in an alternate universe from the anime series where Tomoya and Tomoyo are dating, which is based on Tomoyo's scenario in the game. The OVA episode was previewed on May 31, 2008, for an audience of four-hundred people picked via a mail-in postcard campaign. A Blu-ray box set of Clannad was released on April 30, 2010.

After the ending of the 23rd episode of the first Clannad anime series, a 15-second teaser trailer aired promoting a second season titled Clannad After Story. The anime is again animated by Kyoto Animation, and animates the After Story arc from the visual novel, which is a continuation of Nagisa's story, into 24 episodes. The same staff and cast from the first anime were used and the series broadcast in Japan between October 3, 2008, and March 26, 2009. Of the 24 episodes, 22 are regular episodes, the 23rd is an extra episode, and the last episode is a summary episode showcasing highlights from the series. The episodes were released on eight DVD compilation volumes between December 3, 2008, and July 1, 2009. The eighth DVD volume came with an additional OVA episode set in an alternate universe from the anime series where Tomoya and Kyou are dating. The OVA episode was previewed on May 24, 2009, to a limited number of people. A BD box set of Clannad After Story was released on April 20, 2011, in Japan with English subtitles.

In 2008, Section23 Films through Sentai Filmworks licensed the Clannad anime series, and ADV Films localized and distributed the television series and the OVA starting with the first half season box set consisting of 12 episodes with English subtitles, Japanese audio, and no English language track, which was released on March 3, 2009. The second half season box set containing the remaining episodes was released on May 5, 2009. Sentai Filmworks licensed the Clannad After Story anime series; Section23 Films localized and distributed both the television series and OVA starting with the first half season box set with English subtitles released on October 20, 2009. The second half box set was released on December 8, 2009. Sentai Filmworks re-released Clannad in a complete collection set on June 15, 2010, which featured an English dub, produced at Seraphim Digital. The English dub premiered on March 25, 2010, on the Anime Network. Sentai Filmworks re-released Clannad After Story with an English dub on April 19, 2011, and re-released Clannad on BD in November 2011. In the UK and Ireland, Clannad was released on DVD on August 5, 2013, and Clannad After Story was released on September 9, 2013, by Manga Entertainment. Funimation released Clannad and Clannad After Story on Blu-ray in the UK and Ireland on April 26, 2021.

For the first season, the opening theme is "'Mag Mell' (cuckool mix 2007)" by Eufonius and the ending theme is "Dango Daikazoku" (だんご大家族, The Big Dango Family) by Chata. For the second season, the opening theme is "Toki o Kizamu Uta" (時を刻む唄, A Song to Pass the Time) and the ending theme is "Torch"; both songs are sung by Lia.

=== Internet radio shows ===
An Internet radio show to promote the Clannad anime series called Nagisa to Sanae no Omae ni Rainbow (渚と早苗のおまえにレインボー) was broadcast between October 5, 2007, and October 3, 2008, containing 52 episodes. The show, produced by Onsen and Animate TV, was hosted by Mai Nakahara, who played Nagisa Furukawa in the anime, and Kikuko Inoue, who played Sanae Furukawa, and was streamed online every Friday. Several voice actors from the anime adaptation appeared on the show as guests who included Ryō Hirohashi (as Kyou), Atsuko Enomoto (as Yukine), Akemi Kanda (as Ryou), Yuichi Nakamura (as Tomoya), and Daisuke Sakaguchi (as Youhei). A two-disc CD compilation containing the show's first 13 broadcasts was produced on June 18, 2008. The second two-disc CD compilation containing the 14th through 26th broadcasts was released on October 15, 2008, and a third CD volume followed on November 19, 2008. A fourth and final volume was released on February 18, 2009, containing the rest of the broadcasts.

A second Internet radio show to promote the Clannad After Story anime series called Nagisa to Sanae to Akio no Omae ni Hyper Rainbow (渚と早苗と秋生のおまえにハイパーレインボー) was broadcast between October 10, 2008, and April 10, 2009, containing 26 episodes. The show was also produced by Onsen and Animate TV, and was streamed online every Friday. The show had three hosts including the previous two plus Ryōtarō Okiayu who plays Akio Furukawa in the anime series. Two two-disc CD compilations were released containing the second radio shows broadcasts, the first released on February 18, 2009, followed by the second on May 29, 2009.

== Music ==
The Clannad visual novel has four pieces of theme music: one opening theme, two ending themes, and an insert song. The opening theme is "Mag Mell" (メグメル, Megu Meru) by Eufonius. The two ending themes are "-Kage Futatsu-" (-影二つ-, -Two Shadows-) and "Chiisana Tenohira" (小さなてのひら, Small Palms) sung by Riya of Eufonius; the latter is used as the ending theme in the After Story arc. The insert song "Ana" is sung by Lia. Six of the characters have background music leitmotifs—the five heroines, and Yukine Miyazawa. Nagisa's theme is the self-titled "Nagisa" (渚); Kyou's theme is "Sore wa Kaze no Yōni" (それは風のように, That's Like the Wind); Kotomi's theme is "Étude Pour les Petites Supercordes"; Tomoyo's theme is "Kanojo no Honki" (彼女の本気, Her Determination); Fuko's theme is "Hurry, Starfish" (は〜りぃすたーふぃしゅ, Ha~rī Sutāfisshu); lastly, Yukine's theme is "Shiryōshitsu no Ochakai" (資料室のお茶会, Tea Party in the Reference Room).

An image song album titled Sorarado was released in December 2003 featuring songs sung by Riya. A remix album, Mabinogi, came bundled with the original release of Clannad in April 2004. The game's original soundtrack was released in August 2004 containing three discs containing 56 tracks. A follow-up to Sorarado was released in December 2004 called Sorarado Append; the songs were again sung by Riya. A remix album titled -Memento- was also released in December 2004 and contained two discs. A piano arrangement album was released in December 2005 called Piano no Mori, which contained five tracks from Clannad and five from Tomoyo After: It's a Wonderful Life. Each of the albums released for the visual novel version were released on Key's record label Key Sounds Label.

A maxi single by Eufonius was released in July 2007 for the Clannad film called "Mag Mell (frequency⇒e Ver.)". The single contained a remix version of the game's opening theme, and instrumental track of that remix, and an original track. An image album titled Yakusoku was released in August 2007 featuring a song sung by Lia, an instrumental version of that song, and two background music tracks used in the film. The film's original soundtrack was released in November 2007. The albums released for the film were produced by Frontier Works. A single was released in October 2007 for the first anime series called "Mag Mell / Dango Daikazoku" which contained the anime's opening and ending themes in original, short, and instrumental versions plus a remix version of "Shōjo no Gensō" (少女の幻想, The Girl's Fantasy), a track featured in Sorarado sung by Riya. A single for the second season anime series was released in November 2008 called "Toki o Kizamu Uta / Torch", and contains the anime's opening and ending themes sung by Lia. A remix album containing piano arrangement versions of the second anime series' opening and ending themes was released in December 2008 called "Toki o Kizamu Uta / Torch" Piano Arrange Disc. The anime series' two singles and one album are released on Key Sounds Label.

== Reception ==
=== Visual novel ===
Reception

Aggregate score
Aggregator	Score
Metacritic	PC: 83/100

Across the national ranking of bishōjo games in amount sold in Japan, the Clannad limited edition Windows release premiered at number one twice since its release, and the third ranking brought the Windows release down to 46 out of 50. The first two weeks of June 2004 held the final ranking for the original release at 40 out of 50. The Clannad regular edition Windows release premiered at number 26 in the rankings. The next two rankings for the regular edition were at 37 and 41. According to sales information taken from the Japanese Amazon website, the original Windows version of Clannad sold 100,560 copies in 2004. Clannad Full Voice ranked twice in terms of highest selling PC games nationally in Japan, achieving sales rankings of 7 and 20 in February and March 2008, respectively. For the week of April 18, 2011, the PlayStation 3 port of Clannad sold 7,466 units. The console versions of Clannad had sold over 113,000 copies by April 18, 2011, and 122,393 copies as of 2019. The two-volume PSP editions of Hikari Mimamoru Sakamichi de sold 28,984 copies by the end of 2010. The English release of the Windows version debuted on the Steam charts at number three, above Call of Duty: Black Ops III and Grand Theft Auto V, and just below Fallout 4 and Counter-Strike: Global Offensive.

In the October 2007 issue of Dengeki G's Magazine, poll results for the 50 best bishōjo games were released. Out of 249 titles, Clannad ranked first at 114 votes; in comparison, the second place title, Fate/stay night, got 78 votes. The PlayStation 2 release in 2006 was reviewed by the Japanese video game magazine Famitsu, which gave it an overall score of 26/40 (out of the four individual review scores of 7, 7, 6, and 6). In 2008, Clannad was voted No. 2 in the Dengeki poll of the most emotional games of all time. In 2011, Clannad was voted No. 4 in Famitsu's poll of the most tear-inducing games of all time. In 2014, Sony Computer Entertainment conducted a poll with over 10,000 Japanese fans, where Clannad was voted No. 18 on the "Most Moving Games Over Books and Movies" list.

Multiplayer.it reviewed the Windows version and scored it 9.2 out of 10. They referred to it as "one of the best visual novels ever made", praising the "rich" dialogues and storytelling, "deep" branching narrative, and "lifelike" characterization, referring to the cast as some of the best "characters ever seen" in video games. RPGFan gave it an overall score of 83%, including 88% for story, 86% gameplay, 74% control, 72% graphics, and 82% sound. The review praised the large number of dialogue choices which "lets you feel involved in how the tale plays out", "many genuinely funny moments," and "emotionally touching" stories, particularly the After Story arc where Clannad "truly excels" with "heart-wrenching" and "emotionally-charged" storytelling, but criticized it for not having enough visuals and for having some "less interesting" side-story paths in the School Life arc which require completion to unlock the After Story arc.

=== Anime ===
The two anime series and film DVDs have shown consistent high sales figures. The first anime limited edition DVD ranked third for the week of December 19 and December 25, 2007. The second through fifth limited edition DVDs all ranked first during their first week of sales, while the sixth limited edition DVD volume was ranked fourth for the week of May 21 and May 27, 2008. The seventh and eighth limited edition DVD volumes both ranked first during their first week of sales. The third limited edition DVD ranked sixth for the most anime DVDs sold between December 2007 and November 2008. A Blu-ray box set of Clannad ranked third for the week of April 26 and May 2, 2010, and ranked again at 13 the following week. The special edition film DVD first ranked at number three during its first week of sales, and dropped down to number 10 the following week.

The first limited edition DVD for Clannad After Story ranked second during its first week of sales selling 17,521 units. The second through fourth limited edition DVDs for Clannad After Story ranked first during their first week of sales each selling over 16,000 units each. The fifth through seventh limited edition DVDs for Clannad After Story ranked first during their first week of sales selling over 14,000 units each. The eighth limited edition DVD for Clannad After Story ranked second during its first week of sales selling over 19,800 units. The sixth limited edition DVD volume ranked again the week of May 11 and May 17, 2009, at number three for anime DVDs. The seventh limited edition DVD volume ranked again the week of June 8 and June 14, 2009, at number six for anime DVDs. The eighth limited edition DVD volume ranked again the week of July 6 and July 12, 2009, at number five for anime DVDs.

For the anime television adaptation, the first season of Clannad received reviews ranging from positive to mixed, while the second season Clannad After Story received wide critical acclaim. The THEM Anime Reviews website gave the entire series a score of 4 out of 5 stars, with reviewer Tim Jones describing the first season as "the most fleshed-out and real Key animated adaption to date," and reviewer Stig Høgset stating that the second season After Story "will play up the tragedies and the drama considerably, quite possibly tearing out your heart in the process. This is where time truly starts to fly by, lending the show some real weight in the emotional departments."

Theron Martin of Anime News Network gave the first season a 'B+' rating, criticizing its extensive use of moe elements, but considered it appealing entertainment for a "fan base who revels in this kind of thing." His review for the second season After Story was much more positive, giving it an 'A−' rating. He praised the second half of the season as "the best-written quarter of Clannad," stating that it "effectively builds up and delivers its emotional appeal, reinforces the series' central theme (i.e. the importance of family), and peaks visually," and concluding that "only the most cynical of souls will avoid shedding at least a few tears at certain points." On the DVD Talk website, the reviewer Todd Douglass Jr. gave Clannad After Story a "Highly Recommended" rating, stating that "the range of emotions Clannad takes you through is quite daunting. It's charming, cute, hilarious, mysterious, and tragic all at the same time. Few shows are as memorable, and few are this good for this long." He concludes that the storytelling is "heartfelt" and "memorable in so many ways," and that "few shows rise to the levels this one does."

=== Legacy ===
Gamania Entertainment hosted a collaboration event with Clannad and their two massively multiplayer online games (MMOGs) Hiten Online and Holy Beast Online. Between March 26 and June 26, 2008, the two games offered costumes characters could wear which looked like the winter school uniforms from Clannad, along with offering Kyou's pet boar Botan for players to adopt. Players of either game who had a character over level 20 could enter a lottery where 500 people were chosen to win Clannad-related goods which included virtual and real-world items such as file folders, "netcash" cards, sports towels, tapestries, and various items used during gameplay.

ASCII Media Works and Vridge produced the PlayStation 2 visual novel Nogizaka Haruka no Himitsu: Cosplay Hajimemashita (乃木坂春香の秘密 こすぷれ、はじめました♥; lit. Haruka Nogizaka's Secret: Cosplaying Has Begun) based on the light novel series Nogizaka Haruka no Himitsu. Released in September 2008, the game features the series' characters cosplaying in various costumes either depicting characters from five popular light novel series published by ASCII Media Works, or three Clannad heroines. Haruka Nogizaka can cosplay as Kotomi Ichinose, Mika Nogizaka can cosplay as Nagisa Furukawa (albeit with long hair), and Shiina Amamiya can cosplay as Tomoyo Sakagami. The player can also view exclusive CGs in the game if one of the girls is taken out to various places while cosplaying as one of the aforementioned five light novel series characters, or as the Clannad heroines. For example, if Mika is cosplaying as Nagisa, a CG of her eating dango can become viewable. When cosplaying as one of these tie-in characters, the voice of the girl cosplaying changes to the voice actress of the character they are cosplaying; for example, if Shiina cosplays as Tomoyo, she is voiced by Tomoyo's voice actress Houko Kuwashima.

A 3D virtual world called Ai Sp@ce was developed by the video game developer Headlock where users can interact with bishōjo game heroines from Clannad, Shuffle!, and Da Capo II. Released in October 2008, the world recreates each game franchise on its own virtual island which are linked with a central Akihabara Island where users can interact, bridging the gap between the separate franchises. Users are able to create a customizable avatar to represent themselves in the game, along with choosing one game heroine to live with, which is referred to as a character doll, or chara-doll for short. The user and chara-doll reside together on one of the three in-game "islands" depending on which franchise the heroine is from, which includes a house with furniture and clothes that can be purchased. The chara-dolls can also be customizable in that they can develop a unique personality for each user.

Characters from Clannad also appear in the Key crossover series Kaginado, which premiered in 2021.
