= Riya =

Riya is a given name. Notable people with the name include:

- Riya, Japanese singer
- Riya Bamniyal, Indian actress
- Riya Deepsi, Indian actress and model
- Riya Sen (born 1981), Indian actress
- Riya Suman, Indian actress
- Riya Vishwanathan, Indian actress
