= Matt Greenfield =

American voice actor

- Born: Matthew Brian Greenfield; January 12, 1965 (age 61); Sacramento, California, U.S.
- Other name: Brian Granveldt
- Occupations: Producer, ADR director, Scriptwriter, Voice Actor
- Years active: 1992–present
- Known for: Co-Founding AD Vision
- Spouse: Tiffany Grant (m. 2003; div. 2018)

Matthew Brian Greenfield (born January 12, 1965) is an American producer, scriptwriter, director and voice actor. He produces English-language versions of Japanese anime, including Neon Genesis Evangelion, and was the co-founder of A.D. Vision.

== Early life ==
Matthew Brian Greenfield was born on January 12, 1965, in Sacramento, California to Patricia (née Doering, born 1938) and Virgil Greenfield (1934–2006). His grandparents, Esther (née Weaver, 1917–2013) and Joseph Doering (1906–1975), worked at jewelry shops in Los Angeles; Esther was also a longtime member of the Shasta Dam Methodist Church (now known as the Shasta Lake Community United Methodist Church).

== Career ==
Originally a fan who ran an anime club in Houston, Texas (known as "Anime NASA") starting in 1985 alongside classmate and AD Vision founder David Williams, Greenfield and Williams met fellow enthusiast John Ledford in 1992 and the three quickly formed AD Vision, a name later condensed to ADV Films. The company, which began as an importer of anime, marketing primarily to the existing network of anime fans, rapidly expanded and soon had its own dedicated dubbing studios and a distribution network that also handled international marketing, licensing and North American home video distribution for a wide variety of other programming, including non-ADV produced animated titles such as Sailor Moon, Robotech, Hello Kitty and ReBoot, and a diverse lineup of live action programming that ranged from Japanese horror and kaiju productions such as Gamera: Guardian of the Universe, Daimajin and the Godzilla film Destroy All Monsters.

Still growing, ADV also launched the first all anime television channel, The Anime Network, and a publishing division that distributed the authorized English version of the popular Japanese magazine Newtype and Japanese manga.

During a nearly 17-year period, Greenfield served first as ADV's general manager, then as a vice president of the company, and was involved with the majority of the company's releases, either as producer or executive producer, until 2009, when ADV ceased actively acquiring new media. By that time, Greenfield had already stepped into place as the front person for two new companies: Switchblade Pictures, which specializes in Japanese live-action exploitation films, and Maiden Japan, an animation label that began operations with the faux ecchi anime, Papillon Rose.

He continues to write and produce English dubs for new companies and distributors such as Sentai Filmworks and Section23 Films via post-production house/dubbing studio Seraphim Digital.

Greenfield has also worked as a voice actor, often going by the pseudonym Brian Granveldt.

He married voice actress Tiffany Grant in 2003 (divorced in 2018). Greenfield is a frequent guest at anime and sci-fi conventions around the world, where he speaks on both the history and future of animation.
