= Aniplex of America =

American anime distributor

- Aniplex of America's logo, the same as used by the parent company
- Type: Subsidiary
- Industry: Anime and music production
- Founded: March 2005; 21 years ago
- Headquarters: 2120 Colorado Avenue, Suite 220, Santa Monica, California, U.S.
- Key people: Yosuke Kodaka (president)
- Products: Soundtracks; anime; music; merchandise
- Parent: Aniplex
- Website: aniplexusa.com

Aniplex of America, or Aniplex USA, is an anime distributor based in Santa Monica, California that serves as the American distribution enterprise of Aniplex, an entertainment company owned by Sony Music Entertainment Japan, where its goal is to reinforce the parent company's licensing business in the North American market. They operate the English language version of the Aniplex+ store, and from 2013 to 2017 operated a streaming service called Aniplex Channel through their website. The company most of the time only directly releases its titles in the Americas, however, some of its titles have been released in other territories by other distributors, such as Anime Limited, MVM Films, Siren Visual and corporate siblings Crunchyroll UK and Ireland (formerly Manga Entertainment) and Crunchyroll Store Australia (formerly Madman Anime).

Their home video sets are distributed in the North American market by its corporate sibling, Crunchyroll Store (formerly Right Stuf), and their titles are usually streamed on Crunchyroll, Disney+, Hulu, and Hidive, and occasionally streamed on Netflix, Amazon Prime Video, and HBO Max. Some of their titles were also available on Anime Strike, Daisuki, Funimation, go90, Crackle, Anime News Network, and Neon Alley but they have been removed and/or the service shut down.

== History ==
=== 2005–2012: Founding and independent distribution ===
Aniplex of America was founded in March 2005. At this point, the Japanese parent company still licensed its titles through other distributors, such as Funimation, Bandai Entertainment, Geneon USA, ADV Films, NIS America, and Media Blasters.

Starting in 2010, Aniplex of America began releasing the Japanese parent company's titles, starting with the Gurren Lagann movies and Durarara!! (which had been previously announced to stream on Crunchyroll). Durarara!! was the first time they partnered with Bang Zoom for an English dub (the studio they would almost exclusively work with for dubs from this point on). They also re-released Read or Die (OVA) and R.O.D the TV on home video, despite them having previously been licensed through Manga Entertainment and Geneon. The aforementioned titles was the first time they sold a home video set on Right Stuf Anime (the website that would eventually be the only retailer in North America to sell their home video sets). Starting with Oreimo in 2010, they started streaming some of their titles on Anime News Network. In April 2011, they started streaming some of their titles on Hulu and Viz Anime (Neon Alley), with Blue Exorcist being the first. In June 2011, they started airing titles on Cartoon Network's late night block Adult Swim, with Durarara!! being the first. In July 2011, they started streaming their titles on Crackle, with Star Driver being the first. In June 2012, they announced that they would release their first non-anime, Hatsune Miku's Mikunopolis concert.

=== 2013–present: Streaming expansion and new management ===
In 2013, Aniplex started streaming some of their titles on their website (called Aniplex Channel). In April 2014, they launched the English version of Aniplex+. Later in April 2014, they started streaming shows on Netflix, with Blue Exorcist being the first. In 2015, they started streaming some of their titles on Daisuki and Funimation. In March 2017, they started streaming some of their titles on Anime Strike, with Eromanga Sensei being the first. In June 2017, they launched their first mobile game, the English version of the Fate/Grand Order mobile game.

In August 2017, it was announced that Shu Nishimoto was appointed as president of the company, with former president Hideki "Henry" Goto becoming head of international business development with the Tokyo branch. Later the same month, Aniplex Channel was shut down. In October 2017, they started streaming some of their titles on go90, which included exclusive rights to the Anohana and God Eater dubs. In January 2019, they started streaming some of their titles on HIDIVE, with The Promised Neverland being the first.

In August 2019, they announced that they partnered with Funimation Films to release Rascal Does Not Dream of a Dreaming Girl in North American theaters. They later did the same with Demon Slayer: Kimetsu no Yaiba – The Movie: Mugen Train.

In January 2020, they allowed Funimation to dub Darwin's Game, which was the first time that a new Aniplex of America title that was dubbed was not dubbed by Bang Zoom. In May 2020, Funimation announced they partnered with Aniplex of America to release a standard edition Blu-ray set for Demon Slayer: Kimetsu no Yaiba. Later in May 2020, they started streaming some of their titles on HBO Max. In December 2020, the company made a partnership with Lucky Helmet Agency to help with merchandising and licensing for the release of Demon Slayer: Kimetsu no Yaiba – The Movie: Mugen Train in the United States.

Yosuke Kodaka is the current president of Aniplex of America as of August 2021.

== Catalog ==
Note: Any anime that has been dubbed in English by anybody, including Aniplex of America themselves, is marked with an asterisk (*) beside the title.

=== Anime ===
- 22/7 (January 2020 – March 2020) (A-1 Pictures)
- Aldnoah.Zero* (July 2014 – March 2015) (A-1 Pictures & Troyca)
- Angel Beats!* (April 2010 – June 2010) (P.A. Works) (acquired from Sentai Filmworks)
- Anohana: The Flower We Saw That Day* (April 2011 – June 2011) (A-1 Pictures) (acquired from NIS America)
  - Anohana the Movie: The Flower We Saw That Day (August 2013) (A-1 Pictures)
- Atri: My Dear Moments (July 2024 – October 2024) (Troyca)
- The Anthem of the Heart (September 2015) (A-1 Pictures)
- The Asterisk War* (October 2015 – June 2016) (A-1 Pictures)
- Auto Boy - Carl from Mobile Land (April 2020 – March 2022) (CloverWorks)
- Baccano!* (July 2007 – November 2007) (Brain's Base) (acquired from Funimation)
- Black Butler* (October 2008 – September 2010) (A-1 Pictures) (acquired from Funimation)
- Blast of Tempest (October 2012 – March 2013) (Bones)
- Blend S (October 2017 – December 2017) (A-1 Pictures)
- Blue Exorcist* (April 2011 – October 2011) (A-1 Pictures)
  - Blue Exorcist: The Movie* (December 2012) (A-1 Pictures)
  - Blue Exorcist: Kyoto Saga* (January 2017 – March 2017) (A-1 Pictures)
  - Blue Exorcist: Shimane Illuminati Saga* (January 2024 – March 2024) (Studio VOLN)
  - Blue Exorcist: Beyond the Snow Saga / The Blue Night Saga* (October 2024 – March 2025) (Studio VOLN)
- Build Divide (October 2021 - June 2022) (Liden Films)
- Cells at Work!* (July 2018 – February 2021) (David Production)
  - Cells at Work! Code Black* (January 2021 – March 2021) (Liden Films)
- Cencoroll Connect (July 2019) (Independent work) (screened at Anime Expo only)
- Charlotte* (July 2015 – September 2015) (P.A. Works)
- Classroom Crisis (July 2015 – September 2015) (Lay-duce)
- Dakaichi -I'm being harassed by the sexiest man of the year- (October 2018 – December 2018) (CloverWorks)
- Darwin's Game* (January 2020 – March 2020) (Nexus)
- Day Break Illusion (July 2013 – September 2013) (AIC)
- Demon Slayer: Kimetsu no Yaiba* (April 2019 – June 2024) (Ufotable)
  - Demon Slayer: Kimetsu no Yaiba – The Movie: Mugen Train* (October 2020) (Ufotable) (theatrical distribution via Funimation Films)
  - Demon Slayer: Kimetsu no Yaiba – To the Swordsmith Village* (February 2023) (Ufotable)
  - Demon Slayer: Kimetsu no Yaiba – To the Hashira Training* (February 2024) (Ufotable)
  - Demon Slayer: Kimetsu no Yaiba – The Movie: Infinity Castle* (July 2025 – present) (Ufotable)
- Do You Love Your Mom and Her Two-Hit Multi-Target Attacks? (July 2019 – September 2019) (J.C.Staff)
- Doukyusei (February 2016) (A-1 Pictures)
- Durarara!!* (January 2010 – June 2010) (Brain's Base)
  - Durarara!!x2* (January 2015 – March 2016) (Shuka)
- The Elusive Samurai* (July 2024 – present) (CloverWorks)
- Engage Kiss* (July 2022 – September 2022) (A-1 Pictures)
- Erased* (January 2016 – March 2016) (A-1 Pictures)
- Eromanga Sensei (April 2017 – June 2017) (A-1 Pictures)
- Even the Student Council Has Its Holes!* (October 2026 – present)
- Expelled from Paradise* (November 2014) (Toei Animation & Graphinica)
- Fate/Apocrypha* (July 2017 – December 2017) (A-1 Pictures) (Netflix Original)
- Fate/EXTRA Last Encore* (January 2018 – July 2018) (Shaft) (Netflix Original)
- Fate/Grand Order: First Order* (December 2016) (Lay-duce)
  - Fate/Grand Order - Absolute Demonic Front: Babylonia* (October 2019 – March 2020) (CloverWorks)
    - Fate/Grand Order Final Singularity - The Grand Temple of Time: Solomon* (July 2021) (CloverWorks)
  - Fate/Grand Order: Moonlight/Lostroom (December 2017) (Lay-duce)
  - Fate/Grand Order: Divine Realm of the Round Table: Camelot* (December 2020 – May 2021) (Part 1 by Signal.MD and Part 2 by Production I.G)
  - Fate/Grand Carnival* (June 2021 – October 2021) (Lerche)
- Fate/stay night: Unlimited Blade Works* (October 2014 – June 2015) (Ufotable)
  - Fate/stay night: Heaven's Feel* (October 2017 – August 2020) (Ufotable)
  - Today's Menu for the Emiya Family (January 2018 – January 2019) (Ufotable)
- Fate/Zero* (October 2011 – June 2012) (Ufotable)
  - The Case Files of Lord El-Melloi II* (July 2019 – September 2019) (Troyca)
- Fullmetal Alchemist: Brotherhood* (April 2009 – July 2010) (Bones) (acquired from Funimation)
  - Fullmetal Alchemist: The Sacred Star of Milos* (July 2011) (Bones) (acquired from Funimation)
- The Garden of Sinners (December 2007 – September 2013) (Ufotable)
- God Eater* (July 2015 – March 2016) (Ufotable) (this is not an Aniplex production)
- Granblue Fantasy The Animation* (April 2017 – December 2019) (Season 1 by A-1 Pictures and Season 2 by MAPPA)
- Grow Up Show* (July 2026 - Scheduled) (A-1 Pictures)
- Gunslinger Stratos: The Animation (April 2015 – June 2015) (A-1 Pictures)
- Gurren Lagann* (April 2007 – September 2007) (Gainax) (acquired from ADV Films and Bandai Entertainment)
  - Gurren Lagann the Movie –Childhood's End–* (September 2008) (Gainax)
  - Gurren Lagann the Movie –The Lights in the Sky Are Stars–* (April 2009) (Gainax)
- Gyo: Tokyo Fish Attack (February 2012) (Ufotable)
- Hell Girl: The Fourth Twilight (July 2017 – September 2017) (Studio Deen)
- High School Fleet (April 2016 – June 2016) (Production IMS)
- I Want to Eat Your Pancreas* (September 2018) (Studio VOLN)
- I've Always Liked You (April 2016) (Qualia Animation)
  - The Moment You Fall in Love (December 2016) (Qualia Animation)
  - Our love has always been 10 centimeters apart (November 2017 – December 2017) (Lay-duce)
- The Irregular at Magic High School* (April 2014 – June 2024) (Season 1 by Madhouse and Seasons 2–3 by 8-Bit)
  - The Irregular at Magic High School: The Movie – The Girl Who Summons the Stars (June 2017) (8-Bit)
  - The Honor Student at Magic High School* (July 2021 – September 2021) (Connect)
  - The Irregular at Magic High School: Reminiscence Arc* (December 2021) (8-Bit)
- Kaguya-sama: Love Is War* (January 2019 – June 2022) (A-1 Pictures)
  - Kaguya-sama: Love Is War – The First Kiss That Never Ends* (December 2022) (A-1 Pictures)
- Katsugeki/Touken Ranbu* (July 2017 – September 2017) (Ufotable)
- Kill la Kill* (October 2013 – March 2014) (Studio Trigger)
- Kiznaiver* (April 2016 – June 2016) (Studio Trigger) (Crunchyroll holds additional rights because they co-produced it)
- Lycoris Recoil* (July 2022 – September 2022) (A-1 Pictures)
- Magi: The Labyrinth of Magic* (October 2012 – March 2013) (A-1 Pictures)
  - Magi: The Kingdom of Magic* (October 2013 – March 2014) (A-1 Pictures)
- March Comes In like a Lion* (October 2016 – March 2018) (Shaft)
- Mashle* (April 2023 – March 2024) (A-1 Pictures)
- Mekakucity Actors (April 2014 – June 2014) (Shaft)
- Meow Meow Japanese History (April 2016 – present) (Joker Films)
- The Millionaire Detective Balance: Unlimited* (April 2020 – September 2020) (CloverWorks)
- Miracle Train (October 2009 – December 2009) (Yumeta Company)
- The Misfit of Demon King Academy* (July 2020 – July 2024) (Silver Link)
- Mono* (April 2025 – June 2025) (Soigne)
- Monogatari (July 2009 – June 2019) (Shaft)
  - Bakemonogatari (July 2009 – September 2009) (Shaft)
  - Nisemonogatari (January 2012 – March 2012) (Shaft)
  - Nekomonogatari (Kuro) (January 2013) (Shaft)
  - Monogatari Series Second Season (July 2013 – December 2013) (Shaft)
  - Hanamonogatari (August 2014) (Shaft)
  - Tsukimonogatari (December 2014) (Shaft)
  - Owarimonogatari (October 2015 – December 2015) (Shaft)
  - Kizumonogatari (January 2016 – January 2017) (Shaft)
  - Koyomimonogatari (January 2016 – March 2016) (Shaft)
  - Owarimonogatari Second Season (August 2017) (Shaft)
  - Zoku Owarimonogatari (May 2019 – June 2019) (Shaft)
- Mushi-Shi -Next Passage- (April 2014 – December 2014) (Artland)
- My Love Story with Yamada-kun at Lv999* (April 2023 – June 2023) (Madhouse)
- Nanana's Buried Treasure (April 2014 – June 2014) (A-1 Pictures)
- Natsume's Book of Friends the Movie: Ephemeral Bond (September 2018) (Shuka)
- Needy Girl Overdose* (April 2026–present) (Yostar Pictures)
- Nier: Automata Ver1.1a* (January 2023 – September 2024) (A-1 Pictures)
- Nisekoi (January 2014 – June 2015) (Shaft)
- Occultic;Nine* (October 2016 – December 2016) (A-1 Pictures)
- Oreimo (October 2010 – June 2013) (AIC Build & A-1 Pictures)
- Oreshura (January 2013 – March 2013) (A-1 Pictures)
- Oresuki (October 2019 – December 2019) (Connect)
- Persona 3 The Movie (November 2013 – January 2016) (Movie 1 by AIC ASTA and Movies 2-4 by A-1 Pictures)
  - Persona 3 The Movie: No. 1, Spring of Birth (November 2013) (AIC ASTA)
  - Persona 3 The Movie: No. 2, Midsummer Knight's Dream (June 2014) (A-1 Pictures)
  - Persona 3 The Movie: No. 3, Falling Down (April 2015) (A-1 Pictures)
  - Persona 3 The Movie: No. 4, Winter of Rebirth (January 2016) (A-1 Pictures)
- Persona 4: The Golden Animation (July 2014 – September 2014) (A-1 Pictures)
- Persona 5: The Animation* (April 2018 – September 2018) (CloverWorks)
  - Persona 5: The Animation -The Day Breakers- (September 2016) (A-1 Pictures)
- Plastic Memories (April 2015 – June 2015) (Doga Kobo)
- Pretty Boy Detective Club* (April 2021 – June 2021) (Shaft)
- The Promised Neverland* (January 2019 – March 2021) (CloverWorks)
- Puella Magi Madoka Magica* (January 2011 – April 2011) (Shaft)
  - Puella Magi Madoka Magica Part 1: Beginnings* (October 2012) (Shaft)
  - Puella Magi Madoka Magica Part 2: Eternal* (October 2012) (Shaft)
  - Puella Magi Madoka Magica Part 3: Rebellion* (October 2013) (Shaft)
  - Magia Record: Puella Magi Madoka Magica Side Story* (January 2020 – March 2020) (Shaft)
- Rascal Does Not Dream of Bunny Girl Senpai* (October 2018 – December 2018) (CloverWorks)
  - Rascal Does Not Dream of a Dreaming Girl* (June 2019) (CloverWorks) (theatrical distribution via Funimation Films)
  - Rascal Does Not Dream of a Sister Venturing Out* (June 2023) (CloverWorks)
  - Rascal Does Not Dream of a Knapsack Kid* (December 2023) (CloverWorks)
  - Rascal Does Not Dream of Santa Claus* (July 2025) (CloverWorks)
- Read or Die* (May 2001) (Studio Deen) (acquired from Manga Entertainment)
  - R.O.D the TV* (October 2003 – March 2004) (J.C.Staff & Studio Deen) (acquired from Geneon)
- Record of Grancrest War* (January 2018 – June 2018) (A-1 Pictures)
- Rurouni Kenshin (1996)* (January 1996 – September 1998) (Studio Gallop & Studio Deen) (acquired from Media Blasters)
  - Rurouni Kenshin: The Motion Picture* (December 1997) (Studio Gallop) (acquired from ADV Films)
  - Rurouni Kenshin OVA: Rurouni Kenshin: Trust & Betrayal* (February 1999 – November 1999) (Studio Deen) (acquired from ADV Films)
  - Rurouni Kenshin OVA: Rurouni Kenshin: Reflection* (December 2001) (Studio Deen) (acquired from ADV Films)
  - Rurouni Kenshin (2023)* (July 2023 – present) (Liden Films)
- Saekano: How to Raise a Boring Girlfriend (January 2015 – March 2015) (A-1 Pictures)
  - Saekano the Movie: Finale (October 2019) (CloverWorks)
- Samurai Flamenco (October 2013 – March 2014) (Manglobe)
- Servant × Service (July 2013 – September 2013) (A-1 Pictures)
- Silver Spoon (July 2013 – March 2014) (A-1 Pictures)
- SK8 the Infinity* (January 2021 – March 2021) (Bones)
- Slow Start (January 2018 – March 2018) (CloverWorks)
- Star Driver (October 2010 – April 2011) (Bones) (acquired from Bandai Entertainment)
- Super HxEros* (July 2020 – September 2020) (Project No.9)
- Sword Art Online* (July 2012 – December 2012) (A-1 Pictures)
  - Sword Art Online: Extra Edition* (December 2013) (A-1 Pictures)
  - Sword Art Online II* (July 2014 – December 2014) (A-1 Pictures)
  - Sword Art Online the Movie: Ordinal Scale* (February 2017) (A-1 Pictures) (theatrical distribution via Sony Pictures)
  - Sword Art Online Alternative: Gun Gale Online* (April 2018 – June 2018) (3Hz)
  - Sword Art Online: Alicization* (October 2018 – September 2020) (A-1 Pictures)
  - Sword Art Online Progressive: Aria of a Starless Night* (October 2021) (A-1 Pictures)
  - Sword Art Online Progressive: Scherzo of Deep Night* (October 2022) (A-1 Pictures)
- Uchitama?! Have you seen my Tama? (January 2020 – March 2020) (MAPPA & Lapin Track)
- Togainu no Chi (October 2010 – December 2010) (A-1 Pictures)
- Tokyo 24th Ward* (January 2022 – April 2022) (CloverWorks)
- UniteUp! (January 2023 – April 2025) (CloverWorks)
- Valvrave the Liberator (April 2013 – December 2013) (Sunrise)
- Vividred Operation (January 2013 – March 2013) (A-1 Pictures)
- Vivy: Fluorite Eye's Song* (April 2021 – June 2021) (Wit Studio)
- We Never Learn (April 2019 – December 2019) (Studio Silver & Arvo Animation)
- Wind Breaker* (April 2024 – June 2025) (CloverWorks)
- World Conquest Zvezda Plot (January 2014 – March 2014) (A-1 Pictures)
- Working!!! (July 2015 – December 2015) (A-1 Pictures)
  - WWW.Working!! (October 2016 – December 2016) (A-1 Pictures)
- Your Lie in April* (October 2014 – March 2015) (A-1 Pictures)
- Yuuna and the Haunted Hot Springs (July 2018 – September 2018) (Xebec)

=== Video games ===
- Adabana Odd Tales
- Atri: My Dear Moments
- Fate/Grand Order
- Magia Record
- Witch on the Holy Night
- Tsukihime: A Piece of Blue Glass Moon

=== Music artists ===
- LiSA
- Mikunopolis in Los Angeles

== See also ==
- Crunchyroll, LLC, Sony's sister anime distribution company based in Coppell that is also operated by Aniplex
- List of anime distributed in the United States
- List of anime releases made concurrently in the United States and Japan
- Bang Zoom! Entertainment, recording production company in Burbank that provided the dubbing for Aniplex USA's licensed series
