= Sentai Studios =

American post-production studio

- Previous logo from 2009 to 2014, as Seraphim Digital
- Formerly: Industrial Smoke & Mirrors (1995–2005); ADV Studios (2005–2006); Amusement Park Media (2006–2009); Seraphim Digital (2009–2014)
- Type: Division
- Industry: ADR production, post-production, localization (translation and subtitling)
- Founded: 1995; 31 years ago
- Headquarters: Houston, Texas, U.S.
- Parent: Sentai Filmworks
- Divisions: Section23 Films; Anime Network

Sentai Studios is an American post-production studio of Sentai Filmworks, a subsidiary of AMC Networks located in Houston, Texas.

The studio was founded in 1995 as Industrial Smoke & Mirrors, the in-house studio of ADV Films. It was renamed ADV Studios in 2005 when it merged with ADV's secondary studio, the Austin-based Monster Island; and then in 2006, when ADV began offering its services to other companies, the studio was also called Amusement Park Media before it was sold off by A.D. Vision in 2008. It was then renamed Seraphim Digital before going into its current name in 2014.

Today, Sentai Studios is best known for producing English-language dubs of Japanese anime series and live-action Japanese films released by ADV, Sentai, Switchblade Pictures, and Maiden Japan. Other notable clients include Warner Bros., Sony Pictures, Microsoft, PBS, and Toei Animation. As of 2026, the majority produced by this studio can be found on Sentai's HIDIVE streaming service.

== Production list ==
=== Anime ===
==== TV and OVA anime ====
- 009-1 (ADV Films)
- 7 Seeds (Netflix/Sentai Filmworks)
- After the Rain (Sentai Filmworks)
- Air (ADV Films → Funimation/Crunchyroll)
- Akame ga Kill! (Sentai Filmworks)
- AKB0048 (Sentai Filmworks)
- Akiba Maid War (Sentai Filmworks)
- Amagi Brilliant Park (Sentai Filmworks)
- Amnesia (Sentai Filmworks)
- Angel Beats! (Sentai Filmworks → Aniplex of America)
- Another (Sentai Filmworks)
- Assassins Pride (Sentai Filmworks)
- Babylon (Sentai Filmworks)
- Bad Girl (Sentai Filmworks)
- Ballad of a Shinigami (Maiden Japan)
- BanG Dream! (Sentai Filmworks, season 2 only)
- Battle Girls: Time Paradox (Sentai Filmworks)
- Beheneko: The Elf-Girl's Cat is Secretly an S-Ranked Monster! (Sentai Filmworks)
- Betterman (Bandai Entertainment → Sentai Filmworks)
- Blade of the Immortal (Sentai Filmworks)
- Blade of the Phantom Master (ADV Films)
- Beyond the Boundary (Sentai Filmworks)
- Blue Drop (Sentai Filmworks)
- Bodacious Space Pirates (Sentai Filmworks)
- Broken Blade (Sentai Filmworks)
- Brynhildr in the Darkness (Sentai Filmworks)
- Btooom! (Sentai Filmworks)
- Call of the Night (Sentai Filmworks)
- Campione! (Sentai Filmworks)
- Canaan (Sentai Filmworks)
- Chained Soldier (Sentai Filmworks)
- Chidori RSC (Sentai Filmworks)
- Chivalry of a Failed Knight (Sentai Filmworks)
- Clannad (Sentai Filmworks)
- Clannad After Story (Sentai Filmworks)
- Coicent (Sentai Filmworks)
- Dark Gathering (Sentai Filmworks)
- Demon King Daimao (Sentai Filmworks)
- Devil May Cry: The Animated Series (ADV Films)
- Diabolik Lovers (Sentai Filmworks)
- Domestic Girlfriend (Sentai Filmworks)
- Dream Eater Merry (Sentai Filmworks)
- Dungeon People (Sentai Filmworks)
- Dusk Maiden of Amnesia (Sentai Filmworks)
- Ef: A Fairy Tale of the Two. (Sentai Filmworks)
- Elfen Lied (OVA: Sentai Filmworks)
- Five Numbers! (Sentai Filmworks)
- Farming Life in Another World (Sentai Filmworks)
- Food Wars!: Shokugeki no Soma (Sentai Filmworks/Crunchyroll)
- From the New World (Sentai Filmworks)
- Galactic Armored Fleet Majestic Prince (Sentai Filmworks)
- Gatchaman (Sentai Filmworks)
- Gate (Sentai Filmworks)
- Ghost Hound (Sentai Filmworks)
- Gintama (Sentai Filmworks → Funimation/Crunchyroll)
- Girls und Panzer (Sentai Filmworks)
- Golgo 13 (Sentai Filmworks)
- Guin Saga (Sentai Filmworks)
- Haikyu!! (Sentai Filmworks/Crunchyroll)
- Hakkenden: Eight Dogs of the East (Sentai Filmworks)
- Hakuōki (Sentai Filmworks)
- Hero Without a Class: Who Even Needs Skills?! (Sentai Filmworks)
- Heaven's Memo Pad (Sentai Filmworks)
- Helck (Sentai Filmworks)
- Highschool of the Dead (Sentai Filmworks)
- Hidamari Sketch (Sentai Filmworks)
- Himouto! Umaru-chan (Sentai Filmworks)
- Horizon in the Middle of Nowhere (Sentai Filmworks)
- How Clumsy you are, Miss Ueno (Sentai Filmworks)
- How I Attended an All-Guy's Mixer (Sentai Filmworks)
- I Parry Everything (Sentai Filmworks)
- I'm Quitting Heroing (Sentai Filmworks)
- ICE (Sentai Filmworks)
- Infinite Stratos (Sentai Filmworks)
- Innocent Venus (ADV Films)
- Intrigue in the Bakumatsu – Irohanihoheto (Sentai Filmworks)
- Inu x Boku SS (Sentai Filmworks)
- Iroduku: The World in Colors (Sentai Filmworks)
- Is It Wrong to Try to Pick Up Girls in a Dungeon? (Sentai Filmworks)
- Jellyfish Can't Swim in the Night (Sentai Filmworks)
- Jing: King of Bandits - Seventh Heaven (ADV Films)
- Kakegurui (Sentai Filmworks, home video rights)
- Kamisama Dolls (Sentai Filmworks)
- Kandagawa Jet Girls (Sentai Filmworks)
- Kanon (ADV Films → Funimation/Crunchyroll)
- Kiba (ADV Films/Upper Deck)
- Kids on the Slope (Sentai Filmworks)
- Kill Me Baby (Sentai Filmworks)
- Knights of the Zodiac: Saint Seiya (Toei Animation)
- K-On! (Bandai Entertainment → Sentai Filmworks, Season 1 production only, Season 2 post-production)
- Kokoro Connect (Sentai Filmworks)
- Kurau Phantom Memory (ADV Films)
- La storia della Arcana Famiglia (Sentai Filmworks)
- Land of the Lustrous (Sentai Filmworks)
- Lazarus (Warner Bros.)
- Legends of the Dark King (Sentai Filmworks)
- Level 1 Demon Lord and One Room Hero (Sentai Filmworks)
- Little Busters! (Sentai Filmworks)
- Loner Life in Another World (Sentai Filmworks)
- Log Horizon (Sentai Filmworks, Seasons 1 and 2 → Funimation/Crunchyroll)
- Loups=Garous (Sentai Filmworks)
- Love, Chunibyo & Other Delusions! (Sentai Filmworks)
- Love Flops (Sentai Filmworks)
- MM! (Sentai Filmworks)
- Made in Abyss (Sentai Filmworks)
- Magikano (ADV Films)
- Majikoi ~ Oh! Samurai Girls (Sentai Filmworks)
- Maria Holic (Sentai Filmworks)
- Mayo Chiki (Sentai Filmworks)
- Medaka Box (Sentai Filmworks)
- Mitsuboshi Colors (Sentai Filmworks)
- Monthly Girls' Nozaki-kun (Sentai Filmworks)
- Moonlight Mile (ADV Films)
- Mother of the Goddess' Dormitory (Sentai Filmworks)
- My Gift Lvl 9999 Unlimited Gacha: Backstabbed in a Backwater Dungeon, I'm Out For Revenge! (Sentai Filmworks)
- My Isekai Life (Sentai Filmworks)
- My Love Story!! (Sentai Filmworks)
- My Teen Romantic Comedy SNAFU (Sentai Filmworks)
- Mysterious Girlfriend X (Sentai Filmworks)
- Nakaimo - My Sister is Among Them! (Sentai Filmworks)
- NANA (Viz Media → Sentai Filmworks, post-production only)
- Needless (Sentai Filmworks)
- Neon Genesis Evangelion (ADV Films → GKIDS)
- Night Raid 1931 (Sentai Filmworks)
- Ninja Kamui (Adult Swim)
- No Game No Life (Sentai Filmworks)
- No. 6 (Sentai Filmworks)
- Nyan Koi! (Sentai Filmworks)
- Oshi no Ko (Sentai Filmworks)
- Parasyte (Sentai Filmworks)
- Penguindrum (Sentai Filmworks)
- Phi Brain: Puzzle of God (Sentai Filmworks)
- Place to Place (Sentai Filmworks)
- Planzet (Sentai Filmworks)
- Plus-Sized Elf (Sentai Filmworks)
- Princess Principal (Sentai Filmworks)
- Princess Resurrection (Sentai Filmworks)
- Problem Children are Coming from Another World, aren't they? (Sentai Filmworks)
- Project Blue Earth SOS (ADV Films)
- Pumpkin Scissors (ADV Films)
- Red Garden (ADV Films)
- Reincarnated as a Sword (Sentai Filmworks)
- Revue Starlight (Sentai Filmworks)
- Rick and Morty: The Anime (Williams Street)
- Rurouni Kenshin - New Kyoto Arc (Sentai Filmworks)
- Saiyuki Gaiden (Sentai Filmworks)
- Saiyuki Reload: Zeroin (Sentai Filmworks)
- Sakura Wars (ADV Films)
- Samurai Girls (Sentai Filmworks)
- Say I Love You (Sentai Filmworks)
- School-Live! (Sentai Filmworks)
- Scum's Wish (Sentai Filmworks)
- Shattered Angels (ADV Films)
- Shenmue: The Animation (Crunchyroll / Adult Swim)
- Shining Hearts: Shiawase no Pan (Sentai Filmworks)
- Shikizakura (Sentai Filmworks)
- Squid Girl (Media Blasters → Sentai Filmworks, Season 1 production only, Season 2 + OVAs post-production)
- Suicide Squad Isekai (Warner Bros.)
- Sword Oratoria (Sentai Filmworks)
- S · A: Special A (Sentai Filmworks)
- Tamako Market (Sentai Filmworks)
- Tears to Tiara (Sentai Filmworks)
- Teasing Master Takagi-san (season 3; Sentai Filmworks)
- The Ambition of Oda Nobuna (Sentai Filmworks)
- The Book of Bantorra (Sentai Filmworks)
- The Dangers in My Heart (Sentai Filmworks)
- The Demon Girl Next Door (Sentai Filmworks)
- The Eminence in Shadow (Sentai Filmworks)
- The Executioner and Her Way of Life (Sentai Filmworks)
- The Pet Girl of Sakurasou (Sentai Filmworks)
- The Vexations of a Shut-In Vampire Princess (Sentai Filmworks)
- The Wallflower (ADV Films)
- The World God Only Knows (Sentai Filmworks)
- Tokyo Magnitude 8.0 (Maiden Japan)
- Tokyo Majin (ADV Films)
- Tonari no Seki-kun: The Master of Killing Time (Sentai Filmworks)
- Towa no Quon (Sentai Filmworks)
- Tsuritama (Sentai Filmworks)
- Tsurune (Sentai Filmworks)
- UFO Ultramaiden Valkyrie (seasons 3-4; ADV Films)
- Un-Go (Sentai Filmworks)
- Upotte!! (Sentai Filmworks)
- Urusei Yatsura (2022) (Sentai Filmworks)
- Venus Versus Virus (ADV Films)
- Vermeil in Gold (Sentai Filmworks)
- Voices of a Distant Star (ADV Films)
- Wasteful Days of High School Girls (Sentai Filmworks)
- Welcome to the N.H.K. (ADV Films → Funimation/Crunchyroll)
- Why the Hell are You Here, Teacher!? (Sentai Filmworks)
- Xam'd: Lost Memories (Sentai Filmworks)
- Xenosaga: The Animation (ADV Films)
- Ya Boy Kongming! (Sentai Filmworks)
- Yuki Yuna Is a Hero (Pony Canyon USA → Sentai Filmworks, post-production only)

==== Feature films ====
- 5 Centimeters Per Second (ADV Films)
- Appleseed (Sentai Filmworks)
- Appleseed Ex Machina (Warner Bros.)
- Appleseed Alpha (Sony Pictures)
- Batman Ninja vs. Yakuza League (Warner Bros.)
- Beyond the Boundary: I'll Be Here (Sentai Filmworks)
- Children Who Chase Lost Voices (Sentai Filmworks)
- Clannad (Sentai Filmworks)
- Colorful (Sentai Filmworks)
- Galactic Armored Fleet Majestic Prince: Genetic Awakening (Sentai Filmworks)
- Gintama: The Movie (Sentai Filmworks)
- Girls und Panzer das Finale (Sentai Filmworks)
- Girls und Panzer der Film (Sentai Filmworks)
- Grave of the Fireflies (Sentai Filmworks)
- Halo Legends (Warner Bros.)
- Is It Wrong to Try to Pick Up Girls in a Dungeon?: Arrow of the Orion (Sentai Filmworks)
- Love, Chunibyo & Other Delusions! Take on Me (Sentai Filmworks)
- Made in Abyss: Dawn of the Deep Soul (Sentai Filmworks)
- Made in Abyss: Journey's Dawn (Sentai Filmworks)
- Made in Abyss: Wandering Twilight (Sentai Filmworks)
- Mardock Scramble (Sentai Filmworks)
- No Game No Life: Zero (Sentai Filmworks)
- Princess Principal: Crown Handler (Sentai Filmworks)
- Space Pirate Captain Harlock (Toei Animation/Ketchup Entertainment)
- Starship Troopers: Invasion (Sony Pictures Home Entertainment)
- Tamako Love Story (Sentai Filmworks)
- Teasing Master Takagi-san: The Movie (Sentai Filmworks)
- The Garden of Words (Sentai Filmworks)

=== Live-action dubbing ===
- A Fist Full of Fuku (Switchblade Pictures)
- Big Bad Mama-san (Switchblade Pictures)
- Ghost Train (ADV Films)
- Synesthesia (ADV Films)
- The Kunoichi: Ninja Girl (Sentai Filmworks)
