= List of Assassins Pride episodes =

- Cover of the first Blu-ray release of Assassins Pride, featuring the character Melida Angel
- No. of episodes: 12

Release
- Original network: AT-X, Tokyo MX, SUN, BS NTV
- Original release: October 10 – December 26, 2019

Assassins Pride is an anime series adapted from the light novel series, written by Kei Amagi and illustrated by Nino Ninomoto. Kazuya Aiura directed the series at EMT Squared with Deko Akao written the scripts, and Maho Yoshikawa designed the characters. It aired from October 10 to December 26, 2019, on AT-X, Tokyo MX, SUN, and BS NTV. The opening theme is "Share the light" performed by Run Girls, Run!, while the ending theme is "Time of Foreigners" (異人たちの時間, Ijin-tachi no Jikan) performed by Tomori Kusunoki. The series ran for 12 episodes. Sentai Filmworks has licensed the series and streamed it on Hidive and Crunchyroll. Hidive produced an English dub.

== Episode list ==
No.	English title (Note: English titles are taken from Sentai Filmworks.) / Japanese translated title (Note: English translated titles are taken from Crunchyroll.) Original Japanese title	Original release date
1	"Mercy of an Assassin"; Transliteration: "Ansatsusha no Jihi" (Japanese: 暗殺者の慈悲)	October 10, 2019
A mysterious man enters a house and clashes with a series of attackers, killing them all but their leader who escapes. He is informed of a new mission, which involves determining whether the noble daughter of the Angel family Melida Angel truly possesses mana under the guise of being her tutor. The Angel family, well-known for producing top-class Paladin-level children, refuses to be dishonored if Melida ends up being the product of an affair with a commoner and as a result has no mana, hoping to assassinate her if so. Under the false name of Kufa Vampir, the man puts on a kind persona which causes Melida to immediately taking a liking to him. Kufa notices despite the disdain received from her peers, teachers and grandfather, as well as her own jealousy towards her Paladin-class cousin Elise, Melida persists a strong and hardworking spirit, rigorously practicing her swordsmanship and attempting to practice independently slaughtering evil lycanthropes, creatures of the night lurk outside the final human city of Flandore her grandfather, Lord Mordrewd, lures in to pressure her into awakening her mana. Although Kufa concludes she is an illegitimate child and by his guild, White Night's order, has to kill her. Instead, he introduces her to risky method of awakening her mana, feeding the potion to her with a kiss. Melida collapses but awakes the next day with the newfound ability to use mana.
2	"When the Girl's World Changes"; Transliteration: "Shōjo no Sekai ga Kawaru Toki" (Japanese: 少女の世界が変わるとき)	October 17, 2019
Kufa warns Melida should anyone know about the potion, the both of them will be executed. As she has taken mana in this method, her class is not a Paladin but a Samurai, like him. Looking forward to the moment when she will be acknowledged after all her struggles, Kufa requests she keeps her awakening a secret until the academy's end-of-semester tournament exam. At the academy, they are approached by Elise and her own private tutor, Rosetti Pricket, a member of the powerful guild Crest Legion and a Maiden-class warrior famed for her skills. Rosetti, smitten with Kufa, attempts to make a move, but his rejection prompts her to vow Elise will defeat Melida during the tournament. With the tournament held in teams, Melida is accepted into one out of pity, and ends up against her nemesis and bully Nerva Martillo's team. Surprising everyone with her mana abilities and quick reflexes, Melida corners the Gladiator-class Nerva and manages to defeat her despite running out of mana halfway by copying one of Kufa's abilities, impressing him greatly. Nerva apologizes sincerely to Melida after the latter's win in the tournament, moving on to compete against Elise's team, only for Elise to win single-handedly.
3	"Going Beyond the Limit" / "Beyond the Critical Point"; Transliteration: "Rinkai Ten no Kanata ni" (Japanese: 臨界点の彼方に)	October 24, 2019
Melida asks Kufa out to the upcoming school festival Circlet Night, but he declines. Feeling apologetic for lashing out at Elise before when they used to be so close as children, Melida decides to wear a special dress they had promised to match together but is disheartened to see Elise forced to wear something fancier on her family's orders. She realizes they both have been suffering in loneliness all this while, determined by their respective classes. Ashamed of being unable to keep her promise, Elise runs away with Melida in pursuit. But they are kidnapped by lyncanthropes and brought to an abandoned museum where their leader, a half-lyncanthrope named William Gin and also the man Kufa failed to kill, awaits. Gin informs he was ordered to transfer Elise's mana to Melida and turn her into a Paladin. Although the two girls almost manage to escape, they are eventually cornered. Fortunately, they are saved by their tutors. Kufa and Gin begin a showdown, revealing Kufa's identity to be a half-vampire, the strongest kind of lyncanthrope. Kufa severely injures Gin, sparing him only to return to his superiors with a warning. Back at the festival, Kufa asks Melida for a dance and she asks him to stay be her side forever. Elsewhere, Kufa's guild are concerned he has gone rogue and orders a mage called Black Madia to investigate.
4	"Two Young Ladies Assemble at the Chained Castle"; Transliteration: "Kusari-jō ni Tsudou, Otome to Otome" (Japanese: 鎖城に集う、乙女と乙女)	October 31, 2019
In a flashback, Elise remembers Melida protecting her from a lancanthrope wolf while they were lost in the forest. With the new semester, the principal announces the annual tournament between St. Friedswiede and the St. d'Autriche Girls Academy called the Luna Lumiere Selection. Much to the shock of the staff and students, Melida and Elise are chosen, with Melida choosing Nerva and a girl named Shenfa Zwitogue to join her team. While resting from training, Melida also encounters a mysterious Mule la More from St. d'Autriche, who encourages her. Kufa catches a maid from Elise's household trying to leave, revealing she had rigged the name selection to sabotage the girls' relationship. However, Melida seeks her approval instead and challenges the maid if she wins the tournament, she will form a unit with Elise. Kufa finally encounters Black Madia, who asks him to bring a sample of Melida's blood for closer examination and to prove his loyalty to the guild. Kufa refuses and the two begin to fight, but he is outmatched by Black Madia, whose Clown-class lets her mimic the abilities of other classes, until Rosetti joins in. Meanwhile, Elise suggests losing to Melida on purpose so they can form a unit together.
5	"The Golden Princess and the Silver Princess"; Transliteration: "Kogane no Hime to, Hakugin no Hime" (Japanese: 黄金の姫と、白銀の姫)	November 7, 2019
Three days before the Luna Lumiere Selection tournament begins, Kufa and Rosetti asked the academy principal to suspend the event until they find Black Madia, but they are refused. At lunch, Melida appears to eat alone when Rosetti comes up to Elise and asks her about if something happened between them. Nerva and Shenfa sit next to Melida and begin to discuss a strategy the tournament. The night before it starts, Kufa asks Melida about her issues with Elise, and she reveals Elise's decision to lose on purpose. Kufa suggests to Melida to talk to her alone and sort it out as siblings. At the beginning of the tournament, Nerva and Shenfa fends off attacks from Elise's teammates, allowing Melida to fight Elise alone. Meanwhile, Kufa finds a suspicious girl alone at the top of a school tower observing the battle below. Thinking she is Black Madia, he attacks her, but is surprisingly fended off by her Diablo class. He then asks her name and apologizes when she reveals herself as Mule La More, a member of one of the three Knight-Duke houses. As Black Madia can only imitate the abilities of lower-ranked classes, it can't be her. Melida and Elise fight until Melida catches Elise by surprise and knocks her out of the fight, resigning herself from the tournament. Nerva approaches them and Melida realizes Nerva was an impostor with different mana and she reveals she's Black Madia in disguise. Kufa and Rosetti confront Black Madia and defeat her. Kufa transports her outside of the academy and gives her a letter to Father on Melida's growth. Later, Keira Espada from St. d'Autriche is revealed to have won the tournament. Melida confronts Elise about wanting to form a unit and she happily agrees. Kufa knows he's missing something as a non-mana wielder like the old maid cannot enter the glass palace to change the stained glass - unless someone helped her in.
6	"The Gray Witch"; Transliteration: "Haiiro no Majo" (Japanese: 灰色の魔女)	November 14, 2019
At night, Rosetti approaches Kufa about a possible rumor among the students. Meanwhile, Melida, Elise, Mule, and Salacha Schicksal sneak out and travel through a tunnel to meet the rest of their classmates in secret. Shenfa toasts a party to everyone from St. Friedeswiede and St. d'Autriche for a completed tournament. Afterwards, while everyone cheerfully enjoys the party, Mule tells them an old story about a married couple and whose marriage soured to the point where the husband killed his wife and cut out her heart. Salacha then chimes in and says the woman, now known as the "Gray Witch", still wanders the earth and cuts the hearts out of young girls, scaring Elise and Melida. Suddenly, the lights go out and a shadow of a woman with red mana stands in the doorway. Melida, thinking it is the girl from the story, asks if the shadow is the "Gray Witch", only for the woman to smirk. Terrified, Melida, Elise, Mule, and Salacha flee from the room as the witch begins to wreak havoc. They head back through the tunnel until they come across unknown sticky, pink blobs of goo covering them. They continue to run until they are blocked at the exit by the witch. They decide to fight their way out, but are easily defeated and turn to run away. They manage to find their way out and see Kufa out on watch duty, but are horrified when they believe his heart was cut out. Kufa brings them back to the dorm and explains how he found out about the secret party from Rosetti and decided to play along with her scheme of portraying the "Gray Witch". He lectures the girls for breaking curfew and to go back to their rooms, but they end up too exhausted from the ordeal and share a bed for the night.
7	"No Guidance Above nor Below"; Transliteration: "Ue mo Shita mo Hyō wa Naku" (Japanese: 上も下も標はなく)	November 21, 2019
Melida awakens from a nightmare to Kufa telling her to get ready for a school field trip to Shangarta, one of the only human settlements outside Flandore. As they get to the academy, Rosetti runs up and proposes to Kufa to take her as his fiance in order to trick her father, Marquis Blosum Pricket, who has already hand-picked someone for her. Kufa agrees, much to Melida's chagrin. Once Blossom arrives, he brings up the idea to perform the wedding ceremony in Shangarta, the destination of the field trip and Rosetti's hometown, but Rosetti says she's happy with her current "fiance". Blosum studies Kufa closely, and is reminded of a serial killer from Rosetti's youth who is supposedly dead, though Rosetti doesn't remember it. Concerned, Melida ditches class and runs to ask Kufa about this, but runs into Black Madia, now known as Laque. Melida begins hearing a voice in her head, but they're interrupted by a scream from down the hall and come across an unconscious student. Blosum uses a potion to determine the perpetrator is a male who uses blue-colored mana, causing many to suspect Kufa. Later, the students arrive in Shangarta, where Melida hears more voices and wonders off towards some suspicious plants. Blosum stops her and explains the area is home to many dangerous "mystery spots". Someone then informs Blosum about a sick resident, who has to be killed in order to stop the illness. Rosetti brings Kufa to a church where she apologizes for asking him to be her "fiance", but thanks him for going along with the idea. As Kufa returns to Melida's dorm, she is upset at him being so late and demands something in return. Kufa takes her out and shows her a mystery spot he found a long time ago. They arrive at a magnetic cave where they're able to float around the cavern, much to Melida's joy. At night, Melida has another nightmare with the strange voice, and is woken up by Elise who tells her of another attack by the blue-mana perpetrator and Kufa is nowhere to be found.
8	"The Last Testament of a Certain Skeleton"; Transliteration: "Aru Gaikotsu no Yuigon" (Japanese: ある骸骨の遺言)	November 28, 2019
Melida and Elise arrive at the scene to find all of Blosum's adopted children drained of life energy. Blossom suspects Kufa committed the crime and told the town's citizens to find him. Melida runs off in search of Kufa, but Laque stops her and agrees to help solve the mystery. In order to maintain a low profile, Laque disguises herself as a student and the duo wander around town asking the citizens for any knowledge regarding the "mystery spots". After cunningly getting information from a woman in a flower shop, Melida and Laque find "The Crooked House", an abandoned house which is rumored to be the most dangerous mystery spot. They discover a pathway leading underground and follow it, leading them to a dungeon which has been filled with the corpses of the townspeople who were killed for harboring the strange sickness. As Laque begins to suspect Blossom of experimenting on the townsfolk, Melida hears the voice in her head and runs off suspecting another incident is about to occur. She rushes to the church and finds Elise unconscious and Rosetti dead. The citizens head out to find Kufa while Blossom takes Rosetti's body himself. As Melida lays Elise down to rest, Shenfa runs in and tells Melida Blossom has been attacked and Rosetti's body taken, as well as the residents are coming for Melida due to her connection to Kufa. She escapes and runs to the mystery spot where Blossom warned about the plants and broke through a wall leading into a tunnel. She follows it and comes across an underground library. She picks up the files and reads them, discovering how Blossom has been tampering with lyncanthropes and humans with the "night gene-factor". She then hears same voice in her head and suddenly Rosetti appears with white hair and blue mana. The voice then orders Rosetti to attack, but Kufa appears and stops her. As the two clash, Kufa transforms into his vampire form, causing Rosetti to flee and Melida to gaze at him in horror.
9	"An Eternal Pact"; Transliteration: "Yūkyū no Keiyaku" (Japanese: 悠久の契約)	December 5, 2019
Melida attempts to approach Kufa, but he pins her down and says he will erase her memories of him back to the day they met. Melida kisses Kufa, saying no matter what, she will stand by his side. Kufa then reveals he is half lycanthrope to Melida and explains how he was one of Blosum's experimental children in Shangarta. He was a successful mixture of human and lyncanthrope, but when an enormous spider-like lyncanthrope named Naqua attacked the town, he and Father from the White Knights worked together to defeat it. However, Rosetti was injured, forcing Kufa to turn her into a vampire to save her life and freeze her memories so she forgot she was a vampire (and thus won't hunger for blood). He wanted her to be happy without the burden of knowing what she is before joining Father's guild. Kufa asks Melida to keep what she just heard a secret before explaining Naqua has somehow returned and teamed up with Blossom to get Rosetti a fiance and increase the number of mana users in Shangarta. Kufa says that he already has a plan and requires some assistance. Melida barges into the chapel where Rosetti is getting married and says her love for Kufa is stronger than Rosetti's, snapping the latter out of her daze. The two get into a fight, causing Naqua to reveal himself as the perpetrator of the attacks thus far. Naqua escapes with Rosetti giving chase, who remembers everything about her past. Kufa arrives and both he and Rosetti change into vampire form to engage in combat with Naqua. With the help of the academy students, they're able to defeat Naqua once and for all. Rosetti happily remembers her past, but Kufa freezes her memories again due to the pact he made with the guild. Kufa finds Blosum in a dark room with his wife Carmilla pinned to a wall, who is in the process of becoming a lancanthrope. To repay his debt to Blosum for raising him, Kufa gives Carmilla a drug to turn her back into a human. As the students return home, Blosum is revealed to have turned himself in, while Melida welcomes Elise back and teases Rosetti about her new relationship with Kufa.
10	"Labyrinth Library"; Transliteration: "Meikyū Toshokan" (Japanese: 迷宮図書館)	December 12, 2019
Due to their excelling academics and training, Melida and Elise are invited by the headmistress to participate in the upcoming Vibria Goat Librarian Certification Exam. Meanwhile, a secret gathering of nobles led by Salacha's brother, Serge Schicksal, have deduced Melida might be an illegitimate child and plan on testing this during the exam on Mule la Mor's proposal. On the day of the exam, Kufa is called by Melida's father, Felgus Angel, who wishes to take her back home following an incident where an unknown masked man appeared at the school and claimed to be her biological father, hoping to spread rumors. Kufa attempts to dissuade him, when they are notified that the exam is being targeted by the criminal Guild Grimfice. Elsewhere, the students attending the exam are attacked, separating Melida and Elise from the others. They then end up fighting a group of ghosts acting as the dungeon's guardians, but are saved by Salacha and Mule.
11	"Messengers of Death"; Transliteration: "Shinigami no Tsukai-tachi" (Japanese: 死神の使いたち)	December 19, 2019
Kufa reassures Rosetti that he will deal with Guild Grimfice targeting the students and tells her to stay behind to protect the other students. Mule explains to Melida and Elise about them taking the exam too and offers for them to join as a team. Afterwards, the group approaches a disheveled bookshelf that needs to be rearranged in the correct order. When they reach down to pick up a book, small imps appear as their foes. Melida defeats them and Mule tells Elise and Salacha to place the books back to the correct bookshelf. After the books are in place, they are given special books that indicate they passed the exam, but Salacha suddenly takes Melida's book away. Meanwhile, the headmistress attempts to regroup with the other students, but is attacked by Grimfice members and is injured. Kufa appears and defeats the enemies while one of the guild executives summons more ghosts. Mule then takes the book from Salacha reads out loud that Melida's class is Samurai, before attempting to escape the labyrinth. As Kufa begins to become surrounded by ghosts, Gin appears and defeats the remaining enemies, before revealing that Grimfice isn't after Melida, but the entire student body of the academy. Father suddenly appears, recruiting Gin to his services in exchange for the formula to turn lancanthropes back to humans. Father then charges Kufa with finding the missing girls and bring them back safely. Meanwhile, Melida catches Mule and demands an explanation, but is met with a spell and is surrounded by bright light.
12	"Pride of an Assassin-Instructor"; Transliteration: "Ansatsu-Kyōshi no Kyōji" (Japanese: 暗殺教師の矜持)	December 26, 2019
Melida awakens in a court room akin to the Queen of Hearts from Alice in Wonderland, which is run by Mule, Serge Schicksal, and the other noble families of Flandore as the jury. Serge accuses Melida of deceiving everyone by being an illegitimate child of the Angel family, causing the jury to stir and throw insults at her. She retorts that she is the heiress of the Angel family and will prove it by getting strong enough to join the Crest Legion. Serge accepts the challenge and invites Melida to fight Salacha to prove her worth. After initially getting cornered by Salacha's Dragoon class, Melida uses Kufa's training and feints falling off balance to catch Salacha off guard, defeating her. The jury begins to doubt their accusations and worry about the consequences of their actions, until Serge suddenly reveals a magical pen that transforms into a massive ink-like dragon. As the girls evacuate the nobles, Serge is revealed to be a member of Guild Grimfice in disguise, who also claimed to be Melida's biological father. As he attacks the girls, Kufa appears and fends off the attack, allowing he and Melida to work together to defeat the masked man. The man wakes up in the real world beside Serge, who laments their foiled plans and kills the man for failing. A few days later, the culprit was revealed to be a disgraced member of the Crest Legion. Felgus, Melida's father, arrives soon after to investigate the current status of the Legion, and later tells Melida that a distant relative of theirs was Samurai class. He decides Melida happened to be born Samurai instead of Paladin class but still acknowledges her as his daughter. Sometime later, Melida meets with Kufa and promises to be able to protect him someday, reinforcing his decision to be with her.
