= History of anime in the United States =

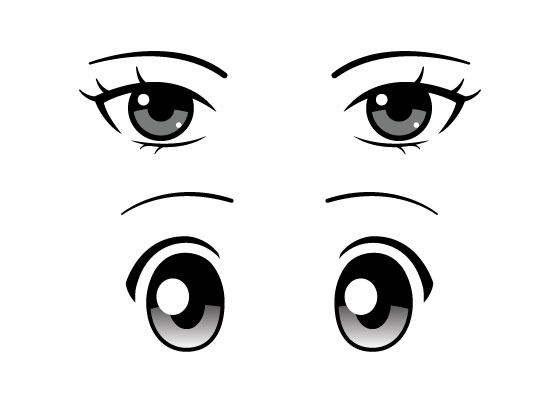
An example illustration of anime-style eyes.

Most agree that the history of anime in the United States began in 1961, when Shōnen Sarutobi Sasuke and The White Snake Enchantress, both produced by Toei Animation, became the first two anime films to receive documented releases in the country under the names Magic Boy and Panda and the Magic Serpent, respectively. Anime is a style of Japanese animation that attracts an enormous audience through its complex art, fluid movement, and emotional storytelling often involving superhuman elements. It has since found success with a growing audience in the region, with Astro Boy often being noted as the first anime to receive widespread syndication, especially in the United States. Although a handful of titles were translated before 1970, such as Speed Racer and 8th Man, anime did not achieve widespread popularity in the US until the 1990s. This period, commonly referred to as the "anime boom", is credited with cementing anime's relevance in popular culture outside Japan. Since then anime has achieved mainstream popularity in the United States, becoming a prominent part of the country's contemporary popular culture by influencing American fashion, music, video games, advertising, inspiring collaborations between anime franchises and major American brands and shaping the interests and consumption habits of viewers. Japanese animation has expanded far beyond niche fandoms, with franchises such as Pokémon, Dragon Ball Z, Demon Slayer: Kimetsu no Yaiba, and many others contributing to its widespread appeal among American audiences.

From its popularity in 1961 to the late 1980s, anime was introduced to American audiences through translated and English-dubbed versions. During the late 1980s to the late 1990s, the focus shifted toward localization, where anime was adapted to suit American cultural preferences and audience expectations. From the late 1990s to the present, anime has entered a new phase characterized by experimental collaborations between American and Japanese creators, blending creative styles and production techniques from both cultures.

While several anime series have originally been distributed by pirates and fansubbers in the past via bootleg releases from the late-1990s to mid-2000s, such practices have rapidly declined since the early-2010s due to the advent of legal streaming services such as Netflix, Prime Video, Hidive, and Crunchyroll, which simulcast new anime series often within a few hours of their domestic release.

== Pre-1980s ==
Astro Boy, created by Osamu Tezuka, was one of the first Japanese anime imported to U.S. TV and received wide attention in 1963 in Japan, and later that year in the U.S. Many anime titles would receive dubbed into English during the 1960s, often broadcast on syndication or sometimes as Saturday morning cartoons, due to the quickly growing popularity of animation on US television screens. In January 1966, Tetsujin 28-go, renamed Gigantor, debuted on New York's WPIX-TV. It had a mixed reception, with reviewers such as Variety magazine giving it a menacing review, with writers calling it a "loud, violent, tasteless and cheerless cartoon" which was "strictly in the retarded babysitter class". American International Television Productions released an English dub of Prince Planet around September 1966, however, it lacked popularity due to the growing popularity of color television and excessive violence. The same dubbing studio had also worked on The Amazing 3 in 1967, which was broadcast on KCOP-TV in Los Angeles.

Later in 1967, Speed Racer would be dubbed by Trans-Lux Corporation in syndication, becoming very popular, and would be one of the most popular anime in the U.S. until the 1990s. After the release of Marine Boy in 1969, there would be no new anime titles released in America until 1978.

Due to the extreme popularity of Star Wars in 1977, In 1978, Sandy Frank Entertainment released an Americanized version of Science Ninja Team Gatchaman, to capitalize on the space craze caused by Star Wars, retitling the show as Battle of the Planets. 85 of the original 105 episodes made the US revised version, along with cuts of elements of graphic violence and profanity. The show reached a high level of success, airing on over 100 network affiliates during after-school hours by 1979. That same year, Space Battleship Yamato would also receive an Americanized version, rebranded as Star Blazers.

== 1980s ==
Basic cable provided a frequent broadcast outlet for juvenile-targeted anime during the 1980s, in particular Nickelodeon and CBN Cable Network (now as Freeform).

In the early 1980s, CBN aired an English dub of the Christian-themed anime series Superbook and The Flying House, as well as the female-aimed drama series Honey Honey and an uncut, Honolulu-dubbed version of Go Nagai's super robot series Mazinger Z (aired as part of a Japan-focused, public-affairs program). In the late 1980s, after the station had been renamed as "The Family Channel", it would also air dubs of Wowser and Nippon Animation's World Masterpiece Theater version of Swiss Family Robinson.

Nickelodeon aired anime such as The Mysterious Cities of Gold and Belle and Sebastian, and anime also later formed a major component of the network's preschool-aimed Nick Jr. block, including Maple Town, Adventures of the Little Koala, Noozles, Maya the Bee, The Littl' Bits, and Grimm's Fairy Tale Classics. Pay-TV channels also aired anime occasionally: HBO broadcast numerous anime television series based on Western literature, including Gisaburō Sugii's Jack and the Beanstalk and the World Masterpiece Theater versions of Little Women and Tom Sawyer, and Osamu Tezuka's Unico features aired on the Disney Channel.

Majority of these titles aired in syndication were licensed and dubbed by Haim Saban's Saban Entertainment with Shuki Levy providing original dub scores. Saban continued to successfully license and localize Japanese media (such as Power Rangers and Digimon) well into the 90s and early 2000s.

In 1981, Roger Corman's New World Pictures oversaw the production of an English dub of the first Galaxy Express movie Bonjour Galaxy Express 999, shortened the name to Galaxy Express, distributed it theatrically. The dub changed some of the original Japanese names into more recognizable American names, like changing Tetsuro to Joey and Harlock to Warlock. Corman also edited out 30 minutes of footage, and Antonia Levi, the author of "Samurai from Outer Space", said that his dub was "highly edited and too damaged to watch". Faring similarly poorly was Manson International's 1984 edit of Hayao Miyazaki's Nausicaa of the Valley of the Wind, released theatrically by New World as Warriors of the Wind; a mainstay on HBO during the mid-to-late 1980s, this edited version is said to have so displeased Miyazaki-a renowned Japanese Filmmaker and co-founder of Studio Ghibli that he would insist that all future American releases of his work be unedited.

In 1983, Stern Electronics released a Dragon's Lair clone known as Cliff Hanger, which contained footage from the Lupin III films The Castle of Cagliostro and The Mystery of Mamo. As Cliff Hanger predated any proper Western release of Lupin media or Hayao Miyazaki films, and the popularization of anime in the West generally, it became notable for first exposing many Americans to anime.

In the mid-1980s, super robot and space opera anime were very popular. Series such as Voltron, The Transformers, and Robotech were successful in ratings and also commercial successes through selling merchandise. Mazinger Z fared less well, airing in syndication in 1985 in a heavily edited and dubbed version (not the Toei-commissioned dub previously broadcast on CBN) titled TranZor Z. Faring even worse was the first American release of Akira Toriyama's Dragon Ball in 1989. Harmony Gold produced a partial dub of the first five TV episodes and two movies (The Curse of the Blood Rubies and The Mystical Adventure), which were edited into an 80-minute film. The dubs were syndicated across America to independent television stations such as WPSG Philly 57 in Philadelphia, Pennsylvania, and WGPR-TV in Detroit, Michigan, but failed to find an audience.

Between 1988 and 1989, the OVA series Bubblegum Crisis was one of the earliest fansubs, with AnimEigo later acquiring a license to distribute and dub the series.

In 1988, Streamline Pictures became one of the first companies dedicated solely to anime dubs, most notably dubbed versions of Twilight of the Cockroaches and three more Miyazaki films: My Neighbor Totoro and Kiki's Delivery Service, both released initially as in-flight entertainment for Japan Airlines passengers traveling from North America to Japan, and Castle in the Sky. The Totoro dub would eventually be released theatrically and commercially in the United States in 1993, and all three movies would later be redubbed by the Walt Disney Company as part of the company's deal with Studio Ghibli.

Lensman: Secret of The Lens, based on the Lensman novels by E. E. Smith, was first dubbed by Harmony Gold in 1988, and re-dubbed by Streamline Pictures in 1990; some of the voice actors voiced characters in both dubs. The Harmony Gold dub used remastered music and some music tracks came from their past movies Robotech II: The Sentinels and Robotech The Movie: The Untold Story, while the Streamline Pictures dub used the original Japanese soundtrack.

In 1988, AnimEigo, following Streamline Pictures' lead, began distributing more anime with the slogan "Anime your way!" Their first dubbed anime was Metal Skin Panic MADOX-01; renamed MADOX-01 for the British release in 1995, it was only released on VHS in 1989, due to its content not being suitable for television or theatrical release. The company also dubbed the 4-episode OVA Vampire Princess Miyu that same year, which was later adapted into a 26-episode TV series by Tokyopop (and later by Maiden Japan in 1997).

In the mid- to late 1980s, anime films such as Akira, My Neighbor Totoro, Castle in the Sky, Kiki's Delivery Service, and MADOX-01 were dubbed by companies including MGM, what is now 20th Century Studios, New World Pictures, and AnimEigo. Even though these films were not very successful at the time, due in part to limited release, critical reception was positive, and Akira found a cult following. Most of these films received higher-quality dubs later on.

== 1990s ==
The 1990s was the period in which anime reached mainstream popularity in the U.S. market and the terms "anime" and "manga" became commonly known, replacing "Japanimation". Companies such as Funimation Productions, Bandai Entertainment, 4Kids Entertainment, Central Park Media, Media Blasters, Saban Entertainment, Viz Media, Pioneer LDC, and ADV Films began licensing anime in the United States.

Dragon Warrior, an adaption of the video game series, aired in 1989 in Japan; in 1990, it was broadcast in the US by Saban. The show was unsuccessful in the US and was not released on home video. Saban later dubbed and adapted the 1990 anime Kyatto Ninden Teyandee as Samurai Pizza Cats and aired it in syndication in 1996. In 2002, Saban's rights to the show expired, after which Discotek Media obtained the rights (which it still owns currently).

Viz Media, which was already successful with its manga translation of Rumiko Takahashi's Ranma ½, bought the rights to the anime and released it via direct-to-video starting in 1993. Ranma ½ enjoyed success in the VHS market, being the first anime title in the 1990s to have this level of success, and was one of the first titles to be recognized as an "anime". Viz also began publishing a magazine called Animerica in the 1990s, which featured manga as well as articles on Japanese culture, aesthetic, manga, anime, and video games; this helped spread the otaku subculture to Americans. Fansubs were also popular during this period.

In 1995, the original Dragon Ball, now assisted by Funimation and other collaborators, finally managed to air to an American audience for one season in early morning syndication. The show was cancelled after one season due to low ratings.

Anime saw greater success among American audiences when DiC (then owned by Disney) and Funimation (via Saban Entertainment and Canada-based Ocean Studios) licensed Sailor Moon (1995) and Dragon Ball Z (1996) respectively, and both were televised in the U.S. through early morning syndication. Since the two anime were very successful internationally, they were purchased to capitalize on the success of Japan-influenced superhero shows such as Fox Kids' Mighty Morphin Power Rangers (the popular Americanized version of the tokusatsu series Super Sentai) and Teenage Mutant Ninja Turtles.

In Summer 1998, Cartoon Network, which had an action-themed evening block named Toonami, began airing Sailor Moon and Dragon Ball Z. Both became overpoweringly successful with younger audiences (due to being aired in the evening hours which children were home). As a result, both series were revived, receiving new dubs with significantly less editing amid the recent inception of the TV Parental Guidelines (both were rated TV-Y7-FV). Voltron, Robotech and Ronin Warriors also enjoyed renewed success on Toonami. Toonami would continue to air anime and is credited with beginning the anime boom in the United States in the late 1990s and early 2000s.

In 1996, one of the most influential and controversial popular series was Neon Genesis Evangelion. It was released uncut on VHS by ADV Films, and Manga Entertainment released the films End of Evangelion and Evangelion: Death and Rebirth in the U.S. in 2002. Evangelion grew to have a large fanbase in the United States.

The American anime market peaked in 1998 after the production of multiple popular anime. In 1998, Pokémon was introduced to America because of The WB (now as CW), becoming a commercial success through its merchandising (trading cards, VHS, toys, video games, etc.). Digimon was introduced in 1999; although it was a success, it did not reach the same level of popularity as Pokémon.

Throughout the 1990s, Syfy (formerly Sci-Fi Channel) also aired many experimental, avant-garde, action, horror, and sci-fi anime films and series during the late night and early morning hours until their removal from programming in 2011. It aired films including Ghost in the Shell, Ninja Scroll, Akira, Street Fighter II: The Animated Movie, and Urusei Yatsura 2: Beautiful Dreamer, and series such as Casshan: Robot Hunter, Record of Lodoss War, Iria: Zeiram the Animation, and Fist of the North Star. In Northern California, KTEH-TV in San Jose became well known locally for being one of the few PBS outlets to air anime, in both dubbed and subtitled versions.

In 1999, Disney's Miramax released the anime film Princess Mononoke in the U.S. theatrically. Although it was not a great success at the box office, performing much better on DVD releases, it began the relationship between Disney and Studio Ghibli to distribute the latter's films in the U.S.

== 2000s ==
In the 2000s, even after the popular series Dragon Ball Z and Sailor Moon ended their runs, Toonami still continued to air popular anime such as Mobile Suit Gundam Wing (which is credited for single-handedly popularizing the Gundam franchise in some Western countries), Dragon Ball GT, Rurouni Kenshin, YuYu Hakusho, .hack, Cardcaptors, Tenchi Muyo!, Tenchi Universe (and Tenchi in Tokyo), The 08th MS Team, One Piece, Mobile Suit Gundam SEED, SD Gundam, Cyborg 009, IGPX, Bobobo-bo Bo-bobo, Outlaw Star, Hamtaro, and Naruto. Naruto was very successful on Toonami and remains one of the most popular anime titles in the U.S. In 2008, Toonami was discontinued and anime began airing exclusively on Adult Swim, the late-night counterpart to Cartoon Network.

When Adult Swim began airing on Cartoon Network in 2001, its first anime title aired was Cowboy Bebop. Cowboy Bebop was very successful and remains the longest aired anime series on Adult Swim. Adult Swim also aired series including uncut episodes of Fullmetal Alchemist, Inuyasha, Samurai Champloo, Death Note, Durarara!!, FLCL, Neon Genesis Evangelion, Case Closed, Lupin III, Code Geass, Bleach, Shin Chan, and Trigun. Adult Swim mostly airs anime under the title "Action", even though Shin Chan and Super Milk Chan are comedies. Adult Swim became so successful over the years that Turner Broadcasting split it from Cartoon Network; it is now ranked as an independent network.

Due to the popularity of Dragon Ball Z, Funimation would continue to dominate anime distribution in the United States and continued licensing several popular titles such as Fruits Basket, Black Cat, Ouran High School Host Club, Kodocha, Fullmetal Alchemist, and Tsubasa: Reservoir Chronicle, and launched its own Funimation Channel to exclusively air most of its titles. Funimation would also save rights to titles from defunct licensors, such as with ADV Films (which closed in 2008) and Geneon (which closed in 2007).

After the success of Pokémon in the late 1990s, 4Kids Entertainment continued to license anime titles targeted towards children, such as the Yu-Gi-Oh! franchise, Sonic X, Magical DoReMi, Mew Mew Power, Shaman King, Kirby: Right Back at Ya!, Dinosaur King, and Ultimate Muscle. However, 4Kids was met with much controversy for its heavy editing and "Americanization" of content, particularly Yu-Gi-Oh! and One Piece.

In 2002, Spirited Away was released through Disney theatrically, becoming the first anime film to be nominated for and win an Oscar-American Academy Award. Anime grossed $4.8 billion in 2003 and dropped to $2.7 billion due to a lack of high-quality anime. Despite this downturn, there have been collaborations between Japanese and American production companies, such as the Los Angeles Fan Expo, which have played a significant role in expanding anime's reach which has attracted hundreds of thousands of anime fans.

== 2010s ==
In 2010, Dragon Ball Z Kai premiered on Nicktoons (sister channel of the first kids' network) and became a hit success for the network. Nicktoons also aired the original Dragon Ball Z films and Dragon Ball GT. Starting in March 2013, Yu-Gi-Oh! and one of its continuing series, Yu-Gi-Oh! Zexal, began to air on the network. Digimon Adventure and Digimon Adventure 02 also started to air on Nicktoons starting in June 2013, and one of its continuing series, Digimon Fusion, moved to the network from Nickelodeon on October 13, 2013, after three episodes, mostly due to Nickelodeon's failed attempt at marketing the anime before it premiered on September 7.

Section23, Bandai, Viz, TV Tokyo, and Funimation have tried to limit these efforts by sending cease and desist letters or blocking content on many sites. The production of English dubs of anime has decreased in general, and many distributors, such as Sentai Filmworks, Aniplex of America, and NIS America, are switching to the subtitle-only market.

In 2012, Bandai folded its Bandai Entertainment anime licensing department in the United States. Eventually, their Sunrise studio made deals with Funimation and Sentai Filmworks to license and republish Sunrise titles formerly licensed by Bandai Entertainment. In 2012, 4Kids Entertainment filed for bankruptcy protection and sold the rights to the Yu-Gi-Oh! franchise back to Konami, with the remaining licenses going to Saban Brands.

In early 2012, Fullmetal Alchemist: The Sacred Star of Milos was released in over 100 theaters throughout North America. The Secret World of Arrietty was released theatrically in 2012, and was only a moderate box office success in the United States, despite being one of the highest-grossing films in the U.S. in 2012 (and #50 worldwide).

In 2012, due to popular requests on Twitter, Reddit, and Facebook, the Toonami block was revived and began airing on Adult Swim, replacing Adult Swim Action. Similar to Toonami's prior Midnight Run block, it is now targeted towards a young adult demographic with little to no editing of content. On May 16, 2014, Viz Media acquired the license for the original Sailor Moon series (formerly owned by DiC (now part of WildBrain) and Cloverway Inc. in the 1990s and early 2000s) and the new 2014 anime series, Pretty Guardian Sailor Moon: Crystal, which it premiered on July 5. In May 2014, The Walt Disney Company acquired the broadcasting rights for the 2005 Doraemon series and began airing it on Disney XD two months later, marking the first-ever release of the Doraemon franchise in the United States after not airing many years later because of Turner's failure.

In December 2015, the Funimation Channel was replaced by Toku, after Funimation finished its association with Olympusat, being the only 24-hour TV channel dedicated to broadcasting anime series and films, as well as live-action Asian films. Another major platform responsible for distributing anime content online is Crunchyroll. For some popular anime shows, Crunchyroll offers English-subtitled versions within about an hour after their Japanese broadcast. In 2010, the site streamed seven newly released series along with seven ongoing ones.

== 2020s ==
During the COVID-19 pandemic, many anime works were either canceled or delayed. Despite this, anime consumption and appreciation in the United States has grown tremendously in the 2020s. According to the Japanese Box Office, in the 2020s, Anime outperformed non-anime films in gross profit. This is largely due to the nationwide lockdown during the pandemic, and popularity of anime edits and fan discourse on the social media app TikTok. This exposed a whole new wave of American fans to Japanese anime, namely My Hero Academia, Death Note, Hunter x Hunter, Attack on Titan, Jujutsu Kaisen and Haikyu!!. This newfound interest and demand for anime content has only increased among audiences. The anime market around the world was valued at $21.2 billion in 2022, with estimates of growth going up to $21.6 billion in 2028. The anime industry is continually expanding, embracing broader demographics and diverse creative genres. Anime is expected to expand at a compound annual growth rate (CAGR) of 14.9% from 2023 to 2030.

In the years since 2020, there have been several American theatrical releases of new Japanese animated films and even limited-time re-releases of popular films such as The End of Evangelion, My Hero Academia: You're Next, Chainsaw Man – The Movie: Reze Arc, Demon Slayer: Kimetsu no Yaiba – The Movie: Infinity Castle, and a variety of Ghibli films screened nationwide during Ghiblifest.

Netflix has also adapted an expanding number of live-action series based on Japanese anime IP. Their most successful adaptions thus far have been One Piece (2023–present) and Alice in Borderland (2020–2025).

== See also ==
- History of animation
- History of comics
- History of manga
- List of years in anime
- History of anime
