= David Williams (producer) =

American film producer

David L. Williams, sometimes referred to by his initials, DLW, is an American producer and ADR director (and, occasionally, a voice actor) that has been with ADV Films from the beginning when his living room was used as a production facility for their first show, Devil Hunter Yohko. He left ADV in March 2008 and has since worked at Sentai Filmworks and Seraphim Digital.

David regularly makes appearances at anime conventions as a representative of ADV. When asked questions about future productions, he often replies with his trademark phrase, "I can neither confirm nor deny".

== Production credits ==
=== ADR Director ===
- All Purpose Cultural Catgirl Nuku Nuku (co-directed with Janice Williams)
- Angelic Layer
- Aquarian Age: Sign for Evolution
- Clannad (co-directed with Janice Williams)
- Clannad After Story (co-directed with Janice Williams)
- D.N.Angel
- Dirty Pair (OVAs only)
- Dirty Pair: Project Eden
- Najica Blitz Tactics
- Pretear
- The Super Dimension Fortress Macross (co-directed with Matt Greenfield and Jin Ho Chung)
- Ushio & Tora (OVA)
