= Love Flops =

Japanese anime television series

- Key visual
- 恋愛フロップス; Ren'ai Furoppusu
- Genre: Harem; Romantic comedy; Science fiction
- Created by: Love Flops Project
- Written by: Ryō Yasumoto
- Directed by: Nobuyoshi Nagayama
- Voices of: Ryōta Ōsaka; Ayana Taketatsu; Hisako Kanemoto; Marika Kōno; Miku Itō; Rie Takahashi
- Music by: Kenichiro Suehiro
- Opening theme: "Love? Reason why!!" by Konomi Suzuki
- Ending theme: "Flop Around" by Miku Itō, Ayana Taketatsu, Rie Takahashi, Hisako Kanemoto, & Marika Kōno (1–6); "Flop Around" (instrumental) by Hiroaki Suzuki (7); "lost in the white" by Miku Itō (8–12)
- Country of origin: Japan
- Original language: Japanese
- No. of seasons: 1
- No. of episodes: 12

Production
- Executive producers: Asuka Yamazaki; Daijō Kudō; Hirotaka Kaneko; Jirō Hirosawa; Katsuya Tasaki; Kei Fukushima; Satoshi Kobayashi; Shingo Kunieda
- Producers: Shō Tanaka; Tomoyuki Oowada; Jōtarō Ishigami; Toyokazu Nakahigashi; Akihiro Sotokawa; Takahiro Hibi; Shuka Nishimae; Yuuka Katō; Takuji Wada
- Cinematography: Kōji Hayashi
- Animator: Passione
- Editors: Ayako Tan; Nami Niinuma
- Running time: 24 minutes
- Production company: Ren'ai Flops Production Committee

Original release
- Network: AT-X, (Note: Uncensored airings) Tokyo MX, KBS Kyoto, SUN, BS11, TVA
- Release: October 12 – December 28, 2022

Related
- Manga
- Written by: Love Flops Project
- Illustrated by: Ryūdai Ishizaka
- Published by: Hakusensha
- Magazine: Young Animal
- Original run: June 24, 2022 – July 28, 2023
- Volumes: 3

Love Flops (Japanese: 恋愛フロップス, Hepburn: Ren'ai Furoppusu) is an original Japanese anime television series produced by Kadokawa Corporation, animated by Passione, and directed by Nobuyoshi Nagayama. It follows a high school student whose life is turned upside down after he has a fateful encounter with five girls on his way to school.

The series aired from October to December 2022 on AT-X and other networks. Sentai Filmworks the licensed the series for English-speaking regions, streaming it on its Hidive platform with an English dub that premiered in November 2023.

A manga adaptation by Ryūdai Ishizaka was serialized in Hakusensha's Young Animal magazine from June 2022 to July 2023.

== Plot ==
One day before going to school, Asahi Kashiwagi watches a fortune telling program on television. Every prediction turns out to be true when he encounters five girls along the way, with each one eventually giving him a love confession. Asahi now has to find a way to deal with this unexpected situation.

== Characters ==
=== Main characters ===
Asahi Kashiwagi (柏樹 朝, Kashiwagi Asahi)
Voiced by: Ryōta Ōsaka, Mayu Minami (young) (Japanese); Jeremy Gee (English)
A high school boy who receives five love confessions on a first day of school after seeing a fortune telling program on television. It is later revealed that he was recruited for a virtual reality program to experience a computer generated world with simulated characters.
Aoi Izumisawa (和泉沢 愛生, Izumisawa Aoi)
Voiced by: Miku Itō (Japanese); Natalie Rial (English)
A Japanese student and one of Asahi's classmates. She wears glasses, and has a bright and cheerful personality. She is also a talented cook for her housemates. It is later revealed that she is actually a simulated character and that she was the first among the artificial intelligence girls to be created. Because of this, she is said to be the most similar to the AI girls' base, Asahi's childhood friend, Ai Izawa.
Amelia Irving (アメリア・アーヴィング, Ameria Āvingu)
Voiced by: Ayana Taketatsu (Japanese); Brittney Karbowski (English)
An American student and one of Asahi's classmates. She is always seen wearing headphones with cat ears. She wants to be good at Japanese by studying kanji. It is later revealed that she is actually a simulated character. Later in the series, she is a magical girl.
Irina Ilyukhina (Note: Bulgarian: Ирина Илюхина; Ilja Iljuhina) (イリーナ・イリューヒナ, Irīna Iryūhina)
Voiced by: Rie Takahashi (Japanese); Juliet Simmons (English)
A shy Bulgarian student and one of Asahi's classmates. She is actually a cross-dressing girl who has been forced to live like a boy under the name Ilya Ilyukhin (Note: Bulgarian: Илья Илюхин; Ilja Iljuhin) (イリヤ・イリューヒン, Iriya Iryūhin) by her late father. It is later revealed that she is actually a simulated character. She is also a magical girl.
Bai Mongfa (白 夢華, Bai Monfa)
Voiced by: Hisako Kanemoto (Japanese); Maggie Flecknoe (English)
The class' teacher who comes from China. Because she is still young, her relationship with her students is more like that of an older sister. She has a clumsy personality, particularly at home. She is a former tai chi assassin of an underground organization and has the codename "Bloody Tiger". It is later revealed that she is actually a simulated character.
Karin Istel (カリン・イステル, Karin Isuteru)
Voiced by: Marika Kōno (Japanese); Cate Smyth (English)
A self-conscious German student and one of Asahi's classmates. She is also active as a model whose billboards are a common sight in Tokyo. She is also a magical girl, becoming one after an encounter with an alien familiar. It is later revealed that she is actually a simulated character.

=== Supporting characters ===
Yoshio Ijūin (伊集院 好雄, Ijūin Yoshio)
Voiced by: Jun Fukuyama (Japanese); Blake Shepard (English)
Asahi's classmate and self-proclaimed best friend. He comes from a rich family which owns a beach house. It is later revealed that he is actually a simulated character and an alter-ego of scientist Yoshino Feynman.
Loverin (ラブリン, Raburin)
Voiced by: Shiori Izawa (Japanese); Kira Vincent-Davis (English)
A rabbit-shaped alarm clock which says things to Asahi and the others. She has a screen that can display both time and other information.
Ai Izawa (井澤 愛, Izawa Ai)
Voiced by: Miku Itō (Japanese); Natalie Rial (English)
Asahi's childhood friend. She died from a brain tumor two years prior to Asahi entering the VR program, but her consciousness formed the basis of a new AI model. Additionally, her memories were implanted into the five simulated characters created by the international VR companies.
Yoshino Feynman (好乃・ファインマン, Yoshino Fainman)
Voiced by: Yukiyo Fujii (Japanese); Molly Searcy (English)
A strange scientist who works on AI in a technological company called Cavenish. She informs Asahi that the girls he was living with were all part of a VR simulation. She is also investigating what led the simulation to prematurely end. She appears in the simulated world in the form of Yoshio Ijūin.

== Media ==
=== Manga ===
A manga adaptation illustrated by Ryūdai Ishizaka was serialized in Hakusensha's Young Animal magazine from June 24, 2022, to July 28, 2023. The first tankōbon volume was released on September 29, 2022.

==== Volumes ====
No.	Japanese release date	Japanese ISBN
1	September 29, 2022	978-4-592-16616-0
2	December 27, 2022	978-4-592-16617-7
3	September 29, 2023	978-4-592-16618-4

=== Anime ===
The original anime television series produced by Kadokawa Corporation and animated by Passione was announced on March 25, 2022. The series was directed by Nobuyoshi Nagayama, with assistant direction by Midori Yui and Fujiaki Asari, scripts written by Ryō Yasumoto, character designs handled by Kazuyuki Ueda, who also serves as chief animation director, and music composed by Kenichiro Suehiro. It aired from October 12 to December 28, 2022, on AT-X and other networks. Konomi Suzuki performed the opening theme song "Love? Reason why!!", while Miku Itō, Ayana Taketatsu, Rie Takahashi, Hisako Kanemoto, and Marika Kōno performed the first ending theme song "Flop Around". Itō performed the second ending theme song "Lost in the white" and the insert song for episode 12, "With You". Kadokawa collected its episodes on two Blu-ray box sets, released on January 25 and March 24, 2023.

In North America, British Isles, and Australia, Sentai Filmworks has licensed the series, who streamed it on Hidive. An English dub produced by Sentai Studios, under ADR director John Swasey, premiered on November 28, 2023. It was released on a Blu-ray set on January 16, 2024.

==== Episodes ====
No.	Title (Note: All English titles are taken from Hidive.)	Directed by (Note: Information is taken from the ending credits of each episode.)	Storyboarded by	Original release date
1	"Don't Get So Grabby, You Clumsy Oaf!"; Transliteration: "Gattsuku na yo, Hetakuso ka yo" (Japanese: ガッツくなよ、ヘタクソかよ)	Asari Fujiaki & Yui Midori	Nobuyoshi Nagayama	October 12, 2022
2	"I Figure We All Have Our Own Pleasures and Predilections"; Transliteration: "Shumi toka Seiheki toka Hito Sorezore da to Omoushi" (Japanese: 趣味とか性癖とか人それぞれだと思うし)	Mika Komatsu	Nobuyoshi Nagayama	October 19, 2022
3	"No! Not There! Not Like That!"; Transliteration: "Dame! Sonna Tokoro, Sonna Fūni" (Japanese: ダメ！そんなところ、そんな風に)	Hiroki Moritomo	Naruyo Takahashi	October 26, 2022
4	"Wow! It's Huge!"; Transliteration: "Sugēn da yo, Dekēn da!" (Japanese: すげーんだよ、でけーんだ！)	Daiki Takemoto	Takeo Takahashi	November 2, 2022
5	"A Bone-Shakingly Fine Woman"; Transliteration: "Dōburui Suru Yōna Ii Onna da ze" (Japanese: 胴震いするようなイイ女だぜ)	Hito Tadano	Ikuo Morimoto	November 9, 2022
6	"No Balls! N-No Dick Either..."; Transliteration: "Tama ga nē...!! Chi... Chin mo..." (Japanese: タマがねえ…！！チ…チンも…)	Hiroki Moritomo	Ikuo Morimoto	November 16, 2022
7	"I'll Charge a Snooze Fee"; Transliteration: "Enchō Ryōkin Toraren zo" (Japanese: 延長料金とられんぞ)	Yūta Kida	Nobuyoshi Nagayama	November 23, 2022
8	"People Don't Like It If You're Early, But They Hate It If You're Late Too"; Transliteration: "Hayai no mo Kirawareru Kedo, Ososugiru no mo Iyagararen zo" (Japanese: 早いのも嫌われるけど、遅過ぎるのも嫌がられんぞ)	Tarō Kubo	Tatsuya Ishiguro	November 30, 2022
9	"Your Mom's Inviting You For Some Baby Roleplay"; Transliteration: "Mama kara Akachan Purei no Osasoi da zo" (Japanese: ママから赤ちゃんプレイのお誘いだぞ)	Tarō Kubo	Hiroaki Yoshikawa	December 7, 2022
10	"Yup, It's Risky to Go in Raw, Rubber"; Transliteration: "Yappari Nama wa Kikengomu" (Japanese: やっぱりナマはキケンゴム)	Satoshi Saga	Hiroaki Yoshikawa	December 14, 2022
11	"I'm Glad I Got to Meet You"; Transliteration: "Anata ni Aete Yokatta" (Japanese: あなたに会えてよかった)	Daiki Takemoto	Shinji Itadaki	December 21, 2022
12	"Could You At Least Put Some Undies On?"; Transliteration: "Semete Pantsu Kurai Haitara Dōdai" (Japanese: せめてパンツくらいはいたらどうだい)	Fujiaki Asari	Ikuo Morimoto	December 28, 2022

== Reception ==
=== Previews ===
The series' first episode received negative reviews from Anime News Network's staff during the Fall 2022 season previews. James Beckett critiqued that the series failed to replicate the tightrope concept of "nonsensical shenanigans" and sincere relationships that Wet Hot American Summer captured, saying the premise had "no clever commentary on those hacky clichés, no subversion of expectations, nor anything else of merit or interest". Richard Eisenbeis felt the series did not go further with its deconstruction of the lucky pervert trope in romantic comedy anime and had a "compelling mystery" regarding Asahi's surroundings being a dream or virtual reality, but concluded that "it's not enough to bring me back for week two—and neither is anything else in the show for that matter." Nicholas Dupree was put off by the "escalation of bad taste" following the episode's elongated take on the first two minutes of A Sister's All You Need's opening episode, saying "if somebody wanted to make a parody of lazy dating sim games and the ridiculously contrived ways they deliver cheap fanservice of flat characters to an increasingly desensitized audience, it would certainly look like Love Flops."

=== Series ===
Julian Malerman, writing for THEM Anime Reviews, heavily panned the series for not fully committing to its "wildly trashy premise" and ecchi harem clichés in the first half, and failed to accomplish being a "genre subversion or satire" akin to Doki Doki Literature Club in the second half, calling it "a case study in misplaced writing priorities" that's recommended to "the morbidly curious and, preferably, thoroughly inebriated."

== See also ==
- Iwa-Kakeru! Climbing Girls, a manga series also illustrated by Ryūdai Ishizaka
