= Papillon Rose =

Japanese anime series

- Artwork for the DVD case front cover for the North American release by Maiden Japan. The character Tsubomi as Papillon Rose is shown at the top center, Anne as Papillon Lily left center and Shizuku as Papillon Margarette on the lower right.

パピヨンローゼ (Papiyon Rōze)
- Genre: Erotic comedy, parody
- Original video animation

Lingerie Soldier Papillon Rose: Tsubomi no Yume wa Yoru Hiraku
- Directed by: Shinji Tobita
- Produced by: Kouichirou Oohashi
- Written by: Shiji Tobita; Shoan Egashira
- Music by: KURi-ZiLL
- Studio: Studio Kelmadick
- Licensed by: NA: Maiden Japan
- Released: 2003
- Runtime: 24 minutes
- Anime television series

Papillon Rose: The New Season
- Directed by: Yasuhiro Matsumura
- Produced by: Shinichi Nagakubo; Yakki Tokashiki
- Written by: Kazuharu Sato
- Music by: Masaya Koike (4-Ever)
- Studio: Kelmadick
- Licensed by: NA: Maiden Japan
- Original network: TVQ, TVh, MX, TVA, NTV
- English network: NA: Anime Network
- Original run: February 9, 2006 – March 16, 2006
- Episodes: 6

Papillon Rose (パピヨンローゼ, Papiyon Rōze) is an anime series which parodies the magical girl genre, particularly Sailor Moon and Cutie Honey. A 24-minute OVA was released in 2003 followed by a six-episode TV series, broadcast in Japan in 2006. A DVD collection containing the OVA and TV series was released in North America in 2010. The origin of this anime series is different from most other anime series' as it is based on an Internet hoax rather than a previously existing manga series.

== History ==
Papillon Rose started out as a metafiction joke on what was claimed to be the website for a new anime project Lingerie Fighter Papillon Rose. The website posted pictures of characters (which were usually copied from scenes in Sailor Moon, with the artwork changed) and a lyrics to opening and ending theme songs. Demand grew due to people finding the page and assuming it was for an actual series. Subsequently, an episode guide for the (non-existent) first series and manga was also made available, as well as a set of CD-ROMs containing a 2-minute animated promotional clip, eight tracks (six BGM and two vocal songs), system voice clips for computers, a Papillon Rose mahjong game, and two screen savers. The CDs were only made available for Comiket, and were not distributed outside Japan. The project homepage was redesigned and fake manga illustrations and notes from the fictional author were added. Amateur voice actors and singers were also contacted online to provide sample character voice clips for a handful of the villains and heroines. A 25-episode ONA series was promised in 2001 along with the release of an animated teaser trailer. Nothing other than the trailers were ever released online or elsewhere. In January 2002, a second season concept was introduced, named Lingerie Soldier Papillon Rose R, aiming to be released as an artbook on Comiket. In April 2004, a movie finale concept was introduced as well, named Lingerie Soldier Papillon Rose G. Subsequently, all of the project websites were either taken down or replaced with a blank page with the former content removed. There is no evidence that any fan-submitted material was ever used for either the OVA episode or the TV series.

In the fall of 2014, a blog was opened featuring new artwork for what claimed to be a new version of the Papillon Rose series, a rebuild of the original idea as a film trilogy. A new website was opened a few days afterwards, advertising a Papillon Rose booth in the 2015 Comiket. A new doujinshi artbook was released together with two pencil boards, featuring new artwork for the characters and a similar storyline to the original incarnation of the web series.

== Lingerie Soldier Papillon Rose OVA 2003 ==
Lingerie Soldier Papillon Rose: Tsubomi's Dreams Blossom in the Night (ランジェリー戦士パピヨンローゼ つぼみの夢は夜開く, Ranjerii Senshi Papiyon Rōze: Tsubomi no Yume wa Yoru Hiraku) (Note: The subtitle refers to the episode's title, presented as the first of a hypothetical longer series, keeping in line with Papillon Rose's origin as a hoax.) was released as a single 24-minute OVA episode. This one-episode OVA was distributed on VHS and DVD formats by Pink company and Office F&O in 2003.

This OVA episode is included in the 2010 North American DVD release with the six-episode Papillon Rose: The New Season TV series.

== Papillon Rose: The New Season TV series (2006) ==
A six-episode TV series titled Papillon Rose: The New Season was broadcast in Japan in 2006. The TV series images and dialog are toned down considerably from the 2003 OVA. The series takes place a year after the events of the OVA, but presented as a sequel series to a weekly program continuing its story into a new season.

=== Plot summary ===
After the events of Lingerie Soldier Papillon Rose, the girls have no recollection of their secret identities and can no longer transform. Tsubomi is approached by Rama, whom, at first, she does not understand. The Earth, specifically the otaku district of Akiba, is under attack by a trio of powerful alien women along with their minions. The explosions around Tsubomi restore her memories and she reassembles the rest of the Papillon team to defend the town. The Papillon team is reassembled and the enemies are won over by the team's magical-girl powers and their "charms".

== North American releases ==
In March 2010, Section23 Films announced plans to release the six-episode TV series and the OVA on DVD for North America on behalf of Maiden Japan. The collection was released on June 8, 2010, on a single DVD titled "Papillon Rose." This title was the first licensed by Maiden Japan for release in North America. It is in the Japanese language with English subtitles.

In January 2014 the six episodes of the TV series and the single OVA episode were posted on the Anime Network website for online streaming.

=== Reception ===
The North American DVD release was reviewed by Chris Beveridge on the popular media blog Mania.com and given an overall grade of B. He summarizes his review:

″Papillon Rose serves up just the right kind of parody of the Sailor Moon and magical girl world with this release. I do admittedly prefer the OVA more than the TV series because it's concise and has a much dirtier mindset to it. The TV series tones things down for obvious reason but it still has a good deal of fun and manages to get dirty in its own way. This was the kind of show where its reputation certainly preceded [sic] it and you always fear it may not live up to expectations. With the broadcast version of the TV series here, that's a definitely downside. But for what we do get, it's a lot of fun and a good way to spend an evening watching pretty anime girls doling out justice in a slight smutty way with smiles on their faces. It's a title for discerning tastes, to say the least.″
