= Anime Strike =

Defunct American streaming channel

- Company type: Division
- Website type: Video on demand
- Headquarters: {{{location_country}}}
- Area served: United States
- Industry: Internet
- Parent: Amazon.com
- Website: amazon.com/animestrike
- Registration: Required
- Launched: January 12, 2017; 9 years ago
- Current status: Defunct

Anime Strike was a subscription-based video on demand service for Amazon Channels, focused on anime series and movies from various anime distributors. The service launched on January 12, 2017, and was closed on January 5, 2018, after which its catalog was incorporated into the Amazon Prime subscription service.

== History ==
On January 12, 2017, Amazon announced the launch of its first branded on-demand subscription service for Amazon Channels, Anime Strike, "offering more than 1,000 series episodes and movies ranging from classic titles to current shows broadcast on Japanese TV." Anime Strike consisted of shows that were streaming exclusively on Amazon Video worldwide, as well as selected titles licensed by Sentai Filmworks.

On January 5, 2018, Amazon discontinued the channel, and most of its exclusive content became watchable with a Prime subscription. Following Anime Strike's closure, several previously exclusive titles began streaming on Hidive, which also streams titles from Sentai Filmworks and Section23 Films.

== Reception ==
Anime Strike's announcement was met with a generally negative reception. Miranda Sanchez wrote an article for IGN titled "Amazon and Netflix Don't Understand Anime Fans", criticizing the service for its expensive pricing.
