= John Ledford =

American businessman and producer

- Born: John Robert Ledford II; August 19, 1968 (age 57); Houston, Texas, U.S.
- Occupations: Businessman, producer
- Known for: Founding Sentai Filmworks, A.D. Vision, Anime Network, and Newtype USA

John Robert Ledford II (born August 19, 1968) is an American entrepreneur and producer in the anime industry. He founded A.D. Vision, Anime Network, Newtype USA and Sentai Filmworks, and has been an executive producer for hundreds of anime titles including Halo Legends, Appleseed Alpha, Short Peace, Sailor Moon, Hello Kitty, and the dubbing of Neon Genesis Evangelion.

== Life and career ==
John Robert Ledford II was born on August 19, 1968, in Houston, Texas, to Gayle Greer (1945–2009) and John Robert Ledford. His mother, Gayle, was a harpist and an equestrian.

A fan of video games, Ledford began his career in 1990 by founding Gametronix. The business grew to become America's second largest importer of Japanese video games and consoles such as Mega Drive, Famicom, Super Famicom and PC Engine. John's interest in anime began after being introduced to My Neighbor Totoro. In 1992, he and his business partner Matt Greenfield turned their attention to the anime industry and founded A.D. Vision.

A.D. Vision (a.k.a. ADV Films or ADV) became a global leader of anime entertainment, innovation, media diversity, branded consumer products, licensing and publishing. By its 10th year, ADV was the largest employer of actors in the Southwest United States and expanded to include Tokyo and UK branches. Within a decade, ADV cemented its status as a major distributor of anime in North America, releasing titles such as Neon Genesis Evangelion, Sailor Moon, and Hello Kitty. The company also released live-action films on DVD, such as Gene Roddenberry's Andromeda and Earth: Final Conflict as well as the Sci-Fi Channel and Jim Henson hit series Farscape, promoted original film releases and ventured into extreme wrestling with Combat Zone Wrestling.

Ledford then founded Anime Network, North America's first all-anime dedicated cable TV network, in 2001; it grew from just 500,000 households to reach over 40,000,000 households. The following year he started publishing Newtype USA in partnership with Kadokawa Publishing. The publishing operation grew to include ADV Manga, which licensed and published hundreds of Japanese manga and Korean manhwa for North American distribution.

Ledford co-founded J-Spec Pictures in 2008 with producer Joseph Chou. The company's first project revolved around Halo, the hit video game franchise by developer Bungie and published by Microsoft Corp.

In 2008, Ledford established separate companies from ADV called Sentai Filmworks and Sentai Holdings. Since then, Sentai has acquired roughly four hundred licenses including a number of acclaimed titles such as Grave of the Fireflies, Ninja Scroll, High School of the Dead, and Gatchaman. In 2014, Sentai Filmworks acquired the North American license to Short Peace, an omnibus collection of four anime shorts including the 86th Academy Awards-nominated Best Animated Short Film "Possessions" directed by Shuhei Morita. The film had a nationwide theatrical release in over 250 theaters.

Ledford created the anime streaming service HIDIVE, which launched in June 2017.

Sentai Filmworks continues to manage one of the world's largest anime libraries released across traditional and digital media platforms. Sentai Filmworks, Sentai Holdings, and the HIDIVE streaming service were sold to AMC Networks in January 2022.

Ledford created Infinite Frontiers in 2010 to aggregate digital content through accounts such as Hulu, Netflix, iTunes, PlayStation and Xbox Live. Still an avid fan of games, two years later he founded Spectre Media as a mobile gaming start up to develop and publish games to Apple iOS, Android and web browsers. The company's debut launch title was Mobile Infantry (Starship Troopers), based on the sci-fi movie, comic and book franchise Starship Troopers.

== Other articles ==
- Anime, Piracy and Profits from CNNMoney
- It's... Profitmón! from Fortune (magazine)
- Anti-Disney Style of 'Manga' and 'Anime' Appeals to Americans from The Japan Times
- 2002 - The Most Powerful from Anime News Network
- ADV Films Founder Ranks on List of Most Powerful People in Genre Entertainment from PR Newswire
- Best Anime Purveyors from Houston Press
- Dubbing, Pricing, Catalogue, Anime Network, Blu-ray, the Future from ICv2
