= Saiyuki Reload: Zeroin =

- Season 5
- Saiyuki Reload: Zeroin volume one Blu-ray cover by DMM pictures
- Native name
- Japanese: 最遊記RELOAD -ZEROIN-
- No. of episodes: 13

Release
- Original network: AT-X, Tokyo MX1, BS11
- Original release: January 6 – March 31, 2022

Season chronology
- ← Previous; Saiyuki Reload Blast

Saiyuki Reload: Zeroin (最遊記RELOAD -ZEROIN-, Saiyūki Reload Zeroin) is a remake of Saiyuki Reload Gunlock and the fifth season of the Saiyuki anime television series adapted from the manga of Saiyuki Reload by Kazuya Minekura and produced by Liden Films.

Saiyuki Reload: Zeroin covers the manga's "Even a Worm" arc. For a long time, humans and youkai have learned to coexist in peace within Shangri-La, the earthly paradise. However, under the influence of powerful negative waves generated by mysterious black magic, the youkai became bloodthirsty monsters and started attacking and devouring humans. This dangerous magic is used for a particularly dark purpose: to resurrect Gyumaoh, the Bull Demon King. In order to thwart this plan and to save humanity from violent slaughter, the goddess Kanzeon Bosatsu decides to send Genjo Sanzo and his three disciples: Son Goku, Sha Gojyo and Cho Hakkai, to the west, in the hope that they prevent Gyumaoh from rising once again.

It is directed by Misato Takada, with Michiko Yokote and Aya Matsui writing the series' scripts, Noriko Ogura designing the characters and serving as chief animation director, and Yūsuke Shirato composing the music. The main cast members reprised their roles. It aired from January 6 to March 31, 2022, on AT-X, Tokyo MX1, BS11 consist of 13 episodes.

Sentai Filmworks licensed the series outside of Asia with HIDIVE streaming the series. In South and Southeast Asia, Muse Communication licensed the anime.

The series was released in two Blu-ray box volumes. Volume 1 was released on April 27, 2022 and volume 2 was released on June 29, 2022.

On December 15, 2022, Sentai Filmworks licensed the anime in Northern America and SECTION23 will be the home video distributor which releases on March 7, 2023.

Granrodeo performed the opening theme "Kamino Hotokemo," while Shugo Nakamura performed the ending theme "Ruten."

== Episode list ==
| No. overall | No. in season | Title | Directed by | Written by | Storyboarded by | Original release date |
|---|---|---|---|---|---|---|
| 114 | 1 | "The Blue-Eyed Angel"; Transliteration: "Aoi Me no Tenshi" (Japanese: 青い目の天使) | Misato Takada | Michiko Yokote | Misato Takada, Hirokazu Hisayuki | January 6, 2022 |
| 115 | 2 | "The Value of Life"; Transliteration: "Inochi no Kachi" (Japanese: 命の価値) | Misato Takada | Michiko Yokote | Misato Takada | January 13, 2022 |
| 116 | 3 | "Humans and Demons"; Transliteration: "Ningen to Yōkai" (Japanese: 人間と妖怪) | Tatsuji Yamazaki | Aya Matsui | Sō Toyama | January 20, 2022 |
| 117 | 4 | "Options"; Transliteration: "Sentaku" (Japanese: 選択) | Misato Takada | Aya Matsui | Sō Toyama | January 27, 2022 |
| 118 | 5 | "The One That Came Back"; Transliteration: "Kaette Kita Aitsu" (Japanese: 帰ってきたアイツ) | Fumiaki Usui, Misato Takada | Aya Matsui | Fumiaki Usui, Misato Takada | February 3, 2022 |
| 119 | 6 | "The Right to Life"; Transliteration: "Inochi no Kenri" (Japanese: 命の権利) | Tetsuya Watanabe | Michiko Yokote | Tetsuya Watanabe | February 10, 2022 |
| 120 | 7 | "Seiten Taisei"; Transliteration: "Seiten Taisei" (Japanese: 斉天大聖) | Tatsuji Yamazaki, Misato Takada | Michiko Yokote | Hirokazu Hisayuki, Misato Takada | February 17, 2022 |
| 121 | 8 | "Oasis"; Transliteration: "Oashisu" (Japanese: オアシス) | Misato Takada | Aya Matsui | Hirokazu Hisayuki | February 24, 2022 |
| 122 | 9 | "Even a Worm Will Turn"; Transliteration: "Issun no Mushi ni mo Gobu no Tamashī" (Japanese: 一寸の虫にも五分の魂) | Haruka Saiga | Aya Matsui | Ai Yoshimura | March 3, 2022 |
| 123 | 10 | "Atonement"; Transliteration: "Tsugunai" (Japanese: 償い) | Yasushi Muroya | Michiko Yokote | Yasushi Muroya | March 10, 2022 |
| 124 | 11 | "The Next Sunrise"; Transliteration: "Tsugi ni Noboru Taiyō" (Japanese: 次にのぼる太陽) | Misato Takada | Aya Matsui | Misato Takada | March 17, 2022 |
| 125 | 12 | "A Memory Revealed"; Transliteration: "Akasareru Kioku" (Japanese: 明かされる記憶) | Tetsuya Watanabe | Aya Matsui | Tetsuya Watanabe | March 24, 2022 |
| 126 | 13 | "The Sanzo Party"; Transliteration: "Sanzō Ikkō" (Japanese: 三蔵一行) | Seiki Takuno, Fumiaki Usui, Misato Takada | Michiko Yokote | Tetsuya Watanabe, Hirokazu Hisayuki, Misato Takada | March 31, 2022 |

== Reception ==
Saiyuki Reload: Zeroin series ranked 18th on Filmarks website's poll of top 20 "must see anime of winter 2022." Chris beveridge of The Fandom Post likes the look of the show because of the better color clarity and the depiction of the 2004 anime design.
