= Helck =

Helck is a surname. Notable people with the surname include:

- Johann Christian Helck (died 1770), German mathematician, teacher, and author of a collection of fables
- Peter Helck (1893−1988), American illustrator
- Wolfgang Helck (1914−1993), German Egyptologist
