= A.D. Vision =

Defunct American entertainment company

A.D. Vision Holdings, Inc.

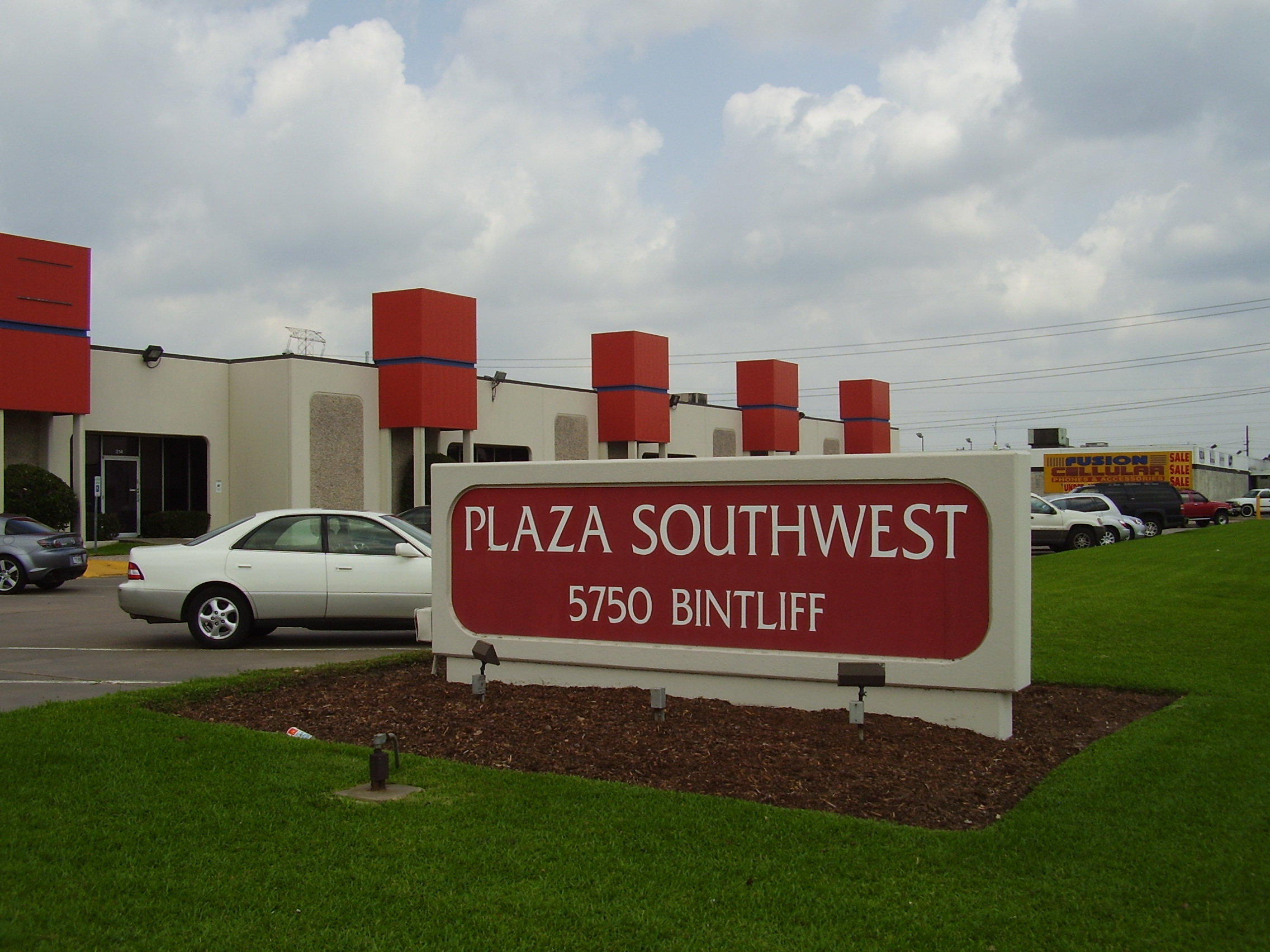
- The Plaza Southwest complex in Greater Sharpstown, Houston, A.D. Vision's former headquarters.
- Type: Private
- Industry: Multimedia entertainment
- Founded: August 17, 1992; 34 years ago (formal); June 30, 1994; 32 years ago (legal)
- Founders: John Ledford; Matt Greenfield; David Williams
- Defunct: September 1, 2009; 17 years ago (operations)
- Fate: Liquidation, split into five successor companies.
- Successors: AEsir Holdings; Maiden Japan; Section23 Films; Sentai Filmworks; Switchblade Pictures
- Headquarters: Plaza Southwest Harwin Dr., Greater Sharpstown, Houston, Texas, United States
- Area served: North America and Europe
- Products: Anime; Manga; Magazines; Films; TV series; Direct-to-video projects; Merchandising
- Owner: Sojitz (20% equity; 2006–2009)
- Website: www.advfilms.com

A.D. Vision Holdings, Inc. (known simply as ADV and also referred to as ADV Films) was an American multimedia entertainment distributor headquartered in Houston, Texas, and founded in 1992 by video game fan John Ledford and anime fans Matt Greenfield and David Williams. The company specialized in home video production and distribution, theatrical film distribution, merchandising, original productions, magazine and comic book publishing. They also ran Anime Network, a television channel devoted to airing the company's titles. Titles distributed by the company included Neon Genesis Evangelion, Super Dimension Fortress Macross, RahXephon, Full Metal Panic!, Azumanga Daioh, Elfen Lied, Gantz, Red Garden, and Le Chevalier D'Eon.

The company maintained offices in North America, Europe and Asia. In addition to North America, ADV Films distributed their home media releases in the United Kingdom, Italy, and Germany. The company was also involved in various lawsuits with other companies, though none of them made it to court.

With declining fortunes in the mid-2000s due to low sales, ADV ceased operations and eventually liquidated their assets in 2009. Sentai Holdings, owner of Section23 Films, Sentai Filmworks, AEsir Holdings, Valkyrie Media Partners, and Seraphim Digital, took over the ADV brand name and still uses it on some of their releases. Most titles formerly licensed by ADV have been re-released by other companies. Sentai was subsequently acquired by AMC Global Media, then known as AMC Networks, in December 2021. As of 2025, ADV exists as a domiciled shell corporation.

== History ==
=== Beginnings ===
The origin of A.D. Vision can be traced back to the early 1990s, when John Ledford, a native of Houston, Texas, started a Japanese video game and video console import business in 1990. He was introduced to anime when he watched My Neighbor Totoro at his friend's suggestion. At the time, Matt Greenfield, born in Sacramento, California, ran a local anime club called Anime NASA, which also included classmate David Williams. After consulting with Ledford, Greenfield joined him and Williams to found A.D. Vision, which officially opened for business on August 17, 1992. Ledford contacted Toho about optioning the rights to license Devil Hunter Yohko. Shozo Watanabe, the general manager of Toho's Los Angeles office, expressed concern that A.D. Vision would not be able to handle the distribution of the film. Unable to find another distributor, Toho convinced A.D. Vision to license the series. That December, Devil Hunter Yohko became the first title to be released by A.D. Vision.

In 2007, Japan's Sojitz announced that Japan Content Investments (JCI), an investment group run by Sojitz, Development Bank of Japan, and film distribution company KlockWorx, planned to contribute money to A.D. Vision, in return for equity in the company. Ledford was to remain the majority shareholder and CEO. JCI subsidiary ARM also planned to contribute money for ADV to use in acquiring new distribution licenses. The investment was to ADV Films to raise its output of new anime titles, which had dropped in 2006, back to previous levels or above. In return, ADV planned to assist Sojitz with the acquisition of North American and European content for importation into Japan. According to ADV, they also reportedly had "big plans" for its manga line. In late 2007, ADV would start experimenting with online streaming of its catalog of anime titles when it launched its VOD streaming service Anime Network Online in late 2007 via its Anime Network channel, which was ultimately replaced and succeeded by HIDIVE a decade later.

=== Partnerships and acquisitions ===
In August 2007, a notice was sent to retailers stating that ADV Films would be taking over the distribution, marketing, and sales of Geneon properties in the US as of October 1. In preparation, Geneon USA laid off most of its sales division; however, in September the distribution deal was canceled. Dentsu confirmed that the distribution deal was canceled through a press release on September 21, 2007 with no reasons given except that Geneon and ADV were "unable to reach a mutual agreement."

In June 2006, 20% of ADV Films was acquired by the Japanese Sojitz Corporation. This was done as a means of acquiring more titles in the Japanese market. From this point on, virtually all titles that ADV acquired were under Sojitz's ownership. However, in January 2008, ADV mysteriously removed a large number of titles from their website. All the titles removed were titles acquired since the Sojitz acquisition including Gurren Lagann, which had test disks sent out with dubbed episodes. As of May 2008, Gurren Lagann was licensed by Bandai Entertainment. ADV Films made booth appearances at the Anime Central 2008 convention, but they canceled their planned panel. In July 2008, Funimation Entertainment (then owned by its parent Navarre Corporation, now owned by Sony Pictures Television under the Crunchyroll brand) announced the acquisition of thirty of these titles.

On October 20, 2008, it was announced that ADV had entered into a licensing arrangement with new licensor Sentai Filmworks. The highlight of the new partnership was that ADV would be distributing the anime television adaptation of the popular visual novel Clannad, also they acquired the distribution rights to Koharu Biyori, Mahoromatic, Mahoromatic: Something More Beautiful (both were previously licensed by Geneon), Tsukihime (previously licensed by Geneon), Pet Shop of Horrors (previously licensed by Urban Vision), and Jewel BEM Hunter Lime (previously licensed by Media Blasters).

Following the May 2009 bankruptcy and liquidation of Central Park Media, ADV Films acquired the North American rights of Grave of the Fireflies and re-released it on DVD on July 7, 2009. ADV Films also acquired the licenses of multiple other Central Park Media titles as well.

=== Collapse ===
On September 1, 2009, ADV announced that it was ceasing all operations and selling its assets, including intellectual properties, its distribution arm and the Anime Network. These assets would be transferred to four companies: Seraphim Studios, AEsir Holdings LLC, Valkyrie Media Partners LLC and SXION 23 LLC. The impact of this sale on the company's plans to license and release new titles, is still not fully known, but the ADV brand name and logo have been retired. Anime News Network has reported that Seraphim Studios, Valkyrie Media Partners and SXION 23 are all corporations registered (initially filed) by Griffin D. Vance IV, who was ADV's senior vice president of business and legal affairs.

The following companies all acquired assets from A.D. Vision:

- Sentai Filmworks took over distribution of new titles for the North American market.
- AEsir Holdings acquired the rights to most of ADV Films' former library of titles (some titles were licensed directly by Sentai Filmworks).
- Seraphim Studios acquired Amusement Park Media, ADV's production studio, and renamed it Seraphim Digital Studios.
- Valkyrie Media Partners acquired the Anime Network. The network continued to operate as before the sale.
- Section23 Films operates Switchblade Pictures, Sentai Filmworks, Maiden Japan and AEsir Holdings.

That day, major retail website Robert's Corner Anime Blog contacted Mike Bailiff, formerly of ADV Films and later the head of Sales and Marketing at Section 23 Films. Bailiff revealed that "Section 23 has acquired all of ADV's former licenses and most of the staff" including "everyone at ADV that mattered."

On September 18, 2009, the anime review site iSugoi.com posted a full podcast devoted to the shutdown of ADV, analyzing that ADV had not shut down and the new companies such as Section 23 were ADV selling itself to itself: that it was not a shutdown but a drastic rebranding and restructuring. The report went on to say that Section 23 was, for all intents and purposes, the direct successor-organization to the old ADV company name, and that ADV split its assets such as the Anime Network into the other three companies to take advantage of several legal loopholes. The podcast report concluded with the assertion that Section 23, and the umbrella of associated companies ADV split into, could effectively be thought of as Neo-ADV (referencing how in Mobile Suit Gundam, when the Principality of Zeon was defeated, its remnants reorganized into Neo Zeon).

On October 15, 2009, rival distribution company Funimation posted an online Q&A video panel hosted by events manager Adam Sheehan. When asked about ADV going out of business, Sheehan's response was the following:

ADV isn't out of business. ADV did remaster itself, as you might call it, and change itself into multiple different companies (Section 23, etc.), holding different parts of its brands, of its marketing, so [it's] still around ... the best way I would describe it is to think of it as Voltron: if it turned back into the five lions, so it's not the one Voltron robot anymore, so the ADV logo is no longer around, but the lions and all the properties are still around.

Ken Hoinsky, Managing Founder of MX Media LLC, a translation and localization company contracting with most major anime distribution companies (Funimation, Viz Media, Bandai), appeared on the October 29, 2009, Anime News Network podcast: in it he said that his company also contracts with Section 23, but that he also collectively refers to the allied companies that ADV split into as Neo-ADV.

== Divisions ==
=== ADV Films ===
ADV Films was the home video publication arm of A.D. Vision based in Houston, Texas, specializing in publishing anime and tokusatsu videos, as well as other live-action material. In 1996, ADV Films opened its UK division, and diversified into the realm of live-action television series and Japanese films.

The first title to be licensed and released to video was Devil Hunter Yohko. After that, they began acquiring an extensive library of titles. Initially, titles were released to video with the original Japanese language track and English subtitles added. A few years later, they began dubbing releases to English using a production and recording facility in Houston. They eventually started offering their recording services to other companies, so this studio was named Amusement Park Media. This studio was sold to Seraphim Digital after their bankruptcy.

ADV Films offered a program called Anime ADVocates, which provided free screening material and other promotional content to nearly 3,000 anime clubs in North America. To qualify for the program, the club had to be sponsored by a local high school, college, university, or public library and have at least 10 members. Member clubs were also asked to participate in surveys about the content they received. However, in November 2007, ADV Films put the program on hiatus, then on January 18, 2008, ADV Films announced that the program was being suspended indefinitely due to amount of resources the program needed. The company continued to offer anime clubs screening permission for its titles prior to its reorganization.

In July 2008, ADV Films and ARM Corporation transferred the licenses to over 30 different shows into the hands of fellow anime distributor Funimation. Those rights included the home video, broadcast, digital, and merchandising rights in North America and other regions.

Since then, former ADV titles have since been re-licensed by other companies such as Funimation, Sentai Filmworks, Discotek Media, Universal, Paramount and Nozomi Entertainment. Today, the ADV Films brand name is owned by Sentai Filmworks, who has released several titles under its name, such as Mezzo DSA on DVD, Kino's Journey on DVD, and standard-definition Blu-ray, Elfen Lied on DVD and Blu-ray, and Lady Death: The Motion Picture on Blu-ray.

=== Anime Network ===
Anime Network was a cable channel in North America dedicated to anime. The network launched in North America in late 2002 and was marketed to multi-system operators (MSOs) as both a stand-alone 24-hour linear network and as a video on demand (VOD) programming service. The Anime Network was the United States' first all-anime cable TV network. On January 4, 2008, Anime Network officially announced that the traditional 24/7 service would cease operations. It operated on many cable and satellite operators such as DirecTV, Dish Network, Cox, Time Warner, Cablevision, and Charter, and also had a Roku app. It is though the Anime Network where ADV would start experimenting with online streaming of its catalog with the launch of the Anime Network's streaming service, Anime Network Online, in late 2007, which was decommissioned in 2017 following the launch of HIDIVE.

=== ADV Manga ===
ADV Manga was ADV's division for the licensing and distribution of English translations of Japanese manga. The division was launched in 2003, with a strong list of titles and an ambitious plan for growth within the United States manga market. However, ADV Manga canceled many of their titles in late 2004 and 2005. In 2006, ADV Manga released the 6-volume Neon Genesis Evangelion: Angelic Days series and in 2007 the company resumed releasing several popular titles that had been on hiatus, including Yotsuba&! and Gunslinger Girl.

At Anime Expo 2006, manga publisher Tokyopop announced that it had obtained the licenses for three titles formerly licensed by ADV that had been cancelled: Aria, Tactics, and Peacemaker Kurogane. Meanwhile, Yen Press has acquired the rights to Yotsuba&! and Azumanga Daioh.

=== ADV Music ===
ADV Music was the music publishing division that focused on distributing anime and movie soundtracks. It was launched in 2003 after ending their partnership in AnimeTrax with The Right Stuf International. One initial release was the soundtrack for Onimusha 2: Samurai's Destiny.

=== ADV Pro ===
ADV Pro was the company's anime production studio. They worked on such in house productions as Lady Death: The Motion Picture and Mutineers' Moon. John Ledford stated in 2007 that ADV Pro had been "reactivated" and was working on Mutineers' Moon.

=== ADV Kids ===
ADV Kids was their label for works intended at younger audiences, with releases such as Sonic the Hedgehog OVA and Mega Man: Upon a Star. Video releases of American animated series based on Capcom properties such as Mega Man (1994) and Street Fighter (1995) were also released under the label, serving as one of few Western animation releases from the company.

=== SoftCel Pictures ===
SoftCel Pictures was the branch of the company that specialized in the release of hentai anime titles on VHS and DVD. The first product released was Legend of Lyon Flare. This division was shut down in 2005 after spinning off from ADV, and most of its titles were acquired by Critical Mass, the hentai division of The Right Stuf International, who later sold its hentai division to BuyAnime. In 2017, the SoftCel label was relaunched by Section23 Films, one of ADV's successor companies.

=== Happy Carrot ===
ADV started the Happy Carrot branch in 2008 to release hentai anime titles on DVD, replacing SoftCel.

== Magazines ==
=== Newtype USA ===
Newtype USA was the US edition of Japan's Newtype magazine. The first issue was published in November 2002. A.D. Vision (ADV) contacted its advertising partners to let them know that the February 2008 issue of Newtype USA was the last issue of the magazine. The magazine contained material it translated from the Japanese release as well as articles from American writers. It was expected to have 50,000 copies in for its initial circulation.

=== PiQ ===
PiQ premiered in May 2008 as a replacement for Newtype USA. It was published by PiQ LLC, a now-defunct subsidiary. The magazine had a broader focus and expanded coverage of topics beyond anime and manga. PiQ retained much of the editorial staff and freelance writers that once worked on its predecessor, as well as its 15,000 subscribers. In June 2008, after only four issues had been published, PiQ was canceled and its offices abruptly closed down. The July 2008 dated issue, which had already been released when the announcement was made, was the magazine's last issue.

== Lawsuits ==
=== ARM Corporation ===
In 2008, A.D. Vision sued ARM Corporation and its parent Sojitz for a breach in a contract made previously. In the suit, the exact amount A.D. Vision paid to license twenty-nine titles was disclosed. The lawsuit was withdrawn, and no ruling was made.

=== Gainax ===
In August 2011, A.D. Vision sued Gainax over their refusal to accept an option payment for the perpetual live-action rights to Neon Genesis Evangelion, including the planned live-action film; ADV charged that by refusing to accept payment, Gainax broke the contract and was asking for the rights and legal fees.

=== Funimation ===
In 2012, Funimation sued A.D. Vision, Sentai Filmworks, John Ledford, and several other associated organizations and individuals for US$8 million, accusing them of breaching a contract. They wanted to get their transfer of assets done three years earlier declared void. The suit was settled out of court. The exact terms were not disclosed.

== See also ==
- List of anime distributed in the United States
- List of anime releases made concurrently in the United States and Japan
- Sola Digital Arts, a company founded by former producer Joseph Chou
