= Anime Network =

Group of anime television programming services

- Country: United States, Canada; United Kingdom (former)

Programming
- Picture format: 480i (SDTV)

Ownership
- Owner: A.D. Vision (2002–2009); Sentai Holdings, LLC (AMC Networks) (2009–2025)

History
- Launched: 2002; 24 years ago
- Closed: 2008; 18 years ago (linear broadcasting); 2023; 3 years ago (subscription video on demand service); December 31, 2025; 10 months ago (video on demand service)
- Replaced by: ANIME x HIDIVE; HIDIVE (streaming)

Anime Network was an American video on demand (VOD) network dedicated to anime owned by Sentai Filmworks, which has been a part of AMC Global Media (formerly AMC Networks) since December 2021. The network also had its own streaming service Anime Network Online, which was launched in the late 2000s and discontinued and replaced in June 2017 by HIDIVE.

== History ==
Logo from 2002–2014

The network was launched in North America in late 2002 and is marketed to multi system operators (MSOs) as both a free and subscription video on demand (VOD) programming service. Anime Network also provides online streaming of its anime for North America via its website with free full-length preview episodes for non-members, more episodes for members, and all online titles available for subscribers.

In October 2007, Anime Network was launched on DirecTV On Demand, initially on channel 1801 at launch. From the fall of 2015 through the network's end, it was found on channel 1889.

A.D. Vision would begin using the Anime Network to experiment with online streaming of its anime catelog with the launch of its online VOD platform Anime Network Online in late 2007, starting with the anime that had previously aired on the network. The platform featured anime that was licensed by A.D. Vision and later its Sentai Filmworks successor until 2017, when Anime Network Online was ultimately replaced by its successor now known today as HIDIVE in mid-2017.

The Anime Network ceased broadcast of its linear 24/7 network on January 1, 2008; it continues to support a VOD service and online player on its main website. On September 1, 2009, A.D. Vision had sold off Anime Network to Valkyrie Media Partners LLC. with as part of the dissolution of the company and the reorganization of its assets.

On June 20, 2017, with the launch of HIDIVE, Section23 Films announced it would discontinue the Anime Network Online streaming service and focus solely on Anime Network's pay television and subscription VOD services, while HIDIVE, LLC, a new company which is not affiliated with Anime Network, Section23, or Sentai Filmworks, acquired Anime Network Online's assets and spun them off into the newly formed streaming service. That same day, Anime Network Inc. announced it acquired the "www.theanimenetwork.com" domain name from Anime Network Online.

As of 2023, the Anime Network has been discontinued with all of the Anime Network's licensed anime library were transferred to Hidive. The remaining video on demand service was discontinued on December 31, 2025.

== Availability and distribution ==
At launch, the Anime Network was only available by video on demand to Comcast subscribers in the Philadelphia area with 1.2 million customers with more providers choosing to carry the service later on. The linear service launched on June 30, 2004, to complement the VOD service. Comcast Communications previously carried the channel on video on demand since its launch. On May 29, 2009, Comcast discontinued carriage of the service in both its free package and its pay-per-view digital television package which, however, are periodically included among Comcast Xfinity's Top Picks.

=== 24/7 linear service ===
From June 30, 2004, to January 4, 2008, Anime Network offered a 24/7 channel available to pay television providers. The service was only carried by small cable companies. On January 4, 2008, Anime Network officially announced that the 24/7 service would cease operations. The network would still operate as a VOD provider until 2017.

=== Video on demand ===
The Anime Network's content was distributed through video on demand in two formats.

Type	Abbreviation	Content Information	Notes
Free On Demand	Free VOD	Up to 18 episodes per week. Content is unedited and not ad supported.	Available to DirecTV, Time Warner Cable, Bright House Networks and Buckeye CableSystem customers. Providers who offer Subscription On Demand may make the Free On Demand package available to all their customers.
Subscription On Demand	SVOD	Up to 45 hours, content is unedited. Subscription On Demand subscribers also receive new premieres, shows, and exclusive content not available to Free On Demand customers.	Carried on six of the nation's top ten cable providers and various smaller cable companies. Providers like Cox, Suddenlink and Insight will also distribute the Free On Demand package to all their customers. Some providers like Charter, Mediacom and Shaw Digital TV will only make the Subscription On Demand package available. Dish Network carries a pay-per-view based Subscription On Demand on their DISH Online service.

Sony announced at E3 2010 that the PlayStation Network would begin carrying The Anime Network.

== Anime Network (UK) ==
Anime Network
- Country: United Kingdom
- Network: Propeller TV

Ownership
- Owner: A.D. Vision

History
- Launched: June 3, 2007
- Closed: January 1, 2008

On June 3, 2007, Anime Network was launched in the United Kingdom as a programming block on the Propeller TV satellite channel, produced by A.D. Vision. It was broadcast as a 2-hour block with 4 different anime series and aired from 8:00 pm to 10:00 pm, 7 days a week. The block was removed from the schedule on January 1, 2008, which was the same day Anime Network discontinued its North American 24/7 linear service to continue to support its VOD service.

=== Programming ===
- Azumanga Daioh
- Chobits
- Coyote Ragtime Show
- Elfen Lied
- Guyver: The Bioboosted Armor
- Innocent Venus
- Jinki:Extend
- Kaleido Star
- Kurau: Phantom Memory
- Neon Genesis Evangelion
- Pani Poni Dash
- Princess Tutu
- This Ugly Yet Beautiful World
