= Hidive =

American video streaming service

- Logo used since launch
- Company type: Division
- Website type: OTT streaming platform
- Available in: English
- Predecessor: Anime Network Online
- Headquarters: Houston, Texas, U.S.
- Area served: North America, United Kingdom, Ireland, and Oceania
- Owner: AMC Global Media
- Industry: Entertainment
- Products: Streaming media; video on demand; digital distribution
- Services: Film distribution; television distribution
- Parent: Hidive, LLC
- Website: www.hidive.com
- Commercial: Yes
- Registration: Required
- Users: 300,000 (2020)
- Launched: June 20, 2017; 9 years ago
- Current status: Active

Hidive (stylized in all caps) is an American subscription video on demand over-the-top streaming service owned by AMC Global Media. The service primarily offers anime content to paid subscribers.

The service was launched in June 2017 as a successor to Anime Network Online, a streaming service that was operated by Anime Network which survived after the liquidation of the former A.D. Vision's assets in 2009. It even had its own channel on Crunchyroll's VRV service from 2018 until the Sony acquisition of Crunchyroll in 2021.

Hidive and its parent Sentai Filmworks were both acquired by AMC Global Media, then known as AMC Networks, in December 2021 and restricted access to English language markets in December 2023. The streaming service offers a number of features, among those include live chat, customizable viewing features, customized profiles and subtitles, and parental controls among other things.

== History ==
=== Early years ===
The origin of HIDIVE can be traced back to the late 2000s when in c. 2007, A.D. Vision, Sentai's predecessor, began experimenting with online streaming of its anime catalog via the now defunct Anime Network with the launch of its online VOD service Anime Network Online, starting with anime shows which had previously aired on the Anime Network. It primarily featured anime shows that were licensed by A.D. Vision, and later Sentai Filmworks, and were often streamed on the platform until the launch of HIDIVE.

The Hidive streaming service launched in June 2017, as Hidive, LLC, a new company not affiliated with Anime Network, was formed and shortly after, acquired Anime Network Online's assets and spun them off into the new streaming service. Former subscriptions from Anime Network Online were later transferred to Hidive.

Like its predecessor, Anime Network Online, it exclusively streams select licensed titles from Sentai and Section23, as well as a handful that was formerly held by A.D. Vision, including a small number of titles that were previously exclusive to the defunct streaming channel Anime Strike.

On July 21, 2017, Hidive announced the service would start to offer selected anime titles with Spanish and Portuguese subtitles and began offering "Dubcasts" later in March 2018. Similar to SimulDubs, it competes against FUNimation's SimulDub program, which allows Hidive to stream dubs of simulcast titles approximately two to three weeks after the initial Japanese broadcast.

VRV announced that Hidive would be launching its channel on its service on October 18, 2018, after Funimation ended their partnership with Crunchyroll. It replaced Funimation after it left the service on November 9, 2018.

Sony announced its acquisition of VRV's parent company Crunchyroll from AT&T on August 9, 2021, via its FUNimation subsidiary. Hidive left the service a month later on September 30 in response to the acquisition.

=== AMC acquisition ===
Hidive was part of the AMC Global Media (then known as AMC Networks) acquisition of Sentai in December 2021, which was announced a month later at the start of January 2022.

In November 2023, the service announced that it will end service in certain areas outside North America, which went into effect later in December.

In March 2024, Hidive's website was updated with a new user interface. New features were also added, such as offline viewing, updated history queues, and the ability to create multiple customized watchlists. It later brought back the schedule and customized profiles features in August, both of which were features that were previously available prior to the major update of the site.

== Programming ==
At launch, Hidive featured much of the same content that was on its Anime Network Online predecessor, which in-itself featured notable titles licensed by A.D. Vision and its successor, Sentai Filmworks.

In some cases, Hidive would sometimes stream anime that are not licensed by Sentai; notable examples of this includes their streaming of The Promised Neverland in January 2019, (Note: Which is originally licensed by Aniplex of America.) and Pon no Michi in January 2026. (Note: Animation Digital Network also streamed it internationally on the YouTube channel.)

In September 2022, Hidive would briefly expand into original programing when it co-premiered the AMC+ original series Pantheon.

=== ANIME x HIDIVE ===
ANIME x HIDIVE
- Type: FAST television channel
- Country: United States
- Broadcast area: Nationwide
- Headquarters: Houston, Texas

Programming
- Language: English
- Picture format: 1080p HDTV (downscaled to letterboxed 480p for older programming)

Ownership
- Owner: AMC Global Media
- Parent: Sentai Filmworks
- Sister channels: AMC+; We TV; IFC; Sundance TV; BBC America

History
- Launched: March 10, 2023; 3 years ago
- Replaced: Anime Network

Availability

Streaming media
- The Roku Channel: Channel 367
- Plex: None
- Pluto TV: None

In April 2022, AMC announced the development of a Hidive-branded Free ad-supported streaming television (FAST) channel called "ANIME x HIDIVE", which would feature content licensed by Sentai and seen on the Hidive streaming service. The channel would launch on Plex on March 10, 2023.

== See also ==
- Crunchyroll, a similar yet competing Sony-owned anime streaming service.
- List of anime distributed in the United States
- List of anime releases made concurrently in the United States and Japan
