= Sentai Filmworks =

American entertainment company

Sentai Filmworks, LLC
- Type: Subsidiary
- Industry: Entertainment
- Genre: Anime
- Predecessor: A.D. Vision
- Founded: June 4, 2008; 18 years ago
- Founder: John Ledford
- Headquarters: 10114 West Sam Houston Parkway; Alief, Houston, Texas 77099, U.S.
- Area served: North America, United Kingdom, Ireland, and Oceania
- Key people: John Ledford (CEO)
- Products: Anime; Asian cinema; Merchandising; Home video
- Services: Licensing; publishing; streaming; television
- Parent: AMC Global Media
- Divisions: Sentai Studios
- Website: www.sentaifilmworks.com

Sentai Filmworks, LLC (or simply as just Sentai) is an American entertainment company. Based in Houston, the company specializes in the dubbing and distribution of Japanese animation and Asian cinema and is one of five successors to ADV Films, others being Section23, Switchblade Pictures, Maiden Japan, and AEsir Holdings. It also runs its own post-production arm Sentai Studios.

The company's origins can be traced back to its predecessor A.D. Vision, which was founded in 1992 by video game fan John Ledford and Matt Greenfield. ADV collapsed due to low sales and eventually liquidated their assets in 2009. Ledford founded Sentai in 2008 and acquired the majority of ADV's titles. It was then acquired by New York City-based AMC Global Media in December 2021 and has been a subsidiary since then. Its offices are in the International District in Southwest Houston.

Despite its name, the company has no relation to and therefore has no involvement in any international distribution of the Super Sentai media franchise.

== History ==
=== Origins ===
Origins of Sentai Filmworks go back to the early 1990s with the founding of its predecessor A.D. Vision. In 1990, John Ledford, a native of Houston, started a Japanese video game and video console import business. He was introduced to anime when he watched My Neighbor Totoro at his friend's suggestion. His friend, Matt Greenfield, born in Sacramento, California, ran a local anime club called Anime NASA. Both men would later establish A.D. Vision on August 17, 1992. Devil Hunter Yohko was ADV's first release, after Ledford contacted Toho about optioning for the rights to license the series.

=== Ledford establishes Sentai ===
In June 2006, the Japanese Sojitz Corporation acquired a 20% stake in ADV Films. This was done as a means for ADV Films to acquire more titles in the Japanese market. From this point on, virtually all titles that ADV acquired were with Sojitz's help. The following year, Sojitz announced that Japan Content Investments (JCI), Development Bank of Japan, and film distribution company KlockWorx, planned to contribute money to ADV, in return for equity in the company. Ledford was to remain the majority shareholder and CEO. JCI subsidiary ARM also planned to contribute money for ADV to use in acquiring new distribution licenses. The investment was to ADV Films to raise its output of new anime titles, which had dropped in 2006, back to previous levels or above. In return, ADV planned to assist Sojitz with the acquisition of North American and European content for importation into Japan. According to ADV, they also reportedly had "big plans" for its manga line.

However, in January 2008, ADV mysteriously removed a large number of titles from their website. Among the titles which were subsequently removed was Gurren Lagann, which had test disks sent out with dubbed episodes. As a result, ADV sued ARM Corporation and its parent Sojitz for a breach in a contract made previously. In the suit, the exact amount ADV paid to license twenty-nine titles was disclosed. The lawsuit was withdrawn and no ruling was made. That July, Funimation announced the acquisition of thirty of these titles licensed by Sojitz from ADV.

Ledford established Sentai Filmworks in 2008. Some of its first titles to be released were Clannad, Princess Resurrection, Indian Summer, Appleseed and Mahoromatic (formerly licensed by Geneon). On September 1, 2009, ADV went defunct and sold off its assets, which included transferring distribution rights to Section23 Films.

On July 4, 2013, during its industry panel at Anime Expo, Sentai Filmworks announced its plans to release a number of classic titles from Tatsunoko Production. The current list of released titles from the partnership include the original Gatchaman series and movie, Time Bokan: Royal Revival, and Casshan, and more titles followed.

Sunrise announced a licensing deal with Sentai Filmworks that included a number of titles from Sunrise's library that were formerly licensed by Bandai Entertainment during its Otakon panel on August 8, 2013.

=== Later history ===
In 2014, Sentai opened its in-house localization and recording facility, Sentai Studios.

On June 1, 2015, Sentai made an announcement on its website that Akame ga Kill! had been picked up by Adult Swim for broadcast on its Toonami programming block, almost one week after its announcement at MomoCon 2015. The show began airing on the broadcast night of August 8, 2015, and its premiere night was one of the most watched programs in the block's history with over 1.8 million viewers. Later that year, Parasyte -the maxim-, premiered on October 3. Sentai has promoted the time that the two shows air as "#SentaiHour" on social media. On July 6, 2019, Food Wars!: Shokugeki no Soma began airing on Toonami.

In March 2017, Sentai signed a deal with Amazon to stream the majority of its new licensees exclusively on its Anime Strike channel on Amazon Prime Video in the United States, starting with the Spring 2017 season. After Anime Strike was shuttered in early 2018, all titles previously exclusive to the service were made available to Amazon Prime subscribers in the U.S. at no extra charge.

HIDIVE, a new streaming service that hosted the company's catalog, was launched in June 2017.

On July 18, 2019, Sentai Filmworks launched a GoFundMe appeal in the wake of the arson attack at Kyoto Animation. With a target of US$750,000, it surpassed the $1 million donation mark within the first 24 hours, and reached $2,370,910 at closing.

On August 1, 2019, Sentai Filmworks' parent company Sentai Holdings, LLC announced that the Cool Japan Fund invested US$30 million for shares of the company, stating that "Sentai's independent status makes it a rarity in North America as a licensor of Japanese anime". On September 30, 2020, the Cool Japan Fund made an additional US$3.6 million available, stating that Sentai had achieved better financial results in 2019 compared to 2018, with plans for medium and long-term growth, and strategic changes following the COVID-19 pandemic.

On September 5, 2020, Crunchyroll announced that they had entered in a partnership with Sentai Filmworks to distribute Crunchyroll licensed titles onto home video and electronic sell-through, with Granbelm, Food Wars!: Shokugeki no Soma: The Fourth Plate, Ascendance of a Bookworm, and World Trigger being the first titles distributed through the partnership.

=== AMC ownership ===
In December 2021, AMC Global Media (then known as AMC Networks) acquired Sentai Filmworks and its parent company Sentai Holdings, LLC, including the Hidive streaming service, and the Anime Network, which was then announced a month later on January 5, 2022. Prior to the sale, in August 2021, Sony's Funimation Global Group (a joint venture between Sony Pictures and Aniplex) acquired Ellation (the parent company of Crunchyroll, from AT&T's WarnerMedia), and later on, in March 2022, Funimation would be rebranded as Crunchyroll, LLC. This would eventually lead to several Sentai titles departing from the Crunchyroll streaming service on March 31, 2022.

After Right Stuf was acquired by Sony in August 2022, Sentai announced on March 7, 2023, that the distribution of all future home releases from them along with Section23 Films would be managed by Distribution Solutions (DS), the releasing unit of wholesaler Alliance Entertainment, on April 3.

On March 2, 2023, Sentai announced a partnership and distribution agreement with Mainichi Broadcasting System, starting with The Most Heretical Last Boss Queen, which was the first title to be released from the partnership. Another title that were also released through the partnership was I Parry Everything. In August 2026, Sentai and Mainichi Broadcasting System announced that they had extended the multi-year partnership, where Sentai announced that its Hidive streaming service would begin simulcasting MBS's upcoming lineup. Also in the expanded deal, Sentai announced that it will stream Nia Liston: The Merciless Maiden on its Hidive streaming service.

== Foreign distribution ==
Sentai Filmworks does not directly release its properties outside of America but instead sub-licenses to other companies. In 2011, MVM Entertainment licensed Mahoromatic: Something More Beautiful after Sentai's re-release of the series and has done the same with Broken Blade.

In March 2018, it was revealed that Sentai held the distribution rights to the film No Game No Life: Zero that the company gave to the Mexican distributor Madness Entertainment. It was revealed that they directly commissioned a Spanish dubbed version for the film. On March 15, Sentai announced the acquisition of Alice or Alice to Spain and Portugal.

== Notable titles ==
- 2.5 Dimensional Seduction
- After the Rain
- Ahiru no Sora
- Akame ga Kill!
- Another
- Appleseed
- Armored Trooper Votoms
- Azumanga Daioh
- Bad Girl
- Beyond the Boundary
- Beheneko: The Elf-Girl's Cat is Secretly an S-Ranked Monster!
- Bloom Into You
- Call of the Night
- Carole & Tuesday (home video rights)
- Chained Soldier
- Chivalry of a Failed Knight
- Clannad
- Dark Gathering
- Dororo
- Dungeon People
- Elfen Lied
- Fate/stay night
- Food Wars!: Shokugeki no Soma (seasons 1–2)
- From Bureaucrat to Villainess: Dad's Been Reincarnated!
- Girls und Panzer
- Golden Time
- Gushing over Magical Girls
- Helck
- Hidamari Sketch
- Highschool of the Dead
- How I Attended an All-Guy's Mixer
- Insomniacs After School
- Is It Wrong to Try to Pick Up Girls in a Dungeon?
- Is the Order a Rabbit?
- Jellyfish Can't Swim in the Night
- K-On!
- Kakegurui (home video rights)
- Land of the Lustrous
- Legend of the Galactic Heroes
- Love Flops
- Love, Chunibyo & Other Delusions
- Lupin the 3rd Part 6
- Made in Abyss
- Maid Sama!
- Medaka Box
- Monster Musume
- Monthly Girls' Nozaki-kun
- My Isekai Life
- My Teen Romantic Comedy SNAFU
- Nana
- Non Non Biyori
- No Game No Life
- Oshi no Ko (seasons 1–2 only)
- Parasyte -the maxim-
- Plus-Sized Elf
- Princess Tutu
- Ragna Crimson
- Reincarnated as a Sword
- Rock Is a Lady's Modesty
- Saiyuki Gaiden
- Saiyuki Reload: Zeroin
- School-Live!
- Shirobako
- Sword of the Demon Hunter: Kijin Gentōshō
- Teasing Master Takagi-san (season 3 only)
- The Dangers in My Heart
- The Eminence in Shadow
- The Garden of Words
- The Pet Girl of Sakurasou
- The Tunnel to Summer, the Exit of Goodbyes
- To Love Ru
- Urusei Yatsura (2022 series)
- Ushio & Tora
- The Vexations of a Shut-In Vampire Princess
- Vinland Saga (season 1 only)
- Whisper Me a Love Song
- Ya Boy Kongming!

== See also ==
- Sola Digital Arts, a company founded by former producer Joseph Chou
- History of anime in the United States
