= Section23 Films =

American multimedia distributor

SXION 23 LLC
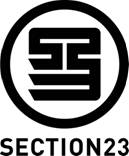
- Formerly: ADV Films (1992–2009)
- Type: Private
- Industry: Anime; Japanese films
- Predecessor: A.D. Vision
- Founded: September 1, 2009; 16 years ago
- Founder: John Ledford
- Headquarters: Houston, Texas, U.S.
- Area served: United States, Canada
- Products: TV series Theatrical films

SXION 23 LLC, doing business as Section23 Films, is an American multimedia distributor based in Houston, Texas specializing in releasing anime and Japanese films. Established in 2009, Section23 is one of five successors to ADV Films; alongside Sentai Filmworks, Switchblade Pictures, Maiden Japan, and AEsir Holdings. The company is named after a Texas tax code.

== List of Section23 Films clients ==
=== Sentai Filmworks ===
Sentai Filmworks is an anime licensing company founded by Ledford in 2008. It partnered with ADV Films to distribute new releases and shows that were previously released and licensed by Geneon Entertainment USA, Urban Vision, Central Park Media, and Bandai Entertainment. After ADV Films sold its assets, the ADV Films name was dropped as a production entity and folded into Sentai Filmworks, with distribution being handled by Section23. Sentai's first title was a re-release of Mahoromatic. This company has been a part of AMC Global Media since December 2021.

=== Switchblade Pictures ===
Switchblade Pictures is a licensing company that mostly licenses live-action Japanese films (mostly, uncut horror, erotic and shock value cinema). Along with Sentai Filmworks, Switchblade was also formed in 2008 and ADV Films also provided initial distribution. Since ADV's folding, distribution is handled by Section23. Their first release was Cruel Restaurant.

=== Maiden Japan ===
Maiden Japan is an anime licensing studio, created in 2010, that licenses subtitled and English dubbed series and collections with distribution handled by Section23. Maiden Japan is a sister label to Switchblade Pictures. Titles licensed include newer subtitled series as well as classic anime titles from the 1980s and 1990s (such as Patlabor, New Dominion Tank Police, and Royal Space Force: The Wings of Honnêamise). The first release for Maiden Japan was the erotic comedy Papillon Rose as a subtitled DVD collection in 2010.

=== AEsir Holdings ===
AEsir Holdings is an anime licensing studio. They hold the rights to several titles which formerly belonged to ADV Films before its shutdown. Released titles include Princess Tutu, Parasite Dolls, Saiyuki, and Lady Death: The Motion Picture.

=== Kraken Releasing ===
Kraken Releasing is a licensing studio that specializes in licensing international films that are of the fantasy, science fiction, tokusatsu and horror variety. Kraken is a live-action sister label to Switchblade Pictures and Maiden Japan.

=== SoftCel Pictures ===
SoftCel Pictures is a licensing studio focusing on hentai. It was originally the hentai label for ADV Films before being shut down in 2005 after splitting from ADV. In 2017, SoftCel was relaunched and released their first new title, The Patients of Dr. Maro in June 2017.

=== Sentai Kids ===
Sentai Kids is a licensing studio focusing on kids' properties. It was originally the kids label for ADV Films known as ADV Kids. Sentai Kids' first and only release has been confirmed to be Hello Kitty & Friends - Let's Learn Together releasing on home video and digital in the United States, Canada, United Kingdom, Australia, and New Zealand, in November 2018.

== Foreign distribution ==
Section23 Films, Sentai Filmworks, Maiden Japan, and AEsir Holdings do not directly release their properties in non–North American (English-speaking) markets as opposed to their predecessor, A.D. Vision, instead sublicensing to other companies such as Manga Entertainment, MVM Entertainment, Anime Limited, and Animatsu Entertainment in the United Kingdom, and Siren Visual, Madman Entertainment, and Hanabee in Australia and New Zealand.
