= List of Angel Beats! episodes =

Cover art of the first DVD compilation released by Aniplex, featuring main character Yuri

The Japanese anime television series Angel Beats! is based on an original concept by Jun Maeda with original character design by Na-Ga; both Maeda and Na-Ga are from the visual novel brand Key known for producing such titles as Kanon, Air, and Clannad. It is directed by Seiji Kishi and produced by the animation studio P.A. Works and production company Aniplex. Chief animator Katsuzō Hirata is also the character designer and the screenplay was written by Maeda. The music, composed by Maeda and the group Anant-Garde Eyes, is produced by Aniplex with Satoki Iida as the sound director. The plot takes place in the afterlife and follows the main protagonist Yuzuru Otonashi, a boy who lost his memories of his life after dying. He is enrolled into the afterlife school and meets a girl named Yuri Nakamura who invites him to join the Afterlife Battlefront (死んだ世界戦線, Shinda Sekai Sensen (SSS))—an organization she leads which fights against God. The SSS fight against the student council president Angel, a girl with supernatural powers.

The series aired 13 episodes between April 3 and June 26, 2010, on the CBC television network in Japan. It aired at later dates than CBC on BS11, MBS, RKB, TBS, and TUT. The first episode was previewed on March 22, 2010, to a selected number of people who participated in a lottery held earlier that month. The series was released on seven BD/DVD compilation volumes between June 23 and December 22, 2010, in limited and regular editions. Three drama CDs, written by Maeda and performed by the anime's cast, were released with the first, fourth and sixth limited edition BD/DVD volumes. The seventh BD/DVD volume featured an original video animation (OVA) episode, as well as a bonus short which serves as another epilogue to the series. A second OVA episode was included with a Blu-ray Disc box set, released in Japan on June 24, 2015. Sentai Filmworks licensed the anime, and along with distributor Section23 Films, released the series on BD/DVD on July 26, 2011. Siren Visual licensed the anime for Australia and New Zealand. The series has also been licensed in the United Kingdom by Manga Entertainment and released the series on BD/DVD on June 25, 2012.

The series makes use of two pieces of theme music: one opening theme and one ending theme. The opening theme is "My Soul, Your Beats!" by Lia, and a remixed version sung by Yui (LiSA) was used for episode four. The ending theme is "Brave Song" by Aoi Tada. Several insert theme songs by the in-story band Girls Dead Monster are also used, featuring songs sung by Masami Iwasawa (Marina) and Yui (LiSA). These include: "Crow Song" (episode one), "Alchemy" and "My Song" (episode three), "Thousand Enemies" (episode five), and "Shine Days" and "Ichiban no Takaramono" (一番の宝物, My Most Precious Treasure) (episode 10). "Ichiban no Takaramono" is also used in episode 13 sung by Karuta.

== Episode list ==
No.	Title	Animation directors	Original release date
1	"Departure"	Katsuzō Hirata	April 3, 2010
Yuzuru Otonashi wakes up in the world of the afterlife with no recollection of his time while alive. Immediately, he meets Yuri Nakamura, while she aims a sniper rifle at the student council president, Angel. Yuri offers Otonashi to join the SSS against Angel, but Otonashi talks to Angel instead, who informs him that everyone is dead. Otonashi asks for proof, and then Angel impales him and he survives despite the mortal injury. The next day, he is cut a hundred times by Noda, and finally, he wakes up in the SSS room, where he meets the core SSS members. There, he joins the SSS, and Yuri briefs Otonashi that since they are in the afterlife, none of them can truly die but they can disappear if they start living a normal school life, which is why they resist Angel. Later that night, the SSS commences "Operation Tornado" to steal meal tickets from the "non-player characters" (NPCs). The girl band named Girls Dead Monster (GDM), affiliated with the SSS, performs inside the cafeteria to distract the NPCs, while some members fight against Angel. After the operation, the SSS retreats into the cafeteria and spends the meal tickets. At the meal, Otonashi tries to make sense of it all.
2	"Guild"	Kōsuke Kawazura	April 10, 2010
Low on supplies, Yuri leads nine other SSS members to the Guild far below the surface, where their allies make the weapons. Many booby traps guard the path to the Guild and the SSS finds them reactivated as Angel approaches the Guild. The group navigates through the traps, but in the end, only Yuri and Otonashi survive. During a short rest, Yuri divulges to Otonashi about the murder of her three younger siblings. This is Yuri's impetus to fight against the cruel fate God gave her. Soon after meeting the Guild members, Angel is close to the main entrance; Yuri orders to abandon the Guild, and the Guild leader, Chaa, opts to raze the Guild. In the meantime, Yuri and Otonashi fight Angel to buy enough time for the Guild members to set up some explosives and to escape to the old location. Yuri directs the Guild's reorganization, and Otonashi recognizes her leadership.
3	"My Song"	Yūko Iwaoka, Toshihisa Kaiya	April 17, 2010
Masami Iwasawa introduces a new ballad, "My Song", but Yuri questions its usefulness for SSS operations. Yuri introduces a new SSS member, Takeyama, who specializes in computer hacking. The next operation aims to infiltrate Angel's room and crack her computer's password. In the meantime, Girl's Dead Monster performs a concert to lure Angel. After meeting Yui, Otonashi talks with Iwasawa while the band takes a break. She reveals her history about her dysfunctional family, her pursuit of a music career, and how she died when she was struck in the head by her drunken father. Later on, GDM performs, while Yuri leads a small group to Angel's room. Several teachers subdue the concert, but Iwasawa breaks free and plays her ballad. After the song, she disappears from the afterlife. From the hacking, the SSS learn about the source of Angel's powers: she makes her weapons herself aided by software.
4	"Day Game"	Yūji Miyashita	April 24, 2010
Yui insists upon taking Iwasawa's place as the new vocalist, and after Yui accidentally kills herself during a tryout, Yuri leaves the decision to GDM. Yuri orders the SSS to form teams and participate in the upcoming baseball tournament. Hideki Hinata and Otonashi team up, but they fail to recruit key SSS members. Eventually, they recruit Yui, Shiina, Noda, and three female NPCs for an eight-person team. During the first round, the SSS teams beat the NPC teams, but soon each one loses to Angel's team composed of the school baseball team. Hinata's team ends up as the last SSS team in the final against Angel's team. In the last inning, Hinata faces a fly ball, which he dropped during his past life. Speculating his disappearance, Otonashi tries to stop him, but in retaliation, Yui grapples Hinata and prevents the catch. As a result, Angel's team wins, much to Yuri's frustration.
5	"Favorite Flavor"	Heo Gi Dong, Kōsuke Kawazura, Kensuke Shu	May 1, 2010
For the exams, Yuri wants to sabotage Angel's grades and reduce her school ranking grade-wise. During the operation, Otonashi introduces himself to Angel and gets her real name, Kanade Tachibana. The SSS members disrupt the class with a variety of idiotic distractions, which allows Takeyama to switch Kanade's exam sheets with fake ones. As a result, Kanade is replaced by the vice president Ayato Naoi for the council presidency. During another instance of "Operation Tornado", Kanade is surprisingly no longer hostile, ignores the commotion, and buys a meal ticket for mapo doufu. The operation blows Kanade's ticket away, and it falls to Otonashi. While eating Kanade's favorite dish, he sympathizes with her. Moments later, Naoi arrives with some NPCs and intends to punish the SSS for their constant disobedience.
6	"Family Affair"	Tadashi Hiramatsu	May 8, 2010
The SSS members are released from imprisonment, and Yuri orders class distractions to test Naoi's enforcement, though Naoi remains vigilant. Yuri discovers Naoi's misconduct of beating up NPCs to prevent his own disappearance. Otonashi asks Kanade to eat together in the cafeteria, but Naoi apprehends them for eating during an improper time and imprisons them in an underground cell . Kanade tells Otonashi that anyone who befriends her disappears. Via a walkie-talkie, Yuri informs Otonashi about her discoveries regarding Naoi and tells him that the SSS are fighting a losing battle against Naoi. Needing Kanade to fight, Otonashi convinces her to break out of their cell, but the SSS members have already been massacred by Naoi who used hypnosis-controlled NPCs as shields. Naoi attempts to hypnotize Yuri, but Otonashi stops him. As Otonashi embraces and acknowledges him, Naoi reveals his own unfair life as a replacement for his dead twin brother.
7	"Alive"	Yūko Iwaoka, Takehiko Matsumoto	May 15, 2010
Naoi joins the SSS, and Yuri asks him to use hypnosis to recover Otonashi's memories. Otonashi's life focused on his chronically hospitalized younger sister, Hatsune; her death; his fresh goal of attending medical school; and his premature accidental death during an earthquake. After some reflection with his renewed memories, he laments over the timing of his death and resumes his SSS membership with newly found motivation. With a shortage of meal tickets, Yuri orders a fishing expedition. Otonashi invites Kanade and after learning how to fish, she catches the Master of the Stream, a gigantic fish, big enough to feed the entire school. While serving the excess fish to the NPCs, Kanade and Otonashi promise to stay with the SSS. Suddenly a wounded Yuri collapses before them, accusing Angel of attacking her. Kanade, Otonashi and the others look up to see a second Angel with glaring red eyes standing atop a building.
8	"Dancer in the Dark"	Yūji Miyashita	May 22, 2010
The SSS defend against the aggressive red-eyed Kanade, but the fight ends with the two Kanades mutually stabbing each other. Yuri remembers one of Kanade's abilities, harmonics, which allows Kanade to clone herself. She orders the SSS to attend class to avoid self-obliteration, while she accesses Kanade's computer and adds additional steps to limit a clone's lifespan and reverse the harmonics. Yuri surmises that the original Kanade is being held down in the abandoned Guild and plans a rescue mission. Along the way the SSS members encounter more Angel clones, instead of Guild traps. As the team sacrifice themselves along the way to stop each clone, again Yuri and Otonashi are the only SSS members that remain. At Guild center, Yuri takes down the last clone, and Otonashi tells the very weak original Angel to activate her harmonics. She does, but the newly created clone informs Otonashi of the risk to Angel of fusing the consciousnesses of the clones back into her body. Then, Yuri's program activates and all of the clones painfully return to the original Angel.
9	"In Your Memory"	Kanami Sekiguchi	May 29, 2010
Waiting for Kanade to wake up, Otonashi falls asleep and dreams about the subway train accident. Trapped in the subway tunnel for a week, he led, helped, and inspired the survivors with the assistance of a man named Igarashi. In doing so, many of the victims survived, but Otonashi died moments before a rescue team arrived. When Kanade wakes him up, he becomes optimistic about his life and death, yet he remains in the afterlife. So from then onward, the two cooperate to help everyone move on from this afterlife, which was Kanade's goal all along. In turn, they realize the true nature of this afterlife: to give souls a chance to reconcile with past regrets. Afterwards, both Kanade and Naoi are reinstated to their previous positions: student council president and the vice president. The rest of the SSS assume Kanade has reverted to being red-eyed Angel, when that assertion is false.
10	"Goodbye Days"	Yuriko Ishii, Kōsuke Kawazura, Misaki Suzuki	June 5, 2010
Otonashi and Kanade decide upon Yui as the first one whom they help with their new goal. After a simple guitar-theft plan, Otonashi finds out about her life's paralysis and her list of wishes: executing a German suplex, scoring a soccer goal against five people, and scoring a home run. With some help, Otonashi helps her accomplish two of the three. After a couple of days, Yui gives up on the home run, but had fun with each activity. Yet, she had one special wish: marriage. Suddenly, Hinata declares that he would marry her, regardless of any handicap. Addressing the low random chance of meeting each other, Hinata describes their happy relationship, and thus Yui's wishes are fulfilled. After she disappears, Hinata joins Otonashi's goal of helping others moving on. In the meantime, Noda and Ōyama were attacked by a mysterious creature, which Yusa describes as a "shadow".
11	"Change the World"	Heo Gi Dong, Kōsuke Kawazura, Gi Nam Kim	June 12, 2010
While Hinata and Naoi compete over the role of Otonashi's main helper, a shadow monster suddenly attacks Naoi, and the other two destroy it. Yusa reports the encounter to Yuri, and Yuri has a meeting with Kanade to talk about the shadows, where Otonashi and company also attend. The meeting is cut short when a large shadow group surrounds Noda, Shiina, and TK. Everyone at the meeting jumps into the battle, and Yuri notices an NPC-to-shadow transformation. After the battle, Fujimaki reports the loss of Takamatsu to the shadows, but he is found the next day in class as a soulless NPC. To address this shadow situation, Yuri gathers a large SSS group, and she calls out Otonashi to share his idea about everyone passing on. Various members object, but Hinata and Naoi share his revelation. In a subsequent smaller meeting, Yuri enlists Kanade's help before she hunts down the source of the shadows. While the other SSS members consider their decision about passing on, Yuri learns about the theft of school computers and finds a hidden pathway from the computer room to the Guild.
12	"Knockin' on Heaven's Door"	Katsuzō Hirata, Eiyō Kuragawa	June 19, 2010
In the early morning, Kanade engages a large horde of shadows. A large group of SSS members with the GDM members decide to pass on, satisfied with their time together, and the main cast of SSS members fight on against increasing numbers of shadows. Meanwhile, Yuri heads for the Guild and encounters more shadows. Shiina tells Otonashi to separate, and both Hinata and Naoi follow. While dreaming of an ordinary classroom life, Yuri almost becomes an NPC just as the group with Otonashi and Kanade save her. They fight more shadows, and Yuri enters a hidden room, where the stolen computers are all running the Angel Player software. Also, Yuri finds an unknown boy there, and she questions him about various aspects of the afterlife. In the end, Yuri resists the temptation of becoming God and destroys all the computers. Afterwards, she dreams about her forgiving siblings, and in the infirmary, Otonashi and the three others look over her as she wakes up.
13	"Graduation"	Kōsuke Kawazura, Yūji Miyashita, Misaki Suzuki	June 26, 2010
Three days after the shadows incident, only Otonashi, Yuri, Kanade, Hinata, and Naoi remain; the others have passed on. Per Kanade's idea, they hold a graduation ceremony, complete with an anthem, diplomas, and a speech. At the ceremony's end, Naoi takes his leave; Yuri makes her peace with Kanade before she leaves; and Hinata follows shortly thereafter. Alone together, Otonashi suggests that he and Kanade remain, intending to help others who might enter the afterlife. He then confesses his love to her, but she reveals herself as the recipient of his transplanted heart. After declaring her gratitude to Otonashi, Kanade finally disappears, leaving him in frantic tears as he shouts Kanade's name. Finally, in an epilogue, a girl resembling Kanade is humming Iwasawa's "My Song" in the world of the living, and a boy resembling Otonashi passes by and recognizes the melody. When the girl walks onward, the boy moves to tap her shoulder. The scene fades to white just before he makes contact. Alternatively, in the BD/DVD-exclusive short "Another Epilogue", Otonashi remains in the afterlife and becomes the new student council president, helping out other students to pass on.
OVA–1	"Stairway to Heaven"	Kōsuke Kawazura, Yūji Miyashita, Misaki Suzuki	December 22, 2010
Set between episodes four and five, Yuri orders the SSS to pretend to enjoy the day with hyperactivity, as part of "Operation High Tension Syndrome". Yuri hopes that Angel would lead them straight to God, and failure of the operation results in a week-long fast. Everyone disperses with their fake enthusiasm, and a "tension meter" rates their excitement levels for every activity and outburst. Eventually when gathered up, they have a sports festival, involving the NPCs too. Meanwhile, Yuri oversees the whole operation, until Angel wanders in to intervene after Shiina's interruption. Angel moves on to "report", and the SSS follow her to an underground greenhouse, which they assumed housed God. Instead, they find an ordinary garden, tended by Angel. Vexed, Yuri imposes the fast and ends up starving the SSS.
OVA–2	"Hell's Kitchen"	Yūji Miyashita	June 24, 2015
Set between episodes two and three during Golden Week, Yuri arranges for the SSS to go on a deadly picnic, which involves most of the members trying to kill each other with various traps and gadgets. Sensing an opportunity, Girls Dead Monster members Irie and Sekine conspire to kill Iwasawa and seize control of the band from her. As the boys largely fall victim to various traps, leaving just Otonashi alive, Irie and Sekine attempt to lead Iwasawa into various pitfalls, but she survives each one while remaining completely oblivious. With Shiina's help, they attempt to use their last trap, a dreadful concoction of raw liver, but it instead lands on Hisako, who transforms into a bloodthirsty monster that not even Angel can stop. Sometime later, Irie and Sekine explain the events of the picnic to Yui and how they inspired the band to take on their current name.
