= Graduation (disambiguation) =

Graduation is the act of receiving or conferring an academic degree, or the associated ceremony.

Graduation may also refer to:

- Graduation (scale), the marking of units on a scale such as on a slide rule or instrument

== Literature ==
- Graduation (1915), a novel by Irene R. McLeod
- Final Friends 3: The Graduation (1989), a novel by Christopher Pike
- Graduation: A Time for Change (2001), a For Better or For Worse strip collection by Lynn Johnston

== Film and television ==
=== Films ===
- Graduation (2007 film), an American film starring Chris Marquette and Riley Smith
- Graduation (2016 film), a Romanian film by Cristian Mungiu

=== Television episodes ===
- "Graduation" (13 Reasons Why)
- "Graduation" (Boy Meets World)
- "Graduation" (Kim Possible)
- "Graduation" (Malcolm in the Middle)
- "Graduation" (Roswell)
- "Graduation" (The Suite Life of Zack & Cody)
- "Graduation", a 2010 episode of Angel Beats!
- "The Graduation", a 2019 episode of Good Witch
- "Mission 3: The Graduation", a 2019 episode of Snoopy in Space

== Music ==
=== Albums ===
- Graduation (album), by Kanye West, 2007
- Graduation (Broccoli, You Too? album), 2010
- Graduation (Deen album), 2011
- Graduation: Singles, an album by Nami Tamaki, 2006
- The Graduation, a mixtape by Brianna Perry, 2009

=== Songs ===
- "Graduation" (Benny Blanco and Juice Wrld song), 2019
- "Graduation (Friends Forever)", a song by Vitamin C, 2000
- "Graduation", a song by Two-Mix from Fantastix II Next, 1998
- "Graduation", a song by U-ka Saegusa in dB from Secret & Lies, 2003
- "Graduation", a song by Claris from Birthday, 2012
- "Graduation", a song by Scandal from Hello World, 2014
- "Graduation", a song by Kero Kero Bonito from Bonito Generation, 2016
- "Graduation", a song by Haon, 2018
- "Graduation", a song by Eric Chou, 2022
- "Graduation", a song by NCT Dream from Candy, 2022

=== Other uses ===
- Graduation, in Japanese idol culture, a final concert performance for a member leaving a group

== See also ==
- Graduation Day (disambiguation)
- Gradation (disambiguation)
- Graduate (disambiguation)
