= Angel Beats! 1st Beat =

- Video game cover, featuring (clockwise from left) Angel (Kanade Tachibana), Masami Iwasawa, Matsushita, Yui, and Yuri Nakamura
- Developer: Key
- Publisher: Visual Arts
- Designer: Jun Maeda
- Artists: Na-Ga; Nazuki Fuei; Yūnon Nagayama; Juri Sakuraba; Falco Suzuki
- Writers: Jun Maeda; Kai; Leo Kashida
- Composers: Jun Maeda; Anant-Garde Eyes
- Series: Angel Beats!
- Platform: Microsoft Windows
- Release: JP: June 26, 2015
- Genre: Visual novel
- Mode: Single-player

Angel Beats! 1st Beat is a Japanese visual novel developed by Key, a brand of Visual Arts. It was released on June 26, 2015, for Windows and is rated for all ages. The game is based on the 2010 anime television series Angel Beats!, originally conceived by Jun Maeda, and also adapts scenes featured in the anime. The story takes place in the afterlife and focuses on Otonashi, a boy who lost his memories of his life after dying. He is enrolled in the afterlife school and meets a girl named Yuri, who invites him to join the Afterlife Battlefront—an organization she leads that fights against God. The Battlefront fights against the student council president Angel, a girl with supernatural powers.

The gameplay in Angel Beats! follows an interactive branching plot line with multiple scenarios. Originally meant to be a role-playing game, Maeda eventually conceded to making it into a visual novel adventure game. When designing the game, Maeda did not want to include choices for the player that would not have a meaningful effect, so the choices given were focused on affecting the plot and character interactions. A reviewer noted that its game structure makes it feel more like a game compared to other adventure games released around the same time, which have fewer choices available to the player and less-divergent plot lines. 1st Beat ranked as the best-selling PC game sold in Japan at the time of its release, and charted in the national top 50 twice more after that.

== Plot ==
=== Setting and gameplay ===
Angel Beats! is set in a world after death, which acts as a limbo where the dead learn to give up any lingering attachments from life before passing on. Those in this limbo can eat, feel pain, and can even die again, only to awaken later with no injuries. Objects not originally present in this world can be created from dirt depending on the familiarity of it when alive. In the case of weapons, this can range from simple melee weapons to more complex firearms and explosives. In addition, computer programs can be used to create a mixed reality, as when Kanade creates her supernatural powers via a program called Angel Player.

Text in Angel Beats! is displayed in a dialog box, here depicting the player character talking with Iwasawa, Yuri and Yusa (respectively).

As a supernatural visual novel, the player assumes the role of Yuzuru Otonashi. Much of its gameplay is spent on reading the story's narrative and dialogue. The text in the game is accompanied by character sprites, which represent who Otonashi is talking to, over background art. Throughout the game, the player encounters CG artwork at certain points in the story, which takes the place of the background art and character sprites. Angel Beats! follows a branching plot line with multiple endings, and depending on the decisions that the player makes during the game, the plot will progress in a specific direction.

It has three plot lines for the characters Yui, Masami Iwasawa, and Matsushita. Throughout gameplay, the player is given multiple options to choose from, and text progression pauses at these points until a choice is made. To view all plot lines in their entirety, the player will have to replay the game multiple times and choose different choices to further the plot to an alternate direction. A map feature is also included, allowing the player to interact with the character in whatever order they choose. The game includes 200 hidden achievements.

=== Story ===
The protagonist Otonashi and the other characters are students at a high school populated by a large number of "normal" students and teachers referred to as "non-player characters" who are not human, but look and act the part. Inside the school, the characters often gather in the principal's office—headquarters of the Afterlife Battlefront (死んだ世界戦線, Shinda Sekai Sensen; (SSS)), an organization which fights against God for the cruel fates the SSS members experienced in life. In the SSS, there is an all-female band named Girls Dead Monster that acts as a diversion during missions, and a subterranean organization called the Guild that mass-produces weapons and supplies them to the SSS.

Otonashi is asked to join the SSS by its founder and leader, Yuri Nakamura. The SSS fight against Kanade Tachibana, also referred to as Angel, the student council president of the afterlife school, whose responsibilities require her to suppress the team's disruptive activities. Although the SSS initially views Kanade as their enemy, Otonashi eventually befriends her and she joins the SSS. Following this, Otonashi begins helping the other SSS members overcome any regrets they had in life so they can move on. In the process, Otonashi grows closer to the other characters as he learns more about them. Although the story contains romantic plot lines between Otonashi and each of the heroines, the pasts and conflicts of the characters are not meant to simply enliven the romantic elements, but also provide a significance that goes beyond romance.

== Development and release ==
Following the conclusion of the Angel Beats! anime television series in June 2010, Jun Maeda mentioned during a lecture at Kyoto University in November 2010 that he started writing the scenario for a possible video game adaptation. Maeda continued to develop the project, although he prioritized other work he was involved in at the time, which led to the game's announcement in September 2013. Takahiro Baba, the president of Visual Arts, initially conceived it to be an episodic video game released in multiple volumes, despite Maeda's misgivings and opposition to the idea, but Baba said he would take responsibility for any criticism from fans. One of the reasons for multiple volumes was the large number of characters and scale of Angel Beats!'s story; Baba thought it would take at least five years to complete if they waited to release it as a single game. Baba also felt that an overly long play time could be avoided by dividing the game into multiple volumes.

Maeda led the production team as the game designer and one of the scenario writers. Two additional writers included Kai, who previously contributed on the scenario of Key's 2004 game Clannad, and Leo Kashida, who had worked on the scenario of Key's 2005 game Tomoyo After: It's a Wonderful Life and 2007 game Little Busters!. In addition to each writer being in charge of certain characters' scenarios, Maeda also supplemented the scenarios written by Kai and Kashida by leading the writing in a collaborative effort. In designing the game's branching plot line and the choices the player can make, Maeda did not want to include choices for the player that would not have a meaningful effect, so the choices given were designed to affect the plot and character interactions. Primarily based on the Angel Beats! anime, 1st Beat covers up to the ninth episode of the anime, including content unique to the game, before diverging into the individual character routes. The plot was designed to diverge during both special event scenes accompanied by CG artwork and normal scenes before converging again. Maeda originally wanted to make Angel Beats! a role-playing game as opposed to a visual novel adventure game. Maeda also felt that it should have been released first on the PlayStation Vita.

Na-Ga, who had previously provided the original character designs for the Angel Beats! anime, also created the designs for characters introduced in the game, as well as some of the character art. Several other artists worked under Na-Ga's supervision to initially decrease the release time between subsequent volumes, including: Nazuki Fuei, Yūnon Nagayama, Juri Sakuraba and Falco Suzuki. Much of the focus on 1st Beat is on a large amount of CG artwork, which has about as many CGs as Clannad according to Baba, which he found odd. Rated for all ages and initially intended to be split into six volumes, Baba had aimed for a release schedule between the volumes to be about six months. The first volume was planned to have the most content, and installing subsequent volumes onto the same computer would have overwritten certain scenes in 1st Beat. However, in the afterword of the 11th volume of Angel Beats! Heaven's Door released in December 2016, Maeda revealed that subsequent volumes had been cancelled, with the content that had been planned for future games used as a basis for the manga Angel Beats! The Last Operation.

A free demo of 1st Beat became available for download at Key's official website on May 15, 2015. While 1st Beat was originally planned to be released on May 29, 2015, the game was later released on June 26, 2015, as a limited-edition version for Windows. The limited edition came bundled with a 36-page official guide book titled Shinda Sekai Sensen Katsudō Hōkokusho (死んだ世界戦線活動報告書, Afterlife Battlefront Activity Report), a music album titled Holy, a CD containing exclusive recordings of the Internet radio show Angel Beats! SSS Radio, a rubber coaster, three rare cards from the mobile game Angel Beats! Operation Wars, and one promotional card each from the Weiß Schwarz and ChaosTCG trading card games. A game patch for 1st Beat was released on July 10, 2015. An official English version of 1st Beat was considered in 2016, but never confirmed.

=== Music ===
The music featured in the visual novel is taken from two albums and two singles originally released for the anime: the Angel Beats! Original Soundtrack, Keep The Beats!, "Crow Song" and "Last Song". Angel Beats! 1st Beat has three pieces of theme music: one opening theme and two ending themes. The opening theme is "Heartily Song" by Lia. The first ending theme is "Subete no Owari no Hajimari" (すべての終わりの始まり) by Suzuyu, and it is used for Iwasawa's and Matsushita's scenarios. The second ending theme is "Ichiban no Takaramono (Yui ver.)" (一番の宝物) by LiSA, and it is used for Yui's route. 1st Beat also contains six insert songs: "Crow Song", "Hot Meal", "Alchemy" and "My Song" by Marina; and "Thousand Enemies" and "My Soul, Your Beats! (Gldemo Ver.)" by LiSA. The single containing both "Heartily Song" and "Subete no Owari no Hajimari" was released on April 1, 2015. Those who pre-ordered the limited edition of 1st Beat received an exclusive single titled "Million Star" by Girls Dead Monster. An album of piano arrangements of the game's soundtrack titled Holy came bundled with the limited-edition release of 1st Beat on June 26, 2015.

== Reception ==
In 2015, Angel Beats! 1st Beat ranked four times in the top ten in national PC game pre-orders in Japan. The rankings were at No. 7 in February, No. 5 in March, and twice at No. 1 in April and May. 1st Beat ranked first in terms of national sales of PC games in Japan in June 2015, and ranked again in the top 50 highest selling PC games in Japan at No. 5 in July and at No. 20 in August 2015. The Japanese video game magazine PCpress reported that 1st Beat sold the most of any PC game in Japan for the first half of 2015. 1st Beat premiered as the No. 1 game sold on Getchu.com, a major redistributor of visual novel and domestic anime products, during the month of its release, and at No. 12 in July. The game would go on to be the No. 4 game sold for the first half of 2015 on Getchu.com.

In a review on Famitsu.com by Taiga Asaba, Angel Beats! 1st Beat is described as not merely complementing the anime it is based on, but instead using the characters and setting to produce a wholly new story, which creates a separate charm surrounding the separate versions of the story. Asaba notes that the theme revolving around family already present in the anime is expanded upon in the game for each of the characters. Regarding the game's mechanics, Asaba found it fairly difficult to go down specific character routes, noting that a small change in how to diverge the plot line results in large changes to the characters. Asaba writes that its game structure makes it feel more like a game compared to other adventure games released around the same time, which have fewer choices available to the player and less-divergent plot lines.
