= Music of Charlotte =

Charlotte discography
- Studio albums: 2
- Soundtrack albums: 1
- Singles: 3

Charlotte is a 13-episode 2015 anime television series produced by P.A. Works and Aniplex and directed by Yoshiyuki Asai. The story was originally conceived by Jun Maeda, who also wrote the screenplay and composed the music with Hikarishuyo and the group Anant-Garde Eyes; Na-Ga provided the original character design. Both Maeda and Na-Ga are from the visual novel brand Key. The discography of Charlotte consists of two studio albums, three singles and one soundtrack.

The core of the discography is the original soundtrack album produced by Key Sounds Label in 2015. The music on the soundtrack was composed and arranged by Jun Maeda and members of Anant-Garde Eyes. There are two in-story bands: How-Low-Hello featuring vocals by Maaya Uchida, and Zhiend featuring vocals by Marina. One album and one single were released for both bands in 2015. A theme song single was also released in 2015.

== Albums ==
=== Smells Like Tea, Espresso ===
Smells Like Tea, Espresso is a studio album by How-Low-Hello released on September 30, 2015, in Japan by Key Sounds Label bearing the catalog number KSLA-0107. The album contains one disc with 12 tracks sung by Maaya Uchida. The album is composed by Jun Maeda and arranged by Tomohiro Takeshita. The song "Hand with Blood" is a re-arrangement of Maeda's 2003 song "Spica".

All tracks are written by Jun Maeda.

Track listing
No.	Title	Length
1.	"Hatsunetsu Days" (発熱デイズ)	5:05
2.	"Real"	4:21
3.	"Singer Days" (シンガーデイズ)	4:55
4.	"Keep on Burnin'"	5:18
5.	"Hashire" (走れ)	4:38
6.	"Dancin' on the Border"	3:22
7.	"Miwaku no Beam" (魅惑のビーム)	4:32
8.	"Hand with Blood"	5:02
9.	"Rakuen Made" (楽園まで)	4:26
10.	"Tabibito" (旅人)	6:54
11.	"Bravely You (How-Low-Hello Ver.)"	5:22
12.	"Yakeochinai Tsubasa (How-Low-Hello Ver.)" (灼け落ちない翼)	5:04
Total length:		58:59

=== Echo ===
Echo is a studio album by Zhiend released on October 14, 2015, in Japan by Key Sounds Label bearing the catalog numbers KSLA-0108–0109. The album contains two discs with 12 tracks each sung by Marina. While the music on both discs is the same, the lyrics are different: one has English lyrics and the other has Japanese lyrics. The album is composed and arranged by Hikarishuyo, with lyrics written by Jun Maeda.

All lyrics are written by Jun Maeda; all music is composed by Hikarishuyo.

Disc 1
No.	Title	Length
1.	"Blood Colour"	5:09
2.	"Scar on Face"	6:00
3.	"Fallin'"	5:11
4.	"Sinking Ships"	5:10
5.	"Ray of Light"	4:12
6.	"Heavy Rain"	6:11
7.	"Vanishing Day"	5:00
8.	"Trigger"	3:51
9.	"Adore"	5:35
10.	"Clouded Sky"	6:36
11.	"Live for You"	5:29
12.	"Feedback"	1:23

Disc 2
No.	Title	Length
1.	"Blood Colour (Japanese ver.)"	5:09
2.	"Scar on Face (Japanese ver.)"	6:00
3.	"Fallin' (Japanese ver.)"	5:11
4.	"Sinking Ships (Japanese ver.)"	5:10
5.	"Ray of Light (Japanese ver.)"	4:12
6.	"Heavy Rain (Japanese ver.)"	6:11
7.	"Vanishing Day (Japanese ver.)"	5:00
8.	"Trigger (Japanese ver.)"	3:51
9.	"Adore (Japanese ver.)"	5:35
10.	"Clouded Sky (Japanese ver.)"	6:36
11.	"Live for You (Japanese ver.)"	5:29
12.	"Feedback"	1:23
Total length:		119:34

=== Charlotte Original Soundtrack ===
The Charlotte Original Soundtrack was released on November 4, 2015 in Japan by Key Sounds Label bearing the catalog numbers KSLA-0110–0111. The album contains two discs composed and produced by Jun Maeda and members of Anant-Garde Eyes. All of the tracks were arranged by Anant-Garde Eyes.

All music is composed by Anant-Garde Eyes, except where noted.

Disc 1
No.	Title	Length
1.	"Bravely You" (Composition and lyrics by Jun Maeda; Performed by Lia)	5:31
2.	"Ibitsu" (歪)	1:44
3.	"Omoi" (想い)	2:22
4.	"Asa" (朝)	2:17
5.	"Danran" (団欒)	2:05
6.	"Warudakumi" (悪巧み)	1:54
7.	"Cunning Ma" (カンニング魔)	1:30
8.	"Meeting" (ミーティング)	2:19
9.	"Impact" (インパクト)	2:10
10.	"Mōtsui" (猛追)	2:16
11.	"Yūki" (勇気) (Composition by Jun Maeda)	2:35
12.	"Katsudō Nisshi" (活動日誌) (Composition by Jun Maeda)	2:15
13.	"Break Time" (ブレイクタイム)	2:13
14.	"Nōryokushatachi" (能力者たち)	2:25
15.	"Kizuna" (絆)	2:00
16.	"Heion" (平穏)	1:49
17.	"Booby Trap" (ブービートラップ)	1:45
18.	"Orokamonotachi" (愚か者たち)	2:20
19.	"Datsurakushatachi" (脱落者たち)	1:59
20.	"Deochi" (出落ち)	1:55
21.	"Kyōryokusha" (協力者)	0:51
22.	"Omajinai" (おまじない)	1:38
23.	"Arakuremono" (荒くれ者)	1:08
24.	"Shikku" (疾駆)	1:47
25.	"An'un" (暗雲)	2:38
26.	"Control" (コントロール)	2:01
27.	"Owaru Yume" (終わる夢 (Composition by Jun Maeda)	2:27

Disc 2
No.	Title	Length
1.	"Movement" (ムーブメント)	1:48
2.	"High Tension" (ハイテンション)	1:47
3.	"Ihyō" (意表)	2:04
4.	"Shōbu" (勝負)	2:18
5.	"Surechigai" (すれ違い)	2:38
6.	"Munasawagi" (胸騒ぎ)	2:46
7.	"Miminari" (耳鳴り)	3:09
8.	"Taiji" (対峙)	2:02
9.	"Tasogare" (黄昏)	1:39
10.	"Muchū" (霧中)	2:49
11.	"Ginen" (疑念)	3:04
12.	"Ryakudatsu" (略奪)	2:20
13.	"Hōkai" (崩壊)	2:04
14.	"Haru no Hi" (春の日) (Composition by Jun Maeda)	3:02
15.	"Fuon" (不穏)	2:25
16.	"Loop" (ループ)	2:48
17.	"Kisaku" (奇策)	2:51
18.	"Zetsubō" (絶望)	2:29
19.	"Ketsui" (決意)	2:34
20.	"Kokuhaku" (告白)	3:00
21.	"Kiki" (危機)	2:38
22.	"Shinigami" (死神)	3:38
23.	"Kimi no Moji" (君の文字) (Composition and lyrics by Jun Maeda; Performed by Anri Kumaki)	5:55
24.	"Yakeochinai Tsubasa" (灼け落ちない翼) (Composition and lyrics by Jun Maeda; Performed by Aoi Tada)	5:15
Total length:		124:57

== Singles ==
=== Bravely You / Yakeochinai Tsubasa ===
"Bravely You / Yakeochinai Tsubasa" (灼け落ちない翼) is a split single released on August 26, 2015, in Japan by Key Sounds Label bearing the catalog numbers KSLA-0103 (limited edition) and KSLA-0104 (regular edition). The two title tracks, performed by Lia and Aoi Tada respectively, were used as opening and ending themes to the Charlotte anime series. Each song is presented in full length, TV size, and instrumental versions. The single is written by Jun Maeda and arranged by the group Anant-Garde Eyes. The limited edition contained a bonus DVD containing a no-credit version of the opening and ending animation sequences used in the anime.

All tracks are written by Jun Maeda.

Track listing
No.	Title	Artist	Length
1.	"Bravely You"	Lia	5:28
2.	"Yakeochinai Tsubasa" (灼け落ちない翼)	Aoi Tada	5:15
3.	"Bravely You (TV Size)"	Lia	1:33
4.	"Yakeochinai Tsubasa (TV Size)" (灼け落ちない翼)	Aoi Tada	1:35
5.	"Bravely You (Instrumental)"		5:28
6.	"Yakeochinai Tsubasa (Instrumental)" (灼け落ちない翼)		5:13
Total length:			24:32

=== Rakuen Made / Hatsunetsu Days ===
"Rakuen Made / Hatsunetsu Days" (楽園まで/発熱デイズ) is a single by How-Low-Hello, featuring songs sung by Maaya Uchida, released on September 2, 2015, in Japan by Key Sounds Label bearing the catalog number KSLA-0105. The single is composed by Jun Maeda and arranged by Tomohiro Takeshita.

All tracks are written by Jun Maeda.

Track listing
No.	Title	Length
1.	"Rakuen Made" (楽園まで)	4:23
2.	"Hatsunetsu Days" (発熱デイズ)	5:04
3.	"Not be found"	4:43
Total length:		14:10

=== Trigger ===
"Trigger" is a single by Zhiend, featuring songs sung by Marina, released on September 9, 2015, in Japan by Key Sounds Label bearing the catalog number KSLA-0106. The single is composed and arranged by Hikarishuyo, with lyrics written by Jun Maeda.

All lyrics are written by Jun Maeda; all music is composed by Hikarishuyo.

Track listing
No.	Title	Length
1.	"Trigger"	3:49
2.	"Fallin'"	5:10
3.	"Let's feel Good"	6:23
4.	"Trigger (Japanese ver.)"	3:48
5.	"Fallin' (Japanese ver.)"	5:10
6.	"Let's feel Good (Japanese ver.)"	6:20
Total length:		30:40

== Charts ==
Albums	Release date	Label	Format	Peak Oricon chart positions
"Bravely You / Yakeochinai Tsubasa"	August 26, 2015	Key Sounds Label (KSLA-0103 and KSLA-0104)	CD, CD+DVD	4
"Rakuen Made / Hatsunetsu Days"	September 2, 2015	Key Sounds Label (KSLA-0105)	CD	9
"Trigger"	September 9, 2015	Key Sounds Label (KSLA-0106)	CD	11
Smells Like Tea, Espresso	September 30, 2015	Key Sounds Label (KSLA-0107)	CD	12
Echo	October 14, 2015	Key Sounds Label (KSLA-0108–0109)	CD	4
Charlotte Original Soundtrack	November 4, 2015	Key Sounds Label (KSLA-0110–0111)	CD	9
