= Music of Angel Beats! =

Angel Beats! discography
- Studio albums: 2
- Soundtrack albums: 1
- Compilation albums: 1
- Singles: 9
- Remixes: 1

Angel Beats! is a 13-episode 2010 anime television series produced by P.A. Works and Aniplex and directed by Seiji Kishi. The story was originally conceived by Jun Maeda, who also wrote the screenplay and composed the music with the group Anant-Garde Eyes, with original character design by Na-Ga; both Maeda and Na-Ga are from the visual novel brand Key. The first volume in a six-part episodic visual novel adaptation produced by Key was released in 2015. The discography of Angel Beats! consists of two studio albums, one compilation album, nine singles, one soundtrack and one remix album.

The core of the discography is the original soundtrack album produced by Key Sounds Label in 2010. The music on the soundtrack was composed and arranged by Jun Maeda and members of Anant-Garde Eyes. One album and five singles for the in-story band Girls Dead Monster were released in 2010 featuring songs performed by Lisa and Marina. A theme song single was also released in 2010. A Girls Dead Monster mini-album was released in 2014. A theme song single for the visual novel version was released in 2015. Another single for Girls Dead Monster and a piano arrange album were also released in 2015. A compilation album containing previously released vocal tracks was released in 2016. Another single for Girls Dead Monster was released in 2021.

== Albums ==
=== Keep The Beats! ===
Keep The Beats! is a studio album by Girls Dead Monster released on June 30, 2010, in Japan by Key Sounds Label bearing the catalog number KSLA-0058. A version of Keep The Beats! containing instrumental tracks was released on July 28, 2010, bundled with a 256-page band score book. The album contains one disc with 13 tracks sung by Yui (Lisa). The album is composed by Jun Maeda and arranged by Hikarishuyo.

All tracks are written by Jun Maeda.

Track listing
No.	Title	Length
1.	"Crow Song (Yui Ver.)"	4:04
2.	"Thousand Enemies"	4:48
3.	"Shine Days"	4:56
4.	"23:50"	4:21
5.	"Run With Wolves"	4:05
6.	"Morning Dreamer"	3:47
7.	"Rain Song"	4:57
8.	"Alchemy (Yui Ver.)"	4:16
9.	"Ichiban no Takaramono (Yui ver.)" (一番の宝物)	6:00
10.	"Little Braver (Album Ver.)"	4:57
11.	"My Song (Yui Ver.)"	5:09
12.	"My Soul, Your Beats! (Gldemo Ver.)"	4:45
13.	"Brave Song (Gldemo Ver.)"	5:40
Total length:		61:45

=== Angel Beats! Original Soundtrack ===
The Angel Beats! Original Soundtrack was released on July 28, 2010, in Japan by Key Sounds Label bearing the catalog numbers KSLA-0059—0060. The soundtrack contains two discs totaling 47 tracks composed and produced by Jun Maeda and members of Anant-Garde Eyes. All of the tracks were arranged by Anant-Garde Eyes. Three artists provide vocals for three songs: Lia sings "My Soul, Your Beats!", Karuta sings "Ichiban no Takaramono (Original Version)", and Aoi Tada sings "Brave Song".

All music is composed by Anant-Garde Eyes, except where noted.

Disc 1
No.	Title	Length
1.	"My Soul, Your Beats!" (Composition and lyrics by Jun Maeda; Performed by Lia)	4:35
2.	"Theme of SSS"	1:52
3.	"School Days"	2:21
4.	"Girl's Hop"	2:12
5.	"Art of War"	1:35
6.	"Today Is OK"	3:52
7.	"Memory"	1:33
8.	"My Most Precious Treasure" (Composition by Jun Maeda)	2:47
9.	"Tactics"	1:32
10.	"Enemy Country"	2:12
11.	"Operation Start"	2:19
12.	"Decisive Battle"	1:39
13.	"Attack!!"	1:49
14.	"Critical Point"	1:12
15.	"Study Time"	1:38
16.	"Niku Udon"	2:04
17.	"Invention"	1:08
18.	"Toy of Spring"	1:46
19.	"Deochi!"	1:34
20.	"Light Drop"	2:00
21.	"Worthy Rival"	2:06
22.	"Burial"	2:48
23.	"Play Ball"	2:47
24.	"Walkure"	0:30
25.	"Let's Operation"	2:00
26.	"Evening Breeze"	1:36
27.	"Moment of Rest"	2:12

Disc 2
No.	Title	Length
1.	"Initial Impulse"	1:14
2.	"My Heart" (Composition by Jun Maeda)	2:49
3.	"Soul Friends" (Composition by Jun Maeda)	2:56
4.	"Kanade" (Composition by Jun Maeda)	3:03
5.	"My Most Precious Treasure (orgel)" (Composition by Jun Maeda)	2:21
6.	"Memory (orgel)"	1:33
7.	"Unjust Life"	2:45
8.	"Nocturne in the Afternoon"	1:39
9.	"Anxiety"	1:49
10.	"Abyss"	3:16
11.	"Alter Ego"	1:50
12.	"Siren"	1:54
13.	"Transforms to the Shadow"	2:25
14.	"Otonashi"	1:40
15.	"Angel's Flight"	1:16
16.	"Firing Preparation"	2:14
17.	"Desperation"	2:33
18.	"Breakthrough"	3:08
19.	"Ichiban no Takaramono (Original Version)" (一番の宝物) (Composition and lyrics by Jun Maeda; Performed by Karuta)	5:59
20.	"Brave Song" (Composition and lyrics by Jun Maeda; Performed by Aoi Tada)	5:37
Total length:		107:40

=== Rare Tracks ===
Rare Tracks is a mini studio album by Girls Dead Monster released on December 28, 2014, in Japan by Key Sounds Label bearing the catalog number KSLA-0098. The album contains one disc with three tracks sung by Marina. The album is composed by Jun Maeda and arranged by Hikarishuyo.

All tracks are written by Jun Maeda.

Track listing
No.	Title	Length
1.	"Crow Song"	4:38
2.	"Alchemy"	4:42
3.	"Hot Meal"	4:47
Total length:		14:07

=== Holy ===
Holy is a piano arrange album with songs taken from the Angel Beats! anime and visual novel and arranged into piano versions. This album was released as a bonus item included with the limited edition first printing of the Windows version of Angel Beats! 1st Beat released on June 26, 2015, by Key Sounds Label bearing the catalog number KSLA-0102. As a result, it was not released for individual sale. The album contains one disc with eight tracks remixed by Ryō Mizutsuki. The album is otherwise composed and produced by Jun Maeda and Anant-Garde Eyes.

Track listing
No.	Title	Music	Length
1.	"My Soul, Your Beats! (Piano Arrange Ver.)"	Jun Maeda	6:32
2.	"Girl's Hop (Piano Arrange Ver.)"	Anant-Garde Eyes	2:53
3.	"Evening Breeze (Piano Arrange Ver.)"	Anant-Garde Eyes	4:00
4.	"Theme of SSS (Piano Arrange Ver.)"	Anant-Garde Eyes	3:30
5.	"Memory (Piano Arrange Ver.)"	Anant-Garde Eyes	3:58
6.	"'Burial' as Barcarolle (Burial yori)" ("burial" as Barcarolle (burialより)	Anant-Garde Eyes	4:37
7.	"Ichiban no Takaramono (Ichiban no Takaramono yori)" (いちばんのたからもの (一番の宝物より))	Jun Maeda	5:27
8.	"Brave Song (Piano Arrange Ver.)"	Jun Maeda	7:15
Total length:			38:12

=== Angel Beats! Perfect Vocal Collection ===
Angel Beats! Perfect Vocal Collection is a compilation album of vocal music featured in the Angel Beats! anime and visual novel. It was first released on May 1, 2016, at the Character1 exhibition in Japan by Key Sounds Label bearing the catalog numbers KSLA-0113–0115. The album contains three discs with 34 tracks composed, arranged, and produced by Jun Maeda, Tomohiro Takeshita, Hikarishuyo and the group Anant-Garde Eyes. Singers on the album include: Karuta, Lia, Yui (LiSA), Masami Iwasawa (Marina), Suzuyu and Aoi Tada.

All tracks are written by Jun Maeda, except where noted.

Disc 1
No.	Title	Artist / Arrangement	Length
1.	"Crow Song"	Masami Iwasawa (Marina) / Hikarishuyo	4:08
2.	"Alchemy"	Masami Iwasawa (Marina) / Hikarishuyo	4:16
3.	"My Song"	Masami Iwasawa (Marina) / Hikarishuyo	4:53
4.	"Last Song"	Masami Iwasawa (Marina) / Hikarishuyo	5:36
5.	"Hot Meal (Another "Thousand Enemies")"	Masami Iwasawa (Marina) / Hikarishuyo	4:57
6.	"Million Star"	Masami Iwasawa (Marina) / Hikarishuyo	4:53
7.	"Hungry Song"	Masami Iwasawa (Marina) / Hikarishuyo	4:47
8.	"God Bless You"	Masami Iwasawa (Marina) / Hikarishuyo	10:32
9.	"Crow Song (Acoustic)"	Masami Iwasawa (Marina) / Hikarishuyo	4:38
10.	"Alchemy (Acoustic)"	Masami Iwasawa (Marina) / Hikarishuyo	4:42
11.	"Hot Meal (Acoustic)"	Masami Iwasawa (Marina) / Hikarishuyo	4:47

Disc 2
No.	Title	Artist / Arrangement	Length
1.	"Crow Song (Yui ver.)"	Yui (LiSA) / Hikarishuyo	4:04
2.	"Thousand Enemies"	Yui (LiSA) / Hikarishuyo	4:48
3.	"Shine Days"	Yui (LiSA) / Hikarishuyo	4:56
4.	"23:50"	Yui (LiSA) / Hikarishuyo	4:21
5.	"Run with Wolves"	Yui (LiSA) / Hikarishuyo	4:05
6.	"Morning Dreamer"	Yui (LiSA) / Hikarishuyo	3:47
7.	"Rain Song"	Yui (LiSA) / Hikarishuyo	4:57
8.	"Alchemy (Yui ver.)"	Yui (LiSA) / Hikarishuyo	4:16
9.	"Ichiban no Takaramono (Yui ver.)" (一番の宝物)	Yui (LiSA) / Hikarishuyo	6:00
10.	"Little Braver (Album ver.)"	Yui (LiSA) / Hikarishuyo	4:57
11.	"My Song (Yui ver.)"	Yui (LiSA) / Hikarishuyo	5:09
12.	"Answer Song"	Yui (LiSA) / Hikarishuyo	5:34
13.	"Day Game"	Yui (LiSA) / Hikarishuyo	4:53
14.	"Storm Song"	Yui (LiSA) / Hikarishuyo	4:13
15.	"Highest Life"	Yui (LiSA) / Hikarishuyo	6:26

Disc 3
No.	Title	Artist / Arrangement	Length
1.	"My Soul, Your Beats!"	Lia / Anant-Garde Eyes	4:35
2.	"Brave Song"	Aoi Tada / Anant-Garde Eyes	5:25
3.	"Ichiban no Takaramono (Original Version)" (一番の宝物)	Karuta / Anant-Garde Eyes	5:59
4.	"Heartily Song"	Lia / Anant-Garde Eyes	5:19
5.	"Subete no Owari no Hajimari" (すべての終わりの始まり The Start of the End of It All) (Composed by Tomohiro Takeshita)	Suzuyu / Anant-Garde Eyes	5:54
6.	"Ichiban no Takaramono (Yui final ver.)" (一番の宝物)	Yui (LiSA) / Hikarishuyo	6:08
7.	"My Soul, Your Beats! (Gldemo ver.)"	Yui (LiSA) / Hikarishuyo	4:45
8.	"Brave Song (Gldemo ver.)"	Yui (LiSA) / Hikarishuyo	5:40
Total length:			174:20

== Singles ==
=== Crow Song ===
"Crow Song" is a single by Girls Dead Monster, featuring songs sung by Masami Iwasawa (Marina), released on April 23, 2010, in Japan by Key Sounds Label bearing the catalog number KSLA-0051. The single is composed by Jun Maeda and arranged by Hikarishuyo.

All tracks are written by Jun Maeda.

Track listing
No.	Title	Length
1.	"Crow Song"	4:08
2.	"Alchemy"	4:16
3.	"My Song"	4:53
Total length:		13:17

=== Thousand Enemies ===
"Thousand Enemies" is a single by Girls Dead Monster, featuring songs sung by Yui (LiSA), released on May 12, 2010, in Japan by Key Sounds Label bearing the catalog number KSLA-0052. The single is composed by Jun Maeda and arranged by Hikarishuyo. The AMG Music School provides the chorus in the third track "Highest Life".

All tracks are written by Jun Maeda.

Track listing
No.	Title	Length
1.	"Thousand Enemies"	4:49
2.	"Rain Song"	5:01
3.	"Highest Life"	6:26
Total length:		16:16

=== My Soul, Your Beats! / Brave Song ===
"My Soul, Your Beats! / Brave Song" is a split single released on May 26, 2010, in Japan by Key Sounds Label bearing the catalog numbers KSLA-0053 (limited edition) and KSLA-0054 (regular edition). The two title tracks, performed by Lia and Aoi Tada respectively, were used as opening and ending themes to the Angel Beats! anime series. Each song is presented in full length, TV size, and instrumental versions. The single is written by Jun Maeda and arranged by the group Anant-Garde Eyes. The single debuted at No. 3 on Japan's Oricon weekly singles chart, selling about 80,000 copies in its first week of sales. It also ranked at No. 7 on Billboard's Japan Hot 100. The limited edition contained a bonus DVD containing a no-credit version of the opening and ending animation sequences used in the anime.

All tracks are written by Jun Maeda.

Track listing
No.	Title	Artist	Length
1.	"My Soul, Your Beats!"	Lia	4:35
2.	"Brave Song"	Aoi Tada	5:25
3.	"My Soul, Your Beats! (TV Size)"	Lia	1:35
4.	"Brave Song (TV Size)"	Aoi Tada	1:48
5.	"My Soul, Your Beats! (Instrumental)"		4:35
6.	"Brave Song (Instrumental)"		5:25
Total length:			23:23

=== Little Braver ===
"Little Braver" is a single by Girls Dead Monster, featuring songs sung by Yui (LiSA), released on June 9, 2010, in Japan by Key Sounds Label bearing the catalog number KSLA-0055. The single is composed by Jun Maeda and arranged by Hikarishuyo.

All tracks are written by Jun Maeda.

Track listing
No.	Title	Length
1.	"Little Braver"	4:33
2.	"Shine Days"	4:56
3.	"Answer Song"	5:34
Total length:		15:03

=== Last Song ===
"Last Song" is a single by Girls Dead Monster, featuring songs sung by Masami Iwasawa (Marina), released on December 8, 2010, in Japan by Key Sounds Label bearing the catalog number KSLA-0064. The single is composed by Jun Maeda and arranged by Hikarishuyo.

All tracks are written by Jun Maeda.

Track listing
No.	Title	Length
1.	"Last Song"	5:36
2.	"Hot Meal (Another "Thousand Enemies")"	4:57
3.	"God Bless You"	10:32
Total length:		21:05

=== Ichiban no Takaramono (Yui final ver.) ===
"Ichiban no Takaramono (Yui final ver.)" is a single by Girls Dead Monster, featuring songs sung by Yui (LiSA), released on December 8, 2010, in Japan by Key Sounds Label bearing the catalog number KSLA-0065. The single is composed by Jun Maeda and arranged by Hikarishuyo.

All tracks are written by Jun Maeda.

Track listing
No.	Title	Length
1.	"Ichiban no Takaramono (Yui final ver.)" (一番の宝物)	6:08
2.	"Storm Song"	4:13
3.	"Day Game"	4:53
Total length:		15:14

=== Heartily Song ===
"Heartily Song" is a single released on April 1, 2015, in Japan by Key Sounds Label bearing the catalog number KSLM-0099. The single contains the opening and ending theme songs to Angel Beats! -1st beat- sung by Lia and Suzuyu, respectively. Each song is presented in full length, game size, and instrumental versions. The single is composed by Jun Maeda and Tomohiro Takeshita, and arranged by the group Anant-Garde Eyes.

All lyrics are written by Jun Maeda.

Track listing
No.	Title	Music	Artist	Length
1.	"Heartily Song"	Jun Maeda	Lia	5:19
2.	"Subete no Owari no Hajimari" (すべての終わりの始まり The Start of the End of It All)	Tomohiro Takeshita	Suzuyu	5:54
3.	"Heartily Song (Instrumental)"	Jun Maeda		5:18
4.	"Subete no Owari no Hajimari (Instrumental)" (すべての終わりの始まり The Start of the End of It All)	Tomohiro Takeshita		5:19
5.	"Heartily Song (Game Size)"	Jun Maeda	Lia	2:58
6.	"Subete no Owari no Hajimari (Short Ver.)" (すべての終わりの始まり The Start of the End of It All)	Tomohiro Takeshita	Suzuyu	4:19
Total length:				29:42

=== Million Star ===
"Million Star" is a single by Girls Dead Monster, featuring Masami Iwasawa (Marina), released on June 26, 2015, in Japan by Key Sounds Label bearing the catalog number KSLA-0101. The single was released to those who pre-ordered the limited edition of Angel Beats! 1st Beat. The single is composed by Jun Maeda and arranged by Hikarishuyo.

All tracks are written by Jun Maeda.

Track listing
No.	Title	Length
1.	"Million Star"	4:53
2.	"Million Star (Instrumental)"	4:53
Total length:		9:46

=== Awakening Song ===
"Awakening Song" is a single by Girls Dead Monster, featuring songs sung by Yui (LiSA) and Masami Iwasawa (Marina), released on December 18, 2021, at Visual Arts Winter Fes in Japan by Key Sounds Label bearing the catalog number KSLA-0186. The single is composed by Jun Maeda and arranged by Hikarishuyo.

All tracks are written by Jun Maeda.

Track listing
No.	Title	Artist	Length
1.	"Awakening Song"	Yui (LiSA), Masami Iwasawa (Marina)	6:06
2.	"Girls Don't Cry"	Yui (LiSA)	5:41
3.	"Crow Blues"	Masami Iwasawa (Marina)	5:10
Total length:			16:57

== Charts ==
Albums	Release date	Label	Format	Peak Oricon chart positions
"Crow Song"	April 23, 2010	Key Sounds Label (KSLA-0051)	CD	7
"Thousand Enemies"	May 12, 2010	Key Sounds Label (KSLA-0052)	CD	4
"My Soul, Your Beats! / Brave Song"	May 26, 2010	Key Sounds Label (KSLA-0053 and KSLA-0054)	CD, CD+DVD	3
"Little Braver"	June 9, 2010	Key Sounds Label (KSLA-0055)	CD	2
Keep The Beats!	June 30, 2010	Key Sounds Label (KSLA-0058)	CD	6
Angel Beats! Original Soundtrack	July 28, 2010	Key Sounds Label (KSLA-0059—0060)	CD	9
"Last Song"	December 8, 2010	Key Sounds Label (KSLA-0064)	CD	2
"Ichiban no Takaramono (Yui final ver.)"	December 8, 2010	Key Sounds Label (KSLA-0065)	CD	3
"Heartily Song"	April 1, 2015	Key Sounds Label (KSLA-0099)	CD	17
