= The Graduates =

The Graduates may refer to:

- The Graduates (1986 film), a Romanian coming-of-age film
- The Graduates (1995 film), an Italian comedy
- The Graduates (2008 film), an American teen comedy
- The Graduates (2023 film), an American drama
- The Graduates, a comedy troupe that collaborated on the 1977 film Cracking Up
- "The Graduates" (Full House), a 1991 TV episode
- "The Graduates" (The O.C.), a 2006 TV episode
- "The Graduates", a 2015 song by Speedy Ortiz from Foil Deer

== See also ==
- The Graduate (disambiguation)
- Graduate (disambiguation)
