= Marina (Japanese singer) =

- Born: Marina Nakamura (中村 真里奈, Nakamura Marina); February 7, 1987 (age 39); Miyazaki, Japan
- Genres: J-pop
- Occupations: Singer; songwriter
- Years active: 2010–present
- Labels: Key Sounds Label (2010); 5pb. (2013–present)
- Website: nakamuramarina.net

Marina Nakamura (中村 真里奈, Nakamura Marina; born February 7, 1987) is a Japanese singer and songwriter from Miyazaki. She is signed to 5pb. and debuted in 2010 singing songs for the anime television series Angel Beats! as one of two vocalists for the fictional band Girls Dead Monster. In May 2013, she made her major solo debut with the release of her single "Kimi Tsunagu".

== Career ==
Marina had an interest in singing from a young age, and participated in singing contests in Miyazaki Prefecture, Japan. In 2010, Marina made her debut singing songs composed by Jun Maeda for the anime series Angel Beats! as one of two vocalists for the fictional in-story band Girls Dead Monster. Marina was the vocalist for the character Masami Iwasawa, and the second vocalist, LiSA, sang as the character Yui. As Girls Dead Monster, Marina put out two singles in 2010 on Key's record label Key Sounds Label. The first single "Crow Song" was released on April 23, and the second single "Last Song" was released on December 8. Marina made her first appearance at the 2010 Animelo Summer Live on August 28.

Between 2010 and 2012, Marina was featured as a singer on several albums and singles by the artists Deco*27, Sasakure.UK, and Gokigen Sound. In 2012, Marina sang the opening theme song "Kaihō no Hi" (解放の日) to the game Liberation Maiden featured on Level-5's Guild01 video game compilation. Marina made her solo debut on May 29, 2013, with the release of her first single "Kimi Tsunagu" (キミ∽ツナグ) by 5pb. "Kimi Tsunagu" is used as the opening theme song to Lass' 2013 visual novel Shōjo Shin'iki Shōjo Tengoku: The Garden of Fifth Zoa; "Eikyū yori Eien ni" (永久より永遠に) from the same single is used as the game's ending theme song. Marina released her second single "Kimi wa Mō, Hitori Janai" (キミはもう、ひとりじゃない) on December 4, 2013. Marina's third single "Hug" was released on May 28, 2014; this song is used as the ending theme to the PlayStation Vita video game Hyperdevotion Noire: Goddess Black Heart. Marina's fourth single "Owaranai Monogatari" (終わらない物語) was released on August 27, 2014; the song is used as the opening theme to Lass' 2014 visual novel Mayoeru Futari to Sekai no Subete. Her fifth single "Unite" was released on October 29, 2014; the song is used as the ending theme to the PlayStation Vita video game Hyperdimension Neptunia U. In 2015, Marina reunited with Maeda for the anime series Charlotte as the vocalist for the fictional in-story band Zhiend. She sang the opening theme "Sekai wa Hitotsu no Butai" (世界は一つの舞台) and the ending theme "Tsukiakari no Curtain Call" (月灯りのカーテンコール) from the 2015 video game Project X Zone 2.

== Discography ==
=== Singles ===
Year	Song	Peak Oricon chart positions	Certifications (sales thresholds)	Album
2010	"Crow Song"	7	JP: Gold	
2010	"Last Song"	2		
2013	"Kimi Tsunagu"	141		
2013	"Kimi wa Mō, Hitori Janai"	—		
2014	"Hug"	100		
2014	"Owaranai Monogatari"	—		
2014	"Unite"	79		
2015	"Trigger"	11		Echo
2020	"My Baby"	—		
"—" denotes releases that did not chart.

=== Other album appearances ===
Year	Song(s)	Album	Notes	Ref.
2012	"Birth (Yūkyū no Meguriboshi)"	Conception: Ore no Kodomo o Undekure! Original Soundtrack	Soundtrack to PlayStation Portable (PSP) game Conception: Ore no Kodomo o Undekure!	
2012	"Hatsukoi Rhythm"	Kimi Kare: Shingakki Drama CD+α	Theme song to the PSP game Kimi Kare: Shingakki	
2013	"Kake Tsuki no Yoru ni"	Imperial Arc	Theme song to SkyFish's visual novel Tsukumono Kanade: Kaketsuki no Yasōkyoku	
2014	"Crow Song" "Alchemy" "Hot Meal"	Rare Tracks	Mini album released for the anime series Angel Beats!.	
2015	"Blood Colour" "Scar on Face" "Fallin'" "Sinking Ships" "Ray of Light" "Heavy Rain" "Vanishing Day" "Trigger" "Adore" "Clouded Sky" "Live for You" "Feedback"	Echo	Album released for the anime series Charlotte as Sala Shane of the in-story band Zhiend.	
2015	"History"	"Symmetric Generation / History"	Ending theme song to the PlayStation Vita game Superdimension Neptune VS Sega Hard Girls of the Hyperdimension Neptunia series.	
2021	"Awakening Song"	"Awakening Song"	Under the name Girls Dead Monster, the in-story band in the anime series Angel Beats!. "Awakening Song" is a duet with LiSA.	
2021	"Crow Blues"	"Awakening Song"	Under the name Girls Dead Monster, the in-story band in the anime series Angel Beats!. "Awakening Song" is a duet with LiSA.	

=== Other video album appearances ===
Year	Song(s)	Video album	Artist(s)	Notes	Ref.
2011	"Alchemy" "Brave Song"	Animelo Summer Live 2010: Evolution 8.28	Various artists	"Brave Song" was sung with Lia and LiSA.	
