= Broccoli, You Too? =

South Korean indie rock band

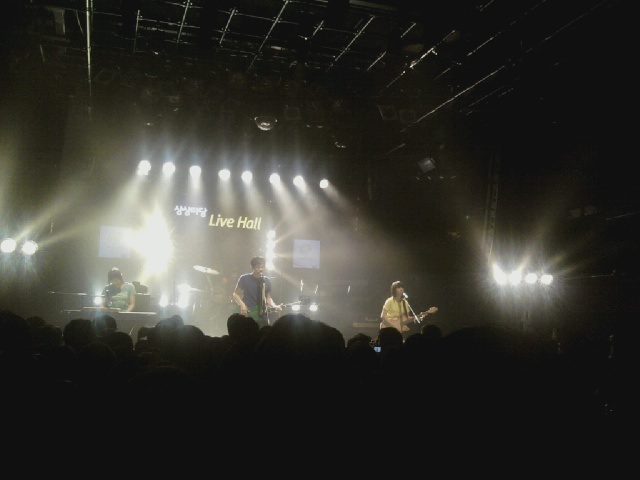
- Broccoli You Too performing in 2009

Background information
- Origin: Seoul, South Korea
- Genres: Indie rock; indie pop
- Years active: 2005-present
- Label: Studio Broccoli
- Members: Jandi; Deokwon; Ryuji (singer)
- Past members: Hyangki; Gyepi; Kim Hyeonho

Broccoli, You Too? (Korean: 브로콜리 너마저) is a South Korean indie band. The band currently consists of Jandi, Deokwon and Ryuji. Since their formation in 2005, the band has released three studio albums Song is Universal (보편적인 노래) (2008), Graduation (졸업) (2010) and Snobs (속물들) (2019). The band won the Best Modern Song at the 2010 and 2011 Korean Music Awards.

== History ==
Broccoli, You Too? was formed in 2005 and made its debut with the demo song When Spring Comes/Cooku Coo (봄이 오면/꾸꾸꾸). The band's name Broccoli, You Too? comes from the famous phrase "Et tu, Brute?" from the William Shakespeare's play Julius Caesar, which the band once interviewed wanted many people to remember by the band name. In 2007 they released a ban on EP No More Encore (앵콜 요청 금지). They released their first studio album Song is Universal (보편적인 노래) in 2008, and became popular as a rookie band to the Korean indie music scene in the late 2000s, along with Kiha & The Faces and The Black Skirts. They won the Best Modern Rock Song at the 2010 Korean Music Awards for Song is Universal

Prior to the release of their second album, member Gyepi left the band, and they founded their own label Studio Broccoli. They released their second album Graduation (졸업) in 2010 and performed live on You Hee-yeol's Sketchbook. They won the Best Modern Rock Song again at the 2011 Korean Music Awards, making it their second consecutive reward. They released their new song I Want to Forget (잊어버리고 싶어요) in 2016, and member Yoon Deokwon released his first solo album Joke (농담) in 2017.

The band released their third studio album Snobs (속물들) in 2019. The band introduced the album as "an album that tells the story of ordinary people in their 20s and 30s." Along with the release of the album, the music video for the title track Snobs was also released, but the music video was banned by the Broadcasting Review Board for being reminiscent of the loan business. They performed at the Pentaport Rock Festival in August.

In 2020, member Hyangki left the band. In 2021, they released an EP I Feel Like I'd Have to Do Something (어떻게든 뭐라도 해야 할 것 같아서). In 2023, they produced Yoon Jiyoung's song As the elbow touches it (팔꿈치가 닿을 만큼).

== Discography ==
=== Studio albums ===
- Song is Universal (보편적인 노래) (2008)
- Graduation (졸업) (2010)
- Snobs (속물들) (2019)

=== EPs ===
- No More Encore (앵콜 요청 금지) (2007)
- I Feel Like I'd Have to Do Something (어떻게든 뭐라도 해야 할 것 같아서) (2021)
- The Early Tropical Nights (이른 열대야) (2021)
