= The Graduate (disambiguation) =

The Graduate is a 1967 comedy-drama-romance film.

The Graduate may also refer to:

  - The Graduate (novel), a novel by Charles Webb that the movie was based on
  - The Graduate (soundtrack), the soundtrack to the 1967 movie featuring songs by Simon & Garfunkel
- The Graduate (2013 film), a South Korean film
- The Graduate (MC Lars album), the fifth studio album of MC Lars
- The Graduate (Nerina Pallot album), the third studio album of Nerina Pallot
- The Graduate, a 2007 mixtape by Kanye West
- The Graduate (band), an American rock band
- "The Graduate" (Dawson's Creek), a 2001 television episode
- Graduate level, an alternative name for postgraduate education

== See also ==
- Graduate (disambiguation)
- The Graduates (disambiguation)
