= Enigmatic LIA =

Studio album by Lia
- Released: December 13, 2006
- Recorded: 2005
- Genre: Happy Hardcore

Lia chronology
Colors of life (2005)	Enigmatic LIA (2006)

Enigmatic LIA is the third studio album by Japanese singer-songwriter Lia.

== Track listing ==
=== CD ===
1. 輝～HIKARI (enigmatic mix) / Shine～HIKARI (enigmatic mix)
2. NEW WORLD (OMEGA FORCE mix)
3. Farewell Song (DJ Storm & Euphony remix)
4. Goin'on! (original mix)
5. getting started (TRUE SKOOL remix)
6. FAIRY LAND (DJ ZET mix)
7. あなたがいるだけで (NUstyle GABBA mix) / You Just Are (NUstyle GABBA mix)
8. Starting Over (From the album "prismatic")
9. You are... (OMEGA FORCE mix)
10. SAYONARA (original mix)
11. I'm wondering (original mix)
12. enigmatic (original mix)
13. Birthday Song, Requiem (Eupho-LIA Hardcore remix)
14. Light In the Air (original version)

=== DVD ===
1. Light In the Air -Music Video-
2. enigmatic LIA -Commercial Movie-
