= Lia (Japanese singer) =

Japanese singer-songwriter

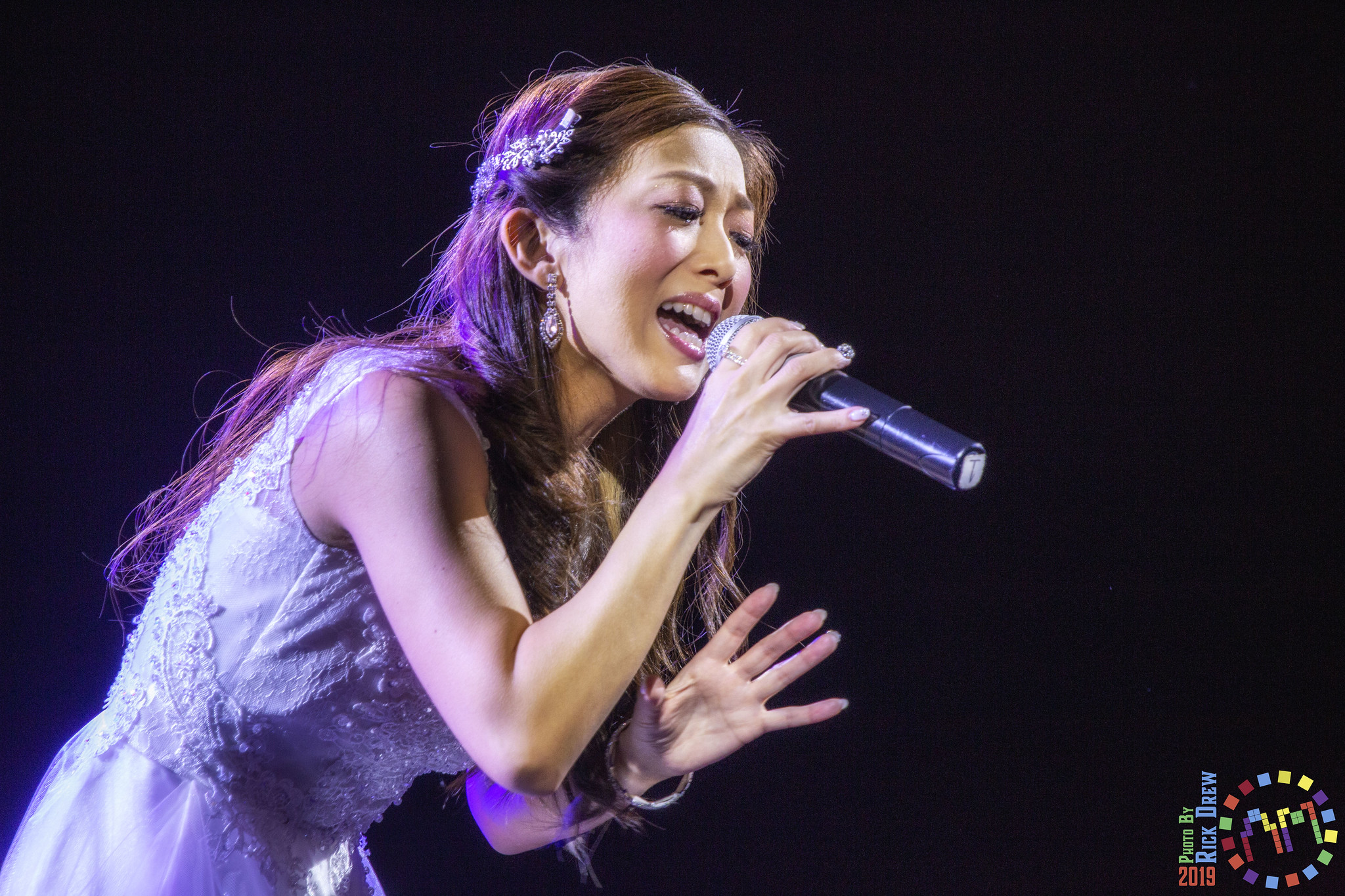
- Lia performing in 2022 at Anime Midwest

Background information
- Also known as: LIA
- Born: December 20
- Genres: J-pop; trance; techno; happy hardcore; new-age
- Occupations: Singer; songwriter
- Years active: 2000–present
- Spouse: Unknown (m. 2009)
- Website: 1stplace.co.jp

Lia (born December 20; also stylized in all caps as LIA) is a Japanese singer and songwriter. Lia recorded "Tori no Uta" for Key's 2000 visual novel Air, which was reused in its 2005 anime adaptation and became influential in popular culture. She additionally recorded two other tracks for the visual novel, which were commercially successful.

Lia has continued to work with Key by performing songs for their 2004 visual novel Clannad and its 2008 anime adaptation, Clannad After Story, the 2005 adult visual novel Tomoyo After: It's a Wonderful Life, as well as the opening themes for Key's original anime series Angel Beats! in 2010 and Charlotte in 2015. Her other songs used in anime include RF Online and Initial D Fourth Stage.

In 2012, the Vocaloid software IA was released, which sampled Lia's voice and earned a large fanbase.

== Career ==
Lia graduated from the Berklee College of Music. Afterwards, she lived in Los Angeles and recorded demo tapes with the help of a friend. Originally asked to help translate between the recording staff and the studio, Visual Arts asked Lia if she could fill in for an absent vocalist. Lia recorded her first song "Tori no Uta" at Paramount Studio.

Lia was a member of Japanese techno/trance music production group I've Sound from 2001 to 2003, where she performed "Disintegration" in the Disintegration compilation album. She signed with Key Sounds Label in 2001, and Pony Canyon in 2004. Lia produced four albums in the happy hardcore genre; these albums have her name in all capital letters.

Lia performed the opening and ending themes of two of Key's visual novels—Air and Tomoyo After: It's a Wonderful Life—as well as the opening themes for Key's two original anime series—Angel Beats! and Charlotte. She performed the theme song for the MMORPG RF Online entitled "The Force of Love". Lia has also performed some Eurobeat songs for the anime series Initial D Fourth Stage entitled "All Around" and "Sky High" under the Avex Trax label. To celebrate her 20th anniversary as an artist, she released a compilation album titled Lia 20th Best on November 25, 2020. In 2021 she released the song "Chiisana Kiseki" (ちいさなキセキ), which was used as the theme song to the anime series Kaginado.

== Personal life ==
Lia is fluent in English and Japanese. On July 1, 2009, Lia announced on her blog that she was married and pregnant. She gave birth to a daughter on January 31, 2010. On June 27, 2013, Lia gave birth to her second child, a son. She has been living in Hong Kong since 2014.

== Discography ==
=== Singles ===
1. "Natsukage / Nostalgia" (December 24, 2001)
2. "Shift: Sedai no Mukō" (December 29, 2001)
3. "I'm Feeling" (July 1, 2003) – Analog single
4. "Birthday Song, Requiem" (June 25, 2004)
5. "Spica/Hanabi/Moon" (June 25, 2004)
6. "Kimi no Yoin: Tōi no Sora no Shita de" (March 24, 2005)
7. "Tori no Uta / Farewell Song" (May 23, 2006) – Analog single
  - Opening/ending themes of Air
8. "Pride: Try to Fight!" (June 21, 2006)
  - The title song was used as an ending theme of Crash B-Daman
9. "Over the Future" (November 22, 2006)
  - "Over the Future" was used as an ending theme of Crash B-Daman
10. "Doll / Human" (January 30, 2008) – Single with Aoi Tada #54 on Oricon
  - "Doll" and "Human" were used as ending themes for Gunslinger Girl -Il Teatrino-
11. "Toki o Kizamu Uta / Torch" (November 14, 2008) #13 on Oricon
  - Opening/ending themes of the Clannad After Story anime series
12. "My Soul, Your Beats! / Brave Song" (May 26, 2010) – Single with Aoi Tada #3 on Oricon
  - Performed "My Soul, Your Beats!", which was used as the opening theme to the Angel Beats! anime series
13. "Ashita Tenki ni Naare" (July 21, 2010)
  - Title song was used as the first ending theme for Daimajin Kanon and "Aruite Kaerō" was used for the second ending theme
14. "Kizunairo" (October 27, 2010) #6 on Oricon
  - Opening theme for the Fortune Arterial anime series
15. "Justitia"
  - Opening theme for the Wizard Barristers anime series
16. "Daze / Days" (June 18, 2014)
  - Performed "Days", which was used as the ending theme for the Mekakucity Actors anime series
17. "Heartily Song" (April 1, 2015)
  - Opening theme for the Angel Beats! -1st beat- visual novel
18. "Bravely You / Yakeochinai Tsubasa" (August 26, 2015) – Single with Aoi Tada #4 on Oricon
  - Performed "Bravely You", which was used as the opening theme to the Charlotte anime series

=== Albums ===
==== Original albums ====
1. Prismatic, Released June 25, 2004
2. Colors of life, Released May 25, 2005
3. Gift, Released December 29, 2005
4. Dearly, Released November 1, 2006
5. Collection Album Vol.1 [Diamond Days], Released September 19, 2007
6. Collection Album Vol.2 [Crystal Voice], Released October 17, 2007
7. New Moon, Released September 2, 2008
8. Key+Lia Best 2001–2010, Released June 24, 2011
9. Sagaribana, Released November 19, 2025

==== Happy hardcore albums ====
1. enigmatic LIA, Released September 22, 2005
2. enigmatic LIA 2, Released February 16, 2007
3. Collection Album [Spectrum Rays], Released October 17, 2007
4. enigmatic LIA 3 -worldwide collection-, Released April 1, 2009
5. enigmatic LIA 4 -Anthemical Keyworlds- & -Anthemnia L's core-, Released June 22, 2011

=== Other songs ===
- "Akai Yakusoku" (Fortune Arterial visual novel ending theme)
- "Aozora" (Air insert song)
- "All Around" / "Sky High" (Initial D 4th Stage insert songs)
- "Ana" (Clannad insert song)
- "Yakusoku" (Clannad film image song)
- "Light colors" (Opening theme of Tomoyo After: It's a Wonderful Life)
- "Life is like a Melody" (Ending theme of Tomoyo After)
- "Last regrets -acoustic version-" (featured on the Kanon arrange album Recollections)
- "The Force of Love" (Theme song for MMORPG RF Online)
- "Girls Can Rock" / "Feel Like A Girl" (School Rumble: Second Term insert songs)
- "Horizon" (featured in Beatmania IIDX 11: IIDX RED, produced by Kosuke Saito aka kors k)
- "Saya's Song" (Little Busters! Ecstasy insert song)
- "Tazunebito" (Hoshiuta opening theme)
- "Hoshikuzu no Kizuna" (Hoshiuta: Starlight Serenade opening theme)
- "Mado Kara Mieru" (Calling All Dawns)
- "Asu ni Mukatte, Get Dream!" (Crash B-Daman first ending theme)
- "I scream Chocolatl" (Team Nekokan feat. Lia, Kokoro Connect fourth ending theme)
