= Graduate =

Graduate may refer to:

== Education ==
- The subject of a graduation, i.e. someone who has been awarded an academic degree
  - An alumnus/alumna, a former student who has either attended or graduated from an institution
  - In the U.S., when used without qualification, usually someone who has obtained a bachelor's degree
- High school graduate, someone who has completed high school (in the U.S.)

== Arts and entertainment ==
- Graduate (band), the band that Roland Orzabal and Curt Smith were in before forming Tears for Fears
- The Graduate, a 1967 American film
- Graduate (film), a 2011 Telugu-language film
- "Graduate" (song), by Third Eye Blind, 1997

== Other uses ==
- Graduate (dinghy), a type of sailing vessel
- A trim level of the Alfa Romeo Spider sports car

== See also ==
- Graduation (disambiguation)
- The Graduate (disambiguation)
- Graduate diploma, a postgraduate qualification
- Graduate school, a school that awards advanced degrees
- Postgraduate education, a phase of higher education
- Graduated cylinder, a container with graduated markings used for measuring liquids
