= Graduation Day =

Graduation Day may refer to:

- Graduation, when one receives an academic degree or similar designation

== Film and television ==
- Graduation Day (1981 film), a slasher film
- Graduation Day (2026 film), a Philippine drama film
- Graduation Day, a 1968 film directed by Donald Shebib
- "Graduation Day" (The 4400 episode), a 2006 episode of The 4400
- "Graduation Day" (Beavis and Butt-head), a 1997 episode of Beavis and Butt-head
- "Graduation Day" (Buffy the Vampire Slayer), a 1999 two-part third-season finale episode of Buffy the Vampire Slayer
- "Graduation Day" (ER), a 2006 episode of ER
- "Graduation Day" (X-Men), the 1997 series finale episode of X-Men
- "Graduation Day" (Ultimate Spider-Man), the 2017 series finale episode of Ultimate Spider-Man

== Books and comics ==
- Titans/Young Justice: Graduation Day, a 2003 limited series by DC Comics
- Graduation Day, a 2000 Baby-sitters Club novel

== Music ==
- Graduation Day 1966, a live album by the Beach Boys
- Graduation Day, a 2012 album by Sturm und Drang
- "Graduation Day" (song), a 1956 song by The Four Freshmen
- "Graduation Day", a 1963 song by Bobby Pickett
- "Graduation Day", a 1965 song by the band The Ivy League
- "Graduation Day", a 1995 song by Chris Isaak in Forever Blue
- "Graduation Day", a 2004 song by Kanye West from The College Dropout
- "Graduation Day", a 2006 song by Head Automatica in Popaganda
