= Graduation (Broccoli, You Too? album) =

2010 album by Broccoli, You Too?

Studio album by Broccoli, You Too?
- Released: October 25, 2010
- Genre: Indie rock
- Length: 50:30
- Label: Studio Broccoli
- Producer: Broccoli, You Too?

Broccoli, You Too? chronology
Song is Universal (2008)	Graduation (2010)	Snobs (2019)

Graduation (Korean: 졸업; RR: Joleob) is the second studio album by South Korean indie rock band Broccoli, You Too?. The album was released on 25 October 2010. The album's title track Graduation won the best modern rock song at the 2011 Korean Music Awards.

== Background ==
After the release of their 2008 studio album Song is Universal, member Gyepi left the band, and the band founded their own label, Studio Broccoli. Yoon Deokwon interviewed the album and the title track, "We didn't know when we wrote the song, but when we made it all, these were the concerns we had in our 20s. Whenwe thought about what the word encompasses all of it, it was Graduation......it is the stage of growth, but I think everyone usually have such a process."

== Critical reception ==
Professional ratings
Review scores
Source	Rating
IZM	3/5 stars
Weiv	7/10

Wi Sooji of IZM described the album as "The sound and song progression of Graduation is far from unique, but such plainness and calmness come to the sound of more in-depth reading and understanding." Lee Sooyeon of Weiv reviewed "Hyangki's guitar, which used to connect riffs that transformed vocal melodies one by one, is already using various pickings, and the arrangement of songs and the consistency of the album are superior to that of their previous work."

== Track listing ==
No.	Title	Length
1.	"12:30" ("열두시 반")	3:20
2.	"Can't Soothe by Love" ("사랑한다는 말로도 위로가 되지 않는")	4:53
3.	"Suburb Boy and Girl" ("변두리 소년, 소녀")	4:09
4.	"Introduction to Communication" ("커뮤니케이션의 이해")	4:29
5.	"Don't Cry" ("울지마")	4:29
6.	"A Matter of Mind" ("마음의 문제")	4:41
7.	"Bye Now" ("이젠 안녕")	3:31
8.	"Grandma" ("할머니")	4:36
9.	"Seasons Changing" ("환절기")	5:03
10.	"Graduation" ("졸업")	5:25
11.	"5:30" ("다섯시 반")	5:54
