= Charlotte (TV series) =

2015 Japanese anime series

- Promotional image featuring the main characters (from left to right): Yuu Otosaka, Jōjirō Takajō, Yusa Nishimori and Nao Tomori.
- Genre: Comedy drama; supernatural
- Created by: Jun Maeda
- Manga

Charlotte The 4-koma: Seishun o Kakenukero!
- Written by: Jun Maeda
- Illustrated by: Haruka Komowata
- Published by: ASCII Media Works
- Magazine: Dengeki G's Comic
- Original run: May 2015 – May 2017
- Volumes: 3
- Anime television series
- Directed by: Yoshiyuki Asai
- Written by: Jun Maeda
- Music by: Jun Maeda; Anant-Garde Eyes; Hikarishuyo
- Studio: P.A. Works
- Licensed by: AUS: Madman Entertainment; NA: Aniplex of America; UK: Anime Limited
- Original network: Tokyo MX, CTC, tvk, TVS, GYT, GTV, MBS, CBC, TUT, BS11
- English network: SEA: Animax Asia
- Original run: July 5, 2015 – September 27, 2015
- Episodes: 13 + OVA
- Manga
- Written by: Jun Maeda
- Illustrated by: Makoto Ikezawa; Yū Tsurusaki
- Published by: ASCII Media Works
- Magazine: Dengeki G's Comic
- Original run: September 2015 – February 2019
- Volumes: 6
- icon

Charlotte is a 2015 Japanese anime television series produced by P.A. Works and directed by Yoshiyuki Asai. The anime aired 13 episodes in Japan between July 5 and September 27, 2015. An original video animation episode was released in March 2016. Two manga series were serialized in ASCII Media Works' Dengeki G's Comic. The story takes place in an alternate reality where a small percentage of children manifest superhuman abilities upon reaching puberty. The main character, Yuu Otosaka, is a high school boy who awakens the ability to temporarily possess others. This brings him to the attention of Nao Tomori, the student council president of a school founded as a haven for children with such abilities.

The story was originally conceived by Jun Maeda, who also wrote the screenplay and composed some of the music, with original character design by Na-Ga. Both Maeda and Na-Ga are from the visual novel studio Key, and Charlotte is the second original anime series created by Key following Angel Beats! in 2010. Maeda had thought up the concept for Charlotte long before he was approached in early 2012 to work on a new anime series. Maeda narrowed down the number of main characters compared to Angel Beats! and attempted to put more of a focus on their behavior. Instead of utilizing the same staff that worked on Angel Beats!, the aim for Charlotte was to bring together a team that would add new variety to the creative process to prevent being influenced by the work done on Angel Beats!.

Charlotte was praised for its unpredictability and evocative moments, but its pacing and structure have been criticized as inefficient. It has been described as approachable for a wide audience, and praised for defying the "moe anime" stereotype. Although some comedic elements have been criticized, overall they were lauded for offering relief from serious moments.

== Plot ==
Charlotte takes place in an alternate reality where a short-period comet called Charlotte passes near Earth once every 75 years. As this happens, it spreads dust onto the Earth, which causes a small percentage of pre-adolescent children who inhale the dust to manifest superhuman abilities upon reaching puberty. In Japan, the story follows the protagonist Yuu Otosaka, a boy who awakens the ability to temporarily possess another person for five seconds. Although hoping to use his ability to fraudulently live a carefree high school life, he is unexpectedly exposed by Nao Tomori, a girl who can make herself invisible to a specific target. She forces him to transfer to Hoshinoumi Academy (星ノ海学園, Hoshinoumi Gakuen; "Sea of Stars Academy") and join its student council, of which she is the president. Also on the student council is Jōjirō Takajō, a boy who can move at uncontrollably high speeds. The student council's main objective is to ensure the safety of ability users from organizations who seek to exploit their powers. In doing so, the student council warns ability users of the potential danger of using their abilities openly. This leads the student council to Yusa Nishimori, a pop singer who has the ability to channel the spirits of the dead as a medium. Yusa's dead older sister Misa frequently makes use of this ability to freely possess her at any time, which allows Misa to use her own ability, pyrokinesis. Nao soon arranges for Yusa to transfer to Hoshinoumi Academy and join the student council.

Yuu's younger sister Ayumi unexpectedly awakens an ability to cause anything around her to suddenly collapse, which results in her death. Yuu falls into a deep depression as a result and isolates himself, but Nao successfully manages to pull him out of his depression and gets him to return to the student council. While attending a concert of the post-rock band Zhiend with Nao, Yuu recollects previously suppressed memories of his older brother Shunsuke, who has the ability to time travel. Shunsuke had used this ability to establish Hoshinoumi Academy and an affiliated organization attempting to develop a vaccine to prevent children from developing abilities before they manifest, but his repeated use has left him blind. Yuu learns the true nature of his ability enables him to steal another person's ability by possessing them. Yuu takes Shunsuke's ability to go back in time and ultimately prevent Ayumi's death by stealing her collapse ability before she can use it.

A terrorist group manages to abduct Nao and Kumagami, one of Shunsuke's closest friends and aides, and holds them hostage in exchange for Yuu, who attempts to rescue them. However, the operation does not go as planned, which results in Kumagami's death and Yuu being gravely injured. After Yuu recovers, he resolves to protect all of the ability users around the world by stealing their abilities as per Nao's suggestion. As Yuu travels the world stealing abilities, the more powers he takes on soon takes its toll on him as he starts losing his memories and sense of self. However, he still manages to steal everyone's abilities throughout the world before collapsing. Shunsuke rescues Yuu, bringing him back to Japan among friends and family. Yuu is left with no memories, but Nao tells him she is his girlfriend. Yuu and his friends look forward to the memories they will make from now on as Yuu continues to recover from his ordeal.

== Characters ==
=== Main ===
The main characters of Charlotte (from left to right): Yusa, Jōjirō (back row); Nao, Ayumi, and Yuu (front row).

Yuu Otosaka (乙坂 有宇, Otosaka Yuu)
Voiced by: Koki Uchiyama (Japanese); Ray Chase (English)
Yuu is the protagonist of Charlotte. He develops a rude and narcissistic personality once he discovers he has the ability to take over another person's body for five seconds,^{ep 1} but the true nature of his ability enables him to steal someone's superhuman ability by possessing them.^{ep 9} Yuu is a first-year student at Hoshinoumi Academy, and he is forced to join its student council. Initially a fake honors student and chronic cheater, Yuu is reluctant to use his ability to aide the student council,^{ep 2} but as time goes on, he becomes less narcissistic and much more selfless and caring towards others.^{ep 8} Over the course of the story, he becomes a fan of the post-rock band Zhiend and falls in love with Nao.^{ep 9, ep 12} After Yuu travels worldwide to steal every ability user's power to protect them from being exploited, the strain of it causes him to lose all of his past memories.^{ep 13} His older brother is Shunsuke, and his younger sister is Ayumi.^{ep 1, ep 9}

Nao Tomori (友利 奈緒, Tomori Nao)
Voiced by: Ayane Sakura (Japanese); Lauren Landa (English)
Nao is a first-year student at Hoshinoumi Academy and is also its student council president.^{ep 1} She is a hardworking, intelligent, and shrewd girl, but is also narcissistic, self-righteous, and short-tempered.^{ep 2, ep 3} She has the ability to make herself invisible, but this is limited to one person of her choosing at a time. She uses this ability to her advantage to attack others she believes deserve to be kicked, but this causes her to be shunned and bullied by her peers. Although she initially shows no attraction towards Yuu,^{ep 1} she eventually falls in love with him and stays by his side even after he loses all of his memories of her.^{ep 13} She is a fan of Zhiend, influenced by her older brother Kazuki (一希; Voiced by: Kazuyuki Okitsu (Japanese); Vic Mignogna (English)), who once had the ability to control air movements and vibrations, which he used when playing the guitar.^{ep 2}

Jōjirō Takajō (高城 丈士朗, Takajō Jōjirō)
Voiced by: Takahiro Mizushima (Japanese); Lucien Dodge (English)
Jōjirō is a first-year student at Hoshinoumi Academy and is a member of its student council. His ability enables him to move at very fast speeds, but he is not able to control where he stops, resulting in frequent injuries.^{ep 1} To counteract this, he wears protective gear under his clothes. He is a huge fan of Yusa Nishimori and is extremely obsessed with her.^{ep 3}

Yusa Nishimori (西森 柚咲, Nishimori Yusa) / Yusa Kurobane (黒羽 柚咲, Kurobane Yusa)
Voiced by: Maaya Uchida (Japanese); Ryan Bartley (English)
Yusa, also known as "Yusarin", is a first-year student at Hoshinoumi Academy and is a member of its student council.^{ep 4} She has a bright and innocent personality complementing her popularity as a pop idol and lead singer of the band How-Low-Hello. Although her actual surname is Kurobane, she uses the stage surname Nishimori.^{ep 3} She has a series of "magic spells" derived from her time as a regular on a variety show.^{ep 4} She has the ability to channel the dead as a medium. However, she is initially not aware of this and only thinks she is sleepwalking whenever she is possessed.^{ep 3}

Misa Kurobane (黒羽 美砂, Kurobane Misa)
Voiced by: Maaya Uchida (Japanese); Ryan Bartley (English)
Misa is Yusa's deceased older sister by one year who died in an accident six months prior to the beginning of the story. Misa freely possesses her at any time, represented by a change in Yusa's eye and hair color. While possessing Yusa, Misa is able to use her own ability, pyrokinesis. Misa has a tomboyish and ill-tempered personality, and she is not afraid to be violent against anyone looking to harm her sister.^{ep 3} She disappears after Yuu takes away Yusa's power.^{ep 12}

Ayumi Otosaka (乙坂 歩未, Otosaka Ayumi)
Voiced by: Momo Asakura (Japanese); Kira Buckland (English)
Ayumi is Yuu and Shunsuke's energetic younger sister in junior high school.^{ep 1} She has an innocent personality and deeply cares for Yuu, providing moral support to him. Ayumi often cooks for Yuu and has a tendency to add pizza sauce to every food she makes, unaware Yuu's tastebuds cannot handle the sweetness.^{ep 2, ep 3} She is a fan of the band How-Low-Hello and an avid admirer of Yusa.^{ep 6} She eventually awakens an ability to cause anything around her to suddenly collapse, but this is stolen by Yuu to prevent her death.^{ep 10}

=== Others ===
- Shunsuke Otosaka (乙坂 隼翼, Otosaka Shunsuke) is Yuu and Ayumi's older brother, who has the ability to time travel. Using this power, he eventually manages to establish Hoshinoumi Academy to protect his fellow ability users. Overuse of his ability leads him to become blind, preventing him from making further use of it.^{ep 10} He is voiced by Daisuke Ono in Japanese and by Robbie Daymond in English.
- Takehito Kumagami (熊耳 武仁, Kumagami Takehito) is a mysterious student at Hoshinoumi Academy, who has the ability to locate an ability user and determine their ability. He helps the student council in finding ability users.^{ep 2} He works for Shunsuke, who nicknames him "Pooh".^{ep 10} He is killed after protecting Nao from falling wreckage.^{ep 11} He is voiced by Eiji Takemoto in Japanese and by Ben Pronsky in English.
- Medoki (目時) has the ability of hypnotism, which she uses to make someone fall asleep, but as a result, she falls asleep as well. She works for Shunsuke.^{ep 10} She is voiced by Asami Seto in Japanese and by Marieve Herington in English.
- Shichino (七野) has the ability of permeation, which he uses to pass through solid matter. However, this causes extreme exhaustion. He works for Shunsuke.^{ep 10} He is voiced by Kengo Kawanishi in Japanese and by Bobby Thong in English.
- Maedomari (前泊) has the ability to erase one's memory, which requires physical contact and time to find the wanted memories. He works for Shunsuke.^{ep 10} He is voiced by Natsuki Hanae in Japanese and by Griffin Burns in English.

== Production ==
=== Creation and conception ===
The original creators of Charlotte are Jun Maeda and Na-Ga of Key, and Charlotte is the second original anime series created by Key following Angel Beats! (2010). Yōsuke Toba of Aniplex approached Maeda in early 2012 with an offer from P.A. Works president Kenji Horikawa to do another anime series with the studio. Maeda was surprised by this, as he never expected to work with P.A. Works again. Horikawa explained the production staff could now handle things that were not able to be fully materialized during the production of Angel Beats!. Maeda did not think he would ever be involved in the planning of another anime series, but he said he had no choice but to accept Horikawa's offer after discussing it with him. Toba asked Maeda to write a "Key-like story", and Maeda started out by applying his prior experience of working on Angel Beats!. He went through a trial-and-error process to work out what kind of setting and story would work well for an anime series.

In terms of music, the concept albums Love Song and Owari no Hoshi no Love Song Maeda produced himself are closer to where Charlotte stands in comparison to the "video game theme music" he has written up to now.

— Yōsuke Toba, in response to the question, "What kind of work is Charlotte?"

Long before working on Charlotte, Maeda had thought up a concept for a story with characters who have imperfect superpowers and must cooperate with each other to resolve any incidents when it arises. Maeda originally submitted three separate ideas for a story to Toba, and he asked him which one he liked best. However, after Toba pointed out one of the other two, Maeda made it clear he wanted to do the story that would become Charlotte. When writing the story, Maeda also reconsidered how he had done certain things with Angel Beats!. In particular, he attempted to put more of a focus on the behavior of the characters. Maeda also narrowed down the number of main characters in Charlotte compared to Angel Beats!, which could not put a focus on each and every character. Toba felt Maeda was influenced by his work on Angel Beats!, which changed his thought process and what he wanted to depict in Charlotte.

Maeda thought issues had arisen with the large cast of characters in Angel Beats!, such as overlapping personality traits and not being able to remember everyone, and he used those considerations when writing Charlotte. Similarly, when designing the characters in Angel Beats!, Na-Ga had been concerned about designs being too similar among the characters, and went on to make use of experience with Charlotte. When developing Jōjirō Takajō, he originally had a different appearance and personality, but over the course of the development process, he eventually became similar to Takamatsu from Angel Beats!. Maeda decided fairly early on to make Yuu Otosaka a low-life cheater at the start of Charlotte because he had never created a character like this before. When trying to choose a title for Charlotte, Maeda's friend Taisei Nakagawa proposed a title which could be abbreviated as "AA" based on its similarity to Angel Beats!'s abbreviation of "AB". However, Maeda did not like the title, and devised the title Charlotte as the one would surpass the original "AA" title. The title Charlotte came from the song "Charlotte" (シャーロット, Shārotto) by the Japanese band Art-School.

=== Development ===
When deciding on Charlotte's staff, Toba thought it would be better not to have exactly the same team which produced Angel Beats!. Having already decided to stick with Maeda, Na-Ga and P.A. Works, Toba aimed to bring together a team would add a new variety to the creative process, and in doing so would prevent being influenced by the work done on Angel Beats!. With this in mind, Toba wanted a director who had a good understanding of Angel Beats! and who would also be suitable as Charlotte's director, leading him to seek out Yoshiyuki Asai. Toba took into consideration the storyboarding Asai had done for two episodes of Angel Beats!, and he thought Charlotte would be a good opportunity to have a first-time series director. Asai was also chosen as someone who could handle both comedic and serious moments. When Horikawa first looked at Charlotte's incomplete script, he told Maeda it did not feel like it had the same kind of zeal as Angel Beats! had. However, once he saw the whole script, his concerns with it were dispelled, much to Maeda's relief.

While the entire script was still in the draft phase, Maeda revised lines that felt unnatural after asking others for their opinions on it, including Na-Ga. When writing the script, Maeda made a conscious effort to write Charlotte in the framework of an anime series, as opposed to when he wrote the script for Angel Beats!, which he admits he wrote more akin to the framework of a video game. In this way, Toba felt Charlotte was Maeda's effort to write a story in its purest form could not be made into a video game, unlike Angel Beats!. Toba also noted the characters in Charlotte are not written for a video game scenario, especially the protagonist, and went on to echo Horikawa's sentiment Charlotte is akin to an I novel for Maeda. Toba explained this is a result of Maeda's effort to remove the restrictions came from writing the scenario for a video game.

Kanami Sekiguchi was chosen as the character designer after Horikawa took notice of her work as the animation director of episode nine of Angel Beats!, and Toba was eager to see how she would render Na-Ga's original designs. When it came time to choose an art director, Kazuki Higashiji was chosen for his zeal in the workplace and Horikawa's confidence in his artistic talent; Higashiji had also been the art director for Angel Beats!. Similarly, Satoki Iida was brought back to work on Charlotte again as the sound and music director, and he also helped with the proofreading of the script as he had done for Angel Beats!. Iida was largely chosen for his good communication with Maeda, and so he could make the best use of his experience working on Angel Beats!. When writing the music for How-Low-Hello, Maeda reused some older songs he had composed as a student in the 1990s he felt were selective of his best songs from the period. At the time, his concept when composing the songs was "early B'z", but Maeda notes this is no longer the case with the completed songs.

== Media ==
=== Manga ===
A four-panel comic strip manga, illustrated by Haruka Komowata and titled Charlotte The 4-koma: Seishun o Kakenukero! (Charlotte The ４コマ せーしゅんを駆け抜けろ!), was serialized from the May 2015 issue of ASCII Media Works' Dengeki G's Comic sold on March 30, 2015 to the May 2017 issue sold on March 30, 2017. Three tankōbon volumes for Charlotte The 4-koma were released between September 26, 2015, and May 27, 2017. A second manga, illustrated by Makoto Ikezawa and Yū Tsurusaki, is titled Charlotte and was serialized from the September 2015 issue of Dengeki G's Comic sold on July 30, 2015, and the February 2019 issue sold on December 27, 2018. Charlotte is also available on Kadokawa Corporation's ComicWalker website. Six tankōbon volumes for Charlotte were released between August 27, 2015, and January 26, 2019.

=== Anime ===
The 13-episode Charlotte anime television series is directed by Yoshiyuki Asai and produced by P.A. Works and Aniplex. The series aired in Japan between July 5 and September 27, 2015. The screenplay is written by Jun Maeda, who originally conceived the series. The chief animators are Noboru Sugimitsu and Kanami Sekiguchi, and Sekiguchi based the character design used in the anime on Na-Ga's original designs. Sound and music direction is headed by Satoki Iida.

The series is being released on seven Blu-ray/DVD compilation volumes between September 23, 2015, and March 30, 2016, in limited and regular editions. The seventh volume featured an original video animation episode. In North America, the series is licensed by Aniplex of America, who simulcasted the series on Aniplex Channel, Crunchyroll, Hulu, Daisuki, Viewster, and Animax Asia. The series was obtained by Madman Entertainment for digital distribution in Australia and New Zealand who simulcasted the series on AnimeLab. Anime Limited licensed the anime series in the United Kingdom and released it on Blu-ray on May 29, 2017.

The anime's music is composed by Maeda, Hikarishuyo, and the group Anant-Garde Eyes, who also provided the musical arrangement. The music is released on Key's record label Key Sounds Label. The single "Bravely You / Yakeochinai Tsubasa" (灼け落ちない翼) was released on August 26, 2015, in limited (CD+DVD) and regular (CD) editions; the limited edition's DVD contains the opening and ending videos without the credits. There are two in-story bands: How-Low-Hello featuring vocals by Maaya Uchida, and Zhiend featuring vocals by Marina. One single and one album was released for both bands in 2015. How-Low-Hello's single "Rakuen Made / Hatsunetsu Days" (楽園まで/発熱デイズ) was released on September 2, and the band's album Smells Like Tea, Espresso was released on September 30. Zhiend's single "Trigger" was released on September 9, and the band's album Echo was released on October 14 as a two-CD set for both English and Japanese lyrics. The anime's original soundtrack was released on November 4, 2015, as a two-CD set.

=== Audio ===
An Internet radio show to promote the anime series titled Charlotte Radio: Tomori Nao no Seitokai Katsudō Nikki (Charlotteラジオ 〜友利奈緒の生徒会活動日誌〜, Charlotte Radio: Nao Tomori's Student Council Activity Log) streamed 13 weekly broadcasts between July 6 and September 28, 2015, on Niconico. The show was also available via Hibiki Radio Station and Onsen, and was hosted by Ayane Sakura (the voice of Nao). Two CD compilation volumes for the show were released between September 30, 2015, and January 27, 2016.

Three drama CDs, written by Maeda and performed by the anime's cast, were released with the first, third and fifth volumes of the anime's Blu-ray/DVD compilation.

== Reception ==
In a review by Anime News Network, reviewer Gabriella Ekens praised the series for "sculpting singular, evocative moments", but went on to say a "problem arises when you try to tie them into a bigger picture." Ekens criticized the pacing and structure of the show, calling it an "inefficient...collection of sprawling narrative ideas" and comparing it to "Anohana suddenly turn[ing] into Darker than Black." Ekens also notes its thematic purpose "seems to be Jun Maeda's opportunity for melodramatic elaboration on the emotional dilemmas posed by Madoka Magica." Overall, Charlotte was lauded for its entertainment value and unpredictability, but "disappoints as a work of art." Early on, Ekens described the series as having "sharp comedic timing," and by episode four, she praised the comedic elements as "already much funnier than Plastic Memories." She went on to say "it's dumb, but I like it for the same reasons I liked the comedy in Seraph of the End: Vampire Reign." Chris Beveridge of The Fandom Post found Charlotte's unpredictability "engaging" and its animation "beautiful". Ekens praised P.A. Works for their dynamic direction and "expressive cinematography" which offers "a distinct, pleasant aesthetic."

In a column on Mainichi Shimbun's Mantanweb portal, Charlotte was praised for the balance it strikes to reach a wide audience, from "core fans" of anime to casual viewers, in regards to its creative use of peculiar characters coupled with a scenario focused on resolving problems. Columnist Ryō Koarai commended Charlotte for pulling in the viewer from the first episode due to Yuu's surprising, unorthodox personality in contrast with how he uses his superhuman ability in his everyday life. Writer Seiji Nakazawa lauded Charlotte for defying the "moe anime" stereotype at first glance and for instead being what he describes as a "human drama". He notes Charlotte is written in much the same way as Maeda's previous works by inserting jokes between serious moments to offer some relief to the viewer. While Nakazawa admits some may find the jokes in Charlotte corny, he finds them acceptable and likens them to a palate cleanser.

In a review for Neo, David West praised Charlotte for the interesting premise, the cinematography and the animation, but criticized the series for being unable to maintain a consistent tone, noting the series had an abundance of slapstick and physical comedy, but would unexpectedly take a dark turn, although he praised the dark side of the series for being well realized.

The seven Blu-ray compilation volumes ranked in the top 15 on Japan's Oricon weekly Blu-ray sales chart for animation: Volume one ranked at No. 1, volume two ranked at No. 6, volume three ranked at No. 9, volume four ranked at No. 4, volume five ranked at No. 10, volume six ranked at No. 13, and volume seven ranked at No. 3. The opening and ending theme song single "Bravely You / Yakeochinai Tsubasa" debuted at No. 4 on Japan's Oricon weekly singles chart, selling over 23,000 copies in its first week of sales. How-Low-Hello's single "Rakuen Made / Hatsunetsu Days" debuted at No. 9 on the Oricon singles chart, selling about 9,300 copies in its first week of sales. How-Low-Hello's album Smells Like Tea, Espresso debuted at No. 12 on the Oricon albums chart, selling about 9,500 copies in its first week of sales. Zhiend's single "Trigger" debuted at No. 11 on the Oricon singles chart, selling about 14,000 copies in its first week of sales. Zhiend's album Echo debuted at No. 4 on the Oricon albums chart, selling about 10,300 copies in its first week of sales. The Charlotte Original Soundtrack debuted at No. 9 on the Oricon albums chart, selling about 6,600 copies in its first week of sales.

== Notes and references ==
Notes

- ^ep represents the episode of the anime series.

General

- "November issue". Newtype (in Japanese). Kadokawa Shoten. 2015. ASIN B015H35TM8.

Specific
