= Angel Beats! =

Japanese anime television series

- Cover art of the Angel Beats! DVD compilation set released by Sentai Filmworks, featuring main characters (from left to right) Yuzuru Otonashi, Yuri Nakamura and Kanade Tachibana
- Genre: Action; Comedy drama; Fantasy
- Created by: Jun Maeda
- Anime television series
- Directed by: Seiji Kishi
- Produced by: Kenji Horikawa; Hiro Maruyama; Yōsuke Toba
- Written by: Jun Maeda
- Music by: Jun Maeda; Anant-Garde Eyes
- Studio: P.A. Works
- Licensed by: AUS: Siren Visual; NA: Sentai Filmworks (former); Aniplex of America (current); UK: Manga Entertainment
- Original network: CBC, BS11, MBS, RKB, TBS, TUT
- Original run: April 3, 2010 – June 26, 2010
- Episodes: 13
- Print media
- Light novel: Angel Beats! Track Zero; Manga: Angel Beats! The 4-koma: Bokura no Sensen Kōshinkyoku; Angel Beats! Heaven's Door; Angel Beats! The 4-koma: Osora no Shinda Sekai kara; Angel Beats! The Last Operation
- Original video animation

Angel Beats! Stairway to Heaven
- Directed by: Seiji Kishi
- Studio: P.A. Works
- Licensed by: AUS: Siren Visual; NA: Sentai Filmworks; UK: Manga Entertainment
- Released: December 22, 2010
- Runtime: 24 minutes
- Original video animation

Angel Beats! Hell's Kitchen
- Directed by: Seiji Kishi
- Studio: P.A. Works
- Released: June 24, 2015
- Runtime: 29 minutes
- Related
- Angel Beats! 1st Beat (visual novel)
- icon

Angel Beats! is a 13-episode Japanese anime television series produced by P.A. Works and directed by Seiji Kishi. The story was originally conceived by Jun Maeda, who also wrote the screenplay and composed the music with the group Anant-Garde Eyes, with original character design by Na-Ga; both Maeda and Na-Ga are from the visual novel brand Key, who produced such titles as Kanon, Air, and Clannad. The anime aired in Japan between April 3 and June 26, 2010, on CBC. An original video animation (OVA) episode was released in December 2010, and a second OVA was released in June 2015. The story takes place in the afterlife and focuses on Otonashi, a boy who lost his memories of his life after dying. He is enrolled into the afterlife school and meets a girl named Yuri who invites him to join the Afterlife Battlefront, an organization she leads which fights against the student council president Kanade Tachibana, a girl also known as Angel with supernatural powers.

Key worked in collaboration with Dengeki G's Magazine published by ASCII Media Works to produce the project into a media franchise. Four manga series are serialized in Dengeki G's Magazine and Dengeki G's Comic: two illustrated by Haruka Komowata and two drawn by Yuriko Asami. A series of illustrated short stories written by Maeda and illustrated by GotoP were also serialized in Dengeki G's Magazine between the November 2009 and May 2010 issues. Two Internet radio shows were produced to promote Angel Beats!. A visual novel adaptation titled Angel Beats! 1st Beat was produced by Key and released for Windows on June 26, 2015.

Angel Beats! received generally positive reviews from critics. The integration of various individual elements together, such as musical performances, humor and action, was commended in one review but panned in another, saying that the story was overloaded with too many elements. P.A. Works was praised for the animation of the action sequences and attention to detail with the weapons used. A major flaw noted by critics, however, was the length of the anime, with its short run leaving many of the characters' back-stories unexplored. The anime was selected as a recommended work by the awards jury of the 14th Japan Media Arts Festival in 2010.

== Plot ==
Angel Beats! is set in the environment of a high school in the afterlife, a type of limbo for people who have experienced trauma or hardships in life and must overcome them before passing on and being reincarnated. The story follows Yuzuru Otonashi, a boy with amnesia who ends up in the afterlife. He meets Yuri Nakamura, a girl who invites him to join the Afterlife Battlefront (死んだ世界戦線, Shinda Sekai Sensen), or SSS, an organization she founded and leads which rebels against an unseen God for their unfair circumstances in life. Their enemy is Angel, the student council president, who has supernatural powers and is believed to be God's associate. After joining the SSS, Otonashi meets other members, including Hideki Hinata, the co-founder; Masami Iwasawa, the lead vocalist of a four-girl rock band, Girls Dead Monster (GDM); and Yui, a younger fan of GDM. Other than the SSS members, the afterlife is populated by fabricated students and teachers, whom Yuri refers to as "non-player characters" (NPCs).

Otonashi participates in several SSS operations and missions, despite still questioning the morality of their actions. During one of GDM's diversion concerts, Iwasawa passes on from the afterlife after achieving satisfaction through her music. After the SSS manages to demote Angel from her position, Otonashi partially regains his memories with the aid of deputy president Ayato Naoi's hypnosis. He later befriends Angel, whose real name is Kanade Tachibana, and remembers the rest of his past while in her presence. Otonashi helps her make peace with the SSS and learns of the afterlife's true purpose. He subsequently offers to aid Kanade in helping other SSS members to pass on, and Kanade is reinstated as student council president in accordance with their plan. They are joined by Hinata and Naoi, with the former helping Yui move on by fulfilling her desire for marriage.

Mysterious shadow-like entities begin appearing, attacking the residents of the afterlife by turning them into NPCs. Otonashi reasons with the other SSS members and many of them agree to pass on in lieu of becoming an NPC. Yuri destroys the source of the shadows, which were created by computers programmed to activate when love was detected in the afterlife to prevent it from becoming a paradise. Her affection for the members of the SSS allow her to finally overcome her regret, and by this time, the only other ones who have not passed on are Otonashi, Kanade, Hinata and Naoi. The five remaining students hold a graduation ceremony before Naoi, Yuri and Hinata pass on leaving only Otonashi and Kanade.

Otonashi confesses to Kanade that he has fallen in love with her and wants them to remain in the afterlife to help others move on. However, Kanade reveals that her regret was being unable to thank her heart's donor, Otonashi, for extending her life. Otonashi is heartbroken after she thanks him and passes on, leaving him alone in the afterlife. Later, two people resembling Otonashi and Kanade encounter each other on the street in the real world. In an alternate epilogue, Otonashi becomes the high school's student council president and helps lost souls depart from the afterlife while waiting to see Kanade again.

== Characters ==
The characters of Angel Beats! (from left): Irie, Sekine, Takamatsu, Matsushita, TK, Naoi, Otonashi, Yuri, Kanade, Noda, Hinata, Yui, Ōyama, Fujimaki, Iwasawa, Hisako, Takeyama, Shiina, and Yusa

=== Main ===
Yuzuru Otonashi (音無 結弦, Otonashi Yuzuru)
Voiced by: Hiroshi Kamiya (Japanese); Blake Shepard (English)
Due to his past, Otonashi has a caring personality and does not want anyone to experience pain or sadness. After dying, he lost his memories of the time when he was still alive, but later regains them. He had a younger sister, Hatsune (初音; Voiced by: Mai Nakahara (Japanese); Jessica Boone (English)), who died of an unknown but debilitating illness and whom he cared for very much. When she died, he decided to go to school to become a doctor, but died in a train accident before he could take the entrance exam to college. Initially unskilled in any equipment, he starts to practice his marksmanship, and pulls through for the team when they are in danger. For his weapon, he carries a Glock 17. Before graduating, he confesses to Kanade, and passes on, but it is shown he meets a person like her once more and it can be heavily implied that he reunites with Kanade.
Yuri Nakamura (仲村 ゆり, Nakamura Yuri)
Voiced by: Harumi Sakurai (Japanese); Brittney Karbowski (English)
Yuri, also known as Yurippe (ゆりっぺ), has a determined personality but is secretly very sensitive and protective. She invites Otonashi to join the SSS, an organization she founded and leads which fights against God. She is smart and decisive when making operations and decisions. She carries a silver Beretta 92. Not only is she skilled with a gun, but she is also capable in close range hand-to-hand combat, which is shown when she fends off Kanade's hand sonic with a combat knife. She vowed to fight against God after her three younger siblings were murdered by burglars looking for valuables and never forgave herself for failing to prevent their deaths. She is an effective leader, but does not think so. She regrets even fighting with Kanade later in the story, because she feels she could have been great friends with her. She disappears after the graduation ceremony.
Kanade Tachibana (立華 かなで, Tachibana Kanade)
Voiced by: Kana Hanazawa (Japanese); Emily Neves (English)
Kanade, initially known as Angel (天使, Tenshi), is the student council president at the afterlife school. This places her at odds with the SSS as her responsibilities require her to suppress delinquency and other disruptive activities that the team does. The SSS initially calls her Angel since they do not know her real name, but they still refer to her by it even after finding out her real name to be Kanade Tachibana. It is difficult to understand what she is thinking due to her rarely showing any outward emotions and her way of talking bluntly. She is personally dedicated to helping others overcome their regrets and move on. However, she often lacks a proper understanding of others, as she never thinks to try to explain to the SSS why she was doing what she did. She enjoys eating mapo doufu, a spicy dish. Despite her gentle demeanor and small frame, she is incredibly powerful and near indestructible to the point of ejecting bullets out of her wounds during battle. She creates her powers known as "guard skills" via a computer program called Angel Player. Her primary ability is "hand sonic", a blade on one or both forearms with five forms. Other skills include but are not limited to: "distortion", an invisible barrier that deflects bullets or other projectiles; "delay", which creates an after-image to disorient opponents; and "harmonics", where a clone with a consciousness of its own is formed from the original. These abilities are activated at will; however, her ability "overdrive", which gives her great physical strength, is always on.
Hideki Hinata (日向 秀樹, Hinata Hideki)
Voiced by: Ryōhei Kimura (Japanese); David Matranga (English)
Hinata is a bright, dependable guy who is the closest to Otonashi. He always tries to save his friends if he can and is a reliable force in the team. He and Yui constantly irritate one another on a daily basis, but deep down, he cares for Yui, as shown when he helps her pass on by telling her he would marry her. He is a talented baseball player, and his regret in life was his failure to catch a baseball, which cost his team an important baseball game. He nicknamed Yuri as Yurippe when they co-founded the SSS as he did not feel comfortable calling her Yuri, because his mother has the same name. He has shown romantic feelings towards Yuri in Track Zero, although he finds himself getting attracted to Yui much later in the series. He died from getting hit by a truck. He uses an RPK-74 and an S&W 645.
Ayato Naoi (直井 文人, Naoi Ayato)
Voiced by: Megumi Ogata (Japanese); Greg Ayres (English)
Naoi is a human originally thought to be a non-player character (non-human). After he died, Naoi developed hypnotic powers that allow him to control others and cause them to enter a dream-like state. In life, he was the son of a famous potter. However, it was his twin brother who had the talent in pottery and as a result, Naoi was ignored by everyone, including his own parents. When his brother died, he was made to replace him by his father and was given strict training in pottery, even getting scolded harshly if he messed up. As a result, he felt as if his own life was fake and all he wanted was to be acknowledged for his own existence. He later befriends Otonashi after he acknowledges him and joins the SSS. As acting student council president for a time and self-proclaimed God, Naoi is strict and arrogant, but this is quick to disperse when Otonashi chastises him. He is affectionate to Otonashi, much to the latter's chagrin, and always tries to earn his affection. He uses dual USP 45 handguns.
Yui Yoshioka (芳岡 ユイ, Yoshioka Yui)
Voiced by: Eri Kitamura (Japanese); Hilary Haag (English), LiSA (singing)
Yui is a big fan and initially an assistant to Girls Dead Monster. She is known to be hyperactive and talks extremely fast. Hinata finds Yui annoying, which results in bouts between the two of them though in truth, they truly care about one another, saying that had they met before they died, they would have fallen in love with one another. She wears a devil tail and shackle bracelets on her wrists, giving her an image of an imp or devil. She also has wings hidden by her hair on her back. After Iwasawa's departure, Yui becomes the new rhythm guitarist and vocalist of Girls Dead Monster, as well as its leader. Yui plays a Gibson SG Special electric guitar. She later becomes a part of the main SSS, following them along on missions, though she does not contribute much. In life, she was hit by a car and was paralyzed from a young age as a result. Her regret was not being able to do anything with her body. Otonashi helps fulfill most of her wishes that include many things she saw on TV when she was alive, although it is Hinata who fulfills her last desire to be married by proposing to her.

=== Supporting ===
Takamatsu (高松)
Voiced by: Takahiro Mizushima (Japanese); Kalob Martinez (eps. 1–7), Illich Guardiola (eps. 8–13) (English)
Takamatsu is an honor student who has a polite personality and wears glasses. He mainly contributes to the SSS through intelligence gathering and other affairs but does not actively fight. Yuri herself says to not be fooled by his glasses and that he is actually an idiot. Though appearing to be slender, he works out and is actually well-built muscle-wise. After he first reveals this, he tends to take his shirt off, much to everyone's discomfort. He is absorbed by a shadow and is turned into an NPC. However, having strong enough feelings (according to Yuri), he is able to regain his senses and manages to disappear like the others. He carries a Desert Eagle as a side-arm, but is also seen using a Sig 552.
Noda (野田)
Voiced by: Shun Takagi (Japanese); Leraldo Anzaldua (English)
Noda is a self-reliant young man who executes the strategies formed by the SSS and fights with a halberd. He does not listen to anyone other than Yuri, for whom he has adoration, and is antagonistic to almost everyone else. He has a one-sided rivalry with Otonashi. He is a complete idiot whose weakness is education; at one point, Takeyama is able to knock him out by reciting pi. He is not afraid to harm or kill anyone who gets in Yuri's way. Though he prefers to fight with his halberd, he sometimes uses guns out of necessity, the type of weaponry that he hates.
Eri Shiina (椎名 枝里, Shiina Eri)
Voiced by: Fūko Saitō (Japanese); Melissa Davis (English)
Shiina is a female ninja who fights with dual-wielding kodachi and shuriken. She is able to sense when danger is coming and is a highly capable fighter. Despite her serious demeanor, she has a weakness for cute things like stuffed animals. She is strict in her training and is very self-critical when she fails, especially to a newcomer like Otonashi. She decides that her weakness is having little concentration. She is shown balancing a broom and other objects with her fingers for long amounts of time. She rarely speaks but will normally remark "how shallow-minded" or "how foolish" ("this is so stupid" in the English dub) whenever the obvious or something stupid is said. As she did not have a name when she arrived in the afterlife, Yuri named her Shiina after her callsign, 'C7' (Shi-nana).
Yusa (遊佐)
Voiced by: Yui Makino (Japanese); Serena Varghese (eps. 1–9), Elizabeth Bunch (ep. 10, OVA) (English)
Yusa is an operator in the SSS who conveys the state of the battlefield to Yuri. She is a calm and gentle-mannered girl with a straightforward character. Much like Kanade, she does not express her emotions and is called scary by Otonashi and Hinata. She cannot calm down without her earphone. She rarely talks, and she sometimes hurts others' feelings even though she does not mean it.
Fujimaki (藤巻)
Voiced by: Yūki Masuda (Japanese); Andrew Love (English)
Fujimaki is a delinquent who fights with a long shirasaya, and he is similar in character to Noda. He picks on Otonashi when he initially joins the SSS. He cannot swim. He uses a PPSh-41 submachine gun.
TK
Voiced by: Michael Rivas (Japanese); Adam Van Wagoner (English)
TK is a mysterious character who wears a large bandanna over his eyes and tends to break out in dance every so often. No one knows his real name or past. He speaks in semi-nonsensical English phrases depending on the situation, mainly quoted from pop culture, but apparently does not know English fluently. He saves the team many times and does know some Japanese but rarely speaks it. He carries Browning Hi-Power and LAR Grizzly handguns or a PP-19 Bizon submachine gun during missions. His name TK, given to him by Noda, is an abbreviation of tonikaku kiteru (とにかくきてる; lit. He comes somehow or other).
Matsushita (松下)
Voiced by: Eiichirō Tokumoto (Japanese); Rob Mungle (English)
Matsushita, also known as "Matsushita 5-dan" ("Matsushita the Fifth" in the dub), has a large build and is a master at judo. He never forgets a debt he owes, especially when it involves food (specifically niku udon). He carries heavy weapons such as rocket launchers or machine guns into battle. He later loses weight after training in the mountains. He uses a H&K P7 and an MG3 light machine gun.
Ōyama (大山)
Voiced by: Yumiko Kobayashi (Japanese); Corey Hartzog (English)
Ōyama is an ordinary boy who has no special talents. He does not excel at anything, but is as capable as any normal person; in other words, he is a Jack of all trades. He is an innocent boy whose feelings are hurt by things like making a fake confession or watching his teammates "die". He carries a Remington 700 sniper rifle or a P226 handgun.
Takeyama (竹山)
Voiced by: Mitsuhiro Ichiki (Japanese); Dylan Godwin (English)
Takeyama is an intelligent boy who is good at hacking computers. He wrote the "Briefing Manager" program that Yuri uses to brief the SSS prior to a mission. He insists that he be addressed by his username "Christ," but no one ever does so. He tries to execute all plans as perfectly as possible. He does not engage in combat or any other physical operations, but rather gathers data and information.
Chaa (チャー)
Voiced by: Hiroki Tōchi (Japanese); Illich Guardiola (English)
Chaa is the leader of the Guild. Despite looking much older, he is about the same age as Otonashi and the others. He is the fourth member to join the SSS, at which time he had no facial hair. He first met Yuri and Hinata by holding the principal of the school hostage at gunpoint in an attempt to learn more about God, causing him to get stabbed by Kanade.

==== Girls Dead Monster ====
Masami Iwasawa (岩沢 まさみ, Iwasawa Masami)
Voiced by: Miyuki Sawashiro (Japanese); Luci Christian (English), Marina (singing)
Masami Iwasawa is the original leader of Girls Dead Monster who is in charge of the vocals and is the rhythm guitarist. She also writes the lyrics and composes the music for the band's songs. She plays a Sienna Sunburst/Maple Fender Stratocaster guitar. While usually a quiet girl, she is able to fascinate listeners by striving to create music that speaks her thoughts. She used music as an escape from her constantly fighting parents in life, but ended up dying from a brain injury she received from her father. She disappears playing her own song, "My Song". She accepts that she will use her voice to someday influence others.
Hisako (ひさ子)
Voiced by: Chie Matsuura (Japanese); Elizabeth Bunch (eps. 3–4), Jessica Boone (eps. 5–6, 12, OVA) (English)
Hisako is second-in-command of Girls Dead Monster who plays a Fender Jazzmaster electric guitar as lead guitarist. She has a candid personality and likes to play mahjong, which she has incredible luck with. As noted by Hinata, Hisako is also athletic and is greatly admired by Yui for her guitar riffs. In life, she was a part of a band whose main vocalist ended up committing suicide, but after meeting Iwasawa, she forms Girls Dead Monster with her.
Miyuki Irie (入江 みゆき, Irie Miyuki)
Voiced by: Kana Asumi (Japanese); Luci Christian (English)
Irie is the drummer of Girls Dead Monster who, despite being dead herself, is bad with hearing stories about ghosts or spirits, which Sekine likes to take advantage of. She is best friends with Sekine and joined Girls Dead Monster at the same time as her.
In a collaboration event with Heaven Burns Red, Miyuki is revealed to have been the student council president when she was alive. Due to the paranoia caused by pranks done to her by three other student council members, she accidentally jumped off a running train. This caused the members to think Miyuki's death was caused by them.
Shiori Sekine (関根 しおり, Sekine Shiori)
Voiced by: Emiri Katō (Japanese); Serena Varghese (English)
Sekine plays a G&L L-2000 bass guitar in Girls Dead Monster. She likes to play pranks on those around her to see the surprised faces of her victims. She also likes to abruptly improvise during performances, much to Hisako's chagrin. She is privately jealous of the attention Iwasawa gets as the leader and center of the band.

== Production ==
=== Creation and conception ===
The original creators of Angel Beats!, Jun Maeda and Na-Ga of Key, were interviewed in the July 2009 issue of ASCII Media Works' Dengeki G's Magazine. Around the time Key completed the first release of their sixth visual novel Little Busters!, Yōsuke Toba of Aniplex (himself a fan of Key's works) approached Maeda around October 2007 about collaborating to produce an original anime series. Maeda began meeting with Toba and Aniplex on a monthly basis and the story started to gradually progress. Aniplex wanted Maeda to write a screenplay that would be very "Key-like, with touching moments of laughter and tears," but initially Maeda found himself at a loss to write a story more amusing than Little Busters!, because he thought that he had reached a limit with Little Busters! in regards to a "Key-like story". However, one day Maeda was struck by inspiration, where he thought up the initial idea of a story set in the afterlife. Furthermore, with everyone already dead, Maeda conceived of flashy battles where the combatants go all out without fear of death. According to Maeda, the theme of the series is "life", which in Angel Beats! is depicted as a precious and wonderful thing, despite the characters in Angel Beats! who fight against their fate.

Maeda nominated Na-Ga to begin work on the character designs near the beginning of 2008. Na-Ga was worried that other computer graphics (CG) work for Key would get delayed, but he took the position because of his accumulated experience in CG. Maeda nominated Na-Ga because of the popular characters he designed in Little Busters!, and because of his frankness. Na-Ga designed Yuri based on her personality as a leader, though it was per Maeda's request that he added the black headband, taken from the character Yukiko Amagi from Persona 4, who was Maeda's favorite heroine from that game. The length of Yuri's hair and the addition of a green ribbon were decided at production committee meetings. Angel's original concept began with the idea of a brave, fighting girl. Maeda cited that Angel's image had changed considerably over the development process and that originally she was similar to Shiki Ryōgi from Kara no Kyōkai. Eventually, Angel's concept changed to being a "silent and mysterious girl". Before Na-Ga decided on Otonashi's design, Maeda told him that anything would be fine and to just draw something, and eventually drew up a prototype for Otonashi and Hinata, among others. Some of the characters had vague initial conditions given by Maeda, such as asking Na-Ga to draw an "all female band bass guitarist" in the case of Girls Dead Monster member Sekine and particularly the cryptic "character who speaks in puzzling English phrases" for TK.

=== Development ===
The Aniplex producer of Angel Beats!, Yōsuke Toba, was interviewed in the November 2009 issue of Dengeki G's Magazine, where he commented that a 13-episode anime with about 21 minutes per episode was not enough to tell the whole story of Angel Beats! Maeda had envisioned. Therefore, the various additional media, such as the illustrated short stories and manga, contain some of the story that was unable to make it into the anime because of time constraints. Toba wanted fans of the series to be able to enjoy it to the fullest by exploring all of the media types. Maeda found it tiring to go back and forth between Osaka and Tokyo for business meetings when he was in the process of writing the script, and found it difficult to write an entire script by himself, since he had never done that before with any of the games he produced as a member of Key. It was only after the script was done that Maeda was able to work on the music, which he greatly enjoyed and never tired of it. Maeda composed about 15 songs for Girls Dead Monster and spent about two days each composing each song. He made sure to create songs for Girls Dead Monster that high school girls would compose, including the lyrics. Due to this, Maeda pointed out that the opening and ending theme songs for Angel Beats!, which Maeda also composed, sound like they were composed by a different person compared to the Girls Dead Monster songs.

In regards to bringing in P.A. Works as the animation studio, Toba had taken notice of the company back when they provided in-between animation and production assistance for Fullmetal Alchemist (2003–4) and Darker than Black (2007), respectively; Aniplex helped produce both series. After watching just the first three episodes of P.A. Works' True Tears (2008), however, he was shocked at the high quality and immediately went to P.A. Works' studio in Toyama Prefecture to meet with the production staff in the hope that one day Aniplex could collaborate with them on a project together. The following week, Maeda brought up the subject of deciding on an animation studio for Angel Beats! and mentioned that he too had seen True Tears and had become interested in P.A. Works. Shortly after that, Toba formally made the proposal to P.A. Works to animate the project.

Maeda focused on making jokes an important part of Angel Beats!, leading Toba to seek out Seiji Kishi to be the director, because of his experience in directing and his pulling power influence on the staff of P.A. Works, where there are many that are still young. Kishi was ultimately approached by P.A. Works representative director Kenji Horikawa about working on a "school comedy written by a game scenario writer" and was shocked after taking the director's position to discover Maeda was the screenwriter. Kishi commented how, far from just being a comedy, the series contains many different aspects, including flashy action scenes, live musical performances, and drama. Kishi stated that normally he would be hard pressed to cover this range of aspects, but was motivated by Maeda's uncompromising attitude in regards to the script. The decision to add in the all female band Girls Dead Monster was due to Maeda's intent to add in many different and interesting elements into the series.

Kishi specifically requested that sound and music director Satoki Iida work on the project, who also helped with the proofreading of the script due to Maeda's fixation on the music production. Iida was interviewed in the April 2010 issue of Dengeki G's Magazine, where it was stated that Maeda and the group Anant-Garde Eyes received Iida's approval to employ a minimalist approach to the background music (BGM) used throughout the anime. Iida admitted that it was uncustomary to use this music genre in anime and that he had to go through various trials and errors with Maeda and Anant-Garde Eyes to get the music right. Maeda and Anant-Garde Eyes strove to create individual quality music tracks, while Iida pursued the goal of having music that would be useful as BGM tracks, which caused problems during the creation process. Iida realized that it was important for the music and the visuals to combine to create a synchronization between the two. Toba first took notice of Angel Beats! character designer and chief animator Katsuzō Hirata during the production of Gurren Lagann (2007) with his skill as an artist and ability to finish work quickly, but thoroughly. It was after Toba saw Hirata's work as chief animator of Strike Witches (2008), however, that he pursued Hirata to join the Angel Beats! staff; Maeda also gave his seal of approval to Hirata.

== Broadcast and distribution ==
The 13-episode Angel Beats! anime television series is directed by Seiji Kishi and produced by P.A. Works and Aniplex. It aired in Japan between April 3 and June 26, 2010, on the CBC television network. The first episode was previewed on March 22, 2010, to a selected number of people who participated in a lottery held earlier that month. The screenplay was written by Jun Maeda, who originally conceived the series. Chief animator Katsuzō Hirata based the character design used in the anime on Na-Ga's original designs. Sound and music direction was headed by Satoki Iida.

The series was released in seven BD/DVD compilation volumes between June 23 and December 22, 2010, in limited and regular editions. Three drama CDs, written by Maeda and performed by the anime's cast, were released with the first, fourth and sixth limited edition BD/DVD volumes. The seventh BD/DVD volume featured an original video animation (OVA) episode, as well as a bonus short which serves as another epilogue to the series. Each of the BD/DVD volumes contained commentaries by the characters performed by the voice cast and written by Maeda. A BD box set was released in Japan on June 24, 2015, and also included another OVA episode. Sentai Filmworks licensed the anime, along with distributor Section23 Films, released the series on BD/DVD on July 26, 2011. Crunchyroll later added the series to its catalog in the Americas in 2012, later in the United Kingdom and Ireland in 2019. Siren Visual licensed the anime for Australia and New Zealand. The series has also been licensed in the United Kingdom by Manga Entertainment and released the series on BD/DVD on June 25, 2012. In November 2017, Sentai Filmworks announced the release of the series would go out-of-print, and the series was later removed from their catalogue and online streaming service Hidive, before it was relicensed by Aniplex of America.

=== Music ===
The anime's music is composed by Maeda and the group Anant-Garde Eyes, who also provided the musical arrangement. The music is released on Key's record label Key Sounds Label. The opening theme is "My Soul, Your Beats!" sung by Lia and the ending theme is "Brave Song" sung by Aoi Tada. The single containing both songs titled "My Soul, Your Beats! / Brave Song" was released on May 26, 2010, in limited (CD+DVD) and regular (CD) editions; the limited edition's DVD contains the opening and ending videos without the credits. The in-story band Girls Dead Monster is made up of the real-life singers Marina as Masami Iwasawa and LiSA as Yui. Five singles for Girls Dead Monster were released in 2010. The first, "Crow Song", was released on April 23 featuring songs sung by Iwasawa (Marina). The second and third singles, "Thousand Enemies" and "Little Braver", followed on May 12 and June 9, respectively, with songs sung by Yui (LiSA). The fourth single was "Last Song" by Iwasawa (Marina) and the fifth single was "Ichiban no Takaramono (Yui final ver.)" (一番の宝物～Yui final ver.～) by Yui (LiSA); both singles were released on December 8. A Girls Dead Monster album titled Keep The Beats! was released on June 30, 2010. A version of Keep The Beats! containing instrumental tracks was released on July 28, 2010, bundled with a 256-page band score book. The anime's original soundtrack was released on July 28, 2010, as a two-CD set. A Girls Dead Monster mini-album titled Rare Tracks was released on December 28, 2014.

==== Events ====
There were several live performance events to promote the music from Angel Beats!. The first was on April 24, 2010, at the Tower Records in Shibuya, Tokyo where Marina and LiSA performed four songs. The first two, "Crow Song" and "Alchemy", were duets, while the third song "My Song" was sung by Marina, and LiSA sang "My Soul, Your Beats!". On June 5, 2010, at the same venue, Lia and Aoi Tada sang their songs from "My Soul, Your Beats! / Brave Song", Tada and LiSA sang "Crow Song" as a duet, and Lia and LiSA also sang "My Soul, Your Beats!" as a duet for the encore. An event titled "Angel Beats! Fes.: Thousand Bravers" was held on August 1, 2010, at Studio Coast in Shingiba, Koto, Tokyo featuring singers Lia, Tada, Marina, LiSA and Karuta, as well as several voice actors from the anime.

A national concert tour featuring LiSA titled "Girls Dead Monster starring LiSA Tour 2010: Keep The Angel Beats!" was held across Japan on August 3 and September 2, 2010; all of the venues ultimately sold out. A BD/DVD video album box set titled Girls Dead Monster starring LiSA Tour 2010 Final: Keep The Angel Beats! of the tour's final performance was released on June 1, 2011, by Key Sounds Label bearing the catalog numbers KSLV-0001–0003. The last concert of Girls Dead Monster was held on December 27, 2010, at an event called "Girls Dead Monster Last Live: Final Operation" featuring Marina and LiSA at the Tokyo International Forum.

== Related media ==
=== Internet radio shows ===
A four-episode Internet radio show to promote Angel Beats! called Jun Maeda's Brutal Radio (麻枝准の殺伐ラジオ, Maeda Jun no Satsubatsu Rajio) aired between May 30, 2009, and March 31, 2010. The show was hosted by Jun Maeda, though guests did make appearances, such as Yōsuke Toba, one of the series' producers, and Na-Ga. One month after each regular broadcast, an additional shorter broadcast called Postwar Disposition (戦後処理, Sengo Shori) was released. Another Internet radio show to promote the series titled Angel Beats! SSS Radio had a pre-broadcast on March 18, 2010, and had 51 regular weekly broadcasts between April 1, 2010, and March 31, 2011. Produced by Hibiki Radio Station, the show was hosted by Harumi Sakurai (the voice of Yuri), Kana Hanazawa (the voice of Angel) and Eri Kitamura (the voice of Yui). Seven CD compilation volumes containing all 51 episodes were released between June 23, 2010, and July 29, 2011.

=== Books and publications ===
A series of seven illustrated short stories written by Jun Maeda and drawn by GotoP titled Angel Beats! Track Zero was serialized between the November 2009 and May 2010 issues of ASCII Media Works's Dengeki G's Magazine. Track Zero is a prequel to Angel Beats! featuring Hinata as the main character and tells the story of how the SSS was formed. A special extra chapter focusing on Girls Dead Monster was published in the sixth volume of Dengeki G's Festival! Deluxe on March 29, 2010. The short stories were collected into a bound volume released on June 23, 2010, and included an additional chapter along with the other eight chapters. The chapter titles for the stories are taken from song titles from various musical artists. The first chapter was posted online with illustrations by ASCII Media Works. ASCII Media Works published the Angel Beats! Official Guidebook on December 22, 2010. The guidebook contains story summaries of the anime episodes including the OVA, information on the cast of characters, interviews from the voice acting cast and production staff, and illustrations featuring art from the anime.

No.	Title	Release date	ISBN
–	Angel Beats! Track Zero	June 23, 2010	978-4-04-868680-8
Chapter 1: "A Rocket For Two" (二人のロケット, Futari no Roketto; "Futari no Rocket"); Chapter 2: "Navy Blue"; Chapter 3: "Meltdown" (メルトダウン, Merutodaun); Chapter 4: "Cold Summer"; Chapter 5: "Man Like Creatures"; Chapter 6: "By My Side" (バイ・マイ・サイ, Bai Mai Sai); Chapter 7: "Eve of War" (開戦前夜, Kaisen Zenya); Extra Chapter 1: "The Early Hours of Monday" (月曜日の未明, Getsuyōbi no Mimei); Extra Chapter 2: "The Early Hours of Monday II" (月曜日の未明II, Getsuyōbi no Mimei II)

=== Manga ===
A four-panel comic strip manga, illustrated by Haruka Komowata and titled Angel Beats! The 4-koma: Bokura no Sensen Kōshinkyoku (Angel Beats! The4コマ 僕らの戦線行進曲♪, Angel Beats! The 4-koma: Our Battlefront March Song), was serialized between the December 2009 and October 2013 issues of ASCII Media Works' Dengeki G's Magazine. Komowata was also in charge of illustrating a manga which showcased the progress of the Angel Beats! project and was serialized between the September 2009 and July 2010 issues of Dengeki G's Magazine. Four tankōbon volumes for Angel Beats! The 4-koma were released between December 18, 2010, and November 27, 2013, under ASCII Media Works' Dengeki Comics EX imprint. An anthology titled Angel Beats! Comic Anthology was published by ASCII Media Works on December 18, 2010. Komowata also illustrated the Angel Beats! The 4-koma: Osora no Shinda Sekai kara (Angel Beats! The4コマ お空の死んだ世界から) four-panel comic strip manga, which was serialized between the December 2013 and January 2016 issues of Dengeki G's Magazine. Two volumes were released between October 24, 2014, and April 26, 2016.

A manga illustrated by Yuriko Asami, titled Angel Beats! Heaven's Door, began serialization in Dengeki G's Magazine in the May 2010 issue. The manga ended serialization in the magazine's May 2014 issue and continued serialization in Dengeki G's Comic between the June 2014 and December 2016 issues. Heaven's Door is based on the Angel Beats! Track Zero short stories. ASCII Media Works published 11 volumes for Angel Beats! Heaven's Door between December 18, 2010, and December 17, 2016. Heaven's Door was available in English on Kadokawa Corporation's ComicWalker website and app, and was licensed in North America by Seven Seas Entertainment, but only the first volume was released. Asami also illustrates the Angel Beats! The Last Operation manga, which began serialization in the October 2017 issue of Dengeki G's Comic. Dengeki G's Comic ceased publication with the May 2019 issue sold on March 30, 2019, but The Last Operation continued on ComicWalker and Niconico Seiga in April 2019 until March 2020. Four volumes were released for The Last Operation between January 26, 2018, and March 27, 2020.

Angel Beats! The 4-koma: Bokura no Sensen Kōshinkyoku

No.	Release date	ISBN
1	December 18, 2010	978-4-04-870188-4
2	October 27, 2011	978-4-04-870901-9
3	October 27, 2012	978-4-04-891034-7
4	November 27, 2013	978-4-04-866177-5

Angel Beats! The 4-koma: Osora no Shinda Sekai kara

No.	Release date	ISBN
1	October 24, 2014	978-4-04-866933-7
2	April 26, 2016	978-4-04-865920-8

Angel Beats! Heaven's Door

No.	Original release date	Original ISBN	English release date	English ISBN
1	December 18, 2010	978-4-04-870188-4	February 9, 2016	978-1-62-692189-4
2	July 27, 2011	978-4-04-870720-6	—	—
3	February 27, 2012	978-4-04-886404-6	—	—
4	August 27, 2012	978-4-04-886884-6	—	—
5	April 27, 2013	978-4-04-891573-1	—	—
6	November 27, 2013	978-4-04-866033-4	—	—
7	June 27, 2014	978-4-04-866645-9	—	—
8	February 27, 2015	978-4-04-869296-0	—	—
9	August 27, 2015	978-4-04-865426-5	—	—
10	April 27, 2016	978-4-04-865917-8	—	—
11	December 17, 2016	978-4-04-892649-2	—	—

Angel Beats! The Last Operation

No.	Release date	ISBN
1	January 26, 2018	978-4-04-893605-7
2	October 25, 2018	978-4-04-912136-0
3	March 27, 2019	978-4-04-912441-5
4	March 27, 2020	978-4-04-913094-2

=== Visual novel ===
It was reported in 2010 that Jun Maeda was writing the scenario for a visual novel video game adaptation of Angel Beats!, and the game was officially announced in September 2013. Developed by Key, Maeda led the production team as the designer and one of the scenario writers. Two additional writers included Kai, who previously contributed to the scenario of Clannad, and Leo Kashida, who had worked on the scenario of Tomoyo After: It's a Wonderful Life and Little Busters!. The art director and character designer is Na-Ga. Rated for all ages, Angel Beats! 1st Beat was released on June 26, 2015, for Windows. The scenario covers up to the tenth episode of the anime as well as Iwasawa's, Matsushita's and Yui's routes with Otonashi as the main protagonist. Six total volumes were initially planned, with subsequent volumes covering the rest of the character routes. However, in the afterword of the 11th volume of Angel Beats! Heaven's Door released in December 2016, Maeda revealed that subsequent volumes had been cancelled, with the content that had been planned for future games used as a basis for the manga Angel Beats! The Last Operation.

== Reception ==
=== Critical reception ===
Angel Beats! received generally positive reviews. In a review by Anime News Network, reviewer Theron Martin praised the series for integrating individual elements together, including the Girls Dead Monster musical performance scenes, scenes where humor dominates, and action scenes. A common theme in supernatural anime, according to Martin, are souls discontent with their former lives, but the concept of Angel Beats! is described as "quite unusual" because it features all the main characters as such souls and gathers them in one place. In the series, "maintaining distinctiveness is essential for survival as an individual," which Martin calls a "sly condemnation of the rigorous conformity impressed upon students by Japanese schooling." Overall, Angel Beats! was lauded for "requir[ing] no great familiarity with anime to enjoy."

On the DVD Talk website, reviewer John Sinnott praised the plot for advancing and changing in unexpected ways: "The plot evolves quickly and by the end of the series it's quite a different show than what it was at the beginning." Both Martin and Sinnott agree that a major flaw in the anime is that it is too short, and does not go into detail for a large number of characters. Stig Høgset at THEM Anime Reviews, however, panned the series in part because it "overloads the story with too many elements in an attempt to please as many people as possible." Høgset went on to describe Angel Beats as not having "any compelling characters" and the series' humor is largely thought to be annoying. However, Høgset praised P.A. Works for the animation of the action sequences, as did Martin, who added that there is "great detail work on the weapons and instruments used." Writing in the third edition of The Anime Encyclopedia (2015), Jonathan Clements and Helen McCarthy noted the commercial and critical success of the franchise but also criticized the anime for attempting to accommodate too many potentially interesting characters within its thirteen-episode run. Nevertheless, they praised its emphasis on the importance of individuality for survival and its humorous appropriation of settings from Studio Ghibli films to depict Otonashi's imagined version of Angel's lair.

The sixth episode of Angel Beats!, which aired on May 8, 2010, on Osaka's MBS station in Japan, achieved a record 4.9% rating for an anime series broadcast during the late-night "Anime Shower" timeslot in the past three years. The Angel Beats! anime was selected as a recommended work by the awards jury of the 14th Japan Media Arts Festival in 2010.

=== Sales ===
Each of the Angel Beats! Blu-ray Disc (BD) compilation volumes ranked in the top three on Japan's Oricon weekly BD sales chart. Volumes one and four ranked at No. 1, volumes two and five ranked at No. 2, and volumes three, six and seven ranked at No. 3. The DVD volumes, however, ranked lower than the BDs on Oricon. Volume one ranked at No. 5, volume two at No. 10, volume three at No. 13, volume four at No. 11, volume five at No. 8, volume six at No. 12, and volume seven at No. 15.

The opening and ending theme song single "My Soul, Your Beats! / Brave Song" debuted at No. 3 on Japan's Oricon weekly singles chart, selling about 80,000 copies in its first week of sales. "My Soul, Your Beats! / Brave Song" was awarded a Gold disc by the Recording Industry Association of Japan (RIAJ) in May 2010 for shipping over 100,000 copies. Girls Dead Monster's single "Crow Song" debuted at No. 7 on the Oricon singles chart, selling approximately 16,400 copies in about four days. "Crow Song" sold over 25,000 more copies over the next three weeks after its release. "Crow Song" was awarded a Gold disc by the RIAJ in November 2011 for shipping over 100,000 copies. The Girls Dead Monster single "Thousand Enemies" debuted at No. 4 on the Oricon singles chart, selling about 28,000 copies in its first week of sales. "Thousand Enemies" sold over 18,000 more copies over the next two weeks after its release.

Girls Dead Monster's third single "Little Braver" debuted at No. 2 on the Oricon singles chart, selling about 38,800 copies in its first week of sales. Girls Dead Monster's fourth and fifth singles, "Last Song" and "Ichiban no Takaramono (Yui final ver.)", ranked at No. 2 and No. 3 on the Oricon singles chart, respectively, both selling about 35,000 copies in their first week of sales. The Girls Dead Monster album Keep The Beats! ranked at No. 6 on the Oricon albums chart, selling about 51,000 copies in its first week of sales. Keep The Beats! was awarded a Gold disc by the RIAJ in September 2010 for shipping over 100,000 copies. The version of Keep The Beats! with instrumental tracks and a band score book ranked at No. 14 on the Oricon albums chart, selling just under 9,000 copies in its first week. The Angel Beats! Original Soundtrack ranked at No. 9 on the Oricon albums chart, selling about 13,300 copies in its first week.
