= Na-Ga =

Japanese artist

- Education: Vocational school
- Known for: Visual novels
- Notable work: Little Busters! Angel Beats! Kud Wafter; Charlotte

Na-Ga is a male Japanese artist who is employed as a graphic designer and illustrator for the company Key known for such famous visual novels as Kanon, Air, and Clannad among others. Na-Ga has been working for Key since the production of Air as one of the computer graphic artists, but was able to majorly contribute to character design in Key's sixth visual novel Little Busters! with Itaru Hinoue, along with the later released Little Busters! Ecstasy and Kud Wafter. For Key's ninth title Rewrite, Na-Ga contributed to the game's computer graphics. Na-Ga worked in collaboration with Jun Maeda and ASCII Media Works' Dengeki G's Magazine to produce the mixed media projects Angel Beats! and Charlotte as the original character designer. Na-Ga once worked for the company Pearlsoft R between 1997 and 1999 where he contributed to the visual novels Sweet Days, and Hakanai Omoi: Anemone as the main artist, and on Watashi where he was credited as a graphic designer. He also participates in a dōjinshi circle named "from-D".
