= List of True Tears episodes =

The cover of the Japanese edition of the first DVD compilation featuring Noe Isurugi

This is a list of episodes of the 2008 Japanese animated television series True Tears. The episodes are directed by Junji Nishimura and produced by P.A. Works, Lantis, and Bandai Visual. P.A. Works produced the animation and Lantis was responsible for the production of the music. The anime, while sharing its title with the visual novel by La'cryma, has no relation to the visual novel; however, La'cryma is credited as the series' original creator. The story follows Shin'ichirō Nakagami, a high school student, who is unable to express his feelings for Hiromi Yuasa, a fellow high school student who was taken in by Shin'ichirō's parents after her father died, as well as his interactions with another student, Noe Isurugi, who enlists Shin'ichirō's aid in recovering her "tears."

The episodes aired from January 6, 2008, to March 29, 2008, on TV Kanagawa in Japan, although a special preview of the first episode was shown in Japan on January 4, 2008, on BS11 Digital. The episodes also aired at later dates on Chiba TV, Kansai TV, Kids Station, Tokai TV, TV Saitama, and BS11 Digital. The title for a given episode is a line spoken within the episode.

Two pieces of theme music are used for the episodes; one opening theme and one ending theme. The opening theme is "Reflectier" (リフレクティア, Rifurekutia) by Eufonius, and the ending theme is Aira Yūki's "Sekai no Namida" (セカイノナミダ). A single for "Reflectier" was released on January 23, 2008, and a single for "Sekai no Namida" was released on February 6, 2008.

A DVD compilation, containing the first two episodes of the anime, was released by Bandai Visual on March 25, 2008. Four more DVD compilations, each containing two episodes, have been announced for release between April 25, 2008, and July 25, 2008, respectively.

== Episode list ==
No.	Title	Original release date
1	"Because I Gave My Tears Away"; Transliteration: "Watashi... Namida, Agechatta Kara" (Japanese: 私...涙, あげちゃったから)	January 6, 2008
While at home, Shin'ichirō Nakagami laments how he cannot express his feelings for Hiromi Yuasa. He notes that when he knew her before he always treasured her smile, but now she acts coldly at home, and Shin'ichirō regrets not being able to see her tears or any form of significant emotion. At school, Shin'ichirō sees a girl named Noe Isurugi, and after criticizing her for interacting with chickens, is cursed by her. Shin'ichirō is quickly beset by bad luck for the rest of the day, and even sees Hiromi undressing to take a bath. To atone for what he said to Noe, he crafts a chicken out of a tissue box for her. The next day he gives the box to her, but she is saddened because one of the chickens, Raigōmaru, has been killed. As Shin'ichirō notes that she did not cry, she tells him she has given her tears away.
2	"What Do I Want to Do..."; Transliteration: "Watashi... Nani ga Shitai no..." (Japanese: 私...何がしたいの...)	January 13, 2008
After insisting Shin'ichirō should believe her about giving her away her tears, Noe tells him of her mission to retrieve them. At school the following day, Noe starts paying extra attention to Shin'ichirō, such as waving to him while in P.E., and giving him seeds previously intended for Raigōmaru. Hiromi notices this and tries to approach Noe on her own, but cannot communicate with her. Later, Hiromi asks Shin'ichirō to introduce her to Noe, but after Noe learns of this she approaches Hiromi herself. Noe instantly sees through her guise, and although she can tell that Hiromi does not like her, is not angered. Hiromi later recounts this meeting to Shin'ichirō, confirming that she did not want to be Noe's friend to begin with.
3	"How Did It Go? The Talk from the Other Day"; Transliteration: "Dō Natta? Konaida no Hanashi" (Japanese: どうなった? こないだの話)	January 20, 2008
When Shin'ichirō goes to school, he finds red seeds in pink envelopes which Noe has placed in his locker, desk, and around the classroom. When he goes confront her, he finds Noe being picked up by a boy he assumes is her boyfriend. The next day, he finds red seeds leading from his classroom to the tree outside where Noe is. He tries to tell her to stop, but Noe says that is not something for him to decide. She jumps out of the tree, and Shin'ichirō has to carry her to the boys' basketball game currently in action. The same boy Shin'ichirō saw pick Noe up after school is playing in the game, and it is revealed that he is her older brother. Shin'ichirō overhears Hiromi's friend, Tomoyo, ask her if she likes Shin'ichirō, but Hiromi says she in fact likes Noe's brother.
4	"Okay, Splashy Splashy"; Transliteration: "Hai, Pachipachitte Shite" (Japanese: はい, ぱちぱちってして)	January 27, 2008
While walking back to Shin'ichirō's house, Hiromi tells him about her crush on Noe's brother, which hurts Shin'ichirō. The next day, he leaves early in order to avoid Hiromi. Later, Aiko approaches him while he is resting on the seawall, and she eventually persuades him to go shopping with her. At lunch, Shin'ichirō tells Aiko about her giving him false hope in his relationship with Hiromi. Aiko tries to cheer Shin'ichirō up, but to no avail. When he goes home, Hiromi asks Shin'ichirō if he is avoiding her because of what happened, and Shin'ichirō replies in a way that hurts them both. The following day, Noe drags Shin'ichirō around town and explains why she is gathering tears, and in the process manages to cheer Shin'ichirō up. In the evening, Noe and her brother are buying in some food. In the morning, Shin'ichirō apologizes to Hiromi for the events of the previous day. Concentrating on the apology, he accidentally uses face wash instead of toothpaste when brushing his teeth; Hiromi and Shin'ichirō both laugh at this. Shin'ichirō is happy he was able to make her laugh. As he is walking out of his house, Noe's brother is waiting for Shin'ichirō and introduces himself as Jun Isurugi. They exchange greetings, and Shin'ichirō is stunned when Jun asks him to go out with Noe.
5	"A Meddlesome Guy is Like a Fool"; Transliteration: "Osekkai na Otokonokotte Baka Mitai" (Japanese: おせっかいな男の子ってバカみたい)	February 3, 2008
Shin'ichirō looks for Noe during school, but after she suggests they eat lunch together or go home together, he becomes defensive and lies, telling her that he has dance practice after school and that she should eat with her friends instead of him. After school another day, Noe drops in on Shin'ichirō in the middle of dance practice, and he later becomes inspired by her. Noe's older brother Jun pays Shin'ichirō another visit and during their exchange Shin'ichirō suggests that Jun go out with Hiromi if he is asking him to go out with Noe; Shin'ichirō becomes nervous that Jun may actually go through with it. Shin'ichirō goes to tell Hiromi about Jun saying she was cute, but she gets annoyed at Shin'ichirō for coming into her room to tell her something like that. Meanwhile, Aiko has started to knit a sweater for Miyokichi, but she is showing Shin'ichirō more affection than him.
6	"Is That...Some Kind of Joke?"; Transliteration: "Sore... Nan no Jōdan?" (Japanese: それ...何の冗談?)	February 10, 2008
Aiko tries to tell Shin'ichirō her feelings but is interrupted when Miyokichi arrives. While frustrated about Jun approaching Hiromi during school, Shin'ichirō asks Noe to stop bothering him for while and ends up getting his belt being pulled out by Noe. Miyokichi later goes shopping with Aiko and the latter stomps out of a shop flustered and tells Miyokichi that she bought the sweater that Shin'ichirō had picked up before. Miyokichi gets the hint and feels troubled. Jun goes out with Hiromi on a date Sunday, and after they arrive back at her home, Jun tells her that Shin'ichirō and Noe are going out together. Later that night, Shin'ichirō overhears Hiromi and his mother's quarrel and has a tussle with his mother and Hiromi. Subsequently, Shin'ichirō finds out from Hiromi that he and Hiromi might share the same father.
7	"Tell Me Clearly, Write It Down Here"; Transliteration: "Chanto Itte, Koko ni Kaite" (Japanese: ちゃんと言って, ここに書いて)	February 17, 2008
Noe once again tries to approach Shin'ichirō at school, but he shrugs her off, telling her that she does not understand his situation. Following this, Noe seeks out Hiromi but gets in a short fight with her while at school. Shin'ichirō realizes that Noe does like him a lot, due to all the attention she gives him, and after a little more persuasion from Jun, Shin'ichirō asks Noe to go out with him, albeit while somewhat embarrassed and looking away from her. Noe even asks him to say it again properly to her face, and write out "I love Noe" on the ground with stones. After school, Shin'ichirō goes to see Aiko at her shop, and when he tells her that he is now going out with Noe, Aiko rushes up to him and kisses him. While shedding tears, Aiko asks Shin'ichirō to consider her as well.
8	"The Town Where It Doesn't Snow"; Transliteration: "Yuki ga Futte Inai Machi" (Japanese: 雪が降っていない街)	February 24, 2008
After asking Noe out, Shin'ichirō tells her about his picture book that he is making about the rooster Raigōmaru. Aiko cannot get over what happened with her and Shin'ichirō. Noe's brother goes out on a date with Hiromi, and she finds out the true reason why Shin'ichirō is going out with Noe and also why she is going out with Noe's brother. Hiromi cuts her date short after she speaks her mind to Noe, though she realizes that she acted liked Shin'ichirō's mother since she shows resentment towards Noe. She asks Noe's brother to give her a ride to a "town where it does not snow" in order to get away from things.
9	"You're Having a Hard Time Flying..."; Transliteration: "Nakanaka Tobenai ne..." (Japanese: なかなか飛べないね...)	March 2, 2008
Jun and Hiromi crash while on the motorcycle, but they are not harmed. As a result of the accident, both Jun and Hiromi get suspended from school. Shin'ichirō's mother, who had previously shown hostile attitudes towards Hiromi, finally accepts her as her own child, and tells Hiromi that she made up the story about Hiromi being her husband's child. Shin'ichirō talks with Noe and gives her an update on the picture book. Noe hints that she knows where Shin'ichirō's true feelings lie, and she runs off back home.
10	"I'll Do Everything Properly"; Transliteration: "Zenbu Chanto Suru Kara" (Japanese: 全部ちゃんとするから)	March 9, 2008
Shin'ichirō hears from Miyokichi that he broke up with Aiko, even though he did not want to accept it at first. Miyokichi goes to Noe to try to get her to put a curse on him so that he does not fall in love with anyone again. Now that Hiromi knows she and Shin'ichirō are not siblings, she grows happier at home, and goes to see Jun to break off her relationship with him, but he does not want that. Noe visits Shinichiro at dance practice for the last time. Aiko finally gets over the fact that Shin'ichirō does not think of her in a romantic way and tells him that she is moving on from him. Hiromi decides to move out of Shin'ichirō's house, and as she is driven away in the moving truck, Shin'ichirō gets on his bike and races after her. When he finally catches up, Shin'ichirō slips and falls off the bike; the driver stops the truck and Hiromi runs out towards Shin'ichirō but trips and falls onto him. Shin'ichirō tells her that he will do everything properly from now on.
11	"I'm Not the Person You Like"; Transliteration: "Anata ga Suki na no wa Watashi ja Nai" (Japanese: あなたが好きなのは私じゃない)	March 16, 2008
It has been a week since Hiromi moved out and in the meantime has settled into single living. Miyokichi gets a call from Aiko, and the two decide to start over from the beginning as friends. During a basketball match where Hiromi is getting purposely fouled by the other team, Jun comes into the match and asks the opposing team what was the meaning of their behavior, which sparks interest from spectators. Hiromi meets with Jun in the park where he apologizes for what happened during the game. Hiromi once again tries to break it off with him, but he still does not want to. Noe does not come back home at night, and Jun calls Hiromi to tell Shin'ichirō about it, and he leaves to look for her. Shin'ichirō finds her at the beach with the chicken Jibeta.
12	"Through My Eyes That See Nothing"; Transliteration: "Nani mo Mitenai Watashi no Hitomi kara" (Japanese: 何も見てない私の瞳から)	March 23, 2008
After Shin'ichirō listens to Noe talk to herself at the beach, he goes home but is unable to sleep due to her words. The following day is the festival, and despite not getting any sleep, Shin'ichirō does the dance perfectly with all the others. Hiromi tries to tell Noe to leave her and Shin'ichirō alone, though she still comes to watch Shin'ichirō dance on stage. Afterwards, Shin'ichirō blows off Hiromi to go search for Noe so that he can tell her that he finished his picture book. When he finds her at school up in the tree where they first met, Shin'ichirō watches from afar as she jumps off into the snow below.
13	"Your Tears"; Transliteration: "Kimi no Namida o" (Japanese: 君の涙を)	March 30, 2008
The day after the festival, Shin'ichirō goes to Jun to apologize for Noe's broken leg, though Jun says he will not forgive him. Jun later sees Hiromi and breaks it off with her, saying that he never loved her, not even a little bit. Shin'ichirō decides to show his picture book to Noe, but she refuses, so he says he is going to throw it into the sea, which he does by ripping out the pages and making them into paper airplanes. Noe interferes and they manage to recover all but the last page, but Noe looks at the rest of them. Shin'ichirō and Noe part with him telling her that while he is in love with Hiromi, his heart wavers when he looks at Noe. Shin'ichirō goes to see Hiromi at night and tells her that he will always be with her. Several months later in the spring, Noe is finally able to shed tears for the first time in years.

== See also ==
- List of anime based on video games
