= Mai no Mahō to Katei no Hi =

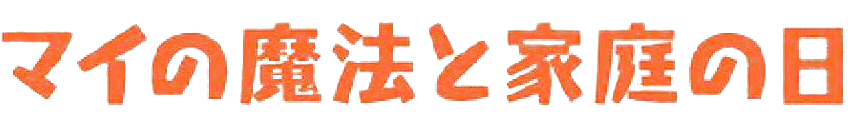
- Screenplay by: Shotaro Suga
- Story by: Moeko Shimizu
- Directed by: Masayuki Yoshihara
- Starring: Sumi Shimamoto; Mami Koyama; Kanako Miyamoto; Daiki Nakamura; Katsuhisa Houki; Yoshitsugu Matsuoka
- Music by: eufonius
- Country of origin: Japan
- Original language: Japanese

Production
- Producer: Kenji Horikawa
- Editor: Masayuki Kurosawa (Bee Train)
- Running time: 30 minutes

Original release
- Release: February 20, 2011

Mai no Mahō to Katei no Hi (マイの魔法と家庭の日, Mai's Magic and Family Day) is a 2011 Japanese anime television special produced by P.A. Works which aired in the Toyama Prefecture of Japan on the local network, KNB, and other networks in February 2011. Toyama Governor Takakazu Ishii revealed the project during a press conference for the 2011 prefectural budget. The series centers on second-grader Mai Tatsumi who use magic to understand her family's feelings. The series was designed to raise public awareness about the importance of family bonds.

Voices included Sumi Shimamoto as the mother, Yuki, and Mami Koyama as Hotaru, the grandmother.
