= Riya (singer) =

- Born: February 18
- Origin: Fukuoka, Japan
- Years active: 2003–present
- Label: Lantis
- Member of: Eufonius
- Website: www.eufonius.net

Riya (born February 18) is a female Japanese singer from Fukuoka, Japan. In her early career, she admired Akino Arai. Riya eventually became the lead singer and lyricist to the J-pop band Eufonius, which debuted in 2003.

== Solo discography ==
=== Singles ===
- "Toki no Mukōgawa", Released March 24, 2005 by Lantis

=== Albums ===
- Sorarado, Released on December 28, 2003
- Sorarado Append, Released on December 28, 2004
- Love Song, Released August 31, 2005 by Key Sounds Label

=== Other songs ===
- "Mawaru Sekai de" (duet with Haruka Shimotsuki; opening theme to PlayStation 2 game Akai Ito)
- "Tabiji no Hate" (duet with Haruka Shimotsuki; ending theme to Akai Ito)
- "Dianoia" (opening theme to PC game Saishū Shiken Kujira)
- "Crescent Moon" (opening theme to Dreamcast & PlayStation 2 game Suigetsu ~mayoigokoro~)
- "Mag Mell" (opening theme to Clannad)
- "-Kage Futatsu-" ("-Two Shadows-")/ "Chiisana Tenohira" (ending theme to Clannad)
- "Hikari no Hō e ~Ashita e no Jumon~ (opening theme to PlayStation 2 game Mabino x Style)
- "Narcissus" (opening theme to Narcissu: Side 2nd)
- "Apocrypha" (opening theme to Shinkyoku Sōkai Polyphonica)
- "Reflectia" (opening theme to True Tears and, in a modified version, as an insert song for Tari Tari)
- "Hiyoku no Hane" (opening theme to Yosuga no Sora)
