= Maquia: When the Promised Flower Blooms =

2018 Japanese animated film by Mari Okada

- Japanese theatrical release poster

Japanese name
- Kanji: さよならの朝に約束の花をかざろう
- Literal meaning: Let's decorate the morning of farewell with the promised flower
Transcriptions
- Revised Hepburn: Sayonara no Asa ni Yakusoku no Hana o Kazarō
- Directed by: Mari Okada
- Written by: Mari Okada
- Produced by: Naoko Endō; Tomomi Kyōtani; Nobuhiro Takenaka; Nobuhiro Kikuchi
- Starring: Manaka Iwami; Miyu Irino
- Cinematography: Satoshi Namiki
- Edited by: Ayumu Takahashi
- Music by: Kenji Kawai
- Production company: P.A. Works
- Distributed by: Showgate
- Release date: February 24, 2018
- Running time: 115 minutes
- Country: Japan
- Language: Japanese
- Box office: $4.3 million

Maquia: When the Promised Flower Blooms (Japanese: さよならの朝に約束の花をかざろう, Hepburn: Sayonara no Asa ni Yakusoku no Hana o Kazarō; lit. 'Let's Decorate the Promised Flowers on the Morning of Goodbye') is a 2018 Japanese animated high fantasy drama film directed and written by Mari Okada and produced by P.A. Works. It features character designs and animation direction by Yuriko Ishii adapted from Akihiko Yoshida's original designs, and music composed by Kenji Kawai. The film is Okada's directorial debut and the first standalone feature-length, theatrically released production of P.A. Works.

Maquia: When the Promised Flower Blooms tells the story of the titular Maquia, a young girl belonged to a special race called the Iorph, mystical beings who can live for hundreds of years. While escaping war, she finds a lone surviving newborn and raises him as her son.

The film premiered in Japan by Showgate on February 24, 2018, and at the Glasgow Film Festival on March 4, 2018. It was released by Madman Entertainment on June 7, 2018. It was released by Anime Limited on June 27, 2018. It was released by Eleven Arts on July 20, 2018. The film's English dub premiered in the United States on September 21, 2018. It was released on Blu-ray Disc and DVD in North America on February 5, 2019. The Blu-ray has both Japanese and English tracks, while the DVD only has an English track.

== Plot ==
The Iorph are a humanoid race that live far removed from the world of humans, spending their days weaving Hibiol; a special cloth which serves as a written chronicle for the passing of time. They stop physically aging at fifteen and can live for hundreds of years. They are legendary to outsiders, who have dubbed them the "Clan of the Separated".

Maquia, a young, orphaned Iorph girl, serves as an assistant to the clan's chief, Racine, who warns her about creating emotional attachments to outsiders, saying that Maquia will know what true loneliness is if she does. Soon afterward, the neighboring kingdom of Mezarte sends armed soldiers on the backs of flying dragons called Renato to the Iorph village. Unable to find the secret to their longevity, the army attacks, killing most of the Iorph and kidnapping Leilia, Maquia's friend. One of the Renato succumbs to the "Red Eye" disease and goes berserk during the attack. It becomes tangled in Hibiol and flees from the village, inadvertently carrying Maquia, who is tangled in the fabric. The Renato later crashes and dies in a forest. Maquia wakes up and meets an alcoholic merchant at an ambushed caravan, where she finds a newborn human boy, held tightly in the arms of his deceased mother. Refusing to let him die, she takes him in as her son. She travels to the village of Helm, where a woman, Mido, takes them in, raising them alongside her two sons, Lang and Deol. Maquia names her adopted son Ariel.

Seven years later, Ariel grows into a child. The Kingdom of Mezarte had once built their strength and reputation on their ownership of the ancient Renato, but the ones have started to succumb to the "Red Eye" disease, leaving them with under ten as they begin to die out. Fearing the inevitable loss of power and influence, the king of Mezarte tries to claim ownership of another ancient and legendary power: the Iorph's longevity, leading him to attempt to introduce Iorph blood into the royal bloodline. Through a message woven into a Hibiol Maquia finds in a shop, she discovers that Leilia has been forced into an arranged marriage with the prince of Mezarte. She travels on a ship with Ariel to try to free Leilia. On the ship, she meets Krim; a male Iorph and Leilia's former boyfriend from their homeland. Krim is also seeking to free Leilia. Once in the capital of Mezarte, the two meet with a number of other Iorph, and unsuccessfully ambush a royal parade. Maquia reunites with Leilia, but learns that Leilia is pregnant with the prince's child. Maquia flees on Leilia's orders and avoids capture with the help of the merchant, revealed to be half-Iorph. Krim, undeterred, resolves to continue trying to free Leilia, and leaves Maquia and Ariel behind.

Six years later, Maquia and Ariel move to the iron-forge city of Dorail, where Maquia works as a restaurant waitress. Ariel becomes a teenage forge worker. He becomes alienated from Maquia by the ever-decreasing difference in their apparent ages. Meanwhile, Leilia, still in the palace, is a prisoner of the royals. She has been cast aside because her daughter, Medmel, has no signs of having Iorph longevity. She has not been able to meet Medmel ever since her birth, leaving her in despair. One day, Ariel and Maquia happen to meet Lang, now a soldier in Mezarte's army. Their meeting pushes Ariel and Maquia farther apart, allowing Ariel to join the army of Mezarte. Moments after he leaves, Maquia is kidnapped by Krim.

Seven years later, Ariel has returned to the capital and married a girl he knew in Helm named Dita, and she is pregnant with their first child. Meanwhile, Krim has gathered the support of the surrounding nations to invade and overthrow Mezarte. He takes a still-captive Maquia with him, trying to reach the palace in the battle. They are separated in a forest outside the capital, and after a brief encounter with Ariel, Maquia goes to the town and finds Dita in labor. She helps deliver the baby, while Ariel continues to fight and is wounded in the battle. Maquia finds Ariel and they share a heartfelt conversation before she offers him an emotional goodbye. Maquia heads to the palace. Elsewhere, after finally finding Leilia in the palace and being rejected in favor of Medmel, Krim tries to commit double suicide, but Krim is ambushed and killed by the chief guard. As the battle ends with Mezarte's defeat, Ariel returns home and meets his newborn daughter, Millia. Maquia takes the last living Renato and flies away with Leilia, who manages to reunite briefly with Medmel before leaving her behind.

Forty years later, Maquia returns to the village of Helm once again with the half-Iorph merchant. There she encounters Ariel's granddaughter and daughter on the way to his home. Finding Ariel as an old man on his deathbed, she holds his hand and shares some parting words during his final moments. Leaving their home, she shoulders the pain of her loss, breaking her promise and crying as she remembers the moments of her life she spent with him. Maquia rejoins the merchant and continues on the road, remarking to herself that despite the profound pain of loss, loving her son brought her happiness.

A post-credit image shows the Iorph village being reinhabited once again by the surviving Iorph and their descendants, along with Maquia and the last Renato.

== Voice cast ==
Characters	Japanese	English	Description
Maquia	Manaka Iwami	Xanthe Huynh	A female surviving Iorph who escapes from the soldiers of Mezarte and enters the outside world. While travelling, she copes her sadness and inspired to be a mother, by adopting and accompanying Ariel.
Ariel	Miyu Irino; Yuki Sakurai (childhood); Taichi Iwakawa (baby)	Eddy Lee; Ryan Shanahan (teen); Barnaby Lafayette (child)	An orphaned survivor in the outside world inspired to be a son, when he was a baby adopted and raised by Maquia. He became Dita's future husband.
Leilia	Ai Kayano	Cherami Leigh	A female surviving Iorph who is ambushed and kidnapped by the soldiers of Mezarte. She has been imprisoned in the kingdom of Mezarte and forced into motherhood for twenty years.
Krim	Yuki Kaji	Kevin T. Collins	A surviving male Iorph obsessed by the mission to save Leilia and overthrow Mezarte.
Lang	Yoshimasa Hosoya; Xu Bin (young)	Michael Schneider; Spencer Rosen (young)	Deol's brother, Mido's first son, and a friend of Maquia and Ariel.
Racine	Miyuki Sawashiro	Lipica Shah	A female elder of the Iorph clan ambushed and killed by the soldiers of Mezarte.
Mido	Rina Satō	Allegra Clark	The mother of Lang and Deol, and a widowed farmer whose husband was killed by the Renato.
Dita	Yoko Hikasa; Yuki Kurimoto (young)	Ryan Bartley; Catie Harvey (young)	A female villager and Ariel's future wife.
Medmel	Misaki Kuno	Brooklyn Nelson; Courtney Chu (young)	The daughter of Price Hazel and Leilia, and the half-Iorph born in Mezarte around the outside world.
Izor	Tomokazu Sugita	Marc Thompson	A knight commander of Mezarte assisting Prince Hazel and the king.
Darel	Shunsuke Sakuya	H.D. Quinn	Mido's business partner and a calm farmer.
Deol	Junnosuke Shishido	Micah Gursoy	Lang's brother and Mido's second son.
Barrou	Hiroaki Hirata	Daniel J. Edwards	An half-Iorph merchant travelling through the outside world.

== Music ==
The film's score was composed and arranged by Kenji Kawai. The film's ending song, "Viator" (ウィアートル), was composed, arranged and performed by Rionos, with lyrics provided by Riya. The soundtrack was released by Bandai Visual on February 24, 2018.

Tracks
No.	Title	Length
1.	"Iorph, the Clan of the Separated (イオルフ、別れの一族)"	2:06
2.	"Wings of Extinction (滅びの羽音)"	4:55
3.	"Encounter with the Separated (別れとの出会い)"	1:36
4.	"Motherly Days (母になる日々)"	4:36
5.	"Parting Emotions (別れの実感)"	5:07
6.	"Unexpected Reunion (予期せぬ再会)"	1:36
7.	"Lurking in the Celebration Parade (祝賀パレードに潜む)"	1:49
8.	"Daily Reality (日々の現実)"	2:18
9.	"Workers' Banquet (労働者の宴)"	1:37
10.	"Loneliness Leading To Perdition (滅びへと向かう孤独)"	2:59
11.	"Mixed Affection (愛情の交錯)"	2:35
12.	"Separation (別離)"	2:30
13.	"Vengeance and Madness (復讐と狂気)"	1:27
14.	"Prelude to Destruction (滅びへの序章)"	1:49
15.	"The Madness of the Clan of the Separated (別れの一族とその狂気)"	1:31
16.	"Life and Life (生命と生命)"	3:41
17.	"Mother and Child (母と子)"	5:30
18.	"Fly to the Sky (大空に飛び立つ)"	3:32
19.	"Grateful and Prepared (感謝と覚悟)"	2:22
20.	"Promised Flowers (約束の花)"	3:18
21.	"Viator (ウィアートル)"	4:47
Total length:		61:41

== Reception ==
=== Box office ===
The film grossed $160,988 in North America in November 2018. It grossed $4.3 million worldwide, including $1.2 million in Japan and $2.5 million in China by March 2019.

=== Critical response ===
The film received 100% rating based on 26 reviews, with an average rating of 7.8/10 on Rotten Tomatoes. It said, "Maquia: When the Promised Flower Blooms anchors its colorfully imaginative fantasy setting in universal — and deeply poignant — real-world themes." Metacritic reports a weighted average score of 72 out of 100 based on eight critics, indicating "generally favorable reviews".

Makoto Shinkai called Maquia: When the Promised Flower Blooms a "fantastic film that can shake up memories within you that you normally forget."

Takehiko Shinjō called it a "heart-warming, wonderful film which teaches that love makes people stronger and nurtures them."

Miranda Sanchez for IGN gave the film an 8.5 out of 10 and wrote that it was "a beautiful story about motherhood, aging, and loss".

=== Accolades ===
List of awards and nominations
Year	Award	Category	Recipient(s)	Result	Ref.
2018	12th Asia Pacific Screen Awards	Best Animated Feature Film	Maquia: When the Promised Flower Blooms	Nominated	
2018	21st Shanghai International Film Festival	Best Animation	Maquia: When the Promised Flower Blooms	Won	
2018	22nd Bucheon International Fantastic Film Festival	BIFAN Children's Jury Award	Maquia: When the Promised Flower Blooms	Won	
2018	51st Sitges Catalonia International Fantastic Film Festival	Fantastic Discovery Category Best Feature Film	Maquia: When the Promised Flower Blooms	Won	
2018	5th Anime Trending Awards	Anime Movie of the Year	Maquia: When the Promised Flower Blooms	Won	
