= List of Munto episodes =

Munto is a Japanese original video animation (OVA) series containing two episodes that were released on March 18, 2003, and April 23, 2005. The episodes were directed by Yoshiji Kigami and were produced by Kyoto Animation. While the first episodes is entitled simply Munto, the second episode is titled Munto 2: Beyond the Walls of Time. The OVAs were licensed by Central Park Media in North America and are distributed by U.S. Manga Corps.

An animated television series remake and sequel to the OVAs entitled Sora o Miageru Shōjo no Hitomi ni Utsuru Sekai, again directed by Kigami and produced by Kyoto Animation, began airing in Japan on January 14, 2009, on Chiba TV. The episodes started airing at later dates on AT-X, KBS Kyoto, Mie TV, Sun TV, Tokyo MX, TV Kanagawa, TV Saitama, and TV Wakayama. Two pieces of theme music are used for the TV series: one opening theme and one ending theme. The TV series' opening theme, entitled "Anemoi" (アネモイ), is performed by Eufonius and its ending theme, entitled "Hikari to Yami to Toki no Hate" (光と闇と時の果て; lit. 'The Edge of Light and Darkness and Time'), is performed by Ceui.

== Munto ==
No.	Title	Original release date
1	"Munto"	March 18, 2003
2	"Munto 2: Beyond the Walls of Time"; Transliteration: "MUNTO Toki no Kabe o Koete" (Japanese: MUNTO 時の壁をこえて)	April 23, 2005

== Sora o Miageru Shōjo no Hitomi ni Utsuru Sekai ==
No.	Title	Original release date
1	"Knowing"; Transliteration: "Shiru Koto" (Japanese: 知ること)	January 14, 2009
Yumemi heads to school with an umbrella propped open to block her view of the sky and meets up with two of her friends, Ichiko and Suzume. A war rages in the magical world overhead and Munto, with the help of Gass who sends him to the Lower world, seeks out Yumemi asking for her help, but gets interrupted before Yumemi can respond. At school, Suzume announces that she will marry her boyfriend, Kazuya. Yumemi and Ichiko become concerned and head out after school to see what kind of a person Kazuya is. The episode ends with the elders of the United Army Headquarters, headed by Gntarl, bringing out a gold combat automaton to give chase after Munto in the Lower world.
2	"Fleeing"; Transliteration: "Nigeru Koto" (Japanese: 逃げること)	January 21, 2009
Yumemi and Ichiko finally meet up with Kazuya by the river side, where the latter states his intentions to "marry" Suzume. His decision, however, causes a bit of unrest and uneasiness for Suzume's friends, Yumemi in particular, because of her thinking that both of them were still too young for such responsibility and commitment. Yumemi also gets a lot of unexpected visits from Munto, asking her for her cooperation in saving the Heavens with her supposed power to control "Akuto", which adds more to her worries and confusion. The following day after meeting with Kazuya, both Ichiko and Yumemi hear about Suzume and Kazuya's plan to cross a river to symbolize their "marriage". While both of them rush out to them, Yumemi gets interrupted once more by Munto, but this time while being pursued and attacked by the gold combat automaton sent after him by Gntarl. Meanwhile, both Suzume and Kazuya begin their venture out to cross the river.
3	"Confronting"; Transliteration: "Tachimukau Koto" (Japanese: 立ち向かうこと)	January 28, 2009
Suzume and Kazuya begin crossing across the river, where they initially come across some resistance from some teachers who gave chase upon them, thinking they were going to commit suicide. Ichiko and Yumemi catch up to them, and cheer the two on as they make for the other riverbank, all while reminiscing about their past with Suzume. Meanwhile, Munto is seen continuing his battle with the gold combat automaton, and it is seen in the Heavens that the Magical Kingdom is down to its last pillar after withstanding most of the attacks on it, despite Gass' attempts to protect it. As soon as Suzume and Kazuya finish their crossing of the river, the Heavens suddenly become visible to everyone else. This spurs Yumemi then to look once more for Munto and offer to help him this time, thinking that she holds her loved ones' futures in her hands with her abilities. She manages to come across a slowly disappearing and badly weakened Munto after his battle with the automaton. Yumemi singlehandedly crosses the space-time continuum upon Munto's instructions, reaching out to him before he completely disappeared, and at the same time restoring the proper flow of Akuto to the Heavens, saving it from destruction.
4	"Yearning"; Transliteration: "Motomeru Koto" (Japanese: 求めること)	February 4, 2009
A year and a half passes by and after a long uneventful stretch, Yumemi once again starts to see pieces of land from the Heavens falling to the lower world where she resides. Up in the Heavens, the Magical Kingdom is once again under siege by the heavenly state of Horguze. After a bit of a struggle, Munto manages to fend off the attackers by targeting and destroying their command ship. They are joined by some of the Ender forces, led by Lieca, who offers to come to their aid. The attacks by Horguze and some other heavenly states/countries were the result of the sudden influx of Akuto to the Heavens because of Yumemi's actions a year and a half ago, which drove most of them mad. It is for this reason that Gntarl seeks once more to acquire Yumemi and use her abilities to regulate the Akuto flow. Gass tries to stop his plans, but he is in a considerably more weakened state than before because of the stripping of his Outsider status following his assistance of Munto to get to the lower world. He loses an arm while trying to wipe out most of Gntarl's forces in his weakened state. He acknowledges to himself that he would need more help to stop Gntarl's plans after escaping. Gass finally appears once more in the Magical Kingdom, helping Munto fend off another attack, then sending him once more to the lower world to help protect Yumemi from being abducted by Gntarl.
5	"Confusing"; Transliteration: "Mayō Koto" (Japanese: 迷うこと)	February 11, 2009
Ichiko wants to take Yumemi to the amusement park to try to take her mind off of the floating islands only she can see. When Yumemi, Ichiko, and Suzume are helping out at Takeshi's shrine, Yumemi finds a large rock near the shrine which reacts to her touch, enabling her to get closer to Munto for an instant, but is then repelled. Yumemi continues to have visions of Munto's past, and Ichiko worries about her well being. The day they go to the amusement park, the day starts off well but later when they are eating lunch Yumemi starts acting strange and suddenly something falls from the sky causing a huge explosion.
6	"Believing"; Transliteration: "Shinjiru Koto" (Japanese: 信じること)	February 18, 2009
Ichiko tries to stop Yumemi from leaving her side after she tells Ichiko that she must go to where Munto is to help him. Suzume, however, believes in Yumemi and persuades Ichiko to let her go. Yumemi leaves to find Munto, who realizes the destruction was caused by Gntarl's attempt to abduct Yumemi via raising a portion of her city. Once Yumemi finds Munto, she pleads to him to grant her the chance to help him, but Munto does not want her to get involved any more. Ichiko, Suzume, and some others from school find Yumemi on a Ferris wheel car dangling over a cliff, and Ichiko tries to keep her to stay by asking her to come back, but Yumemi has already made up her mind. Yumemi convinces Munto that he needs her help, and Yumemi leaps from the car into Munto's arms, effectively bridging a gap between the two worlds. The resulting explosion disables Gntarl's ship, and Munto takes Yumemi to the heavens in the midst of a battle. Yumemi is protected while Munto goes to fight.
7	"Forgiving"; Transliteration: "Yurusu Koto" (Japanese: 許すこと)	February 25, 2009
Yumemi's protectors are attacked, causing her to fall and unexpectedly release a tremendous amount of power to quell the fighting. Afterwards, Yumemi meets with Munto and Ryuely, and learns more about the Akuto from Toche while eating strange fruit produced from Akuto. Gntarl does not want to give up trying to capture Yumemi and decides to do it alone, against the others. Munto shows Yumemi the distant past and how the Heavens came into being. Munto wants to keep the Heavens from falling, so he needs Yumemi's help, and he tells her that even though he cannot erase the sins of the past, he wants to make a better future.
8	"Unyielding"; Transliteration: "Akiramenai Koto" (Japanese: 諦めないこと)	March 4, 2009
Yumemi is taken to Ryuely to prepare her to support Munto, and she sees Ichiko and Suzume trying to support her. They fall off the Ferris wheel and Yumemi is able to complete the ceremony by going to them and taking them back to the Heavens. Ichiko does not want Yumemi to go off by herself again, and is overjoyed when Yumemi invites her and Suzume to come along with her. Finally, the three of them jump off into the sky towards the light where Munto is. One of the beings made from Akuto from the Magic Kingdom goes after them.
9	"Loving"; Transliteration: "Aisuru Koto" (Japanese: 愛すること)	March 11, 2009
The Akuto automaton catches the falling Yumemi and her friends and fly them towards the pillar of light to assist Munto. Yumemi laughs the experience off, demonstrating the effects of the ritual Ryuely led her through. Gntarl is on the scene watching Munto energize the pillar of light as he computes his next move. Gntarl captures Ichiko and Suzume, and demands capitulation of Yumemi who decides to sacrifice herself. Much to everyone's surprise, Yumemi turns the tables on Gntarl with a harsh lecture on his misconduct. In spite of the turn of events, Yumemi is upbeat with the perspective that nothing has really been lost as long as the selfless spirit is protected. Yumemi is able to defeat Gntarl and regain her friends, though Munto cannot stop the pillar of light from fading. Afterwards, Yumemi and her friends offer their power to Munto, and the two worlds are finally stabilized and merged.
