= The Laid-Off Cheat-Granting Mage Enjoys a Second Lease on Life =

Japanese web novel series and manga

- First light novel volume cover, featuring (from left to right) Nina, Rein Garland, and Lily Flambert

追放されたチート付与魔術師は気ままなセカンドライフを謳歌する。俺は武器だけじゃなく、あらゆるものに『強化ポイント』を付与できるし、俺の意思でいつでも効果を解除できるけど、残った人たち大丈夫？ (Tsuihō Sareta Chīto Fuyo Majutsushi wa Kimama na Sekando Raifu o Ōka Suru. Ore wa Buki Dake ja Naku, Arayuru Mono ni "Kyōka Pointo" o Fuyo Dekiru shi, Ore no Ishi de Itsu demo Kōka o Kaijo Dekiru kedo, Nokotta Hitotachi Daijōbu?)
- Genre: Fantasy
- Novel series
- Written by: Asa Rokushima
- Published by: Shōsetsuka ni Narō
- Original run: January 16, 2021 – present
- Light novel
- Written by: Asa Rokushima
- Illustrated by: Kisui
- Published by: Kodansha
- Imprint: Kodansha Ranobe Books
- Original run: January 5, 2022 – October 7, 2022
- Volumes: 2
- Manga
- Written by: Asa Rokushima
- Illustrated by: Gyomuyomochi
- Published by: Kodansha
- English publisher: Kodansha (digital)
- Imprint: Monthly Shōnen Magazine Comics
- Magazine: Shōnen Magazine R; (October 20, 2021 – January 20, 2023); Monthly Magazine Base; (February 20, 2023 – present)
- Original run: October 20, 2021 – present
- Volumes: 22
- Anime television series
- Directed by: Shū Honma
- Written by: Yoko Yonaiyama
- Music by: Arisa Okehazama
- Studio: P.A. Works
- Licensed by: Crunchyroll (streaming); EA/SEA: Medialink
- Original network: TXN (TV Tokyo), AT-X
- Original run: October 7, 2026 – present
- Episodes: 6
- icon

The Laid-Off Cheat-Granting Mage Enjoys a Second Lease on Life, (Note: Japanese: 追放されたチート付与魔術師は気ままなセカンドライフを謳歌する。俺は武器だけじゃなく、あらゆるものに『強化ポイント』を付与できるし、俺の意思でいつでも効果を解除できるけど、残った人たち大丈夫？, Hepburn: Tsuihō Sareta Chīto Fuyo Majutsushi wa Kimama na Sekando Raifu o Ōka Suru. Ore wa Buki Dake ja Naku, Arayuru Mono ni "Kyōka Pointo" o Fuyo Dekiru shi, Ore no Ishi de Itsu demo Kōka o Kaijo Dekiru kedo, Nokotta Hitotachi Daijōbu?) also known as Chii Fuyo (チー付与, Chī Fuyo) for short, is a Japanese web novel series written by Asa Rokushima. It began serialization on the online publication platform Shōsetsuka ni Narō in January 2021. Kodansha later published it as a light novel featuring illustrations by Kisui, releasing two volumes between January and October 2022. A manga adaptation by Gyomuyomochi based on Rokushima's original light novel began serialization in Kodansha's Shōnen Magazine R in October 2021, before being transferred to Monthly Magazine Base website.

The manga widely departs from the novel, including manga-original characters and a different storyline and worldbuilding. Rokushima has described the two versions as "990%(99割)" different. An anime television series produced by P.A. Works adapts the manga version and premiered in October 2026. The manga had over 1.5 million copies in circulation as of August 2026.

== Plot ==
The web novel and light novels and the manga share the same opening premise, but immediately developed into almost completely different stories. Rokushima has described the contents of the novel and manga versions as almost entirely different, and the anime adaptation follows the manga version.

=== Novels ===
Rein Garland is an enchanter for the adventurer guild Beast's Fangs. Believing his services are no longer needed after he finishes strengthening all of their equipment, the guild laid him off. Feeling betrayed by the people he regarded as his companions, Rein recollects the enchantments on their gear and recovers his accumulated bonus points. When he applies these bonus points to his own low-grade equipment, they become extraordinarily powerful, allowing him to embark on a successful solo career.

Rein's growing reputation draws the attention of Lily Flambert, an S-rank knight from the guild Emperor's Shields, and Martina Jeera, a noblewoman from the Uralis Kingdom who is a candidate to become the next Hero. After obtaining a legendary sword, Rein is also named a Hero candidate. He travels to the Uralis Kingdom to help reinforce the seal on the Radiant Dragon, an ancient calamity. However, the dragon awakens prematurely, pulling Rein and his allies into a wider war involving wielders of supernatural artifacts known as Heavenly Relics.

=== Manga ===
The manga adaptation opens with the same premise as the novel, in which Rein is dismissed from Beast's Fangs and withdraws the bonus points he had placed on the guild's equipment, but the story that follows is largely original. It is set in a world where magic coexists with modern technology such as cars, firearms and recorded media, and where the two interfere with one another: using technological goods weakens a person's magic, while strong magic damages machinery.

After that, Rein joins the Blue Crystals, a small guild run by Elsie Zra, and is paired with Lily Flambert, an S-rank adventurer who has not drawn her sword since her party was killed at the Radiant Dragon Ruins two years earlier. Margaret Ells, whose elder sister died on that expedition, blames Lily for it. Rein returns to the ruins with them, where Lily and Margaret settle the matter between them and the Radiant Dragon is killed. Mirabelle, an assassin hired to kill Rein and Lily by Cornelius, fights alongside them there and afterwards gives up assassination to join the guild.

Rein's activities increasingly draw Blue Crystals into conflicts outside conventional adventuring. Among those he encounters is Mirabelle, an assassin raised by the Mother of Assassins, who eventually leaves her former life behind and joins Blue Crystals. The guild later becomes embroiled in a conflict involving the THUG (半グレ), a group of former adventurers and other social outcasts involved in organized crime. The group is led by Half, a former member of Beast's Fangs who had previously operated under the identity Glenda. Rather than functioning simply as hired criminals, the THUG form a tightly knit community centered on Half, and their conflict with Blue Crystals culminates in a confrontation between Half and Elsie.

Following the conflict with the THUG, the story broadens into a crisis involving the revival of the dragon race and political turmoil in the Kingdom of Zeruge. The return of dragons, which had once driven humanity to the brink of extinction, draws Blue Crystals and the surviving factions from the preceding conflicts into a larger struggle. The ensuing conflict develops into a struggle over the throne of Zeruge alongside renewed hostilities between humans and dragons, bringing together characters and organizations introduced throughout the manga.

== Setting and terminology ==
Enchantment magic (強化付与魔術, kyōka fuyo majutsu)
Magic used by an enchanter (強化付与魔術師, kyōka fuyo majutsushi) to place power, measured in "bonus points", into weapons, armour and other objects in order to strengthen them. The amount an object can normally receive depends on its quality and durability. Rein is unusual in that he can withdraw abnormally large amount of points he has already granted and reuse them elsewhere, as well as apply them to a wider range of objects than conventional equipment.

Adventurers
Guild-affiliated people who undertake monster suppression, exploration and other dangerous work. In the manga, adventurer guilds occupy an important position in the Kingdom of Zeluge and operate with a degree of independence alongside the kingdom's civil and military authorities. Many experienced adventurers possess an individual form of magic that determines their fighting style.

Magic and technology
In the manga, magic coexists with modern technology, including cars, firearms and recorded media. Reliance on technological goods reduces a person's magic, while strong magic can interfere with machinery, making the two difficult to use together. The effect varies between individuals and can lessen if a person stops using technological conveniences. Rein attracts attention after demonstrating that his enchantment magic can also be applied to technological objects.
Heaven's Relics (天の遺産, ten no isan)
Exceptionally powerful supernatural abilities that exist outside ordinary magic. They appear in both versions, but their users and treatment differ substantially. In the novel, Rein's enchantment is identified as the "Granting" Relic, while other holders possess abilities including Destruction and Movement. The manga later reintroduces the same concept for unusually powerful abilities possessed by people known as holders (保持者, horudā), although the abilities and characters associated with them are different from their novel counterparts.
Kingdom of Zeluge (ゼルージュ王国, Zerūju Ōkoku)
The principal country in which the manga is set. Its society relies heavily on adventurers for exploration and monster suppression. The royal family becomes increasingly important when the king's declining health develops into a succession dispute between the first prince Hearkeen and the second prince Dura.
Dragon race
Dragons appear in both versions but are developed differently. In the novel, the Radiant Dragon King is an ancient calamity served by powerful dragon followers, including the Seven Dragon Knights. The manga expands the dragons into an ancient intelligent race with its own society and internal disagreements. Their earlier wars with humanity are said to have brought humans close to extinction.

== Characters ==
The novel and the manga adaptation share most of their principal cast but differ substantially in plot and characterization; the author has stated that the two versions are almost entirely different from one another. Several of the groups described below, including the THUGs and the Zelruge succession conflict, are original to the manga.

=== Blue Crystal ===
The Blue Crystal (青の水晶, Ao no Suishō) is the adventurer guild Rein joins after leaving Beast's Fangs. It appears in both versions, although its membership and importance differ. In the manga, Elsie runs it as a refuge for adventurers who have suffered failures or setbacks.

Rein Garland (レイン・ガーランド, Rein Gārando)
Voiced by: Daiki Yamashita (Japanese); Justin Briner (English)
The protagonist, an enchanter who can place bonus points into weapons, armour and other objects and withdraw them at will. He begins both versions as a member of Beast's Fangs and takes back the points he had placed on the guild's equipment after being dismissed.
In the novel, Rein quickly discovers that his ability far exceeds that of an ordinary enchanter, rises through the adventurer ranks and becomes a candidate for the title of Hero. In the manga he initially has little experience fighting as an adventurer despite the strength of his magic, and learns practical adventuring from Lily and the other members of the Blue Crystal. He is considerably more eccentric than his novel counterpart, often making jokes or behaving strangely even in dangerous situations, although he is consistently willing to put himself at risk to help other people.
Lily Flambert (リリィ・フラムベル, Rirī Furamuberu)
Voiced by: Lynn (Japanese); Hollis Beck (English)
An S-rank adventurer. In the novel she is a prominent member of the Emperor's Shields who seeks Rein out after hearing about his enchantment magic and becomes one of his regular companions. She is polite and reserved despite having become the youngest adventurer to reach S rank.
In the manga, Lily belongs to the Blue Crystal and is the youngest adventurer to have reached S rank. She has been unable to use her sword since losing the other members of her party were killed during an expedition to the Radiant Dragon Ruins two years earlier, and initially carries considerable guilt over being the only survivor. After confronting the circumstances surrounding the expedition with Margaret and Rein, she resumes fighting. Her personal magic uses flame to burn magic itself, allowing her to interfere with an opponent's magical defences as well as attack directly. Her manga counterpart is also more temperamental and outspoken than the novel version.
Margaret Ells (マーガレット・エルス, Māgaretto Erusu)
Voiced by: Yoshino Aoyama
A B-rank adventurer of the Emperor's Shields whose characterization differs considerably between the two versions. In the novel, she is a cheerful and competitive younger adventurers, admires Lily and regards Rein as both a rival and a dependable companion.
In the manga, her elder sister was a member of Lily's party and died during the expedition to the Radiant Dragon Ruins, causing Margaret to blame Lily for her death when she is introduced. She is sarcastic and often hides what she is feeling, but later becomes one of Rein and Lily's regular companions. She keeps her sister's dog, Acorn (どんぐり, Donguri). During the later conflict with the dragon race, Margaret becomes closely involved in the revival of the Radiant Dragon King.
Mirabelle (ミラベル, Miraberu)
Voiced by: Miyu Tomita
In the novel, she is sent to kill Rein but is defeated and readily gives up information about her employer. Unable to return to her assassin guild afterwards, she becomes an adventurer and joins the Blue Crystal. She is largely carefree, self-interested and used as a comic character..
In the manga, Mirabelle was raised from childhood by the Mother of Assassins in an abusive environment in which killing was treated as ordinary and she was taught to place little value on human life. She becomes a highly skilled assassin while still young. After being hired by Cornelius to kill Rein and Lily, she gradually breaks with her upbringing, helps them during the Radiant Dragon incident and eventually leaves assassination to join the Blue Crystal. She later struggles with guilt over the people she has killed and retires Adventuring.
Elsie Zra (エルシー・ゾラ, Erushī Zora)
Voiced by: Megumi Han (Japanese); Kyleigh Zimmerer (English)
The guild master of the Blue Crystal in both versions. In the novel, her role is primarily administrative: she manages Rein's progress through the adventurer ranks, explains the guild system to him and encourages his advancement.
The manga greatly expands her role and backstory. Elsie was formerly an S-rank adventurer but retired while still young after seeing a veteran adventurer she respected fall into poverty after being forced to retire. She established the Blue Crystal as a place for adventurers who had failed or had nowhere else to go, although the guild's generous policies leave it heavily in debt. She places the safety of its members above its finances and is willing to use deception or politically risky schemes to protect them.
Despite a long period away from active adventuring and a reduction in her magic caused by her use of technological entertainment, Elsie remains a powerful fighter. Her magic manipulates electricity, normally channelled through a three-pronged weapon, and she combines it with considerable combat experience.
Nina (ニーナ, Nīna)
Voiced by: Konomi Kohara (Japanese); Lacey Deline (English)
A receptionist for the Blue Crystal who invites Rein to join after his dismissal from Beast's Fangs. Her role is larger in the novel, where she regularly spends time with Rein outside the guild and eventually confesses that she is in love with him. The manga removes most of this romantic subplot; Nina instead serves mainly as an administrator and a pragmatic foil to Rein and Elsie's behaviour.
Las (ラス, Rasu)
A young swordsman of the Blue Crystal who looks up to Rein. In the novel, he is a fourteen-year-old C-rank adventurer regarded as a promising swordsman.
The manga reworks him almost completely while retaining his admiration for Rein. He appears later as a large, inexperienced and timid young man who joins the Blue Crystal after its growing reputation attracts new applicants.
Bernard Zra (バーナード・ゾラ, Bānādo Zora)
A major member of the Blue Crystal in the novel and its highest-ranked adventurer when Rein first joins. A large, good-natured middle-aged mage, he accompanies Rein on his first quest and willingly gives up his position as the guild's leading adventurer after seeing Rein's ability. He continues to act as one of Rein's senior companions in the novel but has no appearance in the manga.

=== Other recurring characters ===
Martina Jeera (マルチナ・ジーラ, Maruchina Jīra)
In the novel, Martina is a noblewoman from the Uralis Kingdom and one of the leading candidates to become the next Hero. She possesses a legendary sword and is responsible for helping reinforce the seal on the Radiant Dragon King, bringing Rein and Lily into the conflict.
The manga keeps her noble background but otherwise rewrites her considerably. Rather than a Hero candidate, she is an Crown adventurer (王選冒険者, ōsen bōkensha) from a family known for producing prominent adventurers and had previously spent time with the Blue Crystal. Unlike her accomplished relatives, Martina is only C-rank and has a strong inferiority complex about her lack of ability. During a Cyclops-suppression assignment she falsely presents herself as an A-rank adventurer because of the expectations placed on her, but ultimately helps Rein's group through her observation and analysis rather than combat ability.
Cyril (シリル, Shiriru)
A novel-only character who appears alongside Dita during the conflict surrounding the Radiant Dragon King. She is a holder of the Movement Heaven's Relic, which allows her to move or transport herself and others through space, and continues to appear in later novel storylines involving the Relics.
Acorn (どんぐり, Donguri)
Voiced by: Takumi Yamazaki
Barrius (バリオス, Bariosu)
Voiced by: Taiten Kusunoki (Japanese); Rick Robertson (English)
The guild master who dismisses Rein. In the novel, Barrius believes the guild no longer needs an enchanter after its equipment has already been strengthened. He responds to the guild's decline by blaming Rein and escalating a series of unsuccessful attempts at retaliation, eventually losing both his position and control of the guild.
The manga portrays him as less malicious but considerably more impulsive and indecisive. His decision to dismiss Rein is made largely because doing so has become fashionable, and he focuses on trying to rebuild Beast's Fangs rather than pursuing personal revenge. After Rein refuses his request to return, Barrius accepts responsibility for the guild's failure, dissolves it and begins a new life operating a food truck. He is later gets killed by former members who have joined the THUG.
Glenda (グレンダ, Gurenda)
Voiced by: Megumi Toyoguchi
A senior member of Beast's Fangs whose role is much larger in the manga. In the novel, Glenda is a middle-aged swordswoman and one of three deputy guild masters of Beast's Fangs, alongside Cornelius and Gail. She is more willing than Barrius to recognize the severity of the guild's decline and eventually attempts to persuade Rein to return before leaving the guild herself.
In the Manga, she is cold, forceful and highly respected by the adventurers she commands. She attempts to capture Rein and force him to restore the guild's equipment, but is killed by Mirabelle during Cornelius's separate assassination attempt. Half, whom Glenda had taken in as a child and who regarded her as a parent, subsequently becomes one of the central figures among the former Beast's Fangs members.
Cornelius (コーネリアス, Kōneriasu)
Voiced by: Makoto Furukawa
In the novel, Cornelius is one of Beast's Fangs' three deputy guild masters and generally acts together with Glenda and Gail during the guild's decline. The three eventually abandon Beast's Fangs and have difficulty finding comparable positions elsewhere.
In the manga, he is portrayed as violent, vain, hires Mirabelle to assassinate Rein and Lily without Barrius's approval. His later attempt to claim credit for Glenda's death makes him a target of Half and the other adventurers who were loyal to her.

Gail (ゲイル, Geiru)
An elderly cleric and the third deputy guild master of Beast's Fangs in the novel. He generally appears alongside Glenda and Cornelius as part of its senior leadership, including when they attempt to warn Rein about Barrius and later seek new employment after leaving the guild. Unlike Glenda and Cornelius, Gail does not appear in the manga.

=== THUG ===
THUG (半グレ, Hangure) are a manga-original criminal group made up largely of former members of Beast's Fangs. The Japanese name puns on hangure, a term for loosely organized criminals, and on Half's habit of saying that half (han) of him is made of Glenda (gure); the official English release renders it as an acronym, "The Half of Us is Glenda". Although involved in organized crime, the central members form a family-like community around Half. Most of its leading members are former adventurers with individual magical abilities, and their battles turn on the conditions and limits of those abilities. Their conflict with the Blue Crystal forms one of the manga's major story arcs.

Half (半分, Hanbun)
Voiced by: Nobuhiko Okamoto
The founder and leader of the THUGS and a former member of Beast's Fangs whose real name is unknown. He spent much of his childhood alone until Glenda recognized his abilities and brought him into the guild, and he came to regard her as a parental figure. His repeated statement that "half of me is made of Glenda" is associated with both his name and the identity of the group. After her death he leaves the guild with the other adventurers loyal to him and builds the THUG.
Half possesses an unusually large amount of magic and can manipulate air with fine control, using it for attack, defence, detection and movement. He is also an experienced hand-to-hand fighter and a capable strategist.
Endy (エンディ, Endi)
One of Half's closest companions and among the THUG. Hot-tempered but attached to the others, he fires magic projectiles that track their target by heat.
Take (タケ, Take)
A reckless member of the THUGS who enjoys dangerous situations. His ability swaps the area around him with an area at a chosen location.
Koji (コージ, Kōji)
A laid-back but manipulative member of the group. His magic places one person at a time under hypnosis and can produce false sensations affecting multiple senses.
Sota (ソウタ, Sōta)
The youngest of Half's close companions. His magic rapidly accelerates the growth of plants at the cost of ageing his own body, the more so the larger the growth.
Minoru (ミノル, Minoru)
One of Half's close companions. His ability creates an enclosed space in which the participants must settle a confrontation under special conditions that he interprets as divine judgement.
Koge (コゲ, Koge)
A calm former adventurer who handles intelligence. He can draw information out of another person's head, though repeated use exhausts him and can leave the target dead.

=== Assassins ===
Mother of Assassins (暗殺の母, Ansatsu no Haha)
Voiced by: Rie Shibata
A manga-original veteran assassin from a family that has practiced assassination for generations, and Mirabelle's foster mother. She raised Mirabelle and numerous other children as assassins, subjecting them to violent training and treating affection as conditional on their usefulness as killers. Her relationship with Mirabelle is consequently portrayed as that of a controlling or toxic parent.

=== Kingdom of Zeluge ===
The Kingdom of Zeluge (ゼルージュ王国, Zerūju Ōkoku) is the manga's main setting and the country in which the Blue Crystals operates. Its prosperity rests on adventurers, whom the monarchy grants considerable privileges in return for exploration, monster suppression and the development of new territory, though the Royal Crown Army can mobilize soldiers and guilds alike against anyone the crown treats as a threat.

King of Zeluge (ゼルージュ国王, Zerūju Kokuō)
The father of Hearkeen, Dura and the other royal children. An aging but forceful monarch who values the authority and continued prosperity of the kingdom. His declining health creates uncertainty over the succession. Although he retains affection for Hearkeen, he ultimately doubts his suitability to succeed him.
Erica (エリカ, Erika)
A Manga original character, a captain in the Royal Crown Army who is assigned to investigate and monitor the Blue Crystal after Elsie makes a false report to the kingdom. She subsequently remains with the group as both Rein's guard and an observer.
Dita (ディータ, Dīta)
A character with substantially different versions in the novel and manga. In the novel, Dita is a member of a distant warrior clan who appears with Cyril and assists the Radiant Dragon King. She possesses the Destruction Heaven's Relic, while Cyril possesses Movement.
In the manga, Dita is an exceptionally powerful adventurer of Zeluge known simply as a holder (保持者, horudā) and is personally loyal to the king. Her appearance closely resembles the novel character, but her personality and ability are different. Her Heaven's Relic produces "waves", which she can generate from her body to tear apart the ground, redirect physical force and attack or defend on a scale far beyond ordinary magic. She initially restricts herself to using the ability through her hands in order to make battles less one-sided.
Hearkeen (ハーキーン, Hākīn)
Manga original character. The first prince of Zeluge. Unlike several of his siblings, who spend much of their time travelling or fighting monsters, Hearkeen has remained close to the court and regards himself as his father's natural political successor. He is harsh, authoritarian and convinced that a ruler should be willing to use unpleasant means for the sake of his subjects.
After the succession begins to turn against him, his determination to become what he considers a good king leads him to increasingly extreme methods. He mobilizes adventurers and criminals who would ordinarily be outside the royal power and eventually seeks support from forces hostile to humanity, even as he continues to justify his actions as an attempt to avoid placing the direct burden of war on ordinary subjects.
His magic allows him to place a mark on a target and issue commands that the target is compelled to obey. It can affect people, objects and even the dead, making the ability one of the strongest associated with the royal family.
Dura (ドゥーラ, Dūra)
The second prince of Zeluge and the king's preferred successor. Although a woman, she is styled the second prince rather than the first princess. Dura has closer ties to adventurers than her brother and commands a personal adventurer unit known as the Dura Squad. Rein and his companions become associated with her faction after being drawn into the succession dispute. She is cheerful and approachable but extremely self-sacrificing, regarding almost all of her time and even her life as belonging to the kingdom.
Her personal ability allows her to view significant memories from another person's past, although she cannot freely choose which memory she will see.

=== Dragon race ===
The dragon race is an ancient people of intelligent dragons who take a form resembling a human. Their earlier wars are said to have brought humanity close to extinction, so their return is treated as a global threat to the entire continent. Later volumes give particular attention to their reliance on humans as prey and to their disagreements over it.

Radiant Dragon King (光竜王, Kōryūō), Dig Fa Rose (ディグ・ファ・ローゼ, Digu Fa Rōze)
In the novel, Dig Fa Rose is an ancient dragon described as a calamity comparable to gods and demon kings. He is said to have destroyed most of the world before being sealed by an ancient Hero and is served by a group of powerful followers that includes the Seven Dragon Knights. His attempted awakening becomes one of the novel's first major large-scale conflicts.
The manga reuses the Radiant Dragon King as the ruler revered by the surviving dragon race, but greatly expands the dragons' history and motives. Their effort to revive him becomes connected to the Zeluge succession conflict, and he is eventually restored using Margaret's body as a vessel. Unlike the largely destructive antagonist of the novel's early storyline, the manga version is willing to communicate with Rein's group and shows interest in coexistence between dragons and humans.
Garges (ガージェス, Gājesu)
A dragon associated with the Radiant Dragon King's followers in both versions. In the novel he is an opponent encountered during the struggle surrounding the king's seal and has a comparatively limited role.
The manga greatly expands him into one of the senior dragons and a principal organizer of the effort to revive the Radiant Dragon King. He considers renewed conflict between humans and dragons difficult to avoid and accepts the dragons' predation on humans, but is comparatively restrained and insists that the lives they take should not be treated casually.
Redguf (レドグフ, Redogufu)
In the novel, Redguf is one of the Seven Dragon Knights who serve the Radiant Dragon King. He appears as a large dragon-headed humanoid, can transform into a full dragon and is presented primarily as a powerful enemy for Lily, Martina and the other adventurers.
The manga retains Redguf as one of the Radiant Dragon King's followers but gives him a substantially larger role and a more human-looking form. He is aggressive and openly regards humans as prey, hunting adventurers while helping gather power for the dragons. Despite this, he is loyal to the Radiant Dragon King and respectful toward senior dragons such as Garges. Continued contact with humans later causes him to question aspects of his race's treatment of them.

== Production ==
=== Manga ===
According to Fujikawa, the series' editor(now editorial chief) of Shōnen Magazine R, Kodansha's Monthly Shōnen Magazine editorial department began expanding into isekai fantasy after successes with the genre in other Kodansha magazines, and The Laid-Off Cheat-Granting Mage was the first series launched when the department began that initiative.

Fujikawa credits the manga's wild direction to the combination of Rokushima's willingness to allow changes and Gyomuyomochi's talent. He described the work as an classic fantasy at its core, under all the jokes and curveballs, it carefully depicts the growth and changes of characters such as Lily and Margaret. Kodansha's Japanese manga site credits Gyomuyomochi for the manga, Rokushima for the original work, and kisui for the original character designs.

=== Anime ===
Director Shū Honma said that he approached Kodansha back in early 2023 to adapt the manga and that the project began right after that.

== Media ==
=== Light novels ===
The series is written by Asa Rokushima, who originally began posting the series on the online publication platform Shōsetsuka ni Narō on January 16, 2021; the series later also began being posted to Kadokawa's online publication platform Kakuyomu on July 6, 2023. Kodansha later published the series as a light novel featuring illustrations by Kisui; two volumes were released under their Kodansha Ranobe Books imprint between January 5 and October 7, 2022.

No.	Release date	ISBN
1	January 5, 2022	978-4-06-526049-4
2	October 7, 2022	978-4-06-529704-9

=== Manga ===
A manga adaptation by Gyomuyomochi, based on Rokushima's light novel, began serialization in Kodansha's Shōnen Magazine R on October 20, 2021, and was later transferred to Monthly Magazine Base on February 20, 2023; the series is also being published on their online services Comic Days and Magazine Pocket. The first tankōbon volume was released on February 9, 2022; twenty-two volumes have been released as of October 8, 2026.

Kodansha began releasing the manga in English on its K Manga service on March 19, 2026.

No.	Release date	ISBN
1	February 9, 2022	978-4-06-526921-3
2	June 9, 2022	978-4-06-528424-7
3	October 7, 2022	978-4-06-529554-0
4	February 9, 2023	978-4-06-530673-4
5	June 8, 2023	978-4-06-531991-8
6	October 6, 2023	978-4-06-533459-1
7	January 9, 2024	978-4-06-534438-5
8	March 8, 2024	978-4-06-535082-9
9	April 9, 2024	978-4-06-535079-9
10	June 7, 2024	978-4-06-535951-8
11	September 9, 2024	978-4-06-537277-7
12	November 8, 2024	978-4-06-537804-5
13	January 8, 2025	978-4-06-537934-9
14	April 9, 2025	978-4-06-539101-3
15	July 9, 2025	978-4-06-540093-7
16	August 7, 2025	978-4-06-540157-6
17	October 9, 2025	978-4-06-541117-9
18	November 7, 2025	978-4-06-541434-7
19	February 9, 2026	978-4-06-542312-7
20	May 8, 2026	978-4-06-543435-2
21	August 7, 2026	978-4-06-544458-0
22	October 8, 2026	978-4-06-544897-7

=== Anime ===
An anime television series adaptation of the manga was announced on February 6, 2026. The series will be produced by P.A. Works and directed by Shū Honma, with Yoko Yonaiyama handling series composition and Yuito Kiyosawa designing the characters, and Arisa Okehazama composing the music. It premiered on October 7, 2026, on TV Tokyo and its affiliates. The opening theme song is "Ember Torch" (エンバートーチ), performed by Sumika. Crunchyroll will stream the series. Medialink licensed the series in East (excluding China and Japan) and Southeast Asia for streaming on Ani-One Asia's YouTube channel.

==== Episodes ====
No.	Title	Directed by (Note: Production staff information is taken from the ending credits of each episode.)	Written by	Storyboard by	Original release date
1	"Everyone knows what it's like when nothing goes right, but what do I do when that happens? Why, it's obvious! I run and scream my head off!" Transliteration: "Nani mo Umaku Ikanai Tokitte Dare Datte Aru to Omou nda kedo, Sonna Toki Ore wa Dou Suru ka tte? Kimatteru sa, Tada Hitasura ni Sakebi Nagara Hashiru nda yo. Oaaaaa!" (Japanese: 何も上手くいかない時って誰だってあると思うんだけどそんな時俺はどうするかって？決まってるさただひたすらに叫びながら走るんだよおああああッ！)	Unknown	Unknown	TBA	October 7, 2026
To save money, the nobles running the Beast's Fang adventurer guild decide to arbitrarily fire Rein, their Enchanter who has never been adventuring himself. Unbeknownst to them, Rein can reclaim the bonus points he imbued into their equipment over the years. Upset none of his "friends" stood up for him, he retracts all 13,033 points from the adventurer's equipment, placing 10,000 into his cheap copper sword and 3,033 into his clothes. Traveling to Zeluge, Rein meets guild secretary Nina, who watches in shock as a thug breaks his own hand punching Rein's magically fortified shirt. Nina invites him to register at the Blue Crystals, a run-down guild managed by retired adventurer Elsie. When 100 thugs attack, Rein blasts them away, and part of the neighborhood, using his enhanced sword. Elsie promises to train him, but charges him 1,000 gold to repair the neighbourhood, landing him in debt. Despite warnings, Rein tackles a dragon-slaying quest alongside Lily Flambert, history's youngest S-Rank adventurer, who is fascinated after her sword fails to pierce his clothing. Rein wonders why a famous adventurer belongs to an impoverished guild, but as they approach the dragon, an increasingly distressed Lily confesses she hasn't completed a quest in two years.
2	"The enhanced clothes I was wearing were destroyed by a devastating blow, and a traumatized girl in casual clothes hit me with all her might."	Unknown	Unknown	TBA	October 14, 2026
Lily confesses to hiding with the Blue Crystals after a traumatizing near-death mission. When the dragon attacks, Rein protects her with his clothes that withstand the dragon fire, then slays the dragon with his sword, though both items are destroyed, leaving him naked. Realizing Lily intended to die to shield the Crystal's reputation, Rein questions her; she admits it but resolves to overcome her trauma. They form a party, while an observing Elsie feels relieved. After collecting 700 points from the dragon, they encounter Cornelius and his party from Beast Fang. Cornelius murders two captured adventurers to demonstrate his weakening equipment and demands Rein re-enchant everything. Lily lies that Rein lost his enchanting ability. When Cornelius demands Lily as compensation, Rein defends her using enchanted pebbles that cause massive explosive damage, driving the Fangs away. Furious, Beast Fang's guild master orders Rein found and punished to protect their reputation. Recognizing that Rein needs a sturdier weapon to handle his powerful enchantments, Lily and Rein set out, soon encountering Margaret, an unsettling figure from Lily's past.
3	"When I went to apologize with a friend who was a shut-in for two years, we were unexpectedly served apple bunnies, so I think she's been forgiven."	TBA	TBA	TBA	October 21, 2026
Margaret reveals Beasts Fang has a bounty on them. She also hints that Lily only survived her last mission by abandoning her party to die, which included Margaret's sister. They return to the Blue Crystals and learn the bounty has been cancelled. Since the Beasts Fangs equipment all failed and Cornelius was defeated by Rein, their reputation is ruined, and many members have already quit to join other guilds. Rein asks about Lily's past and is told Lily and her party tried to tackle a dungeon containing a treasure guarded by the Radiant Dragon. When everyone died except Lily, a young Margaret blamed Lily. The treasure was the Dragon Emperor's sword Lefaid, the weapon Lily mentioned might be able to withstand Rein's enchantments. Lily explains that she does not actually know what happened in-between being knocked unconscious by the dragon and waking up in hospital, so she does not actually know how she survived. Determined to face her past, Lily and Rein go to Margaret's home. Margaret is surprised by Lily's plan to return to the dungeon, but asks to go with them to confirm that Lily got her sister killed, then kill her as revenge. Rein purchases new armour but is brutally told by Margaret he was ripped off by the shady merchant as it looks bizarre and offers zero protection, concluding Rein is an idiot.
4	"There's something I've learned from ending up naked twice... When you're naked, you get bitten twice."	TBA	TBA	TBA	October 28, 2026
Rein insists on enchanting Margaret’s armour, but she angrily refuses, unwilling to rely on anyone after her sister died relying on Lily. That night, she finds Rein naked outside her house; having stripped after her dog attacked him, so his armour's enchantments wouldn't kill the dog. Margaret agrees to have her armour enchanted, but seeing the armour reach +300, she realizes Lily wearing similar armour would render her unkillable, so she tricks the naive Rein into enchanting her sword too. Cornelius and Beast Fang vice-guild master Glenda visit Margaret, planning to kidnap Rein to re-enchant their equipment. Cornelius's companion Mirabelle suddenly murders Glenda, when she doubts her skills while Cornelius reveals that he only cares about revenge on Rein for humiliating him. Margaret aligns with them, insisting on killing Lily herself. At the Radiant Dragon Ruins, Margaret rushes ahead, assuming Lily’s trauma and amnesia are lies. Cornered by powerful goblins, she is saved when Lily tackles her, allowing Rein to slay them with his enchanted sword. Observing Lily's genuine terror during combat, Margaret begins questioning her assumptions while realizing Rein is smarter than he appears. Lily recognizes a doorway despite her memory loss, and Rein discovers a gold coin they let him keep as a souvenir of his first quest. Rein also finds a note reading "Lily Flambert killed us." Attempting to hide it beneath his unenchanted clothes, they are ripped when Lily and Margaret demand on seeing the note, leaving him naked again.
5	"A girl who wants you to know she really can cook despite the lack of cooking scenes draws and wreathes her sword in flames."	TBA	TBA	TBA	November 4, 2026
Seeing the note, Margaret attacks Lily. Nearby, Cornelius boasts to Mirabelle about faking the note, but Rein captures him and finds extra notes in his pocket. Realizing she was manipulated, Margaret confesses to collaborating with Cornelious and Mirabelle. Cornelius tries to stab her, but his dagger snaps against her enchanted armour. With Cornelius a hostage, Mirabelle disappears. With no way to pursue her, the group stops to eat. Eating Lily's soup, Margaret realizes it tastes just like her sister's cooking. Mirabelle openly returns, warning Cornelius they must now cooperate with Rein or die. Everyone is confused, until the two-headed Radiant Dragon suddenly appears. Lily finally remembers trying to sacrifice herself so her former party would survive, but the dragon killed them anyway, leaving her too traumatized to draw her sword. Overcoming her fear, her hands finally stop shaking. Rein enchants her blade, enabling her and Margaret to wound the dragon. As the dragon praises their effort, Mirabelle awakens and reveals her abusive childhood; Rein turns his back mid-battle to comfort her, baffling the dragon. Finally, it notices Rein’s copper sword is enchanted to +10,000, powerful enough to cut it in half. Terrified, the dragon's two heads frantically argue over how to survive.
6	"You're persistent, girl... You haven't changed at all, and you're powerless to do anything again... But still, I am Lily Flambert!"	TBA	TBA	TBA	November 11, 2026
A flashback reveals the Dragon deliberately cursed Lily with her amnesia and phobia to ensure lifelong suffering. In the present, the dragon flees so Rein cannot reach them. However, Lily stabs the right head in the spine, forcing them to the ground in excruciating pain. When Rein arrives, exhaustion leaves him vulnerable to a tail-bash. Gloating, the dragon fails to realise they let Rein get close enough not for a stab, but a throw. Rein's airborne dagger impales the dragon's heart, killing them despite a final, pathetic attempt by the left head to kill Lily. Meanwhile, Mirabelle still believes her only worth is as an assassin and moves to kill Rein. Margaret blocks her strike as Mirabelle despairs over her new emotions that prevent her from killing, fearing abandonment by her abusive mother. Trapped under rubble, Cornelius demands Mirabelle kill Rein and rescue him, threatening to expose her worthlessness to her mother. Margaret counters that Cornelius merely views her as a weapon, whereas Rein believes in her potential. When goblins appear, Mirabelle rescues Cornelius, slays the goblins, and decides to confront her mother directly. Rein invites her to visit once she breaks ties with her mother, before retrieving Lefaid and heading home.
7	"I've never been to that bakery before, so I'll take this opportunity to stuff my face with melon bread and walk a dog, wahoo."	TBA	TBA	TBA	November 18, 2026
Mirabelle returns to her mother's assassin guild. Rein invites Margaret to join the Blue Crystals, though she flees in embarrassment. Meanwhile, Barius, guild master of Beast's Fang, decides to cancel the contract on Rein and ask him back, but his disgusted members reject the idea. At her current guild, the Emperor's Shields, Margaret is warned to avoid the debt-ridden Blue Crystals. Barius later begs Rein to return, admitting his vital role in their past success. Rein refuses, asserting his loyalty to the Blue Crystals. Seeing Rein’s genuine friendship with Lily and Margaret, Barius accepts this and resolves to disband Beast's Fang. At the Blue Crystals, Elsie dismisses Margaret's concerns about their debt. After Rein and Lily thank Elsie for improving their lives, she shocks them by claiming she is bored as a guild master and closes the guild. Elsewhere, Margaret confesses to Barius her fear of not fitting in with the Crystals, and he encourages her to try. When the Spirit's Bow guild attempts to recruit Rein and Lily, Lily deduces Elsie orchestrated it. Confronting Elsie, she confesses their massive debt, explaining she feigned cruelty to drive them away for their own good. Years ago, finding her crippled, homeless S-rank mentor inspired her to create a haven to support troubled adventurers. Now bankrupt, she owes 500 million gold to the Emperor's Shields and must pay or join their guild in three months. Lily vows to earn the money before the deadline.

== Reception ==
The manga had over 1.5 million copies in circulation as of August 2026. It was nominated in the web manga category of the 2023 Next Manga Award.

Writing for Da Vinci in 2024, Kyo Furubayashi praised the manga adaptation's comedy, noting its differences to the original web novel and how Rein's personality boosted the series' humor. Furubayashi also noted that, despite sharing similar characters, the manga and web novel had almost completely different stories, which helped the manga stand out and become a topic on social media. In a 2025 KAI-YOU column, Yuuki Honda wrote that, while many similar "banishment" stories exists, his manga's gags an humors are surprisingly sharp. He also pointed out how it can go from a comedic tone into serious organizational and tactical battles.
