= Brooklyn Nelson =

American actress

- Born: 2003 or 2004 (age 22–23); Huntington, West Virginia, U.S.
- Occupation: Actress
- Years active: 2015–present

Brooklyn Nelson (born 2003 or 2004) is an American actress. Born in Huntington, West Virginia, Nelson began acting as a child in a local theater production of The Little Mermaid Jr. at age eight. She made her professional debut on Broadway as a small girl swing (Note: In musical theater, a swing is a performer who understudies multiple roles.) in Matilda the Musical in 2015. In 2018, she returned to Broadway, originating the role of young Elsa in the stage adaptation of Disney's Frozen along with her counterpart Ayla Schwartz; she had initially played the role in the 2017 Denver pre-Broadway tryout, garnering critical praise. Nelson also lent her voice to the English dub of the characters of Nazuna Oikawa and Medmel in Fireworks (2017) and Maquia: When the Promised Flower Blooms (2018), respectively.

== Early life ==
Nelson was born in Huntington, West Virginia, to Tara and Todd Nelson. She has a younger sister, Lacey. Nelson became passionate about theater at the age of eight, when she landed a role in The Little Mermaid Jr. at Huntington's First Stage Theater. She later appeared in several local productions by First Stage, Curtain Up Players, and the Huntington Regional Theater. Nelson expressed interest in becoming a Broadway actress after seeing a performance of Matilda the Musical. She attended Village of Barboursville Elementary School and Barboursville Middle School. She remained enrolled in the latter while rehearsing and performing Frozen; her schoolwork was done online.

== Career ==
After Nelson expressed interest in performing on Broadway, her mother searched for open casting calls on the internet. In April 2015, she auditioned for Matilda the Musical; she was cast after multiple callbacks. She rehearsed for eight to nine hours a day for six weeks to familiarize herself with the show's choreography and music. Her 16-month run in Matilda the Musical began in September 2015 at age 11, where she was a small girl swing, shifting between the roles of Lavender and Amanda Thripp. She eventually moved fully onto the role of Amanda.

In February 2017, Nelson attended an audition for Disney's Frozen, a Broadway adaptation of the 2013 film of the same name. After three callbacks, she was cast as young Elsa. For several weeks, Nelson attended rehearsals for approximately eight hours a day, six days a week, during which she was tutored and did her schoolwork. An older sister herself, Nelson took inspiration from her real-life dynamics with her younger sister and family. She first played the role in the Denver tryout in 2017, sharing it with Ayla Schwartz. Reception towards the show was mixed, though the cast garnered praise. Critics commended Nelson's performance, with Variety stating: "The grown actresses [playing Anna and Elsa] are matched pound for wee pound by the youngsters playing Anna and Elsa as girls. ... Nelson captures a big sister's kind attentiveness and, later, her guilt at accidentally harming [Anna]." In March 2018, she and Schwartz originated the role on Broadway. She appeared in four of the production's eight weekly performances. She left the cast at the end of April 2018. Nelson also sang on the play's Broadway cast recording, which was released in May.

In 2017, Nelson voiced Nazuna Oikawa in the English dub of anime film Fireworks, which received mixed reviews. Her second voice role came in 2018's Maquia: When the Promised Flower Blooms, another anime film, in which she provided the English dub for the character of Medmel. The same year, Nelson appeared as the titular character in Megan's Christmas Miracle, starring opposite Dean Cain.

== Credits ==
=== Theater ===
| Year | Production | Role | Venue | Notes | Ref. |
|---|---|---|---|---|---|
| 2015–2016 | Matilda the Musical | Small girl swing (Note: Nelson shifted between the roles of Amanda Thripp and Lavender while she was a small girl swing.) / Amanda Thripp | Shubert Theatre | | |
| 2017 | Frozen | Young Elsa | Buell Theatre | Pre-Broadway tryout | |
| 2018 | Frozen | Young Elsa | St. James Theatre | | |

=== Film ===
| Year | Title | Role | Notes | Ref. |
|---|---|---|---|---|
| 2017 | Fireworks | Nazuna Oikawa | English dub | |
| 2018 | Maquia: When the Promised Flower Blooms | Medmel | English dub | |
| 2018 | Megan's Christmas Miracle | Megan | | |
