= Tari Tari =

Japanese anime television series

- Cover of the Sixth Blu-ray volume of Tari Tari as published by Pony Canyon
- Genre: Musical film; Slice of life
- Manga
- Written by: Evergreen (original work); Tōru Naomura (construction)
- Illustrated by: Tomiyaki Kagisora
- Published by: Square Enix
- Magazine: Gangan Joker
- Original run: July 2012 – September 2012
- Volumes: 2
- Anime television series
- Directed by: Masakazu Hashimoto
- Produced by: Yōsuke Wada; Tsuyoshi Oda; Yasushi Ōshima; Kenji Horikawa; Takema Okamura; Hiroshi Kawamura; Takeshi Ishigaki
- Written by: Masakazu Hashimoto
- Music by: Shirō Hamaguchi
- Studio: P.A. Works
- Licensed by: Sentai Filmworks
- Original network: TVK; KBS; ITC; Tokyo MX; Chiba TV; Sun TV; TV Aichi; NOTTV one
- English network: Anime Network
- Original run: July 1, 2012 – September 23, 2012
- Episodes: 13

Tari Tari is a 2012 Japanese anime television series produced by P.A. Works, written and directed by Masakazu Hashimoto. It aired in Japan between July 1 and September 23, 2012, on TV Kanagawa, and was also simulcast by Crunchyroll. The anime is licensed in North America by Sentai Filmworks. A manga adaptation illustrated by Tomiyaki Kagisora was serialized in Square Enix' Gangan Joker in 2012.

== Plot ==
Set in Fujisawa and Kamakura, Kanagawa, Tari Tari focuses on five Japanese high school students who are too young to be called adults, but no longer think of themselves as children.

Wakana Sakai once took music lessons, but withdrew from it after losing her mother. Konatsu Miyamoto is a positive-thinking girl who loves singing and spends time after school at the vocal music club. Sawa Okita is a high-spirited archery club member who dreams of becoming a horse rider. Taichi Tanaka is a chronically late badminton team member who lives with his college student sister. Wien just transferred into Wakana's class after twelve years abroad in Austria. Music brings the group together into an ensemble during their last summer in high school.

== Characters ==
=== Main characters ===
Wakana Sakai (坂井 和奏, Sakai Wakana)
Voiced by: Ayahi Takagaki
Wakana is the main protagonist who lives with her father and attends the same after school class as Wien. She aims to attend music school after graduation and follow in her mother's footsteps. Although Wakana is good at singing, she refuses to do so to the point of turning down Konatsu's attempt to recruit her into her new choir club. Her mother died when she was in her last year of middle school and hid her sickness from her to allow Wakana to focus on her entrance exams and not worry about her, but she started living in regret for being unable bid farewell to her daughter properly.
When her father shows Wakana her mother's notes regarding a song she was composing to her, she finally moves forward and join the club as a regular member while dedicating herself to finish her mother's song.
Konatsu Miyamoto (宮本 来夏, Miyamoto Konatsu)
Voiced by: Asami Seto
Konatsu is a short, earnest girl who loves to sing and dance. She was previously affiliated with the choir club until she had a falling out with their supervisor, who did not allow her to sing. After the incident of stage fright the previous year's recital, Konatsu began training herself by performing in the public park. She decides to create her own club to be able to keep singing, but when it falls too short on members, she combines it with Taichi's badminton club to form the "Choir and sometimes Badminton Club". After graduation, Konatsu goes to college and joins a club there.
Sawa Okita (沖田 紗羽, Okita Sawa)
Voiced by: Saori Hayami
Sawa is Konatsu's best friend. Apart from being an equestrian with her horse, Sabure, Sawa is also a member of the archery club, and is the first member invited by Konatsu to join the latter's new music club. She wishes to become a professional jockey in the future, which often leads to disagreements with her father, who believes her to be simply playing around.
To make matters worse, Sawa learns that there is an upper weight limit for students who wish to join the equestrian school, thus cannot move on with her dream, even after her father agrees to support her. She drops out of school before graduation in order to attend an equestrian school abroad. Nonetheless, despite leaving Japan and studying abroad prior to the official graduation ceremony, Sawa is still allowed to graduate from Shirahamazaka High School.
Taichi Tanaka (田中 大智, Tanaka Taichi)
Voiced by: Nobunaga Shimazaki
The only member of the badminton club, Taichi is a serious yet insensitive person in matters regarding girls. He hopes to become a pro badminton player someday. Taichi is good at singing but terrible at drawing, having once been encouraged by Konatsu to draw again before she saw Taichi's drawing ability. He develops a crush on Sawa.
Atsuhiro "Wien" Maeda (前田 敦博/ウィーン, Maeda Atsuhiro/Wīn)
Voiced by: Natsuki Hanae
Wien, German for Vienna, is a returnee who transfers into Shirahamazaka High School after spending twelve years in Austria. Due to his time away, he is very unfamiliar with Japanese customs, and is seen always consulting books about it, with often humorous results. He is in the same after-school class as Wakana and is obsessed with a super sentai show called "Net Hero Ganbaraigers". He often writes letters to a young and sickly Austrian boy named Jan, who he left his Red Ganbaraiger toy with. However, in the anime, the letters show the name "Yang" instead of "Jan". After graduation, he returns to Austria.

=== Others ===
Keisuke Sakai (坂井 圭介, Sakai Keisuke)
Voiced by: Kenji Hamada
Keisuke is Wakana's father.
Mahiru Sakai (坂井 まひる, Sakai Mahiru)
Voiced by: Sayaka Ōhara
Mahiru is Wakana's mother who died just before Wakana entered high school. She was part of the original choir club alongside Naoko and Shiho. Mahiru wrote the Condor Queen's best hit, "Amigo! Amigo!", which is also Konatsu's favorite song.
Naoko Takakura (高倉 直子, Takakura Naoko)
Voiced by: Atsuko Tanaka
Responsible for Shirahamazaka High's vocal club, who is put in charge of Konatsu's choir club after its adviser, the principal, is hospitalized following a bicycle accident. She is often harsh towards Konatsu, seeing music as something that should not be treated like a game. She was Mahiru's friend in high school and has not been able to get over her death.
Tomoko Takahashi (高橋 智子, Takahashi Tomoko)
Voiced by: Akiko Kimura
Tomoko is the homeroom teacher of Wakana and the other's class who is on maternity hiatus after giving birth to a baby girl.
Makoto Miyamoto (宮本 誠, Miyamoto Makoto)
Voiced by: Yoshitsugu Matsuoka
Makoto is Konatsu's younger brother who is often blackmailed by Konatsu into helping out with her club. He is a member of the student council.
Shiho Okita (沖田 志保, Okita Shiho)
Voiced by: Mamiko Noto
Shiho is Sawa's mother who enjoys surfing. Like Sawa, she has a bad habit of patting girls on the butt for encouragement. She was Mahiru and Naoko's underclassman in high school.
Shōichi Okita (沖田 正一, Okita Shōichi)
Voiced by: Hiroyuki Kinoshita
Shōichi is Sawa's father who owns the temple near the school where he lives with his family.
Tayoru Ikezaki (池崎 頼, Ikezaki Tayoru)
Voiced by: Katsuhisa Hoki
Tayoru is the principal of Shirahamazaka High and adviser of Konatsu's club.
Haruka Tanaka (田中 晴香, Tanaka Haruka)
Voiced by: Ayako Kawasumi
Haruka is Taichi's older sister who takes care of him. She is a college student.

== Media ==
=== Manga ===
A manga adaptation illustrated by Tomiyaki Kagisora was serialized in Square Enix's Gangan Joker magazine between the June 2012 and November 2012 issues. The first tankōbon volume was released on July 21, 2012. The second and last was December 22, 2012.

=== Anime ===
The 13-episode anime television series is an original creation by Evergreen, produced by P.A. Works, written, and directed by Masakazu Hashimoto, aired in Japan between July 1 and September 23, 2012, on TV Kanagawa, and was also simulcast on Crunchyroll. Sentai Filmworks have licensed the series in North America.

==== Episode list ====
No.	Title	Original release date
1	"Running and Inviting" "Tobidashitari, Sasottari" (飛び出したり 誘ったり)	July 1, 2012
Tomoko Takahashi, a teacher of Shirahamazaka High, is given flowers by her students as she is heading on maternity leave. A boy named Atsuhiro "Wien" Maeda transfers into the class and is guided around the school by badminton player Taichi Tanaka. Meanwhile, a girl named Konatsu Miyamoto quits the choir club after becoming tired of being unable sing and aspires to create a new choir club, of which she needs five members. After managing to convince her best friend, Sawa Okita, to join and forcing her brother to apply as well, Konatsu tries to convince her other friend Wakana Sakai to join, but does not want to sing for personal reasons. As Konatsu goes into town to practice her singing, her voice brings Wakana, Sawa, Taichi and Wien together to the same point.
2	"Gathering and Struggling" "Asettari Agaitari" (焦ったり あがいたり)	July 8, 2012
Sawa brings Wakana and Konatsu to her house, showing Wakana what happened to Konatsu during last year's recital and getting her sign up for their new club in name. Putting their heads together, they eventually gather enough members to present to the principal, Tayoru Ikezaki, who approves it when he sees Wakana is involved and becomes its adviser. Afterwards, Konatsu gets Wakana to help her decide what kind of song they should practice, eventually settling on a song she used to hear her mother sing to her. However, the vice-principal, Naoko Takakura, initially objects to the song for unknown reasons. When Tayoru goes missing when the club needs to go to a joint rehearsal, Konatsu sends Wakana ahead of her while she waits for him. With Tayoru out due to a bicycle accident, Konatsu and Wakana get Tomoko to accompany them and arrive at the theater, but the rest of the club is stuck in traffic. Not wanting to be deterred, Konatsu and Sawa go out on their own, with Wakana backing them up on piano, and manage to pull through. Afterwards, Naoko is put in charge of advising the club while Tayoru recovers.
3	"Swinging and Meeting" "Futtari, Deattari" (振ったり 出会ったり)	July 15, 2012
Once Wakana is approached by a strange foreigner on her way to school, Konatsu once again finds herself short on members as many of them suddenly quit, with Naoko threatening to dissolve the choir club, along with Taichi's badminton club, unless they can find sufficient members. Taichi manages to recruit Wien and takes him to his apartment, where he meets his sister. The next day, Taichi challenges Konatsu to a 2v3 badminton match to obtain each others' members for their club, which inevitably results in the choir club's victory. As a compromise, Konatsu decides to make the club a joint choir and badminton club. When they talk to Tayoru for his approval once again, he mentions a previous choir club which Wakana's mother was in. Although Naoko stands against the club, Taichi and Wakana help stand against her and Tayoru approves it. Upon hearing of a World Music Festival being held in the village, Konatsu decides to enter the contest. Moreover, Wakana is approached by the strange foreigner again.
4	"Getting Angry and Dancing" "Okottari, Odottari" (怒ったり 踊ったり)	July 22, 2012
As Konatsu meets the Condor Queens, which was the band that got her into music, Wien spots Wakana being chased after by the foreigner, who turns out to be the third member of Condor Queens and an acquaintance of Wakana's late mother, Mahiru. Meanwhile, Sawa starts to become annoyed with Konatsu as she appears to want to spend more time with the Condor Queens than practice for the choir club, threatening to quit if she doesn't take things seriously. Wanting to make amends, Konatsu searches for a stage to perform on, which is thankfully registered by Wakana, eventually makes up with Sawa. On the day of the music festival, while the others perform on their modest stage, the Condor Queens give Wakana a letter Mahiru gave them when she was born.
5	"Throwing Away and Holding On" "Sutetari, Suterarenakattari" (捨てたり 捨てられなかったり)	July 29, 2012
When the group shows their support to Taichi as he participates in a badminton tournament, Wakana appears to be occupied by the letter she received. The next day, Wakana runs into Sawa's mother, Shiho, who shows her an old photo of Mahiru in high school with Naoko. Remembering how she had often argued with Mahiru over music before her death due to focusing on her exams, Wakana asks her father, who will go on a short business trip, to get rid of the piano in her room. After Wakana returns home with the piano gone and realizing she is all alone, she recalls the contents of the letter. Wakana expresses Mahiru's desire to write songs with her and starts to regret her decision.
6	"Laughing and Remembering" "Warattari, Omottari" (笑ったり 想ったり)	August 5, 2012
As Wakana comes down with a cold, Konatsu decides to visit her, reminding Wakana of her promise with Mahiru to write a song together. Later, Wakana receives a tape from Shiho containing a recording of when Mahiru was in the choir club before Sawa takes her horseback riding. The next day, Wakana helps Taichi and Atsuhiro with their vocal training before visiting Tomoko and her new baby. Later that day, Wakana learns from her father why Mahiru kept her illness a secret from her, because she want the song they wrote together to be a sad one. When Wakana laments how she allegedly threw away her mother's feelings, her father gives Wakana some sheet music Mahiru wrote before she died so that she can finish it herself, admitting he never sold the piano. After Wakana listens to the tape the next day, she rekindles her own love of singing and joins the rest of the club in a song.
7	"Spinning in Circles and Losing Sight" "Karamawattari, Miushinattari" (空回ったり 見失ったり)	August 12, 2012
As the club tries to decide what to do for the school culture festival, Konatsu is taunted by her former club members. Konatsu soon learns that they have to be approved by Nakao to get on the main stage for the festival. Meanwhile, Sawa is at odds with her father, who sees her ambition of becoming a professional jockey as simply playing around. For some unknown reasons, Sawa starts going a diet and begins skipping a lot of meals, causing Konatsu and Wakana to worry about her. After the girls attend a musical together, Wakana looks to learn composition in order to finish the song Mahiru was writing while also considering her own career. At the end, Sawa is left fatigued from her forced diet and ends up falling off her horse during the archery practice.
8	"Worrying and Racing Ahead" "Ki ni Shitari, Omoikkiri Kakenuketari" (気にしたり 思いっきり駆け抜けたり)	August 19, 2012
Upon being checked by the hospital, Sawa is told by her father to quit horseback archery. Sawa later reveals to Shiho that she was skipping meals as she was attempting to apply for a riding school, but was rejected due to her weight and height. With the vocal group hoarding the practice rooms, the choir club goes to Wien's house, where a harsh Sawa explains her troubles when Wakana suggests she takes a step back. The next day, as Naoko tries to get Konatsu to withdraw her application for use of the stage, Wakana explains what she learned by being able to sing with others, which reminds Naoko of Mahiru. Naoko decides to have the choir club participate in a committee meeting to prove their development. Encouraged by her friends, Sawa rushes on horseback to join her friends' sides at the committee meeting.
9	"Going White and Going Red" "Shiroku Nattari, Akaku Nattari" (白くなったり 赤くなったり)	August 26, 2012
As Konatsu reveals the club will perform a musical drama at the school festival, Wien seems preoccupied by something. Meanwhile, Shiho suggests putting on a superhero show at the shopping district and gets Konatsu and the others to play the part of the superheroes, sparking Wien's interest in particular. When Wakana asks Shiho about how Mahiru went about writing her songs, she suggests asking Naoko, as she previously co-wrote a song with her. After the others notice Wien taking the superhero show too seriously, he reveals all of the letters he sent to a young boy in Austria named Jan were sent back to him. Moreover, Naoko is worried about some supposed changes planned by Tayoru's superiors.
10	"Budding and Burning" "Moetari, Moetari" (萌えたり 燃えたり)	September 2, 2012
Despite some initial setbacks, the group – as Nishinohashi Hero Shoutenger – eventually makes the superhero show to become popular. The next day, Naoko calls up Konatsu and the others about their job, but they also won argument as she has given them permission. Afterwards, Wakana asks Naoko about how Mahiru wrote her songs, to which she replies that she needs to enjoy it while also thinking of her own memories with Mahiru. As the group continues doing the shows, Konatsu's bag is stolen by a thief on a bicycle, prompting Wien to chase after him. With the support of his friends, Wien catches the thief successfully and they make the headlines together.
11	"Filling up and Coming up Short" "Michitari, Kaketari" (満ちたり 欠けたり)	September 9, 2012
As the choir club works hard on its musical, Taichi – who is creating background props – tries to recruit a decent painter, finding one who will agree on the condition he takes some photos of Sawa. When Konatsu, tries to get help from the vocal group, she hears from Naoko that the school festival has been cancelled because the school is closed down to make way for new buildings. Just after the group looks to be disbanded, Wakana reveals she has finished writing her song, deciding they should have their own festival so they can sing it together.
12	"Piling Up and Ringing Out" "Kasanetari, Hibītari" (重ねたり 響いたり)	September 16, 2012
After Taichi manages to get the photo of Sawa for the painter, he spots the props Wien made being taken away by the garbage men. As the others visit the garbage dump to recover them, Konatsu pleads with the student council to resume the school festival, only for her request to be rejected. The next day, when Wakana visits Mahiru's grave, she runs into Naoko and shows her the song she and Mahiru wrote together. After Wien works on props, Taichi seeks help to make some costumes while Sawa pleads to the neighborhood association in bringing an audience and Konatsu gets some help from the vocal group. Meanwhile, the chairman plans to oppose anything that cancels the construction.
13	"Growing Sunny, Crying and Sometimes Singing" "Haretari Naitari, Ato wa Tokidoki Utattari" (晴れたり 泣いたり あとは時々歌ったり)	September 23, 2012
As the group and their families prepare for the festival, they discover the school gates are closed and the gym has been locked up. The chairman confronts them, but Tayoru decides to stand up to him and allow the festival to be held, with Naoko also offering her support by enlisting the help of the vocal group to help perform Wakana's song. The festival gets on the way and the gang perform their musical in front of many guests. After the festival, Wien finally receives a postcard from Jan, while Sawa goes abroad to attend an equestrian school much to Taichi's dismay. Later, Wakana and Naoko get together to reminisce about Mahiru, asking each other to teach her more about music. At the end, everyone graduates and start moving towards their futures.

=== Novel ===
A novel adaptation was announced on July 12, 2018, titled Tari Tari: Mebaitari, Terashitari, Yappari Tokidoki Utattari (Tari Tari〜芽吹いたり 照らしたり やっぱり時々歌ったり〜; lit. 'Tari Tari: Budding, Shining, and Sometimes Singing'). It is set 10 years after the events of the anime series.
