= P.A. Works =

Japanese animation studio

P.A. Works, Inc.

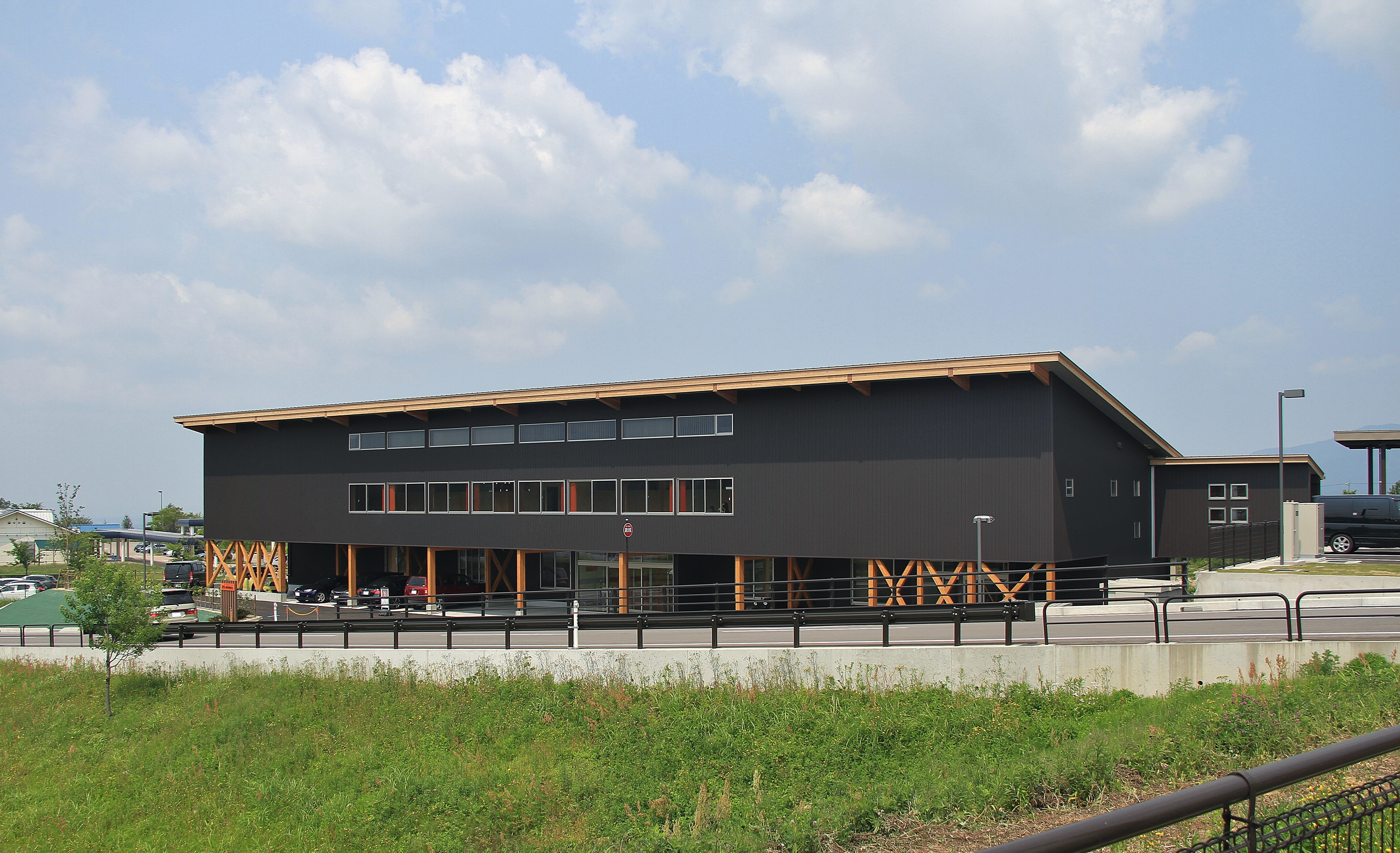
- Headquarters in Tatenoharahigashi, Nanto
- Native name: 株式会社ピーエーワークス
- Romanized name: Kabushiki-gaisha Pī Ē Wākusu
- Formerly: P.A. Works Corporation (2000–2002)
- Type: Kabushiki gaisha
- Industry: Japanese animation
- Founded: November 10, 2000; 25 years ago
- Founder: Kenji Horikawa
- Headquarters: Tatenoharahigashi, Nanto, Toyama, Japan
- Key people: Kenji Horikawa (founder and president); Nobuhiro Kikuchi (representative director)
- Number of employees: 98 (as of April 2017)
- Website: www.pa-works.jp/en/

P.A. Works, Inc. (Japanese: 株式会社ピーエーワークス, Hepburn: Kabushiki-gaisha Pī Ē Wākusu; short for Progressive Animation Works) is a Japanese animation studio founded on November 10, 2000, in Nanto, Toyama. The company's founder and president Kenji Horikawa once worked for Tatsunoko Production, Production I.G, and Bee Train Production, before forming P.A. Works Corporation. The studio changed its name to P.A. Works in 2002. The main office is located in Toyama Prefecture, where drawings and digital photography take place, and production and direction in the studio. The company is also involved with video games, as well as collaborating in the past with Production I.G and Bee Train for anime. In January 2008, P.A. Works produced True Tears, their first anime series as the main animation studio involved in the production process. On April 20, 2018, P.A. Works announced a new e-book label named P.A. Books, with the first release being a novel adaptation of their first anime, True Tears.

== Filmography ==
=== Television series ===
Title	Director(s)	First run start date	First run end date	Eps	Note(s)
True Tears	Junji Nishimura	January 6, 2008	March 30, 2008	13	Loose adaptation of La'cryma's visual novel True Tears.
Canaan	Masahiro Andō	July 4, 2009	September 26, 2009	13	Sequel to a scenario in visual novel 428: Shibuya Scramble conceptualized by Type-Moon.
Angel Beats!	Seiji Kishi	April 3, 2010	June 26, 2010	13	A collaboration project with Key, Aniplex, and Dengeki G's Magazine. Original work. Story originally conceived by Jun Maeda.
Hanasaku Iroha	Masahiro Andō	April 3, 2011	September 25, 2011	26	Original work. Story originally conceived by Mari Okada.
Another	Tsutomu Mizushima	January 9, 2012	March 27, 2012	12	Based on the novel by Yukito Ayatsuji.
Tari Tari	Masakazu Hashimoto	July 1, 2012	September 23, 2012	13	Original work. Story originally conceived by Evergreen.
Red Data Girl	Toshiya Shinohara	March 16, 2013	June 1, 2013	12	Based on the novel by Noriko Ogiwara.
Koitabi: True Tours Nanto	Junji Nishimura	April 28, 2013	April 28, 2013	6	Original work. Story originally conceived by Mari Okada.
The Eccentric Family	Masayuki Yoshihara	July 7, 2013	September 29, 2013	13	Based on the novel by Tomihiko Morimi.
Nagi-Asu: A Lull in the Sea	Toshiya Shinohara	October 3, 2013	April 3, 2014	26	A collaboration project with Buriki and Dengeki Daioh. Original work. Story originally conceived by Mari Okada.
Glasslip	Junji Nishimura	July 3, 2014	September 25, 2014	13	Original work.
Shirobako	Tsutomu Mizushima	October 9, 2014	March 26, 2015	24	Original work.
Charlotte	Yoshiyuki Asai	July 4, 2015	September 26, 2015	13	A second collaboration project with Key, Aniplex, and Dengeki G's Magazine. Original work. Story originally conceived by Jun Maeda.
Haruchika	Masakazu Hashimoto	January 7, 2016	March 24, 2016	12	Based on the novel by Sei Hatsuno.
Kuromukuro	Tensai Okamura	April 7, 2016	September 29, 2016	26	Studio's 15th anniversary project. Original work.
Sakura Quest	Sōichi Masui	April 5, 2017	September 20, 2017	25	Original work.
The Eccentric Family 2	Masayuki Yoshihara	April 9, 2017	June 25, 2017	12	Based on the novel by Tomihiko Morimi and sequel to The Eccentric Family.
Umamusume: Pretty Derby	Kei Oikawa	April 2, 2018	June 18, 2018	13	Based on the smartphone game by Cygames.
Sirius the Jaeger	Masahiro Andō	July 12, 2018	September 27, 2018	12	Original work.
Iroduku: The World in Colors	Toshiya Shinohara	October 6, 2018	December 29, 2018	13	Original work.
Fairy Gone	Kenichi Suzuki	April 7, 2019	December 22, 2019	24	Original work.
A3!	Masayuki Sakoi (Note: Credited as Series Director (シリーズディレクター, Shirīzu Direkutā) for Seasons Spring & Summer, and Director (監督, Kantoku) for Seasons Autumn & Winter.); Makoto Nakazono (Note: Credited as Director (監督, Kantoku) for Seasons Spring & Summer only.); Keisuke Shinohara	January 14, 2020	December 29, 2020	24	Based on the smartphone game by Liber Entertainment. Co-animated with 3Hz.
Appare-Ranman!	Masakazu Hashimoto	April 10, 2020	September 25, 2020	13	Original work.
The Day I Became a God	Yoshiyuki Asai	October 11, 2020	December 27, 2020	12	A collaboration project with Key and Aniplex. Original work. Story originally conceived by Jun Maeda.
The Aquatope on White Sand	Toshiya Shinohara	July 9, 2021	December 17, 2021	24	Original work.
Ya Boy Kongming!	Shū Honma	April 5, 2022	June 21, 2022	12	Based on the manga by Yūto Yotsuba and Ryō Ogawa.
Akiba Maid War	Sōichi Masui	October 7, 2022	December 23, 2022	12	A collaboration project with Cygames. Original work.
Buddy Daddies	Yoshiyuki Asai	January 7, 2023	April 1, 2023	12	Original work.
Skip and Loafer	Kotomi Deai	April 4, 2023	June 20, 2023	12	Based on the manga by Misaki Takamatsu.
Sakuna: Of Rice and Ruin	Masayuki Yoshihara	July 6, 2024	September 28, 2024	13	Based on the video game by Edelweiss.
Narenare: Cheer for You!	Kōdai Kakimoto	July 7, 2024	September 23, 2024	12	A collaboration project with DMM.com. Original work.
Mayonaka Punch	Shū Honma	July 8, 2024	September 23, 2024	12	Original work.
Food for the Soul	Shinya Kawatsura; Yū Harumi	April 13, 2025	June 29, 2025	12	Original work. Story originally conceived by Atto.
Dealing with Mikadono Sisters Is a Breeze	Tadahito Matsubayashi	July 10, 2025	September 25, 2025	12	Based on the manga by Aya Hirakawa.
Dusk Beyond the End of the World	Naokatsu Tsuda	September 26, 2025	December 19, 2025	13	Studio's 25th anniversary project. Original work.
The Laid-Off Cheat-Granting Mage Enjoys a Second Lease on Life	Shū Honma	October 7, 2026	TBA	TBA	Based on the light novel by Asa Rokushima.
Skip and Loafer 2	Kotomi Deai	April 2027	TBA	TBA	Based on the manga by Misaki Takamatsu and sequel to Skip and Loafer.

=== Films ===
Title	Director	Release date	Notes
Professor Layton and the Eternal Diva	Masakazu Hashimoto	December 19, 2009	Co-produced with OLM, Inc. and Robot Communications. Continuation of the Professor Layton video game series.
Mai no Mahō to Katei no Hi	Masayuki Yoshihara	February 20, 2011	TV film.
Bannou Yasai Ninninman	Masayuki Yoshihara	March 5, 2011	Collaboration with the Japanese Animation Creators Association young animators training project.
Hanasaku Iroha: The Movie – Home Sweet Home	Masahiro Andō	March 30, 2013	Sequel to Hanasaku Iroha.
Maquia: When the Promised Flower Blooms	Mari Okada	February 24, 2018	Original work. Shortlisted for Academy Award for Best Animated Feature.
Shirobako: The Movie	Tsutomu Mizushima	February 29, 2020	Sequel to Shirobako.
Komada: A Whisky Family	Masayuki Yoshihara	November 10, 2023	Original work.
Colorful Stage! The Movie: A Miku Who Can't Sing	Hiroyuki Hata	January 17, 2025	Based on the smartphone game by Colorful Palette.
Dive in Wonderland	Toshiya Shinohara	August 29, 2025	Based on the children's novel Alice's Adventures in Wonderland by Lewis Carroll.
Girls und Panzer: Motto Love Love Sakusen Desu!	Masami Shimoda	December 26, 2025 (part 1); January 30, 2026 (part 2); March 6, 2026 (part 3); April 10, 2026 (part 4)	Based on the manga by Maruko Nii and spin-off of Girls und Panzer. Co-animated with Actas.

=== Video game animated sequences ===
- Professor Layton and the Curious Village
- Professor Layton and the Diabolical Box
- Professor Layton and the Unwound Future
- Professor Layton and the Last Specter
- Professor Layton and the Miracle Mask
- Professor Layton and the Azran Legacy
- Triggerheart Exelica -Enhanced-
- Wild Arms 3 with Bee Train
- League of Legends Season 2019 / Season 9: A New Journey

=== Others ===
- Anime project tourism Toyama: Animation part
  - Longing for a Tear Bringing Sky "Lovers in Tateyama"
  - Longing for a Tear Bringing Sea "A Friendship on the Beach"
  - Longing for a Tear Bringing Cuisine "Grandpa in Gokayama"
