= Katsuhisa Hōki =

Japanese actor

- 宝亀克寿
- Born: October 30, 1946 (age 79); Nagasaki Prefecture, Japan
- Occupations: Actor; voice actor
- Years active: 1981–present
- Agent: Aoni Production

Katsuhisa Hōki (宝亀克寿, Hōki Katsuhisa; born October 30, 1946) is a Japanese actor. He is affiliated with Aoni Production. His former stage name is Katsuaki Hōki (箒克朗, Hōki Katsuaki). He is best known for his roles in Transformers: Armada (as Smokescreen), Higurashi When They Cry (as Teppei Hōjō), and One Piece (as Gecko Moria and Jinbei).

== Filmography ==
=== Television drama ===
1983

- Oshin

=== Television animation ===
1988

- Soreike! Anpanman (Doctor Hiyari (substitute), Amefuri Oni, Priest Ishiuse)

1994

- Mahōjin Guru Guru (Middle-aged weapons-seller, Village Headman Kocchi)

1995

- Fushigi Yūgi (High Official #A, Elder)
- Ōgon Yūsha Goldran (Sumiinkusu)
- Romeo no Aoi Sora (King of Italy)
- Slayers (Bandit Boss, Rodimus)

1996

- Cinderella Monogatari (Pierre, Hans, Gandis)
- Midori no Makibaō (Tachihara)

1997

- Chūka Ichiban! (Raache)
- Hakugei Densetsu (Cook)
- Detective Conan (Ryōta Adachi, henchman)
- Super Fisher Grander Musashi (Ossan)
- Yūsha Ō GaoGaiGar (High school principal, monitor voice)

1998

- Cowboy Bebop (Baker Panchoreno)
- Doraemon (Dinosaur hunter)
- Grander Musashi RV (Tōru)
- Detective Conan (Takagaki)
- Nintama Rantarō (Bandit, shopkeeper)

1999

- The Big O (Sam)
- Detective Conan (Michio Morioka, Shōji Terabayashi, Yūzō Takeda)
- Zoids (Gloskov)

2000

- Doraemon (Prosecutor)

2001

- Galaxy Angel (Superior officer)

2002

- Kidō Senshi Gundam SEED (Gerard Garcia)
- Detective Conan (Shirō Kawabata, mail clerk)

2003

- Detective Conan (Chief, Sōhei Dejima)
- Nintama Rantarō (Sagitarō Kuronejū)

2004

- Bakuretsu Tenshi (Governor Ishihara)
- Galaxy Angel X (Superior officer)
- Kaiketsu Zorori (Suzuki Santa)
- Detective Conan (Jitsu Shirai)
- Samurai Champloo (Daigorō)
- Zoids Fuzors (Delegation leader)

2005

- Black Jack (Jinmen Kasa)
- Doraemon (Kaminari)
- Gun x Sword (Bariyo)
- Naruto (Mōsō)

2006

- Black Jack (Manager)
- Black Jack 21 (Debun, cabinet minister)
- Code Geass: Hangyaku no Lelouch (Bartley Asprius)
- Death Note (Kiichirō Osoreda)
- Demashita! Powerpuff Girls Z (Santa Claus)
- Higurashi no Naku Koro ni (Teppei Hōjō)
- Ginga Densetsu Weed (Ben)
- Kiba (King Bakkam)
- Majime ni Fumajime: Kaiketsu Zorori (Sōkamone)
- Nintama Rantarō (Jinbei Tasogane)

2007

- Bokurano (Yūzō Odaka)
- Crayon Shin-chan (Konga)
- Darker Than Black (Naoyasu Kirihara)
- Devil May Cry: The Animated Series (Catholic priest)
- Higurashi no Naku Koro ni Kai (Teppei Hōjō)
- Detective Conan (Kōsei Tsuchio, Morizō Daiyama)
- Pokemon: Diamond & Pearl (Oji-san)
- Romeo x Juliet (Conrad)
- Ryūsei no Rockman Tribe (Agame)
- Shakugan no Shana (Behemoth)

2008

- Code Geass: Hangyaku no Lelouch R2 (Bartley Asprius)
- GeGeGe no Kitarō 4th series (Jubokko) (ep. 67)
- One Piece (Gecko Moria)
- Slayers Revolution (Child #A)
- Soul Eater (Kaizō Rasputin)

2009

- Crayon Shin-chan (Staff member)
- Fullmetal Alchemist: Brotherhood (General Raven)
- Inazuma Eleven (Seijirō Kira)
- Needless (Vonsangar)
- Nintama Rantarō (Mansion owner)
- Pokemon: Diamond & Pearl (Mitsuzō)
- Slayers Evolution-R (Rodimus)

2010

- Detective Conan (Kengo Shuntō)
- One Piece (Jinbe (ep. 440+), replacing Daisuke Gori)
- Super Robot Wars Original Generation: The Inspector (Van Vat Tram)

2011

- Mai no Mahō to Katei no Hi (Reizō Tatsumi)
- Nurarihyon no Mago (Kuramayama no Ootengu)
- Naruto Shippuden (Sabu)
- Shakugan no Shana III Final (Behemoth)

2013

- The Devil Is a Part-Timer! (Olba Meiyā)

2014

- Gundam Build Fighters Try (Mr. Ral) (eps. 5-25)
- Garo: The Animation (Garcia)

2015

- Gangsta. (Daniel Monroe)
- Rampo Kitan: Game of Laplace (Ryūichirō Munakata)

2016

- JoJo's Bizarre Adventure: Diamond Is Unbreakable – Ryōhei Higashikata

2017

- Kirakira PreCure a la Mode (Yuu Tachibana)

2018

- GeGeGe no Kitarō 6th series (Kaminari) (ep. 5)

2019

- Babylon (novel series) Babylon (Ryūichirō Nomaru)
- Fire Force (Onyango)

2023

- Bikkuri-Men (Khan)

2024

- Meiji Gekken: 1874 (Ryūzō Moriya)

2025

- Hazure Skill "Kinomi Master" (Torahige)
- Zenshu (Capitan)

=== Original video animation (OVA) ===
- Konpeki no Kantai (1993) (Admiral Otowa Kuki, Hiroshi Ogawa)

=== Drama CDs ===
- Netsujou no Ori de Nemure (????) (Taizou Tamiya)

=== Theatrical animation ===
- Gekijōban Naruto Daikatsugeki! Yukihime Ninpōchō Dattebayo!! (2004) (Great Devil King)
- Pocket Monsters Advanced Generation the Movie: The Pokémon Ranger and Prince of the Sea - Manaphy (2006) (Tab)
- Doraemon: Nobita's Great Battle of the Mermaid King (2010) (Commander Rosy Grub/Tragis)
- Doraemon: New Nobita's Great Demon—Peko and the Exploration Party of Five (2014) (Kaminari-san)
- Shimajiro in Bookland (2016) (Voice)
- Dragon Ball Super: Broly (2018) (Paragus)
- The First Slam Dunk (2022) (Mitsuyoshi Anzai)
- Crayon Shin-chan the Movie: Super Hot! The Spicy Kasukabe Dancers (2025) (Flagtateruder)

=== Theme park ride ===
- Indiana Jones Adventure: Temple of the Crystal Skull (Voice of Paco)

=== Video games ===
- .hack//G.U. (2006) (Grein)
- Injustice: Gods Among Us (2013) (Uncredited voice)
- Max Payne (2001) (Deputy Police Chief Jim Bravura, Angelo Punchinello)
- Metroid: Other M (2010) (Colonel)
- One Piece: Unlimited Cruise (2008) (Gecko Moria)
- Ratchet & Clank (2002) (WaterWorker)
- Ratchet & Clank: Going Commando (2003) (Waterworker)
- Ratchet & Clank Future: Tools of Destruction (2007) (Captain Slag, Plumber)
- Spyro the Dragon (1998) (Gnasty Gnorc, Dragon)
- Wild Arms 5 (2006) (Captain Bartholomew)
- Tokyo Afterschool Summoners Gyūmao (2018)

=== Tokusatsu ===
- Shuriken Sentai Ninninger (2015) (Youkai Umibōzu) (ep. 17)

=== Dubbing ===
==== Live action film ====
- The 6th Day (Robert Marshall (Michael Rooker))
- Australia (Kipling Flynn (Jack Thompson))
- The Ballad of Buster Scruggs (Trapper (Chelcie Ross))
- Basquiat (The Electrician (Willem Dafoe))
- Big Fish (Karl the Giant (Matthew McGrory))
- Biker Boyz (Smoke (Laurence Fishburne))
- Black Widow (General Dreykov (Ray Winstone))
- Bombshell (Roger Ailes (John Lithgow))
- The Bone Collector (2002 TV Asahi edition) (Detective Paulie Sellitto (Ed O'Neill))
- Bounce (Jim Willer (Joe Morton))
- Brawl in Cell Block 99 (Warden Tuggs (Don Johnson))
- The Cider House Rules (Arthur Rose (Delroy Lindo))
- Clifford the Big Red Dog (Mr. Packard (David Alan Grier))
- Cold Case (Detective Will Jeffries (Thom Barry))
- Con Air (2000 TV Asahi edition) (Nathan "Diamond Dog" Jones (Ving Rhames))
- The Count (2014 Star Channel edition) (Tailor (Eric Campbell))
- The Crown (Winston Churchill (John Lithgow))
- Demon Knight (Sheriff Tupper (John Schuck))
- Denial (David Irving (Timothy Spall))
- Don't Be Afraid of the Dark (William Harris (Jack Thompson))
- Dr. Dolittle 2 (Eldon (James Avery))
- Dr. Strangelove (General Buck Turgidson (George C. Scott))
- Dreamgirls (Marty Madison (Danny Glover))
- The Dust Factory (Grandpa Randolph (Armin Mueller-Stahl))
- Ed (Tipton (Bill Cobbs))
- The Fabelmans (Boris Podgorny (Judd Hirsch))
- Fallen (Lou (James Gandolfini))
- Frank Herbert's Dune (Baron Vladimir Harkonnen (Ian McNeice))
- Fringe (Sanford Harris (Michael Gaston))
- From Vegas to Macau (Benz (Hui Shiu-hung))
- Furiosa: A Mad Max Saga (Ridsdale Pell (Lachy Hulme))
- Get Smart (2011 TV Asahi edition) (Shtarker (Ken Davitian))
- The Glenn Miller Story (2000 TV Tokyo edition) (Louis Armstrong)
- God of Gamblers II (Uncle Three (Ng Man-tat))
- Hard Target (1997 Fuji TV edition) (Randal Poe (Eliott Keener))
- The Heartbreak Kid (Doc Cantrow (Jerry Stiller))
- The Hole in the Ground (Des Brady (James Cosmo))
- Horizon Line (Freddy Wyman (Keith David))
- Indiana Jones and the Dial of Destiny (Sallah (John Rhys-Davies))
- Irréversible (The Man (Philippe Nahon))
- Just Wright (Lloyd Wright (James Pickens Jr.))
- The King's Speech (Winston Churchill (Timothy Spall))
- Lakeview Terrace (Harold Perreau (Ron Glass))
- Léon: The Professional (1997 VHS edition) (Mathilda's Father (Michael Badalucco))
- Live and Let Die (2006 Blu-Ray edition) (Sheriff J.W. Pepper (Clifton James))
- The Lost Daughter (Professor Cole (Alexandros Mylonas))
- The Man Who Invented Christmas (Edward Chapman (Ian McNeice))
- Mary Poppins Returns (Mr. Dawes Jr. (Dick Van Dyke))
- Missing (Javier (Joaquim de Almeida))
- Narc (Captain Cheevers (Chi McBride))
- The Natural (Pop Fisher (Wilford Brimley))
- Not Safe for Work (Alan Z. Emmerich (Christian Clemenson))
- Obsessed (Joe Gage (Bruce McGill))
- Paddington (Uncle Pastuzo (Michael Gambon))
- Paddington 2 (Uncle Pastuzo (Michael Gambon))
- Police Story (2012 Ultimate Blu-Ray edition) ("Uncle" Bill Wong (Bill Tung))
- Police Story 2 (2010 Blu-Ray edition) ("Uncle" Bill Wong (Bill Tung))
- Quantum Apocalypse (Dr. Zulkowski (Jerry Leggio))
- Red Dwarf (The Universe)
- Rogue Trader (Ron Baker (Nigel Lindsay))
- Rush (Lauda's Grandfather (Hans-Eckart Eckhardt))
- Safe House (David Barlow (Brendan Gleeson))
- A Series of Unfortunate Events (Sir (Don Johnson))
- The Specialist (Joe Leon (Rod Steiger))
- Strike (Tony Landry (Martin Shaw))
- The Terminator (1998 DVD edition) (Ed Traxler (Paul Winfield))
- Tin Cup (Earl (Dennis Burkley))
- Today You Die (Max (Kevin Tighe))
- The Vagabond (2014 Star Channel edition) (Gypsy Chieftain (Eric Campbell))
- Victoria & Abdul (Bertie, Prince of Wales (Eddie Izzard))

==== Animation ====
- The Addams Family (Grandpa Frump)
- The Amazing World of Gumball (Mr. Robinson)
- Coco (Chicharrón)
- The Cuphead Show! (Elder Kettle)
- Trolls World Tour (King Quincy)
- Alice in Wonderland (DVD edition, additional scene) (Dodo)
- Batman: The Animated Series (Rupert Thorne (second voice))
- Batman: The Brave and the Bold (Wong Fei)
- Bee Movie (Lou Lo Duca)
- Bionicle 2: Legends of Metru Nui (Krekka)
- Courage the Cowardly Dog (Doctor Vindaloo, Sergeant, Le Quack)
- Cow and Chicken (Blind Mudpuddle Johnson)
- Curious George (film) (Ivan the Doorman)
- Curious George (TV series) (Chef Pisghetti)
- Dexter's Laboratory (Koosalagoopagoop)
- Donkey Kong Country (Kaptain Skurvy)
- Harley Quinn (Darkseid)
- Hey Arnold!: The Movie (Grandpa "Steely" Phil)
- The Jungle Book 2 (Ranjan's Father)
- Kim Possible (Motor Ed)
- The Land Before Time series (Daddy Topps)
- Lilo & Stitch (Moses Puloki)
- Monsters University (Don)
- My Friends Tigger & Pooh (Beaver)
- My Little Pony: Friendship Is Magic (Fluttershy, when affected by poison joke)
- The Penguins of Madagascar (Maurice, Loi)
- Quack Pack (Captain Fedgewick Octavius Storm, Flint Steele)
- Recess (Hank)
- Ruby Gloom (Skele-T)
- Shirt Tales
- The Simpsons (Sergeant Seymour Skinner)
- Star Wars: The Clone Wars (Gha Nachkt)
- Superman: The Animated Series (General Hardcastle)
- Teenage Mutant Ninja Turtles (Commander Mozar)
- Transformers The Rebirth (Road Zaraku, Punch, Duros)
