= True Tears (TV series) =

Japanese anime television series

- Japanese DVD cover of True Tears volume 7 featuring the main characters
- Genre: Romance, slice of life
- Created by: La'cryma
- Anime television series
- Directed by: Junji Nishimura
- Produced by: Kenji Horikawa
- Written by: Mari Okada
- Music by: Hajime Kikuchi
- Studio: P.A. Works
- Licensed by: NA: Discotek Media
- Original network: tvk, KTV, CTC, TVS, THK, BS11, Kids Station
- Original run: January 6, 2008 – March 30, 2008
- Episodes: 13
- icon

True Tears (stylized as true tears) is a Japanese anime television series produced by P.A. Works and directed by Junji Nishimura. It aired in Japan on tvk between January 6, 2008, and March 30, 2008, containing thirteen episodes. The series shares almost nothing in common with the visual novel of the same name that preceded it, using an entirely different story with different characters, and a different art style. An Internet radio show hosted by three voice actresses from the series was also produced to promote it. A Blu-ray box set released in Japan contained an extra three-minute epilogue. Bandai Entertainment initially released the series in North America, but the license was later transferred to Discotek Media.

== Plot ==
True Tears revolves around a high school student named Shin'ichirō Nakagami with a high artistic ability. He lives with his mother, father, and fellow high school student Hiromi Yuasa who moved into his house after her father died. Her father had been a close friend of the family, so it was natural for Hiromi to come stay with the Nakagami family; one year has passed since she came to live in their home.

Shin'ichirō has known Hiromi for years, but before he had always treasured her smile, though now she acts coldly when at home and he cannot bring up the nerve to talk with her either. When she is at school, Hiromi is popular, always smiles, and is talented in sports, but Shin'ichirō knows she must be hiding things inside her. At school, he meets a strange girl named Noe Isurugi who wishes him misfortune after Shin'ichirō teases her.

After a bit of bad luck, he reconciles with Noe by crafting a chicken out of a tissue box, and he finds out from her that she "gave her tears away". Shin'ichirō also likes to spend time with his childhood friends Miyokichi Nobuse and Aiko Endō at the Imagawayaki shop Aiko's family owns, and she helps out at the shop too. Shin'ichirō juggles all of these problems on a day-to-day basis as he learns about love and the sadness of those around him.

The opening video of the anime contains shots of the Tateyama mountain range in Toyama Prefecture, Japan, and is where the series is set. Incidentally, the animation studio which produced the anime, P.A. Works, is located in Nanto, Toyama, and places in the series are modeled after that town. However, the town in True Tears faces the sea, and in reality Nanto is inland. The seaside was modeled after Himi, Toyama, the shopping center from Toyama, Toyama, and Aiko's shop and the fountain in the park were modeled from Takaoka, Toyama. Furthermore, three surnames used in the series—Isurugi, Kurobe, and Takaoka—are place names in Toyama Prefecture.

== Characters ==
Shin'ichirō Nakagami (仲上 眞一郎, Nakagami Shin'ichirō)
Voiced by: Makoto Ishii

True Tears main characters (from left to right): Shin'ichirō, Noe, Hiromi, Aiko, and Miyokichi.

Shin'ichirō is a male high school student who enjoys drawing, and even starts working on a picture book. He lives with his mother, father, and childhood friend Hiromi Yuasa. She used to smile around him, though does not anymore when at home. Shin'ichirō longs to see her smile again which he loved so much as a kid. He is living a relatively normal life until he meets a strange girl named Noe Isurugi who curses him with misfortune after he teases her a bit, though he reconciles with her soon after. Shin'ichirō is frustrated by not being able to see emotion from Hiromi, and other pressures from his family, such as a traditional Japanese dance he does not want to practice. However, he eventually gives in to practicing hard for the dance due to comments made by Noe. He and Hiromi start a relationship.
Noe Isurugi (石動 乃絵, Isurugi Noe)
Voiced by: Ayahi Takagaki
Noe Isurugi is an odd girl at Shin'ichirō's school. He first meets her up in a tree where she is picking silverberries for a chicken she named Raigomaru in a coop on a campus. Shin'ichirō ends up having to catch her as she jumps from the tree since she was stuck and could not get down on her own. She likes chickens, though would only feed one of them since she says "it could fly" while the other cannot. After the chicken gets killed by a raccoon, Noe becomes saddened, but does not cry because she "gave away her tears". She later explains that after her grandmother died, she was unable to cry anymore due to her grandmother telling her that when she dies she will take Noe's tears away with her. She develops feelings for Shin'ichirō and even goes out with him for a time, until she discovers his true feelings for Hiromi. Noe has an older brother, Jun, who is a basketball team captain at another high school. Noe is known to have a frank personality and speaks honestly to other people. She seems to be able to judge people's feelings to a certain extent.
Hiromi Yuasa (湯浅 比呂美, Yuasa Hiromi)
Voiced by: Kaori Nazuka
Hiromi is a girl Shin'ichirō's age and goes to the same high school as him. After her father died, she came to live with Shin'ichirō's family and has already been living with them for a year when the story begins. She has been in the same class as Shin'ichirō since elementary school, though despite being cheerful back then, she now acts a bit cold when living at his home. In contrast, she normally smiles and is popular at school. She often helps out with Shin'ichirō's father's work as they are low on manpower. She is a very good player on her school's girls' basketball team and is number six. It is clear that Hiromi has feelings for Shin'ichirō, but she decided to lock these feelings inside when she began living with Shin'ichirō. It is suggested that she hides these feelings because Shin'ichirō's mother told her, prior to the start of the story, that Shin'ichirō is her brother, which is later proven false.
Aiko Andō (安藤 愛子, Andō Aiko)
Voiced by: Yuka Iguchi
Aiko is a girl one year older than Shin'ichirō who attends a different school than he does. She is going out with his friend Miyokichi Nobuse, but has feelings for Shin'ichirō. Aiko continuously tries to get closer with Shin'ichirō, such as asking him to go shopping with her instead of Miyokichi, and when she goes out with Miyokichi, she does not have the same vigor as when she is just with Shin'ichirō. Aiko has known Shin'ichirō since they were kids, and was introduced to Miyokichi through Shin'ichirō. She helps out at her family's Imagawayaki shop named Imagawayaki Ai-chan. She is shorter than Shin'ichirō, and enjoys teasing him from time to time.
Miyokichi Nobuse (野伏 三代吉, Nobuse Miyokichi)
Voiced by: Hiroyuki Yoshino
Miyokichi is Shin'ichirō's good friend, and has known him since they were kids. They hang out together at school, and Miyokichi often brings up the fact that Shin'ichirō has an eye out for Hiromi when at school. Shin'ichirō introduced Miyokichi to Aiko which eventually led to Miyokichi asking out Aiko, and she agreed, though it is apparent that she agreed reluctantly. He did not seem to notice that Aiko has feelings for Shin'ichirō until she revealed it to him in a subtle way. In the end, Aiko wanted to start all over again with Miyokichi.
Tomoyo Kurobe (黒部 朋与, Kurobe Tomoyo)
Voiced by: Tomomi Watanabe
Tomoyo is Hiromi's friend whom she often hangs out with and fellow member of the girls' basketball team. She is sure that Hiromi likes Shin'ichirō, but Hiromi constantly denies it. When Hiromi is troubled by something, Tomoyo worries about her.
Munehiro Nakagami (仲上宗弘, Nakagami Munehiro)
Voiced by: Keiji Fujiwara
He is Shin'ichirō's father and was good friends with Hiromi's father. After Hiromi's father died, he took her in. Unlike his wife, he respects his son's privacy and lets him do as he wishes, saying that "Shin'ichirō is Shin'ichirō". Furthermore, he considers Hiromi to be a member of the family and does not treat her badly like his wife.
Shiori Nakagami (仲上しをり, Nakagami Shiori)
Voiced by: Rieko Takahashi
She is Shin'ichirō's mother; she likes to do what she thinks is best for her son, and tries to look after him. She has been known to read his mail if she deems necessary and often bugs him about things at school, or if his jacket smells. She takes favor over Shin'ichirō and does not consider Hiromi her child. She often shows hostile attitudes to Hiromi, and this has made her distant from her son. Eventually, she reconciles with Hiromi and tells her that she made up the story about Hiromi being her husband's child.
Jun Isurugi (石動 純, Isurugi Jun)
Voiced by: Yūki Masuda
Jun is Noe's older brother. He is the captain of the basketball team at his school and is number four in his team. He is shown to have more feelings for Noe than just a normal sibling's relationship. He asks Shin'ichirō to ask Noe out, but Shin'ichirō merely gets annoyed at him. However, when Shin'ichirō requests that Jun go out with Hiromi in return for going out with his sister Noe, he agrees immediately. Even though he is acting, Jun does not seem to hold any feelings for Hiromi.
Rumi Takaoka (高岡 ルミ, Takaoka Rumi)
Voiced by: Jun Miruno
Rumi is the captain of the girls' basketball team that Hiromi and Tomoyo play on.

== Production ==
The animated television series True Tears is directed by Junji Nishimura and produced by P.A. Works, Lantis, and Bandai Visual, with the animation and music produced by P.A. Works and Lantis respectively. The anime shares its title with the visual novel True Tears by La'cryma, but uses an entirely different story with different characters, and a different art style. The series aired between January 6, 2008, and March 30, 2008, on TV Kanagawa in Japan, although a special preview of the first episode was shown on January 4, 2008, on BS11 Digital. The anime also aired at later dates on Chiba TV, Kansai TV, Kids Station, Tōkai TV, TV Saitama, and BS11 Digital. Thirteen episodes aired on the aforementioned networks. A DVD compilation, containing the first episode of the anime, was released on March 25, 2008, in Japan. A Blu-ray box set released in Japan contains an extra three-minute epilogue to the series unveiling the future of the main characters after the anime's conclusion.

The anime was licensed by Bandai Visual in North America, but the release was delayed. After Bandai Visual USA folded into Bandai Entertainment, the True Tears anime was released in a two-disc DVD box set on August 18, 2009, with English subtitles. Later, Discotek Media released the anime in a two-disc DVD box set on August 30, 2016, then on Blu-ray on October 31, 2017.

Three pieces of theme music are used for the anime; one opening theme, one ending theme, and one insert song. The opening theme is "Reflectier" (リフレクティア, Rifurekutia) by Eufonius, the ending theme is Aira Yūki's "Sekai no Namida" (セカイノナミダ; lit. 'Tears of the World'), and the insert song, used in episode ten, is "Sono Mama no Boku de" (そのままの僕で) by Eufonius. A single for "Reflectier" was released on January 23, 2008, and a single for "Sekai no Namida" was released on February 6, 2008. The anime's original soundtrack was released on February 27, 2008, and an image song album entitled Tears...for truth containing the insert song was released on April 16, 2008.

== Internet radio show ==
An Internet radio show called True Tears Kochira Tulip Hōsōkyoku (true tears こちらチューリップ放送局), hosted by Charradio, was broadcast between December 7, 2007, and December 28, 2007, containing four episodes. The following week, the show was transferred over to Beat Net Radio!, and began weekly broadcasts every Friday starting on January 4, 2008. It has three hosts — Ayahi Takagaki, Kaori Nazuka, and Yuka Iguchi, who played Noe Isurugi, Hiromi Yuasa, and Aiko Endō in the anime respectively — and was produced by Bandai Visual and Lantis. There are three corners on the show, which is used mainly to promote the anime version. Makoto Ishii, who played Shin'ichirō in the anime, appeared on the show as a guest for the seventh and eighth broadcasts, and the anime's director Junji Nishimura was a guest for the ninth episode.
