= Kenji Horikawa =

Japanese anime producer

- 堀川 憲司
- Born: May 5, 1965 (age 61); Kōnan, Aichi, Japan
- Occupation: Anime producer
- Employer(s): P.A. Works; Bee Train.
- Known for: P.A. Works animation studio

Kenji Horikawa (堀川 憲司, Horikawa, Kenji) is the founder and president of P.A. Works Studio and the operations director for Bee Train productions Inc. He was also formerly an employee with Production I.G and Tatsunoko Productions. In 2000 he founded P.A. Works and currently produces the works produced by the studio. Horikawa has also worked as a production manager and productionAssistant.

== Filmography ==
- Another (2012) (producer and planning)
- Hanasaku Iroha (2011) (producer)
- Mai's Magic and Family Day (2011) (producer)
- Bannō Yasai Ninninman (producer)
- Angel Beats (2010) (producer)
- Professor Layton and the Eternal Diva (2009) (producer)
- Canaan (2009) (producer)
- True Tears (2008) (producer)
- Immortal Grand Prix (2005) (production desk for P.A. Works)
- Wild Arms 3 (2002) (animation producer)
- Medabots (1999) (producer)
- Wild Arms: Twilight Venom (1999) (line producer)
- Popolocrois Story (1998) (series composition and line producer)
- Xenogears (1998) (animation cut scene producer)
- Jin-Roh: The Wolf Brigade (line producer and production manager)
- Panzer Dragoon (1996 OAV) (production manager)
- Neon Genesis Evangelion (production manager)
