= Eufonius =

Japanese pop rock band

- Origin: Japan
- Genres: Progressive rock, pop rock, power pop
- Years active: 2003–present
- Labels: King Records, Lantis
- Members: Riya; Masashi Ōkubo
- Past members: Hajime Kikuchi
- Website: www.eufonius.net

Eufonius is a Japanese progressive pop rock music group which debuted on October 11, 2003, with the release of their first album Eufonius which was also an independent release. The band has produced songs for various anime and video games, such as Kashimashi: Girl Meets Girl, Himawari!, Noein, True Tears, Yosuga no Sora, Kokoro Connect, Shinkyoku Sōkai Polyphonica and visual novels like Key's Clannad and Favorite's Irotoridori no Sekai. The band is composed of two primary members, Riya—who provided vocals and the majority of the lyrics—and Hajime Kikuchi—who plays the keyboard and handles composition, arrangement, and sometimes the lyrics. The third member is Masashi Ōkubo, who is a supporting member of the group.

They have released 17 studio albums as of June 2016, and have provided their talents in compilation albums and original soundtracks as well. Eufonius has hosted an Internet radio show called Frequency-e since May 2005 with broadcasts being released in irregular intervals; as of December 2011, there have been 12 broadcasts. On September 8, 2012, it was announced that Hajime Kikuchi would leave the band "for now", after making some degrading comments at singer Halko Momoi. Kikuchi returned in 2013 with the composition of the song "Lovely Smile", used as a theme song of Hooksoft's visual novel Lovely Quest: Unlimited.

Hajime Kikuchi died of acute heart failure on November 16, 2023, at the age of 44.

== Members ==
- Riya — lyrics and vocals
- Hajime Kikuchi (菊地 創, Kikuchi Hajime) — composition and arrangement on the keyboard, and sometimes the songwriter.
- Masashi Ōkubo (大久保 将, Ōkubo Masashi) — supporting member

== Discography ==
Studio albums

- Eufonius (2003)
- Eufonius+ (2005)
- Subarashiki Sekai (スバラシキセカイ) (2006)
- Σ (2007)
- Metafysik (2007)
- Metro Chrome (メトロクローム) (2008)
- Nejimaki Musica (ねじまきむじか) (2009)
- Ao no Scape (碧のスケープ) (2009)
- Nejimaki Musica 2 (ねじまきむじか2) (2010)
- Bezel (2011)
- Aletheia (アレセイア) (2011)
- Phonon (フォノン) (2011)
- Nejimaki Musica 3 (ねじまきむじか3) (2012)
- Frasco (2014)
- Kioku Seizu (記憶星図) (2014)
- Noesis (ノエシス, Noeshisu) (2015)
- Sorafuruhate (ソラフルハテ) (2016)
- Phols (2021)

Compilation album

- Kalyteryz (Greek: Καλυτερυζ) (2015)

== Internet radio show ==
Eufonius hosts an Internet radio show called Frequency-e which had its first broadcast on May 30, 2005. The broadcasts are hosted by Riya and Hajime Kikuchi, and are available for download at Eufonius' official website. Eufonius had originally planned to put out a new broadcast once a month, but due to being busy, they only release two or three a year in irregular intervals. As of December 17, 2011, there have been 12 broadcasts. The show primarily consists of Eufonius' members conversing, responding to listener's messages, or giving updates or general information on releases by the band. The name of the show comes from the name of the band's official website.
