= See Me After Class =

Original video animation and manga

- Volume 1 of Asa Made Jugyō Chu!, published by Media Factory.

朝まで授業chu! (Asa Made Jugyō Chu!)
- Genre: Harem
- Manga
- Written by: Akiyoshi Ohta
- Illustrated by: Munyū
- Published by: Media Factory
- English publisher: NA: Digital Manga
- Imprint: MF Comics Alive Series
- Magazine: Monthly Comic Alive
- Original run: June 27, 2008 – January 2016
- Volumes: 4
- Original video animation
- Directed by: Hiromitsu Kanazawa
- Produced by: Shinsaku Tanaka; Masatoshi Takahashi
- Written by: Hiromitsu Kanazawa
- Music by: Funta
- Studio: GoHands
- Released: June 23, 2012
- Runtime: 30 minutes

See Me After Class (Japanese: 朝まで授業chu!, Hepburn: Asa Made Jugyō Chu!) is a Japanese manga series written by Akiyoshi Ohta and illustrated by Munyū. It is serialized in Media Factory's Monthly Comic Alive from 2008 to 2015, and was released in four bound volumes. The story focuses on Yuuki Kagami, a male student who is accidentally assigned a room in the girls' dormitory by his homeroom teacher Ayana Kakinozaka. In order to avoid getting expelled, he must cross-dress when in the girls' dormitory.

Digital Manga has licensed the manga in English, and published three tankōbon volumes in North America. Sharp Point Press has also licensed See Me After Class in five other countries. The series was adapted into an original video animation (OVA) by animation studio GoHands, and came bundled in a special edition of the third volume. The series has received mixed reviews from a variety of anime and manga critics.

== Plot ==
Due to an error, newly enrolled Otorinashi Academy student, Yuuki Kagami, is assigned a room in the girls' dormitory, even though Yuuki is a boy. Since none of the other rooms for boys are available, he ends up having to share the room with Ayana Kakinozaka, his beautiful but ditzy homeroom teacher and self-proclaimed guardian who made the mistake in the first place. To avoid getting kicked out of the school for being a boy in a girls' dormitory, Yuuki must cross-dress whenever he is outside his room and when he is not in his classes. Yuuki meets several other characters in Otorinashi Academy, the first being Risa Takabane, whom he accidentally walks into, leaving a bad impression. Risa finds out about his situation, but decides to keep it a secret, on the condition he becomes her slave. Over the course of the series, he encounters other girls including student council president Patricia Bepouin, most of whom have a romantic and/or a strong sexual attraction to him.

== Characters ==
See Me After Class main characters (from left to right): Top row: Yuuki Kagami, Ayana Kakinozaka; Bottom row: Risa Takabane, Patricia Bepouin.

=== Main ===
Yuuki Kagami (加賀見 優希, Kagami Yūki)
Voiced by: Asami Shimoda (Japanese)
Yuuki is the main protagonist of the story. In the beginning, he is accidentally assigned a room in the girls' dormitory, but in order to stay in school, he must cross dress in the dorm. This proves to be fairly easy due to his timid personality and feminine features. He is good-willed, as when girls try to make a move on him, he will usually resist their advances. Yuuki is quite down to earth and responsible, especially when compared to the likes of Ayana-sensei. If someone touches the knot on top of his head, he seems to become aroused.
Ayana Kakinozaka (柿乃坂 綾奈, Kakinozaka Ayana)
Voiced by: Azumi Asakura (Japanese)
A young well-endowed teacher at Yuuki's school. She means well, but is rather ditzy, having inadvertently registered Yuuki in the girls' dormitory due to his gender-ambiguous name. However, she takes responsibility by having him live in her dorm room, and making him cross-dress as a girl. Similarly she tries to solve other problems in questionable and humiliating ways such as showing her naked body to him in place of the dorm's ban on pornographic magazines. Though Ayana makes mistakes often, she is quite determined to help Yuuki as best as she can.
Risa Takabane (鷹羽 理沙, Takabane Risa)
Voiced by: Suzuko Mimori (Japanese)
A schoolmate who acts cold towards Yuuki, as she hates men because she does not like that they look at it. However, after finding out about his situation, she promises not to reveal the secret on the condition that he becomes her slave. She then requests to be his roommate as a master should naturally be with her slave. She harbors romantic feelings for Yuki and is jealous if another girl is about, but questions her sexual orientation when her childhood friend Futaba kisses her, later Futaba asked she if Yuki likes her, but at the beginning she reject it and finally admitted it and fight for him with the others girls.
Patricia Bepouin (弁法院 パトリシア, Bepouin Patricia)
Patricia is the student council president of Otorinashi Academy, and is in her third year of high school. She is half-American, this causes her to accidentally mix English into her words. She is strict and has a serious personality, initially thinking Yuuki is a troublemaker who assaults girls. However, she falls in love with him later in the series, and gets jealous when he hangs out with or compliments other girls.
Kotomi Shirakawa (白河 琴美, Shirakawa Kotomi)
The student council vice-president of Otorinashi Academy, Kotomi is in her third year of high school. She is cool and mischievous, and has an elusive personality, Kotomi will often make fun of Patricia. She is an otaku who likes cosplay, and is also a fan of yuri. Unlike the other girls in the series, Kotomi is flat-chested, and proud of it. She is childhood friends with Kagami and for who has great affection for Kagami. Her hobby is making dakimakura.

=== Supporting ===
Futaba Sou (双葉だから, Sou Futaba)
Futaba is introduced as a finalist who competes against Yuuki to succeed Patricia as student council president. Although she appears to be kind and meek, which Yuuki describes as giving "a yamato nadeshiko feel about her", she soon is revealed to be as nutty as the other girls, turning into a "kissing machine" (kisses everyone she sees) when aroused. She is childhood friends with Risa, Risa think that she likes girls, but she likes pretty things like Yuki and she want to have and take care of him.
Midori Kemigawa (綠檢見川, Kemigawa Midori)
Midori is a second-year student and the student council secretary. She is very happy and hyperactive, and is often seen with student council member Aoi Ougishima. Patricia senses that Midori is dangerous.
Aoi Ougishima (蒼井荻島, Ougishima Aoi)
Aoi is a student council member in her second year. She is very quiet and shy, and likes to read books. Midori and Aoi are often seen together.
Headmistress (校长, Headmistress)
The principal of Otorinashi Academy. She scolds Ayana and Yuuki, telling them if they cause trouble, Yuuki will be expelled whether or not he is a scholarship student, or in Ayana's case, fired. She later assigns student council president Patricia Bepoujin to keep a watch over Yuuki.
Katou-Sensei (北约老师, Sensei-Katō)
A happy-go-lucky teacher who works at Otorinashi Academy.

== Media ==
=== Manga ===
See Me After Class's original story was written by Akiyoshi Ohta, with drawings by Japanese manga artist Munyū, who is known for illustrating the Ladies versus Butlers! light novels. It was serialized in Media Factory's seinen manga magazine Monthly Comic Alive, from the August 2008 to January 2016 issues. The chapters have been collected into four tankōbon volumes, published between February 28, 2010, and March 23, 2016. These were released under Media Factory's MF Comics Alive Series imprint.

The release of the eleventh chapter included a survey in which readers could vote for the character to be featured on a subsequent volume cover. A special edition of the third volume was released on June 23, 2012, containing an OVA episode.

North American publisher Digital Manga announced in April 2012 that it had licensed two new manga titles for an English release. Both were to be released in spring 2013. Three volumes were translated into English and published in North America between February 13, 2013, and April 11, 2017, under Digital Manga's Project-H imprint. The manga is also licensed in Taiwan, Hong Kong, Macau, Singapore, and Malaysia by Sharp Point Press. Sharp Point Press released three volumes in Chinese between May 28, 2012, and January 8, 2013.

==== Chapter list ====
No.	Original release date	Original ISBN	North American release date	North American ISBN
01	February 28, 2010	978-4-8401-3313-5	February 13, 2013	978-1-9341-2972-2
1. "We Just Have to Even it Out to Zero"; 2. "Please Spank Me"; 3. "I Will Make You Undress If You Say That"; 4. "Rampaging in the Bath is Prohibited, You Know"; 5. "Why is My Heart Pounding Because of a Guy?"; 6. "I've Still Got It!"; 7. "I Feel Like I'm Doing Something Wrong"; 8. "You're a Boy, You Should Be More Open!"
02	November 30, 2011	978-1-6245-9149-5	March 12, 2014	978-1-4215-2756-7
9. "Chapter 9"; 10. "I Didn't Know How Much Force to Use"; 11. "I'm Not Going to Get in That Mood!"; 12. "Is About a Brief Explanation!"; 13. "I Can Faintly Smell Yuuki's Scent!"; 14. "My Head Will Explode!"; 15. "This Outfit is Embarrassing..."; 15.1. "This Outfit is Embarrassing.."; 15.2. "This Outfit is Embarrassing.. Part 2"; 16. "You Beaast!"; 17. "Why Do I Have to Go Through This"; 18. "If That's the Case I'll Cooperate!"; 19. "In the End, It Became Like This..."; 19.5. "A Rainbow Till Morning"
03	June 23, 2012 (special edition); June 30, 2012 (regular edition)	978-4-8401-4432-2 (special edition); 978-4-8401-4480-3 (regular edition)	April 11, 2017	978-1-6245-9289-8
OVA Extra. "Ayana-sensei Is Overdoing It!"; 20. "It's Our Secret"; 21. "Staying Together Like This"; 22. "I'm Already On My Limit On a Lot of Things"; 23. "I'm Already On My Limit On a Lot of Things 2"; 24. "That's The Wrong Spot"; 24.5. "Please Just Teach Me in a Normal"; 24.9. "OVA Special Chapter"; 25. "Don't Bear It and Take it Off"
04	March 23, 2016	978-4-0406-8216-7	—	—
27. "Bring it on!"; 28. "This is nowhere near enough!"; 29. "This is nowhere near enough, part 2"; 30. "I'm Aroused...!"; 31. "I'm Aroused...! 2"; 32. "I'm Aroused...! 3"; 33. "It's all Futaba-Chan Fault!"; 34. "Feeling Fuzzy"; 35. "Feeling Fuzzy 2"; 36. "It's my lead from here on out part 1"; 37. "It's my lead from here on out part 3"; 38. "It's my lead from here on out part 3"; 39. "So That You Won't Mess Up At The Real Thing 1"; 40. "So that you won't mess up at the real thing 2"; 41. "So that you won't mess up at the real thing 3"; 42. "I want to kiss you 1"; 43. ""; 44 END. ""

=== Anime ===
It was announced on the manga's second volume wraparound jacket that an anime adaptation had been green-lit. An original video animation (OVA) episode was included in a special edition of the third volume. The OVA episode retells the story of the first four chapters of the manga. It was directed by Hiromitsu Kanazawa, who also wrote the screenplay, and produced by a Japanese animation studio called GoHands, which is known for working on anime such as Princess Lover! and K. Music is provided by Japanese pop rock band Funta.

On June 27, 2012, it was released as a Blu-ray. The Blu-ray release includes five-minutes of bonus extras, and an exclusive card. A soundtrack CD, and a new colored manga titled "Ayana-sensei Is Overdoing It!" (綾奈先生やりすぎです!, Ayana-sensei Yarisugi Desu!) was added to the first edition of the Blu-ray release. The soundtrack includes background music used in the anime, and the main theme song, which is "happy☆lucky", sung by Asami Shimoda, Azumi Asakura, and Suzuko Mimori, who voice Yuuki, Ayana, and Risa in the anime, respectively.

== Reception ==
According to Diamond Comics, the first North American release of See Me After Class ranked No. 45 out of 50 titles in the charts during February 2013. On eManga, a digital publishing site for manga and light novels, an editorial review by Einschewtoy called the first volume of See Me After Class "semi-clean fun", and "good for a hearty laugh". They noted that, "The plot can be a little hard to swallow, though the humor does make it easier." Lynzee Loveridge of Anime News Network, in reviewing the first two volumes, wrote that the manga "trots out a lot of tired tropes. There's the overplayed "oops I accidentally fell on you and touched your breast" shtick only a girl gets pantsed instead, a hapless hero who is routinely accosted by high[-]strung or overly forward girls." However, she wrote that the "character designs feed into the books' lighthearted silliness present throughout the volumes." G.B. Smith of The Fandom Post praised the "attractive character designs", and wrote, "For those looking for a mildly amusing ecchi comedy, this title could fulfill that need."

Carlos Ross of THEM Anime Reviews generally panned the OVA adaptation, giving it 1 out of 5 stars, and calling it: "Poorly written, poorly conceived, and clearly intended for chauvinistic young men who want to see women abase themselves and act like bimbo porn stars, without springing for the actual pornography." Despite Ross saying, "There's one or two throw-away moments that elicit genuine chuckles", he criticized the OVA for "not actually understanding or knowing how actual women behave in the real world".

See Me After Class has been referred to as borderline hentai or of the such by critics. Loveridge wrote, "Since it is technically not an adult title, both volumes are an exercise in what the creators could get printed without the manga getting pulled from the magazine." Smith considered the content to be tame, commenting, "For an 18+ manga, this is all actually very light on the sexually explicit material. There is a lot of ecchi material and constant nudity, which earns it the higher rating, but this volume had no sex whatsoever." On the contrary, Ross showed distaste towards the OVA's fanservice at his review on THEM Anime Reviews. He wrote: "While not strictly hentai, this promo OVA skirts the line -- a female teacher strips naked in front of a male student and has sex with a female student, all onscreen, though any contact below the belt is heavily implied rather than shown."
