= Hand Shakers =

Japanese anime television series

- Promotional image

ハンドシェイカー (Hando Sheikā)
- Genre: Action, science fiction
- Created by: GoHands; Frontier Works; KADOKAWA
- Anime television series
- Directed by: Shingo Suzuki; Hiromitsu Kanazawa
- Produced by: Kazuhiko Hasegawa; Sachi Kawamoto; Kozue Kaneniwa; Mitsuhiro Ogata; Yūki Kurosaki; Toshiyasu Hayashi
- Written by: Hiromitsu Kanazawa
- Music by: GOON TRAX
- Studio: GoHands
- Licensed by: NA: Crunchyroll Funimation; SA/SEA: Muse Communication
- Original network: Tokyo MX, MBS, TVA, BS11
- English network: SEA: Animax Asia
- Original run: January 10, 2017 – March 28, 2017
- Episodes: 12 + OVA
- icon

Hand Shakers (ハンドシェイカー, Hando Sheikā) is a Japanese action anime television series produced by GoHands with collaboration of production company Frontier Works and publisher Kadokawa. It aired from January 10 (Note: It aired at 24:30 which is after midnight, so technically it was January 11.) to March 28, 2017.

Reception towards the anime was largely negative, with criticism being directed at its overall quality. While the animation was noted for its complexity and fluidity, many critics felt that the overall saturated visuals and unorthodox camera angles made it hard to enjoy, as it can cause serious health issues for some viewers with epilepsy.

A sequel named W'z, which is set a decade after the events of Hand Shakers, premiered on January 5, 2019.

== Plot ==
Hand Shakers takes place in Osaka in "AD20XX". The story revolves around Tazuna Takatsuki, a high-school student with a knack for mechanics, who accepts a certain repair request and visits a university research facility. There, he meets Koyori Akutagawa, a lone girl asleep on a bed. As though being led by something, Tazuna touches her fingertips—and a voice flows into him from a place unknown. Tazuna is left bewildered as a new world, Ziggurat, lies before him. Now together as Hand Shakers, the duo must fight to earn the right to confront God, where they will be able to make a wish. With "Nimrods", powers born from one's psyche after holding hands, the many groups of Hand Shakers must battle to defeat God.

== Characters ==
=== Hand Shakers ===
==== Team Gear ====
Tazuna (タヅナ) / Tazuna Takatsuki (高槻 手綱, Takatsuki Tazuna)
Voiced by: Sōma Saitō (Japanese); Justin Briner (English)
A kind high-school student who is especially good at mechanics and is always running around doing repairs for other people. He is more focused than the average person, but worries about the fact that this makes him unaware of his surroundings. He became a Hand Shaker after holding hands with Koyori while she was sleeping in a laboratory. Koyori, who will die if he lets go of her hand, reminds him of his younger sister who died. This motivates him to protect her as Koyori does not have a Nimrod to fight by herself. Chizuru later gives him the code name of "Single Gear". In W'z, Tazuna currently travels around the world in order to look for clues about the whereabouts of Koyori's twin, Mayumi, and her partner, Nagaoka.
Koyori (コヨリ) / Koyori Akutagawa (芥川小代理, Akutagawa Koyori)
Voiced by: Sumire Morohoshi (Japanese); Lara Woodhull (English)
A white-haired girl who is Tazuna's partner. Before meeting him, she had been put to sleep to conserve her life force, but after having her hand held by Tazuna she woke up and they became Hand Shaker partners. She reminds Tazuna of his younger sister and even though she is expressionless and does not speak, she is extremely compassionate and cares very deeply about Tazuna. Koyori receives the code name "Sprocket Gear" from Hibiki after successfully activating her Nimrod. The 13th episode reveals that she only survived her coma because Musubu, Tazuna's younger sister, had previously authorized the donation of her organs before her death. In W'z, Koyori works as a researcher at Kita Asuka Academy. She hoped to find her older twin sister, Mayumi, together with her partner, Nagaoka. Unfortunately, she was no longer able to use her Nimrods.

==== Team Card ====
Lily (リリ) / Riri Hojo (北条璃々, Hōjō Riri)
Voiced by: Ai Kayano (Japanese); Natalie Hoover (English)
The student council president at Tazuna's school and a highly respected honor student. She often asks Tazuna for help with repairs and is secretly a Hand Shaker, with her own younger brother as her partner. She has a talent for tarot card reading and, using this skill, she often advises those around her. Due to her parents' constant quarrels, Riri turns overprotective towards her younger brother. She also loves him dearly. By meeting 'God', Riri hopes to live in a world where both her and Masaru will be able to live together in peace. After being defeated by Tazuna & Koyori, Riri returns home and was informed of the news of her parents' divorce. In W'z, Riri is a fine grown woman. Since Masaru was adopted, He and Lily have since become married.
Masaru (マサル) / Masaru Hojo (北条 勝, Hōjō Masaru)
Voiced by: Ayumu Murase (Japanese); Trina Nishimura (English)
A mature and calm twelve-year-old boy with a talent for card games. Although he is younger, he always tries to look after his older sister. He is also known to be the number one card player in the district. Due to his parents' constant quarrels, Masaru was often scolded by his mother. He also performed poorly at school making his father to not pay attention to him. He worries about Riri's condition as she was being overprotective of him, willing to take the blame of his mistakes from their mother. After being defeated by Tazuna & Koyori, Masaru returns home and was informed by the news of his parents' divorce. In W'z, Masaru is a grown man. He is Reijiro's acquaintance. He approached Yukiya and tells him to meet with Dr. Akutagawa from Kita Asuka Academy. Masaru still keeps his close relationship with his older sister, Riri.

==== Team Shadow ====
Chizuru (チヅル) / Chizuru Mitsudera (三津寺千鶴, Mitsudera Chizuru)
Voiced by: Sumire Uesaka (Japanese); Sarah Wiedenheft (English)
A short and cheerful young woman who is the boss of a company called Centeolt. Despite her looks, she is a very capable and hardworking boss. She often makes witty comebacks to her subordinate, Hayate. She is defeated by Team Gear and offers to guide them around the world of Ziggurat. In W'z, Chizuru and Hayate managed a quiescent café together.
Hayate (ハヤテ) / Hayate Azuma (東 颯, Azuma Hayate)
Voiced by: Kaito Ishikawa (Japanese); Aaron Roberts (English)
Chizuru's subordinate and a new employee. While tall and erect, he is extremely easygoing and always apologises. Due to his height, he is often mistaken to be Chizuru's boss, which annoys her to no end. He is defeated by Team Gear and goes with Chizuru's idea of guiding Koyori and Tazuna around the world of Ziggurat. In W'z, Hayate managed a quiescent café together with his former boss, Chizuru.

==== Team Sword ====
Kodama (コタマ) / Kodama Awaza (阿波座こだま, Awaza Kodama)
Voiced by: Mikako Komatsu (Japanese); Bryn Apprill (English)
An idol recognised by her use of proverbs and prominent pigtails. Cheerful and self-assured, she is very confident in her abilities and partners with Hibiki. Despite her full confidence, Kodama is an unsuccessful idol. She was under-promoted by her agency making her obscure by the public. Her only wish is to be a successful idol who was adored by her fans. After being defeated by Tazuna & Koyori, Kodama felt dejected and almost on the verge of giving up her dreams as an idol. Hibiki managed to encourage her and lift her spirits to try once again. Determined, Kodama once again raise and took baby-steps to be a successful & well-known idol. In W'z, Kodama is a Proprietress. Due to her schedule, she was unable to attend the Hand Shakers gathering that Masaru planned.
Hibiki (ヒビキ) / Hibiki Moriyama (盛山 響, Moriyama Hibiki)
Voiced by: Tomokazu Sugita (Japanese); Sonny Strait (English)
A Hand Shaker that fights alongside Kodama. He was a businessman until he left his job in order to support Kodama, and now works as her manager. He is always deeply moved by everything Kodama says or does and is quick to compliment her. His enthusiasm and fondness of Kodama was due to her obscurity. Hibiki quits his former job to be Kodama's manager. He is committed with his management work, aiming to grant Kodama's wishes to be a famous idol. After being defeated by Tazuna & Koyori, Hibiki encouraged Kodama to take another chance as an idol, which in turn lifts up Kodama's spirits. He gave Koyori the code name, "Sprocket Gear" after she activated her Nimrod. In W'z, Hibiki is a busy Tailor who works with Kodama. Due to their schedule, he was unable to attend the Hand Shakers gathering.

==== Team Cocoon ====
Nagaoka (ナガオカ) / Daichi Nagaoka (長岡大地, Nagaoka Daichi)
Voiced by: Kenjiro Tsuda
Nagaoka is old associate and the former Hand Shakers partner of Makihara. Together with Makihara, he works under the Akutagawa's in order to understand the nature of the Babel lore & Ziggurat. After the birth of the Akutagawa sisters, Nagaoka & Makihara become their caretakers, having to constantly activate their Nimrods to protect the twins from other Hand Shakers. After the disappearance of Mr. & Mrs. Akutagawa, and the sudden insensated condition of the twins, Nagaoka aims to continue on the Akutagawa's research to end the suffering of the twin sisters. He took Mayumi away and drugged her to keep her alive. After being defeated by Tazuna & Koyori, Mayumi reveals that Nagaoka was physically suffering from health issues and the reason he was acting so brash was due to his goal of reaching 'God' before his sickness took over him. Despite taking a shrewd measure to keep her alive, Nagaoka actually cares for Mayumi. His code name is "Golden Cocoon". In W'z, Nagaoka and Mayumi, together with Tazuna and Koyori managed to reach 'God'. After that very meeting, both Nagaoka & Mayumi's whereabouts were unknown.
Mayumi (マユミ) / Mayumi Akutagawa (芥川 檀, Akutagawa Mayumi)
Voiced by: Ai Kakuma
Mayumi is Koyori's older twin sister and former Hand Shakers partner, as well as Nagaoka's partner. Together with Koyori, she was born inside of the Ziggurat dimension, thus was considered special. This however, attracts the attention of other groups of Hand Shakers with ill intentions. After the betrayal of Shigure, a dejected Mayumi wished that she and her sister won't need to fight anymore. She and Koyori suddenly go into comas after the disappearance of their parents. Nagaoka then took her and keeps her alive by using a questionable method. In spite of this, Mayumi was thankful with Nagaoka for his attempts, understanding his urgency to continue her parents' legacy. After their defeat, Mayumi stays with Nagaoka and tries to help him with his goals. Her code name is "Silver Cocoon". In W'z, Mayumi & Nagaoka, altogether with Tazuna & Koyori managed to reach 'God'. After the very meeting, both Mayumi & Nagaoka went missing.

==== Team Chain ====
Break (ブレイク, Bureiku)
Voiced by: Jun Fukuyama (Japanese); Alejandro Saab (English)
A ruthless Hand Shaker who is Bind's partner. He accesses Bind's chain-making ability by torturing her. After being defeated by Tazuna and Koyori, he and Bind begin to mend their relationship. In W'z, Break, also known as Reijiro, becomes the adoptive parents of the series' protagonist. He is now married with his partner Bind.
Bind (バインド, Baindo)
Voiced by: Yoko Hikasa (Japanese); Monica Rial (English)
A young woman that fights alongside Break. Despite being cruelly treated, she is very dependent on Break and cares for him and even states that she will do anything for him. After being defeated by Tazuna and Koyori, she and Break begin to mend their relationship. In W'z, Bind, also known as Yukine, is the adoptive mother of the series' protagonist. She is now married with her partner Break.

=== Others ===
Makihara (マキハラ) / Nagamasa Makihara (槇原長政, Makihara Nagamasa)
Voiced by: Showtaro Morikubo (Japanese); Anthony Bowling (English)
A professor at a university who actually researching the truth behind Hand Shakers. To put Koyori on safety, he has been putting her on sleep before meeting Tazuna.
Musubu (ムスブ) / Musubu Takatsuki (高槻 結, Takatsuki Musubu)
Voiced by: Sora Amamiya (Japanese); Jad Saxton (English)
Tazuna's deceased younger sister who died from an illness. Before her death, she allowed the donation of her organs, leading to Koyori and Mayumi's miraculous survival.
Tazuna's father (タヅナの父, Tazuna no chichi)
Voiced by: Shintaro Asanuma (Japanese); Chuck Huber (English)
Tazuna's father.
Tazuna's mother (タヅナの母, Tazuna no haha)
Voiced by: Satomi Satō (Japanese); Tia Ballard (English)
Tazuna's mother. Often seen being lovey dovey with her husband.
Tomoki (トモキ) / Tomoki Tachibana (橘 友樹, Tachibana Tomoki)
Voiced by: Yūsuke Kobayashi (Japanese); Derick Snow (English)
Shigure (シグレ) / Shigure Hanasaki (花咲時雨, Hanasaki Shigure)
Voiced by: Saori Hayami (Japanese); Alexis Tipton (English)
Makihira and Nagaoka's junior researcher who used to work with them in researching Hand Shakers. She is later revealed to be working alongside another Hand Shaker called Koichi in order to defeat their rivals, betraying Makihara and Nagaoka. However, Makihara and Nagaoka defeat them and force them to flee.
Voice of "god" (神の声, Kami no koe)
Voiced by: Daisuke Namikawa (Japanese); Chris Rager (English)
Dr. Akutagawa (芥川博士, Akutagawa hakase)
Voiced by: Kentarō Tone (Japanese); J. Michael Tatum (English)
Mayumi and Koyori's Father.
Dr. Akutagawa's Wife (芥川博士妻, Akutagawa hakase tsuma)
Voiced by: Emiri Katō (Japanese); Mikaela Krantz (English)
Mayumi and Koyori's Mother.
Koichi
Voiced by: Noriaki Sugiyama
A Hand Shaker who helps Shigure in ambushing and betraying other Hand Shakers. After being defeated, he is forced to flee.

== Media ==
=== Anime ===
The project was announced in March 2016, but the project site was relaunched in July 2016. Kadokawa and GOON TRAX produced the music for the anime. The opening theme song, titled "One Hand Message", is performed by OxT, while the ending theme, titled "Yume Miru Ame", is performed by Akino Arai. The anime was celebrating the 30th anniversary of the Animate chain of anime character goods stores. The anime ran for 12 episodes. An unaired episode was released on July 26, 2017, titled Hand Shakers EX. Crunchyroll has licensed the series in North America. Muse Communication licensed the series in Southeast Asia and South Asia, and aired it on Animax Asia and later on its own Muse Asia YouTube channel.

No. in season	Title	Directed by	Original release date
1	"Conductor to Contact"	Katsumasa Yokomine	January 10, 2017
High school student Tazuna Takatsuki is a kind young fellow who is in love with mechanics, stopping anytime to help anyone fix anything problems that have to do with mechanics, and he is almost always successful. When he goes to a university to meet a scientist named Nagamasa Makihara who has requested his help in fixing something, only to come across a hospital room where a young girl with short white hair is lying unconscious on a bed. Reminded strongly of his deceased sister, Tazuna approaches the girl, only for her to wake up and reach for his hand. The moment their hands make contact, both of them are transported to an alternate reality, where Tazuna collapses, only to wake up to find himself back in the room, with the girl awake and Makihara dancing with glee. Makihara barely explains the details clearly, only bluntly stating that Tazuna cannot let go of the girl, Koyori Akutagawa's hand or else she will die. When Tazuna looks up however, Makihara is gone, and the duo are attacked by metal chains snaking through the walls. The two escape, only to be confronted by a rebellious-looking man that controls the chains, along with a young woman treated like a puppy dog. The man roughly introduces himself as Break and the girl Bind, but makes one point clear: he has come to kill them. Tazuna and Koyori runs, but the chains are everywhere. It seems the two are doomed, when metallic gears materialize suddenly, forming a protective barrier around Koyori and Tazuna before taking the form of a sword. Together, Tazuna and Koyori stab Break as Bind reaches her limit, and wins the battle.
2	"Lead by Red"	Katsumasa Yokomine	January 17, 2017
Makihara finally settles down sufficiently to explain that Koyori and Tazuna are now a group of Hand Shakers, two people that combine abilities to challenge God through holding hands, thus the name Hand Shakers. This act also enables them to stay in the twisted reality of Ziggurat, where other Hand Shakers battle with one another and is also the very core of their Nimrod, or power. Makihara is researching the various reasons of Hand Shakers' existence, and originally planned to keep Koyori asleep before she found her partner, lest her life force be drained. However now, with Tazuna, Koyori can live on, and Makihara takes the both of them to Tazuna's house, lying that Koyori will be staying with them as she is on an exchange program in Tazuna's school. With the price of constantly holding hands, this results in embarrassing moments in the bathroom, and many rumours spreading around school that the duo are a couple. Meanwhile, three business partners bid goodbye after a meeting, one of them being a tiny young girl that is believed to be a middle school student who is an intern, but it turns out she is the boss of a certain company known as Centeolt, with the name of Chizuru Mitsudera, accompanied by her subordinate, a tall lanky man named Hayate Azuma.
3	"Blade and Dagger"	Tetsuichi Yamagishi	January 24, 2017
Makihara gives Koyori a check-up, and informs Tazuna that he can let go of her hand for a maximum of fifteen minutes now, and can also eat real food. While out for lunch, Chizuru and Hayate spot Koyori and Tazuna working together in the kitchen to make the appliances more effective, and Hayate takes this chance to thank Tazuna for helping to fix his car previously. Mistaking them to be a couple, Chizuru offers to take them to the restaurant run by their company for a date. The "couple" goes, and after a wonderful time, Chizuru and Hayate reveal themselves to be Hand Shakers. Fighting ensues, but Tazuna's gears prove to be ineffective against Chizuru's circular blades, known as Dagger Blades, and Hayate's sword, known as Blade Shadow. With double Nimrods and shadow clones, this pair of Hand Shakers prove to be more than a match for Tazuna and Koyori, who has no way to fight.
4	"Live Lab"	Hiromitsu Kanazawa	January 31, 2017
Tazuna lures Hayate and Chizuru to the rooftop of a temple, where their shadow clones are ineffective and Tazuna successfully traps Chizuru and injures Hayate. Winning the battle, the two groups of Hand Shakers return to Makihara's lab, where they caution Tazuna about constantly holding hands with Koyori and revealing their identity. They also explain clearly how they are transported to Ziggurat, either within a kilometre range of one another or by targeting other groups. Despite suffering bitter defeat, the duo offer to be Tazuna and Koyori's guides around the world of Ziggurat.
5	"Meet Yet"	Masayuki Tachibana	February 7, 2017
During a trip around the city, Koyori and Tazuna get separated, and Tazuna goes around the whole city searching for her, fearing she will die. Koyori is confronted by the friendly Riri "Lily" Hojo, the student council president of Tazuna's school. She kindly takes Koyori with her to a card tournament, where she calls Tazuna but he does not pick up. Koyori spends the rest of the afternoon with Lily and her younger brother, Masaru, a mature young boy who is also a card game champion. The siblings play a few card games with her to pass the time, while Lily makes frequent attempts to call Tazuna. Meanwhile, he meets an odd man outside Makihara's lab, who knows a lot about Hand Shakers and Makihara. Frightened, Tazuna leaves hastily, and finally picks up Lily's call. Koyori and Tazuna finally reunite, but when Lily holds Masaru's hand, the world shifts to that of Ziggurat, and the siblings reveal their true identities as Hand Shakers and their Nimrods: two decks of shuffling cards, one pink and the other blue.
6	"Emperor of Fortune"	Katsumasa Yokomine	February 14, 2017
The two pairs of Hand Shakers summon their Nimrods, and Lily and Masaru then disappear into thin air. This is followed by a barrage of attacks from nowhere, which Koyori recognises comes from the attack cards in the much-loved card game "Precious Memories", the game Masaru excels most at. Unable to pinpoint the attacks, Tazuna and Koyori are at a losing end as they dodge attacks barely to make their way to Lily and Masaru, who have reappeared on a skyscraper. Due to Koyori's experience with Masaru's playing, she manages to predict his attacks while Tazuna defends them with his sword, and the duo get closer. Running out of cards, Masaru bades Lily give him her retrot cards, and he converges it into one final attack, but to no avail. Despite Tazuna's injuries, Lily and Masaru are defeated.
7	"Festival and Carnival"	Tetsuichi Yamagishi	February 21, 2017
Tazuna returns to Makihara's lab, and questions him about his identity, to which Makihara reveals the truth that he was once a Hand Shaker. With much on his mind about it, Tazuna is further forced to help with the school's festival, where Tazuna's class is setting up a booth with free snacks. Asked to approach Lily, Tazuna apologises for the incident, to which Lily bats it away, and casually offers help, but turns out is unable to. Tazuna then asks Chizuru and Hayate for help, to which Chizuru makes Koyori wear a kimono to advertise their company. Problem solved with getting ingredients, Koyori then reveals her interest in cooking and offers to help out with the booth. After a busy two days of working, Koyori prepares a special meal for Tazuna.
8	"Sing a Sonic"	Masayuki Tachibana	February 28, 2017
While shopping, Tazuna and Koyori get thrown into another Hand Shaker battle. This time, they are up against Kodama Awaza, a popular idol famed for her singing and widely recognisable through her prominent pigtails and use of proverbs. Accompanying her as her partner is her portly manager Hibiki Moriyama. As they begin to duel, Kodama gains the upper hand as her Nimrod begins to affect the world of Ziggurat directly, forcing Tazuna and Koyori to retreat as Kodama prepares to deal the final blow. In the process of escaping, Tazuna is gravely injured and brought back to Makihara's lab for recuperation and recovery. When he is finally discharged, Koyori reveals her worries of being her burden to him due to her absence of a Nimrod to Lily while crying bitterly over Tazuna.
9	"Finally Fairy"	Katsumasa Yokomine	March 7, 2017
Tazuna's condition worsens as he soon gets a high fever. In his present condition, Makihara then forbids Tazuna from leaving the house to fight. However, Tazuna storms out at the protests of his parents and takes Koyori along. Drawing Kodama and Hibiki into the Ziggurat, they once again begin to duel. Within minutes, Tazuna is at his limit. Dealing the last blow, Kodama delivers a favourite quote of hers: True strength comes from an unbreakable will. These words spark Koyori's wish to protect Tazuna as much as he had protected her, resulting in an unexpected transformation. Changing into a white-clad fairy, Koyori successfully earns her Nimrod as well as her power of speech. With both pairs of Hand Shakers on even ground, Koyori uses her keen observation skills to predict Kodama's movements just as she had done with Masaru's cards and the two win to Kodama's utmost despair.
10	"Kitten Kitchen"	Hiromitsu Kanazawa	March 14, 2017
Koyori and Tazuna are hired by Chizuru at one of Cocktail Corn's premises. During work hours, Hayate reveals his true feelings about his boss to Tazuna and Koyori, causing Chizuru to misunderstand that he loves her. At their break, Koyori and Tazuna also come across Lily and Masaru, who enlists Tazuna's help in taking care of his older sister while volunteering to teach Tazuna how to play "Precious Memories". While shopping, the two come across Kodama making a live concert on a makeshift stage. Approached by Hibiki who formally reintroduces himself, he promises that there are no hard feelings between them. Satisfied after a great day, they bump into Makihara. After being thoroughly overjoyed at Koyori's newfound ability to speak, his joy is short-lived however as they are soon approached by the menacing man Tazuna had met previously on his quest to find Koyori. Emerging with him is another girl with an uncanny resemblance to Koyori holding his hand, as Makihara grows grim with understanding.
11	"Cocoon Cocoon"	Masayuki Tachibana	March 21, 2017
The menacing man introduces himself as Daichi Nagaoka, an old associate and former Hand Shaker partner of Makihara. He also introduces the white-haired girl beside him as Mayumi Akutagawa, who is none other than Koyori's twin sister. Koyori's sinister past is revealed through a flashback concerning both Makihara and Nagaoka, as well as the Akutagawa professors. Like Makihara and Nagaoka, the Akutagawa professors are Hand Shaker partners and scientists striving to discover the mystery behind Hand Shakers' existence. To help in their research, they draw one another into the Ziggurat (the two parties being two pairs of Hand Shakers) and there, Mrs Akutagawa gives birth to two white-haired twin girls: Mayumi and Koyori. Being born in the Ziggurat, the twins are naturally gifted Hand Shaker powers and become partners. While the Akutagawas are ecstatic with the success of their project, this soon proves to be a curse as the twins, being children, are easy targets. This also results in them unable to lose or let go of each other hands lest they die. The Akutagawas, filled with regret, slowly but surely get infatuated with the possibly of meeting God and killing him to protect their daughters and end this battle. It is also at this time when Makihara and Nagaoka stop being Hand Shakers as their relationship worsens and they lose their will to fight together. True to their word, the Akutagawa professors depart to kill God, but have never returned. Then Koyori and Mayumi abruptly lose all their memories, powers of speech and movement, and fall into a coma. Wishing to fulfil the Akutagawas' dream, Nagaoka kidnaps Mayumi and puts her on drugs, turning her into his Hand Shaker partner and leaving Koyori and Makihara for good. Returning to the present, Tazuna, Koyori, Mayumi and Nagaoka are drawn into the Ziggurat as they prepare to do battle.
12	"Shake the Hands"	Tetsuichi Yamagishi	March 28, 2017
Nagaoka reveals that he had planned their battle by sending the Houjo siblings and Kodama to fight him, trying to intimidate Tazuna and Koyori. Undeterred, Tazuna summons their gears and Koyori turns into a fairy; Nagaoka changes into a flowery coat along with Mayumi. The battle ensues, and Mayumi conjures brightly-coloured cocoons that rebound around physical objects, turning anything it touches into a flowery patch of ground. Nagaoka then causes the area to explode. At first, Koyori and Tazuna try to fall back, but are caught in the explosions as many cocoons rush after them. As they flee, Tazuna asks Koyori if she feels alright fighting her older sister, to which Koyori explains that she is able to connect to everyone she comes into contact with, which means she can also do the same with Mayumi. Emotionless like the old Koyori, Mayumi attacks everything in sight as they face off with Nagaoka. A formidable opponent, he can destroy their gears and Tazuna and Koyori are at a losing end. Tazuna then realises that Mayumi cannot fight without destroying her Nimrod, and if she pushes herself too much she will disappear and die. Nagaoka does not relent, and they use Mayumi's exhaustion as an opening to attack him repeatedly. Luring him up to a skyscraper unwisely, Mayumi places all her cocoons under it and set off dozens of explosions. In a desperate attempt, Tazuna and Koyori link hands and fight as one, defeating Nagaoka. The battle is not over yet as Mayumi persists, and is revealed to be able to speak, her first words being that she will protect Nagaoka even is it means her disappearance. At that, Koyori connects with Mayumi, her former partner, and stops the disappearance. Returning to the real world, Nagaoka makes amends with Makihara. Mayumi explains her emotions occurred when she bonded with Nagaoka and like Koyori, she can connect with the people she comes into contact with. Complimenting Tazuna, Nagaoka leaves with Mayumi, who wants to eat a parfait with him. Koyori and Tazuna are drawn into another Hand Shaker battle, this time, brimming with confidence. An odd blonde-haired man is also revealed to be their next opponent, but his partner is missing.
OVA	"Go ago Go"	Katsumasa Yokomine	July 26, 2017
A prequel that takes place 4 years before Tazuna and Koyori meet.

== Reception ==
The anime was widely panned by critics and audiences, who found its visual aesthetic unappealing and overstimulating. Reviewing the first two episodes, James Becket of Anime News Network described the series as "mystifying, maddening, and bizarre.", noting is motion sickness-inducing art direction and bland, uninspired writing.
