= The Masterful Cat Is Depressed Again Today =

Japanese manga series

- First volume cover

デキる猫は今日も憂鬱 (Dekiru Neko wa Kyō mo Yūutsu)
- Genre: Comedy, slice of life
- Manga
- Written by: Hitsuzi Yamada
- Published by: Kodansha
- English publisher: NA: Seven Seas Entertainment
- Magazine: Suiyōbi no Sirius; Monthly Shōnen Sirius (2021–present)
- Original run: August 22, 2018 – present
- Volumes: 13
- Anime television series
- Directed by: Susumu Kudo (Note: Credited as Chief Director (総監督, Sō Kantoku)); Katsumasa Yokomine
- Produced by: Kazuhiko Hasegawa; Satoshi Fukao; Hiroshi Kamei; Fumiki Yamazaki; Masahide Tsuji
- Written by: GoHands (Note: Series composition (シリーズ構成)); Tamazo Yanagi (Note: Screenplay (脚本))
- Music by: Ryosuke Kojima
- Studio: GoHands
- Licensed by: Crunchyroll (streaming); SA/SEA: Medialink
- Original network: MBS, TBS, BS-TBS
- Original run: July 8, 2023 – September 30, 2023
- Episodes: 13
- icon

The Masterful Cat Is Depressed Again Today (Japanese: デキる猫は今日も憂鬱, Hepburn: Dekiru Neko wa Kyō mo Yūutsu) is a Japanese web manga series written and illustrated by Hitsuzi Yamada. It began serialization on Kodansha's Suiyōbi no Sirius online manga section on the Nico Nico Seiga website in August 2018, and is also published in Monthly Shōnen Sirius since October 2021. An anime television series adaptation produced by GoHands aired from July to September 2023.

== Plot ==
The young employee Saku lives alone with her cat Yukichi, a feline as big as it is special. Yukichi is in fact extraordinarily intelligent, doing his utmost to take care of the house and of his mistress, who on the contrary is far from conscientious and has a habit of neglecting herself and her house.

== Characters ==
Saku Fukuzawa (福澤 幸来, Fukuzawa Saku)
Voiced by: Yui Ishikawa
A young salarywoman working as a foreman is careless, ditzy, and neglects her self-care, with habits of compulsive hoarding and excessive drinking. Adopting the exceptional cat Yukichi markedly improves her life; his influence guides her toward a healthier lifestyle with less alcohol and better personal upkeep. Despite a lazy appearance, she is an excellent employee when motivated and is fiercely protective of loved ones, capable of single-handedly throwing an adult man to the ground.
Yukichi (諭吉)
Voiced by: Hiroki Yasumoto
An extraordinarily intelligent, human-sized black cat who lives with Saku. He walks bipedally, expertly uses tools, and learns new skills with ease, taking great pride in his masterful cooking. He manages all household duties while Saku works. Though he claims he bonded with her only to avoid starvation, he has grown genuinely fond of her, worrying about her health and offering daily support. Once a normal-sized stray kitten, he trained himself in housekeeping after witnessing Saku's filthy apartment, learning to cook by watching tutorials by his favorite band, UMYU-Sea.
Yuri Shibasaki (柴咲 ゆり, Shibasaki Yuri)
Voiced by: Ai Kakuma
Saku Fukuzawa and Oshiro's colleague and friend. Yuri is respectful of Saku; they became colleagues and friends after Saku rescued her from a pervert on a train they were riding on. She is also cousins with Rio Nishina, the young woman working at the shop where Yukichi buys groceries.
Oshiro (尾代)
Voiced by: Aoi Inase
Saku Fukuzawa and Yuri Shibasaki's colleague and friend. She is often asked by her colleagues to introduce them to Saku. Although Oshiro often goes to mixers to get a date, she remains single.
Kaoru Orizuka (織塚 馨, Orizuka Kaoru)
Voiced by: Katsuyuki Konishi
Saku Fukuzawa's boss. Despite appearing stoic and maintaining a professional relationship with his employees, Orizuka balances his duties with spending time with his family members, especially his niece, Yume.
Rio Nishina (仁科 理央, Nishina Rio)
Voiced by: M.A.O
Rio works at the grocery store where Yukichi is a regular customer. Like many others, she questions whether he is a human in a convincing costume. She develops a deep respect for Saku Fukuzawa after Saku rescues her and Yukichi from a toxic ex-boyfriend. Rio eventually learns the cat's true name but keeps this secret from her cat-obsessed manager. She is also cousins with Yuri Shibasaki, Saku's junior colleague.
Shop Manager (店⾧, Tenchō)
Voiced by: Miyu Irino
The manager of the local grocery store where Yukichi shops. Despite his position and Rio's complaints about Yukichi, the manager is obsessed with the cat, believing him to be a good luck charm for the store and always greets and thanks him enthusiastically.
Yume (優芽)
Voiced by: Ayana Taketatsu
Kaoru's four-year-old niece. She loves cats and like Yukichi, she is a big fan of Umyu-Sea. Yume is not bothered by Yukichi's size and considers him a friend. Yume is one of the few people who know Yukichi is a real cat and not an adult person in a costume.
Yume's Mother (優芽の母, Yume no Haha)
Voiced by: Yoko Hikasa
Kaoru's older sister and Yume's mother. Saku is shocked that her boss has an older sister who looks younger than him.
Yume's Grandmother (優芽の祖母, Yume no Sobo)
Voiced by: Tamie Kubota
Kaoru and his sister's mother, and Yume's maternal grandmother. She is blind and in a wheelchair, yet she enjoys spending time with her family; she and her late father consider black cats as good luck charms.
Saku's Mother (幸来の母, Saku no Haha)
Voiced by: Satomi Satō
A sharp-tongued woman who berates her daughter for being a slob, yet loves Yukichi, unaware of his current size.
Saku's Father (幸来の父, Saku no Chichi)
Voiced by: Jun Fukuyama
A man who loves Yukichi, unaware of his current size.
Mei (メイ)
Voiced by: Kotoe Taichi
An old woman who lives in the apartment next door to Saku and Yukichi. Just like Yume, Mei is aware that Yukichi is a giant cat, but is unbothered by his larger than normal size. Mei and Yukichi are on good terms, helping each other and even volunteering to clean the neighborhood park.

== Media ==
=== Manga ===
Written and illustrated by Hitsuzi Yamada, The Masterful Cat Is Depressed Again Today began serialization on Kodansha's Suiyōbi no Sirius online manga section on the Nico Nico Seiga website on August 22, 2018; it also started publication in Monthly Shōnen Sirius on October 26, 2021. Kodansha has collected its chapters into individual wideban volumes. The first volume was released on April 9, 2019. As of July 9, 2026, thirteen volumes have been released.

In North America, the manga is licensed for English release by Seven Seas Entertainment.

==== Volumes ====
No.	Original release date	Original ISBN	English release date	English ISBN
1	April 9, 2019	978-4-06-515173-0	September 28, 2021	978-1-64827-605-7
2	September 9, 2019	978-4-06-516903-2	November 23, 2021	978-1-64827-618-7
3	April 9, 2020	978-4-06-519050-0	February 22, 2022	978-1-63858-117-8
4	December 9, 2020	978-4-06-521586-9	May 24, 2022	978-1-63858-260-1
5	June 9, 2021	978-4-06-523514-0	December 20, 2022	978-1-63858-668-5
6	June 9, 2022	978-4-06-528097-3	June 13, 2023	978-1-63858-903-7
7	February 9, 2023	978-4-06-530568-3	January 16, 2024	979-8-88843-113-9
8	August 8, 2023	978-4-06-532528-5	September 24, 2024	979-8-89160-294-6
9	March 8, 2024	978-4-06-534788-1	March 25, 2025	979-8-89373-177-4
10	September 9, 2024	978-4-06-536740-7	September 23, 2025	979-8-89373-966-4
11	April 9, 2025	978-4-06-538973-7	March 31, 2026	979-8-89765-218-1
12	November 7, 2025	978-4-06-541346-3	September 29, 2026	979-8-89863-249-6
13	July 9, 2026	978-4-06-544153-4	—	—

=== Anime ===
In May 2022, it was announced that the series would be adapted into an anime television series. The series is produced by GoHands, who supervised the scripts written by Tamazo Yanagi, with Katsumasa Yokomine directing, Susumu Kudo serving as chief director, and Takayuki Uchida designing the characters. It aired from July 8 to September 30, 2023, on the Animeism programming block on MBS and other affiliates. (Note: MBS listed the series premiere on July 7, 2023, at 26:23, which is effectively July 8 at 2:23 a.m. JST.) The opening theme song is "Ureu Kado niwa Fuku Kitaru" (憂う門には福来たる; "Fortune Comes to a Worried House") by Somei. Crunchyroll is streaming the series.

Medialink licensed the series in South, Southeast Asia and Oceania (except Australia and New Zealand), streaming it on its Ani-One Asia's YouTube channel. Netflix added the series to its catalog in India in December 2023.

==== Episodes ====
No.	Title (Note: All English titles are taken from Crunchyroll.)	Directed by	Storyboarded by	Original release date
1	"The Masterful Cat Is Depressed Again Today"; Transliteration: "Dekiru Neko wa Kyō mo Yūutsu" (Japanese: デキる猫は今日も憂鬱)	Shingo Suzuki, Katsumasa Yokomine	Shingo Suzuki, Katsuyuki Kodera	July 8, 2023
2	"The Masterful Cat Has Grown Big"; Transliteration: "Dekiru Neko wa Ōkiku Sodatta" (Japanese: デキる猫は大きく育った)	Masayuki Tachibana, Shōhei Adachi	Katsuyuki Kodera, Katsumasa Yokomine	July 15, 2023
3	"A Masterful Cat Is Good at Giving Care"; Transliteration: "Dekiru Neko wa Osewa ga Dekiru" (Japanese: デキる猫はお世話がデキる)	Masayuki Tachibana, Shōhei Adachi	Katsuyuki Kodera	July 22, 2023
4	"A Masterful Cat Goes to the Aquarium"; Transliteration: "Dekiru Neko wa Suizokukan ni Iku" (Japanese: デキる猫は水族館に行く)	Tetsuichi Yamagishi	Katsuyuki Kodera, Katsumasa Yokomine	July 29, 2023
5	"A Masterful Cat Also Goes to Birthday Parties"; Transliteration: "Dekiru Neko wa Otanjōkai ni mo Iku" (Japanese: デキる猫はお誕生会にも行く)	Tetsuichi Yamagishi	Katsuyuki Kodera, Katsumasa Yokomine	August 5, 2023
6	"A Masterful Cat Is Photogenic"; Transliteration: "Dekiru Neko wa Shashin Utsuri ga Ii" (Japanese: デキる猫は写真映りがいい)	Shōhei Adachi, Masayuki Tachibana	Katsuyuki Kodera, Katsumasa Yokomine	August 12, 2023
7	"A Masterful Cat Is Able to DIY"; Transliteration: "Dekiru Neko wa Dī Ai Wai mo Dekiru" (Japanese: デキる猫はDIYもデキる)	Shōhei Adachi, Masayuki Tachibana	Katsuyuki Kodera, Katsumasa Yokomine	August 19, 2023
8	"A Masterful Cat Has a Lot of Worries"; Transliteration: "Dekiru Neko wa Shinpai ga Ōi" (Japanese: デキる猫は心配が多い)	Katsumasa Yokomine	Katsuyuki Kodera, Shingo Suzuki, Katsumasa Yokomine	August 31, 2023
9	"A Masterful Cat Is Popular"; Transliteration: "Dekiru Neko wa Natsukareru" (Japanese: デキる猫は懐かれる)	Katsumasa Yokomine	Katsuyuki Kodera, Katsumasa Yokomine	September 2, 2023
10	"A Masterful Cat Can Watch the House?"; Transliteration: "Dekiru Neko wa Rusuban ga Dekiru?" (Japanese: デキる猫は留守番がデキる？)	Tetsuichi Yamagishi	Katsuyuki Kodera, Katsumasa Yokomine	September 9, 2023
11	"A Masterful Cat Also Cares About Health"; Transliteration: "Dekiru Neko wa Kenkō ni Ki o Tsukau" (Japanese: デキる猫は健康に気をつかう)	Tetsuichi Yamagishi	Katsuyuki Kodera, Katsumasa Yokomine	September 16, 2023
12	"The Masterful Cat Runs Away from Home?"; Transliteration: "Dekiru Neko wa Ie o Deteiku?" (Japanese: デキる猫は家を出て行く？)	Shōhei Adachi	Katsuyuki Kodera, Katsumasa Yokomine	September 23, 2023
13	"The Masterful Cat Is Depressed Tomorrow As Well"; Transliteration: "Dekiru Neko wa Ashita mo Yūutsu" (Japanese: デキる猫は明日も憂鬱)	Shōhei Adachi	Katsuyuki Kodera, Katsumasa Yokomine	September 30, 2023

== Reception ==
The series ranked eleventh on "Nationwide Bookstore Employees' Recommended Comics of 2020" by the Honya Club online bookstore. The series was also ranked eighteenth in the 2020 Next Manga Award in the web category.
