= K: Missing Kings =

- Japanese theatrical release poster
- Directed by: Shingo Suzuki
- Written by: GoRA
- Based on: K by GoHands
- Starring: Daisuke Namikawa; Daisuke Ono; Kenjiro Tsuda; Mikako Komatsu; Tomokazu Sugita
- Music by: Mikio Endō
- Production company: GoHands
- Distributed by: Movic
- Release date: July 12, 2014
- Running time: 73 minutes
- Country: Japan
- Language: Japanese
- Box office: $826,323

K: Missing Kings is a 2014 Japanese animated film based on the K anime series. The movie takes place one year after the anime in the summer. The movie was released on July 12, 2014.

== Plot ==
On October 13, about a year after the "Academy Island Incident" between four of the seven Kings, Silver Clansmen Kuroh Yatogami and Neko have been searching for their master, Yashiro Isana. Without finding any clues to his whereabouts, the two became disheartened. However, one day, they see HOMRA members Rikio Kamamoto and Anna Kushina being chased by someone.

== Cast ==
Character	Japanese	English
Yashiro Isana	Daisuke Namikawa	Sam Regal
Kuroh Yatogami	Daisuke Ono	Matthew Mercer
Mikoto Suoh	Kenjiro Tsuda	Keith Silverstein
Neko	Mikako Komatsu	Stephanie Sheh
Reisi Munakata	Tomokazu Sugita	Patrick Seitz
Kotosaka	Hiro Shimono	Quinton Flynn
Misaki Yata	Jun Fukuyama	Ben Diskin
Dōhan Hirasaka	Kaori Nazuka	Cherami Leigh
Nagare Hisui	Kazuyuki Okitsu	Robbie Daymond
Saruhiko Fushimi	Mamoru Miyano	Johnny Yong Bosch
Yukari Mishakuji	Masakazu Morita	Chris Hackney
Seri Awashima	Miyuki Sawashiro	Carrie Keranen
Kukuri Yukizome	Satomi Satō	Janice Kawaye
Izumo Kusanagi	Takahiro Sakurai	Todd Haberkorn
Anna Kushina	Yui Horie	Colleen O'Shaughnessey
Rikio Kamamoto	Yūichi Nakamura	Grant George
Tatara Totsuka	Yūki Kaji	Lucien Dodge

== Production ==
On May 26, 2013, it was announced that there will be a sequel to the anime series in the form of a film. The film had a worldwide premiere on July 5, 2014, at Anime Expo in Los Angeles, Japan Expo in Paris, and also select cinemas in Malaysia, Singapore and Taiwan. In Japan, it premiered on July 12, 2014. In the US and Malaysia, it premiered on July 18, 2014, in selected theaters. It was released on Blu-ray and DVD on April 22, 2015. The English cast was revealed by Viz Media on October 7, 2016, and gained its North American release on March 14, 2017.

== Reception ==
The film has not received many reviews in English. Ernest Hardy wrote in The Village Voice, "The film looks great; the animation is detailed, fluid in action and meticulously mapped out. But K Missing Kings is really for diehards who have not only embraced the series but also the handful of manga it spawned.", while Martin Tsai in the Los Angeles Times called it a "hot mess".

K: Missing Kings grossed $826,323 at the box office.
