= GoHands =

Japanese animation studio

GoHands Co., Ltd.

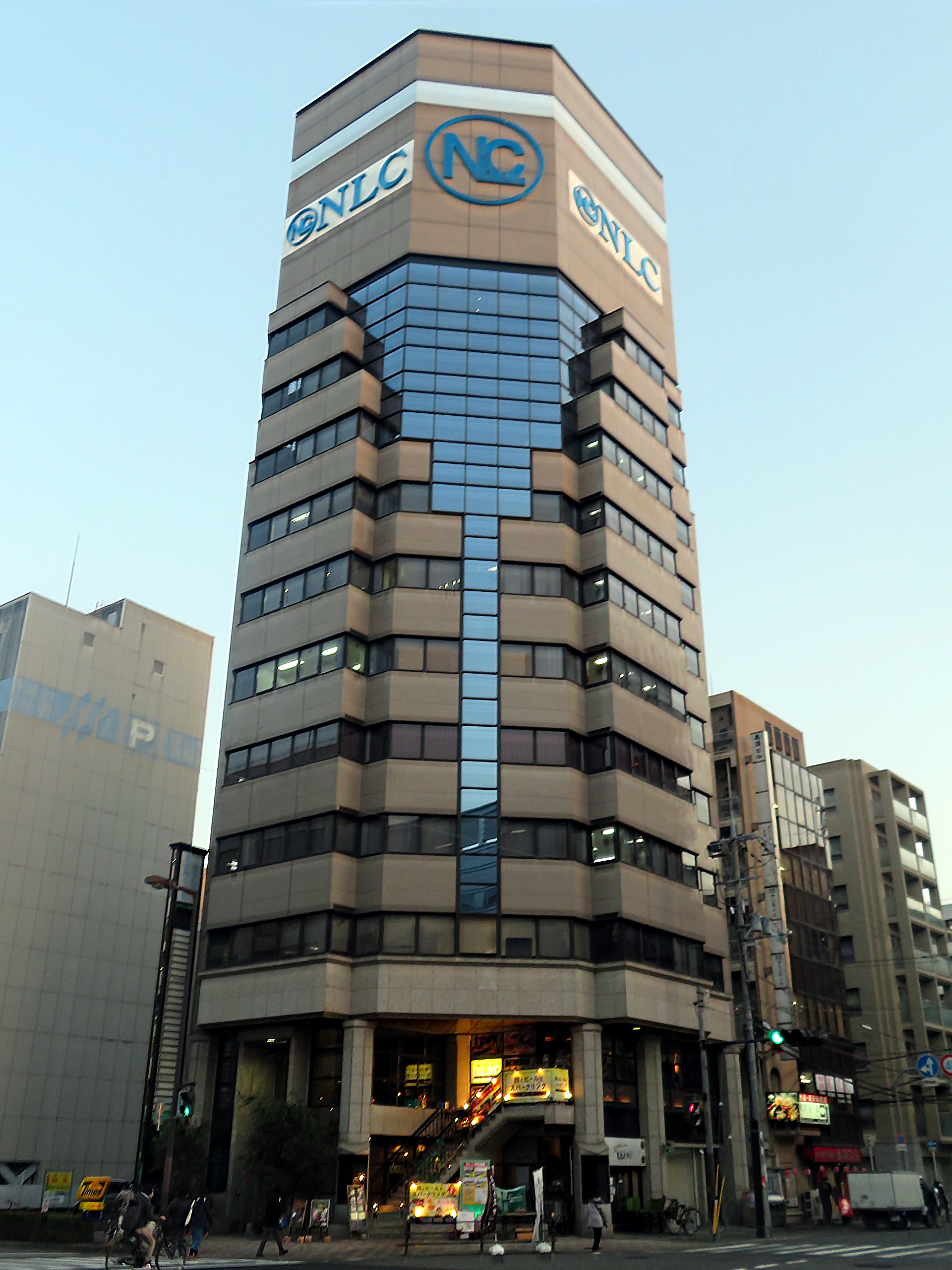
- NLC Shin-Osaka Building 6, where GoHands' main office is located
- Native name: 株式会社GoHands
- Romanized name: Kabushiki-gaisha Gōhanzu
- Type: Kabushiki gaisha
- Industry: Japanese animation
- Founded: August 2008
- Headquarters: Nishinakajima, Yodogawa-ku, Osaka, Japan
- Key people: Ringo Kishimoto (president)
- Number of employees: 63
- Parent: U-Next Holdings
- Divisions: GoHands Laboratory

GoHands Co., Ltd. (Japanese: 株式会社GoHands, Hepburn: Kabushiki-gaisha Gōhanzu) is a Japanese animation studio located in Yodogawa-ku, Osaka. It was founded in 2008 by Ringo Kishimoto and former members of Satelight.

Known for their unique house animation style, GoHands have produced a number of anime series and films, including adaptations of Seitokai Yakuindomo (2010), Mardock Scramble (2010), Coppelion (2013) and The Girl I Like Forgot Her Glasses (2023), as well as original anime including K (2012), Hand Shakers (2017), and Momentary Lily (2025).

== History ==
GoHands was founded in August 2008 by Ringo Kishimoto and other former employees of Satelight's former Osaka Studio 2. The company's name derives from the desire to be able to "put food (ごはん, gohan) on the table by making anime" and the kanji han (阪) used in the Japanese spelling of Osaka Castle (大阪城, Ōsaka-jō). The studio's first production as lead producer was an adaptation of the adult visual novel Princess Lover! in July 2009.

The company has two studios: a head office in Osaka, and a second studio in Suginami Ward, Tokyo. GoHands does not operate a public website or any social media profiles and employs a policy of completing works entirely in-house and completing the production of all television anime episodes before broadcast begins.

On May 25, 2026, U-Next Holdings announced that it had acquired GoHands as a wholly owned subsidiary.

=== Tokyo Babylon 2021 plagiarism controversy and cancelation ===
On October 25, 2020, an anime adaptation of Clamp manga series Tokyo Babylon was announced, to be produced by GoHands in cooperation with King Records. A presentation for the project, entitled Tokyo Babylon 2021, was held on November 19, 2020, confirming that the series would be directed by Shingo Suzuki and Susumu Kudo and premiere in April 2021. A day later, however, on November 20, 2020 the anime production committee was accused of plagiarizing outfit designs from the Volks Doll company, and the K-pop group Red Velvet. After an investigation, on December 4, 2020, the anime producer apologized on their official website and announced that they would be changing the designs. Due to the necessary changes to be made, on December 24, 2020, the anime production committee announced that the series was delayed to an unspecified date. After more cases of plagiarism surfaced through an internal investigation, on March 29, 2021, the production committee announced that the current TV series would be canceled, while a new anime production would be produced by a different studio.

On August 3, 2021, it was reported that GoHands was suing King Records for ¥450 million for failing to pay the expenses they previously agreed to pay. In the lawsuit, it was revealed the GoHands series was planned to have run for 21 episodes. According to the same lawsuit, the first 13 episodes were completed by November 2020.

== Animation style ==
GoHands is known for its unique house animation style, which combines traditional 2D character animation with 3D computer animated backgrounds, often featuring complex camera movements, particle effects, and aggressive postprocessing. The studio's style has been simultaneously described as controversial, striking, and bizarre.

== Productions ==
=== Anime television series ===
Year	Title	Network	Director(s)	Eps.	Note(s)	Refs.
2009	Princess Lover!	Chiba TV	Hiromitsu Kanazawa	12	Adaptation of the eroge visual novel by Ricotta.	
2009	Cheburashka Arere?	TV Tokyo	Susumu Kudō	26	Television shorts based on the Russian children's book character created by Soviet writer Eduard Uspensky.	
2010	Seitokai Yakuindomo	TV Kanagawa	Hiromitsu Kanazawa	13	Adaptation of the four-panel comedy manga series written and illustrated by Tozen Ujiie.	
2012	K	MBS	Shingo Suzuki	13	Original anime created in collaboration with the author group GoRA.	
2013	Coppelion	AT-X	Shingo Suzuki; Hiromichi Kanazawa; Susumu Kudō	13	Adaptation of the military action/science fiction manga series written and illustrated by Tomonori Inoue.	
2014	Seitokai Yakuindomo*	Tokyo MX	Hiromitsu Kanazawa	13	Second season of Seitokai Yakuindomo.	
2015	K: Return of Kings	AT-X	Shingo Suzuki	13	Second season of K.	
2017	Hand Shakers	Tokyo MX	Shingo Suzuki; Hiromitsu Kanazawa	12	Original anime created in collaboration with Frontier Works and Kadokawa.	
2019	W'z	Tokyo MX	Shingo Suzuki; Hiromitsu Kanazawa	13	Original anime sequel to Hand Shakers, set ten years later.	
2021	Project Scard: Scar on the Praeter	JNN	Shingo Suzuki	13	Original anime, based on the Project Scard media project by Frontier Works.	
2023	The Girl I Like Forgot Her Glasses	Tokyo MX	Susumu Kudō; Katsumasa Yokomine	13	Adaptation of the romantic comedy manga series written and illustrated by Koume Fujichika.	
2023	The Masterful Cat Is Depressed Again Today	JNN	Susumu Kudō; Katsumasa Yokomine	13	Adaptation of the slice of life comedy manga series written and illustrated by Hitsuji Yamada.	
2025	Momentary Lily	Tokyo MX	Shingo Suzuki; Susumu Kudō; Katsumasa Yokomine	14	Original anime created in collaboration with Shochiku.	
2026	The Exiled Heavy Knight Knows How to Game the System	JNN	Shingo Suzuki; Tetsuichi Yamagishi; Katsumasa Yokomine	26	Adaptation of the fantasy/isekai light novel series written by Nekoko and illustrated by Jaian.	

=== Anime films ===
Year	Title	Director(s)	Dur.	Note(s)	Refs.
2010	Mardock Scramble: The First Compression	Susumu Kudō	69m	First of a trilogy of films based on the Japanese cyberpunk novel series written by Tow Ubukata.	
2011	Mardock Scramble: The Second Combustion	Susumu Kudō	62m	Sequel to The First Compression.	
2012	Mardock Scramble: The Third Exhaust	Susumu Kudō	66m	Sequel to The Second Combusion.	
2014	K: Missing Kings	Shingo Suzuki	73m	Anime film sequel to K.	
2017	Seitokai Yakuindomo: The Movie	Hiromitsu Kanazawa	60m	Anime film sequel to Seitokai Yakuindomo*.	
2018	K: Seven Stories "R:B - BLAZE -"	Shingo Suzuku	55m	Six-part film series presenting stories from the various clans depicted in K and its sequels.	
2018	K: Seven Stories "SIDE:BLUE - Sirius -"	Shingo Suzuku	61m	Six-part film series presenting stories from the various clans depicted in K and its sequels.	
2018	K: Seven Stories "SIDE:GREEN - Overwrite World -"	Shingo Suzuku	59m	Six-part film series presenting stories from the various clans depicted in K and its sequels.	
2018	K: Seven Stories "Lost Small World - Outside the Cage -"	Shingo Suzuku	66m	Six-part film series presenting stories from the various clans depicted in K and its sequels.	
2018	K: Seven Stories "Memory of RED - BURN -"	Shingo Suzuku	61m	Six-part film series presenting stories from the various clans depicted in K and its sequels.	
2018	K: Seven Stories "Circle Vision - Nameless Song -"	Shingo Suzuku	58m	Six-part film series presenting stories from the various clans depicted in K and its sequels.	
2021	Seitokai Yakuindomo: The Movie 2	Hiromitsu Kanazawa	78m	Sequel to Seitokai Yakuindomo: The Movie.	

=== Original video animations ===
Year	Title	Director(s)	Eps.	Note(s)
2011–2013	Seitokai Yakuindomo	Hiromitsu Kanazawa	8	Additional episodes of Seitokai Yakuindomo released on DVD, some of which were packaged with limited edition manga volumes.
2012	See Me After Class	Hiromitsu Kanazawa	1	Adaptation of the harem romantic comedy series written by Akiyoshi Ohta and illustrated by Munyū.
2014–2020	Seitokai Yakuindomo*	Hiromitsu Kanazawa	10	Additional episodes of Seitokai Yakuindomo*.
2017	Hand Shakers: Go ago Go	Shingo Suzuki; Hiromitsu Kanazawa	1	Additional unaired episode of Hand Shakers; a prequel set four years before the events of the TV series.
2019	W'z: Hand Shakers with W'z	Shingo Suzuki; Hiromitsu Kanazawa	1	Additional unaired episode of W'z, taking place chronologically between Hand Shakers: Go ago Go and Hand Shakers.
