= Satomi Satō =

Japanese voice actress

- 佐藤 聡美
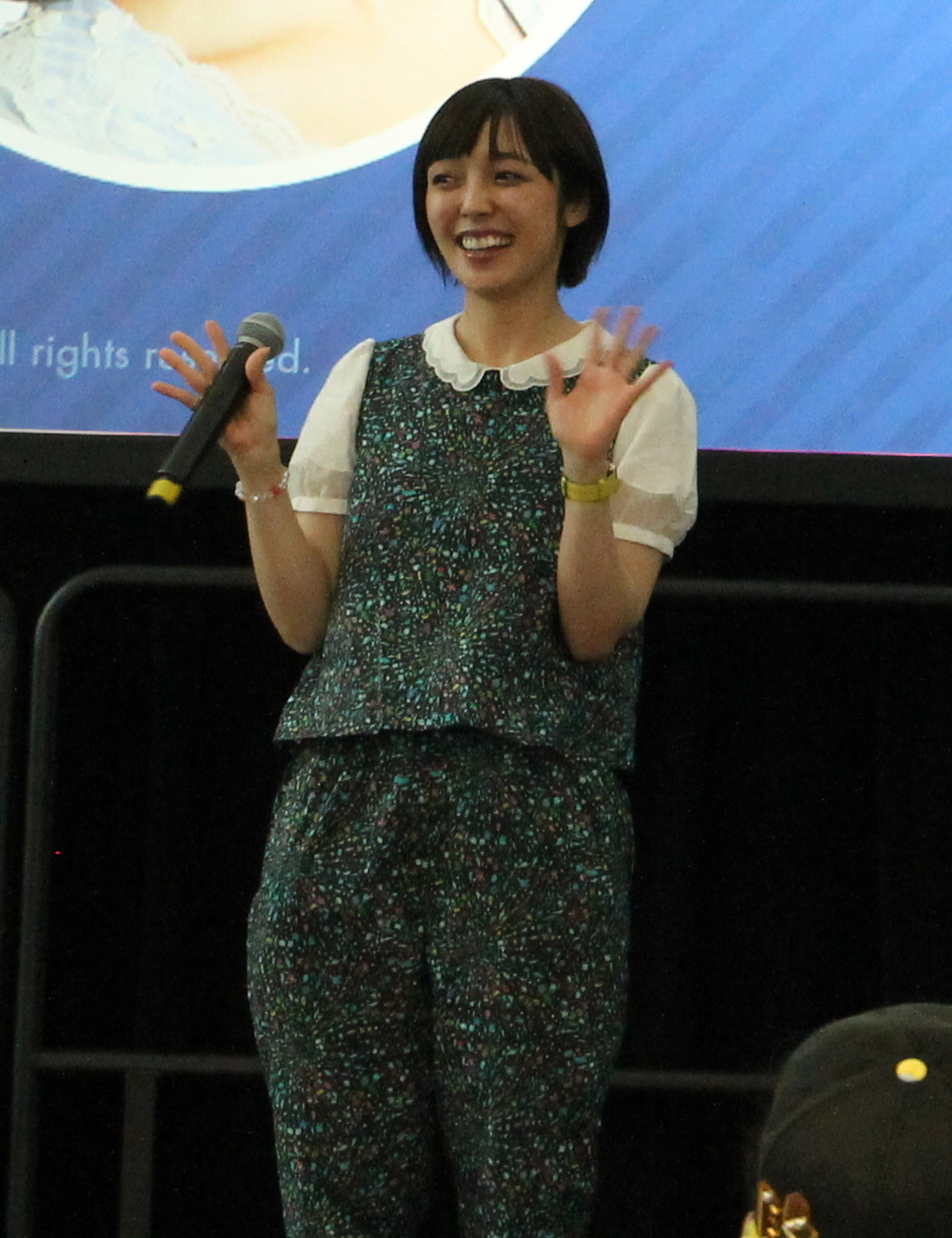
- Satō at FanimeCon 2018
- Born: May 8, 1986 (age 40); Sendai, Miyagi, Japan
- Occupations: Voice actress; singer
- Years active: 2007–present
- Agent: Axl-One
- Notable work: Fire Emblem as Corrin; K-On! as Ritsu Tainaka; Hell Girl as Yuzuki Mikage; Fairy Tail as Wendy Marvell; Wuthering Waves as Aemeath; Fruits Basket as Saki Hanajima; Hyouka as Eru Chitanda; Oreimo as Manami Tamura; Seitokai Yakuindomo as Aria Shichijo
- Height: 153 cm (5 ft 0 in)
- Spouse: Takuma Terashima (m. 2017)
- Children: 1
- Musical career
- Genre: J-pop
- Instruments: Vocals; drums
- Years active: 2014–present
- Label: Starchild
- Website: king-cr.jp/artist/satou_satomi/

Satomi Satō (佐藤 聡美, Satō Satomi; born May 8, 1986) is a Japanese voice actress and singer.

== Biography ==
Satō was previously affiliated with Aoni Production's Junior Talent. She attended Tokyo Announce Gakuin Performing Arts College. She is known as Sugar (しゅがぁ, Shugā), as "satō" (砂糖) means "sugar" in Japanese. On April 1, 2024, she announced that she transferred from Aoni Production to Axl-One.

== Achievements ==
While attending Tokyo Announce Gakuin, Satō was selected to be in the seventh line-up of assistants (Big Bang Grand Prix V) on Miki Tomokazu's Radio Big Bang. As an assistant, she formed the unit Kisty.

== Personal life ==
She announced her marriage with fellow voice actor, Takuma Terashima, on July 6, 2017. On December 30, 2021, she gave birth to her first child with Terashima.

== Filmography ==
=== Anime ===
2007

- Kamichama Karin as Michirian No. 3
- GeGeGe no Kitaro (fifth series) as Female High School Student, Girl and Kijimuna
- Shugo Chara! as Wakana, Ramira
- Fantastic Detective Labyrinth as Yae Yatomi

2008

- GeGeGe no Kitaro (fifth series) as Maid
- Jigoku Shoujo Mitsuganae as Yuzuki Mikage
- Hyakko as Inori Tsubomiya
- Kemeko Deluxe! as Haruka Takayasu, Gal (ep. 5)
- Shugo Chara! Doki as Wakana

2009

- K-On! as Ritsu Tainaka
- Anyamaru Tantei Kiruminzuu as Rimu Mikogami
- Asura Cryin' as Aine Shizuma
- Asura Cryin' 2 as Aine Shizuma
- Dragon Ball Z Kai as Cargo
- Hatsukoi Limited as Yuu Enomoto
- Yumeiro Patissiere as Kanako Koizumi
- A Certain Scientific Railgun as Banri Edasaki, Girl

2010

- K-On!! as Ritsu Tainaka
- Mayoi Neko Overrun! as Otome Tsuzuki
- Seitokai Yakuindomo as Aria Shichijou
- Ookami-san as Machiko Himura/Mysterious Beauty
- Fairy Tail as Wendy Marvell
- Oreimo as Manami Tamura

2011

- Ro-Kyu-Bu! as Manaka Nobidome
- Sket Dance as Chiaki Takahashi
- K-On! the Movie as Ritsu Tainaka

2012

- Fairy Tail the Movie: The Phoenix Priestess as Wendy Marvell
- Dusk Maiden of Amnesia as Kanoe Yukariko
- Hyouka as Eru Chitanda
- K as Kukuri Yukizome
- Queen's Blade Rebellion as Lyla
- Kamisama Hajimemashita as Ami Nekota
- Magi: The Labyrinth of Magic as Sahsa
- Bodacious Space Pirates as Lilly Bell

2013

- Hyakka Ryōran Samurai Bride as Inshun Hōzōin
- Karneval as Erisyuka
- A Certain Scientific Railgun S as Edasaki Banri
- Ore no Imōto ga Konna ni Kawaii Wake ga Nai. as Manami Tamura
- Kiniro Mosaic as Sakura Karasuma
- Golden Time as NANA
- Free! - Iwatobi Swim Club as Chigusa Hanamura and Nagisa Hazuki (child)

2014

- Is the Order a Rabbit? as Chiya Ujimatsu
- The Irregular at Magic High School as Mizuki Shibata
- Seitokai Yakuindomo* as Aria Shichijou
- Fairy Tail as Wendy Marvell
- K: Missing Kings as Kukuri Yukizome
- Pretty Guardian Sailor Moon Crystal as Naru Osaka
- In Search of the Lost Future as Karin Fukazawa
- Denkigai no Honya-san as Tsumorin
- Girl Friend Beta as Kokomi Shiina
- My Neighbor Seki as Sakurako Gotō

2015

- Assassination Classroom as Yukiko Kanzaki
- K: Return of Kings as Kukuri Yukizome
- Hello!! Kiniro Mosaic as Sakura Karasuma
- Seiyu's Life! as Rin's mother
- Is the Order a Rabbit?? as Chiya Ujimatsu

2016

- Assassination Classroom 2nd Season as Yukiko Kanzaki
- Girls Beyond the Wasteland as Uguisu Yūki
- Keijo as Mari Murata
- Tales of Zestiria the X as Magilou

2017

- Fairy Tail Movie 2: Dragon Cry as Wendy Marvell
- The Irregular at Magic High School: The Movie – The Girl Who Summons the Stars as Mizuki Shibata
- Seitokai Yakuindomo: The Movie as Aria Shichijo
- Magical Girl Lyrical Nanoha: Reflection as Kyrie Florian

2018

- B: The Beginning as Yuna
- IDOLiSH7 as Tsumugi Takanashi
- Death March to the Parallel World Rhapsody as Nadi
- Rascal Does Not Dream of Bunny Girl Senpai as Fumika Nanjō
- Fairy Tail (2018) as Wendy Marvell

2019

- Endro! as Meigo / Maid Golem
- Fruits Basket as Saki Hanajima
- Wasteful Days of High School Girls as Lily Someya
- Knights of the Zodiac: Saint Seiya as Andromeda Shaun
- Phantasy Star Online 2: Episode Oracle as Matoi
- Demon Slayer: Kimetsu no Yaiba as Tanjiro Kamado (child)
- One Piece as Speed, Guarana
- Kandagawa Jet Girls as Syoco

2020

- Bofuri as Iz
- Fruits Basket: 2nd Season as Saki Hanajima
- Is the Order a Rabbit? BLOOM as Chiya Ujimatsu
- Wandering Witch: The Journey of Elaina as Nino

2021

- Seitokai Yakuindomo: The Movie 2 as Aria Shichijo
- B: The Beginning Succession as Yuna
- The Dungeon of Black Company as Belza
- Non Non Biyori Nonstop as Shiori's mother

2022

- Princess Connect! Re:Dive Season 2 as Ninon
- Play It Cool, Guys as Asami Futami

2023

- Bofuri 2nd Season as Iz
- The Masterful Cat Is Depressed Again Today as Saku's Mother
- Hirogaru Sky! Pretty Cure as Puwa

2024

- Fuuto PI: The Portrait of Kamen Rider Skull as Saeko Sonozaki/Taboo Dopant

2025

- Zatsu Tabi: That's Journey as Fuyune Kōjiya
- With You and the Rain as Ren
- A Gatherer's Adventure in Isekai as Pnir/Hofvalpnir

2026

- Ghost Concert: Missing Songs as Riku Aoki

=== Theatrical animation ===
2026

- Assassination Classroom the Movie: Our Time as Yukiko Kanzaki

=== Video games ===
2009

- Tales of the World: Radiant Mythology 2 as Descender
- Yakuza 3 additional voices

2010

- God Eater as Gina Dickinson, Female voice 01
- God Eater Pachi-slot as Aki Tamashiro (Female Protagonist), Gina Dickinson
- Elsword as Ara Haan
- Tales of Phantasia: Narikiri Dungeon X as Wonder Chef
- K-On! Hōkago Live!! as Ritsu Tainaka
- Koumajou Densetsu II: Stranger's Requiem (紅魔城伝説II 妖幻の鎮魂歌) as Hong Meiling

2011

- Tales of the World: Radiant Mythology 3 as Lazaris
- Otomedius Excellent as Gesshi Hanafuuma, Ryukotsuki, Gradian Operator
- Magical Girl Lyrical Nanoha A's Portable: The Gears of Destiny as Kyrie Florian

2012

- Phantasy Star Online 2 as Matoi
- Digimon World Re:Digitize as Akiho Rindou
- New Class of Heroes: Chrono Academy as Mauriat
- Rune Factory 4 as Amber
- Tales of Xillia 2 as Nova

2013

- The Legend of Heroes: Trails of Cold Steel as Alfin Reise Arnor
- God Eater 2 as Gina Dickinson

2014

- Granblue Fantasy as Carren
- Samurai Warriors 4 as Lady Hayakawa
- Super Smash Bros. 4 as female Corrin (DLC)
- The Legend of Heroes: Trails of Cold Steel II as Alfin Reise Arnor

2015

- God Eater 2: Rage Burst as Gina Dickinson
- Xenoblade Chronicles X as Celica
- Fire Emblem Fates as female Corrin and female Kana
- Fate/Grand Order as Caster of Midrash/Queen of Sheba

2016

- Girls Beyond the Wasteland as Uguisu Yūki
- Tales of Berseria as Magilou
- Fushigi no Gensokyo TOD -Reloaded- as Reimu Hakurei

2017

- Fire Emblem Heroes as female Corrin, female Kanna and Naga
- Touhou Genso Wanderer as Reimu Hakurei
- Azur Lane as KMS Roon, IJN Hakuryuu
- Fire Emblem Warriors as female Corrin
- The Legend of Heroes: Trails of Cold Steel III as Alfin Reise Arnor

2018

- Princess Connect! Re:Dive as Ninon
- Super Robot Wars X as Amari Aquamarine
- Girls' Frontline as JS05 and HK23
- Arena of Valor as Diao Chan
- The Legend of Heroes: Trails of Cold Steel IV as Alfin Reise Arnor
- Super Smash Bros. Ultimate as female Corrin

2019

- Pokémon Masters EX as Caitlin
- Kemono Friends 3 as Cerberus
- Duel Masters PLAY'S as Elena, Guardian of Light

2020

- Arknights as Dorothy
- Kandagawa Jet Girls as Syoco
- The Legend of Heroes: Trails into Reverie as Alfin Reise Arnor
- Punishing: Gray Raven as Selena

2021

- Blue Archive as Amami Nodoka
- Gate of Nightmares as Uretan

2022

- Food Girls 2: Civil War as Coco
- Counter:Side as Nanahara Chinatsu
- Koumajou Remilia: Scarlet Symphony as Hong Meiling
- Goddess of Victory: Nikke as N102 and Anne

2023

- Fire Emblem Engage as Female Corrin

2025

- Genshin Impact as Escoffier
- Persona 5: The Phantom X as Minami Miyashita
- Stella Sora as Nanoha
- Duet Night Abyss as Psyche
- Umamusume: Pretty Derby as Godolphin Barb

2026

- Wuthering Waves as Aemeath
- Granblue Fantasy as Mikaboshi

=== Radio ===
- Kisutī no kisutī taimu (kistyのkisty time) on internet radio station BBQR
- Tomokazu Miki no rajio bigguban (智一・美樹のラジオビッグバン)（QR, November 2005 til September 2006
- Tanahashi Mai to Satō Satomi no ranchitaimu myūjikku (棚橋麻衣と佐藤聡美のランチタイムミュージック), September to December 2007
- Mai to Shugā no masshu rūmu (麻衣としゅがぁのまっしゅ☆Room), 4-5 pm Saturdays, January to March 2008
- Rajio Dotto Ai; Satō Satomi no shugaa potto (ラジオどっとあい 佐藤聡美のしゅがぁぽっと), October 9, 2009, till January 1, 2010
- Rajio☆Satomi Hakkenden! (ラジオ☆聡美はっけん伝！), 9-10 pm Fridays, April 8, 2011, till April 8, 2014

=== Drama CD ===
- Gattsu Batorā Jī (ガッツバトラーG) as Girl
- Nusunde Ririsu (盗んでリ・リ・ス) as Maid
- Renai Idenshi XX (恋愛遺伝子XX) as Mizuki

=== Dubbing ===
- Ender's Game as Petra Arkanian (Hailee Steinfeld)

=== Others ===
- Voiceroid+ as Zunko Tohoku
- Vocaloid as Zunko Tohoku's voice provider

== Singles and albums ==
- "Koibito wa tententen" (恋人は......) with Kisty

As the voice actor for Ritsu Tainaka in K-On!, she participated in four singles and one album.

- "Cagayake! Girls" ranked No. 2 on Japanese Oricon singles charts.
- "Don't say 'lazy'" ranked No. 3 on Oricon singles charts, and was awarded Animation Kobe's "Best Song" award.
- "Light and Fluffy Time" ("ふわふわ時間") ranked No. 3 on Oricon singles charts.
- "Ritsu Tainaka" ("田井中律") image song CD of the eponymous character, ranked No. 5 on Oricon singles charts.
- Hōkago Teatime (放課後ティータイム) ranked No. 1 on Oricon albums charts.
