= List of Seitokai Yakuindomo episodes =

Seitokai Yakuindomo is an anime series adapted from the manga of the same title written and illustrated by Tozen Ujiie. Produced by GoHands, the anime aired in Japan between July 4 and September 26, 2010. Original video animation episodes of the anime have been shipping with the limited editions of the manga volumes, beginning with the fifth volume released on April 15, 2011. These episodes are also produced by GoHands and they are numbered as if they continued the TV series. A second season, titled Seitokai Yakuindomo* (生徒会役員共*, Seitokai Yakuindomo Asutarisuku) premiered on January 4, 2014. All episodes directed by Hiromitsu Kanazawa.

== Episode list ==
=== Season 1 (2010) ===
No. overall	No. in season	Title	Original release date
1	1	"Under The Cherry Tree"; Transliteration: "Sakura no ki no shita de" (Japanese: 桜の木の下で)	July 4, 2010
1	1	"Will I Get This Feeling Every Time?"; Transliteration: "Maikai tsuzuku no kono kanji?!" (Japanese: 毎回続くのこの感じ?!)	July 4, 2010
1	1	"For Now, Let's Try Stripping"; Transliteration: "Toriaezu nuide miyō ka" (Japanese: とりあえず脱いでみようか)	July 4, 2010
Takatoshi Tsuda, on his first day of high school, is recruited to join Ousai Academy's student council as the vice president. Shino gives him a tour of the school. They go over some school rules and start a suggestion box. Hata interviews Shino for the school paper, but the process seems to resemble that of an eroge.
2	2	"By the Way, Are You S or M?"; Transliteration: "Toki ni kimi wa esu ka emu ka?" (Japanese: 時に君はSかMか?)	July 11, 2010
2	2	"In That Case, I'll Be Testing That Strength of Yours"; Transliteration: "Naraba kimi no sono chikara o tamesasete moraō" (Japanese: ならば君のその力を試させてもらおう)	July 11, 2010
2	2	"This Thing of Yours That Sparkles Brightly, What Is It?"; Transliteration: "Kirakira to kagayaku koitsu wa onushi no nan da?" (Japanese: きらきらと輝くこいつはお主のなんだ?)	July 11, 2010
Mutsumi asks Takatoshi for help in getting a judo club established. Takatoshi asks the girls for tutoring help. The council cleans out a classroom full of storage materials, during which Yokoshima is introduced. Aria worries about night stalkers.
3	3	"Even I Admit It's Well Wrapped"; Transliteration: "Ware nagara migoto na tsutsumi guai da" (Japanese: 我ながら見事な包み具合だ)	July 18, 2010
3	3	"President! Open It Wider!"; Transliteration: "Kaichō! Motto suso o hirogechatte kudasai!" (Japanese: 会長! もっと裾を広げちゃってください!)	July 18, 2010
3	3	"You Had Enough Already!?"; Transliteration: "Mō manpuku na no ka!?" (Japanese: もう満腹なのか!?)	July 18, 2010
Shino and Aria go to Kyoto for their class trip. Takatoshi tries to get his council work done but is distracted by Kotomi's requests. Suzu invites Takatoshi over.
4	4	"So I Dress Untidy in Invisible Places"; Transliteration: "Dakara mienai tokoro de kikuzushite iru" (Japanese: だから見えないところで着崩している)	July 25, 2010
4	4	"Congratulations"; Transliteration: "Omedetā" (Japanese: おめでたー)	July 25, 2010
4	4	"So It's Fine for Me This Way"; Transliteration: "Dakara watashi wa koko made de ii" (Japanese: だから私はここまででいい)	July 25, 2010
Shino returns with gifts for the gang. Topics include melon bread, milk, hot weather and counseling, The council celebrates Shino's birthday. Afterwards, Takatoshi shares an umbrella with Shino.
5	5	"Isn't It Hard On Your Ass?"; Transliteration: "Oshiri, taihen desho?" (Japanese: お尻、大変でしょ?)	August 1, 2010
5	5	"I'm Just Frustrated!"; Transliteration: "Yokkyū fuman na dake da!" (Japanese: 欲求不満なだけだ!)	August 1, 2010
5	5	"I Should Run to School With Bread in My Mouth, Too!"; Transliteration: "Watashi mo pan o kuwaete tōkō shinakya!" (Japanese: 私もパンをくわえて登校しなきゃ!)	August 1, 2010
Takatoshi has a cold and receives a visit from Shino, whose activities are misinterpreted by Takatoshi's sister Kotomi. Later, Shino must honor her commitment of being photographed at the swimming pool. Aria asks Shino for advice on a "crush" she has. Yokoshima tries to trap Takatoshi in a classroom. The council makes a web page.
6	6	"Tsuda-kun Won't Read It, He'll Use It!"; Transliteration: "Tsuda-kun wa yomanai wa! Tsukau no yo!" (Japanese: 津田くんは読まないわ! 使うのよ!)	August 8, 2010
6	6	"If There's a Bottom, Then There Has to be a Top!"; Transliteration: "Uke ga aru nara seme ga aru darō!" (Japanese: 受けがあるなら攻めがあるだろー!)	August 8, 2010
6	6	"No, Please Wear Clothes"; Transliteration: "Iya, fuku wa kite Koi" (Japanese: いや、服は着て来い)	August 8, 2010
The council investigates some of the scary school legends. Yokoshima shows the council a porn magazine she confiscated. The council visits Mutsumi's judo club. Shino gets the hiccups. The council prepares for a day at the beach.
7	7	"It's Gradually Getting Bigger"; Transliteration: "Dandan ōkiku natteku wa" (Japanese: だんだん大きくなってくわ)	August 15, 2010
7	7	"Tsuda-kun is Boy's Love"; Transliteration: "Tsuda-kun wa bōizu rabu" (Japanese: 津田君はボーイズラブ)	August 15, 2010
The council spends a day at the beach, and a night at an inn.
8	8	"Oh?! You're the Strawberry Panties from This Morning!"; Transliteration: "A?! Omae wa asa no ichigo pantsu!" (Japanese: あ?!お前は朝のイチゴパンツ!)	August 22, 2010
8	8	"Virgin Sex Might Become Popular"; Transliteration: "Fudeoroshi ga hayaru kamo shiren" (Japanese: 筆おろしが流行るかもしれん)	August 22, 2010
8	8	"I'll Fight in Place of the Others!"; Transliteration: "Minna no bun made watashi ga tatakau!" (Japanese: みんなの分まで私が戦う!)	August 22, 2010
The council plans events for sports day. Suzu visits Takatoshi's house and meets Kotomi. Takatoshi gains the respect of the girls by eliminating the bugs that scare Shino. Discipline Committee head Kaede Igarashi confronts the council about their activities at the inn. When one of the judo members gets injured, Shino volunteers to take her place.
9	9	"How Much Will You Pay?"; Transliteration: "Ikura de kaimasu?" (Japanese: いくらで買います?)	August 29, 2010
9	9	"I See! We Have Nothing to Do! With That!"; Transliteration: "Naruhodo! Kankei nai na! Oretachi!" (Japanese: なるほど!関係ないな!俺たち!)	August 29, 2010
9	9	"Venezuela"; Transliteration: "Benezuera" (Japanese: ベネズエラ)	August 29, 2010
The council prepares for sports day. Takatoshi writes a surprisingly touching story. The council participates in various sports day events for their class, and then as a team for the final group relay.
10	10	"The Maid Saw It! The Young Lady's Lewd (Omission)"; Transliteration: "Meido wa mita! Ojō-sama no midara na (ryaku)" (Japanese: メイドは見た!お嬢様の淫らな(略))	September 5, 2010
10	10	"I Don't Have Any Hidden Settings Like That"; Transliteration: "Ore ni sonna kyara settei wa nai" (Japanese: 俺にそんなキャラ設定はない)	September 5, 2010
10	10	"If You Are All Right With Me, Then I'll Go Out With You"; Transliteration: "Watashi de yokereba tsukiau ga" (Japanese: 私でよければ付き合うが)	September 5, 2010
The council visits Aria's home and meets her maid Dejima. Takatoshi sees school reporter Hata on her daily activities. The school conducts a cultural festival.
11	11	"I've Never Seen Natural Phenomena Like This"; Transliteration: "Konna seiri genshō mita koto ga nai" (Japanese: こんな生理現象見た事がない)	September 12, 2010
11	11	"Should I Have My Wear Underwear On?"; Transliteration: "Shitagi mo tsuketa hō ga ii?" (Japanese: 下着もつけたほうがいい?)	September 12, 2010
11	11	"Santa's Sexual Desires"; Transliteration: "Santa-san no seiheki" (Japanese: サンタさんの性癖)	September 12, 2010
Takatoshi helps Kotomi prepare for the Ousai Academy interviews. Random gags about the cold weather, and misunderstandings. The council cleans up the club room, and then celebrates Christmas at Aria's vacation house.
12	12	"It's Usually Embarrassing"; Transliteration: "Ippanteki na hajirai desu" (Japanese: 一般的な恥じらいです)	September 19, 2010
12	12	"School Uniforms Are Best Half-Undressed"; Transliteration: "Seifuku wa han nugi ga sōba da yo" (Japanese: 制服は半脱ぎが相場だよ)	September 19, 2010
12	12	"Was That Your Way of Doing Exhibitionism?"; Transliteration: "Kimi nari no roshutsu purei ja nakatta no ka?" (Japanese: 君なりの露出プレイじゃなかったのか?)	September 19, 2010
The student council celebrates the new year. Yokoshima catches a cold. Takatoshi receives chocolates for Valentine's Day. Kotomi does her entrance exam and interview for Ousai.
13	13	"Seitokai Yakuindomo! Thanks!"; Transliteration: "Seitokai Yakuindomo! Otsu!" (Japanese: 生徒会役員共!乙!)	September 26, 2010
The council visits the robot research club and meets Nene Todoroki. More daily school life gags. Kotomi walks to school as the credits roll. The council recaps highlights from the series with a bit of revisionist history.

==== OVAs (2011-2013) ====
No. overall	No. in season	Title	Original release date
14	1	"Seitokai Yakuindomo (Student Council Staff Members) Have Returned"; Transliteration: "Kaettekita Seitokai Yakuindomo" (Japanese: 帰ってきた生徒会役員共)	April 15, 2011 (with manga vol. 5 LE)
It's spring, and Kotomi enters Ousai Academy. Shino thinks of trying her version of exposure play while giving a speech during Entrance Ceremony. Shino gives Kotomi a tour of Ousai Academy, as Takatoshi gets deja vu. Takatoshi is now classmates with Suzu and Nene, and finds that his frequency of tsukkomi will increase. Kaede meets the Tsuda siblings walking together on a rainy day. Hata interviews Kotomi, and both of them compete to see who knows about Takatoshi the most by revealing his embarrassing secrets. Kotomi introduces her new friend, Toki. At first, she seems like she is a delinquent, but they find out she is actually just a clumsy girl. Aria records Shino's ambiguous sentences, and is excited to play them back. Hata interviews Toki. Shino reveals that Takatoshi is next in line to be the Student Council President. Hata interviews Dejima. On Ousai Sketching Competition day, the Student Council members draw each other, with various indecent jokes. In the broadcasting room, Shino still tries to do her own version of exposure play while giving a speech. In a post-credits scene, Takatoshi and Shino meet with Amano while walking to school, and Shino is surprised to see her vice president and ex-vice president get along really well.
15	2	"Not Bad Big Brother"; Transliteration: "Hanpanai aniki" (Japanese: はんぱない兄貴)	November 17, 2011 (with manga vol. 6 LE)
15	2	"Elementary School Student Council"; Transliteration: "Jidoukai yakuindomo" (Japanese: 児童会役員共)	November 17, 2011 (with manga vol. 6 LE)
Kotomi is being lazy in her room during spring break, a week before the entrance ceremony. Shino, Aria and Suzu comes to Tsuda's house to give Kotomi congratulatory presents for enrolling, which happens to be books, books and more books. Kotomi tries to tease Suzu about walking with Takatoshi to school, though surprisingly, her tease is spot on. Various front of gate moments. Toki comes to school wearing a t-shirt, yet she forgot to take off the price tag. Kotomi realizes that her brother is popular with girls, though he replies that they are just people he occasionally interacts with, as she misunderstands the statement. There jokes about Suzu and her height. Yokoshima complains about being disrespected, while acting indecently. There are various jokes about student council cleaning day. The Ousai Academy Swimming Contest is going to start, so the student council cleans the swimming pool. Mutsumi, Suzu and Shino win their respective races. Various jokes about missing items in the pool. While looking at Shino, Kotomi says that she might be a new genre "taikou moe" character. While Shino was in Ousai Elementary School, a new trainee teacher named Koyama transfers in for two weeks. Shino surprises her from the start by asking private questions and mispronouncing phrases.
16	3	"Feeling Like the Azure Sky while the President is Blue"; Transliteration: "Kibun wa aozora, kaichō wa burū" (Japanese: 気分は青空 会長はブルー)	April 25, 2012
16	3	"High Risk Feels Good"; Transliteration: "Hai risuku ga kimochiii" (Japanese: ハイリスクが気持ちいい)	April 25, 2012
16	3	"Uniform Decoration"; Transliteration: "Dōgi no kunshō" (Japanese: 道着の勲章)	April 25, 2012
16	3	"Ousai - Eiryou Academy Exchange Meeting"; Transliteration: "Ōsai-Eiryō gakuen kōryūkai!" (Japanese: 桜才・英稜 学園交流会!)	April 25, 2012
Also known as Seitokai Yakuindomo OVA. Yokoshima talks about her little cousin. Shino tells Takatoshi to watch her carefully so he can be the next student council president. Shino deals with her horoscope reading. The council conducts club inspections. The council meets over summer vacation. They act as sports managers for the judo club. The council hosts a visiting student council and their president, Uomi.
17	4	"Doggy"; Transliteration: "Wanko" (Japanese: わんこ)	July 17, 2012 (with manga vol. 7 LE)
17	4	"The Situation at Tsuda's House"; Transliteration: "Tsuda-ka no jijō" (Japanese: 津田家の事情)	July 17, 2012 (with manga vol. 7 LE)
17	4	"If You Have Straight Hair, It Feels Good When Your Hair Grazes Your Nipples, Right?"; Transliteration: "Sutorēto dato kega chikubi ni kosure te kimochiii desuyone" (Japanese: ストレートだと毛が乳首にこすれて気持ちいいですよね)	July 17, 2012 (with manga vol. 7 LE)
Suzu's dog gets loose and makes his way to the school. The council girls visit Takatoshi and Kotomi's house when a typhoon hits. Aria hosts a fireworks party at her house.
18	5	"Important Things Before Flowers"; Transliteration: "Hanayori mo taisetsunamono" (Japanese: 花よりも大切なもの)	February 15, 2013 (with manga vol. 8 LE)
18	5	"The Seven Mysteries of Ousai"; Transliteration: "Ōsai nanafushigi" (Japanese: 桜才七不思議)	February 15, 2013 (with manga vol. 8 LE)
18	5	"Design"; Transliteration: "Gara" (Japanese: 柄)	February 15, 2013 (with manga vol. 8 LE)
Takatoshi finds a dried squid in the student council room. He tries to clean, but he spills waters from the pail onto his trousers, as Shino enters the room and start misunderstanding everything. It's spring, and the student council members plus Dejima and Kotomi goes flower viewing. Suzu helps a kid get her trapped balloon down from a tree. More jokes about sake. Another Takatoshi and Dried Squid episode, where Shino tells Suzu and Aria what she saw (misunderstandingly). It's summer, and the student council members investigate The Seven Mysteries of Ousai with Hata, with the last mystery actually just Yokoshima assaulting male students. The next Takatoshi and Dried Squid segment, Shino explains what she saw to Kaede, who passes out as a result. It's fall. Tokky gets lost while looking for the cafeteria. More happenings in cafeteria. Yokoshima complains about not being a good advisor, yet she gives bad advice. The student council tries to insert a new menu at the cafeteria by using the suggestion box, which ends up being cake. Uomi comes to Ousai once more, and seek advice from Shino.
19	6	"Promises Won't Do"; Transliteration: "O yakusoku ja sumasanai ze" (Japanese: お約束じゃ済まさないぜ)	May 8, 2013
19	6	"The School at Night"; Transliteration: "Yoru no gakuen" (Japanese: 夜の学園)	May 8, 2013
19	6	"Brother Love Culture Festival"; Transliteration: "Ani baka bunkasai" (Japanese: 兄バカ文化祭)	May 8, 2013
Also known as Seitokai Yakuindomo Kaettekita OVA Vol.1 The council deals with the summer heat. The stairs cause a lot of falls. The school has another culture festival. Uomi plays in a softball game. Shino and the girls participate as Miss Ousai contestants.
20	7	"Hagimura Suzu's Day"; Transliteration: "Hagimura Suzu no ichinichi" (Japanese: 萩村スズの1日)	July 10, 2013
20	7	"Talk About Rides"; Transliteration: "Norimono danngi" (Japanese: 乗り物談義)	July 10, 2013
20	7	"Jealousy Chocolate"; Transliteration: "Yakimoki choko" (Japanese: やきもきチョコ)	July 10, 2013
Also known as Seitokai Yukindomo Kaettekita OVA Vol. 2 Takatoshi gets a cold so Suzu has to be the straight-man for the day. The council patrols after school; Dejima gives them a limo ride. Takatoshi gets chocolates for Valentine's Day. In a post-credits scene, Shino and Takatoshi go shopping.
21	8	"Maid Class and the Unbelievable Feeling"; Transliteration: "Meido kyoushitsu to masaka no kimochi" (Japanese: メイド教室とまさかの気持ち)	October 17, 2013 (with manga vol. 9 LE)
21	8	"High School Girl Home Tutor: Amakusa Shino"; Transliteration: "Jyoshikousei amakusa shino" (Japanese: 女子高生家庭教師 天草シノ)	October 17, 2013 (with manga vol. 9 LE)
21	8	"The Future Hole"; Transliteration: "Mirai no ketsu" (Japanese: 未来の穴)	October 17, 2013 (with manga vol. 9 LE)
The Ousai student council members use the suggestion box in order to invite a person to give speech about his/her job; when the most popular job ends up being maid, and Dejima-san voluntarily gives lessons to the students in cleaning and cooking. In Takatoshi and Dried Squid, the culprit is revealed to be Kotomi, who got a dried squid from Yokoshima. Takatoshi is glad that it was all just a misunderstanding, until Kotomi reveals that the tissues on the table were put there by her intentionally to invoke misunderstanding, which angers him. Aria tries to decline an engagement proposal, so she asks Takatoshi to pretend to be her boyfriend, to Shino's and Suzu's chagrin. The engagement is cancelled in the end because the groom is Dejima-san's customer. Takatoshi and friends are going to have a test, so Shino helps Takatoshi and Suzu study in the student council room. Takatoshi, Suzu, Nene, Mutsumi and Chiri have a group study. Aria invites everyone to the new Shichijou Hot Spring Hotel. Shino realizes that Uomi is big-breasted. Hata tries to spy on the girls bathing by using a video camera tied on a remote-controlled helicopter, but Mutsumi foils the plan. The girls talk about new year's resolutions. Tokky reveals that she wants a piercing (on her ear), as Shino deliberately misunderstands. Everyone (minus the tied-up Yokoshima) watch the first sunrise of the year.

=== Season 2: Seitokai Yakuindomo* (2014) ===
No. overall	No. in season	Title	Original release date
22	1	"Under the Cherry Blossom Trees, Once Again"; Transliteration: "Mata sakura no ki no shita de" (また桜の樹の下で)	January 4, 2014
22	1	"The Sleepy Season, Slip"; Transliteration: "Nemunemu no kisetsu poro" (ねむねむの季節ポロッ)	January 4, 2014
22	1	"A Wolf Pretends"; Transliteration: "Neko o kabutta ōkami" (ねこをかぶったオオカミ)	January 4, 2014
Ousai Academy starts a new school year. Suzu's dog, Boa, visits the school. Kotomi joins as a first year, though she was late because she lost her cellphone on the way. The student council is concerned about improper relationships at school. In "Takatoshi and Dried Squid: Max Power", Takatoshi founds a dried squid on the student council room's door. As he is just starting to eat yogurt, he sees Aria's sex toy, and he accidentally splatters the yogurt over it. Mutsumi sets up a match with Toki, where Toki will have to join the judo club if she loses.
23	2	"I Was Watching Over Hagimura Suzu"; Transliteration: "Hagimura Suzu o mimamotteimashita" (萩村スズを見守っていました)	January 11, 2014
23	2	"Ousai & Eiyou Have Another Mixer!"; Transliteration: "Ōsai-Eiryō gakuen kōryūkai okawari!" (桜才・英稜学園交流会おかわり!)	January 11, 2014
23	2	"Always Have Tissues Ready for Your Check-up"; Transliteration: "Shōjō chekku jōbi wa poke tisshu" (症状チェック常備はポケティッシュ)	January 11, 2014
Hata introduces the student council members in a galge fashion. Some gags about the art pieces in class. Suzu fells under the weather so the council has her rest in the infirmary. Shino shows Uomi different locales on campus, but their comments on each place involve innuendo, as Takatoshi feels a deja vu. Shino introduces Uomi to Igarashi. Uomi states her concerns about the placement of the men's restroom. Aria starts a "What's This?" segment, where she shows the silhouette of something, and the other student council members guess what is it. It turns out to be a frog with long legs. Gags about allergies and mouse pads. Aria objects to some of Shino's claims. Takatoshi makes a poster. The girls ask Takatoshi for tissues. Uomi asks Takatoshi if there's a girl he likes. In Takatoshi and Dried Squid, Hata founds Takatoshi, and attempts to sensualized the topic despite knowing the truth.
24	3	"The Three-Day Vice President"; Transliteration: "Mikka fukukaichō" (三日副会長)	January 18, 2014
24	3	"Beautiful Lady"; Transliteration: "Chindara kanushama yo" (ちんだら かぬしゃまよ)	January 18, 2014
Takatoshi asks Kotomi to act as vice president while his class goes to Okinawa. Nene has some gags involving her device. Kotomi joins Aria and Shino for morning inspections. As the class tours Okinawa, Hata appears and asks Takatoshi to check on two teachers who seem to be flirting with each other. Suzu is separated from the group; the students and teachers look for her. When Yokoshima freaks out over a display stand for spotted dick, they find Suzu. Shino ponders whether to call Takatoshi. The next day, the class visits a lighthouse and has fun at the beach; Shino, Aria and Kotomi do the same. The class feeds fish underwater while wearing diving helmets. Kotomi asks Shino whether she and Takatoshi are dating, so Shino calls Takatoshi. When Suzu and Takatoshi return they share some snacks they bought. Michishita catches Naruko in the middle of a masturbating attempt using fish foods (in school, no less).
25	4	"Emphasis Point Point Point"; Transliteration: "Kyouchou bui buibuibui" (強調部位ブイブイブイ)	January 25, 2014
25	4	"Moe-tail"; Transliteration: "Moe teiru" (萌えテイル)	January 25, 2014
25	4	"Always Peeled Back at Groundbreaking Levels"; Transliteration: "Kakkiteki zuru muke" (画期的ズルむけ)	January 25, 2014
Uomi appears at the school in Shino's gym clothes as her own clothes got wet in the rain. She observes the council as they do their activities in the office. Hata interviews them. Shino and Takatoshi walk the halls. Kaede-chan has a "Tell 'em, Kaede-chan!" segment where she walks the halls and observes each of the student council girls. In Takatoshi and Dried Squid (Max Power), Takatoshi is approached by Aria, who then runs away out of misunderstanding, which forces Tsuda to leave the student council room. In "Todoroki Nene's Extensive Knowledge" segment, Nene tells about the history of dildos. Takatoshi and the gang study at the library. They talk about the fairy tales they like. Various antics of the student council members during midterm exams. Takatoshi and Kotomi have to take make-up exams, so they have a study session with the council girls at their house. Aria does a "what is this?" segment; the object is a vibrator. For Golden Week, the council members visit Aria's company amusement park, test the rides and enjoy dinner afterwards. Kotomi reveals that she goes commando halfway during the trip since she wet herself.
26	5	"Support Style"; Transliteration: "Sasae sutairu" (支えスタイル)	February 1, 2014
26	5	"Pitching a Tent After the Deed"; Transliteration: "Nugi ato mokkori" (ぬぎあと もっこり)	February 1, 2014
26	5	"Fighting Girls"; Transliteration: "Tatakau shoujo-tachi" (戦う少女達)	February 1, 2014
Kotomi accidentally sends a superimposed picture of Takatoshi to Shino (she intends to send a photo of Takatoshi when he was a baby). The council members talk about food and the summer weather. In Unadapted Manga Episode segments, Aria makes a crossed arm pose, another kaku-kaku-shika-jika joke, Suzu mistakenly speed reads Aria's erotic novel (and can't forget about it), Kotomi complains about Takatoshi being a dependable person, Dejima calls Aria about her chastity belt key. It starts to rain. Hata photographs the council members as they model the new school swimsuits. The females (minus Suzu) keep asking Takatoshi to wear a pad on his crotch. On the way home, they cut through a park, as they stumble upon Dejima. The judo girls practice for a marathon by running through the town, but Toki gets lost. A stray cat visits campus. Aria finally takes in the cat (and its family). The council holds a send-off assembly for the judo club. A "SYD Shopping" segment, where Aria and Shino sell Oman's national women's marathon training jersey for ¥19,194.
27	6	"Student Council President: The Idol"; Transliteration: "Aidoru seito kaichō" (アイドル生徒会長)	February 8, 2014
27	6	"Attack Item Throb"; Transliteration: "Kōgeki aitemu bikubbikun" (攻撃アイテムビクッビクン)	February 8, 2014
Shino is recruited to become a Japanese idol by R Princess. She pictures life as an idol, where she gets along with the staff, meets with Triple Booking, and does quite well at the tasks given, including modeling and singing at concerts. But when she sees Takatoshi dating a girl who resembles her, she wakes up from her dream and declines the offer. In "Aria's What's This?" segment, she asks about what is going on in a steamy car in traffic. In the "Takatoshi and Squid" segment, Suzu helps Takatoshi clean up, though the splattered yogurt Takatoshi claims is sticky. The girls ponder self-defense strategies and take lessons from the judo club. Igarashi is especially worried as it means having to interact with Takatoshi. Impressed by judo's coolness, Kotomi wants to enter judo club, but back off before she even started on the next day. Igarashi tries to combat her fear of males. In Unadapted Manga Episode, Kotomi using heat as an excuse to not study, Aria and Dejima having a "naked bonding", Takatoshi accidentally injures his right hand. In "Takatoshi and Squid" segment continuation, Aria, Shino and Kotomi are concerned about what they have observed, and without any tsukkomi present, the chat derails into chaos, and they finally decide to meet Takatoshi.
28	7	"I Said Something Good"; Transliteration: "Umai koto itte yatta ze" (上手いこといってやったぜ)	February 15, 2014
28	7	"The Ones Who Make You, You"; Transliteration: "Kimi o terasu ookii sonzai" (君を照らす大きい存在)	February 15, 2014
28	7	"Yep, It Came Out"; Transliteration: "Mita manma tarenagashi" (見たまんま たれ流し)	February 15, 2014
In SYD Shopping segment, Aria and Shino sell an SYD bicycle, a beach cruiser for ¥45,451. Suzu walks her dog Boa and meets Dejima, Hata, Yokoshima and her own mother. Jokes about lettering. The council receives gifts from various clubs. They talk about flower and flower language. Joke about buying two of the same things. Shino tries out the different clubs and finds she is good at everything. Takatoshi accidentally be the airhead of the conversation. Tsuda siblings look at each other's report card. The siblings pull out a telescope for Kotomi's independent research; the council girls join them to look at the stars. They comment about the Summer Triangle tale of Hikoboshi and Orihime. The council gets the school swimming pool ready for use. The day of the pool opening, the student council acts as lifeguards. Toki realizes that Kotomi has no tan lines despite being tanned. Takatoshi reveals that he passed Eiryou's entrance exam, but choose to go to Ousai because it's nearer to home. Shino forgets to bring underwear, and have no choice but to go commando after she jumps into the water to save Kotomi. In "Yokoshima's Teacher English" segment, Yokoshima teaches on how to pronounce a cocktail's name.
29	8	"Play with Water and Get Soaked"; Transliteration: "Nami to no tawamure bichobicho da ze" (波との戯れ びちょびちょだぜ)	February 22, 2014
29	8	"All-purpose Wing"; Transliteration: "Bannō uingu" (万能ウィング)	February 22, 2014
29	8	"Summer Night, Summer Morning"; Transliteration: "Natsu no yoru natsu no asa" (夏の夜 夏の朝)	February 22, 2014
During summer, the council goes to the beach again, this time to help Yokoshima scout the place for a school trip. Various jokes about peace sign by Shino throughout the episode. Yokoshima chases a boy and gets drunk again so they stay at the inn. That night they have a test of courage which freaks Suzu out. They also hear a mysterious tapping in the wall. Afterwards, the student Council members plus Kotomi goes to the summer festival nearby. Shino, Aria and Suzu visit Tsuda's house to complete their summer homeworks (though Kotomi runs away). Dejima serves various food and drinks throughout the day. Joke about wingless. In "Dried Squid and Takatoshi" segment, Takatoshi cannot explain about the stain to Suzu, as everyone assemble in the student council room. Shino gets lonely and calls everyone individually and converses with them. Suzu has an overnight study party with Nene and Mutsumi where they take a break to walk Boa. Takatoshi confronts Kotomi about the edited photo where he poses in a speedo as a muscleman. It turns out she has another version of edited picture that she submits for her independence research, angering Takatoshi even more.
30	9	"Hata Ranko Does It!"; Transliteration: "Hata Ranko kamasu" (畑ランコ カマす)	March 1, 2014
30	9	"Female Alumni are Super Awesome"; Transliteration: "OG wa choberigu" (OGはチョベリグ)	March 1, 2014
30	9	"Got the Wrong Idea"; Transliteration: "Guuzen gokai itadakichuu" (ぐーぜん誤解 いただき中)	March 1, 2014
Jokes about Takatoshi's breakfasts. The council helps Hata with articles for the school newspaper. They interview their teachers on difficult phrases to say. They suspect the two teachers, Daimon and Michishita, are a couple and during the interviews discover they are engaged, to Yokoshima's dismay. Former student council president Furuya visits Ousai and then invites the council to a festival at her university. They meet the girls from Triple Booking, with Shiho getting deja vu about meeting Shino. Uomi and Takatoshi discover they are attending the same wedding and that they will be relatives-in-law. Jokes about table manners. Uomi asks the Tsuda siblings to call her "Onee-chan", while she calls Takatoshi "Taka-kun". Shino pouts when she hears about it later. In "Aria's What's This?" segment, the item is strap-on dildo.
31	10	"The Tsuda Mushroom was as Expected"; Transliteration: "Tsuda kinoko wa souteinai" (津田キノコは想定内)	March 8, 2014
31	10	"Feathers Fly"; Transliteration: "Hane ga tobu" (羽根が飛ぶ)	March 8, 2014
31	10	"What it Feels Like to be a Pumpkin"; Transliteration: "Kabocha no kimochi" (カボチャの気持ち)	March 8, 2014
The council clean up their room. When Shino mentions that saving money by going to local farmers' markets is something a good woman should do, Aria invites the council and Kotomi to her family's mountain retreat where they pick wild mushrooms and other edible plants. Takatoshi compliments Hagimura's Suzu bell which gets her flustered. Jokes about asking to see the mushroom Takatoshi found. They stay over at the family cabin. The student council is in charge of lost and found. Kotomi "lost" her math homework to avoid reality. Kotomi found an underwear, which turns out to be Aria's. Takatoshi vs Suzu in a mock badminton match, as Takatoshi demands a Suzu (bell) for winning, to Suzu (person)'s embarrassment. Joke about telling to go out. The council prepares for Halloween festivities and dress up. Shino wears a witch costume, Aria a succubus, Takatoshi as dracula and Suzu as a pumpkin monster. Jokes about being tsundere while giving things. Everyone recognizes Suzu in a pumpkin costume, while she wonders about the reason. Rain almost cancels their costume contest, but the weather clears in time. Shino accompanies Takatoshi for shopping, as they found two big mushrooms.
32	11	"A Pure Reaction to a Double Entendre"; Transliteration: "Urayougo ni jun hannou" (裏用語に純反応)	March 15, 2014
32	11	"That Happens in Some Countries"; Transliteration: "Ichibu no kuni de wa sou rashii desu" (一部の国ではそうらしいです)	March 15, 2014
32	11	"Play With the Snow, Santa's Heirs!"; Transliteration: "Yuki to tawamure Santa no matsuei" (雪と戯れ サンタの末裔)	March 15, 2014
The council review some of the school rules. Shino's attempt on shortening phrases ends up terrible. The student council talks to the disciplinary committee about end of year cleaning. The council plans surprise club inspections but is concerned about leaks. They try using a secret code involving tops and bottoms, which is misinterpreted by Hata. Jokes about "how much". Takatoshi helps Shino with her cellphone but is shocked by her message. The council and Kotomi visit Eiryou High School for their cultural festival. They give the cooking class a try. Uomi reveals that she actually is an introvert, and she tries to overcome it when she enters high school. Winter arrives, the council shovels snow at school. The student council talks about shortening phrases, which turns it lewd. They have a stew party in the dark at Tsuda's house. Kotomi attempts to be a silent character, but fail. Suzu effectively prevents Kotomi from sleeping after eating. That night Shino dresses as Santa and gives everyone presents, and forces Takatoshi to come along.
33	12	"It's Happy New Year"; Transliteration: "Akeome da yo" (あけおめだよ)	March 22, 2014
33	12	"What It Takes to Stand Above Someone"; Transliteration: "Hito no ue ni tatsu utsuwa" (人の上に立つ器)	March 22, 2014
33	12	"Virgin"; Transliteration: "Dou**i" (どう○い)	March 22, 2014
33	12	"I Can't Believe You're Washing That"; Transliteration: "Sore o arau nante tondemonai" (それを洗うなんてとんでもない)	March 22, 2014
The council members visit a New Year's sale. Suzu talk about high (price). They meet with Kaede, Uomi and Hata. Takatoshi lends his sister some money, though she misunderstands on how he wants her to pay it back. Hata interviews the student council members, Yokoshima and Mutsumi about their New Year's resolutions. In return, Shino asks about her resolutions. The "Takatoshi and Dried Squid" segment is back: Takatoshi finds out that the yogurt stain is actually a fake slime. Jokes about shoes, lunch, indirect kiss. Mutsumi asks student council members to help her to find someone to be the judo team manager. Kotomi feels like applying, but Toki denies her on the spot. Various jokes about judo club members. Dejima teaches the council girls how to make chocolate for Takatoshi for Valentine's day. The girls give chocolate to Takatoshi. In "Todoroki Nene's Extensive Knowledge" (last) segment, she tells about the history of taro stem from Kumamoto prefecture. While shopping for White Day gifts, Takatoshi meets Uomi, and then the other girls gather. To conclude the "Takatoshi and Dried Squid: Max Power" segments, Takatoshi checks the girls for alibis, and Hata immediately confess her crime without problem. In a post-credits scene, Shino makes lunch for the Tsudas. Afterwards, when Tsuda says goodbye to Shino, he unexpectedly meets Uomi, which does not go unnoticed by Shino, Mutsumi, and Suzu.
34	13	"How to Talk About Love Properly"; Transliteration: "Tadashii koibana" (正しい恋バナ)	March 29, 2014
34	13	"Long Range Attack"; Transliteration: "Enkyori atakku" (遠距離アタック)	March 29, 2014
34	13	"Hair Showing"; Transliteration: "毛のラインナリ" (Ke no line nari)	March 29, 2014
34	13	"Cherry Blossom Sky"; Transliteration: "Sakura no sora" (桜の空)	March 29, 2014
Takatoshi is surprised to find Uomi at his house, ready to make dinner. Shino arrives with food and they engage in a friendly rivalry. They watch a DVD of a silent film and stay the night. Aria and Suzu visit the next day and help clean. Takatoshi makes bukkake soba for lunch. In the evening, the Tsuda parents tell their children that they are coming back tomorrow instead, and all of them (including Suzu and Aria) stay over. Hata tries to come up with some slogans for the council members and captions about Takatoshi and Shino's relationship. Kotomi jokes about "have a place to return to". Igarashi tries to overcome her fear of males. She accidentally slips on the stairs but is saved by Takatoshi. She founds out that she is only immune to Takatoshi's touch and not other men. As Aria and Shino go to graduation, Takatoshi and Suzu do some council activities on their own. Yokoshima claims there is no easier place to advise than the student council. Various class 2-B antics about duty, hard to talk phrases, be a guy, hair problems, present for Daimon-sensei. Takatoshi gives a speech at the graduation ceremony, where Shino, Aria, Hata and Igarashi are present. While the graduates are leaving the school, Takatoshi and Suzu catch up to Aria and Shino and ask why they are leaving without saying goodbye. They reveal they have not graduated yet (it is the end of Takatoshi's first year) and that they are actually holding sushi rolls, which they make dirty jokes about.

==== OVAs (2014-2020) ====
No. overall	No. in season	Title	Original release date
35	1	"One on One"; Transliteration: "1 tai 1" (1対1)	May 16, 2014 (with manga vol. 10 LE)
35	1	"Clap-clap Slap"; Transliteration: "Pachi pachi panpan" (パチパチパンパン)	May 16, 2014 (with manga vol. 10 LE)
The student council members celebrate new year at Tsuda's house. Various random moments in student council room. Hata spreads rumors about Shino and Takatoshi, and Igarashi asks Suzu to find out, even then, bad communications turn it into another misunderstanding. Shino tries to be a humorous leader, though she didn't realize that she is one from the start. Suzu parents go on a vacation, so Mutsumi and Nene stays at Hagimura's house. They watch a horror movie, to Suzu's horror. In Unadapted Manga Episodes (Full Throttle) segment: the girls are in a sauna, student council members + Kotomi, Tokky and Dejima go on a ski vacation. Aria's "What is this" segment features a blasting-off rocket model. The student council members do a heat endurance contest during summer at Tsuda's house, with Shino secretly intending to lose weight (but failing). The student council organizes a cold endurance contest for Ousai students instead by having them stay in the swimming pool covered with ice. Kotomi implies that she wet herself (inside the pool), but the truth is still a mystery. As the ice melts away, Suzu and Mutsumi win the contest in a tie. Shino wants to clap by spanking Tsuda since her hand is full. In "Tell them, Uomi" segment, Uomi works part-time in a fast-food restaurant. Furuya comes visiting in the evening, and expertly finds out that Shino is going commando.
36	2	"Farewell, Coin"; Transliteration: "Sayonara koin" (さよならコイン)	October 22, 2014
36	2	"A Bunch of Strong People"; Transliteration: "Tsuwamono no tsudoi" (強者の集い)	October 22, 2014
36	2	"Waking Up to Muscle Memory"; Transliteration: "Ohayōgozaimasu karada no kioku" (おはようございます体の記憶)	October 22, 2014
Shino hurts her leg in P.E, so Tsuda is asked to replace her to give speech during assembly. Tsuda practices on his speech. Hata asks the student council help to take pictures of judo club members. As they can't decide on the last two pictures to use as the poster, they decide to choose it by flipping coin. Tokky flips a coin, but as the clumsy girl she is, the coin is lost. In Unaired Episode segment, Yokoshima-sensei eats a healthy diet, Shino gives advice to a downed Takatoshi, Shino warns Tokky about her flashy shirt, Mutsumi changes places with other people, Takatoshi watches the girls talking about body (part) shapes. A sports festival between schools starts. Aria becomes a cheerleader. Shino and Uomi compete on what Takatoshi should call them (as both of them respond to the call 'President', and it's before Takatoshi becomes Uomi's relative). On the second day, Suzu and Takatoshi take pictures of the Tennis Club for Newspaper Club. Takatoshi founds Yokoshima-sensei disguising herself as an Ousai student and forces her to change clothes. On the third day, Tokky and Mutsumi win their respective competitions, despite the former having a leg injury. The student council members do radio exercise during September, with Kaede joins in.
37	3	"Advisor"; Transliteration: "Koumon"	February 17, 2015 (with manga vol. 11 LE)
37	3	"Comparing Boobs at the Speed of Light"; Transliteration: "Kōsoku no chichi kurabe" (光速のちちくらべ)	February 17, 2015 (with manga vol. 11 LE)
37	3	"Going to School in Bad Weather"; Transliteration: "Akuten tōkō" (悪天登校)	February 17, 2015 (with manga vol. 11 LE)
Takatoshi wakes Kotomi from her sleep, and a concerned Uomi barges in wearing apron with a ladle in hand. Joke about misinterpreting of the meaning of Koumon. The student council talks about love and relationships, with Hata trying to pry upon the (non-existing) love triangle in the council. Student council members are in charge of lost and found. Kotomi lost her Excalibur (umbrella). They find a photo album, and the evidences points to Hata as the owner. Hata lost her camera, but then immediately disclaims it when they want her to prove that the lost camera is hers by telling what pictures are in there. They talk about lost gloves. Takatoshi and Shino have their hands stuck at the Koumon (back gate). Shino replaces the fluorescent lamp, but she loses grip of it. Aria saves it from falling as it bounces off her chest, to Shino's dismay. Aria and Shino try to exchange circumstances of their breasts, but it still doesn't change anything. It's time for marathon race. Kotomi trains to be so fast as to leave afterimages. Shino mishears Takatoshi's (and other's) sentences a few times. The starter pistol breaks, so they resort to spanking sounds instead. Mutsumi wins the second year category. Shino wins the third year race against Aria by a sliding finish. It's autumn, and the student council members sweep the falling leaves. Afterwards, they cook roasted sweet potato using the leaves. It's winter, and since snow is falling, the Tsuda siblings and Suzu go to school, only to find out that the school is closed for the day. Yokoshima-sensei eats with them at student council room. Afterwards, they play Ousama Game. In parent-teacher meeting, Uomi acts as Takatoshi's guardian (since Tsuda parents are out of town), and Takatoshi tells that he acts as Kotomi's guardian as well.
38	4	"Fighting Humanoid Robot"; Transliteration: "Hito-gata kessen robotto" (人型決戦ロボット)	September 17, 2015 (with manga vol. 12 LE)
38	4	"Uncivilized Hole (Top) Feeling in the Back (Bottom)"; Transliteration: "Mikai no ana haigo no kanshoku" (未開の穴 背後の感触)	September 17, 2015 (with manga vol. 12 LE)
38	4	"Sweet Morning"; Transliteration: "Yasashii asa" (やさしい朝)	September 17, 2015 (with manga vol. 12 LE)
The student council has a routine meeting, and then a patrol around the campus. Aria's "What is this?" segment features a starfish. Aria, along with Shino, trains Takatoshi, Suzu, Todoroki and Mutsumi, practice tennis at the Shichijos' court, with Boa the dog and Dejima the maid attempting to peek. They lose anyway due to muscle pain. Igarashi tries to deal with her fear of boys. Hata charges her voice recorder in front of Takatoshi while acting like she's confessing her love. Takatoshi and Fried Squid (Max Power) segment, it shows Hata's movements on framing Takatoshi from beginning until the end. Uomi waits for Takatoshi in front of the Ousai gate, attracting attention. Uomi stays over at Tsudas' house (just the two of them, as Kotomi is staying over at Tokky's house), and the next morning, Shino, Aria and Suzu arrive, and go over what happened last night. They talk so much they are late for school. Shino founds a superimposed picture of Takatoshi (courtesy of Kotomi), and loses the bet of not laughing for the day.
39	5	"The Conclusion to an Urban Legend"; Transliteration: "Toshi densetsu no ketsuron" (都市伝説の結論)	April 15, 2016 (with manga vol. 13 LE)
39	5	"Flag Construction Site"; Transliteration: "Furagu kenchikuchi" (フラグ建築地)	April 15, 2016 (with manga vol. 13 LE)
Nozomi Mori, the vice-president of the student council of Eiryou High School, is introduced into the anime. Uomi is late to school due to staying over at Tsuda's house. The student council talks about appearances, and Takatoshi is dense enough not to realize any subtle changes (including girls' feelings for him). Yokoshima-sensei asks the student council on how to be respected by uttering words of wisdom. She ends up giving birth to a terrible saying. The Ousai student council joins Hata in her investigation on an urban legend about a kappa that emerges from the river and attacks the anus of the passerby, and the subject turns out to be Dejima. Shino and Uomi exchange their positions for one day as an interaction between the two student councils. At Ousai, Uomi pursues intimate interactions with Takatoshi; meanwhile, at Eiryou, Shino feels uneasy (though she still makes the usual jokes). In an attempt to cheer Shino up, Mori asks Shino about her vice-president, though this makes her sulk more. In a post-credits scene, Takatoshi, Aria and Suzu go to Eiryou to pick up Shino, making her happy; Nozomi sees Takatoshi, and seemingly gets attracted to him.
40	6	"3 Days of Deserted Island Life"; Transliteration: "Mikkakan mujintō seikatsu" (３日間無人島生活)	December 16, 2016 (with manga vol. 14 LE)
40	6	"Late Summer's Greetings"; Transliteration: "Zansho mimau" (残暑見舞う)	December 16, 2016 (with manga vol. 14 LE)
The council talks about doodling. During summer break, the student council members plus Kotomi go to the Shichijou family's deserted island for three days. Uomi goes to Tsuda's house for a late summer's visit. Mutsumi borrows a "Rabu doll" from the student council for Judo practice. Various jokes about the judo club members. The Tsuda siblings and the council girls have a study session at Tsuda's house and make ice cream together. Shino, Tsuda and Aria model the school uniforms.
41	7	"The Student Council's Long Way Home"; Transliteration: "Seitokai no yorimichi" (生徒会の寄り道)	September 15, 2017 (with manga vol. 15 LE)
41	7	"The Coloring is Amazingly White"; Transliteration: "Karāringu wa odoroki no shirosa" (カラーリングは驚きの白さ)	September 15, 2017 (with manga vol. 15 LE)
41	7	"The Vice-President Swims Like a Rock"; Transliteration: "Fukukaichō wa kanadzuchi" (副会長はカナヅチ)	September 15, 2017 (with manga vol. 15 LE)
With tests over, the council takes 'the long way home' (though, as Takatoshi notes, going home and changing out of their uniforms kind of defeats the purpose of calling it that). The trip includes stopping at the fast food place where Uomi works (much to Aria's delight, as she normally does not dine on such food), underwear shopping, and karaoke. Takatoshi is late for school, and is to be made to clean the Student Council room as punishment, but because Aria has already done so, the council ends up cleaning the bathrooms, starting with the men's; the inevitable discussion about urinals ensues. When it comes time to clean the women's restroom, it's discovered that someone has been bringing in makeup (due to the smell). The girls talk about accessories. Shino mishears a question from Takatoshi about face cream. The Student Council conducts receipt reviews to determine whether club funds are being used appropriately; the Newspaper, Chorus, Robot Research, and Judo clubs all submit records for review. According to the Moral Enhancement Report, mismatched uniform violations have dropped, but Shino worries that students might start wearing their swimsuits underneath their uniforms (with Takatoshi realizing that his is sister is one of the people likely to do that). Ms. Yokoshima's declaration of a surprise bag inspection leads to the council performing such an inspection of their own bags, with humorous results. Ms. Koyama meets Furuya. A continuation of the 'seaside school' segment from the movie sees the students at an aquarium, and on the train ride back, Takatoshi and Shino discuss possible career choices, with the former causing an unintentional misunderstanding when asked about it by Aria. A skit with Kotomi and Tokki. At Eiryou, their pool is getting ready to open, and Nozomi reveals she can't swim. As she's embarrassed about the thought of practicing at her own school pool, Uomi contacts Shino to use Ousai's pool. Thanks to the combined efforts of both student councils, Nozomi does learn how to swim. In a post-credits scene, Shino intercepts Takatoshi after school, but the latter is still annoyed about a question she asked him the last time this occurred. Shino replies that she can't help it, and Takatoshi quips that he can't help being her straight man, though he insists she give it a rest for the day.
42	8	"Two Hot People"; Transliteration: "Futari no atsui hitobito" (二人の熱い人々)	April 17, 2019 (with manga vol. 17 LE)
42	8	"Cherry Blossoms THE MOVIE"; Transliteration: "Sakura THE MOVIE" (桜 THE MOVIE)	April 17, 2019 (with manga vol. 17 LE)
42	8	"Eiryou High School student from the volleyball team" Transliteration: "Barēbōruchīmu no Ei-ryō kōkōsei" (バレーボールチームの永陵高校生)	April 17, 2019 (with manga vol. 17 LE)
Shino hopes for something good to happen while watching the cherry blossoms fall. Takatoshi helps out in an Art room, but accidentally breaks a piece of pottery. While attempting to put it back together, he gets glue on his hand, and Kaede, who happens to be passing by, sees the glue, and, thinking it's blood, grabs his hand, getting stuck to him as a result. Since there's not enough time to get them unstuck before a meeting, the two are forced to sit through it stuck together. During said meeting, a proposal is floated to use brightly colored balloons to deter birds from flying over the school's athletic fields, and Shino endorses it. Takatoshi and Kaede are eventually separated, but not before the former gets hot water poured on him. Kotomi gets a bad grade in Home Economics, and, bemoaning her lack of experience, becomes the manager for the Judo Club. The council checks up on the Judo club. Kotomi accidentally washes the underwear of the Judo Club members while they shower, forcing everyone to go commando. Another 'What's This' segment with Aria. Ousai's Film Club is entering a competition, and the Student Council members end up participating in the production (thanks to Takatoshi being willing to do so, whereas all 3 girls initially decline); Suzu is eventually chosen as the lead heroine, with Shino and Aria as the other two heroines. Various jokes, including the inevitable mention of AVs, abound during production. At Eiryou, a need for someone tall (to reach a box on a shelf) results in Uomi semi-forcibly recruiting Yuu Hirose into the Eiryou Student Council ranks. The two student councils meet later on, to introduce Yuu to Ousai's council (with Uomi referring to Yuu as a 'ghost officer' beforehand, much to Suzu's discomfort). In a post-credits scene, the film made earlier in the episode is previewed, and the post-production process is detailed.
43	9	"A-part Detective"; Transliteration: "A pāto tantei" (A パート探偵)	August 16, 2019 (with manga vol. 18 LE)
43	9	"Straight man Quartet"; Transliteration: "Tsukkomi Karutetto" (ツッコミカルテット)	August 16, 2019 (with manga vol. 18 LE)
43	9	"Say it again with Uomi's voice" Transliteration: "Uomi boisu de kore itte" (魚見ボイスでこれ言って)	August 16, 2019 (with manga vol. 18 LE)
The Ousai Student Council has been fascinated by mystery novels, and Aria pulls some strings to have the Shichijō Groups new detective program set up for them (as well as Uomi and Kotomi, who tag along). On the way there, the council members discuss the concept of having life goals, with the Tsuda siblings realizing they lack them. The tour bus 'breaks down' and the group heads for a nearby mansion, and the 'owner' agrees to let them stay the night. Takatoshi finds a note in the room he chooses saying that he is supposed to be the culprit. Shino's panties go missing, and Takatoshi assumes the role of detective. While Shino and Takatoshi are talking, Kotomi's panties go missing, disqualifying Takatoshi as the culprit. After a warning is given at dinner, Suzu's bra goes missing. After all the futons are moved into one room, Takatoshi deduces that Dejima is the culprit. The council participates in a community report meeting, along with Furuya, who has free time due to her classes being canceled. The Robot Research, Newspaper, Chorus, Film, and Pottery clubs all give reports. Takatoshi and Nozomi bump into each other while out and about; Nozomi teases him about buying food while wearing his school uniform, but gets confused when he buys a double crepe; it turns out he hadn't had lunch that day. At Eiryou, Nozomi proves adept at imitating Uomi's voice; since the latter has lost her voice because of a cold, Nozomi has to fill in for her during a PA broadcast. However, she can't fool Takatoshi when he calls Uomi. The Ousai Student Council pays a visit to Eiryou to check on Uomi, where Takatoshi inadvertently causes a misunderstanding. In a post-credits scene, Shino again intercepts Takatoshi after school while he's wearing the school mascot costume. The two walk, and she apologizes for being so strict with him when they first met, and admits there may have been an ulterior motive for her actions. She tries to tell him something, but cannot get the words out; it then turns out that the person in the costume isn't Takatoshi at all, but the school principal, and Shino gets very embarrassed about the mixup. When Takatoshi himself arrives, Shino's embarrassment is heightened, and her resolve crumbles.
44	10	"An Angry Mutsumi has Plenty of Spirit"; Transliteration: "Ikari no Mutsumi kiai jūbun" (怒りのムツミ気合十分)	September 17, 2020 (with manga vol. 19 LE)
44	10	"God Fingers Tsuda Takatoshi"; Transliteration: "Gotto Fingā Tsuda Takatoshi" (ゴットフィンガー津田タカトシ)	September 17, 2020 (with manga vol. 19 LE)
44	10	"It's a Double Date Kaede-san"; Transliteration: "W Dēto da Kaede-san" (Wデートだカエデさん)	September 17, 2020 (with manga vol. 19 LE)
Shino discusses the meaning of kiss placement with her fellow council members. Nene and Suzu are discussing cakes, and Mutsumi reveals that the Ousai Judo Club will be challenging the Seikou Girls Academy Judo Club. She announces that she intends to get a part time job before the match (as she needs to pay for snacks, since they're not covered by her clubs budget). Takatoshi gets a job at the same mall. While on the clock, Shino and Suzu run into them while Mutsumi is upbraiding Takatoshi for talking while in costume. Suzu has her picture taken with Takatoshi while the latter is in costume, and inadvertently places one of her hands in a sensitive area. Shino, Suzu, and Aria watch some balloon art, and Aria has a joke about condoms. Shino and Suzu intervene when Mutsumi and Takatoshi are taking off their respective costumes (as Mutsumi's bra is visible through her shirt). Later on, the Ousai Judo Club, with the Student Council and Ranko tagging along (as moral support and reporter, respectively), heads off to the match. On the bus ride, Shino mulls over seat reclining etiquette, while Mutsumi has to deal with her motion sickness. While everyone else is sleeping, Ranko attempts to take pictures of them, but is thwarted because everyone is wearing sleep masks. After arriving at Seikou, both clubs prepare for the match, Ranko explains the rules. Tokky is first up, and is bested by her opponent; Chiri Nakazato wins her match. This leaves Mutsumi's match as the deciding one for the overall match; as it happens, her opponent's surname is Tsuda (no relation to Takatoshi and Kotomi). After a pitched match, Mutsumi is victorious, handing the overall victory to Ousai. Afterwards, the Ousai contingent spends time at a hot spring inn, courtesy of Seikou. While there, Ranko again attempts to get pictures of everyone while sleeping but is thwarted again (this time because everyone is sleeping face down). This is followed by a cooking segment with Shino and Chihiro, featuring lamb and vegetable stir fry. During Golden Week, Nao Hanamaki and her boyfriend Yoshi-kun plan to go to a theme park, to which Kaede reminds her that she's still a student; in response, Nao invites her to join them, and asks Takatoshi to be Kaede's date, much to the shock of the other student council members. Although Kaede claims she and Takatoshi are only there to supervise, she starts having fun (although she does not realize it), and Nao remarks that she and Takatoshi get along well. At the haunted house, Kaede and Takatoshi run into Dejima, who notes that the theme park is operated by the Shichijou group, and notes that Aria and the others are watching via the surveillance cameras. Kaede wins a stay at the theme park's attached hotel after throwing a coin into a fountain; the other members of the Student Council invite themselves along to stay. The group ends up holding a study session to assuage Kaede's discomfort about spending the night, but eventually gets side-tracked by karaoke. On the train ride home, Kaede reflects on the experience, and admits that it was fun, but quickly admonishes herself, thinking that she only wants to go to the theme park again. In a post-credits scene, Shino bemoans the fact that she has only hung out with Takatoshi once outside of school by herself, and that was only because Suzu and Aria couldn't make it, whilst others, such as Kaede, Nozomi, and Ranko, have spent time with him outside of school. She intends to ask him out on a date, but when she encounters him in the hallway, the words once again fail to come out. However, Takatoshi inadvertently gives her an opening when he notices the tickets she is holding, and she says that they're for the four of them. Having both failed and succeeded at her objective, she tears up, prompting Takatoshi to ask what is wrong. Shino partially salvages the situation by saying that she only has two tickets at present, and that she and Takatoshi will go and pick up the other two together after school, to which he agrees.
