= K (TV series) =

2012 anime series

- Promotional artwork for the anime featuring the main cast of characters
- Genre: Action, science fantasy
- Created by: GoRA; GoHands
- Manga

K: Memory of Red
- Written by: GoRA
- Illustrated by: Yui Kuroe
- Published by: Kodansha
- Magazine: Aria
- Original run: May 28, 2012 – August 15, 2013
- Volumes: 3
- Anime television series
- Directed by: Shingo Suzuki; Hiromichi Kanazawa (Note: Series Director (シリーズディレクター).); Susumu Kudō
- Produced by: Hiroo Maruyama; Haruki Hayashi; Gō Nakanishi
- Written by: Tatsuki Miyazawa (GoRA)
- Music by: Mikio Endō
- Studio: GoHands
- Licensed by: NA: Viz Media; UK: Kazé UK (former); Anime Limited (current)
- Original network: MBS, TBS, CBC, AT-X, BS-TBS
- English network: NA: Neon Alley; SEA: Animax Asia
- Original run: October 5, 2012 – December 28, 2012
- Episodes: 13
Further information
Manga
K: Stray Dog Story
Written by	GoRA
Illustrated by	Yui Kuroe
Published by	Kodansha
Magazine	good! Afternoon
Original run	November 2012 – March 2013
Volumes	1
Manga
K: Days of Blue
Written by	GoRA
Illustrated by	Yui Kuroe
Published by	Kodansha
Magazine	Aria
Original run	November 5, 2013 – July 28, 2014
Volumes	2
Manga
K: The First
Written by	GoRA
Illustrated by	Rin Kimura
Magazine	GFantasy
Original run	December 18, 2013 – March 18, 2015
Manga
Gakuen K
Written by	GoRA
Illustrated by	Jirō Suzuki
Magazine	Monthly GFantasy
Original run	January 18, 2014 – January 18, 2016
Manga
K: Lost small world
Written by	GoRA
Illustrated by	Yoru Ōkita
Magazine	Hatsu Kiss
Original run	June 13, 2014 – June 13, 2016
Manga
K: Countdown
Written by	GoRA
Illustrated by	Yui Kuroe
Published by	Kodansha
Magazine	Aria
Original run	December 27, 2014 – July 28, 2015
Anime film
K: Missing Kings
Directed by	Shingo Suzuki; Hiromichi Kanazawa
Produced by	Haruki Hayashi
Written by	GoRA
Music by	Mikio Endō
Studio	GoHands
Licensed by	AUS: Crunchyroll; NA: Viz Media; UK: Anime Limited
Released	July 12, 2014
Runtime	73 minutes
Video game
Gakuen K: Wonderful School Days
Developer	Otomate
Publisher	Idea Factory
Genre	Visual novel
Platform	PlayStation Portable, PlayStation Vita
Released	PlayStation Portable; October 30, 2014; PlayStation Vita; October 22, 2015
Manga
K: Missing Kings
Written by	Hideyuki Furuhashi
Illustrated by	Haruto Shiota
Published by	Square Enix
Magazine	Monthly GFantasy
Original run	April 18, 2015 – August 18, 2015
Manga
K: Dream of Green
Written by	GoRA
Illustrated by	Yui Kuroe
Published by	Kodansha
Magazine	Aria
Original run	September 28, 2015 – February 28, 2016
Anime television series
K: Return of Kings
Directed by	Shingo Suzuki; Hiromichi Kanazawa
Produced by	Haruki Hayashi; Hiroshi Kamei; Kō Ōno
Written by	Yashichiro Takahashi (GoRA)
Music by	Mikio Endō
Studio	GoHands
Licensed by	AUS: Crunchyroll; NA: Viz Media; UK: Anime Limited
Original network	MBS, TBS, CBC, BS-TBS, AT-X
English network	SEA: Animax Asia
Original run	October 3, 2015 – December 26, 2015
Episodes	13
Manga
K: Return of Kings
Written by	Hideyuki Furuhashi
Illustrated by	Haruto Shiota
Published by	Square Enix
Magazine	Monthly GFantasy
Original run	October 17, 2015 – present
Anime film series
K: Seven Stories
Directed by	Shingo Suzuki
Produced by	Haruki Hayashi; Hitomi Saitō
Written by	Rei Rairaku (GoRA)
Music by	Mikio Endō
Studio	GoHands
Licensed by	AUS: Crunchyroll; NA: Viz Media; UK: Anime Limited
Released	July 7, 2018 – December 1, 2018
Runtime	59–66 minutes
Films	6
- icon

K (also called K Project) is a Japanese anime series created by the animation studio GoHands and GoRA, a group consisting of seven anonymous authors known as Kōhei Azano, Tatsuki Miyazawa, Yukako Kabei, Yashichiro Takahashi, Hideyuki Furuhashi, Suzu Suzuki, and Rei Rairaku. The series is directed by Shingo Suzuki, who also serves as its character designer. It began airing on MBS on October 5, 2012. The anime has been licensed by Viz Media in North America and by Madman Entertainment in Australia. The series is set when Japan is secretly being ruled by seven Kings of psychic clans called the Seven Clans of Color. Yashiro Isana, a seemingly normal student of Ashinaka High School, is targeted by HOMRA of the Red Clan and Scepter 4 of the Blue Clan, following the murder of pacifist Tatara Totsuka from HOMRA. With the help of a highly skilled swordsman named Kuroh Yatogami and a feline Strain with the ability of sensory interference named Neko, Yashiro rediscovers his true identity.

A manga prequel called K: Memory of Red, drawn by Yui Kuroe was serialized in Kodansha's Aria between May 28, 2012, and August 15, 2013. Another prequel manga, K: Stray Dog Story, ran in Kodansha's good! Afternoon between November 2012 and March 2013. A third manga K: Days of Blue, was serialized in Kodansha's Aria between November 2013 and July 2014, and a fourth, K: Countdown, ran in Aria from December 2014 to July 2015, while a fifth, K: Missing Kings, ran in Monthly GFantasy from April to August 2015. Five more manga series; K: The First, Gakuen K, K: Lost small world, K: Dream of Green, and K: Return of Kings, are also still ongoing. Furthermore, two light novels, called K Side:Blue and K Side:Red, were released in October and November 2012. A third light novel called K Side:Black and white was released in May 2013 and another one, K - Lost small world was released in April 2014.

A sequel film was released on July 12, 2014. A visual novel is also in development by Otomate.

A sequel anime project was announced on the official Twitter account of the series. The new anime series, K: Return of Kings, aired from October 3, 2015, to December 26, 2015, rounding up the anime series and delivering its ending.

A new anime project featuring an original story by GoRA and GoHands, titled K: Seven Stories, has been green-lit. GoHands and Shingo Suzuki are returning to produce and direct the anime, respectively.

== Plot ==
Yashiro Isana has lived a relatively ordinary, simple life. He lives in the technologically advanced Shizume City and attends Ashinaka High School, a notable high school that is located on an island just outside the areas. Yashiro is friendly with everyone. Nothing seems wrong about him, except perhaps his habit of forgetting where his school-issued PDA is. However, nothing normal has been happening since the recent murder of Tatara Totsuka, prominent member of the infamous HOMRA. No one knows who exactly killed him but the man responsible bears an uncanny, identical appearance to Yashiro. Seeking vengeance, the Red Clansmen of HOMRA set out to get Yashiro and kill him. Everyone suspects that Yashiro is the murderer.

== Media ==
=== Anime ===
The anime began airing on October 5, 2012. The anime has been licensed by Viz Media in North America and by Madman Entertainment in Australia. It was also being streamed on VizAnime video site. The opening theme song is "KINGS" by Angela and the ending theme song is "Tsumetai Heya, Hitori" (冷たい部屋、一人) by Mikako Komatsu. Insert songs include "Circle of Friends" by Yūki Kaji and "Itsuka no Zero Kara" (いつかのゼロから) by Angela. The anime has a movie sequel released in 2014. Viz has also licensed the second season.

=== Film ===
In May 2013, a sequel to the anime series in the form of a film was announced. The movie was released on July 12, 2014. Its title is "K: Missing Kings" and includes a new character Mishakuji Yukari. The movie takes place one year after anime in the summer. Viz Media has licensed the movie.

In April 2017, a six-part film series, titled "K: Seven Stories", was announced. and was released between July 7, 2018, and December 1, 2018. Viz Media has licensed the film series.

=== Light novels ===
No.	Title	Release date	ISBN
	K SIDE: BLUE	2012/10/18	978-4062838177
Author is Hideyuki Furuhashi (GoRA), illustrator is Shingo Suzuki (GoHands)
	K SIDE: RED	2012/11/15	978-4062838184
Author is Rei Rairaku (GoRA), illustrator is Shingo Suzuki (GoHands)
	K SIDE: BLACK & WHITE	2013/5/21	978-4062838320
Author is Tatsuki Miyazawa (GoRA), illustrator is Shingo Suzuki (GoHands)
	K -Lost Small World-	2014/4/2	978-4062838665
Author is Yukako Kabei (GoRA), illustrator is Shingo Suzuki (GoHands)

=== Manga ===
K -Memory of Red- (K-メモリー・オブ・レッド-)
Illustrated by Yui Kuroe, written by Rei Rairaku (GoRA). Spin-off that focuses on Homra. The story follows events that took place before the TV series.

No.	Release date	ISBN
1	2012/10/12	978-4063805963
001. Homra Part 1 (吠舞羅 (前編)); 002. Homra Part 2 (吠舞羅 (後編)); 003. Strange Love (ストレンジ・ラブ); 004. Memory Part 1 (Memory (前編)); 005. Memory Part 2 (Memory (後編))
2	2013/3/13	978-4063806205
006. Horse sashimi panic Part 1 (馬刺しパニック (前編)); 007. Horse sashimi panic Part 2 (馬刺しパニック (後編)); 008. Rainy Day; 009. Kamamoto of Summer (夏のKamamoto); 010. In the Crypt Part 1 (あなぐらの中 (前編))
3	2013/10/7	978-4063806526
011. In the Crypt Part 2 (あなぐらの中 (後編))); 012. The elegant day of King and Princess (王と姫の優雅な一日); 013. Summer Night Ghost (サマーナイトゴースト); 014. King (キング); 015. HAPPY BIRTHDAY; 016. After the sweet memory

K Stray Dog Story (K ストレイ・ドッグ・ストーリー)
Illustrated by Saki Minato, written by Tatsuki Miyazawa (GoRA). Spin-off that focuses on Kuroh Yatogami.

No.	Release date	ISBN
1	2013/4/5	978-4063878837

K -Days of Blue- (K-デイズ・オブ・ブルー-)
Illustrated by Yui Kuroe, written by Rei Rairaku (GoRA). Spin-off that focuses on Scepter 4. The story follows events that took place before the TV series.

No.	Release date	ISBN
1	2014/4/7	978-4063806878
001. (東京法務局戶籍課第四分室寮棟); 002. LONELY BABY; 003. (淡島の休日); 004. (痕); 005. (白あん煮込み豆腐パニック(前編))
2	2014/8/12	978-4063807134

K - The First
Illustrated by Rin Kimura, written by Suzu Suzuki (GoRA). Mainly a re-telling of the story in the TV series.
Gakuen K
Illustrated by Jirō Suzuki, written by Hideyuki Furuhashi (GoRA). Comedy spin-off where all the K characters are going to high school together.
K: Lost small world
Illustrated by Yoru Ōkita, written by Yukako Kabei (GoRA). Focuses on Yata's and Fushimi's past.
K: Countdown
Illustrated by Yui Kuroe, written by Rei Rairaku. The story reveals what happens after the Missing Kings movie from the viewpoints of different characters.
K: Missing Kings
Illustrated by Haruto Shiota, written by Hideyuki Furuhashi. K: Missing Kings is an adaptation of the film of the same name, and ran in the Monthly GFantasy magazine from April 18, 2015, to August 18, 2015.
K: Dog and Cat
Illustrated by Rin Kimura, written by Hideyuki Furuhashi. About Neko and Kuroh. The story takes place between the first season and the movie. Published in G-Fantasy between May 18 and November 18, 2015.
K: Dream of Green
Illustrated by Yui Kuroe, written by Rei Rairaku. Began publication in Aria on September 28, 2015.
K: Return of Kings
The K: Return of Kings manga is an adaptation of the anime television series of the same name, written by Hideyuki Furuhashi and illustrated by Haruto Shiota. It began serialization in the G Gantasy magazine on October 17, 2015.

=== Visual novel ===
A visual novel adaptation was developed by Otomate and subsequently released in 2014. The game is targeted towards a female audience, allowing the player to be the heroine of the story. The player takes on the role of an original character named Saya Konohana (木野花 沙耶, Konohana Saya) who does not show up in the anime. The objective of the game is to pursue one of the available heroes using the school as a setup.
