= Lala Satalin Deviluke =

Fictional character in the manga series To Love Ru

- To Love Ru character
- Lala as illustrated by Kentaro Yabuki
- First appearance: Manga: To Love Ru chapter 1: "The Girl Who Fell From the Sky"; Anime: To Love Ru episode 1: "The Girl Who Fell From the Sky"
- Created by: Saki Hasemi; Kentaro Yabuki
- Voiced by: Haruka Tomatsu (Japanese); Alexis Tipton (English)

In-universe information
- Family: Gid Lucion Deviluke (father); Sephie Michaela Deviluke (mother); Nana Astar Deviluke (younger sister); Momo Belia Deviluke (youngest sister)
- Significant others: Rito Yuki (fiancé)

Lala Satalin Deviluke (Japanese: ララ・サタリン・デビルーク, Hepburn: Rara Satarin Debirūku) is a fictional character of the manga series To Love Ru, created by Saki Hasemi and Kentaro Yabuki. In the series, Lala is an alien princess from the planet Deviluke who, to avoid marrying one of her marriage candidates, decides to run away from home to Earth, where she pretends to be in love with the human boy Rito Yuki to prevent marriage, but falls in love with him after misinterpreting a statement made by Rito to another girl.

In the anime adaptation, Lala is voiced by Haruka Tomatsu in Japanese, and by Alexis Tipton in the English version. Regarded as one of the most popular characters in To Love Ru, Lala has received mostly positive critical reception. Reviewers have complimented the character's personality and physical attractiveness, although her diminishing role in To Love Ru Darkness has been criticized.

== Characterization ==
=== Design ===
Lala is a highly attractive teenage girl with a curvaceous figure, long pink hair, and emerald green eyes. Her most distinguishing feature is her tail, which is long, thin, and ends with a heart-shaped tip; it extends down from the base of her back. Another feature is that she is almost always seen wearing a hair clip with thick black swirls circling once then pointing downward; this is her robot companion Peke, who actually forms the clothes Lala usually wears. At the beginning of the series, she is almost always seen in her costume robot Peke's "Dress Form", in what can only be described as an "enlarged version of Peke herself". Wanting to fit in more with the people of earth, she has Peke dress her in various earth clothing styles; she has also bought herself a large number of earth clothes to wear when Peke is out of energy. Lala is often idolized by other girls on school for her beautiful figure and one of the biggest busts on school. She is considered so attractive that is seen as a perfect beautie, which even make relatively normal-sized girls to feel inferior. Ironically, she is mostly oblivious to her appearance. According to her friend Risa Momioka, Lala's measurements are B89-W57-H87.

=== Personality ===
Lala is shown as a girl the same age as the other characters, but with a rather childish personality: she is impulsive and acts instinctively, without thinking about the possible consequences. However, Lala also has a positive side: her extroversion allows her to socialize easily and, together with her beauty, helps to make her very popular in school. She is very caring and generous and seems to have a need to make everyone she cares about happy, even those with whom she has no real relationship, all while showing an amazing level of compassion that goes beyond simply charity or help. She is also very naive about terrestrial culture and often makes highly dangerous mistakes by accident or serious communication failure. Over time, on the other hand, can be witness an evolution of Lala's character, due to the proximity to her fiancé Rito Yuki and his friends, which leads to a maturation, mainly from the sentimental point of view.

Since her first appearance, Lala has presented herself as a carefree girl and without any modesty: she does not disdain being naked in public or at home, nor appearing in front of Rito wearing little or nothing at all (typically, after a bath or upon awakening). Moreover, several times, as if it were a common thing, Lala asks Rito to bathe together, for the simple reason that on her planet Deviluke, she has always been bathed by maids, which is the reason why Lala has no notion of modesty.

=== Powers and abilities ===
Being a member of the Devilukian and Charmian alien races, Lala has superhuman strength, power and speed. She is also known in Deviluke for her genius-level intellect (to the point of being considered one of the most intelligent people in her galaxy), and has made inventions of all kinds. Lala's physical strength is pure brute force to the point where a punch can cause a shock wave and create a small crater in a wall without physical contact with it. She has also been shown to withstand heavy physical attacks (usually without being hurt); this is also important internally, as she can eat spicy food. One trait Lala inherited from her mother, Sephie Michaela Deviluke, is an enhanced metabolism; thanks to it, Lala can not gain weight. Like all citizens from Deviluke, Lala has a distinctive tail with a shape of a spade on the end that can shoot a destructive beam. Oddly, her tail is very sensitive, causing her friends to nickname it her "weakness" (since the tail of all female Devilukeans is more sensitive than that of a male), despite being able to shake someone with her tail by mustering enough strength.

Despite her childlike personality, Lala's intellect is perhaps one of her most remarkable abilities, being capable to create extraordinary inventions as well redesign other material objects; her planet even wanted to use it for weapons research and engineering. Lala usually creates a multitude of inventions throughout the whole series, most of them being seemingly childish and toy-like, with some of them having no original purpose aside from having fun. A running gag in the plot is that her inventions usually do not work as well as Lala and the others had hoped, often resulting in perverted accidents. So far, Lala's greatest creation is Peke.

== Appearances ==
=== In To Love Ru ===
As the first daughter of King Gid and Queen Sephie of Deviluke, Lala Satalin Deviluke was born the first princess of the planet Deviluke. She has two known siblings, the twins Nana and Momo, whom she is very close to. As a child, she was friends with the Memorze royal Run/Ren, though she seemed to prefer the female Run over the male Ren. As the first princess and presumed eventual successor to the throne of Deviluke, it appears that she must marry so that both she and her spouse can rule together. As such, she was continuously presented with male suitors, all of whom she has turned down. When she finally couldn’t take it any longer, she escaped from Deviluke and warped to Earth so that she could have some freedom and temporary safety.

While on the run, Lala randomly teleports naked to the bathtub of human teenage Rito Yuki while he is taking a bath. She introduces herself to him, and he reluctantly defends her from her pursuers. The next day, Rito meets with his school classmate Haruna Sairenji, the girl he is in love with. He shuts his eyes, bows his head, and finally confesses his love to her, only to open his eyes and finds Lala in front of him and receiving his confession, much to her delight. Lala goes along with it so she can stay on Earth, until her personal bodyguard Zastin arrives to bring her home. Lala hastily decides she wants to marry Rito to stay on Earth, much to his dismay, and Zastin proceeds to attack him. But after hearing Rito's speech about marriage only working if the two have feelings for each other, they both misinterpret his exact intention, believing that he truly understands Lala's feelings, and she truly falls in love with Rito and decides to marry him for real, which Zastin also ignorantly approves of.

Throughout the series, Lala helps Rito against her former fiancé candidates, and despite her antics, childish personality, and how often she likes to cling onto him, Rito's friendship with Lala develops, and their relationship becomes more stable and comfortable. As Lala and Haruna become closer friends, Haruna confesses that she is also in love with Rito, which Lala is strangely happy about. As Rito's relationship with girls changes progressively since Lala entered his life, upon reflecting on this, he realizes that he also fell in love with Lala as well. Later, he manages to tell Lala his feelings towards her and Haruna, which she is happy either way, explaining to him that when they marry, he would become King of Deviluke, and then Earth laws will not apply to him, making polygamy legal for Rito to marry both Lala and Haruna, so the former encourages Rito to confess to Haruna (knowing she has feelings for him but didn't tell him) so they can all be together. Unfortunately, Rito idiotically confesses once again blindly, and opens his eyes to find four other girls in front of him receiving his love confession, none of whom was Haruna.

=== In To Love Ru Darkness ===
In the sequel To Love Ru Darkness, Lala continues to support Rito and Haruna's relationship, all while trying to strengthen her own relationship with Rito. Lala's younger sister, Momo, who has also fallen in love with Rito, hopes that his marriage to Lala would open up the chance for other girls, including herself, to marry him as well; in order to accomplish this, Momo organizes the Harem Plan (which was originally proposed by Lala). Later in the series, Lala fights against Golden Darkness in an attempt to protect Rito from her. The battle climaxes with Golden Darkness creating a huge blade to kill Lala and take Rito with her. Ignoring Rito's advice to run, Lala instead holds him closer and asks him to stay with her, since if he is with her, she's able use her maximum strength. Lala manages to deflect Golden Darkness attack with her tail laser, but as a result of overusing her power, she is physically reduced to a childlike form, although Lala eventually returns to her original form.

=== In the anime ===
In the anime adaptation of To Love Ru, when Lala shows up in Rito's bathtub, he accidentally grabs her breasts, which, to his dismay, is considered a marriage proposal on the planet Deviluke, and to annul the engagement, Rito must grab Lala's breasts again within the time limit of three days, which he fails to do so. This detail about the marriage proposal via grabbing the woman's breasts exists only in the anime, and is not considered canon in the manga.

=== In other media ===
In addition to the anime and manga, Lala has appeared in five To Love Ru video games: To Love Ru: Exciting Outdoor School Version, To Love Ru: Exciting Beach School Version, To Love Ru: Darkness — Battle Ecstasy, To Love Ru: Darkness — Idol Revolution, and To Love Ru: Darkness — True Princess. Lala appears as a support character in the Weekly Shōnen Jump crossover fighting game J-Stars Victory VS. Lala also makes a cameo appearance in the eighth chapter of the manga adaptation of the light novel series Mayoi Neko Overrun!.

== Reception ==
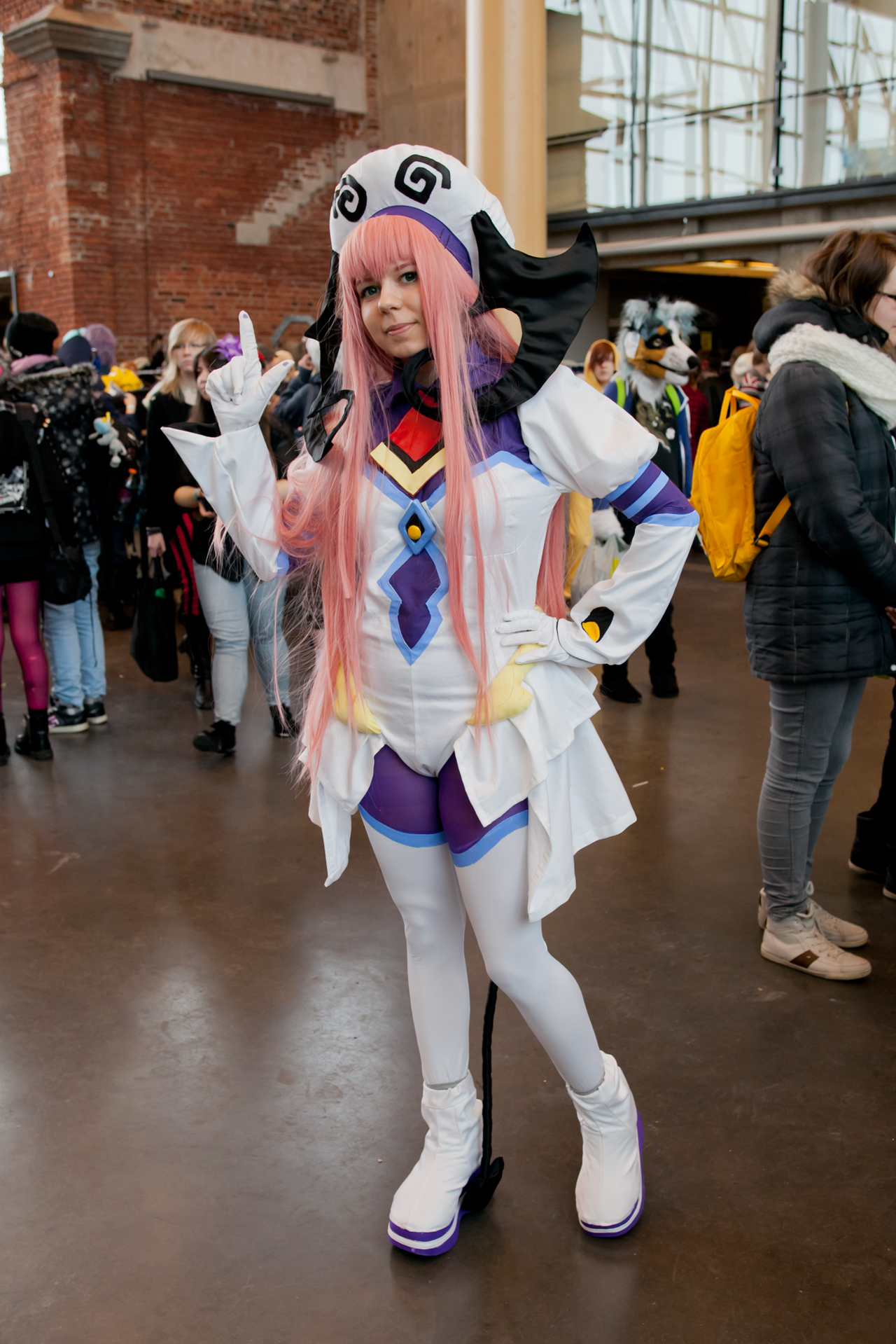
A cosplayer dressed as Lala

=== Popularity ===
Lala is one of the most popular characters of To Love Ru, with many female fan readers of the series frequently cosplaying as her. In the first popularity poll of To Love Ru, Lala ranked as the 1st most popular character by 5472 votes.^{[vol. 7:85 (ja)]}

The June 2015 issue of Shueisha's Jump Square magazine included the results of its popularity poll for the heroines of To Love-Ru Darkness. In the various categories presented, Lala ranked 2nd as "which character would you want to be your friend?" and "which character would you want to switch bodies with for just one day?", and 3rd as "which character would you want to be your girlfriend (or wife)?", "which character would you want to be in your family (but not as a wife/girlfriend)?" and "which character would be your favorite if all the heroines were in an idol group?". In the same year, Jump Square presented the results of another popularity poll for the female characters of To Love-Ru Darkness in the October issue; this time Lala ranked 4th as "which character would you want to be your girlfriend (or wife)?" and "which character would you want to be in your family?", 6th as "which character would be your favorite if all the heroines were in an idol group?" and "which character would you want to switch bodies with for just one day?", and 8th as "which character would you want to be your friend?".

=== Critical response ===
Reviewing To Love Ru, THEM Anime Reviews called Lala cute and likable, but "a little grating at times". In another review, it is noted how moving her younger sister Momo forward in the cast also has taken Lala largely out of the picture, and that her few appearances in the series are just to add fan service; then she is sent back to obscurity, which, according to THEM, "It's kind of a shame, because Lala really IS a nice person".

In a review for To Love Ru, Theron Martin, from Anime News Network, called Lala an "irrepressibly cheery airhead", while also complimenting her as a "damn fine-looking naked", saying the series gives ample opportunities to appreciate that, in addition to outright declaring Lala the sexiest girl in the series. In a later review for To Love Ru Darkness, Martin said that Lala as the female lead was "undeniably fun to watch", commenting on how her bubbly personality and gorgeous curves delicately balanced her sexy innocence, airheaded genius, and childlike exuberance with a more mature romanticism. However, Martin also criticized the fragility of that balance, pointing out the necessity of keeping it on a comedic focus also left virtually no room for character development.

== See also ==
- List of To Love Ru characters
