= Momo Belia Deviluke =

Fictional character in the manga series To Love Ru

- To Love Ru character
- Momo as illustrated by Kentaro Yabuki
- First appearance: Manga: To Love Ru chapter 97: "Trouble Quest 5" (2008); Anime: To Love Ru OVA 4: "Trouble Quest" (2009)
- Created by: Saki Hasemi; Kentaro Yabuki
- Voiced by: Aki Toyosaki (Japanese); Natalie Rial (English)

In-universe information
- Full name: Momo Belia Deviluke
- Alias: Third Princess of Deviluke
- Species: Devilukean
- Gender: Female
- Family: Gid Lucion Deviluke (father); Sephie Michaela Deviluke (mother); Lala Satalin Deviluke (older sister); Nana Astar Deviluke (older twin sister)

Momo Belia Deviluke (Japanese: モモ・ベリア・デビルーク, Hepburn: Momo Beria Debirūku) is a fictional character in the manga series To Love Ru, created by Saki Hasemi and Kentaro Yabuki. In the series, Momo is Lala Satalin Deviluke's younger sister and the younger twin sister to Nana Astar Deviluke, with Momo as the most mischievous of the three. Both twins flee to Earth to escape their studies on their home planet Deviluke. While Nana is able to communicate with animals, Momo has the unique ability to speak to plants.

Although initially featured as a recurring secondary character in the original To Love Ru series, Momo becomes one of the main female protagonists in the sequel To Love Ru Darkness, in which she plots to build (and be part of) a harem of girls around protagonist Rito Yuki, for whom she deeply falls in love with.

== Characterization ==
Like her sisters, Momo also has pink hair (but much shorter than theirs). Unlike her twin sister Nana, she has a much sweeter, more friendly and calculating personality, but when she gets angry, she is the most terrifying and sadistic of the three sisters, completely changing her character and the way of doing things. Momo is highly intelligent (although less than Lala) and is an expert in the field of extraterrestrial plants. She has a much more mature mentality in some respects, especially when it comes to sex, than her sisters. Similar to Nana, Momo loves to dress in a Gothic Lolita style, albeit her attire generally consists of black and green colours, as contrary to her sister's, which is of black and red. Among other things, Momo's tail is particularly sensitive, so much so that it can weaken her at the mere touch of a person, in addition to provoking arousal in her (in fact, Momo sometimes touches her tail to vent her own instincts).

== Appearances ==
=== In To Love Ru ===
As the daughter of King Gid and Queen Sephie of Deviluke, an alien planet far distant from Earth, Momo, the younger sister of Lala Satalin Deviluke and twin of Nana Astar Deviluke, holds the title of "Third Princess of Deviluke", as she is the youngest of the three sisters. Since childhood, Momo and Nana always argued. Whenever they fought, Lala would always find ways for the twins to reconcile and for Zastin (Lala's personal bodyguard) not to be angry with them. At some point in time before the events of the series, Momo travelled through the galaxy and met tons of plants from different worlds, befriending all of them due to her ability to communicate with them.

Momo, alongside Nana, makes her first appearance in the manga in chapter 97 of To Love Ru, in which the twins arrive on Earth and transport basically the entire cast of the manga into a RPG world inside Trouble Quest, a virtual reality game that Momo and Nana programmed and used to determine whether Rito Yuki is worthy of being engaged to Lala or not. In the end, after everyone exits Trouble Quest, the twins apologize to Lala for all the problems they caused before returning to Deviluke. A few chapters later, they went back to Earth after escaping from Deviluke and their studies. However, they forgot that Zastin was also staying on Earth, who was instructed by their father to bring them back home. In the end, they defeat Zastin and his assistants, and convince their father that they are going to stay on Earth with Lala.

During Momo and Nana's stay at the Yuki household, they created their own house in the attic using space distortion technology. They also take care of all their necessities to avoid disturbing Rito's younger sister, Mikan Yuki, for cooking, cleaning, etc. However, they still come down sometimes to eat Mikan's cooking. Throughout the series, Momo gradually develops affectionate feelings for Rito despite him being the fiancé of her sister Lala. She often fantasizes perverted situations with Rito, and desires for him to become sexually active towards her. Momo would constantly sneak into Rito's room to sleep with him, sometimes even half-naked, revealing Momo's lustful side. Whenever she is asked of the situation, she simply says that she accidentally gets into Rito's room while she is half asleep. Momo has also stated that she knows Rito would not reciprocate her feelings, and that she is content just to be a lover.

=== In To Love Ru Darkness ===
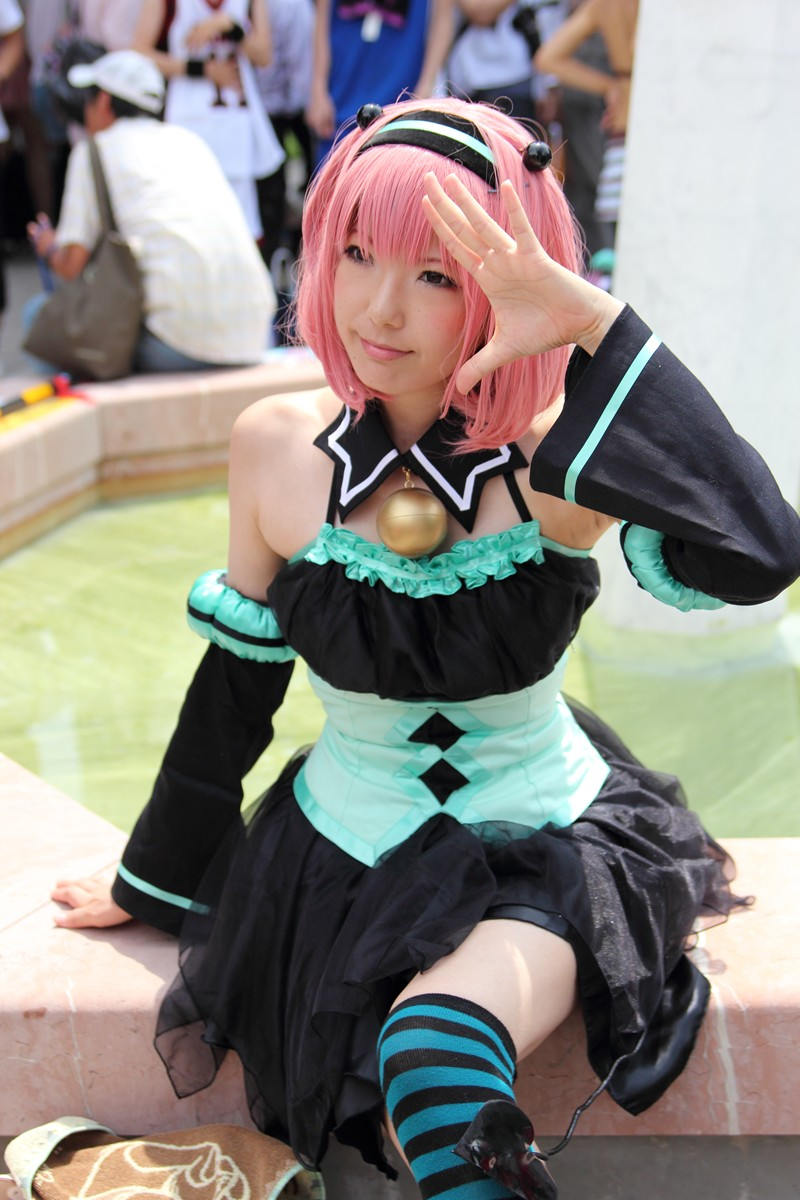
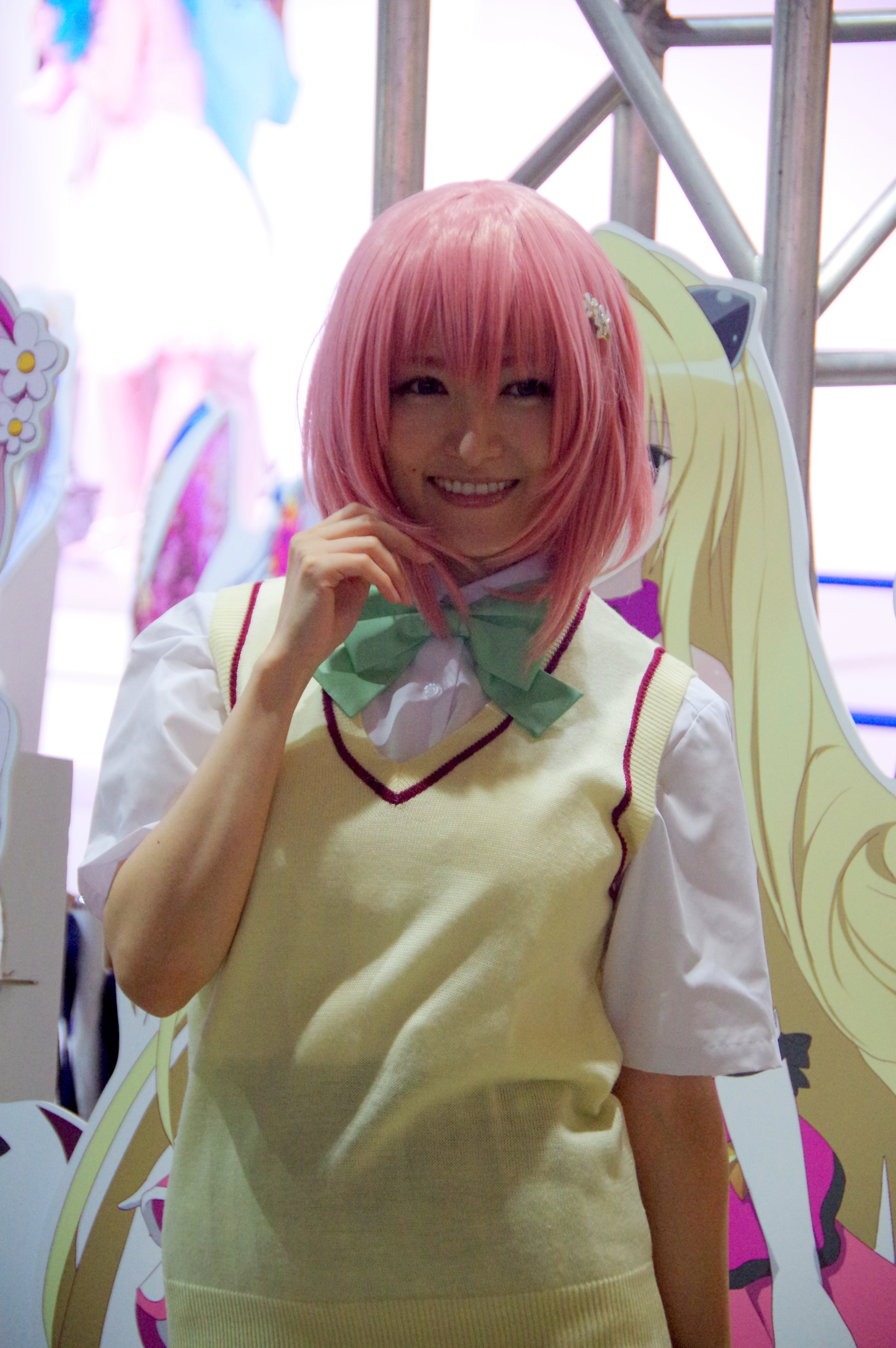
Two cosplayers dressed as Momo at Comiket in 2012 (left) and Tokyo Game Show in 2014 (right).

In To Love Ru Darkness, Momo takes over the role of the main female protagonist alongside Golden Darkness. Wanting Rito's love, but unwilling to cause conflict between Lala or Haruna, Momo realizes that if Rito becomes the next King of Deviluke, the laws of Earth will not apply to him, allowing Rito to create a harem where she can display her affections openly. To accomplish this, Momo organizes the Harem Plan (ハーレム計画, Haremu Keikaku), a plan originally proposed by Lala to ensure that each and every girl who is in love with Rito can marry him. The first phase of the plan is for Momo to enter Sainan High as a student so she can monitor Rito and the female characters closely, while the second phase is to turn Rito into a "carnivore" so that he would take it upon himself to create a harem. To do this, Momo manipulates various circumstances involving Rito and the female characters so that they end up in a romantic situation.

So far, herself, Lala, Haruna, Nana, Mikan (despite being Rito's sister), Darkness, Yui Kotegawa, Run Elise Jewelria and Rin Kujou are part of the Harem Plan, with Saki Tenjouin, Risa Momioka, Mio Sawada, Mea Kurosaki, Kyouko Kirisaki, Tearju Lunatique and Sayaka Arai under consideration to be part of the plan but, it's still unofficial as to whether or not they'll be part of the plan in the end. As of the present time, Momo's Harem Plan is gradually taking effect as Rito, who initially rejected the idea, is slowly beginning to consider it. Throughout the manga, Momo continuously tries to find ways to make every girl around Rito fall for him as part of the Harem Plan. She would sometimes buy love simulation games as part of her research for the plan, which she uses to set the mood for him and a certain girl he's with or even when it's her. She hopes that one day Rito might return her love as well as the love of every girl who has feelings for him. After her mother, Sephie, comes to visit them, Momo hopes she doesn't find out about the Harem Plan, but after a brief moment with Rito, Sephie quickly realizes that her daughter is not only planning a harem for Rito but also hoping to be a part of that. Much to Momo's shock, Sephie tells her that she's fine with Momo trying to get what she wants as long as her heart is fine with it.

Ever since her talk with her mother, Momo has expressed doubts about whether she would be satisfied with the Harem Plan. Most notably, when she learns that Rito and Haruna accidentally kissed each other, instead of becoming happy and enthusiastic like she would whenever Rito gets development with the other girls, Momo becomes worried, restless and uneasy; she feels like a loser, much to her own surprise. Despite this, she pushes Rito to finally confess to Haruna. When Momo watches as Rito and Haruna's attempts to confess to each other once again went nowhere, Momo somehow feels relieved. However, after Lala reaffirms her own love for Rito and satisfaction in receiving love from him despite his love for Haruna, Momo also reaffirms her own satisfaction to receive his love and restores her resolve to resume the Harem Plan.

=== In other media ===
In addition to the anime and manga, Momo has appeared in four To Love Ru video games: To Love Ru Darkness — Battle Ecstasy, To Love Ru Darkness — Idol Revolution, To Love Ru Darkness — True Princess, and To Love Ru Darkness: Gravure Chance. Momo also makes a cameo appearance in the third chapter of the manga adaptation of the light novel series Mayoi Neko Overrun!.

== Reception ==
=== Popularity ===
The June 2015 issue of Shueisha's Jump Square magazine included the results of its popularity poll for the heroines of To Love-Ru Darkness. In the various categories presented, Momo ranked 1st as "which character would be your favorite if all the heroines were in an idol group?", 2nd as "which character would you want to be your girlfriend (or wife)?", 3rd as "which character would you want to be your friend?", and 4th as "which character would you want to be in your family (but not as a wife/girlfriend)?" and "which character would you want to switch bodies with for just one day?". In the same year, Jump Square presented the results of another popularity poll for the female characters of To Love-Ru Darkness in the October issue; this time Momo ranked 6th as "which character would you want to be your girlfriend (or wife)?" and "which character would you want to be in your family?", 7th as "which character would be your favorite if all the heroines were in an idol group?", and 10th as "which character would you want to be your friend?".

=== Critical response ===
In a review for To Love Ru Darkness, Theron Martin, from Anime News Network, called Momo "conniving" and "calculating", and noted how she effectively becomes the lead female protagonist of the series, which led Lala and Haruna to be relegated to a "mere ensemble supporting status", with both making little more than cameo appearances in many episodes. Martin also said, "Momo is the driving force of the series in terms of both personality and pushing things to happen. And that changes the tenor of the first several episodes. She comes on to Rito like an adult seductress, one whose plays are certainly not innocent and whose schemes are designed to promote lustful scenarios both with her and with other girls she sees as potential harem candidates. Along the way she gradually starts to realize her own feelings towards Rito may go beyond just a play for position, and watching her trying to sort out her actual motivations for forming the harem gives the series a bit more depth than one might expect." In another review for Darkness, Martin stated that Momo's ongoing introspection about what she's doing with the Harem Plan has become "less critical", but still "meaty enough" to maintain her role as co-protagonist with Rito.

== See also ==
- List of To Love Ru characters
