= Nana Astar Deviluke =

Fictional character in the manga series To Love Ru

- To Love Ru character
- Nana as illustrated by Kentaro Yabuki
- First appearance: Manga: To Love Ru chapter 97: "Trouble Quest 5" (2008); Anime: To Love Ru OVA 4: "Trouble Quest" (2009)
- Created by: Saki Hasemi; Kentaro Yabuki
- Voiced by: Kanae Itō (Japanese); Allison Sumrall (English)

In-universe information
- Full name: Nana Astar Deviluke
- Alias: Second Princess of Deviluke
- Species: Devilukean
- Gender: Female
- Family: Gid Lucion Deviluke (father); Sephie Michaela Deviluke (mother); Lala Satalin Deviluke (older sister); Momo Belia Deviluke (younger twin sister)

Nana Astar Deviluke (Note: Japanese: ナナ・アスタ・デビルーク, Hepburn: Nana Asuta Debirūku) is a fictional character in the manga series To Love Ru, created by Saki Hasemi and Kentaro Yabuki. In the series, Nana is an alien princess from the distant planet Deviluke who possesses the unique ability to communicate with different animal species. She is the younger sister of Lala Satalin Deviluke and the older twin sister of Momo Belia Deviluke. Of the entire female cast of To Love Ru, Nana appears to be the least attracted to the protagonist Rito Yuki, although she eventually develops romantic feelings for him as the series progresses.

== Appearances ==
Nana Astar Deviluke has the appearance of a teenage girl with purple eyes and long pink hair, which she usually wears in pigtails on the sides of her head. However, she sometimes loosens her braids, such as after a shower or when she is wearing casual clothes. Like all members of the Devilukean alien species, Nana also has a long black tail on the back that, like her sisters, ends with a heart-shaped tip. Another interesting feature in Nana is that she has a sharp tusk on the left side of the upper teeth. Regarding her clothing style, Nana loves to dress in a Gothic Lolita style, with her attires generally consisting of black and red colours. Also, Nana's height is 151 cm, her weight is 43 kg, and her three sizes are B68-W54-H77.

=== In To Love Ru ===
As the daughter of King Gid and Queen Sephie of Deviluke, an alien planet far distant from Earth, Nana is an alien princess who holds the title of "Second Princess of Deviluke" as a member of Deviluke's royal family, she being the younger sister of Lala Satalin Deviluke and the older twin sister of Momo Belia Deviluke. At some point in time before the series' events, Nana travels across the galaxy and meets tons of animal species from different alien worlds, befriending all of them, thanks to her ability to communicate with animals, and then collecting them into an alien device called D-Dial, (Note: D-ダイヤル, D-daiyaru) which has the appearance of a mobile phone, but it is able to summon animals from a virtual space within it.

Nana, alongside Momo, makes her first appearance in the 97th chapter of the To Love Ru manga, in which the twins arrive on Earth and transport basically the entire cast of the manga into a RPG world inside Trouble Quest, a virtual reality game programmed by Nana and Momo and that they use to determine whether Rito Yuki is worthy of being engaged to Lala or not. In the end, after everyone exits Trouble Quest, the twins apologize to Lala for all the problems they caused before returning to Deviluke. A few chapters later, Nana and Momo flee from Deviluke in an attempt to avoid their studies. The twins escape to Earth, where they teleport naked to Rito's bathroom at the exact moment he was there, and Nana consequently beats him up for seeing her and her sister undressed. Zastin then shows up and, instructed by Nana and Momo's father to bring them home, chases them to a bridge where they use their D-Dials to summon various dangerous animals and plants to attack Zastin. In the end, the twins defeat Zastin and convince their father that they are going to stay on Earth with Lala.

During Nana and Momo's stay at the Yuki household, they create their own house in the attic by remodeling it using space distortion technology; they also take care of all their necessities to avoid disturbing Rito's younger sister, Mikan Yuki, for cooking, cleaning, and other needs. Unlike the other female characters in To Love Ru, who are all in love with Rito, Nana seems to be the least attracted to him. However, she unconsciously develops affectionate feelings for Rito throughout the series, although she consciously dislikes him and thinks of him as nothing more than a pervert. As a result of her suppression of emotions, Nana often dreams of Rito advancing sexually towards her, to which she reacts by shouting "You beast!" in her sleep. At the end of the series, in an attempt to confess his love for his classmate and longtime crush Haruna Sairenji, Rito fails and, instead, his confession is accidentally directed to Nana and three other girls: Yui Kotegawa, Run Elise Jewelria, and Ryouko Mikado.

=== In To Love Ru Darkness ===
In the manga continuation of To Love Ru, titled To Love Ru Darkness, Nana becomes a Sainan High student at Momo's urging. There, Nana manages to make friends with a girl in her school class named Mea Kurosaki. Eventually, the friendship between them, which strengthens over time, becomes one of the main focuses of the manga's plot. Ultimately, Mea exposes her true identity as an alien assassin and living weapon to Nana, which leaves her confused and petrified by the revelation of her friend's true form. Nana is then left heartbroken and traumatized by Mea's statement that their friendship has never been real and that she wants to stop "playing" being friends with Nana.

Depressed by the end of the friendship with Mea, Nana tells in a conversation with Rito that she still wants to help Mea and that despite her efforts, Nana feels that Mea never saw her as a friend and was just playing with her. Embraced by Rito, Nana is assured by him that she and Mea can still be reconciled. Feeling confident, Nana finds Mea and confronts her. Mea, fixed on her identity as a living weapon, tries to keep Nana away by attacking her. A fight ensues between the two ex-friends, with Mea explaining to Nana in detail why they cannot be together and Nana refuting her reasoning, stating that regardless of her identity, only the feelings matter in. Mea, beginning to understand Nana's words and feelings, ends the fight by accepting Nana's request to be friends again. Shortly thereafter, due to Rito's encouragement, Nana's romantic feelings for him grow to such an extent that. On a night when she is unable to sleep, Nana remembers the warmth of Rito's embrace and decides to sneak into bed with him, only to find that Momo, as usual, is already there sleeping with Rito, and Nana, mistaking the situation, starts beating him up.

=== In other media ===
In the anime adaptations of To Love Ru, Nana is voiced by Kanae Itō in Japanese, while Allison Sumrall dubs her in the English version.

In addition to both the manga and anime series, Nana also appears in three To Love Ru video games: To Love Ru: Darkness — Battle Ecstasy, To Love Ru: Darkness — Idol Revolution, and To Love Ru: Darkness — True Princess.

== Reception ==
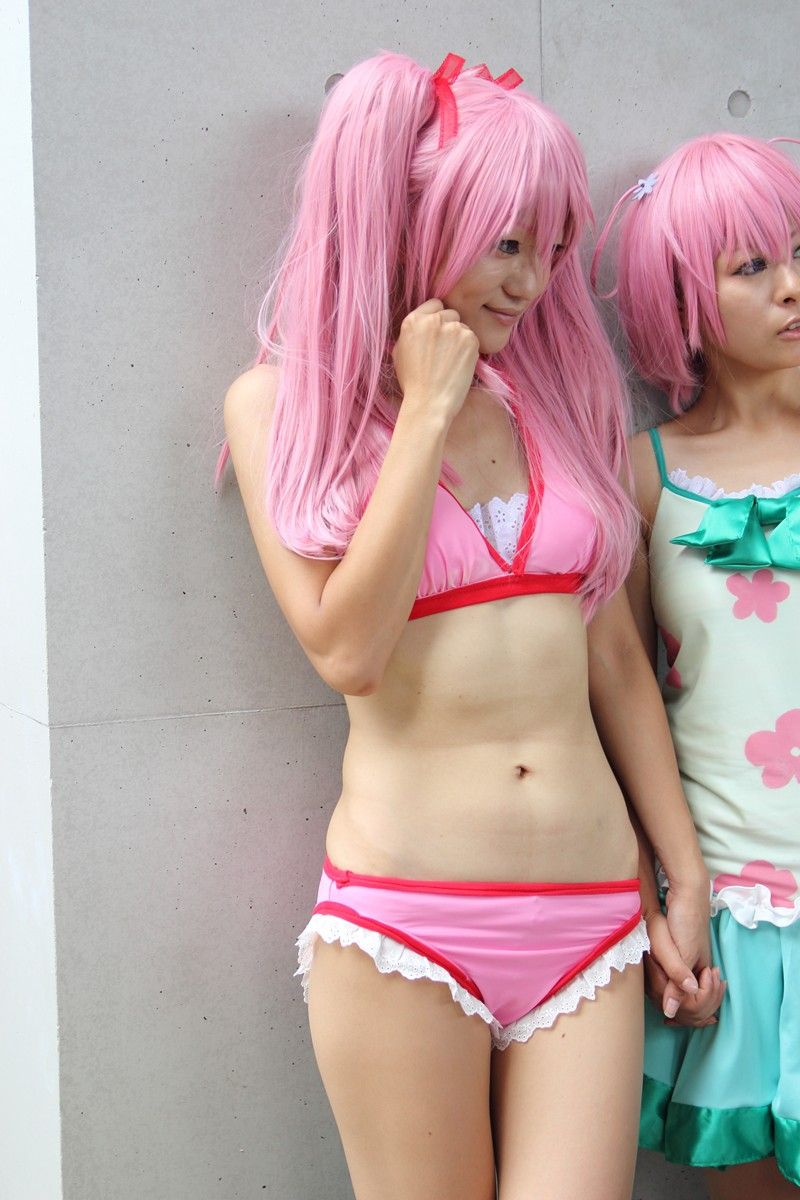
A cosplayer dressed as Nana (center), next to another cosplayer dressed as Momo (right).

=== Popularity ===
Ever since her introduction, the character of Nana has become a popular subject of cosplay, causing a trend in Japan where female fan readers of the To Love Ru series attempt to replicate her iconic look.

In 2015, the June issue of Shueisha's Jump Square magazine included the results of its popularity poll for the heroines of To Love-Ru Darkness. In the various categories presented, Nana ranked 6th place as "which character would you want to be in your family (but not as a wife/girlfriend)?"; 7th place as "which character would you want to be your girlfriend (or wife)?", "which character would you want to be your friend?" and "which character would be your favorite if all the heroines were in an idol group?"; and 9th place as "which character would you want to switch bodies with for just one day?".

In August 2015, Jump Square presented the results of another popularity poll for the female characters of To Love-Ru Darkness in the October 2014 issue, for which Nana ranked 1st place as "which character would you want to be your friend?"; 5th place as "which character would you want to be in your family?"; and 9th place as "which character would you want to be your girlfriend (or wife)?" and "which character would be your favorite if all the heroines were in an idol group?".

=== Critical response ===
In a review for Motto To Love Ru, Theron Martin of Anime News Network (ANN) stated, "Nana and Momo explain enough about themselves over the course of this series that viewers who have not seen the OVAs will eventually be able to piece together who the twins are and what they're about." Reviewing the anime adaptation of To Love Ru Darkness, Martin noted Nana's expanded role in the series. In a later review for the second season of To Love Ru Darkness, titled To Love Ru Darkness 2nd, Martin complimented Nana's development in the anime as "in-depth and satisfying", in addition to saying that "Nana efforts to win Mea over as a friend [are] a key part of the storyline."

=== Merchandise ===
A 1/4 scale figure of the character Nana wearing a green bunny girl suit was released in Japan in August 2019 for the price of 21,111 yen (excluding taxes). In May 2021, the Good Smile Company announced the release of a scale figure of Nana wearing a pink swimsuit. The product stands 180mm tall and is available for pre-order with a price tag of 3,900 yen and a release date scheduled for July 2021.

== See also ==
- List of To Love Ru characters
