= Hasemi =

Hasemi (written: 長谷見) is a Japanese surname. Notable people with the surname include:

- Masahiro Hasemi (長谷見 昌弘) (born 1945), Japanese racing driver
- Saki Hasemi (長谷見 沙貴), Japanese manga artist
