= Mayoi Neko Overrun! =

Japanese novel series

- Cover of the first light novel, featuring Fumino Serizawa

迷い猫オーバーラン! (Mayoi Neko Ōbāran!)
- Genre: Romantic comedy
- Light novel
- Written by: Tomohiro Matsu
- Illustrated by: Peco (vol.1-9); Yasu (vol.10); Hekiru Hikawa (vol.11); Misato Mitsumi (vol.12)
- Published by: Shueisha
- Imprint: Super Dash Bunko
- Original run: October 24, 2008 – February 24, 2012
- Volumes: 12
- Manga
- Written by: Tomohiro Matsu
- Illustrated by: Kentaro Yabuki
- Published by: Shueisha
- Magazine: Jump SQ. Jump SQ.19
- Original run: January 4, 2010 – October 4, 2010
- Volumes: 2
- Anime television series
- Directed by: Shin Itagaki (Episode 1); Kenichi Yatagai (Episode 2); Yoshimasa Hiraike (Episode 3); Akitarō Daichi (Episode 4); Michio Fukuda (Episode 5) Takashi Ikehata (Episode 6); Rion Kujo (Episode 7); Manabu Ono (Episode 8); Tomohiro Hirata (Episode 9); Takuya Satō (Episode 10); Keizō Kusakawa (Episode 11); Junichi Sato (Episode 12)
- Produced by: Jun Fukuda; Kazuhiko Hasegawa; Masaya Shinozaki; Nobuhiro Nakayama; Tomoyuki Ōwada
- Written by: Tomohiro Matsu
- Music by: Ryuji Takagi
- Studio: AIC
- Original network: Tokyo MX, Sun TV, BS11
- Original run: April 6, 2010 – June 29, 2010
- Episodes: 13 + 6 specials

Mayoi Neko Overrun! (Japanese: 迷い猫オーバーラン!, Hepburn: Mayoi Neko Ōbāran!; "Stray Cat Overrun!") is a Japanese light novel series written by Tomohiro Matsu. Twelve volumes were published by Shueisha between 2008 and 2012 under their Super Dash Bunko imprint. The first nine feature illustrations by Peco, with Yasu, Hekiru Hikawa, and Misato Mitsumi then illustrating one each. "Mayoi Neko" translates as "Stray Cats", referring to the name of the cafe around which the story develops, and alluding to the orphans and other "stray" characters who collect there. It is also the name of a school club for helping people in the story.

The Mayoi Neko Overrun! novels have sold over two million copies. A manga adaptation by Kentaro Yabuki was serialized in Shueisha's Jump SQ. and Jump SQ.19 magazines from January 4 to October 4, 2010. An anime television series adaptation animated by AIC aired on Tokyo MX and BS11 from April 6 to June 29, 2010.

== Plot ==
The story revolves around Takumi Tsuzuki, who spends his days with his childhood friend Fumino Serizawa at the cafe called "Stray Cats", and with his friends, in the Umenomori Academy. One day, his older stepsister Otome brings home a strange girl named Nozomi Kiriya to live with them. When his other friend Chise Umenomori starts a Stray Cats Club that helps people, Takumi's life is filled with new activities.

== Characters ==
=== Main ===
Takumi Tsuzuki (都築 巧, Tsuzuki Takumi)
Voiced by: Nobuhiko Okamoto (adult); Minako Kotobuki (child)
The protagonist of the story, he is the adopted younger brother of Otome Tsuzuki. He was found as a baby, abandoned on a tatami mat, and was named Takumi by the orphanage. He used to live in the same orphanage as Fumino, until it closed down. He ran away from the orphanage and was found by Otome, and they subsequently became family. He is usually in charge of the Stray Cats patisserie, as Otome is often absent from the shop. He is childhood friends with Fumino, and is the only person who knows what Fumino's words usually mean. He's a relatively nice person but is very oblivious to the other girls' feelings for him, especially Fumino's.
Fumino Serizawa (芹沢 文乃, Serizawa Fumino)
Voiced by: Kanae Itō
One of the main heroines of the story, she is the childhood friend of Takumi, and has been with him ever since they were both in the orphanage. She is beautiful but has a habit of meaning entirely the opposite of what she usually thinks; a fact only Takumi seems to be aware of. It was revealed that Takumi was the unwitting inspiration for this habit. She works at the Stray Cats as a part-time job just so she could be with Takumi even after he was adopted by Otome.
When she's angry, she tends to shout "Die twice!" (or occasionally, "Die ten thousand times!") to any poor soul who incurred her wrath. In addition, Takumi (and occasionally Ieyasu) is the unfortunate recipient of much of her violent outbursts; ironically it being him who taught her that. She also beats up Takumi when the two of them end up in close proximity with each other by accident, out of embarrassment. As such, her behavior resembles a typical tsundere.
She has a crush on Takumi, and is frequently teased about it by her good friend, Kanae. She developed feelings for Takumi because he used to protect her from being bullied from when they were still at the orphanage together, and his kind nature. However, she dislikes his obliviousness towards her feelings, and once questioned to herself what did the other girls like about him. She confesses to Takumi in a panic, and leaves Takumi somewhat hanging on the credibility of what she had said, stating both love and hate towards him. Fumino's parents died in an accident, leaving her orphaned. She is also shown to be extremely jealous when Takumi gets along well with other girls, and if they try to get Takumi to go along with their plans, she will come up with a lie on the spot to prevent them from monopolizing him.
She is easily embarrassed, and can get worked up if someone even suggests that she cares for them. To hide this, she normally comes up with unrealistic lies to hide her concern for anyone (or her feelings for Takumi). She also has a strong, decisive character which normally tends to show up in tense situations. She has few friends due to her brash, abrasive character, and at the beginning of the story, her only friends were Takumi and Kanae, although gradually, she makes more friends with the likes of Nozomi and Chise becoming an important part of her life.
Chise Umenomori (梅ノ森 千世, Umenomori Chise)
Voiced by: Yuka Iguchi
The heiress of the Umenomori family and one of the main heroines. Though her family is wealthy, she is isolated by its prominence and her parents' absence. Her parents are normally busy at work and almost never around (it was over a year since she last saw them), so she lives through every single day without feeling the warmth of a family. Thus, Chise is spiritually and emotionally orphaned, yet another "stray cat" in need of a home. She is a typical spoiled rich girl who uses her great wealth and authority to get whatever she wants, and is the chief instigator of the sports festival competition between the spats and bloomers factions in volume 2.
She has the appearance of a beautiful elementary school girl, but is actually a high-schooler the same age as Fumino and Takumi. She looks upon Takumi as her servant and has a strange desire for him to let her hold his hand (the reason for this was apparently due to how Takumi had helped her up when they first met) as well as (along with Nozomi) to pat on her head. She has a clash of personalities with Fumino, and the two girls end up bickering whenever they are within the vicinity of each other, usually requiring Takumi to intervene and put an end to the disagreement. However, as the story progressed, their endless bickering gradually became a sign of closer friendship.
She harbours a crush on Takumi because he was the first person to act totally oblivious to her status as the heir to the Umenomori family and to treat her normally. This, coupled with her loneliness, caused her to have a secret desire to join Takumi's circle of friends although she feels that a reason is required so as not to appear too abrupt.
To get around this problem, she decides to create a club and forcefully ropes in Takumi and his friends as members. When Takumi mentioned his after school job, she offers to buy every cake at the Stray Cats, hoping that Takumi and his friends can attend the club and keep her company. Takumi later refuses to sell her any cakes, telling her that it is meaningless to sell cakes like that and persuades her to try her hand at making a cake so as to understand why. Chise ends up making a passable attempt at baking a cake and subsequently decides to start working at the Stray Cats while Takumi and his friends also join her club. Later the club was named Stray Cats Associates Club (迷い猫同好会, Mayoi Neko Dōkō Kai), whose primary purpose is to help others in need. Compared to Fumino and Nozomi, Chise is much more open with her feelings for Takumi and would go through far greater lengths just to be with Takumi, much to the ire of Fumino.
She is often seen with her two maids and an elderly butler who deeply care for her.
Nozomi Kiriya (霧谷 希, Kiriya Nozomi)
Voiced by: Ayana Taketatsu
A beautiful and mysterious girl Otome picked up at the train station on the way home. Also one of the main heroines. She arrived at the Stray Cats, not revealing anything about herself but her name. She normally tends to be indifferent and emotionless, but also seems to be a little airheaded.
She has a tendency to say "Nya~", much like a cat, complete with mimicry. Her hairstyle also oddly resembles a pair of cat ears. She transfers to Umenomori Gakuen, with some intervention from Chise, and ends up in the same class as Fumino and Takumi. She is a genius originally from Murasame Gakuen (村雨学園), a school/research center which gathers orphans who show great potential, and educate and develop their underlying potential, but because she was the best she would often be used by the teachers as an example which would cause the students grief. She is good in studies, sports and the piano, and when she was learning how to make a cake from Otome, she did it perfectly on her first try, and was appointed the new patisserie of Stray Cats. Nozomi, according to Takumi, also scored the highest in a practice exam at school. Additionally, in the anime, she is shown to be able to fix a television as well, despite the fact that she probably has not fixed one before, as well as singlehandedly winning a sports competition.
In the anime, she was something more of an unseen character for the first episode, often just parts of her were shown on screen and was referred to as a large cat to people who got a glimpse of her. However, she wasn't fully seen till the end, when Otome showed her to them.

=== Supporting ===
Otome Tsuzuki (都築 乙女, Tsuzuki Otome)
Voiced by: Satomi Satō
The owner of the Stray Cats store, and the person who adopted Takumi. She has a tendency to be away from the shop frequently because she likes to help people the best she can, even if she has to go to the ends of the world to do it. This usually leaves the store with nothing to sell at times. She is able to accomplish many of her good acts thanks to the efforts of Chise. Otome's personality is described as reckless, by Takumi and Fumino. She is surprisingly clumsy at making cakes, and is not very good at it, despite being the owner of Stray Cats. The reason her business stays afloat is because many of the guys like to see her, due to her beauty. She is also known to be a celebrity around town, mainly for her heroic exploits.
Later, it was revealed that Otome herself was an orphan adopted by the Tsuzuki family, and her desire to help others were mostly an influence from her foster parents, who died in an accident when Takumi was in junior high. While Otome behaves frequently like an air-headed child, she is unusually perceptive about the people she meets, and can easily see through others if they are experiencing trouble of some sorts. A running joke involving her is the fact that since she has a large bust, there are not a lot of swimsuits that can fit thus the top tends to break. She often hugs Takumi into them as well, giving him plenty of sisterly affection which makes the other girls (who are jealous of her bust) annoyed. Moreover, she is apt to spoil him, further provoking more jealousy from the other girls.
Kanae Naruko (鳴子 叶絵, Naruko Kanae)
Voiced by: Yui Horie
Fumino's closest friend, other than Takumi. She is also the class representative, and frequently teases Fumino about Takumi, being aware of her crush towards him. She seems to display a perverted behavior when it comes to skinship, especially towards Fumino. Her nickname for Takumi is "Takumicchi".
Kaho Chikumaen (竹馬園 夏帆, Chikumaen Kaho)
Voiced by: Yukari Tamura
A long-time acquaintance of Chise, as her family has had close relations with the Umenomori family for generations. She is two years older than Chise and the other members of Stray Cats Associates Club. She seems to be a prim and proper lady, and unlike Chise, uses Kei-go (敬語) in 100% of her dialog. She is exceptionally intelligent and is apparently skilled in manipulation. Like Fumino, she cannot be honest about her words and actions, while at the same time, unlike Fumino, she has no friends who can understand her well. She is also one of the ladies outside of the heroines to be romantically interested in Takumi. Kaho has qualified nurse training and later went to pursue medicine in Germany after graduating from Umenomori Gakuen, which she transferred to during her last semester in her final year. She is also the first girl to kiss Takumi, even sacrificing her first kiss just to invoke amusing reactions from the girls who are after him.
In the anime, she apparently finds a passed out Takumi in the mountains, and saves him from getting soaked outside in the rain. She pretends to be lost in the mountains, when in fact, she is very familiar with the area (it later turns out that the area belongs to her family), for reasons unknown.
She gets an extended role in the manga adaptation, where she happens to be the one who alerts Shimako Murasame about the whereabouts of Nozomi. The bond between the Stray Cats camaraderie proves to be unbreakable as she admits her defeat (indicating this was one of her schemes). She later transfers to Umenomori Gakuen following that incident and expresses her wish to join the Stray Cats Associates Club.
Ieyasu Kikuchi (菊池 家康, Kikuchi Ieyasu)
Voiced by: Hiroyuki Yoshino
One of Takumi's best male friends, and a galge maniac. He frequently provokes Fumino with his comments and is most of the time protected by Takumi from her outbursts. He also has a tendency to compare situations in galge to those in real life. He calls Otome 'Master', because she once saved him from a group of delinquents, and has been the only girl in the 3-D world whose existence he fully acknowledges. He is normally seen with or conspiring with Chise on her plans due to both of their liking of anime and manga and the fact that Chise often offers him something of value due to her wealth.
Daigorō Kōya (幸谷 大吾郎, Kōya Daigorō)
Voiced by: Junji Majima
One of Takumi's best male friends who is very old fashioned. He apparently holds Otome in the highest regard, and addresses her with the suffix '-dono', because he greatly admires her helping spirit. He is engaged to Tamao Fujino after her confession on Valentine's Day.
Satō & Suzuki (佐藤 & 鈴木)
Voiced by: Rina Satō & Satomi Arai
Maids of Chise. They can erase their presence completely and appear without fail whenever Chise calls for them. Satou is actually classmates with Takumi and company, while Suzuki is actually a second-year student at Umenomori Gakuen.
Tamao Fujino (藤野 珠緒, Fujino Tamao)
Voiced by: Yuuka Nanri
A long hair beauty and student of Umenomori Gakuen who is two years senior to Takumi and friends. She belongs to Kei-On-Bu (軽音部, Light Music Club), which has only 3 members. She is on very good terms with Kanae, and is also part of the Spats (which refers to a type of athletic tights in Japan) faction led by Fumino in volume 2 of the series. After her love confession to Daigorō on Valentine's Day in her final semester, she became engaged to him. Subsequently, she calls Daigorō Dai-chan, and acts lovey-dovey over him, often joining the Stray Cats Associates Club meeting in their clubroom and feeding Daigorō food.
Kokoro Towano (十和野 心, Towano Kokoro)
Voiced by: Ai Kayano
Twin-tailed girl who is one year junior to Takumi and friends. A new student to Umenomori Gakuen and a Fujoshi, she joined Stray Cats Associates Club after scoring a break-through high in an extremely high-level examination on otaku knowledge set by Ieyasu. During junior high, she missed attending school often as the other students often made fun of her. By the end of volume 7, she was the fifth girl to fall for Takumi in the series.

== Media ==
=== Light novels ===
The Mayoi Neko Overrun! light novels were written by Tomohiro Matsu and published by Shueisha. 12 volumes were released under the Super Dash Bunko imprint between October 24, 2008, and February 24, 2012. The first nine feature illustrations by Peco, with Yasu, Hekiru Hikawa, and Misato Mitsumi then illustrating one each.

No.	Title	Japanese release date	Japanese ISBN
1	拾ってなんていってないんだからね!!	October 24, 2008	978-4-08-630450-4
2	拾わせてあげてもいいわよ！？	December 25, 2008	978-4-08-630463-4
3	……拾う？	February 25, 2009	978-4-08-630471-9
4	みんな私が拾います♪	April 24, 2009	978-4-08-630482-5
5	本気で拾うと仰いますの？	June 25, 2009	978-4-08-630490-0
6	拾った後はどうするの？	August 25, 2009	978-4-08-630500-6
7	拾ったらいいじゃないですか！	November 25, 2009	978-4-08-630515-0
8	I'll let you adopt me!	March 25, 2010	978-4-08-630538-9
9	わたしがみんなに護られてるの♪	July 23, 2010	978-4-08-630556-3
10	……護る？	August 25, 2011	978-4-08-630634-8
11	護らせてあげてもいいわよ!?	November 25, 2011	978-4-08-630641-6
12	護ってなんていってないんだからね!!	February 24, 2012	978-4-08-630663-8

=== Manga ===
A manga adaptation by Kentaro Yabuki began monthly serialization in the February 2010 issue of Shueisha's Jump SQ. magazine, which was released on January 4, 2010. Many characters from Yabuki's previous manga, To Love Ru, make cameo appearances. Due to Yabuki being set to begin To Love Ru Darkness in Jump SQ. on October 4, 2010, Mayoi Neko Overrun! was transferred to the quarterly Jump SQ.19, beginning with the spin-off magazine's Summer 2010 issue on August 19, 2010. Shueisha collected and published chapters in two tankōbon volumes on April 30 and September 3, 2010. In August 2011, the editorial department suddenly announced that the Mayoi Neko Overrun! manga had ended without giving an explanation. It was also stated that the second tankōbon would be its last, leaving several chapters never collected outside their magazine publication.

No.	Japanese release date	Japanese ISBN
1	April 30, 2010	978-4-08-870042-7
2	September 3, 2010	978-4-08-870108-0

=== Anime ===
An anime television series adaptation animated by AIC aired on Tokyo MX and BS11 from April 6 to June 29, 2010. Each episode was directed by a different person.

No.	Title	Original release date
1	"Stray Cats, Dashed" "Mayoi Neko, Kaketa" (迷い猫、駆けた)	April 6, 2010
On the way to school, Fumino spots something strange behind the trash can resembling cat ears. Later, Takumi and the others then discover that one of the cake orders was mysteriously eaten up. Ieyasu suspects a little boy for the incident and disbelieves the boy's claims that a large cat is responsible. Realizing what happened in the morning, Fumino tries to find the cat with the boy. Ieyasu and Chise, also after the large cat for their desires (Ieyasu's galge desires and Chise's RPG game "Grand Bravers") compete with Fumino. After Ieyasu, Fumino, and Chise fail to capture the mysterious figure, Otome return home the next day and presents the strange cat, who is a human girl, to Takumi and the others.
2	"Stray Cats, Smiled" "Mayoi Neko, Waratta" (迷い猫、笑った)	April 13, 2010
Takumi and the others try to get details and origin from the mysterious person named Nozomi, but Nozomi is too quiet and doesn't give any responses. The next day, Takumi teaches Nozomi to make cakes at Stray Cats. Nozomi learns quickly, surpassing Otome's failure attempt at making strawberry cakes for the first time. Otome declares Nozomi as a new patissier. Nozomi then goes to school adapts to the environment quickly. Chise tries to use Nozomi as her servant, but fails when everyone decides to return to work at Stray Cats. Then, a large typhoon breaks out, forcing the store to close early. As Otome is out helping other people, Takumi must spend the night with Nozomi, making Fumino jealous.
3	"Stray Cats, Found" "Mayoi Neko, Mitsuketa" (迷い猫、見つけた)	April 20, 2010
As the large typhoon continues to Episode 2, Takumi explains about his life with Fumino to Nozomi. halfway through the storm, Fumino arrives to "Stray Cats" hoping to be with Takumi during the storm. Later, a blackout occurs, forcing Takumi to sleep with Fumino and Nozomi. the next morning, Nozomi disappears. Takumi suspects that it might be his talk about Fumino that caused Nozomi to leave. Everyone including Chise and Ieyasa search for Nozomi.
4	"Stray Cats, Undressed" "Mayoi Neko, Nuida" (迷い猫、脱いだ)	April 27, 2010
In a trip to the hot springs, Chise continues to demonstrate her superiority over Fumino. While Chise demonstrates all the amenities, Ieyasu at the other side attempts to spy on the girls. He accidentally activates a trap, sending them far into the woods. During their journey back to the hot springs, Takumi gets separated from the other boys. A girl named Kaho, pretending to be lost picks him up and brings him to a shelter. She cuddles up towards him for warmth. As Takumi and everyone try to find their path back to the hotel, they show up naked in front of Fumino, Chise, and Nozomi. Chise reveals to Takumi that Kaho actually knows the place very well and is accompanied by many bodyguards.
5	"Stray Cats, Cried" "Mayoi Neko, Naita" (迷い猫、泣いた)	May 4, 2010
Chise feels left out as the other members are occupied with the Stray Cats shop. She tries to solve the problem by building a competitor shop across the street. Her plan was to steal all their customers and bankrupting them to force them to become her employees, allowing her to control their schedules. As Chise tries to convince Takumi and the others to close down their shop and move over to her store, Takumi explains that Stray Cats represents his life. He realizes that Kaho was the person who gave Chise such advice.
6	"Stray Cats, Troubled" "Mayoi Neko, Komatta" (迷い猫、困った)	May 11, 2010
Chise and the others are clueless about what to do with their club. Trying to get suggestions from classmates, they received only one reply asking what the "Stray Cats Appreciation Society" is. Nozomi and Chise suggests that the world needs to know more about their club. Ieyasu proposes an idea of a promotional movie and pushes a tight schedule to film all the scenes, tiring Takumi. Through many hardships including Chise and Fumino's dispute regarding music and extreme filming sites such as the top of Mount Everest, the final product was a success. However, due to Ieyasu's galge style, most of hardwork did not appear in the final product, angering Fumino and Chise.
7	"Stray Cats, Rode" "Mayoi Neko, Notta" (迷い猫、乗った)	May 18, 2010
The entire episode focuses on Chise's favorite anime television series "Grand Braver". In this anime, Machine Duke attempts to destroy earth and three robots. Hazuki, who was taken into possession, learns of her past and betrays Machine Duke. Machine Duke absorbs all of earth's energy and destroys Hazuki. As a last hope, the commander weakens the defense forces of Machine Duke, allowing the three robots to enter the inside of Machine Duke. Machine Duke nearly destroys Hazuki and the commander, but the three robots arrive in time to combine into Grand Braver. Grand Braver's attacks are easily absorbed by Machine Duke. Hazuki wishes for help and combines with the others to for Great Grande Braver and defeats Machine Duke.
8	"Stray Cats, Drawn Out" "Mayoi Neko, Nuita" (迷い猫、抜いた)	May 25, 2010
Takumi and the others compete in a game of Jenga. Each block contains a command that each person must perform before placing the block on top of the structure. Chise cheats by having Ieyasu reveal safe moves from her supercomputer through finger tapping. Her intention is eliminate all but Takumi, Ieyasu, and her so she could spend more time with Takumi and infuriate Fumino. Takumi and the others want a new mixer as a prize. When Fumino pulls out a block with a revealing command (Kiss someone of opposite gender) and chooses to perform it, Nozomi and Chise try to stop her, making all three of them topple the Jenga structure and allowing Takumi to win. Takumi bought a new uniform for Chise as a prize.
9	"Stray Cats, Swam" "Mayoi Neko, Oyoida" (迷い猫、泳いだ)	June 1, 2010
Nozomi watches a TV commercial about the beach, making everyone else think that Nozomi wants a vacation. Otome takes everyone to a vacation at the beach. Everyone play various games such as beach volleyball to satisfy Nozomi. However, Nozomi only wished for everyone to play together with her. As Takumi and Fumino spend their time together later in the afternoon, rainfall and thunderstorm suddenly occurs. Takumi and Fumino, having gone too far from shore, seek shelter on an island. As Takumi and Fumino are stranded after their boat disappears, they gaze at the stars and remember about their pastime. Chise finds Takumi and Fumino in an embarrassing situation.
10	"Stray Cats, Waited" "Mayoi Neko, Mattetta" (迷い猫、持ってった)	June 8, 2010
Otome captures another mysterious girl named Honoka and takes her into the Stray Cats store for Fumino and Nozomi to babysit. Chise arrives and becomes surprised when Honoka is the only customer at Stray Cats. As Fumino and Chise realizes Otome's nature, Nozomi bakes a welcome cake for Honoka. Nozomi takes care of Honoka and learns more about Honoka, including the fact that she was separated from her mom when she wanted to catch birds. Otome arrives later tonight with Honoka's mom explaining that she has a place to return to. The message causes Fumino, Chise, and Nozomi to think about their places to return to.
11	"Stray Cats, Shattered" "Mayoi Neko, Wareta" (迷い猫、割れた)	June 15, 2010
The Unemonori Group sets up a fitness festival at school. Chise, Fumino and Otome are all debating who should pair up with Takumi for the three-legged race. Fumino is even angrier at Chise for her attempts to promote bloomers in the festival, attracting the male students. Fumino fights back by promoting spats, attracting the female students. Divided, Fumino, Chise, and the others decide the winning outfit by letting Takumi decide. While Takumi tries to understand Nozomi's depression, he gets heavily bombarded by persuasion and fights between Chise's bloomers and Fumino's spats. Meanwhile, a mysterious principal arrives at the Stray Cats.
12	"Stray Cats, Decided" "Mayoi Neko, Kimeta" (迷い猫、決めた)	June 22, 2010
As the bloomers and spats debate continues into the festival, Fumino finds Nozomi deciding whether to wear bloomers or spats. Fumino tells Nozomi to pick the choice she wants. Nozomi then wears both bloomers and spats and wins the debate, stating that she wanted everyone to be together. Meanwhile, Otome learns from the principal that Nozomi was a runaway prodigy from the Murasume Academy. She was to become the 13th Murasume and be adopted by the Murasume household. The principal then finds Nozomi in the middle of the three-legged relay and demands her to return. Nozomi refuses stating that she wants to find her own desires and sees Stray Cats as her family.
13	"Stray Cats, Wrapped Up" "Mayoi Neko, Matomatta" (迷い猫、まとまった)	June 29, 2010
This episode is essentially a review and commentary of all the previous episodes by Nozomi, Fumino and Chise.

==== Theme music ====
Opening themes

- "Happy New Nyaa" (はっぴぃ にゅう にゃあ; "Happy New Meow") by Kanae Itō, Yuka Iguchi and Ayana Taketatsu
- "Go! Grand Braver!" (GO! グランブレイバー!) by Yoshiki Fukuyama (episode 7)

Ending themes

- "Ichalove Come Home!" (イチャラブ Come Home!) by Kanae Itō, Yuka Iguchi and Ayana Taketatsu
- "Mayoi Neko Doukoukai no Uta" (迷い猫同好会の歌, Mayoi Neko Dōkōkai no Uta; "Stray Cats Club Theme Song") by Kanae Itō, Yuka Iguchi and Ayana Taketatsu (episode 6)
- "Kanadete Hoshi Uta" (奏でて星歌) by Hitomi Mieno (episode 7)
- "Thank You Bloomer ~Arigatō no Kimochi~" (サンキュー・ブルマ～ありがとうのキモチ～, Sank Yū Buruma ~Arigatō no Kimochi~) by Umenomori Gakuen Bloomer Ha no Minna-san (episode 11)

Insert songs

- "Thank You Bloomer ~Arigatō no Kimochi~" by Umenomori Gakuen Bloomer Ha no Minna-san (episode 11)
- "Heart no Spats ni" (ハートのスパッツに, Hāto no Supattsu ni) by Umenomori Gakuen Spats Ha no Minna-san (episode 11)

== Reception ==
The Mayoi Neko Overrun! novels had sold over two million copies by February 2012. The manga adaptation's two collected volumes both ranked on Oricon's weekly list of the best-selling manga. The first volume debuted at number 12 with 91,599 copies sold its first week, but rose to number nine the following week for 151,256 copies sold in total. The second volume debuted at number five with 94,483 copies sold.

Reviewing the anime adaptation for Anime News Network, Theron Martin called Mayoi Neko Overrun! a "create a harem romantic comedy by the numbers" due to it featuring the classic tsundere character in Fumino, the classic spoiled princess in Chise, and the classic catgirl in Nozomi. However, his colleague Carl Kimlinger felt that the characters are always one step beyond the stereotypes they first appear to be, and if you add to that "a high cuteness factor, a pleasant visual style, and an unexpected level of emotional maturity", you have a series that "is good (if not great)".
