= List of To Love Ru episodes =

To Love Ru is an anime series based on the manga of the same title written by Saki Hasemi and illustrated by Kentaro Yabuki. Produced by Xebec and directed by Takao Kato, the anime aired in Japan between April 4 and September 26, 2008. While the anime uses characters and general themes from the original manga, a large majority of this season was anime-original and did not adapt much material from its source manga. The anime's opening theme is "Forever We Can Make It!" by Thyme, the first ending theme for episodes one through thirteen is "Lucky Tune" (ラッキーチューン, Rakkī Chūn), and the second ending theme is "Kiss no Yukue" (kiss の行方); both are sung by Anna. Three original video animation (OVA) episodes produced by Xebec and directed by Takao Kato were shipped starting on April 3, 2009 with pre-ordered copies of the manga's 13th, 14th and 15th volumes. An additional three OVA episodes were released with the bundled version of the 16th, 17th and 18th volumes. The opening theme for the OVAs is "Yatte Koi Daisuki" and the ending theme is "Apple panic"; both songs are by Haruka Tomatsu and Sayuri Yahagi, the voice actresses of Lala Satalin Deviluke and Haruna Sairenji, respectively.

The anime is licensed in North America by Sentai Filmworks and distributed by Section23 Films. The complete DVD collection part one containing the first half-season was released on December 15, 2009 and part two containing the second half-season was released on February 16, 2010. Sentai released the series on Blu-ray on March 18, 2014.

A second season of the anime titled Motto To Love Ru (もっとTo LOVEる -とらぶる-, More To Love Ru -trouble-) was produced by Xebec and directed by Atsushi Ōtsuki. It aired for 12 episodes between October 6 and December 22, 2010 and would mark the beginning of the anime strictly adhering to the manga. The opening theme for the second season is "Loop-the-Loop" by Kotoko and the ending theme is "Baby Baby Love" by Tomatsu. Sentai Filmworks have also licensed the second season and released the complete series set on DVD on April 3, 2012; the Blu-ray set was released on May 27, 2014.

Six OVA episodes of To Love Ru Darkness, a sequel manga, were produced by Xebec and released with the limited editions of the manga's 5th, 6th, 8th, 9th, 12th, and 13th volumes on DVD on August 17, 2012, December 19, 2012, August 19, 2013, December 4, 2013, December 4, 2014, and April 3, 2015, respectively. A twelve-episode anime television series and third season overall was also produced by Xebec, directed by Atsushi Ōtsuki, and aired between October 6 and December 29, 2012. The opening theme for To Love Ru Darkness is "Rakuen Project" (楽園PROJECT) by Ray and the ending theme is "Foul Play ni Kurari" (ファールプレーにくらり) by Kanon Wakeshima. Sentai Filmworks released To Love Ru Darkness on DVD and Blu-ray in North America on July 15, 2014.

A second season of To Love Ru Darkness and fourth overall, titled To Love Ru Darkness 2nd aired in Japan between July 7 and October 29, 2015. The opening theme is "secret arms" by Ray while the ending theme is "Gardens" by Mami Kawada. Sentai Filmworks released To Love Ru Darkness 2nd on DVD and Blu-ray in North America on November 1, 2016. Three OVA episodes of To Love Ru Darkness 2nd were produced by Xebec between January 4 and December 2, 2016. A fourth OVA episode to commemorate the 10th anniversary of To Love Ru was released on November 2, 2017 with a book titled To Love Ru Chronicles.

== Series overview ==
Season	Episodes	Originally released	
Season	Episodes	First released	Last released
1	26	April 4, 2008	September 26, 2008
2	12	October 6, 2010	December 22, 2010
3	12	October 6, 2012	December 29, 2012
4	14	July 7, 2015	October 28, 2015

== Episode list ==
=== Season 1 (2008) ===
No.	Title	Directed by	Written by	Storyboarded by	Original release date
1	"The Girl Who Fell From the Sky"; Transliteration: "Maiorita Shōjo" (Japanese: 舞い降りた少女)	Taketomo Ishikawa	Akatsuki Yamatoya	Kato Takao	April 4, 2008
2	"A Broken Engagement!?"; Transliteration: "Kon'yaku Kaishō!?" (Japanese: 婚約解消!?)	Yukio Kuroda	Akatsuki Yamatoya	Akira Nishimori	April 11, 2008
3	"Love Triangle"; Transliteration: "Sankaku Kankei" (Japanese: 三角関係)	Akihiro Enomoto	Akatsuki Yamatoya	Akihiro Enomoto	April 18, 2008
4	"A Love Apron From Outer Space"; Transliteration: "Uchū no Rabu Epuron" (Japanese: 宇宙のLOVEエプロン)	Takeshi Nagasawa	Katsuhiko Chiba	Takeshi Nagasawa	April 25, 2008
5	"The Queen's Challenge"; Transliteration: "Kuīn no Chōsenjō" (Japanese: くいーんの挑戦状)	Yukio Kuroda	Kento Shimoyama	DOJAG-A-GEN	May 2, 2008
6	"The Alien Assassin"; Transliteration: "Uchūjin no Shikaku" (Japanese: 宇宙人の刺客)	Hideya Takahashi	Yoshio Urasawa	Shinsuke Terazawa	May 9, 2008
7	"All Men Should Be Like This!"; Transliteration: "Otoko to wa Kaku Arubeshi!" (Japanese: 男とはかくあるべし)	Masayuki Matsumoto	Akatsuki Yamatoya	Harume Kosaka	May 16, 2008
8	"The Prefect of Spotless Integrity"; Transliteration: "Seiren Keppaku Fūki Iin" (Japanese: 清廉潔白風紀委員)	Naoyoshi Kusaka	Kento Shimoyama	DOJAG-A-GEN	May 23, 2008
9	"From a Shining Star, With Love"; Transliteration: "Hikariboshi yori Ai o Komete" (Japanese: 光星より愛を込めて)	Akihiro Enomoto	Katsuhiko Chiba	Akihiro Enomoto	May 30, 2008
10	"A Space Entertainer"; Transliteration: "Uchū no Onna Geinin" (Japanese: 宇宙の女芸人)	Takeshi Nagasawa	Yoshio Urasawa	Takeshi Nagasawa	June 6, 2008
11	"Golden Darkness"; Transliteration: "Konjiki no Yami" (Japanese: 金色の闇)	Yukio Kuroda	Katsuhiko Chiba	DOJAG-A-GEN	June 12, 2008
12	"A Frightening Field Day!"; Transliteration: "Senritsu Taiikusai" (Japanese: 戦慄体育祭)	Michita Shiraishi	Kento Shimoyama	Amino Tetsuro	June 20, 2008
13	"The Greatest Man in the Universe"; Transliteration: "Uchūichi no Otoko" (Japanese: 宇宙一の男)	Naoyoshi Kusaka	Akatsuki Yamatoya	DOJAG-A-GEN	June 27, 2008
14	"A Secret Between the Two of Us"; Transliteration: "Futari dake no Himitsu" (Japanese: ふたりだけの秘密)	Taketomo Ishikawa	Akatsuki Yamatoya	Taketomo Ishikawa	July 4, 2008
15	"Princess of the Jungle"; Transliteration: "Mitsurin no Purinsesu" (Japanese: 密林のプリンセス)	Yukio Kuroda	Katsuhiko Chiba	Akira Nishimori	July 11, 2008
16	"Run's Surprise Confession"; Transliteration: "Run no Totsugeki Kokuhaku Taimu" (Japanese: ルンの突撃告白タイム)	Akihiro Enomoto	Kento Shimoyama	Akihiro Enomoto	July 19, 2008
17	"The Ghost in the Old School Building"; Transliteration: "Kyūkōsha no Yūrei" (Japanese: 旧校舎の幽霊)	Hideya Takahashi	Yoshio Urasawa	Hideya Takahashi	July 25, 2008
18	"Saruyama, the Gift"; Transliteration: "Saruyama ga Omiyage" (Japanese: 猿山がお土産)	Naoyoshi Kusaka	Yoshio Urasawa	DOJAG-A-GEN	August 1, 2008
19	"Hell's Hot Springs: Alien Girls and Colorful Exposed Bodies"; Transliteration: "Jigoku Onsen Onna Uchūjin Nanairo Porori" (Japanese: 地獄温泉女宇宙人七色ポロリ)	Mikuri Kyosuke	Katsuhiko Chiba	Masahiko Ohta	August 8, 2008
20	"Explosive Heat Magical Girl Kyouko Flame"; Transliteration: "Bakunetsu Shōjo Majikaru Kyōko Fureimu" (Japanese: 爆熱少女 マジカルキョーコ炎)	Yukio Kuroda	Yoshio Urasawa	DOJAG-A-GEN	August 15, 2008
21	"A Chronicle of Bloodshed at the Yuuki Inn"; Transliteration: "Yūkitei Keppūroku" (Japanese: 結城亭血風録)	Naoyoshi Kusaka	Katsuhiko Chiba	DOJAG-A-GEN	August 22, 2008
22	"A Frightening School Festival!"; Transliteration: "Senritsu! Bunkasai" (Japanese: 戦慄!文化祭)	Shigeru Ueda	Akatsuki Yamatoya	Akira Nishimori	August 29, 2008
23	"Saruyama’s Tales of the Inner Chambers"; Transliteration: "Saruyama no Ōoku Monogatari" (Japanese: 猿山の大奥物語)	Akihiro Enomoto	Yoshio Urasawa	Akihiro Enomoto	September 5, 2008
24	"With Shyness"; Transliteration: "Hajirai Nagara" (Japanese: はじらいながら)	Yukio Kuroda	Katsuhiko Chiba	DOJAG-A-GEN	September 12, 2008
25	"The Earth's Final Night"; Transliteration: "Chikyū Saigo no Yoru" (Japanese: 地球最後の夜)	Naoyoshi Kusaka	Akatsuki Yamatoya	DOJAG-A-GEN	September 19, 2008
26	"Lala"; Transliteration: "Rara" (Japanese: ララ)	Atsushi Otsuki	Akatsuki Yamatoya	Takeshi Nagasawa	September 26, 2008

=== Season 2: Motto (2010) ===
No. overall	No. in season	Title	Original release date
27	1	"Once More, From Here"; Transliteration: "Mō Ichido Koko Kara" (Japanese: もう一度ここから)	October 6, 2010
27	1	"War at the Public Bath"; Transliteration: "Ofuroba Sensō" (Japanese: お風呂場戦争)	October 6, 2010
27	1	"Tick Tock Tick Tock, the Sound of Love♡"; Transliteration: "Chikutaku Chikutaku Koi no Oto♡" (Japanese: チクタク チクタク 恋の音♡)	October 6, 2010
28	2	"Those Warped into the Midst of Darkness"; Transliteration: "Kurayami no Naka de Utsuru Mono" (Japanese: 暗闇の中でうつるもの)	October 13, 2010
28	2	"Welcome to the Yuuki Household!"; Transliteration: "Yōkoso! Yūki-ke e" (Japanese: ようこそ!結城家へ)	October 13, 2010
28	2	"Sleepover Party"; Transliteration: "Otomarikai" (Japanese: お泊り会)	October 13, 2010
29	3	"Magic Love Potion♡"; Transliteration: "Tokkō yaku♡" (Japanese: 特恋薬♡)	October 20, 2010
29	3	"What I See Through the Lens is..." Transliteration: "Renzu Goshi ni Miru Kimi wa..." (Japanese: レンズ越しに見る君は...)	October 20, 2010
29	3	"You are the Lovely Cinderella♡"; Transliteration: "Itoshi no Kimi wa Shinderera♡" (Japanese: 愛しの君はシンデレラ♡)	October 20, 2010
30	4	"Yami-Yami Fashion"; Transliteration: "Yami-Yami Fasshon" (Japanese: ヤミヤミファッション)	October 27, 2010
30	4	"Wonderful Love♡"; Transliteration: "Wandafuru Rabu♡" (Japanese: ワンダフル·ラブ♡)	October 27, 2010
30	4	"Twins Escape"; Transliteration: "Tsuinzu Esukeipu" (Japanese: ツインズ☆エスケイプ)	October 27, 2010
31	5	"Queen of Love!?"; Transliteration: "Ren'ai Kuīn!?" (Japanese: 恋愛クイーン!?)	November 3, 2010
31	5	"Let's Play ♪"; Transliteration: "Oyūgi Shimasho ♪" (Japanese: お遊戯しましょ♪)	November 3, 2010
31	5	"Sweet Feelings are a Taste of Chocolate"; Transliteration: "Amai Kimochi wa Choko no Aji" (Japanese: 甘い気持ちはチョコの味)	November 3, 2010
32	6	"Beach Girls♡"; Transliteration: "Bīchi Gāruzu♡" (Japanese: ビーチ·ガールズ♡)	November 10, 2010
32	6	"Night Tutor"; Transliteration: "Shin'ya no Katei Kyōshi" (Japanese: 深夜の家庭教師)	November 10, 2010
32	6	"Master of Love"; Transliteration: "Ren'ai Masutā" (Japanese: 恋愛マスター)	November 10, 2010
33	7	"Yami's Clinic"; Transliteration: "Yami no Shinryōjo" (Japanese: 闇の診療所)	November 17, 2010
33	7	"Hostile Feelings"; Transliteration: "Tekitaishin" (Japanese: 敵対心)	November 17, 2010
33	7	"A Strange Haruna"; Transliteration: "Okashi na Haruna-chan" (Japanese: おかしな春菜ちゃん)	November 17, 2010
34	8	"Grow Bigger ♪"; Transliteration: "Ōkiku Nāre ♪" (Japanese: 大きくなぁーれ♪)	November 24, 2010
34	8	"Wan-derful Life"; Transliteration: "Wandafuru Raifu" (Japanese: ワンダフルライフ)	November 24, 2010
34	8	"The Trance of Feelings"; Transliteration: "Kibun wa Toransu" (Japanese: 気分はトランス)	November 24, 2010
35	9	"For Whom the Bell Tolls"; Transliteration: "Dare ga Tame ni Beru wa Naru" (Japanese: 誰がためにベルは鳴る)	December 1, 2010
35	9	"Troubling Rampage?"; Transliteration: "Meiwaku Bōsō?" (Japanese: 迷惑暴走?)	December 1, 2010
35	9	"Loving Idol"; Transliteration: "Koigokoro Aidoru" (Japanese: 恋心アイドル)	December 1, 2010
36	10	"Pollen Telepathy"; Transliteration: "Kafun Denshin" (Japanese: 花粉伝心)	December 8, 2010
36	10	"A Girl's Feelings"; Transliteration: "Onna no Ko no Kimochi" (Japanese: オンナノコノキモチ)	December 8, 2010
36	10	"Heart Throbbing E-Mail"; Transliteration: "Dokidoki☆Mēru" (Japanese: ドキドキ☆メール)	December 8, 2010
37	11	"All Quiet on the "Sister" Front"; Transliteration: "'Imōto' Sensen Ijō Ari" (Japanese: 「妹」戦線異状アリ)	December 15, 2010
37	11	"The False Love?"; Transliteration: "Itsuwari no Koi?" (Japanese: 偽りの恋?)	December 15, 2010
37	11	"Romantic Forecast"; Transliteration: "Ren'ai Yohō" (Japanese: 恋愛予報)	December 15, 2010
38	12	"I Love You♡"; Transliteration: "Daisuki♡" (Japanese: 大スキ♡)	December 22, 2010

=== Season 3: Darkness (2012) ===
No. overall	No. in season	Title	Original release date
39	1	"Continue"; Transliteration: "Continue ~Kontinyū~" (Japanese: Continue～コンティニュー～)	October 6, 2012
40	2	"Doubt and Dish"; Transliteration: "Dōbt and Dish ~Giwaku to Ryōri~" (Japanese: Doubt and dish～疑惑と料理～)	October 13, 2012
41	3	"Each Speculation"; Transliteration: "Each Speculation ~Sorezore no Omowaku~" (Japanese: Each speculation ～それぞれの思惑～)	October 20, 2012
42	4	"True Smile ~Peace and Anxiety~"; Transliteration: "True Smile ~Kako to Tomodachi to Egao to~" (Japanese: True Smile ～過去と友達と笑顔と～)	October 27, 2012
43	5	"A Man? A Woman? ~The Changing Ones~"; Transliteration: "A Man? A Woman? ~Kawari Ikumonotachi~" (Japanese: A man? A Woman? ～変わり行くもの達～)	November 3, 2012
44	6	"Metamorphose ~Time for a Change...~"; Transliteration: "Metamorphose ~Kawaru Iku Toki...~" (Japanese: Metamorphose ～変わり行く時…～)	November 10, 2012
45	7	"Sisters ~The Invention of Happiness~"; Transliteration: "Sisters ~Shiawase no Hatsumeihin~" (Japanese: Sisters ～幸せの発明品～)	November 17, 2012
46	8	"Bad Mood ~Bonds of Happiness~"; Transliteration: "Bad Mood ~Shiawase no Kizuna~" (Japanese: Bad mood ～幸せの絆～)	December 1, 2012
47	9	"True Self ~True Face in the Darkness~"; Transliteration: "True Self ~Yami no Naka no Sugao~" (Japanese: True Self ～闇の中の素顔～)	December 8, 2012
48	10	"Past ~Memories Leading to Tomorrow~"; Transliteration: "Past ~Asu ni Tsunagaru Kioku~" (Japanese: Past ～明日につながる記憶～)	December 15, 2012
49	11	"The Right Thing ~What is a Way of Life?~"; Transliteration: "The Right Thing ~Ikikatatte Nani?~" (Japanese: The Right Thing ～生き方って何?～)	December 22, 2012
50	12	"Room ~A Maiden's Feelings~"; Transliteration: "Room ~Otome no Omoi~" (Japanese: Room ～乙女の想い～)	December 29, 2012

=== Season 4: Darkness 2nd (2015) ===
No. overall	No. in season	Title	Original release date
51	1	"Unconsciously ~Light Head☆Beating Heart~"; Transliteration: "Unconsciously: Atama Fuwafuwa☆Kokoro Dokidoki" (Japanese: Unconsciously～頭ふわふわ☆心どきどき～)	July 7, 2015
52	2	"Uneasy ~Hesitant Heart~"; Transliteration: "Uneasy: Kokoro no Mayoi" (Japanese: Uneasy～心の迷い～)	July 14, 2015
53	3	"After a Storm Comes a Calm ~Friends~"; Transliteration: "After a Storm Comes a Calm: Tomodachi" (Japanese: After a Storm Comes a Calm～ともだち～)	July 21, 2015
54	4	"Summer festival ~Beginning of the Festival~"; Transliteration: "Summer Festival: Matsuri no Hajimari" (Japanese: Summer festival～祭りの始まり～)	July 28, 2015
55	5	"New Move ~Two of a Kind?~"; Transliteration: "New Move: Nitamono Doushi?" (Japanese: New move～似たものどうし？～)	August 4, 2015
56	6	"Manservant ~Competition~"; Transliteration: "Manservant: Soudatsu-sen" (Japanese: Manservant～争奪戦～)	August 11, 2015
57	7	"Resistance ~I Know, But Still~"; Transliteration: "Resistance: Wakatteiru Kedo" (Japanese: Resistance 〜わかっているけど〜)	August 25, 2015
58	8	"Danger ~Danger~"; Transliteration: "Danger: Ki Ken" (Japanese: Danger 〜危・剣〜)	September 1, 2015
59	9	"Kiss ~What Lies Beyond a Kiss~"; Transliteration: "Kiss: Kiss no Saki ni Aru Mono" (Japanese: Kiss 〜キスの先にあるもの〜)	September 8, 2015
60	10	"True Character ~Identity Revealed!?~"; Transliteration: "True Character: Shoutai Bareta!?" (Japanese: True Character 〜正体バレた！？〜)	September 15, 2015
61	11	"The Beginning of Darkness ~That Time~"; Transliteration: "The Beginning of Darkness: Sono Toki" (Japanese: The Beginning of Darkness 〜その時〜)	September 22, 2015
62	12	"Prediction is Impossible ~Rampaging Darkness~"; Transliteration: "Prediction is Impossible: Bousou Suru Yami" (Japanese: Prediction is Impossible 〜暴走する闇〜)	September 29, 2015
63	13	"Power and power ~Protector and the Protected~"; Transliteration: "Pawā ando power 〜Mamoru Mono to Mamora reru Mono〜" (Japanese: Power and power 〜守るものと守られるもの〜)	October 28, 2015
64	14	"Bright future ~Thank You~"; Transliteration: "Bright future 〜Arigatō〜" (Japanese: Bright future 〜ありがとう〜)	October 28, 2015

== OVAs ==
=== To Love Ru (2009–10) ===
These OVAs take place before Motto To Love Ru.

No.	Title	Original release date
1	"Rito, Becomes a Woman"; Transliteration: "Rito, Onna ni Naru" (Japanese: リト、女になる)	April 3, 2009
As Saruyama tries to explain about boobs to Rito, the girls including Lala overhear the conversation. Lala asks for more facts about boobs and gets the idea that all men are interested in breasts. She makes an invention that will make her boobs the perfect size, but Rito flies out from a school window and crashes into the invention, turning him into a girl. After Lala and Mikan tease him with girl clothing, Rito runs out of the house. He gets bombarded by many men including Saruyama and the principal. Saki finds Rito (still as a girl) unconscious and brings him/her into Saki's mansion. Riko (Rito as a girl) begins to feel that being a girl may be better than being a boy. While being forced to take a shower with Saki and her friends, Riko’s boob sizes dramatically change as a result of Lala’s invention. He/she gets turned back into a boy by one of Lala's newer inventions when she appears out of nowhere, and the episode ends when Saki and the others deliver a painful beating upon Rito by hitting him in the face with a baseball bat.
2	"Rito and Mikan"; Transliteration: "Rito to Mikan" (Japanese: リトと美柑)	June 4, 2009
Rito is always spending time with Lala; he barely talks to Mikan and creates more work for Mikan to do. Mikan, tired of the situation, suddenly storms out of the house. While Rito and Lala go looking for Mikan, there are few flashbacks of Rito and Mikan in the past including building a snowman. As Rito and Lala look for Mikan, they are intercepted by Saki as she challenges Lala to a barbecue match. Yami comforts Mikan before Rito finds her thanks to Haruna, who explains why Mikan may be feeling upset. Mikan feels okay about the situation, so the two decide to go for a walk. She teases Rito about Lala and Haruna. They go to the same park where Rito and Mikan built a snowman in the past. Lala summons a snow machine to recreate the past event and wishes to see her siblings as well.
3	"Welcome to the Southern Resort!!"; Transliteration: "Minami no Rizōto e Yōkoso!!" (Japanese: 南の島<リゾート>へようこそ!!)	August 4, 2009
Haruna wins a south island resort trip for 10 females. She invites Lala, Mikan, Risa, Mio, Yui, Oshizu, Yami, Run, and Ryouko to the vacation. Rito, thanks to the mess that Lala left behind, activates one of Lala's inventions and gets stuck inside Maron's (Haruna's dog) body. Mistaking it as a bag that Lala left behind (the invention initially turns Maron’s body into a bag), Mikan takes the bag with her, not knowing that she has also brought Rito along with them.
4	"Trouble Quest"; Transliteration: "Toraburu Kuesto" (Japanese: とらぶるくえすと)	November 4, 2009
Rito and the others got stuck inside an RPG game made by Lala's sisters, Nana and Momo. In order to exit from the game, Rito and the others must defeat the great demon lord and rescue Lala. Rito, thinking Lala is behind the entire game, makes progress through the game. He does not realize that the real intent of the game is for Nana and Momo to analyze Rito and find out his true feelings. At the climax of the game, the demon lord teleports Rito to her castle and forces him to admit his feelings to Lala. As Rito cannot bring out a definite answer and Lala covered him up, the angry demon lord tries to defeat all of the characters by modifying the game to give her all the powerups and erase their data. Nana and Momo join in by summoning a giant talking Marron and Celine in her plant form and defeat the demon lord.
5	"Nana and Momo"; Transliteration: "Nana to Momo" (Japanese: ナナとモモ)	February 4, 2010
Rito finds Momo under the covers of his bed, before Nana, one of Lala's sisters, accuses him of sleeping with her. Nana questions Momo why all girls including Lala are attracted to Rito. After observing one whole day with Rito, Nana concludes that everyone is mistaken about Rito. Lala, Mikan, and Rito invite Nana and Momo to Hanami, but Momo turns them down, hoping to use this event to prove her statement about Rito. During the event, Momo summons an alien plant that releases pollen which will bring out everyone's true feelings. The pollen affects everyone except Lala and Rito. Nana does not feel convinced and forces the alien plant to release more pollen. The plant becomes possessed by its own pollen and captures Nana and Momo and later Lala. The plant drops Nana and Rito comes to the rescue, changing Nana's impression of Rito.
6	"Draft"; Transliteration: "Sukimagaze" (Japanese: すきま風)	April 2, 2010
Yami and Yui confront a senior; Yui subsequently loses her panties. She tries to search for her panties while hiding the 'secret' from everyone. Everyone questions Yui's behavior. Later, an incident with Oshizu and a dog exposes her secret to Rito, but a teapot knocks him unconscious before he realizes what he saw, which he describes as "extraordinary". Mikan finds Peke taking snapshots of new clothing while shopping. Suddenly, a stranger steals her bag and runs. Mikan uses Peke's transformation to pursue the thief, who is actually an alien. When she finally confronts him in Yami's clothes, the alien initially mistakes her for Yami, but then notices her brown hair. He then tries to attack her, until Rito arrives at the scene and kicks him down to the ground. The thief tries to shoot down Mikan and Rito, but the real Yami arrives and defeats the thief. As Rito tries to explore Lala's cleaned-up bedroom, he accidentally activates one of Lala's inventions, fusing his hand to Lala's tail. As Rito cannot get his hands off, he goes through a whole day of incidents, including a beating from Nana. During bedtime, Lala tells Rito she enjoyed being with Rito for a whole day. The effects wear off the next day, but Celine activates the invention, making her stuck to Rito's head.

=== To Love Ru Darkness (2012–15) ===
The To Love Ru Darkness OVAs takes place after Motto To Love Ru. The first OVA episode serves as the pilot for the Darkness series while the subsequent OVA episodes consist of side stories between To Love Ru Darkness and To Love Ru Darkness 2nd.

No.	Title	Original release date
1	"Prologue～Commence Project～"; Transliteration: "Prologue ~Project Shidō~" (Prologue ～プロジェクト始動～)	August 17, 2012
1	"Pollen Plan ～Dangerous Litte Sister～"; Transliteration: "Pollen Plan ~Kiken na imōto jōji~" (Pollen Plan ～危険な妹情事～)	August 17, 2012
1	"Body touch? ～MEOWnderful Life～"; Transliteration: "Body Touch? ~Nyan-derful Life~" (Body Touch? ～ニャンダフルライフ～)	August 17, 2012
Momo tries to get Rito’s attention by changing her hairstyle but has little success. Momo then learns from Lala that Rito loves both Lala and Haruna, and since he will become king of Deviluke he can marry both girls, and return both of their love. Inspired, Momo begins a plan to eliminate Rito’s indecisive nature and create a harem for him, so that Momo and the other girls who love Rito can have their love for him be fulfilled. A drunken Celine sprays Mikan with pollen, causing Mikan to develop romantic feelings towards Rito. As she waits for the effects to wear off, Momo learns of her plight and “helps” by leaving her alone with Rito. Mikan succumbs to the effect of the pollen and nearly kisses him, but manages to regain her senses at the last minute. Momo decides Mikan is not yet ready to accept her own feelings but promises she will include Mikan in the harem. Thanks to one of Lala’s inventions, Haruna is turned into a cat and wanders the streets contemplating what to do. Remembering that Nana can speak to animals, she goes to find her but runs into Rito. Circumstances then force Rito to give Haruna a bath, which becomes too much stimulation for her, causing Haruna to revert to normal, albeit naked and on top of an also naked and unconscious Rito. An embarrassed Haruna is then left to explain the situation to a confused Mikan.
2	"Nostalgia ~Back then, At That Place~"; Transliteration: "Nostalgia: Ano Toki, Ano Basho de" (Nostalgia ~あの時, あの場所で~)	December 2, 2012
2	"The Changing Heart ~Honest Feelings~"; Transliteration: "The Changing Heart: Sunao na Kanjou" (The Changing Heart ~素直な感情~)	December 2, 2012
2	"Flower ~Budding Feelings?~"; Transliteration: "Flower: Mebaeru Kanjou?" (Flower~芽生える感情?~)	December 2, 2012
Yui Kotegawa is going to look at cats at the pet store as usual when she finds Rito on the way, they encounter the skunk of youth who broke free from Run's house. Rito tries to grab it but scares it and he and Yui end up turning young again. Eventually, all of Rito's friends are turned into kids. Rito eventually was able to catch the skunk from a high wall where he almost fell but was saved by Yami. The skunk was then put into Nana's Phone where it won't disturb anymore. Back in school, Yui asks Rito if he used to play around a temple she walked by and he confirmed, she then remembered he was the kid who saved a kitten that was stuck in a tree when she was young. Nana enters Rito's room wanting to talk to him, she asks him if he likes big breast girls. He blushes and starts imagining big breasts, Nana seems upset but Rito replies to her saying it's not the breast size that matters and Nana's not having big breasts has her own unique appeal. Nana removes her shirt and gets on top of Rito asking him if he sees her as a woman. Rito desperately tries to get away but grabs her breast, she doesn't slap him and leans to kiss him. Momo bursts out of the closet to stop them. Momo and Nana had switched minds with one of Lala's inventions and Momo was the one in Nana's body. They walk away with Nana (now in her body) blushing and thinking about what she heard Rito say. Rito finds Celine playing with some flowers he's never seen. He smells a pot that has purple flowers and then walks away. Momo finds Celine and explained how those were her flowers and no one should smell them because they can have side effects, Celine told Momo Rito had smelled the purple flowers and she was really worried since those flowers change one's personality. Rito demands Lala to give him her see-through glasses and asks her to pose for him. Excited, Rito starts asking for more breasts and runs to school where he looks at each and every girl and even looks closely at Yui's privates. Momo finds Rito and heals him before anything worse happened. Rito falls unconscious on the floor from all the things he saw.
3	"Exchange ~Me and I~"; Transliteration: "Exchange: Ore to Watashi" (Exchange ~オレと私~)	August 19, 2013
3	"It feels ~Teacher who Endures~"; Transliteration: "It feels: Taeru kyoushi!" (It feels ~耐える教師!~)	August 19, 2013
The episode starts with all of Lala's inventions scattered across a table. Lala is called to help Tearju Lunatique with the copier. Rito and Haruna accidentally change bodies when they catch one of Lala's inventions falling off the table. Momo explains that they have to use each other's bodies for seven hours. Rito in Haruna's body gets splattered with mayonnaise when Haruna in Rito's body steps on a bottle of mayonnaise. The real Haruna has to then give her body a shower. However, the timer countdown finishes during this time, leaving Rito touching Haruna. Celine finds one of Lala's inventions, but because it seems to be broken, Momo lets her play with it. However, it fires a dart that lets Celine massage Tearju Lunatique, causing problems for her as it makes her feel as if someone is playing with her body. When Rito sees Tearju limping, he thinks she might be ill, so offers to take her to the sickroom. Celine uses the machine to violently caress her on the way, making her fall on top of Rito. Yami sees them and thinks that Rito is being "ecchi" to Tearju, so tries to kill him. The device is later revealed to be an invention to massage yourself. Lala gives it to Honekawa because he has terrible back pain.
4	"Girl of Blaze ~Magical Kyouko - Flame~"; Transliteration: "Bakunetsu Shoujo: Magical Kyouko Flame" (爆熱少女 マジカルキョーコ炎[フレイム])	December 4, 2013
4	"Infiltration ~Kyouko in Trouble?~"; Transliteration: "Infiltration: Kyouko! Mairu?" (Infiltration ~キョーコ! 参る?~)	December 4, 2013
4	"Adhesion ~But no Ill Intent~"; Transliteration: "Adhesion: Warugi wa nai Kedo" (Adhesion ~悪気はないけど~)	December 4, 2013
Run messages Rito about starring in an upcoming Magical Kyouko episode and wants Rito to watch it. During the taping, Run puts all of her heart into her acting for Rito which causes her costume to fall off. Kirisaki covers up by going ad libitum to Run. After the taping and a few incidents, Kirisaki tells Run that she understands her intent and advises her to concentrate. During broadcasting, Lala enjoys the show while Rito and Momo are shocked to see the principal sneaking onto the set for Run and Kirisaki. Kirisaki arrives at Sainan High School to give a lecture about working as an idol. After the event, Tearju asks Rito to guide Kirisaki around the school which Rito reluctantly agrees. Rito does not know Kirisaki's main purpose was to observe Rito for a day. As Rito guides Kirisaki through the hallways, he gets unwanted stares from other jealous students. They both come across the principal who initially acts docile but suddenly runs after Kirisaki, making the morals committee discipline him. Afterward, Morenitsu asks Kirisaki for her autograph and draws the attention of many male students, creating a large crowd around Kirisaki. Rito rescues Kirisaki from suffocation and tries to escape from the other male students. Lala senses danger and uses her invention to teleport them into a locker partly naked. Momo helps recover their clothes, but Kirisaki runs home in embarrassment. The next day, Run tells Kirisaki that she experienced similar events in the past. The memories of Rito carrying Kirisaki come into Kirisaki's mind, but Kirisaki quickly brushes it off. An animal with wriggly arms approaches Mikan and Yami. Yami prepares to attack until Nana identifies the animal as Meda-Q. Meda-Q has an interest in Yami and wants to cling to her. As Yami gives in, she shows signs of fear. Later, when Rito brings home taiyaki for Mikan and Meda-Q eats it, Meda-Q goes berserk and quickly overpowers Yami. Afterward, everyone questions Yami's fear of wriggly animals, but Yami declines to explain. Azenda, who learns about Yami's weakness, tries to exploit it but gets instantly defeated by Yami.
5	"Suddenly ~Imagination and Reality~"; Transliteration: "Suddenly: Souzou to Genjitsu" (Suddenly ~想像と現実~)	December 4, 2014
5	"Mobile Phone ~Heart Pounding☆Voice~"; Transliteration: "Mobile Phone: Dokidoki Voice" (Mobile Phone ~ドキドキ☆ボイス~)	December 4, 2014
5	"Moonlight ~Moonlit Angel~"; Transliteration: "Moonlight: Gekka no Tenshi" (Moonlight ~月下の天使~)	December 4, 2014
Mikan gets a surprise visit from her classmates, Sachie Kogure and Mami Nogiwa, who are interested in meeting her brother Rito. Mikan is not optimistic about their visit given Rito's frequent accidents with him falling over and groping one of the girls. The situation gets worse when Rito and later the Deviluke sisters greet Mikan's classmates, making Mikan panic. Despite a near accident with Rito slipping on remote control, the day appears to end well with both of them leaving peacefully until Mikan slips on a shoe and falls on top of Rito right when one of her classmates returns to retrieve her manga. Meanwhile, Momo makes a note of Mikan's classmates. Rito accidentally steps on his cellphone. He fears he will have to buy another phone but Lala offers to fix Rito's phone. Rito accepts. Lala hands Rito an improved model of his phone and has him try it out on Yui who Rito wanted to call to thank for lending a book to Celine. When Rito calls Yui on his new phone, his voice on the receiving end stimulates Yui's senses, bringing her down to her knees. She feels as if Rito's voice is physically molesting her body. As Rito talks about the book, the stimulation on Yui gets worse eventually making her unresponsive. Rito, clueless about the situation, thinks the phone is still broken. Momo offers Rito to try the phone on her and quickly passes out when she hears Rito's voice, revealing the real problem with Rito's improved phone. On the night of the full moon, Rito panics when he finds a naked girl on the rooftop while watering plants and quickly barges into Mikan. Mikan identifies the girl as Celine in her adult form. Everyone is surprised at Celine's rapid growth given that she did nothing unusual previously. Mikan feels a little sad about losing Celine but Rito assures Mikan that Celine is still present. Wanting to celebrate, Celine asks to sleep with Rito and Mikan for the night. As they all go to bed, Momo, who does not understand Celine's species completely, wonders how the full moon could have affected her growth. The next morning, Celine has reverted to her baby form.
6	"Photography ~Take That Awesome Picture!~"; Transliteration: "Photography: Gekisha Seyo!" (Photography ~激写せよ!~)	April 3, 2015
6	"Technique ~The Door of A Maiden~"; Transliteration: "Technique: Otome no Tobira" (Technique ~乙女の扉~)	April 3, 2015
6	"Holiday ~Cooking ☆ Flexation~"; Transliteration: "Holiday: Oryouri no wa Ikutsu?" (Holiday ~お料理の☆はいくつ?~)	April 3, 2015
Run invites Rito to her room and wants him to take pictures of her wearing a swimsuit with her new camera. She is hoping that the photoshoot will seduce Rito into liking her. As Rito starts the camera, the camera takes control of Rito's body. Rito takes pictures of Run in strange poses but then goes overboard by zooming in and attempting to take more erotic shots of Run. Eventually, the camera explodes and injures Rito's face. Run finds out in the manual that the camera can overheat and explode when the user gets too excited. Risa finds Momo shopping for lingerie and asks her out on a date. Momo accepts, hoping that she can learn more about Risa and aid her harem plan. During the date, Momo and Risa discuss boyfriends. Risa wishes she had a boyfriend like Rito and is envious of Momo's having a club of boys at school. After an incident involving the principal, Run, and Kyouko, Risa invites Momo to her place to clean up and uses the opportunity to thoroughly molest Momo. Momo quickly escapes and returns home, confused and frustrated about Risa. While Haruna is thinking about the fortune advice to her, 'cooking for someone you love leads to luck', she finds Rito looking for a cookbook. He wants to make an omelette to express gratitude for Mikan. Haruna learns that Rito cannot cook and offers to teach him, taking advantage of the fortune. In the middle of Rito's lessons, Haruna reveals that she enjoys cooking and wanted to take cooking classes but switched to tennis after being inspired by Rito's athletic ability. Although Rito ends up making a poor quality omelette, Mikan enjoys it because it has Rito's feelings all over it.

=== To Love Ru Darkness 2nd (2016–17) ===
The first three To Love Ru Darkness 2nd OVAs take place 2 days after To Love Ru Darkness 2nd. The fourth OVA adapts an omake chapter released after the end of the To Love Ru Darkness manga.

No.	Title	Original release date
1	"Ghost Story ~How about something scary?~" Transliteration: "Ghost story ～Kowai no wa Ikaga?～" (Japanese: Ghost story ～怖いのはいかが?～)	January 4, 2016
As Rito prepares to sleep, Nemesis sneaks into his room and wants him to tell her a ghost story. Nemesis begs Rito until Momo intervenes. She volunteers to hope that Nemesis would leave afterward. As Nemesis and Rito listen to Momo's ghost story, Nemesis criticizes it. She demonstrates her modification by using candle wax to molest Rito. Momo fights back with her own seduction and gets milky flowers out of her Ddialer and pours their nectar on herself. Then she rubs on Rito's chest and slowly moves up and down creating a harem model. Nemesis also pours some on herself and then rubs equally with Momo. The fighting between Nemesis and Momo wakes Mikan up. When Mikan checks on Rito, Nemesis escapes in time to give Mikan the wrong picture. As Mikan disciplines Rito and Momo, Nemesis notes to be careful of Mikan because she thinks that Mikan is the only thing she is afraid of. Mikan talks with Yami and notices her uneasiness with Tearju. As Mikan discusses it with Rito, Momo receives a call that Ryouko needs extra help at her clinic. Knowing that Tearju lives with Ryouko, Mikan accepts hoping to get Yami to interact with Tearju. Momo also gets Rito to participate by turning him into Riko. Although Riko gets molested by a patient and needs Yami to intervene, the rest of the day goes well. Afterward, Ryouko finds Tearju missing after heading to the basement. Yami goes to search and drags Riko along. As they head down the stairs, Riko encourages Yami to reunite with Tearju but Yami declines. She confronts Riko but quietly thanks her. They suddenly hear Tearju scream and find a medical robot molesting her. She accidentally tripped and activated it. The robot spots Riko and Yami and performs procedures by stripping them and applying bandages. Yami demands Tearju to escape, but Tearju refuses, choosing not to leave her daughter behind. As the robot attempts to cast gauze bandages on Tearju and Riko, Yami destroys it. She also receives an unwanted surprise from Riko.
2	"Mother ~An Angel Too Beautiful~"; Transliteration: "Mother ～Utsukushi sugiru tenshi～" (Japanese: Mother ～美しすぎる天使～)	July 4, 2016
The episode opens with Mikan and Rito peacefully shopping for groceries, accompanied by Celine. As they leave the store and begin walking home, they notice a dispute between two delinquents, which is stopped by a mysterious woman with pink hair, a veil, and a beautiful voice, who then speaks to Mikan and Rito, before being interrupted by the principal, who she then convinces to work for the good of the world. Then Lala, Momo, and Nana come up and introduce her as their mother. They go back to the apartment and find it covered in security men. Momo worries that her mother will find out about the Harem Plan, thinking that she will not approve. They then all speak to the mother, named Sephie Michaela Deviluke, and ask her about her veil. Peke tells them that Sephie a Charmian, and so if men were to see her without it they would immediately turn into beasts. Sephie decides to stay for dinner, and afterward all the Devilukeans and Mikan go to the cyber world Nana created for her animals to take a bath, while Rito puts Celine to sleep. However, Celine runs off, into the magical cyber world, and Rito chases her. While looking, he accidentally trips and crashes into Sephie, grabbing her breasts and veil. When Rito sees Sephie's face unveiled, he freezes, and Peke, assuming he's turned into a beast, uses Nana's panties to restrain him as Sephie runs - right into a group of Nana's animals who, enraptured by her beauty, chase her. Rito, meanwhile, informs Peke that he has kept his reasoning, and then helps Sephie (who has run back to them, away from the animals) escape. When they sit down to hide from the animals, Sephie remarks on how similar Rito is (especially the expression in his eyes) to her husband, who was also unaffected by her charm. Rito also accidentally reveals the Harem Plan. The others, alerted by Peke, hurry to where they are, and Rito is attacked by Nana, who assumes he has turned into a beast. When it is revealed that he is unaffected, all are amazed. After this, they all go back to the house and Sephie has to leave. Before leaving, she whispers to Momo to do what she thinks is right, and to give it her best. Momo realizes that she has found out about her plan and is stunned at her approval. After Sephie leaves, Mikan calls her own mother, wanting to hear her voice. The episode ends with Sephie thinking about her first encounter with her future husband, Gid Lucione Deviluke, who saved her life during the galactic war. While going back she wishes them good luck for Rito.
3	"First Accident? ~First Time....~"; Transliteration: "First Accident? ～Saisho no Jikan....～" (Japanese: First Accident？ ～最初の時間....～)	December 2, 2016
The episode begins with Haruna and Lala (still in her child form) having some tea. Lala calls Rito to come over to her house, much to Haruna's embarrassment. She even plans to have her confess her feelings to Rito or giving him a sudden kiss if she can't do it. Then, Rito arrived to her home with the flowers that Momo told him to give her. As they entered her room, Rito accidentally stepped on Lala's mecha ball (that she's working to get her back to her original age temporarily) and caused him and Haruna to shrink down, leaving them naked (as their clothes remained at normal size). Giving them tissues as clothes, Lala told them that the effects will last about an hour, which unfortunately led to a bad time as Haruna's parents show up for a visit. Peke has Lala disguised as Haruna and joins in on their conversation. Next, when Haruna and Rito fall safely on the floor with her clothes, her dog, Maron, begins to sense her and they hide underneath her panties. Before Rito is about to have their chance to make a run for it, Haruna stopped him and they kissed each other accidentally after Maron leaves when he heard Lala's voice, thought to be Haruna. After having dinner with Mikan and Nana, Rito is delighted that he finally has his kiss with Haruna, but he started to worry if this experience might make her hate him. While he was being unexpectedly seduced by Momo, Haruna started to feel worried as well if the kiss might have made Rito uncomfortable. At school, while Nana is having conversations with Mea about babies born in the cyber safari, Rito started to stay away from Haruna, which makes Haruna think he hated her. After helping Rito escort from Yui and Run, Momo convinced him to confess his feelings towards Haruna, while Oshizu, to who she told the whole thing, wants her to do the same with Rito. Next, Rito and Haruna meet up and they feel anxious about what they want to say. However, before Rito was about to confess his feelings, Haruna abruptly apologized to him, much to his shock. They decide to let it slide and feel relieved that they're not angry at each other, much to Oshizu's disappointment at her for not confessing her feelings to him. Suddenly, the Kyu-Octopuses appeared with Nana and Mea around its tentacles, including Oshizu. Then, one of them grabbed Rito and Haruna, leading him into his accidental position with her. Before Momo can make her escape from the situation they're in, one of the Kyu-Octopuses appeared in front of her.
4	"Multiplication ~From the Front and From Behind~"; Transliteration: "Multiplication ～Mae kara ushirokara～" (Japanese: Multiplication ～前から後ろから～)	November 2, 2017 (Note: Originally, this OVA was set for release on August 4, 2017, but was delayed.)
During the night, Mikan appears to let Lala know it's bath time, but she told she works on something new for an invention. During an unexpected fight at school between Nemesis, Mea, and Yami, Lala brought along a robot cat called Nyan-Nyan Copy-kun, under Ryouko's request and shows it to Rito and Haruna. When Rito tripped and bumps into the cat, it electrocuted him and ran away. Then, when Rito sneezes, a clone of himself appears. Lala informs him if he can pull the robotic cat's tail, the effects will reset. During his chase at the cat, numerous Rito copies kept populating every time he sneezes and gets into embarrassing situations with other girls, except Momo and Nemesis on the school rooftop. Celine helped Haruna find the cat which is asleep in the bushes, meaning she stopped the copying process. At night, Mikan, Lala, Momo, and Nana at home see numerous Rito clones still present until the effects wear off, Lala says that she didn't know that the copy effect would be worsening. Nana thought that it was the end of Earth. Momo says "If mecha wasn't found the Earth might have ended up covered in Rito-sans. Run wanted one for herself, for Yui's disapproval. Outside the house whole street is covered in hundreds of clones of himself. The episode cuts to black and Rito's sneeze is heard for the last time.
