= To Love Ru =

Japanese manga series

- Cover of the first manga volume, depicting Rito Yuuki (left) and Lala Satalin Deviluke (right)

To LOVE(とらぶ)る (Toraburu)
- Genre: Harem, romantic comedy, science fiction
- Manga
- Written by: Saki Hasemi
- Illustrated by: Kentaro Yabuki
- Published by: Shueisha
- English publisher: NA: Seven Seas Entertainment
- Imprint: Jump Comics
- Magazine: Weekly Shōnen Jump
- Original run: April 24, 2006 – August 31, 2009
- Volumes: 18
- Manga

To Love Ru Darkness
- Written by: Saki Hasemi
- Illustrated by: Kentaro Yabuki
- Published by: Shueisha
- English publisher: NA: Seven Seas Entertainment
- Imprint: Jump Comics SQ.
- Magazine: Jump Square
- Original run: October 4, 2010 – March 4, 2017
- Volumes: 18
Further information
Anime television series
| Directed by | Takao Kato |
| Produced by | Akihiro Kawamura; Kazuhiko Torishima; Yoshihisa Nakayama; Yukinao Shimoji |
| Written by | Akatsuki Yamatoya |
| Music by | Takeshi Watanabe |
| Studio | Xebec |
| Licensed by | AUS: Madman Entertainment; NA: Sentai Filmworks |
| Original network | TBS, MBS, CBC, BS-i, AT-X |
| English network | NA: Anime Network |
| Original run | April 4, 2008 – September 26, 2008 |
| Episodes | 26 |
Original video animation
| Directed by | Takao Kato |
| Produced by | Nobuhiro Nakayama; Takeshi Tanaka; Makoto Ōyoshi; Masanori Gotō; Hiroyuki Yonemasu; Takatoshi Chino |
| Written by | Akatsuki Yamatoya |
| Music by | Takeshi Watanabe |
| Studio | Xebec |
| Released | April 3, 2009 – April 2, 2010 |
| Runtime | 25 minutes each |
| Episodes | 6 |
Anime television series
Motto To Love Ru
| Directed by | Atsushi Ōtsuki |
| Produced by | Nobuhiro Nakayama; Takeshi Tanaka; Takumi Kusakabe |
| Written by | Yasunori Yamada |
| Music by | Takeshi Watanabe |
| Studio | Xebec |
| Licensed by | AUS: Madman Entertainment; NA: Sentai Filmworks |
| Original network | Tokyo MX, Chiba TV, SUN, TVA, AT-X |
| English network | NA: Anime Network |
| Original run | October 6, 2010 – December 22, 2010 |
| Episodes | 12 |
Original video animation
To Love Ru Darkness
| Directed by | Atsushi Ōtsuki |
| Produced by | Nobuhiro Nakayama; Tsuyoshi Tanaka; Kazumasa Sanjōba; Kentarō Hattori |
| Written by | Atsushi Ōtsuki |
| Music by | Takeshi Watanabe |
| Studio | Xebec |
| Released | August 17, 2012 – April 3, 2015 |
| Runtime | 25 minutes each |
| Episodes | 6 |
Anime television series
To Love Ru Darkness
| Directed by | Atsushi Ōtsuki |
| Produced by | Nobuhiro Nakayama; Tsuyoshi Tanaka; Kazumasa Sanjōba; Kentarō Hattori |
| Written by | Atsushi Ōtsuki |
| Music by | Takeshi Watanabe |
| Studio | Xebec |
| Licensed by | AUS: Madman Entertainment; NA: Sentai Filmworks |
| Original network | Tokyo MX, AT-X |
| English network | NA: Anime Network |
| Original run | October 6, 2012 – December 29, 2012 |
| Episodes | 12 |
Anime television series
To Love Ru Darkness 2nd
| Directed by | Atsushi Ōtsuki |
| Produced by | Nobuhiro Nakayama; Tsuyoshi Tanaka |
| Written by | Atsushi Ōtsuki |
| Music by | Takeshi Watanabe |
| Studio | Xebec |
| Licensed by | AUS: Madman Entertainment; NA: Sentai Filmworks |
| Original network | BS11, Tokyo MX, SUN, AT-X |
| English network | NA: Anime Network |
| Original run | July 7, 2015 – October 28, 2015 |
| Episodes | 14 |
Original video animation
To Love Ru Darkness 2nd
| Directed by | Atsushi Ōtsuki |
| Produced by | Nobuhiro Nakayama; Tsuyoshi Tanaka |
| Written by | Atsushi Ōtsuki |
| Music by | Takeshi Watanabe |
| Studio | Xebec |
| Released | January 4, 2016 – November 2, 2017 |
| Runtime | 10–25 minutes each |
| Episodes | 4 |
- icon

To Love Ru (Japanese: To LOVE(とらぶ)る, Hepburn: Toraburu) is a Japanese manga series written by Saki Hasemi and illustrated by Kentaro Yabuki. The manga was serialized in Shueisha's shōnen manga magazine Weekly Shōnen Jump from April 2006 to August 2009, and the chapters collected into 18 tankōbon volumes. It follows high school student Rito Yuuki after he becomes accidentally engaged to Lala Satalin Deviluke, a runaway alien princess, leading to chaotic encounters with human and alien girls while facing threats from her would-be suitors. The title is a pun on the English loan words toraburu ("trouble") and rabu ("love"), referencing the harem aspect of the series. To Love Ru is noted for its fan service, with Hasemi and Yabuki admitting that they tested the boundaries of what would be allowed in a shōnen manga.

A drama CD was released in February 2008, featuring an original story along with character songs. Following a 26-episode anime television series adaptation that aired in Japan in 2008, Xebec produced six original video animation episodes and a 12-episode second season, titled Motto To Love Ru, between 2009 and 2010. Four video games have been released for various platforms.

A continuation of the manga called To Love Ru Darkness (TO LOVE(とらぶ)る ダークネス, Toraburu Dākunesu) was serialized in Shueisha's Jump Square magazine from October 2010 to March 2017, and the chapters collected into 18 tankōbon volumes. Between 2012 and 2017, Xebec produced 10 OVA episodes and 26 anime television series episodes based on To Love Ru Darkness. The To Love Ru and To Love Ru Darkness manga series have over 16 million copies in circulation.

== Synopsis ==
=== To Love Ru ===
Set in the fictional city of Sainan (彩南), the story of To Love Ru revolves around Rito Yuuki, a shy and clumsy high-school student who cannot confess his love to the girl of his dreams, Haruna Sairenji. One day when sulking in the bathtub, a mysterious, naked devil-tailed girl appears out of nowhere. Her name is Lala Satalin Deviluke, the runaway crown princess of the planet Deviluke. Her father wants her to return home to marry one of her marriage candidates. When Devilukean commander Zastin arrives to bring her home, she swiftly declares she will marry Rito in order to stay on Earth, leading Zastin to attack Rito. But when Rito angrily declares that marriage is only possible with the person you love, the two dull-witted aliens misunderstand him, believing he truly understands Lala's feelings.

Lala quickly falls in love with him, and Zastin also approves of their engagement, much to Rito's dismay. While Zastin reports his support for the pair to Lala's father, Gid Lucion Deviluke, who is the King of Deviluke and much of the known universe, Rito reluctantly helps Lala transition to life on Earth, while gradually befriending his dream girl, Haruna, along with a colorful cast of other girls (both humans and aliens alike), such as the uptight, high-strung girl Yui Kotegawa, the sex-switching alien Run/Ren, and the queen bee Saki Tenjouin, among others. In the meantime, Rito must also fight off Lala's antagonistic alien suitors, one of whom sends the alien assassin Golden Darkness to kill him.

=== To Love Ru Darkness ===
The story continues in To Love Ru Darkness, which focuses on Lala's little sister, Momo Belia Deviluke. She and her twin sister, Nana Astar Deviluke, have since come to live with Lala in Rito's house. While Rito remains indecisive between his longtime crush on Haruna and his growing affection for Lala, Momo has also fallen in love with Rito. But not wanting to steal Rito away from her sister, Momo instead plots to build a harem of girls around Rito, hoping that if Rito marries Lala and becomes the King of Deviluke, he can legally marry every girl who is in love with him, including Momo herself. While Momo works in the background and plays matchmaker with Rito, a plethora of beautiful girls gradually enter Rito's life and warm up to his kindness, including Golden Darkness, who has since lived peacefully on Earth but struggles to escape her dark past. Thus, Rito's otherworldly love troubles continue forever.

== Production ==
=== Writing and development ===
Manga artist Kentaro Yabuki first met anime screenwriter Saki Hasemi at preliminary meetings for the 2005 anime adaptation of Yabuki's previous series, Black Cat. When Hasemi told Yabuki that he was interested in writing an original manga, the artist told Hasemi he could contact him if he had any questions. To Love Ru has origins in Yabuki's 2004 one-shot "Trans Boy". When the time came for him to create a new series, Yabuki said he "hit a brick wall". The editorial department asked him to go in a different direction, so he started asking Hasemi his opinions on things. After they started working together, Hasemi said he originally thought of doing a shōnen battle manga, but could not come up with a "hook". He then remembered that Yabuki had said he wanted to create a romantic comedy manga, and the two started to come up with ideas for one easily. Yabuki created the rough designs and personalities for Rito and Lala and then discussed what kind of story would work with them with Hasemi and their supervisor. Hasemi said that Yabuki was set on two things; having a love triangle between Rito, Lala, and Haruna, and that Rito could not be a pervert. They initially imagined the series as mainly a comedy featuring Rito and Lala, with Rito only longing for Haruna. But as they had more meetings, this changed to Haruna also being a featured character with feelings for Rito, in order to emphasize the love triangle. Hasemi said once Yabuki decided on Peke being a "robot for undressing", they could see the direction the manga was headed in.

Having only worked on anime and video games previously, Hasemi said he had trouble fitting his ideas into the 19-page-per-chapter structure of a weekly manga serialization at the beginning. The duo's initial editor, Nakamura, would often tell him that certain details he added were not going to make it into the finished chapter. Hasemi said a turning point was when Yabuki asked him not to change scenes so much. While this is a heavily used technique in anime to show momentary pauses in action or passages of time, in manga, the more scene changes there are, the more expository panels are required. The basic plan was to give each chapter a self-contained plot and have the action take place in one location. Hasemi said that the manga was hard to write for; while it can paradoxically be easier on the author to make a story more complicated and build the world, To Love Ru instead relied entirely on visuals and emotions to convey everything. Yabuki said he made sure everything was easy to read by limiting each page to a maximum of six panels, and never using distorted panels. Hasemi and Yabuki always knew they were going to make many revisions to the collected tankōbon volumes of To Love Ru. They thought it was more fun for the chapters to be different than when they were published in Weekly Shōnen Jump. It took six months for the first volume to be released, partly because Yabuki would look at his "old" art and feel compelled to "fix" it. Hasemi and Yabuki aimed from the beginning to have three or more years of serialization, on top of an anime adaptation and a video game, and Hasemi said he purposefully made the series easy to adapt into an anime. Towards the end of serialization, Yabuki was having a "hard time privately, and felt like breaking down and crying", but was happy that he was able to punctuate the final moments of the manga with the same "stupid perversion" it always had. He was happy that they were able to make the series fun up until the very end, and that they never drifted from the original premise by turning it into a serious action manga.

How to end To Love Ru was discussed over and over again in meetings, until Yabuki suggested that instead of having Rito end up with someone in particular, it could end without him choosing anyone. Although both Hasemi and Uchida, who became their editor around October or November 2007, were initially skeptical of an "ending-less ending", Hasemi told Yabuki he did not really want to end the series and came around to the idea. They wanted Rito to come to the conclusion that he loves Haruna, but purposefully did not explain why he did so. By having Lala misunderstand the situation, it connected back to the first chapter of the series. They did not know when they would find out that their next chapter would be the last; it just so happened that the characters were at the pool, which allowed them to show everyone. In an interview included in the final volume, Hasemi questioned how much they could reveal about their next manga project. To which Yabuki replied, "If they'd let us do it, it'd be To Love Ru 2!" Both creators also said that it was not really the end of the series and its world, with Yabuki stating that he personally was interested in a spinoff with Momo and Nana as the main characters.

Yabuki said that To Love Ru Darkness started as a "self-indulgent whim" of his. He drew an outline and "dragged" Hasemi back in for a spin-off. Hasemi described it as a spin-off with the intention of carrying on the original's spirit, while "adapting its relationships to a new vector of development". He said he was satisfied with how they portrayed the changes in Momo's heart, and that Lala and Haruna made romantic progress as well. Yabuki also initiated the ending of Darkness, telling Hasemi, the editor-in-chief, and all others involved around May or June 2016, the tenth anniversary of the entire franchise. He had several reasons; the events included in volume 18 finished telling everything there is to say about "the Darkness arc of Momo and Yami as we originally planned it", both the authors and the readers had become too desensitized to the sexiness, 18 volumes matches the original manga, and 10 years seemed like an ideal run. Yabuki also said he could not let To Love Ru Darkness drag on pointlessly forever, because he cares about the work. In the final volume, Hasemi described the conclusion of Darkness as being a "sort of waypoint" that leaves open the question of what really happens in the end, and both creators stated that it was not the end of To Love Ru.

=== Characters and fan service ===
Hasemi and Yabuki took care to make sure that Rito was likeable and that his actions were not unpleasant. Hasemi said that because it ran in a shōnen magazine, if boys did not like and support the protagonist, then drawing cute girls would be meaningless. They made use of Lala's alien quality by making her ignorant and curious about earth culture. She was made an inventor to be a source of comedy, and it was Hasemi who thought up her producing things from her handheld "D-Dial". Lala's open personality and lack of shame is a result of her royal upbringing, and acts as contrast with Haruna. Haruna is meant to bring a "certain charm" to the manga that Lala lacks; she is shy and can not voice her feelings. Saki was created to have a senpai character and a character from the upper class of society, who looks down on everyone and speaks her mind. Her wealth makes it easy to develop events and advance the story. Yui was created as a series regular to celebrate one year of serialization. She was given an abundance of common sense and a serious personality, making her a tsundere. In a series full of characters who lack common sense, Yui plays the "straight man" role. Yui was the character that was planned to have the most character growth, as she was the only one who would bring up the perverted stuff Rito does to them. But Yabuki said he did not expect her to turn into such a serious love interest. The artist also cited Nana and Momo as having great character development and standing out in the latter half of the series. Because the other females are all young high school students, Ryouko Mikado was introduced to inject more adult appeal into To Love Ru. The latter half of the manga features a lot more quirky and unique characters because, the newer the character, the harder Hasemi and Yabuki had to work to establish and differentiate their personality. Yabuki said that by the latter half of the series, they were treating all the female characters as main heroines. In the manga's third year, the creators thought about having the main cast move up a grade, but decided against it because Saki would have to graduate and Mikan would have to grow up.

Hasemi stated that when To Love Ru began, "there weren't any limits" on romantic comedies in Weekly Shōnen Jump. Yabuki said that at that time, he never would have imagined that lewd scenes would become the main focus of the series. As the manga went on, Yabuki said it became more and more about testing the limits as to what Weekly Shōnen Jump would allow them to draw. When there was a question on a reader survey about wanting more eroticism in the manga, it received an overwhelming response and the duo was happy to respond since they had fun creating those scenes. But heading into the second year of serialization, Hasemi said that coming up with erotic situations had become a lot more difficult. For example, having Rito accidentally fall down and touch someone had become worn out. Yabuki had to make subtle changes when that type of scene was still used, such as using a different angle or making the girl the one to fall on top of him. The artist said that by the halfway point of serialization, simply touching the girls was not enough for their readers, Rito's fingers had to end up in certain places. Uchida said that this caused every week to be a battle against the editing department. Yabuki said that drawing the nudity in To Love Ru really "sap[ped] more of my strength" than any other kind of art in the manga. On the bright side, in February 2010 the artist said he is now able to draw perverted scenes that he previously would have been too embarrassed to draw. At that same time, Uchida said that the editorial department was using Yabuki's style of drawing soft breasts as reference for newer artists.

== Publication ==
To Love Ru is written by Saki Hasemi and illustrated by Kentaro Yabuki. It was serialized in Shueisha's shōnen manga magazine Weekly Shōnen Jump between April 24, 2006, and August 31, 2009. The 162 individual chapters were collected into 18 tankōbon volumes and were published by Shueisha between November 11, 2006, and April 2, 2010. The series was republished in a 10-volume bunkoban edition between November 18, 2016, and March 17, 2017. A sequel manga, To Love Ru Darkness, was serialized between October 4, 2010, and March 4, 2017, in the monthly manga magazine Jump Square. Shueisha collected and published its 77 individual chapters in 18 volumes for Darkness from March 4, 2011, to April 4, 2017. Additionally, two bonus chapters were published in the May and June 2017 issues of Jump Square. The series was republished in a 10-volume bunkoban edition between October 16, 2020, and February 18, 2021. To celebrate Yabuki's 20th anniversary as a professional artist, a special To Love Ru story was published in Weekly Shōnen Jump on April 27, 2019. A full-color To Love Ru Darkness one-shot was published in Jump Square on May 2, 2019, for the same occasion. To commemorate an art exhibition held as a conclusion to the manga's 15th anniversary celebrations, a To Love Ru one-shot was released on the Shōnen Jump+ website on January 13, 2023. To celebrate the manga's 20th anniversary, a 25-page To Love Ru one-shot was published in the Summer 2026 issue of Jump Giga on August 17, 2026. To Love Ru Parade, a book collecting previously uncollected To Love Ru and To Love Ru Darkness one-shots, was published on October 2, 2026.

Both manga series are licensed in North America by Seven Seas Entertainment, which releases them in print and digital formats. To Love Ru was published in two-in-one omnibus volumes, while To Love Ru Darkness was released as single volumes. Both series were originally slated to begin publication in October 2017, but were later delayed to December 2017.

== Media ==
=== Anime ===
An anime television series adaptation produced by Xebec and directed by Takao Kato aired in Japan between April 4 and September 26, 2008, and contains twenty-six episodes. The anime uses characters and general themes from the original manga, it captures various chapters and events from the manga in no specific order. The anime's opening theme is "Forever We Can Make It!" by Thyme, the first ending theme for episodes one through thirteen is "Lucky Tune", (Note: ラッキーチューン, Rakkī Chūn) and the second ending theme is "Kiss no Yukue"; (Note: kiss の行方) both are sung by Anna. The anime is licensed in North America by Sentai Filmworks and distributed by Section23 Films. The complete DVD collection part one containing the first half-season was released on December 15, 2009 and part two containing the second half-season was released on February 16, 2010. Sentai released the series on Blu-ray on March 18, 2014. Sentai Filmworks later produced an English dub of the series, which began streaming on Hidive on March 27, 2020.

Three original video animation (OVA) episodes produced by Xebec and directed by Takao Kato were shipped starting on April 3, 2009, with pre-ordered copies of the manga's 13th, 14th and 15th volumes. An additional three OVA episodes were released with the bundled version of the 16th, 17th and 18th volumes. The opening theme for the OVAs is "Yatte Koi Daisuki" and the ending theme is "Apple panic"; both songs are by Haruka Tomatsu and Sayuri Yahagi, the voice actresses of Lala Satalin Deviluke and Haruna Sairenji, respectively. A second season of the anime, titled Motto To Love Ru, produced by Xebec and directed by Atsushi Ōtsuki aired 12 episodes between October 6 and December 22, 2010. The opening theme for the second season is "Loop-the-Loop" by Kotoko and the ending theme is "Baby Baby Love" by Tomatsu. Sentai Filmworks have also licensed the second season and released the complete series set on DVD on April 3, 2012; the Blu-ray set was released on May 27, 2014, and the English dub began streaming on Hidive on February 2, 2021.

Six OVA episodes of To Love Ru Darkness were produced by Xebec and released with the limited editions of the manga's 5th, 6th, 8th, 9th, 12th, and 13th volumes on DVD on August 17, 2012, December 19, 2012, August 19, 2013, December 4, 2013, December 4, 2014, and April 3, 2015, respectively. A twelve-episode anime television series adaptation was also produced by Xebec, directed by Atsushi Ōtsuki, and aired between October 6 and December 29, 2012. The opening theme for To Love Ru Darkness is "Rakuen Project" (Note: 楽園PROJECT) by Ray and the ending theme is "Foul Play ni Kurari" (Note: ファールプレーにくらり) by Kanon Wakeshima. Sentai Filmworks released To Love Ru Darkness on DVD and Blu-ray in North America on July 15, 2014. A second season of Darkness, titled To Love Ru Darkness 2nd, aired in Japan between July 7 and October 29, 2015. The opening theme is "secret arms" by Ray while the ending theme is "Gardens" by Mami Kawada. Sentai Filmworks released To Love Ru Darkness 2nd on DVD and Blu-ray in North America on November 1, 2016. Three OVA episodes of To Love Ru Darkness 2nd were produced by Xebec between January 4 and December 2, 2016. A fourth OVA episode to commemorate the 10th anniversary of To Love Ru was released on November 2, 2017, with a book titled To Love Ru Chronicles.

=== Video games ===
Five To Love Ru video games have been released. The first is a 2D and 3D visual novel on the Nintendo DS titled To Love Ru: Exciting Outdoor School Version, (Note: TO LOVE(とらぶ)る ワクワク! 林間学校編, Toraburu Waku Waku! Rinkangakkō-hen) which was released on August 28, 2008. The second is a 2D adventure visual novel on the PlayStation Portable entitled To Love Ru: Exciting Beach School Version, (Note: TO LOVE(とらぶ)る ドキドキ! 臨海学校編, Toraburu Doki Doki! Rinkaigakkō-hen) which was released on October 2, 2008. A third game, titled To Love Ru Darkness: Battle Ecstasy, (Note: TO LOVE(とらぶ)る ダークネス バトルエクスタシー, Toraburu Dākunesu Batoru Ekusutashii) was released on May 22, 2014, for the PlayStation Vita. It was developed by FuRyu, the developer of Unchained Blades. Lala Satalin Deviluke appears as a support character in the Jump crossover fighting game J-Stars Victory VS. A smartphone game titled To Love Ru Darkness: Idol Revolution (Note: TO LOVE(とらぶ)る ダークネス IDOL REVOLUTION, Toraburu Dākunesu Aidoru Revoryūshon) was released on March 19, 2014; the game was later added to the website DMM.com on May 13, 2015. A game titled To Love Ru Darkness: True Princess (Note: TO LOVE(とらぶ)る ダークネス トゥループリンセス, Toraburu Dākunesu Turū Purinsesu) was released on November 5, 2015, for the PlayStation Vita.

=== Other media ===
A drama CD for To Love Ru was released on February 29, 2008, with an original story, featuring the voice cast later used in the anime, along with character songs.

Hikaru Wakatsuki wrote two novels based on the series: To Love Ru: Dangerous Girls' Talk (Note: To LOVEる -とらぶる- 危ないガールズトーク) was published on August 3, 2009, and To Love Ru Darkness: Little Sisters (Note: To LOVEる ダークネスLittle Sisters＜りとしす＞) was published on August 17, 2012.

Three art books have been published for the two manga series; Love Color on January 4, 2010, Venus on October 9, 2012, and Harem Gold on May 2, 2016. An official data book was published on March 4, 2011, while a guidebook to Darkness was published on October 3, 2014. To Love Ru Chronicle, a special book celebrating the tenth anniversary of To Love Ru and its sequel, was published on November 2, 2017. It features tribute illustrations by artists such as Akira Toriyama, Rumiko Takahashi, Eiichiro Oda, and Hajime Isayama.

== Reception ==
=== Sales and popularity ===
To Love Ru and To Love Ru Darkness had over 16 million copies in circulation by March 2017. According to Oricon and Tohan, the collected volumes of To Love Ru consistently ranked in the top 10 best-selling manga during their first weeks of release in Japan. Volume 7 was the best-selling manga volume in its week of release, while two versions (a regular and a limited edition) of volumes 13, 15, and 17 ranked in the top 30 during their respective release weeks. Like its predecessor, the collected volumes of To Love Ru Darkness all ranked in the top 10 best-selling manga during their first weeks of release. Two versions (a regular and a limited edition) of volumes 6, 8, 9, 12, 13, 15, and 17 ranked in the top 40 during their respective release weeks. According to Oricon, To Love Ru Darkness sold 1,067,988 copies in 2011, while its fourth volume alone sold 460,543 copies in 2012. The series sold 1,558,973 copies in 2013, 437,671 of which were from volume 7. Oricon reported that in the first half of 2014, volumes 9 and 10 sold 326,208 and 334,502 copies respectively. Volume 15 of To Love Ru Darkness sold 277,118 copies in the first half of 2016, while volumes 17 and 18 sold 262,024 and 262,201 copies respectively in the first half of 2017. In November 2014, readers of Da Vinci magazine voted To Love Ru number 20 on a list of Weekly Shōnen Jump's greatest manga series of all time. In early 2018, a Goo poll of 5,322 people saw To Love Ru voted the most erotic manga in Weekly Shōnen Jump's history.

=== Critical response ===
Anime News Network had four different writers review the first two-in-one omnibus volume of To Love Ru. Lynzee Loveridge, Amy McNulty and Rebecca Silverman each gave it a 3 out of 5 rating. Loveridge described the work as pure harem and praised Yabuki's comedic artwork, but felt that the personality types of the love-triangled main characters were "retreading well worn ground." McNulty disagreed, calling Lala "refreshingly charming" and noting that Haruna does not enter tired tropes either. Silverman called Yabuki's art dynamic and attractive and recommended the series to fans of harem rom-coms, but called the plot very cliché and providing nothing new. McNulty stated that the beginning with just the original love-triangle works just fine, making the love interests added later seem unnecessary, and comes off as quaint when compared to To Love Ru Darkness. Also in comparison to the sequel, Loveridge described the original series as tame in comparison to the "thinly veiled hentai" that is To Love Ru Darkness.

Austin Price, the fourth writer, gave it a scathing review, calling the story a straight rip-off of Urusei Yatsura and claiming the jokes were ripped straight from harem comedy classics such as Ranma ½, Tenchi Muyo! and Love Hina. He also called Yabuki "the most utterly unremarkable artist in Shonen Jump's history." Stig Høgset and Tim Jones of T.H.E.M. Anime Reviews described the first season of the anime series as "a watered down Urusei Yatsura for the 21st century" and called it the worst romantic comedy they have ever seen. They mainly criticized the anime's large amounts of original material not adapted from the manga, but also noted poor animation and music. When they reviewed the Motto To Love Ru anime, Høgset and Jones felt it improved significantly as it reduces manga arcs into 7 minutes each so as to include three in each episode. They gave it 3 out of 5 stars, but stated it unfortunately focuses on the "lesser characters" too often, and their "antics will get old in 5 minutes."

=== Controversy ===
In 2012, To Love Ru Darkness was reviewed by the Tokyo Metropolitan Assembly to see if it violated their newly passed controversial Bill 156. This was after they had received a phone call from a parent who discovered a To Love Ru Darkness book while cleaning a son's room. The parent did not like that there was frontal nudity of a female character, including her lower body. At the meeting on April 9, 2012, they decided that while the book did include the aforementioned nudity, it did not violate the new ordinance. In 2014, volume 9 of To Love Ru Darkness was officially designated a "harmful publication" in Fukushima Prefecture under its "Youth Protection and Nurturing Ordinance". Throughout the second half of 2022, the Australian Classification Board refused classification for volumes 2–13 and 15 of To Love Ru Darkness for containing material that "is likely to cause offence to a reasonable adult." The decision means that the volumes "cannot be sold, hired, advertised or legally imported in Australia".
