= Saki Hasemi =

Japanese anime screenwriter and manga writer

- 長谷見 沙貴
- Born: October 25; Chiba, Japan
- Occupations: Manga author, screenwriter

Saki Hasemi (長谷見 沙貴, Hasemi Saki; born October 25) is a Japanese anime screenwriter and manga writer. He is best known for authoring the manga series To Love Ru (2006–2009) and To Love Ru Darkness (2010–2017) alongside illustrator Kentaro Yabuki. Together the two manga series have over 16 million copies in circulation.

== Career ==
In the 1980s and 1990s, Saki worked in the video game industry. He first met manga artist Kentaro Yabuki at preliminary meetings for the 2005 anime adaptation of Yabuki's Black Cat. When Saki told Yabuki that he was interested in writing an original manga, the artist told Saki he could contact him if he had any questions. But it was Yabuki who reached out to him to work on what would become To Love Ru. To Love Ru was serialized in Weekly Shōnen Jump from April 24, 2006, to August 31, 2009, and its sequel To Love Ru Darkness was serialized in Jump Square from October 4, 2010, to March 4, 2017. Both series received multiple anime adaptations and have been released in North America.

In the December 2020 issue of ASCII Media Works' Dengeki Maoh manga magazine, it was announced that Saki and artist Wise Speak would launch a manga series titled GT-Girl on November 27, 2020.

== Works ==
=== Video games ===
- Zero4 Champ – vehicle illustration
- Zero4 Champ II – vehicle illustration
- The Great Battle Pocket – character design
- Mini 4 Boy – character design, planning
- Mini 4 Boy II – character design, scenario writer
- Little Busters Q – screenplay, planning
- Ojamajo Adventure: Naisho no Mahou – screenplay, planning
- Nuga-Cel!
- Motto Nuga-Cel!
- Tengi Sosei Strike Girls / Gorgeous Maiden Girls Striker – scenario supervision
- Honey x Blade / Honey x Blade 2 – scenario supervision
- Detariki Z Tokubetsu Bōei-kyoku Taiin no Nichijō – scenario supervision

=== Anime ===
- Sugar Sugar Rune – Script (episodes 5, 12, 21, and 36)
- Black Cat – Script (episodes 3, 4, 5, 9, 13, 14, 18, and 19)
- Powerpuff Girls Z – Script (episodes 2, 12, 23, 25, 41, and 48)
- Pinky:St – Series Composition
- Moetan – Series Composition
- To Love Ru (TV) – Original creator
- To Love Ru (OVA) – Original creator
- Motto To Love Ru – Original creator
- To Love Ru Darkness (TV) – Original creator
- To Love Ru Darkness (OVA) – Original creator
- To Love Ru Darkness 2nd (TV) – Original creator
- To Love Ru Darkness 2nd (OVA) – Original creator

=== Manga ===
- To Love Ru (To LOVEる -とらぶる-, To LOVEru -Toraburu-) (with Kentaro Yabuki; 2006–2009 Shueisha) – Story
- To Love Ru Darkness (To LOVEる -とらぶる- ダークネス, To LOVEru -Toraburu- -Dākunesu-) (with Kentaro Yabuki; 2010–2017 Shueisha) – Story
- Star + One! (スタプラ! NG♪, Star Plus One + Next Generation) (with Kotarō Shōno; 2013–2014 Gakken Plus) – Story
- GT-Girl (stylized as GT-giRl, with Wise Speak; 2020–2022 ASCII Media Works) – Story
