= Kentaro Yabuki =

Japanese manga artist (born 1980)

Kentaro Yabuki 矢吹 健太朗
- Born: February 4, 1980 (age 46) Okayama, Japan
- Areas: Manga artist; illustrator; author
- Notable works: Black Cat; To Love Ru; To Love Ru Darkness; Ayakashi Triangle
- Collaborators: Saki Hasemi; Tomohiro Matsu
- Children: 3

Kentaro Yabuki (Japanese: 矢吹 健太朗, Hepburn: Yabuki Kentarō; born February 4, 1980) is a Japanese manga artist, best known for his series Black Cat (2000–2004) and for illustrating To Love Ru (2006–2009) and To Love Ru Darkness (2010–2017) alongside author Saki Hasemi. Yabuki also wrote and illustrated the series Ayakashi Triangle (2020–2023). His mentor was Takeshi Obata, the illustrator of Hikaru no Go, Death Note and Bakuman.

== Overview ==
Yabuki has stated that everything he learned about drawing manga, he learned from Akira Toriyama's Dragon Ball. He even admitted that his first publication in Jump was not his own work but actually an illustration combining, or rather fusing together, its characters Gohan and Trunks that he sent in to a 1995 contest and won a prize for. At the age of 18, he worked as an assistant to Takeshi Obata on Hikaru no Go.

Yabuki's first serialized manga, Yamato Gensōki, briefly ran in Weekly Shōnen Jump in 1998. His first popular series, Black Cat, was serialized in the same magazine between July 2000 and June 2004. It sold over 12 million copies in Japan and was adapted into an anime television series by Gonzo. Both were released in North America. Upon its ending, Yabuki expressed desire to make a sequel or make its characters reappear in another work. Yabuki then teamed up with Saki Hasemi and illustrated the Weekly Shōnen Jump series To Love Ru (2006–2009) while Hasemi wrote it. It was released in North America and adapted into several anime television series and original video animations (OVAs), which have also been released internationally.

Yabuki's one-shot "Futagami Double" was published in the January 4, 2010, issue of Weekly Shōnen Jump. That month, he began illustrating a manga adaptation of Tomohiro Matsu's Mayoi Neko Overrun! light novel series for Jump SQ. before it was transferred to Jump SQ.19 in August 2010. In October 2010, Yabuki and Hasemi began To Love Ru Darkness in Jump SQ.. In August 2011 the editorial department suddenly announced that Mayoi Neko Overrun! had ended without giving an explanation. To Love Ru Darkness ran until 2017 and, like the original, the sequel series was released in North America and adapted into several anime television series and OVAs, which have also been released internationally. Together, the To Love Ru and To Love Ru Darkness manga series have over 16 million copies in circulation.

In 2014, Yabuki began providing the illustrations for a different Matsu light novel series, Hatena Illusion. But the fourth installment released in November 2015 became the last due to Matsu's death in 2016. However, a series titled Hatena Illusion R began in 2019, and Yabuki continues his role as illustrator of the novels. From 2018 to 2020, he illustrated a manga adaptation of the Darling in the Franxx anime for the Shōnen Jump+ website and app. Yabuki's one-shot "Leo × Leo" was published in Weekly Shōnen Jump on February 9, 2019, as part of the magazine's Valentine's Day celebrations. He launched the manga series Ayakashi Triangle in the June 15, 2020, issue of Weekly Shōnen Jump. On April 25, 2022, the series transferred to Shōnen Jump+ where it continued until September 25, 2023.

== Personal life ==
Yabuki said he was born in Okayama but "formed [his] personality" in Kōchi. Yabuki and his first wife were divorced as of June 2009. They have a daughter. In August 2015, Yabuki announced in the September 2015 issue of Jump SQ. that he had gotten remarried. He is the brother-in-law of fellow manga artist Kenta Shinohara. Yabuki has two sons.

Yabuki was an extra in the 2003 movie Godzilla: Tokyo S.O.S., running through the streets of Roppongi Hills.

== Works ==
=== Manga ===
==== Serials ====
- Yamato Gensōki (邪馬台幻想記; 1998)
- Black Cat (2000–2004)
- To Love Ru (To LOVEる, Toraburu; 2006–2009) – Illustrator, written by Saki Hasemi
- Mayoi Neko Overrun! (迷い猫オーバーラン!, Mayoi Neko Ōbāran!; 2010) – Illustrator, written by Tomohiro Matsu
- To Love Ru Darkness (To LOVEる ダークネス, Toraburu Dākunesu; 2010–2017) – Illustrator, written by Saki Hasemi
- Darling in the Franxx (ダーリン・イン・ザ・フランキス, Dārin in za Furankisu; 2018–2020) – Original concept by Code:000
- Ayakashi Triangle (あやかしトライアングル, Ayakashi Toraianguru; 2020–2023)

==== One-shots ====
- "Moon Dust" (1997)
- "Yamato Gensōki" (1998)
- "Yamato Gensōki" (1998)
- "Stray Cat" (1999)
- "Trans Boy" (2004)
- "Futagami Double" (フタガミ☆ダブル, Futagami Daburu; 2010)
- "Leo × Leo" (れお×レオ, Reo Reo; 2019)

=== Other work ===
- Jigen Bakuju (時限爆呪; 1999) – Illustrations, light novel written by Kaya Kizaki
- Hatena Illusion (はてな☆イリュージョン, Hatena☆Iryūjon; 2014–2015) – Illustrations, light novel series written by Tomohiro Matsu
- Hatena Illusion R (はてな☆イリュージョンR; 2019–present) – Illustrations, light novel series written by Tomohiro Matsu and StoryWorks
- One Piece Card Game (2026) – Illustrated Nami for a One Piece: Heroines card with two variants
