= Tearju Lunatique =

Tearju Lunatique may refer to:

- Tearju Lunatique, a character from the manga/anime Black Cat
- Tearju Lunatique, a character from the manga/anime To Love-Ru
