= To Love Ru season 1 =

To Love Ru
- Season 1
- The first DVD volume compilation cover of the first season of To Love Ru.
- No. of episodes: 26

Release
- Original network: JNN (TBS, MBS, CBC, BS-i), AT-X
- Original release: April 4 – September 26, 2008

Season chronology
- Next → Motto

To Love Ru is an anime series based on the manga of the same name written by Saki Hasemi and illustrated by Kentaro Yabuki. Produced by Xebec and directed by Takao Kato, the first season of the anime series aired in Japan between April 4 and September 26, 2008. While the first season uses characters and general themes from the original manga, a large majority of episodes in this season is anime original and did not adapt much from its source material manga. The anime's opening theme is "Forever We Can Make It!" by Thyme while the first ending theme from episodes 1–13 & 26 is "Lucky Tune" (ラッキーチューン, Rakkī Chūn), and the second ending theme from episodes 14–25 is "Kiss no Yukue" (kiss の行方); both are sung by Anna.

The anime is licensed in North America by Sentai Filmworks and distributed by Section23 Films. The complete DVD collection part one containing the first half-season was released on December 15, 2009 and part two containing the second half-season was released on February 16, 2010. Sentai released the series on Blu-ray on March 18, 2014.

== Episode list ==
No.	Title	Directed by	Written by	Storyboarded by	Original release date
1	"The Girl Who Fell From the Sky"; Transliteration: "Maiorita Shōjo" (Japanese: 舞い降りた少女)	Taketomo Ishikawa	Akatsuki Yamatoya	Kato Takao	April 4, 2008
Rito Yūki is a fifteen-year-old boy who has tried to confess to the girl whom he loves, Haruna Sairenji, numerous times but has been unable to do so through the strangest of circumstances. Meanwhile, a mysterious extraterrestrial girl named Lala Satalin Deviluke runs away to Earth in order to avoid daily arranged marriage candidate interviews set up by her father, the king of her home planet, Deviluke, as well as Emperor of the Milky Way Galaxy and Ruler of the known universe. Using one of her own inventions, she teleports naked into Rito's bathtub, where he accidentally gropes her breasts. It is later revealed to him that this is equivalent to a marriage proposal on Deviluke, and Lala happily accepts that she is to become Rito's future bride because Rito tried to save her from her uncle Zastin who came on the order of her father to bring Lala back home. Rito, on the other hand, due to his feelings for Haruna, does not want anything to do with Lala.
2	"A Broken Engagement!?"; Transliteration: "Kon'yaku Kaishō!?" (Japanese: 婚約解消!?)	Yukio Kuroda	Akatsuki Yamatoya	Akira Nishimori	April 11, 2008
Rito discovers from Zastin, Lala's uncle and leader of her personal guard, that if he were to back out of his engagement with Lala, he would be killed and Lala's father would destroy the Earth. Rito hypothetically asks him if it were somehow possible to back out of his engagement and not suffer the repercussions. Zastin tells him that he must feel up Lala's breasts once more within the first three days of his engagement in order to call it off. While he attempts many times to touch Lala's breasts, he does not make it in time and thus is stuck with the engagement. The next day while at school, a new transfer student is announced to the class. Just as Rito is thinking that school is the only place that he can breathe anymore, Lala is brought into class and all of Rito's hopes of a quiet school life fall apart.
3	"Love Triangle"; Transliteration: "Sankaku Kankei" (Japanese: 三角関係)	Akihiro Enomoto	Akatsuki Yamatoya	Akihiro Enomoto	April 18, 2008
Rito is devastated to hear from Haruna that she thinks he and Lala are suited for each other. At home, his younger sister Mikan notices Rito's depressed look and suggests that they should go out the next day to show Lala around town. While out, Lala's Artificial intelligence clothing device named Peke loses most of her energy, and due to this, Lala's clothes start dissolving. They head into a store and buy her new clothes, and while there run into Haruna. Together with Haruna, they go to the aquarium, but their visit is cut short when Lala makes a disturbance which floods the building.
4	"A Love Apron From Outer Space"; Transliteration: "Uchū no Rabu Epuron" (Japanese: 宇宙のLOVEエプロン)	Takeshi Nagasawa	Katsuhiko Chiba	Takeshi Nagasawa	April 25, 2008
Rito gets scared when Zastin tells him that by marrying Lala he will one day become King of Deviluke and that he will have to participate in an interstellar war. That night, Lala cooks but the food is dreadful. In an effort to try to get out of one day participating in wars, Rito claims he will not marry Lala if she cannot cook. Lala quickly leaves and goes back into space, but appears again the next day at school with the intention of cooking something good for Rito. She collected ingredients from all over the galaxy which is still alive and wreak havoc in the school. Lala later explains to Rito that he does not have to go to war if he does not want to, and even her father has not participated in battles for some time. To further reassure him, Lala tells him that after they get married, she intends to live with him on Earth.
5	"The Queen's Challenge"; Transliteration: "Kuīn no Chōsenjō" (Japanese: くいーんの挑戦状)	Yukio Kuroda	Kento Shimoyama	DOJAG-A-GEN	May 2, 2008
A pretty, rich girl named Saki Tenjouin comes back to school and finds that all the boys prefer Lala over herself, which angers her greatly. She gives Lala a letter challenging her to a beauty contest, and, to make sure she shows up, kidnaps Rito as bait. He is warned by Saki that if Lala fails to show up in time, he will be forced to touch Saki's breasts in front of the entire school. Lala eventually shows up, but Bow-Bow Doggie-Kun, a dog-like robot created by Lala, rips off Saki's swimsuit, exposing her naked body to everyone and making her run away out of shame. Later, Saki catches the word that Lala might have a great secret, so she goes undercover to Rito’s house in order to find out and reveal the secret as payback for her humiliation. However, she triggers a bunch of traps around the house (which were placed by Zastin) and falls into a trapdoor that leads her to Rito's room. There, Saki accidentally hits a switch (which was also placed by Zastin) that ejects the room into space, with her and Lala inside. With the two of them sent flying off towards space, Zastin and his men take off in pursuit, only to be inadvertently shot down by Lala, which causes Saki to fall off the room, but Lala dives out and manages to save Saki, who, despite being deeply touched by this act of altruism, passes out. Shortly after, Saki wakes up to find herself fully naked in front of a crowd of people; Bow-Bow Doggie-Kun has ripped off all her clothes while she was unconscious. Publicly embarrassed, Saki once again blames Lala, who is flying around the city looking for her.
6	"The Alien Assassin"; Transliteration: "Uchūjin no Shikaku" (Japanese: 宇宙人の刺客)	Hideya Takahashi	Yoshio Urasawa	Shinsuke Terazawa	May 9, 2008
Ghi Buree, a shapeshifting alien, comes to propose to Lala. Knowing that Rito actually likes Haruna, he changes himself into the principal and takes Haruna hostage in the gym equipment room. He lures Rito there and offers to return Haruna if Rito cancels his engagement with Lala. Rito does not accept, divining Buree's true intentions. Lala later finds Rito and makes her disapproval of Ghi Buree's actions known, causing him to transform into a more intimidating monster. Rito surprisingly defeats Ghi Buree with his voice, revealing Ghi Buree to be a weak, cowardly alien who already has several wives and families.
7	"All Men Should Be Like This!"; Transliteration: "Otoko to wa Kaku Arubeshi!" (Japanese: 男とはかくあるべし)	Masayuki Matsumoto	Akatsuki Yamatoya	Harume Kosaka	May 16, 2008
A childhood friend of Lala, Ren Elsie Jewelria, arrives on Earth claiming he is the only one manly enough to marry Lala. He constantly attempts to impress Lala by showing off his strength, speed, and looks, but all his efforts are in vain. After failing many times, Ren asks Rito how he is able to be manly enough for Lala, and in the process is hit from behind by a frisbee and accidentally kisses Rito. Ren watches Pocky (a spoof on Rocky), an inspirational story of how to be a man, and he works out non-stop in order to get Lala to love him. Eventually, Ren completes a 120-kilometer marathon and goes to Lala to hear her finally tell him how manly he is. However, at the moment Lala is confessing his manliness, he sneezes, causing him to turn into Run, a girl. Apparently, whenever Ren sneezes, his body and mind change genders into the innocent Run, and vice versa, an inherent ability of his species.
8	"The Prefect of Spotless Integrity"; Transliteration: "Seiren Keppaku Fūki Iin" (Japanese: 清廉潔白風紀委員)	Naoyoshi Kusaka	Kento Shimoyama	DOJAG-A-GEN	May 23, 2008
After the usual morning commotion involving Rito falling foul of Lala's inventions, accidentally tackling Haruna, being tackled in turn by Run who has now fallen in love with Rito after the kiss they shared while she was Ren and Saki trying to steal Rito away to once again proving her superiority, a fellow school student, Yui Kotegawa has had enough of the "ecchi" in the school. Not only does she try to clean it up, but she forms a squad to enforce new school rules and to check on the students' behavior. Yui believes that Rito is behind all the "ecchi" in school and forbids him from talking to any girl for 2 weeks. However, she soon notices that there is still ecchi in the school, even with Rito out of the way. She then begins to wonder if she had blamed Rito incorrectly. Yui follows Rito as he leaves their school and realizes that he is a kindhearted person. She then cancels his punishment. Meanwhile, Lala is throwing a party for Rito to cheer him up. She uses her machine to get him there, but as he is being pulled by the machine, Yui is brought along with him accidentally. The next day, Rito accidentally knocks Peke off of Lala causing her clothes to disappear. When Yui sees this, she gives Rito another punishment.
9	"From a Shining Star, With Love"; Transliteration: "Hikariboshi yori Ai o Komete" (Japanese: 光星より愛を込めて)	Akihiro Enomoto	Katsuhiko Chiba	Akihiro Enomoto	May 30, 2008
Pikari, a man equipped with an armoured rocket suit, comes for Lala. Pikari tries to attack Lala and take her with him back to his homeland but fails when Lala fights back and damages his rocket suit, resulting in him being unable to return home. He walks the streets at night and asks Ren and Zastin for advice. Zastin gives him directions to a hospital run by Ryouko Mikado where she heals him. Now recovered, he makes his final attempt in kidnapping Lala by paralyzing her while restraining Rito. Ryouko witnesses the incident and mummifies him before letting Lala launch Pikari back to his homeland without her.
10	"A Space Entertainer"; Transliteration: "Uchū no Onna Geinin" (Japanese: 宇宙の女芸人)	Takeshi Nagasawa	Yoshio Urasawa	Takeshi Nagasawa	June 6, 2008
Stella, the president of Lala's fan club on Deviluke, comes to take Lala away for an idol CD debut, but Lala refuses because she enjoys Earth and wants to be with Rito. Stella blames Rito for creating this issue and demands that Rito find her a 'golden egg' to substitute Lala. Rito tries to stop her when the president fixates on Haruna being the golden egg. After stopping Stella's attempts at kidnapping Haruna, Rito proposes a better solution. Later that night, Mikan offers to be a substitute, giving Stella the idea of having Mikan, Rito, and Lala as a trio. When all seems to be going well, Stella is forced to return quickly when an audit reveals that her fan club evaded tax payments.
11	"Golden Darkness"; Transliteration: "Konjiki no Yami" (Japanese: 金色の闇)	Yukio Kuroda	Katsuhiko Chiba	DOJAG-A-GEN	June 12, 2008
Golden Darkness, an assassin, comes to earth having been paid by a client to kill Rito. Rito meets her and offers her a taiyaki. Golden Darkness identifies Rito and attacks him. Zastin comes to the rescue but is defeated. Lala fights as well, making Golden Darkness question the facts she was given about Rito's character. Lala tries to correct Golden Darkness, but Lacospo arrives, revealing himself as the client. His intent was to have Golden Darkness kill Rito so that he could propose to Lala. Lala tells Golden Darkness not to be deceived by Lacospo, but Lacospo fights back with a large alien frog. Lala and Rito defeat the frog, but Golden Darkness still considers Rito to be her target.
12	"A Frightening Field Day!"; Transliteration: "Senritsu Taiikusai" (Japanese: 戦慄体育祭)	Michita Shiraishi	Kento Shimoyama	Amino Tetsuro	June 20, 2008
A perverted day for Rito at a sports festival; he can't seem to avoid accidentally touching Haruna and he thinks she hates him. The contests don't make sense and the principal starts out having the girls doing sexy body exercises, which ends up costing him. Later the girls end up dealing with a number of strange events that turn field day into a day of weirdness. The day only gets worse and worse for Rito.
13	"The Greatest Man in the Universe"; Transliteration: "Uchūichi no Otoko" (Japanese: 宇宙一の男)	Naoyoshi Kusaka	Akatsuki Yamatoya	DOJAG-A-GEN	June 27, 2008
The day starts out like any other day for Rito, face-to-face with Lala in his bed. Zastin comes to Rito's house to tell him that Lala's father is coming to see him make sure he is worthy of marrying Lala. Throughout the day Rito worries about what Lala's father looks like and can't get it out of his mind. Today at school all of the girls that have appeared throughout the other episodes seem to make his day "interesting." Rito gets called to the roof to speak with another girl who is mysteriously seen a couple of times throughout the start of this episode, but after he gets done talking to her he hears a man's voice. The woman was a test arranged by Lala's father to see if Rito was worthy, and he has failed. A small boy appears before Rito. He doesn't believe that this is Lala's father who soon shows why he is the ruler of the galaxy. Lala runs to the roof before anything can happen and saves Rito. After seeing his daughter protecting Rito and telling her why she loves him, King Deviluke challenges Rito to become the number one man in the galaxy. Rito goes home and thinks this over and decides that he is going to do it.
14	"A Secret Between the Two of Us"; Transliteration: "Futari dake no Himitsu" (Japanese: ふたりだけの秘密)	Taketomo Ishikawa	Akatsuki Yamatoya	Taketomo Ishikawa	July 4, 2008
After thinking about what Lala's father said to him and the challenge that lies ahead, he brainstorms ideas on how to become the number one man in the galaxy. He starts training and meets Haruna, walking her dog, Maron, during his first run. After explaining to Haruna that he must change, she decides to cheer him on, meeting every day during his runs. His goal to change also affects Haruna, who eventually asks him on a date to eat lunch together at the river bank. During that time, Haruna's dog chases a bird and falls into the river. After Rito saves him, the two go to Haruna's house to clean Rito's wet clothes. While waiting for his clothes to dry (Rito ends up wearing a towel), the two talk about their middle school days. When Haruna was about to go to check if Rito's clothes were dry, she trips. They almost kiss, only to have Haruna's older sister walk in on them, and another awkward situation becomes more awkward when Rito's towel falls off.
15	"Princess of the Jungle"; Transliteration: "Mitsurin no Purinsesu" (Japanese: 密林のプリンセス)	Yukio Kuroda	Katsuhiko Chiba	Akira Nishimori	July 11, 2008
At school, Zastin accidentally reveals that Lala is an alien, though to Rito's surprise everyone takes it rather well. Zastin then takes Lala, Rito, and also Haruna, into space to be ambassadors of peace. They meet an alien, Prince Carter from the planet Burroughs, who invites them on a hunt at a secret underground alien hunting preserve in the jungles of Guyana. The one with the most success on the hunt wins the title of the Greatest Hunter in the Universe. They encounter dinosaurs, Amazons who wish to marry Rito, and a giant gorilla "Ginga Kong" which Haruna tames. In the end, Haruna wins the title of the Greatest Hunter in the Universe.
16	"Run's Surprise Confession"; Transliteration: "Run no Totsugeki Kokuhaku Taimu" (Japanese: ルンの突撃告白タイム)	Akihiro Enomoto	Kento Shimoyama	Akihiro Enomoto	July 19, 2008
The episode begins as Rito and all his schoolmates go to a water park. Run believes it's her time to make a move and further her relationship with Rito. She attempts many times throughout the episode to obtain Rito's attention, such as trying to lure him towards her with a fishing pole, sneaking up behind him as he's bringing back ice cream, using a vacuum to pull him away from a waterslide, and even by using fiber-eating fish to eat away each of the girls' bikini tops in order to scare them away from Rito. All attempts fail, however, sending Run into a state of depression. She encounters Montemitsu who then buys her food. Run then encounters Rito's teacher, that he teach her the ways of becoming famous, for Run now decides she wants to become a famous idol. After rigorous training, Run decides it's too hard of a feat to accomplish. When she is attacked by some people, Rito shows up to save her. Lala defeats the attackers using one of her inventions. The episode closes as everyone leaves the water park, and Run states that her fight for love has only begun.
17	"The Ghost in the Old School Building"; Transliteration: "Kyūkōsha no Yūrei" (Japanese: 旧校舎の幽霊)	Hideya Takahashi	Yoshio Urasawa	Hideya Takahashi	July 25, 2008
A haunted school building is shown at the episode's beginning. Lala, Risa, Mio, and a frightened Haruna are seen conversing about ghosts and monsters. Lala then suggests that the four of them and Rito should go explore the haunted house. As they all enter the building, a lock closes behind them. They continue to explore the old school and hear what sounds like approaching footsteps. Rito notices Haruna's fright and tries to leap at the approaching figure, only to find out it's Yami (Golden Darkness). They then hear a piano which chases after them. Yami slices the piano into pieces and everything seems alright. But then a skeleton and a disfigured-looking human appear, constantly saying "get out". An octopus creature appears, which frightens Haruna to such an extent that she uses Rito as a weapon and deals a mighty blow to the creature's head. The other monsters then show themselves to the group, but this time without hostility. They explain to the group that they are aliens from other downsized planets that have gathered in the old building. Ryouko appears and tries to help the monsters find a job in order to make a living for themselves. Also, a ghost girl named Oshizu appears and explains everything about herself to the group. Ryouko and the monsters appear again to tell the group that the person they talked to only wants to hire female monsters, which none of the monsters are. Oshizu then teaches them how to be more feminine, and the monsters are then hired. Lala, Rito, Yami, and Ryouko are then invited to a party where all the monsters are. The episode closes as Lala and Rito are astonished to see Zastin attending the party.
18	"Saruyama, the Gift"; Transliteration: "Saruyama ga Omiyage" (Japanese: 猿山がお土産)	Naoyoshi Kusaka	Yoshio Urasawa	DOJAG-A-GEN	August 1, 2008
Ryouko hears a spaceship flying towards the roof of the school and decides to check it out. It turns out it is a package for Lala, so Ryouko tells Lala to check it out. Lala, Rito, and Kenichi Saruyama go to the school roof to check out the package, and as Lala opens it, a giant cat jumps out and attempts to kill Lala. The cat then suffers stomach pains and explains that she's pregnant and that she accepted a mission to kill Lala before she knew her pregnancy would become a problem. Rito, Saruyama, and Lala are appalled to hear this, and so they take the cat mother to the school infirmary. Saruyama is then left in charge of taking care of her while she's giving birth. Lala believes the cat mother deserves a souvenir as a gift for her child's birth. The cat's mother then tells Lala that she wants Saruyama as her gift. After hearing this, Saruyama angrily declines. Lala tells Risa and Mio about Saruyama becoming a gift for the cat, and so they decide to dress him up as a fish so he'll look like a more memorable souvenir. They take Saruyama to the cat to show her that he's ready to be taken with her. The cat then asks if Saruyama is going out with another girl because if he is, she believes his happiness is important and doesn't wish to interfere with his relationship. Lala says he isn't, but Saruyama quickly declines and takes advantage of this moment to find a girl quickly as an excuse to not be taken as a souvenir. All the girls in the school reject him, however, except for Haruna who tries to help him. As Saruyama asks Haruna to go out with him, Rito becomes jealous and stops Saruyama from using Haruna. Now incredibly desperate for an excuse, Saruyama finds a dog outside which he uses as his excuse. As he goes back to the infirmary to show the cat's mother his newly acquired girlfriend, Lala tells them that she left with her baby because she wants Saruyama to be happy. Saruyama cries from hearing this and then discovers the dog he found was actually a male.
19	"Hell's Hot Springs: Alien Girls and Colorful Exposed Bodies"; Transliteration: "Jigoku Onsen Onna Uchūjin Nanairo Porori" (Japanese: 地獄温泉女宇宙人七色ポロリ)	Mikuri Kyosuke	Katsuhiko Chiba	Masahiko Ohta	August 8, 2008
Lala is seen watching a commercial on TV about the Tsumata Misami Hot Springs. She then tells Rito that she wants her own hot spring. Rito finds Lala attempting to build something in their yard. Lala then asks Rito to go get her a drink, so Rito heads to the store where he is suddenly attacked by Yami as a test. Rito tells her that Lala is back at home building something; after hearing this, Yami leaves. When Rito returns, he finds that Lala constructed a large drill machine which she intends to use to dig underground and hopefully find a hot spring. Mio, Risa, Ryouko, Yami, Haruna, and Saruyama are all invited to join Rito and Lala dig underground. As they travel, they find Tokugawa's hidden treasure and the entrance to Atlantis, which Lala nonchalantly passes by due to there being no hot springs nearby. They eventually come across what is known as the Seven Colored Hot Springs due to the water appearing as seven different colors. All the girls enjoy using the big and spacious springs, while Saruyama and Rito are stuck using a very small and cramped one. Saruyama decides to get out of the small spring and mess with the girls in the other hot springs. Rito soon follows and sees Saruyama chasing after Risa and Mio, which Rito then tells him to stop. They come across Ryouko and Yami, who then punches them both with her hair stating that she hates ecchi people. Lala then tells Haruna she needs to leave the spring to try to find a hot spring she can bring back to Rito's house. Rito then finds Haruna and they try to start a conversation which is interrupted by Lala who tells them that they need to leave quickly because she accidentally hit an underground volcano. They come across a civilization of moles who seek to rule the Earth's surface, but the moles are then killed by the flowing magma, and everyone returns safely to the surface.
20	"Explosive Heat Magical Girl Kyouko Flame"; Transliteration: "Bakunetsu Shōjo Majikaru Kyōko Fureimu" (Japanese: 爆熱少女 マジカルキョーコ炎)	Yukio Kuroda	Yoshio Urasawa	DOJAG-A-GEN	August 15, 2008
After learning that the afro-inflicting General Mojack is attempting to take over the world, Kyouko Kirisaki takes it upon herself to stop him and changes into Magical Kyouko Flame. Kyoko thwarts Mojack's plan who later returns with his mother to exact revenge on Kyoko. In doing so, General Mojack's mother and father reunite and use this festive opportunity to once again attempt to destroy Kyouko. In the end, there is a three-way struggle between Mojack's attempts to take over the world, Kyouko's actions to burning everything to save it, and the fire chief's efforts to keep the district safe. From the couch, Rito must suffer through watching this episode as Lala finds it thrilling.
21	"A Chronicle of Bloodshed at the Yuuki Inn"; Transliteration: "Yūkitei Keppūroku" (Japanese: 結城亭血風録)	Naoyoshi Kusaka	Katsuhiko Chiba	DOJAG-A-GEN	August 22, 2008
Ryouko and Galaxy Network’s editor, Kimio, tempt Rito with the prospect of running Earth’s only (and potentially the galaxy’s best) alien hotel. The old school building is chosen as the location for the hotel. After Lala calls upon Zastin and her other bodyguards to help rebuild the dilapidated building, the Yuuki Pavilion opens and begins accepting customers. While the number of customers increases, Rito finds himself overrun and is quickly becoming exhausted; as a result, he begins to recruit help from Oshizu, the ghost inhabiting the building, Yami, who works as a maid in order to stay for free, and his sister Mikan who will be the chef for the inn. As the number of customers eventually dwindles to zero, a large group of miniature samurai-like men, from the planet Ako, begin to arrive. During repeated attempts to develop an attack plan on the planet Deviluke, they are repeatedly interrupted by Rito's attempts to offer them food and a bath. Eventually, the leader accepts an offer of tea while he is in the midst of using a hologram to show the systems outlying Deviluke. When one of his men tries to hide the hologram, he responds by saying, "Don't mind it. The primitive people of Earth won't understand what it is." Lala, however, immediately recognizes the planet on display which leads to a confrontation between the samurai and Rito, Lala, Yami, Zastin, and the bodyguards. In the end, the inn is destroyed and with it, Rito's dreams of being the galaxy's best alien hotel are lost.
22	"A Frightening School Festival!"; Transliteration: "Senritsu! Bunkasai" (Japanese: 戦慄!文化祭)	Shigeru Ueda	Akatsuki Yamatoya	Akira Nishimori	August 29, 2008
After reflecting on her experiences on Earth, Yami reminds herself that she’s an assassin and decides to look for a job. At school, Yui tries to coordinate what her class is going to do for the culture festival and gives only two options, a calligraphy display or a regional research exhibit, much to everyone’s disappointment. Saruyama takes the lead and the class chooses to take on an animal cafe for their project. The class prepares for Culture Day as Yami continues to look for work in the assassination. When she fails to find employment, she returns to the school in time to help with the animal cafe.
23	"Saruyama’s Tales of the Inner Chambers"; Transliteration: "Saruyama no Ōoku Monogatari" (Japanese: 猿山の大奥物語)	Akihiro Enomoto	Yoshio Urasawa	Akihiro Enomoto	September 5, 2008
After watching Rito and all the girls around him, Saruyama becomes jealous of his popularity and wishes he was a noble in Edo Castle. He then has daydreams of his many adventures as the ruler of Edo Castle, where all his friends make appearances.
24	"With Shyness"; Transliteration: "Hajirai Nagara" (Japanese: はじらいながら)	Yukio Kuroda	Katsuhiko Chiba	DOJAG-A-GEN	September 12, 2008
Lala starts acting weird one morning and is diagnosed with a fever that causes her to change her personality every day. Rito has to deal with a new personality each day while waiting for her medicine to arrive and has to thwart a plan to take over the world constructed by a harsh, dictator-like Deviluke princess.
25	"The Earth's Final Night"; Transliteration: "Chikyū Saigo no Yoru" (Japanese: 地球最後の夜)	Naoyoshi Kusaka	Akatsuki Yamatoya	DOJAG-A-GEN	September 19, 2008
After taking back his daughter, the King of Deviluke sends Zastin to deliver a message to Rito. Rito finds out that, the next day, he needs to board the Devilukean spaceship to prove he is really number one in the Universe. He confesses his feelings to Haruna, and takes off the next day to board the spaceship, with the citizens of Japan, and Earth, cheering for him. Eventually, he comes across a dangerous plant that grows extremely fast. He manages to run away, but cannot do so forever and gets caught. However, an SUV comes and Kotegawa saves Rito, only to hit him again for a misunderstanding. Mikado drives the SUV towards the spaceship and the episode is left at a cliffhanger.
26	"Lala"; Transliteration: "Rara" (Japanese: ララ)	Atsushi Otsuki	Akatsuki Yamatoya	Takeshi Nagasawa	September 26, 2008
The SUV is halted due to a huge hole in the ground. They are picked up by Saki in her helicopter. However, it is sent plummeting to the ground from an air assault. Saved by Golden Darkness, they continue their race. They are stopped by slimes, but with the help of his companions, Rito manages to get past them. He then encounters these alien plants which release a gas; sending him into a dream state. Nearly losing to the dream, he is awoken by the voice of Haruna. He finishes the race, and in a turn of events, he finds himself marrying Lala. Lala however, drops the marriage, saying she wanted to consider Rito's feelings. Wanting to start over, Lala brings out a new gadget and erases everyone's memories of her. However, the following day, when she transfers to the school, she is greeted by her class. Like all her other inventions, this gadget was faulty, and everyone was able to keep their memories of her.
