= Mikan Yuuki =

Fictional character in the manga series To Love Ru

- To Love Ru character
- Mikan as illustrated by Kentaro Yabuki
- First appearance: To Love Ru chapter 1: "The Girl Who Fell From the Sky" (舞い降りた少女, Maiorita Shōjo) (April 2006)
- Created by: Saki Hasemi; Kentaro Yabuki
- Voiced by: Kana Hanazawa (Japanese); Brittney Karbowski (English)

In-universe information
- Occupation: Student
- Relatives: Rito Yuuki (older brother); Saibai Yuuki (father); Ringo Yuuki (mother)
- Nationality: Japanese

Mikan Yuuki (Japanese: 結城 美柑, Hepburn: Yūki Mikan) is a fictional character in the manga series To Love Ru, created by Saki Hasemi and Kentaro Yabuki. In the series, Mikan is the independent and reliable younger sister of protagonist Rito Yuuki. She also appears in the sequel, To Love Ru Darkness. In the anime adaptations, she is voiced by Kana Hanazawa in Japanese and Brittney Karbowski in English.

== Conception and creation ==
Mikan Yuuki was one of the earliest characters writer Saki Hasemi and illustrator Kentaro Yabuki conceived for To Love Ru, done so upon realizing they did not have a "little sister" character. While thinking her up and creating her was rather easy, crafting her personality caused them a lot of "suffering". Hasemi said most of the confusion came over how she would refer to Rito; although "Oniichan" kept popping into the author's head, they ultimately decided on her addressing her older brother by his first name. Hasemi and Yabuki were always mindful to make Mikan cute, and give her an "impish but irresistible charm". Hasemi said that while she is quite steadfast, Mikan is still an elementary school student and wants to enjoy herself and mess with Rito, "That's kind of her vibe." Although she slowly starts to realize who Rito's dream girl is as the story progresses, she continues to have no problem teasing him over it. In volume three of the manga, Hasemi said that he had thought of and abandoned several story ideas for Mikan. This was because, no matter what he did, advancing the story from her perspective would leave Lala Satalin Deviluke and Haruna Sairenji behind and "narrow" the scope more than usual with not much character interaction. He also noted how he really wanted to create friends for Mikan. Hasemi later described Mikan as "the housewife character", and "pretty much Rito's de-facto wife".

When Uchida, Hasemi and Yabuki's editor, pointed out how Mikan was always drawn licking ice cream, Yabuki said that was because "We just thought that there wasn't many overly sexy and erotic little sister characters in rom-com manga". Uchida responded by saying "She's just as sexy as the others, isn't she?" In the manga's third year of serialization, the creators thought about having the main cast move up a grade, but one of the reasons they decided against it was because Mikan would have had to grow up. Yabuki explained it was about "her character attributes"; by having her appearance change and her clothes switch to a school uniform, it would seem like she was growing up and they felt that To Love Ru had not gotten to that stage of the story yet. Yabuki said that by the latter half of the series, they were treating all the female characters as main heroines, "even Mikan". At the end of To Love Ru, Yabuki said most of his favorite chapters involved Mikan. In the final volume of To Love Ru Darkness, released in early April 2017, Yabuki jokingly commented that he was plotting to draw a spin-off starring Mikan as a magical girl.

"Mikan" is the Japanese word for a seedless fruit that is said to have originated in either Japan or China. In the anime television series adaptations of To Love Ru and To Love Ru Darkness, Mikan is voiced by Kana Hanazawa in Japanese, and by Brittney Karbowski in the English dub provided by Sentai Filmworks.

== Appearances ==
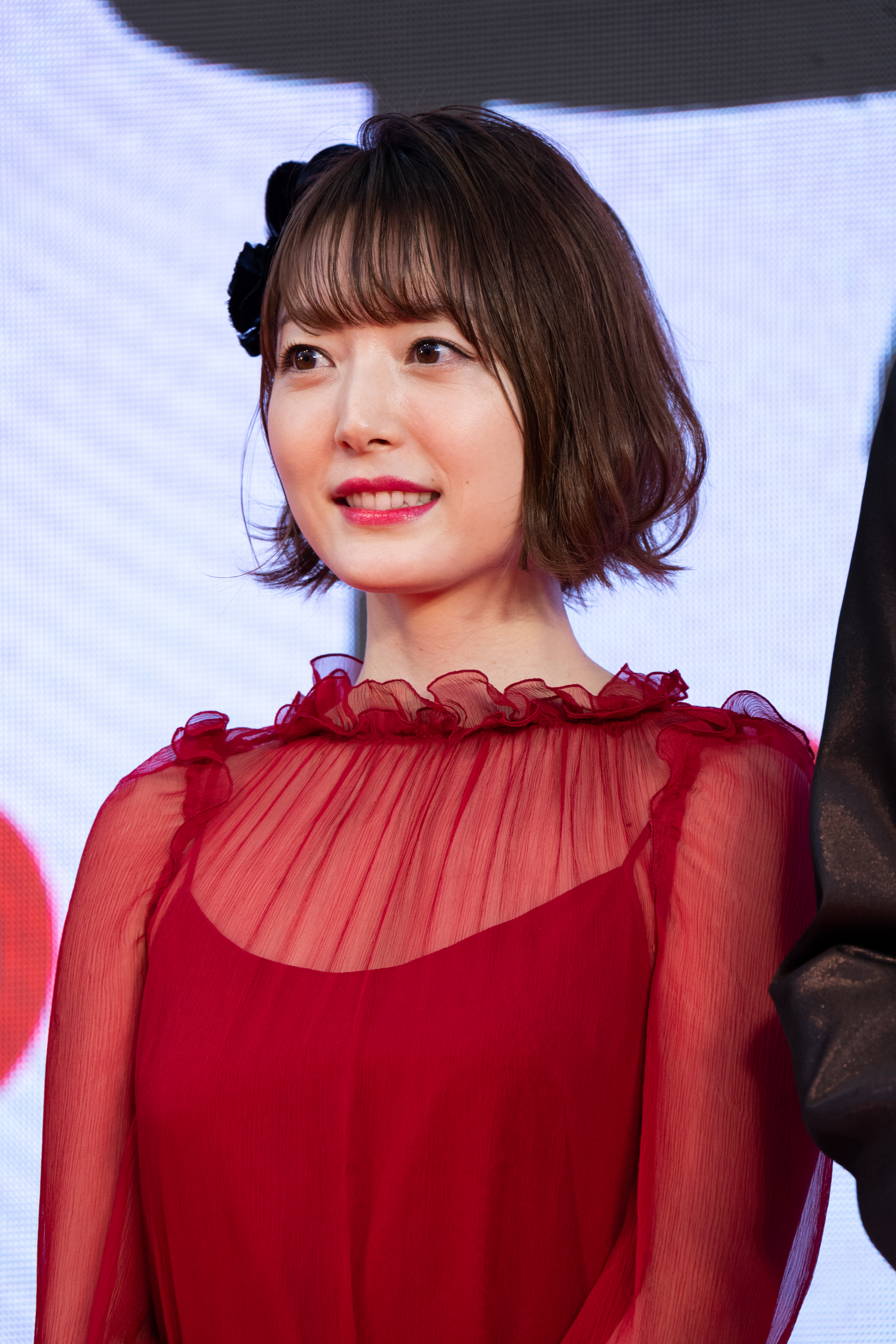
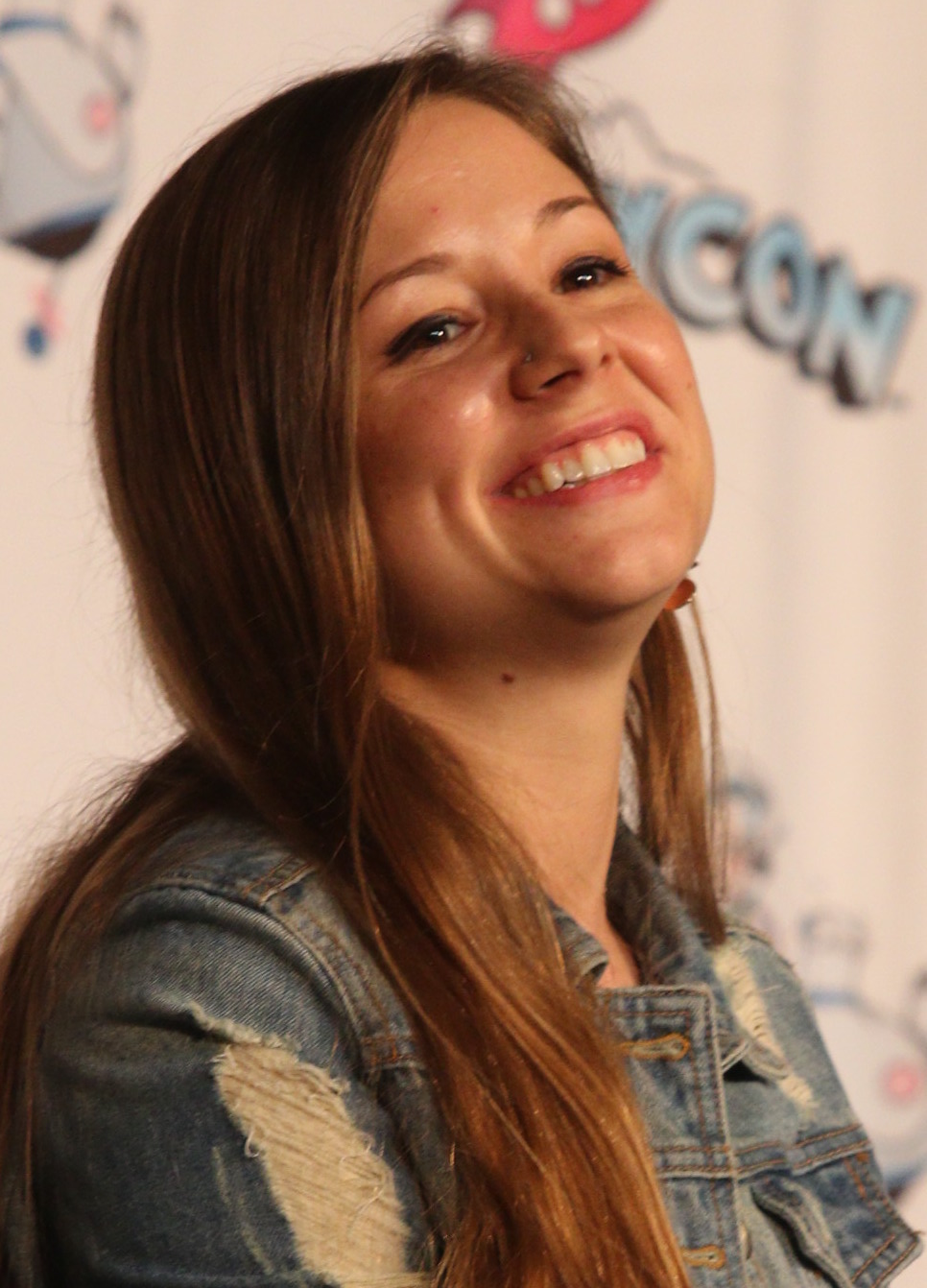
Kana Hanazawa (left) and Brittney Karbowski (right) provide the voice of Mikan in Japanese and English respectively.

In To Love Ru and To Love Ru Darkness, Mikan is depicted as the independent and reliable 12-year-old sister of protagonist Rito Yuuki. With their parents–Saibai and Ringo–often away on business, she takes care of the housework. In contrast to Rito, Mikan is very mature, but does not hesitate to tease him; calling him a "playboy" for attracting so many girls, including Lala Satalin Deviluke, Haruna Sairenji, Golden Darkness, Yui Kotegawa, and many others. Mikan is very perceptive to other people's feelings, such as immediately perceiving Rito's crush on Haruna after noticing his obvious anxiety around her. Mikan also seems to have a certain lack of respect for Rito, rarely addressing him by his honorific as an older brother. Although she may not show it often, she cares deeply for Rito and misses his company, to the point one could suspect her of having a brother complex. She also states how she and Rito used to play together before Lala entered their lives. Mikan, however, does respect Rito's relationship with Lala, even going so far as to tell Lala's younger sister, Momo Belia Deviluke, not to get too close to Rito for Lala's sake. Mikan grows quite attached to Golden Darkness, perhaps due to the two seemingly being the same age.

In addition to the anime and manga series, Mikan appears in the video game To Love Ru Darkness: True Princess (2015), as well as the smartphone game To Love Ru Darkness: Idol Revolution (2014).

== Reception ==
=== Critical response ===
In a review for the first season of the anime adaptation of To Love Ru, Theron Martin of Anime News Network (ANN) described Mikan as having the "I'm going to be a knock-out when I'm a few years older" kind of sex appeal. In the review for the anime's second season, Martin highlighted Mikan's friendship with Golden Darkness. Reviewing the third season of the anime, which is based on To Love Ru Darkness, Martin commented how Mikan has been demoted to a substantially "meatier role" in the series. Martin also noted that–with the exception of Mikan–virtually every female character is shown with exposed nipples at one or more points in the anime. In another review, Martin observed that Mikan has a lesser degree of development in the fourth season of the anime, while also praising the character, saying, "Mikan's strength continues to be in her disgusted expressions at the crazy behavior around her, along with her cumulative interactions with Golden Darkness."

=== Popularity and merchandise ===
Mikan is one of the most popular characters in To Love Ru, ranking 4th place with 2,472 votes in the series' first popularity poll, with the results being displayed on the cover of the manga's 57th chapter. In June 2014, Crunchyroll announced the results of a popularity poll conducted by Japanese website Charapedia to determine which anime characters fans would like to have as a little sister; Mikan was ranked 9th with 114 votes. In September 2014, Crunchyroll disclosed the results of another popularity poll made by Charapedia about the female characters whose homemade food fans would most like to eat, and Mikan ranked 6th with 237 votes.

The October 2015 issue of Shueisha's Jump Square magazine included the results of several popularity polls for the heroines of To Love-Ru Darkness. In the various categories presented, Mikan ranked: 1st as "which character would you want to be in your family?"; 7th as "which character would you want to be your girlfriend (or wife)?"; and 8th as "which character would be your favorite if all the heroines were in an idol group?". In the same year, when ANN polled its visitors on the same questions, Mikan ranked: 1st as "which character would you want to be in your family (but not as a wife/girlfriend)?"; 5th as "which character would you want to be your girlfriend (or wife)?"; 6th as "which character would be your favorite if all the heroines were in an idol group?"; and 8th as "which character would you want to be your friend?" and "which character would you want to switch bodies with for just one day?". The December 2016 issue of Jump Square revealed the top 10 female characters from To Love Ru Darkness whose nipples were exposed the most in the manga, and Mikan was ranked 7th with a total of 94 times.

Mikan's popularity led to her being featured in various promotional materials and other merchandise for the series. In April 2013, the online store for the Animate retailer started pre-ordering a box of eight different To Love Ru-themed cell phone straps with the image of a female character from the manga–including Mikan. The straps were sent in May of the same year. In October 2017, Japanese company FOTS JAPAN began pre-orders for the sale of their first item, a pre-painted 1/8 scale PMMA figure of Mikan wearing a one-piece swimsuit. The 200mm tall figure was based on an illustration of the character drawn by Yabuki, which was included in an art book of his released in October 2012. The figure was priced at 12,960 yen (about 115 US dollars) and was scheduled to ship in late November 2017. A scale figure of Mikan wearing a werewolf costume was pre-ordered for sale in October 2019 and released in March 2020. Another scale figure of Mikan wearing a bunny girl costume was pre-ordered for sale in July 2020 and released in January 2021.

== See also ==
- List of To Love Ru characters
