= Golden Darkness =

Fictional character in the manga series To Love Ru

- To Love Ru character
- Golden Darkness as illustrated by Kentaro Yabuki
- First appearance: To Love Ru chapter 35: "Golden Darkness" (金色の闇, "Konjiki no yami")
- Created by: Saki Hasemi; Kentaro Yabuki
- Voiced by: Misato Fukuen (Japanese); Katelyn Barr (English)

In-universe information
- Occupation: Assassin (formerly); Student (currently)
- Relatives: Tearju Lunatique (creator; genetic mother); Mea Kurosaki (genetic younger sister)

Golden Darkness (Japanese: 金色の闇, Hepburn: Konjiki no Yami), commonly nicknamed "Yami" (ヤミ), is a fictional character in the manga series To Love Ru, created by Saki Hasemi and Kentaro Yabuki. In the series, Golden Darkness is portrayed as the deadliest assassin in the galaxy who is hired to kill protagonist Rito Yuuki, but instead ends up developing feelings for and falling in love with him.

Although initially featured as a recurring secondary character in the original To Love Ru series, Golden Darkness becomes one of the main female protagonists in the sequel, To Love Ru Darkness, with most of its central plot revolving around the character.

== Creation and conception ==
Having wanted a girl assassin constantly pursuing protagonist Rito Yuuki since the beginning of To Love Ru, its illustrator Kentaro Yabuki finally initiated the addition of Golden Darkness once the characters and world had stabilized. The result of his discussions with series writer Saki Hasemi and their supervisor was to use a "refined version" of Eve from Yabuki's previous series Black Cat (2000–2004). This was because of three reasons; it would be a nice surprise to readers of Yabuki's previous work, he had always wanted to have a character cross over between works, and he could utilize Eve's ability to turn her body into a weapon. When Hasemi initially planned to give Golden Darkness a childish way of speaking like Eve, Yabuki asked him to change it and personally added lines that negate the concept of To Love Ru, like "I despise perversion." (えっちぃのは嫌いです。, Etchī no wa Kirai Desu.) Golden Darkness and Eve are both voiced by the same actress in the anime adaptations of their respective manga series, Misato Fukuen. In one chapter of To Love Ru, Golden Darkness tries on a black dress similar to the one that Eve wears in the final chapters of Black Cat.

Hasemi had wanted Golden Darkness to have a twin sister, one being dark and one nice, but it was put aside and the characters Nana Astar Deviluke and Momo Belia Deviluke eventually inherited the concept. Because of the character's Eve connection, Yabuki revealed that he and Hasemi were "more restrained" with the sexual situations in Golden Darkness's debut volume, but said that he can not give her special treatment the next time she appears. At the end of To Love Ru, Uchida, Hasemi and Yabuki's editor, suggested Golden Darkness was one of the characters who had changed the most in the series, with Yabuki agreeing stating that she "mellowed out". However, Hasemi said that he believed her character development was on par with how they had initially estimated. In the final volume of To Love Ru Darkness, Yabuki stated that one of the reasons for ending the sequel series was because they had finished telling everything there is to say about "the Darkness arc of Momo and Yami as we originally planned it".

== Appearances ==
=== In To Love Ru ===
Golden Darkness is introduced in the eponymous 35th chapter of the To Love Ru series, as a dispassionate, withdrawn galactic assassin hired by Lacospo to kill Rito Yuuki. Although she can accomplish this easily, after seeing Rito's true nature, she stays on Earth and claims to be continuing her contract to assassinate him. But is really ignoring it because she wants to stay on Earth. She is usually found roaming the streets of Sainan, spending most of her time reading books and eating taiyaki; the first food offered to her by Rito. On Earth, Golden Darkness lives in her spaceship, the Lunatique (ルナティーク, Runatīku), which is capable of traveling 300,000 light-years in about 2 hours. Over time, Golden Darkness becomes close to Rito's younger sister, Mikan Yuuki, perhaps due to the two seemingly being the same age, and seems to keep an eye out for her. In the anime adaptation, despite having the appearance of a 14-year-old girl, Golden Darkness is actually 24 by her planet's calculations because her ability has slowed her aging process. Golden Darkness has the ability to transform any part of her body into weapons, with her only weakness appearing to be slimy things. She often states that she "despises perversion", and does not hesitate to assault a person who looks at her in an obscene way.

=== In To Love Ru Darkness ===
Though she maintains she will kill Rito one day, it becomes increasingly doubtful that she will ever do it and actually seems to develop feelings for him instead. In the sequel to To Love Ru, entitled To Love Ru Darkness, after some convincing from Mikan, Golden Darkness enrolls in the Sainan High and becomes a classmate of the main cast. Despite her normal stoic appearance, it is obvious that she does care for Rito, and is shown to be developing further feelings for him, although not enough to forgo the occasional beating when he becomes perverted. Her new life is put in jeopardy when Mea Kurosaki, a classmate, is revealed to be her 'little sister' and plans to have Golden Darkness fulfill her contract to kill Rito and return to space as an assassin. It is revealed that Golden Darkness's creator is the new Sainan High teacher Tearju Lunatique, and that her given name is "Eve" (イヴ, Ivu). Although Mea gives up on returning her to a heartless assassin, Nemesis eventually unleashes Golden Darkness's hidden true power, "Darkness" — a prototype transformation that sees her grow horns, allows her to open wormholes, and destroy entire planets. But due to Golden Darkness' feelings for Rito, instead of giving her an insatiable thirst for destruction, the "Darkness" program has a bug and gives her an overwhelming love of perversion, desiring to kill Rito in order to be one with him. Rito is able to bring Golden Darkness to her senses by acting against the program's expectations and doing perverted acts to her on purpose. When her former rival Azenda hires the alien hitman Kuro to kill Rito, Golden Darkness is revealed to now be able to control the "Darkness" form, and rescues Rito before confessing her love to him.

=== In other media ===
In the anime television series adaptations of To Love Ru, the Japanese voice actress for Golden Darkness is Misato Fukuen, with Katelyn Barr voicing the character in the English dub. In addition to the anime and manga series, Golden Darkness appears in the video games To Love Ru Darkness: Battle Ecstasy (2014) and To Love Ru Darkness: True Princess (2015), as well as the smartphone games To Love Ru Darkness: Idol Revolution (2014) and To Love Ru Darkness: Gravure Chance (2017). Golden Darkness also makes a cameo appearance in the seventh chapter of the manga adaptation of the light novel series Mayoi Neko Overrun! (2008–2012).

== Reception ==
=== Critical response ===
In a review for To Love Ru, Theron Martin of Anime News Network commented that Golden Darkness provides To Love Ru with the "loli look" that some fans prefer, with Martin highlighting the character's hair buckles. Reviewing To Love Ru Darkness, Martin noted how Golden Darkness has been demoted to a substantially "meatier role" in the series, but praised the way Golden Darkness received "more opportunity for character development, which feeds into a greater number of action scenes, and also allows for a protracted exploration of Golden Darkness' background, something that has been conspicuously absent in the animated content up to this point". In another review for To Love Ru Darkness, Martin stated, "Golden Darkness gets a lot of attention, because the crux of the plot centers on her latent 'darkness' aspect, which has been vaguely hinted at before but comes into with an unexpected twist in the last few episodes".

=== Popularity and merchandise ===
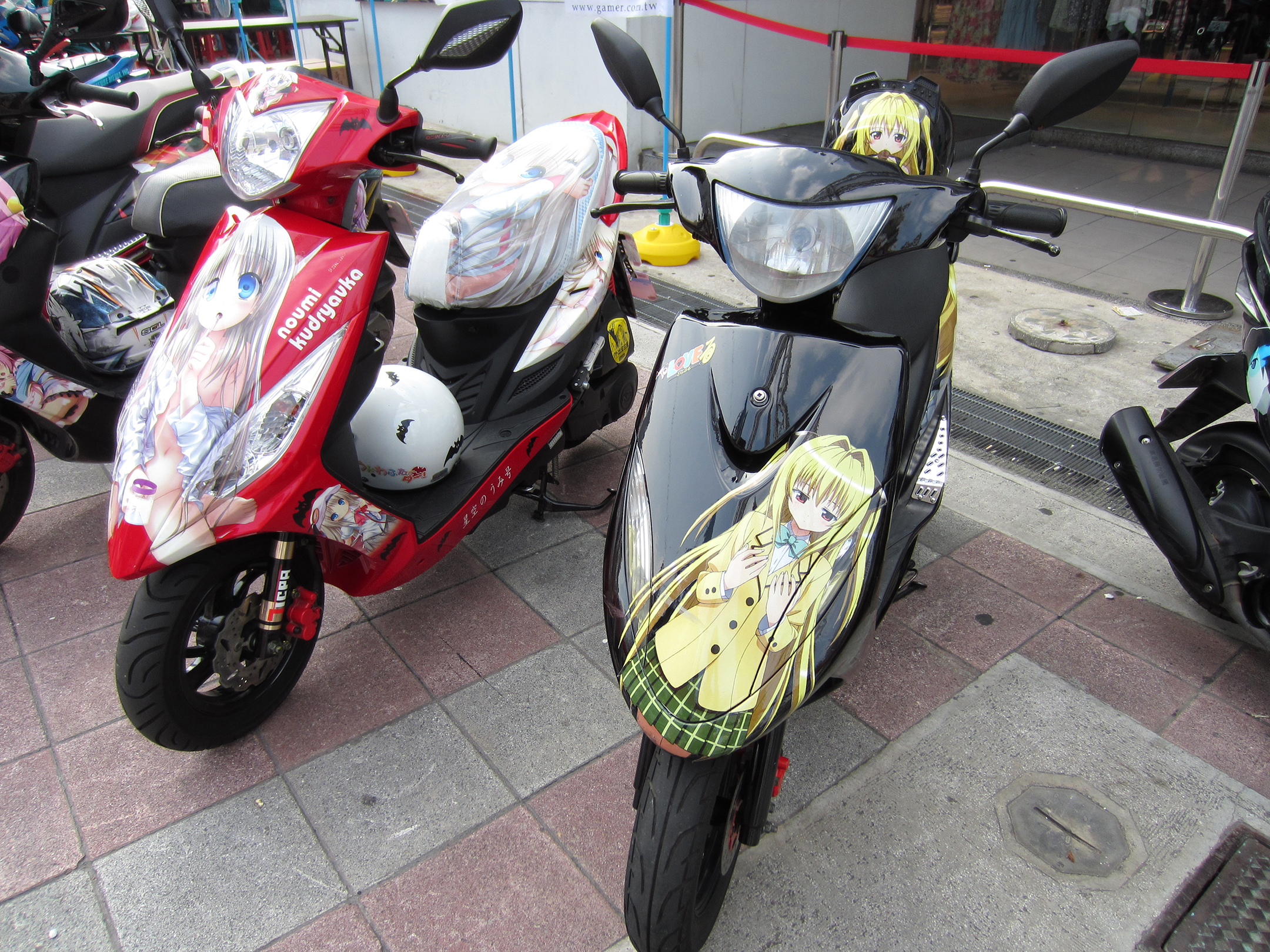
An itansha featuring Golden Darkness (right)

Golden Darkness is one of the most popular characters in the series, coming in third place in the manga's first character popularity poll. The October 2015 issue of Shueisha's Jump Square magazine included the results of several popularity polls for the heroines of To Love-Ru Darkness. In the various categories presented, Golden Darkness ranked: 1st as "which character would you want to switch bodies with for just one day?"; and 3rd as "which character would you want to be your girlfriend (or wife)?", "which character would you want to be in your family?" and "which character would be your favorite if all the heroines were in an idol group?". When English-language website Anime News Network polled its visitors on the same questions, Golden Darkness ranked: 1st as "which character would you want to be your friend?" and "which character would you want to switch bodies with for just one day?"; 2nd as "which character would you want to be in your family (but not as a wife/girlfriend)?"; and 4th as "which character would you want to be your girlfriend (or wife)?" and "which character would be your favorite if all the heroines were in an idol group?". In December 2016, Jump Square revealed the top 10 female characters from To Love Ru Darkness whose nipples were exposed the most in the manga; Golden Darkness came in 4th place with a total of 128 times.

Golden Darkness' popularity led to her being featured in various promotional materials and other merchandise for the series, such as 300 official mousepads, each with a 3D image of the character's buttocks, which were distributed in April 2012. In late January 2016, Shueisha's Shōnen Jump+ online magazine celebrated its one-year anniversary by giving away manga-themed items signed by their respective authors; one such item was a box of tissues containing an image of Golden Darkness saying her iconic catchphrase, "I despise perversion", and as the tissues were removed, they revealed a nude drawing of the character made by Yabuki.

== See also ==
- List of To Love Ru characters
