= List of Black Cat characters =

The main characters of Black Cat. From left to right: Sven Vollfied (back), Train Heartnet, Rinslet Walker (back), Eve.

The Black Cat manga series features characters created by Kentaro Yabuki. The story follows a young man named Train Heartnet who withdrew from an elite group of assassins called the Chronos Numbers two years earlier and is now a Sweeper, or bounty hunter. Many of the characters are humans with superhuman strength, speed and/or supernatural abilities. Black Cat's anime adaptation features some characters not created by Yabuki, as well as many plot differences.

== Main characters ==
=== Train Heartnet ===
Voiced by: Takashi Kondō, Minami Takayama (child) (Japanese); Jason Liebrecht, Luci Christian (child) (English)

Train Heartnet (トレイン＝ハートネット, Torein Hātonetto), also known as Black Cat (黒猫, Kuro Neko), is the protagonist and a Sweeper partnered with Sven. Train is a light-hearted, courageous man who is highly skilled with a gun. The 23-year-old's distinguishing features are a choker with a tiny bell attached to it and the XIII tattoo he has on the left side of his chest. Two years earlier Train was a Chronos Number, a ruthless assassin and Number XIII of the group. He has a large amount of killing intent that he honed from his days as a Chronos member, and as a result he often has sudden mood swings, going from carefree to serious in an instant, especially when Creed is mentioned. This personality stems from being orphaned at 10 years old after the assassin Zagine Axeloake kills his parents, takes Train in and teaches him how to kill with efficiency.^{[ch. 68]} Zagine eventually dies and tells Train that he needs to be the strongest in order to survive. After that, Karl took Train in and he became an assassin for Chronos. Having been killing and exposed to death since early childhood, Train becomes very bleak and unsmiling until he leaves Chronos. He eventually meets Saya, a carefree sweeper, who slowly changes Train into a "stray cat" that does not blindly follow orders. He decides not to kill anymore, and after Creed kills Saya, he leaves to become a Sweeper and searches after him.

He wields Hades (ハーディス, Hādisu), a black and gold revolver made out of Orichalcum weighing 2.5 kg, with the numeral XIII engraved into its side and a red tassel attached to its hand grip that stretches out like a leash. He possesses 20/20 vision and is an extremely skilled marksman, able to accurately shoot down bullets from other guns,^{[ch. 36]} and hit the same place with a number of bullets at exactly the same time. He is ambidextrous, but naturally left-handed; using his left hand increases his speed and accuracy.^{[ch. 16]} He can also shoot a number of bullets while in the air to accelerate him into a spinning slash, "Black Claw", that leaves four large slash marks. He also uses specialty bullets created by Sven, including the Burst Bullet, which produces an extremely large amount of damage, and bullets that freeze or paralyze opponents. His gun is made out of the strongest metal called Orichalcum, which allows him to use the gun to deflect bullets and guard against other attacks. When his body becomes infected with nanomachines he manages to manipulate them into creating static electricity, allowing him to focus the electricity into the barrel of Hades, turning it into a railgun.^{[ch. 111]} However, he loses this ability after one last maximum shot in the final fight with Creed.^{[ch. 185]}

Yabuki chose the name Train because it brings about the image of him freighthopping. In the original one-shot version, Stray Cat, Train was a famous Sweeper that gave that life up to become a Delivery Man. Additionally, he could use Tao to turn his chi into bullets fired from his pistol with a taijitu symbol on it, or into a blade coming from its barrel.^{[ch. Stray Cat]} Train came in first place in all three of the series' character popularity contests.

=== Sven Vollfied ===
Voiced by: Keiji Fujiwara (Japanese); Brandon Potter (English)

Sven Vollfied (スヴェン＝ボルフィード, Suven Borufīdo) is a sweeper and Train's partner. The 30-year-old follows a strict code of chivalry: he is always respectful to women and children and acts very proper. He befriends Eve, being the first person to treat her like a human, which causes the two to become very close like a father and daughter relationship. He is often tortured by Train's capricious personality and is usually dragged into trouble and even more debt because of it. Sven is skilled in inventing and making innovative weapons and other various equipment, including bombs and special bullets for Train. Sven's weapon of choice was originally a normal pistol, but after that is destroyed, he invents the Attaché Weapon Case (アタッシュウェポンケース, Atasshu Wepon Kēsu), a suitcase equipped with hidden weaponry inside of it. It contains a built-in machine gun,^{[ch. 37]} grenade launcher, net launcher,^{[ch. 55]} an electrical cable, and various other small weapons inside the case.

Before becoming a sweeper, he was an inspector for the International Bureau of Investigations (国際捜査局, Kokusai Sōsa Kyoku), along with his partner, Lloyd Goldwynne. Lloyd possessed an ability called the "Vision Eye" (予見眼(ヴィジョンアイ), Vijon Ai), which allowed him to see a few seconds into the future.^{[ch. 29]} Seven years ago, after being attacked by members of a crime family, Sven loses his right eye and Lloyd sacrifices himself to save him.^{[ch. 30]} A week before his death, Lloyd registered as an organ donor; Sven received one of his eyes and the Vision Eye, although he is not able to use it as well as Lloyd. However, it puts a massive strain on his body so he normally keeps it under an eye patch. Sven later evolves it into the "Grasper Eye" (支配眼(グラスパーアイ), Gurasupā Ai) through rigorous training by having cannonballs fired at him, honing his endurance with the eye to the point where extensive use no longer drains him to the point of total collapse.^{[ch. 121]} The Grasper Eye allows him to see things in slow motion for about five seconds, allowing him to evade seemingly impossible attacks and barrages, and is less draining than the Vision Eye.^{[ch. 142]}

The name Sven was taken from a minor character in a blockbuster film Yabuki enjoyed. In the original one-shot version, Stray Cat, Sven is a Delivery Man instead of a Sweeper and had a beard.^{[ch. Stray Cat]} Sven came in seventh, fourth and third place in the series' three character popularity contests.

=== Eve ===
Voiced by: Misato Fukuen (Japanese); Brina Palencia (English)

Eve (イヴ, Ivu) is a young beautiful girl, who is a genetically cloned and engineered bio-weapon. After being rescued by Train and Sven, she accompanies them on their travels. She is able to use nanotechnology to transform her body into various offensive and defensive weapons and heal any injuries. Initially only able to alter limited parts of her body, she is later able to transform her entire body at will, though it causes a lot of strain on her. She typically turns her arms into blades, hammers and shields,^{[ch. 35]} turns her hair into fists and microblades able to cut through steel,^{[ch. 63, 101]} turns her own skin into steel, and sprouts wings from her back to fly. The nanomachines in her body also alter her clothing; for changing her appendages or growing wings without ripping them. Eve's DNA was taken from the chief scientist responsible for the nanotechnology experiments, Tearju Lunatique, thus the two look identical.^{[ch. 108]}

She is designed to be the ultimate soldier, being raised to be an emotionless killing machine, not understanding the concept of free choice. She is saved by Sven from the weapons smuggler, Torneo Rudman, and he treats her like a human for the first time in her life. Seemingly unfeeling and more like the machine she was made to be initially, she turned more and more like a human as the series progress due to the time she spent with Train and Sven. She loves reading, and can remember everything in a book after reading it once, which also served to build her humanity. Sven initially tries to keep her away from the Sweeper life for her own safety, though she proves that she can fight and he begins to treat her as a partner. She also has a deep sense of compassion and will absolutely not kill no matter what, stemming from guilt she feels for the murders she committed before Sven found her.

Yabuki agonized over choosing her name, looking for one that evoked "purity and innocence." Eve came in second place in all three of the series' character popularity contests. The character Golden Darkness (or Yami) from Yabuki's later work, To Love Ru, is based on Eve. They both have the ability to turn parts of their bodies into weapons. Golden Darkness comes from the spaceship Lunatique and her creator is Tearju. In chapter 61 of To Love-Ru, Golden Darkness tries on a black dress similar to the one that Eve wears in the final chapters of Black Cat. In chapter 15 of To Love-Ru Darkness, it is revealed that the character's true name is Eve.

=== Rinslet Walker ===
Voiced by: Yukana (Japanese); Jamie Marchi (English)

Rinslet Walker (リンスレット＝ウォーカー, Rinsuretto Uōkā) is an infamous thief-for-hire that recruits Train and Sven for a heist, but continues teaming with them afterwards. The 21-year-old works for everyone from mob bosses to the government, this being the reason a bounty is never placed on her.^{[ch. 2]} Rinslet claims she can steal anything and manipulate any man,^{[ch. 2]} though she has trouble with Train; she can sucker him into participating in her schemes, but can't get him to follow her plans to the letter. She occasionally provides Train and Sven with targets, so that they can act as distractions while she steals. She treats Eve as a younger sister, much to her own annoyance. Rinslet owns and uses a gun but she is not as skilled at fighting as Train or Sven, she also carries a whip with a heart-shaped tip.^{[ch. 35]} Rinslet is not cold-hearted and will help others or even destroy what she is hired to steal if the item is dangerous to humanity. She is later forcefully hired by Chronos to act as bait.

Yabuki chose the name Rinslet because it evokes the image of a "silky haired beauty."

== Supporting characters ==
=== Saya Minatsuki ===
Voiced by: Megumi Toyoguchi (Japanese); Caitlin Glass (English)

Saya Minatsuki (ミナツキ＝サヤ, Minatsuki Saya) was an accomplished sweeper and close friend of Train. Her involvement with him led to his more human outlook on life and his departure from Chronos. Train denies having had romantic feelings for the 19-year-old, stating he "fell in love... with her way of living. Not bound by anyone or anything... like a stray cat."^{[ch. 31, 61]}

Saya has no memories of her life before the age of ten, due to heavy abuse from her parents. Her first real memory is waking up in hospital and being carried off to a relative's house.^{[ch. 184]} She constantly wears a yukata because she likes their appearance and thinks it makes her stand out. She develops the "Reflect Shot" (リフレクショット, Rifureku Shotto) over the course of five years, allowing her to fire bullets that ricochet off hard surfaces and strike opponents at odd angles and different velocities.^{[ch. 117]}

Creed, seeing that Train's personality is changing due to her, confronts Saya and the two fight until she is stabbed while being distracted by kids.^{[ch. 117]} She does manage to destroy his sword before dying.^{[ch. 118]} Devastated by her death, Train struggles while whether or not to get revenge on Creed, until settling on taking him in as a Sweeper instead of killing him. Saya's spirit later helps Train defeat the Doctor's Warp World and aim his final shot at Creed.^{[ch. 163, 183]}

Saya's name just popped into Yabuki's head while he was looking at her face.

=== Tearju Lunatique ===
Voiced by: Misato Fukuen (Japanese); Brina Palencia (English)

Tearju Lunatique (ティアーユ＝ルナティーク, Tiāyu Runatīku) is one of the top authorities in nanotechnology and leader of the group that created Eve.^{[ch. 92]} Eve's DNA was taken from hers, thus making them look identical.^{[ch. 108]} She is very bad at household chores and has the ability to trip over nothing. Train, Sven and Eve seek her out after Train is shot with the Lucifer bullet and turned into a child, in hopes she knows how to revert it. Because of the huge cost of a vaccine, she informs him the only other possibility is to mentally concentrate and visualize changing his body, similar to how Eve does it.^{[ch. 107]} The Apostles seek her out at the same time so Creed can obtain immortality, but she refuses, having resolved to never experiment with humans again.^{[ch. 113]}

In the anime, Tearju is absent from this part joining much later after the assault on the Apostles, because she had brain damage from an explosion at the time of Eve's creation. She is hospitalized and is shown to react violently to her reflection in the mirror. This is later explained by Tearju as being the result of her having hypnotized herself to react violently toward Eve. She travels with Sven and the others and shares information about Eve and Eden so that they may destroy Eden and save Eve. The Doctor is actually her former partner.

=== Woodney ===
Voiced by: Bon Ishihara (Japanese); Jeremy Inman (English)

Woodney (ウドニー, Udonī) is an overweight sweeper who imitates Train by dressing in a long black coat, referring to himself as the "Black Cat" and having the number thirteen tattooed on his left arm (albeit it is in Arabic numerals, not Roman, drawn with a marker, and occasionally alternating arms).^{[ch. 44, 45]} He meets with moderate success as a sweeper by using the Black Cat's reputation to intimidate his enemies, but this tactic backfires when he is faced with a powerful criminal.^{[ch. 46]} After an encounter with the real Train, he gives up imitating him and attempts to become his disciple,^{[ch. 46]} but Train convinces him he would help more by being an informer to them.^{[ch. 47]} In the anime, the only main difference in Woodney is that he keeps on following the group, instead of turning into an information broker, and is the cause of some humorous moments.

=== Tim Vertical ===
Voiced by: Motoko Kumai (Japanese); Colleen Clinkenbeard (English)

Tim Vertical (ティム＝バーティカル, Timu Bātikaru) is an orphan whose journalist father was killed by police detective Bouldin for having evidence that the police are making deals with the mafia.^{[ch. 64]} Before he died he gave Tim the film roll of evidence, causing Bouldin and the mafia to seek the boy out, dead or alive. After being saved by him, Tim asks Train to kill Bouldin so he can have revenge, and Train agrees having been reminded of his own parents' deaths.^{[ch. 64]} However, Train shoots Bouldin with a fake bullet to teach Tim a lesson.^{[ch. 67]} Having sent the evidence to the press, Train, Sven and Eve drop Tim off to live with his grandmother. Tim vows to become a journalist like his father and write a story on Train and Sven.^{[ch. 67]} His last name is only given in the anime.

In the anime, Tim is one of the orphans that Train helps to fight. He is also the new leader of the group of orphans, replacing Leon who is revealed to be their former leader. In his past life, Tim's father was killed the same as in the manga. After the incident, Bouldin and the mafia have been trying to kill Tim and the orphans, and Tim was trying to do the same himself. Following the death of his father Tim, along with Leon and the other orphans, formed a makeshift family to take care of each other. Train and Eve first run into the orphans who are being attacked by a group of men. They find out that the group wants the kids to leave so Train and Eve decided to help them out. When the same men come back for revenge Train defeats them and they leave for good. When the Apostles of the Stars are defeated, Leon goes back to the orphans, but when Eden attacked, it captured Tim. After Eden is defeated Tim is brought back home and reunites with the orphans. At the end of the series Leon, Tim, Layla, and all the kids are working at a restaurant and Leon and Tim talk about what they have been through to get there.

=== Layla ===
Voiced by: Miyuu Sawai (Japanese); Kate Oxley (English)

Layla (レイラ, Reira), an anime-only character, is another orphan who lives with Tim and the other children in an abandoned factory. She used to be by herself until she met Tim, and Leon, who then became her new family. After Train refused to help them, Layla explained to Eve their situation. The two girls bonded, and became good friends. Before departing, Layla had her new friend promise her to tell Leon something should Eve meet him. Layla is next seen with her family in the first city approached by Eden. They all manage to not get sucked into the machine except for Tim. Layla, Leon, and the rest of the kids team up with the Sweepers to rescue Eve, and stop Eden. After stopping Eden, the kids open their own bakery, which, according to Leon, was Layla's dream.

== Chronos ==
Chronos (秘密結社(クロノス), Kuronosu) is an organization that controls one third of the world's economy,^{[ch. 2]} and much of the plot revolves around them and their connection to Train, a former member. They have a special group of strong individuals, the Chronos Numbers (時の番人(クロノ・ナンバーズ), Kurono Nanbāzu), that act as "Erasers" (抹殺者(イレイザー), Ireizā), or assassins and only follow orders from the Council of Elders that run the organization.^{[ch. 20]} Each Number have complete mastery of a weapon made of Orichalcum, the strongest metal in the world.^{[ch. 26]}

=== Sephiria Arks ===
Voiced by: Kikuko Inoue (Japanese); Lydia Mackay (English)

Sephiria Arks (セフィリア＝アークス, Sefiria Ākusu), known as Number I, is the commander of the Numbers and is trusted enough by Chronos to be given total control over killing Creed. Sephiria was one of the few members who were "born for Chronos", as she stated that when she was an infant she underwent surgery to enhance her recovery time from injuries.^{[ch. 184]} Sven once commented that her eyes allowed her to stare into the recesses of one's soul.^{[ch. 47]} This empathy is her greatest strength, which allows her to utilize her powers of manipulation to their utmost extent. She will do anything to finish her missions and will sacrifice whatever it takes in order to succeed in meeting an objective. However, she does show some inner conflict in her manipulation, even questioning Belze about her actions.^{[ch. 47]} She controls all of the Chronos Numbers' actions as well as many of the independent operatives in the hunt for Creed with little interference from the Elders.

Despite her gentle looks and young age, her swordsmanship is undisputed. She has such precision and swiftness with her weapon, Christ (クライスト, Kuraisuto; "Ichthus" in the English translation), a saber of unparalleled sharpness, that her strokes produce no sound and her movements leave after-images in her wake. She knows all thirty-six moves of her style, the ultimate being "Mekkai World Destroyer", which completely reduces a target to nothing.^{[ch. 170]} However, her muscles sustain severe damage in using this technique. Although she loses, she survives her battle with Creed due to Train's timely arrival and her enhanced healing.^{[ch. 173, 184]}

Her personality is drastically changed in the anime. Here, she is much less charismatic, showing little outward emotion, and is generally much more ruthless and aggressive. She is also much less manipulative, preferring to handle things personally and with straightforward planning rather than manipulate others into doing work for Chronos. She initially holds much animosity towards Train for his decision to leave Chronos and tries to kill him on several occasions. At the end of the anime, she and the other four Numbers left take control of Chronos.

=== Belze Rochefort ===
Voiced by: Hideyuki Hori (Japanese); Mike McFarland (English)

Belze Rochefort (ベルゼー＝ロシュフォール, Beruzē Roshufōru), known as Number II, is the vice commander of the Numbers, and one of the closest people to Sephiria. He understands that Chronos is a dark and evil organization but also knows that if Chronos is destroyed, the world will fall into chaos. His weapon is an Orichalcum spear named Gungnir (グングニル, Gunguniru). Belze is a cultured man and an accomplished martial artist. Creed himself says that even two of his apostles working together have little chance of defeating Belze. Belze holds no ill-will towards Train but hates Creed. He truly respects Sephiria as his superior even though he's several years older than her. After fighting to a draw with Charden Flamberg and Kyoko Kirisaki, Belze is the first to realize just how dangerous the Apostles of the Stars are. He usually takes a back seat to Sephiria and complies with her decisions even though he will express his opinion if he sees a flaw in her plans.

=== Emilio Lowe ===
Voiced by: Susumu Chiba (Japanese); Orion Pitts (English)

Emilio Lowe (エミリオ＝ロウ, Emirio Rou), known as Number III, is a member of Chronos. While he is briefly referred to,^{[ch. 184]} he never actually appears in the original manga. In the anime, he is a member of the Zero Numbers who defect from Chronos. He uses an Orichalcum bow and arrows as a weapon named Artemis (アルテミス, Arutemisu), and is able to fire them at an extremely fast rate. While on Eden, he is able to constantly revive due to nanomachines and Tao, though it kills him once the connection is severed. He takes part in the attack on the Apostles of the Stars.

=== Kranz Maduke ===
Voiced by: Atsushi Kakehashi (Japanese); Viktor Walker (English)

Kranz Maduke (クランツ＝マドゥーク, Kurantsu Madūku), known as Number IV, is a blind man raised to be an assassin from birth. Along with his partner, Baldor, he is extremely violent, going as far as destroying entire towns while completing their missions, and absolutely loyal to Chronos. He wears a helmet that conceals his eyes, having lost his sight in a battle several years ago, and has learned to fight through sensing sound and movement as he believes he was born to fight. His number is located on one of the eyes of the helmet. He and Baldor are tasked with killing the Apostles before Chronos' next strike on Creed, and also participates in the attack on Creed's headquarters using the Sweepers Alliance as a decoy. Kranz enjoys being silent and rarely talks, thus leaving Baldor to make the decisions. His weapon is an Orichalcum knife named Mars (マルス, Marusu), which is able to vibrate at a high frequency, allowing it to easily cut steel. He appears in the anime as one of the Zero Numbers, who defect from Chronos.

=== Nizer Bruckheimer ===
Voiced by: Hisao Egawa (Japanese); Daniel Penz (English)

Nizer Bruckheimer (ナイザー＝ブラッカイマー, Naizā Burakkaimā), known as Number V, is the leader of the elite commando squad Cerberus, and in charge of the close-range attacks. He wields a pair of Orichalcum tonfas named Dioskouroi (ディオスクロイ, Diosukuroi), which he wields with incredible skill.^{[ch. 72]} He is a bald man with a well cut black beard and commonly escorts Sephiria Arks when she leaves for business. Nizer is one of the first to act in Sephiria's defense when she isn't treated with respect. He holds a personal vendetta against Creed Diskenth for the death of Number X, his old partner Ash, and orders the others to allow him to be the one to kill Creed. Even though he holds a grudge against Creed, Nizer doesn't hunt him down for revenge but to complete his mission as a Number.^{[ch. 83]} After the destruction of the castle and Beluga's death, Nizer succumbs to a near-fatal wound and enters a coma.^{[ch. 87]} He recovers but is too injured to partake in the final attack on the Apostles.

=== Anubis ===
Voiced by: Andrew Tipps

Anubis (アヌビス, Anubisu), known as Number VI, is an anime-only character. He is a large black wolf, capable of human speech, with a long, mechanical tail made of Orichalcum. As well as using his Orichalcum tail, the weapon Osiris (オシリス, Oshirisu), he has his natural arsenals of claws and teeth. Anubis is first seen defending Numbers I and II after they are betrayed by the newly emerged Zero Numbers.

=== Jenos Hazard ===
Voiced by: Takahiro Sakurai (Japanese); Troy Baker (English)

Jenos Hazard (ジェノス＝ハザード, Jenosu Hazādo), known as Number VII, is the mid-range attacker of Cerberus. A womanizer, that gets violent whenever he sees a woman injured, his attempts at flirting usually fail due to overzealousness.^{[ch. 59]} Jenos is usually laid-back and energetic and doesn't appear to be serious most of the time, making it difficult for some to believe he's a Chronos assassin. He becomes infatuated with Rinslet, who uses physical violence to avert his flirts, though in the end she begins to warm up to him. In exchange for Rinslet's help in tracking Creed, Jenos becomes her bodyguard. Jenos' weapon is Excelion (エクセリオン, Ekuserion), a glove with indestructible Orichalcum wires attached to its tips, which he uses to tightly grasp or lacerate his opponents or their guns.^{[ch. 59]} He can also control the sharpness of the wires so they can either cut through stone or catch someone safely.^{[ch. 79]} Jenos cares about the survival of his teammates just as much as he does completing the mission.

=== Baldorias S. Fanghini ===
Voiced by: Anri Katsu (Japanese); Justin Cook (English)

Baldorias S. Fanghini (バルドリアス＝S＝ファンギーニ, Barudoriasu S Fangīni), known as Number VIII, is an assassin raised to be a member of Chronos from birth. Along with his partner, Kranz, he is extremely violent, leading to the destruction of entire towns while on missions, and extremely loyal. Nicknamed "Baldor", his number is tattooed onto the side of his neck. He and Kranz are tasked with killing the Apostles before Chronos' next strike on Creed, and also participates in the attack on Creed's headquarters using the Sweepers Alliance as a decoy. Out of the pair, Baldor acts as the leader but he will concede to Kranz when the blind man asks. Baldor has a habit of acting first and then reporting his actions to Sephiria. He wields the rocket-boosted flail Heimdall (ヘイムダル, Heimudaru), which only he can wield well enough to use in battle. Baldor is willing to do anything but betray Chronos. Ironically, in the anime he is shown as one of the Zero Numbers that betray and destroy Chronos.

=== David Pepper ===
Voiced by: Takaya Kuroda (Japanese); Daniel Drumm (English)

David Pepper (デイビッド＝ペッパー, Deibiddo Peppā), known as Number IX, is an anime-only character. He is injured by the Apostles of the Stars when a gravity ball crushes him and his foe. Later, it was said that he was buried but it is unknown if he died due to the injuries or if the Zero Numbers killed him. He uses Orichalcum gambling cards called Sigurd (ジークフリード, Jīkufurīdo) as his weapons. He likes talking about gambling while fighting and knows Train.

=== Ash ===
Voiced by: Taketora (Japanese); David Wilson-Brown (English)

Ash (アッシュ, Asshu), formally known as Number X, was a close friend and partner of Nizer until he was killed by Creed. While he is briefly referred to, he never actually appears in the original manga. He was designed exclusively for the anime by series creator Kentaro Yabuki. Ash uses an Orichalcum cane capable of splitting the ground, and has an x-shaped scar on his chin.

=== Lin Shaolee ===
Voiced by: Mitsuki Saiga (Japanese); Jerry Jewell (English)

Lin Shaolee (リン＝シャオリー, Rin Shaorī), known as Number X, is a master of disguise nicknamed the "Magician" (魔術師(マジシャン), Majishan) that can change his appearance in seconds.^{[ch. 75]} He is a new member to the Chronos Numbers, added after Train left the group as the replacement of Ash.^{[ch. 75]} His weapon Seiren (セイレーン, Seirēn), is a mantle that is made of Orichalcum. This allows it to block attacks, such as bullets,^{[ch. 166]} or cut through metal with its edges. He disguises himself as "Glin" (グリン, Gurin) in order to form the Sweeper Alliance (掃除屋同盟, Sōjiya Dōmei) to attack the Apostles as a decoy for Chronos.^{[ch. 124]}

=== Beluga J. Heard ===
Voiced by: Kouji Ishii (Japanese); Gordon Holey (English)

Beluga J. Heard (ベルーガ＝J＝ハード, Berūga J Hādo), known as Number XI, is the long range attacker in the Cerberus assassination squad. He wields an Orichalcum bazooka named Verethraghna (ウルスラグナ, Urusuraguna), which can also change into a large hammer.^{[ch. 72, 79]} Beluga also carries a knife for close-range fighting. Due to his weapon of choice, Beluga is usually used for attacks against groups or nations rather than one-on-one duels. To him, completing the mission with his team is everything and personal feelings can wait until the job is done. He dies helping Jenos and Nizer escape from the Apostles of the Stars' collapsing hideout after a failed attempt on Creed's life due to Jenos' intervention. His last words are disapproving of Jenos' actions, but also thanking Jenos for keeping him from killing his own friend.^{[ch. 87]} In the anime, Beluga dies after pushing himself too far.

=== Mason Ordrosso ===
Voiced by: Rokuro Naya (Japanese); Randy Tallman (English)

Mason Ordrosso (メイソン＝オルドロッソ, Meison Orudorosso), known as Number XII, is the eldest member of the Numbers. He is the wisest and most experienced of the group, and the lone survivor of the war against the Tao-users 25 years ago. Sephiria states that he has been a Chronos Number longer than most of the members including herself have been alive. He only briefly appears during the final attack on the Apostles, going to investigate another of their hideouts with Belze.^{[ch. 184]} His weapon is Á Bao A Qu (ア・バオア・クー, A Baoa Kū). In the anime, Mason replaces Creed as the main antagonist alongside the Doctor in the final story arc. He is featured as the leader of the Zero Numbers, who defect from Chronos and destroy it after planning since the end of the war. Mason's Orichalcum weapon is a golden suit of armor that covers every inch of his body except his face, and also includes two large swords.

== Apostles of the Stars ==
The Apostles of the Stars (星の使徒, Hoshi no Shito) is a revolutionary group led by former Chronos member Creed Diskenth. Their aim is to start a revolution, including overthrowing Chrono's control on the economy. They do not just wish to bring about a world revolution, but they seek revenge against Chronos, each for their own reasons; for example, Shiki and Maro due to the war between the Taoist and Chronos long ago. Some recruits, however, are merely criminals who wish to use their new-found powers to kill for fun. Although Tao has been the primary source of the Apostles' power, Creed also relies on Doctor's investigations in nanomachines to grant him eternal power and elevate him to a god. In the anime, Creed hinted that the Apostles had some partnership with the group Zero Numbers.

Every member of the Apostles of The Stars has the power of Tao (道(タオ), Tao) and the ability to control their chi or life force to perform supernatural abilities. Practitioners possess one of two types of Tao powers by using Soft Chi Kung, a force that accelerates cellular movement through chi; Inner Chi Kung, which manipulates chi inside the body, or Outer Chi Kung, which releases chi outwards. Those who possess the potential awaken these powers through the Shinkitou (神氣湯), an elixir only concocted by born Taoists such as Shiki. Another member of the Apostles, Maro, is also from the Forbidden Continent, and together with Shiki, they bear the most traditional Tao powers, such as controlling and summoning bugs (Shiki), using ink marks (Shiki) and controlling gravity (Maro). Other members of the Apostles rely on more "deviant" powers, such as Creed's Imagine Blade, which is a sword that can expand for 80 meters.

The Apostles have a small army of soldiers, armed with all kinds of weaponry and equipped with special armor that can withstand grenades. They are known as the Shooting Star Unit and show great loyalty to Creed and the other Apostles. There is also an experimental squad of cyborg soldiers, the Kiseitai (鬼星隊; lit. 'Demon Star Force'), that were created by Doctor to be weapons of war.^{[ch. 172]} They were released by Echinda after Doctor's and Eathes' defeat.^{[ch. 171]} However, they were easily defeated by Sven, Eve, and Chronos members IV, VII, VIII and X.

=== Creed Diskenth ===
Voiced by: Shinichiro Miki (Japanese); Chris Patton (English)

Creed Diskenth (クリード＝ディスケンス, Kurīdo Disukensu) is the series' main antagonist. He is the leader of the Apostles of the Stars and Train's former partner before he joined the Chronos Numbers.^{[ch. 14]} He tells the group that their only purpose is to destroy Chronos, but he really plans to make himself immortal using nanomachines and rule the world forever by selectivity controlling the human population.^{[ch. 113]} He is severely warped after being abused by his mother, whom he kills, and the police while living on the streets.^{[ch. 184]} It is stated that Creed had the abilities to be chosen as Chronos Number XIII, but was deemed too unstable and the position went to Train.^{[ch. 27]} He greatly admires Train to the point of obsession, as he thinks of him as the only person in the world that he can relate to. After Train changes during his meetings with Saya, Creed kills her, and makes it his goal to return Train to his previous lifestyle and have him join the Apostles.^{[ch. 14]}

Creed uses his Tao powers to manipulate the hilt of his former sword, Kotetsu (虎徹), to form the Imagine Blade (イマジンブレード, Imajin Burēdo). Its first form, Level 1, is an invisible sword that is able to extend up to eighty meters.^{[ch. 15]} It later evolves into Level 2, a living sword with a mouth and eyes that is directly linked with Creed's emotions. It is able to extend and be manipulated like a whip at will, bite opponents, and break Orichalcum.^{[ch. 82]} Level 3 merges the sword with his arm, with eyes on his shoulder and another large arm extending from his back.^{[ch. 176]} Its final form, Level Max, creates a colossal blade made out of light.^{[ch. 183]} After obtaining The Breath of God nanomachines, Creed becomes able to regenerate from any fatal wound in seconds and he will remain in his peak physical condition forever. The nanomachines' only weakness is that they cannot fully restore the brain, which would leave him with only primal instincts.^{[ch. 169]} However, these are removed from his body after his final battle with Train by Eve.^{[ch. 184]} Train and Chronos allow Creed to walk away, and he is last seen living with Echidna in a country villa, using a wheelchair, with the implication that the physical and mental injuries he sustained in his fight with Train left him vegetative.^{[ch. 185]} In the final episode of the anime, Creed fights Mason so that Train can rescue Eve, and in the end he is seen, again, in the villa in the company of Echidna, quietly painting a landscape.

=== Shiki ===
Voiced by: Mayumi Yamaguchi (Japanese); Greg Ayres (English)

Shiki (シキ) is one of the highest ranking in command of the Apostle of the Stars and one of the first recruited. He is a true Taoist, wearing the clothes from his homeland of Itairiku, a member of the clan whose ancestors started a war against Chronos a quarter of a century ago.^{[ch. 149]} As a true Taoist, Shiki manipulates his chi and can create the special elixir that can grant people with the power of Tao. Shiki's main form of attack is through the use of insect summoning and control, including the fully sentient, humanoid, Setsuki. They are created from his chi, allowing Shiki to create them indefinitely although they eventually self-destruct, as such his Tao power is called Insect. However, besides the insects, he masters the usage of ink seals, using them for manipulating his chi in various ways, ranging from creating a cursed sword, to creating an energy blast and a large dragon made of fire.^{[ch. 148, 149, 150]} Shiki battles Train in order to prove that the Tao are not weak, though Train defeats Shiki to break him of those feelings and show him that there is more to life than proving the Tao to be strongest.^{[ch. 150]} He is last seen with Maro, riding on one of his giant bugs at the series' end. In the anime he joins the Zero Numbers and is killed by Anubis while fighting on Eden against the Chronos numbers and Sweepers. In the Japanese version of the manga, Shiki is revealed to be female^{[ch. 144]}.

=== Charden Flamberg ===
Voiced by: Sho Hayami (Japanese); Kent Williams (English)

Charden Flamberg (シャルデン＝フラムブルグ, Sharuden Furamuburugu) is a member of the Apostles of the Stars. He wears sunglasses and a silk top hat constantly, though he is found to be very attractive to Kyoko after taking them off. He wields the power to control blood,^{[ch. 27]} including blood drawn from his enemies; taking in blood from his opponents, even if they are different types than his, doesn't seem to cause him any ill-effect. Charden wishes to take down Chronos, though he does not agree with Creed's methods, leading him to defect from the group with Kyoko while their castle is being attacked by Cerberus.^{[ch. 82]} Out of all of the Apostles, he is the only one that spoke up about Durham's murder. Charden knows that Creed does not care about them and only sees the Apostles as a means to an end.^{[ch. 88]} Train has him promise to keep away from battle after saving him from death at Sephiria Arks' hands. In the anime, Charden was formerly an assassin.

=== Kyoko Kirisaki ===
Voiced by: Chiemi Chiba (Japanese); Monica Rial (English)

Kyoko Kirisaki (キリサキ＝キョウコ, Kirisaki Kyōko) is an energetic high school student from the island country of Jipangu. Kyoko can easily be considered a ditzy person because of her lack of focus. She has the Tao ability to create and control fire, increasing her body temperature up to a thousand degrees; her favorite way of killing people is kissing them and then incinerating their bodies from the inside out.^{[ch. 17]} She leaves the Apostles of the Stars with Charden, so he will not be lonely.^{[ch. 84]}

Kyoko falls in love with Train when he saves her from a dangerous criminal.^{[ch. 86]} Due to her feelings, she commits herself to Train's own personal philosophy to not kill senselessly; however, her infatuation with Train causes him nothing but an endless amount of headaches.^{[ch. 94]} She adopts a tiny black kitten that likes to ride on her shoulder. After leaving the Apostles, Kyoko returns to her normal schoolgirl life, seen in the company of her school friends.^{[ch. 185]} Kyoko is a popular character in the series, coming in third place in the first two character popularity contests, and fourth in the last.

A character of the same name appears in To Love Ru as a popular idol and star of the TV show Magical Kyoko.

=== Maro ===
Voiced by: Yasuhiko Kawazu (Japanese); Bradford Jackson (English)

Maro (マロ) is a true Taoist and one of the first recruited by Creed, along with Shiki. He is a large sumo wrestler-like man able to control gravity within a certain range. He can create a gravity wall capable of deflecting projectiles, its weakness being when they are fired from above.^{[ch. 133]} He can also launch his punches and roll into a ball to crush opponents. He was defeated by Train, who shot a tranquilizer bullet into his leg.^{[ch. 134]} He is seen riding with Shiki on one of Shiki's giant bugs at the series' end. In the anime, he died in the final assault while fighting David Papper. It was also hinted by Mason that he was part of the Zero Numbers, but was never confirmed.

=== Doctor ===
Voiced by: Yū Mizushima (Japanese); J. Michael Tatum (English)

Doctor (ドクター, Dokutā) is a highly talented scientist from Jipangu interested in nanomachines and one of Creed's closest and first recruited allies. He cares little for human life, which he easily sacrifices and experiments with in order to pursue his goals and further knowledge.^{[ch. 155]} His Tao ability is called Warp World, which allows him to create an alternate world where everything he imagines will become reality, including reattaching an arm.^{[ch. 18]} He can also pull memories from the minds of those trapped in the Warp World, and bring those into reality as well; however, it can backfire if a memory from one of his victims is strong enough to manifest on its own, such as when Saya came from Train's memories and helped him escape Warp World.^{[ch. 160, 163]} At the end of the series, he is last seen hiding from society. In the anime, Doctor is a major antagonist, sharing the role with Mason. With his real name being Kosuke Kanzaki (コウスケ＝カンザキ, Kanzaki Kōsuke), he is revealed to be a member of the Zero Numbers and the former partner of Tearju.

=== Durham Glaster ===
Voiced by: Shinya Fukumatsu (Japanese); R. Bruce Elliott (English)

Durham Glaster (デュラム＝グラスター, Dyuramu Gurasutā) has the ability to channel his chi into his revolver, allowing him to fire destructive balls of energy without regard for ammunition.^{[ch. 49]} His mask also contains a hidden gun in case of emergencies.^{[ch. 51]} He attempts to fight Train in order to prove his status as a gunman, though he is easily defeated. Durham is obsessed with being the best gunman and that desire is what led him to fight Train.^{[ch. 49]} He is ruthlessly slaughtered by Creed afterward for "being selfish."^{[ch. 56]} In the anime, he tried to kill Train during the Apostles' attack on the Summit, but failed thanks to Sven's Vision Eye. He later hunted Train down when his imposter was about, only to get beaten and pummeled for information before being let go and killed by Creed.

=== Echidna Parass ===
Voiced by: Atsuko Tanaka (Japanese); Stephanie Young (English)

Echidna Parass (エキドナ＝パラス, Ekidona Parasu) is an ex-actress whose Tao power, Gate, allows her to create portals from one point in space to another, up to 15 meters away. She can create portals for transportation, or she can create portals for single body parts or projectiles to be shot through, allowing her to attack from numerous angles.^{[ch. 73, 76]} She is one of Creed's closest allies and the first to realize that he never believed that the power of Tao alone could bring about his revolution. She deeply cares for Creed and wishes to live with him as a normal human, although he seems to be oblivious to this until the end.^{[ch. 184]} She vows to continue protecting him until he regains his strength and will to live, and retires to a country villa with a wheelchair-using Creed.^{[ch. 184, 185]}

=== Leon Elliott ===
Voiced by: Junko Minagawa (Japanese); Aaron Dismuke (English)

Leon Elliott (リオン＝エリオット, Rion Eriotto) is a young boy with a hateful distrust of adults and society due to his parents' and sister's death during a civil war in his country.^{[ch. 139]} He travels on a flying board and has the Tao power Wind, enabling him to control air to suffocate people, throw wind gusts, and create a tornado with himself at the center.^{[ch. 42, 139]} Leon hates being referred to as a child, being easily provoked when called such, and thinks girls are inherently weaker than boys. He leaves the Apostles after making a promise to Eve to leave if he loses to her in combat.^{[ch. 139]} He saves Train and Creed from falling from the mansion after their final battle, and is last seen traveling with Eathes.^{[ch. 184, 185]} In the anime, he is the one who provides fireworks to attract Eve (and thus the Eden too) away from Palmila City. He seems to think that Eve is similar to Layla. It is also hinted in the anime that Leon might like Eve.

=== Eathes ===
Eathes (エーテス, Ētesu) is a monkey gifted with the ability to understand human language and speak after drinking the Tao potion. He can also project his soul into another being's soul, allowing him to completely transform into them. He is granted all of their memories and abilities, though he is often unable to use them to their full potential.^{[ch. 109]} He frightfully admits defeat to Train's crew and escorts them to Creed – which he is later branded as a traitor and sent to be killed by the experimental Phantom Star Brigade. After being defeated and then saved by Eve, Eathes saves her from a grenade by Echidna, and at the series end is seen with Leon in one of his human disguises.^{[ch. 181, 185]}

=== Deak Slathky ===
Deak Slathky (ディーク＝スラスキー, Dīku Surasukī) wields the power to produce and control ice. He can attack using shards of ice, create an ice barrier around his body, or even freeze his enemies with his touch. He joins the Apostles when they help him escape from prison after stalking and murdering four girls before storing them in a freezer. He is beaten by Sven using the Grasper Eye, with the Sweeper named Silphy delivering the final blow.^{[ch. 142, 143]}

=== Preta Ghoul ===
Voiced by: Susumu Chiba (Japanese); Taliesin Jaffe (English)

Preta Ghoul (プレタ＝グール, Pureta Gūru) is a former priest who murdered sixteen people before going to jail and being broken out by the Apostles.^{[ch. 135]} Through Tao, he gains the ability to decay and rot anything that comes into contact with his body.^{[ch. 133]} He can also extend his aura to affect the surrounding area. He tag-teams with Maro in fighting Train and River, and is later defeated by River.^{[ch. 135]} The anime features him being captured by Saya, leading him to become obsessed with revenge against her despite the fact she has long been dead. He is encountered and defeated by Sven during the final assault on the Apostles' base.

== Other sources ==
General

- Character page at Tokyo Broadcasting System
- Voice actors at Tokyo Broadcasting System

Specific
