= Black Cat (manga) =

Japanese manga series

- 20th and final tankōbon volume cover
- Genre: Adventure; Science fiction; Thriller
- Manga
- Written by: Kentaro Yabuki
- Published by: Shueisha
- English publisher: AUS: Madman Entertainment; NA: Viz Media
- Imprint: Jump Comics
- Magazine: Weekly Shōnen Jump
- English magazine: NA: Shonen Jump
- Original run: July 11, 2000 – June 14, 2004
- Volumes: 20
- Anime television series
- Directed by: Shin Itagaki
- Produced by: Masaya Shinozaki; Naoki Watanabe; Taito Okiura; Takashi Takano; Tetsuo Daitoku
- Written by: Shūichi Kōyama
- Music by: Taku Iwasaki
- Studio: Gonzo
- Licensed by: Crunchyroll (Note: Formerly known as Funimation.); AUS: Madman Entertainment; UK: MVM Films
- Original network: TBS
- English network: AUS: Adult Swim; SEA: Animax; US: Funimation Channel; ZA: Animax
- Original run: October 6, 2005 – March 30, 2006
- Episodes: 23 + 1
- Light novel
- Written by: Tomohito Ōsaki
- Illustrated by: Kentaro Yabuki
- Published by: Shueisha
- Imprint: Jump J-Books
- Original run: March 10, 2003 – October 24, 2005
- Volumes: 3
- icon

Black Cat (stylized in all caps) is a Japanese manga series written and illustrated by Kentaro Yabuki. It was originally serialized in publisher Shueisha's shōnen manga magazine Weekly Shōnen Jump from July 2000 to June 2004, with the chapters later collected into twenty tankōbon (bound volumes) by Shueisha. The story centers on a man named Train Heartnet who withdrew from an elite group of assassins called the Chronos Numbers to become a bounty hunter.

The series was adapted into a twenty-four episode anime television series by studio Gonzo, which originally aired on Tokyo Broadcasting System (TBS) from October 2005 to March 2006. The manga was licensed for English-language publication in North America by Viz Media and in Australasia by Madman Entertainment. Funimation Entertainment licensed the anime for an English dub and North American broadcast on their own Funimation Channel, with Madman releasing it in Australasia and MVM Films in the United Kingdom.

In Japan, the Black Cat manga sold over 12 million copies, while in North America several volumes have been featured in weekly top ten lists of best-selling manga. The anime has also been popular in both Japan and North America. Manga and anime critics had praise for Black Cat's action, differing views on the artwork and characters, and mainly negative comments for its plot which has been criticized for having typical elements of shōnen manga (targeted at boys).

== Plot ==
Set in a fictional universe, Train Heartnet, once an assassin for Chronos, an organization bent on world peace that rules one third of the world's economy, is now an easygoing Sweeper (licensed bounty hunter) traveling with his partner Sven Vollfied. They meet and team up with professional thief Rinslet Walker in order to break into an arms dealer's home and obtain some data, but encounter a human bio-weapon named Eve that was created using nanotechnology. Sven and Train ultimately decide to free Eve from her owner and train her to be a Sweeper. Rinslet is kidnapped by Creed Diskenth, a former Chronos assassin that killed Train's friend Saya Minatsuki for changing Train's outlook on life and which contributed to him leaving Chronos, to persuade Train to join his group the Apostles of the Stars in order to overthrow Chronos and start a world revolution. The duel ends as a draw, with both Creed and Train injured.

The Apostles of the Stars launch their first attack on the World Summit, killing the leaders from 20 top nations, causing Chronos to declare war on them. Chronos even notify Train of a new Sweeper bounty on Creed in order to gain his help, though he resists, planning to go after him on his own terms. Chronos assassin Jenos Hazard is sent to hire Rinslet to gather information on the Apostles, however, this is really in order to use her as bait to lure Creed out of hiding and force Train to get involved, who was lured to the same area via false Sweeper intel. Jenos and the other two members of the special unit Cerebus launch an assault on Creed's lair, that results in it being turned to rubble, while Train simply rescues Rinslet and leaves. Creed then tries to kill Sven, believing he is holding Train back from joining him, but accidentally shoots Train with a nanomachine-enhanced bullet that has the unplanned effect of reverting his body to that of a child. In order to return Train to normal, Train, Sven and Eve visit nanotechnology expert Dr. Tearju, who is also Eve's creator. While there, the Apostles of the Stars attack to force Tearju to join them in order to grant Creed eternal life through nanomachines, but are defeated by a returned Train who can now fire a railgun shot thanks to the nanomachines. However, Eathes was able to copy Tearju, gaining all of her knowledge, and Train, Sven and Eve finally decide to put a stop to Creed.

They team up with a group called the Sweeper Alliance to storm the Apostles of the Stars' island, organized by Chronos assassin Lin Shaolee in disguise to act as decoys for Chronos' own attack. Separated upon arriving, Train, Sven and Eve each get involved in fights with members of the Apostles, while Chronos, who landed after them, get to Creed first. Sephiria Arks faces off against Creed, but loses. Sven, Eve and Chronos then fight bio-warrior weapons fused with nanotechnology, while Train begins his battle with Creed. Creed has obtained immortality, although he reveals to Train his only weakness; his brain cannot be repaired like the rest of his body. Train defeats Creed using one last full-powered railgun shot to destroy his Imagine Blade and Eve uses her own nanomachines to take those that give Creed immortality out of his body. Train and Sephiria allow Creed to walk away, and the survivors of the Apostles of the Stars are shown on the run or hiding.

== Production ==
Six months before Black Cat began, Kentaro Yabuki's one-shot version titled Stray Cat was published. While it already included Sweepers and Tao, Train and Sven were Delivery Men instead. With Black Cat he wanted to expand on ideas he used in his previous serial Yamato Gensoki; an assassin betraying an organization, and the use of chi or life energy. His weekly schedule was four days to write the chapter and two to draw it, taking one day off. When the manga ended serialization, Yabuki expressed desire to make a sequel labeling this series as "Part 1". As he was not sure if there could be a sequel, he still remarked that the characters of Train Heartnet and Eve may appear in other titles he will create in the future.

== Media ==
=== Manga ===
Written and illustrated by Kentaro Yabuki, Black Cat was originally serialized in Shueisha in the shōnen manga anthology Weekly Shōnen Jump from July 11, 2000, (Note: It debuted in the magazine's 32nd issue of 2000 (cover date July 24), released on July 11 of that same year.) to June 14, 2004. Its 185 chapters were collected into 20 tankōbon (bound volumes) by Shueisha, released from January 6, 2001, to October 4, 2004. The series was re-released in twelve bunkobon format volumes, published from September 16, 2005, to February 17, 2006. Black Cat has also been published as part of the Shueisha Jump Remix series of magazine-style books. Nine volumes were released between March 24, and July 19, 2008.

It was licensed in English in North America by Viz Media as they first announced at the 2005 San Diego Comic-Con. The first volume released on March 7, 2006, with the final volume released on May 5, 2009. Madman Entertainment published Viz's English release in Australia and New Zealand, from September 10, 2008, to June 10, 2009.

=== Anime ===
A 24-episode animated adaptation of the manga was produced by Shueisha, GDH, Tokyo Broadcasting System (TBS), and Gonzo. It is directed by Shin Itagaki, with Shūichi Kōyama handling series composition, Yukiko Akiyama designing the characters and Taku Iwasaki composing the music. The series was broadcast on TBS from October 6, 2005, to March 30, 2006. Episode fifteen was not broadcast by TBS, but only included in the DVD release in Japan. On its airing on Animax all episodes were broadcast. The series was released across twelve Region 2 DVD volumes from December 21, 2005, to November 22, 2006, by GDH. Each volume was also published by Animate and Movic in Premium Edition which included various extras. The DVD volumes were gathered in a limited release DVD box set by Gonzo on April 23, 2008.

The anime was licensed for an English-language dubbed release by Funimation Entertainment (later Crunchyroll, LLC) in June 2006. The episodes were later broadcast on the Funimation Channel. The series was then released across six Region 1 DVD volumes released between December 19, 2006, and July 24, 2007. The DVDs were gathered in a box set and released on March 18, 2008. On May 29, 2012, Funimation re-released the box set in a "Super Amazing Value Edition" (S.A.V.E.) edition. Madman Entertainment distributed a box set of the series in the PAL region on September 17, 2008, while MVM Films released it on November 15, 2010, in the United Kingdom.

An anime soundtrack entitled Black Cat Original Soundtrack Nikukyu was released on March 15, 2006, by EMI Music Japan. It contains the anime's background music that was composed by Taku Iwasaki, and the three pieces of theme music used for the series: the opening theme "Daia no Hana" (ダイアの花; lit. "Diamond Flower") by Yorico, the first ending theme "Namida Boshi" (ナミダボシ; lit. "Tears of Stars") by Puppypet, and the second ending theme "Kutsuzure" (くつずれ; lit. "Blisters") by Ryōji Matsuda.

=== Other media ===
Tomohito Ōsaki wrote three light novels based on the series. Simply titled Black Cat and Black Cat 2, the first two were released on March 10, and August 25, 2003. Titled Black Cat: Hoshi no Zanshou (BLACK CAT 星の残照; lit. "The Star's Afterglow"), the last one that serves as the sequel to the manga, was released in Japan on October 24, 2005.

In 2005, there were three drama CDs, simply titled Black Cat 1–3, released by Shueisha on February 28, July 1, and October 4, respectively. An internet radio program was broadcast from March 30, to September 28, 2006, by the Onsen and hosted by Takashi Kondō and Misato Fukuen, the voice of Train and Eve respectively. Later, Frontier Works collected in into three CDs and released on October 21, November 18, and December 16, 2006.

There have been two video games based on the series released in Japan. Black Cat: Kikai Shikake no Tenshi (BLACK CAT 〜機械仕掛けの天使〜; lit. "The Mechanical Angel") was released for the PlayStation 2 on March 30, 2006, by Capcom. Black Cat: Kuroneko no Concerto (BLACK CAT 黒猫の協奏曲; lit. "The Black Cat's Concerto") was released for the Nintendo DS on June 21, 2007, by Compile Heart. Characters of the Black Cat series have also made appearances in the games Jump Super Stars and Jump Ultimate Stars. In Japan, various other types of merchandise were released, including action figures, plush dolls, key chains, clothing, cosplay pieces, and a trading card game by Movic.

== Reception ==
=== Public response ===
Black Cat's twenty volumes have sold over 12 million units in Japan. Volumes from Viz's English publication of the series have also featured in best-selling manga rankings such as The New York Times as well as Nielsen BookScan. During 2006, Black Cat was North America's 9th best manga property, according to ICv2. In ICv2's Top 50 Manga, Black Cat was listed as the 15th manga property from North America during the first half of 2008. In ICv2's Top 25 Manga Properties Q1 2009, it was the 22nd best manga property from North America during 2009's first quarter.

The Black Cat anime premiered in Japan with a 3.4 percent television viewership rating. In 2006, Japanese television network TV Asahi conducted a "Top 100" online web poll, and Black Cat placed 93rd. In the subsequent year, it ranked 17th in a "Top 20" poll conducted by Japanese anime magazine Animage. Navarre Corporation cited the DVD releases of Black Cat as one of the reasons for Funimation's profit increase during the last quarter of 2006. The anime was listed as North America's 22nd anime property in summer 2008.

=== Critical response ===
The manga has been praised for its fast-paced action, which "epitomizes the action genre", according to Anime News Network's Carlo Santos. Alexander Hoffman from Comics Village praised Yabuki for starting the story off with action rather than having a large amount of "info-dumps" for extensive character introductions. Writing for Manga Life, Michael Aronson commended it for having a restrained pace, layout and action scenes, calling it "more western" than Japanese because of it. Holly Ellingwood of Active Anime commented that Black Cat "knows how to pack the action and the excitement to good effect, visuals and nail-biting suspense." Sheena McNeil stressed that despite its flaws the series' action "makes it all worth reading." Ken Haley of Pop Culture Shock said that "writing and characterization-wise" it is a typical shōnen manga. Santos, Hoffman and McNeil criticized its plot for being "predictable", clichéd, and "not terribly original" respectively. Leroy Douresseaux of Comic Book Bin called it "an easy going version of Bleach", while Hoffman found it reminiscent of Cowboy Bebop, and McNeil compared it to Dragon Ball Z.

Santos called its art "plain", while McNeil commented that it "is very nice" but "there's nothing wow-ing about it," and likewise Haley considered the art enough to get "the job done", but that none of the characters are "cool or eye-catching". Conversely, Hoffman labeled the art "expressive", and Douresseaux deemed the character designs "imaginative." While Aronson and Hoffman dubbed the characters "likeable" and "memorable," Douresseaux asserted Yabuki "create[d] a joyful jumble of motivations and backstabbing" for them. On the other hand, Santos affirmed they "just don't feel real" as their motivations "aren't emotionally moving in any way; they're just plot points that give the characters motivation."

The contrast between "Train's seriousness and Sven's comedy" was appreciated by Sandra Scholes of Active Anime. Margaret Viera of the same site hailed its comedy usage as "well done and perfectly placed within the storyline." Its mixture of genres was appreciated by Scholes, as well as by IGN's Jeff Harris who said "it never appears too overdone." Ross Liversidge of UK Anime Network, however, commented that this makes it "a little hard to discern what the series is aiming for." While Stig Høgset, writing for THEM Anime Reviews, said the supernatural powers are "kept at a fairly realistic level", Liversidge felt the anime's ending was "just slightly too fantastical to be taken seriously." Høgset and Harris praised the show's imagery, with the latter claiming that it has a "story that in many ways improves on the original manga and fixes some of its problems."
