= List of To Love Ru characters =

The main female characters of To Love Ru and To Love Ru Darkness

The Japanese manga series To Love Ru and its sequel To Love Ru Darkness feature an extensive cast of characters created by author Saki Hasemi and illustrator Kentaro Yabuki. After high school student Rito Yuuki accidentally gets engaged to Lala Satalin Deviluke, the runaway crown princess of the alien planet Deviluke, he reluctantly helps her transition to life on Earth, while gradually befriending his dream girl, Haruna Sairenji. Along the way, Rito meets and gets entangled with a colorful cast of other girls (both humans and aliens alike), such as the uptight, high-strung Yui Kotegawa, the sex-switching alien Run/Ren, and the queen bee of their school, Saki Tenjouin. At the same time, Rito must fight off Lala's antagonistic alien suitors, one of whom sends the assassin Golden Darkness to kill him.

Hasemi said that the latter half of the manga features a lot more quirky and unique characters because, the newer the character, the harder he and Yabuki had to work to establish their personality. Yabuki said that by the latter half of the series, they were treating all the female characters as main heroines. Many of the characters also make a cameo appearance in the manga version of Mayoi Neko Overrun!, which Yabuki illustrated.

== Main characters ==
=== Rito Yuuki ===
Rito Yuuki as seen in the anime

Voiced by: Akeno Watanabe (Japanese); Ry McKeand (Rito), Avery Smithhart (Riko) (English)

Rito Yuuki (結城 梨斗, Yūki Rito) is a 15-year-old high school student at Sainan High and the main protagonist of the series. His younger sister, Mikan, comments he is very good at the most "pointless things", like crane and festival games such as catching fish and squirt guns. Rito is an accomplished florist, gardener, and horticulturalist. He is extremely kind, selfless, caring, and thoughtful, having a lot of respect for women, though mostly by intention, and not so much by success. It is only by accident that he encounters Lala Satalin Deviluke, and despite his enduring feelings for Haruna Sairenji, Rito develops deeper affection towards Lala throughout the story, but is unsure if what he feels is love. At the end of To Love Ru, he confesses his love to Lala but tells her he loves Haruna more. However, she misunderstands and is happy at the prospect of him being married to both of them. In contrast, polygamy is illegal in Japan. Once he is king of the galaxy, the laws of Earth no longer apply. By the end of To Love Ru Darkness, Rito earns Haruna's mutual feelings; in addition to Lala, Run, Yami, and Momo. The ending suggests that his love troubles will persist indefinitely.

Due to his shyness around girls, he is very clumsy and has great difficulty maintaining his composure around any sort of stimulating situation, which leads him to accidentally molest or grope the many girls in the series. Due to the otherworldly circumstances around him, Rito is always put, along with many different girls, in any and each type of awkward, intimate, and embarrassing situations, such as when he and Haruna were once teleported naked together to the basement of Mikado's medical clinic because of one of Lala's faulty inventions, or when Lala used the same invention to send them naked to the school. In To Love Ru Darkness, his clumsiness becomes even more frequent and violating as well as strangely inventive and surreal. He has shown to be able to accomplish difficult feats, such as reaching his hands or various objects into the clothing and undergarments of girls or partially stripped off their clothing, and also grabbed several private parts of several girls all at once, all of which were purely by accident. In a later chapter of Darkness, Mikado conducts some experiments to gather some data and later interviews Rito. Mikado diagnoses that Rito's frequent godly indecency and unwitting perverted acts manifest because of the way Rito extremely restrained himself with the girls since he never sought the opportunity to get intimate with them and wanted to treat them with kindness, causing his "libido" to accumulate and release in form of accidentally groping girls' bodies and all other perverted stuff happening so far, calling it the "Cataplectic Indecency Syndrome". She also believes that the more he suppresses it, the more extreme and unbelievable the accidents will be. Mikado calls this not a disease, but rather a talent that is beyond an average human. During the first manga series, continuing into Darkness (and present in some episodes of Motto To Love Ru), Rito also seems to suffer from Sexsomnia. This can most often be observed with Momo being on the receiving end of it.

When he is turned into a girl, Rito takes on the persona of Riko Yuusaki (夕崎 梨子, Yūsaki Riko). She is a beautiful girl (with a physical appearance resembling a tomboy) who gets much attention from men, such as Motemitsu, the principal, and even Saruyama, Rito's best friend. Later, Saruyama falls in love with Riko and asks Lala to invite her for a date; out of pity, she forcefully changes Rito into Riko so Saruyama can go on the date. After that, Riko only appears for a short number of times on rare occasions. Her last appearance was in Chapter 74 of Darkness manga when Nemesis changed her sex through boy-girl change-kun.

Saki Hasemi and Kentaro Yabuki initially imagined To Love Ru as mainly a comedy featuring Rito and Lala, with Rito only longing for Haruna. But as they had more meetings, this changed to Haruna also being a featured character with feelings for Rito, to emphasize the love triangle. They took care to make sure that Rito was likeable and that his actions were not unpleasant. Hasemi said that because it ran in a shōnen magazine, if boys did not like and support the protagonist, then drawing cute girls would be meaningless. Riko, Rito's female form, was thought up as something special for the 100th chapter and to celebrate two years of serialization. They never intended for her to reappear, but she did so very quickly because she was shockingly well received. Rito is one of the most popular characters in the series, coming in fifth place in the manga's first character popularity poll.

=== Lala Satalin Deviluke ===
Lala Satalin Deviluke (ララ・サタリン・デビルーク, Rara Satarin Debirūku) is the first princess of Deviluke, whose family rules the Milky Way galaxy. As such, her hand in marriage is sought from across the galaxy as her husband will be successor to the throne. A rather childish girl, she is naïve regarding the culture and customs on Earth. Lala initially runs away from home, as she does not wish to marry any of her suitors, and randomly ends up naked in Rito's bathtub due to one of her inventions. Upon arriving on Earth, Lala pretends to love Rito to keep herself from getting married but really does fall in love with him after she misinterprets a statement that Rito shouts that was meant for Haruna. Although Lala appears to be somewhat airheaded, she is well known on Deviluke for her genius-level intellect and enjoys making all manners of inventions, often prompting some disastrous effect or another.

=== Haruna Sairenji ===
Haruna Sairenji (西連寺 春菜, Sairenji Haruna) is Rito's classmate, and the girl of his affections. Unbeknownst to Rito, Haruna has similar feelings for him, having been attracted to his kind, gentle nature since junior high. Despite her growing love for the boy (which she believes to be unrequited), she usually suppresses her feelings and cannot confess to him because of her friendship with Lala. However, with some encouragement and knowing that she cannot continue to hide her feelings, Haruna eventually tells Lala of her ordeal. Lala warmly accepts Haruna as her rival for Rito's heart, while still remaining friends.

=== Mikan Yuuki ===
Mikan Yuuki (結城 美柑, Yūki Mikan) is Rito's independent and reliable 12-year-old sister. With their parents often away on business, she takes care of the housework. In contrast to her brother, she is very mature, but does not hesitate to tease him; calling him a "playboy" for attracting so many girls all of a sudden. Mikan is very perceptive and notices Rito's obvious anxiety around Haruna and Yui's hidden feelings for him. Mikan also seems to have a certain lack of respect for Rito, rarely addressing him by his honorific as an older brother. Although she may not show it often, she cares deeply for Rito and misses his company, to the point one could suspect her of having a brother complex. She also states how she and Rito used to play together before Lala entered their lives.

=== Golden Darkness ===
Golden Darkness (金色の闇, Konjiki no Yami), commonly nicknamed "Yami" (ヤミ), is a dispassionate, withdrawn galactic assassin hired by Lacospo to kill Rito Yuuki. Although she can accomplish this easily, after seeing Rito's true nature, she stays on Earth and claims to be continuing her contract to assassinate him. But is really ignoring it because she wants to stay on Earth. Though she maintains she will kill Rito one day, it becomes increasingly doubtful that she will ever do it and actually develops feelings for him instead.

=== Yui Kotegawa ===
Voiced by: Kaori Nazuka (Japanese); Amber Lee Connors (English)

Yui Kotegawa (古手川 唯, Kotegawa Yui) is an uptight, high-strung girl placed in Rito's class during their second year of high school. Her haughty opinions, quick temper, and habit of speaking her mind often result in her vocally reprimanding classmates. Yui has no tolerance for anything she considers "indecent behavior" and is well aware that Rito and Lala are the most brazen offenders; often yelling her trademark phrase, "Salacious!" (ハレンチな!, Harenchi na!), in the face of their acts of perversion. Ironically, she begins to secretly develop feelings for Rito after he saves her from a group of delinquents. Though her inexperience with boys leaves her unable to understand her feelings and is continually in self-denial about them. Usually, when Rito asks what is wrong, she says the exact opposite of what she wants to say and then hurts him in some way. Although her nature prevents her from easing her behavior, she slowly warms up to his usual antics. After Celine takes on her childlike form, she becomes close to Yui, even being seen as a daughter-like figure in Yui's daydreams of her and Rito being married together. Yui also really likes cats and, in To Love Ru Darkness, she realizes that Rito was the young boy she saw rescue a cat stuck in a tree years earlier, an act that defied her belief that boys are rude and salacious. A running gag in the series is that some characters cannot remember Kotegawa's family name, calling her "Kokegawa" for example.

Yui was created as a series regular to celebrate one year of serialization. She was given an abundance of common sense and a serious personality, making her a tsundere. In a series full of characters who lack common sense, Yui plays the "straight man" role. Yui was the character that was planned to have the most character growth, as she was the only one who would bring up the perverted stuff Rito does to them. Yabuki, however, said he did not expect her to turn into such a serious love interest. Yui is one of the most popular characters in the series, coming in sixth place in the manga's first character popularity poll.

=== Nana Astar Deviluke ===
Nana Astar Deviluke (ナナ・アスタ・デビルーク, Nana Asuta Debirūku) is the second princess of Deviluke. She is the daughter of King Gid and Queen Sephie, the younger sister of Lala, and the older twin sister of Momo. Of the entire female cast in the To Love Ru series, Nana appears to be the least attracted to Rito, although she too eventually develops romantic feelings for him as the series progresses.

=== Momo Belia Deviluke ===
Momo Belia Deviluke (モモ・ベリア・デビルーク, Momo Beria Debirūku) is the third princess of Deviluke. She is the daughter of King Gid and Queen Sephie, the younger sister of Lala, and the younger twin sister of Nana. Both twins flee to Earth to escape their studies on their home planet Deviluke. While Nana is able to communicate with animals, Momo has the unique ability to speak to plants. Although a recurring secondary character in the original To Love Ru series, Momo becomes the main female protagonist in the sequel To Love Ru Darkness, in which she plots to build a harem of girls around Rito Yuuki, whom she falls in love with.

=== Mea Kurosaki ===
Voiced by: Yuka Iguchi (Japanese); Kira Vincent-Davis (English)

Mea Kurosaki (黒咲 芽亜, Kurosaki Mea) is a first-year student at Sainan High who is introduced in To Love Ru Darkness. She is the classmate of Nana and Momo, and quickly becomes friends with Nana after learning she can understand animals. Known as "Red-haired Mea" (赤毛のメア), she is Golden Darkness' "little sister" and is also a living transformation weapon who can transform any part of her body into weapons. As part of the second generation based on data from Golden Darkness' development, Mea can "Psycho Dive" (精神侵入（サイコダイブ）) into other organisms and connect to their minds, learning all of their thoughts in the process, and control their body. Nemesis, Mea's "master", wants Mea to restore Golden Darkness to her heartless assassin self by killing Rito. After using Psycho Dive on him, Mea becomes interested in Momo's harem plan and shows sexual interest in Rito, much to the shock of Nana. Eventually, through her friendship with Nana and Golden Darkness' encouragement, Mea develops emotions and desires to live her life as she pleases. Nemesis is revealed to have been transfused to Mea's mind and body since they met. But Mea manages to overcome her with help from Oshizu and breaks ties with Nemesis, though she still cares for her.

=== Nemesis ===
Voiced by: Rina Hidaka (Japanese); Genevieve Simmons (English)

Nemesis (ネメシス, Nemeshisu) is Mea's "master", who is behind the plan to make Golden Darkness return to life as an assassin. Nemesis has long black hair, golden eyes, a small and slender body, and dark skin. She is a transformation weapon, but a different type than Golden Darkness and Mea as she is a thought-entity lifeform made of dark matter, allowing her to become particulate or substantive at will. Her transformation ability is Transfusion (変身・融合（トランス・フュージョン）), which allows her to fuse body and mind with flesh-and-blood organisms. Unbeknownst to Mea, Nemesis transfused with her when they first met. Nemesis only reveals herself to Rito and his friends after Mea develops emotions, stating that the "Darkness" in Golden Darkness will awaken without her having to intervene, so she will simply watch and have fun until it does. Nemesis has sexual interest in Rito, but unlike the other girls, hers is often of dominance and she refers to him as her servant. Momo has an antagonistic personality toward her, but Nemesis actually likes the third princess, although that does not stop her from teasing her. The "Darkness" Nemesis refers to is a prototype transformation hidden within Golden Darkness that has an insatiable thirst for destruction and is powerful enough to destroy planets. By unleashing it, Nemesis hopes to plunge the galaxy into war once again. This goal ultimately leads to a battle between Nemesis and Gid Lucion Deviluke, during which Nemesis is fatally injured. In order to stop her from vanishing, Rito allows Nemesis to inhabit his body, much to Momo's chagrin. After recovering and separating from him, Nemesis comes to fully understand Rito and tries to help him and all the women in love with him, but in her own way. She says her only reason for living now is to torment Rito and Momo, but she wants Momo to stop hiding her true self and face her for Rito's heart.

== Secondary characters ==
=== Peke ===
Voiced by: Satomi Arai, Aki Toyosaki (Motto To Love Ru) (Japanese); Holly Segarra (English)

Peke (ペケ) is Lala's all-costume robot, who acts as a module to form her clothing. Peke is exceptionally devoted to Lala and has the ability to shapeshift into any kind of clothing for her to wear, but this also drains his power supply. He can also scan the clothing of people around him and duplicate those clothes. As his batteries run out, the clothing Lala wears will slowly dissolve, until it completely disappears. To recharge, Peke simply needs to sleep. Using a dress-form program, Peke has the ability to take on a human form, with the appearance of a young child. Peke came in ninth place in the manga's first character popularity poll.

=== Risa & Mio ===
Voiced by: Ryoka Yuzuki (Risa) and Chiemi Chiba (Mio) (Japanese); Margaret McDonald (Risa) and Juliet Simmons (Mio) (English)

Risa Momioka (籾岡 里紗, Momioka Risa) and Mio Sawada (沢田 未央, Sawada Mio) are the mischievous and cheerful, best friends of Haruna. Risa and Mio are a pair of inseparable girls, spending as much time as they can with her and Lala, and whenever the latter inquires about Earth's culture and habits, they divulge as much information as they can (although it is often misleading and perverted). Risa and Mio are known for their playful habit of groping the breasts of other girls and whispering naughty things into their ears to tease them, with Haruna as their most recurring victim; they like to do this with her mainly in front of Rito, in addition to also teasing Haruna about her feelings for him. While Mio enjoys cosplay and works part-time at a maid café, Risa is a member of Sainan High's tennis club-like Haruna, but she mostly skips it to do other things. In To Love Ru Darkness, Risa seems to develop feelings for Rito after Nemesis forces his body to make sexual advances towards her.

Risa and Mio were created specifically to be Haruna's friends. Hasemi speculated that Risa is a sadist and Mio is a masochist. Because they tend to take charge, he said the two are useful when they need to move the story somewhere.

=== Run & Ren ===
Voiced by: Fuyuka Oura (Japanese); Greg Ayres (Ren), Christina Kelly (Run) (English)

Run & Ren Elise Jewelria (ルン&レン・エルシ・ジュエリア, Run & Ren Erishe Jueria) is a childhood friend of Lala. As a member of the royal family from the planet Memorze (メモルゼ, Memoruze), they change sex in both mind and body upon triggering a specific stimulus; Run being female and Ren being male. Mikado speculates that the reason a simple sneeze is now enough to trigger the switch on Earth, is due to the differences between it and planet Memorze. Ren is famous for wearing girls' clothing every single day with Lala when he was a child. He arrives on Earth to win Lala by proving he is "man enough" for her but becomes jealous of her relationship with Rito. Due to his pursuit of her, he accidentally gives Rito his first kiss. While Ren is furious, it has an unexpected consequence on Run. She falls in love with Rito, and blames Lala for her misfortunes, while Ren is still in the competition, albeit one-sided, with Rito for Lala's hand in marriage. Run often tries to use items bought via "Galactic Mail Order" to mess with Lala, only for them to backfire on herself. Run becomes a famous idol, with a successful music and acting career. She befriends Kyouko Kirisaki after earning the role of antagonist "Blue Metallia" on her TV show. In To Love Ru Darkness, the relationship between Rito and Run is deepened. Just as Rito realizes that he has neglected Run's feelings and she bursts into tears at the awareness that he will never see her as a girl because of her dual nature, the two personalities of Ren and Run permanently separate into two distinct bodies. This maturation is a tertiary sex characteristic of Memorzians when they come of age, and ends the embarrassing sex change problem.

When Ren was first introduced, Hasemi and Yabuki had already decided on his changing into Run, and foreshadowed it by having a joke where he wears girls' clothes. But Run's debut was postponed because they wanted Ren to make Rito realize his own feelings for Lala. They considered day/night, lightning (or something weather related), and a particular food for initiating the change between Run and Ren, before settling on sneezing because it can be sudden. Hasemi described Ren as single-minded, while he and Yabuki had to use a process of elimination for Run's personality because of all the female characters. She was initially a "dummy", but they decided to take her in a dark, two-faced direction. Run came in eighth place in the manga's first character popularity poll, while Ren came in 15th.

=== Saki Tenjouin ===
Voiced by: Ayako Kawasumi (Japanese); Maggie Flecknoe (English)

Saki Tenjouin (天条院 沙姫, Tenjōin Saki) is the self-proclaimed queen bee of Sainan High. Saki is a pretty, popular, and rich girl who believes herself to be Lala's rival (who is totally oblivious to Saki's animosity towards her and, ironically, thinks of Saki as a good friend of hers). Due to Lala getting more attention from people, Saki, stating there can only be one "queen" in Sainan High, consistently tries to one-up her, going to any possible means to prove that she is better than Lala, even though her plans usually backfire and she ends up embarrassing herself in many different ways; the most frequent result is her getting naked in front of a crowd. Saki is one of the few female characters who does not have romantic feelings toward Rito, most of her appearances seem to only serve the purpose of being a victim to the perverted mishaps that surround him. Instead, Saki has a crush on Zastin, which left her horrified to discover that he, by chance, is the personal bodyguard of Lala, but this made her even more determined to win his heart at any cost. In the anime, however, Saki occasionally tries to seduce Rito in order to make Lala jealous.

Saki was created to have a senpai character and a character from the upper class of society, who looks down on everyone and speaks her mind. Hasemi said her wealth makes it easy to develop events and advance the story. Saki is one of the most popular characters in the series, coming in seventh place in the manga's first character popularity poll.

=== Ryouko Mikado ===
Voiced by: Masako Joh (2008–12), Harumi Sakurai (2012–) (Japanese); Marissa Lenti (English)

Ryouko Mikado (御門 涼子, Mikado Ryōko) is the provocatively-dressed school nurse of Sainan High. As an extraterrestrial underground doctor, Ryouko helps out other aliens on Earth with medical care, in addition to the human populace. After Ryouko gives her an artificial body to inhabit, Oshizu acts as her assistant both at school and the private practice she operates out of her house. Formerly an operative for a shadowy, black market extraterrestrial organization bent on overthrowing Gid Lucion Deviluke, she fled to Earth in hopes of hiding from her superiors. In To Love Ru Darkness, Ryouko is often left watching over Celine while everyone else is in class. She eventually tracks down Tearju Lunatique, her childhood friend and Golden Darkness's creator, and brings her to Earth.

Because the other females are all young high school students, Mikado was introduced to inject more adult appeal into To Love Ru. Hasemi said he did not want to make her a comedic character, but it is a delicate balance not making her too serious either. Although the character has a history with galactic organizations and Golden Darkness, he said showing that in the story would take her away from Rito and company, making it more of a side story. But he hoped to include a little of it at some point. Mikado came in 12th place in the manga's first character popularity poll.

=== Oshizu ===
Voiced by: Mamiko Noto (Japanese); Melissa Molano (seasons 1-3), Jad Saxton (season 4) (English)

Oshizu (お静) is the ghost of Shizu Murasame (村雨 静, Murasame Shizu), a girl who died 400 years ago. The O (お) in "Oshizu" is a Japanese honorific used to refer to women. She is sincere, kind, and very curious about the modern world, but has a severe fear of dogs. She has telekinesis, which often goes off accidentally when she is frightened, blowing people and her surroundings away. These incidents often result in clothes being ripped apart and Rito ending up in an awkward situation with one of the female characters. Since her meeting with Rito and the others, she begins exploring the world outside the old school building. After possessing her body, Oshizu is aware of Haruna's crush on Rito and becomes very supportive towards cheering Haruna into confessing her feelings to him. Oshizu "returns" to the living after Ryouko creates an artificial body for her to inhabit, built with organic matter. However, she occasionally separates her spirit from the body during brief moments of shock. She lives with Ryouko and works as a nurse at her clinic. In the first anime, Oshizu is not given a new body and her presence is limited, but she does have her artificial body in the OVA releases and later anime adaptations. After possessing and sensing the "darkness" that is Nemesis within her, Oshizu often shows hostility towards Mea and they are the last to become friends. It is thanks to Oshizu's help that Mea is able to chase Nemesis out from her.

Oshizu was not intended to be a regular character, but after she learned that Haruna likes Rito, Yabuki suggested she become one and support Haruna in love and felt it would be fun since Haruna hates ghosts. They gave Oshizu an artificial body to possess because they felt it would be hard having her appear as a ghost all the time, but made sure to emphasize several things; she can easily pop out of the body, she is unsteady when walking, she behaves like a poltergeist (such as having telekinesis), and she lacks knowledge of modern humans. Her fear of dogs is an homage to Little Ghost Q-Taro.

=== Kenichi Saruyama ===
Voiced by: Hiroyuki Yoshino (Japanese); Greg Cote (English)

Kenichi Saruyama (猿山 健一, Saruyama Ken'ichi) is the perverted best friend of Rito. Kenichi has known him since junior high and is more open and obvious of his obsession with girls and is one of the few male characters Rito can talk to about his situations involving Haruna or Lala. He is aware of Rito's feelings for Haruna and consistently advises he get together with her. Kenichi develops a crush on Riko, but does not realize she is actually Rito, who is accidentally transformed into a girl by one of Lala's bizarre inventions.

=== Zastin ===
Voiced by: Takehito Koyasu (Japanese); Scott Gibbs (English)

Zastin (ザスティン, Zasutin) is commander of the Deviluke Royal Guard and Lala's personal bodyguard. Despite being the strongest warrior on Deviluke, Zastin has a horrible sense of direction, resulting in him often getting lost. He also seems to have extremely bad luck, where he keeps getting run over by trains and cars. Initially, Zastin disapproves of Rito, deeming him weak and subsequently seeks to test his strength. However, once Rito exclaims his opinion of marriage in self-defense, Zastin is swayed by his words (though not in the way Rito intends) and summarily approves of him, believing he truly understands Lala's feelings. The gaudy armour-wearing Zastin is often seen with his two sunglasses and suit-wearing subordinates, the blonde-haired Buwatts (ブワッツ, Buwattsu) and the black-haired Maul (マウル, Mauru). All three start working as assistants to Saibai Yuuki on his manga, with the funds earned going to Lala as an allowance. Zastin then shows a keen interest in becoming a professional manga artist. Zastin was initially going to be an enemy, like a CIA agent, but when it was decided to have the running joke of alien fiancé candidates, Lala needed someone at her side. Zastin came in 11th place in the manga's first character popularity poll.

=== Principal ===
Voiced by: Kenichi Ogata (Japanese); John Swasey (English)

The unnamed principal (校長, Kōchō) of Sainan High is well known throughout campus as a huge pervert. He will enroll any girls into the school body so as to ogle and grope them without hesitation as long as they are "cute". This groping is not limited only to Sainan High, but the general public, as well. A common gag involves the Principal spontaneously shedding his clothes and chasing after a girl he becomes smitten with, which inevitably results in him being beaten to a pulp. Once, Run purposefully causes herself to change into Ren to get the principal to leave her be; upon seeing Ren, the principal thinks briefly, then continues to chase him (stating "This is okay too"). Throughout the series, the principal has survived many severe injuries and attacks. Some of these include burning by Kyouko, beaten up, and on one occasion, almost eaten by a crocodile in the Amazon.

The perverted principal character was created because there are a lot of scenes set at school, and Hasemi and Yabuki felt that having one character like him would be fun and allow them to do a lot of naughty and perverted gags. The act of allowing Lala to transfer to Sainan High because she is cute was the source of his entire character.

=== Rin Kujou ===
Voiced by: Mai Hashimoto (Japanese); Chaney Moore (English)

Rin Kujou (九条 凛, Kujō Rin) is Saki's closest friend and bodyguard. She is skilled in the kendo arts and has been the bodyguard of Saki for years, as her family has always served the Tenjouin household in this position. While Rin is usually calm and composed, and perhaps one of the most mature characters in the series, she is also loyal, caring, and protective to Saki, being very dutiful to her job as a bodyguard. These made her conflicted when Saki once ran away from home, and Rin was ordered to bring her back, even by force. But after Saki managed to settle things with her family, she and Rin were able to remain friends. In To Love Ru Darkness, Rin's role is increased as she starts to develop romantic feelings for Rito after he saves her from a cursed sword (with the help of Mea and Yami). Despite being repulsed by Rito herself, Saki is completely supportive of Rin's feelings and actively sets up dates between the two.

Rin's family having served Saki's family for generations was not in the original script for chapter 81. Yabuki added it spontaneously, but Hasemi felt it almost completely fleshed out the relationship between the two. Rin came in 10th place in the manga's first character popularity poll.

=== Ayako Fujisaki ===
Voiced by: Kaori Mizuhashi (Japanese); Olivia Swasey (English)

Ayako Fujisaki (藤崎 綾, Fujisaki Ayako), nicknamed "Aya", is the bespectacled and weak-willed friend of Saki. The two met after Saki and Rin protected her from bullies when they were kids. Aya serves little purpose throughout the series besides following and supporting Saki, whom she idolizes, never been seen without accompanying her or Rin. She is one of the few girls who does not have any romantic feelings towards Rito; most, if not all, of her admiration, goes to Saki, and she naturally hates Rito's perverted accidents, especially if it is towards her, Rin, or Saki.

The flashback of Saki saving a bullied Aya was not in the original script for chapter 81. Yabuki added it spontaneously, but Hasemi felt it almost completely fleshed out the relationship between the two. Aya came in 14th place in the manga's first character popularity poll.

=== Celine ===
Voiced by: Ryoka Yuzuki (Japanese); Kalin Coates (English)

Celine (セリーヌ, Serīnu) is initially introduced as a gigantic, alien, sentient flower from planet Plantas that is given to Rito by Lala for his 16th birthday. Although seemingly monstrous, Rito cares for Celine deeply, keeping her in the Yuuki residence's backyard, and referring to her as his family. The plant has traits in common with humans: perspiring when the climate is humid, wearing a scarf during chilly weather, and eating ramen when hungry (although Celine still needs the basic nutrients of water and sunlight as well). When Celine seemingly contracts a deadly disease, Witherleaf, Rito is fully dedicated to saving her and finding the only known antidote, the Lakfruit. He and his friends journey to the S-level-danger planet of Mistwa to obtain the antidote, only to return and find Celine all dried up. In reality, she was germinating and Celine bursts out from a single seed, taking the appearance of an infant girl, with a flower on her head. This event shocks even Momo, who is very knowledgeable about the galaxy's flora, stating that even with all of her knowledge there is still much about Celine's biological makeup that is a complete mystery to her. Often speaking the nonsense word "mau" (まうー), the infant Celine has a tendency to jump onto women out of nowhere and attempt to breast feed. Celine gets drunk when she drinks cola, at which time she sprays pollen from the flower on her head that temporarily causes anyone who inhales it to fall in love with Rito (a side-effect that originates from Celine's own affection for him from taking care of her every day). In a special chapter of To Love Ru Darkness, Celine takes the form of a grown young woman during a full moon and is able to speak, but returns to her normal infant form upon morning.

When Celine was first introduced, there was no plan whatsoever to make her a recurring character, but eventually the plant became a symbol of the Yuuki house. Hasemi considered having her turn into a human form from early on, but it did not happen until the Mistwa arc due to the ever-increasing number of regular characters. He initially thought to have her be fairy-sized, but Yabuki suggested mascot-sized. In the final volume of To Love Ru, Hasemi and Yabuki mentioned they never got around to having Celine transform into a beautiful girl on the night of the full moon, meet a man, and fall in love in a Princess Kaguya and fairy tale-like style. They eventually featured a similar event in the sequel series, To Love Ru Darkness.

=== Kyouko Kirisaki ===
Voiced by: Chiemi Chiba (Japanese); Monica Rial (English)

Kyouko Kirisaki (霧崎 恭子, Kirisaki Kyōko) is a half-human, half-Flayme (フレイム) girl who is a famous idol. She is best known for her role as "Magical Kyouko", a fictional magical girl character and star of a television series that Lala loves watching. Her half-alien background is keep secret, with her ability to create and throw fire passed off as special effects from the show. Kyouko becomes friends with Run when Run portrays an antagonist on her TV show. Since then, Kyouko and Run have done many projects together, including debuting many songs together. Kyouko knows Run loves Rito and often tries to help her in love. However, after Rito saves her from a mob of boys, Kyouko begins to have feelings for him as well, but suppresses them for her friend's sake. Kyouko is based on the character of the same name from Black Cat. The characters have the same voice actor in their respective anime adaptations.

=== Tearju Lunatique ===
Voiced by: Misato Fukuen (Japanese); Katelyn Barr (English)

Tearju Lunatique (ティアーユ ルナティーク, Tiāyu Runatīku), nicknamed "Tear" (ティア, Tia), is an alien scientist in space biotechnology who created Golden Darkness using some of her own DNA. This being why the two look almost identical, although each has her own distinguishing features. Tearju raised Golden Darkness like a daughter until finding out that Eden, the organization she worked for, wanted to raise her as a weapon. She was almost killed trying to rescue Golden Darkness and had to flee for her life. Her old classmate, Ryouko Mikado, tracks her down and brings Tearju to Earth to reunite with Golden Darkness. Well-endowed and clumsy, she quickly becomes the object of attention of the male students when she becomes a teacher at Sainan High. As with her creation, Tearju is based on a character of the same name from Yabuki's previous series Black Cat.

== Other characters ==
=== Saibai Yuuki ===
Voiced by: Keiji Fujiwara

Saibai Yuuki (結城 才培, Yūki Saibai) is Rito and Mikan's father. He is a prolific manga artist and is very different compared to Rito in terms of both looks and personality. Saibai draws at amazing speeds and can be utterly serious before deadlines are met, but seems to have a bit of a goofy side, such as making a joke about Rito and Lala "sleeping" together every night and punching Rito when he got drunk and mistook his son for a burglar. With the help of Lala, he returns for the Christmas party, stating how much Zastin and his workers have grown since starting out. Saibai was made a manga artist because Hasemi and Yabuki felt it was a good excuse for him to be away from home all the time.

=== Ringo Yuuki ===
Voiced by: Sayaka Ohara

Ringo Yuuki (結城 林檎, Yūki Ringo) is Rito and Mikan's mother. She is a fashion designer and a scout for fashion models. Normally working overseas, she returns home to check up on the family. Despite initially appearing to be refined and chic, Ringo's personality is equally as odd as Saibai's, where she has a tendency to start sizing women up with her hands, whenever she spots pretty girls. Ringo seems to take her work very seriously, having immediately entered "work mode", when she meets Lala and Haruna for the first time. Like her daughter, Ringo is also highly perceptive, and is able to read Haruna's feelings toward Rito. With the help of Lala, she returns for the Christmas party and mistakes Celine for her son's child.

=== Gid Lucion Deviluke ===
Voiced by: Hidetoshi Nakamura (Japanese); David Wald (English)

Gid Lucion Deviluke (ギド・ルシオン・デビルーク, Gido Rushion Debirūku) is the King of Deviluke who rules over the Milky Way galaxy. Gid is the father of Lala, Nana, and Momo. He is the one who ended the galactic war and unified the galaxy. Despite his near-omnipotent power, he initially appears with the physical appearance of an infant, looking slightly devilish, with shark-like teeth, spiky black hair, and the characteristic Devilukean tail. Gid's personality borders juvenile delinquency and perversion, going as far as to use his child-like appearance to get close to pretty girls. The childlike appearance is due to him using too much power during the "Galaxy Unification Wars", which shrunk his body, following his conquest. However, even in this form, he is described to still be very powerful, stating he could destroy the Earth if he wanted. It is speculated that Lala's strength and fighting ability is inherited from her father. In To Love Ru Darkness, Gid is back to his adult form when he fights Nemesis and wins with not much effort. Rito steps in and allows her to live inside his body, despite Gid warning him that she might betray him and start more mischief. The King came in 13th place in the manga's first character popularity poll.

=== Sephie Michaela Deviluke ===
Voiced by: Kikuko Inoue

Sephie Michaela Deviluke (セフィ・ミカエラ・デビルーク, Sefi Mikaera Debirūku) is the Queen of Deviluke and the mother of Lala, Nana, and Momo. After Gid brought peace to the galaxy, she governs and maintains diplomatic peace as her husband is unsuited for the job. Sephie is the last pure-blooded member of the Charmian (チャーム人) race, who have the uncontrollable trait of seducing any male of any race that sees their face, causing them to lose their sanity and pursue them wildly. Even without revealing her face, Sephie can control men just by her voice. The first person not to be affected by her Charm ability was Gid, the second is Rito. It is speculated that Nana and Momo's abilities to communicate with animals and plants respectively was inherited from Sephie's Charmian traits. Momo tries to hide her harem plan from Sephie, as her mother is adamantly anti-harem.

=== Akiho Sairenji ===
Voiced by: Mikako Takahashi

Akiho Sairenji (西連寺 秋穂, Sairenji Akiho) is Haruna's older sister, who shares her apartment with Haruna. Extremely popular with the guys (having received confessions from two men at the same time), Akiho continuously turns them down, as her sister states she is not looking for love at the moment. However, she has been dating Yuu Kotegawa.

=== Yuu Kotegawa ===
Voiced by: Atsushi Abe (Japanese); Mike Haimoto (English)

Yuu Kotegawa (古手川 遊, Kotegawa Yū) is Yui's 19-year-old brother. Yuu is a ladies' man, something Yui dislikes. After finding Rito and Yui being chased by hoodlums, he defends the two from the ruffians, while commenting that he hopes Yui will grow to be more mature. At the moment, he is dating Akiho, Haruna's older sister but unknown to him she isn't taking the relationship as seriously as he does. He also is one of the few people to know that Rito is Riko. Yuu Kotegawa was introduced to be Yui's older brother and to provide an older brother figure that Rito could talk to about love. But Hasemi said the latter never happened, due to poor organization.

=== Taizou Motemitsu ===
Voiced by: Daisuke Namikawa

Taizou Motemitsu (弄光 泰三, Motemitsu Taizō) is an arrogant womanizer of Sainan High, who tries anything to get them to go on a date with him. Greatly admired by his baseball teammates and the male student body, Motemitsu is a closet pervert, having taken shots of girls changing. He was once found out taking photos of girls in the swimming pool, during a swimming class, and was suspended from school for two weeks. He also keeps a personal record of every girl in the school with him. A running gag involves Motemitsu immediately asking out (or, in one case, proposing to) any pretty girl he sees, causing his followers to comment "As expected from Motemitsu-senpai, [whatever Motemitsu has just done]!", only to be instantly rejected, to which his followers say "As expected from Motemitsu-senpai, immediately rejected!".

=== Sachi & Mami ===
Voiced by: Misato Fukuen (Sachie) and Sayuri Yahagi (Mami) (Japanese); Taylor Fono (Mami) (English)

Sachi Kogure (小暮 幸恵, Kogure Sachie) and Mami Nogiwa (乃際 真美, Nogiwa Mami) are two of Mikan's close friends who attend the same school. They like to tease Mikan about her relationship with Rito. They once visit the Yuuki family house and, after Sachi forgets manga there, they return only to see Mikan in an abnormal position with Rito.

=== Lacospo ===
Voiced by: Kappei Yamaguchi

Lacospo (ラコスポ) is the small frog-like prince of the planet Gaama, one of Lala's fiancé candidates, and a recurring antagonist. He is by far the most persistent of Lala's suitors and most recurring to try to win her love. He has a pet Iro-Gaama, a rare species of frog whose mucus dissolves only clothing. Appearing multiple times in the series to steal Lala, he is the one who hired Golden Darkness to assassinate Rito.

=== Kuro ===
Kuro (クロ) is an alien hitman who has killed over 1,000 people and is known as one of the best at the profession, among the likes of Golden Darkness. He uses an ornate, black gun called Hades, built out of orichalcum, for both offense and defense. It can fire various different types of bullets by reading his psychic energy, such as homing bullets and plasma bullets. In To Love Ru Darkness, it is revealed that he was the one who destroyed Eden, the organization that created Golden Darkness and Mea. At that time he let Golden Darkness walk away after seeing himself in her; he was taken in by an organization as a child and molded into an assassin just like her. Kuro is hired by Azenda to kill Rito. He is held at bay by Nemesis (in Rito's body) and Mea, until Golden Darkness arrives and destroys Hades in her "Darkness" form. After seeing that Golden Darkness has changed and chosen a new path in life, Kuro admits defeat and vows to give up the life of a killer. Kuro was created as a guest character to celebrate the third year of serialization, and was based on Train Heartnet from Yabuki's Black Cat.

=== Venus Momo Club ===
The Venus Momo Club (ヴィーナス・モモ・クラブ), or VMC for short, is a fan club at Sainan High devoted to Momo. Led by Nakajima (中島), it was formed by the male students who are in love with Momo in order to prevent fighting. They are extremely overzealous, demanding a male must get their permission to talk to her and vowing to give their lives for her. Although she finds it annoying, especially when she wants to see Rito, Momo refuses to publicly denounce the club.

=== Azenda ===
Voiced by: Risa Hayamizu (Japanese); Christine Auten (English)

Azenda (アゼンダ, Azenda), known as "Azenda the Tyrant" (暴虐のアゼンダ), is an alien assassin. Once famous in her line of work, Azenda's reputation plummeted after being defeated by Golden Darkness. Long seeking revenge, she arrives on Earth after being contacted by Nemesis, who hopes she will reawaken Golden Darkness' killer instincts. Using a whip and psychokinesis, Azenda uses Mikan as a shield, taking advantage of Golden Darkness' friendship with the human until Momo arrives and defeats her. Azenda reappears in the series several times afterword. Admitting she is unable to do it herself, Azenda hires Kuro to kill Rito in order to have revenge on Golden Darkness and Momo.
