= Haruna Sairenji =

Fictional character in the manga series To Love Ru

- To Love Ru character
- Haruna as illustrated by Kentaro Yabuki
- First appearance: Manga: To Love Ru chapter 1: "The Girl Who Fell From the Sky"; Anime: To Love Ru episode 1: "The Girl Who Fell From the Sky"
- Created by: Saki Hasemi; Kentaro Yabuki
- Voiced by: Sayuri Yahagi (Japanese); Bryn Apprill (English, season 1–3); Monica Rial (English, season 4)

In-universe information
- Full name: Haruna Sairenji
- Gender: Female
- Occupation: Student
- Relatives: Fuyuhiko Sairenji (father); Natsumi Sairenji (mother); Akiho Sairenji (older sister)
- Nationality: Japanese

Haruna Sairenji (Note: 西連寺 春菜, Sairenji Haruna) is a fictional character of the manga series To Love Ru, created by Saki Hasemi and Kentaro Yabuki. Haruna is one of the series protagonist Rito Yuki's classmates, as well as the girl of his affections; Haruna has similar feelings for him, having been attracted to his kind, gentle nature since junior high. She is also best friends with Lala Satalin Deviluke, an alien princess from another planet; despite both girls having romantic feelings for Rito, Lala, however, feels no jealousy and instead encourages Haruna to confess to him.

In the anime adaptation, Haruna is voiced by Sayuri Yahagi in Japanese, and by Bryn Apprill and Monica Rial in the English version. Although Haruna is regarded as one of the most popular characters in To Love Ru, she has received mixed critical responses: Haruna's relationship with Rito, as well as her attractiveness, have been praised, while her diminishing role throughout the series has been a point of critic.

== Characterization ==
=== Design ===
Haruna has purple eyes and blue-violet hair, which are always held in place by a vertical red hairpin on the left of her head. She also has very soft skin, which most boys seem to like. According to her friend Mio Sawada, Haruna's measurements are B78, W55, H80. Despite being considered physically attractive for a girl her age, she often feels inferior being surrounded by girls who are far more developed physically than she is.

=== Personality ===
A highly responsible person, Haruna's personality can sway her classmates' hearts to vote for her as their class representative, even when she did not run to be a candidate. Haruna is also a very kind, understanding and patient person, to the point of being polite to everyone around her, especially to the boy she has a crush on, Rito Yuki. Despite his perverted clumsiness, however, she occasionally slaps him out of fear, even though she knows he doesn't do it on purpose, but she forgives him very quickly. In To Love Ru, there is a running gag where Rito is about to confess to her, only for something (or someone) to come between it. Haruna has a severe fear of ghosts and everything related to the supernatural, the exception being Shizu "Oshizu" Murasame, to an extent. When frightened, she has a habit of grabbing the nearest thing around her – typically Rito – and swinging wildly, in an attempt to get rid of whatever frightens her. Haruna is also affiliated with the school's tennis club, in which she is a member alongside her two best friends, Risa Momioka and Mio Sawada, both of which constantly tease Haruna by playfully groping her breasts and whispering naughty things into her ears, her being the duo's most recurrent victim.

== Appearances ==
=== In To Love Ru ===
In the past, when Haruna was 13, her parents moved because her father got a job in another city. However, she and her older sister Akiho stayed behind because they did not want to leave their home in Sainan Town. In eighth grade, Haruna was in the same class as Rito, which has been stated to be the last time that she and Rito were classmates (prior to the start of the series). Once, when the school garden was vandalized, Rito, who was caught on the scene, was presumed guilty. Haruna, knowing how much he cares about his own garden, was the only one who believed in his innocence. Unknown to her, Rito overheard her defense of him and was touched by her belief in him, which was the source of his feelings for her.

At the beginning of To Love Ru, Haruna, while walking to school, meets with Rito, and that's when he tries to confess to her; however, without Rito realizing it, Lala Satalin Deviluke, the first princess of the alien planet Deviluke, shows up in front of him and both she and Haruna misinterpret the confession and end up believing that it was addressed to Lala. After that, she quickly befriended Lala, despite the romantic attraction they both feel for Rito. Despite her growing love for the boy (which she believes to be unrequited), she usually suppresses her feelings and cannot confess to him because of her friendship with Lala. However, with some encouragement and having understood the fact that she cannot continue to hide her feelings, Haruna eventually tells Lala of her ordeal, to which she accepts, claiming Haruna as her rival for Rito's heart, while still remaining friends. Due to the otherworldly circumstances around Rito, Haruna is always put in any and each type of awkward, intimate, and embarrassing situations; this includes her and Rito be teleported naked to the basement of Ryouko Mikado's clinic, or switch bodies with Rito and have to wash her own body. In the last chapter, Rito, after confessing his love for Lala, decides to do it to Haruna too, but Oshizu accidentally rips Haruna's swimsuit, making her run away before she can hear Rito's words, which are incorrectly addressed to four other girls: Yui Kotegawa, Run Elise Jewelria, Nana Astar Deviluke, and Ryouko Mikado.

=== In To Love Ru Darkness ===
In the sequel To Love Ru Darkness, it appears that Rito has yet to properly confess his feelings to Haruna, despite Lala pressuring them to do so, as well as trying to push them together, although Haruna is confused for her reasons in doing so. Lala explains to her that if Rito becomes the next King of Deviluke, Earth's laws on monogamy wouldn't apply to them (as polygamy is a legal practice in space) and thus he could marry both of them. Haruna also seems to have developed the habit of fantasizing about herself and Rito in intimate situations in secret, such as him bathing her or she wearing nothing but an apron to seduce him. During a visit at Haruna's place, Rito accidentally steps on one of Lala's inventions, which causes him and Haruna to shrink down and, amidst trying to hide themselves from her pet dog Maron (マロン), kiss each other (albeit not intentionally) for the first time. Overhearing Rito's denial of Nemesis' harem proclamation as student council president, Haruna defends him from the mob and, while hiding in a gym storage, she finally spoken her love to him, which he returns them; she is the third female character to confess her love to Rito. In the end, as Rito decides not to go forward on this, Haruna accepts and decides to wait for his answer.

=== In other media ===
Haruna appears as one of the heroines of the dating simulator game To Love Ru: Darkness – True Princess, as well as the game To Love Ru: Darkness – Battle Ecstasy for PlayStation Vita. In addition to the To Love Ru series, Haruna also makes cameo appearances in the sixth and eighth chapters of the manga adaptation of the light novel series Mayoi Neko Overrun!.

== Reception ==
=== Popularity ===
Haruna is one of the most popular characters of To Love Ru among fan readers of the series. In the first popularity poll of To Love Ru, Haruna ranked as the 2nd most popular character by 3076 votes. The June 2015 issue of Shueisha's Jump Square magazine included the results of its popularity poll for the heroines of To Love-Ru Darkness. In the various categories presented, Haruna ranked 6th as "which character would you want to be your girlfriend (or wife)?", 7th as "which character would you want to be in your family?" and "which character would you want to be in your family (but not as a wife/girlfriend)?", and 5th as "which character would you want to be your friend?" In the same year, Jump Square presented the results of another popularity poll for the female characters of To Love-Ru Darkness in the October issue; this time Haruna ranked 1st as "which character would you want to be your girlfriend (or wife)?", 7th as "which character would you want to be in your family?" and "which character would you want to be your friend?", 9th as "which character would you want to switch bodies with for just one day?", and 10th as "which character would be your favorite if all the heroines were in an idol group?"

=== Critical response ===
Reviewing the second half of the first season of To Love Ru, Theron Martin, from Anime News Network, praised the development of Haruna's relationship with Rito, emphasizing how they have finally progressed past the "Rito accidentally gropes Haruna" stage, while also complimenting Haruna's attractiveness, describing her as "the ultimate in adorable high school-aged cute". In later reviews for To Love Ru Darkness and Darkness 2nd, Martin points out how Haruna is relegated from the role of main character to a mere supporting status, with her doing little more than cameo appearances in many episodes. In a review for To Love Ru, Anime Club Reviews described Haruna as "the only female character not continuously exploited for fan service or laughs", in addition to saying, "She is our token 'nice girl of the show', and never really strays far from that role. Her problem is basically that she isn't really any more interesting than the other somewhat anonymous girls in the show, despite playing a much larger part -- like, y' know, one of the MAIN CHARACTERS! I'm quite frankly surprised that she has yet to be revealed to be a robot in the manga. She's only there because Rito wants her and because every harem needs more girls attracted to our male lead for any reason, or, in this case, no particular reason."

== See also ==
- List of To Love Ru characters
- Haruna (name)
