= Sayuri Yahagi =

Japanese voice actress

- 矢作 紗友里
- Born: September 22, 1986 (age 40); Tokyo, Japan
- Occupation: Voice actress
- Years active: 2005–present
- Agent: I'm Enterprise
- Notable work: Chibi Vampire as Karin Maaka; To Love Ru as Haruna Sairenji; Seitokai Yakuindomo as Suzu Hagimura; Bakuman as Kaya Miyoshi; Maken-ki! as Kodama Himegami; Saekano as Michiru Hyodo; Dame×Prince Anime Caravan as Ani Inako; Super HxEros as Momoka Momozono

Sayuri Yahagi (矢作 紗友里, Yahagi Sayuri; born September 22, 1986) is a Japanese voice actress. She debuted in 2005 as Karin Maaka, the main protagonist of Chibi Vampire, and has voiced several major characters, including Haruna Sairenji in To Love Ru, Suzu Hagimura in Seitokai Yakuindomo, Kaya Miyoshi in Bakuman, Kodama Himegami in Maken-ki!, Michiru Hyodo in Saekano, Ani Inako in Dame×Prince Anime Caravan, and Momoka Momozono in Super HxEros.

== Biography ==
Yahagi, a native of Tokyo, was born on September 22, 1986. As a child, she was particularly fond of Sailor Moon and would often play pretend games related to the show. She intended to become a mangaka and felt self-conscious about her high-pitched voice, but decided to become a voice actress after learning about the job in junior high. She graduated from the Japan Narration Acting Institute.

In 2005, Yahagi debuted as a voice actress as Karin Maaka, the main protagonist of Chibi Vampire. She voiced Haruna Sairenji in To Love Ru and its sequel To Love Ru Darkness, as well as in some of the franchise's video games; she and Haruka Tomatsu as their characters Haruna and Lala Satalin Deviluke performed "Yatte Koi Daisuki" and "Apple Panic", the opening and ending themes of the 2009 To Love Ru OVAs which were released as a single in March 2009. She also voiced several major characters in other anime, such as Kuu Shiratori in Shattered Angels, Maaya Nanako in Kenkō Zenrakei Suieibu Umishō, Haruka Shiraishi in Chu-Bra!!, Kaya Miyoshi in Bakuman, Elizabeth Warren in Softenni, Kodama Himegami in Maken-ki!, and Suzu Hagimura in Seitokai Yakuindomo.

In 2018, Yahagi voiced Ani Inako, the main protagonist of Dame×Prince Anime Caravan; Rebecca Silverman of Anime News Network remarked that as Ani, Yahagi "balanced things out with her understated performance" in the show. She subsequently starred as Maho Hiyajo in Steins;Gate 0, Amane Katagiri in Senryu Girl, Momoka Momozono in Super HxEros, and Ganryū Sasaki in Shin Ikki Tousen. She and Kana Ueda appeared at a Sony Xperia panel at the Tokyo Game Show 2019.

Yahagi has co-hosted radio shows with other voice actors, including Radio: XBlaze and Sōkai Horoyoi Radio: Bakujū. She is the narrator of Animax.

On January 31, 2015, Yahagi revealed that she was married to an employee of a non-voice acting company. She also has a younger sister.

== Filmography ==
=== Anime series ===
2005

- Chibi Vampire – Karin Maaka

2006

- Fairy Musketeers – Kyupi, Gretel
- Kanon – Shiori's Classmate
- School Rumble: 2nd Semester – Mio Tennōji
- Tokimeki Memorial Only Love – Yuuka Fujikawa
- Buso Renkin – Hanaka Busujima
- Wan Wan Celeb Soreyuke! Tetsunoshin – Audrey

2007

- Venus Versus Virus – Tsukuyo Nogami
- Over Drive – Kaho Asahi
- Kaze no Stigma – Yui
- Kishin Taisen Gigantic Formula – Utsumi "Ucchie" Amano
- Shattered Angels – Kuu Shiratori
- Kenko Zenrakei Suieibu Umisho – Maaya Nanako
- Sola – Chisato Mizuguchi, Grade School Friend
- Gurren Lagann – Girl
- Hayate the Combat Butler – Izumi Segawa
- Potemayo – Eiko Hanabusa

2008

- Ga-Rei-Zero – Mami Izumi
- Kyōran Kazoku Nikki – Kyupi Do
- Hell Girl: Three Vessels – Ririka Katase
- Shugo Chara! – Rima Mashiro
- Shugo Chara!! Doki— – Rima Mashiro
- Sekirei – Mitsuha
- Tytania – Lira Florenz
- To Love Ru – Haruna Sairenji
- Net Ghost PiPoPa – Hikaru Sofue
- Nodame Cantabile: Paris – Puririn
- Pokémon – Aki
- Rosario + Vampire – Waitress
- Rosario + Vampire Capu2 – Tonko Oniyama

2009

- Sweet Blue Flowers – Yoko Hon'atsugi
- Samurai Harem – Sakon Saginomiya
- Asura Cryin' – Ania Fortuna
- Queen's Blade: The Exiled Virgin – Ahtel
- Guin Saga – Suni
- Clannad After Story – Student
- Black Butler – Ran-Mao
- Gokujō!! Mecha Mote Iinchō – Anju Sano
- Shugo Chara! Party! – Rima Mashiro
- Heaven's Lost Property – Eve
- The Girl Who Leapt Through Space – Erika, Satchan
- Cheburashka Arere? – Garlya
- A Certain Scientific Railgun – Akemi
- Nogizaka Haruka no Himitsu: Purezza – Juri Rokujō
- First Love Limited – Nanoka Kyuuma
- Hayate the Combat Butler!! – Izumi Segawa
- Fight Ippatsu! Jūden-chan!! – Iono Tomonaga
- Yatterman – Carmen
- Yumeiro Pâtissière – Miya Koshiro, Marron

2010

- Demon King Daimao – Yukiko
- The Betrayal Knows My Name – Aya Kureha, Miki
- MM! – Noa Hiiragi
- Okami-san and Her Seven Companions – Suzume Shitagiri
- Otome Yōkai Zakuro – Kumiko Agemaki
- Black Butler II – Ran-Mao
- Occult Academy – Bunmei-kun
- Ōkiku Furikabutte ~Natsu no Taikai-hen~ – Asuka Hanai
- Seitokai Yakuindomo – Suzu Hagimura
- Tantei Opera Milky Holmes – Irene Doala
- Chu-Bra!! – Haruka Shiraishi
- Bakuman – Kaya Miyoshi
- Motto To Love Ru – Haruna Sairenji
- Yumeiro Pâtissière SP Professional – Miya Koshiro, Marron

2011

- Croisée in a Foreign Labyrinth - The Animation – Camille
- Kimi to Boku – Hisako Aida
- Sket Dance – Baby, Kawakami, Momo's Voice
- Sacred Seven – Aoi Aiba
- The Qwaser of Stigmata II – Nami Okiura
- Softenni – Elizabeth Warren
- The Mystic Archives of Dantalian – Raziel
- Bakuman 2 – Kaya Miyoshi
- Haganai – Yukiko Nagata
- Maken-Ki! – Kodama Himegami
- Dream Eater Merry – Mistilteinn
- Working!! – Momoka Suzutani

2012

- The Ambition of Oda Nobuna – Akechi Mitsuhide
- Cardfight!! Vanguard: Asia Circuit Hen – Christopher Lo
- Kimi to Boku 2 – Hisako Aida
- Sankarea: Undying Love – Ranko Saōji
- Polar Bear's Café – Penko
- Sword Art Online – Sakuya
- My Little Monster – Yū Miyama
- To Love Ru Darkness – Haruna Sairenji
- Bakuman 3 – Kaya Miyoshi
- Hayate the Combat Butler: Can't Take My Eyes Off You – Izumi Segawa

2013

- Cardfight!! Vanguard: Link Joker Hen – Akari Yotsue, Christopher Lo
- Karneval – Tsubame
- A Town Where You Live – Mina Nagoshi
- Beyond the Boundary – Yui Inami
- Sword Art Online: Extra Edition – Sakuya
- Tamayura - More Aggressive – Harumi Kawai
- Hayate the Combat Butler! Cuties – Izumi Segawa

2014

- M3 the dark metal – Raika Kasumi
- Black Butler: Book of Circus – Ran-Mao
- Brynhildr in the Darkness – Saori
- Silver Spoon – Ayame Minamikujō
- Seitokai Yakuindomo* – Suzu Hagimura
- Tokyo ESP – Mami Izumi
- Maken-Ki! Battling Venus 2 – Kodama Himegami

2015

- Assassination Classroom – Manami Okuda
- Utawarerumono: The False Faces – Honoka
- Go! Princess Precure – Ranko Ichijō
- Saekano – Michiru Hyōdō
- To Love Ru Darkness 2nd – Haruna Sairenji
- Plastic Memories – Zack
- Rampo Kitan: Game of Laplace – Hoshino, Girl Student, Onlookers E

2016

- Assassination Classroom 2nd Season – Manami Okuda
- She and Her Cat - Friend
- Kamisama Minarai: Himitsu no Cocotama – Vivit
- D.Gray-man Hallow – Timothy Hearst
- The Seven Deadly Sins: Signs of Holy War – Pelliot
- Kiss Him, Not Me – Kirari Nanashima
- Keijo – Kei Higuchi

2017

- Saekano: How to Raise a Boring Girlfriend Flat – Michiru Hyōdō
- Urara Meirocho – Mari

2018

- Dame×Prince Anime Caravan – Ani Inako
- Steins;Gate 0 – Maho Hiyajo

2019

- Aikatsu Friends! – Hiro
- Senryu Girl – Amane Katagiri

2020

- Hatena Illusion – Nana's Mother
- Super HxEros – Momoka Momozono
- The Misfit of Demon King Academy – Owl

2021

- Fairy Ranmaru – Shina
- Life Lessons with Uramichi Oniisan – Puppy Sayuri
- The Quintessential Quintuplets ∬ – Shimoda
- To Your Eternity – Chan

2022

- Shin Ikki Tousen – Ganryū Sasaki

2024

- KonoSuba 3 – Claire

=== Anime films ===
- Sword Art Online The Movie: Ordinal Scale (2017) – Sakuya
- Seitokai Yakuindomo: The Movie (2017) – Suzu Hagimura
- Saekano the Movie: Finale (2019) – Michiru Hyodo
- Seitokai Yakuindomo: The Movie 2 (2021) – Suzu Hagimura
- The Quintessential Quintuplets Movie (2022) – Shimoda
- Assassination Classroom the Movie: Our Time (2026) – Manami Okuda

=== Original video animation ===
- Hayate the Combat Butler – Izumi Segawa
- Indian Summer – Ran Midō
- Kemono to Chat – Mito Azuma
- Otogi-Jūshi Akazukin – Gretel
- Seitokai Yakuindomo – Suzu Hagimura
- Seitokai Yakuindomo* — Suzu Hagimura
- Black Butler: Book of Murder – Ran-Mao
- Strike Witches: Operation Victory Arrow, Vol. 3 - Arnhem Bridge - Amelie Planchard
- To Love Ru – Haruna Sairenji
- To Love Ru Darkness — Haruna Sairenji
- Yotsunoha – Arisa Yuki
- Touhou Musou Kakyou: A Summer Day's Dream – Reisen Udongein Inaba

=== Video games ===
- Granblue Fantasy - Ejaeli
- Disgaea 3: Absence of Detention – Rutile
- Suikoden Tierkreis – Manaril
- Tokimeki Memorial 4 – Tsugumi Godo
- Senran Kagura Shinovi Versus – Murasaki
- Senran Kagura: Estival Versus – Murasaki
- Senran Kagura: Peach Beach Splash – Murasaki
- Tears to Tiara II: Heir of the Overlord – Kleito
- Steins;Gate 0 – Maho Hiyajo
- Stella Glow – Nonoka
- Dragon Ball Xenoverse – Time Patroller (Female 2)
- Grand Chase: Dimensional Chaser - Doctor Molly
- God Eater Resonant Ops – Vilma Kühnenfels
- Azur Lane – Kinu
- Arknights – Cutter
- Girls' Frontline - Vigneron M2, A-545
- Kemono Friends - Rock Dove

=== Drama CD ===
- The Idolmaster Neue Green for Dearly Stars – Yumeko Sakurai
- Given – Uenoyama Yayoi

=== Dubbing ===
- Lego DC Comics Super Heroes: Justice League: Gotham City Breakout – Harley Quinn
- Hanazuki: Full of Treasures - Kiazuki
- PAW Patrol - Zuma
- PAW Patrol: The Movie - Zuma
