= Seitokai Yakuindomo =

Japanese manga series

- Manga volume 1 cover, featuring Shino Amakusa

生徒会役員共
- Genre: Comedy, slice of life
- Manga
- Written by: Tozen Ujiie
- Published by: Kodansha
- Magazine: Magazine Special (May 19, 2007–June 20, 2008); Weekly Shōnen Magazine (July 23, 2008–November 17, 2021)
- Original run: May 19, 2007 – November 17, 2021
- Volumes: 22
- Anime television series
- Directed by: Hiromitsu Kanazawa
- Written by: Makoto Nakamura
- Music by: Yūya Mori
- Studio: GoHands
- Licensed by: NA: Sentai Filmworks; UK: MVM Entertainment
- Original network: TV Kanagawa (S1); Tokyo MX (S2)
- Original run: July 4, 2010 – March 29, 2014
- Episodes: 26
- Original video animation
- Directed by: Hiromitsu Kanazawa
- Music by: Yūya Mori
- Studio: GoHands
- Released: April 15, 2011 – October 17, 2013
- Runtime: 25 minutes each
- Episodes: 8
- Original video animation

Seitokai Yakuindomo*
- Directed by: Hiromitsu Kanazawa
- Music by: Yūya Mori
- Studio: GoHands
- Released: May 16, 2014 – September 17, 2020
- Runtime: 25 minutes each
- Episodes: 10
- Anime film

Seitokai Yakuindomo: The Movie
- Directed by: Hiromitsu Kanazawa
- Written by: Hiromitsu Kanazawa
- Music by: Yūya Mori
- Studio: GoHands
- Licensed by: NA: Sentai Filmworks; UK: MVM Entertainment
- Released: July 21, 2017
- Runtime: 60 minutes
- Anime film

Seitokai Yakuindomo: The Movie 2
- Directed by: Hiromitsu Kanazawa
- Written by: Hiromitsu Kanazawa
- Music by: Yūya Mori
- Studio: GoHands
- Licensed by: NA: Sentai Filmworks
- Released: January 1, 2021
- Runtime: 80 minutes
- icon

Seitokai Yakuindomo (Japanese: 生徒会役員共; "Student Council Staff Members") is a Japanese four-panel manga series written and illustrated by Tozen Ujiie. It ran in Kodansha's Magazine Special from May 2007 to June 2008. It was then transferred to Kodansha's Weekly Shōnen Magazine, where it ran from July 2008 to November 2021. Its chapters are collected and published into individual tankōbon volumes, with twenty-two volumes released as of January 2022.

An anime television series adaptation by GoHands aired in Japan between July and September 2010. A second anime season aired between January and March 2014. An anime film premiered in July 2017, and a second anime film was set to premiere in July 2020, but had been delayed to January 2021 due to the COVID-19 pandemic. In North America, the anime series has been licensed by Sentai Filmworks, and in the UK it has been licensed by MVM Entertainment.

== Plot ==
Takatoshi Tsuda attends Ōsai Academy, a high school that, due to declining birth rates, is converted from an all-girl school to a co-ed school (with a male-to-female ratio of 28:524). On his first day, he is forcibly recruited into the student council as the vice-president and sole male representative. The story follows Tsuda and the student council as they interact with each other and their schoolmates.

== Characters ==
=== Main characters ===
Takatoshi Tsuda (津田 タカトシ, Tsuda Takatoshi)
Voiced by: Shintarō Asanuma
Takatoshi is the main character of the story. He chooses to attend a former all-girl school simply because it is close to his home.^{Ch. p1} On his first day at the school, he is forced to be recruited into the student council as the vice president and male representative.^{Ch. p1} He normally acts as the straight-man to Shino and Aria, who, along with other girls in the school, regularly make perverted comments and sexual innuendos. Eventually, he becomes so used to this behaviour that he actually feels odd when they do not make such jokes.
Shino Amakusa (天草 シノ, Amakusa Shino)
Voiced by: Yoko Hikasa
Shino is a second-year student and the student council president.^{Ch. p1} Serious and diligent, she excels in academics and popular among the student body.^{Ch. p2, p3} However, she is normally thinking perverted things. She suggests that one of her original reasons she showed an interest in Takatoshi is so that she could observe him in health and physical education classes.^{Ch. p1} Although she has excellent grades and is skilled in a wide range of subjects, she fears heights^{Ch. p2, p10} and insects,^{Ch. 2} and her rather flat chest makes her feel self-conscious,^{Ch. p10} especially when comparing herself to Aria.^{Ch. p13} She occasionally performs couple-like activities with Takatoshi such as walking with him, sharing an umbrella or clearing his earwax, but is embarrassed whenever Takatoshi says anything that could be interpreted as being romantic (as the series progresses, it is hinted she has feelings for Takatoshi, but she categorically denies this every time she is asked, and there is no romantic development between them during the series). According to her childhood friend Misaki Amano, Shino was student council president at her previous school.^{Ch. 60}
Aria Shichijō (七条 アリア, Shichijō Aria)
Voiced by: Satomi Satō
Aria is the student council secretary and in the same year as Shino;^{Ch. p1} they are good friends.^{Ch. p11} She comes from a wealthy family and is the most physically mature character. However, she has a strongly perverted mind; like Shino, she has a habit of twisting every word and thought into something sexual.^{Ch. p1, p4, p5} Because she is absurdly rich and overly pampered,^{Ch. p5} she can be a social airhead: for instance, she will wait in front of a door and expect it to slide open^{Ch. p10} or stand at the bottom of a staircase expecting it to be an escalator.^{Ch. p7} In contrast, she is academically smart and places second in midterms for her class year, right behind Shino.^{Ch. p4} Her chest is larger than Shino's,^{Ch. p4} which causes the latter to feel self-conscious.^{Ch. p10, p13}
Suzu Hagimura (萩村 スズ, Hagimura Suzu)
Voiced by: Sayuri Yahagi
Suzu is the student council treasurer and in the same year as Takatoshi.^{Ch. p1} She describes herself as a returning student with an IQ of 180, can do 10-digit arithmetic calculations in her head,^{Ch. p1} and is fluent in multiple languages, including English.^{Ch. p1, p6} Even though she is 16 years old at the start of the series, she is no taller than an elementary school student and is very sensitive about her short stature.^{Ch. p1}
Many of the jokes involve her childish appearance or height and she flies into a rage whenever such subjects are mentioned. She normally acts as a secondary tsukkomi at Osai Academy, and she and Tsuda together act as tsukkomi to Shino, Aria, and Nene. Although initially reluctant to accept Takatoshi as a member of the student council, she soon becomes dependent on him, to the point of feeling uneasy when he's not around, and it is hinted on multiple occasions later in the series that she may be developing feelings for him, though, like Shino, there is no romantic development between them during the series. In situations where multiple characters are conversing, often only the top of her head is shown,^{Ch. p14} or a caption and arrow points to where she is.^{Ch. p5, 1}

=== Supporting characters ===
Ranko Hata (畑 ランコ, Hata Ranko)
Voiced by: Satomi Arai
Ranko is the head of the school's newspaper club.^{Ch. p3} She likes to take photos of the student council members to sell around the school, usually without the permission of those being photographed,^{Ch. 1, 7} and she often gets caught. When she conducts an interview, she likes to twist the responses to something dirty or perverted, with Tsuda as a frequent target^{Ch. p3, 1}; running gags in the series have her constantly trying to get Shino and Takatoshi to admit that they are dating, or her admitting to spreading rumors about it, much to their chagrin. She is expressionless most of the time^{[vol. 3]} (but has been shown to smile on very rare occasions)^{[vol. 17]} and has a deadpan monotone voice in the anime, which contrasts with the other girls' excited temperaments.
Mutsumi Mitsuba (三葉 ムツミ, Mitsuba Mutsumi)
Voiced by: Chiaki Omigawa
Mutsumi is Takatoshi's classmate who forms a judo club at the start of the series.^{Ch. p4} She is dedicated to leading her club but is also simple-minded. She develops a crush on Takatoshi later in the series and, despite her remarkable potential and drive regarding martial arts, states that her dream is to simply become a bride. In one instance, she combines his family name Tsuda (津田) with her given name Mutsumi (ムツミ).^{Ch. 151} Because of her innocent nature, she often misses Aria and Shino's innuendos.
Naruko Yokoshima (横島 ナルコ, Yokoshima Naruko)
Voiced by: Yū Kobayashi
Naruko is a teacher at Ōsai Academy and the student council adviser.^{Ch. p5} She is even more perverted than Aria and Shino and angrily seeks out younger guys, not excepting her male students.^{Ch. p5} In the anime, she teaches English and – true to form – her syllabus almost always contains perverted content. She is perceived to be unreliable by the council members and useless as an educator.^{Ch. 4}
Kotomi Tsuda (津田 コトミ, Tsuda Kotomi)
Voiced by: Asami Shimoda
Kotomi is Takatoshi's younger sister,^{Ch. p9} who is in her final year of middle school at the beginning of the series and attends Ōsai the following year.^{Ch. 27} A cheerful girl, she is considerate and caring toward others, but is curious and enthusiastic about sexual matters – something she has in common with the title character in Ujiie's previous work, My Little Sister Is Going Through Puberty.^{Ch. 9} In one episode, when Takatoshi was sick, both she and Shino brought him adult manga. She is close with her brother. However, much to Takatoshi's chagrin, her opinions sometimes imply that they have a false relationship. Kotomi also stated that she is a chūnibyō.^{Ch. 34, 39} She gets along with the other girls perfectly and often asks for and gets help from them. She eventually becomes the manager for the Judo club.
Kaede Igarashi (五十嵐 カエデ, Igarashi Kaede)
Voiced by: Emiri Katō
Kaede is the head of the disciplinary committee at Ōsai Academy.^{Ch. 3} She has a strong sense of justice and morals, but has an androphobia. This ends up being an issue because the school became co-ed after she enrolled.^{Ch. 3} (Note: Igarashi reveals that the reason she is afraid of men is because, several years ago, when she practiced writing the kanji for "male", a classmate asked if she was sexually frustrated.^{Ch. 54}) As the series progresses, Kaede androphobia decreases when she is at ease when around Takatoshi, but not other men.
Sayaka Dejima (出島 サヤカ, Dejima Sayaka)
Voiced by: Mutsumi Tamura
Sayaka is Aria's personal maid.^{Ch. 11} She is over-protective of Aria and bears the key to her chastity belt.^{Ch. 21} Sayaka has a fetish for anything that Aria has touched or worn,^{Ch. 16} as well as unwashed underwear in general.^{Ch. 31}
Nene Todoroki (轟 ネネ, Todoroki Nene)
Voiced by: Hekiru Shiina
Nene is Suzu's friend and a member of the Robot Research Club.^{Ch. 28} She is as perverted as the rest of the girls,^{Ch. 28} as she often wears a vibrator during school hours or is seen working on such devices at her club.^{Ch. 37}
Kaoru Toki (時 カオル, Toki Kaoru)
Voiced by: Miho Hino
Kaoru is Kotomi's first high school friend.^{Ch. 36} Even though Toki looks and sounds like a delinquent, she is actually clumsy and shows no signs of a rebellious nature.^{Ch. 36} The only reason she leaves her shirt loose is because she once accidentally tucked it inside her underwear and was embarrassed about it.^{Ch. 37} She is a little scatterbrained as she tends to get lost and arrive late when meeting up with Kotomi.^{Ch. 64, 84} Her full name is revealed in the credits of the Seitokai Yakuindomo: The Movie.
Chihiro Uomi (魚見 チヒロ, Uomi Chihiro)
Voiced by: Chiwa Saitō
Nicknamed "Womi",^{Ch. 135} ^{Ch. 415} Chihiro the student council president of nearby Eiryou High School. She is introduced when her school visits Ōsai to exchange ideas. Chihiro and Shino discover they are much alike in thought and personality and thus they get along.^{Ch. 113, 114} She and Tsuda become in-laws of a sort when their respective cousins marry; Tsuda is the groom's cousin, Uomi is the bride's. Afterwards, Chihiro insists that Takatoshi call her Onee-chan and she addresses him as Taka-kun. Much to the consternation of some of the other girls, she seems to view Takatoshi as a potential boyfriend, but there is no romantic development between them.
Nozomi Mori (森 ノゾミ, Mori Nozomi) ^{Ch. 300, 415}
Voiced by: Sumire Uesaka
Nozomi is a second year student at Eriyou High School and the vice president of its student council, effectively making her Eriyou's equivalent of Takatoshi.^{Ch. 300} Like Takatoshi and Suzu, she is the straight man on the Eriyou Student Council. She finds her opposite number from Ōsai pleasant to be around, as neither of them have to be the straight man.

=== Crossover characters ===
Characters from Ujiie's previous works have made appearances in Seitokai. Misaki Amano from College Girl Tutor Hamanaka Ai (女子大生家庭教師濱中アイ, Joshidaisei Kateikyoushi Hamanaka Ai) is Shino's ex-vice president in elementary school. Being in the same class as Shino in elementary school they both are of the same age with Amano now also being a high school student, although both of them went to different high schools. Like Takatoshi, she acts as a tsukkomi for Shino's various jokes. The idol unit Triple Booking from Ujiie's work Idol's Red Book (アイドルのあかほん, Aidoru no Aka Hon) also make appearances.

== Media ==
=== Manga ===
Seitokai Yakuindomo is written and illustrated by Tozen Ujiie. The manga was first serialized in Kodansha's Magazine Special from May 19, 2007, to June 20, 2008. The series was then transferred to Kodansha's Weekly Shōnen Magazine, where it ran from July 23, 2008, to November 17, 2021. The first tankōbon volume was released on August 12, 2008, under Kodansha's Shōnen Magazine KC imprint. Its twenty-second and final volume was released on January 17, 2022.

==== Volumes ====
No.	Release date	ISBN
1	August 12, 2008	978-4-06-384030-8
Chapters 1–15 from Magazine Special
Ousai Academy is a school that has recently turned co-ed. On his first day, Takatoshi Tsuda is stopped by student body president Shino Amakusa, who fixes his appearance. He meets secretary Aria Shichijou and treasurer Suzu Hagimura. As he is late for class, Shino decides to give Takatoshi an excuse by making him the student body vice president. Shino shows Takatoshi around campus. Takatoshi looks over the school rules and observes the council's daily experiences. Shino is interviewed by Ranko Hata from the newspaper club. Takatoshi's classmate Mutsumi Mitsuba forms a judo club. They do their midterms. They meet the perverted council advisor Yokoshima. Takatoshi visits Suzu at her house. Shino and Aria return from a class field trip. The council celebrates Shino's birthday. Shino and Takatoshi share an umbrella. Shino visits Takatoshi at home and meets his sister Kotomi. Shino and Aria have swimming class. Hata pursues some ghost stories. The council goes on a beach trip and stay overnight at a nearby inn.
2	May 15, 2009	978-4-06-384142-8
Chapters 16–30 from Weekly Shōnen Magazine
The council prepares for the school's sports day. Hata interviews Shino. A bug flies into the council room. Kaede Igarashi of the Discipline Committee confronts the council on their summer beach trip. Shino helps the judo club with a match. The council prepares a school newsletter. Aria invites the council to her home. As school has a culture festival, the council cleans up their room. She hosts the council at her winter villa, where everyone exchanges exchange Christmas presents before celebrating the New Year's Eve. Kotomi takes the entrance exams for Ousai. The council meets Nene Todoroki of the robotics research club.
3	January 15, 2010	978-4-06-384240-1
Chapters 31–60 from Weekly Shōnen Magazine
Hata visits Aria's estate. Kotomi starts her first year at Ousai. She introduces her friend Toki who looks like a delinquent. The council girls change into summer uniforms and deal with the heat. Kotomi remarks on her reputation of being the sister of the vice president. The council hosts a swimming festival while the girls visit Takatoshi and Kotomi to help clean their house, then stay over. Aria hosts a fireworks party and Shino gives a speech over the PA system. Suzu's dog visits school. The council inspects the different clubs. For career day, the school chooses Aria's maid, Sayak Dejima, to visit the school as well. They pose for art sketches and prepare for another school festival.
4	August 17, 2010	978-4-06-384347-7; 978-4-06-362170-9 (LE)
Chapters 61–90 from Weekly Shōnen Magazine
At the school festival, Shino and Aria's class host a butler café. The council girls participate in the Miss Ousai contest. When Takatoshi is ill, Suzu takes over for the day while Shino tutors Takatoshi. Aria invites the gang to her hot springs. The council goes skiing, talks about self-defense, cleans the environment up, and rides in Dejima's limo. Mutsumi and Nene visit Suzu's home. Takatoshi gets chocolates from the girls on Valentine's Day. The council fields suggestions for cafeteria menu items. Shino and Takatoshi shop for supplies. The council views the cherry blossoms. Jokes that involve tissues. Dejima visits the school and talks about being a maid. Takatoshi's class prepares for exams. The council models school swimsuits.
5	April 15, 2011	978-4-06-384479-5; 978-4-06-358344-1 (LE)
Chapters 91–120 from Weekly Shōnen Magazine
Shino is scouted to become an idol. Kotomi briefly takes over as vice president while Takatoshi is away. The council deals with a stray cat, hosts a send-off for the judo club, and help Hata explore the seven mysteries of Ousai. They stargaze using the Tsuda family's telescope, hang out at the pool, and later have heat endurance and cold endurance contests. Mutsumi recruits Toki to the judo club. The school has an evacuation drill when a real earthquake hits. The council ponders exercising, hosts a lost and found, and work on Halloween activities. They receive a visit from Uomi, the student body president of nearby Eiryou High School, and then visit Eiryou for their cultural festival. They shovel show at school, and later celebrate New Year's Eve at Aria's beach resort.
6	November 17, 2011	978-4-06-384585-3
Chapters 121–150 from Weekly Shōnen Magazine
Igarashi is suspicious that Shino and Takatoshi are alone in the council room. Valentine's Day activities, comments on appearances. Takatoshi bumps into Uomi when shopping for White Day presents. Shino makes a lunch for Takatoshi. The council plans club inspections but is concerned about leaks. The council members study at the library and later tutor Takatoshi. Hata has the judo club model for some posters. Aria tries palm-reading. The council cheers on Ousai's teams at the athletics festival. The council remarks on some words, and deal with some flowers. Another beach party followed by a test courage, and a local festival. The council members work as lifeguards for the school pool. Shino calls Suzu, Aria, and Takatoshi individually to have night conversations.
7	July 17, 2012	978-4-06-384710-9
Chapters 151–180 from Weekly Shōnen Magazine
The council poses for a school uniform photo shoot, and later helps Hata with articles for the school newspaper. Suzu feels sick and rests in the school infirmary. Some jokes about Aria's chest as well as appearances. Oumi visits the school as it hosts a marathon competition. The council has nabe at Takatoshi's house. At night, Shino dresses as Santa and gives everyone presents. Yokohama joins the council members for a king game. Takatoshi and Kotomi attend a wedding and discover that they will be cousins-in-law with Uomi. Takatoshi and Shino get their arms stuck in the school gate. Aria invites her friends to pick foods in the wild. The council members test out attractions at Aria's amusement park.
8	February 15, 2013	978-4-06-384817-5
Chapters 181–211 from Weekly Shōnen Magazine
Uomi and Shino visit and stay over at the Tsuda house. More below-the-waist jokes. Aria coaches the first-years in tennis. The school has swimming lessons with clothes on. The council members visit a burger joint, and later do karaoke. To practice saving energy, Aria has the council members camp at her family's private island. Uomi visits the Tsuda family during summer vacation. The judo club holds practice using Aria's love doll as a dummy partner. The council members make ice cream at the Tsuda house. Shino has Takatoshi clean the school bathrooms.
9	October 17, 2013	978-4-06-358443-1
Chapters 212–242 from Weekly Shōnen Magazine
10	May 16, 2014	978-4-06-395093-9; 978-4-06-358483-7 (LE)
Chapters 243–270 from Weekly Shōnen Magazine
11	February 17, 2015	978-4-06-395324-4; 978-4-06-358711-1 (LE)
Chapters 271–301 from Weekly Shōnen Magazine
12	September 17, 2015	978-4-06-395485-2; 978-4-06-358766-1 (LE)
Chapters 302–332 from Weekly Shōnen Magazine
13	April 15, 2016	978-4-06-395648-1; 978-4-06-358792-0 (LE)
Chapters 333–363 from Weekly Shōnen Magazine
14	December 16, 2016	978-4-06-395826-3; 978-4-06-358793-7 (LE)
Chapters 364–394 from Weekly Shōnen Magazine
15	September 15, 2017	978-4-06-510186-5; 978-4-06-397025-8 (LE)
Chapters 395–425 from Weekly Shōnen Magazine
16	March 16, 2018	978-4-06-511062-1; 978-4-06-397031-9 (LE)
Chapters 426–456 from Weekly Shōnen Magazine
17	April 17, 2019	978-4-06-514882-2; 978-4-06-511560-2 (LE)
Chapters 457–487 from Weekly Shōnen Magazine
18	August 16, 2019	978-4-06-516230-9; 978-4-06-511559-6 (LE)
Chapters 488–518 from Weekly Shōnen Magazine
19	September 17, 2020	978-4-06-520596-9; 978-4-06-517553-8 (LE)
Chapters 519–550 from Weekly Shōnen Magazine
20	March 17, 2021	978-4-06-522218-8; 978-4-06-522099-3 (LE)
Chapters 551–581 from Weekly Shōnen Magazine
21	August 17, 2021	978-4-06-524484-5; 978-4-06-523604-8 (LE)
Chapters 582–611 from Weekly Shōnen Magazine
22	January 17, 2022	978-4-06-526597-0
Chapters 612–641.5 from Weekly Shōnen Magazine

=== Anime ===
A 13-episode anime television series produced by GoHands and directed by Hiromitsu Kanazawa aired in Japan from July 4 to September 26, 2010, on TV Kanagawa. (Note: TVK used an after midnight programming schedule, so the first broadcast was listed for July 3, 2010, at 24:30, which is the same as July 4 at 12:30 am.) The anime began airing at later dates on Chiba TV, TV Saitama, Sun TV, KBS, Tokyo MX, TV Aichi, and AT-X. Two pieces of theme music are used for the anime: one opening theme and one ending theme. The opening theme is "Yamato Nadeshiko Education" (大和撫子エデュケイション, Yamato Nadeshiko Edukeishon) by Triple Booking, which is a group of characters from the author's previous work Idol no Akahon consisting of Yōko Hikasa, Satomi Satō and Sayuri Yahagi – the voices of Shino, Aria and Suzu. The ending theme is "Aoi Haru" (蒼い春; Blue Spring) by Angela. Six Blu-ray/DVD volumes were released between August 4 and October 27, 2010.

A 13-episode second season titled Seitokai Yakuindomo* (生徒会役員共*) aired from January 4 to March 29, 2014. It was simulcast with English subtitles by Crunchyroll. An anime film was released on July 21, 2017. Both seasons and the film have been licensed in the US by Sentai Filmworks and in the UK by MVM Entertainment, and released on Blu-ray on December 10, 2019, and October 18, 2021, respectively. A second anime film was set to be released on July 10, 2020, but was delayed to January 1, 2021, due to the COVID-19 pandemic. The staff and cast returned to reprise their roles in both films. The second movie was released on Blu-ray by Sentai Filmworks on September 20, 2022.

Original video animation (OVA) episodes of the anime have been shipping with the limited editions of the manga volumes, beginning with the fifth volume released on April 15, 2011, and excluding the sixteenth, twenty-first and twenty-second volumes. The OVAs were released with limited edition bundles of the manga and also as standalone videos. They were also produced by GoHands and their episodes are numbered as if they continued the TV series. The sixteenth volume instead bundled the first movie. The twenty-first volume bundled the second movie.

An Internet radio show titled Anime 'Seitokai Yakuindomo' ga Zenbu Wakaru Radio, Ryakushite Zenra! (アニメ『生徒会役員共』が全部わかるラジオ、略して全ラ！) produced by Animate TV began streaming online on July 14, 2010, to support the TV series. The show does not have any fixed hosts, but members of the voice cast take turns hosting the show every week.

== Works cited ==
- "Ch." is shortened form for chapter and refers to a chapter number of the Seitokai Yakuindomo manga by Tozen Ujiie. Original Japanese version published by Kodansha. "Ch. p" references to chapters published in Magazine Special, while those without the "p" refer to chapters published in Weekly Shonen Magazine.
