= Sakigake no Hana Miko =

Japanese manga series

- First tankōbon volume cover

魁の花巫女
- Manga
- Written by: Ryōma Kitada
- Published by: Kodansha
- Imprint: Shōnen Magazine Comics
- Magazine: Magazine Pocket
- Original run: July 22, 2024 – April 6, 2026
- Volumes: 8

Sakigake no Hana Miko (魁の花巫女; lit. 'Leader of the Flower Shrine Maidens') is a Japanese manga series written and illustrated by Ryōma Kitada. It was serialized on Kodansha's Magazine Pocket service from July 2024 to April 2026, and was compiled into eight volumes.

== Plot ==
Arata Kamishiro, a part-time high school teacher, learns that his father has died. Returning home after years away, he reunites with his step-niece Hina, who had grown distant from him from years of separation. After encountering a sword left behind by his father, a monster-like being attacks the shrine. Hana appears to fight the being, revealing herself to be a Hanamiko (花巫女), a woman tasked with defeating evil spirits known as Gods of Calamity (禍神, Magatsukami). After the attack, he wakes up at the Night District Castle, where he learns that he is now tasked with recruiting and taking care of the Hanamiko.

== Characters ==
Arata Kamishiro (神代 新, Arata Kamishiro)
A high school teacher who left his family five years prior to the start of the story to move to Tokyo. His parents are divorced, with him being unaware of his mother's whereabouts. His older stepbrother Susumu and his wife were killed in an attack, which led Arata to abandon the shrine, not wanting to take up the responsibility of inheriting it. He is nicknamed "Buddha Kamishiro" at school. He returns home, knowing that he is now next in line to run the shrine. After the God of Calamity's attack, he wakes up at the Night District Castle. He vows to be the new keeper of the shrine and promises not to abandon Hina.
Hina Kamishiro (神代 雛, Kamishiro Hina)
Arata's niece, who works as a shrine maiden. She is the daughter of Arata's stepbrother; despite not being blood-related, she was attached to him when she was younger. Arata is her only remaining relative following her parents' and grandfather's deaths. She is also known as Hinagiku (雛菊).
Inazuma (稲妻)
A Hanamiko who works at the Night District Castle. She has a tanned appearance and wears earrings.
Gekka (月下)
A Hanamiko who works at the Night District Castle. She has light hair and wears a hairclip.
Harutsubaki (春椿)
A Hanamiko who works at the Night District Castle. She has short hair and wears flowers on her hair.
Nazuna (薺)
A Hanamiko who works at the Night District Castle. She has a mature appearance.

== Development ==
Ryōma Kitada originally developed the idea for the series while working on his previous series Yumeochi: Dreaming of Falling for You. He originally pitched a draft version to Shueisha, which declined the proposal. With their permission, he decided to pitch it to Kodansha instead, which agreed to serialize it. He originally envisioned a fantasy series set in a city inspired by the Edo period, but decided to switch to a modern-day setting as he felt the premise had become too fantastical.

The series was originally intended to have a female protagonist, but Kitada changed it to have a male protagonist to make it more relatable to readers. He cited works such as Spirited Away and other Studio Ghibli films as inspirations. Due to his lack of experience writing a Japanese-style fantasy, he did research on the Edo period, including red-light districts of the time and the language used there. He made sure to include archaic language to fit the series' themes. To make the series more distinctive, he decided to include kanji onomatopoeia.

== Publication ==
The series is written and illustrated by Ryōma Kitada, who had previously serialized the manga series Super HxEros in Shueisha's Jump Square magazine, and Yumeochi: Dreaming of Falling for You in Shueisha's online service Shōnen Jump+. It was serialized on Kodansha's Magazine Pocket service from July 22, 2024, to April 6, 2026. The first tankōbon volume was released on October 8, 2024, with a Kodansha representative stating that a reprint was decided on a week after release. Eight volumes were released from October 8, 2024, to June 9, 2026.

| No. | Release date | ISBN |
|---|---|---|
| 1 | October 8, 2024 | 978-4-06-537191-6 |
| 2 | January 8, 2025 | 978-4-06-538052-9 |
| 3 | April 9, 2025 | 978-4-06-539046-7 |
| 4 | June 9, 2025 | 978-4-06-539751-0 |
| 5 | September 9, 2025 | 978-4-06-540657-1 |
| 6 | December 9, 2025 | 978-4-06-541890-1 |
| 7 | April 9, 2026 | 978-4-06-542587-9 |
| 8 | June 9, 2026 | 978-4-06-543894-7 |

== See also ==
- Super HxEros, another manga series by the same author
