= Super HxEros =

Japanese manga series

- First tankōbon volume cover, featuring Kirara Hoshino

ド級編隊エグゼロス (Dokyū Hentai Eguzerosu)
- Genre: Comedy; Harem; Superhero
- Manga
- Written by: Ryōma Kitada
- Published by: Shueisha
- English publisher: NA: Seven Seas Entertainment
- Imprint: Jump Comics SQ.
- Magazine: Jump Square
- Original run: May 2, 2017 – February 4, 2021
- Volumes: 12
- Anime television series
- Directed by: Masato Jinbo
- Produced by: Manabu Jinguuji; Mayumi Kurashima
- Written by: Masato Jinbo
- Music by: Gin
- Studio: Project No.9
- Licensed by: Aniplex of America
- Original network: Tokyo MX, BS11, MBS, AT-X, TV Aichi
- Original run: July 4, 2020 – September 26, 2020
- Episodes: 12 + 2 OVAs
- icon

Super HxEros (Japanese: ド級編隊エグゼロス, Hepburn: Dokyū Hentai Eguzerosu; lit. "Dreadnought Formation HxEros") is a Japanese manga series written and illustrated by Ryōma Kitada. It was serialized in Shueisha's Jump Square magazine from May 2017 to February 2021, with its chapters collected into twelve tankōbon volumes. In North America, the manga is licensed by Seven Seas Entertainment. A 12-episode anime television series adaptation produced by Project No.9 aired from July to September 2020.

== Premise ==
An unknown type of alien called the "Kiseichuu" (キセイ蟲, Kiseichū) invades Earth. They plunder "H-Energy" in an attempt to make mankind extinct. To save the Earth from the alien threat, high school boy Retto Enjo joins the "HxEros" team, partnering with four beautiful high school girls, one of whom is his childhood friend Kirara Hoshino. However, it turns out that Kirara's personality has drastically changed, which leads to an estrangement between the two childhood friends.

== Characters ==
=== Main ===
Retto Enjo (炎城 烈人, Enjō Retto)
Voiced by: Yoshitsugu Matsuoka (Japanese); Matt Shipman (English)
A second year high school student who lives in Saitama. He joined HxEros at the recommendation of his uncle after his childhood friend, Kirara Hoshino, was attacked by a Kiseichuu when they were children. Despite the rift between them following the Kiseichuu attack, he continues to have feelings for her. At the end of the series, he confesses to Kirara and they become a couple.
Kirara Hoshino (星乃 雲母, Hoshino Kirara)
Voiced by: Ai Kakuma (Japanese); Brittany Lauda (English)
Kirara is Retto's childhood friend. Once having an outgoing personality when she was younger, Kirara changed after she was attacked by a Kiseichuu, to the point she avoids boys in general. Despite that, she retains feelings for Retto.
Momoka Momozono (桃園 百花, Momozono Momoka)
Voiced by: Sayuri Yahagi (Japanese); Emily Neves (English)
An energetic and athletic girl, Momoka joined HxEros thanks to her rivalry with her older sister, Sonoka, who is a model. It is hinted that she has feelings for Retto.
Sora Tenkuji (天空寺 宙, Tenkūji Sora)
Voiced by: Yūki Kuwahara (Japanese); Mallorie Rodak (English)
Sora is the youngest member of HxEros who occasionally wanders into Retto's bed when she is half asleep. She likes to draw erotic manga. She is a classmate of Retto's younger sister, Hiiro.
Maihime Shirayuki (白雪 舞姫, Shirayuki Maihime)
Voiced by: Ai Kayano (Japanese); Kate Bristol (English)
Maihime is a friendly girl who believes she does not have any special abilities. Unbeknownst to her, however, her H-Energy is a lot stronger than she thinks. She goes to an all-girls school.

=== Supporting ===
Jou Anno (庵野 丈, Anno Jō)
Voiced by: Shin-ichiro Miki (Japanese); Daman Mills (English)
Retto's uncle, Jou works for the Earth Defense Force Saitama Branch as the Chief of the Hero Section.
Chacha (チャチャ)
Voiced by: Nichika Ōmori (Japanese); Suzie Yeung (English)
A Kiseichuu who is the oldest child of the queen. Unlike other members of her species, Chacha is able to release pheromones that make it easier for others to feel H-Energy. As such, she is despised and imprisoned by her species.
Runba (ルンバ)
Voiced by: Daisuke Kishio (Japanese); Christopher Guerrero (English)
A puppy who lives at Retto's house.
Shiko Murasame (叢雨 紫子, Murasame Shiko)
Voiced by: Lynn (Japanese); Michelle Rojas (English)
A member of HxEros who works for the Tokyo Branch. Thanks to her XERO gear, she has a very insensitive body. She developed a crush on Retto after he helped her release her H-Energy while he was in beast mode.
Moena Wakakusa (若草 萌萎, Wakakusa Moena)
Voiced by: Natsumi Takamori (Japanese); Kristen McGuire (English)
A member of HxEros who works for the Tokyo Branch. She went to the same middle school as Momoka.
Touma Taiga (大河 橙馬, Taiga Tōma)
Voiced by: Ayaka Ōhashi (Japanese); Clifford Chapin (English)
A member of HxEros who works for the Tokyo Branch. A fan of Retto, he has an effeminate appearance.
Yona Ichougi (銀杏木 よな, Ichōgi Yona)
Voiced by: Yūki Takada (Japanese); Katelyn Barr (English)
A member of HxEros who works for the Tokyo Branch. She comes across as being mature.
Hiiro Enjo (炎城 緋色, Enjō Hiiro)
Voiced by: Emiri Suyama^{Ep. 11 credits}
Retto's younger sister. She is a classmate of Sora.
Narrator (ナレーション, Narēshon)
Voiced by: Rikiya Koyama (Japanese); Christopher Guerrero (English)

== Media ==
=== Manga ===
Written and illustrated by Ryōma Kitada, Super HxEros was serialized in Shueisha's Jump Square magazine from May 2, 2017, to February 4, 2021. Kitada announced that the series will continue in some form in the future. Shueisha collected its chapters in twelve individual tankōbon volumes, which were released from September 4, 2017, to March 4, 2021. In North America, the manga is licensed by Seven Seas Entertainment.

==== Volumes ====
No.	Original release date	Original ISBN	English release date	English ISBN
1	September 4, 2017	978-4-08-881247-2	March 9, 2021	978-1-64827-548-7
1. "A World of Blinding Light" (光満ちるこのセカイで, Hikari Michiru Kono Sekai de); 2. "HxEros, At Your Service!" (結成、エグゼロス, Kessei, Eguzerosu) (Note: This chapter is stylized as "HXEROS, At Your Service!".); 3. "Momoka Momozono, the Pinkest Flower" (桃の園、百の花, Momozono, Hyaku no Hana); 4. "The Butterfly Effect" (バタフライ・エフェクト, Batafurai Efekuto)
2	December 4, 2017	978-4-08-881296-0	May 4, 2021	978-1-64827-549-4
5. "The Night is Short! Follow Your Heart, Girl!" (夜は短し惚気よ乙女, Yoru wa Mijikashi Noroke yo Otome); 6. "Snow White of Kiotome Academy" (早乙女女学院の白雪姫, Saotome Jogakuin no Shirayukihime); 7. "The Colors of Heaven: Sora and Hoshino" (空の色、星の色, Sora no Iro, Hoshi no Iro); 8. "HxEros Rising" (エグゼロス・ライジング, Eguzerosu Raijingu) (Note: Stylized in all caps); 9. "A New Roommate?" (新たな同居人（？）, Aratana Dōkyo Hito (?))
3	March 2, 2018	978-4-08-881366-0	July 6, 2021	978-1-64827-550-0
10. "A Clothes Encounter" (夜しふくのひととき, Shifuku no Hitotoki); 11. "The Xero Suit" (XEROスーツ, Xero Sūtsu) (Note: This chapter is stylized as "The XERO Suit".); 12. "A Day in the Life of Sora Tenkuji" (H EROINE 天空寺 宙の日常, Hiroin: Tenkūji Sora no Nichijō); 13. "Back to the Past" (パトス イン ザ パスト, Patosu in za Pasuto); 14. "I Dream of Hoshino" (ホシノ見ル夢, Hoshino Miru Yume); Bonus Short Story: "Dear Hannibal" (拝啓、ハンニバル, Haikei, Hannibaru)
4	July 4, 2018	978-4-08-881519-0	October 5, 2021	978-1-64827-551-7
15. "Xero Game" (XEROゲーム, Xero Gēmu) (Note: This chapter is stylized as "XERO Game".); 16. "Biotite"; 17. "HxEros: Assemble at the Onsen!" (銭湯！ エグゼロス, Sentō! Eguzerosu) (Note: This chapter is stylized as "HXEROS: Assemble at the Onsen!".); 18. "Xero Suit Mark II" (XEROスーツ・改, Xero Sūtsu Aratame) (Note: This chapter is stylized as "XERO Suit Mark II".); Bonus: "Weekly Young Jump Special Teaser" (週刊ヤングジャンプ出張番外編, Shūkan Yangu Janpu Shutchō Bangai-hen) (Note: This is erroneously referred to as chapter 19 in the English volume release.)
5	November 2, 2018	978-4-08-881631-9	February 8, 2022	978-1-64827-577-7
19. "Monster ☆ H-Energy" (Hナジー☆モンスター, H Najī ☆ Monsutā); 20. "Two Tricksters" (二人のアマノジャク, Futari no Amanojaku); 21. "High Times on Noodie Beach" (肌金海岸海開き, Hada-kin Kaigan Umi Hiraki); 22. "Saitama × Tokyo" (サイタマ✕トーキョー, Saitama × Tōkyō); 23. "Two Kiraras" (二人の雲母, Futari no Kirara); 24. "The Hero Instrumentality Project" (人類総HERO計画, Jinrui Sō Hīrō Keikaku); Bonus: "Shonen Jump Plus Extra Chapter" (少年ジャンプ+特別番外編, Shōnen Janpu Purasu Tokubetsu Bangai-hen)
6	March 4, 2019	978-4-08-881774-3	March 22, 2022	978-1-63858-173-4
25. "The ??? Before the Storm" (嵐の前の..., Arashi no Mae no...); 26. "Goodbye, HxEros" (バイバイ、エグゼロス。, Baibai, Eguzerosu) (Note: This chapter is stylized as "Goodbye, HXEROS".); 27. "Chacha's Determination" (決意のチャチャ, Ketsui no Chacha); 28. "The HxEros' Final Battle!" (決戦！エグゼロス, Kessen! Eguzerosu) (Note: This chapter is stylized as "The HXEROS' Final Battle!".)
7	September 4, 2019	978-4-08-881247-2	May 10, 2022	978-1-63858-251-9
29. "HxEros in Black" (漆黒のエグゼロス, Shikkoku no Eguzerosu) (Note: This chapter is stylized as "HXEROS in Black".); 30. "Unlucky Pervert" (不幸中の最猥, Fukōchū no Saiwai); 31. "Sora's Energen" (宙のエネルゲン, Sora no Enerugen); 32. "Middle School Breasties" (オナ中の真実, Onachū no Shinjitsu); 33. "Shou's Secret" (曙のかくしごと, Shō no Kakushigoto)
8	November 1, 2019	978-4-08-882112-2; 978-4-08-882156-6 (SE)	July 12, 2022	978-1-63858-348-6
34. "Naked Heavens" (天地無装, Tenchi mu Sō); 35. "Training Bears Fruit" (修行のセイカ, Shugyō no Seika); 36. "HxEros vs. Guardian" (VSヌシ, Bāsasu Nushi) (Note: This chapter is stylized as "HXEROS VS. Guardian".); 37. "Gossip Girls" (乙女三人寄れば姦しい, Otome Sannin Yoreba Kashimashī)
9	March 4, 2020	978-4-08-882234-1	December 6, 2022	978-1-63858-682-1
38. "HxEros vs. Kyou" (VS暁, Bāsasu Kyō) (Note: This chapter is stylized as "HXEROS vs. Kyou".); 39. "Shou and Kyou" (曙と暁, Shō to Kyō); 40. "Sisterly Memories" (二人の記憶, Futari no Kioku); 41. "HxEros vs. Kyoseichuu" (VSキョセイ蟲, Bāsasu Kyoseichū) (Note: This chapter is stylized as "HXEROS vs. Kyou".)
10	July 3, 2020	978-4-08-882358-4	April 25, 2023	978-1-63858-804-7
42. "Attack of the Bed Monster" (アタック・オブ・ザ・ベッドモンスター, Atakku obu za Beddo Monsutā); 43. "Shiko and Retto" (シコとレット, Shiko to Retto); 44. "Phenylethylamine" (Note: "PEA" in the Japanese version.); 45. "The Walking Date" (ウォーキング・デート, Uōkingu Dēto); 46. "The Passion of Maihime Shirayuki" (白雪舞姫の受難, Shirayuki Maihime no Junan); 47. "Kisei Virus" (キセイ・ウイルス, Kisei Uirusu); Bonus: "Monthly Shonen Magazine Bonus Chapter" (月刊少年マガジン出張番外編, Gekkan Shōnen Magajin Shutchō Bangai-hen)
11	November 4, 2020	978-4-08-882480-2; 978-4-08-908393-2 (SE)	July 25, 2023	978-1-63858-907-5
48. "The Kisei Princess" (登場、キセイ姫, Tōjō, Kisei Hime); 49. "Tokyo Training Camp" (トーキョー合宿, Tōkyō Gasshuku); 50. "HxEros vs. the Tokyo Director" (VS支部長, Bāsasu Shibuchō) (Note: This chapter is stylized as "HXEROS vs. the Tokyo Director".); 51. "A Rose by Momozono's Name" (園の花、百の花, Momozono, Hyaku no Hana); Bonus: "Weekly Shonen Jump Special Chapter" (週刊少年ジャンプ出張番外編, Shūkan Shōnen Janpu Shutchō Bangai-hen); Bonus: "Special Bonus Chapter" (特別番外編, Tokubetsu bangai-hen)
12	March 4, 2021	978-4-08-882588-5; 978-4-08-908394-9 (SE)	October 31, 2023	978-1-63858-989-1
52. "The Real Kirara" (本当の雲母, Hontō no Kirara); 53. "Kirara vs. Dark Kirara" (雲母VS黒雲母, Kirara Bāsasu Kuro Kirara); 54. "Awakening" (覚醒, Kakusei); 55. "HxEros Forever" (エグゼロスよ、永遠に。, Eguzerosu yo, Eien ni)

=== Anime ===
An anime television series adaptation was announced on October 25, 2019. The series was animated by Project No.9, written and directed by Masato Jinbo, with Akitomo Yamamoto designing the characters, and Gin from music group Busted Rose composing the music. It aired from July 4 to September 26, 2020, on Tokyo MX and other channels. (Note: Tokyo MX listed the series premiere at 24:00 on July 3, 2020, which is at midnight on July 4.) The opening theme, "Wake Up Hx ERO!", was performed by the rock band Burnout Syndromes, performing as HxEros Syndromes, featuring Yoshitsugu Matsuoka performing as his character, Retto Enjo. The ending theme, "Lost emotion", was performed by Ai Kakuma as her character, Kirara Hoshino. The series ran for 12 episodes. An OVA is bundled with the manga's eleventh volume, which was released on November 4, 2020. Another OVA is bundled with the manga's twelfth and final volume, which was released on March 4, 2021.

The series is licensed by Aniplex of America. Funimation streamed the censored broadcast version on its platform. On September 4, 2020, Funimation announced that the series would receive an English dub, which premiered on the same day. Following Sony's acquisition of Crunchyroll, the series was moved to Crunchyroll.

==== Episodes ====
No.	Title (Note: All English titles are taken from Funimation.)	Original release date
1	"In This World Filled With Light"; Transliteration: "Hikari Michiru Kono Sekai de" (Japanese: 光満ちるこのセカイで)	July 4, 2020
2	"HxEros Forms"; Transliteration: "Kessei, Eguzerosu" (Japanese: 結成、エグゼロス)	July 11, 2020
3	"Butterfly Effect"; Transliteration: "Batafurai Efekuto" (Japanese: バタフライエフェクト)	July 18, 2020
4	"Snow White and the Color of the Sky"; Transliteration: "Shirayukihime to Chū no Iro" (Japanese: 白雪姫と宙の色)	July 25, 2020
5	"HxEros Rising"; Transliteration: "Eguzerosu Raijingu" (Japanese: エグゼロス・ライジング)	August 1, 2020
6	"New Roommate (?)"; Transliteration: "Aratana Dōkyo Hito (?)" (Japanese: 新たな同居人（？）)	August 8, 2020
7	"XERO Game"; Transliteration: "XERO Gēmu" (Japanese: XEROゲーム)	August 15, 2020
7.5	"HxEros Report"; Transliteration: "Eguzerosu Repōto" (Japanese: エグゼロス・レポート)	August 22, 2020
8	"H-energy Monster"; Transliteration: "H Najī ☆ Monsutā" (Japanese: Hナジー☆モンスター)	August 29, 2020
9	"Hadakana Beach Season Opening"; Transliteration: "Hada-kin Kaigan Umi Hiraki" (Japanese: 肌金海岸海開き)	September 5, 2020
10	"The Two Kiraras"; Transliteration: "Futari no Kirara" (Japanese: 二人の雲母)	September 12, 2020
11	"Bye-bye, HxEros!"; Transliteration: "Baibai, Eguzerosu" (Japanese: バイバイ、 エグゼロス)	September 19, 2020
12	"HxEros Showdown!"; Transliteration: "Kessen! Eguzerosu" (Japanese: 決戦！ エグゼロス)	September 26, 2020

==== OVAs ====
No.	Title	Original release date
1	"The Two Contraries"; Transliteration: "Futari no Amanojaku" (Japanese: 二人のアマノジャク)	November 4, 2020
1	"Sora Tenkuji's Daily Routine"; Transliteration: "Tenkūji Sora no Nichijō" (Japanese: 天空寺宙の日常)	November 4, 2020
1	"Humanity's Total Hero Plan"; Transliteration: "Jinrui sō Hīrō Keikaku" (Japanese: 人類総HERO計画)	November 4, 2020
2	"The XERO Hero Suit"; Transliteration: "XERO Sūtsu Aratame" (Japanese: XEROスーツ・改)	March 4, 2021

== Reception ==
By October 2019, the manga had 900,000 copies in circulation. Nicholas Dupree of Anime News Network called the series a "good-vs-evil superpowered girls show," while fellow reviewer, Monique Thomas called it a "horny Super Sentai parody show." Dupree also praised the series for being more in-depth than what they expected, but Thomas criticized it for, at times, its "sex positive fanservice" falling flat. Both reviewers pointed out that Maihime has a "lesbian prince girlfriend," noting it is not the only lesbian relationship in the series, as one of Kirara's friends, not part of the Super HxEros, is "dating an older girl."

== See also ==
- Sakigake no Hana Miko, another manga series by the same author
