= Dame×Prince =

Japanese visual novel

- Genre: Comedy; Reverse harem
- Video game
- Developer: NHN PlayArt
- Publisher: NHN PlayArt
- Platform: Android, iOS
- Released: JP: March 31, 2016
- Manga
- Written by: Studio FKDC; Umi Aoi
- Illustrated by: Studio FKDC; Shou Soumata
- Published by: Comico
- Magazine: Comico Japan
- Original run: October 23, 2018 – December 14, 2018
- Anime television series

Dame×Prince Anime Caravan
- Directed by: Makoto Hoshino
- Written by: Naruo Kobayashi
- Studio: Studio Flad
- Licensed by: NA: Sentai Filmworks
- Original network: Tokyo MX; BS Fuji
- Original run: January 10, 2018 – March 28, 2018
- Episodes: 12
- Manga

Dame×Prince ~Shinryaku! Dame Ouji~
- Written by: Chidori
- Published by: Comic S
- Original run: January 6, 2017 – January 9, 2018

Dame×Prince, also known as DamePri (ダメプリ, Damepuri), is a Japanese otome game created by NHN PlayArt. It was released in Japan on March 31, 2016, for Android and iOS devices. An anime television series adaptation produced by Studio Flad, titled Dame×Prince Anime Caravan, aired from January 10 to March 28, 2018.

== Plot ==
Living peacefully despite her poverty, Ani Inako is suddenly attacked by the neighboring militaristic nation of Mildonia. The king is injured and difference in national power is stark, putting the country in a critical situation. Her mother sent her to Selenpharen, a religious nation that is rivals with Mildonia. Armed with a caravan filled with Inako's specialties and using the strategy map given to her by her mother, she sets out for each country, where a love story between Ani and eccentric princes unfolds.

== Characters ==
Ani Inako (アニ・イナコ)
Voiced by: Sayuri Yahagi
Ani is the poor princess of the small and weak nation of Inako.
Teo Colton (テオ・コルトン, Teo Koruton)
Voiced by: Tomoaki Maeno
Gurimaru (グリまる)
Voiced by: Ayaka Saitō
Narek Ischl de Milidonia (ナレク・イシュル・ド・ミリドニア, Nareku Ishuru do Miridonia)
Voiced by: Kaito Ishikawa
Vino von Lomzard (ヴィーノ・フォン・ロンザード, Vīno fon Ronzādo)
Voiced by: Yūichirō Umehara
Riot Volte (リオット・ヴォルテ, Riotto Vorute)
Voiced by: Shunsuke Takeuchi
Ruze Selen el Phiriazar (リュゼ・セレン・エル = フィリアザール, Ruze Seren eru Firiazāru)
Voiced by: Soma Saito
Mare Selen el Phiriazar (メア・セレン・エル = フィリアザール, Mea Seren eru Firiazāru)
Voiced by: Ryōhei Kimura
Chrom Rem (クロム・レム, Kuromu Remu)
Voiced by: Eiji Takemoto

== Media ==
=== Anime ===
An anime television series adaptation produced by Studio Flad titled Dame×Prince Anime Caravan, aired from January 10, 2018, to March 28, 2018. The opening theme is "D×D×D" by Breakerz. The anime is licensed by Sentai Filmworks and streamed on Hidive.

No.	Title (Note: All English titles are taken from Hidive.)	Original release date
1	"Dame Prince × Grand Entrance"; Transliteration: "Dame Ōji × Tōjō" (Japanese: ダメ王子 × 登場)	January 10, 2018
2	"Militarism × Milidonia"; Transliteration: "Gunji Kokka × Miridonia" (Japanese: 軍事国家 × ミリドニア)	January 17, 2018
3	"Indoctrination × Selenfalen"; Transliteration: "Shūkyō Kokka × Serenfāren" (Japanese: 宗教国家 × セレンファーレン)	January 24, 2018
4	"Grim Prospects!? × Courtesy Call"; Transliteration: "Zento Tanan!? × hyōkei hōmon" (Japanese: 前途多難!? × 表敬訪問)	January 31, 2018
5	"Great Man Hunt × Little Lost Prince"; Transliteration: "Dai Sōsaku × Roiyaru Mago" (Japanese: 大捜索 × ロイヤル迷子)	February 7, 2018
6	"Showdown X Fashionista"; Transliteration: "Taiketsu × Oshare-san" (Japanese: 対決 × オシャレさん)	February 14, 2018
7	"Nothing but Naked × Hot Spring Town"; Transliteration: "Hadaka Ikkan × Onsen-gō" (Japanese: 裸一貫 × 温泉郷)	February 21, 2018
8	"Terrifying × The Town of No Adults"; Transliteration: "Kyōfu × Otona ga Kieta Mura" (Japanese: 恐怖 × 大人が消えた村)	February 28, 2018
9	"Last Dance × Duel"; Transliteration: "Rasuto Dansu × Sōdatsu-sen" (Japanese: ラストダンス × 争奪戦)	March 7, 2018
10	"Maelstorm × Milidonia"; Transliteration: "Dōran × Milidonia" (Japanese: 動乱 × ミリドニア)	March 14, 2018
11	"Secret Dealings × Selenfalen"; Transliteration: "Anyaku × Serenfāren" (Japanese: 暗躍 × セレンファーレン)	March 21, 2018
12	"Finale! × Dame Prince"; Transliteration: "Kecchaku! × Dame Ōji" (Japanese: 決着! × ダメ王子)	March 28, 2018

=== Web radio ===
A program titled Soma Saito & Kaito Ishikawa's DamePri Radio (斉藤壮馬・石川界人のダメプリ Radio, Saito Soma, Ishikawa Kaito no DamePuri Radio) was streamed on Cho! A&G+ from January 3 to March 28, 2018. Archived episodes were also available on d Anime Store every Thursday afternoon from January 11 to April 5 of the same year. The program was hosted by Soma Saito and Kaito Ishikawa, who respectively voiced Ruze and Narek.

Starting April 4, 2018, a revamped version titled Soma Saito & Kaito Ishikawa's DamePri Radio began streaming on Cho! A&G+. It featured the latest information on works and merchandise from its sponsor, Movic. Like the predecessor, this program is also available via archive streaming on Anime Store.

=== Stage play ===
A stage play featured an original stage story and is presented as a "musical-style stage show" incorporating songs, dance, and choreographed sword fighting. The performance includes a branching narrative with two distinct paths, the "Love Route" and "Dame Route", allowing the audience to enjoy different endings.

- DamePri Stage Play: "Useless Princes vs. Perfect Prince"
- DamePri Stage Play: "Useless Princes vs. Imposter Prince"
