= Haruna (name) =

- Pronunciation: HAH-roo-nah
- Gender: Female

Origin
- Origin: Japanese
- Meaning: Different meanings depending on the kanji used
- Region of origin: Japan

Haruna is both a feminine Japanese given name and a Japanese surname.

== Written forms ==
Haruna can be written using different kanji characters and can mean:

- 春菜, "spring, vegetable"
- 春奈, "spring, Nara"
- 春南, "spring, south"
- 春名, "spring, name"
- 陽南, "sunlight, south"
- 治南, "govern, south"
- 晴成, "bright, successful"
- 遥南, "long ago, south"
- 治成, "reign, to become"
- 晴名, "bright, name"
- 張馳, "stretch, run, gallop"

The name can also be written in hiragana (はるな) or katakana (ハルナ).

== People with the name ==
=== Given name ===
- Haruna Asami (浅見 八瑠奈; born 1988), Japanese judoka
- Haruna Fukuoka (福岡 春菜; born 1974), Japanese table tennis player
- Haruna Hosoya (細谷 はるな; born 1973), Japanese athlete
- Haruna Ikezawa (池澤 春菜; born 1975), Japanese actress
- Haruna Iikubo (飯窪 春菜; born 1994), Japanese actress
- Haruna Ishikawa (石川 晴菜; born 1994), Japanese alpine skier
- Haruna Kawaguchi (川口 春奈; born 1995), Japanese actress and model
- Haruna Kojima (小嶋 陽菜; born 1988), Japanese entertainer
- Haruna Kuboyama (久保 晴菜; born 1996), Japanese sprinter
- Haruna Lee, Japanese Taiwanese American theatre maker and writer
- Haruna Matsumoto (松本 遥奈; born 1993), Japanese snowboarder
- Haruna Miyake (三宅 榛名; born 1942), Japanese pianist and composer
- Haruna Ogata (尾形 春水; born 1999), Japanese idol and singer
- Haruna Okuno (奥野 春菜; born 1999), Japanese sport wrestler
- Haruna Sakakibara (榊原 春奈; born 1994), Japanese rower
- Haruna Suzuki (鈴木 春奈; born 1997), Japanese figure skater
- Haruna Yabuki (矢吹 春奈; born 1984), Japanese entertainer
- Haruna Yoneyama (米山 知奈; born 1991), Japanese ice hockey player

=== Surname ===
- Ai Haruna (はるな 愛; born 1972), Japanese transgender television personality and singer
- Ami Haruna (春名 愛海; born 1984), Japanese model and actress
- Fūka Haruna (春名 風花; born 2001), Japanese child actress
- Luna Haruna (春奈 るな; born 1991), Japanese singer and fashion model
- Masahito Haruna (春名 真仁; born 1973), Japanese ice hockey player
- Masaki Haruna (春名 真樹; born 1970), better known as Klaha, Japanese singer-songwriter
- Mika Haruna (春名 美佳; born 1978), Japanese swimmer

== Fictional characters ==
=== Given name ===
- Haruna (ハルナ), a character in the manga series Aoki Hagane no Arpeggio
- Haruna (ハルナ), a character in the light novel series Kore wa Zombie Desu ka?
- Haruna (榛名), a character in the manga series Onsen Yōsei Hakone-chan
- Haruna (ハルナ), a character in the anime film Tenchi Forever! The Movie
- Haruna (ハルナ), a character in the manga series The World of Narue
- Haruna Kisaragi (如月 春菜), a character in the anime and manga series Corrector Yui
- Haruna Morikawa (森川 はるな), a character in the television series Kousoku Sentai Turboranger
- Haruna Otonashi (音無 春奈; called Celia Hills in the dub), a character in the video game Inazuma Eleven
- Haruna Otoo (音尾 春菜), a character in the manga series Working!!
- Haruna Sairenji (西連寺 春菜), a character in the manga series To Love-Ru
- Haruna Sakurada (桜田 春菜; called Patricia Haruna in the original English dub), a character in the manga series Sailor Moon
- Haruna Saotome (早乙女 ハルナ), a character in the manga series Negima! Magister Negi Magi
- Haruna Yuki (悠木 陽菜), a character in the visual novel Fortune Arterial
- Haruna Kurodate (黒舘 ハルナ), a character in the role-playing video game Blue Archive
- Haruna Wakazato (若里 春名), a male character from The Idolmaster SideM

=== Surname ===
- Hiroko Haruna (春名 ヒロ子), a character in the manga series Hamtaro
- Yuu Haruna (榛名 優), protagonist of the manga series Fuuka
- Motoki Haruna (榛名元希), a character in the manga series Big Windup!
