= List of To Love Ru chapters =

Cover of the first tankōbon volume of To Love Ru, as published by Shueisha on November 2, 2006

To Love Ru is a Japanese manga series written by Saki Hasemi and illustrated by Kentaro Yabuki. The series was published by Shueisha in Weekly Shōnen Jump magazine from April 24, 2006, to August 31, 2009. It chronicles the life of high school student Rito Yuuki after he meets and accidentally gets engaged to the alien princess Lala Satalin Deviluke. The 162 chapters were collected into 18 tankōbon volumes, published between November 2, 2006 and April 2, 2010. The series was republished in a 10-volume bunkoban edition between November 18, 2016 and March 17, 2017. To celebrate Yabuki's 20th anniversary as a professional artist, a special To Love Ru story was published in Weekly Shōnen Jump on April 27, 2019. A To Love Ru one-shot was released on the Shōnen Jump+ website on January 13, 2023, to commemorate an art exhibition held as a conclusion to the manga's 15th anniversary celebrations. To celebrate the manga's 20th anniversary, a 25-page To Love Ru one-shot was published in the Summer 2026 issue of Jump Giga on August 17, 2026.

A continuation of the manga, titled To Love Ru Darkness, was serialized in Shueisha's monthly Jump Square magazine from October 4, 2010 to March 4, 2017. Two additional "extra" chapters were published in the May and June 2017 issues of Jump Square. The 77 chapters of the manga were collected into 18 tankōbon volumes, published between March 4, 2011 and April 4, 2017. A full-color To Love Ru Darkness one-shot was published in Jump Square on May 2, 2019 to celebrate Yabuki's 20th anniversary as a professional artist. The series was republished in a 10-volume bunkoban edition between October 16, 2020 and February 18, 2021. To Love Ru Parade, a book collecting previously uncollected To Love Ru and To Love Ru Darkness one-shots, was published on October 2, 2026.

== Volume list ==
=== To Love Ru ===
No.	Title	Original release date	English release date
1	The Girl Who Came From the Sky; Maiorita Shōjo (舞い降りた少女)	November 2, 2006; 978-4-08-874278-6	December 5, 2017; 978-1-947804-00-5
1. "The Girl Who Came From the Sky" (舞い降りた少女, Maiorita Shōjo); 2. "Love's Great Escape" (愛の大脱出, Ai no Dai Dasshutsu); 3. "Milky Way Messenger" (銀河からの使者, Ginga Kara no Shisha); 4. "After-School Memories" (放課後のメモリー, Hōkago no Memorī); 5. "The Approach" (接近, Sekkin); 6. "The Targeted Girl" (狙われた少女, Nerawareta Shōjo); 7. "Space Invader" (宇宙からの侵入者, Uchū Kara no Shin'nyūsha)
2	The Steamy, Heart-Pounding Mood of a Traveler; Dokidoki Yukemuri Ryojō (ドキドキ湯けむり旅情)	February 2, 2007; 978-4-08-874322-6	December 5, 2017; 978-1-947804-00-5
8. "His True Form" (真の姿, Shin no Sugata); 9. "Shopping Panic" (お買い物パニック, Okaimono Pa'nikku); 10. "Another Confession?!" (告白再び!?, Kokuhaku Futatabi!?); 11. "The Workplace is a Battlefield?!" (仕事場は戦場!?, Shigotoba wa Senjō!?); 12. "Midsummer Paparazzi" (真夏のパパラッチ, Manatsu no Paparatchi); 13. "Swirling Underwater Desire" (水中に渦巻く欲望, Suichū ni Uzumaku Yokubō); 14. "Idiot Typhoon" (台風のバカー, Taifū no Bakā); 15. "The Steamy, Heart-Pounding Mood of a Traveler" (ドキドキ湯けむり旅情, Dokidoki Yukemuri Ryojō); 16. "The Fated Test of Courage" (運命の肝だめし, Unmei no Kimodameshi)
3	Charge! The Secret Flower Garden; Totsugeki! Himitsu no Hanazono (突撃!秘密の花園)	April 4, 2007; 978-4-08-874345-5	January 30, 2018; 978-1-947804-06-7
17. "A Tale of Love at the Water's Edge" (渚の愛のものがたり, Nagisa no Ai no Monogatari); 18. "Charge! The Secret Flower Garden" (突撃!秘密の花園, Totsugeki! Himitsu no Hanazono); 19. "The One She Likes" (好きな人, Suki na Hito); 20. "The Transfer Student Who Calls the Storm" (嵐を呼ぶ転校生, Arashi o Yobu Tenkōsei); 21. "The Eyewitness" (目撃, Mokugeki); 22. "Rito vs. Ren" (リトvs.レン, Rito Bāsasu Ren); 23. "The Smooch Scramble" (唇争奪戦, Kuchibiru Sōdatsusen); 24. "The Age of Animals?!" (時代はアニマル!?, Jidai wa Animaru!?); 25. "The Queen's Temptation" (クイーンの誘惑, Kuīn no Yūwaku)
4	I Wanna Know You Better; Motto Shiritai (もっと知りたい)	June 4, 2007; 978-4-08-874370-7	January 30, 2018; 978-1-947804-06-7
26. "The Sainan Festival is a Huge Disaster" (彩南祭は大災難, Sainan-sai wa Dai Sainan); 27. "Rito's Long Day" (リトのある長い一日, Rito no Aru Nagai Ichinichi); 28. "Invention of Fear" (恐怖の発明品, Kyōfu no Hatsumeihin); 29. "Small Adventure" (スモールアドベンチャー, Sumōru Adobenchā); 30. "A Modest Change" (女は淑やかに, Onna wa Shitoyaka ni; lit. 'Ladies, Be Modest'); 31. "Don't Yell at Me!" (怒れないでよ!, Okorenaide Yo!); 32. "I Wanna Know You Better" (もっと知りたい, Motto Shiritai); 33. "Get Those Presents!" (プレゼントをGETせよ, Purezento o Getto se Yo); 34. "Heavy Christmas" (ヘビー·クリスマス, Hebī Kurisumasu)
5	Golden Darkness; Konjiki no Yami (金色の闇)	August 3, 2007; 978-4-08-874405-6	March 20, 2018; 978-1-947804-08-1
35. "Golden Darkness" (金色の闇, Konjiki no Yami); 36. "The Power of the Darkness" (闇の実力, Yami no Jitsuryoku); 37. "Princess vs. Assassin" (プリンセスvs.暗殺者, Purinsesu Bāsasu Ansatsusha); 38. "The Darkness Clears?" (闇晴れる?, Yami Hareru?); 39. "Slippery Transformations" (つるっと変化, Tsuru to Henge); 40. "Fiendish Valentine" (凶悪バレンタイン, Kyōaku Barentain); 41. "Chocolate and Panic" (チョコっとパニック, Chokotto Pa'nikku); 42. "Confession of Love" (告白, Kokuhaku); 43. "A Doggone Good Day" (ワンダフルライフ, Wandafuru Raifu; lit. 'Wonderful Life')
6	Starting Once Again; Mō Ichido Koko Kara (もう一度ここから)	October 4, 2007; 978-4-08-874428-5	March 20, 2018; 978-1-947804-08-1
44. "A Doggone Good Day 2" (ワンダフルライフ2, Wandafuru Raifu Ni; lit. 'Wonderful Life 2'); 45. "Clinic of Darkness" (闇の診療所, Yami no Shinryōjo); 46. "A Shocking ♡ Birthday" (ドッキリ♡バースデイ, Dokkiri♡Bāsudei); 47. "Wild and Crazy Kid" (暴走小僧, Bōsō Kosō); 48. "Determination" (決意, Ketsui); 49. "Starting Once Again" (もう一度ここから, Mō Ichido Koko Kara); 50. "The Worst Class in History" (史上最悪のクラス, Shijō Saiaku no Kurasu); 51. "Captivating Manifesto" (魅惑のマニフェスト, Miwaku no Manifesuto); 52. "The Ultimate Ladies' Man" (最強のモテ男, Saikyō no Mote Otoko)
7	The One Haruna Likes; Haruna no Suki na Hito (春菜の好きな人)	January 4, 2008; 978-4-08-874469-8	May 29, 2018; 978-1-947804-11-1
53. "The One Haruna Likes" (春菜の好きな人, Haruna no Suki na Hito); 54. "Welcome to the Yuuki House!" (ようこそ!結城家へ, Yōkoso! Yuuki-ke e); 55. "Old Schoolhouse Infiltration!" (潜入!旧校舎, Sen'nyū! Kyūkōsha); 56. "Looming Fear" (迫り来る恐怖, Semari Kuru Kyōfu); 57. "Residents of the Old Schoolhouse" (旧校舎の住人たち, Kyūkōsha no Jūnin-tachi); 58. "An Unexpected Outcome" (意外な結末, Igai na Ketsumatsu); 59. "The Queen in Love" (恋する女王, Koi Suru Quīn); 60. "Pretty Rough, Huh?" (大変だねェ, Taihen da Nē); 61. "Yami-Yami Fashion" (ヤミヤミファッション, Yami-Yami Fasshon)
8	Heart-Pounding ♥ Survival; Dokidoki♥Sabaiburu (ドキドキ♥サバイバル)	March 4, 2008; 978-4-08-874488-9	May 29, 2018; 978-1-947804-11-1
62. "Fresh Love at the Summer Festival" (恋人気分で夏祭り, Koibito Kibun de Natsu Matsuri); 63. "The Limits of Revenge..." (復讐の果てに..., Fukushū no Hate ni...); 64. "Something's Up with Haruna-chan" (おかしな春菜ちゃん, Okashi na Haruna-chan); 65. "Get Her Body Back!" (身体を取り戻せ, Karada o Torimodose); 66. "Swim, Dolphin-kun!" (泳げ!イルカくん, Oyoge! Iruka-kun); 67. "Inhabitants of the Freaky Forest" (怪奇の森の住人, Kaiki no Mori no Jūnin); 68. "Heart-Pounding ♥ Survival" (ドキドキ♥サバイバル, Dokidoki♥Sabaibaru); 69. "Lost Kids" (迷子な人びと, Maigo na Hitobito); 70. "Midnight Tutor" (深夜の家庭教師, Shinsha no Kateikyōshi)
9	A Curious Night; Kininaru Yoru (気になる夜)	May 2, 2008; 4-08-874514-0	September 25, 2018; 978-1-947804-15-9
71. "The Enemy of My Enemy is My Friend?" (敵の敵は味方?, Teki no Teki wa Mikata?); 72. "The Strongest Girl in the Universe" (宇宙一強い女の子, Uchū Ichi Tsuyoi Onna no Ko); 73. "Bad Mood? Good Mood?" (不機嫌?ご機嫌?, Fukigen? Gokigen?); 74. "Demerit" (減点, Genten); 75. "A Curious Relationship" (奇妙な関係, Kimyō na Kankei); 76. "Sleepover" (お泊り会, Otomari Kai); 77. "A Curious Night" (気になる夜, Kininaru Yoru); 78. "Crisis" (危機, Kiki); 79. "A Choice" (選択, Sentaku)
10	Bath Wars; Ofuroba Sensō (お風呂場戦争)	August 4, 2008; 978-4-08-874543-5	September 25, 2018; 978-1-947804-15-9
80. "Love Master" (恋愛マスター, Ren'ai Masutā); 81. "Love Queen?!" (恋愛クイーン!?, Ren'ai Quīn!?); 82. "Transform!" (変身, Henshin); 83. "Love+Sports=?!" (恋+スポーツ=!?, Koi+Supōtsu=!?); 84. "The Sports Festival Continues" (体育祭の裏で..., Taikusai no Ura de...; lit. 'Dark Side of the Athletic Festival...'); 85. "Let's Play!♪" (お遊戯しましょ♪, Oyūgi Shimasho ♪); 86. "Your Little Sister..." (妹よ..., Imōto yo...); 87. "Bath War" (お風呂場戦争, Ofuroba Sensō); 88. "Bath War 2" (お風呂場戦争2, Ofuroba Sensō Ni); Bonus Chapter. "Burn, Magical Kyouko, The Dynamite Girl!!" (爆熱少女マジカルキョーコ炎!!, Bakunetsu Shōjo Majikaru Kyōko Fureimu!!)
11	To Love Ru Quest; Toraburu Kuesuto (とらぶるくえすと)	October 3, 2008; 4-08-874567-1	February 19, 2019; 978-1-947804-23-4
89. "Resurrected Transfer Student" (蘇る転校生, Yomigaeru Tenkōsei); 90. "I'll Serve You!♡" (奉仕しちゃうぞ, Hōshi Shichauzo); 91. "Honest Feelings" (真っ直ぐなキモチ, Massugu na Kimochi); 92. "An Unexpected Visit" (珍客訪問, Chinkyaku Hōmon); 93. "To Love Ru Quest 1" (とらぶるくえすと, Toraburu Kuesuto); 94. "To Love Ru Quest 2" (とらぶるくえすと2, Toraburu Kuesuto Ni); 95. "To Love Ru Quest 3" (とらぶるくえすと3, Toraburu Kuesuto San); 96. "To Love Ru Quest 4" (とらぶるくえすと4, Toraburu Kuesuto Yon); 97. "To Love Ru Quest 5" (とらぶるくえすと5, Toraburu Kuesuto Go); Bonus Chapter. "Big Trouble, Bath Love♡" (バス·ラブ·大トラブル♡, Basu Rabu Dai Toraburu♡)
12	A Rather Girly Boy♡ Otome Chikku Bōi♡ (乙女ちっくボーイ♡)	January 5, 2009; 978-4-08-874618-0	February 19, 2019; 978-1-947804-23-4
98. "To Love Ru Quest 6" (とらぶるくえすと6, Toraburu Kuesuto Roku), tankōbon: "Lala's Little Sisters" (ララの妹たち, Rara no Imōto Tachi); 99. "What Our Hearts Are Made Of" (心の占める割合, Kokoro no Shimeru Wariai); 100. "Triple To Love Ru" (とらぶる×トラブル×To LOVEる, Toraburu×Toraburu×To Love Ru); 101. "A Rather Girly Boy♡" (乙女ちっくボーイ♡, Otome Chikku Bōi♡); 102. "A Sexual Conversion!" (セクシュアルに、転換せよ, Sekushuaru ni, Tenkan se Yo); 103. "I'm Gonna Become an Idol♡" (アイドルになるもん♡, Aidoru ni Narumon♡); 104. "Brother & Sister" (兄妹, Kyōdai); 105. "Wonderful Love♡" (ワンダフル·ラブ♡, Wandafuru Rabu♡); 106. "My Beloved Cinderella♡" (愛しの君はシンデレラ♡, Itoshi no Kimi wa Shinderera♡); Bonus Chapter. "A Day with Maron" (マロンの1日, Marron no Wan Nichi)
13	On Festival's Eve; Matsuri no Yoru ni (祭りの夜に)	April 3, 2009; 978-4-08-874652-4	June 11, 2019; 978-1-947804-31-9
107. "The Curious Sound of Love♡" (チクタク チクタク 恋の音♡, Chikutaku CHikutaku Koi no Oto♡); 108. "Twins' ☆ Escape" (ツインズ☆エスケイプ, Tsuinzu Esukuipu); 109. "Through the Looking-Googles" (レンズ越しに見る君は..., Renzu Goshi ni Miru Kimi wa...); 110. "On Festival's Eve" (祭りの夜に, Matsuri no Yoru ni); 111. "Beneath the Fireworks" (花火の下で, Hanabi no Shita de); 112. "Trouble at the Festival" (祭りはまだ..., Matsuri wa Mada...; lit. 'The Festival is Still...'); 113. "Beach Gals♡" (ビーチ·ガールズ♡, Bīchi Gāruzu♡); 114. "Watermelon Panic!" (スイカ·パニック!, Suika Pa'nikku!); 115. "Exorcising Exercise" (エクササイズ·エレジー, Ekusasaizu Erejī; lit. 'Exercise Elegy'); Bonus Chapter. "The Legend of a Principal Like No Other" (絶校長伝説, Zekkōchō Densetsu)
14	Beloved Friends♡ Koi Tomo♡ (恋友♡)	June 4, 2009; 978-4-08-874676-0	June 11, 2019; 978-1-947804-31-9
116. "Dandy Dogman" (ダンディ·マン·ドッグ, Dandi Man Doggu); 117. "Love Prediction" (恋愛予報, Ren'ai Yohō); 118. "The Power of Love" (恋の力, Koi no Chikara); 119. "One Step in Romance" (恋する一歩, Koi Suru Ippo); 120. "Special Love Medicine♡" (特恋薬♡, Tokkō Yaku♡); 121. "Metamorphose" (メタモルフォーゼ, Metamorufōze); 122. "Beloved Friend♡" (恋友♡, Koi Tomo♡); 123. "Hostile Heart" (敵対心, Tekitaishin); 124. "And Now, To Space!" (いざ、宇宙へ, Iza, Uchū E); Bonus Chapter. "A Little Something Extra♡" (妄·チョコ♡, Mō Choko♡; lit. 'Delusional Chocolate♡')
15	Petal Princess; Hanabira-Hime (花びら姫)	August 1, 2009; 978-4-08-874714-9	August 6, 2019; 978-1-947804-34-0
125. "Planet Mistwa" (惑星ミストア, Wakusei Misutoa); 126. "Deep in the Mist" (霧の中で..., Kiri no Naka de...); 127. "Omens" (萌し, Kizashi); 128. "Petal Princess" (花びら姫, Hanabira-Hime); 129. "Pollen Telepathy" (花粉伝心, Kafun Denshin); 130. "For Whom the Bell Tolls" (誰がためにベルは鳴る, Dareka Tame ni Beru wa Naru); 131. "The Queen's Rebellion" (クイーンの反抗, Kuīn no Hankō); 132. "Return of the Queen" (クイーンの帰還, Kuīn no Kikan); 133. "To Love Ru Game" (とらぶるゲーム, Toraburu Gēmu), tankōbon: "A Bloodcurdling New Year's Party" (戦慄の新年会, Senritsu no Shin'nenkai)
16	The Boy, the Chocolate, and... Me; Danshi to Choko to... Watashi (男子とチョコと...私)	November 4, 2009; 978-4-08-874736-1	August 6, 2019; 978-1-947804-34-0
134. "To Love Ru Game 2" (とらぶるゲーム2, Toraburu Gēmu Ni), tankōbon: "Forced on the Board" (強引なる盤上, Gōin Naru Banjō); 135. "To Love Ru Game 3" (とらぶるゲーム3, Toraburu Gēmu San), tankōbon: "Tragedy? An Elopement of Love..." (悲劇?愛の逃避行, Higeki? Ai no Tōhikō); 136. "The Boy, the Chocolate, and... Me" (男子とチョコと...私, Danshi to Choko to... Watashi); 137. "Sweet Dreams Taste Like Chocolate" (甘い気持ちはチョコの味, Amai Kimochi wa Choko no Aji); 138. "Climate for an Unexpected Incident" (ハプニング日和, Hapuningu Biyori; lit. 'Happening Weather'); 139. "Im Feeling Like Transforming" (気分はトランス, Kibun wa Toransu); 140. "Here Comes Haruna" (春の足音, Haru no Ashioto; lit. 'Footsteps of Spring'); 141. "What Is Love?" (知らぬが恋?, Shiranu ga Koi?); 142. "It's a Bit Drafy Today, Isn't It?♪" (すきま風♪, Sukima Kaze)
17	A Girl's Feelings; On'na no Ko no Kimochi (オンナノコノキモチ)	February 4, 2010; 978-4-08-874765-1	November 26, 2019; 978-1-947804-39-5
143. "Hand & Tail" (ハンド&テール, Hando ando Teiru); 144. "Ghost Versus" (ゴースト·バーサス, Gōsuto Bāsasu); 145. "That Which is Reflected in Those Eyes" (その瞳にうつるもの, Sono Hitomi ni Utsuru Mono); 146. "That Which is Reflected in the Darkness" (暗闇の中でうつるもの, Kurayami no Naka de Utsuru Mono); 147. "A Girl's Feelings" (オンナノコノキモチ, On'na no Ko no Kimochi); 148. "Silent Island" (サイレント·アイランド, Sairento Airando); 149. "A Determined Cat" (決意するネコ, Ketsui Suru Neko); 150. "A Smiling Cat" (微笑むネコ, Hohoemu Neko); 151. "Friends" (トモダチ, Tomodachi); 152. "Style by Rito" (リト·スタイル, Rito Sutairu)
18	Love You♡ Daisuki♡ (大スキ♡)	April 2, 2010; 978-4-08-870022-9	November 26, 2019; 978-1-947804-39-5
153. "A Nuisance Rampage?" (迷惑暴走?, Meiwaku Bōsō?); 154. "An Idol and Her Love" (恋心アイドル, Koigokoro Aidoru); 155. "Heart-Pounding☆Mail" (ドキドキ☆メール, Dokidoki☆Meiru); 156. "Grow Up Big and Strong!♪" (大きくなぁーれ♪, Ōkiku Nāre); 157. "Disquiet on the Sister Front" (「妹」戦線異状アリ, 'Imōto' Sensen Ijō Ari); 158. "A Love Most False?" (偽りの恋?, Itsuwari no Koi?); 159. "Summer Memories" (夏の思い出, Natsu no Omoide); 160. "That Love... Those Feelings..." (その想い...その気持ち..., Sono Omoi, Sono Kimochi); 161. "Someone Special" (大切な人, Taisetsu na Hito); 162. "Love You!♡" (大スキ♡, Daisuki♡)

=== To Love Ru Darkness ===
No.	Original release date	Original ISBN	English release date	English ISBN
1	March 4, 2011	978-4-08-870205-6	December 5, 2017	978-1-947804-01-2
1. "Prologue ~Project Activation~" (Prologue～プロジェクト始動～, Prologue ~Purojekuto Shidō~); 2. "Continue" (Continue～コンティニュー～, Continue ~Kontinyū~); 3. "Doubt and Dish" (Doubt and dish～疑惑と料理～, Doubt and Dish ~Giwaku to Ryōri~); 4. "Each Speculation" (Each speculation～それぞれの思惑～, Each Speculation ~Sorezore no Omowaku~); 5. "Exciting Squall" (Exciting squall～騒動は突然に～, Exciting Squall ~Sōdō wa Totsuzen ni~)
2	July 4, 2011	978-4-08-870264-3	January 30, 2018	978-1-947804-07-4
5. "Uneasiness: Peace & Anxiety" (Uneasiness～安らぎと不安～, Uneasiness ~Yasuragi to Fuan~); 6. "True Smile: Smiles, Friends, and the Past" (True smile～過去と友達と笑顔と～, True Smile ~Kako to Tomodachi to Egao to~); 7. "Worry: That Which Connects Us" (Worry～その想い...つなぐもの～, Worry ~Sono Omoi... Tsunagumono~); 8. "A Man? A Woman?: Those Who Change" (A Man? Woman?～変わり行くもの達～, A Man? Woman? ~Kawari Yuku Mono-tachi~); Bonus Chapter. "Pollen Plan: Deadly Little Sister Love Affair" (Pollen plan～危険な妹情事～, Pollen Plan ~Kiken na Imōto Jōji~)
3	November 4, 2011	978-4-08-870341-1	February 27, 2018	978-1-947804-17-3
9. "Metamorphose ~Time of Change~" (Metamorphose～変わり行く時～, Metamorphose ~Kawari Yuku Toki~); 10. "Sisters ~Lala, the Invention of Happiness~" (Sisters～幸せの発明品・ララ～, Sisters ~Shiawase no Hatsumeihin Rara~); 11. "True Self ~The Face Lurking in the Darkness~" (True self～闇の中の素顔～, True Self ~Yami no Naka no Sugao~); 12. "Bad Mood ~The Bonds that Make Us Happy~" (Bad mood～幸せの絆～, Bad Mood ~Shiawase no Kizuna~); Bonus Chapter. "First Love ~Here Before You Know It~" (First love～気がつけば初恋?～, First Love ~Kigatsukeba Hatsukoi?~)
4	March 2, 2012	978-4-08-870394-7	April 17, 2018	978-1-947804-18-0
13. "Adhesion: Don't Leave? Don't Let Go?" (Adhesion～離れない?離さない?～, Adhesion ~Hanarenai? Hanasanai?~); 14. "Past: Memories Leading to Tomorrow" (Past～明日につながる記憶～, Past ~Ashita ni Tsunagaru Kioku~); 15. "Refrain: Warmth" (Refrain～温暖～, Refrain ~Ondan~); 16. "The Right Thing: What's a Way of Life?" (The right thing～生き方って何?～, The Right Thing ~Ikikatatte Nani?~); Bonus Chapter. "Body Touch: A Kitty Big Problem" (Body touch?～ニャンダフルライフ～, Body Touch ~Nyandafuru Raifu~) Bonus Chapter. "Room: A Maiden's Thoughts" (Room～乙女の想い～, Room ~Otome no Omoi~)
5	August 17, 2012	978-4-08-870487-6	June 26, 2018	978-1-947804-19-7
17. "Trigger: Intensification of Love" (Trigger～愛情激か～, Trigger ~Ai Jougekika?~); 18. "Exchange: You and Me" (Exchange～オレと私～, Exchange ~Ore to Watashi~); 19. "Nostalgia: In That Time, At That Place" (Nostalgia～あの時、あの場所で～, Nostalgia ~Ano Toki, Ano Basho de~); 20. "Uneasy: The Heart's Hesitation" (Uneasy～心の迷い～, Uneasy ~Kokoro no Mayoi~); Bonus Chapter. "Flower: Budding Feelings?" (Flower～芽生える感情?～, Flower ~Mebaeru Kanjō?-) Bonus Chapter. "The Changing Heart: Honest Emotions" (The changing heart～素直な感情～, The Changing Heart ~Sunao na Kanjō~)
6	December 19, 2012	978-4-08-870559-0	September 18, 2018	978-1-947804-20-3
21. "Rain: The Storm Brewing" (Rain～まだ、今までのように～, Rain ~Mada, Ima Made no Yō Ni~); 22. "Friends: The Calm Beyond the Storm" (After a storm comes a calm～ともだち～, After a Storm Comes a Calm ~Tomodachi~); 23. "Summer Festival: The Festival Begins" (Summer Festival～祭りの始まり～, Summer Festival ~Matsuri no Hajimari~); 24. "Door of Fate: What Lies Ahead" (The Door of Fate～そしてこれから～, The Door of Fate ~Soshite Korekara~); Bonus Chapter. "Anxiety (1) ~Is This Okay?~" (Anxious(1)～これで大丈夫？～, Anxious(1) ~Kore de Daijōbu?~) Bonus Chapter. "Anxious (2) ~The Fretful Girl and the Older Brother~" (Anxious(2)～悩める乙女と兄～, Anxious(2) ~Nayameru Otome to Ani~)
7	April 4, 2013	978-4-08-870654-2	October 30, 2018	978-1-947804-21-0
25. "New Move: Two of a Kind?" (New Move～似たものどうし？～, New Move ~Nitamo no Dōshi?~); 26. "Drunk on Love: Light-Headed☆Heart-Pounding" (Unconsciously～頭ふわふわ☆心どきどき～, Unconsciously ~Atama FuwaFuwa☆Kokoro DokiDoki~); 27. "Mouseventure: Rito's Ratty Day" (Adventure～リトネズミの冒険～, Adventure ~Rito Nezumi no Bōken~); Bonus Chapter. "Burn, Magical♥Kyouko, The Dynamite Girl" (縛熱少女 マジカルキョ－コフレイム, Bakunetsu Shōjo Majikaru Kyōko Fureimu): 28. "Infiltration: Kyouko's Coming to School?" (Infiltration～キョ－コ！参る？～, Infiltration ~Kyōko! Mairu?~); Bonus Chapter. "So Many Feels: Can Teacher Take It?" (It Feels～耐える教師！～, It Feels ~Taeru Kyōshi!~)
8	August 19, 2013	978-4-08-870790-7	December 18, 2018	978-1-947804-22-7
29. "Manservant: The Competition" (Manservant～争奪戦～, Manservant ~Sōdatsu-sen~); 30. "Resistance: I Understand, But..." (Resistance～わかっているけど～, Resistance ~Wakatte Irukedo~); 31. "Cleaning: Magnificently Tidy ♪" (Cleaning～華麗に綺麗♪～, Cleaning ~Karei ni Kirei♪~); 32. "Danger: Perils" (Danger～危·剣～, Danger ~Ki Ken~); Bonus Chapter. "Adhesion: He's Not Trying to Be Mean..." (Adhesion～悪気はないけど～, Adhesion ~Warugi Wanaikedo~) Bonus Chapter. "Mobile Phone: Pulse-Pounding ☆ Voice" (Mobile phone～ドキドキ☆ボイス～, Mobile Phone ~DokiDoki☆Boisu~)
9	December 4, 2013	978-4-08-870865-2	February 26, 2019	978-1-947804-27-2
33. "Gratitude: Developing Feelings" (Appreciation～進みゆく想い～, Appreciation ~Susumi Yuku Omoi~); 34. "Heart-to-Heart: Sisterly Love" (When talking～姉妹恋愛事情～, When Talking ~Shimai Ren'ai Jijō~); 35. "Kissing: What Comes Next?" (Kiss～キスの先にあるもの～, Kiss ~Kisu no Saki ni Aru Mono~); 36. "True Intentions: Girls and Their Worries" (Real intention～悩める少女たち～, Real Intention ~Nayameru Shōjo-tachi~); Bonus Chapter. "Sudden Surprise: Imagination VS. Reality" (Suddenly～想像と現実～, Suddenly ~Sōzō to Genjitsu~) Bonus Chapter. "Ghost Story: Make It a Real Bloodcurdler!" (Ghost story～怖いのはいかが？～, Ghost Story ~Kowai no wa Ikaga?~) "4-Panel Theater" (4コマ劇場, 4-Koma Gekijō)
10	April 4, 2014	978-4-08-880051-6	April 30, 2019	978-1-947804-28-9
37. "Her True Self: Who She Really Is" (True Character～正体バレた⁉～, True Character ~Shōtai Bare ta⁉~); 38. "At the Clinic: Having Trouble Being Honest" (Clinic～素直になねなくて～, Clinic ~Sunao ni na Nenakute~); 39. "Darkness: The Beginning" (The beginning of darkness～その時～, The Beginning of Darkness ~Sono Toki~); 40. "Darkness: The Release" (Release of darkness～解放～, Release of Darkness ~Kaihō~); Bonus Chapter. "Moonlight: Moonlit Angel" (Moonlight～月下の天使～, Moonlight ~Gekka no Tenshi~) Bonus Chapter. "Photography: The Perfect Shot!" (Photography～激写せよ！～, Photography ~Gekisha Seyo!~)
11	August 4, 2014	978-4-08-880160-5	July 2, 2019	978-1-947804-33-3
41. "Uncertainty: Descending Darkness" (Prediction is impossible～暴走する闇～, Prediction is Impossible ~Bōsō Suru Yami~); 42. "Escape to Believe" (Escape～信じる事～, Escape ~Shinjiru Koto~); 43. "Whose Fiancé? Lala VS. Yami" (Whose thing is a fiance？～ララVSヤミ～, Whose Thing is a Fiance? ~Lala Bāsasu Yami~); 44. "Power and Power: To Protect and To Be Protected" (Power and Power～守るものと守られるもの～, Power and Power ~Mamoru Mono to Mamora Reru Mono~); Bonus Chapter. "Technique: The Maiden's Door" (Technique～乙女の扉～, Technique ~Otome no Tobira~) Bonus Chapter. "Holiday: How Many Stars?" (Holiday～お料理の☆はいくつ？～, Holiday ~O Ryōri no☆wa Ikutsu?~)
12	December 4, 2014	978-4-08-880231-2	October 29, 2019	978-1-947804-38-8
45. "Sister: Two Weapons" (Sister～ふたつの兵器～, Sister ~Futatsu no Heiki~); 46. "The End of Darkness: I Despise Perversion" (The end of darkness～えっちぃのは嫌いです～, The End of Darkness ~Etchī no wa Kirai Desu~); 47. "Bright Future: Thank You" (Bright Future～ありがとう～, Bright Future ~Arigatō~); 48. "Restarting: Harem Plan" (Re-starting～楽園計画～, Re-starting ~Rakuen Keikaku~); Bonus Chapter. "Adhesion Panic: You Are Mad, Aren't You?" (Adhesion Panic～やっぱ......怒ってる？～, Adhesion Panic ~Yappa...... Okotte ru?~) Bonus Chapter. "Bath: It Sure is Nice... I Guess?" (Bath～いい湯......かな？～, Bath ~Ī yu...... ka na?~)
13	April 3, 2015	978-4-08-880410-1	December 17, 2019	978-1-947804-40-1
49. "Mother: Too Beautiful Angel" (Mother～美しすぎる天使～, Mother ~Utsukushi Sugiru Tenshi~); 50. "Charm: Great Mother" (Charm～偉大なる母～, Charm ~Idainaru Haha~); 51. "Baby Smile: Enfant Terrible" (Smile baby～赤ちゃんパニック～, Smile Baby ~Akachan Panikku~); 52. "Mission: Wild Date" (Mission date～ドタバタデート～, Mission Date ~Dotabata Dēto~); 53. "Spring? Try Being Honest" (Puberty?～素直になってみる～, Puberty? ~Sunao ni Natte Miru~)
14	September 4, 2015	978-4-08-880469-9	January 14, 2020	978-1-947804-43-2
54. "First Accident? Never Before..." (First accident?～初めての...～, First Accident? ~Hajimete no...~); 55. "Worry: Progress" (Worry～一歩前に～, Worry ~Ippomae Ni~), tankōbon: "I Think: Progress" (I think～一歩前に～, I Think ~Ippomae Ni~); 56. "Delight: Physical and Mental Growth" (Delight～体と心の成長～, Delight ~Tai to Kokoro no Seichō~); 57. "Principal: An Off Day" (Principal～好調じゃない一日～, Principal ~Kōchō Janai Tsuitachi~); Bonus Chapter. "Washed: Bonds of Bath Time" (Washed～洗浄の絆～, Washed ~Senjō no Kizuna~) Bonus Chapter. "Natural Face: Taking It Easy" (Natural face～やすらぎの時間～, Natural Face ~Yasuragi no Jikan~)
15	January 4, 2016	978-4-08-880589-4	April 7, 2020	978-1-947804-45-6
58. "After School Story: Disingenuous" (Story after school～気持ち裏腹～, Story After School ~Kimochi Urahara~); 59. "To Enjoy Oneself: Dark Matter" (Enjoy myself～ダークマター～, Enjoy Myself ~Dākumatā~); 60. "Power and Power: Short Strife" (Power and power～儚き闘争～, Power and Power ~Hakanaki Tōsō~); 61. "Taken: Nemesis" (taken～ネメシス～, Taken ~Nemeshisu~); 62. "The Fresh World: Always Together ♪" (The fresh world～どこでもいっしょ♪～, The Fresh World ~Dokodemoissho♪~)
16	July 4, 2016	978-4-08-880729-4	June 30, 2020 (digital); August 18, 2020 (physical)	978-1-947804-48-7
63. "All Right: All's Well That Ends Well" (All right～終わりよければ......～, All Right ~Owari Yokereba......~); 64. "Ethics: Who's Disrupting Public Morals?!" (Morals～風紀を乱す者は誰!?～, Morals ~Fūki o Midasu Mono wa Dare!?~); 65. "New Plan: Counseling" (New plan～カウンセリング～, New Plan ~Kaunseringu~); 66. "Diagnosis: Let's Do Some Tests" (Inspection～検証しましょう～, Inspection ~Kenshō Shimashou~); 67. "Real Feelings: Battle of the Heart" (Real feelings～本音でバトル～, Real Feelings ~Hon'ne de Batoru~)
17	December 2, 2016	978-4-08-880828-4	October 27, 2020	978-1-947804-49-4
68. "Idol: Just For You" (Idol～一人だけのアイドル～, Idol ~Hitoridake no Aidoru~); 69. "One Night: Let Me Stay!" (One night～お泊りしよう!～, One Night ~O Tomari Shiyou!~); 70. "Contract: Target" (Request～ターゲット～, Request ~Tāgetto~); 71. "The Reason I Fight: Something to Protect" (The reason that I fight～守る理由～, The Reason that I Fight ~Mamoru Riyū~); 72. "Black and Darkness: Feelings to Convey" (Black and darkness～伝える想い～, Black and Darkness ~Tsutaeru Omoi~)
18	April 4, 2017	978-4-08-881053-9	December 22, 2020	978-1-947804-52-4
73. "Delusion: Now What?" (Delusion～どうすればいい～, Delusion ~Dōsureba Ī~); 74. "Long Has It Been: Nemesis's Ambition" (After a long time～ネメシスの野望～, After a Long Time ~Nemeshisu no Yabō~); 75. "Sudden Confession: Precious Words" (Sudden confession～大切な言葉～, Sudden Confession ~Taisetsuna Kotoba~); 76. "It's On You Now: Resolve?!" (How will you do?～どうしますか？～, How Will You Do? ~Dō Shimasu ka?~); 77. "Let's Meet Again Sometime: Don't Be a Stranger" (Let's meet again sometime～いつか再び会いましょう～, Let's Meet Again Sometime ~Itsuka Futatabi Aimashō~)

== Chapters not in tankōbon format ==
- "Multiplication ~From the Front and From Behind~ Part 1" (Multiplication ～前から後ろから～ 前編) – Published in Jump Square on April 1, 2017. Later included in the To Love Ru Chronicle book, To Love Ru Darkness bunkoban volume 10, and To Love Ru Parade.
- "Multiplication ~From the Front and From Behind~ Part 2" (Multiplication ～前から後ろから～ 後編) – Published in Jump Square on May 1, 2017. Later included in the To Love Ru Chronicle book, To Love Ru Darkness bunkoban volume 10, and To Love Ru Parade.
- "Tokubetsu Bangai-hen" (特別番外編) – Published in Jump Square on November 4, 2017.
- "Rito and Sayaka After School " (リトと紗弥香の放課後) – Published in Weekly Shōnen Jump on April 27, 2019. Later included in To Love Ru Parade.
- "Bangai-hen" (番外編) – Published in Jump Square on May 2, 2019.
- "Tokubetsu Tomikiri: Mikan to Maruru" (特別読切 美柑とマルル) – Released on the Shōnen Jump+ website on January 13, 2023. Later included in To Love Ru Parade.
- "Rito☆Sura" (リト☆スラ) – Published in the Summer 2026 issue of Jump Giga on August 17, 2026. Later included in To Love Ru Parade.
