= List of The Eminence in Shadow episodes =

Official English logo

The Eminence in Shadow is an anime television series based on the light novel series of the same title written by Daisuke Aizawa and illustrated by Tōzai. The anime was announced on the release of the fourth light novel volume on February 26, 2021. The series is produced by Nexus and directed by Kazuya Nakanishi, with scripts written by Kanichi Katou, character designs by Makoto Iino, and music composed by Kenichiro Suehiro. It aired from October 5, 2022, to February 15, 2023, on AT-X and other networks. The opening theme was "Highest" by OxT, while the ending theme was "Darling in the Night" by Asami Seto, Inori Minase, Suzuko Mimori, Fairouz Ai, Hisako Kanemoto, Ayaka Asai, and Reina Kondō. Sentai Filmworks licensed the series for a North American release, streaming it on Hidive.

A second season was announced during a livestream on February 22, 2023, with the main staff returning from the previous season. It consists of 12 episodes, which aired from October 4 to December 20, 2023. The opening theme is "Grayscale Dominator" by OxT, while the ending theme is "Polaris in the Night" by Ikumi Hasegawa, Maaya Uchida, Mayu Minami, and Ryōko Maekawa.

== Series overview ==
Season	Episodes	Originally released	
Season	Episodes	First released	Last released
1	20	October 5, 2022	February 15, 2023
2	12	October 4, 2023	December 20, 2023

== Episodes ==
=== Season 1 (2022–23) ===
No. overall	No. in season	Title	Directed by	Written by	Storyboarded by	Original release date
1	1	"The Hated Classmate"; Transliteration: "Kirai na Kurasumeito" (Japanese: 嫌いなクラスメイト)	Kazuya Nakanishi	Kanichi Katou	Kazuya Nakanishi	October 5, 2022
Akane Nishino is a famous actress and good student who is friendly with her classmates; however, her behavior around them is a front she uses to conceal her own anger and bitterness, left behind in the wake of an incident in which a fan of hers kidnapped and molested her. She despises everyone around her, classmate Minoru Kageno in particular; he barely acknowledges her existence and seems to struggle to even remember her name. He is briefly shown to carry weights in his bag and clothing, to increase his strength. Nishino is kidnapped by criminals who intend to ransom her, but they are interrupted by Kageno, who is disguised as a masked vigilante calling himself Stylish Ruffian Slayer. The criminals refuse to take him seriously at first but quickly acknowledge him as a dangerous brawler capable of defeating whole gangs by himself, known to them as the Balaclava Berserker, when they witness him dual-wielding crowbars. Slayer defeats both men and frees Nishino, who suspects that Kageno is responsible for her rescue. A few days later, Kageno is abruptly hit by a truck and killed. Through flashback, Kageno explains that, for his entire life, he wanted to become a secret mastermind manipulating society from the shadows to protect the innocent, to be like the fictional heroes he looked up to, and relentlessly trained in martial arts in the hopes that he might one day become as powerful as to overcome a nuclear bomb. In death, Kageno laments that no matter how hard he trained or how much he tried, achieving such a level of power was functionally impossible, as the laws of physics impeded him, rendering him an ordinary human no matter what he did. Having died, Kageno finds himself reborn in an alternate world with magical powers and rededicates himself to his desire to manipulate and control society under cover of darkness as the Eminence in Shadow.
2	2	"Shadow Garden Is Born"; Transliteration: "Kessei Shadō Gāden" (Japanese: 結成シャドウガーデン)	Kazuya Nakanishi	Kanichi Katou	Kazuya Nakanishi	October 12, 2022
In this new world, Minorou Kageno is now reborn as the Cid Kagenou, the son of minor nobles of the Kingdom of Midgar, Baron and Lady Kagenou, and younger brother to a sister, Claire. In keeping with his previous life, Cid trains in secret and resumes his vigilante lifestyle by killing bandits to become the secret mastermind that he adores so much. One day, Cid discovers a living blob of rotting flesh and, after experimenting on it, succeeds in curing the curse afflicting it, returning it to its true form; an elven girl with bewitching beauty. Purely for his own amusement, Cid, in character as Eminence in Shadow, convinces the girl she is a descendant of ancient heroes who defeated a demon called Diablos, whom a Cult is seeking to resurrect. Believing his lies, the girl falls deeply in love with him and swears to devote her life to him while agreeing to form a group called Shadow Garden to resist the cult. Cid gives her the name Alpha but is secretly amused that Alpha believes his entirely-fabricated story. Three years later, Claire is abruptly kidnapped. Alpha, who has now recruited six girls (Beta, Gamma, Delta, Epsilon, Zeta, and Eta) as the Shadow Seven into Cid's service, locates Claire and confirms she was kidnapped by the Cult of Diablos. Cid is convinced the girls are merely role-playing with him, completely unaware that the cult genuinely exists, and intends for Claire to be used as Diablos' host body upon his resurrection. Cid leads the attack, under the impression he is hunting normal bandits, and most of the cultists are killed. Claire escapes during the chaos and, with no idea Cid was involved, later leaves to attend Midgar Academy as planned. Cid, still completely ignorant of what really happened, is surprised when Alpha and the other Shadows abruptly announce they are leaving.
3	3	"Fencer Ordinaire"; Transliteration: "Bonjin no Ken" (Japanese: 凡人の剣)	Daisuke Takashima	Kanichi Katou	Kazuya Nakanishi	October 19, 2022
The Seven Shadows split up to hunt the cult all over the world; Cid believes they simply grew up and tired of role-playing with him. He enrolls Midgar Academy as Claire did, where he hides his abilities and deliberately avoids standing out, choosing two extremely average boys, Skel and Po, to be his friends. As a forfeit for doing badly on a test, Cid is forced to publicly humiliate himself by offering a fake love confession to the much higher-class Alexia, a princess of Midgar; Cid plays along in his role as a "typical background character" and offers the confession, and is shocked when Princess Alexia agrees to be his girlfriend. When she invites Cid to her fencing class, he discovers Alexia is engaged to the royal fencing instructor Zenon, but she has no desire to marry him and has decided to use Cid as a tool of petty vengeance against him. Fully aware both that he is being used and of Princess Alexia's spitefulness and selfishness, Cid agrees to continue their fake relationship in exchange for money. After two weeks, Alexia admits to him that despite the effort she puts into sword training, she has never been as skilled as her sister, Iris, and was thus nicknamed "Fencer Ordinaire". Cid admits he actually likes her sword style, which focuses on mastery of the basics; this angers Alexia, who opts to end their fake relationship. The next day, Zenon reveals that Alexia has disappeared and has Cid arrested as the prime suspect in her kidnapping.
4	4	"Sadism's Rewards"; Transliteration: "Kagyaku e no Hōshū" (Japanese: 加虐への報酬)	Hazuki Mizumoto	Kunihiko Okada	Hazuki Mizumoto	October 26, 2022
Now locked in a cell next to a mutated human girl, Alexia has her blood stolen by a cult scientist, who claims that it contains demon DNA. Cid is tortured by knights for Alexia's location, but since he has trained himself to withstand pain this amount of torture is nothing for him, he pretends to be a pathetic but innocent NPC, thinking it makes him look cool. After five long days, Princess Iris orders that Cid be released. Alpha suddenly reappears to Cid, bringing news that they have continued to monitor the cult while increasing the scope of Shadow Garden's influence and power. Cid is impressed that Alpha and her fellow Shadows still occasionally visit to carry on their role-playing game with him and feels grateful for their courtesy, still very unaware of Shadow Garden's existence and power. Alpha plans to rescue Princess Alexia with 114 loyal soldiers; Cid plays along to amuse himself, knowing Princess Alexia really has been kidnapped but mistakenly believing it was the work of corrupt knights and that the 114 soldiers are just background actors Alpha hired. In a massive attack, Cid kills the knights who tortured him, while his army searches for Princess Alexia. The cult scientist desperately injects Princess Alexia's blood into the mutant girl; she becomes a demon, kills the scientist then frees Princess Alexia. While escaping, Alexia encounters Zenon, who reveals he turned her over to the cult in exchange for him being promoted to the role of a high-ranking knight. When Princess Alexia attacks him, Zenon easily defeats her, but their duel is interrupted by the sudden arrival of Cid.
5	5	"I Am..."; Transliteration: "Ai Amu......" (Japanese: アイ・アム......)	Kazuya Nakanishi	Mio Inoue	Kazuya Nakanishi	November 2, 2022
Zenon identifies Cid as the one behind recent attacks on the cult and announces himself as one of the cult's core members. The demon girl rampages through the city and fights Princess Iris. Alpha reveals herself to Iris as a member of Shadow Garden, defeats the demon with a single powerful blow then vanishes. Cid duels Zenon and dominates him; Princess Alexia, who has no idea that Shadow is Cid in disguise, is captivated by his sword style, which expresses the heart of the style she has searched for her entire life. Knowing he is outmatched by Shadow, Zenon swallows pills that turn him demonic and increase his power, but using the principles of a nuclear explosion of which he has dreamed for so long, Cid sets off a magical bomb that dissolves everything in the blast radius to atoms, utterly annihilating Zenon and destroying most of the now-evacuated city while leaving behind a huge crater. Now reunited with Iris, Princess Alexia is freshly determined to master her chosen sword style. Now that Zenon is dead, and having remembered that Cid told her he admired her sword style, she offers to be his real girlfriend; when he abruptly rejects her, she punishes him violently. Alpha returns to investigating a group that has been masquerading as Shadow Garden and committing crimes in its name, and Iris orders a kingdom-wide investigation into both the Cult of Diablos and Shadow Garden. Meanwhile, Cid, fresh off his violent encounter with Alexia, meets a scholarly girl with pink hair.
6	6	"Pretenders"; Transliteration: "Itsuwaru Mono" (Japanese: 偽る者)	Daisuke Takashima	Kanichi Katou	Daisuke Takashima	November 9, 2022
The false Shadow Garden continues committing murders. A recovered cult relic is given by Iris to the pink-haired student, Sherry, the kingdom's foremost researcher. Cid's friends Po and Skel take him to a new department store, where he discovers that his subordinate Gamma opened the store to fund Shadow Garden, with branches in every city in the world; Cid is impressed but once again remains convinced that Gamma is role-playing, unaware he now owns dozens of stores and is effectively one of the wealthiest men in the world. He also meets Nu, the newest named number of the Shadow Garden. On his way home, Cid witnesses Alexia fighting several murderers, so he saves Alexia, slaughters the murderers, and hands one survivor over to Nu for interrogation. Elsewhere, the murderer's boss, Gaunt Knight, confirms they have located the relic. Alexia confirms Shadow Garden is not really behind the murderers, though Iris still insists they are enemies of the kingdom. Cid, Po, and Skell, having bought chocolate from Cid's store, try their luck with confessing to girls: Skell's confession ends with him being punished by her fiancé, and Po's confession ends with him being arrested, and mistaken for a stalker. Cid decides to just give the remaining chocolate to anyone, which by chance is Sherry. Her adoptive father, vice-principal Ruslan, informs the naïve Sherry the chocolates were probably meant as a love confession and encourages her to decide on her answer quickly, so as to not keep Cid waiting.
7	7	"A Fencing Tournament of Intrigue & Bloodshed"; Transliteration: "Bōryaku to Ryūketsu no Kenjutsu Taikai" (Japanese: 謀略と流血の剣術大会)	Kazuya Nakanishi	Kunihiko Okada	Kazuya Nakanishi	November 16, 2022
Nu informs Cid the murderer she interrogated was a typical Cult foot soldier, an orphan brainwashed with drugs and magic. One such soldier, Rex, is in the city on a Cult mission. During their conversation, Cid is preoccupied, as Skel and Po have entered him into the academy's sword tournament to impress girls; Nu mistakenly thinks Cid's rambling about the festival is him plotting to deal with Rex. At the festival, Cid duels student president Rose, a princess of the neighboring kingdom of Oriana; while still role-playing as a secret hero and keeping his skills hidden, he feigns injury repeatedly but persists in the fight, rising to his feet again after each of her attacks. The referee eventually declares Rose victor, but she is impressed at Cid's fighting spirit. Sherry asks Cid to be friends before they consider dating, though Cid has completely forgotten who Sherry is and decides to just avoid her. Sherry asks Princess Alexia about her relationship with Cid and is happy when Alexia reveals their relationship is fake, though Princess Alexia is privately upset another girl is interested in Cid. An election is announced to fill an empty student council seat. Gaunt Knight erects an anti-magic barrier, allowing the fake Shadow Garden to capture the academy. When Cid and Rose's classroom is attacked, Rose attempts to fight, but is much weaker without her magic; Cid recklessly rushes in to save her and is severely wounded.
8	8	"Dark Knight Academy Under Attack"; Transliteration: "Nerawareta Makenshi Gakuen" (Japanese: 狙われた魔剣士学園)	Daisuke Takashima	Mio Inoue	Daisuke Takashima	November 23, 2022
Cid reveals that he was excited by the chance to look cool fighting terrorists, and saved Rose merely to appear heroic; Rose, meanwhile, mistakenly believes Cid sacrificed himself out of love for her. After the students are taken to the auditorium, leaving Cid's body in the classroom, Cid secretly revives and heals himself. Rex attacks Sherry to retrieve the relic, but Iris' Crimson Knights help her escape. Cid, who is also killing terrorists, reunites with and saves Sherry. Sherry identifies the relic generating the barrier as the Eye of Avarice, which absorbs magic and explodes once full. Cid deduces the cult are using the Eye to kill the students and prevent them from becoming knights and obstructing their plans. The relic Sherry has been researching is the Eye's control unit, which she hopes can be used to stop the explosion. Since Sherry needs tools from her room, Cid volunteers to get them for her. Rex warns Gaunt Knight that someone is killing their men, and Gaunt Knight suspects that the real Shadow Garden is responsible. It is revealed Gaunt Knight's true goal is to be reinstated to the Knights of Round. Nu sees the sole surviving Crimson Knight is her former fiancé Marco; while tempted to kill him, she decides to let him live. Cid orders Nu and her fellow Shadows not to attack the terrorists until Sherry has the control relic ready.
9	9	"The End of a Lie"; Transliteration: "Itsuwari no Hate" (Japanese: 偽りの果て)	Kazuya Nakanishi	Kanichi Katou	Kazuya Nakanishi	November 30, 2022
Sherry activates the control relic, deactivating the Eye and its barrier. Cid arrives disguised as Eminence in Shadow, and Shadow Garden begins slaughtering the terrorists. Iris, believing that Shadow Garden is responsible for the attack, is enraged by their appearance. Cid finds Gaunt Knight burning Sherry's research and reveals he is Ruslan, Sherry's adoptive father. Ruslan explains he was once a master swordsman until an illness weakened him. Believing the Eye might cure him, he cultivated a relationship with the woman studying it, Sherry's mother. When she grew too afraid to continue her research, Ruslan killed her and adopted Sherry as a pawn to facilitate the research's completion. Ruslan combines the Eye with the control relic and regains his lost sword skills; he and Cid fight, revealing that even with his abilities restored, Ruslan's swordsmanship is still inferior to Cid's. Ruslan brags he has framed Shadow Garden for all his crimes; Cid, unconcerned by this, kills Ruslan, an act inadvertently witnessed by Sherry. In the wake of the attack, the kingdom designates Shadow Garden as a terrorist organization. Sherry informs Cid that, with Ruslan dead, she has decided to transfer to a scientific research academy to pursue her new goal, though she will miss him. When Cid asks what her new goal is, she insists on keeping it a secret, but the dark aura surrounding her words suggests her new goal is sinister.
10	10	"The Sacred Land, City of Deception"; Transliteration: "Seichi Giman no Miyako" (Japanese: 聖地・欺瞞の都)	Daisuke Takashima	Kunihiko Okada	Daisuke Takashima	December 7, 2022
Cid is contacted by Alpha, who requests he visit the sacred city of Lindwurm. Beta, Epsilon, and Nu also receive a mission from Alpha. While in Lindwurm to attend the upcoming Goddess Trial, Alexia and Iris visit Cid's department store, where Alexia, planning to try to seduce Cid, purchases thong underwear. A flashback shows that after defeating Ruslan, Cid pretended to have miraculously survived the injury he received while rescuing Rose. Rose, who has sworn to accept what she perceives as his feelings toward her by becoming his lover, hopes that her father might allow them to marry if Cid wins the Trials. Cid mistakenly believes she is trying to convert him to worship the goddess Beatrix, who empowered three legendary warriors and the worship of whom is the dominant religion of Lindwurm. Though he is reluctant to have her along with him on the trip, he opts to avoid her attempts to seduce him rather than actively push her away. In Lindwurm, Cid sees Beta in her persona as the popular author Natsume, who became famous by publishing stories he told her from his past life's world, such as Cinderella, Romeo and Juliet and Star Wars. Beta passes Cid his mission briefing, coded in an ancient language. Rose misinterprets Cid's enthusiasm as a passion for history and languages, though Cid is really just impressed at what he thinks is Beta's latest role-playing event for him. A cultist murders Archbishop Drake of Beatrix's Church, and while Epsilon kills one of his men, the murderer escapes.
11	11	"The Goddess's Trial"; Transliteration: "Megami no Shiren" (Japanese: 女神の試練)	Daisuke Takashima	Mio Inoue	Kazuya Nakanishi	December 14, 2022
Cid visits a hot spring and happens to meet Alexia in one of the baths. Hiding her embarrassment, Alexia explains the nature of the Goddess Trial: challengers will summon and duel the spirits of famous warriors, with the strength of the challenger directly related to the strength of the summoned spirit. Since she is busy dealing with the Archbishop's murder, Alexia asks Cid to assist her by joining the Crimson Knights; Cid refuses and nonchalantly leaves, fully exposing himself to the intrigued Alexia as he goes. Soon after, Alexia's investigation is canceled by the interim Archbishop Nelson, whom Alexia holds to be the prime suspect in Drake's murder. Princess Alexia encounters Beta in her Natsume persona, and both take an instant dislike to each other. At the Trial, many fighters are humiliated when no famous warriors manifest to duel them, implying they are unworthy opponents. Cid is suddenly announced as the next challenger, his entry fee having been secretly paid by Rose to show her father Cid's potential. To avoid exposing his strength or embarrassing himself by faking a humiliating defeat, Cid crashes the Trial as the Eminence in Shadow, his presence summoning Aurora, the Calamity Witch whom, according to Nelson, was the strongest witch in history. Witnessing Aurora's manifestation, Princess Alexia realizes that it is possible that Eminence is the most dangerous man in the world. Cid defeats Aurora, but finding himself disappointed that the duel was too easy, he leaves. The arena barrier suddenly collapses, and a new summoning spell activates in response to Cid's actions, causing a summoning portal to begin following him, impressing the observing Shadow Garden.
12	12	"The Truth Within the Memories"; Transliteration: "Kioku no Naka no Shinjitsu" (Japanese: 記憶の中の真実)	Kazuya Nakanishi	Kanichi Katou	Kazuya Nakanishi	December 21, 2022
Alpha reveals she is an elf and a descendant of Olivier, the hero who severed Diablos' left arm one thousand years ago. Cid decides to enter the summoning circle following him and disappears within it, finding himself within the Sanctuary. Alpha appears with the rest of Shadow Garden; after they kidnap Nelson, they enter the Sanctuary as well, as do Princess Alexia and Rose. Cid meets an imprisoned Aurora, who has been trapped for a thousand years; after Cid frees her, she reveals that the Sanctuary is actually a massive prison that stores the memories of every past hero. If they destroy Sanctuary's magical core, Aurora and the other memories will be deleted. As they pass through memories, Cid and the Shadows learn the cult formerly used the Sanctuary to experiment on orphan girls with Diablos' blood in an effort to resurrect him. Most of the subjects died, but some, like Olivier, became strong heroes. It is revealed experiments on Diablos' arm produced the pills that turn people demonic, and also that, once a year, it produces twelve Beads that grant one year of immortality to the cult's twelve leaders, the Knights of Round, one of whom is Nelson, who helped create the first Beads one millennium ago. Nelson turns demonic and, with his control over the Sanctuary, scatters everyone through multiple memories and creates copies of himself to fight all the Shadows at once.
13	13	"A Bloody Showdown as an Offering to Annihilation"; Transliteration: "Shōmetsu ni Sasageru Kettō" (Japanese: 消滅に捧げる血闘)	Daisuke Takashima	Kunihiko Okada	Daisuke Takashima	December 28, 2022
Epsilon reveals she and the named Shadows were personally brought into Shadow Garden by Cid were all girls experimented on by the Cult; Cid cured them of the demonic/cursed side effects, leaving their strength intact. They enter Sanctuary's archive and steal the records of the Cult's experiments. Delta reveals she possesses berserker-level strength, allowing her to kill hundreds of Nelson's copies without any magic. Meanwhile, Cid and Aurora reach Sanctuary's core. The core is sealed behind chains that can only be cut by a nearby magic sword, and though Cid tries, the sword can only be drawn by a hero's descendant. Nelson summons Olivier to fight for him, but Epsilon appears with all the Cult's research, and all the Shadows abruptly teleport out of the Sanctuary with Alexia and Rose, leaving the confused Nelson behind. As Cid is still within the Sanctuary, Nelson orders Olivier to kill him. They duel, but Cid is disappointed by Olivier's mindless, empty obedience, mute and without personality, and as such finds the fight boring. Aurora decides to protect him as payment for producing her first new memories in a millennium. Cid is annoyed at her assumption that he will lose, claiming he has been paying close attention and has discovered a secret of the Sanctuary. Olivier then stabs Cid through the heart, but he smiles and reveals one of his eyes has changed color.
14	14	"Your Lie, Your Wish"; Transliteration: "Kimi no Uso, Kimi no Negai" (Japanese: 君の嘘、君の願い)	Kazuya Nakanishi	Mio Inoue	Kazuya Nakanishi	January 4, 2023
Cid grabs Olivier and bites her coronoid arteries to kill her, revealing to a stunned Nelson he allowed Olivier to stab him in a way in which she missed his organs. He also reveals the secret he figured out: the Sanctuary absorbs magic from the air, so by compressing the whole of his magic into a solid mass within his eye, he can use his magic again. Cid sets off his atomic bomb spell, destroying Nelson and the Sanctuary core. Cid bids farewell to Aurora, who kisses him and offers him the hope that one day he might find the real Aurora. Princess Alexia and Rose decide they must form their own secret organization to stand against both the Cult and Shadow Garden. As Natsume, Beta agrees to help so she can spy on them. Alpha discovers from the Sanctuary's archives that Aurora's true identity is that of the demon Diabolos. Elsewhere, Shadow Garden begins buying all the property in the city of Madlid to open another shopping center, though secretly it is to gain access to a valuable oil field. Alexia confirms the Beatrix church is involved with the Cult, but politics prevents her from investigating further, so Iris decides to rise further up the ranks of the Crimson Knights to gain her own political power, starting with winning the upcoming Bushin Festival tournament. Rose discovers she may be infected with demonic blood.
15	15	"The Strongest Weakest Man"; Transliteration: "Saikyō Saijaku no Otoko" (Japanese: 最強最弱の男)	Daisuke Takashima	Kanichi Katou	Susumu Nishizawa	January 11, 2023
The Bushin Festival arrives, attracting hundreds of fighters to the royal capital; Cid plans to shock the crowd by disguising himself as weak and defeating everyone he fights with astonishing ease. Using magical slime makeup, Gamma gives Cid the pathetic face of Mundane Mann, an unskilled knight who died in poverty. Annerose, a foreign knight who fought at the Goddess Trial, witnesses the disguised Cid allowing himself to be beaten by a fighter named Quinton in an encounter on a street before the festival's beginning and is amazed that Cid is uninjured. Cid learns the favorites to win the festival are Iris, Rose, Annerose, Quinton and a mysterious, nameless Dark Knight. Rose encounters Cid and informs him that her father has selected a man named Perv Asshat to become her fiancé and force her to give up the sword. Cid advises that she relax and do what makes her happy for once. During the preliminary fights Goldy Gilded, a skilled but annoyingly arrogant knight, advises Skel on how to identify warriors most likely to win and is disappointed when Cid, as Mundane, wins a fight against his prediction without moving. Only the watchful Annerose notices that Mundane moved so fast that he defeated his opponent before the fight even began. Goldy announces that Mundane's victory has made him Goldy's next opponent. The next morning, it is announced that Rose has stabbed Perv and subsequently disappeared.
16	16	"Unseen Intentions"; Transliteration: "Miezaru Shin'i" (Japanese: 見えざる真意)	Yoshinobu Tokumoto	Kunihiko Okada	Yoshinobu Tokumoto	January 18, 2023
Rose's escape makes her appear guilty, which has dire consequences for inter-kingdom politics. Alexia decides to find and protect her, but Beta stalls her from interfering, already well aware that Rose is hiding in the city's labyrinthine underground ruins. Cid meets an elf named Beatrix who is searching for her missing niece and happens to greatly resemble Alpha but refrains from telling her that he saw an elf who looks like her. As Mundane, Cid faces Goldy for his first duel, watched by Annerose and Quinton, both of whom are now suspicious of Mundane's abilities. To their great confusion, Mundane dodges Goldy's first attack by flexing his neck, and then causes Goldy's own magic attack to explode backward on him by sneezing, knocking Goldy unconscious and causing his defeat. Despite his unusual methods, Annerose doubts even she could copy Mundane's movements. While meeting with Perv Asshat, Iris discovers Rose didn't injure him at all and observes that he has a sinister influence over Rose's father, the King. Mundane defeats Quinton, making Annerose his opponent the next day. Annerose attempts to intimidate him, until Mundane reveals he wears armor weighing over a ton and yet still moves too fast for people to follow his true movements. Rose continues to evade the soldiers sent after her.
17	17	"Moonlight That Pierces the Darkness"; Transliteration: "Yami ni Sasu Gekkō" (Japanese: 闇に射す月光)	Daisuke Takashima	Mio Inoue	Susumu Nishizawa	January 25, 2023
Cid's elder sister Claire visits, but he avoids her by pretending to join Skel in hunting Rose for a sizable reward. Cid actually respects Rose for risking everything to escape an unwanted marriage. Cid overhears the Moonlight Sonata, a personal favorite musical piece of his for its brooding tone, being played on a nearby piano and quickly finds Epsilon is the one performing it. She explains she has been able to cultivate useful connections in the Oriana Kingdom by posing as a skilled pianist. Alexia and Beta suspect Rose fled after discovering that Perv is secretly a cultist using magic to brainwash and render the king an invalid, and they enter the underground ruins to find her. Rose, now suffering more seriously from her infected blood, considers surrendering to avoid dragging Oriana into a war. She suddenly hears the Sonata and finds Shadow playing a piano, which he has stolen from where Epsilon was playing it earlier, in a cavernous underground room. She realizes she cannot surrender, so Eminence cures her blood infection and grants her power before vanishing. Cult soldiers locate Rose, but she kills them and decides to end her partnership with Alexia and Beta to fight alone, refusing to drag them into her problems. Alexia is not pleased by this and she ends up fighting her. Rose defeats her and apologizes to Beta, but she tells her to go do what she must and won't stop her. Beta guesses this was Cid's goal all along; Cid, meanwhile, is simply pleased he was able to pull off the dramatic moment of broodingly playing piano underground to impress Rose. He returns home and finds that an angry Claire has been waiting all day for his return.
18	18	"Betting on a Moment"; Transliteration: "Setsuna ni Kakeru" (Japanese: 刹那に賭ける)	Yoshinobu Tokumoto	Kunihiko Okada	Yoshinobu Tokumoto	February 1, 2023
After sadistically punishing Cid for neglecting her, Claire reveals she has replaced the still-absent Rose in the festival and insists Cid watch her from VIP seating. Cid sits beside Iris, who apologizes for the Zenon incident. They discuss the dark knight competitor, Beatrix the Elvish War Goddess, the festival's very first champion, and Cid realizes Beatrix is Alpha's aunt. Cid sneaks away to don his Mundane disguise to duel Annerose. Perv takes his seat beside Iris, who despises him; he expresses confidence that Rose will return and marry him. He also suggests he is interested in hiring strong warriors, particularly Annerose. In the arena, Annerose attempts to match Mundane's speed, but is defeated. This redoubles Princess Iris's determination to defeat Mundane in the next match. Perv has Mundane investigated, though he is confident he has no connection to the all-female Shadow Garden. Annerose thanks Mundane for showing her she still has room to improve and invites him to work for her country's government, but he refuses. Cid looks forward to defeating Iris so he can become a legend by mysteriously disappearing immediately after his victory. Claire meets him in his room, quietly reminding him he forgot to watch her match.
19	19	"Dancing Puppet"; Transliteration: "Odoru Ningyō" (Japanese: 踊る人形)	Daisuke Takashima	Mio Inoue	Kazuya Nakanishi	February 8, 2023
Cid sits beside Princess Iris and Beatrix to watch Claire's next match. Perv continues drugging the King, hoping Rose will try to save him. He also plans to have the king publicly assassinate Iris and Princess Alexia's father, the King of Midgar, to cause war. Claire wins her match and furiously searches for Cid, who is again absent from the audience. Iris duels Mundane, but has repeated terrifying premonitions of Mundane killing her instantly with a single counterattack; Mundane shortly disarms and defeats her in a single move. Rose infiltrates the VIP area with help from Shadow Garden and Perv is enraged when she kills her own father, who shows gratitude at being freed from Perv's control at last. Rose moves to kill herself but Mundane stops her, leaping from the arena floor in a single bound to burst into the VIP box, kill Perv's men, and shed his disguise to reveal he is the Eminence in Shadow. Rose realizes Shadow is also the boy she once knew as "Stylish Bandit Slayer", revealing that when Cid was training himself as a child he killed the bandits who coincidentally had just kidnapped her, an encounter which inspired Rose to learn swordsmanship in the first place. Realizing she can't die yet, Rose again escapes. Beatrix, having longed to fight "Mundane" since their meeting, realizes that Shadow is a wanted terrorist and engages him in a duel.
20	20	"Advent of the Demon"; Transliteration: "Majin Kōrin" (Japanese: 魔人降臨)	Kazuya Nakanishi	Kanichi Katou	Kazuya Nakanishi	February 15, 2023
Alpha meets Rose and offers her membership in Shadow Garden, which Rose accepts. Amidst Beatrix' and Shadow's duel, Princess Iris joins the former in combat against him. After a fight that comes to span much of the city, Shadow again brandishes his atomic, city-obliterating attack, terrifying both Iris and Beatrix, but vanishes at the last second before its detonation, leaving Princess Iris enraged, frustrated, and more determined than ever to take her vengeance. Perv is forced to beg his master's forgiveness for his failure. Beatrix leaves the capital sad that she failed to find her niece. Holed up in her room, now filled with wanted posters of the Eminence, a mentally unraveling Sherry hears the news of his attack and renews her promise to herself to one day kill him. With the Eminence revealed to the world, Shadow Garden begins preparations to support Cid further, hoping he will soon take a more active role in running their organization. Alpha guides Rose into the monster-infested mountains near Cid and Claire's childhood village, revealing the mountains contain the old Kingdom of Alexandria, now Shadow Garden's new secret base of operations. There, a distraught Rose has everything taken from her – her name, her clothes, and the last memento she has of Cid as she knew him. Now clothed in the characteristic slime suit of Shadow Garden's operatives, she becomes Soldier 666 in their army and begins training to prove her abilities and skill to them, under their supervision. Meanwhile, Cid lingers briefly in the underground of the capital, playing the Moonlight Sonata on the stolen piano. Pleased by the quality of his role-playing with Princess Iris and Lady Beatrix, he expresses his anticipation for the games to come.

=== Season 2 (2023) ===
No. overall	No. in season	Title	Directed by	Animation directed by	Original release date
21	1	"The Lawless City"; Transliteration: "Muhō Toshi" (Japanese: 無法都市)	Kazuya Nakanishi	Daichi Kitahara	October 4, 2023
Shadow Garden informs Cid that large amounts of money have been flowing to Lawless City, a crime-infested slum that belongs to no kingdom. This coincides with the Red Moon heralding the return of the vampiric Elizabeth the Crimson Blood Queen, one of Lawless City's three rulers. Cid decides to investigate since he was going to Lawless City anyway. Goldy and Quinton approach Elizabeth's tower and are confronted by White Devil, a notorious murderer enslaved as Elizabeth's guard dog. Cid is shown visiting Lawless City with Claire, who had been sent by the Dark Knight Association to slay vampires, and dragged Cid with her. They pass Goldy and Quinton, beaten and sold to a slaver. The city's vampires send their ghoul servants to destroy the city. Cid is "saved" by Mary the Ancient Vampire Hunter and is excited to meet the newest character in his role-playing game. Skel and Po are also attacked by ghouls, having visited the city hoping to lose their virginities to prostitutes. As Shadow, Cid saves a prostitute named Marie. Claire encounters Mary and after some confusion regarding Cid's description, believes he was taken as a sacrifice to awaken Elizabeth. Cid rescues the surviving Dark Knights, the rest having deserted from fear of the ghouls. The city's other rulers, Yukime the White Fox Spirit and Juggernaut the Black Tyrant attack each other but are interrupted by Cid.
22	2	"The Haven"; Transliteration: "Ansoku no Chi" (Japanese: 安息の地)	Daisuke Takashima	Usaku Myouchin	October 11, 2023
Juggernaut and Yukime ignore Cid to break into Elizabeth's tower. White Devil attacks Cid but is cut to pieces. Beta encounters Claire and Mary and reveals Shadow Garden intends to steal Elizabeth's blood for research. Soldier 666 panics to hear of Cid's supposed kidnapping and is reprimanded by Beta. Juggernaut almost kills Mary who 'kisses' Claire to drink her blood, healing herself. Claire realizes Mary is a vampire. Cid drops Juggernaut off the tower, making Claire confused as to why "Shadow" would save them. Mary reveals one thousand years ago, Queen Elizabeth sought peace by helping vampires give up drinking blood. This enabled vampires to walk in the sun and build a community alongside humans she called the Haven. As a Progenitor Vampire, Queen Elizabeth's desire for blood never diminished, and during the Red Moon 1000 years ago she went mad and slaughtered everyone in Haven. Filled with remorse she committed suicide but before Mary could hide her body it was stolen by Lord Crimson who has secretly ruled from Elizabeth's throne ever since. Feeling sympathy Claire reveals she is possessed by a demon and is desperate to help Cid achieve greatness before she loses her humanity. Cid plunders Crimson's treasury for retirement funds and decides he might as well kill Crimson to impress everyone. Crimson, in the middle of resurrecting Elizabeth to marry her, is killed before he even notices Cid is there.
23	3	"The Hour of Awakening"; Transliteration: "Kakusei no Toki" (Japanese: 覚醒の刻)	Kazuya Nakanishi	Usaku Myouchin, Daichi Kitahara	October 18, 2023
Claire and Mary arrive after Cid leaves and Claire is attacked by the awakening Elizabeth. Shadow Garden rescues Claire. Even half asleep Elizabeth is formidable, the arrival of Yukime and Juggernaut not slowing her down. Elizabeth takes control of the demon blood dormant in all Shadow Garden. Claire, possessing higher amounts of demon blood, goes berserk. She awakens in a dream world where Aurora the Calamity Witch explains that despite "Shadow" curing her demonic possession years ago the remaining demon blood continues to evolve into something yet unknown. Aurora takes possession of Claire and attempts to use Cid's Atomic spell against Queen Elizabeth but fails as Claire's body can't handle the power. Aurora disappears just as Cid appears and battles Queen Elizabeth. Beta is overjoyed Cid protects them, not realizing he is actually protecting the coins he dropped during his dramatic arrival. Impressed, Elizabeth asks his name. Rather than answer Cid detonates his Recovery Atomic, returning the ghouls in the city to humans, healing the injured, and knocking Elizabeth unconscious. The crisis is over everyone returns home. Claire is determined to master her blood and Cid promises to always support her, for which she is grateful. She also can't help feeling she knows Shadow from somewhere. Cid is disappointed he only rescued 500 gold coins but reasons if he ever needs more he can just return to Lawless City to steal more. Later, Cid meets Yukime in secret.
24	4	"Mask of Falsehood"; Transliteration: "Itsuwari no Kamen" (Japanese: 偽りの仮面)	Daisuke Takashima	Da Li Chen	October 25, 2023
Garter, President of Major Corporate Alliance (MCA) who controls trade in Midgar via organized crime, goes to war with Mitsugoshi, a Shadow Garden fashion company. Alpha hopes killing Garter's thugs will force Cultists within MCA to reveal themselves. Cid deduces Shadow Garden owns Mitsugoshi and makes new enemies without telling him. Believing Shadow Garden may be going too far Cid arranges the secret meeting with Yukime to discuss putting Mitsugoshi and Garter out of business as a warning to Shadow Garden, whilst making vast profits for himself and Yukime. Yukime warns Cid of Garter's boss, Devil Swordsman Gettan, whom Yukime wants to kill personally. Cid discovers MCA and Mitsugoshi own competing banks so he proposes they counterfeit a fortune in fake bills. Yukime knows this would destroy public trust in banknotes and cause a bank run of people withdrawing their gold, destroying both banks and allowing Cid and Yukime to make even more profits. She congratulates Cid for knowing this; in reality, Cid is completely confused but bluffs his way through. Delta visits Cid whilst hunting MCA thugs. Gettan sends his assassins the Four Clovers to attack Mitsugoshi. One Clover is Zabra, Delta's brother. She kills him anyway since she has over 1000 additional siblings. Cid is fascinated by Therianthrope society and considers visiting Delta's clan until she enthusiastically demands he kill her father, become chief, and have strong babies with every female. Gettan begins to understand why his Cultist allies warned him Mitsugoshi was dangerous.
25	5	"He Who Pulls the Strings"; Transliteration: "Ito o Hiku Mono" (Japanese: 糸を引く者)	Kazuya Nakanishi	Usaku Myouchin	November 1, 2023
The Clovers are sent to Mitsugoshi to kill the CEO Luna, Gamma's public alias, but the clumsy Gamma insists on dealing with them herself. Gamma turns out to have unusually high amounts of magic and is resistant to physical damage, so while her combat abilities are below even an amateur she bulldozes her way through the fight, killing the leader Clover Leaf One. Gettan decides to act himself, determined to attain the power needed for revenge on the boy who scarred his face years ago, Stylish Bandit Slayer, aka the younger Cid. Yukime prints millions of fake banknotes and feeds them into the economy via Lawless City. She reveals to Cid that Gettan killed her family. Alpha discovers the counterfeit money and orders Shadow Garden to investigate the source. Gettan discovers this as well and is angered as he had the same counterfeiting idea to cause a bank run, but it was not supposed to happen until he had bled the economy of all its gold for the Cult. Should a bank run occur now the gold will be returned to the citizens and impossible for the Cult to retrieve. While investigating the carriages from the Lawless City, No. 666 falls into a trap set by Cid, aka "John Smith", who cryptically warns her it is too early for Shadow Garden to discover the truth. Unaware it was Cid, No. 666 cannot believe she lost another fight and curses her own weakness.
26	6	"John Smith"; Transliteration: "Jon Sumisu" (Japanese: ジョン・スミス)	Daisuke Takashima	Daichi Kitahara	November 8, 2023
Alpha sends Delta to hunt "John Smith" but Delta realizes "John Smith" is Cid from his scent. Cid claims he is undercover and then temporarily gets rid of Delta by sending her to hunt Juggernaut. Delta's absence causes Alpha to assume "John Smith" killed her. Alpha and Gettan independently realize "John Smith" is planning a bank run. Beta tries to report the financial crisis to Cid and mistakenly believes it angers him; really Cid is just baffled by her financial jargon. Beta is relieved when Cid assures her Delta is alive. Alpha attempts to assassinate "John Smith" but realizes he is none other than her savior and master. Confused that Cid has been working to undermine his own organization, Alpha nonetheless fights to prove she can still be of use to his secret plans. Cid defeats her and announces he is temporarily leaving Shadow Garden until his plans are complete, leaving Alpha heartbroken. Yukime finishes swapping fake notes for gold from both banks, leaving them bankrupt. Yukime reveals to Cid, Gettan was once her fiancé to secure an alliance between her fox clan and his wolf clan. Gettan's desire for power drove him to join the Cult, and when the foxes refused to follow him he killed them all and left Yukime half dead. Alone, she spent years accumulating enough power to rule one-third of Lawless City. Now thanks to Cid the MCA is nearing collapse and Gettan is finally vulnerable enough for her to personally confront him.
27	7	"Something Precious"; Transliteration: "Taisetsu na Mono" (Japanese: 大切なもの)	Kazuya Nakanishi	Da Li Chen	November 15, 2023
Evidence surfaces that Gettan had made his own fake banknotes for the cult to undermine Mitsugoshi, giving Alpha hope Cid only created his fake banknotes to undermine the cult first. This is confirmed by a coded letter from Cid explaining his motives and the location of the gold, which Alpha retrieves for Shadow Garden. Delta returns. Cid is relieved everything worked out but is then stunned to find the gold gone; having never imagined Shadow Garden would decode his dramatic coded letter, and mistakenly decides Gettan has stolen his gold. Yukime defeats Gettan in a duel but lets him live. Gettan swallows a demonic pill and stabs Yukime in the back but is defeated by "John Smith" searching for his gold, though his poor word choice makes it sound like he loves Yukime. Gettan recognizes him as "Stylish Bandit Slayer" who scarred his face the night he killed Yukime's family, causing Yukime to realize it was "Stylish Bandit Slayer" aka young Cid, who unintentionally saved her life that night, so she falls in love with him. Before dying Gettan entrusts Yukime to "John Smith". Alpha reveals Shadow Garden to Yukime and proposes an alliance which Yukime accepts to be close to Cid. Cid, having misunderstood Gettan's last words, spends weeks digging the field where Gettan died looking for the gold, assisted by Delta. In the end, Cid quits digging and decides to disappear for a while until Shadow Garden are less upset by his betrayal. After he vanishes Delta accidentally digs up something of value.
28	8	"The Dragon's Tears"; Transliteration: "Ryū no Namida" (Japanese: 龍の涙)	Daisuke Takashima	Usaku Myouchin, Daichi Kitahara	November 22, 2023
Skel and Po break into Cid's room and steal six tickets to a Mitsugoshi hot springs resort. Unfortunately, as the tickets were personal gifts to Cid Shadow Garden interrogates Skel and Po and mistakenly concludes Cid has invited Skel, Po, and three of the Shadows to the hot springs for a mission posing as three romantic couples. Eta, having built the resort after hearing a story from Cid of a legendary dragon and a princess, concludes there is a secret meaning to the story. The three Shadows chosen for the couples are Beta, Zeta, and Delta while the other Shadows attend as normal guests. Terrified, Skel and Po lie by claiming Cid is running late and will join them later. After some time the girls start to wonder if the mission was just Cid's way of giving everyone a holiday. Skel and Po are caught spying and punished, but their tears cause a magical reaction in the spring water. As the original dragon legend called for a princess tear Eta torments Beta, a "self-proclaimed elven princess", until she cries, turning the spring water into a dragon. The Shadows defeat the dragon and Eta confirms the hot spring now possesses magic that promotes health and beauty. Alpha is convinced Cid sent them to free the tormented soul of the dragon from the story and have a little fun along the way. Skel and Po return home still determined to one day lose their virginities.
29	9	"The Key"; Transliteration: "Kagi" (Japanese: 鍵)	Daisuke Takashima	Usaku Myouchin	November 29, 2023
Cid stays at an inn owned by Marie, the former prostitute from Lawless City. 666, 665, and 664 meet 559 to spy on supporters of Perv Asshat. They witness Queen Reina, 666's mother, use her royal blood to open a chamber and reveal the Ring of Succession, which is taken by cult officer Kouadoi. 559 tries to assassinate Reina but 666 stops her. 559 declares 666 a traitor and attacks Kouadoi. 666 returns to Oriana with Reina and resumes her old life as Rose. Cid mistakenly believes Rose was always plotting to become queen after killing her father and decides to wait until she becomes a tyrant so he can heroically defeat her. Perv's soldiers extort Marie for fake taxes, so Cid secretly kills them and takes their gold which, as Lord Shadow, he gives to Marie. Marie is glad she doesn't have to return to prostitution and is eternally grateful to Shadow. Meanwhile, after three days and three nights of fighting Kouadoi and his soldiers, 665, 664, and 559 are rescued by Cid and Kouadoi is killed. 559 reports Rose's treason and loss of the ring. Cid, who wasn't actually listening, spots a newspaper announcing Rose is engaged to Perv. As this doesn't follow the tyrant queen scenario he hoped for, Cid loses his temper, which 559 mistakes as rage over being betrayed. Cid flies directly to Oriana to somehow make Rose want to be a tyrannical queen.
30	10	"Caged Bird"; Transliteration: "Kago no Tori" (Japanese: 籠の鳥)	Daisuke Takashima	Daichi Kitahara	December 6, 2023
Lambda, aka 11, believes she should kill Rose but relents after Cid decides to visit Rose himself. Epsilon, as famous musician Shiron, can escort Cid into the palace as her student. Perv demands Cid perform a song to prove he is Shiron's student. Cid dazzles the nobles with a performance of Moonlight Sonata while using magic to sneakily rob them of money and jewelry, including the Ring of Succession from Perv's pocket he mistakenly assumes to be Rose's ring for the wedding. Rose's maid, Margaret, attempts to lure Cid into becoming her father's personal musician in exchange for Rose's location. After escaping her, Cid enters Rose's room. Unaware Cid from the academy is also Lord Shadow, whom she had worked for briefly, Princess Rose is glad to see Cid whom she still loves. Despite his plea, she resumes her old dedication to the sword (hopefully restarting her journey to tyrant queen), she refuses and asks him to forget about her as she still intends to marry Perv. Cid later overhears Perv threatening to kill Reina unless Rose continues to obey him. Epsilon and Lambda are confused Cid didn't punish Rose, but decides he must be preoccupied with the missing ring, which controls the weapon Black Rose that could destroy Oriana Kingdom with one attack. Perv reports to his superior Mordred he will soon control Black Rose, completely unaware the ring box in his pocket is empty. It is also revealed Perv is having an affair with a willing Queen Reina.
31	11	"Determination"; Transliteration: "Ketsudan" (Japanese: 決断)	Kazuya Nakanishi	Da Li Chen	December 13, 2023
Shadow Garden infiltrates a cult facility seeking another relic but finds it already gone. Cid plans to rescue Reina for Rose but overhears Perv and Reina plotting to kill Rose after the wedding, also revealing the latter was working with the Cult the entire time. As Shadow, Cid shows Rose that Reina is having sex with Perv and plotting Rose's death, hoping her rage will inspire her tyrant bloodlust. Instead, she loses all hope as she believes that everything she did for her kingdom was for nothing. However Cid, as himself, coerces Rose into deciding what she wants to do, then accidentally leaves the ring behind. Rose assumes the ring is some sort of cryptic gift. Perv reveals to gain control over the ring he must marry Rose to transfer its magic to himself, just as he discovers the ring missing, which he desperately hides from Mordred. At the wedding Rose publicly refuses to marry Perv and puts on the ring believing it will give her powers; instead, it unlocks a video recording of her father from before the poison broke his mind, accusing Perv of treason and conspiring with the cult, then implores the public to trust Rose as their next queen. The public cheers as Rose calls for Perv's arrest for treason against the crown, but Perv and Queen Reina are both abruptly beheaded by Mordred who possesses the missing relic. Its proximity to the ring allows him to activate the Black Rose and summon Archdemon Ragnarok to destroy all of Oriana. Mordred is stunned when, in his moment of victory, Cid appears as Lord Shadow and casually severs Ragnarok's arm.
32	12	"Highest"	Kazuya Nakanishi	Usaku Myouchin	December 20, 2023
Ragnarok heals itself. Most of the wedding guests reveal themselves as Shadow Garden. Mordred duels Epsilon and Beta and is shocked when his legendary sword skills are exposed as nothing more than an ancient magical sword stolen from the elves. After defeating him Mordred tells them everything. The cult is aware of alternate dimensions that orbit each other like a solar system. Every few millennia dimensions collide and temporarily fuse. This resulted in both magic and humans arriving in this dimension. Demons also come from other dimensions and it was the cult experimenting on them that resulted in the creation of Diabolos from a human test subject. They also created Black Rose, an artificial gateway to other dimensions. Cid, bored from the uninteresting "boss fight", easily kills Ragnarok. Mordred goes mad and turns demonic, so Cid kills him with an atomic explosion so large it covers the whole planet in light. Unintentionally, it collapses Black Rose, sucking Cid inside and leaving Shadow Garden dumbfounded. In Japan, now a war-torn wasteland since demons entered their dimension, Akane Nishino has matured since Cid rescued her and is now a knight known as Savior. She is kidnapped by cybernetically enhanced thugs working for one of her enemies and is almost killed, until Cid appears and rescues her, once again calling himself Lord Shadow.
