= The Eminence in Shadow: Lost Echoes =

- Original title: Kage no Jitsuryokusha ni Naritakute!: Zankyō-hen
- Directed by: Kazuya Nakanishi
- Written by: Kanichi Katō
- Screenplay by: Kanichi Katō
- Based on: The Eminence in Shadow by Daisuke Aizawa
- Production company: Nexus
- Distributed by: Kadokawa Animation
- Release date: 2027
- Country: Japan
- Language: Japanese

The Eminence in Shadow: Lost Echoes (劇場版 陰の実力者になりたくて！残響編, Kage no Jitsuryokusha ni Naritakute!: Zankyō-hen) is an upcoming Japanese anime film. Directed by Kazuya Nakanishi from a screenplay by Kanichi Katō, it is the direct sequel to the second season of the anime adaptation of Daisuke Aizawa's The Eminence in Shadow light novel series. The film adapts the "Return to Earth" story arc and follows Cid Kagenou as he is teleported back to modern Japan. It is set to open in Japanese theaters in 2027.

== Voice cast ==
- Seiichiro Yamashita as Cid Kagenou
- Yui Horie as Akane Nishino
- Inori Minase as Beta
- Takehito Koyasu as Mordred
- Yukari Tamura as Yūka Asakura

== Production ==
Following the conclusion of the second season of The Eminence in Shadow in December 2023, Shadow Garden and studio Nexus had begun and announced ongoing production of a sequel film for the season.
