= Oxt =

OXT or oxt may refer to:

- .oxt, the file name extension for software extension files used by Apache OpenOffice and LibreOffice. See OpenOffice.org#Extensions.
- Oxytocin, a hormone
  - OXT (gene), the gene for oxytocin
- OxT, a Japanese musical group
- The station code for Oxted railway station
