= Granbelm =

Japanese anime television series

- Promotional image for the anime.

グランベルム (Guranberumu)
- Genre: Mecha, Magical girl
- Created by: ProjectGRANBELM
- Anime television series
- Directed by: Masaharu Watanabe
- Produced by: Hirotaka Imagawa; Hiroshi Kamei
- Written by: Jukki Hanada
- Music by: Kenichiro Suehiro
- Studio: Nexus
- Licensed by: NA: Crunchyroll (streaming) Sentai Filmworks (home video)
- Original network: MBS, TBS, BS-TBS
- English network: SEA: Animax Asia
- Original run: July 5, 2019 – September 26, 2019
- Episodes: 13
- icon

Granbelm (グランベルム, Guranberumu) is a 2019 Japanese anime television series created and produced by Nexus. The series was directed by Masaharu Watanabe and written by Jukki Hanada, with original character designs by Shinichirou Otsuka, and music composed by Kenichiro Suehiro. Granbelm aired from July 5 to September 26, 2019, on the Animeism programming block. The series follows a group of 7 magical girls that pilot giant robots called "Armanox", where they fight in a battle royale where the winner obtains the title "Princeps Mage", allowing the user to wield all the magic inside the "Magiaconatus".

== Premise ==
Long ago, the world was rich with magic, until the wizards and witches used magic to wage war on one another, bringing the world to the brink of destruction. To prevent this, a group of wizards sealed all the world's magic into a device known as the "Magiaconatus" (マギアコナトス, Magiakonatosu), and since then, magic has been largely forgotten and wizards have been slowly disappearing, with just a few magical families existing all over the world.

In the modern age, however, magic is making a resurgence thanks to the Granbelm, a tournament involving magical girls that pilot giant robots called "Armanox" (アルマノクス, Arumanokusu), with the winner becoming the "Princeps Mage" (プリンセプスの魔術師, Purinsepusu no Majutsushi) and becoming able to wield all the magic inside the Magiaconatus. Mangetsu Kohinata finds her ordinary life forever changed when she discovers she is a mage and earns her own Armanox, the White Lily. As Mangetsu fights in the Granbelm, she meets other girls who fight to have their wishes granted.

== Characters ==
=== Main characters ===
Mangetsu Kohinata (小日向 満月, Kohinata Mangetsu)
Voiced by: Miyuri Shimabukuro
A seemingly normal high school student who suddenly finds herself caught in the middle of the Granbelm. She has no particular talents or aspirations, so she tries to be as helpful and friendly as possible to make up for it. Beneath this facade, however, she is very insecure about her being "empty." After meeting Shingetsu and becoming friends with her, she slowly begins to open up and decides to help make her wish come true. She is eventually revealed to actually be an artificial being created by the Magiaconatus to help Shingetsu win the Granbelm.
Her Armanox is White Lily (ホワイトリリー, Howaito Rirī), a white mecha with a sword as its primary armament, through she also has some ranged attacks. Though untrained, as a being made by Magiaconatus, she possessess enormous magical readings and can sometimes enter a state of extreme concentration, during which she is capable of overpowering her opponents through brute force. Shingetsu also teaches her how to summon her own familiar, Orca, a whale-like magical spirit that aids her in battle.

Her given name literally means "full moon", mirroring Shingetsu.
Shingetsu Ernesta Fukami (新月 エルネスタ 深海, Shingetsu Erunesuta Fukami)
Voiced by: Atsumi Tanezaki
A mysterious young woman who moved back to Japan from Germany in order to compete in Granbelm. Although she is initially opposed to Mangetsu entering Granbelm, she teams up with her and teaches her how to fight, which leads to their friendship. She was once friends with Anna Fugo, until the latter's jealousy towards her magical talents ended their friendship. This led her to hate magic resulted in her wish for winning the Granbelm being to erase it completely. It is eventually revealed that the Magiaconatus already decided for her to become the Princeps Mage and the entire Granbelm is actually just a test to determine if she's worthy.
Her Armanox is Viola Katze (ヴィオラカッツェ, Viora Kattse), a black mecha capable of both melee and ranged combat. Due to her experience as a mage, she possesses a large arsenal of spells and tactics. Her trump card is Growth, a spirit that takes on the form of a giant golem.

Her family name literally means "new moon", mirroring Mangetsu.

=== Granbelm participants ===
Anna Fugo (アンナ・フーゴ, Anna Fūgo)
Voiced by: Yōko Hikasa
A proud mage descending from one of Europe's most powerful mage families. She was once friends with Shingetsu, until she learned that she was brought in to become the family's successor over her, which led her to try to defeat her throughout the Granbelm to prove herself. By the time she discovered her mother wanted her to live a life free of the pressures of being a mage, it was too late as her jealousy of Shingetsu and obsession with beating her had caused her to fall into madness. She is the third mage to be eliminated from the Granbelm, after being defeated by Shingetsu. Afterwards, her existence was erased from the world, causing everyone not present during the battle to forget about her.
Her Armanox is Aconite Gris (アークナイトグリス, Ākunaito gurisu), a red mecha resembling royalty. Despite having very low magical power, she is able to fight in the Granbelm due to her Armanox providing her with a great deal of magic. She specializes in her family's trademark magic of temperature control, allowing her to manipulate both fire and ice. She is also able to make decoys to fight her battles for her.

Suishō Hakamada (袴田 水晶, Hakamada Suishō)
Voiced by: Aoi Yūki
A carefree mage who descended from a very minor mage family and the pilot of Drosela Nocturne (ドロセラノクターン, Dorosera Nokutān). Although she was initially Anna's lackey, she really has no loyalty to Anna and only followed her orders out of convenience's sake. When she learns Anna is a weak mage, at least compared to Shingetsu, Suishō stops working for her. It is also heavily implied, and later confirmed, that she was the one who cursed Kuon's sister Shisui into a coma. However, Kuon discovers that Shisui actually tricked Suishō into consuming a part of her soul in order to give Kuon a chance to win the Granbelm.
Rosa (ロサ)
Voiced by: Chinatsu Akasaki
A young mage that initially worked for Anna and the pilot of the Crest Anthurium (クレストアンス, Kuresuto Ansu). She is the first opponent Mangetsu defeats in the Granbelm. With her stone shattered, Rosa can no longer participate in the Granbelm and Anna throws her out of her house. In the new reality created after Anna's defeat, she is the elder daughter of the Fugo family.
Nene Rin (林 寧々, Rin Nene)
Voiced by: Yurika Kubo
A mage who hails from Hong Kong who fights in the Granbelm with tactical assistance from her sisters; Nana and Mimi. Although she's an adult, her child-like body has caused her to be assigned to a middle school, where she becomes acquainted to Kibō, Mangetsu's younger sister. She is the second mage to be eliminated from the Granbelm, after being defeated by Mangetsu. Afterwards, she continues to keep an eye on events and later begins investigating the phenomenon where Anna was erased from reality, which eventually leads her to uncover Mangetsu's nature as well as the truth behind the Granbelm.
Her Armanox is Ji Guang Long (ジーグァンロン, Jī Gwan Ron), which unlike of Armanox takes on the form of a spaceship rather than a mecha. Because of this, it relies on stealth and its powerful long-range abilities to fight. However, its true form is that of a huge mecha, several times larger than other Armanox, which uses its sheer size and longer reach for close quarters combat.

Kuon Tsuchimikado (土御門 九音, Tsuchimikado Kuon)
Voiced by: Manaka Iwami
The younger daughter of the Tsuchimikado family. She participates in the Granblem in the hopes of finding a cure for her sister Shisui, who has fallen into a magically induced coma. She later becomes enemies with Suishō, suspecting that she is responsible for her sister's condition. She also agrees to an alliance with Mangetsu and Shingetsu, so they can survive the Granbelm. Kuon is one of the very few that remembers Anna after her defeat in the Granbelm causes her to be erased from history. As the Granbelm continues, Kuon realizes Suishō consumed a part of Shisui's soul and Suishō uses this particular information in an attempt to demoralize Kuon, but Kuon later discovers that Shisui only did that so that Kuon could have a chance at winning the Granbelm. Despite her renewed efforts, however, Kuon is killed by Suishō and the Magiaconatus alters reality so that everyone, except the remaining Granbelm fighters, forget she ever existed, much like Anna before her.
Her Armanox is the Setsgetsu Baika (雪月梅花, Setsugetsu Baika), which can manipulate the environment and uses light-generated fans for battle.

=== Supporting characters ===
Kibō Kohinata (小日向 希望, Kohinata Kibō)
Voiced by: Hikaru Akao
Mangetsu's younger sister, who is unaware of her role in the Granbelm. In reality, however, she and her family are just being made to believe that Mangetsu is her older sister by the Magiaconatus. After Mangetsu's true nature is discovered, she and her family forget she ever existed.
Nana Rin (林 菜々, Rin Nana)
Voiced by: Juri Kimura
Nene's younger sister, who gives her tactical assistance in the Granbelm. She has the appearance of a high-school student.
Mimi Rin (林 美々, Rin Mimi)
Voiced by: Nozomi Kasuga
Nene's youngest sister, who gives her tactical assistance in the Granbelm. Despite being the youngest her mature appearance makes her seem like she's the oldest.
Claire Fugo (クレア・フーゴ, Claire Fūgo)
Voiced by: Marika Kouno
Anna's younger sister. Much like Anna, she knew Shingetsu since childhood, but unlike her sister, she never stopped loving her and hoped she would return to the Fugo family. After Anna is erased from reality, she forgets she ever existed and now believes Rosa to be her older sister.
Sasha (サーシャ, Sāsha)
Voiced by: Yumi Uchiyama
The Fugos family's servant.
Shisui Tsuchimikado (土御門 四翠, Tsuchimikado Shisui)
Voiced by: Yukari Tamura
The elder daughter of the Tsuchimikado family and Kuon's sister. She has been placed into a coma and Kuon participates in the Granbelm in order to save her.

== Production ==
The producer of Granbelm, Takayuki Nagatani, approached the animation studio Nexus in wanting to create a new series with them. Nexus told Nagatani that they are interested in creating an anime that features a "chibi-style robots", and Nagatani accepted the idea as he also love those kind of anime. Nagatani left the creative process to the studio while he would organize it. While hiring the Granbelm's staff, Nagatani and the studio firstly decided to bring a director, with Nexus suggesting Masaharu Watanabe as the director for the series since they worked with him in his production of Re:Zero − Starting Life in Another World, thus Watanabe was appointed as the director. The series composition was handled by Jukki Hanada. When deciding on who should be responsible for the series' character design, the staff discussed that they wanted "mellow visuals for the animation because it's the story of girls fighting with all their might", hearing that, director Watanabe suggested Shinichiro Otsuka, who's known for illustrating the artwork for Re:Zeros light novel. For the mecha designs, Nexus recommended Jimmy Stone.

Nagatani stated that Anna, a controversial character in the series, is the character he liked the most and stated that he understands her "personality" and sympathized with the character for carrying a "heavy burden". He praised Hanada on his ability for making each of the main characters "charming as well as unique", and states that "each character has their own great attributes" but Anna is the one that fascinates him the most. Nagatani thinks that as the story progresses, the viewers' favorite character will change. During the scenario meetings, the staff had agreed on the idea of "girls and magic" themed-series. When asked on why there aren't any male character in the series, Nagatani replied: "We decided that the Granbelm would be an all-girl battle pretty early on. I can't even recall us talking about any male characters joining the battle. We called the participants of the battle 'witches' and the story was about the female line of the family. I think that's why we didn't even consider a male character. I'd say that it naturally became an all-girls affair."

The anime was announced by Nexus on March 1, 2019. The series is directed by Masaharu Watanabe, with Jukki Hanada handling series composition, Shinichirou Otsuka as the original character designer, and Kenichiro Suehiro composing the music. Infinite is producing the anime. Eir Aoi performed the series' opening theme song "Tsuki o Ou Mayonaka" (月を追う真夜中, Following the Moon in the Middle of the Night), while Uru performed the series' ending theme song "Negai" (願い, Desire).

== Release ==
Granbelm aired from July 5 to September 26, 2019, on the Animeism programming block on MBS, TBS, and BS-TBS. It is streaming on Crunchyroll, which teams with Sentai Filmworks to release the series on home video in the United States.

=== Episode list ===
No.	Title	Original release date
1	"The Only Mages in the World"; Transliteration: "Sekai de Yuiitsu no Majutsushi" (Japanese: 世界で唯一の魔術師)	July 5, 2019
2	"Why I'm Here"; Transliteration: "Watashi ga Koko ni Iru Tame ni" (Japanese: 私がここにいるために)	July 12, 2019
3	"The Bell Tolls at the Full Moon"; Transliteration: "Mangetsu ni Kane wa Naru" (Japanese: 満月に鐘は鳴る)	July 19, 2019
4	"Feng Shui Master Lin Fen Fen"; Transliteration: "Fūsuishi Rinfenfen" (Japanese: 風水師リンフェンフェン)	July 26, 2019
5	"A Small Girl's Small Wish"; Transliteration: "Chīsana Shōjo no Chīsana Negai" (Japanese: 小さな少女の小さな願い)	August 2, 2019
6	"Magic Stones"; Transliteration: "Maseki" (Japanese: 魔石)	August 9, 2019
In the past a young Anna, Erenesta and Clare watched as Anna was performing a strong spell. Anna is arguing with her mother to use the family's stone but she tells Anna that the larger a magic stone grows, the more difficult it is to use it, if the haier isn't skilled enough the magical power within the stone will go berserk. Also saying if she used the Fugo Stone against Erenesta she won't win, in anger Anna tells her mother about the spell she performed when she was young. Erenesta and Mangetsu spend time with Kuon and she tells them her sister is cursed and wants to cure her, Anna is met by Rosa who mocks her. Erenesta and Mangetsu goes to visit Anna but Erenesta gets attacked by her with an axe, her mother and Erenesta decide to tell Anna the truth that her mother didn't want her the carry the misfortune of being the family's mage, Anna doesn't understand what they mean and her mother tells her that she actually lacks power, Anna tells it is impossible as she did that spell and shows it, but it is revealed was Erenesta who did the spell and was the one who secretly helped Anna when they were children. Her mother says Erenesta cares about her and wanted her to be happy, she was not born under a star that would bless her as a mage, no matter the effort she won't be at the same level as Erenesta, this revelation is to much for Anna and Erenesta tells her to be something else than a mage, as they leave Anna tells her to do her best. But as the end credits is unexpectedly interrupted, at night Anna as knocked out her mother and cut her blood vein on her hand with a shattered glass in an attempt to kill her, and found the secret room in her mother's bedroom where the Fugo Stone is, Anna has gone completely into madness.
7	"Miss Ressentiment"; Transliteration: "Misu Rusanchiman" (Japanese: ミス・ルサンチマン)	August 16, 2019
8	"What It Means to Become a Mage"; Transliteration: "Majutsushi ni naru to iu koto" (Japanese: 魔術師になるということ)	August 23, 2019
9	"NOCTURNE Changes Colors"; Transliteration: "Nokutān, Someagete" (Japanese: ノクターン、染め上げて)	August 30, 2019
10	"The Pensive Doll"; Transliteration: "Mono omou ningyō" (Japanese: もの思う人形)	September 6, 2019
11	"Even If My Goodbye Doesn't Reach You"; Transliteration: "Tatoe sayonara ga todokanakute mo" (Japanese: たとえさよならが届かなくても)	September 13, 2019
12	"Magiaconatus"; Transliteration: "Magiakonatosu" (Japanese: マギアコナトス)	September 20, 2019
13	"For the Only Two of Their Kind in the World"; Transliteration: "Sekai de yuiitsu no futari no tame ni" (Japanese: 世界で唯一のふたりのために)	September 26, 2019

== Reception ==
Granbelm was well-received by critics, with Andy Pfeiffer of Anime News Network listing the series as one of the best series of the summer 2019 anime season.

The Encyclopedia of Science Fiction described Granbelm as a combination of the magical girl and mecha genres, noting that despite its science-fiction elements, the series is predominantly fantasy. It identified the giant robots and Nene's analytical, video game-like approach to combat as its principal science-fiction features, while highlighting the otherworldly landscapes and the representation of magic through clockwork and geometric imagery. The encyclopedia found the mecha designs unremarkable, considering the characterization and the narrative revelations concerning the true nature of Mangetsu and Suishou more interesting. It also praised some of the visual sequences in the final episodes, particularly those accompanying the story's increasingly complex developments.

== See also ==
- Magic Knight Rayearth
