= Santa Company =

- Directed by: Kenji Itoso
- Screenplay by: Hiroshi Nakamura; Kenji Itoso; Naohiro Fukushima; Yumi Kamakura
- Produced by: Kenji Itoso
- Starring: Ayumi Fujimura; Yūki Kaji; Haruka Tomatsu; Rie Kugimiya; Takahiro Sakurai
- Music by: Yūsuke Itagaki
- Production companies: Nexus; Kenji Studio
- Release date: 2014
- Country: Japan
- Language: Japanese
- Budget: $72,270 (estimated)

Santa Company (Japanese: サンタ・カンパニー, Hepburn: Santa Kanpanī) is a 2014 Japanese anime short film that follows the story of a girl, Noel, and her friends as they deliver presents on Christmas Eve. The film was directed by Kenji Itoso through his own studio Kenji Studio.

== Synopsis ==
The story revolves around Noel, a young girl to whom Christmas is a particularly lonely time, as her mother left long ago and her father is too busy at Christmas time to come home. One day when she's heading to her apartment, the elevator instead opens into "Santa Company", the headquarters of all Santa's operations, in Finland. After some confusion she is brought into the introductory class where she learns how the company works, and then meets her father who works at the company as head of the present department. She decides to become an apprentice Tonttu, which here is an assistance role helping wrap and prepare presents for delivery. She has until dawn of Christmas Day to become a full-fledged Tonttu, but if she screws up she will lose her job and have to leave her new friends behind. Unfortunately, no one can tell her how one graduates from apprenticeship, except that she needs to be able to "pass the exam" and be able to say just what the most important task of the Santas is.

Late on Christmas Eve, a single request is received, but it is too late to deliver the gift. Desperate to be sure that child's present is delivered, Noel pulls her friends together for a desperate mission, taking the last remaining sleigh with her friends, at risk of her job and her whole life at the company. They recruit Rudolph III, the grandson of the original Rudolph and the only reindeer that hasn't been dispatched due to his disposition: years ago an incident happened with the woman who used to ride with him, and since then he's refused to work; on top of that, the females don't pay any attention to him, making him even more grumpy. However, when he meets Noel, who on top of being cute is almost identical to his former partner, he quickly agrees to help. Along the way, Bell gives Noel a bell he picked up as a protective talisman.

On the way Noel's friend Mint finally realizes that breaking the rules like this would put Noel's future in jeopardy and tries to get them to turn around, and as she struggles she accidentally knocks Noel out of the sleigh. She's saved by the shopkeeper who provides the presents, and he advises her that the answer to the exam is not something that can be taught or told, it's something unique to her that she needs to find herself. As they continue their journey, they're attacked by a collection of "mukku", sprites similar to ball lightning. They're saved by Pedro and the other Santas, who came to their aid, only for the remaining ones to join into a powerful spirit that grabs Noel and tries to consume her. Bell continues to attack the spirit and barely manages to save her, with help from the bell he'd given her that turns out to be a powerful talisman meant to remain sealed. With the danger overcome, Noel's father calls and tries to make her return and leave the delivery to Pedro; however, he is eventually convinced to permit her to deliver the present as long as Pedro accompanies her. After delivering the gift and reading the letter the child left in thanks, she decides that her answer to the exam, the most important thing about the Santa Company's work, is bringing smiles to all the children of the world. In the party after the deliveries had been made, the shopkeeper talks to Noel's father about her and her mother, who actually was consumed by a spirit in an incident similar to Noel's own experience, a fact which her father'd kept secret from her.

Along with the full-length movie, a shorter, twenty-eight minute version was also released, which cut Noel's initial entrance to the company, the fight with the spirit, and various other scenes.

== Cast ==
- Ayumi Fujimura as Noel White
- Yūki Kaji as Bell Crystal
- Haruka Tomatsu as Mint Rondo
- Rie Kugimiya as Thomas Dow
- Takahiro Sakurai as Pedro Rondo

== Production ==
Originally launched as a crowdsourcing campaign on the Japanese site Anipipo, the film aimed at raising ¥1,000,000 for production. The project was unsuccessful, raising only ¥904,001 of the original goal. The project was re-launched, this time on Kickstarter, on December 3, 2013. On December 22, 2013, the film met its original goal of $50,000, and managed to raise $72,270 by the end of the campaign.

The project was scheduled to be delivered to backers by Christmas 2014, the film was completed in July 2014. Kenji Studio planned to hold a special screening of the film for families who were affected by the 2011 Tōhoku earthquake and tsunami disaster. The film was screened at multiple film festivals around the world, starting with the Tokyo International Film Festival on October 25, 2014.

=== Other Projects ===
An extended anime film titled Santa Company: Christmas no Himitsu by Asahi Production premiered on November 29, 2019.

Another short film titled Santa Company: Midsummer Merry Christmas was released in 2021, as part of a campaign to raise awareness for marine debris.

In December 2022, two Kickstarter campaigns were being held for English subtitled and dubbed versions of the films. There was also a Kickstarter for an English translation of the manga. On December 26, 2022, Kickstarter suspended the campaigns for Santa Company - Midsummer Merry Christmas and the manga. On January 14, 2023, the Kickstarter for Santa Company: Christmas no Himitsu was canceled due to difficulties with production and the COVID-19 pandemic. The campaign only made US$7,288 of its US$9,238 goal.
