= List of The Eminence in Shadow characters =

This is a list of characters in the light novel series The Eminence in Shadow.

== Main characters ==
Cid Kagenou (シド・カゲノー, Shido Kagenō) / Shadow (シャドウ, Shadō) / Minoru Kageno (影野 実, Kageno Minoru)
Voiced by: Seiichiro Yamashita, (Japanese); Adam Gibbs, (English)
The antihero protagonist. Formerly 17-year-old high school student Minoru Kageno, after dying in a truck accident he is reincarnated in another world as Cid Kagenou, the 16-year-old son of a minor noble family. In order to fulfill his fixation of becoming a mastermind that pulls strings from behind the scenes, he uses his newfound magical abilities to covertly run Shadow Garden, an organization he established to oppose the Cult of Diablos (ディアボロス教団, Diaborosu Kyōdan). Though he initially considers both organizations to be fictional and their members to be mere role-players, he comes to realize that the threat posed by the Cult is real and struggles to fulfill the role has created for himself. As a shut-in and social outcast in both lives, he is oblivious and lacks common sense, with his outlook being shaped by fictional narratives causing him to have a misunderstanding of emotions and situations. He is not strictly good or evil, as he believes in eliminating evil while avoiding harming the innocent and vulnerable, but empathizes with those close to him. He has no interest in nobility, instead preferring the life of a commoner to avoid the unwanted attention that nobility brings, which he views as an obstacle to his goals.
He has two main personas: the "mob" persona, in which he seeks to blend in and be looked upon with disdain, to the point where he is no longer considered a person or given any attention and is forgotten. With the other persona, the Shadow persona, he strives to embody the epitome of coolness. This dichotomy is key to his success in deceiving others, as the personas are so different that they suggest he is two separate individuals, and only those close to him, such as Alpha, can see past the facade. Despite his talent and dedication to training, his chūnibyō tendencies interfere with his goals by driving him to act cool. As well, despite his influence through being the lord of Shadow Garden and having connections to others, his delusions prevent him from realizing this.
Cid's character was developed based on author Daisuke Aizawa's own values and experience, as he was once a chūnibyō. According to him, despite his intelligence, Cid's delusions have caused him to be unable to separate them from reality.
Cid has several identities he uses throughout the story, including:

- Fancy Hoodlum Slayer (ファンシー・フドラム・スレイヤー, Fanshī Fudoramu Sureiyā)
- Fancy Bandit Slayer (ファンシー・バンディット・スレイヤー, Fanshī Banditto Sureiyā)
- Mundane Mann (ジミナ・セーネン, Jimina Sēnen)

Voiced by: Hikaru Midorikawa (Japanese); Joe Daniels (English)
A weak-looking fallen aristocrat from the Altena Empire.

- John Smith (ジョン・スミス, Jon Sumisu)

Voiced by: Jun Fukuyama
Cid's second dalliance don in a FBI black suit, domino mask and finger-less gloves.

- Suzuki Hope (スズキ・ホープ, Suzuki Hōpu)

A short-lived minor noble from Midgar Academy.

- Jack the Ripper (ジャック・ザ・リッパー, Jakku Za Rīppā)

A Pennywise-like serial killer.

- Jean Pierre

A bowler hat food critic.
Claire Kagenou (クレア・カゲノー, Kurea Kagenō)
Voiced by: Rina Hidaka (Japanese); Luci Christian (English)
Cid's older sister, a skilled spellsword who is the top student in her grade. She worries about Cid and his future, wanting him to become stronger because she believes she will die soon due to her possession; unbeknownst to her, she was cured by Cid a long time ago. Although her devotion to him is sometimes obsessive, she truly cares for him and will do anything for him to ensure his happiness.
Soon after curing Alpha of her demon possession, Cid notices that Claire is showing signs of the same "possession" and cures her during physical training. During the Crimson Tower invasion arc, Claire is hit with Elisabeth's vampire blood, causing the hero's blood in her to come in contact with the vampire blood, which are actually the two sets of different descendants born from Aurora's blood. Due to possessing both demon and hero blood, this fulfills the condition for Aurora to use her body as a host, which she does due to the debt she feels she owes to Cid for risking his life to protect her and free her from the sanctuary. During the terrorist incident at the Midgar Spellsword Academy, Zeta transfers Diablos' right arm into her to resurrect the demon Diablos in her body, causing her to fall into a coma.
Alexia Midgar (アレクシア・ミドガル, Arekushia Midogaru)
Voiced by: Kana Hanazawa (Japanese); Olivia Swasey (English)
An arrogant and sadistic princess who aims to torment Cid. Though she presents herself as courteous and well-mannered, in reality, she derives pleasure from tormenting others. This stems from her feelings of envy at being compared to her sister, Iris, and her desire for people to see her based on her own merits. In the past, she and Cid dated as an act, but she developed genuine feelings for him while he wanted to end their relationship. After being kidnapped by her egotistical fiancée Zenon and used in a human experiment, Alexia expresses deep concern for Cid. She dislikes Natsume, unaware she's actually Beta from Shadow Garden. Following the events of the Bushin Festival, Alexia chooses to no longer be a mere "bystander" and become strong enough to fight for what she believes in. She is one of the few people besides Shadow Garden members to have personally seen "Shadow" in action. She makes it her goal to finding Shadow Garden's true motives.
Rose Oriana (ローズ・オリアナ, Rōzu Oriana) / (#666)
Voiced by: Haruka Shiraishi (Japanese); Donna Bella Litton (English)
The princess of the neighboring kingdom of Oriana, which is known for its arts, who later becomes queen with the help of Shadow and the Shadow Garden. She controversially takes up the sword instead of traditional arts and transfers to Midgar Spellsword Academy, where she becomes president of its student council and known for her swordsmanship. Upon discovering her father, King Raphael, had been brainwashed into a puppet by Duke Perv Asshat, Rose mercifully killed her father to prevent a civil war. Her possession soon emerges until Shadow offers Rose the cure. Cid later on left her a ring inserted with Raphael's adoration for Rose. After joining Shadow Garden, she becomes known as 666 along with her teammates 664 and 665; following her defection from Shadow Garden, she remains their associate and they continue working with her undercover as her royal maids and personal bodyguards. She is in love with Cid and is kind and down-to-earth, treating people equally regardless of their status, and wants to settle down and raise a family. After Shadow shows her the truth of her mother's affair with Perv, she takes it upon herself to prove the truth, ultimately succeeding and becoming queen.
Akane Nishino (西野アカネ, Nishino Akane) / (#712)
Voiced by: Yui Horie (Japanese); Natalie Rial (English)
The sole heiress to the Nishino Zeibetsu, a wealthy conglomerate, and Cid's classmate when he was alive as Minoru, who was reincarnated in the other world. Though she hated him for mispronouncing her name and not paying attention to her, she falls in love with him after he saves her several times. After Japan falls to Magical Beasts, she becomes a "Knight" in the human settlement of Messiah before being recruited by Shadow to join Shadow Garden; however, Cid never considered her more than an acquaintance. During their invasion of Earth, Beta misinterpreted Shadow's intention and kidnapped Akane, bringing her to their world to gain knowledge about the other world. According to the sixth light novel, she was assigned the number 712 as a member of Shadow Garden and, mistakenly believing that Minoru was kidnapped by Shadow Garden and became Eta's test subject, is determined to save him and bring him back to Japan with her.

== Shadow Garden ==
Shadow Garden (シャドウ・ガーデン, Shadō Gāden) is a covert underground organization founded by Cid Kagenou and his first subordinate and disciple, Alpha. While Alpha effectively manages the organization and its subsidiaries, such as Mitsugoshi Co., Cid has absolute authority.

=== Seven Shadows/Shades ===
The original seven members of the Shadow Garden after Cid, who hold the highest authority positions in the organization due to him personally training and educating them and granting them power. The only known exceptions are Rose, Victoria, Number 711/Millia, and Number 712/Akane Nishino.
Cid believes that, once he turned thirteen, they matured and chose to move on with their lives and pity him for his dedication to his fantasies. In reality, they are deeply in love with and devoted to him due to him saving them.
Alpha (アルファ, Arufa)
Voiced by: Asami Seto (Japanese); Christina Kelly (English)
The first member of Shadow Garden and the leader of the Seven Shadows, who is the direct descendant of the elf hero Olivier. When Cid first meets her, she is suffering from demon possession; while experimenting on her, he inadvertently discovers a cure for demon possession. In return for him saving her life, she swears absolute loyalty to him and becomes his second-in-command, recruiting the Seven Shades and leading them in their pursuit of the Cult of Diablos. She has utmost faith in Cid and trusts him deeply, as he is the only one she shows her true self to; in return, she is the Shadow Garden member he shows the most respect to, entrusting her with preparing for missions and informing him of plans. She is also in love with him, and the thought of outliving him leads Cid to increase his lifespan from 200 to 300 so that they have the same lifespan. Alpha is emotionally dependent on Cid, to the extent that, following Cid's presumed betrayal during the counterfeit arc, she planned to commit suicide due to no longer having a purpose in life. Despite this, he is unaware of her feelings for him.
Beta (ベータ, Bēta) / Natsume Kafka (夏目カフカ, Kafuka Natsume)
Voiced by: Inori Minase (Japanese); Annie Wild (English)
An elf and the second member of Shadow Garden, who writes 'The War Chronicles of Shadow-sama,' detailing the exploits of Cid in his Shadow persona. Under the pen name Natsume Kafka, she becomes a world-famous author publishing the stories Cid tells her, including popular media like Spirited Away and Spider-Man. As a jack-of-all-trades, she is given the positions of Operations Coordinator and Head of Mission Logistics in Shadow Garden. She is the target of Epsilon secret-self-rivalry in term of Bust Size, due to possess the biggest pair among all Seven Shade.
Gamma (ガンマ, Ganma) / Luna
Voiced by: Suzuko Mimori (Japanese); Elissa Cuellar (English)
An elf and the third member of Shadow Garden, who is known as "the Brain", as, despite being weak both physically and in technique, she is highly intelligent. She holds the positions of Head of Finance and Administration in Shadow Garden and is responsible for the operations of Mitsugoshi Company, the front organization that funds it, under the alias Luna. Cid told her about concepts and products from his world in the form of his "Shadow Knowledge," which she recreates and sells for profit.
Delta (デルタ, Deruta) / Sara (サラ)
Voiced by: Fairouz Ai (Japanese); Raven Troup (English)
A dog beast-kin girl and the fourth member of Shadow Garden, who is known as "the Glass Cannon" due to being strong and violent, but unintelligent. Being a beast-kin nature, she possesses heightened senses that she uses to track and hunt her targets. She only listens to those stronger than her and has only acknowledged Alpha and Cid as being stronger than her. Many Shadow Garden members consider her its main fighting force due to her ferocity and ruthlessness in battle.
Epsilon (イプシロン, Ipushiron) / Shiron
Voiced by: Hisako Kanemoto (Japanese); Ellen Evans (English)
An elf and the fifth member of Shadow Garden, who is known as "Precise". She is skilled in the use of the slime bodysuits worn by the organization's members, using it to make her seem tall and busty due to her being insecure about her short and slender figure. In public, she goes under the alias of Shiron, a world-famous pianist and composer who popularized the Moonlight Sonata, which Cid taught her and which she uses to infiltrate influential circles.
Zeta (ゼータ, Zēta) / Lilim (リリム, Ririmu)
Voiced by: Ayaka Asai (Japanese); Dominique Meyer (English)
A cat beast-kin and descendant of the legendary "Beast-kin Hero" Lily who is the sixth member of Shadow Garden, who is in charge of the organization's recon and travels the world in search of new sights and products. She disapproves of Alpha's leadership and does not get along with her due to her dedication to eliminating the Cult of Diablos putting them at odds. She secretly creates a sub-branch within Shadow Garden that is loyal to her, with the goal of making Shadow immortal and the god of the new world to ensure that the Cult of Diablos does not return.
Eta (イータ, Īta) / Eta Lloyd Wright
Voiced by: Reina Kondō (Japanese); Genevieve Simmons (English)
The seventh and final member of the original Shadow Garden, who serves as its chief scientist and is renowned for her technological prowess, having perfected devices such as the functional digital camera and the disguise machine. In public, she is known as Eta Lloyd Wright, a genius architect who has earned awards for her work, which incorporates basic scientific and mathematical principles that Shadow taught her. She often employs her six sisters as test subjects for her experiments and seeks to conduct experiments on Cid in order to understand the feelings she is experiencing and know him better.

=== Numbers ===
The Numbers are members of Shadow Garden who were recruited by the Seven Shadows due to their superior skills to serve as the organization's combat force assets. Their enumeration starts from 8 and continues onward, with the newest number being 666 in the English release and 712 in the Japanese release. There are two groups of numbers within the organization: Named Numbers and regular numbers.

=== Named Numbers ===
The Named Numbers are members whose abilities were recognized by the Seven Shadows. They serve as their direct subordinates after being granted a Greek letter like them, based on certain numbers in recognition of their abilities on the ranks from Theta (Θ/θ) to Omega (Ω/ω).

Lambda (ラムダ, Ramuda) (#11) / Zinaida (ジナイーダ, Jinaīda)
Voiced by: Ikumi Hasegawa (Japanese); Liz Arends (English)
One of the Named Numbers and Shadow Garden's main drill instructor, who is in charge of training new recruits. Originally part of the Velgalta Empire's military, she was captured by the Cult after showing symptoms of demon possession. After being rescued by Shadow Garden when they raided the hidden facility she was being held in, she joins them after being cured by Epsilon and learning the truth about the Cult of Diablos.
Nu (ニュー, Nyū) (#13) / Nicoletta Marquez (ニコレッタ・マルケス, Nikoretta Marukesu)
Voiced by: Maaya Uchida (Japanese); Cat Thomas (English)
The daughter of Marquis Marquez, whose family is aristocratic and wealthy, renowned for skilled assassins, interrogators, and investigators specializing in torture and pain. Nu was abandoned after being possessed and the Cult of Diablos took her in as a test subject, as humans being possessed was a rare occurrence and they believed that possessed humans harbored valuable secrets. She conceals her true appearance with makeup, presenting herself as unremarkable as possible. After being rescued and initiated into Shadow Garden by one of the Seven Shadows, she uses her disguise skills at the Mitsugoshi Company, where she serves as Gamma's personal aide and bodyguard.
Chi (カイ, Kai) (#22) / Karen von Herzog (カレン・フォン・ヘルツォーク, Karen fon Herutzōku) / Shooting Star (流星, Nagase)
Voiced by: Mayu Minami (Japanese); Kalin Coates (English)
Formerly one of the Velgalta's Seven Blades and a Named First Child of the Cult of Diablos, known as Shooting Star, she defected to Shadow Garden after the Cult discovered she had been possessed and killed her family. Initially codenamed No. 111, she quickly rose through the ranks thanks to the power and training she had from her time in the Cult and became Epsilon's subordinate.
Omega (オメガ, Omega) (#24) / Olga (オルガ, Oruga)
Voiced by: Ryōko Maekawa (Japanese); Skyler Sinclair (English)
A victim of demon possession who Shadow Garden rescued. Initially codenamed No. 122, she quickly rose through the ranks and became Epsilon's subordinate.

==== Regular Numbers ====
Nameless infantry who have above-average capabilities and undergo training to become the best warriors. They have earned the right to challenge the "Named Numbers" to obtain their position by defeating a gatekeeper.

(#559) / Victoria (ウィクトーリア, Wikutōria)
Voiced by: Miku Itō (Japanese); Molly Searcy (English)
An elf who was the revered saint of the Holy Church of Divine Teachings and leader of the Templars. The Church specially raised her and other children to lead the templars, and she survived despite being subjected to experiments, abuse, and brainwashing. After displaying signs of demon possession, she was abandoned until Cid saved her and granted her a new purpose in life. As a result of her past, she harbors hatred towards the Church and the Cult. Her unwavering devotion led her to join the Numbers, where she quickly rose through the ranks due to her skills and Lambda's training. Despite her prowess, her headstrong nature, lack of battle strategy, poor communication skills, and disregard for civilian lives can be a problem. She is also a member of Zeta's secret sub-branch.
(#664) / Nami (ナミ, Nami)
Voiced by: Miyu Tomita (Japanese); Dominique Meyer (English)
One of the Numbers. She is the leader of a three-person squad consisting of herself, 665, and Rose/666. After Rose becomes queen of the Oriana Kingdom, she works undercover as one of her maids and personal bodyguard.
(#665)
Voiced by: Hina Yōmiya (Japanese); Christie Guidry (English)
One of the Numbers. She is also part of a three-person squad consisting of herself, Nami/664, and Rose/666. After Rose becomes queen of the Oriana Kingdom, 665 becomes one of her maids and personal bodyguard alongside Nami.
(#711) / Millia (ミリア, Miria)
Voiced by: Yuka Nukui
She is the daughter of the late Viscount Grease, who became an experimental research subject for the Cult of Diablos after contracting demon possession, with Viscount serving them in hopes of finding a way to cure her. After her encounter with Alpha, she is retrieved and revived by the Cult of Diablos to be turned into a weapon, only for Cid to save and cure her. She is trained by Lambda, who noticed her talent in swordsmanship.

== Crimson Order ==
Iris Midgar (アイリス・ミドガル, Airisu Midogaru)
Voiced by: Yoko Hikasa (Japanese); Patricia Duran (English)
Princess Alexia's older sister and leader of the Crimson Order. Though considered a skilled and capable leader, after Shadow defeats her during the tournament, she vows vengeance against him, causing her to become irrational and volatile in her leadership and decision-making. This causes her subordinates and Alexia to doubt and question her mentality.

== Midgar Academy ==
Sherry Barnett (シェリー・バーネット, Sherī Bānetto)
Voiced by: Saya Aizawa (Japanese); Brittney Karbowski (English)
A cheery researcher at Midgar Academy and adopted daughter of Lutheran, its vice principal, who adopted her following her mother's death. After he dies, she leaves the academy to study more. She is friends with Cid, but obsessive hates his alter ego not knowing both are the same person. Discovering Lutheran was Sherry's mother's murderer and a Cult member, Cid spares Sherry's feelings by not revealing the true nature of the situation.
Skel Etal (ヒョロ・ガリ, Hyoro Gari)
Voiced by: Yoshitsugu Matsuoka (Japanese); Nathan Wilson (English)
One of Cid's fellow low-level students.
Po Tato (ジャガ・イモ, Jaga Imo)
Voiced by: Shin Matsushige (Japanese); Greg Ayres (English)
One of Cid's fellow low-level students.
Nina (ニナ, Nina)
Zeta's personal subordinate and an unofficial member of Shadow Garden. She infiltrates Midgar Magic Swordsman Academy as a student, befriending Claire while monitoring her as part of their plan to revive Diablos using her body. Along with Zeta and Victoria, they aim to make Cid the new god of the world and grant him immortality. Despite operating outside Shadow Garden, Nina respects Cid and is one of the few people aware that he and Shadow are the same person.
Christina Hope (クリスティーナ・ホープ, Kurisutīna Hōpu)
Cid's classmate, who is the daughter of a Marques and distant relative of Suzuki Hope. Though kind, she can be serious and kind personality, but her seriousness can sometimes obscure her surroundings. Initially, she views Shadow Garden as a terrorist organization and harbors hatred towards Shadow following the fake Shadow Garden terrorist incident orchestrated by Lutheren Burnett. However, her perspective on Shadow changes after he saves her during the second terrorist incident while disguised as Suzuki Hope.
Christina later falls in love with Shadow while struggling to remember Cid. After the Count Goethe Monno murder, she forces Cid to move to her mansion for his safety, fearing trouble that could arise from his knowledge of confidential documents related to the 13 Blades murder. Despite being unaware that Cid is actually Shadow, she befriends him and inherits the role of Jack the Reaper to carry out the murder of Elizah, a corrupt noble.

== Cult of Diablos ==
=== Knights of the Round ===
Mordred (モードレッド, Mōdoreddo)
Voiced by: Takehito Koyasu
The 9th seated Knight of Rounds and the leader of the Cult of Diablos, which operates in the Oriana Kingdom. After his underling's blunder results in the Cult's activities being exposed, he attempts to destroy the Kingdom as a cover-up, only to be thwarted and killed by Shadow.

== Lawless City ==
Lawless City (無法(むほう)都市(とし), Muhō Toshi) is a global epicenter of criminal activity entrenched in an unending power struggle, with the Three Monarchs vying for dominance over its territories, each marked by towering structures.
Its current leaders, Elisabeth, Yukime, and Juggernaut, did not initially govern it. The Crimson Tower, the first tower in Lawless City, served as a lair and refuge for vampires. Over centuries, other monarchs arrived and rose to power before building towers to mark their territory.
Juggernaut (ジャガノート, Jaganōto)
Voiced by: Tsuyoshi Koyama (Japanese); Luis Galindo (English)
One of the three leaders of the Lawless City, who is killed by Delta.
Yukime (ユキメ)
Voiced by: Shizuka Itō (Japanese); Courtney Lomelo (English)
One of the three leaders of the Lawless City, who is in charge of the brothels. After Crimson and Juggernaut's deaths, she becomes its sole leader. She often works with Cid under his alias "John Smith" to undermine lawful businesses that prove troublesome and falls in love with Shadow after he saves her from Gettan.
Crimson (クリムゾン, Kurimuzon)
Voiced by: Tomokazu Sugita (Japanese); Dickie Sanders (English)
The true Monarch of the Crimson Tower in the Lawless City, who attempts to manipulate Elisabeth to fulfill his desire of restoring the Vampire race's status as the rulers of the world.
Mary (メアリー, Mearī)
Voiced by: Ai Kakuma (Japanese); Katelyn Barr (English)
A vampire and legendary Ancient Vampire Hunter, who served as Elisabeth's closest aide. Forming a cooperative relationship with Claire, she dedicates her life to stopping Progenitor's rampage to prevent another Red Moon tragedy.
Elisabeth (エリザベート, Erizabēto)
Voiced by: Saori Hayami (Japanese); Brianna Roberts (English)
A Vampire Progenitor who was formerly one of the Three Monarchs of the Lawless City, where she was the seeming ruler of the Crimson Tower. In reality, she was actually a figurehead used by her subordinate, Crimson, and abdicates the position after being saved by Shadow.

== Major Corporate Alliance ==
Gettan (月丹)
Voiced by: Daisuke Namikawa
Yukime's fiancée and an employee of the Major Corporate Alliance who is hired by Garter and the superior, who commands the most prolific mercenary Clovers. In reality, he controls the Alliance and collaborates with the Cult of Diablos to destroy the Mitsugoshi Company.
Garter Kikuchi (ガーター・キクチ, Gātā Kikuchi)
Voiced by: Chafurin
A former president of the Garter Corporation and Gettan's primary confidant. He acted as the figurehead for the Major Corporate Alliance, overseeing movement and providing reports on circumstances while Gettan dictated policy and actions.

== Other characters ==
Aurora (アウロラ, Aurora) / Diablos (ディアボロス, Diaborosu)
Voiced by: Kaori Nazuka (Japanese); Shelley Calene-Black (English)
A woman from the distant past, who is known as the "Witch of Calamity" who once plunged the world into chaos. She meets Cid during the Goddess' Trial after being summoned to fight him; after he helps free her from the Sanctuary, she uses Claire's body as a vessel following the Red Moon Incident. She is implied to be Diablos, the entity that the Cult of Diablos seeks to resurrect.
Beatrix (ベアトリクス, Beatorikusu)
Voiced by: Mikako Komatsu (Japanese); Allison Sumrall (English)
The goddess of war, who resembles Alpha and claims her as her niece, who she is looking for. She is also the first winner of the Bushin Festival Tournament. She and Iris face Shadow in a fierce battle across the border and not fully seeing what power and influence does Shadow Garden have on the world.
Annerose Nichtsehen (アンネローゼ・フシアナス, An'nerōze Fushianasu)
Voiced by: Shion Wakayama (Japanese); Chelsea McCurdy (English)
A powerful wandering swordswoman from the Velgalta Empire, who was formerly a member of the Velgalta's Seven Blades. She was one of Cid's opponents during the Bushin Festival Tournament. She initially judges Mundane Mann not enter the tournament, that is until Cid proves her that appearances don't reflect one's talent (which is what he intend to do), and comes to respect his outstanding speed and combat and wishes for a rematch.
