= Touring After the Apocalypse =

Japanese manga series

- First tankōbon volume cover

終末ツーリング (Shūmatsu Tsūringu)
- Genre: Adventure; Post-apocalyptic; Science fiction
- Manga
- Written by: Sakae Saito
- Published by: ASCII Media Works
- English publisher: NA: Yen Press
- Imprint: Dengeki Comics NEXT
- Magazine: Dengeki Maoh
- Original run: September 26, 2020 – present
- Volumes: 9
- Anime television series
- Directed by: Yoshinobu Tokumoto
- Written by: Kazuyuki Fudeyasu
- Music by: Kenichiro Suehiro
- Studio: Nexus
- Licensed by: NA: Aniplex of America; SEA: Plus Media Networks Asia
- Original network: Tokyo MX, GYT, GTV, BS11, Mētele, ytv, AT-X
- Original run: October 4, 2025 – December 20, 2025
- Episodes: 12
- icon

Touring After the Apocalypse (Japanese: 終末ツーリング, Hepburn: Shūmatsu Tsūringu) is a Japanese manga series written and illustrated by Sakae Saito. It began serialization in ASCII Media Works' seinen manga magazine Dengeki Maoh in September 2020. An anime television series adaptation produced by Nexus aired from October to December 2025.

== Plot ==
In a post-apocalyptic world, two girls, Youko and Airi, travel on a solar-powered motorcycle across Japan's ruined landscape, after leaving their bunker. Along their journey, they confront natural and animal dangers, and learn about themselves and the world around them in the process, particularly traveling to places that Youko's sister Chitose visited before the apocalypse, including some of Japan's famous sights, like Tokyo Big Sight and the Yokohama Bay Bridge, and hope to contact other surviving humans. It is slowly revealed how the world became this way.

== Characters ==
Youko (ヨーコ, Yōko)
Voiced by: Konomi Inagaki
Probably the last person on Earth still living after the apocalyptic rain of huge meteors. She travels around what remains of Japan in an electrified Yamaha Serow, to the places she and her big sister, Chitose, once traveled to before the apocalypse.
Airi (アイリ)
Voiced by: Miyu Tomita
An android girl who is Youko's companion ever since being sealed inside a shelter that kept them from harmful radiation immediately after the apocalypse.
Chitose (千歳)
Voiced by: Haruka Tomatsu
A woman who educated Youko and Airi by video link as a teacher in the shelter. Youko calls her "Big Sis". She appears in flashbacks and through videos and photos, but is not shown otherwise as having a living body.

== Media ==
=== Manga ===
Written and illustrated by Sakae Saito, Touring After the Apocalypse began serialization in ASCII Media Works' seinen manga magazine Dengeki Maoh on September 26, 2020. Its chapters have been compiled into nine tankōbon volumes as of June 2026.

During their panel at Sakura-Con 2022, Yen Press announced that they had licensed the series for English publication.

No.	Original release date	Original ISBN	North American release date	North American ISBN
1	April 26, 2021	978-4-04-913801-6	November 22, 2022	978-1-9753-4880-9
2	September 27, 2021	978-4-04-914003-3	March 21, 2023	978-1-9753-5271-4
3	May 27, 2022	978-4-04-914386-7	July 18, 2023	978-1-9753-6373-4
4	February 27, 2023	978-4-04-914846-6	December 12, 2023	978-1-9753-7663-5
5	October 26, 2023	978-4-04-915308-8	December 10, 2024	979-8-8554-0817-1
6	June 26, 2024	978-4-04-915794-9	July 22, 2025	979-8-8554-1665-7
7	March 27, 2025	978-4-04-916337-7	April 28, 2026	979-8-8554-2823-0
8	October 27, 2025	978-4-04-916746-7	February 23, 2027	979-8-8554-4978-5
9	June 26, 2026	978-4-04-952276-1	—	—

=== Anime ===
An anime television series adaptation was announced on February 24, 2025. It is produced by Aniplex, animated by Nexus and directed by Yoshinobu Tokumoto, with Kazuyuki Fudeyasu writing and supervising series scripts, Usaku Myouchin designing the characters, and Kenichiro Suehiro composing the music. The series aired from October 4 to December 20, 2025, on Tokyo MX and other networks. The opening theme song is "Touring", performed by Conton Candy, and the ending theme song is "Glide" (グライド, Guraido), performed by Myuk. Aniplex of America licensed the series for streaming on Crunchyroll. Plus Media Networks Asia licensed the series in Southeast Asia for broadcast on Aniplus Asia.

==== Episodes ====
No.	Title	Directed by	Storyboarded by	Original release date
1	"Hakone"; Transliteration: "Hakone" (Japanese: 箱根)	Yoshinobu Tokumoto	Yoshinobu Tokumoto	October 4, 2025
As they recharge their battery-powered motorcycle, Youko and Airi explore the cafe at the peak of Mount Taikan, Hakone. Airi later finds the wreck of a Maneuver Combat Vehicle and a nearby support truck containing rations. As they rest for some time, Airi notices that the MCV's sensors are watching them, and it suddenly springs back to life and attacks them. Airi disables the MCV using her arm-mounted plasma cannon, then Youko permanently shuts its AI off. They later take a side trip to Hakone's hot springs, where Youko had flashbacks of their trips to Hakone with her big sister, before heading to Yokohama Minato Mirai next.
2	"Yokohama, Yokosuka"; Transliteration: "Yokohama・Yokosuka" (Japanese: 横浜・横須賀)	Kaho Kamiya	Yoshinobu Tokumoto	October 11, 2025
Youko and Airi travel toward the now-submerged Yokohama Minato Mirai but are stopped by the broken Yokohama Bay Bridge. As Youko goes fishing, Airi discovers the upper half of a cyborg, who reactivates when connected to their motorcycle's battery and tells them to call him Schwar (the Japanese equivalent of Arnie). Carrying a photo of his family, Schwar slowly regains his memories as they journey toward Yokosuka. Along the way, they encounter the wreck of a Sōryū-class submarine perched on the road. Moved by the sight of a family of mutated giant orcas, Schwar—whose real name is Ichiro Suzuki, a sailor with the Maritime Self-Defense Force—feels sorrow for never returning to his loved ones. Though Youko invites him to join them, he chooses to stay behind. As his batteries run out, Ichiro reflects on his past and family, finally sinking into the sea near Yokosuka.
3	"Setagaya, Shinbashi, Ariake, Tokyo Big Sight"; Transliteration: "Setagaya・Shinbashi・Ariake・Tōkyō・Biggu Saito" (Japanese: 世田谷・新橋・有明・東京ビッグサイト)	Daisuke Takashima	Kazuya Nakanishi	October 18, 2025
As Youko and Airi charge their motorcycle just outside Tokyo, they obtain much-needed fresh water from a river and search abandoned houses for food. In one house, they discover a cache of food, and choose to stay there overnight; Youko finds the remains of its former occupants lying in bed. They reach the partly-submerged Tokyo Big Sight the next day by following the ruined Yurikamome railway. Youko hopes to see motorcycles exhibited there—based on a photo with her older sister at an annual motorcycle show—but find only remnants of doujin manga from the last event. Reading one, she feels the passion of its creator. As they rest after swimming with penguins in the nearby sea, Youko dreams of the world before the apocalypse—riding a gasoline-powered version of her motorcycle with her big sister. Upon waking, Airi hears distant music from an anime series, and tells Youko to tune her phone's radio to the frequency of an FM station still transmitting from somewhere in the ruins of Akihabara.
4	"Akihabara"; Transliteration: "Akihabara" (Japanese: 秋葉原)	Kaho Kamiya	Kazuya Nakanishi	October 25, 2025
Youko and Airi trace the FM broadcast to its source in Akihabara, hoping to find surviving humans. Their search leads them to a cosplay cafe and streets overrun by descendants of animals that escaped from Ueno Zoo. After an encounter with a tiger, they locate the radio station in the UDX building. Inside the broadcast room, they discover a solar-powered computer running the station automatically using an AI, DJ Akiba Jiro II, who can "see" and "hear" through a web camera, but cannot hold full conversations. Notes left by its creator, DJ Akiba Taro, as well as a box of manuals and parts, reveal he rigged the station's computer and programmed the AI to allow it to continue broadcasting even after humanity's fall. When the AI shuts down at sunset, Youko and Airi spend the night repairing and upgrading the station with scavenged parts, adding a speaker system. DJ Akiba Jiro II reactivates the next morning, and reads their message encouraging it to "keep delivering music to the world", and plays their requested song—based on a nursery rhyme by Takashi Yanase—as they leave Akihabara.
5	"Nagareyama, Tone River Canal, Kisarazu"; Transliteration: "Nagareyama・Tone-gawa Unga・Kisarazu" (Japanese: 流山・利根川運河・木更津)	Daisuke Takashima	Kazuya Nakanishi	November 1, 2025
While traveling through the swampy ruins of the highway somewhere in Chiba toward Umihotaru, Youko and Airi hit a muddy patch and decide to camp overnight to clean themselves and their motorcycle. Youko briefly considers returning to the shelter for repairs but chooses to continue their journey, eager to see more of the world. While the two are fishing for dinner, Youko notices the wind dying down, fish fleeing, and an unnaturally large full moon. The next day, with Youko still drowsy and unsettled by the night's strange calm, they ride on; Youko feels something bad is about to happen. Their worries deepen when they suffer their first tire puncture and encounter a supercell. They finally reach the remnants of the Tokyo Bay Aqua-Line, and Youko experiences fear—and the thrill that comes with it—for the first time as they cross Tokyo Bay in stormy weather. The two take refuge at the Umihotaru service area, unaware that unseen eyes are watching them.
6	"Umihotaru"; Transliteration: "Umihotaru" (Japanese: 海ほたる)	Daisuke Takashima	Kazuya Nakanishi	November 8, 2025
Sheltering from the storm at Umihotaru, Youko dreams of her times there with her sister—sharing food, the vending machines, and Tokyo's night view. Exploring their location afterward, she and Airi find familiar spots from that dream and discover the "eyes" watching them were an enormous swarm of rats. Trying to fend off the rats' attack, they accidentally ignite fuel leaking from a tanker, causing an explosion that kills the rats and blows the duo clear of Umihotaru. Safe but shaken, Youko realizes the harsh reality of the world's dangers and cruelties hiding beneath their seemingly carefree travels. That night, they witness glowing blue waters caused by ostracods and lightning illuminating the shadowed ruins of Tokyo's skyline. Youko photographs the sight out of awe. An email from her sister arrives, coinciding with Airi suddenly freezing. The message mentions a system glitch affecting the AI-Re06 android model--Airi's model, which will need to be repaired at a research lab in Tsukuba. The next morning, as they do laundry, Airi suggests Youko should get a medical checkup as well. After ringing the Bell of Happiness, they set out for Tsukuba.
7	"Tsukuba"; Transliteration: "Tsukuba" (Japanese: つくば)	Kaho Kamiya	Kazuya Nakanishi	November 15, 2025
Youko and Airi stop at the National Motorcycle Shrine before heading to Tsukuba. After a wrong turn, they find the research lab—whose entrance is a payphone beside a full-scale H-II rocket model—and descend into an underground facility where automated instructions guide Airi's maintenance and Youko's health check. When they exit, Airi's glitch is fixed, and she has found and gathered space food and an astronaut helmet from a nearby building. Their Touringram app updates with GPS tagging and an offline stamp rally tied to places Youko's sister once visited. They spend the night at the ruins of the Tsukuba Expo Center Planetarium, wondering if more research facilities—and perhaps more people—might still exist, even in space. Their next destination is the closest marked location: Kasumigaura.
8	"Kasumigaura, Mobility Resort Motegi"; Transliteration: "Kasumigaura・Mobiriti Rizōto Motegi" (Japanese: 霞ヶ浦・モビリティリゾートもてぎ)	Daisuke Takashima	Yoshinobu Tokumoto	November 22, 2025
At Lake Kasumigaura, Youko and Airi hunt ducks, gather lotus roots, and playfully wrestle in the mud before exploring the Rainbow Tower. There, they test Touringram's offline stamp rally, which works even without internet. At the Mobility Resort Motegi, their next stop, Youko wants to ride the still-intact Twin Ring circuit but waits to charge their motorcycle. Exploring the place and collecting their next digital stamp in the meantime, Youko briefly hears phantom engines on the start-finish line. Camping overnight, they see fireflies, prompting Airi to ask about the idea of a "soul", which triggers memories of Youko's past at the track. The next day, with the battery full, Youko runs the circuit at full speed, wearing a helmet Airi found in the paddock—mirroring her sister's ride years before. Airi waves a checkered flag at the finish, and the two ride the course together.
9	"Mobility Resort Motegi"; Transliteration: "Mobiriti Rizōto Motegi" (Japanese: モビリティリゾートもてぎ)	Yoshinobu Tokumoto	Yoshinobu Tokumoto	November 29, 2025
After finishing their run at Mobility Resort Motegi, Youko hears voices that lead her and Airi to the Honda Collection Hall. They restore power to the building and awaken ISAAQ, a maintenance robot who guides them through the vast collection of historic machines—from early Hondas to famous 500cc Grand Prix bikes and Formula 1 cars. When Youko asks if any people remain, ISAAQ confirms there are none. Youko dreams of riding the bike on the track, and by noon the #46 bike she wanted to ride is waiting for her. She rides while Airi remotely drives a sports car, and ISAAQ becomes overwhelmed by memories of the racetrack's former glory. Youko briefly sees the "spirits" of the vehicles racing alongside them and thanking them, nearly causing her to crash. Back in the pits, they realize only Youko witnessed these visions—and ISAAQ has stood unresponsive, finding out he's been in rough shape from the start, with the other robots being merely inert. Later that night, they see strange lights drifting in the air, leading Youko to wonder if machines and places might have "souls" too, and whether those unseen presences helped make her dream momentarily real.
10	"Oarai, Oya, Nikko"; Transliteration: "Oarai・Oya・Nikko" (Japanese: 大洗・大谷・日光)	Kaho Kamiya	Yoshinobu Tokumoto	December 6, 2025
Youko and Airi arrive at the Oarai ferry terminal, only to find it submerged. Youko dreams of boarding a ferry to Hokkaido with her sister, inspiring thoughts of continuing their journey north. Airi suggests using the highway instead, while stopping at sights along the way. At the Oya History Museum, they search the cold underground halls for their next stamp, finally spotting the QR code on the ceiling while avoiding areas with human remains. They later visit the Kameiwa "Benkei Sword-Split Rock", narrowly avoiding being crushed when a boulder collapses. Taking the steep Nikko Irohazaka road, Youko nearly loses control from excitement but makes it to the summit. At Kegon Falls, they follow an overgrown emergency route to the viewing deck, where the stunning sight leaves them silent—Youko moved to tears.
11	"Yoshimi Hundred Caves"; Transliteration: "Yoshimi Hyakketsu" (Japanese: 吉見百穴)	Kaho Kamiya	Yoshinobu Tokumoto	December 13, 2025
While fishing at Lake Chuzenji, Airi hears a brief high-pitched sound. After visiting Senjogahara and the Nikko Toshogu Shrine, she urges Youko to head toward the place where she heard it. From the tri-boundary of Gunma, Saitama, and Tochigi, they follow the sound to the Yoshimi Hundred Caves, where they find glowing moss and camp overnight. While Youko sleeps, Airi follows the sound and, discovering a cat, encounters a blinding flash and a dark, shifting object. When the cat disappears into it, Airi is pulled in as well and transported to outer space, where an unseen presence communicates with her and shows her Earth in the distant past. Airi later reappears near the caves and reunites with Youko, explaining that she encountered an alien teleportation device and that the Hundred Caves were built by humans and aliens 1,500 years ago. The beings, unable to communicate directly and having waited too long, believe civilization is still evolving. To answer them, Youko rides her motorcycle up the cave stairs, symbolizing humanity's progress. The aliens respond with a bright light, leaving a final message: to meet again at the same place in 100 years.
12	"Venus Line, Shelter"; Transliteration: "Bīnasu Rain / Sherutā" (Japanese: ビーナスライン / シェルター)	Daisuke Takashima	Kazuya Nakanishi	December 20, 2025
After camping overnight, Youko and Airi travel along the Venus Line toward Kirigamine but are forced to stop due to fog and landslide risks. While waiting at an abandoned teahouse, they hike on foot to the summit of Mount Mitsumine after seeing a flier about it. At its foggy summit, Youko is startled by a Brocken specter, nearly losing her footing, before it fades to reveal a sweeping view of the sea and a distant view of Mount Fuji—where their journey began. The sight triggers Youko's memories of life in the shelter, a school-like underground facility hidden beneath an inn, where she and Airi were raised and trained remotely by their "big sister" to survive the outside world. When they were finally allowed to leave, the facility shut down behind them. Unconsciously echoing her sister's wish to see the world, Youko resolves to travel as far as she can as they resume their journey along the Venus Line.

== See also ==
- Super Cub, a light novel series whose spin-off manga was written and illustrated by Sakae Saito
- Katana Maidens: Toji No Miko, an anime television series whose manga adaptation was illustrated by Sakae Saito
