= Truck-kun is Supporting Me from Another World?! =

- Developer: Strange Scaffold
- Publisher: Frosty Pop Games
- Platforms: Windows, Xbox Series X and Series S, Nintendo Switch 2,
- Release: Windows and Xbox Series X & S: July 29, 2026; Nintendo Switch 2: September 14, 2026
- Genre: Racing

Truck-kun is Supporting Me from Another World?! is a 2026 video game developed by Strange Scaffold and published by Frosty Pop Games. The game parodies Japanese isekai media, being about a truck driver who crashes into a woman named Carissa Ward, transporting her into a fantasy world of Talinfold. To help her return home, the driver is required to crash into various people and objects in the city to earn Carissa experience points and monsters to battle.

Truck-kun was released on July 29, 2026 for Windows and Xbox Series X and Series S. It released for Nintendo Switch 2 on September 14, 2026. Reviewers in CG Magazine, Siliconera and Shacknews found the game amusing while noting its short gameplay time and lack of variety in its gameplay.

== Gameplay ==
In Truck-kun is Supporting Me from Another World?!, Carissa Ward becomes a victim of a truck collision death in the streets of Wenvale, USA. This event transforms her into a legendary hero and sends her to the fantastical world of Talinfold. She forms a bond with the guilt-ridden truck driver. They team up to help Carissa thwart the Skeleton King and open a portal back to her home world.

The game is set in a videogame sandbox world, and has the player drive around a metropolitan city. They are tasked with creating as much mayhem in a limited set time to hit as many humans as they can. These characters then spawn in Talinfold as opponents for Carissa to fight for experience points, which is displayed at the bottom of the screen. Hitting other environmental objects, such as other cars, billboards and traffic cones, fills up Carissa's sword gauge to make it possible for her to use a special attack to defeat her spawned foes. Bonus objectives are also present to increase the amount of time to accomplish these goals.

There is both mission mode and a free-roaming mode.

== Development and release ==
Truck-kun is Supporting Me from Another World?! was developed by El Paso, Texas-based Strange Scaffold. The title and theme of the game is in homage to the often longer titles of Japanese isekai light novels, manga, and anime. In these stories, characters are somehow reincarnated into another world where they are reborn as heroes. These titles are often parodied or made into memes such as Truck-kun.

It was published by Frosty Pop Games and released for Microsoft Windows and Xbox Series X and Series S on July 29, 2026. It is scheduled for release for the Nintendo Switch 2 on September 14, 2026.

== Reception ==
Reception

Aggregate scores
| Aggregator | Score |
|---|---|
| Metacritic | (PC) 69/100 (XSX) 69/100 |
| OpenCritic | 42% recommend (Note: Based on 26 reviews) |

Review scores
| Publication | Score |
|---|---|
| Shacknews | 8/10 |
| CG Magazine | 7/10 |
| Siliconera | 7/10 |

The PC and Xbox Series X versions of Truck-kun is Supporting Me from Another World?! both received "mixed or average" reviews from critics, according to the review aggregation website Metacritic. Fellow review aggregator OpenCritic assessed that the game received fair approval, being recommended by 42% of critics.

Reviewers in CG Magazine, Siliconera and Shacknews found the game appropriately light-hearted, fun, and amusing, with Lucas White of the latter publication calling it one of the more memorable games of the year so far.

Reviewers in CG Magazine and Siliconera found the game had a short run time and wished it had more features to collect experience points or more worlds to explore. White found that it struggled to sustain itself at the end despite its short runtime.
