= Nexus (animation studio) =

Japanese animation studio

Nexus Co., Ltd.
- Native name: 株式会社Nexus
- Romanized name: Kabushiki-gaisha Nekusasu
- Type: Kabushiki gaisha
- Industry: Japanese animation
- Founded: 2012
- Headquarters: Shimizu, Suginami, Tokyo, Japan
- Key people: Hiroshi Nakamura (CEO)
- Number of employees: 20
- Website: nexus-sp.co.jp

Nexus Co., Ltd. (Japanese: 株式会社Nexus, Hepburn: Kabushiki-gaisha Nekusasu) is a Japanese animation studio established in 2012 by former A-1 Pictures producer Hiroshi Nakamura.

== Works ==
=== Television series ===
Year	Title	Director(s)	Eps	Note(s)	Ref(s)
2015	Wakaba Girl	Masaharu Watanabe	13	Adaptation of the manga series by Yui Hara.	
2015	Chivalry of a Failed Knight	Shin Oonuma; Jin Tamamura	12	Adaptation of the light novel series by Riku Misora. Co-produced with Silver Link.	
2018	Comic Girls	Yoshinobu Tokumoto	12	Adaptation of the manga series by Kaori Hanzawa.	
2019	Granbelm	Masaharu Watanabe	13	Original work.	
2020	Darwin's Game	Yoshinobu Tokumoto	11	Adaptation of the manga series by FLIPFLOPs.	
2022	The Eminence in Shadow	Kazuya Nakanishi	20	Adaptation of the light novel series by Daisuke Aizawa.	
2023	The Eminence in Shadow 2nd Season	Kazuya Nakanishi	12	Sequel to The Eminence in Shadow.	
2025	Touring After the Apocalypse	Yoshinobu Tokumoto	12	Adaptation of the manga series by Sakae Saito.	

=== Films ===
Year	Title	Director(s)	Note(s)	Ref(s)
2014	Santa Company	Kenji Itoso	Original work. Co-produced with Kenji Studio.	
2027	The Eminence in Shadow: Lost Echoes	Kazuya Nakanishi	Sequel to The Eminence in Shadow 2nd Season.	
