= Truck-kun =

Internet meme

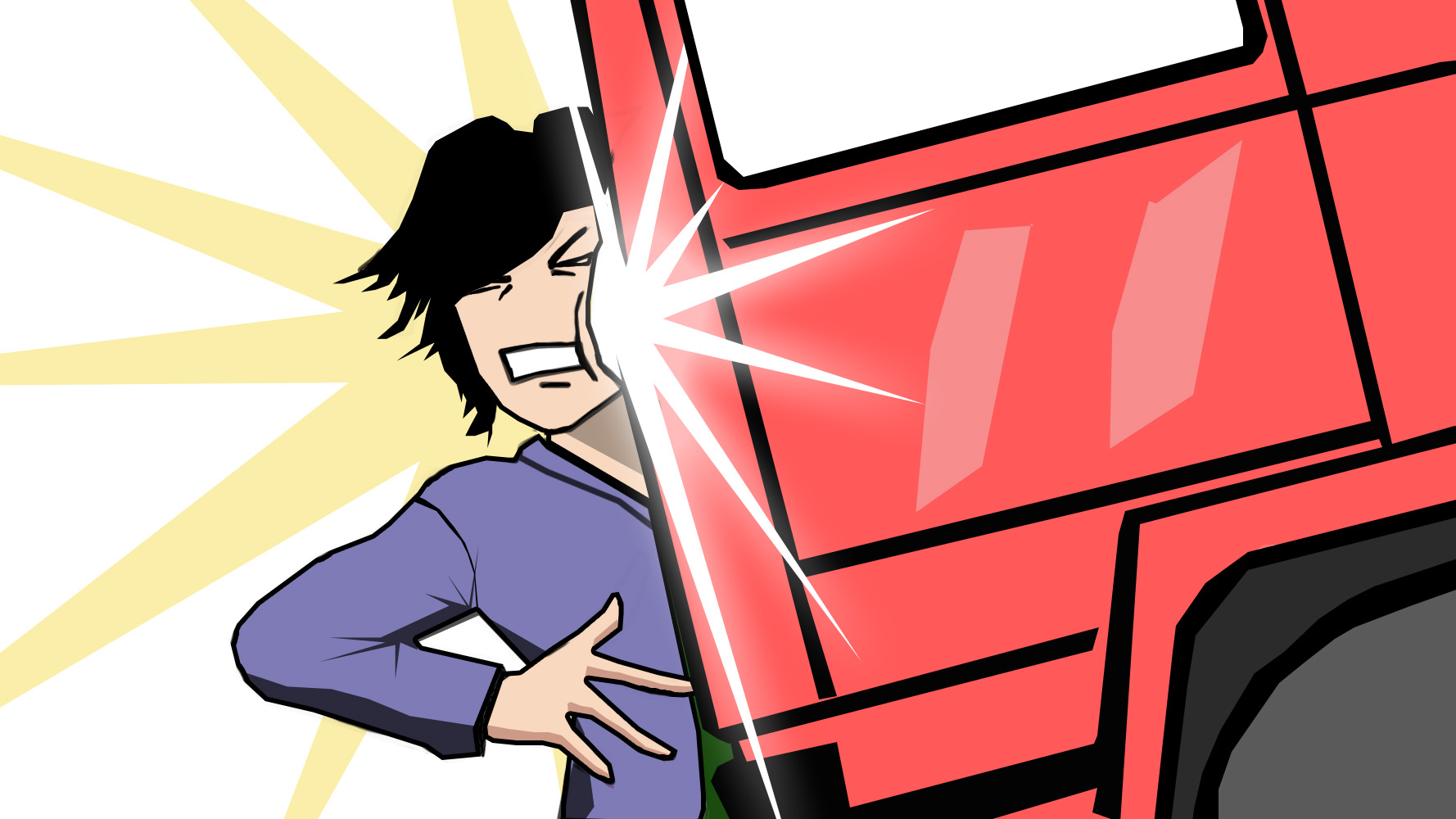
In the isekai genre, the idea of being sent to a new world by being killed by a truck became so common it turned into a meme.

Truck-kun is an Internet meme that refers to a common trope used in the isekai genre of anime, manga, and light novels, in which characters are transported to other worlds. Typically, the protagonists of the isekai anime or manga are sent to these worlds via various methods, including reincarnation after death, and many isekai works have featured characters being transported upon being hit and killed by a truck. After several isekai works featured this as a means to kill their characters, a meme claiming the existence of a character named "Truck-kun" (Note: Kun is a Japanese honorific attached as a suffix to the names of individuals of a junior status relative to the speaker, and is commonly used for boys and male teenagers.) spread. It is purported that Truck-kun's role is to kill people in their original world and subsequently send them to a new one.

== Origins of the meme ==
Early examples of discussion of the trope include a Reddit thread entitled "Trucks in Manga – RE: Marina" by user poloport from April 14, 2015. In the post, a page from the manga RE: Marina shows the central character Rinosuke being hit by a truck. The character is not killed, but the incident brings the main characters in the story together. This post resulted in further posts in which people pointed out examples of trucks running into the protagonists of manga, with isekai manga featuring heavily.

In 2017, an anime fan compiled a list of causes of death among isekai protagonists, which was updated in 2018. Deaths caused by "Traffic accident by truck" came third in the study with 37 cases, with general traffic accidents coming second with 38 cases, and unknown causes first with 102 cases.

== Later developments ==
Critics have since recorded the appearance of "Truck-kun" in multiple series. These include Didn't I Say to Make My Abilities Average in the Next Life?!, Mushoku Tensei, The Eminence in Shadow, Zombie Land Saga, and Wise Man's Grandchild. There are also alternative versions and parodies of the plot device, such as in KonoSuba, where lead character Kazuma Satou dies from shock after rescuing someone from being run over by what he thinks is a truck, but is later discovered to be a slow-moving tractor that posed no danger to the person he was attempting to save. The series most directly referencing the idea is Isekai Transporter, a manga essentially starring Truck-kun.

== Response to the meme ==
Since the creation of the meme, people have retrospectively examined earlier series to see other uses of motor accidents in anime and manga. Examples include Osamu Tezuka's sci-fi manga Astro Boy, in which Tobio Tenma is killed in a car accident at the beginning of the story, resulting in his father creating the robot Astro Boy in his image; as well as the anime series Magical Princess Minky Momo, in which Momo loses her powers and is killed by a truck late in the series before being reincarnated as a baby. Another prominent precursor to this phenomenon that long predates the "isekai boom" in anime is the 1984 fantasy mecha series Aura Battler Dunbine, created by Yoshiyuki Tomino, in which the protagonist is killed in a vehicular altercation while confronting an adversary and transported to another world.

== See also ==
- Life on Mars, a TV series in which the protagonist is sent from 2006 to 1973 after being hit by a car
- Truck-kun is Supporting Me from Another World?!, a video game which uses the trope as part of its core premise
