= Kenichiro Suehiro =

Japanese composer and arranger (born 1980)

Kenichiro Suehiro 末廣 健一郎
- Born: December 27, 1980 (age 45); Saitama, Japan
- Genres: Orchestral; film score; soundtrack
- Occupations: Composer; arranger
- Instruments: Piano; guitar
- Label: ONE MUSIC

Kenichiro Suehiro (末廣 健一郎, Suehiro Kenichirō; born December 27, 1980) is a Japanese composer and arranger, known for his work on many television dramas, anime series, and films. He is currently represented by ONE MUSIC, a music production company.

== Biography ==
Suehiro was born in Saitama. When he was a teenager, he started a band and played as a guitarist, keyboardist, and drummer. He cited Ennio Morricone and Joe Hisaishi as inspiration for him to pursue a composer career.

He studied composition and arrangement under Taro Iwashiro and Akinori Ōsawa. Formerly employed by POPHOLIC, where he worked on anime series, he is now represented by ONE MUSIC and works mainly on television dramas.

== Works ==
=== Anime ===
Year	Title	Note(s)	Ref(s)
2008	Akaneiro ni Somaru Saka		
2013	Line Offline Salaryman		
2013	Line Town		
2015	Osiris no Tenbin		
2016	Space Patrol Luluco		
2016	Re:Zero − Starting Life in Another World		
2016	Osiris no Tenbin 2		
2017	Girls' Last Tour		
2017	How to Keep a Mummy	With MAYUKO	
2018	Comic Girls		
2018	Golden Kamuy		
2018	Cells at Work!	With MAYUKO	
2018	Goblin Slayer		
2018	Re:Zero − Starting Life in Another World − Memory Snow		
2019	Fire Force		
2019	Granbelm		
2019	Re:Zero − Starting Life in Another World − Frozen Bonds		
2020	Goblin Slayer: Goblin's Crown		
2020	Darwin's Game		
2020	Re:Zero − Starting Life in Another World Season 2		
2021	Shadows House		
2022	Shadows House Season 2		
2022	Uncle from Another World		
2022	The Eminence in Shadow		
2022	Love Flops		
2023	Goblin Slayer II		
2023	Butareba: The Story of a Man Turned into a Pig	With MAYUKO	
2023	Undead Unluck		
2024	No Longer Allowed in Another World		
2024	Re:Zero − Starting Life in Another World Season 3		
2024	Suicide Squad Isekai		
2025	Touring After the Apocalypse		
2026	Scum of the Brave		
2026	Daemons of the Shadow Realm		
2026	A Tale of the Secret Saint		
2026	Magical Explorer		

=== Films ===
Year	Title	Note(s)	Ref(s)
2010	Nemuriba		
2012	Ushijima the Loan Shark	With MAYUKO, Kyosuke Kamisaka and Kano Kawashima	
2014	Ushijima the Loan Shark Part 2	With MAYUKO and Kyosuke Kamisaka	
2016	Ushijima the Loan Shark Part 3	With MAYUKO and Kyosuke Kamisaka	
2016	Ushijima the Loan Shark the Final	With MAYUKO and Kyosuke Kamisaka	
2017	Mixed Doubles		
2019	Ninkyo Gakuen		
2025	Make a Girl		

=== Television series ===
Year	Title	Broadcast channel	Note(s)	Ref(s)
2011	Shiawase ni Narou yo	Fuji TV	With MAYUKO, Yugo Kanno, Akio Izutsu and Kyosuke Kamisaka	
2011	The Reason I Can't Find My Love	Fuji TV	With MAYUKO	
2011	Switch Girl!!	Fuji TV Two	With MAYUKO	
2012	Murder at Mt. Fuji	TV Asahi	With Kyosuke Kamisaka	
2012	Kekkon Dousoukai ~Seaside Love~	Fuji TV Two	With MAYUKO	
2012	Kekkon Shinai	Fuji TV	With MAYUKO	
2012	Switch Girl!! 2	Fuji TV Two	With MAYUKO	
2013	Otenki Oneesan	TV Asahi	With Kyosuke Kamisaka	
2013	Town Doctor Jumbo!!	YTV		
2013	Miss Pilot	Fuji TV	With Masahiro Tokuda	
2014	Dr. DMAT	TBS		
2014	Gokuaku Ganbo	Fuji TV	With Masahiro Tokuda and Akihiro Manabe	
2014	Sakura - Jiken wo Kiku Onna	TBS		
2014	Tokubou	NTV		
2014	Cinderella Date	Fuji TV	With Masahiro Tokuda and Akihiro Manabe	
2015	Ghost Writer	Fuji TV	With Masahiro Tokuda, Akihiro Manabe and Megumi Sasano	
2015	Shi no Zouki	WOWOW		
2015	Wakaretara Suki na Hito	Fuji TV	With Masahiro Tokuda	
2015	Okitegami Kyoko no Biboroku	NTV	With Megumi Sasano	
2015	Otona Joshi	Fuji TV	With Akihiro Manabe and MAYUKO	
2016	Hayako-sensei, Kekkon Surutte Hontou desu ka?	Fuji TV	With Akihiro Manabe and MAYUKO	
2016	Juken no Cinderella	NHK BS		
2016	Nigeru wa Haji da ga Yaku ni Tatsu	TBS	With MAYUKO	
2017	Daibinbo	Fuji TV	With Akihiro Manabe and MAYUKO	
2017	Kizoku Tantei	Fuji TV		
2018	Princess Jellyfish	Fuji TV	With MAYUKO	
2018	Cheer☆Dan	TBS	With MAYUKO	
2019	Maison de Police	TBS	With MAYUKO	
2019	Strawberry Night Saga	Fuji TV		
2019	G Senjou no Anata to Watashi	TBS	With MAYUKO	
2020	Keiji to Kenji: Shokatsu to Chiken no 24-ji	TV Asahi	With Masahiro Tokuda and Akihiro Manabe	
2020	Tantei Yuri Rintaro	Fuji TV	With Koji Kikkawa, Masahiro Tokuda and Akihiro Manabe	
2020	Watashi no Kaseifu Nagisa-san	TBS	With MAYUKO	
2021	Renai Mangaka	Fuji TV		
2021	Chef wa Meitantei	TV Tokyo	With Saburo Tanooka	
2021	Konin Todoke ni Han wo Oshita dake desu ga	TBS	With MAYUKO	
2022	Fishbowl Wives	Netflix	With MAYUKO, Yuki Munakata and Yoshihei Ueda	

=== Video games ===
Year	Title	Note(s)	Ref(s)
2023	Wo Long: Fallen Dynasty		

=== Other involvements ===
Year	Title	Artist	Role(s)	Album	Ref(s)
2006	"Kyun Kyun Frill"	Mai Nakahara & Ai Shimizu	Composer	Chronicle	
2007	"Ginger Ale"	YUMAO	Arranger	Clubhouse Sandwich	
2008		Aira Yuuki	Composer; arranger	Sekai no Namida	
2008	"Kage Utsushi"	Mai Nakahara	Arranger	Metronome Egg	
2008	"Mirai no Monogatari"	Chata	Composer; arranger	Chata no Wa	
2009	"Cloudy" and "My Dear ~I want to sing for you~"	yozuca*	Composer; arranger	piece	
2010	"rebirth"	Miyuki Hashimoto	Arranger	se Kirara	
2015	"Mirai e no Omamori"		Arranger	D.C. ~Da Capo~ Super Best	
