= OxT =

Japanese musical group signed to Pony Canyon and Kadokawa

- Origin: Japan
- Genres: J-pop; anison
- Years active: 2015–present
- Labels: Pony Canyon (2015–present); Media Factory (2015–present)
- Members: Masayoshi Ōishi (vocals); Tom-H@ck (guitar, composer)
- Website: www.oxt-music.com

OxT (Japanese: [oꜜkɯ̥to]) is a Japanese musical group signed to Pony Canyon and Kadokawa. It consists of vocalist Masayoshi Ōishi and guitarist Tomohiro Ōshima (大嶋 文博, Ōshima Tomohiro; born May 13, 1985), known professionally as Tom Hack (stylized as Tom-H@ck). The unit debuted in 2013, after the two had previously collaborated for the anime television series Ace of Diamond. Their music has also been featured in series such as Overlord, Prince of Stride, Hand Shakers, SSSS.Gridman and The Eminence in Shadow.

== History ==
Ōishi and Tom Hack first collaborated in 2013, when they worked on the song "Go Exceed", which was used as the first opening theme to the anime television series Ace of Diamond. They would collaborate again the following year with the song "Perfect Hero", which was used as the second opening theme to Ace of Diamond. Both songs were credited as "Tom Hack featuring Masayoshi Ōishi".

In 2015, Ōishi and Tom Hack formed the group OxT; the group's name is pronounced "okuto" in Japanese. OxT's first release was the single "Kimero!!" which came out on May 20, 2015; the title track is used as the second ending theme to the second season of Ace of Diamond. Their second single "Clattanoia" was released on August 26, 2015; its title track was used as the opening theme to the anime series Overlord. Their third single "Bloom of Youth" was released on November 11, 2015; the title track is used as the second ending theme to the second season of Ace of Diamond. Their fourth single "Strider's High" was released on February 3, 2016; its title track is used as the opening theme to the anime series Prince of Stride. They released a collection of their songs used in Ace of Diamond on March 2, 2016.

In January 2017, OxT released the CD "Be The Best! Be The Blue!/Tears of a Genius" which were used in a stage play adaptation of Ace of Diamond. This was followed by the release of their fifth single "One Hand Message" on January 25, 2017; the title track is used as the opening theme to the anime series Hand Shakers. Their next release was their sixth single "Number One" which came out on January 17, 2018; the title track was used in the Ace of Diamond stage play.

OxT's seventh single "GO CRY GO" was released on January 24, 2018; the title track is used as the opening theme to the second season of Overlord. This was followed by the release of their eighth single "Silent Solitude" on August 8, 2018; the title track is used as the ending theme to the third season of Overlord. They released their first album Hello New World on September 23, 2018. Their ninth single "Union" was released on November 7, 2018; the title track is used as the opening to the anime series SSSS.Gridman. They released their 10th single "Golden After School" on April 17, 2019; the title track is used as the ending theme to the anime series Ace of Diamond: Act II. On February 5, 2020, the band released their 11th single "Everlasting Dream", the title track was used as the fourth ending theme to the anime series Ace of Diamond: Act II. On July 27 2022, they released their 12th single "HOLLOW HUNGER"; the title track is used as the opening theme to the anime series Overlord season 4. In August 2022, it was announced that the band will perform the opening theme to the anime series The Eminence in Shadow. Their 13th single "Highest" was released on October 26, 2022. On September 24 2024, they released their 14th single "WHEELER-DEALER"; the title track is used as the ending theme to the anime movie Overlord Movie 3: The Sacred Kingdom.

== Discography ==
=== Albums ===
Title	Album details	Peak chart positions	
Title	Album details	JPN Oricon	JPN Billboard
OxT Complete Songs "Ace of Diamond"	Released: March 2, 2016; Label: Pony Canyon; Formats: CD, digital download	46	36
Hello New World	Released: September 12, 2018; Label: Kadokawa; Formats: CD, digital download	23	19
Reunion	Released: September 10, 2020; Label: Pony Canyon; Formats: CD, digital download	22	24

=== Singles ===
Title	Year	Peak positions	Sales	Certifications	Notes	Album
Title	Year	JPN Oricon	Sales	Certifications	Notes	Album
"Kimero!!"	2015	68			1st ED theme of the anime Ace of Diamond Season 2.	OxT Complete Songs "Ace of Diamond"
"Clattanoia"	2015	28			OP theme of the anime Overlord Season 1.	Hello New World
"Bloom of Youth"	2015	51			2nd ED theme of the anime Ace of Diamond Season 2.	OxT Complete Songs "Ace of Diamond"
"Strider's High"	2016	31			OP theme of the anime Prince of Stride: Alternative.	Hello New World
"Be The Best! Be The Blue! / Tears of a Genius"	2017	116				Reunion
"One Hand Message"	2017	69			OP theme of the anime Hand Shakers.	Hello New World
"Number One"	2018	—				Reunion
"Go Cry Go"	2018	40			OP theme of the anime Overlord Season 2.	Hello New World
"Silent Solitude"	2018	49			ED theme of the anime Overlord Season 3.	Non-album single
"Union"	2018	15	JPN: 100,000+	RIAJ: Gold	OP theme of the anime SSSS.Gridman.	Reunion
"Golden After School"	2019	47			1st ED theme of the anime Ace of Diamond Season 3.	Reunion
"Everlasting Dream"	2020	44			2nd ED theme of the anime Ace of Diamond Season 3.	Reunion
"Hollow Hunger"	2022	43	JPN: 1,749 (Phy.); JPN: 34,662 (Dig.)		OP theme of the anime Overlord Season 4.	Non-album singles
"Highest"	2022	67	JPN: 4,635 (Dig.)		OP theme of the anime The Eminence in Shadow.	Non-album singles

==== Digital singles ====
Title	Year	Peak positions		Sales	Certifications	Annotations	Album
Title	Year	JPN Dig.	JPN DL	Sales	Certifications	Annotations	Album
"Grayscale dominator"	2023	48	43	JPN: 1,326 (Dig.)		OP theme of the anime The Eminence in Shadow Season 2.	Non-album singles
"Wheeler-Dealer"	2024	26	27	JPN: 1,713 (Dig.)		Theme song of the anime movie Overlord: The Sacred Kingdom.	Non-album singles
"Road to the blue"	2026	—	—			ED theme of the anime Ace of the Diamond act II Season 2.	Non-album singles

== See also ==
- Myth & Roid – another musical group with Tom-H@ck as a member.
