= The Eminence in Shadow =

Japanese light novel series and its adaptations

- First light novel volume cover, featuring (from left to right) Alpha, Beta, Cid Kagenou, Gamma, and Delta

陰の実力者になりたくて！ (Kage no Jitsuryokusha ni Naritakute!)
- Genre: Dark fantasy; Fantasy comedy; Isekai
- Novel series
- Written by: Daisuke Aizawa
- Published by: Shōsetsuka ni Narō
- Original run: May 2018 – present
- Light novel
- Written by: Daisuke Aizawa
- Illustrated by: Tōzai
- Published by: Enterbrain
- English publisher: NA: Yen Press
- Original run: November 5, 2018 – present
- Volumes: 7
- Manga
- Written by: Daisuke Aizawa
- Illustrated by: Anri Sakano
- Published by: Kadokawa Shoten
- English publisher: NA: Yen Press
- Magazine: Comp Ace
- Original run: December 26, 2018 – present
- Volumes: 18
- Manga

Kage no Jitsuryokusha ni Naritakute! Shadow Gaiden
- Written by: Seta U
- Published by: Kadokawa Shoten
- Magazine: Comp Ace
- Original run: July 26, 2019 – September 26, 2023
- Volumes: 6
- Anime television series
- Directed by: Kazuya Nakanishi
- Written by: Kanichi Katou
- Music by: Kenichiro Suehiro
- Studio: Nexus
- Licensed by: AU: Sugoi Co; NA: Sentai Filmworks (Note: Home video rights through Section23 Films and streaming rights via Hidive.); UK: Anime Limited
- Original network: AT-X, Tokyo MX, KBS Kyoto, SUN, BS NTV, TV Aichi
- Original run: October 5, 2022 – December 20, 2023
- Episodes: 32
- Video game

The Eminence in Shadow: Master of Garden
- Developer: Aiming
- Publisher: JPN: Aiming; WW: Crunchyroll Games
- Genre: Role-playing; Gacha
- Platform: iOS; Android; Windows
- Released: November 29, 2022
- Manga

Kage no Jitsuryokusha ni Naritakute! Master of Garden: Shichikage Retsuden
- Written by: Kanco
- Published by: Kadokawa Shoten
- Magazine: KadoComi
- Original run: May 28, 2024 – present
- Volumes: 4
- Anime film
- The Eminence in Shadow: Lost Echoes (2027)
- icon

The Eminence in Shadow (Japanese: 陰の実力者になりたくて!, Hepburn: Kage no Jitsuryokusha ni Naritakute!) is a Japanese light novel series written by Daisuke Aizawa and illustrated by Tōzai. It began serialization online in May 2018 on the user-generated novel publishing website Shōsetsuka ni Narō. It was later acquired by Enterbrain, who have published the series since November 2018.

A manga adaptation with art by Anri Sakano has been serialized in Kadokawa Shoten's seinen manga magazine Comp Ace since December 2018. A spin-off manga by Seta U, titled Kage no Jitsuryokusha ni Naritakute! Shadow Gaiden, was also serialized via Comp Ace from July 2019 to September 2023. A second spin-off manga by Kanco, titled Kage no Jitsuryokusha ni Naritakute! Master of Garden: Shichikage Retsuden, started serialization via Comic Walker in May 2024. Both the light novel and main manga have been licensed in North America by Yen Press.

An anime television series adaptation produced by Nexus aired from October 2022 to February 2023. A second season aired from October to December 2023. An anime film, titled The Eminence in Shadow: Lost Echoes, is set to open in 2027.

== Premise ==
In modern-day Japan, a boy named Minoru Kageno aspires to be a mastermind, exerting power from the shadows. During his secret training, an unforeseen accident occurs when he gets hit by a truck, leading to his untimely demise. To his surprise, he finds himself reborn in a fantastical realm as Cid Kagenou. Here, he decides to maintain a facade of mediocrity, intentionally avoiding the limelight while secretly nurturing his dream of orchestrating power from behind the scenes.

As Cid goes about his life in this new world, he encounters an elven girl suffering from a mysterious illness. Putting his acquired knowledge to use, Cid successfully cures her. Seizing the opportunity, he weaves a tale for the elf, now named Alpha, claiming that this world is under the control of the nefarious Cult of Diablos. Cid, under the guise of Shadow, the leader of the secret organization Shadow Garden, assures Alpha that they possess the means to defeat the cult and restore peace to the land.

With a newfound purpose, Alpha becomes an enthusiastic member of Shadow Garden, taking on the role of a recruiter and aiding Cid in expanding their influence. Unbeknownst to her, Cid's fabricated power struggle is not mere fiction; it is a reality that he, as Shadow, is now actively engaged in. Under the alias, he navigates the complex web of political intrigue and magical conflicts, fighting against the very forces he had initially only pretended existed.

As Shadow, Cid finds himself increasingly entangled in the conflicts of the fantasy world, with the lines between his fabricated story and the actual struggles blurring. The once-aspiring mastermind now faces the challenge of living up to the role he created and leading Shadow Garden in the fight against the genuine threats posed by the Cult of Diablos.

== Media ==
=== Light novel ===
The series is written by Daisuke Aizawa and illustrated by Tōzai. It began serialization online in May 2018 on the user-generated novel publishing website Shōsetsuka ni Narō. It was acquired by Enterbrain in November 2018, who have published seven volumes. Yen Press licensed the series for English publication.

No.	Original release date	Original ISBN	English release date	English ISBN
1	November 5, 2018	978-4-04-735302-2	August 11, 2020	978-1-9753-5906-5
Prologue: "Preparing the Perfect Stage!"; Chapter 1: "Starting the Shadowbroker Tutorial!"; Chapter 2: "Assuming the Role of a Side Character at School!"; Chapter 3: "My Official Beginning as a Mastermind in Action!"; Chapter 4: "The Two Sides of the Shadow Garden?!"; Chapter 5: "Mastering the Peaceful Life of a Nobody!"; Chapter 6: "The Scene Where Terrorists Take Over the School"; Final Chapter: "My Idea of the Ultimate Shadow Commander!"; "The Chronicles of Master Shadow Complete Version: Volume 1"
2	March 5, 2019	978-4-04-735580-4	November 10, 2020	978-1-9753-8699-3
Prologue: "To Lindwurm, the Sacred Land!"; Chapter 1: "Fun Times at the Goddess's Trial!"; Chapter 2: "Investigating the Sanctuary!"; Chapter 3: "When Things Get Boring, It's Time for Explosives!"; Chapter 4: "This Situation Calls for a "Who Is That Guy?!"; Chapter 5: "A Battle to Attract Only MVPs!"; Chapter 6: "A Mastermind Always Plays Piano Under Moonlight!"; Chapter 7: "Showing Off a Smidgen of My Strength!"; Chapter 8: "Lay Your Eyes on My True Powers!"; Final Chapter: "Just Who Is This Mysterious Badass?!"; "The Chronicles of Master Shadow Complete Version: Volume 2"
3	July 26, 2019	978-4-04-735711-2	April 27, 2021	978-1-9753-1578-8
Prologue: "Heading to the Lawless City over Fall Break!"; Chapter 1: "Lawless City Bandit Hunting!"; Chapter 2: "Storming the Crimson Tower!"; Chapter 3: "Pursuing the Blood Queen!"; Auxiliary Chapter: "Field Notes on a Little Brother — by Young Claire!"; Chapter 4: "I'll Destroy It All and Start from Scratch!"; Chapter 5: "Printing Fake Money as Mitsugoshi Throws Down with the Major Corporate Alliance!"; Chapter 6: "Circulating Counterfeit Cash!"; Epilogue: "The One to Destroy It All and Start from Scratch — with Fake Bills!"; "The Chronicles of Master Shadow Complete Version: Volume 3"
4	February 26, 2021	978-4-04-735878-2	June 7, 2022	978-1-9753-4184-8
Prologue: "It's Time for a War in the Oriana Kingdom!"; Chapter 1: "Putting the Kibosh on Rose Oriana's Wedding!"; Chapter 2: "Begin Operation: "Obstruction!"; Chapter 3: "Crashing the Ceremony!"; Auxiliary Chapter: "Rise of the Fancy Hoodlum Slayer!"; Chapter 4: "Lurking in the Darkness in Fantastical Japan!"; Chapter 5: "Sneaking Around in Japan, Just Like the Old Days!!"; Chapter 6: "Something Smells Fishy… But an Eminence in Shadow Always Cracks the Case!"; Epilogue: "Behold, a Full-Fledged Eminence in Shadow!"; "The Chronicles of Master Shadow Complete Version: Volume 4"
5	December 28, 2022	978-4-04-737311-2	July 23, 2024	978-1-9753-7525-6
Prologue: "The Case of the Missing Students and the Not-So-Peaceful Academy!"; Chapter 1: "Claire's Back, and Her Symptoms Are Worse Than Ever!"; Chapter 2: "Morning Comes, and There's an Impaler on the Loose!!"; Chapter 3: "The Case Is Closed, So It's Time for a Flashback!"; Chapter 4: "Peace in Our Time!"; Chapter 5: "Terrorists Attack the School…Again!!"; Epilogue: "I'd Let the Whole World Burn, If That's What It Took!"; "The Chronicles of Master Shadow Complete Version: Volume 5"
6	October 30, 2023	978-4-04-737691-5	February 4, 2025	979-8-8554-0698-6
Prologue: "There Are People Ruling the Midgar Kingdom from the Shadows? I'm So Jealous!"; Chapter 1: "Enter Jack the Ripper!"; Chapter 2: "Assassins at the Sleepover!"; Chapter 3: "Deciphering the Calling Card!"; Chapter 4: "The Monster Becomes a Legend!"; Auxiliary Chapter: "Following in the Monster's Footsteps!"; Side Story: "The Grassland Vow"; Chapter 5: "Welcome to the Shadow Garden!"; Epilogue: "That Nostalgic Smell"
7	April 1, 2026	978-4-04-738290-9	March 9, 2027	979-8-8554-4722-4

=== Manga ===
A manga adaptation with art by Anri Sakano began serialization in Kadokawa Shoten's seinen manga magazine Comp Ace on December 26, 2018. It has been collected in 18 tankōbon volumes. Yen Press also licensed the manga adaptation.

No.	Original release date	Original ISBN	English release date	English ISBN
1	July 25, 2019	978-4-04-108471-7	November 23, 2021	978-1-9753-2518-3
2	September 24, 2019	978-4-04-108683-4	December 7, 2021	978-1-9753-2520-6
3	June 25, 2020	978-4-04-109326-9	March 22, 2022	978-1-9753-2522-0
4	August 25, 2020	978-4-04-109332-0	July 5, 2022	978-1-9753-3876-3
5	February 26, 2021	978-4-04-111002-7	October 4, 2022	978-1-9753-3878-7
6	June 25, 2021	978-4-04-111564-0	February 21, 2023	978-1-9753-4272-2
7	March 26, 2022	978-4-04-111565-7	July 18, 2023	978-1-9753-6295-9
8	September 26, 2022	978-4-04-112936-4	November 21, 2023	978-1-9753-7091-6
9	October 25, 2022	978-4-04-112937-1	March 19, 2024	978-1-9753-7221-7
10	November 25, 2022	978-4-04-112938-8	July 23, 2024	978-1-9753-7685-7
11	May 26, 2023	978-4-04-113684-3	December 10, 2024	978-1-9753-9387-8
12	October 26, 2023	978-4-04-113685-0	April 22, 2025	979-8-8554-0825-6
13	May 24, 2024	978-4-04-114968-3	September 23, 2025	979-8-8554-1675-6
14	November 25, 2024	978-4-04-115574-5	April 28, 2026	979-8-8554-2313-6
15	February 26, 2025	978-4-04-115857-9	September 22, 2026	979-8-8554-2781-3
16	July 25, 2025	978-4-04-116209-5	January 26, 2027	979-8-8554-4774-3
17	November 26, 2025	978-4-04-116743-4	—	—
18	May 25, 2026	978-4-04-117387-9	—	—
19	November 25, 2026	978-4-04-117877-5	—	—

==== Spin-offs ====
A spin-off manga by Seta U, titled Kage no Jitsuryokusha ni Naritakute! Shadow Gaiden (陰の実力者になりたくて！ しゃどーがいでん; "The Eminence in Shadow! Shadow Side Story"), was also serialized via Comp Ace from July 26, 2019, to September 26, 2023. It has been collected in six tankōbon volumes.

No.	Japanese release date	Japanese ISBN
1	June 25, 2020	978-4-04-109327-6
2	February 26, 2021	978-4-04-109333-7
3	March 26, 2022	978-4-04-112378-2
4	October 25, 2022	978-4-04-113040-7
5	May 26, 2023	978-4-04-113688-1
6	October 26, 2023	978-4-04-113689-8

A second spin-off manga by Kanco, titled Kage no Jitsuryokusha ni Naritakute! Master of Garden: Shichikage Retsuden (陰の実力者になりたくて！マスターオブガーデン～七陰列伝～; "The Eminence in Shadow: Master of Garden – Seven Shadows Chronicles"), began serialization on May 28, 2024, via Kadokawa Shoten's "Comic Walker" website. The manga serves as an adaptation of The Eminence in Shadow: Master of Garden video game. The manga's chapters have been collected in four tankōbon volumes.

No.	Japanese release date	Japanese ISBN
1	November 25, 2024	978-4-04-115577-6
2	July 25, 2025	978-4-04-116208-8
3	February 25, 2026	978-4-04-117073-1
4	September 25, 2026	978-4-04-117675-7

=== Anime ===
An anime television series adaptation was announced on the fourth volume of the light novel on February 26, 2021. The series is produced by Nexus and directed by Kazuya Nakanishi, with scripts written by Kanichi Katou, character designs by Makoto Iino, and music composed by Kenichiro Suehiro. It aired from October 5, 2022, to February 15, 2023, on AT-X and other networks. The opening theme is "Highest" by OxT, while the ending theme is "Darling in the Night" by Asami Seto, Inori Minase, Suzuko Mimori, Fairouz Ai, Hisako Kanemoto, Ayaka Asai, and Reina Kondō.

A second season was announced during a livestream on February 22, 2023, with the main staff returning from the previous season. It was broadcast for 12 episodes from October 4 to December 20, 2023. The opening theme is "Grayscale Dominator" by OxT, while the ending theme song is "Polaris in the Night" by Ikumi Hasegawa, Maaya Uchida, Mayu Minami, and Ryōko Maekawa.

On June 13, 2025, it was announced that the characters from The Eminence in Shadow will be featured in a third season of Isekai Quartet, a chibi-style anime crossover series featuring characters from Kadokawa Corporation's franchises in the isekai genre.

Sentai Filmworks licensed the series for a North American release, streaming it on Hidive.

==== Film ====
An anime film, titled The Eminence in Shadow: Lost Echoes (劇場版 陰の実力者になりたくて！残響編, Kage no Jitsuryokusha ni Naritakute!: Zankyō-hen), was announced in December 2023. It is set to open in Japanese theaters in 2027.

=== Video games ===
A role-playing video game developed by Aiming, titled The Eminence in Shadow: Master of Garden (陰の実力者になりたくて！マスターオブガーデン, Kage no Jitsuryokusha ni Naritakute! Masutā obu Gāden), was released for Android, iOS, and Windows on November 29, 2022. Crunchyroll Games launched the game worldwide on Android and iOS on the same day. The Windows version launched worldwide on May 25, 2023, with support for cross-platform play and progression.

In 2026, Aiming announced a rogue-lite action game, titled The Eminence in Shadow: Phantom Echoes, set to be released for PlayStation 5, Nintendo Switch 2, and Windows in 2027.

== Reception ==
By October 2022, the series had a cumulative total of 2 million copies in circulation; over 3.5 million copies in circulation by December 2022; over 4 million copies in circulation by February 2023; over 5 million copies in circulation by September 2023; over 6 million copies in circulation by May 2024; over 6.5 million copies in circulation by April 2025; and over 8 million copies sold by September 2026.

The first Blu-ray volume sold 2,327 copies in its first week of debut; the second volume sold 2,499 copies in its first week.

== See also ==
- My Status as an Assassin Obviously Exceeds the Hero's, another light novel series illustrated by Tōzai
- Saving 80,000 Gold in Another World for My Retirement, another light novel series illustrated by Tōzai
