= Natalie Rial =

American voice actress

- Born: Natalie Michele Rial; January 29, 1996 (age 30); Houston, Texas, U.S.
- Education: University of Houston
- Occupation: Voice actress
- Years active: 2013–present
- Relatives: Monica Rial (half-sister); Miguel Rial (half-brother)

Natalie Michele Rial (born January 29, 1996) is an American voice actress who has provided voices for English dubbed Japanese anime and video games. She is known for her roles as Momo Belia Deviluke in To Love Ru, Rui Tachibana in Domestic Girlfriend, Nazuna Nanakusa in Call of the Night and Kana Arima in Oshi no Ko. Natalie is the younger sister of Monica Rial who is also a voice actress.

== Biography ==
Natalie Michele Rial was born on January 29, 1996. Rial's elder half-sister is Monica Rial along with her biological father, Manuel, is from Pontevedra, Galicia, Spain. Natalie also has a half-brother, Miguel. Both her and Monica have voiced in anime dubs.

She made her debut in the business in 2013 when she voiced Nekonya in Girls und Panzer.

== Filmography ==
=== Anime television series ===
Year	Title	Role	Notes	Source
2013	Girls und Panzer	Nekonya	Debut role	
2014	Girls und Panzer OVA	Nekonya		
2016	Aoharu x Machinegun	Maid		
2017	Amagi Brilliant Park	Biino Bando		
2017	Chivalry of a Failed Knight	Mangetsu Tsukuyomi		
2017	Diabolik Lovers More, Blood	Justin (young)		
2017	School-Live!	Takae Yuzumura		
2018	Kakegurui	Midari Ikishima	Sentai Studios-dubbed version	
2019	Domestic Girlfriend	Rui Tachibana		
2019	Golden Time	Shi		
2019	My Teen Romantic Comedy SNAFU	Hina Ebina		
2019	My Teen Romantic Comedy SNAFU TOO!	Hina Ebina		
2019	Waiting in the Summer	Chiharu Arisawa		
2020	BanG Dream!	Kokoro Tsurumaki	Second season	
2020	My Teen Romantic Comedy SNAFU Climax	Hina Ebina		
2020	Shirobako	Yumi Iguchi		
2020	The Pet Girl of Sakurasou	Shiho Fukaya; Hikari		
2021	Food Wars! Shokugeki no Soma: The Fourth Plate	Courage		
2021	Kageki Shojo!!	Chiaki Sawada		
2021	Mother of the Goddess' Dormitory	Serene Hozumi		
2021	Motto To Love Ru	Momo Belia Deviluke		
2021	To Love Ru Darkness	Momo Belia Deviluke		
2021	To Love Ru Darkness 2nd	Momo Belia Deviluke		
2022–present	Call of the Night	Nazuna Nanakusa		
2022	Food Wars! Shokugeki no Soma: The Fifth Plate	Courage		
2022	Shenmue: The Animation	Shenhua		
2022	The Eminence in Shadow	Akane Nishino		
2023	Oshi no Ko	Kana Arima		
2023	Dark Gathering	Yayoi Hozuki		
2023	The Dangers in My Heart	Honoka Hara		
2023	Love Flops	Aoi Izumizawa; Ai Aizwa		
2023	The Vexations of a Shut-In Vampire Princess	Millicent Bluenight		
2024	The Demon Sword Master of Excalibur Academy	Fenris Edelritz		
2024	Chained Soldier	Himari Azuma		
2024	Level 1 Demon Lord and One Room Hero	Zenia		
2024	I Parry Everything	Mianne		
2024	Jellyfish Can't Swim in the Night	Mei Takanashi		
2024	Insomniacs After School	Haya		
2025	Loner Life in Another World	Gal D		
2025	2.5 Dimensional Seduction	Cosplayer Gray		
2025	Rock Is a Lady's Modesty	Otoha Kurogane		
2025	Yandere Dark Elf: She Chased Me All the Way From Another World!	Mariebell		

=== Anime films ===
Year	Title	Role	Notes	Source
2016	Girls und Panzer der Film	Nekonya		
2024	My Hero Academia: You're Next	Satsuki Asui; Samidare Asui		
