= My Youth Romantic Comedy Is Wrong, as I Expected =

Japanese light novel series franchise

- Cover of the first light novel volume, featuring Hachiman Hikigaya and Yukino Yukinoshita

やはり俺の青春ラブコメはまちがっている。 (Yahari Ore no Seishun Rabukome wa Machigatteiru)
- Genre: Romantic comedy; Slice of life
- Light novel
- Written by: Wataru Watari
- Illustrated by: Ponkan 8
- Published by: Shogakukan
- English publisher: NA: Yen Press
- Imprint: Gagaga Bunko
- Original run: March 18, 2011 – April 20, 2021
- Volumes: 14 + 4 short story volumes
Further information
Manga
My Youth Romantic Comedy Is Wrong, as I Expected -Monologue-
Written by	Rechi Kazuki
Published by	Square Enix
Magazine	Big Gangan
Original run	September 25, 2012 – April 25, 2023
Volumes	22
Manga
My Youth Romantic Comedy Is Wrong, as I Expected @ comic
Written by	Naomichi Io
Published by	Shogakukan
English publisher	NA: Yen Press
Magazine	Monthly Sunday Gene-X
Original run	December 19, 2012 – February 17, 2023
Volumes	22
Manga
Yahari 4-koma demo Ore no Seishun Rabu Kome wa Machigatteiru
Written by	Yūta Taneda
Published by	Ichijinsha
Magazine	Manga 4-koma Palette
Original run	April 22, 2013 – June 22, 2015
Volumes	2
Anime television series
My Teen Romantic Comedy SNAFU
Directed by	Ai Yoshimura
Produced by	Hajime Maruyama; Junichirō Tanaka; Kozue Kaneniwa; Kentarō Hattori
Written by	Shōtarō Suga
Music by	Kakeru Ishihama (Monaca)
Studio	Brain's Base
Licensed by	AUS: Madman Entertainment; NA: Sentai Filmworks; SEA: Medialink; UK: Animatsu Entertainment (expired)
Original network	TBS, MBS, CBC TV, BS-TBS
English network	NA: Anime Network; SEA: Animax Asia
Original run	April 5, 2013 – June 28, 2013
Episodes	13 + OVA
Video game
Yahari Game demo Ore no Seishun Rabukome wa Machigatteiru
Developer	5pb.
Publisher	5pb.
Genre	Visual novel
Platform	PlayStation Vita, PlayStation 4, Nintendo Switch
Released	September 19, 2013: PlayStation Vita; JP: September 19, 2013 PlayStation 4; JP: October 26, 2017 Nintendo Switch; JP: September 22, 2022
Anime television series
My Teen Romantic Comedy SNAFU Too!
Directed by	Kei Oikawa
Produced by	Junichirō Tanaka; Yōhei Hayashi; Kazuaki Takahashi; Takumi Kohama
Written by	Shōtarō Suga
Music by	Kakeru Ishihama (Monaca); Kuniyuki Takahashi (Monaca)
Studio	Feel
Licensed by	AUS: Madman Entertainment; NA: Sentai Filmworks; SEA: Medialink; UK: Animatsu Entertainment
Original network	TBS, MBS, CBC TV, TUT, MBS, BS-TBS
English network	NA: Anime Network
Original run	April 3, 2015 – June 26, 2015
Episodes	13 + OVA
Video game
Yahari Game demo Ore no Seishun Rabukome wa Machigatteiru Zoku
Developer	5pb.
Publisher	5pb.
Genre	Visual novel
Platform	PlayStation Vita, PlayStation 4, Nintendo Switch
Released	October 27, 2016: PlayStation Vita; JP: October 27, 2016 PlayStation 4; JP: October 26, 2017 Nintendo Switch; JP: September 22, 2022
Anime television series
My Teen Romantic Comedy SNAFU Climax
Directed by	Kei Oikawa
Produced by	Junichirō Tanaka; Masazumi Katō; Kazuaki Takahashi; Yoshinori Hasegawa
Written by	Keiichirō Ōchi
Music by	Kakeru Ishihama (Monaca); Kuniyuki Takahashi (Monaca)
Studio	Feel
Licensed by	Sentai Filmworks: SEA: Medialink
Original network	TBS, MBS, CBC, BS-TBS
Original run	July 9, 2020 – September 24, 2020
Episodes	12 + OVA
Video game
Yahari Game demo Ore no Seishun Rabukome wa Machigatteiru Kan
Developer	5pb.
Publisher	5pb.
Genre	Visual novel
Platform	PlayStation 4, Nintendo Switch
Released	JP: April 27, 2023
- icon

My Youth Romantic Comedy Is Wrong, as I Expected (Japanese: やはり俺の青春ラブコメはまちがっている。, Hepburn: Yahari Ore no Seishun Rabukome wa Machigatteiru), abbreviated as Oregairu (俺ガイル) and Hamachi (はまち), and also known as My Teen Romantic Comedy SNAFU, is a Japanese light novel series written by Wataru Watari and illustrated by Ponkan 8. The series follows Hachiman Hikigaya, a pessimistic, closeminded, and realistic teen, who is forced by his teacher to join the school's service club and work with two girls with issues of their own. They offer help and advice to others while dealing with their inner conflicts.

There are three manga adaptations and two anthology volumes. It has been adapted into an anime television series, which aired between April and June 2013 and was followed by a second season which aired between April and June 2015, as well as a third and final season which aired between July and September 2020. Yahari Game demo Ore no Seishun Rabukome wa Machigatteiru, a video game, was released by 5pb. for the PlayStation Vita in September 2013. A second video game also by 5pb was released in October 2016. Both games were bundled together in a release for the PlayStation 4 in October 2017 and for the Nintendo Switch in October 2022. A third video game was released for PlayStation 4 and Nintendo Switch in April 2023.

== Plot ==
The story follows two loners, the pragmatic Hachiman Hikigaya and beautiful Yukino Yukinoshita, who despite their varying personalities and ideals, offer help and advice to others as part of their school's Service Club, assisted by the cheerful and friendly Yui Yuigahama. It largely depicts various social situations faced by teens in a high school setting and the psychology driving their interactions.

== Characters ==
=== Main characters ===
Hachiman Hikigaya (比企谷 八幡, Hikigaya Hachiman)
Voiced by: Takuya Eguchi (Japanese); Adam Gibbs (English)
A cynical and isolated student in class 2F of Sōbu High School, ostracized due to his aloof demeanor and "dead fish-eyes." His social exclusion has made him highly observant, allowing him to see through people's facades. He dismisses youthful idealism as hypocrisy, shaped by past failures. His teacher, Shizuka, forces him into the Service Club to prevent further alienation. After rescuing Yui's puppy on his first day, a car accident leaves him hospitalized for weeks, reinforcing his outsider status. He initially rejects Yui's kindness, believing it stems from guilt, and distances himself from Yukino upon learning her family's car caused the accident. Both misunderstandings are later resolved. Though aware of their feelings, he questions their sincerity before ultimately confessing to Yukino.
Yukino Yukinoshita (雪ノ下 雪乃, Yukinoshita Yukino)
Voiced by: Saori Hayami (Japanese); Melissa Molano (English)
A brilliant but cold student in class 2J and the sole president of the Service Club before Hachiman joins. Coming from a wealthy family, she is admired for her beauty and intellect but resented by peers, earning her the nickname "Ice-cold Beauty." She initially treats Hachiman with indifference, though she gradually softens toward him. Believing the capable have a duty to guide others, she helps people with blunt honesty, often criticizing their flaws. Her sharp demeanor alienates most, though Yui's persistent kindness eventually makes them close friends. Yukino recognizes Hachiman from the accident involving her family's car but conceals it, and is deeply hurt when he withdraws after learning the truth. Over time, she develops feelings for him and ultimately accepts his confession, beginning a relationship.
Yui Yuigahama (由比ヶ浜 結衣, Yuigahama Yui)
Voiced by: Nao Tōyama (Japanese); Cat Thomas (English)
A cheerful and sociable classmate of Hachiman who first approaches the Service Club for help baking cookies. Unlike her more cynical peers, she struggles with self-expression, fearing rejection, and admires Yukino and Hachiman for their honesty. Initially believing talent is innate, she later adopts Yukino's perspective through their friendship. Though part of Hayato's social circle, she often defers to Yumiko. She develops feelings for Hachiman after he saves her dog, but upon realizing his affection for Yukino, she suppresses her emotions and supports their relationship. Despite confessing and being rejected, her unresolved feelings persist, acknowledged by Iroha and Komachi even as Hachiman and Yukino grow closer.

=== Class 2F ===
Saika Totsuka (戸塚 彩加, Totsuka Saika)
Voiced by: Mikako Komatsu (Japanese); Margaret McDonald (English)
The president of the tennis club who has an androgynous appearance but prefers others to not mistake his gender. He is called "The Prince" by his female classmates. On their first meeting, Saika asks help from Hachiman to join the tennis club, which was brushed off by Yukino. Saika then asked the Service Club to help him improve his tennis skills. He eventually became one of the few people in class 2F who would talk to Hachiman on a first name basis, and often hangs out with him. Despite knowing that Saika is a boy, Hachiman oftentimes finds himself unwillingly attracted to him.
Hayato Hayama (葉山 隼人, Hayama Hayato)
Voiced by: Takashi Kondō (Japanese); Scott Gibbs (English)
Yukino's childhood friend, a central figure in class 2F, and the ace of the football club. He is extremely kind to other people, including Hachiman, and often offers his help to others. However, Hayama claims that he can never forge a good relationship with Hachiman since, despite understanding his acts of social suicide to protect everyone, he does not agree with him. He and Yukino have some strain to their relationship, stemming from an incident in the past, and thus far, his attempts to mend his relationship with Yukino have failed. Despite his popularity and success, he feels largely inferior to Hachiman.
Yumiko Miura (三浦 優美子, Miura Yumiko)
Voiced by: Marina Inoue (Japanese); Christina Kelly (English)
Yumiko is a popular girl from class 2F with a pompous personality. She is the main female figure in Hayato's clique and it is hinted that she has feelings for Hayato. Due to her popularity, she has no trouble making friends, but she has little to misunderstanding towards people who have social troubles.
Hina Ebina (海老名 姫菜, Ebina Hina)
Voiced by: Nozomi Sasaki (Japanese); Natalie Rial (English).
A close friend of Yumiko and Yui's, and a member of Hayato's clique. A massive Yaoi fangirl who loves to see two boys hitting on each other. When she gets riled up, all respect for personal space of others goes out the window. She has an eye for detail, especially for clothing.
Saki Kawasaki (川崎 沙希, Kawasaki Saki)
Voiced by: Ami Koshimizu (Japanese); Teresa Zimmermann (English)
Hachiman's classmate who seems like a delinquent but wants to make friends deep down. She cares deeply for her brother as she hid her name and age to work as a night-shift bartender in order to pay school fees and reduce her family's load. After her brother asked for the Service Club's help, they eventually followed Saki to her workplace and found out her motives behind working night-shifts; she stopped working after the Service Club suggested her to aim for a scholarship instead.
Kakeru Tobe (戸部 翔, Tobe Kakeru)
Voiced by: Chado Horii (Japanese); Gareth West (English)
A member of Hayato's clique who is in the football club. He has feelings for Hina and is the only guy in the class who supported Hina's script for the cultural festival. During the school excursion, he intended to confess to Hina and therefore requested help from the Service Club. However, Hachiman knew Hina did not want to get into a relationship, so he confesses to (and is rejected by) Hina to prevent Tobe from being rejected, thus maintaining the status quo within that group.
Yamato (大和, Yamato)
Voiced by: Yoshihisa Kawahara (Japanese); Orlanders Jones (English)
A member of Hayato's clique who is in the rugby club.
Ōoka (大岡, Ōoka)
Voiced by: Minoru Shiraishi (Japanese); Daniel Regojo (English)
A member of Hayato's clique who is in the baseball club.
Minami Sagami (相模 南, Sagami Minami)
Voiced by: Minako Kotobuki (Japanese); Caitlynn French (English)
Minami leads the second-most popular clique in class 2F and resents Yui for joining a more influential group. During the cultural festival, she volunteers as event organizer despite lacking the necessary skills, forcing the Service Club to assist. Yukino effectively takes charge, overshadowing Minami and leaving her feeling inadequate. When Minami refuses to host the closing ceremony, Hachiman deliberately draws criticism onto himself, allowing her to regain confidence and successfully conclude the event.

=== Others ===
Iroha Isshiki (一色 いろは, Isshiki Iroha)
Voiced by: Ayane Sakura (Japanese); Luci Christian (English)
A first-year student who manages the football team, and is cheerful and pretty. As she was recommended as a candidate for the student council president in a prank, out of her dislike of the role, she filed a request to the Service Club in order to not get elected and yet not lose in an embarrassing fashion. She eventually accepts her role of being the student council president after Hachiman managed to convince her. She had feelings for Hayato but was rejected by him when they were visiting Destiny Land. There is a running joke where Iroha mistakes something that Hachiman says or does as flirting, and promptly rejects him.
Shizuka Hiratsuka (平塚 静, Hiratsuka Shizuka)
Voiced by: Ryoka Yuzuki (Japanese); Heidi Hinkel (English)
Hachiman's language teacher and the faculty advisor for the Service Club. Recognizing his social isolation, she deliberately assigns him to the club hoping it will help him. Despite her professional role, she displays eccentric traits—smoking, sensitivity about her age and unmarried status, and frequent references to shōnen manga. Her habit of entering the clubroom without knocking consistently annoys Yukino. Following the cultural festival, she admonishes Hachiman for his self-sacrificing tendencies, reminding him that his actions hurt those who care about him.
Komachi Hikigaya (比企谷 小町, Hikigaya Komachi)
Voiced by: Aoi Yūki (Japanese); Hilary Haag (English)
Hachiman's younger sister who, different from her brother, is cheerful and lively, and is a member of the student council in her school. She understands her brother's anti-social personality, cares for, and relies on him. While attached to her brother, she shows cleverness in trying to pair up Hachiman with Yukino or Yui.
Haruno Yukinoshita (雪ノ下 陽乃, Yukinoshita Haruno)
Voiced by: Mai Nakahara (Japanese); Olivia Swasey (English)
Yukino's older sister. She is a charismatic yet manipulative college student who frequently interferes in her sister's affairs. Outwardly charming, she masks a calculating nature, deliberately provoking Yukino and Hachiman while feigning amusement. As a former Sōbu High student, she recognizes Hachiman's perceptiveness and taunts him with backhanded praise. Her beauty and status lead others to overlook her harmful behavior, such as disrupting the Cultural Festival by encouraging irresponsibility—forcing Hachiman to compensate and become a scapegoat. When Yui realizes Haruno's intent to sabotage Yukino, she confronts her, demanding she cease meddling in their lives.
Yoshiteru Zaimokuza (材木座 義輝, Zaimokuza Yoshiteru)
Voiced by: Nobuyuki Hiyama (Japanese); Andrew Love (English)
A student from class 2C who suffers from adolescent delusions. He sees Hachiman as a friend after being paired up with him during physical education lessons. While he is annoying, he has a group of otaku friends he's on good terms with. He aims to be a light novel writer.
Rumi Tsurumi (鶴見 留美, Tsurumi Rumi)
Voiced by: Sumire Morohoshi (Japanese); Savanna Menzel (English)
A lonely primary school student who is openly despised by her peers. Hayato at first tried to resolve the situation through talking to her in front of her classmates, which instead attracted more hateful attention to her. Hachiman and company decided that the only way out is to destroy the trust between her peers, through having Hayato and Kakeru acting as bullies threatening Rumi's group-mates during treasure hunt. However, Rumi was able to use her camera's flash as a distraction, allowing the group to escape.
Meguri Shiromeguri (城廻 めぐり, Shiromeguri Meguri)
Voiced by: Azumi Asakura (Japanese); Jad Saxton (English)
A third-year student and the former president of Sōbu High School's student council. Although she is not a reliable leader herself, her personality has brought her immense support from the councillors and thus she is able to unite the student council.
Taishi Kawasaki (川崎 大志, Kawasaki Taishi)
Voiced by: Ayumu Murase (Japanese); Morgan Berry (English)
Saki's little brother and Komachi's classmate. He is on good terms with Komachi and is worried about Saki coming home late every night.
Kaori Orimoto (折本 かおり, Orimoto Kaori)
Voiced by: Haruka Tomatsu (Japanese); Kira Vincent-Davis (English)
Hachiman's classmate in middle school, whom he confessed to in the past. She attends Kaihin General High School.
Chika Nakamachi (仲町 千佳, Nakamachi Chika)
Voiced by: Saki Fujita (Japanese); Christie Guidry (English)
Kaori's friend and schoolmate at Kaihin General. She is interested in Hayato.
Tamanawa (玉縄)
Voiced by: Satoshi Hino (Japanese); Mike Haimoto (English)
A student council president of Kaihin High School.
Mrs. Yukinoshita
Voiced by: Kikuko Inoue (Japanese); Shelley Calene-Black (English)
Haruno and Yukino's mother. She worries for Yukino's whereabouts living alone and has Haruno spy on her. She is disappointed when she runs into Yukino late at night after a student council event.
Mrs. Yuigahama
Voiced by: Sayaka Ohara (Japanese); Monica Rial (English)
Yui's mother. She has a close mother-daughter relationship with Yui, one which Yukino is envious of.

== Media ==
=== Light novels ===
The light novel series is written by Wataru Watari and illustrated by Ponkan 8. It was published by Shogakukan under their Gagaga Bunko imprint. The first volume was published on March 18, 2011, and the series ended with its 14th volume released on November 19, 2019.

The limited editions of the fourth and eighth volumes included art books by Ponkan 8 and guest illustrators. A collection of short stories, numbered volume 7.5, was published on August 20, 2013. Three additional short volumes, 6.25, 6.50, and 6.75 were bundled with the limited editions of the first, third and fifth DVD and BD volumes, respectively, of the first anime series, and were released as single volume, numbered 6.5, on July 22, 2014. Another short story collection volume, labeled 10.5, was released on March 18, 2015, and a fourth one, 14.5, on April 20, 2021.

Yen Press licensed the series for English release and published it from September 27, 2016, to October 18, 2022.

No.	Original release date	Original ISBN	English release date	English ISBN
1	March 18, 2011	978-4-09-451262-5	September 27, 2016	978-0-316-31229-5
1. "Anyway, Hachiman Hikigaya is rotten." (とにかく比企谷八幡はくさっている., Tonikaku Hikigaya Hachiman wa kusatteiru); 2. "Yukino Yukinoshita always stands firm." (いつでも雪ノ下雪乃はつらぬいている., Itsumo Yukinoshita Yukino wa tsuranuiteiru); 3. "Yui Yuigahama is perpetually glancing around furtively." (つねに由比ヶ浜結衣はきょろきょろしている., Tsuneni Yuigahama Yui wa kyorokyoroshiteiru); 4. "Even so, the class is doing well." (それでもクラスはうまくやっている., Soredemo kurasu wa umaku yatteiru); 5. "In other words, Yoshiteru Zaimokuza is rather off." (つまり材木座義輝はズレている., Tsumari Zaimokuza Yoshiteru wa zureteiru); 6. "But Saika Totsuka has one." (けれど戸塚彩加はついている., Keredo Totsuka Saika wa tsuiteiru); 7. "Sometimes, the gods of romantic comedy are kind." (たまにラブコメの神様はいいことをする., Tamani rabukome no kamisama wa ii koto o suru); 8. "And then Hikigaya ponders." (そして比企谷八幡はかんがえる., Soshite Hikigaya Hachiman wa kangaeru)
2	July 20, 2011	978-4-09-451286-1	May 23, 2017	978-0-316-39601-1
1. "Prologue" (プロローグ, Purorōgu); 2. "And that's how Yui Yuigahama decided to study." (こうして由比ヶ浜結衣は勉強することにした., Kōshite Yuigahama Yui wa benkyōsuru koto ni shita); 3. "Komachi Hikigaya is gonna marry her big brother when she grows up. (says me)" (きっと、比企谷小町は大きくなったらお兄ちゃんと結婚する.と俺は思っている., Kitto, Hikigaya Komachi wa ōkiku nattara onii-chan to kekkonsuru. To ore wa omotteiru); 4. "Hayato Hayama's presence always shines." (いつでも葉山隼人は整えている., Itsudemo Hayama Hayato wa totonoeteiru); 5. "Saki Kawasaki has some stuff going on, so she's sulking." (いろいろあって川崎沙希は拗ねている., Iroiro atte Kawasaki Saki wa suneteiru); 6. "Hachiman Hikigaya goes back the way he came again." (またしても、比企谷八幡は元来た道へ引き返す., Matashitemo, Hikigaya Hachiman wa moto kita michi e hikikaesu)
3	November 18, 2011	978-4-09-451304-2 (RE); 978-4-09-451307-3 (LE)	September 19, 2017	978-0-316-31806-8
1. "This is how Shizuka Hiratsuka kicks off a new competition." (こうして平塚静は新たな戦端の口火を切る., Kōshite Hiratsuka Shizuka wa aratana sentan ni kuchibi o kiru); 2. "Saika Totsuka's youth romantic comedy is right, as I expected." (やはり戸塚彩加との青春ラブコメはまちがっていない., Yahari Totsuka Saika to no seishun rabukome wa machigatteinai); 3. "Yukino Yukinoshita really does love cats." (雪ノ下雪乃はやっぱり猫が好き., Yukinoshita Yukino wa yappari neko ga suki); 4. "Komachi Hikigaya is shrewdly scheming." (ちゃっかり比企谷小町は画策している., Chakkari Hikigaya Komachi wa kakusakushiteiru); 5. "Despite it all, Yoshiteru Zaimokuza wails alone in the wasteland." (それでも材木座義輝は荒野に一人、慟哭す., Soredemo Zaimokuza Yoshiteru wa kōya ni hitori, dōkokusu); 6. "Finally, his and her beginning ends." (ようやく彼と彼女の始まりが終わる., Yōyaku kare to kanojo no hajimari ga owaru); Bonus Track! "Like, This Sort of Birthday Song." (ぼーなすとらっく! 「たとえばこんなバースデーソング」, Bōnasu torakku! "Tatoeba konna bāsudēsongu")
4	March 16, 2012	978-4-09-451332-5 (RE); 978-4-09-451333-2 (LE)	September 19, 2017	978-0-316-31807-5
1. "This is how Hachiman Hikigaya spends his summer vacation." (こうして比企谷八幡の夏休みが過ぎてゆく., Kōshite Hikigaya Hachiman no natsuyasumi ga sugiteyuku); 2. "No matter what you do, you can't escape Shizuka Hiratsuka." (どうしても平塚静からは逃げられない., Dōshitemo Hiratsuka Shizuka kara wa nigerarenai); 3. "Hayato Hayama is socially adept with everyone." (誰に対しても葉山隼人はそつがない., Dare ni taishitemo Hayama Hayato wa sotsu ga nai); 4. "Out of nowhere, Hina Ebina begins proselytizing." (唐突に、海老名姫菜は布教を開始する., Tōtotsuni, Ebina Hina wa fukyō o kaishisuru); 5. "All alone, Yukino Yukinoshita gazes up at the night sky." (ひとり、雪ノ下雪乃は夜空を見上げる., Hitori, Yukinoshita Yukino wa yozora o miageru); 6. "Unfortunately, Hachiman Hikigaya did not bring a swimsuit." (不覚にも、比企谷八幡は水着を持ってきていない., Fukakunimo, Hikigaya Hachiman wa mizugi o mottekiteinai); 7. "In the end, Rumi Tsurumi chooses her own path." (最後に鶴見留美は自分の道を選び取る., Saigoni Tsurumi Rumi wa jibun no michi o erabitoru); 8. "With Yukino Yukinoshita aboard, the car drives away." (そして、雪ノ下雪乃を乗せた車は走り出す., Soshite, Yukinoshita Yukino o noseta kuruma wa hashiridasu)
5	July 18, 2012	978-4-09-451356-1	May 22, 2018	978-0-316-31808-2
1. "All of a sudden, the tranquility of the Hikigaya household collapses." (突然、比企谷家の平穏は崩れ去る., Totsuzen, Hikigaya-ke no heion wa kuzuresaru); 2. "Sure enough, he's forgotten Saki Kawisaki." (案の定、川崎沙希は憶えられていない., Annojō, Kawasaki Saki wa oboerareteinai); 3. "Saika Totsuka has surprisingly subdued tastes." (意外と戸塚彩加のセレクトは渋い., Igaito, Totsuka Saika no serekuto wa shibui); 4. "Unfortunately, nobody knows where Shizuka Hiratsuka's red thread went." (遺憾にも、平塚静の赤い糸の行方は誰も知らない., Ikannimo, Hiratsuka Shizuka no akai ito no yukue wa dare mo shiranai); 5. "Komachi Hikigaya considers that one day, her brother may leave." (ふと比企谷小町は兄離れする日を思う., Futo, Hikigaya Komachi wa anibanaresuru hi o omou); 6. "And so Yui Yuigahama disappears into the throng." (そして由比ヶ浜結衣は雑踏の中に消えていく., Soshite, Yuigahama Yui wa zattō no naka ni kieteiku); 7. "And as for Hachiman Hikigaya..." (では、比企谷八幡は., Dewa, Hikigaya Hachiman wa); 8. "Yukino Yukinoshita stands in place, just for a moment." (すこしだけ、雪ノ下雪乃は立ち止まる., Sukoshidake, Yukinoshita Yukino wa tachidomaru)
6	November 20, 2012	978-4-09-451380-6	November 13, 2018	978-0-316-41186-8
1. "Hina Ebina's musical is homoerotic, as expected." (やはり海老名姫菜のミュージカルは腐っている., Yahari Ebina Hina no myūjikaru wa kusatteiru); 2. "In the storm, Hachiman Hikigaya continues to slide." (嵐の中、比企谷八幡は滑り続ける., Arashi no naka, Hikigaya Hachiman wa suberitsuzukeru); 3. "Minami Sagami aggressively makes a request." (強烈に相模南はアピールする., Kyōretsuni, Sagami Minami wa apīrusuru); 4. "Hina Ebina's musical is homoerotic, as expected. (Part 2)" (やはり海老名姫菜のミュージカルは腐っている.2, Yahari Ebina Hina no myūjikaru wa kusatteiru. 2); 5. "Suddenly, Haruno Yukinoshita attacks." (いきなり雪ノ下陽乃は強襲する., Ikinari Yukinoshita Haruno wa kyōshūsuru); 6. "Meguri Shiromeguri is pleasantly trifled with." (ほんわかと城廻めぐりは翻弄される., Honwakato, Shiromeguri Meguri wa honrōsareru); 7. "Unusually, Yui Yuigahama is indignant." (いつになく、由比ヶ浜結衣は憤る., Itsuninaku, Yuigahama Yui wa ikidōru); 8. "This is the moment Soubu High School is festivaling hardest." (今まさに総武高校は最高にフェスティバっている., Imamasani, Sōbu Kōkō wa saikōni fesutibatteiru); 9. "Beyond, Yukino Yukinoshita has her eye on someone." (その先に、雪ノ下雪乃は見つめる人がいる., Sono saki ni, Yukinoshita Yukino wa mitsumeru hito ga iru); 10. "And so the curtain rises on each stage." (そしてそれぞれの舞台が幕を開ける., Soshite sorezore no butai ga maku o akeru); 11. "Finally he and she find the right answers." (ようやく彼と彼女は正しい答えを見つけ出す., Yōyaku kare to kanojo wa tadashii kotae o mitsukedasu)
6.5	July 22, 2014	978-4-09-451501-5 (RE); 978-4-09-451502-2 (LE)	June 23, 2020	978-1-9753-8416-6
1. "Yet again, Shizuka Hiratsuka gives new orders." 2. "We meet Meguri Shiromeguri once more." 3. "Just as he figured, Minami Sagami hasn't changed." 4. "Haruno Yukinoshita continues to test them until the last." 5. "Based on the aforementioned, Hachiman Hikigaya has a hunch." 6. "But even so, Meguri Shiromeguri is watching," 7. "And now the final meeting breaks into action." 8. "That's why their festival won't end."; Bonus: ""When the Flame of That Christmas Candle Wavers...""
7	March 19, 2013	978-4-09-451402-5 (RE); 978-4-09-451403-2 (LE)	February 19, 2019	978-1-9753-8412-8
1. "Hachiman Hikigaya's life at school is, in fact, extremely peaceful." (これでも比企谷八幡の学校生活は平穏に過ぎている., Koredemo Hikigaya Hachiman no gakkō seikatsu wa heionni sugiteiru); 2. "Nobody knows why they came to the Service Club." (何故、彼らが奉仕部に来たのか誰も知らない., Naze, karera ga hōshibu ni kita no ka dare mo shiranai); 3. "Kakeru Tobe is just hopelessly shallow." (どうにもこうにも戸部翔は薄っぺらい., Dōnimo kōnimo Tobe Kakeru wa usupperai); 4. "At the end of the day, Hina Ebina is rotten?" (とどのつまり海老名姫菜は腐っている?, Todo no tsumari, Ebina Hina wa kusatteiru?); 5. "As you can see, Yui Yuigahama is doing her best." (ご覧の通り、由比ヶ浜結衣は頑張っている., Goran no tōri, Yuigahama Yui wa ganbatteiru); 6. "Surreptitiously, Yukino Yukinoshita goes out to town at night." (ひっそりと雪ノ下雪乃は夜の街を行く., Hissorito, Yukinoshita Yukino wa yoru no machi o iku); 7. "Unexpectedly, Yumiko Miura is actually paying attention." (思いのほか、三浦優美子はちゃんと見ている., Omoi no hoka, Miura Yumiko wa chanto miteiru); 8. "Even so, Hayato Hayama can't make a choice." (それでも、葉山隼人は選べない., Soredemo, Hayama Hayato wa erabenai); 9. "His and her confessions will reach no one." (——彼と彼女の告白は誰にも届かない., ——Kare to kanojo no kokuhaku wa dare ni mo todokanai); Bonus Track! "The girls will rock you. ♥" (B T!: ぼーなすとらっく!彼女たちの、うぃー・うぃる・ろっく・ゆー♡, BT!: Bōnasu torakku! Kanojo-tachi no, wī wiru rokku yū ♡)
7.5	August 20, 2013	978-4-09-451434-6	June 18, 2019	978-1-9753-8415-9
Short Story 1: "Hachiman Hikigaya's idea of "Mom's cooking" is wrong, as I expected."; Special Act: Side A: "We must wish them all the best in their futures."; Short Story 2: "Of course Hachiman Hikigaya's kindness is contrary."; Bonus track!: "Komachi Hikigaya's Plot."; Short Story 3: "Unexpectedly, Hichiman Hikigaya's studying methods are not wrong."; Special Act: Side B: "They have yet to know of a place they should go back to."; Short Story 4: "Regardless, Hachiman Hikigaya's positive thinking is completely twisted."
8	November 19, 2013	978-4-09-451451-3 (RE); 978-4-09-451453-7 (LE)	November 5, 2019	978-1-9753-8413-5
1. "Needless to say, Komachi Hikigaya's wrath is there." 2. "For some reason, Iroha Isshiki smells of danger." 3. "Haruno Yukinoshita is thoroughly unfathomable." 4. "Quietly, Yukino Yukinoshita resolves herself." 5. "Right to the end, Hayato Hayama just can't understand it." 6. "And so Yui Yuigahama declares." 7. "Needless to say, Komachi Hikigaya's kindness is there." 8. "When the time is ripe, Hachiman Hikigaya makes his speech." 9. "The room no longer smells of tea."
9	April 18, 2014	978-4-09-451482-7	February 25, 2020	978-1-9753-8414-2
1. "But that room continues to play out their routine endlessly." 2. "Once again, Iroha Isshiki knocks on the door." 3. "The meeting smoothly jumps into motion but gets nowhere." 4. "Once more, Hachiman Hikigavya asks himself." 5. "That's why Saika Totsuka feels admiration." 6. "Shizuka Hiratsuka wishes them a good future." 7. "But even so, Hachiman Hikigaya..."; 8. "Someday, Yui Yuigahama will..." 9. "And then Yukino Yukinoshita..."; 10. "Of her own accord, Iroha Isshiki takes a step." 11. "The lights in each of their palms illuminate..."
10	November 18, 2014	978-4-09-451523-7	December 1, 2020	978-1-9753-8411-1
The First Notebook: ...Possibly, that's not unique to anyone.; 1. "In the end, Komachi Hikigaya looks for divine help." 2. "As usual, Haruno Yukinoshita stirs things up." 3. "At some point, Iroha Isshiki started hanging around." 4. "Yumiko Miura still wants to know anyway." 5. "Saika Totsuka is waiting until that someday comes." 6. "Gallantly, Haruno Yukinoshita departs into the darkness."; The Second Notebook: ...Or it could be unique to everyone.; 7. "Hayato Hayama always meets expectations." 8. "That's how their pasts and futures cross, leading to the present."; The Third Notebook: ...So then who was it unique to?; 9. "However, Haruno Yukinoshita spake thus."
10.5	March 18, 2015	978-4-09-451542-8	January 19, 2021	978-1-9753-8417-3
1. "One of these days, we'll probably find a simple job even Yoshiteru Zaimokuza can handle." 2. "Surely, Iroha Isshiki is made of sugar and spice and everything nice." 3. "There lies the deadline they absolutely cannot fail to make." 4. "And thus the night grows late at the Hikigaya household."
11	June 24, 2015	978-4-09-451558-9	May 25, 2021	978-1-9753-2498-8
1. "Once he's aware that winter has begun, it has already passed." 2. "And so begin the all-girls battle (with boys, too)." 3. "Unexpectedly, what Iroha Isshiki's absence brings is..." 4. "And so brings the boys' emotional roller coaster (with girls, too)." 5. "Suddenly, Shizuka Hiratsuka lectures about the present continuous and the past." 6. "He fails to reach the "something real" he's after and continues to get it wrong." 7. "Haruno Yukinoshita's eyes are hopelessly clear." 8. "Interlude: Yui Yuigahama's gaze is always gentle and warm.." 9. "Interlude: Spring is made and begins to bud underneath the snow."
12	September 20, 2017	978-4-09-451674-6	October 5, 2021	978-1-9753-2499-5
Interlude; 1. "Eventually, the seasons change, and the snow melts away." 2. "Despite appearances, Haruno Yukinoshita is not drunk."; Interlude; 3. "Komachi Hikigaya takes him by surprise and gets formal." 4. "Until today, Iroha Isshiki is the most powerful of underclassmen." 5. "Yui Yuigahama's thoughts happen to turn to the future." 6. "Even knowing that he will regret the decision..."; Interlude
13	November 20, 2018	978-4-09-451762-0	March 15, 2022	978-1-9753-2500-8
Interlude; 1. "Shizuka Hiratsuka feels keenly nostalgic about the past." 2. "There's something Iroha Isshiki wants to make sure of, no matter what."; Interlude; 3. "Yui Yuigahama continues to stand back and watch, to the end."; Interlude; 4. "Once again, Hachiman Hikigaya makes a speech." 5. "At some point unknown, the ending credits begin to roll."; Interlude; 6. "Privately, Hayato Hayama feels regret."; Interlude; 7. "What Hina Ebina sees through the lens is..."; Interlude; 8. "While wishing to not go wrong again, at least..."; Interlude
14	November 19, 2019	978-4-09-451781-1	July 12, 2022	978-1-9753-2501-5
Prelude 1; 1. "Nevertheless, Hachiman Hikigaya's life goes on."; Prelude 2; 2. "Eventually, he'll become used to this relationship, too."; Prelude 3; 3. "Surely, he will remember that season every time he smells that scent."; Prelude 4; 4. "And then Yukino Yukinoshita quietly waves."; Interlude; 5. "Gallantly, Shizuka Hiratsuka walks ahead." 6. "Just like that time before, Yui Yuigahama implores."; Interlude; Interlude; 7. "The heat touching him is the only feeling that does clearly get across." 8. "That door is opened once more."; Interlude; 9. "Even if it's faded by the passing months, that green remains green." 10. "That's why Hachiman Hikigaya said..."
14.5	April 20, 2021	978-4-09-453004-9	October 18, 2022	978-1-9753-4793-2
1. "Always and forevermore, Komachi Hikigaya wants a sister-in-law." 2. "Nevertheless, Komachi Hikigaya won't give up on getting a sister-in-law." 3. "And then the festival ends, and a new festival begins." 4. "Nonchalantly, casually, Iroha Isshiki assembles a future." 5. "But surely, the girls will also continue to go wrong."

=== Drama CDs ===
A drama CD, titled Tatoeba Konna Birthday Song (たとえばこんなバースデーソング; subtitled with "Birthday Song for you"), was released with a special edition of the 3rd light novel on November 18, 2011. The drama CD contains a character song, sung by Yukino Yokinoshita (Saori Hayami) and Yui Yuigahama (Nao Tōyama), titled "Bright Generation" and composed by Yukari Hashimoto. A second drama CD, titled Hikigaya Komachi no Keiryaku (比企谷小町の計略; subtitled with "His sister's tactics"), was sold together with the first one at Marvelous AQL's booth at Comiket 83, held on December 29–31, 2012. A third drama CD, titled Kanojotachi no, We Will Rock You (彼女たちの、うぃー・うぃる・ろっく・ゆー♡; subtitled with "We will... We will rock "you"!!"), was bundled with the special edition of the 7th volume, published on March 19, 2013. The drama CD contains a character song by Yokinoshita (Hayami) and Yuigahama (Tōyama), titled "Rock You!!" and composed and arranged by Yūya Saitō. A fourth drama CD, titled Sono Christmas Candle no Akari ga Yureru Toki... (そのクリスマスキャンドルの灯が揺れる時.......), was released with the special edition of volume 6.5 on July 22, 2014. The fourth drama CD contains a character song by Hayami and Tōyama, titled "Kimi to Merry Christmas" (君とMerry Christmas).

=== Manga ===
The first manga adaptation, illustrated by Rechi Kazuki, was released under the title My Youth Romantic Comedy Is Wrong, as I Expected -Monologue- (やはり俺の青春ラブコメはまちがっている。-妄言録-, Yahari Ore no Seishun Rabu Kome wa Machigatteiru -Monologue-). It was serialized in Square Enix's Monthly Big Gangan from September 25, 2012, to April 25, 2023. Its chapters have been collected into twenty-two tankōbon volumes published between March 19, 2013, and July 25, 2023.

A second series, illustrated by Naomichi Io and titled My Youth Romantic Comedy Is Wrong, as I Expected @comic (やはり俺の青春ラブコメはまちがっている。@comic, Yahari Ore no Seishun Rabu Kome wa Machigatteiru @comic) was serialized in Shogakukan's Monthly Sunday Gene-X magazine from December 19, 2012, to February 17, 2023. Its chapters have been collected into twenty-two tankōbon volumes published between May 17, 2013, and April 18, 2023. Yen Press licensed the series for English release.

A 4-panel manga series by Yūta Taneda, titled Yahari 4-koma demo Ore no Seishun Rabu Kome wa Machigatteiru (やはり4コマでも俺の青春ラブコメはまちがっている.), was published by Ichijinsha's Manga 4-koma Palette magazine. A preview chapter was published on March 22, 2013, and the first chapter was published on April 22 of that same year. It ended on June 22, 2015, and its chapters were collected in two volumes. Two anthology volumes by several authors were published by Ichijinsha under its DNA Media Comics imprint on May 25 and July 25, 2013.

==== -Monologue- volumes ====
No.	Release date	ISBN
1	March 19, 2013	978-4-7575-3925-9
2	August 20, 2013	978-4-7575-4031-6
3	December 25, 2013	978-4-7575-4193-1
4	May 24, 2014	978-4-7575-4318-8
5	November 18, 2014	978-4-7575-4466-6
6	March 18, 2015	978-4-7575-4581-6
7	June 18, 2015	978-4-7575-4663-9
8	December 25, 2015	978-4-7575-4845-9
9	July 25, 2016	978-4-7575-5062-9
10	January 25, 2017	978-4-7575-5226-5
11	August 25, 2017	978-4-7575-5456-6
12	March 24, 2018	978-4-7575-5675-1
13	March 25, 2019	978-4-7575-5897-7
14	June 25, 2019	978-4-7575-6174-8
15	November 25, 2019	978-4-7575-6359-9
16	March 25, 2020	978-4-7575-6578-4
17	July 22, 2020	978-4-7575-6714-6
18	January 25, 2021	978-4-7575-7052-8
19	July 26, 2021	978-4-7575-7380-2
20	March 25, 2022	978-4-7575-7841-8
21	November 25, 2022	978-4-7575-8272-9
22	July 25, 2023	978-4-7575-8693-2

==== @comic volumes ====
No.	Original release date	Original ISBN	English release date	English ISBN
1	May 17, 2013	978-4-09-157349-0	May 31, 2016	978-0-316-31230-1
1. "Anyway, Hachiman Hikigaya is rotten." 2. "Yukino Yukinoshita always stands firm." 3. "Yui Yuigahama is perpetually glancing around furtively." 4. "Even so, the class is doing well." 5. "In other words, Yoshiteru Zaimokuza is rather off."
2	November 19, 2013	978-4-09-157362-9	September 27, 2016	978-0-316-31810-5
6. "But Saika Totsuka has a "package"." 7. "Sometimes the gods of romantic comedy do good. [Part One]"; 8. "Sometimes the gods of romantic comedy do good. [Part Two]"; 9. "And that's how Yui Yuigahama decided to study." 10. "Hayato Hayama always has it together." 11. "Saki Kawasaki has some stuff going on, so she's sulking. [Part One]"
3	May 19, 2014	978-4-09-157377-3	December 20, 2016	978-0-316-31811-2
12. "Saki Kawasaki has some stuff going on, so she's sulking. [Part Two]"; 13. "Hachiman Hikigaya goes back the way he came again." 14. "Saika Totsuka's youth romantic comedy is right, as expected." 15. "Yukino Yukinoshita really does love cats." 16. "Shrewd Komachi Hikigaya is scheming." 17. "Suddenly, Haruno Yukinoshita makes an appearance."
4	November 19, 2014	978-4-09-157396-4	March 21, 2017	978-0-316-31812-9
18. "Despite it all, Yoshiteru Zaimokuza wails alone in the wasteland. [Part One]"; 19. "Despite it all, Yoshiteru Zaimokuza wails alone in the wasteland. [Part Two]"; 20. "Finally, his and her beginning ends." 21. "They have yet to know of a place they should go back to. [Part One]"; 22. "They have yet to know of a place they should go back to. [Part Two]"; 23. "They have yet to know of a place they should go back to. [Part Three]"
5	May 19, 2015	978-4-09-157417-6	June 20, 2017	978-0-316-31813-6
24. "No matter what you do, you can't escape Shizuka Hiratsuka."; 25. "Hayato Hayama is socially adept with everyone." 26. "All alone, Yukino Yukinoshita gazes up at the night sky." 27. "Unfortunately, Hachiman Hikigaya did not bring a swimsuit." 28. "In the end, Rumi Tsurumi chooses her own path." 29. "The car that Yukino Yukinoshita rode in sets off."
6	November 21, 2015	978-4-09-157430-5	September 19, 2017	978-0-316-41187-5
30. "Sure enough, he's forgotten Saki Kawasaki."; 31. "Saika Totsuka has surprisingly subdued tastes." 32. "Unfortunately, nobody knows where Shizuka Hiratsuka's red thread went." 33. "Komachi Hikigaya considers that, one day, her brother may leave." 34. "And so Yui Yuigahama disappears into the throng." 35. "And as for Hachiman Hikigaya..."
7	June 17, 2016	978-4-09-157450-3	December 19, 2017	978-0-316-51721-8
36. "Minami Sagami aggressively makes a request." 37. "Hina Ebina's musical is homoerotic, as expected." 38. "Suddenly, Haruno Yukinoshita attacks." 39. "Unusually, Yui Yuigahama is indignant." 40. "This is the moment Soubu High School is festivaling hardest." 41. "Beyond, there's someone Yukino Yukinoshita is watching."
8	November 18, 2016	978-4-09-157464-0	April 24, 2018	978-0-316-51722-5
42. "And so the curtain rises on each stage." 43. "Finally, he and she find the right answers." 44. "Just as he figured, Minami Sagami hasn't changed." 45. "Haruno Yukinoshita continues to test them until the last." 46. "Based on the aforementioned, Hachiman Hikigaya has a hunch." 47. "But even so, Meguri Shiromeguri is watching."
9	May 19, 2017	978-4-09-157486-2	December 11, 2018	978-1-9753-8101-1
48. "And now the final meeting breaks into action." 49. "That's why their festival won't end." 50. "Kakeru Tobe is just hopelessly shallow." 51. "Surreptitiously, Yukino Yukinoshita goes out to town at night." 52. "Unexpectedly, Yumiko Miura is actually paying attention." 53. "Their confessions will reach no one."
10	November 17, 2017	978-4-09-157506-7	March 19, 2019	978-1-9753-8410-4
54. "For some reason, Iroha Isshiki smells of danger." 55. "Right to the end, Hayato Hayama just can't understand it." 56. "And so Yui Yuigahama declares." 57. "When the time is ripe, Hachiman Hikigaya makes his speech." 58. "The room no longer smells of tea."
11	May 18, 2018	978-4-09-157525-8	June 18, 2019	978-1-9753-0446-1
59. "But that room continues to play out their routine endlessly." 60. "The meeting smoothly jumps into motion but gets nowhere." 61. "Once more, Hachiman Hikigaya asks himself." 62. "Shizuka Hiratsuka wishes them a good future." 63. "But even so, Hachiman Hikigaya... [Part One]"; 64. "But even so, Hachiman Hikigaya... [Part Two]"
12	November 19, 2018	978-4-09-157550-0	December 17, 2019	978-1-9753-5937-9
65. "From that day forward, he and the girls..." 66. Someday, Yui Yuigahama will..." 67. "And then Yukino Yukinoshita..."; 68. "On her own accord, Iroha Isshiki takes a step." 69. "And so this nonfunctioning meeting ends up..."; Bonus: "The Gift of the Magi"; 70. "What the lights in each of their palms illuminates."
13	April 19, 2019	978-4-09-157563-0	March 24, 2020	978-1-9753-9950-4
71. "Surely, Iroha Isshiki is made of sugar and spice and everything nice." 72. "There lies the deadline they absolutely cannot fail to make." 73. "In the end, Komachi Hikigaya looks for divine help." 74. "As usual, Haruno Yukinoshita stirs things up." 75. "At some point, Iroha Isshiki started hanging around."
14	November 19, 2019	978-4-09-157581-4	September 22, 2020	978-1-9753-1612-9
76. "Even then, Yumiko Miura still wants to know. [Part One]"; 77. "Even then, Yumiko Miura still wants to know. [Part Two]"; 78. "Saika Totsuka is waiting until that someday comes." 79. "Gallantly, Haruno Yukinoshita departs into the darkness." 80. "Hayato Hayama always meets expectations." 81. "That's how their pasts and futures cross, leading to the present."; Chapter 81.5: "However, Haruno Yukinoshita spake."
15	March 19, 2020	978-4-09-157592-0	June 29, 2021	978-1-9753-2497-1
82. "By the time he's aware that winter has begun, it has already passed." 83. "And so begins the emotional roller coaster for the boys (and some girls too)." 84. "He fails to reach the "something real" he's after and continues to get it wrong." 85. "Yukino Yukinoshita's eyes are hopelessly clear." 86. "No matter what, Yui Yuigahama's gaze is warm and gentle."
16	September 18, 2020	978-4-09-157606-4	October 26, 2021	978-1-9753-3810-7
87. "Eventually, the seasons change, and the snow melts away."; Chapter 87.5: "Interlude Haruno."; 88. "Komachi Hikigaya takes him by surprise and gets formal." 89. "Until today, he has never once touched that key." 90. "Unsurprisingly, Iroha Isshiki is the most powerful of kouhais. [Part One]"; 91. "Unsurprisingly, Iroha Isshiki is the most powerful of kouhais. [Part Two]"
17	February 19, 2021	978-4-09-157623-1	January 25, 2022	978-1-9753-3963-0
92. "Yui Yuigaham's thoughts happen to turn to the future." 93. "Even knowing that he will regret the decision... [Part One]"; 94. "Even knowing that he will regret the decision... [Part Two]"; Chapter 94.5: "Interlude Yui Yuigahama."; 95. "Even knowing that he will regret the decision... [Part Three]"; 96. "There's something Iroha Isshiki wants to make sure of, no matter what."; Chapter 96.5: "Interlude Iroha Isshiki."
18	July 19, 2021	978-4-09-157642-2	August 2, 2022	978-1-9753-4789-5
97. "Once again, Hachiman Hikigaya makes a speech. [Part One]"; 98. "Once again, Hachiman Hikigaya makes a speech. [Part Two]"; 99. "At some unknown points, the ending credits begin to roll." 100. "Privately, Hayato Hayama feels regret."; Chapter 100.5: "Interlude Hayato Hayama."; 101. "What Hina Ebina sees through the lens is..."; "Spot the Differences Answers."
19	December 17, 2021	978-4-09-157664-4	April 18, 2023	978-1-9753-6034-4
102. "While wishing to not go wrong again, at least... [Part One]"; Chapter 102.5: "Interlude Haruno Yukinoshita."; 103. "While wishing to not go wrong again, at least... [Part Two]"; Chapter 103.5: "Interlude Yukino Yukinoshita."; 104. "Nevertheless, Hachiman Hikigaya's life goes on." 105. "Surely, he will remember that season every time he smells that scent."
20	May 19, 2022	978-4-09-157679-8	February 20, 2024	978-1-9753-9111-9
106. "In any event, they have their warped festivity." 107. "And then Yukino Yukinoshita quietly waves. [Part One]"; 108. "And then Yukino Yukinoshita quietly waves. [Part Two]"; 109. "And then Yukino Yukinoshita quietly waves. [Part Three]"; Chapter 109.5: "Interlude Hachiman Hikigaya."
21	October 19, 2022	978-4-09-157691-0	May 21, 2024	978-1-9753-9112-6
110. "Just like that time before, Yui Yuigahama implores." 111. "The heat touching him is the only feeling that does clearly get across. [Part One]"; 112. "The heat touching him is the only feeling that does clearly get across. [Part Two]"; 113. "That door is opened once more. ①"; 114. "That door is opened once more. ②"
22	April 18, 2023	978-4-09-157750-4	August 20, 2024	978-1-9753-9113-3
115. "That door is opened once more. ③"; 116. "Even if it's faded by the passing months, that green remains green. ①"; 117. "Even if it's faded by the passing months, that green remains green. ②"; Final Chapter: "That's why Hachiman Hikigaya said as much."; Extra Chapter: "That irreplaceable moment, for the sake of a plain, ordinary future."

=== Anime ===
A 13-episode anime television series, directed by Ai Yoshimura and produced by Brain's Base, aired between April 5 and June 21, 2013, with an additional anime-original episode with writing by Wataru Watari following the series on June 27, 2013. The series was simulcast with English subtitles by Crunchyroll. An OVA episode on Blu-ray Disc was bundled with the limited edition of the video game, released on September 19, 2013. The opening theme is "Yukitoki" (ユキトキ) by Nagi Yanagi and the ending theme is "Hello Alone" by Saori Hayami (credited as Yukino Yokinoshita) and Nao Tōyama (credited as Yui Yuigahama). The anime has been licensed by Sentai Filmworks in North America and Madman Entertainment in Australia and New Zealand.

A second season was announced by Shogakukan in 2014. The season, titled Yahari Ore no Seishun Love Come wa Machigatteiru Zoku, was produced by Feel and directed by Kei Oikawa, with character designs by Yuichi Tanaka and series composition by Shōtarō Suga. It aired between April 3 and June 26, 2015. The opening theme is "Harumodoki" (春擬き) by Yanagi. The ending theme is "Everyday World." (エブリデイワールド) by Saori Hayami (credited as Yukino Yokinoshita) and Nao Tōyama (credited as Yui Yuigahama). The second season has been licensed by Sentai Filmworks. An OVA episode, titled Undoubtedly, Girls Are Made of Sugar, Spice, and Something Nice (きっと、女の子はお砂糖とスパイスと素敵な何かでできている, Kitto, Onna no Ko wa Osatō to Spice to Suteki na Nanika de Dekiteiru), was bundled with the limited edition of the second video game, which was released on October 27, 2016.

A third and final season was announced by Shogakukan on March 18, 2019. Feel returned to animate the third season, with Kei Oikawa returning as director, Keiichirō Ōchi replacing Shōtarō Suga as series composer, and Yuichi Tanaka returning as character designer. The season, titled Yahari Ore no Seishun Love Come wa Machigatteiru Kan, was set to premier on April 9, 2020, before the series was delayed due to the COVID-19 pandemic. The third season aired from July 9 to September 24, 2020. The opening theme is "Megumi no Ame" (芽ぐみの雨) by Yanagi, and the ending theme is "Diamond no Jundo" (ダイヤモンドの純度) by Saori Hayami (credited as Yukino Yokinoshita) and Nao Tōyama (credited as Yui Yuigahama). Sentai Filmworks licensed the third season globally excluding Asia. In Southeast Asia, the series is licensed by Medialink and released on streaming service iQIYI. The third season ran for 12 episodes. An OVA episode, adapting part of the bonus light novels included with the Blu-ray release of the third season, was bundled with the limited edition of the third video game, which was released on April 27, 2023.

In April 2019, Sentai Filmworks confirmed that the series would receive a dub; in July of the same year, Sentai announced that both the first and second seasons would be dubbed. After Sony Pictures Television acquired Crunchyroll, the parent company of Funimation in 2021, My Teen Romantic Comedy SNAFU, among several Sentai titles, was dropped from the service on March 31, 2022.

As part of the 10th anniversary celebration of the anime series, a new song "Yuki Haru Ame" (ユキハルアメ) by Yanagi was released on June 28, 2023.

=== Video games ===
A video game for PlayStation Vita, titled Yahari Game demo Ore no Seishun Rabu Kome wa Machigatteiru (やはりゲームでも俺の青春ラブコメはまちがっている.; lit. My Youth Romantic Comedy even in a Game is Wrong As I Expected) was published by 5pb. and released on September 19, 2013. Takuya Eguchi, Saori Hayami, and Nao Tōyama reprised their roles from the anime. The limited edition was bundled with an OVA episode. 5pb. developed a second video game for the series for the PlayStation Vita that adapted the second season of the anime television series. It was released on October 27, 2016. Like the first game, the limited edition was bundled with an OVA episode. The release date of the second game was postponed from July 28, 2016, to October 27 of that same year. Both games were later released in a bundle for the PlayStation 4 on October 26, 2017. A port for the Nintendo Switch was released on September 22, 2022. A third game by 5pb., adapting the third season of the anime television series, was released in Japan for PlayStation 4 and Nintendo Switch on April 27, 2023. The limited edition was also bundled with an OVA episode.

== Reception ==
By January 2020, the light novel had over 10 million copies in circulation. My Youth Romantic Comedy Is Wrong, as I Expected was chosen as the best light novel of Japan according to the online polls compiled by the Kono Light Novel ga Sugoi! annual guide book in 2014, 2015 and 2016.
