= Yandere Dark Elf: She Chased Me All the Way From Another World! =

Japanese manga series

- First tankōbon volume cover, featuring Mariabell

ちょっとだけ愛が重いダークエルフが異世界から追いかけてきた (Chotto Dake Ai ga Omoi Dāku Erufu ga Isekai Kara Oikakete Kita)
- Genre: Reverse isekai; Romantic comedy
- Manga
- Written by: Nakanosora
- Published by: Takeshobo
- English publisher: NA: Seven Seas Entertainment
- Imprint: Bamboo Comics
- Magazine: Web Comic Gamma Plus
- Original run: September 17, 2021 – September 26, 2025
- Volumes: 5
- Anime television series
- Directed by: Toshikatsu Tokoro
- Produced by: Ryuji Ishizaka
- Written by: Yuki Takabayashi
- Music by: Chihiro Endō
- Studio: Elias
- Licensed by: Sentai Filmworks
- Original network: Tokyo MX, BS11 (censored); AT-X (partially uncensored)
- Original run: April 7, 2025 – June 23, 2025
- Episodes: 12

Yandere Dark Elf: She Chased Me All the Way From Another World! (Japanese: ちょっとだけ愛が重いダークエルフが異世界から追いかけてきた, Hepburn: Chotto Dake Ai ga Omoi Dāku Erufu ga Isekai Kara Oikakete Kita) is a Japanese manga series written and illustrated by Nakanosora, based on the adult doujinshi of the same title. It was serialized online via Takeshobo's Web Comic Gamma Plus website from September 2021 to September 2025, with its chapters collected in five tankōbon volumes. An anime television series adaptation produced by Elias aired from April to June 2025.

== Plot ==
Hinata Sunohara is an orphan and student who lives alone. He was summoned to a fantasy world and, with his party, defeated the Demon Lord who was threatening the land. However, as soon as they did, he was sent back to Earth. He settles back into his life, but one day, his party member, the dark elf Mariabell, teleports into his apartment completely naked. After getting her clothes, she explains that she is in love with him and wants to be with him forever. He lets her stay in his apartment and helps her adjust to Earth, but must cope with the fact that she is completely obsessed with him, constantly tries to seduce him, and becomes murderously jealous of any girl he interacts with, like his classmate Sakura Mochida.

== Characters ==
Hinata Sunohara (春原日向, Sunohara Hinata)
Voiced by: Rie Kawamura (Japanese); James Marler (English)
A young Japanese high schooler and orphan who lives by himself in an apartment building. His parents died in a car accident, which he has long felt guilty about since he had diverted his father's attention while he was driving. Because of his selflessness and kindness, he was summoned to a fantasy world to act as a fighter in the adventuring party which was destined to vanquish a powerful Demon Lord. During his time there, he caught the heart of his fellow party member Mariabell, who obsessively follows him to Earth after he is returned following the Demon Lord's demise. Although he does care for Mariabell, her blatantly suggestive flirtations leave him extremely flustered.
Mariabell (マリアベル, Mariaberu)
Voiced by: Minami Takahashi (Japanese); Natalie Rial (English)
A dark elf sorceress from the other world. After meeting Hinata when he rescued her from some humans who wanted to rape her, and fighting alongside him, she has fallen hopelessly in love with him, and after his departure following right after the Demon Lord's defeat, she uses her magical powers to follow him back to Earth. While generally friendly and caring, she becomes menacing in her obsession for Hinata. She is usually referred to as "Bell" (ベル, Beru).
Sakura Mochida (持田咲良, Mochida Sakura)
Voiced by: Kyouka Maruyama (Japanese); Alyssa Marek (English)
A shy female classmate of Hinata, a member of the school's library committee, and talented manga artist. She has a crush on Hinata, but after Mariabell's arrival and having seen them interact, she realizes that her chances of winning his heart are slim. After Mariabell has accidentally revealed herself as a real dark elf to her, Sakura - who is a fantasy otaku - has become fascinated by her and has since made friends with her.
Cecile (セシル, Seshiru)
Voiced by: Hinako Takahashi (Japanese); Shelby Blocker (English)
A priestess in the adventuring party which Hinata joined in the other world. Despite being her teammate, she intensely dislikes Mariabell, a feeling that is mutual. She and Mei are later sent to Earth to keep an eye on Mariabell and Hinata by order of their government, who fear incursions when their world's existence becomes known to the Earthlings.
Mei (メイ)
Voiced by: Ayumi Mano (Japanese); Christina Kelly (English)
A catgirl rogue in the adventuring party which Hinata joined in the other world.
Miranellia (ミラネリア, Miraneria)
Mariabell's mother. She tends to get very emotional, and occasionally loses control of her magic in such situations. After Mariabell emigrated to Earth, she impulsively followed her daughter to bring her back, and after learning of Sakura's crush on Hinata, she plots to bring them together so she can take her daughter home. It is hinted that she once had a relationship with a human as well, who died of old age while she as an elf remained young, thus explaining her attachment to Mariabell. She is usually referred to as "Mira" (ミラ).

== Media ==
=== Manga ===
Written and illustrated by Nakanosora, Yandere Dark Elf: She Chased Me All the Way From Another World! was serialized on Takeshobo's Web Comic Gamma Plus manga website from September 17, 2021, to September 26, 2025. Takeshobo collected its chapters in five tankōbon volumes, released from November 7, 2022, to November 7, 2025.

The series is licensed in English by Seven Seas Entertainment, who publish it under their Ghost Ship imprint.

==== Volumes ====
No.	Original release date	Original ISBN	North American release date	North American ISBN
1	November 7, 2022	978-4-80197-888-1	October 8, 2024	979-8-89160-602-9
1. "The Girl from Another World" (異世界で出会った女の子, Isekai de Deatta Onnanoko); 2. "A Nice Refreshing (?) Bath" (お風呂でさっぱり?, Ofuro de Sappari?); 3. "If You Look up 'Stalker' in the Dictionary..." (ストーカー? 何それ (略), Sutōkā? Nanisore (Ryaku)); 4. "Let's Go to School!" (学校へ行こう!, Gakkōheikō!); 5. "Gym Class" (たいいくのじかん, Taiiku no Jikan); 6. "Shopping Trip" (おかいもの, Okaimono); Extra Chapter: "Meanwhile, Sakura" (その日の咲良, Sono Hi no Sakura)
2	July 6, 2023	978-4-80198-085-3	January 21, 2025	979-8-89160-603-6
7. "Visitors from Another World" (異世界からのお客さま, Isekai Kara no Okyaku-sama); 8. "Parenting" (こそだて?, Kosodate?); 9. "The Distance Between Us" (キミとの距離, Kimi to no Kyori); 10. "Allure of the Ocean" (海の誘惑?, Umi no Yūwaku?); 11. "Our Fateful Encounter" (キミと出逢えて, Kimi to Deaete); 12. "Searching" (さがしもの, Sagashimono); Extra Chapter: "Meet the Neighbors" (お隣さんの日常, Otonari-san no Nichijō)
3	September 6, 2024	978-4-80198-446-2	August 26, 2025	979-8-89373-287-0
13. "Mom" (異お母さんと, Okaasan to); 14. "Memories" (は思い出, Omoide); 15. "Mother & Daughter" (母と娘, Haha to Musume); 16. "Meet the Parents" (ご挨拶, Go Aisatsu); 17. "Please Remember" (覚えていてほしいこと, Oboete ite Hoshii Koto); 18. "Salesgirl Debut 1" (売り子デビュー①, Uriko Debyū 1); 19. "Salesgirl Debut 2" (売り子デビュー②, Uriko Debyū 2); Extra Chapter: "After the Event" (祭りのあとで, Matsuri no Ato de)
4	March 6, 2025	978-4-80198-579-7	January 20, 2026	979-8-89561-586-7
20. "Through This Year and the Next" (今年もその先も, Kotoshi mo Sonosaki mo); 21. "Live Stream Debut" (配信でびゅー?, Haishin Debyū?); 22. "Independent Woman" (キャリアウーマン, Kyariaūman); 23. "If This Moment Could Last Forever" (こんな時間がいつまでも, Konna Jikan ga Itsumade mo); 24. "To Tell You How I Feel 1" (届けたい想い①, Todoketai Omoi 1); 25. "To Tell You How I Feel 2" (届けたい想い②, Todoketai Omoi 2); Extra Chapter: "The Neighbors: What Happened Next" (その後のお隣, Sonogo no Otonari)
5	November 7, 2025	978-4-80198-817-0	October 20, 2026	979-8-89765-389-8
26. "Dark Shadow" (黒い影, Kuroi Kage); 27. "Decision" (選択, Sentaku); 28. "A World of Our Own" (2人だけの世界, Futari Dake no Sekai); 29. "Because You Were There" (君がいてくれたから, Kimi ga Ite Kureta Kara); 30. "A Future with You" (これからも君と, Korekara mo Kimi to); Extra Chapter: "The Sunohara Family" (春原家の日常, Sunohara-ka no Nichijō)

=== Anime ===
An anime television series adaptation produced under WWWave Corporation's new Deregula anime label was announced on September 6, 2024. The series was animated by Elias and directed by Toshikatsu Tokoro, with Yuki Takabayashi handling series composition, Kazuhiko Tamura designing the characters, and Chihiro Endō composing the music. The series aired from April 7 to June 23, 2025, on Tokyo MX and other networks. (Note: Tokyo MX and BS11 listed the series premiere on April 6, 2025, at 25:05, which is effectively April 7 at 1:05 a.m. JST.) The opening theme song is "Omoi Ai" (オモイアイ; "Heavy Love"), performed by Miyabi (of the Hatenko fu-fu music duo), while the ending theme song is "Sunadokei" (砂時計; "Hourglass"), performed by Kecori. Sentai Filmworks licensed the series in North America for streaming on Hidive.

==== Episodes ====
No.	Title	Directed by	Storyboarded by	Original release date
1	"A Girl I Met in Another World"; Transliteration: "Isekai de Deatta Onnanoko" (Japanese: 異世界で出会った女の子)	Toshikatsu Tokoro	Toshikatsu Tokoro	April 7, 2025
Hinata Sunohara, a Japanese high schooler, was summoned to a magical world to help vanquish a powerful Demon Lord. After the Lord is slain, Hinata is transported back to Earth, much to the dismay of his teammate, the dark elf Mariabell, also known as "Bell", who has fallen obsessively in love with him. One month later, Hinata is startled to discover that Bell has used her magic to follow him back to his apartment through a portal, completely naked. Though flabbergasted by her blatant advances, he gives her clothes and food and then helps her bathe. She tries to seduce him, but he slips and hits his head. She rests his head on her lap and swears she will never leave him.
2	"Academy Life"; Transliteration: "Tsūgaku" (Japanese: つうがく)	Shin Na-ra	Toshikatsu Tokoro	April 14, 2025
Hinata goes to school, but Bell secretly sticks a talisman on him to allow her to spy on him. His classmate Sakura Mochida tries to flirt with him, and Bell is furious when they trip and he accidentally sees Sakura's panties. When he comes home, she confronts him about his "cheating" on her and declares she will go to school with him. Bell uses fake papers to become a new transfer student, and everyone thinks she is a cosplayer. Hinata urges her to make friends, but she only cares about him. When Sakura tries to talk to him, Bell tries to fire an energy blast at her until Hinata intervenes. Sakura is a fan of fantasy settings and excited to learn magic is real, asks to be friends. Bell remembers how she had no friends except for her teammates and agrees, making Hinata happy.
3	"Shopping"; Transliteration: "Okaimono" (Japanese: おかいもの)	Maki Kamiya	Maki Kamiya	April 21, 2025
Bell does poorly at P.E. since she is not athletic, but she cheats using magic to try to impress Hinata. When she twists her ankle, he carries her to the nurse's office and treats it. He kisses her foot, then kisses her all over her body until Sakura walks in on them. He later asks Sakura to help shop for clothes and other supplies for Bell. Sakura asks her about her relationship with Hinata, and Bell says she fell in love with him when he saved her from bullying humans. When the shopping is done and Sakura goes home, Hinata takes Bell to a beautiful lake to cheer her up and kisses her cheek. They are about to kiss on the lips when they have to dodge an energy blast. It came from their other teammates Cecile and Mei, who have come to take Bell home.
4	"Visitors from Another World"; Transliteration: "Isekai Kara no Okyaku-sama" (Japanese: 異世界からのお客さま)	Yūsuke Onoda	Toshikatsu Tokoro	April 28, 2025
Bell is furious that her time with Hinata was interrupted and tries to attack Cecile and Mei, but a crowd gathers, so they go to Hinata's apartment. Cecile explains their government wants Bell back because her presence risks the secret of their world being revealed to Earth. Bell does not care and challenges Cecile to a fight, as they had always hated each other. Hinata stops the fight by claiming responsibility for Bell and swearing to keep her origins secret, so Cecile and Mei leave. Bell tries to seduce him again, but finds Cecile put a force field around his crotch that prevents her from fully undressing him. The next day, Cecile and Mei, dressed like Earthlings, inform them their government told them to monitor them, so they will be their next-door neighbors, much to Bell's chagrin.
5	"The Neighbor"; Transliteration: "Otonari-san" (Japanese: おとなりさん)	Shin Na-ra	Toshikatsu Tokoro	May 5, 2025
Cecile continues to interfere with Bell's attempts to seduce Hinata before going to her stressful office job. Mei uses funds won from her streaming service to get the four of them a trip to a hot spring. Cecile stops Bell from peeping on Hinata. As they eat, Hinata films an episode of Mei's streaming channel with Bell and Cecile as guest stars, which Sakura watches from her bath, but they accidentally spill food on and expose themselves. As they bathe again, Mei says she created her streaming channel to make people happy. They notice Bell is missing and catch her trying to seduce Hinata in a private hot tub, but Mei and Cecile decide to join them in the tub. As they go home, Cecile wishes Bell luck with her relationship with Hinata.
6	"Parenting"; Transliteration: "Kosodate" (Japanese: こそだて)	Shigeki Awai	Toshikatsu Tokoro	May 12, 2025
Bell dreams of having a child with Hinata before she wakes up to find Hinata and Sakura with a baby. She assumes Hinata cheated on her until Sakura clarifies the baby is her aunt's daughter, Natsuki, whom she is looking after and asked Hinata for help. Bell gets along well with Natsuki and breastfeeds her to calm her down. Sakura teaches Bell how to change diapers. As the girls bathe, Bell reconsiders having children because of how much work caring for them takes. While Natsuki and Bell take a nap, Sakura asks Hinata if he and Bell are dating. He denies it, which makes her think she has a chance. When the girls see him feeding Natsuki, they both decide they want to have a child with him. When Sakura and Natsuki go home, Bell tries to seduce Hinata and forcefully breastfeeds him. Sakura returns, having forgotten Natsuki's pacifier, and is shocked to see them like this while Hinata frantically says it is not what it looks like.
7	"Love and Illness"; Transliteration: "Koi to Yamai" (Japanese: 恋と病)	Maki Kamiya	Maki Kamiya	May 19, 2025
After Cecile goes to work, Bell frantically calls Mei because Hinata has a fever. Mei says to just wait until Cecile comes home so she can heal him, and to feed him light foods like rice porridge until then. Bell does not know how to cook and asks Mei to do it, but she is busy filming a collab project. Bell goes shopping for food, but does not know her way around until Sakura shows up to help. They find Hinata is sweaty and give him a sponge bath, and he has an erotic dream of both Bell and Sakura seducing him. He wakes up and they feed him rice porridge that Sakura helped Bell make. He is sweaty again so he bathes and cannot stop thinking about the erotic dream. Bell tries to join him, but he leaves and makes her and Sakura bathe together. Bell can tell Sakura likes someone, unaware it is Hinata, and urges her to ask him out. Cecile and Mei visit, but Hinata has already recovered. Sakura is starstruck to meet Mei, being a fan of her livestreams.
8	"Debut as a Vendor Part 1"; Transliteration: "Uriko Debyū Zenpen" (Japanese: 売り子デビュー・前編)	Yūsuke Onoda	Yūsuke Onoda	May 26, 2025
Sakura creates a doujinshi about a heroic swordswoman, basing the heroine on Bell. She asks Bell and Hinata to help her sell them at an anime convention and they agree. They go to Sakura's house to take measurements so they can cosplay as her characters, but Bell shocks them by casually stripping naked and forcing Sakura to strip as well. She then tries to get Hinata to strip. At the convention, Hinata is uncomfortable with cosplaying as a female character, but Sakura and Bell pervertedly will not let him change. Sakura's manga is a success and many copies are sold. During a break, Hinata and Bell comment all the costumes remind them of their old adventure. She tries to seduce him, but the break is over and they have to help Sakura sell her manga. Cecile and Mei, wearing their adventurer clothes, approach the convention.
9	"Debut as a Vendor Part 2"; Transliteration: "Uriko Debyū Kōhen" (Japanese: 売り子デビュー・後編)	Shin Na-ra	Hitoyuki Matsui	June 2, 2025
Cecile and Mei arrive and help Hinata, Bell, and Sakura until the doujinshi is sold out. Bell soon suffers a wardrobe malfunction. Ando, an agent for a publishing company called Takeshobo, offers Sakura a job, which she will consider. When the group heads outside to take pictures, Bell turns herself and Hinata invisible to try to seduce him, becoming amused to learn he was wearing lingerie under his dress. However, Cecile catches them and stops Bell. As they take pictures, Hinata notices a pervert taking upskirt photos of Bell. Enraged, he confronts and has him arrested, making Bell call him her hero. While heading home, Sakura says he is her hero as well. As she walks away, Hinata becomes upset.
10	"The Distance Between Us"; Transliteration: "Kimi to no Kyori" (Japanese: キミとの距離)	Shin Na-ra	Toshikatsu Tokoro	June 9, 2025
Bell receives offers to be a model or actress and flattery from store owners, but she ignores them. At school, Sakura explains that Bell is dominating social media ever since the anime convention. Bell receives several love letters, but she burns them, declaring Hinata is the only one she loves. After P.E., Bell corners Hinata in a shed and tries to seduce him. When he runs, she enchants a rope to snare him, but snares Sakura by accident. Bell feeds Sakura her lunch as an apology, then goes to meet some girls about joining clubs, but Hinata becomes upset. As they walk home, a boy confesses his feelings for Bell, who lets him down gently and tells him not to give up on love. At home, Hinata confesses he feels jealous of all the attention Bell has been getting, feeling like they are drifting apart. She assures that she loves him and tries to seduce him, but he freaks out and runs to bed, saying he needs to sort out his feelings.
11	"The Temptation of the Sea?"; Transliteration: "Umi no Yūwaku?" (Japanese: 海の誘惑？)	Maki Kamiya	Toshikatsu Tokoro	June 16, 2025
Hinata starts avoiding Bell as a heatwave strikes, so Sakura suggests they go to the beach. After shopping for swimsuits, Hinata, Bell, Sakura, Cecile, and Mei go to the beach. Bell tries to seduce Hinata by using illusions to change her clothes. When it is time to put on sunscreen, Hinata runs away. Bell laments that Hinata hates her, but Sakura tells her to believe in him. They cook some barbecue, but Bell corners Hinata in the showers and demands to know why he keeps avoiding her. She then hugs him and declares her love. When he assures that he does not hate her, she tries to seduce him until Cecile interrupts. Mei challenges everyone to a swimming race, but Bell says she cannot swim, which shocks Hinata and Sakura.
12	"I'm Glad I Met You"; Transliteration: "Kimi to Deaete" (Japanese: キミと出逢えて)	Shin Na-ra	Toshikatsu Tokoro	June 23, 2025
Hinata and Sakura try to teach Bell how to swim, but she argues she has no need because she has a spell that allows walking on water. The others remind her that she cannot use magic in public, then Sakura finds an inner tube for Bell. They resume having fun and see a dolphin during a jet ski ride. The group has a swimming race to a rock, but the dolphin helps Bell and Sakura win, before suddenly stealing Sakura's top. Since they are far enough away from the public, Bell uses her walk on water spell on her party, allowing them to catch the dolphin and retrieve Sakura's top. As the sun goes down, Sakura gives Hinata her blessing to be with Bell, so he confesses his feelings and they kiss. Hinata and Bell start dating and she clings to him at school. Mei edits together photos from the beach trip and sends them to Cecile at her office. Sakura works on a new doujinshi. After Hinata and Bell have dinner, Bell suddenly strips them naked and demands that Hinata get her pregnant. As they kiss, Hinata narrates that Bell is slightly crazy, but he loves her.
