= Motto To Love Ru =

- Season 2
- The first DVD volume compilation cover of Motto To Love Ru.
- No. of episodes: 12

Release
- Original network: Tokyo MX, Chiba TV, SUN, TVA, AT-X
- Original release: October 6 – December 22, 2010

Season chronology
- ← Previous; Season 1 Next → Darkness

To Love Ru is an anime series based on the manga of the same name written by Saki Hasemi and illustrated by Kentaro Yabuki.

The second season of the anime series, titled Motto To Love Ru (もっとTo LOVEる -とらぶる-, More To Love Ru -trouble-), was produced by Xebec and directed by Atsushi Ōtsuki. It aired for 12 episodes between October 6 and December 22, 2010, and would mark the beginning of the anime strictly adhering to the manga. The opening theme for the second season is "Loop-the-Loop" by Kotoko and the ending theme is "Baby Baby Love" by Tomatsu. Sentai Filmworks have licensed the second season and released the complete series set on DVD on April 3, 2012; the Blu-ray set was released on May 27, 2014 while the series was re-released complete with an English dub on February 16, 2021.

== Episode list ==
No. overall	No. in season	Title	Original release date
27	1	"Once More, From Here"; Transliteration: "Mō Ichido Koko Kara" (Japanese: もう一度ここから)	October 6, 2010
27	1	"War at the Public Bath"; Transliteration: "Ofuroba Sensō" (Japanese: お風呂場戦争)	October 6, 2010
27	1	"Tick Tock Tick Tock, the Sound of Love♡"; Transliteration: "Chikutaku Chikutaku Koi no Oto♡" (Japanese: チクタク チクタク 恋の音♡)	October 6, 2010
Lala and Rito run late to school and end up at the place where Rito first confessed to her. Lala expresses her true feelings for Rito. Wasting no more time, Lala uses a new invention to teleport them to school. Although it allows Lala to specify a distance, they end up naked to school, with Rito teleporting right under Haruna's skirt, who slaps him and runs off. Lala then embraces Rito and says that she loves him, with the entire student body as a witness. Lala and the others go to a public bathhouse. Two bounty hunters, Tiger and Panther who are after Yami attach a body controlling device to Rito and use him as a puppet to attack her. Realizing that Yami will not attack Rito, they began to mess with the other girls. Mikan discovers their hiding spot and Lala overrides their signal with a more powerful controller and has Rito beat them. Yui and the discipline committee implement a demerit policy to ensure the morality of the school. Yui starts to deduct points for any signs of misbehavior and confiscates one of Lala's inventions. While walking home Yui gets caught in the rain and ends up sheltering in the same place as Rito who becomes flustered over Yui's wet t-shirt and offers her his handkerchief to dry off. After almost being seen by the Principal, Yui also becomes flustered at being so close to Rito and leaves, deducting 8 points from herself for being attracted to Rito while also keeping his handkerchief. Rito is blown up by Lala's invention Yui had dropped.
28	2	"Those Warped into the Midst of Darkness"; Transliteration: "Kurayami no Naka de Utsuru Mono" (Japanese: 暗闇の中でうつるもの)	October 13, 2010
28	2	"Welcome to the Yuuki Household!"; Transliteration: "Yōkoso! Yūki-ke e" (Japanese: ようこそ!結城家へ)	October 13, 2010
28	2	"Sleepover Party"; Transliteration: "Otomarikai" (Japanese: お泊り会)	October 13, 2010
Lala accidentally drops all her gadgets at school. As Rito tries to keep Haruna away from Lala's dangerous gadgets, Rito and Haruna accidentally activate the warp ring, sending both of them to an unknown location naked. Though initially embarrassed toward each other, Haruna and Rito start talking about their pasts but are discovered by Ryouko before they can become closer, as the unknown location was in the basement at her clinic. Haruko, Mikan's teacher, wants to visit Saibai (Mikan and Rito's dad) because she is a fan of his manga. Due to a new deadline, Saibai is unable to visit. Lala dresses Rito up as Saibai to meet with Haruko, but Rito is too nervous. Lala feeds him a relaxing drug that accidentally gets him drunk and he ends up embarrassing both Haruko and Mikan. Lala and Mikan invite Haruna and Yami to a sleepover party. After a big dinner, Rito decides to take a bath. However, Lala, who does not know Rito is in the bath, enlarges the bathroom so all the girls can bathe together (with Rito still inside). Although the enlarged bathroom is large enough for Rito to hide from the girls, Peke accidentally deactivates Lala's controller restoring the bathroom to its original size with Rito and the girls all naked together in the bath. Yami, who believes Rito is being perverted, chases him.
29	3	"Magic Love Potion♡"; Transliteration: "Tokkō yaku♡" (Japanese: 特恋薬♡)	October 20, 2010
29	3	"What I See Through the Lens is..." Transliteration: "Renzu Goshi ni Miru Kimi wa..." (Japanese: レンズ越しに見る君は...)	October 20, 2010
29	3	"You are the Lovely Cinderella♡"; Transliteration: "Itoshi no Kimi wa Shinderera♡" (Japanese: 愛しの君はシンデレラ♡)	October 20, 2010
Rito is assigned to deliver important papers to Yui who is sick at home. Yuu, Yui's brother invites Rito to Yui's bedroom. Yui is uncomfortable with Rito in her room and panics leading to Rito accidentally touching Yui's breast in front of Yuu, giving him the wrong impression about their relationship. Later, Lala and the others visit Yui to cheer her up. Rito puts on a pair of glasses he finds in Lala's room. However, the glasses lock on to Rito's head and he can't take them off. Mikan comes into his room to empty his trash in her underwear, acting like there is nothing out of the ordinary. He quickly realizes that the glasses let him see through people's clothes to their underwear. Rito struggles, even more, when he accidentally adjusts the settings causing him to see everyone completely naked. Lala arrives to help remove the glasses until Run interferes and accidentally transforms into Ren while falling onto Rito who, still wearing the glasses on the naked setting, sees up his skirt. Saruyama wants to see Riko having fallen in love with her at first sight. Lala sets up a date by forcefully transforming Rito into a girl and having him meet up with Saruyama at a specified time and place. Saruyama and Riko go out on a date to places such as a love movie. By the end of the day when Saruyama was about to confess to Riko the effects wear off and Rito, having turned back into a boy, runs away before Saruyama hugs him. Haruna ends up seeing Rito wearing a skirt.
30	4	"Yami-Yami Fashion"; Transliteration: "Yami-Yami Fasshon" (Japanese: ヤミヤミファッション)	October 27, 2010
30	4	"Wonderful Love♡"; Transliteration: "Wandafuru Rabu♡" (Japanese: ワンダフル·ラブ♡)	October 27, 2010
30	4	"Twins Escape"; Transliteration: "Tsuinzu Esukeipu" (Japanese: ツインズ☆エスケイプ)	October 27, 2010
Risa and Mio find Yami reading fashion magazines. As Yami always wears the same battle dress, Risa and Mio bring her to a clothes shop and try to find her a new style. Yami finds some attractive new clothes but accidentally tears her new skirt protecting Rito from delinquents. In the end, she reverts to her normal clothes but ends up punching Rito when he sees she is wearing new frilly panties under her battle dress. When Haruna takes her dog, Maron, out for a walk she feels that someone is stalking her. She finds Oshizu on her break from Mikado-sensei's clinic and asks for help. Lala helps Haruna by making a machine that switches their bodies. Using the bait trick, Lala and Oshizu defeat the stalker. The stalker turns out to be a female dog-like alien who is actually in love with Maron, though Oshizu beats her up anyway as she is terrified of dogs. Gid orders Zastin to retrieve Nana and Momo, because they escaped avoiding studying the Royal Lineage of Deviluke. Nana and Momo hide in Rito's bathroom and the former beat him up when he sees them naked. Zastin appears and chases them to a bridge where Nana and Momo use their Pe-dials to summon dangerous animals and plants to attack Zastin and his assistants and Rito as well. Zastin is forced to admit defeat and Nana and Momo remodel Rito's house so they can live with Lala on earth.
31	5	"Queen of Love!?"; Transliteration: "Ren'ai Kuīn!?" (Japanese: 恋愛クイーン!?)	November 3, 2010
31	5	"Let's Play ♪"; Transliteration: "Oyūgi Shimasho ♪" (Japanese: お遊戯しましょ♪)	November 3, 2010
31	5	"Sweet Feelings are a Taste of Chocolate"; Transliteration: "Amai Kimochi wa Choko no Aji" (Japanese: 甘い気持ちはチョコの味)	November 3, 2010
Saki daydreams of Zastin. Her servants, Aya and Rin, help by kidnapping Rito, who is hiding from Lala and her lethal cooking. Aya and Rin demand Rito bring Zastin to school. When Zastin arrives, Saki tries to confess to him but gets interrupted by Lala who has found Rito and attempts to feed him her lunch, causing Rito to run in panic towards Saki, exposing her panties to an embarrassed Zastin. Rito is chased by all four girls while Zastin leaves. Run tries to defeat Lala with an alien skunk that will gas Lala turning her into a child, making her weak. However, the skunk gases Run into a child then escapes and cause chaos at school by gassing everybody into children except Haruna who has to take care of them all. Run tries to catch the skunk and nearly falls off the top of the building. Lala, also a child, rescues Run and catches the skunk, but then accidentally drops Run off the roof anyway. Yui watches everyone prepare for Valentine's Day and decides to make some chocolate for Rito, though she struggles to make it properly. Yui finishes the chocolate but is too nervous to actually give it to Rito, instead of yelling at the terrified and apologetic Rito several times. Watching other girls easily deliver their chocolates to Rito and how happy it makes him, Yui finally gains the confidence to give him her chocolates.
32	6	"Beach Girls♡"; Transliteration: "Bīchi Gāruzu♡" (Japanese: ビーチ·ガールズ♡)	November 10, 2010
32	6	"Night Tutor"; Transliteration: "Shin'ya no Katei Kyōshi" (Japanese: 深夜の家庭教師)	November 10, 2010
32	6	"Master of Love"; Transliteration: "Ren'ai Masutā" (Japanese: 恋愛マスター)	November 10, 2010
Rito and the others visit Saki's private beach. Oshizu forces Rito to apply suntan oil to the half-naked Ryouko until an angry Yui intervenes. Saki tries to beat Lala in her Watermelon Split contest, but Rito, thrown into the air by Nana, destroys all the watermelons. Momo summons an alien watermelon instead-but Saki insults it, causing it to attack everyone. After Rito is put in danger trying to protect Lala, Yami suddenly splits the angry watermelon in half, believing the watermelon attack was simply part of the game. Haruna receives a 98 on a math test while Rito receives an abysmal 18. He bumps into Yami, who tells him to seek Lala for help. To Rito's surprise, Lala had received a perfect 100. Peke explains to Rito about Lala's genius intellect. Despite Lala helping Rito study for tomorrow's exam, he is distracted by Lala being naked once again and completely forgets everything she had taught him. Rito continuing to become flustered has led to no progress being made in Lala's relationship with him. Risa and Mio help Lala by giving her a book on seduction techniques. While on a date Lala tries many methods, but only makes Rito angry after accidentally injuring him again. Lala tries the "Tsundere Trick" and almost succeeds in seducing Rito but forgets the next step, ruining the mood. Having failed, Lala cries. With some subtle help from Peke Rito sees the seduction book and admits that he enjoyed the date, inspiring Lala to keep trying.
33	7	"Yami's Clinic"; Transliteration: "Yami no Shinryōjo" (Japanese: 闇の診療所)	November 17, 2010
33	7	"Hostile Feelings"; Transliteration: "Tekitaishin" (Japanese: 敵対心)	November 17, 2010
33	7	"A Strange Haruna"; Transliteration: "Okashi na Haruna-chan" (Japanese: おかしな春菜ちゃん)	November 17, 2010
After another incident in the library, Yami tries to kill Rito but is too weak to control her weapons. Rito notices Yami's high fever and rushes her to the clinic with the help of Lala. Rito ends up semi-catatonic when he is made to help Ryouko remove Yami's clothes. During treatment, Ryouko tells Yami how Rito helped her and she should thank him. Yami does not understand why Rito continues to treat her as a friend when she is trying to kill him. She then tries to kill him again when he sees her getting dressed. Run unwillingly stars as the scantily clad villain in the next Magical Kyouko episode. Run becomes jealous when Kyouko, the heroine, receives all the praise while she receives all the criticism. Kyouko then eats lunch with Run and tells her that she's actually one of her fans. When the Principal attacks Run in a lust fuelled frenzy, Kyouko reveals that her ability to control fire is real and that she is half human and half flame jinn. Run reveals her identity as an alien and they become friends. On the way to school, Haruna notices a dog running around her. When Lala and Rito meet up with Haruna, Haruna acts strange, even groping Risa and Mio and stealing Yui's bra. Haruna then confesses to Rito, shocking him. When Rito tries to confess back, Haruna freaks out from seeing some dogs and Rito sees Oshizu leaving Haruna's body. Oshizu explains she had been running away from the dog Haruna saw earlier and accidentally possessed her before deciding to have fun with Haruna's body. She also explains she only confessed to Rito because it was something Haruna secretly wanted to do, which embarrasses Haruna. Risa and Mio happily welcome back the real Haruna.
34	8	"Grow Bigger ♪"; Transliteration: "Ōkiku Nāre ♪" (Japanese: 大きくなぁーれ♪)	November 24, 2010
34	8	"Wan-derful Life"; Transliteration: "Wandafuru Raifu" (Japanese: ワンダフルライフ)	November 24, 2010
34	8	"The Trance of Feelings"; Transliteration: "Kibun wa Toransu" (Japanese: 気分はトランス)	November 24, 2010
Hearing about Risa and Mio talk about a perfect body, Haruna thinks about her bust in relation to Lala and how she's failed to enlarge them, though she is happy when Rito says he values personality more than he does breast size. She and Oshizu find Nana angry about Momo teasing her for having a flat chest. Nana works together with Haruna and Oshizu to enlarge their breasts. After many attempts, Haruna tells Nana to stop and quotes Rito that personality matters more. Haruna finds a helpless stray dog with Maron and takes him in for care. Maron asks the dog about his origin, who turns out to be Rito stuck inside a dog's body thanks to another Lala invention. Haruna takes Rito into the shower with her to clean him up. Maron tries to teach Rito how to act like a dog and has him lick Haruna as a way of showing affection. However, Rito becomes overwhelmed and flees. Lala finds Rito and puts him back in his own body, offering to turn him into a cat next time. Mikan wishes to change bodies with Yami to experience her abilities. Yami agrees and Lala performs the change. With switched bodies, Mikan struggles to control Yami's abilities and has to escape the principal. Yami, on the other hand, easily beats up the Principal without her abilities and learns about siblings and caring from Rito, who does not know about the body swap and thinks Mikan is sick or depressed. Afterward, Yami admits she has learned new things about Rito and is slightly envious Mikan has him as her brother.
35	9	"For Whom the Bell Tolls"; Transliteration: "Dare ga Tame ni Beru wa Naru" (Japanese: 誰がためにベルは鳴る)	December 1, 2010
35	9	"Troubling Rampage?"; Transliteration: "Meiwaku Bōsō?" (Japanese: 迷惑暴走?)	December 1, 2010
35	9	"Loving Idol"; Transliteration: "Koigokoro Aidoru" (Japanese: 恋心アイドル)	December 1, 2010
Christmas Day is approaching. Rito plans to invite Yami to their Christmas party to make Mikan happy and also invites Haruna who he meets shopping. Mikan explains to Lala about Christmas. Mikan and Rito never had a big Christmas celebration since their parents are rarely home, so this is Mikan and Rito's first big Christmas celebration with friends. Lala makes Mikan's wish come true by bringing her parents home for Christmas. In the end, Rito gets in trouble with his mother, who demands to know who Celine's mother is. Momo accidentally uses a device that transports Rito into Peke's body. Hoping not to upset Lala, Momo brings Peke to Lala in time for P.E. and tells Rito to act like Peke. Lala's warm-up stretches shock Rito as he feels her entire body with his own. When Lala jogs, Rito becomes so flustered he malfunctions and causes havoc by changing Lala's P.E. clothes into a bikini, which is so tight it wedges itself between her buttocks. This causes Rito to panic even more and he ends up changing the clothes of every girl in the class. Now completely euphoric from feeling Lala's body, Rito passes out and deactivates, leaving Lala naked. Momo brings a replacement outfit to Lala and vows to repair Peke. Run begs Rito to pretend to be her boyfriend because she lied to Kyouko about being in a relationship. Rito accepts. As Rito and Run walk with Kyouko, the principal attacks. Run accidentally strips her and Kyouko with clothes dissolving bomb that she had mistaken for a pervert repellent bomb. After torching the principal, Kyouko tells Run that she knows Run lied about having a boyfriend. Rito brings Lala to restore their clothes, but Lala hypes over Kyouko instead.
36	10	"Pollen Telepathy"; Transliteration: "Kafun Denshin" (Japanese: 花粉伝心)	December 8, 2010
36	10	"A Girl's Feelings"; Transliteration: "Onna no Ko no Kimochi" (Japanese: オンナノコノキモチ)	December 8, 2010
36	10	"Heart Throbbing E-Mail"; Transliteration: "Dokidoki☆Mēru" (Japanese: ドキドキ☆メール)	December 8, 2010
Rito takes Celine out for a walk and meets up with Yui. As Yui argues with another person about Rito and her being a couple and Celine their daughter, Celine wanders off and steals a Cola. She drinks it and, being a part plant, becomes drunk from the sugar and begins spreading pollen everywhere that immediately makes people fall in love with Rito. Saki and the others get infected by the pollen and fall for Rito along with an entire street full of passers-by. Rito tries to escape but gets tackled by the principal who is thankfully arrested by the police. Back home Momo explains the victims of Celine's pollen likely fell in love with Rito because Celine loves Rito the most. Rito is assigned to shop for groceries but gets intercepted by Risa who uses him to get rid of another guy. Risa returns the favor by taking him to Mio's workplace, a maid café. Risa tests Rito's reaction to girls, leading him by love hotels and to her house where she takes him into her bedroom. After Risa finishes toying with him, Rito arrives home late with no shopping done. Back in her bedroom, Risa appears to regret not having gone further with Rito. Rito requests from Yui a book titled "Midnight Date" for his dad's manga and hands her his contact info. Yui contacts Rito with a text message about the book, but Rito is too sleepy and wants Momo to answer. Momo misinterprets the message as being about an actual date between Rito and Yui and responds awkwardly. Yui in turn misinterprets Momo's awkward response to mean more than it does. Nana takes Rito's cellphone and asks a more provocative question about breasts. Celine then steals the phone and sends a nude photo of Lala to Yui.
37	11	"All Quiet on the "Sister" Front"; Transliteration: "'Imōto' Sensen Ijō Ari" (Japanese: 「妹」戦線異状アリ)	December 15, 2010
37	11	"The False Love?"; Transliteration: "Itsuwari no Koi?" (Japanese: 偽りの恋?)	December 15, 2010
37	11	"Romantic Forecast"; Transliteration: "Ren'ai Yohō" (Japanese: 恋愛予報)	December 15, 2010
Mikan turns down another love confession and starts thinking about her feelings for Rito. She becomes jealous of Momo being close to Rito and sneaking into his bed at night. Mikan tries to uncover Momo's secrets by sneaking into Rito's bed herself to catch Momo sneaking in. Instead, she experiences Rito's more hands on sleeping personality. Seeing no signs of Momo, Mikan tries to leave only to be frightened by thunder. She is surprised when Rito hugs and comforts her so she won't be scared, even though he is still asleep. The next day, Rito panics over finding Mikan in his bed and that Momo had been watching them. Rito and Lala try to catch Celine who is drunk on Cola again, but Celine spreads her pollen on Yami, making her fall in love with Rito, which quite rightly terrifies him. Yami borrows the terrified Rito for a date and tries to understand love by feeding Rito taiyaki and trying to kiss him. On returning to normal Yami beats him up again but wants to know why he didn't kiss her. Rito says it was because you don't kiss someone who isn't thinking normally. He is then shocked when Yami smiles at him and then assures him that he's still her target, which terrifies him once more. Nana, unable to understand why so many girls like Rito, storms out of the house after catching Momo sneaking into Rito's bed again. She then rescues Maron from a car. As Nana collects information from Maron, Haruna finds him and takes Nana into her apartment where she meets Haruna's older sister, Akiho. Nana and Haruna talk about their viewpoints on Rito, prompting Nana to return home but ends up caught in the rain. Rito then appears with a spare umbrella for her, though they end up arguing again. Haruna, knowing that she cannot continue to hide her feelings, tells Lala that she likes Rito too.
38	12	"I Love You♡"; Transliteration: "Daisuki♡" (Japanese: 大スキ♡)	December 22, 2010
Starting from where the last segment of episode 11 left off, Lala accepts Haruna's feelings and vows to help her have her own relationship with Rito. At the water park, Yami is less violent towards Rito than normal and Haruna and Lala are noticeably closer. Yui is flustered at being around Rito in her bikini. Saruyama observes Rito and tells him that he has changed after Lala came around as Rito is more comfortable being with girls. Rito tries to understand the values of Lala. Nearby, Run and Kyouko perform a concert when an alien amoeba attacks and suffocates everyone. Lala tries to rescue Haruna, who gets eaten by the amoeba but suffocates. Rito sacrifices himself to rescue Lala and Haruna. As Haruna and Lala try to rescue Rito from death, Rito sees flashbacks and realizes that he loves Lala too. After the amoeba was defeated by Yami and Lala, Rito tells Lala in private that he loves her, but loves Haruna too. Lala happily proposes that Rito marry both of them. Peke says, "Since the marriage between Rito-Dono and Lala-Sama will make him the king of universe earth rules won't matter anymore". Before Rito could oppose, Lala pushes Rito towards Haruna so he could confess to her too. Oshizu accidentally rips Haruna's swimsuit, making her run away before Rito confesses to her. His confession is instead accidentally directed to Nana, Yui, Ryouko, and Run, inspiring Lala to happily suggest that Rito should marry all the girls and then they can all stay together.
