= To Love Ru Darkness (TV series) =

- Season 3
- The first Blu-ray and DVD volume compilation cover of To Love Ru Darkness.
- No. of episodes: 12

Release
- Original network: Tokyo MX, AT-X
- Original release: October 6 – December 29, 2012

Season chronology
- ← Previous; Motto Next → Darkness 2nd

To Love Ru is an anime series based on the manga of the same name written by Saki Hasemi and illustrated by Kentaro Yabuki.

A third season of the anime series, titled To Love Ru Darkness, a sequel manga, was produced by Xebec, directed by Atsushi Ōtsuki, and aired for 12 episodes between October 6 and December 29, 2012. The opening theme for To Love Ru Darkness is "Rakuen Project" (楽園PROJECT) by Ray and the ending theme is "Foul Play ni Kurari" (ファールプレーにくらり) by Kanon Wakeshima. Sentai Filmworks released To Love Ru Darkness on DVD and Blu-ray in North America on July 15, 2014.

== Episode list ==
No. overall	No. in season	Title	Original release date
39	1	"Continue"; Transliteration: "Continue ~Kontinyū~" (Japanese: Continue～コンティニュー～)	October 6, 2012
The story begins with Rito rudely awakened by each Deviluke alien. Rito explains his routine life and is most concerned with Momo due to her deceptive intentions. As Rito arrives at school, he meets Haruna. Lala tries to encourage Rito to confess to her, but Rito pushes Lala to a corner and explains to her the situation is complicated as people are legally allowed to marry one person. Out from nowhere, Celine clings to Rito. Momo and Nana surprise everyone that they have enrolled in their school. Now, students, Momo winks at Rito, reminding him of the conversation last night in the bathtub. Momo overheard Rito's concern about marrying multiple girls and explained to Rito that many girls love him and marrying them all would make everyone happy. As the future king of Deviluke, he can have many concubines. Momo vows to create a harem for Rito. During class, Momo becomes popular among the boys while Nana greets a mysterious girl looking out the window. Nana impresses her with her ability to understand animals. The girl introduces herself as Mea. Later, Momo finds Yami on a bench. As Yami is an obstacle to her harem plan, Momo tries to secretly enlist Yami in her harem plan by convincing her to enroll. The conversation gets cut short when Rito runs in a panic stating that the other boys suddenly went violent. The other boys arrive on the scene and attack Yami, forcing her to use her weapons. After Yami and Momo restrain the boys, Yami hears a mysterious voice reminding her that she's an assassin assigned to kill Rito.
40	2	"Doubt and Dish"; Transliteration: "Dōbt and Dish ~Giwaku to Ryōri~" (Japanese: Doubt and dish～疑惑と料理～)	October 13, 2012
Mea speaks with a mysterious voice about her day. The voice reminds Mea about her job; killing Rito and reverting Yami back to an assassin. Meanwhile, Momo warns the dangers of Yami to Rito and convinces him that Yami may change back and kill him anytime. Next, Momo is surprised to see Mikan kills Yami and uses her properties to make food that changes depending on what you like to eat. Nana also comments about making a new friend to Lala. During the dinner service, Rito freaks out over Yami's Taiyaki soup and thinks she may have set a trap. He nearly vomits and asks to go shopping. During bedtime, Rito finds Momo in his bed. Momo warned Rito earlier that she must protect Rito to allow the harem plan to progress. Yami may kill Rito in his sleep. As Rito tries to sleep, Momo caresses him every way, forcing Rito to shove her aside. As Rito later takes a drink, Yami asks Rito for a talk. Yami explains about her cooking lessons and compares them to her attacks. Momo mistakes it for an assault and jumps down to defend Rito. However, Yami only wanted to know if Rito enjoyed her Taiyaki soup. The next day, Yami also becomes enrolled. Mea finds Yami and explains how she is Yami's sister with similar abilities. During class, Yami does not get along with other students and blocks people from befriending her. Momo offers to help but gets rejected too. Meanwhile, Mea asks Nana about Rito. Nana simply replies, "He's a beast." Her rambling comments about Rito only interest Mea, who then goes to find Rito herself. Momo then talks to Ryouko, who loved Yami being enrolled. She tells Momo how Yami's lifestyle has been only fighting. While Yami is sitting on a bench wondering about her feelings, Yui approaches Yami and tells her that not understanding their own feelings is normal, and she too does not understand her own feelings. Then Nana asks Yami if she's seen Mea. While Rito is asleep on the roof Mea climbs on top of Rito and whispers how she'll be able to know what he's truly like once they are "joined together".
41	3	"Each Speculation"; Transliteration: "Each Speculation ~Sorezore no Omowaku~" (Japanese: Each speculation ～それぞれの思惑～)	October 20, 2012
Rito wakes up in his dream and finds himself inside his bathroom with Mea. Mea tests Rito's beast-like moves and asks Rito if he experienced something similar. She reads Rito's mind about Momo and her harem plan. Back in reality, Yami cuts Mea off from reading Rito's mind and warns her to not bother Rito. Mea walks off and learns about the harem plan and how she and Momo are competing for Yami. Later, Nana introduces Mea to Lala and her friends. Rito sees Mea and realizes her from the dream earlier. As Mea speaks obscenity to Rito, Momo considers adding Mea into her harem plan. Afterschool, Rito spots Yui and offers to walk home together since Mikan is cleaning up Saibai's studio and Momo and Nana are with Lala at an important event. Yui is first skeptical but accepts. Momo secretly escapes from the event, a Magical Kyoko Costume Show, and observes Rito walking home with Yui. She finds this a perfect opportunity to advance her harem plan and devises a way to lure Rito and Yui into Rito's house. She first uses the principal to chase them toward Rito's home and simulates rain to get both of them inside. Inside, Momo surrounds the home with a barrier and creates a romantic scenery by simulating rain and a blackout. Rito accidentally falls onto Yui, giving Momo signs that her romantic scenery is working. She panics when she finds Mikan and the others trying to get inside during the romance. Then, Mea shoots a laser beam and destroys the barrier, breaking Momo's scenery and exposing Rito and Yui to everyone. Lala tells Rito there was no rain today and Mikan sees Momo's tail, adding to her suspicions about Momo. Meanwhile, Mea tells the master, the mysterious voice, she was only messing with Momo's harem plan.
42	4	"True Smile ~Peace and Anxiety~"; Transliteration: "True Smile ~Kako to Tomodachi to Egao to~" (Japanese: True Smile ～過去と友達と笑顔と～)	October 27, 2012
A mysterious assassin named Azenda arrives on earth seeking revenge with Yami. Mea questions her regarding Yami, but the master believes Azenda could help revert Yami into an assassin and kill Rito. Meanwhile, Mikan wakes up to find Celine missing. She hears moaning noises through Rito's room and blasts into his room only to find him playing a game with Momo and Celine. Momo tries to reassure Mikan that she's only supporting Lala's love, but Mikan does not believe it. In the shower, Momo wonders who destroyed her barrier and relates it to fact that someone is targeting Rito and Yami. After another disastrous day at school involving Oshizu using her telekinetic powers on Haruna, Yami feels lonely and visits Mikan. As they both eat Taiyaki, Yami hears Mikan express her concerns about Momo. Mikan gives Yami a Taiyaki keychain and shows her pair to symbolize their friendship. Yami happily accepts. The following night, Rito finds Yami. Rito is happy that she talked to Mikan as Mikan usually feels depressed. Yami feels strange about happiness per Mea's words. Rito assures Yami that she should do what she wants. Suddenly, Azenda appears and confronts Yami. Having observed Yami earlier, she uses Mikan as a marionette to defend herself and attack Yami. Being friends, Yami chooses not to attack, allowing Azenda to easily defeat Yami. Next, Mikan tackles Yami and does obscene gestures, setting them in a perfect position for Azenda to kill them both. Azenda rambles about how she lost her pride after Yami defeated her and uses this chance to get even. Rito tries to stop Azenda explaining that Yami and Mikan do not deserve this, but Azenda chooses to kill Rito instead. At the finale, Momo intercepts her plant monsters and defeats Azenda. Mea sees the fight from a distance and is unsatisfied that Yami did not attack Azenda.
43	5	"A Man? A Woman? ~The Changing Ones~"; Transliteration: "A Man? A Woman? ~Kawari Ikumonotachi~" (Japanese: A man? A Woman? ～変わり行くもの達～)	November 3, 2012
During swimming class, Mea feels dejected about the Azenda fight. Earlier, she tried to convince Yami to revert to a weapon but Yami rejects and explains that there is more in life than fighting. On the other side, Yami talks to Momo regarding Mea's stubbornness about living as a weapon and how she was like her before. Nana finds Mea depressed and looks for ways to cheer her up by asking Rito for advice. Rito suggests doing something fun with Mea, giving Nana an idea. Afterschool, Nana grabs Mea to the riverside where she has an event prepared. At first, Maron hops onto Mea and licks her. Seeing Mea enjoying Maron, Nana adds more fun by bringing out more animals. The animals and Maron become jealous over licking and fight to lick Mea. Haruna and Rito become caught in the fray as well when an octopus and a squid appear. Nana tries to reclaim her De-Dial after a monkey steals it, but the monkey leads her in front of a moving truck. Mea sees Nana in danger and tries to rescue Nana by attacking the driver. However, Yami and Lala stop the truck in time. Nana apologizes for the incident, but Mea thanks Nana for the fun and Lala concludes the operation as successful. The next day, Mea hears the principal talking about his Run poster and asks who Run is. Haruna and Nana explain to Mea that Run is an alien who can switch genders. Lala jumps in and demonstrates that Rito could change genders too. Now Riko, tells Lala to turn her back but the machine fails, forcing them to leave early. Mikan returns and is shocked to find Riko dressed up as a maid. She is more disgusted to find Mea licking Riko. Riko offers Mea tea, but Mea overloads it with sugar cubes and feeds some to Celine, making Celine spit it out at Riko. Now sticky, Riko tries to change out of the outfit but is uncomfortable with looking at her body. Momo sneaks in and thinks that Rito/Riko may be admiring the wonders of a female body.
44	6	"Metamorphose ~Time for a Change...~"; Transliteration: "Metamorphose ~Kawaru Iku Toki...~" (Japanese: Metamorphose ～変わり行く時…～)	November 10, 2012
Momo offers to show her body to Riko. Riko sidetracks by asking where Mea went. Momo replies, "She left." As Momo questions Mea's intentions, she shows Rito the secrets of a female's body by touching her private parts. Mea sneaks in and witnesses Momo's deceptions. Using the memory she got from Rito before, Mea forces Momo to let her in regarding the harem plan. Momo reluctantly accepts, hoping that Mea can get the master to come out. Mea and Momo lick Rito until Riko changes back. Mikan enters the room and is shocked to find Mea and Momo along with a naked Rito. Mea exposes Momo's cover-up, making Mikan scold at all three of them and kick Mea and Momo out of Rito's room. Run stops by Rito's house and wants to ask Rito for advice, but Rito is seemingly occupied at the time. Momo quickly fixes a meet up with Rito, hoping to advance her harem plan. During the meetup, Momo and the others spy on Rito. Mea wants to see kissing while Nana wants to keep Rito from naughty acts. In the cafe, Run asks Rito his opinion about her manager forbidding relationships. Rito tells her not to stress herself, inspiring Run. He causes chaos with Saki, Aya, and Rin, prompting them to escape. Outside, Rito and Run talk about Memoruzians and their ability to change genders. Momo suspects that Rito may be making progress. Run cries admitting that she loves Rito but could not compete with Lala due to her ability to become Ren, therefore making her not completely female. Her idol career also makes it difficult to meet with Rito. Next, Run feels ill; Rito brings her to a nearby bench. Momo and the others catch up with Momo thinking that Rito may be making sexual encounters. Enraged, Nana jumps out to attack Rito only to find Yui stopping Rito too. Suddenly, to everyone's surprise, Run glows and splits from Ren, becoming two bodies. Yami explains from the encyclopedia that Memoruzians split into two different bodies when they reach adulthood using a process called "metamorphosis". Momo finds this outcome rewarding as the Run-Ren transition is no longer an obstacle to her harem plan.
45	7	"Sisters ~The Invention of Happiness~"; Transliteration: "Sisters ~Shiawase no Hatsumeihin~" (Japanese: Sisters ～幸せの発明品～)	November 17, 2012
As Lala fixes up Nana's De-Dial, Momo tells to Nana grow up while looking at her chest, infuriating Nana. Lala brings out an item that grows Nana's breasts, but it only works for a few seconds and shrinks Momo's breasts. Momo sarcastically admits that she understood Nana's feeling. Later in Mikado-sensei's office, Rito and friends discuss Lala's inventions and Oshizu asks about Lala's childhood. Momo recalls the frequent incidents with Lala's inventions; whenever she was fighting with Nana, Lala's inventions ran wild and they both cleaned up Lala's mess. At lunch, Rito and friends visit Mea's apartment. The apartment is empty and Mea notes that she lives alone. Nana finds it strange knowing that Yami is her sister while Momo was hoping to collect more details about the master. In the follow-up meeting with Mikado-sensei and Oshizu, Momo expresses concerns about Mea and how she may be hiding her true heart. Yami notes that their hearts are incomparable to a human's heart because she and Mea are both weapons. Rito invalidates Yami's claim and relates the sibling analogy to Mikan. The meeting is cut short when a dog clings onto Oshizu, making her rip Yami's clothes, causing Yami to chase after Rito. Afterschool, Ren gives Rito Run's CD and explains about Lala's pure sweet child personality. Rito considers it as he thinks about Momo's harem plan. Later at night, Mikan asks Rito to call Lala and her sisters down for dinner. Rito enters Lala's room and finds her fixing an invention. Rito asks Lala when she started making inventions; Lala replies that it naturally came to her whenever she got bored. Momo hears Rito in Lala's room and thinks Lala is about to kiss Rito but rejects the theory. She and Nana listen on. Rito asks Lala about her incidents; Peke replies that they were incentives to reunite Momo and Nana. Remembering what Ren said, Rito panics as he looks at Lala and activates an invention that wraps around Lala and exposes her privates, and proceeds to tie both of them up. Momo and Nana discuss how much Lala cared for them.
46	8	"Bad Mood ~Bonds of Happiness~"; Transliteration: "Bad Mood ~Shiawase no Kizuna~" (Japanese: Bad mood ～幸せの絆～)	December 1, 2012
The episode starts with Rin talking to Saki by phone. In Rito's house, Rito's unconsciously plays with Momo's tail and attempts to kiss her, but Momo stops him. Mikan enters the room and saw them. She feels misplaced after seeing Rito become closer to Momo. She goes shopping and almost passes out on the way home due to the intense sun. Momo runs to save her but Kujou Rin grabs her and offers to take her to her place. Mikan feels the need to vent and starts telling Rin about how she feels misplaced. While Rin expresses negative thoughts about Rito, Mikan explains that despite his perverted actions, Rito is a really great guy. She also tells Rin about how everything seems to have changed since Momo's arrival. Although Mikan appreciates Momo helping around the house with chores, Mikan feels she is no longer needed. Rin tells Mikan that no matter what Momo does if Rito is how Mikan describes him, he would not want Mikan to leave. During the conversation, Momo eavesdrops from the rooftop. Meanwhile, Yui keeps wondering about her crush for Rito as she goes for a walk. Haruna finds Yui and asks Yui to join her. Haruna takes Yui to the cosplay cafe with Risa and Mio. Risa tells them about the time where she went on a date with Rito. She starts bragging about how she had slept with Rito. Haruna rapidly blushes over Risa's sexual claims, but Yui refutes these statements, explaining that Rito is not like the other boys despite his perverted actions. She knows he does not do them on purpose. As they head home, Yui stops and understands she is shameless herself since she can not stop thinking about being with Rito; she even imagines herself pregnant with Rito's child. At the bridge on the way home, Mikan sees Momo who offers to take her home for the rest of the way. Mikan understood that Momo was eavesdropping on the entire conversation earlier; she does not yell at her though. Momo tells Mikan how she envies her since Rito has been with Mikan much longer than her. Momo remembers how Rito told her Mikan is his "one and only, dear little sister" and how he considers her more than that. Momo also expresses her feelings for Rito to Mikan. Before they could continue, Rito appears running and screaming as he was very concerned about Mikan. Mikan pretends not to care but feels happier on the inside knowing that her brother cares for her.
47	9	"True Self ~True Face in the Darkness~"; Transliteration: "True Self ~Yami no Naka no Sugao~" (Japanese: True Self ～闇の中の素顔～)	December 8, 2012
The episode begins with Rito thanking Rin for taking care of Mikan. Later, due to one of Lala's inventions, Rito and Yami become stuck to each other by the hand, Yami immediately tries to cut Rito's hand but Momo explains the effects will wear out eventually. Yami goes to buy food with Rito and makes it clear she does not want him touching her inappropriately over her food. While she is buying taiyaki, Rito is embarrassed when the seller thinks they are a couple. They sit on a bench where Rito invites Yami over for dinner at his house which she accepts. Back home, Rito helps Yami cook dinner. Nana thinks of feeding Rito because he can only use one hand but quickly blushes and forgets about it. Lala apologizes that her invention caused this mess and Mikan lets Yami stay as long she needs to. Next, Yami has to shower. Nana steps in despite Momo's demands, saying that she prevents Rito from doing anything perverted. In the shower, Rito is blindfolded while Nana washes Yami's back. Everything turns around when Rito's blindfold slips off, resulting in a beating. During bedtime, Yami and Rito must sleep together. As they are alone, Yami tells Rito how she never sleeps anymore and wants to talk about the past with him. While this happens, Oshizu goes for a walk when she encounters Mea. She follows Mea and wants to understand more about Mea. Oshizu leaves her body and enters Mea's mind. She first finds sweets and Rito licking her. As she goes deeper, she sees memories of Mea's past. Mea asked for information about Yami and hears her talking to someone who she calls "Master". Oshizu tries to find out about Master but is suddenly kicked out by Mea herself as she detected Oshizu's presence. The darkness power inside Mea nearly swallows up Oshizu until Oshizu returns to her original body. Mea approached Oshizu and tells her that she could have died if she stayed in there longer. Oshizu, terrified, asks Mea "Who are you".
48	10	"Past ~Memories Leading to Tomorrow~"; Transliteration: "Past ~Asu ni Tsunagaru Kioku~" (Japanese: Past ～明日につながる記憶～)	December 15, 2012
Yami starts telling Rito about her past, explaining how she was created by a woman named Tearju Lunatique using her own cells, therefore Yami is effectively a clone of Tearju and sees her as her mother. However, Tearju was taken away from Yami by the association that had asked to create Yami. They forced Yami to follow the path of darkness and trained her to be a weapon. She doesn't know what happened to Tearju and also notes that the society was destroyed when the Devilukes unified the universe. Rito demands revenge, which confuses Yami given that Rito is her target. Yet somehow, Yami feels safe with Rito as she leans towards him. During the conversation, Momo tries to spy on Yami but is caught by Mikan. Momo convinces Mikan of the necessity to spy on them claiming that Rito may do inappropriate acts with Yami in his sleep. Mikan reluctantly tags along, but stops and grabs Momo's tail, making Momo scream for help. The effects of Lala's invention soon wears off. Rito praises being detached from Yami, but Yami feels insulted and knocks him down. She snuggles close to him for the rest of the night. The next day in school, everyone is Rito's class is surprised to see a new assistant who Rito recognizes as Tearju. While Lala and friends discuss Tearju, Oshizu asks Rito to come with her. Mikado tells Rito she and Oshizu brought Tearju to earth during her investigation. She found a photo of Tearju and was able to trace her whereabouts. Meanwhile, Momo tells Yami to meet Tearju but Yami does not respond. Rito finds Tearju in the hallway and asks her to meet Yami. Tearju hesitates, blaming herself for abandoning Yami. The principal starts chasing after Tearju, making both of them run. Lala finds Rito and Tearju running and offers them help. She teleports them behind the bushes partly naked. Yami, sitting on a nearby bench, knocks out Rito, catching Tearju's attention. Tearju looks at Yami and calls her "Eve".
49	11	"The Right Thing ~What is a Way of Life?~"; Transliteration: "The Right Thing ~Ikikatatte Nani?~" (Japanese: The Right Thing ～生き方って何?～)	December 22, 2012
Tearju tries to talk to Yami and apologizes for abandoning her. She tried to escape with Yami when the organization tried to eliminate her, but the plan was foiled and Yami was taken away. She hid her identity until the organization was destroyed. Yami refuses to let her life as "Golden Darkness" go and walks off making Momo concerned about Yami's honesty. Ryouko finds the situation normal as they have not met each other for a long time. Meanwhile, Nana tells Mea about a new assistant in Lala's class triggering Mea's instincts after the master told her about Tearju being one of their main enemies. Nana questions Mea's reaction and seeks Haruna and Lala for help, thinking Mea is still hiding a secret. They all help cheer Mea up by remodeling her apartment. Haruna picks the design while Lala helps Nana obtain financing from their father. Meanwhile, Momo and Rito ask Tearju about Mea and master. Tearju is unsure but knows that the organization wanted to mass-produce transform weapons. Momo gives Tearju self-defense seeds to protect her from her master. The seeds will trap the enemy and call Momo for help. Afterschool, Mea finds Tearju alone and breaks in wanting to talk to Tearju. Oshizu spots Mea and strips Mea's clothing, warning Tearju that Mea is dangerous based on her previous analysis. However, Mea is not afraid of being stripped and quickly escapes and regenerates her clothes. Tearju trips and activates the seeds, tying Oshizu and her up and calling Momo for help. When Rito and Momo arrive, they see Mea's true identity. Mea only follows orders from Nemesis, her master. Tearju explains that Nemesis was created from a project parallel to Yami and her and was originally frozen. Mea remembers how Nemesis courted her shortly after she was born. Nemesis trained her to become a transform weapon and told her about Yami being her sister. Tearju and Momo convince Mea to change her lifestyle, but Mea leaves with the note that she will remain loyal to her master Nemesis.
50	12	"Room ~A Maiden's Feelings~"; Transliteration: "Room ~Otome no Omoi~" (Japanese: Room ～乙女の想い～)	December 29, 2012
Momo plays through several dating sims and takes notes hoping to aid her harem plan. As Momo completes another pathway, she wonders how she can use these concepts to solve the main issue: Rito. Momo wonders when she fell in love with Rito and remembers how Rito shared many interests with her such as plants. As Momo thinks of Rito more, she slowly starts to fondle her tail until Nana walks in. Momo's romantic fantasies of Rito continue throughout the school. At school, a group of boys who share a love interest with Momo forms a fan club titled "Venus Momo Club". As members, the club will dedicate themselves to helping Momo out. At first, Momo appreciates the help such as accepting all her duties, cleaning her furniture and acting as bodyguards but as time goes on, the club distances Momo from Rito more, making her unable to spend time with Rito. Momo sees Lala spending personal time with Rito and Rito making accidental gestures with other girls, making her feel left out. Momo's depression reaches a critical point and devises a way to spend personal time with Rito. During P.E., Momo cuts class and wanders off. Momo's club waits outside the locker room for Momo and learns about her biggest threat: Rito. Because Rito is frequently discussed by the morals committee and Momo lives with him, Momo will not be safe from Rito. Later, Rito receives a message from Momo to meet her in the storage shed. When Rito enters the storage shed, Momo locks the door and tackles him. She feels aroused over Rito and asks Rito how he feels being alone. Momo deeply caresses him and daydreams of Rito becoming sexually active with her. Momo continues to seduce Rito until Momo's club finds out, thanks to Mea tipping them off. The club attacks Rito for kidnapping Momo, but Momo becomes very angry and forces the club to apologize to Rito. In the end, Momo blames Mea for ruining the moment and wonders how she can win Rito's heart. Rito also cannot understand Momo's true intentions.
