= To Love Ru Darkness 2nd =

- Season 4
- The first Blu-ray and DVD volume compilation cover of To Love Ru Darkness 2nd.
- No. of episodes: 14

Release
- Original network: BS11, Tokyo MX, SUN, AT-X
- Original release: July 7 – October 28, 2015

Season chronology
- ← Previous; Darkness Next → To Love Ru Darkness 2nd

To Love Ru is an anime series based on the manga of the same name written by Saki Hasemi and illustrated by Kentaro Yabuki.

A fourth and final season of the anime series titled, To Love Ru Darkness 2nd, aired in Japan between July 7 and October 29, 2015. The opening theme is "secret arms" by Ray while the ending theme is "Gardens" by Mami Kawada. Sentai Filmworks released To Love Ru Darkness 2nd on DVD and Blu-ray in North America on November 1, 2016.

== Episode list ==
No. overall	No. in season	Title	Original release date
51	1	"Unconsciously ~Light Head☆Beating Heart~"; Transliteration: "Unconsciously: Atama Fuwafuwa☆Kokoro Dokidoki" (Japanese: Unconsciously～頭ふわふわ☆心どきどき～)	July 7, 2015
Rito begins his day with the usual activities: Momo sneaking into his bed, a beating from Nana, and accidental groping with Lala. On the way to school, Rito greets all of his classmates and receives another beating from Yami for running into her. As they prepare for class, Momo reminds Rito of her harem plan. Lala also encourages Haruna to confess to Rito. In the afternoon, Haruna, fresh from tennis practice, finds Nana at school for her remedial classes. They sit together and have a chat; Nana also shares a Deviluke sports drink with Haruna. Momo, waiting for Rito to finish his remedial classes, joins them. She asks Haruna about her progress with Rito in which Haruna admits she needs help. She loves Rito but does not want to jeopardize her friendship with Lala as she loves Rito too. By Earth's tradition, Rito can only marry one woman. Momo tries to convince Haruna that polygamy is common in the universe and that Earth is simply outdated. As Nana argues with Momo about polygamy, Haruna suddenly begins to act strange. Rito arrives and informs Momo and Nana that the Deviluke drink earlier has made Haruna drunk. Momo, attempting to advance her harem plan, asks Rito to escort Haruna home. Rito accepts and avoids detection from the principal. At Haruna's apartment, Haruna, still drunk, seduces Rito and mentions Momo's harem plan. Haruna asks Rito about his feelings for the harem plan but Haruna sobers up. Akiho also arrives home and greets Haruna in an embarrassing situation. Rito quickly leaves. While Akiho continuously apologizes to Haruna, Momo finds Rito and asks him about his day with Haruna. Meanwhile, Mea is asking for Nemesis' whereabouts.
52	2	"Uneasy ~Hesitant Heart~"; Transliteration: "Uneasy: Kokoro no Mayoi" (Japanese: Uneasy～心の迷い～)	July 14, 2015
Rito finds Momo in his bed again. Momo reminds Rito about her harem plan and advises him to be careful of Mea. Meanwhile, Mea is worried that Nemesis is not responding to her as she always relies on her master for directions. She tries to hide her concerns from Nana who is inviting her to a bakery. Elsewhere, Tearju thanks Rito for helping her and asks him if Momo has new information about Mea. Momo is more concerned about Yami skipping classes. Tearju understands Yami's motives about staying away from her and wishes to see her and Mikan, Yami's friend. As Rito thinks about the friendship, Lala bumps into him and accidentally drops an invention. Rito activates it turning him into a mouse. Being small, Rito can easily see a girl's underwear, making him uncomfortable. He desperately searches for Lala but his small size makes him vulnerable to being stepped on. He eventually lands under Yami's clothing. Rito manages to escape with her underwear but passes out. Mea finds Rito and remembers Nemesis's words about weak people being weeded out. She helps Rito anyway and Rito recovers in time for a beating from Yami. As Yami leaves, Mea asks Yami about feelings and how Nemesis never taught her this subject. Yami tells Mea to discover it herself. Afterschool, Rito finds Mea on the roof in her battle clothes and asks about her motives. He tries to convince Mea not to rely solely on her master Nemesis but it enrages her. Mea seduces Rito with her Psycho Dive ability but alien enemies also approach and attack Mea, leading Rito and Mea on a wild rampage. During the fight, Mea realizes that Nemesis is reminding her that she is a weapon. Nana also spots Mea in her weapon form.
53	3	"After a Storm Comes a Calm ~Friends~"; Transliteration: "After a Storm Comes a Calm: Tomodachi" (Japanese: After a Storm Comes a Calm～ともだち～)	July 21, 2015
Nana is heartbroken as she remembers Mea's true form as a weapon. Mea notes that she was following her master's orders to disguise herself as a human. She also requests a breakup of their friendship because weapons and humans can never be together. Later at night, Momo informs Rito that Nana has shut herself in her room. Momo also blames herself for not intervening given that she was already suspicious of Mea. Rito assures Momo by talking to Nana himself. He finds Nana inside a virtual space filled with her animal friends. Nana tells Rito how she wanted to help Mea as Mea was always alone. Despite her efforts, Nana feels that Mea never saw her as a friend and was only playing with her. Rito hugs Nana and assures her that she can still make up. The Psycho Dive ability showed Rito Mea's fears and loneliness of being a weapon. Feeling confident, Nana seeks Mea. As for Mea, she is sitting near a river trying to justify her actions. She reminds herself that she is a weapon and only befriended Nana to bring Yami out. Nana finds Mea and confronts her. Mea fixated on her identity, keeps Nana away by attacking her. Momo tries to intervene but Rito stops her. Nana dodges Mea's attacks until Mea activates her Psycho Dive. With the ability, Mea finds out that Nana consulted with Rito. Mea tries to explain to Nana in detail why they cannot be together but Nana refutes, stating that regardless of her identity, only the feelings matter. Mea is unsure about Nana's words but accepts her request to be friends again. Yami, who happened to be dealing with the alien assassins targeting Mea, arrives. Mea thanks Yami and admits she partially understands Yami's words on emotions and feelings. At night, Nana can't sleep and she remembers how warm Rito's hug was and decides to sneak into bed with him, but as usual, Momo was already there and Rito gets beat up by Nana.
54	4	"Summer festival ~Beginning of the Festival~"; Transliteration: "Summer Festival: Matsuri no Hajimari" (Japanese: Summer festival～祭りの始まり～)	July 28, 2015
Mikan invites Yami to the festival in which Yami accepts. At the festival, Rito follows Momo and Nana. Nana is uncomfortable with Rito looking at her cotton candy and gives him a bite. Momo notes that Nana is conscious of Rito after the incident with Mea. Rito also notes how Mikan is helping Tearju with understanding and reuniting with Yami. With spare time before the fireworks viewing, Momo asks to spend time alone with Rito. Rito spots a kid with her mother and asks Momo about her mother. Momo replies that her mother is usually away with political work; however, Momo enjoys being with her sisters and Rito. She then admits that she loves Rito and wants to be with him but covers up before Rito hears her. Mikan suddenly appears and asks Rito and Momo for help. As they run, Rito bumps into Yami who attempts to attack him. Mikan asks Yami why she hasn't killed Rito and reveals that she is actually Nemesis, Mea's master. Nemesis materialized to ease everyone's suspicions about her. Rito makes gestures at Nemesis which interests her. She enjoys Rito's gestures and considers using them to her advantage. Yami then asks Nemesis about making her a weapon. Nemesis replies that despite Yami's peaceful life, her inevitable true form as a weapon named Darkness will surface. At the fireworks viewing, Rito and Momo share their thoughts on Nemesis with Tearju and Mikado. Mikado is surprised that Nemesis exists while Tearju remains suspicious about Nemesis. Mea notes that Nemesis wants her to experience life on Earth to understand Yami better. Momo then asks Tearju about Darkness but Tearju is unable to respond. However, Tearju assures that with everyone present, Yami should be fine.
55	5	"New Move ~Two of a Kind?~"; Transliteration: "New Move: Nitamono Doushi?" (Japanese: New move～似たものどうし？～)	August 4, 2015
Rito tries to take one of Lala's inventions from Celine but Celine activates it and summons a naked Yui for Rito. The next day, Rito catches a train and finds Yui inside with an angry glare. She pulls Rito to a side protecting him from other women. Rito tries to talk to Yui by asking why she is here. Yui was delivering papers while Rito was shopping for novelty items. The train then becomes more crowded, squeezing Rito and Yui together and forcing Rito to grab Yui in weird places. One of Rito's items also molests Yui. At arrival, Rito finds one of his items running, angering Yui. Meanwhile, Mea asks Nemesis for feedback about her experience on Earth. Nemesis finds it too peaceful and is waiting for the Darkness form to activate. Mea then questions Nemesis about the Darkness form inside Yami but Nemesis declines to explain and assures Mea that time will come, making Mea upset. As for Yami, Mikan tells Yami not to be swayed by Nemesis. She also requests Yami to always seek her for help. On the way home, Mikan spots Mea while grocery shopping and finds her basket filled with sweets. She advises Mea to have a better diet and invites Mea for dinner. Mikan also hopes to learn more about Mea given that she is Yami's sister. At home, while Lala washes up Celine and gets her breasts sucked on, Mea asks to watch Mikan cook. Mea takes interest in cutting vegetables and volunteers. Mikan teaches Mea and remembers the same experience Yami had. When it is Mea's turn to cut, she feels a cutting sensation and cuts the vegetables wildly with her abilities, ripping everyone's clothes in the process. She stops just when Lala arrives. After Mea leaves, Mikan is skeptical whether she can befriend Mea like Yami
56	6	"Manservant ~Competition~"; Transliteration: "Manservant: Soudatsu-sen" (Japanese: Manservant～争奪戦～)	August 11, 2015
Rito, Mikan, and Momo are helping out with Saibai at his studio. As they leave, Saibai asks Mikan to stay behind and cook them dinner. Mikan is concerned about leaving Momo with Rito but endures it. On the way home, Momo hopes to seduce Rito with her visual novels but is stopped by Nemesis who is looking for entertainment by making Rito her servant. Rito agrees hoping to learn more about Nemesis and much to Momo's disappointment. Nemesis challenges Rito to many games and has him feed her, making Momo jealous. Nemesis soon understands the environment around Yami and Mea and compares herself to both of them. Rito tries to ask Nemesis more about Darkness, but Nemesis gives a vague response that Darkness will bring chaos, angering Momo. Later, Mikan rushes home fearing Momo; instead, she finds everyone enjoying dinner cooked by Momo. Momo then tries to sneak into Rito's bath but finds Nemesis already inside. Nemesis used her transformability to seduce Rito and wants to take Rito from Momo. Momo tries to fight back but Nemesis uses her trump card by calling Mikan with Rito's voice. Mikan arrives and finds Momo with an unconscious Rito, resulting in a big scolding for Momo. The next day, Mikan, preventing Momo from bathing with Rito, sneaks into Rito's bath first. Rito is suspicious of Mikan and questions her. Mikan replies that the situation is normal because they're siblings. As they share the bathtub, Mikan asks Rito about his progress with other girls. Rito gives a lackluster reply. Mikan then mentions the harem making Rito panic and rise. He accidentally exposes his private parts to Mikan and escapes from the bath, bumping into Momo who is eavesdropping. Rito suspects that it was Momo's plan to get Mikan to take a bath with him.
57	7	"Resistance ~I Know, But Still~"; Transliteration: "Resistance: Wakatteiru Kedo" (Japanese: Resistance 〜わかっているけど〜)	August 25, 2015
Thanks to Lala's massage tool, Honekawa feels better and resumes his teaching duties. Tearju is reassigned to teach the class that Momo, Nana, and Mea are enrolled in. As she begins class, she feels depressed as she sees the empty desk. During a break, Momo confirms to Rito that Tearju is her new teacher. Momo wants to reunite Yami with her and tried to invite Yami back to class; Yami denied it. Rito chooses to talk to Yami himself. As he looks for Yami, Mea finds him. Mea is interested in his bathing experience with Nemesis and uses her Psycho Dive to recreate it. When Rito mentions Yami, Mea reads Rito's recent thoughts and backs away, feeling anger with Tearju. Rito tells Mea to reconcile with Tearju but Mea leaves. As for Yami, she invites Mikan to the library with her. At the library, Mikan is impressed with the breadth of Yami's reading and tells Yami about her past from Tearju. Mikan also invites Yami back to school but memories of Nemesis float into Yami's mind, making her feel uneasy. The next day, Rito finds Yami in the library and asks Yami to return to school. He also mentions Tearju's thoughts of them being a family but Yami refuses to accept because of her identity as a weapon. Yami also tells Rito to stay away from her family business but is confronted by Mea, a member of her family. Mea relates Yami's thought of how she always followed orders from Nemesis. After the fight with Nana, Mea learns that she can follow her own path. Per Rito, she tells Yami to reconcile with Tearju. Although the meeting is interrupted by a dog interfering with the eavesdroppers Oshizu and Momo, Yami accepts Mea's words and shows up in Tearju's class the next day in her school uniform. She thanks Mea as she takes her seat.
58	8	"Danger ~Danger~"; Transliteration: "Danger: Ki Ken" (Japanese: Danger 〜危・剣〜)	September 1, 2015
Zastin tells a story about a cursed sword that turns its wielder into a killer seeking blood. Next, Mikan receives a call from Rin inviting her over to Saki's place. All of Saki's servants are sick from her dinner and Rin needs people to fill in. Mikan has to cook for Saibai and Zastin and sends Rito instead, making Saki angry. Momo, Nana, Yami, and Mea volunteer too. Rito quickly makes a negative impression by falling on top of Saki. During work, Mea talks about keeping her identity a secret while Momo observes Rito's interactions with Rin. Rito spots a shipment from Saki's father and offers to store it; Rin replies to leave it alone. Rito then comments about Rin's maid outfit leading to another incident; Rin sends Rito to the library. She later opens the shipment finding a red and purple sword. In the library, Momo asks Rito about Rin, but Rin breaks in with the red and purple sword asking for blood. Everyone notices Rin's chants and suspect that the sword is the cursed sword from Zastin's story. Yami notes that the sword is not cursed but a living weapon named "Bladix". Bladix uses its wielder to obtain his energy from blood. Yami, unable to free the sword, tries to destroy it but Mea stops her. Bladix is fused with Rin and if Yami destroyed it, Rin's mind would corrupt permanently. Rito then asks Mea to let him enter Rin's mind with Psycho Dive despite the risks; Mea accepts. Inside Rin, Bladix tries to control Rito. He succeeds but Rito shares his feelings of protecting family members to Rin's mind, allowing Rin and him to escape. After Mea forcefully frees Bladix from Rin, he searches for a new mind only to be defeated by Yami. Zastin, having received an emergency call earlier about the sword, arrives too late to help.
59	9	"Kiss ~What Lies Beyond a Kiss~"; Transliteration: "Kiss: Kiss no Saki ni Aru Mono" (Japanese: Kiss 〜キスの先にあるもの〜)	September 8, 2015
Rin thanks Rito for saving her from Bladix despite Rito claiming that Yami was the one who saved her. Meanwhile, Lala is concerned with Haruna's progress with Rito. Peke understands Lala but is more worried about her fading relationship with Rito. Peke advises Lala to work on her relationship first. Lala proceeds and finds Rito being punished by Yami for groping Tearju. Lala asks Yami to forgive him in which she does, but Rito resumes his duty before Lala can speak to him. Momo also finds Nana lurking near Rito's classroom; Nana lies that she got lost and ended up here. As Nana leaves, Momo is happy but jealous that Rito notices Nana more than her. She then finds Lala consulting with Peke about Rito and joins in. Momo, knowing that Lala must be the wife for her harem plan to succeed, pushes Lala to advance her romance. On the way home, Momo observes Lala clinging onto Rito and finds it ineffective. She invites Lala to her room and teaches human love through her visual novel. Lala then teleports to Rito's bath and observes his manly body. Rito tries to escape, but Lala stops him and asks for a kiss as a sign of love. She tries to kiss Rito, but Rito slips and passes out underneath Lala. Later, Momo apologizes to Rito that she was behind all this. She showed Lala kissing and mentioned that it was the universal sign of love. Nana also finds Lala practicing kissing Rito on her doll and talks to her. The next day, Rito finds Lala and explains to her that he can't kiss her because their love has not advanced to that point. From her discussion with Nana, Lala accepts Rito's feelings and kisses him on the cheek, showing her feelings toward him. She hopes Rito can answer it someday. Momo, seeking help, decides to cooperate with Nana.
60	10	"True Character ~Identity Revealed!?~"; Transliteration: "True Character: Shoutai Bareta!?" (Japanese: True Character 〜正体バレた！？〜)	September 15, 2015
Momo shares her secret harem plan with Nana. Nana, outraged, emphasizes that Rito already has Lala. However, Momo loves Rito too and the harem plan is the best solution. Nana walks down the hallway as she thinks about Momo's question regarding her feelings for Rito. Mea finds Nana depressed and talks to her. She knows about Momo's harem plan through Rito and finds it exciting. She shows Nana the benefits of her Psycho Dive but Nana stops it and questions her use of it at school. Mea doesn't mind since no one notices. Later, Nana finds Celine riding a vacuum robot made by Lala. Rito explains to Nana what happened earlier but Nana interrupts it with her firm disapproval of the harem plan. Meanwhile, Oshizu has been spying on Mea since morning and wonders if she can befriend her. As she approaches Mea, Mea teases Oshizu by disguising as Tearju and surprising her with a dog puppet, scaring Oshizu into releasing telekinetic powers. Oshizu then quits but Mea notes that she is one of the few people who knows her secret. Oshizu convinces Mea to stop hiding but Mea doesn't feel comfortable doing so. Suddenly, the vacuum robot goes berserk thanks to Oshizu's powers and sucks clothes everywhere it goes. Nana and Rito try to stop it as it zips through school. Oshizu asks Mea for help, but Mea fears revealing her identity and does nothing. In the end, Nana breaks the robot, unleashing a black hole. Oshizu tries to eradicate the black hole despite knowing that her lifespan will shorten from using too much power. However, Mea later admits blame for starting the mess and assists by using her charged shot. She ends up revealing her true identity but everyone applauds her instead. Yami also reveals that Mea is her little sister.
61	11	"The Beginning of Darkness ~That Time~"; Transliteration: "The Beginning of Darkness: Sono Toki" (Japanese: The Beginning of Darkness 〜その時〜)	September 22, 2015
Yami wakes up to Luna the AI who asks about her change of heart. Yami replies that it's due to life at Sainan. Rito also wakes up to Momo. Momo is curious to see Rito's development towards her harem plan. She confirms that Rito is the perfect centerpiece because many girls have fallen for him. She also notes that Yami has gotten softer towards him. Rito questions Momo's theory as he sees Yami uneasy with Tearju. Momo and Rito then ask Ryouko about Yami. Ryouko notes that Yami cannot recall memories of her first visit to her office. Momo remembers Nemesis talking about Yami being unaware of her Darkness ability. Later, while Momo thinks about her harem plan, Rito speaks to Yami about problems with Tearju and hiding her past. Yami questions Rito's interest and tells him to back off. The meeting ends when he accidentally falls onto Yami and gets unwanted attention. Later at the pool, while students examine Tearju's revealing swimsuit, Mea talks to Yami as sisters. Yami thanks Mea for inspiring her to start a new peaceful life on Earth. As Mea and Tearju agree, Yami feels a jolt as her body glows. Suddenly, Yami's transformation goes berserk. Mea is confused until Nemesis tells her that Yami is transforming into her true form: Darkness. Nemesis also possesses Mea and locks her away ensuring the inevitable rampage and their future as assassins. Tearju, shocked, confronts Nemesis regarding Yami. Nemesis answers that Yami was created to fight and cause destruction. Admitting peace triggers this backup mode to protect Yami's identity as a weapon. Nana also demands Nemesis to return Mea's body but Nemesis lies that Mea has always been a false personality of her. Once the transformation is complete, Nemesis greets Darkness.
62	12	"Prediction is Impossible ~Rampaging Darkness~"; Transliteration: "Prediction is Impossible: Bousou Suru Yami" (Japanese: Prediction is Impossible 〜暴走する闇〜)	September 29, 2015
Darkness seeks someone to do ecchi things with. The principal offers himself but Darkness sends him to Antarctica. She pulls her true target, Rito, out of class, and plunges him into the swimming pool. She manipulates the pool's water to grope everyone including Tearju, setting up a place to kill Rito. Darkness enjoys Rito's gestures and plans to inherit his techniques by swallowing him. Momo and Nana intervene, but Darkness creates clones of Rito who molest them. They respond by making everyone, including Rito, evacuate. Darkness then recalls how she first awakened when she lost Tearju. She attacked the organization, split Planet Kild in half, and ended up battered in front of Ryouko. Nemesis is satisfied with Darkness until she mentions her desire to toy with Rito because of his mastery with molestation. Meanwhile, in class, Yui tries to silence everyone about Rito's kidnapping but Lala chooses to investigate, sensing serious danger. Yui and Haruna later investigate on their own with Yui suspecting that Lala's inventions are causing it. They bump into Rito and Darkness in whom the latter demonstrates her wormhole ability by indirectly groping Haruna and Yui. When Darkness prepares to fatally attack Rito, Lala arrives. Darkness also sends Momo and Nana to Mea's apartment. Nana observes the room and confirms that Nemesis is lying about Mea. As for Mea, she orders Nemesis to return her body but Nemesis refuses to state that they were born to coexist. Nemesis promises Mea to return her body after Darkness kills Rito but Mea objects. Mea also has friends and no longer needs to rely on Nemesis. Like Ren and Run, people can separate from adulthood. Nemesis refuses and restrains Mea more until Oshizu, summoned by Mea, performs an exorcism.
63	13	"Power and power ~Protector and the Protected~"; Transliteration: "Pawā ando power 〜Mamoru Mono to Mamora reru Mono〜" (Japanese: Power and power 〜守るものと守られるもの〜)	October 28, 2015
Nana and Momo return to school and arrive just when Oshizu completes her exorcism. As Nana and Mea reconcile, Nemesis materializes, applauding Mea for her strategy. Momo is curious about Nemesis's form and analyzes it until Nana calls everyone to help Lala. Mea defies Nemesis orders and joins in. Meanwhile, Darkness attacks Lala with a large clone of Rito. Lala dodges and destroys it much to Darkness's surprise. As they fight, Momo, Nana, and Mea meet up with bystanders Yui and Haruna. Mea reassures everyone noting that Yami is currently experiencing a nightmare. Suddenly, Darkness destroys Lala's sword and attacks her with molestation. Lala counters by using her inventions to take Rito. Lala asks Rito to stay with her as she deflects Darkness's pillar of light attack with her tail beam. The pillar knocks Lala and Rito to Haruna's apartment, but Lala manages to destroy it. However, as a consequence of using so much power, Lala shrinks into a little child like her father. Darkness mocks the Deviluke's and tries to continue fighting until Zastin and his bodyguards arrive. They attempt to eliminate Darkness but Momo and Nana arrive, restraining Zastin. Mea also arrives and confronts Darkness ensuring another fight. As they fight, Mea confirms flaws with Darkness: There are too little power output and too much emphasis on Rito's perversion, indicating an incomplete transformation and that Yami is still conscious. Because Rito is responsible for the flaw, Momo and Nana demand Rito think of a strategy to attack Darkness. Rito's actions will expand the flaw and crash the transformation. Mea buys time by letting Darkness attack her and waste her powers. After Darkness ties Mea on a beanstalk, Rito arrives with his plan: molest Darkness on his own will.
64	14	"Bright future ~Thank You~"; Transliteration: "Bright future 〜Arigatō〜" (Japanese: Bright future 〜ありがとう〜)	October 28, 2015
Haruna and Yui discuss the events with Ryouko. Tearju is also concerned that Darkness could destroy the town but Haruna reassures Tearju that Rito will save Yami. On the beanstalk, Mea, Momo, and Nana prepare for Rito's plan. By molesting Darkness on his own will, Darkness will mentally break down, crashing the transformation. At first, Darkness interprets Rito's plan as another accidental gesture, but when Rito lands in front of Darkness, he mimics the principal and thoroughly molests Darkness. Darkness becomes confused and goes berserk causing her transformation to wear off. One of Darkness's feathers sticks to Mea allowing her to see how Rito implanted that 'bug' on Yami. Rito continues to molest until he gets slapped with the "I hate ecchi" quote, indicating that Yami has awakened. Momo and Nana thank Rito while Mea welcomes Yami back. The next day, life returns to normal except for Lala who is still shrunk. At school, Yami apologizes to everyone about the incident; she also gives Lala a large supply of milk as an apology for making her shrink. Lala assures Yami that she will recover soon unlike Gid. However, Yami falls short of apologizing to Rito. The following night, Yami visits Tearju and Ryouko while Rito escapes from Zastin's curiosity over his method to defeat Darkness. As they both meet, Yami thanks Rito and was about to confess to him about her feelings but is interrupted by Rito's loud apology for molesting her. Yami stuffs him with Taiyaki leading to another incident. Yami denounces her ecchi while helping him get a drink, leaving Mea curious about Yami's heart. Nemesis is also disappointed as she hoped for the return of the Galactic Wars and their future as weapons. Mea invites Nemesis to the peaceful world but Nemesis instead will continue to observe from the shadows. Rito gets late for home and searches for Yami, who hides from him. Momo sees Principal frozen in ice on TV as a discovered yeti.
