= Feel (animation studio) =

Japanese animation studio

Feel, Inc.
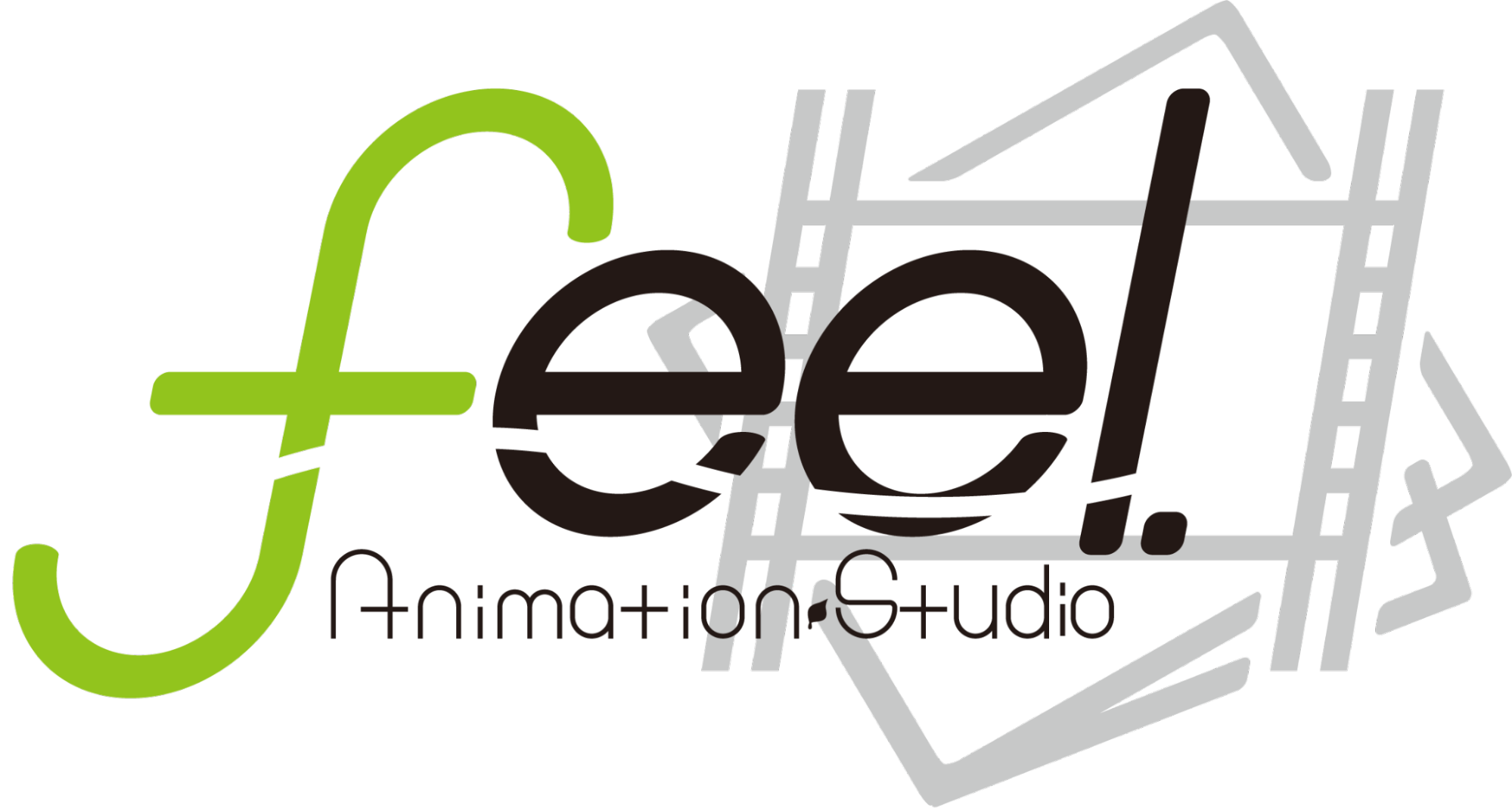
- Native name: 有限会社フィール
- Romanized name: Yūgen-gaisha Fiiru
- Type: Yūgen gaisha
- Industry: Japanese animation
- Founded: December 26, 2002; 23 years ago
- Founder: Makoto Takigasaki
- Headquarters: Koganei, Tokyo, Japan
- Key people: Makoto Takigasaki
- Total equity: ¥ 3,000,000
- Number of employees: 61
- Website: www.feel-ing.com

Feel, Inc. (有限会社フィール, Yūgen-gaisha Fiiru; stylized as feel.) is a Japanese animation studio founded in 2002. The studio is a subsidiary of Fun-Media, a Holdings company, who also owns animation studios Assez Finaud Fabric and Zexcs, which are also located in the same building as Feel.

== History ==
Feel was established in Koganei, Tokyo on December 26, 2002, by ex-Studio Pierrot staff that specializes in the production of anime. To date, the studio have presented various well-known works, including Kissxsis, Outbreak Company, My Teen Romantic Comedy SNAFU seasons 2 and 3, Dagashi Kashi, Tsuki ga Kirei, and Hinamatsuri.

== Productions ==
=== Television series ===
Title	Director	First run start date	First run end date	Eps	Note(s)	Ref(s)
Jinki: Extend	Masahiko Murata	January 6, 2005	March 24, 2005	12	Adaptation of a manga series written by Tunasima Sirou.	
Futakoi Alternative	Takayuki Hirao	April 7, 2005	June 27, 2005	13	Original work. Co-animated with Studio Flag and Ufotable.	
Da Capo: Second Season	Munenori Nawa	July 2, 2005	December 24, 2005	26	Sequel to Da Capo.	
Otoboku: Maidens Are Falling For Me!	Munenori Nawa	October 8, 2006	December 24, 2006	12	Based on an adult visual novel by Caramel Box.	
Nagasarete Airantō	Hideki Okamoto	April 5, 2007	September 27, 2007	26	Adaptation of a manga series written by Takeshi Fujishiro.	
Da Capo II	Hideki Okamoto	October 1, 2007	June 28, 2008	26	Based on an adult visual novel by Circus. Sequel to the Da Capo series.	
Corpse Princess: Aka	Masahiko Murata	October 2, 2008	December 25, 2008	13	Adaptation of a manga series written by Yoshiichi Akahito. Co-animated with Gainax.	
Corpse Princess: Kuro	Masahiko Murata	January 1, 2009	March 26, 2009	12	Sequel to Corpse Princess. Co-animated with Gainax.	
Kanamemo	Shigehito Takayanagi	July 5, 2009	September 27, 2009	13	Adaptation of a manga series written by Shoko Iwami.	
Kissxsis	Munenori Nawa	April 4, 2010	June 21, 2010	12	Adaptation of a manga series written by Bow Ditama.	
Yosuga no Sora	Takeo Takahashi	October 4, 2010	December 20, 2010	12	Based on an adult visual novel by Sphere.	
Fortune Arterial: Akai Yakusoku	Munenori Nawa	October 9, 2010	December 25, 2010	12	Based on an adult visual novel by August. Co-animated with Zexcs.	
Mayo Chiki!	Keiichiro Kawaguchi	July 7, 2011	September 29, 2011	13	Adaptation of a light novel series written by Hajime Asano.	
Listen to Me, Girls. I Am Your Father!	Itsuro Kawasaki	January 11, 2012	March 27, 2012	12	Adaptation of a light novel series written by Tomohiro Matsu.	
So, I Can't Play H!	Takeo Takahashi	July 6, 2012	September 25, 2012	12	Adaptation of a light novel series written by Pan Tachibana.	
Minami-ke: Tadaima	Keiichiro Kawaguchi	January 6, 2013	March 30, 2013	13	The fourth season of Minami-ke.	
A Simple Thinking About Blood Type	Yoshihasa Ōyama	April 7, 2013	March 29, 2016	49	Adaptation of a webtoon written by Real Crazy Man. Co-animated with Assez Finaud Fabric (all seasons) and Zexcs (seasons 3–4).	
Outbreak Company	Kei Oikawa	October 3, 2013	December 19, 2013	12	Adaptation of a light novel series written by Ichirō Sakaki.	
Locodol	Munenori Nawa	July 4, 2014	September 18, 2014	12	Adaptation of a manga series written by Kōtarō Kosugi.	
Jinsei	Keiichiro Kawaguchi	July 6, 2014	September 28, 2014	13	Adaptation of a light novel series written by Ougyo Kawagishi.	
In Search of the Lost Future	Naoto Hosoda	October 4, 2014	December 20, 2014	12	Based on an adult visual novel by Trumple.	
My Teen Romantic Comedy SNAFU Too!	Kei Oikawa	April 3, 2015	June 26, 2015	13	Sequel to My Teen Romantic Comedy SNAFU by Brain's Base.	
Bikini Warriors	Naoyuki Kuzuya	July 7, 2015	September 22, 2015	12	Animation of a Japanese media franchise created by Hobby Japan. Co-animated with PRA.	
Suzakinishi the Animation	Yoshihiro Hiramine	July 8, 2015	September 23, 2015	12	Based on the anime radio program SuzakiNishi by Aya Suzaki and Asuka Nishi.	
Makura no Danshi	Sayo Aoi	July 13, 2015	September 28, 2015	12	Original work. Co-animated with Assez Finaud Fabric.	
Dagashi Kashi	Shigehito Takayanagi	January 7, 2016	March 31, 2016	12	Adaptation of a manga series written by Kotoyama.	
Please Tell Me! Galko-chan	Keiichiro Kawaguchi	January 8, 2016	March 25, 2016	12	Adaptation of a manga series written by Kenya Suzuki.	
This Art Club Has a Problem!	Kei Oikawa	July 7, 2016	September 22, 2016	12	Adaptation of a manga series written by Imigimuru.	
Tsuki ga Kirei	Seiji Kishi	April 6, 2017	June 29, 2017	12	Original work.	
Hinamatsuri	Kei Oikawa	April 6, 2018	June 22, 2018	12	Adaptation of a manga series written by Masao Ōtake.	
Island	Keiichiro Kawaguchi	July 1, 2018	September 16, 2018	12	Based on an all-ages visual novel by Frontwing.	
YU-NO: A Girl Who Chants Love at the Bound of this World	Tetsuo Hirakawa	April 2, 2019	October 1, 2019	26	Based on the adult visual novel remake of YU-NO by 5pb. Originally created by ELF Corporation.	
My Teen Romantic Comedy SNAFU Climax	Kei Oikawa	July 9, 2020	September 24, 2020	12	Sequel to My Teen Romantic Comedy SNAFU TOO!.	
Dropout Idol Fruit Tart	Keiichiro Kawaguchi	October 12, 2020	December 28, 2020	12	Adaptation of a manga series written by Sō Hamayumiba.	
Remake Our Life!	Tomoki Kobayashi	July 3, 2021	September 25, 2021	12	Adaptation of a light novel series written by Nachi Kio.	
The Yakuza's Guide to Babysitting	Itsuro Kawasaki	July 7, 2022	September 22, 2022	12	Adaptation of a manga series written by Tsukiya. Co-animated with Gaina.	
Spy Classroom	Keiichiro Kawaguchi	January 5, 2023	September 28, 2023	24	Adaptation of a light novel series written by Takemachi.	
Summer Pockets	Tomoki Kobayashi	April 7, 2025	September 29, 2025	26	Based on an all-ages visual novel by Key.	
Chitose Is in the Ramune Bottle	Yūji Tokuno	October 7, 2025	TBA	TBA	Adaptation of a light novel series written by Hiromu.	
Li'l Miss Vampire Can't Suck Right	Sayaka Yamai	October 12, 2025	December 28, 2025	12	Adaptation of a manga series written by Kyōsuke Nishiki.	
Noa-senpai wa Tomodachi	Shinsuke Yanagi	2027	TBA	TBA	Adaptation of a manga series written by Enma Akiyama.	

=== Original video animations ===
Title	Director	Release date	Eps	Note(s)	Ref(s)
Strait Jacket	Shinji Ushiro	November 26, 2007– April 28, 2008	3	Adaptation of a light novel series written by Ichirō Sakaki.	
Kissxsis	Munenori Nawa	December 22, 2008– April 6, 2015	12	Adaptation of a manga series written by Bow Ditama.	
Fortune Arterial: Akai Yakusoku	Munenori Nawa	February 23, 2011	1	OVA episode for Fortune Arterial: Akai Yakusoku. Co-animated with Zexcs.	
Listen to Me, Girls. I Am Your Father!	Itsuro Kawasaki	July 11, 2012– March 25, 2015	3	OVAs bundled with the 13th and 18th light novel volumes.	
Minami-ke: Omatase	Keiichiro Kawaguchi	October 5, 2012	1	OVA bundled with the 10th manga volume.	
So, I Can't Play H!	Yoshifumi Sueda	March 27, 2013	1	OVA episode for So, I Can't Play H!	
Minami-ke: Natsuyasumi	Keiichiro Kawaguchi	August 6, 2013	1	OVA bundled with the 11th manga volume.	
Locodol	Munenori Nawa	September 24, 2014– June 22, 2016	3	OVA episodes for Locodol.	
My Teen Romantic Comedy SNAFU TOO!	Kei Oikawa	October 27, 2016	1	Based on Volume 10.5 of My Teen Romantic Comedy SNAFU.	
Bikini Warriors	Naoyuki Kuzuya	December 7, 2016– July 28, 2018	5	OVA episodes for Bikini Warriors. Co-animated with PRA.	
Please Tell Me! Galko-chan	Keiichiro Kawaguchi	January 23, 2017	1	OVA bundled with the 4th manga volume.	

=== Original net animation ===
Title	Director	Release date	Eps	Note(s)	Ref
Augmented Reality Girls Trinary	Itsuro Kawasaki	April 12, 2017– November 29, 2017	34	Linkage with games. Consists of 6 Acts. Produced by Toei Animation.	
