= Shinkyoku Sōkai Polyphonica =

Video game

- Visual novel cover

神曲奏界ポリフォニカ
- Genre: Adventure, fantasy, romance
- Video game
- Developer: Ocelot
- Publisher: Ocelot (Windows); Prototype (PS2, PSP)
- Genre: Visual novel
- Platform: Windows, PlayStation 2, PlayStation Portable
- Released: Windows; April 28, 2006 (Episodes 1&2); May 25, 2007 (Episodes 3&4); PlayStation 2 April 26, 2007 (Episodes 1&2); December 27, 2007 (Episodes 3&4); April 10, 2008 (Episodes 0-4 Full Pack); PlayStation Portable; June 26, 2008 (Episodes 0-4 Full Pack)
- Video game

Shinkyoku Sōkai Polyphonica THE BLACK
- Developer: Ocelot; KuroCo
- Publisher: Ocelot (Windows); Prototype (PS2)
- Genre: Visual novel
- Platform: Windows, PlayStation 2
- Released: June 29, 2007 (Windows); January 15, 2009 (PS2)
- Video game

Shinkyoku Sōkai Polyphonica Memories White
- Developer: Ocelot; AMEDEO
- Publisher: Ocelot
- Genre: Visual novel
- Platform: Windows
- Released: June 29, 2007 (First Emotion); July 13, 2007 (Endless Aria)
- Light novel
- Written by: Ichirō Sakaki (Crimson); Junichi Ōsako (Black); Madoka Takadono (White); Toshihiko Tsukiji (Blue)
- Published by: Softbank Creative
- Imprint: GA Bunko
- Original run: January 16, 2006 – April 15, 2014
- Volumes: 12 (Crimson); 6 (Crimson S); 3 (After School); 14 (Black); 3 (Leon); 1 (Gold); 13 (White); 3 (Blue); 3 (Dan Sariel); 4 (Eiphonic Songbird); 3 (Short stories and anthology)
- Manga

Cardinal Crimson
- Written by: Ichirō Sakaki
- Illustrated by: Tomo Hirokawa
- Published by: FlexComix
- English publisher: CMX Manga
- Magazine: FlexComix Blood
- Original run: March 1, 2007 – 2012
- Volumes: 9
- Anime television series
- Directed by: Masami Shimoda; Junichi Watanabe (Note: Watanabe passed away in January of 2001. Albeit initially credited on the series' website as the chief director (チーフディレクター), Watanabe's credit was later removed on both the website and the series' opening credits.)
- Produced by: Gō Tanaka; Kazuyoshi Fukuba; Michiyoshi Koyama; Yūichi Matsunaga; Yoshiko Nakayama; Toshiyuki Satō
- Written by: Ichirō Sasaki
- Music by: Hikaru Nanase
- Studio: Ginga-ya
- Licensed by: NA: Sentai Filmworks
- Original network: CBC, MBS, TBS
- English network: NA: Anime Network
- Original run: April 3, 2007 – June 19, 2007
- Episodes: 12
- Anime television series

Polyphonica: Crimson S
- Directed by: Toshimasa Suzuki
- Produced by: Yoshiko Nakayama; Tetsurō Satomi; Yui Shibata; Masashi Takatori; Yoshiyuki Itō; Kunihiro Kitamura
- Written by: Kenichi Kanemaki
- Music by: Hikaru Nanase
- Studio: Diomedéa
- Licensed by: NA: Maiden Japan
- Original network: AT-X, MBS
- English network: NA: Anime Network
- Original run: April 4, 2009 – June 20, 2009
- Episodes: 12
- Video game

Shinkyoku Sōkai Polyphonica: After School
- Developer: Ocelot
- Publisher: Ocelot (Windows); Prototype (PS2, PSP)
- Genre: Visual novel
- Platform: Windows, PlayStation 2, PlayStation Portable
- Released: December 25, 2009 (Windows); November 11, 2010 (PS2); February 17, 2011 (PSP)
- Video game

Shinkyoku Sōkai Polyphonica Plus
- Developer: Ocelot
- Publisher: Ocelot
- Genre: Visual novel
- Platform: Windows
- Released: July 22, 2011

Shinkyoku Sōkai Polyphonica (神曲奏界ポリフォニカ), also known as simply Polyphonica, is a Japanese all-age visual novel created by Ocelot and first released for Windows on April 28, 2006. Aside from the game, multiple series of light novels have been created, and a manga adaptation started in March 2007. An anime adaptation that aired in Japan between April and June 2007. Another anime adaption aired from April to June 2009, and was a prequel of the events in the first anime.

The original game, the Crimson series, will start its second installment, covering the third and fourth story. The Black and White Polyphonica series were adapted from a printed novel to visual novel media in spring 2007, respectively titled Shinkyoku Sōkai Polyphonica THE BLACK and Shinkyoku Sōkai Polyphonica Memories White.

== Plot ==
In the continent of Polyphonica, spirits materialize in the world, surviving on the music that is played by humans, and live together with them. While the spirits do not appear often, some spirits have enough power to materialize in human or animal forms. Musicians called Dantists (神曲楽士, Shinkyoku Gakushi) play Divine Songs (神曲, Shinkyoku; also "Commandia") using special instruments called One-Man Orchestra (単身楽団, Tanshin Gakudan) which enable the spirits they have partnered with to manifest their true powers. The Crimson series follows the adventures of a Dantist named Tatara Phoron and his contract spirit Coathicarte Apa Lagranges (Coatie). In the video game, the player plays Phoron as a student at Torvas Divine Song Players Academy (トルバス神曲学院, Torubasu Shinkyoku Gakuin). In the first Polyphonica anime television series, he and his friends work together at Office Tsuge Divine Song Players Management Group (ツゲ神曲楽士派遣事務所, Tsuge Shinkyoku Gakushi Haken Jimusho). The second television series, Polyphonica Crimson S, takes place when they are still in school.

== Release history ==
There have been five Shinkyoku Sōkai Polyphonica visual novels released, with three different series.

Polyphonica Crimson series

- Shinkyoku Sōkai Polyphonica ~Episode 1&2 Box Edition~ – April 28, 2006
- Shinkyoku Sōkai Polyphonica ~Episode 3&4 Box Edition~ – May 25, 2007

Polyphonica Black series

- Shinkyoku Sōkai Polyphonica THE BLACK ~Episode 1&2 Box Edition~ – August 10, 2007

Polyphonica White series

- Shinkyoku Sōkai Polyphonica Memories White ~First Emotion~ – June 29, 2007
- Shinkyoku Sōkai Polyphonica Memories White ~Endless Aria~ – July 13, 2007

== Adaptations ==
=== Light novels ===
After the game, the Polyphonica series expanded into a light novel series. The stories are loosely connected in a shared universe setting. The novels are published by GA Bunko, a division of Softbank Creative. Some of the series are identified with colors. The Black series happens in the same timeline as the Crimson series, which follows the main characters of the game. The White series appears to take place in the distant past.

Polyphonica Crimson series
Story: Ichirō Sakaki / Illustrations: Noboru Kannatsuki
1. Wayward Crimson - January 15, 2006
2. Romantic Crimson - May 15, 2006
3. Spurting Crimson - September 15, 2006
4. Struggle Crimson - October 15, 2006
5. Beginning Crimson - May 15, 2007
6. Jealous Crimson - July 15, 2008
7. Aiding Crimson - September 15, 2008
8. Chasing Crimson - April 15, 2009
9. Nostalgic Crimson - October 16, 2010
10. Lookback Crimson - July 16, 2011
11. Deciding Crimson - November 15, 2012
12. Final Rising Crimson - June 15, 2013
Polyphonica Crimson S series
Story: Ichirō Sakaki / Illustrations: Noboru Kannatsuki
1. Crimson S (1) - November 15, 2008
2. Crimson S (2) - January 15, 2009
3. Crimson S (3) - March 15, 2009
4. Crimson S (4) - June 15, 2009
5. Crimson S (5) - September 15, 2009
6. Crimson S (6) - March 16, 2010
Polyphonica After School series
Story: Ichirō Sakaki / Illustrations: Noboru Kannatsuki
1. After School 1 - July 17, 2012
2. After School 2 - October 17, 2012
3. After School 3 - March 16, 2013
Polyphonica Black series
Story: Junichi Ōsako / Illustrations: BUNBUN
1. Inspector Black - June 15, 2006
2. Silent Black - August 15, 2006
3. Player Black - December 15, 2006
4. Triangle Black - March 15, 2007
5. Resolution Black - July 15, 2007
6. Patient Black - October 12, 2007
7. Memo Wars Black - February 15, 2008
8. Reliance Black - July 15, 2008
9. Isolation Black - October 15, 2008
10. Liberation Black - January 15, 2009
11. Addration Black - May 15, 2009
12. Promist Black - August 15, 2009
13. Advent Black - November 15, 2009
14. InterLude Black - October 16, 2010
Polyphonica Leon series
Story: Junichi Ōsako / Illustrations: Shinobu Shoryu
1. Leon the Resurrector 1 - November 30, 2007
2. Leon the Resurrector 2 - May 15, 2008
3. Leon the Resurrector 3 - November 15, 2008
4. Leon the Resurrector 4 - April 15, 2009
Polyphonica Gold series
Story: Junichi Ōsako / Illustrations: Shinobu Shoryu
1. Leon the Gold - October 15, 2009
Polyphonica White series
Story: Madoka Takadono / Illustrations: Kinako Hiro
1. Eternal White - July 15, 2006
2. Infinity White - November 15, 2006
3. Missing White - April 15, 2007
4. Anniversary White - September 15, 2007
5. Ancient White - September 11, 2008
6. Spiral White - December 15, 2008
7. Marginal White - March 15, 2009
8. Memories White - June 15, 2009
9. Purely White - February 15, 2010
10. Reunion White - July 15, 2010
11. Regret White - November 15, 2010
12. Wizout White - May 15, 2011
13. Never Ending White - November 15, 2011
Polyphonica Blue series
Story: Toshihiko Tsukiji / Illustrations: Eiji Usatsuka
1. Excite Blue - February 15, 2007
2. Fugitive Blue - June 15, 2007
3. Confusion Blue - August 15, 2009
Polyphonica Dan Sariel series
Story: Toshihiko Tsukij / Illustrations: Kazuaki
1. Dan Sariel and the White Silver Tiger - September 15, 2008
2. Dan Sariel and the Magician of Hydra - April 15, 2009
3. The Quartet of Midnight with Dan Sariel - July 15, 2010
Polyphonica Eiphonic Songbird series
Story: Ichirō Sakaki / Illustrations: Cantok
1. May 15, 2012
2. August 11, 2012
3. March 15, 2014
4. April 15, 2014
Short stories and anthology
1. Marble - January 15, 2007
2. Marble 2 - January 15, 2008
3. Palette - August 10, 2007

=== Manga ===
Written by Ichiro Sakaki and illustrated by Tomo Hirokawa, a manga series adaptation entitled Cardinal Crimson (カーディナル・クリムゾン, Kādinaru Kurimuzon) began serialization as a web comic in March 2007 in FlexComix Blood and ended in 2012. It was collected in nine volumes. The series was picked up for an English release by CMX Manga, with the first volume released on June 29, 2010. They did not release others. Tomo Hirokawa designed a New Year's nengajō for 2008.

The Black series was adapted into a manga series illustrated by Yonemura Koichiro as a web comic and was serialized from December 2008 to 2011 in Flex Comix Next. It was compiled into three volumes.

The White series was adapted into a manga series illustrated by Yoko Fujioka and was serialized from April 2008 to 2011 in Monthly Princess. It was compiled into five volumes.

=== Anime ===
T.O Entertainment adapted Shinkyoku Sōkai Polyphonica into a twelve episode anime series directed by Junichi Watanabe and Masami Shimoda and written by Ichiro Sakaki. On February 6, 2007, one month after the first manga adaptation was announced, the anime adaptation was announced. Broadcast on TBS, the series premiered on April 3, 2007, and aired weekly until its conclusion on June 19, 2007. The music was composed by Hikaru Nanase. Two pieces of theme music were used for the anime. "Apocrypha" is performed by eufonius as the opening theme. "Concordia" (コンコルディア, Konkorudia) is performed by kukui as the ending theme.

Diomedéa adapted the series into another season entitled Shinkyoku Sōkai Polyphonica Crimson S, directed by Toshimasa Suzuki and written by Ken'ichi Kanemaki, that is not a continuation of the first and will tie into Ichiro Sakaki and Noboru Kannatsuki's light novel adaptation of the same name. The official website was launched on November 11, 2008, and began streaming a promotional video on March 23, 2009, featuring the anime's opening theme but contained no actual anime footage. The series premiered on TVK and TV Saitama on March 4, 2009, and is currently broadcasting weekly. The series was also broadcast on AT-X, Gifu Broadcasting, MBS, and Mie TV. The music is directed by Jin Aketagawa and composed by Magic Capsule. Two pieces of theme music were used for the anime. "Phosphorous" is performed by eufonius as the opening theme. Koi no Uta (こいのうた) is performed by Haruka Tomatsu as ending theme.

==== North American releases ====
The Shinkyoku Sōkai Polyphonica anime series was licensed for distribution in North America by Sentai Filmworks. A DVD collection of all 12 episodes, in Japanese language with English subtitles, titled Polyphonica: Complete Collection, was released on November 17, 2009. The second season prequel series Shinkyoku Sōkai Polyphonica Crimson S was licensed for distribution in North America by Maiden Japan. A complete DVD collection titled Polyphonica Crimson S, containing all 12 episodes, in Japanese language with English subtitles, was released on April 3, 2012. Both seasons of the anime series have been posted on the Anime Network website for online streaming.

=== Role-playing game ===
A Shinkyoku Sōkai Polyphonica RPG, published by GA Bunko, went on sale in Japan in August 2008. The game is designed by Takashi Osada and FarEast Amusement Research, and uses the Standard RPG System. The campaign setting is based mainly on Polyphonica Crimson series.

== Music ==
Crimson Series

Theme song: "Crimson Calling" by Rita (Ep 1 & 2)

"Crimson Calling (Ending Ver.)" by Rita (Ep 3 & 4)

Insert song: "Song of Wave" by Yuiko (Ep 3&4)

Ending theme: "Crimson Reason" by Rita (Ep 3 & 4)

Black Series

Theme song: "Hurting Heart" by fripSide

White Series

Theme song: "Until I Forget You" (僕がきみを忘れるまで, Boku ga Kimi o Wasureru Made) by Eri Kitamura

=== CDs ===
Opening Single: "Apocrypha" by eufonius - April 25, 2007
Ending Single: "Concordia" (コンコルディア, Konkorudia) by kukui - May 23, 2007
Game Original Soundtrack: May 25, 2007
Anime Original Soundtrack - Atmosphere: June 27, 2007, composed by Hikaru Nanase
