= Dagashi Kashi =

Japanese manga series

- First tankōbon volume cover, featuring Hotaru Shidare

だがしかし
- Genre: Cooking; Romantic comedy; Slice of life
- Manga
- Written by: Kotoyama
- Published by: Shogakukan
- Imprint: Shōnen Sunday Comics
- Magazine: Weekly Shōnen Sunday
- Original run: June 25, 2014 – April 11, 2018
- Volumes: 11
- Light novel

Dagashi Kashi: Mō Hitotsu no Natsuyasumi
- Written by: Manta Aisora
- Published by: Shogakukan
- Imprint: Gagaga Bunko
- Published: December 18, 2015
- Anime television series
- Directed by: Masato Takayanagi
- Produced by: Junya Okamoto; Junichirō Tanaka; Atsushi Yoshikawa; Masato Mukōda; Takaaki Nakanome; Yasuhiro Yoshimura; Tomoyuki Ōhashi
- Written by: Masato Takayanagi; Yasuko Kamo
- Music by: Tomotaka Ōsumi; Nobuaki Nobusawa
- Studio: Feel
- Licensed by: Crunchyroll (Note: In North America through Crunchyroll, LLC (formerly known as Funimation).)
- Original network: TBS, CBC, SUN, BS-TBS
- Original run: January 7, 2016 – March 31, 2016
- Episodes: 12
- Anime television series

Dagashi Kashi 2
- Directed by: Satoshi Kuwabara
- Produced by: Junichirō Tanaka; Atsushi Yoshikawa; Takaaki Nakanome; Tomoyuki Ōhashi; Yasuyuki Nishiya; Kishō Tsurita; Atsushi Chiku; Yūsuke Terada
- Written by: Mayumi Morita
- Music by: Tomotaka Ōsumi; Nobuaki Nobusawa
- Studio: Tezuka Productions
- Licensed by: Crunchyroll
- Original network: TBS, SUN, BS-TBS
- Original run: January 12, 2018 – March 30, 2018
- Episodes: 12
- icon

Dagashi Kashi (だがしかし) (Note: The title is a play on the Japanese phrases dagashi kashi (meaning "cheap sweets candy") and daga shikashi (an expression meaning "however").) is a Japanese manga series written and illustrated by Kotoyama. It was serialized in Shogakukan's shōnen manga magazine Weekly Shōnen Sunday from June 2014 to April 2018 and has been collected in 11 tankōbon volumes. A light novel adaptation titled Dagashi Kashi: Mō Hitotsu no Natsu Yasumi, written and illustrated by Manta Aisora, was published in a single volume by Shogakukan in December 2015 under their Gagaga Bunko imprint.

An anime television series adaptation produced by Feel aired from January to March 2016. A second season produced by Tezuka Productions aired from January to March 2018.

== Plot ==
Shikada Dagashi, a countryside shop selling cheap candy and snacks ("dagashi") has been run by the Shikada family for nine generations, but Kokonotsu does not want to take over the shop from his father, Yō, instead aiming to become a manga artist. Hotaru Shidare visits the shop one day seeking to recruit Yō to her family's company, the sweets manufacturer Shidare Corporation, but Yō refuses unless Hotaru first can convince Kokonotsu to take over Shikada Dagashi.

== Characters ==
Hotaru Shidare (枝垂 ほたる, Shidare Hotaru)
Voiced by: Ayana Taketatsu (Japanese); Tabitha Ray (English)
An eccentric girl who is very passionate about sweets and snacks. Her father owns a famous snacks company and she came to Shikada store to recruit Yō as their company's planned shop chain's manager. As Yō will not leave as long as Kokonotsu is unwilling to succeed him as Shikada storekeeper, she quickly strikes a deal with him: she will convince Kokonotsu to take over the store in return for his employment. From then on she tries to persuade Kokonotsu using many different ways such as games, stories, and riddles. She is not good at chance games, so uses her other skills to make Kokonotsu consider taking over the shop. She eventually asks Kokonotsu if he wants to marry her.
Kokonotsu Shikada (鹿田 ココノツ, Shikada Kokonotsu)
Voiced by: Atsushi Abe (Japanese); Todd Haberkorn (English)
Kokonotsu and his father Yō live in a countryside town where they run a small sweets store. He aspires to be a manga artist, an ambition that puts him at odds with his father who wants him to inherit the store which has been run by the family for eight generations. He constantly finds himself manning the cash register, more often than not a result of his father's trickery. After Hotaru's arrival, he also has to put up with her antics as well. He is nicknamed Kokonatsu (ココナツ, "Coconuts"). His given name is a Kun'yomi pronunciation of the Japanese numeral 九, Kokonotsu (ここのつ, "Ninth"); it works as a pun, referring to his being the ninth generation of the family that will run the store. Hotaru eventually confesses to him, so he decides to give her an answer once she is back. However, their relationship remains ambiguous after she came back.
Saya Endō (遠藤 サヤ, Endō Saya)
Voiced by: Manami Numakura (Japanese); Sara Ragsdale (English)
Kokonotsu's classmate and childhood friend, who runs a nearby cafe with her older twin brother Tō. She has a longstanding crush on Kokonotsu. At first alarmed by Hotaru's presence, she quickly befriends her, as their goals are aligned: Hotaru wishes Kokonotsu to run the store while she wants him to keep staying in town. Saya has a hidden talent of toy mastery like what she did with ohajiki; at one point she defeats a well-prepared Hotaru at a Menko game, an event that leads Hotaru to start addressing her with suffix shi (師) ('master' in Funimation dub), an antiquated designation used by disciples to their masters.
Tō Endō (遠藤 豆, Endō Tō)
Voiced by: Tatsuhisa Suzuki (Japanese); Justin Pate (English)
Older twin brother of Saya and a good friend of Kokonotsu. A laid back person who usually wears a Hawaiian shirt and sunglasses. He and Saya run a cafe named "Cafe Endō". His antics usually earns the wrath of his twin sister Saya, ending with a bruised face and broken sunglasses.
Yō Shikada (鹿田 ヨウ, Shikada Yō)
Voiced by: Keiji Fujiwara (Japanese); Jeremy Inman (English)
Kokonotsu's father as well as the current owner of Shikada store. He is desperate to make his son the 9th head of the shop so that his legacy will continue. He agrees to Hotaru's bargain that if she can convince his son to be the next head of his shop, he would start working for Hotaru's company as the company's planned dagashi shop chain manager. Like his son, his given name is a Kun'yomi pronunciation of the Japanese numeral 八, Yō (ヨウ, "Eighth"), and works as a pun for his generation of shop owner.
Hajime Owari (尾張 ハジメ, Owari Hajime)
Voiced by: Chinatsu Akasaki (Japanese); Caitlin Glass (English)
An intelligent woman who has trouble keeping a job due to her laziness and other personality quirks. She ends up working at Shikada Dagashi in exchange for room and board.
Beniyutaka Shidare (枝垂 紅豊, Shidare Beniyutaka)
Voiced by: Tomokazu Sugita (Japanese); Chris Wehkamp (English)
Hotaru's older brother and the manager of the local convenience store that recently opened across from Shikada Dagashi. Beni finds dagashi shops too old fashioned. He considers Kokonotsu virtuous and his rival, after he comments on how the stores overpriced cakes wouldn't sell, and recommended selling dagashi aimed at children and adults who would easily buy them.
Tamako Tamai (玉井 たまこ, Tamai Tamako)
Voiced by: Asami Hara (Japanese); Stephanie Young (English)
An old acquaintance of Yō Shikada who runs an okonomiyaki shop.

== Media ==
=== Manga ===
Dagashi Kashi, written and illustrated by Kotoyama, was serialized in Shogakukan's shōnen manga magazine Weekly Shōnen Sunday from June 25, 2014, to April 11, 2018. The series was collected in 11 tankōbon volumes published by Shogakukan from September 18, 2014, to May 18, 2018.

==== Volumes ====
No.	Release date	ISBN
1	September 18, 2014	978-4-09-125125-1
2	March 18, 2015	978-4-09-125399-6
3	October 16, 2015	978-4-09-126210-3
4	March 18, 2015	978-4-09-126570-8; 978-4-09-159222-4 (SE)
5	May 18, 2016	978-4-09-127160-0; 978-4-09-159231-6 (SE)
6	October 18, 2016	978-4-09-127408-3
7	March 17, 2017	978-4-09-127513-4
8	August 10, 2017	978-4-09-127681-0
9	December 18, 2017	978-4-09-127882-1
10	February 16, 2018	978-4-09-128083-1
11	May 18, 2018; May 16, 2018 (SE)	978-4-09-128247-7; 978-4-09-943012-2 (SE)

=== Light novel ===
A light novel adaptation titled Dagashi Kashi: Mō Hitotsu no Natsu Yasumi, written and illustrated by Manta Aisora, was published in a single volume by Shogakukan on December 18, 2015, under their Gagaga Bunko imprint.

=== Anime ===
A 12-episode anime adaptation aired from January 7 to March 31, 2016. It was produced by Feel, and was directed by Masato Takayanagi, who also handled the series composition together with Yasuko Kamo. Kanetoshi Kamimoto was in charge of character design, and Satoshi Motoyama was the series' sound director. The series' opening theme is "Checkmate!?" by Michi, while the ending theme is "Hey Caloric Queen" by Ayana Taketatsu.

A second season, Dagashi Kashi 2, aired from January 12 to March 30, 2018, on TBS, and aired on Sun TV and BS-TBS. For Dagashi Kashi 2, Tezuka Productions took over the series production, with Feel instead being credited for setting cooperation. While Motoyama returned as sound director, several other duties were taken over by new staff: Satoshi Kuwabara directed the season, Mayumi Morita handled the series composition, Nana Miura designed the characters, and Michiko Yokote wrote the script. The voice cast from the first season reprised their roles, and was joined by Chinatsu Akasaki, who voiced the new character Hajime Owari, and Tomokazu Sugita, who voiced Yutaka Beni. The second season's opening theme is "Oh My Sugar Feeling!!" (Oh My シュガーフィーリング!!, Oh My Shugā Fīringu!!) by Taketatsu, while the ending theme is "Okashi na Watashi to Hachimitsu no Kimi" (おかしなわたしとはちみつのきみ; "The Candied Me and the Honeyed You") by Hachimitsu Rocket. Dagashi Kashi 2 aired in a shared half-hour time slot together with Takunomi, both of which consist of fifteen-minute episodes. Like its first season, Dagashi Kashi 2 lasted for 12 episodes.

== Reception ==
Dagashi Kashi ranked #5 on the "Nationwide Bookstore Employees' Recommended Comics" by the Honya Club website in 2016. The series was nominated for the 41st Kodansha Manga Awards in 2017, in the "best shōnen manga" category.

=== Sales ===
In September 2015, when the anime adaptation was announced, the two manga volumes that were released at the time had sold a 450,000 copies combined; when the fourth volume came out in December 2015, sales had risen to a total of 1.2 million copies. By the time the anime premiered in January 2016, the manga has 1.6 million copies in print, doubling the average number of copies sold per volumes compared to before the anime announcement, to 400,000 copies per volume. The manga had over 3 million copies in print as of April, 2018.

== See also ==
- Call of the Night, another manga series by the same author
