= Corpse Princess =

Japanese manga and anime series

- Shikabane Hime manga volume 1 cover.

屍姫 (Shikabane Hime)
- Genre: Action, supernatural, thriller
- Manga
- Written by: Yoshiichi Akahito
- Published by: Square Enix
- English publisher: NA: Yen Press
- Magazine: Monthly Shōnen Gangan
- Original run: April 12, 2005 – August 12, 2014
- Volumes: 23
- Anime television series
- Directed by: Masahiko Murata
- Produced by: Keiichi Kashiwada; Tomoko Kawasaki; Nobuyuki Kurashige; Hiroyuki Yamaga
- Written by: Shō Aikawa
- Music by: Norihito Sumitomo
- Studio: Feel; Gainax
- Licensed by: Crunchyroll
- Original network: AT-X
- English network: NA: Funimation Channel
- Original run: October 2, 2008 – March 26, 2009
- Episodes: 25 + OVA
- icon

Corpse Princess (Japanese: 屍姫, Hepburn: Shikabane Hime) is a Japanese manga series written and illustrated by Yoshiichi Akahito. Premiering in Monthly Shōnen Gangan on April 12, 2005, the series centers on the "Corpse Princess" Makina Hoshimura, an undead girl who is hunting down 108 undead corpses in order to gain entry into heaven with the help of a secret society of anti-corpse Buddhist monks.

Feel and Gainax partnered together to adapt the series into a thirteen episode anime series. The first season, Aka (赫; Red), aired on October 2, 2008, on AT-X and finished on December 25, 2008. A second season, Kuro (玄; Black), aired between January and March 2009. The anime is licensed for North American distribution and release by Funimation, which has released the episodes in subtitled form as Shikabane Hime through various online distribution companies and through its own website.

The series made its North American television debut on the Funimation Channel on November 15, 2010.

== Premise ==
After being murdered, Makina Hoshimura turns into a living "Shikabane Hime" ("Corpse Princess"). Armed with dual MAC-11 submachine guns, she must kill 108 other Shikabane in order to gain entry into heaven. She is assisted in this task by Keisei Tagami, a Buddhist monk with links to an anti-corpse group known as the Kougon Sect. Her ultimate goal is to avenge the death of her family, by destroying the Shikabane known as the Seven Stars.

== Characters ==
=== Main ===
Makina Hoshimura (星村 眞姫那, Hoshimura Makina)
Voiced by: Nana Akiyama (Japanese); Luci Christian (English)
Makina appears as a sailor-uniformed high school girl with long purple hair tied with a red ribbon, and two braided pigtails that end in metal hoops. As a Shikabane Hime, Makina is tasked with killing 108 Shikabane to gain entrance to heaven; in the first volumes of the manga, there is a countdown of how many Shikabane she still has left to kill. She chooses to be a Hime in order to find who had killed her and her family.^{Ep. 6-7} She has formidable physical skills, and her weapons of choice are two Ingram MAC-11 submachine guns. Her Contracted Monk is Keisei Tagami. Later in the story, it is revealed that her family discovered the process of making a Shikabane Hime and was killed by the Seven Stars who made Makina into a Shikabane.^{Ep. 10-13} Despite her initial misgivings about Ouri's potential interference with her missions,^{Ep. 1-4}, she becomes his new Contracted Monk after Keisei's death.^{Ep. 12}
Ouri Kagami (花神 旺里, Kagami Ōri)
Voiced by: Tatsuya Hasome (Japanese); Aaron Dismuke (English)
A high school boy who was raised at Keisei Tagami's temple. He treats Keisei as his brother even though they are not blood related. Ouri often appears where Makina and the Shikabane are by following a mysterious black cat that talks with him. The temple kids nickname him Hanagami (anime dub translation: "wussy boy").^{Ep. 1, 4} Later on after Keisei's death, he becomes Makina's new Contracted Monk.^{Ep. 12} At the start of the anime series, he moves from the temple to try to live on his own, and takes on part-time jobs.^{Ep. 1}
Keisei Tagami (田神 景世, Tagami Keisei)
Voiced by: Keiji Fujiwara (Japanese); J. Michael Tatum (English)
Keisei Tagami is a Buddhist priest under the anti-Shikabane organization known as the Kougon Sect. He found Ouri Kagami as a three-year-old child and raised him at his temple orphanage.^{Ep. 1} Keisei was an orphan himself, raised by Makina Hoshimura's father. When the Hoshimura family was brutally murdered, he agreed to become Makina's Contracted Monk. He is something of a pervert, often placing "pervy anime posters", "zenbu-nose" figurines, and dirty magazines in Ouri's possessions.^{Ep. 1-4} At the end of the anime's first season he is mortally stabbed and then sacrifices himself to defeat Akasha. He then transfers his contract to Ouri.^{Ep. 11,12}

=== Shikabane Hime ===
==== Anime and manga ====
Akira Tooka (遠岡 アキラ, Tōoka Akira)
Voiced by: Aoi Yūki (Japanese); Anastasia Munoz (English)
Sadahiro's cynical Shikabane Hime, who has dark hair and wears a light purple headband. She works at the bar that Ouri part-times at, and often hits Sadahiro to stop him from saying something stupid.^{Ep. 2, 6} Almost nothing is revealed about her past in the anime, except for her cause of death by a Shikabane. She fights using a sniper rifle. She is the only Shikabane Hime that is allowed to kill humans.^{Ep. 6-7} In Chapter 90 of the manga she is revealed to have lost her entire family to Shikabanes and sought out Sadahiro to put her former loved ones out of their misery. Sadahiro duly carried out her request, but she was fatally wounded by one of the Shikabanes in the process and then, for an unspecified reason, revived as a Shikabane Hime. Kohaku Hoshimura describes her as being fully committed to find salvation rather than seeing it as almost an afterthought like most Shikabane Himes do.
Minai Ruo (瑠翁 水薙生, Ruo Minami)
Voiced by: Yuka Hirata (Japanese); Colleen Clinkenbeard (English)
Isaki's Shikabane Hime.
In OVA she is noted for her green hair and her red butterfly hairclip that she wears on her left side.^{Ep. 2} Her weapon of choice is a pair of knuckled gauntlets.^{Ep. 2} She became a Shikibane Hime when she committed suicide after killing her abusive boyfriend and thinks that her existence is a form of punishment, although Ouri disagrees.^{Ep. 7} She was intended to be Keisei's Shikabane Hime but Isaki volunteered to be her Contracted Monk. From the start, there was doubt as to whether or not Minai could be a Shikabane Hime because her contract was incomplete, but Sadahiro and Akira's investigation revealed that Isaki didn't lie about his having a bond with her; they had indeed met in the past when they were kids. She later grows close to Ouri, but before a relationship could be formed, Isaki was killed; despite Sadahiro's offer to help her transferring her bond to Ouri, she ultimately allowed herself to be terminated rather than taking up the offer or reverting to a rogue Shikabane.^{Ep. 8}

Her manga original is characterized very sparsely albeit still differently, wearing a school uniform like Makina as well as being armed with a New Nambu M60 revolver and a knife, and ending up killed by Shikabanes created by Akasha (the Kougon Sect learning of her demise at the end of Chapter 2).
Saki Amase (天瀬 早季, Amase Saki)
Voiced by: Mika Kikuchi (Japanese); Monica Rial (English)
Rika's partnered Shikabane Hime. Saki is a 10-year-old mischievous girl with blonde hair who enjoys teasing Rika by sharing Rika's romantic feelings about her colleagues and is usually seen munching on chips or drinking juice^{Ep. 7}. She was Rika's only childhood friend, and the two became very close due to Rika essentially living in isolation and Saki's cheerful, boyish behaviors. She was fatally injured when the fireworks they played in secret accidentally caused fire. Rika, after a dying Saki begged her for help, had Saki's body frozen until she is capable of undertaking the ritual to turn Saki into a Shikabane Hime. Moved by Rika's resolve to answer her plead and mitigate her regret for dying young, Saki became extremely protective of Rika. In the manga, her weapon of choice is a pair of axes, while in the anime, she uses a war hammer. Unlike other Shikabane Hime, her Contracted Monk happens to be one of the ten great holy families, which means that no ordinary Shikabane can defeat her.^{Ep. 8} In manga Chapter 63, after Rika is dismembered by Lee Li Hong, Saki merges with Rika to repair her body. Following Lee's termination, Saki returns control of the repaired body to Rika, thus passing on as her obsession of protecting Rika is fulfilled.
Itsuki Yamagami (山神 異月, Yamagami Itsuki)}
Voiced by: Chise Nakamura (Japanese); Cherami Leigh (English)
Takamasa's Shikabane Hime with the very large pink bow at the back of her hair.^{Ep. 5} She died in an automobile accident and came back with the regret of not living the life of a teenage girl. She bonded with Takamasa because she thought he was a powerful monk and would help her get to Heaven faster. Unfortunately, Takamasa knew nothing about the Shikabane Hime before that. Regardless, the two continued to work as a team. During their time, they began to develop romantic feelings for each other. However, they were unable to act on them because Itsuki was a Shikabane Hime. She fights with a pair of M945 Combat handguns. In the anime series, she joins Ouri's class as a transfer student, immediately trying to befriend him.^{Ep. 5}
Kamika Todoroki (轟旗 神佳, Todoroki Kamika)
Voiced by: Yui Horie (Japanese); Terri Doty (English)
Takamine's Shikabane Hime. Nicknamed "The Sword Princess,"^{Ep. 12} Kamika has been referred to as the strongest Shikabane Hime not necessarily for the level of her strength, but her regret and will. She is typically seen wearing glasses and a button shirt like a secretary.^{Ep. 5} In manga, her mortal death came about when she ran into Shikabanes in her quest to challenge and defeat the strongest warrior in the world, which became her obsession as a Shikabane Hime. Late during the fall of Kougon Sect headquarters, she is given Ame no Murakumo no Tsurugi in order to kill Sugami Maen. Despite initially being decapitated by the King of Shikabanes, her determination prompted the spirit of the legendary sword to make her an avatar of Chika'eshi no Ōkami, the gate guardian to the world of the dead, allowing her to rematerialize one last time and deliver the killing blow in Chapter 79. Her obsession thus fulfilled and as dictated by her godhood, she vanishes from the mortal realm for good, being sacrificed willingly alongside a fatally-wounded Takamine to keep Sugami Maen sealed forever in the afterlife.
Touma Sawamiya (沢宮 冬麻, Sawamiya Tōma)
Umehara's Shikabane Hime (the sole one in manga) and having been so for more than a decade. Umehara calls her "S Monster from S Universe" because she often appears to derive pleasure from inflicting pains on him whenever he does something perverted, but the two of them in fact trust and care for each others deeply. She is most often seen armed with a staff although she is also proficient with various throwing and close-quarter combat weapons.
Flesh Backbone (フレッシュ゠バックボーン, Furesshu Bakkubōn)
Voiced by: Aya Endō (Japanese); Alexis Tipton (English)
One of Umehara's Shikabane Hime in anime, who is as much an otaku as Umehara himself, although the two can have even more passionate arguments than normal Makina and otaku Keisei would have had over conflicts on two-dimensional vs. three-dimensional or doujinshi vs. figurines. In fact, she was a foreigner who had died in a plane accident on her way to Akihabara. The other Shikabane Hime of Umehara is Touma (who only appeared in the manga), who is away on a vacation of sorts and seems to strike fear in her Contracted Monk. She was the unknown female that was peeking outside Makina's cave, and she has brought news about her.
Hibiki (響)
Traitor Monk Akasha Shishidou's lost Shikabane Hime and his primary motivation behind seeking to destroy the Kougon Sect.
In anime she was Akasha's fiancé in life and considered a comparable to even Kamika Todoroki. After killing 108 Shikabanes, however, she became a Destroyer Shikabane and eventually died by the hands of Akasha.
In manga he and Hibiki were total strangers and in fact did not even have anything build a strong bond on. Unbeknownst to Akasha, she had a husband in life who she remains emotionally attached to despite being prevented by circumstance to ever see him again. She took advantage of the fact that Akasha never bothered asking about her past to conceal her desire to avoid death or becoming a rogue Shikabane. After she was fatally wounded in a botched mission against Hazama and could not regenerate due to her bond with Akasha not being strong enough, Akasha performed the Shikabane Hime induction ritual (an art that is forbidden to anyone not of the Ten Great Holy Families) on her again in hope of rejuvenating their bond, but again because Hibiki's connection with Akasha remained weak, she was transformed into a grotesque monster that needed to be put out of her misery. She is brought back to life (as Akasha's Shikabane Hime) by a deified Kohaku in Chapter 98, and proceeds to disclose the truth to Akasha, which emotionally devastates him. When Akasha turns on Kohaku and perhaps because of Akasha's declaration that, despite the truth, he still has feelings for her, she nonetheless decides to fight to protect Akasha and ends up erased from existence by Kohaku while trying to help Akasha escape.

==== Manga only ====
Kanae Yatagi (八滝 叶江, Yatagi Kanae)
A mature Shikabane Hime who only appeared in the manga with her younger partner, Sousetsu Kashio. She uses her whip to attack and tie down her enemies. Presumed to be dead during the failed attempt to assassinate Sugami Maen.
Aki Asuka (飛鳥 堯, Asuka Aki)
A silent Shikabane Hime who is exclusive to the manga, her Contracted Monk is Takehiko Mutou, whom she agrees with his ideals of "killing Shikabane equals to salvation for their souls". Fights with a sniper rifle. Presumed to be killed during the failed attempt to assassinate Sugami Maen along with Mutou and several others when they stayed behind to allow the survivors to escape from Hizuchi and Hazama.
Iroha Kisaragi (如月 いろは, Kisaragi Iroha)
The actual younger sister of her Contracted Monk, Jin Kisaragi. She uses a pair of sais in battle. During the failed attempt to assassinate Sugami Maen, she lets her body be ripped apart by Hazama in order to deliver a crippling blow. She was torn into shreds by an angered Hazama along with Jin, who stayed by her side till the end.
Anzu Chikasaki (千ヶ崎 杏, Chigasaki Anzu)
A quirky Shikabane Hime who always squabbled with her Contracted Monk, Nagatomo Kashin. She fights with a pair of sub-machine guns like Makina, she was the first to be killed during the failed attempt to assassinate Sugami Maen when Hokuto decapitates her with a kick.
Uruko Baroque (潤子 バロック, Uruko Barokku)
A flirtatious Shikabane Hime who would fight as long as her Contracted Monk, Hayashita Ayamitsu, said she could, as she is constantly craving for fights. She fights with a hand saw which she named "Britonian". During the failed attempt to assassinate Sugami Maen, she was eaten by Hizuchi after she lost her legs to him, but still managed to cripple him before that.
Mutsuha Mutsuhana (六ツ花 睦葉, Mutsuhana Mutsumi)
A young Shikabane Hime who is always seen wearing western clothes and a hat, she gets upset whenever her Contracted Monk, Hayatate Touto, starts his binge on alcoholic drinks. Her weapon is a chain connected to a shield at both ends, used to shield her allies from afar and could even be used as a flail. Presumed to be killed with the others during the failed attempt to assassinate Sugami Maen.

=== Monks ===
Sadahiro Mibu (壬生 貞比呂, Mibu Sadahiro)
Voiced by: Junichi Suwabe (Japanese); Eric Vale (English)
The Contracted Monk of Akira Tooka, and is working undercover to keep an eye on Ouri and Keisei.^{Ep. 6} At the start of the series, he is introduced as Ouri's boss at the Parthenon bar.^{Ep. 2-3} He is a bit laid back. He was former roommates with Keisei Tagami and Akasha Shishidou.^{Ep. 6}
In manga's epilogue, he ends up being chosen as the new Dai Sojo of the Kougon Sect although primarily because his potential competitor, Shiou Tokihana, refuses to assume that role.
Rika Aragami (荒神 莉花, Aragaki Rika)
Voiced by: Saeko Chiba (Japanese); Cynthia Cranz (English)
Rika Aragami is the sole female Contracted Monk in the Kougon Sect. She has light short hair and often goes about her business with her shirt unbuttoned, showing her well-endowed chest in a black bra. She is a Gon Sojo who works at the district office.^{Ep. 4} She is one of the ten Great Holy Families, which are the descendants of the ten senior disciples of the Founder and obligated to become Contracted Monk to a Shikabane Hime.^{Ep. 4, 8} She is an expert in medicines, both traditional and modern, partially due to her family background and is almost never seen without Saki Amase, her Shikabane Hime.
Takamasa Sougi (送儀 嵩征, Sōgi Takamasa)
Voiced by: Tokuyoshi Kawashima (Japanese); Joel McDonald (English)
The Contracted Monk of Itsuki Yamagami.^{Ep. 5} In manga, this otherwise highly-gifted monk is in a constant struggle trying to determine what to do with his relationship with Ituski- initially viewing her as nothing more than just an average girl given supernatural attributes, when he hesitated to fight a close-friend-turned-Shikabane, he not only ended up almost killed by the Shikabane but also caught Ituski with the same cursed expression, realizing that no victim of becoming a Shikabane is safe from its corrupting influence, and that Shikabane Himes have the same destructive potential as their enemies and must never be treated as regular human beings. Both he and Itsuki try to prevent Ouri from making a similar mistake with Makina, but at the same time their actions show signs that they want Ouri to prove them wrong. Takamasa often fights alongside Itsuki using a bow and arrow.^{Ep. 5-6} In the anime series, he joins Ouri's school as a new health teacher, and assumes the title of Genpaku in the Kougon Sect, the youngest to do so at age 19.^{Ep. 5}
Sougen Takamine (高峰 宗現, Takamine Sōgen)
Voiced by: Hidenori Nakamura (Japanese); Kent Williams (English)
The Sojo (leader) of the district. The Contracted Monk of Kamika Tomoroki and the former mentor of Keisei Tagami.^{Ep. 5} In manga, he ends up fatally wounded by Keito during the final battle against Sugami Maen and uses his last remaining strength protecting Kougon Sect survivors from the King of Shikabanes' hell fire so that he can die alongside Kamika, in the end willingly sacrificed alongside his Shikabane Hime in fulfilment of her new role as a gate guardian to the world of the dead.
Kanechika Umehara (梅原 鉦近, Umehara Kanechika)
Voiced by: Masaki Terasoma (Japanese); Christopher Bevins (English)
One of the Six Sojos and a colleague of Takamine, he is the contracted monk of Touma Sawamiya and (in anime only) Flesh Backbone as well as the mentor for Takamasa and later Ouri. He is well-known both for being willing to frequently participate in field combat despite his high status and for his perverted disposition. He does also have the reputation of being well versed in Shikabanes.
In Chapter 96 of the manga he was erased from existence by the deified Kohaku Hoshimura, and his bond with Touma along with him. While he was restored following Kohaku's defeat, Touma's regret/obsession was not and Touma herself is thus lost forever, leading Umehara, wracked with guilt over failing to help her find salvation, to leave the Kougon Sect in the epilogue.
Akasha Shishidou (鹿堂 赤紗, Shishidō Akasha)
Voiced by: Mitsuru Miyamoto (Japanese); Jessie James Grelle (English)
Known as the Traitor Monk, he was formerly a high-ranking monk in the Kougon Sect. He was in charge of the Suppression Unit but his squad was annihiliated and his Shikabane Hime was torn in two. A week later, he killed his Hime and stole some of the scriptures from the Temple. He believes that the Hime are being manipulated by the Sect into murdering their own kind. He gathers the blood of 108 people who have died and become Shikabane and uses that to invoke his advanced zadan techniques.^{Ep. 5-7} In manga he assisted Ōzei no Kegare in bringing Sugami Maen back to mortal realm seemingly out of the sole desire of destroying Kougon Sect. After Sugami Maen's defeat, he throws his lot with Kohaku Hoshimura as the latter takes over the Kougon Sect, with a more apparent agenda involving his lost Shikabane Hime.
He was proud and strong in his faith, until he was forced to kill his Shikabane Hime, Hibiki, under different circumstances across different media. In anime Hibiki was his fiancé in life but, after killing 108 Shikabanes, became a Destroyer Shikabane and eventually died by the hands of Akasha. Afterwards, he went into exile for five years before allying with the Seven Stars in order to bring down the Kougon Sect, eventually becoming the Contract Monk for Hokuto. However, in the final episode he rejects Hokuto in a bid to reunite with Hibiki, causing Hokuto to revert into a rogue Shikabane and to kill him.
In manga he and Hibiki were total strangers, but he developed an emotional attachment to his Shikabane Hime without truly understanding her. He was manipulated by the Shujou faction into reapplying the Shikabane Hime induction ritual on Hibiki after she was fatally wounded in a botched field mission (of which Akasha is the sole survivor), but because the bond between the two is largely one-sided, Hibiki was transformed into a grotesque monster that needed to be put out of her misery (while the act is attributed to him, he actually ran away instead). He later found out that this whole event was predicated on the fact that even when a Shikabane Hime destroys a Shikabane, the resulting virtue is passed on to her Contract Monk instead of aiding her own salvation, causing him to rebel in belief that the Kougon Sect exploited Shikabane Himes, first and foremost Hibiki. He finally learns the truth via intervention by a deified Kohaku in Chapter 98, and while emotionally devastated to learn that he is not the most important person to her, his resolve is restored after witnessing that Hibiki nonetheless fights to the bitter end to protect him. After Kohaku is defeated, Akasha finishes off the mortally-wounded Kohaku for wiping Hibiki from existence and, now left with nothing and no one to return to, is then taken in by Aegis' vassals in Chapter 110.
Shiou Tokihana (紫央 時花, Shiō Tokihana)
The Gon Dai Sojo and therefore second-in-command of the Kougon Sect, as well as a member of the Shiou Clan, one of the Ten Great Holy Families.
A very capable and pragmatic administrator, he maintains a balance in power dynamics between the Shuhou and Shujou factions prior to the devastation of Kougon Sect headquarters by Sugami Maen as well as a working relationship with the government. After the death of Dai Sojo by Sugami Maen's hands, he is able to promptly enlist assistance from the Great Church of the West in response, apparently allaying all concerns over its ramifications within the Sect. He has a tendency of treating everything and everyone as assets to be utilized fully while acting in his official capacity if only because, as a devout believer of Kougon Sect's teaching, everything he does is in service of the Kougon Sect's founding goal.

Despite being the highest-ranking priest alive by manga's epilogue, he refuses to ascend to become the new Dai Sojo, leading to Sadahiro Mibu eventually assuming that position.
Shuuji Isaki (伊佐木 修二, Isaki Shūji)
Voiced by: Tomokazu Sugita (Japanese); Mike McFarland (English)
The Contracted Monk of Minai Ruo. He has a shaved head with two slash marks on his left cheek.^{Ep. 2} He is ambitious and aspires to advance in the Kougon Sect.^{Ep. 7} In the OVA it has revealed a little of his past and his hatred for his older brother. Isaki was made a contracted monk due to his brother's contacts. He intended to use Minai to kill his older brother, and claim the reasons that Minai killed his brother was because he was unholy and became a Shikabane. Isaki and Minai both knew they did not have a bond, but before Minai would turn into a Shikabane, he wanted to become higher status to be even higher than Keisei and even be the main monks, to bring down his brother. As it turns out, both Minai and Isaki did form a bond because they had met a long time ago- in Isaki's family store, which young Minai went to frequently as a child. Isaki doesn't show compassion for Minai and tends to order Minai around disparagingly^{Ep. 2, 3, 7}, but he actually did care for her. He ends up killed not in the line of duty but in a clash with street thugs.
In manga, he is given very little characterization except for being a protégé of Takamine and ends up killed alongside Minai by Akasha (the Kougon Sect having learned of his death at the end of Chapter 2).
Honda (本多)
Voiced by: Nobutoshi Canna (Japanese); Anthony Bowling (English)
A monk that works in the Kougon Sect. He does not have a Shikabane Hime, but joins on the missions as the Inspector to observe the pairs.^{Ep. 1} He is later called to observe Ouri to see that he isn't getting involved in the Sect's matters.^{Ep. 5} Following Keisei's death, he is promoted to an administrative role in Chapter 16 of manga, with Rinsen Shirae being in turn promoted as his successor.
Like Shuuji, he has a shaved head, but does not have slash marks on his face.^{Ep. 1}
Rinsen Shirae (白江 鈴千, Shirae Rinsen)
A subordinate of Honda and later his replacement as the regional Head Inspector after Keisei's death ^{Ep. 13}. He has a conscientious and earnest personality, speaking politely but to the point and rational, and a strict adherent of protocols. While this makes him come off as impersonal and even harsh at times, he in fact has excellent judgments, can readily recognize the abilities of others, and is willing to concede when he is proven wrong. He is also quite caring towards Contract Monks under his charge and actively supports them in the field. Likewise, despite initial skepticism about Ouri, he eventually comes to trust him after working with him on the frontline for a while.
He is visually recognizable via heterochromatic eyes and an androgynous overall appearance.

=== Ōzei no Kegare ===
Ōzei no Kegare (大群) is an unusually-large and -organized group of Shikabanes dedicated to resurrecting their "King" and eventually bringing about the "Land of the Dead", where the living cannot pass on when they die but become Shikabanes. To facilitate the resurrection of their King, a ritual must be performed by five Hierarchs, the most powerful Shikabanes in existence and one of them currently being of the Seven Stars. This group serve as the primary antagonists for over the first 17 volumes of the manga.

Sugami Maen (崇神 魔縁)
The supreme leader ("King") of Ōzei no Kegare and formerly an emperor in ancient Japan. After being deposed and exiled, he attempted to make amends with the new emperor but was rebuffed. Snubbed, he became a vengeful spirit upon his death, and despite him being later venerated into godhood in a futile attempt to placate his anger, his hatred for all things living remains unabated. When he was reborn in Chapter 21, he renounced his human identity and adopted his current name. Despite his initial success in destroying Kougon Sect's headquarters, his dream of Hell on Earth is ultimately thwarted when he is banished from the mortal realm again by Kamika Todoroki wielding Ame no Murakumo no Tsurugi in Chapter 79.
Keito (計都)
One of the five current Hierarchs. The top samurai of an ancient Japanese emperor, he is the oldest Shikabane in existence (having been one for over 800 years), and his loyalty to Sugami Maen is both unwavering and unrivaled. Already renown for archery while he was alive, as an undead he has acquired an ability to control blood at will, most notably shaping it into arrows and launching them at his enemies with tremendous power. When Sugami Maen is banished to the world of the dead again, Keito willingly allows himself to be sealed alongside so that he can continue to serve his liege in the afterlife.
Devlort Aegis (ディフロト・アイギス, Difurot Aigisu)
One of the five current Hierarchs. The only surviving heir of one of the strongest families of vampire in Europe who had an appearance of a young man with an aura of nobility, he came to Japan not out of any admiration for the former Japanese emperor but to learn the secret of kingship from him and then to restore his family to its former glory. He is often accompanied by his vassal, Gregorio, an older brother figure whom he calls "Rio" for short. His powers grew immensely large as he completely drains the blood of a dying Gregorio, which awakens Aegis's full potential as a vampire. Despite that power, he was quickly subdued and sealed in a coffin for "future negotiations".
Lee Li Hong (リオン・リン, 李黎紅, Leon Lin)
One of the five current Hierarchs. A Chinese Shikabane who uses her Taoist curses in battle, her source of magic are ten silver rings that protect her from dying in 10 ways, in the range of burning, drowning/suffocation, freezing, electrocution, poison, illness, starvation and death from projectiles, blunt and sharp weapons. She stayed behind during the early portion of the Sugami Maen Arc and only went on the offense after Sugami Maen was successfully brought back to the mortal realm.
When she was alive in ancient China, she was nearly eaten by hungry villagers driven mad by famine. Escaping into a valley, she fell off and was left to die until she met a "Chinese Immortal", who in reality is just a Shikabane. Forced to make a decision between becoming his slave or getting devoured by him, Li Hong chose enslavement out of her aversion of death and was then converted into a Shikabane like him. She secretly learned his curse while being a slave, however, and finally killed him once she mastered everything. Since then, Li Hong lived a whimsical life killing people for amusement.
Her major weakness, however, is self-harm/suicide, a form of death she had no concept of and therefore never developed any curse to protect against. This is capitalized during the fall of Kougon Sect headquarters in Chapter 63 by Saki Amase when the Shikabane Hime took Lee's right hand to repair the body of Rika Aragami (whom, after getting cut in half by Lee, Saki merged with to save) and then thrusted the hand through Lee's skull, destroying her brain and killing her. In her final moment she realizes that, despite having always been driven by her unwavering desire to avoid death, she has never had anything to live for.
Milam Partho (ミラム・バルドゥ, Miramu Partu)
One of the five current Hierarchs. An Indian Shikabane based on the goddess Kali who has her own cult because of her powers, beauty and charisma.
With her eyes constantly closed and dressed in a revealing sari, Milam was a mysterious Shikabane who is graceful and terrifying at the same time, being very well mannered like the "Kumari" she was treated back in her cult.
Her abilities includes mind control and usage of illusions, which she can only use with a special powder made from mummified corpses, her nightmarish illusions are strong enough to even corrode the flesh. Her proficiency with a pair of scimitars she hides under her skirt is equally high as well.
Gregorio Vlaupnir (グレゴリオ・ヴラウブニル, Guregorio Vuraubuniru)
A vassal to Aegis and his family, which he served for over 300 hundred years and he fights with a rapier, although a Shikabane, Gregorio strictly obeys a code of chivalry and would do anything to help his current master, Aegis, regain control of the world like how his family used to in the past.
He died shielding a fatal attack meant for Aegis, his blood was then sucked dry from his dying body by Aegis via Gregorio's own dying request.

=== Seven Stars ===
The Seven Stars (七星, Shichisei) are a group of seven Shikabane who work together for their common cause. They kill humans as well as other Shikabanes and even oppose the Kougon sect. Each member has seven stars of the Big Dipper constellation carved into their skin. They were responsible for killing Makina and her family.^{Ep. 10-13}

Hokuto (北斗)
Voiced by: Chika Fujimura (Japanese); Brina Palencia (English)
The 7th star of the group, appearing as a girl with short silver hair and a scar down the left side of her cheek.^{Ep. 10} A special Shikabane who has seemingly no regrets, obsessions or even nature within her. Her death however, makes her one of the most dangerous, yet powerful undead being around. She was raised as a sacrifice, born to be killed as a child. She never experienced grief, pain, sadness or even happiness. Right after being killed, she is reborn as a Shikabane. She escaped with Hazama in the final episode, but is tracked down by Makina and Ouri. The series ends with her and Makina continuing their battle, with Makina saying that she will make Hokuto remember what it means to be alive. In manga, she in her former life was one of many girls sold to a village as a vassal of Miroku Bosatsu; she initially believed her arrival at the village to be some pre-ordained destiny, only to find out that she like all the girls before her was to be either starved to death when the local harvest went well or executed for the perceived crime of failing to protect the village when the harvest went poorly. After her lynching, she became a Shikabane in Chapter 95 and, during a chance encounter and subsequent killing of a Hoshimura ancestor, foresaw her pre-ordained destiny with Makina. It is further elaborated in Chapter 109 that her obsession is absolute dedication, which in a stroke of irony is better fulfilled by Makina's drive for vengeance than even the companionship of the Seven Stars. Having lost to Makina in a duel for the last time in the same chapter, she embraces Makina as the latter administers the coup de grâce.
Hazama (狭間)
Voiced by: Toru Ohkawa (Japanese); Christopher Sabat (English)
The 1st star of the group. Hazama has giant centipedes for arms. At first glance, most assume that he was the leader of the Seven Stars. In reality, he is the right hand of the true leader, Hokuto.^{Ep. 10} He is responsible for the ambush that led to the death of Akasha's Shikibane Hime. After his plan to use Hokuto to assault the Kougon Sect fails he escapes with her in the final episode. In the manga he took over from Hokuto the role of Hierarch out of concern for Hokuto's potentially violent behaviors towards other Hierarchs should they actually meet one another. In Chapter 94, he is revealed to be a centipede from an ancient era that became a Shikabane after consuming cursed blood of fallen soldiers on battlefield. He eventually came across a village that was a failed "civilization experiment" of the Hoshimuras and found a shrine maiden that would eventually become Hokuto. He ended up being attracted to Hokuto for her apparent ability to see the nature of the universe and formed the Seven Stars to promote her as the "Ultimate Shikabane". He only finds out in Chapter 109 that, in putting Hokuto onto a pedestal, the Seven Stars end up denying her the intimacy that she longs for. He subsequently asks to be finished off and buried next to Hokuto in hope of realizing both his obsession and devotion to her in the afterlife.
Ena (重無)
Voiced by: Michi Niino (Japanese); Todd Haberkorn (English)
The 5th star of the group. He appears as an androgynous boy- his body actually belonged to his sculpture model, who he strangled to death after he was enraged by the boy's injuries (thus, in his mind, a blemish on the boy's beauty). In anime, he is able to possess a person by touching them^{Ep. 11, 12}, and his curse allows him to switch from one corpse to another, as long as they are nearby. When he was alive he was an artist who slashed his paintings, killed his models, and finally committed suicide. He was killed by Makina Hoshimura. In manga, he became specifically obsessed with what he sees as beauty in a futile struggle against death and, because his obsession is foreign to his current body, can regenerate from even physical damage to his brain. He is able to instill evil spirits into corpses to reanimate and even mutate them into the likenesses of those spirits in their former lives- this ability extends to a lesser extent to Shikabane Himes in the form of manipulating their bodies for a short period of time. He directly participated in Makina's mortal death and comes into conflict with her again when he attempts to corrupt the ground of Ouri's school into a prototype hell in support of Sugami Maen's scheme. In Chapter 33, his obsession is overwhelmed by Makina's sheer desire to exterminate the Seven Stars and, having been turned into the very beauty he seeks to recreate due to her aggression, weakened and then destroyed shortly afterwards.
Isaka (忌逆)
Voiced by: Takaya Hashi (Japanese); T.A. Taylor (English)
The 3rd star of the group. Known for his ability to open portals. In manga he was a wealthy man who futilely entertained himself by kidnapping and trapping strangers in his mansion to be eaten by his pet tiger. His mortal death at Hokuto's hands became a moment of liberation from utter boredom, leading to his reanimation. As an undead he is capable of creating and then freely-manipulating dungeons shaped in the image of his mansion. In Chapter 47 he attempts to intercept Kougon Sect troops on their way to assassinate Sugami Maen by trapping them in his dungeons but proves unable to contain Makina's obsession-driven strength, and he is terminated before another dungeon could be conjured up to trap her again.
Izuwa (雷輪)
The 4th star of the group in manga. He is capable of using cursed telephone transmission to drive his victims to suicide and possessing the cellphones of his victims to create decoys of him. He uses the first ability as a venue to collect blood from his dying victims, which would become cursed as the said victims expire; after being weakened by Keisei via the destruction of both the cellphone he uses as a medium and the container for the blood he collected, he was terminated by Makina in Chapter 9.
Hizuchi (歪質)
Voiced by: Tatsuhisa Suzuki (Japanese); Jerry Jewell (English)
The 2nd star of the group. In anime, Ouri's mother was responsible for his death, and therefore he was determined to make Ouri pay for what happened to him. He was killed by Ouri and Makina. In manga, he was a terminal cancer patient who was unable to eat any solid food due to his illness-induced pains. He is therefore obsessed with eating as a Shikabane, and his weak point is in fact his mouth rather than his brain; his ultimate goal behind joining the Seven Stars is to eat Hokuto. He can also temporarily strengthen his arms and legs in order to overpower his preys. He is terminated by Kohaku Hoshimura in Chapter 84 after the latter raids the Seven Stars' hideout following the defeat of Sugami Maen.
Toya (頭屋, Tōya)
Voiced by: Sumire Morohoshi (Japanese); Jamie Marchi (English)
The 6th star of the group. The most bizarre looking of the Seven Stars. She appears to be a man covered in a coat, but where a head should be, there is a cluster of balloons. Her curse allows her to manipulate the minds of people. She can also place balloons on people that cause their happiness to grow, until it reaches its peak. At that point, the person dies. It is revealed near the end that Toya was a little girl from a very poor family. One day, she and her parents suddenly went to an amusement park for a fun day before they committed suicide. As a result, Toya views death as happiness. She eventually questions herself about her happiness, causing her own balloon to pop and kill her.
Her manga original has a background largely consistent with that of her anime counterpart except for the exact circumstance of her mortal death, which is left ambiguous (Hazama, for example, is completely unconvinced that her parents actually committed suicide after murdering her). She is not involved in much fighting until after Kohaku Hoshimura resurfaces and starts hunting down the Seven Stars. With only herself, Hazama, and Hokuto still remaining and all of them badly maimed, she allows herself to be consumed by Hazama in Chapter 86 in order to restore the latter's strength.
Kowaku (湖惑)
Voiced by: Yuki Hayashi (Japanese); Bob Carter (English)
He wears a white robe, a yellow vest and pants, and a large ball necklace. He is able to transform his body into a purplish gas so his weakness of a brain is not apparent.^{Ep 11, 12} The 4th star of the group in the television series, replacing Izuwa. At the end off the first season of the anime television series, he gets the zadan technique Lotus Flower from Akasha, but he is eventually killed by Makina Hoshimura when she finds and the destroys the necklace ball that houses his brain.^{Ep. 12}

=== Other characters ===
Kohaku Hoshimura (星村黒白, Hoshimura Kohaku)
Twin brother of Makina Hoshimura. Talented to the point of attaining the rank of Sojo at an age of 5, Kougon Sect had high hope that he would one day become Dai Sojo as an adult until the Seven Stars massacred the Hoshimura Clan, with him thought to have died along with the rest of his family. He resurfaced before Makina after the defeat of Sugami Maen, however, taking over Kougon Sect with the agenda of ending the use and existence of Shikabane Himes.
Riko (理子)
Voiced by: Yui Horie (Japanese); Stephanie Young (English)
Riko is the director and matron of the Dai-Rin House, the temple orphanage where Ouri and Keisei grew up.^{Ep. 1}
Mizuki Inuhiko (犬彦瑞樹, Inuhiko Mizuki)
Voiced by: Fuyuka Oura (Japanese); Clarine Harp (English)
Ouri's classmate and friend who is a girl. She is serious and observant, and is involved in the student council where she aspires to become president next year. She often physically hits Hiroshige Ushijima whenever he acts girl-crazy. She is often seen with something in her mouth resembling a cigarette.^{Ep. 1, 3, 4}
Hiroshige Ushijima (牛島尋維, Ushijima Hiroshige)
Voiced by: Tooru Nara (Japanese); Micah Solusod (English)
Ouri's classmate and friend who openly expresses his love for girls.^{Ep. 1, 4, 5, 9}
Sumitori (墨鳥)
Voiced by: Masayuki Shouji (Japanese); Sean Michael Teague (English)
Ouri's classmate and friend. He is very innocent and oblivious to the world of Shikabane.^{Ep. 1, 7} He is on the kendo team.^{Ep. 3}
Black Cat (ブラックキャット, Burakku Kyatto)
Voiced by: Yui Horie (Japanese); Greg Ayres (English)
A mysterious black cat spirit that appears only to Ouri to talk to him and to beckon him to follow it, leading to his encounters with the Shikabane and Makina.^{Ep. 1-4} The cat resembles a pet kitten that Ouri cherished as a child which died after being hit by a vehicle. Makina is also able to see the cat. In later episodes, the cat reveals itself to be harboring multiple souls.^{Ep. 9} In Chapter 91 of the manga it is revealed that the cat was made up of 11 children who Ouri's mother had kidnapped trying to fulfill her attachment to this world: to hold her child in her hands. Resentful that they were taken from their own mothers and that Ouri survived while they didn't, they originally planned to slowly compel Ouri to give up everything he holds dear one by one but are eventually able to reconcile with the fact that Ouri, unable to comprehend anything that had transpired at the time and then abandoned by his Shikabane mother once he grew past the toddler stage, is just as much of a victim as they are. After Ouri expresses his desire to embrace them, they forgive him and transfer their power to Ouri, having found salvation and passing on afterwards.
Its anime characterization, who also narrates the anime next episode previews, remains largely consistent with its manga portrayal. Near the end of the series, the cat reveals its true nature with the help of a foe Shikabane who was once a fellow orphan along with Ouri. Later, the cat is revealed as a metaphor for Ouri actually being part Shikibane himself. It is not known how he became this way, but that after transforming into a Shikibane after realizing this, the separate entity that his subconscious had become, eventually fades away as well.
Nozomi Kasuga (春日 望, Kasuga Nozomi)
Voiced by: Miki Maruyama (Japanese); Tia Ballard (English)
A classmate of Ouri, nicknamed Omune-sama or "Breast Goddess". In the first chapter of the manga she and a few other students visit a "man-eating house" where she is attacked and injured by a group of robbers-turned Shikabanes. (Note: In the anime series, Nozomi and the students visit a haunted abandoned building and face a corpse that has money on it that turns into a monster.^{Ep. 9}) She is saved by Makina, and since then she has developed a fascination with her and death.^{Ep. 9} In the anime, she is manipulated by Toya because they both thought death was beautiful. Toya's power transforms Kasuga, causing her to become more direct and eventually lead her to kill people at her school, until Ouri and Makina stopped her and Toya. However, they were unable to save Kasuga's life. With her last breath, she asked Ouri to make her into a Shikabane Hime. Her last wish goes unfulfilled as she didn't meet the requirements.
Her manga original, in contrast, never met Toya but ends up captured during the fall of Kougon Sect headquarters and force fed a parasite that is in the process of corrupting her brain when she is rescued by Ouri. Unable to save her conventionally but unwilling to put her further in harms way by turning her into a Shikabane Hime (conversion to which this version can undergo), Ouri asks his telekinesis-capable ally to remove the parasite directly. The removal of the parasite, while successful, is implied to have caused trauma to her brain and left her without any memory of Ouri. She is shown to be recovering from her wounds but otherwise living a normal life in the manga's epilogue.

== Terminology ==
Shikabane (屍(しかばね))
Sometimes referred to as Corpses. When a person dies with a powerful regret or obsession, they may become a Shikabane. As a Shikabane, they are undead but retain some degree of memory and intelligence. They may appear to be human but often transform into monsters. Shikabane are given superhuman strength and a unique ability or attribute called a Curse. Shikabane have no feeling towards the living and tend to kill them as driven by their regret or obsession. A Shikabane can be killed by destroying their brains or inflicting damage faster than they can regenerate^{Ep. 13}, and most that do not have any particularly-strong motivation tend to degenerate over a period of seven to eight years, at the end of which their obsessions become all but forgotten and the undead themselves thus cease to exist.
Shikabane Hime (屍姫(しかばね ひめ))
Shikabane Hime are Shikabane that follow the Kougon Sect and chose to reject their regrets and obsessions. So far they appear to have been young girls/women in their previous lives, and retain this human form. Each of them is partnered with a monk, who provides them with life energy called Rune (霊気) that allows them to heal their wounds and regenerate.^{Ep. 4, 13} In exchange, the Shikabane Hime protect their partner. Their mission is to hunt and kill rogue Shikabane. Once they destroy 108 Shikabane, they fulfill their contract and can supposedly go to Heaven. Outside of Akira who was somehow granted an exception, they are not allowed to kill humans. If their partner monk dies and a replacement is not forthcoming, however, the Shikabane Hime usually die or become a rogue Shikabane.^{Ep. 8, 13}
Contracted Monk (契約僧)
Contracted Monks are the soldier monks in the Kougon Sect. They provide their life energy called Rune to their Shikabane Hime which helps her heal in battle. They also support her during battles. The one who unifies the contracted monks in their district is known as a Guardian (守護).^{Ep. 13}
Sojo (僧正)
The Kougon Sect has several named positions, with Dai Sojo (大僧正) (currently Kamiu) at the very top and Gon Dai Sojo (権大僧正) (currently Shiou) as second in command. The Six Sojo (六僧正) head each of the districts. The position ranks after that are: Gon Sojo (権僧正) (such as Rika Aragami), Sho Sojo (少僧正) (such as Takamasa Sougi), Gon Sho Sojo (権少僧正), and Dai Sozu (大僧都) (such as Shuuji Isaki).^{Ep. 4-7,13} Keisei was promoted from Sho Sojo to Gon Sojo when he died in the line of duty.^{Ep. 13} Genpaku, such as Takamasa Sougi, also travel to the different Sect's districts;^{Ep. 4-7}
Curse (性(さが), Saga)
A Curse is a unique power that a Shikabane possess. Generally, it has something to do with their obsession or regret. Some Shikabane have very strong Curses that are not easily defeated by the Shikabane Hime or the Monks.^{Ep. 7}
Inspector (監査官長)
A monk who acts as support for Contracted Monks. They usually do not have a contract of their own.^{Ep. 1} They are also in charge of funeral arrangements of martyred monks.^{Ep. 13}
Shuhou (修法(しゅほう)) and Shujou (衆生(しゅじょう)) factions
Two factions within the Kougon sect that have different views on achieving salvation. The Shuhou faction believes in actively purging evil from the world of the living, allowing Human beings to naturally attain Nirvana, and employs Shikabane Himes to that end; meanwhile the Shujou faction is focused on devotion to spiritual enlightenment, seeking to attain Nirvana and to outright escape from incarnations into the world of the living as quickly as possible, and does not like the use of Shikabane Himes due to collectively viewing them as beneath Humanity.^{Ep. 11}

== Media ==
=== Manga ===
The manga was serialized in Japan from April 12, 2005, to August 12, 2014 in Monthly Shōnen Gangan. Individual chapters have been collected and published tankōbon volumes by Square Enix. The first volume was released on August 22, 2005; as of November 2014, twenty-three volumes have been released. A limited-edition version of volume 17 including a drama CD was released in April 2012. Yen Press announced during their Anime Expo 2015 panel that they have licensed the manga in a digital format.

| No. | Original release date | Original ISBN | English release date | English ISBN |
|---|---|---|---|---|
| 1 | August 22, 2005 | 4-7575-1506-5 | October 27, 2015 | 978-0-316-35469-1 |
| 2 | February 22, 2006 | 4-7575-1626-6 | December 29, 2015 | 978-0-316-35471-4 |
| 3 | August 22, 2006 | 4-7575-1738-6 | February 23, 2016 | 978-0-316-39309-6 |
| 4 | December 22, 2006 | 4-7575-1824-2 | April 26, 2016 | 978-0-316-39312-6 |
| 5 | May 22, 2007 | 978-4-7575-2016-5 | June 28, 2016 | 978-0-316-39314-0 |
| 6 | October 22, 2007 | 978-4-7575-2134-6 | August 30, 2016 | 978-0-316-35711-1 |
| 7 | February 22, 2008 | 978-4-7575-2220-6 | October 25, 2016 | 978-0-316-35713-5 |
| 8 | June 21, 2008 | 978-4-7575-2301-2 | December 20, 2016 | 978-0-316-36177-4 |
| 9 | September 22, 2008 | 978-4-7575-2379-1 | February 28, 2017 | 978-0-316-36179-8 |
| 10 | January 22, 2009 | 978-4-7575-2472-9 | April 25, 2017 | 978-0-316-36180-4 |
| 11 | July 22, 2009 | 978-4-7575-2605-1 | June 27, 2017 | 978-0-316-36181-1 |
| 12 | January 22, 2010 | 978-4-7575-2777-5 | August 29, 2017 | 978-0-316-36182-8 |
| 13 | July 22, 2010 | 978-4-7575-2933-5 | October 31, 2017 | 978-0-316-55268-4 |
| 14 | December 22, 2010 | 978-4-7575-3084-3 | December 26, 2017 | 978-0-316-55270-7 |
| 15 | June 22, 2011 | 978-4-7575-3250-2 | February 27, 2018 | 978-0-316-55271-4 |
| 16 | November 22, 2011 | 978-4-7575-3386-8 | April 24, 2018 | 978-0-316-55310-0 |
| 17 | April 21, 2012 | 978-4-7575-3549-7; 978-4-7575-3499-5 (SE) | June 26, 2018 | 978-0-316-55311-7 |
| 18 | October 22, 2012 | 978-4-7575-3723-1 | August 28, 2018 | 978-0-316-55312-4 |
| 19 | April 22, 2013 | 978-4-7575-3937-2 | October 30, 2018 | 978-1-9753-2707-1 |
| 20 | October 22, 2013 | 978-4-7575-4032-3 | November 12, 2018 | 978-1-9753-2820-7 |
| 21 | March 22, 2014 | 978-4-7575-4240-2 | February 26, 2019 | 978-1-9753-2822-1 |
| 22 | August 22, 2014 | 978-4-7575-4386-7 | April 30, 2019 | 978-1-9753-2824-5 |
| 23 | November 22, 2014 | 978-4-7575-4468-0 | June 25, 2019 | 978-1-9753-2826-9 |

=== Anime ===
Produced by Feel and Gainax, Shikabane Hime: Aka (屍姫 赫, Corpse Princess: Red) is a thirteen episode anime adaptation of the manga series. It premiered in Japan on AT-X on October 2, 2008. The episodes also air on BS11, Chiba TV, KBS Kyoto, Sun TV, Tokyo MX, TV Aichi, TV Kanagawa and TV Saitama. The opening and ending themes, "Beautiful fighter" and "My story", had a single release from angela on November 12, 2008.

The series is licensed for North American distribution and release by Funimation Entertainment which is releasing the series as Shikabane Hime. On October 24, 2008, the thirteen episodes began airing online with English subtitles through Funimation's official YouTube, Joost, and Hulu.com channels, with higher end downloadable versions released on the company's own website. Funimation noted that they hope this relatively quick release through online means will help prevent piracy. Traditionally, according to the president of Funimation Entertainment Gen Fukunaga, "by the time a licensing deal is signed to bring a series from Japan to the U.S. the episodes are already available as illegal downloads." On January 18, 2011, British anime distributor Manga Entertainment announced that they will release the first season Aka, on DVD in 2011.

A second season, titled Shikabane Hime: Kuro (屍姫 玄, Corpse Princess: Black), aired in Japan between January and March 2009. Episode 26 of the series, or Kuro 13, was released as a DVD only episode in August 2009.
