= Strait Jacket =

Japanese light novel series

- Cover art for the first light novel

ストレイト・ジャケット (Sutoreito Jaketto)
- Light novel
- Written by: Ichirō Sakaki
- Illustrated by: Yō Fujishiro
- Published by: Fujimi Shobo
- Imprint: Fujimi Fantasia Bunko
- Original run: August 20, 2000 – September 18, 2010
- Volumes: 11 + 3 extra
- Original video animation
- Directed by: Shinji Ushiro
- Produced by: Tomoko Kawasaki; Michiyoshi Koyama
- Written by: Ichirō Sakaki
- Music by: Takeshi Yanagawa
- Studio: Feel
- Licensed by: NA: Manga Entertainment
- Released: November 26, 2007 – April 28, 2008
- Runtime: 26–27 minutes
- Episodes: 3

Strait Jacket (ストレイト・ジャケット, Sutoreito Jaketto) is a light novel series by Ichirō Sakaki with illustrations by Yō Fujishiro, published by Fujimi Shobo under their Fujimi Fantasia Bunko imprint. It was published in 11 volumes between 2000 and 2010. The series was adapted into a 3-episode original video animation series in 2007. A film version of the OVA aired in the United States on the Syfy channel.

== Plot ==
Strait Jacket is set an alternate history where magic was proven to exist in the year 1899. The use of sorcery spread throughout all facets of society and changed the social and technological development of the world. The location is Tristan, an urban metropolis that appears to be an amalgamation of turn-of-the-20th-century Tokyo, San Francisco, and Victorian-era London.

Alongside this technology and science exists magic, which has been proven possible in public demonstrations by Dr. George Greco. Although the use of magic is only possible for a few talented individuals, it is very dangerous and highly illegal. Due to an invisible contaminant called the "malediction", or simply the "curse", people who use magic too often are at risk in transforming into "Demons", or horrific, malevolent abominations of nature that become immune to ordinary weapons. The Magic Administration Bureau, also known as the Sorcery Management Bureau, is set up in the attempt to safely explore the nature of magic, officially document it, attempt to provide rational scientific explanation for it, regulate its use and police those who use magic illegally. Magic, utilized in a safe sense by the Bureau, has been used as a viable energy source by the civil service, industry, agriculture, medicine, and the military. Effectively, the Magic Administration Bureau is now in control of every field and every facet of society.

The primary enemies of the Bureau are Oddman, a former left-wing terrorist cell, turned mercenary. All of these magic users, even the ones with innocent and well-meaning intentions, are in danger of tapping into the dark side either accidentally or on purpose and themselves becoming bloodthirsty beasts due to accidents or sabotage by Oddman's agents. These Sorcerist agents wear a suit of armor that resists the negative transforming effects of magic. These suits are referred to as "Mold Armor", or more commonly a "straitjacket", due to the fact they constrain human beings in their natural form. The Sorcerists also use magically tainted bullets from large hand-carried railguns powered by a combination of steam and magic, which are the only weapons capable of effectively stopping the magically transformed monsters.

However, the over-stretched Bureau is steadily losing ground and increasingly must rely on outside help. There simply aren't enough Sorcerists to fight the Demons caused by Oddman's sabotage. This leads to an increase in accidental demonic transformations and attacks on the public across Tristan. Among those who fight the Demons is an unlicensed, rogue Sorcerist named Leiot Steinberg, who is viewed as a loose cannon bringing the name of Sorcerists into disrepute and causing as much damage as the Demons in his one-man war against them. Yet the Bureau is forced to reluctantly call upon his services in their losing battle. Because Steinberg fights against a sin he committed long ago, even with his Mold Armor he comes closer and closer to transforming into a Demon every time he casts a spell.

== Characters ==
Character	Japanese voice actor	English voice actor
Leiot Steinberg (レイオット・スタインバーグ)	Shin-ichiro Miki	Steve Blum
Kapelteta Fernandez (カペルテータ・フェルナンデス)	Kei Shindo	Lara Jill Miller
Nerin Simmons (ネリン・シモンズ)	Ai Maeda	Bridget Hoffman
Jack Roland (ジャック・ローランド)	Tatsuya Kobashi	Keith Silverstein
Filisis Moog (フィリシス・ムーグ)	Mayumi Asano	Tara Platt
Brian Meno Moderato (ブライアン・メノ・モデラート)	Koji Ishii	Paul St. Peter
Isaac Hammond (アイザック・ハモンド)	Akira Sasanuma	Crispin Freeman
Rachel Hammond (レイチェル・ハモンド)	Asami Imai	Kari Wahlgren
Falk	Hiroaki Hirata	Christopher Smith
Reegs	Kenji Nomura	Jamieson Price
George Thomson	Jin Domon	Kirk Thornton
Fahgo	Yoshikazu Nagano	Doug Stone
Minea		Mela Lee
Gray		Dan Woren

== Media ==
=== Light novels ===
The Strait Jacket was written by Ichirō Sakaki with illustrations by Yō Fujishiro. The light novel series was published by Fujimi Shobo in 11 volumes between 2000 and 2010.

No.	Title	Release date	ISBN
1	Ningen no Katachi ~THE MOLD~; Form of Humanity -The Mold- (ツミビトのキオク～THE MOLD～)	August 20, 2000	4829129867
2	Ningen no Katachi ~THE ATTACHMENT~; Memory of Sinners -The Attachment- (ニンゲンのカタチ～THE ATTACHMENT～)	April 2001	4829113456
3	Omoide no sumika ~THE REGRET/FIRST HALF~; Habitat of memories -The Regret/First Half- (オモイデのスミカ～THE REGRET/FIRST HALF～)	January 2002	482911407X
4	Omoide no kanata ~THE REGRET/SECOND HALF~; Memories of Kanata -The Regret/Second Half- (オモイデのカナタ～THE REGRET/SECOND HALF～)	April 2002	4829114274
5	Yowamushi no Yaiba ~THE EDGE~; Wimpy Yaiba -The Edge- (ヨワムシのヤイバ～THE EDGE～)	January 2003	4829114916
6	Rakuen no sadame ~THE MIRAGE~; Provisions of Paradise -The Mirage- (ラクエンのサダメ～THE MIRAGE～)	March 2004	4829115955
7	Ikenie no hitsuji ~THE SACRIFICE 1st. HALF~; Sheep Sacrifice -The Sacrifice 1st. Half- (イケニエのヒツジ～THE SACRIFICE 1st. HALF～)	March 2006	4829117974
8	Ikenie no ronri ~THE SACRIFICE 2nd. HALF~; Logic Sacrifice -The Sacrifice 2nd. Half- (イケニエのロンリ～THE SACRIFICE 2nd．HALF～)	April 20, 2006	4829118148
9	Sekigan no akuma ~THE FIEND~; Devil of Sekigan -The Fiend- (セキガンのアクマ~THE FIEND~)	October 20, 2008	4829133465
10	Ningen No Owari ~THE DEATH BELL 1st. HALF~; The End of the Human -The Death Bell 1st. Half- (ニンゲンのオワリ～THE DEATH BELL 1st. HALF～)	November 20, 2009	4829134607
11	Ningen No Ashita ~THE DEATH BELL 2nd. HALF~; The Future of the Human -The Death Bell 2nd. Half- (ニンゲンのアシタ～THE DEATH BELL 2nd．HALF～)	September 18, 2010	4829135654

=== Extra ===
No.	Title	Release date	ISBN
1	Tomogara no En ~THE RELATION~; Tomogara no En -THE RELATION- (トモガラのエン～THE RELATION〜)	August 20, 2000	4829116684
2	Zetsubo no Hito ~THE DESPAIR~; Zetsubo no Hito -THE DESPAIR- (ゼツボウのヒト〜THE DESPAIR〜)	June 2007	4829119373
3	Tenrin no Saga ~THE GENIUS~; Tenrin no Saga -THE GENIUS- (テンリンのサガ〜THE GENIUS〜)	June 20, 2009	4829134127

=== OVA ===
In 2007 a three-episode original video animation based on the light novel was produced by Feel. The OVA series has been licensed for English-language translation and DVD release in the United States, Canada and the United Kingdom by Manga Entertainment. A film version was aired on the Sci-Fi Channel as part of their Ani-Monday programming block on October 20, 2008.

No.	Title	Original release date
1	"The Cast" (Japanese: ～ニンゲンのクビキ～)	November 25, 2007
2	"The Convicts" (Japanese: ～トガビトのキオク～)	January 27, 2008
3	"The Relief" (Japanese: ～ショクザイのミライ～)	April 28, 2008

== Reception ==
The light novel series currently has sold over half a million copies.
