= Bikini Warriors =

Japanese media franchise

- Bikini Warriors key visual

ビキニ・ウォリアーズ (Bikini Woriāzu)
- Genre: Fantasy comedy
- Anime television series
- Directed by: Naoyuki Kuzuya
- Produced by: Kenji Ebato; Ryūji Kasamatsu; Hiroaki Tsunoda
- Written by: Gō Tamai
- Music by: Miyabi Kanata (Primo)
- Studio: Feel; PRA
- Licensed by: AUS: Madman Entertainment; NA: Crunchyroll
- Original network: Tokyo MX, AT-X
- Original run: July 8, 2015 – September 23, 2015
- Episodes: 12 + 1 Special
- Original video animation
- Directed by: Naoyuki Kuzuya
- Produced by: Kenji Ebato; Ryūji Kasamatsu; Hiroaki Tsunoda (#1–3)
- Written by: Gō Tamai
- Music by: Miyabi Kanata (Primo)
- Studio: Feel; PRA
- Released: December 7, 2016 – May 17, 2021
- Runtime: 4 minutes
- Episodes: 6
- icon

Bikini Warriors (ビキニ・ウォリアーズ, Bikini Woriāzu) is a Japanese media franchise. It primarily consists of a series of fantasy figures created by Hobby Japan and Megahouse, featuring character designs from multiple artists including Rei Hiroe, Hisasi, Saitom and Tony. A 12-episode anime television series based on the setting aired from July to September 2015. A manga series and a video game have also been announced.

== Plot summary ==
The series consists of a sequence of short stories describing the (mis-)adventures of four female adventurers in a fantasy world teeming with dangerous monsters and hostile magicians. Clad in generously cut-out, yet effective bikini-type armor, the four women must learn to overcome the hazards of their world to meet their living expenses while at the same time trying to get comfortable with the idea of exposing too much of their curvaceous physiques.

== Characters ==
=== Main characters ===
Fighter (ファイター, Faitā)
Voiced by: Yoko Hikasa (Japanese); Felecia Angelle (English)
A redhaired, somewhat impulsive and stubborn woman, and the party's leader. She is also the daughter of a legendary warrior who saved the country in the past.
Paladin (パラディン, Paradin)
Voiced by: Kana Ueda (Japanese); Alexis Tipton (English)
A beautiful blonde woman who (most unbecoming to her vocation) harbors closeted sexual desires.
Mage (メイジ, Meiji)
Voiced by: Ai Kakuma (Japanese); Sarah Wiedenheft (English)
The youngest and most timid member of the adventure party, the Mage is a petite purple-haired girl skilled in the art of sorcery.
Dark Elf (ダークエルフ, Dākuerufu)
Voiced by: Chiaki Takahashi (Japanese); Dawn M. Bennett (English)
A member of the Dark Elf race who assists the party with a versatile combination of combat and magic-using skills. Initially quite haughty when she first joined, she has shed much of her attitude as the four of them have kept adventuring together.

=== Other characters ===
Hunter (ハンター, Hantā)
Voiced by: Manami Numakura (Japanese); Tia Ballard (English)
A survivalist with horrible cooking skills who becomes a very close partner of Valkyrie.
Valkyrie (ヴァルキリー, Varukirī)
Voiced by: Shizuka Itō (Japanese); Mallorie Rodak (English)
A lady of noble birth who has decided to dedicate her life to fighting evil. Valkyrie is very arrogant and tsundere in nature.
Cleric (クレリック, Kurerikku)
Voiced by: Aimi Tanaka
A petite-looking priestess of a war deity, whose specialty lies in combat-related magic at the expense of her clerical healing capacities.
Kunoichi (女忍, Menin)
Voiced by: Yumi Hara
A young female ninja who intends to steal all the bikini armor she can find in order to eventually get her hands on the most legendary bikini armor.
Black Knight (ブラックナイト, Burakku Naito)
Voiced by: Eri Kitamura
A very determined and strong fightress who likes to express herself with otherworldly (i.e., computer game–related) terms. She claims to have once been a school girl from Earth who fell into the fantasy world. However, despite her grimness, she is deathly afraid of the undead.
Necromancer (ネクロマンサー, Nekuromansā)
Voiced by: Akane Fujita
A demon-like, childish girl who can awake and control the dead with her magic, and even transform the living coming into contact with her into undead. A necro-fetishist, she wishes to attach herself to another girl, preferably Black Knight, and make them her zombie companion.

== Media ==
=== Anime ===
An anime television series based on the manga by studios Feel and PRA aired from July 8 to September 23, 2015. Madman Entertainment secured streaming rights in Australia & New Zealand, who simulcasted the series on AnimeLab. Funimation announced they had secured streaming rights within North America, and simulcasted the series on their service. Following Sony's acquisition of Crunchyroll, the series was moved to Crunchyroll.

==== Episode list ====
No.	Title	Original release date
1	"It's Not a Bikini If It's Armour" "Bikiniāmā wa bikiniāmādeatte bikinide wanai" (Japanese: ビキニアーマーはビキニアーマーであってビキニではない)	July 8, 2015
The heroines are introduced in a story in which they are sold scantily-cut bikini outfits, only to find to their surprise that they actually protect them far better than their old bikini outfits.
2	"A Quest Needs Money to Rest" "Yūsha no tabidachi ni wa dōshitemo hitsuyōna mono ga aru" (Japanese: 勇者の旅立ちにはどうしても必要なものがある)	July 15, 2015
A powerful king intends to hire the Bikini Warriors for a dangerous mission, but when he proves too avaricious and the heroines begin to haggle about their expedition's expenses, they end up thrown naked and tied up in bondage in the king's dungeon.
3	"Even Heroes Have Needs" "Yuusha to Iedomo Ikite Ikanakereba Naranai no de Aru" (Japanese: 勇者といえども生きていかなければならないのである)	July 22, 2015
With their funds completely drained, the Bikini Warriors abuse their hero status to strip the townsfolk of their possessions in order to have a comfortable time - only to have that scheme backfire on them in the end as an angry mob strips them naked and throws them into the woods.
4	"A Hero Needs No Reward" "Yuusha Taru Mono Mikaeri wo Motomete wa Ikenai" (Japanese: 勇者たるもの見返りを求めてはいけない)	July 29, 2015
In order to pass through a dangerous dungeon, the Bikini Warriors require a key in the possession of a town's mayor. To get that key, the Fighter must submit herself to a number of hazardous - and embarrassing - jobs, only to discover in the end that the "key" is not of a materialistic nature, compelling the Fighter to exact vengeance on her idealistic employer.
5	"Saving Things that Go Unused" "Itsuka tsukau to omotte iru mono wa daitai saigomade tsukawanai" (Japanese: いつか使うと思っているモノはだいたい最後まで使わない)	August 5, 2015
In order to purchase a magical crystal staff they need to defeat a dangerous dungeon monster, the Bikini Warriors decide to sell all the possessions they think they no longer need, such as their old armor and supply of healing elixirs. However, eventually they find out that doing so was a very bad idea. Exhausted and with no means of healing, they find the same staff they just bought in a treasure chest, meaning they sold their stuff for nothing.
6	"Heroes Overcome the Impossible" "Yūsha to wa genkai ni idomi, sore o koeru monodearu" (Japanese: 勇者とは限界に挑み、それを超える者である)	August 12, 2015
The Bikini Warriors seek out and fight a dangerous woman-hunting monster in the woods, in conjunction with a lot of strategically implemented optical censoring.
7	"Allies from Taverns May Disappoint" "Sakaba de deatta nakama ni kadona kitai o suru no wa kinmotsu" (Japanese: 酒場で出会った仲間に過度な期待をするのは禁物)	August 19, 2015
As the Bikini Warriors search for new members to reinforce their party, they reminisce about the time when the Dark Elf had first joined them, only for her haughtiness producing mixed results for her new teammates.
8	"Every Journey Finds New Friends" "Bōken no nakaba ni aratana nakama ga kuwawaru koto wa yoku aru hanashi" (Japanese: 冒険の半ばに新たな仲間が加わることはよくある話)	August 26, 2015
The Hunter and the Valkyrie are introduced competing to join the Bikini Warriors, only to end up as extremely close friends.
9	"A Hero Betrayed Has But One Choice" "Shinrai shite ita nakama no uragiri ni saishite yūsha no torubeki kōdō" (Japanese: 信頼していた仲間の裏切りに際して勇者の取るべき行動)	September 2, 2015
The Bikini Warriors kill an evil magician, but with his dying curse, the sorcerer takes control of Mage's body, forcing her to attack her teammates while still remaining conscious about her deeds, but unable to protest her innocence. As a result, she is killed by her misunderstanding fellow warriors. Mage's ghost struggles to resist the angels that come to take her to Heaven and tells her friends she can be resurrected at the Church; she is shown alive again in later episodes, indicating that her friends did revive her.
10	"You Don't Always Get What You Want or Need" "Hoshī to negau aitemu koso nakanaka te ni hairanai" (Japanese: 欲しいと願うアイテムこそなかなか手に入らない)	September 9, 2015
The Bikini Warriors are delving through a hazardous dungeon, but despite their great expectations, all treasure chests they come upon hold nothing but traps. When they finally get the chance to win a great idealistic reward, they promptly blow it in their disappointment.
11	"A Snare to Trap a Pure Maiden" "Seikishi no shiroki yawahada ni semaru jūyoku no wana" (Japanese: 聖騎士の白き柔肌に迫る獣欲の罠)	September 16, 2015
This episode deals with the self-sacrificial and closeted lascivious nature of Paladin, who is willing to marry a lecherous mayor in order to aid her teammate's progress. Before he can force her to sleep with him, the others barge in and beat him up, allowing them to progress anyway.
12	"No One Knows the End" "Hatashite hontōni kore de owaru no ka wa wareware ni mo mada wakaranai" (Japanese: 果たして本当にこれで終わるのかは我々にもまだ分からない)	September 23, 2015
This episode is a non-sequential, trailer-like collection of clips within a world-saving frame story, featuring the Bikini Warriors in several intimate personal moments and the additional company of Hunter and Valkyrie.
OVA	"To Provide Things that You Cannot See" "Kōnyū shite itadaita katagata no tame ni fudan mi rarenai mono o teikyō suru no wa tōzen no kotodearu" (Japanese: 購入して頂いた方々のために普段見られないモノを提供するのは当然のことである)	December 19, 2015 (BD/DVD release)
The Bikini Warriors succeed in slaying an evil sorcerer, but as his life ebbs away, the sorcerer casts a final curse which forces Fighter and Dark Elf to sexually assault their teammates in full view of an entire village. Mage snaps them out of it and they apologize, but the perverted Paladin goes to the sorcerer's corpse and begs him to cast the curse on her as well.
OVA	"Kunoichi Ninja Arts Chapter: The Drip Honey Secret" "Kunoichi ninpō jō himi no shitatari" (Japanese: クノイチ忍法帖 秘蜜のしたたり)	December 7, 2016 (BD/DVD release)
Hunter and Valkyrie stay in an inn with a girl named Cleric, but in the middle of the night the three roommates are attacked by a Kunoichi whose goal is to steal their bikini armor. The Kunoichi and Cleric start a fight in which Hunter and Valkyrie get entangled as collateral damage. Kunoichi is defeated, but much to the chagrin of the owner the room ends up totally demolished.
OVA	"The Story of the Warriors Who Got the Legendary Armour" "Kore ga densetsu no bōgu o teniireta yūsha-tachi no sugatadearu" (Japanese: これが伝説の防具を手に入れた勇者たちの姿である)	December 7, 2016 (BD/DVD release)
After braving many dangers, the Bikini Warriors encounter a deity who strips them of all their garments, claiming that it has granted them a legendary type of bikini armor which only "idiots" cannot see. Strutting around in the nude, the women start displaying their "new armor" until the reactions (both scandalized and lusting) of their environment gradually tell them otherwise. Meanwhile, Kunoichi, who believes the armor is real, asks the deity for the same boon; it makes her clothing disappear as well.
OVA	"I Tried to Visualize the Charm That Can Not be Fully Explained by Figures" "Figyuade wa setsumei dekinai miryoku o shikaku-ka shite mimashita" (Japanese: フィギュアでは説明できない魅力を視覚化してみました)	December 15, 2017 (BD/DVD release)
Kunoichi joined Hunter, Valkyrie, and Cleric. They defeat a demon, who warns them not to harm a crystal it was guarding, but Cleric smashes it anyway, making an explosion that wipes out a country. The group is arrested for it and thrown in a dungeon naked and tied up in bondage.
OVA	"There Are Always Absurd Events Befalling the Adventurers" "Bōken-sha ni furikakaru fujōrina dekigoto wa tsuneni arimasu" (Japanese: 冒険者に降りかかる不条理な出来事は常にあります)	July 27, 2018 (BD/DVD release)
The Bikini Warriors are challenged by Black Knight and Necromancer. Black Knight fantasizes about sex with Fighter and Mage. They seemingly knock her out, but she rises again and says this will not end until they lose. Scared, they run away.
OVA	"Bikini of the Dead" "Shisha no bikini" (Japanese: 死者のビキニ)	July 27, 2018 (BD/DVD release)
Black Knight and Necromancer attack the Bikini Warriors again. Necromancer summons an army of undead cats and possesses Dark Elf with the spirit of a cat until Paladin dispels the spirits. Necromancer seemingly surrenders and looks up to Paladin as a big sister, but turns her into an undead and sics her on the others, forcing everyone, including Black Knight, to run.
OVA	"An Ordinary High School Girl Becomes a Black Knight in Another World and Aims for a Life of Debauchery" "Heibon'na mesukōsei ga i sekai de kuro kishi to natte hōtō jinsei o mezasu" (Japanese: 平凡な女子高生が異世界で黒騎士となって放蕩人生を目指す)	May 17, 2021 (BD/DVD release)
Black Knight and Necromancer attack the Bikini Warriors yet again. Black Knight decides to tell them her story despite them being uninterested. She was once an average school girl from Earth who fell through a portal into the fantasy world, losing all her clothes in the process. Demons captured her and after empowering, brainwashing, and molesting her, sent her out to spread terror and chaos. She recently broke free of the brainwashing and formed a partnership with Necromancer. After finishing her story, Black Knight is annoyed when Necromancer claims her story was made up before she and the Bikini Warriors fall asleep, leaving her ranting that selling the story could give them great profit.
