= Outbreak Company =

Japanese light novel and anime series

- Outbreak Company: Moeru Shinryakusha
- First tankōbon volume cover, featuring Myucel Foaran

アウトブレイク・カンパニー 萌える侵略者 (Autobureiku Kanpanī: Moeru Shinryakusha)
- Genre: Isekai, comedy, fantasy
- Light novel
- Written by: Ichirō Sakaki
- Illustrated by: Yūgen
- Published by: Kodansha
- English publisher: NA: J-Novel Club
- Imprint: Kodansha Ranobe Bunko
- Original run: December 2, 2011 – August 2, 2018
- Volumes: 18 + 2 specials
- Manga
- Written by: Ichirō Sakaki
- Illustrated by: Kiri Kajiya
- Published by: Kodansha
- Magazine: Good! Afternoon
- Original run: November 7, 2012 – November 7, 2014
- Volumes: 4
- Anime television series
- Directed by: Kei Oikawa
- Written by: Naruhisa Arakawa
- Music by: Keiji Inai
- Studio: Feel
- Licensed by: AUS: Madman Entertainment; NA: Sentai Filmworks; UK: MVM Entertainment
- Original network: TBS, MBS, CBC, BS-TBS
- Original run: October 3, 2013 – December 19, 2013
- Episodes: 12
- icon

Outbreak Company, known in Japan as Outbreak Company: Moeru Shinryakusha (Japanese: アウトブレイク・カンパニー 萌える侵略者, Hepburn: Autobureiku Kanpanī: Moeru Shinryakusha; lit. 'Outbreak Company: The Moe Invader'), is a Japanese light novel series written by Ichirō Sakaki, with illustrations by Yūgen. Kodansha published 18 volumes from December 2011 to August 2017. A manga adaptation by Kiri Kajiya was serialized in Kodansha's Good! Afternoon magazine. An anime television series adaptation by Feel aired between October and December 2013.

== Plot ==
Shinichi Kanou is a young secluded otaku who is offered a job thanks to his vast knowledge of anime, manga, and video games. However, just after meeting his new employer, he is kidnapped, awakening in an alternate world with a fantasy setup. Shinichi is then informed that he was in fact selected by the Japanese government to help improve his country's relations with this new world by establishing a company to spread the unique products of the Japanese anime culture to this new, unexplored market.

== Characters ==
Shinichi Kanou (加納 慎一, Kanō Shin'ichi)
Voiced by: Natsuki Hanae, Maaya Uchida (childhood) (Japanese); Tyler Galindo (English)
Shinichi is the protagonist. He is a hardcore high school aged otaku who is true and honest to his interests. Shinichi learned the hardships of being an otaku after confessing to his childhood friend, where she denied him, just because he was an otaku. He was so depressed, that he dropped out of school and became a NEET for a year, before his parents gave him a choice, rejoin society or be disowned. Having little choice, he looked for a job in order to escape the hikikomori lifestyle. He found a fishy job for otaku and took it and as a result he ends up employed in spreading otaku culture for the Holy Eldant Empire. Shinichi has romantic feelings for Myucel and confesses to her at the end of the series.
Myucel Foaran (ミュセル・フォアラン, Myuseru Foaran)
Voiced by: Suzuko Mimori (Japanese); Juliet Simmons (English)
Myucel is a half-elf who is Shinichi's maid in the Holy Eldant Empire. Due to her half-elf nature, she is disdained by both elves and humans as half-breeds like her are looked down upon. For that reason, Myucel often hides her elf ears. Having no discrimination at her origins, she then began showing them whilst in the mansion when Shinichi found out about her heritage and praised Myucel for it, calling them attractive instead of ridiculing her. Shinichi quickly befriends Myucel and starts teaching her the Japanese language. Myucel often thinks of herself as a lowly servant and often talks down about her self. However, Shinichi did not see Myucel for her class and treated her as an equal. In response to his kindness, Myucel eventually falls in love with him and becomes his most trusted supporter. She is a powerful mage who was trained in the military of the Holy Eldant Empire. She officially becomes his girlfriend and love interest, after he confesses to her at the end of the series.
Petralka Anne Eldant III (ペトラルカ・アン・エルダント三世, Petoraruka An Erudanto Sansei)
Voiced by: Mai Fuchigami (Japanese); Kira Vincent-Davis (English)
Petralka is sixteen years old despite her childlike appearance and is the monarch of the Holy Eldant Empire. She takes an interest in Shinichi after seeing how casually he speaks with her and after learning about otaku culture. Petralka starts visiting him on a regular basis to have him read manga for her which in turn causes her to develop deep feelings for him. Petralka usually complains at Myucel out of jealousy due to her closeness with Shinichi and how well she learned to speak and write in Japanese. Not wanting to fall behind a "lowly peasant", she asks him to teach her the Japanese language as well. Petralka usually demands attention from Shinichi, and only him. She tends to give Shinichi a leery look whenever he fawns over girls who are obviously much better endowed than she is and often assumes any request he asks of her must stem from a sexual motive.
Minori Koganuma (古賀沼 美埜里, Koganuma Minori)
Voiced by: Maaya Uchida (Japanese); Genevieve Simmons (English)
Minori is a well-endowed female member of the Japan Self-Defense Force (JSDF). She is another one of the ambassadors from Japan, assigned to serve as both a bodyguard and an advisor for Shinichi. She is part of the Japan Ground Self Defense Eastern Regiment First Engineering Group, ranked as first class there. She is assigned to help Shinichi with his task of spreading the otaku culture in the Holy Eldant Empire. Minori is also an otaku but unlike him, she is a fujoshi specialized in boys' love (BL) merchandise and usually fantasizes about Shinichi with Galius becoming a couple. For the sake of being recognized by her own father, she started training early in her childhood, attributing to her impressive battle prowess. This is also one of the reasons why she entered the JSDF. Minori is an accomplished fighter and is capable of defeating a group of armed vigilantes without the need of a weapon.
Elbia Hanaiman (エルビア・ハーナイマン, Erubia Hānaiman)
Voiced by: Sumire Uesaka (Japanese); Sara Ornelas (English)
Elbia is a werewolf who has large dog ears and a large chest. She was initially recruited by the neighboring Bahairam Kingdom to spy on the Holy Eldant Empire. She apologizes a lot more due to the fact that she constantly falls victim to her natural animalistic tendencies and causing trouble than any other reason. Elbia is a great artist and is able to sketch large-scaled castles and structures with ease. Elbia develops a crush on Shinichi after she is saved by him when she was captured and about to be executed. She is later entrusted as Shinichi's personal artist. During the full moon, Elbia has a tendency to forget herself and act much more doglike, like jumping on Shinichi and licking his face when she's happy or chasing a ball on all fours while barking. Elbia once attacked Shinichi at night while she was in heat because of it. She has a tendency to glomp Shinichi whenever he makes a statement about not minding her race.
Jinzaburou Matoba (的場 甚三郎, Matoba Jinzaburō)
Voiced by: Keiji Fujiwara (Japanese); Andy McAvin (English)
Matoba is a man from the Japanese government who hires Shinichi to the task of spreading the Japanese culture in the Holy Eldant Empire. However, he only reveals him the true nature of his mission after having him drugged and taken away from Earth.
Galius En Cordbal (ガリウス・エン・コルドバル, Gariusu En Korudobaru)
Voiced by: Shin-ichiro Miki (Japanese); Chris Patton (English)
Galius is Petralka's cousin, a knight and the captain of her guard. He is initially incredulous and dismissive of Shinichi's mission, but later warms up to him and comes around to enjoying it. His and Petralka's parents fought for the throne which ended with their mutual deaths, leaving Petralka to become a ruler despite being a child. Thanks to Minori's influence, Galius becomes interested in BL manga and developed interest in Shinichi.

== Media ==
=== Light novels ===
Outbreak Company is a light novel series written by Ichiro Sakaki, with illustrations by Yūgen. Kodansha published 18 volumes from December 2, 2011, to August 2, 2017, under their Kodansha Ranobe Bunko imprint. The novels are published in Taiwan by Sharp Point Press. North American online light novel publisher J-Novel Club have licensed the series.

| No. | Original release date | Original ISBN | English release date | English ISBN |
|---|---|---|---|---|
| 1 | December 2, 2011 | 978-4-06-375203-8 | November 17, 2017 | 978-1-71-830104-7 |
Prologue: Breakthrough; Ch. 1: Well, Whaddaya KnowーIt's Another World!; Ch. 2: The Royal Punch; Ch. 3: Liberté, Égalité, Fraternité; Ch. 4: Thy Name Is Invader
| 2 | December 28, 2011 | 978-4-06-375211-3 | February 2, 2018 | 978-1-71-830106-1 |
Ch. 1: Good Morning, Alternate World!; Ch. 2: The Beast-Spy; Ch. 3: Run Silent, Run Deep; Ch. 4: The Melancholy of an Invader; Ch. 5: Operation Assassination
| 3 | May 2, 2012 | 978-4-06-375237-3 | April 20, 2018 | 978-1-71-830108-5 |
Ch. 1: Yup, It's Another World; Ch. 2: Lunatic; Ch. 3: Soccer... Soccer?; Ch. 4: The Hero Stands upon the Field; Epilogue
| 4 | August 31, 2012 | 978-4-06-375255-7 | June 22, 2018 | 978-1-71-830110-8 |
Ch. 1: The Melancholy of an Empress; Ch. 2: Magical Girl; Ch. 3: The Party's Over; Ch. 4: No Business Like...
| 5 | November 30, 2012 | 978-4-06-375271-7 | September 7, 2018 | 978-1-71-830112-2 |
Ch. 1: Well, Whaddaya Know ー It's Another Country!; Ch. 2: The Country Called Bahairam; Ch. 3: Elvia and Amatena; Ch. 4: The Great Shinichi Rescue; Epilogue: Cultural Invasion Redux
| 6 | May 2, 2013 | 978-4-06-375306-6 | November 26, 2018 | 978-1-71-830114-6 |
Ch. 1: Do We Meet By Chance?; Ch. 2: A Trading-Card Strategy?; Ch. 3: Cornered?; Ch. 4: Only One Smart Move?
| 7 | August 30, 2013 | 978-4-06-375323-3 | January 28, 2019 | 978-1-71-830116-0 |
Ch. 1: What If She Wore a Swimsuit?; Ch. 2: Mother Arriveth; Ch. 3: Seven Rotten Days
| 8 | November 1, 2013 | 978-4-06-375337-0 | April 15, 2019 | 978-1-71-830118-4 |
Ch. 1: A Royal Replica?; Ch. 2: A Puppet Master?; Ch. 3: Her Own Rules?; Ch. 4: Vanishing Magic?
| 9 | February 28, 2014 | 978-4-06-375340-0 | June 16, 2019 | 978-1-71-830120-7 |
Ch. 1: A Novel, but... Light; Ch. 2: I'm... Going Home; Ch. 3: Hullo, Akiba!; Ch. 4: Schemes Are So Sudden
| 10 | May 5, 2014 | 978-4-06-375359-2 | August 18, 2019 | 978-1-71-830122-1 |
Ch. 1: This Just In: We're Under Attack!; Ch. 2: Operation Rescue Minori-san; Ch. 3: The Going Is Easy, but the Coming Home...; Yuugen Character Designs
| 11 | October 1, 2014 | 978-4-06-375360-8 | October 19, 2019 | 978-1-71-830124-5 |
Prologue; Ch. 1: Give a Shout when You Shoot; Ch. 2: More than Just a Palette Swap; Ch. 3: Is a Quiet Life Too Much to Ask?
| 12 | February 27, 2015 | 978-4-06-381443-9 | December 31, 2019 | 978-1-71-830126-9 |
Who Are These People?; Ch. 1: Marriage? Well, that Came Out of Left Field; Ch. 2: When G-----s Met Rubert; Ch. 3: The Great Honey Plot; Ch. 4: Love's Freedom
| 13 | July 31, 2015 | 978-4-06-381463-7 | March 28, 2020 | 978-1-71-830128-3 |
Prologue; Ch. 1: Look Who's Mr. Popular; Ch. 2: More Like HARMOR!; Ch. 3: Presumed Forbidden; PDWS X_{03}AD-F Iron Crab F
| 14 | December 2, 2015 | 978-4-06-381505-4 | June 8, 2020 | 978-1-71-830130-6 |
Who Are These People?; Ch. 1: Ama-no-Iwato?; Ch. 2: Chirudoren?; Ch. 3: Toransekusharu?
| 15 | July 1, 2016 | 978-4-06-381521-4 | November 14, 2020 | 978-1-71-830132-0 |
Ch. 1: The Calm Before the Storm?; Ch. 2: Go West, Amutech; Ch. 3: The Capital In Flames; Ch. 4: The Truth That Lies Beneath
| 16 | December 2, 2016 | 978-4-06-381552-8 | January 17, 2021 | 978-1-71-830134-4 |
Ch. 1: They've Got the Whole World In A... Pinch?; Ch. 2: When an Armor Meets an Armor Coming Through the Rye; Ch. 3: Fire? Fire!!; Epilogue
| 17 | March 31, 2017 | 978-4-06-381591-7 | April 4, 2021 | 978-1-71-830136-8 |
Prologue; Ch. 1: The Long Goodbye?; Ch. 2: Super-Dimension... Carrier?; Ch. 3: One Way or Another?
| 18 | August 2, 2017 | 978-4-06-381611-2 | June 14, 2021 | 978-1-71-830258-7 |
Prologue; Ch. 1: Uninvited Guests; Ch. 2: The Captive Empress; Ch. 3: The Rescue; Ch. 4: That Side and This Are Severed; Epilogue: The Power of Moe
| Gaiden | August 2, 2018 | 978-4-06-512948-7 | February 21, 2023 | 978-1-71-830328-7 |
A Letter; Ch. 1: Marrying Her Majesty; Ch. 2: Beauty and the Beast Girl; Ch. 3: Her Name Is Koganuma Minori; The Melancholy of Shinichi Kanou (by Yuugen)
| Spin-Off (嫁々) | November 2, 2018 | 978-4-06-513099-5 | — | — |
Ch. 1: The Bride raids 【嫁、襲来】; Ch. 2: The Brides 【嫁、増植】; Ch. 3: Partners in cohabitation 【嫁、同棲】; Ch. 4: Saboteurs from the beyond 【彼方よりの刺客】

=== Manga ===
A manga adaptation, illustrated by Kiri Kajiya, was serialized in Kodansha's Good! Afternoon magazine between November 7, 2012, and November 7, 2014. Kodansha published the series in four tankōbon volumes from September 2, 2013, to January 7, 2015.

| No. | Release date | ISBN |
|---|---|---|
| 1 | September 9, 2013 | 978-4-06-387916-2 |
Chapters 1-5
| 2 | October 7, 2013 | 978-4-06-387925-4 |
Chapters 6-11
| 3 | June 6, 2014 | 978-4-06-387975-9 |
Chapters 12-18
| 4 | January 7, 2015 | 978-4-06-388027-4 |
Chapters 19-25

=== Anime ===
An anime television series adaptation, produced by Feel and directed by Kei Oikawa, aired from October 3 to December 19, 2013, on TBS and later on MBS, CBC, and BS-TBS. The opening theme is "Univer Page" (ユニバーページ, Yunibā Pēji) by Suzuko Mimori and the ending theme is "Watashi no Hōsekibako" (私の宝石箱) by Mai Fuchigami.

The series was simulcast by Crunchyroll. Sentai Filmworks acquired the anime series for streaming and home video release, later releasing it on Blu-ray and DVD on March 3, 2015. After the acquisition of Crunchyroll by Sony Pictures Television, the series was removed from Crunchyroll on March 31, 2022.

| No. | Title | Original release date |
|---|---|---|
| 1 | "Awakening in the Other Realm" "Kigatsukeba Isekai" (気が付けば異世界) | October 3, 2013 |
Secluded otaku Shinichi Kanou passes a multiple choice job assessment test for the multimedia entertainment company Amutec, but he is drugged with a hot beverage during his interview with his employer Jinzaburou Matoba. When he wakes up in a bedroom inside a mansion, Shinichi meets half-elf maid Myucel Foaran and JSDF bodyguard Minori Koganuma, as he finds himself on the outskirts of Marinos, the capital city of the Holy Eldant Empire. After finding out that Matoba is a government official, Shinichi is briefed about a portal between Japan and the Holy Eldant Empire. Shinichi is tasked with spreading otaku culture to the locals. Later on, Shinichi begins teaching Myucel about the Japanese language as a token of their new friendship. Shinichi then meets Brooke Darwin, a giant blue lizardman who is the gardener. The next day, Minori escorts Shinichi to the castle in order to meet with the empress Petralka Anne Eldant III. Shinichi starts off on the wrong foot as he exclaims that Petralka is a little girl.
| 2 | "The Moe Help Desk" "Moeru Osewagakari" (萌えるお世話係) | October 10, 2013 |
Minori informs Shinichi about Petralka's chancellor Zaharl and Petralka's cousin and knight captain Galius En Cordbal. After Matoba tries to defuse the situation, Shinichi rebukes Galius for saying that otaku culture might be harmful or toxic. Impressed by this, Petralka fully supports Shinichi in his endeavors. After deciding to help Myucel study the Japanese language every night, Shinichi selects various otaku culture materials during the afternoon for several days. He has Myucel and Brooke sample some of these materials. Petralka pays a visit to Shinichi and forces him to read a manga, though Petralka becomes jealous when Shinichi gives special attention to Myucel. The next day, Minori and Brooke accompany Shinichi to the city, where the local signage uses simple pictures while the children are trained as soldiers. Later on, Shinichi stops Petralka from mistreating Myucel, explaining that freedom, philanthropy and equality are the basic principles of otaku culture. Pardoning Shinichi for his apparent misconduct, Petralka requests him to teach her about the Japanese language alongside Myucel. At night, Shinichi and Myucel discuss a manga about a moe relationship between a slave girl and an overlord.
| 3 | "You are an Invader" "Nanji no Na wa Shinryakusha" (汝の名は侵略者) | October 17, 2013 |
While a school which focuses on otaku culture is in the process of being constructed, Shinichi continues to help Petralka study the Japanese language. Petralka enjoys spending time with Shinichi until he mentions Myucel. Minori warns Shinichi that he is trying to establish an educational system that fundamentally rejects the very structure of the Holy Eldant Empire. At night, Myucel is able to have a rather stagnant conversation with Shinichi in the Japanese language. When the school finally opens, Petralka completes two kanji workbooks in an effort to impress Shinichi, but she becomes envious when he focuses more on Myucel's progress. Alessio, leader of the Patriotic Knights, suddenly captures Shinichi, Myucel, Minori and Petralka. They learn that the Patriotic Knights obtained an orb called the Exterminating Flame, which is capable of destroying the school. The Patriotic Knights are a minority anti-imperial organization with no financial or political influence. Shinichi, Myucel, Minori and Petralka collaborate to escape the clutches of the Patriotic Knights, whereas Shinichi uses a fire extinguisher to prevent Alessio from activating the Exterminating Flame. Myucel shields Petralka from being stabbed by Alessio, making Petralka extremely worried about Myucel.
| 4 | "Furry Spy" "Kemono na Supai" (ケモノなスパイ) | October 24, 2013 |
On the first day of class, Shinichi teaches the elf and dwarf students their first lesson about the Japanese language. One month later, Myucel is fully recovered after having been put on bed rest. During class, Shinichi and Minori teach about inappropriate fan service and boy's love terminology to the elf and dwarf students. Shinichi and Minori spot werewolf girl Elbia Hanaiman hiding in the bushes, though Elbia claims that she is a wandering artist. Elbia is imprisoned with possible execution after it is believed that she is a spy from the Bahairam Kingdom, an enemy of the Holy Eldant Empire. Shinichi, Myucel and Minori meet with Petralka, Galius and Zaharl at the castle. Shinichi explains that art plays a crucial role in otaku culture. Since he is denied taking custody of Elbia, Shinichi tries to prove her innocence, but his interrogations only raise more suspicions of her. After Shinichi convinces Petralka with the idea of having Elbia relay false information to the Bahairam Kingdom, Elbia is entrusted as Shinichi's personal artist.
| 5 | "This Really Is Another World" "Hontō ni Betsu no Sekai" (本当に別の世界) | October 31, 2013 |
It has been a few days since Elbia moved into the mansion. During class, Shinichi gives a lecture about the history of gal games, and he even samples one of them as an example. When he comes home, Shinichi helps Myucel with Elbia's laundry. During dinnertime, Shinichi notices that Elbia exhibits strange behavior when she confines herself in her bedroom. The next day, Shinichi and Minori stop a heated discussion between the elf and dwarf students during class. Shinichi begins to believe that Elbia might be an assassin sent to target him. At the castle, Petralka starts acting like a tsundere towards Shinichi, while Galius enjoys a boys' love manga that Minori lent him. Back at the mansion, Shinichi offers to take Myucel to Japan when he will be permitted to leave the Holy Eldant Empire. Late at night, Elbia pounces on Shinichi in his bed as his scream alerts Myucel and Minori. The confusion is cleared up when it is revealed that Elbia is in heat during a full moon.
| 6 | "Soccer... Soccer?" "Sakkā... Sakkā?" (サッカー……サッカー?) | November 7, 2013 |
Despite an ongoing dispute between elf student Loic Slayson and dwarf student Romilda Gardo still unresolved, Petralka does not allow Myucel to teach alongside Shinichi and Minori. After a golden soccer ball is found as part of a care package shipment of otaku culture materials, Shinichi decides to organize a friendly soccer match between the elf and dwarf students, convincing Petralka to approve of this. The following week, Romilda's team scores fifty goals against Loic's team during the first half of the match through unconventional means of prowess. At lunchtime, Shinichi makes up an etiquette of removing a rice grain from onigiri left on one's cheek before eating it. When Loic's team implements magic against Romilda's team during the second half of the match, this erupts into an all-out war. As the scores are tied at ninety-nine goals, Petralka and Elbia play as substitutes in a one-on-one match, in which Petralka manages to score a goal with Myucel's assistance. The elf and dwarf students all win a handheld game console since the match ended in a draw due to collateral damage.
| 7 | "Maid in Japan" "Meido in Japan" (メイド イン ジャパン) | November 14, 2013 |
Shinichi is granted repatriation for one day after complaining to Matoba about some purchasing errors of certain otaku culture materials. Once he is drugged and transported back to Japan, Shinichi realizes that Myucel hid inside a second duffel bag. While accompanying Shinichi to Akihabara by train, Myucel marvels at everything she sees. They spend the whole day exploring the area full of otaku culture, and they end up eating omurice at a maid café. Back in his bedroom at home, Shinichi suddenly gets nervous around Myucel when she offers to do chores for him. While Myucel takes a bath, Shinichi goes to the convenience store late at night in order to buy a change of underwear for Myucel. He rushes back home, and she dozes off while wearing his oversized T-shirt. Meanwhile, Galius and Zaharl try to stall Petralka from seeing Shinichi, but Petralka finds out that Shinichi took a trip to Japan. The next day, Shinichi returns to the Holy Eldant Empire, though Matoba berates Shinichi for forgetting to purchase the correct otaku culture materials. Shinichi comments that his trip was not a total loss as Myucel is shown making omurice for Elbia and Brooke.
| 8 | "The Melancholy of the Supreme Ruler" "Kōtei Heika no Yūutsu" (皇帝陛下の憂鬱) | November 21, 2013 |
Growing tired of her duties as empress, Petralka absconds from the castle. Shinichi finds her inside a crate in a storage room. The next day, Petralka confines herself in her bedroom, and Shinichi believes that she is becoming a shut-in. Minori and Matoba encourage Shinichi to fix the problem by himself. Shinichi learns that Petralka's parents were killed by Galius's parents when she was a child. Upon entering Petralka's bedroom, Shinichi shows Petralka the true lifestyle of a shut-in. They even recite the Shut-ins Allegiance Pledge. As Shinichi spends the night in the castle, he helps Petralka sneak past two Eldant soldiers in order to take a bath inside the spa. Meanwhile, Myucel stirs an empty pot as she waits for Shinichi to return to the mansion, while Minori, Elbia and Brooke are left to starve. Shinichi later tells Petralka how he became a former shut-in, mentioning all the melancholy that comes with it. When Petralka wonders if she is fit to be an empress, Shinichi tells Petralka that she should just be herself. The following day, Petralka finds the courage to exit her bedroom and resume her duties.
| 9 | "The Swimsuit Apocalypse" "Mizugi no Mokushiroku" (水着の黙示録) | November 28, 2013 |
It is shown that Myucel is now a teacher at the school. Since Minori is obligated to spend her accumulated paid leave time, Galius suggests that she should spend it at the imperial estate outside the capital. Shinichi decides to take Myucel, Minori and Elbia by the lake at the imperial estate in their swimsuits. Galius and Zaharl have arranged for Petralka to visit the imperial estate in the afternoon when she is done with paperwork, but Zaharl's scholars have trouble selecting the perfect swimsuit for Petralka. While Shinichi, Myucel, Minori and Elbia enjoy some onigiri, Loic alerts them that Romilda was tased in the bushes. After it is learned that three furry creatures are lurking in the bushes, Loic looks after Romilda, while Elbia is caught in a booby trap. Myucel is eventually captured by one furry creature after she catches the other two. When Shinichi rushes to save Myucel, Minori then realizes that the furry creatures are actually three JSDF soldiers in ghillie suits secretly snapping photos of Myucel, Minori and Elbia in their swimsuits. In the afternoon, Zaharl's scholars select a one-piece swimsuit for Petralka, who is very happy to wear it.
| 10 | "Magical Girl Petralka" "Mahō Shōjo Petoraruka" (魔法少女ペトラルカ) | December 5, 2013 |
After Myucel accidentally spills vichyssoise on Minori's clothes, Minori is forced to borrow one of Myucel's maid outfits. Matoba informs Shinichi and Minori that there is an internet leak of footage from the friendly soccer match. In order to keep the Holy Eldant Empire from being exposed to Japan, Shinichi devises a plan to produce a behind-the-scenes of a fantasy film. Minori is the director, while Petralka agrees to be cast as a magical girl. Guided by elf woman Luna to a dragon's lair, Minori agitates a red dragon by spraying on antiperspirant. Loic and Romilda are tasked with film editing after more scenes are filmed. As the last battle scene is being shot on location, the red dragon is agitated again by Minori's antiperspirant and wreaks havoc. The Eldant soldiers watch in horror as the JSDF soldiers chase away the red dragon with their artillery. Petralka kisses Shinichi on the cheek as gratitude for her leading role. During a test screening of the fantasy film, Petralka is embarrassed that her scenes turned out as bloopers. The fantasy film ends up being shelved due to plagiarism.
| 11 | "Plot Silent, Plot Deep" "Fukaku Shizuka ni Inbō Seyo" (深く静かに陰謀せよ) | December 12, 2013 |
Matoba informs Shinichi that the secret of the Holy Eldant Empire remains to be preserved. Shinichi notices that Elbia has changed the art style in her sketches, while elf student Edward Theodore Pertini has translated several light novels. Shinichi realizes that there is a shortage of otaku culture materials, which had led to various arguments among the elf and dwarf students. It is revealed that Matoba truly intended to stage an invasion based on otaku culture instead of military force. Minori explains that the Holy Eldant Empire is an unexplored territory for the JSDF. As Shinichi feels guilty for spreading otaku culture, Minori warns him what the government is capable of doing to a potential whistleblower. Matoba later informs Minori that Shinichi might need to be replaced. At night, Myucel makes several plates of omurice for Shinichi. After thanking him for influencing her life with otaku culture, she begs him to stay with her. The next day, Shinichi proposes an idea to Petralka of having otaku culture materials produced in the Holy Eldant Empire, which means that they will no longer need to rely on the JSDF. However, Matoba does not look so pleased by this.
| 12 | "Shoot the Invader!" "Shinryakusha o Ute!" (侵略者を撃て！) | December 19, 2013 |
After Petralka's personal maids manage to thwart the JSDF soldiers from ambushing Shinichi for his act of defiance, Matoba deeply apologizes to Petralka for the incident in deception. Myucel later looks out the window and sees smoke rising in the direction of the school, of which someone has committed arson by activating the Exterminating Flame. As Shinichi rushes to the school library, he is sedated with chloroform by two JSDF soldiers. Myucel, Elbia and Brooke arrive at the school to initiate a mission to rescue Shinichi. Defying Matoba's orders, Minori also arrives to assist the others. When Shinichi awakens, Matoba tells the others that the Holy Eldant Empire might sever diplomatic relations with Japan. On a video call, a politician threatens to extract Shinichi from the Holy Eldant Empire. With Petralka listening in on the conversation, she threatens to sever diplomatic relations with Japan in retaliation. At the castle, Matoba tells Shinichi that he can continue spreading otaku culture in the Holy Eldant Empire, but only with budget cuts. When the school reopens, Shinichi resumes teaching the elf and dwarf students.
