= Ichirō Sakaki =

Japanese writer (born 1969)

- Born: 23 November 1969 (age 56)
- Occupation: Writer

Ichirō Sakaki (榊 一郎, Sakaki Ichirō) is a Japanese writer. He writes light novels and manga.

== Works ==
- Scrapped Princess (light novel, 1999–2005; manga, 2002–2004)
- Strait Jacket (light novel, 2000–2010)
- Magician's Academy (light novel, 2003–2007; manga, 2006, 2008–2009)
- Shinkyoku Sōkai Polyphonica (light novel, Crimson (2006–2013), Crimson S (2008–2010), After School (2012–2013); Eiphonic Songbird (2012–2014); manga, 2007–2012)
- Code-E (manga, 2007–2008; light novel, 2008)
- Chaika - The Coffin Princess (light novel, 2010–2015; anime, 2014)
- Outbreak Company (light novel, 2011–2017; manga, 2012–2014; anime, 2013)
- Karakuri Onigami Akatsuki (light novel, 2013–2014)
- Blue Steel Blasphemer (light novel, 2015–2016)
- Paramilitary Company (light novel, 2017)
