= List of Shinkyoku Sōkai Polyphonica episodes =

T.O Entertainment adapted Shinkyoku Sōkai Polyphonica into a twelve episode anime series directed by Junichi Watanabe and Masami Shimoda and written by Ichiro Sakaki. On February 6, 2007, one month after the first manga adaptation was announced, the anime adaptation was announced. Broadcast on TBS, the series premiered on April 3, 2007, and aired weekly until its conclusion on June 19, 2007. The music was composed by Hikaru Nanase. Two pieces of theme music were used for the first. "Apocrypha" is performed by Eufonius as the opening theme. "Concordia" (コンコルディア, Konkorudia) is performed by Kukui as the ending theme.

Diomedea adapted the series into another season entitled Shinkyoku Sōkai Polyphonica Crimson S, directed by Toshimasa Suzuki and written by Ken'ichi Kanemaki, that is not a continuation of the first season but a prequel to it and will tie into Ichiro Sakaki and Noboru Kannatsuki's light novel adaptation of the same name. The official website was launched on November 11, 2008, and began streaming a promotional video on March 23, 2009, featuring the anime's opening theme but contained no actual anime footage. The series premiered on TVK and TV Saitama on March 4, 2009, and is currently broadcasting weekly. The series was also broadcast on AT-X, Gifu Broadcasting, MBS, and Mie TV. The music is directed by Jin Aketagawa and composed by Magic Capsule. Two pieces of theme music were used for the second season. "Phosphorous" is performed by eufonius as the opening theme. Koi no Uta (こいのうた) is performed by Haruka Tomatsu as ending theme.

== Shinkyoku Sōkai Polyphonica ==
No.	Title	Directed by	Written by	Original release date
1	"Prelude: The Crimson Spirit"; Transliteration: "Pureryūdo - Aka no Seirei" (Japanese: プレリュード 紅の精霊)	Michita Shiraishi	Ichiro Sasaki	April 3, 2007
While getting his motorbike fixed, Phoron and Corticarte decide to tour the town. They see a girl sitting on a bench in a park looking puzzled, and Phoron decides to approach her. The girl, Misaki, wonders if she should get her grandmother's memento from the house where she used to live before she died. Phoron and Corticarte encourage Misaki to get it, but they later discover that the house is going to be demolished and must rush to rescue her.
2	"Operetta: The Watching Spirit"; Transliteration: "Operetta - Mitsumeru Seirei" (Japanese: オペレッタ 見つめる精霊)	Shigenori Awai	Ichiro Sasaki	April 10, 2007
A woman by the name of Maura Ren hires Office Tsuge to get rid of a spirit that has been gliding by her room whenever she is changing. Eufinley sends Rembart to investigate while Phoron and Coatie are on another assignment involving demolition work. They find that the four-winged spirit and is very evasive, so Phoron and Coatie are sent to support.
3	"Polka: The Left-Behind Item on the Ocean Bed"; Transliteration: "Poruka - Umi no Soko no Wasuremono" (Japanese: ポルカ 海の底の忘れ物)	Matsuo Asami	Toshihiko Kikuchi	April 17, 2007
Office Tsuge is at the beach to field a request from a man who is competing with his brother to recover an object from a sunken ship in order to inherit their father's company. The man's brother meanwhile has hired a mysterious Dantist to ensure his side will recover the object first.
4	"Dal Segno: The Day It All Began"; Transliteration: "Daru Sēnyo - Hajimari no Hi" (Japanese: ダルセーニョ 始まりの日)	Yuji Uchida	Shinku Hidaka	April 24, 2007
Upon taking out their father's mementos (tuning forks), the Yugiri twins remember the day they visited Torvas Divine Song Players Academy as prospective students. They meet Phoron and Eufinley for the first time. Later, Pelse finds that she left her father's memento in the changing room, so they go after school to retrieve it. When they find Pelse's fork, Prinesca hears Phoron singing. At the same time, Corticarte, who has been imprisoned underneath the school, hears Phoron's singing and goes berserk and frees herself from her chains.
5	"Affannato: The Bond of Betrayal"; Transliteration: "Affannāto - Uragiri no Kizuna" (Japanese: アッファンナート 裏切りの絆)	Takashi Kawabata	Junichi Osako	May 1, 2007
A novice Dantist named Suzune asks Office Tsuge to investigate why her contract spirit Koccino has left her and is hanging out with another Dantist. Eufinley and her spirit Yardy discover that Koccino has gone back to her former Dantist, a rock musician who had come across hard times since Yardy had left. The musician is influenced by Akatsuki to hold Koccino captive for their next concert.
6	"Scherzo: The Reason to be Together"; Transliteration: "Sukerutso - Soba ni Iru Riyū" (Japanese: スケルツォ 傍にいる理由)	Michita Shiraishi	Madoka Takadono, Shinku Hidaka	May 8, 2007
Phoron and Coatie help a girl named Aria track down her runaway cat, but must do it without using magic such as the Divine Song. Eufinley receives a phone call from another Divine Music Player Office asking for Rembart to transfer to their office. When Phoron falls into a river and catches a cold, Eufinley has Rembart help Aria instead. While Prinesca and Phoron are worried if Renbart will transfer or not, Pelse and Coatie compete to be the girl to nurse Phoron back to health.
7	"Violenza: The Dark Pursuer"; Transliteration: "Vaiorentsa - Kuroi Tsuisekisha" (Japanese: ヴァイオレンツァ 黒い追跡者)	Shigenori Awai	Junichi Osako	May 15, 2007
Office Tsuge has a day off in which Eufinley and Rembart are off to do their own errands, while the rest of the crew are sweeping up. Yanma Dawson, Phoron's old schoolmate, arrives and pleads for their help as he is being pursued by two people, a mysterious and persistent big man and a petite expressionless little girl in black. The Yugiri twins distract the man and the girl while Yamna, Phoron, and Coatie escape in Yanma's vehicle, but the two pursuers soon catch up to them in a car chase all around town. Coatie wants to fight them, but realizes the man is actually a contract spirit named Managa, and the girl is his Dantist Matia, and that they are police officers hoping to recover a lost one-man orchestra artifact.
8	"Serenade: Between Human and Spirit"; Transliteration: "Serenāde - Hito to Seirei no Hazama ni" (Japanese: セレナーデ 人と精霊の狭間に)	Takeshi Kitazawa	Shinku Hidaka	May 22, 2007
Prinesica receives a love letter in her shoe locker. Pelse shares that information to their colleagues and they encourage her to meet the guy. Prine and Pelse observe the guy at school and he seems normal enough, but Prine is worried. Coatie does not like the situation at all, and drags Phoron along to watch the confession. Although the guy plays a beautiful song and asks her out, Prine turns him down. It is revealed that Prine is part spirit, having merged with her father's contract spirit when she was younger.
9	"Rhapsody: The Tale of a Divine Song Player"; Transliteration: "Rapusodi - Toaru Shinkyoku Gakushi no Hanashi" (Japanese: ラプソディ とある神曲楽士の話)	Yuji Uchida	Toshihiko Tsukiji	May 29, 2007
During one of their recent jobs, Phoron loses his concentration. He appears to be in a slump and cannot play his music. Eufinley tells Coatie to find a composer named Zare to see if he can help with Phoron's situation. At first, Zare refuses to help her write a song, but then reveals his personal reasons for doing so.
10	"Ballade: What Comes After Hatred"; Transliteration: "Barādo - Aizō no Ketchaku" (Japanese: バラード 愛憎の決着)	Takashi Kawabata	Junichi Osako	June 5, 2007
During a conflict with Akatsuki and Mailreit at a demolition site, Rembart injures his hand, so Phoron and Coatie are sent to replace him. It seems that Akatsuki is protecting the house and doing every possible to prevent the group from tearing it down.
11	"Requiem: The Singing Spirit"; Transliteration: "Rekuiemu - Utau Seirei" (Japanese: レクイエム 歌う精霊)	Michita Shiraishi	Ichiro Sasaki	June 12, 2007
Terero Termin, a renowned One-Man Orchestra developer, asks the Tsuge Office for help in developing his Counterfeit Rainbow, an automatic instrument that can play Commandia without a Dantist. However, he dies before finishing it. While in the town, activity from anti-spirits movement are becoming more dangerous, and rumors about a spirit who can Commandia. Believing that the Counterfeit Rainbow has the soul of Termin, Krista sings the Commandia even though it endangers her own life.
12	"Symphony: The Divine Song of the Rainbow"; Transliteration: "Shinfonī - Niji no Gakkyoku" (Japanese: シンフォニー 虹の楽曲)	Masami Shimoda	Ichiro Sasaki	June 19, 2007
Phoron and Corti keep trying to convince Krista that continuing on singing for the fake Commandia from the Counterfeit Rainbow will just hurt her. In the meantime, the anti-spirits movement has set up their spirit bomb. When it's opened by accident, the berserk spirit inside causes all lower level spirits to lose control and creates havoc across the city.

== Shinkyoku Sōkai Polyphonica Crimson S ==
This series involves characters in the Crimson series but covers events when Phoron, Eufinley and Rembart are still students at Torvas Academy. The opening theme song for Crimson S is the same as in the first series.

No. overall	No. in season	Title	Original release date
1	1	"A Chance Meeting: misterioso" Transliteration: "Kaikō: Misterioso" (Japanese: 邂逅: misterioso)	April 4, 2009
Some 12 years past, Corticarte Apa Lagranges is being chased by a number of other spirits. As she tries to get away from them, a young Phoron sits on the roof of his orphanage singing to himself. Corticarte hears his song and is entranced by it, and by extension the singer. She flies to the source of the song and finds Phoron. Corticarte reveals herself and that she wants him all for herself because of his pure heart and asks if he will sing only for her. She tries to make a contract with him, but is interrupted by the spirits that were chasing her. Back in the present, Phoron is cleaning the canteen of the Dantist Academy, to pay his tuition. Dantists are people who summon spirit through music and Phoron decided to be a Dantist after he met Corticarte. However, even though he has trained and was able to entrance a spirit as a child, he is unable summon any spirits. His latest attempt to play an Commandia fails, but as he leaves, dejected, he recalls Corticarte complimenting his singing as a child. He then decides to sing the same song he sang the night that Corticarte appeared in front of him. As he sings an unknown man removes the seal from a room in which a dark spirit has been imprisoned. On hearing the song, the dark spirit destroys everything that gets in its way looking for the source of the song. Eufinly tries to stop it, but her spirit is overpowered. As Phoron calls out Eufinly's name the dark spirit stops its rampage and approaches him. The spirit sloughs off its dark shell revealing a little girl with red hair - Corticarte, in the form of a child. Phoron doesn't recognize her as Corticarte until she actually tells him, partly because of her child-like appearance and also because he thought that their previous encounter was a dream. Corticarte berates Phoron and then completes her contract with him, which was previously interrupted, with a kiss.
2	2	"Maze: Piangendo"; Transliteration: "Meiro: Piangendo" (Japanese: 迷路: piangendo)	April 11, 2009
Phoron has a Commandia performance the following day and is deeply worried by Corticarte. During the performance students in the audience make remarks about him and his poor music causing Corticate to lose her temper. Phoron uses his Divine song to try to calm her but it is so poorly done that it actually angers her and she leaves Phoron for several days. Feeling lost without her, Phoron encounters the Headmaster who gives him some friendly advice.
3	3	"Covenant: Loco"; Transliteration: "Meiyaku: Loco" (Japanese: 盟約: loco)	April 18, 2009
After getting made fun of my Danguis and becoming unable to summon any spirits, Phoron is scolded by Prine for only wanting to be respected as a dantist and not actually putting his heart into his commandia. Phoron listens to Perse who plays her commandia for him to listen, and comes to a realization. He comes up with a new Commandia which he plans to try out in private but he encounters Renbart, who asks if he can sit in. Phoron agrees and Renbart pulls a fast one on him, ushering Prine and Perse into the hall along with him. Resigned to an expanded audience, Phoron plays his new Commandia which is so beguiling that not only is he able to call forth lesser two-winged spirits, which he has never been able to do before, but he also summons a number of mid-level four-winged spirits, which very few Dantists with his level of experience can do. Corti also hears the song and returns to Phoron, though she takes objection to Renbart suggesting that if Phoron makes covenants with all of the four-winged spirits that appeared he would be a Dantist to be reckoned with.
4	4	"Secret Maneuvers: Rubato"; Transliteration: "An'yaku: Rubato" (Japanese: 暗躍: rubato)	April 25, 2009
5	5	"Conspiracy: Feroce"; Transliteration: "Bōryaku: Feroce" (Japanese: 謀略: feroce)	May 2, 2009
6	6	"Pair of Souls: Affettuoso"; Transliteration: "Sōkon: Affettuoso" (Japanese: 双魂: affettuoso)	May 9, 2009
7	7	"Startup: Amabile"; Transliteration: "Shidō: Amabile" (Japanese: 始動: amabile)	May 16, 2009
8	8	"Earthquake: Furioso"; Transliteration: "Gekishin: Furioso" (Japanese: 激震: furioso)	May 23, 2009
9	9	"Ambitions: Marcato"; Transliteration: "Yabō: Marcato" (Japanese: 野望: marcato)	May 30, 2009
10	10	"The Attack: Risoluto"; Transliteration: "Shinkō: Risoluto" (Japanese: 進攻: risoluto)	June 6, 2009
11	11	"Dismemberment: Tempestoso"; Transliteration: "Kaitai: Tempestoso" (Japanese: 解体: tempestoso)	June 13, 2009
12	12	"Hope: Vivace"; Transliteration: "Kibō: Vivace" (Japanese: 希望: vivace)	June 20, 2009
