= Sunny Side Story =

Studio album by Haruka Tomatsu
- Released: (Japan) 16 January 2013
- Genre: Pop
- Label: Sony Music

Haruka Tomatsu chronology
Rainbow Road (2010)	Sunny Side Story (2013)	'Harukarisk*Land' (2015)

Sunny Side Story is the second studio album from Japanese singer and voice actress Haruka Tomatsu, released on 16 January 2013. Two editions of the album were released: a standard version containing the music CD, and a special edition containing the CD as well as a DVD with bonus video clips.

== Track listing ==
No.	Title	Length
1.	"RUN"	4:31
2.	"Q&A Recital! (Q&A リサイタル!) (My Little Monster opening theme)"	4:50
3.	"Nagisa no Shooting Star (渚のSHOOTING STAR)"	4:39
4.	"♪Make Up Sweet Girl☆"	4:04
5.	"Baby Baby Love (Motto To Love-Ru ending theme)"	4:26
6.	"Yasashiki Hibi (やさしき日々)"	5:48
7.	"Mirai Girl (ミライガール)"	3:58
8.	"Issai Gassai"	3:55
9.	"Hoshi no Stage (星のステージ)"	4:12
10.	"Yume Sekai (ユメセカイ) (Sword Art Online ending theme)"	4:49
11.	"Oh My God♥ (Nekogami Yaoyorozu ending theme)"	4:12
12.	"STAGE"	4:48
13.	"Ashita Iro Himawari (明日色ひまわり)"	4:24

== Bonus content ==
=== DVD edition ===
1. "Ashita Iro Himawari" Music Clip
2. Side Story of Sunny Side Story
