= Rainbow Road (album) =

Studio album by Haruka Tomatsu
- Released: (Japan) 24 February 2010
- Genre: Pop
- Label: Sony Music

Haruka Tomatsu chronology
Rainbow Road (2010)	Sunny Side Story (2013)

Rainbow Road is the debut studio album from Japanese singer and voice actress Haruka Tomatsu, released on 24 February 2010. It consists of nearly all the songs from her previous anime theme singles, eight in all, plus six new songs. Two editions of the album were released: a standard version containing the music CD, and a special edition containing the CD as well as a DVD with bonus video clips. The album peaked at number 15 on Oricon Albums Chart.

== Track listing ==
No.	Title	Length
1.	"Jikochuu Otoko (自己中男)"	3:33
2.	"Motto Hade Ni Ne! (motto☆派手にね!) (Kannagi: Crazy Shrine Maidens opening theme)"	4:40
3.	"Circle"	4:20
4.	"Nanairo Michi Shirube (七色みちしるべ)"	4:33
5.	"Girls, Be Ambitious. (So Ra No Wo To ending theme)"	3:54
6.	"Rewind"	4:06
7.	"Kioku no Keshiki (記憶の景色)"	4:20
8.	"Musuhi no Toki (産巣日の時) (Kannagi: Crazy Shrine Maidens ending theme)"	4:32
9.	"Naissance"	4:45
10.	"Rainbow"	4:33
11.	"Counter Attack"	3:57
12.	"Mirai Tokei (未来時計)"	4:16
13.	"Star☆Tripper"	3:43
14.	"Koi no Uta (こいのうた) (Shinkyoku Sōkai Polyphonica Crimson S ending theme)"	4:36

== Bonus content ==
=== DVD edition ===
1. "Naissance" Music Clip
2. "Motto Hade Ni Ne!" Music Clip
3. "Musuhi No Toki" Music Clip
4. "Koi no Uta" Music Clip
5. "Girls, Be Ambitious." Music Clip
6. Road to Rainbow Road
7. ウラ★naissance
