= The Lord Magear's Apprentice =

Japanese manga series

- First tankōbon volume cover

ロードマギアの弟子 (Rōdo Magia no Deshi)
- Genre: Adventure; Fantasy; Sword and sorcery
- Manga
- Written by: FLIPFLOPs
- Published by: Shogakukan
- English publisher: NA: Seven Seas Entertainment
- Imprint: Shōnen Sunday Comics Special
- Magazine: Sunday Webry
- Original run: June 19, 2024 – present
- Volumes: 8

The Lord Magear's Apprentice (ロードマギアの弟子, Rōdo Magia no Deshi) is a Japanese manga series written and illustrated by FLIPFLOPs. It began serialization on Shogakukan's Sunday Webry manga service in June 2024.

== Synopsis ==
After having been saved as a child mercenary by a sorcerer, Gar joins a knight order whose task is to hunt rogue sorcerers, but the order suddenly gets attacked by a powerful sorcerer with an intimidating aura. Gar, again, has his life saved by that same sorcerer who saved him when he was a child, and unwillingly becomes that sorcerer's apprentice.

== Publication ==
Written and illustrated by FLIPFLOPs, The Lord Magear's Apprentice began serialization on Shogakukan's Sunday Webry manga service on June 19, 2024. Its chapters have been compiled into eight tankōbon volumes as of October 2026.

In October 2025, Seven Seas Entertainment announced that they had licensed the series for English publication, with the first volume set to release in September 2026.

No.	Original release date	Original ISBN	North American release date	North American ISBN
1	November 12, 2024	978-4-09-853688-7	September 29, 2026	979-8-89765-943-2
1. "The Young Boy Mercenary"; 2. "Travel Companion"; 3. "First Training"; 4. "Rain and Magic (Part 1)"; 5. "Rain and Magic (Part 2)"; 6. "Pursuer, Pursued"
2	February 12, 2025	978-4-09-853849-2	November 10, 2026	979-8-89765-993-7
3	June 12, 2025	978-4-09-854128-7	February 9, 2027	979-8-89863-096-6
4	October 10, 2025	978-4-09-854266-6	June 15, 2027	979-8-89863-307-3
5	January 9, 2026	978-4-09-854409-7	—	—
6	April 10, 2026	978-4-09-854552-0	—	—
7	July 10, 2026	978-4-09-854704-3	—	—
8	October 9, 2026	978-4-09-854837-8	—	—

== See also ==
- Darwin's Game, another manga series by FLIPFLOPs
- The Everyday Tales of a Cat God, another manga series by FLIPFLOPs
