= Darwin's Game =

Japanese manga series

- First volume cover

ダーウィンズゲーム (Dāwinzu Gēmu)
- Genre: Supernatural
- Manga
- Written by: FLIPFLOPs
- Published by: Akita Shoten
- English publisher: NA: Titan Comics
- Imprint: Shōnen Champion Comics
- Magazine: Bessatsu Shōnen Champion
- Original run: December 12, 2012 – October 12, 2023
- Volumes: 30
- Anime television series
- Directed by: Yoshinobu Tokumoto
- Written by: Shū Miyama
- Music by: Kenichiro Suehiro
- Studio: Nexus
- Licensed by: NA: Aniplex of America
- Original network: Tokyo MX, BS11, GTV, GYT, AT-X, YTV, TVA, NCC
- Original run: January 3, 2020 – March 20, 2020
- Episodes: 11
- Manga

Flag Game
- Written by: FLIPFLOPs
- Illustrated by: Guuno
- Published by: Akita Shoten
- Magazine: Bessatsu Shōnen Champion
- Original run: October 2026 – scheduled
- Live-action film
- Directed by: Fumihiko Sori
- Written by: Hayato Miura; Fumihiko Sori (chief)
- Released: March 12, 2027
- icon

Darwin's Game (Japanese: ダーウィンズゲーム, Hepburn: Dāwinzu Gēmu) is a Japanese manga series written and illustrated by FLIPFLOPs. It was serialized in Akita Shoten's Bessatsu Shōnen Champion magazine from December 2012 to October 2023. An anime television series adaptation produced by Nexus aired from January to March 2020. A live-action film adaptation is set to premiere in March 2027.

== Premise ==
17-year-old high school sophomore Kaname Sudō accepts an online invitation from a friend to play an app game called Darwin's Game, unaware that it involves a fight between life and death. Those who play the game are given a Sigil, an ability that varies from player to player. Trapped in this game of relentless murder and conquest, Kaname determines to clear the game, and to seek out and kill the Game Master.

It is revealed later in the series that the Game Master is one of many in the multiverse and is actually benevolent, albeit in the greater good way. Monsters called Greed are infiltrating worlds and eating and replacing people, bringing about repeated Armageddon. Darwin's Game is meant to train Champions to eliminate them.

== Characters ==
=== Sunset Ravens ===
It is clan founded/led by Kaname and his allies in Darwin's Game. After taking control of Shibuya, they established it as a safe territory where Darwin's Game is forbidden.

Kaname Sudō (須藤 要, Sudō Kaname)
Voiced by: Yūsuke Kobayashi (Japanese); Stephen Fu (English)
Portrayed by: Taishi Nakagawa
The male protagonist of the story and a 17-year-old high school student who accidentally gets roped into Darwin's Game after the death of his good friends. His Sigil "The Fire God's Hammer", allows him to recreate weapons and other simple objects he has touched before, in addition to modifying them to his will, although this exhausts him easily and the objects created will disappear should he lose consciousness. Despite the ruthless nature of the game, Kaname possesses a kind heart and tries not to kill unless the situation calls for it. His intelligence, rationality and ability to react to situations have developed him to become a top player in Darwin's Game without a single loss. Together with Shuka, he created and leads the clan Sunset Ravens, whose territory is in Shibuya.
Shuka Karino (狩野 朱歌, Karino Shuka)
Voiced by: Reina Ueda (Japanese); Alexis Tipton (English)
Portrayed by: Kōki
The female protagonist of the story and an 18-year-old girl from a rich family. After witnessing the death of her parents at the hands of a Darwin's Game player, she was tricked by a girl named Miho into it, discovered its existence, and slaughtered both Miho and her parents' murderer. She later becomes Kaname's main romantic interest. Her Sigil "Princess of Thorn" allows her to control wire-like objects, which she utilises to wield spiked chains. Her mobility and dexterity with her weapons, coupled with her ruthlessness, has earned her the title of the "Undefeated Queen" that terrorised the area of Roppongi. Together with Kaname, they formed the clan Sunset Ravens.
Rein Kashiwagi (柏木 鈴音, Kashiwagi Rein)
Voiced by: Nichika Ōmori (Japanese); Tia Ballard (English)
Portrayed by: Mei Hata
A 13-year-old middle school student who acts as an informant for the players of Darwin's Game. Despite her age, her great intellect, maturity and ability to stay calm has earned her the respect of many players. Her Sigil "Laplace's Demon" allows her to calculate physical vectors and knowledge to such an extent to the point where she can visualise the near future, although her ability can be countered by moving in manners that surpass physical limits and conventional predictions. While she would normally prefer to run away, she can fight by combining her ability with a sniper's firepower. After joining Sunset Ravens, she works with Kaname to crack the code behind the game.
Ryūji Maesaka (前坂 隆二, Maesaka Ryūji)
Voiced by: Taku Yashiro (Japanese); Jarrod Greene (English)
Portrayed by: Fūju Kamio
A 21-year-old man that was initially enemies with Kaname during an event, but became friends after working together. His Sigil "Lie Detector" essentially allows him to discern if someone is lying or not, but it does not work if the person believes what they are saying is really true or plain ignorant. Since his Sigil grants him no combat ability, he wears bulletproof suits, masks and is heavily armed with artillery when he fights. He joined the game with his brother to earn money at first, but changed his goal to getting revenge on Wang of the Eighth clan after his brother was killed by him. He joined Sunset Ravens and is often seen alongside Sui.
Sui/Sōta (スイ/ソータ)
Voiced by: Yumiri Hanamori (Japanese); Brittany Lauda (English)
The youngest member of Sunset Ravens with a dual personality due to the presence of her deceased older twin brother Sōta's soul within her body. While Sui is quiet, shy and soft-hearted, Sōta is violent, bloodthirsty and outspoken. Despite their differences, the twins get along very well and their souls can frequently switch to utilise each of their own Sigils respectively. Sui's Sigil, "Pollux Light", allows her to control water, including those within living things, although she is unable to move it quickly; while Sōta's Sigil, "Castor Light", allows him to freeze things, which he uses in conjunction with his sister's to kill.
Liu Xuelan (劉 雪蘭)
Voiced by: Ai Kayano (Japanese); Katelyn Barr (English)
The top-ranked player of Darwin's Game and a hitwoman-for-hire. Hailing from a clan of Taiwanese assassins, Xuelan primarily relies on her assassin abilities instead of her Sigil, which is unknown to all members of the game, and fights wearing a kitsune mask. She is known for her signature move "Killing Intent" which allows her to psych out her opponents by simulating themselves being stabbed by a katana. Initially trying to convince Kaname to become the heir to her clan after witnessing his abilities, she joins Sunset Ravens after losing a clan duel to them.
Ichiro Hiiragi (ヒイラギ イチロウ, Hiiragi Ichirō)
Voiced by: Takehito Koyasu (Japanese); Chris Wehkamp (English)
Portrayed by: Koji Yamamoto
A middle-aged man who was initially at odds against Kaname during an event, but worked together with the group against Wang and the Eighth. He is known as "The Florist" due to his Sigil giving him the ability to control plants, even going so far as being able to control other people if they are incapacitated using plants with narcotic properties. Since his Sigil gives his long-distance combat abilities, he tends to camp out far away from the action, though he will make sure he can see his opponents. He joined Darwin's Game to earn money to pay for his ailing daughter Suzune. He dies during the treasure hunt event at the hands of Eighth members.

=== Others ===
Hamada (ハマダ, Hamada)
Voiced by: Yūya Hirose (Japanese); Clifford Chapin (English)
An anime-only character and one of Kaname's good friends who sent him an invitation to Darwin's Game in the form of a Help Call. He is killed by Banda-kun at the start of the series.
Kyōda (キョウダ, Kyōda)
Voiced by: Chiaki Kobayashi (Japanese); Kyle Phillips (English)
One of Kaname's good friends who came to his aid during his fight with Banda-kun. His Sigil allows him to see the aura of living things, and he uses a crossbow to fight. He dies of blood loss as Kaname fights, and becomes Kaname's main motivation to find the Game Master and clear the game. In the manga, Kyoda dies while being chased by Banda-kun and his Sigil is never revealed.
Shinozuka (シノヅカ, Shinozuka)
Voiced by: Fukushi Ochiai (Japanese); Cris George (English)
One of Kaname's good friends who was held hostage by Wang after the treasure hunt event. He had his fingers mutilated, and joined Darwin's Game per Kaname's intervention, earning a Sigil that allowed him to levitate objects. Despite his newfound power, he is chopped to pieces by Wang and becomes Kaname's main motivation to find the Game Master and clear the game.
Suzune Hiiragi (ヒイラギ 鈴音, Hiiragi Suzune)
Voiced by: Konomi Kohara (Japanese); Apphia Yu (English)
Ichiro's daughter. She is diagnosed with a weak heart and her father played Darwin's Game in order to acquire money for her operation. After the treasure hunt event that claimed her father's life, she becomes close friends with Rein, though she remains in the dark about what happened to her father due to the rules about revealing the game's existence to outsiders. She was tricked into joining, dying from the stress and activating her Sigil; it gave her a catgirl transformation (and possibly 8 additional lives). She joined Sunset Ravens.
Banda-kun (バンダ君, Banda-kun)
Voiced by: Eiji Takemoto (Japanese); Jeremy Inman (English)
Kaname's first opponent and an infamous player known as the "rookie hunter" for targeting weak newbies and stealing their points. He joined the game for money and entertainment from his boring job, choosing to wear the local baseball team's mascot costume to conceal his face when he kills. His Sigil "Stealth" lets him turn invisible, although this led to his downfall when a car knocked him over and he lost against Kaname.
Wang (王, Wān)
Voiced by: Yoshitsugu Matsuoka (Japanese); Mike McFarland (English)
The leader of the notorious yakuza clan Eighth that ruled over Shibuya before the Sunset Ravens came. His Sigil allows him to reach extremely high heights within a second. Bloodthirsty, violent and wicked, he delights in torturing people, having a habit of cutting off their fingers and pickling them into juice. He is characterized by delusions of grandeur, believing himself to be the protagonist of the game. He is later killed by Kaname, who becomes the next ruler of Shibuya territory.
Keiichi (ケーイチ, Keiichi)
Voiced by: Ryuichi Kijima (Japanese); Zach Bolton (English)
Wang's aide, who possesses one of the most powerful abilities in Eighth. His Sigil allows him to manipulate air currents, which he combines with his karate skills to fight both hand-to-hand and long-range. In the past he took part in many karate tournaments, until he accidentally killed his opponent during one of his matches and was forced to end his career as a martial artist. He was forcibly teleported away piece by piece after Kaname used his privilege to take all of the points Eighth had, causing the elimination of all the members of the Eighth clan from Darwin's Game.

== Media ==
=== Manga ===
FLIPFLOPs launched the series in the January 2013 issue of Akita Shoten's shōnen manga magazine Bessatsu Shōnen Champion which was published on December 12, 2012. The series was compiled into 30 volumes from June 2013 to January 2024. The manga entered its final arc on January 11, 2020. The manga ended serialization in October 2023.

In March 2026, Titan Comics announced that they had licensed the series for English publication in a 3-in-1 omnibus release in October later in the year.

A manga adaptation of the Flag Game novel illustrated by Guuno is set to begin serialization in Bessatsu Shōnen Champion in October 2026.

No.	Japanese release date	Japanese ISBN
1	June 7, 2013	978-4-253-22188-7
2	October 8, 2013	978-4-253-22189-4
3	February 7, 2014	978-4-253-22190-0
4	July 8, 2014	978-4-253-22191-7
5	November 7, 2014	978-4-253-22192-4
6	March 6, 2015	978-4-253-22193-1
7	August 7, 2015	978-4-253-22194-8
8	December 8, 2015	978-4-253-22195-5
9	May 6, 2016	978-4-253-22196-2
10	October 7, 2016	978-4-253-22197-9
11	January 6, 2017	978-4-253-22198-6
12	May 8, 2017	978-4-253-22199-3
13	October 6, 2017	978-4-253-22200-6
14	March 8, 2018	978-4-253-22207-5
15	August 8, 2018	978-4-253-22212-9
16	November 8, 2018	978-4-253-22215-0
17	March 8, 2019	978-4-253-22217-4
18	July 8, 2019	978-4-253-22218-1
19	December 6, 2019	978-4-253-22219-8
20	March 6, 2020	978-4-253-22220-4
21	August 6, 2020	978-4-253-22227-3
22	December 8, 2020	978-4-253-22230-3
23	May 7, 2021	978-4-253-22318-8
24	September 8, 2021	978-4-253-22319-5
25	January 7, 2022	978-4-253-22320-1
26	June 8, 2022	978-4-253-28211-6
27	December 8, 2022	978-4-253-28212-3
28	June 8, 2023	978-4-253-28213-0
29	September 7, 2023	978-4-253-28214-7
30	January 5, 2024	978-4-253-28215-4

=== Anime ===
An anime television series adaptation was announced in the 16th volume of the manga on November 8, 2018. The series is directed by Yoshinobu Tokumoto and written by Shū Miyama, the writer of the FLIPFLOPs duo and also original creator of the manga series, with animation by studio Nexus and character designs by Kazuya Nakanishi. Kenichiro Suehiro is composing the series' music. The series aired from January 3 to March 20, 2020, on Tokyo MX and other channels. The first episode was listed as a one-hour episode and had an advanced screening on the night of December 24, 2019. ASCA performed the series' opening theme song "CHAIN", while Mashiro Ayano performed the series' ending theme song "Alive". Aniplex of America licensed the series, and began streaming the series on FunimationNow, AnimeLab and Wakanim from January 3, 2020, and on Crunchyroll and HIDIVE from February 2, 2020. Funimation produced an English dub for the series. It ran for 11 episodes.

No.	Title (Note: All English titles are taken from Funimation.)	Directed by	Written by	Storyboarded by	Original release date
1	"First Game"; Transliteration: "Fāsuto Gēmu" (Japanese: 初陣(ファーストゲーム))	Yoshinobu Tokumoto	Shū Miyama	Yoshinobu Tokumoto	January 3, 2020 (Note: Funimation premiered the episode on January 3, 2020 as a 1-hour special.)
A boy named Hamada attempts to flee from an invisible person, only to be killed. High school student Kaname Sudō receives a message from his friend Hamada inviting him to join a mysterious online game: Darwin's Game. Strange things begin happening after he starts it; he experiences a hallucination of himself being bitten by a snake, and is challenged arbitrarily to a deathmatch with a man in a panda mascot costume known as Banda-kun. Kaname is saved by his other friend Kyōda, who explains that Darwin's Game is a cruel, real-life survival game that pits players against one another. During a match, there is no way to call for help except for within the game. In addition, the game grants each of its players a unique superhuman ability known as a "Sigil", with Banda-kun's ability being able to turn invisible. Kaname puts up a good fight but ends up being outmatched until out of pure luck, a car collides into Banda-kun while invisible and promptly ends the match. Banda-kun's body is then teleported away bit by bit, leaving only a pixelated body carving in the floor. While Kaname is fighting, Kyōda dies of blood loss, having been stabbed by Banda-kun earlier, but leaves a message to Kaname telling him to survive. Kaname's win as a solo rookie player draws the attention of a high-ranking player Shuka Karino. Shuka invites him to a warehouse to answer any questions he has about the game, where Kaname is forced to accept that he cannot quit the game. When he is unable to use his Sigil, nor is the app able to analyse his power, Shuka attacks him using her chains. In the heat of the battle, Kaname uses his wits and skills to avoid her, and manages to unlock his Sigil, the ability to recreate weapons he has previously touched. He sets a trap for Shuka and defeats her. Realising that Kaname truly knows nothing about the game and having seen his Skills firsthand, Shuka surrenders, forcefully terminating the match so both players stay alive. The two then spend the night at Shuka's mansion.
2	"Gemstone Mine"; Transliteration: "Jemusutōn Main" (Japanese: 渋谷(ジェムストーンマイン))	Daisuke Takashima	Shū Miyama	Daisuke Takashima	January 10, 2020
Shuka invites Kaname to join a clan – a group of players in Darwin's Game that battle and earn points together. She tells him that many in the game play it as points from victories can be used as in-game currency or be redeemed for real-life cash, and advises him to use some points to temporarily hide his name from the challenge list especially after winning against two high-ranked players. She also tells him that it is forbidden to reveal details about the game to any non-player lest they be forcefully teleported. Shuka and Kaname receive a notification for Darwin's Game's first major event, a Treasure Hunt event in Shibuya that has been sent only to selected players. After clashing with a mysterious player known as Inukai who warns him to protect his cellphone, the two are separated, having been teleported to the city centre in Shibuya. The event entails each of the 300 players collecting at least three rings before time is up to survive, despite there only being 300 rings available. Each ring also possesses different values of points depending on the gemstone set into it. Kaname is teleported to the 27th floor of a hotel, while Rein Kashiwagi – a middle school student known as "the Analyst" for her skill at procuring and selling information, including the details on Kaname's location that allowed Inukai to locate him – is in the same building.
3	"Ignition"; Transliteration: "Igunisshon" (Japanese: 引き金(イグニッション))	Usaku Myouchin	Shū Miyama	Usaku Myouchin	January 17, 2020
Apart from himself, Rein and Shuka, Kaname is informed that Wang, the ruler of an infamous clan named Eighth that has claimed Shibuya as their territory, is also participating in the game. By the time he exits his hotel room, almost ten players have been killed in the hotel and floors from the 25th floor downwards have been barricaded by thick greenery. Rein warns Kaname against taking the elevator, and her predictions prove true when four players that chose to do so show up, having been drugged by narcotics plants into attacking the two, who are the sole survivors left in the hotel that are not brainwashed. Rein guesses that the one behind all this is a player known as "the Florist", who possesses the ability to manipulate plants, and Kaname deduces that he is utilising the hotel's security cameras to direct his soldiers. Creating a handgun, Kaname and Rein destroy as many cameras as they possibly can, while using flashbangs to flee and hide from the soldiers.
4	"Fireworks"; Transliteration: "Faiāwākusu" (Japanese: 火花(ファイアーワークス))	Yoshinobu Tokumoto, Daisuke Takashim	Shū Miyama	Kazuya Nakanishi	January 24, 2020
Having disabled several surveillance cameras, Kaname and Rein head out to one of the autolock hotel rooms to hide and plan their next move. Based on the cameras that were destroyed, the Florist correctly figures out where they have been hiding. However, Kaname and Rein set a trap for the Florist with Rein disarming the soldiers and distracting him, allowing Kaname to reach the first floor and locate him in the hotel's control room. Kaname and the Florist, a middle-aged man whose real name is Ichiro Hiiragi, battle it out and Kaname is initially close to losing due to the Florist's impenetrable plant defense, high combat ability, and the side effects of overly exhausting his Sigil. However, Kaname sees a vision of a man resembling him using blacksmith tools to carve weapons, that encourages him to explore the limits of his ability. Kaname reawakens, creating stronger bullets that are powerful enough to penetrate his armor by sacrificing the gun's durability to win the fight. Rein, reuniting with Kaname, informs him and Hiiragi of the Eighth's intention to attack the hotel to steal all the rings. As everyone is utterly exhausted, Rein proposes that they form a temporary clan to fight against Eighth and protect their rings, to which Hiiragi accepts.
4.5	"Logline"; Transliteration: "Rogurain" (Japanese: 記憶(ログライン))	N/A	N/A	N/A	January 31, 2020
A recap episode summarizing the first 4 episodes.
5	"Aquarium"; Transliteration: "Akuariumu" (Japanese: 水葬(アクアリウム))	Daisuke Takashima	Shū Miyama	Daisuke Takashima	February 7, 2020
As the Eighth prepares to invade the hotel, Kaname forms a makeshift clan with Rein, Ichiro, and Ryuji Maesaka, the player Kaname gave a ring to before becoming Ichiro's puppet in the elevator. While making preparations for the Eighth's arrival, Rein notices that the point values of the gems do not align with the appraisal values getting her to think that there is much more to this event than what the rules state, and that the objective might be something besides gathering three rings. Meanwhile, Shuka sends out a distress message to Kaname as she encounters Sui, whose Sigil allows her to control water, in the subway and Sui floods it trapping Shuka underwater. Kaname and Ryuji head out to the subway, while back at the hotel Rein and Ichiro notice that all rings have a QR code that reveal a number when scanned. Kaname and Ryuji reveal their Sigils to each other with Ryuji's being the ability to tell whether a person is lying or not. The two encounter Sui and at the subway entrance, Kaname goes in to rescue Shuka, while Ryuji turns confrontational towards Sui knowing through his Sigil that she was lying when she claimed to know nothing about the subway.
6	"Hardness"; Transliteration: "Hādonesu" (Japanese: 金剛(ハードネス))	Usaku Myouchin	Shū Miyama	Usaku Myouchin	February 14, 2020
Sui, a kid with a dual personality with her late twin brother Sota's spirit in control of her body, leads Ryuji into a trap at a convenience store using the bottled water in the refrigerator to attack, but before she could deliver the finishing blow, Sui regains control of her body from Sota to stop the attack and afterwards, Sui agrees to join the clan. Meanwhile, Kaname rescues Shuka and after administering CPR, Shuka gives him his first kiss. Shuka explains her reason for participating in Darwin's Game and that is to get revenge against a player who murdered her parents. The four meet up at the convenience store to get to know Sui better. Night falls as the next set of rings is distributed with the biggest prize, the diamond ring, spawning at the hotel giving Rein a chance to get the code from the ring. Ichiro reveals that he played the game because he needs money to support his daughter Suzune, who has a bad heart. With the Eighth invading the hotel, Ichiro takes possession of the rings to use as bait, as well as to help the other clan members hide their location, and he sets a trap at the hotel killing several Eighth clan members. Rein uses the diversion to run towards Shibuya Station as through the numbers and understanding that they are related to hardness, Rein figures out that the numbers refer to the latitude and longitude coordinates of the true treasure in this event.
7	"Eighth"; Transliteration: "Eisu" (Japanese: 圧砕(エイス))	Daisuke Takashima	Shū Miyama	Kazuya Nakanishi	February 21, 2020
Ichiro battles Sig, whose pyrokinesis Sigil puts him at a huge disadvantage. Having set a trap at the hotel, Ichiro runs away with Sig in pursuit to activate it. However, he is ambushed by Keiichi, who along with Sig are Wang's strongest henchmen, and the two mortally wound him. Using his Sigil on body to keep himself alive a little bit longer, Ichiro activates the trap to collapse the hotel crushing and killing the members of the Eighth clan present. Meanwhile, Rein arrives at Shibuya Station and learns that while the Eighth also figured out that the true treasure is there, they could not find it despite searching the entire station as they have not seen the code from the diamond ring yet. However, Rein gets captured as a member whose Sigil allows him to sniff out her scent alerts the gang of her presence, while Wang's Sigil allows him to teleport right in front of her, which her Sigil failed to predict. Wang threatens Rein to reveal the code on the diamond ring and Rein responds by telling a long story to buy some time for the rest of her clan to arrive. Kaname leads Rein to a safe place so that she could figure out the meaning of the code on the diamond ring, while Shuka, Sui, and Ryuji engage in battle against Wang and his gang. While hiding, Rein figures out that the code 185911 refers to November 1859 when Charles Darwin's book The Origin of Species was published. Meanwhile, Ryuji tries to distance himself from Wang having incorrectly deduced that his attacks are only effective from close range, and Wang uses his Sigil to attack Ryuji from behind and amputate his left hand. With Wang about to kill Ryuji, Kaname arrives with a proposal with Wang to let him have the key that he claims will unlock the door to the treasure in exchange for his life with Ryuji well aware that he is bluffing.
8	"Fragile"; Transliteration: "Furajairu" (Japanese: 平穏(フラジャイル))	Hideaki Kawamura	Shū Miyama	Daisuke Takashima	February 28, 2020
Ryuji reveals that his brother was killed by Wang and how he wanted revenge. Kaname's bluff succeeds as he distracts Wang by making him believe that there is a chance his key leads to the treasure so that he can take the treasure hidden in the coin locker without giving him a chance to react. It is then revealed that the key to the code is the number of digits as Darwin's book had nothing to do with Shibuya Station, and only the south exit coin locker passcodes use six-digit numbers at the station. The treasure is a call from the game master on a smartphone to grant Kaname one wish that is within their power. Kaname wishes to quit the game, but the request is denied and he is told that he can only quit by clearing the game or killing the game master. Instead, Kaname uses his wish for something that deters killing in the game. Two months pass since the event with the destruction in Shibuya officially ruled a terrorist attack. With Sui living at Shuka's apartment, Shuka decides to buy a house for the clan to live in. Suzune is visited in the hospital by Hideaki Kanehira, an insurance broker who is also a Darwin's Game player, presenting her with an insurance claim for her father's death, while Rein, who is recovering from a broken arm, becomes friends with her. Rein tells Suzune that she knows what happened to her father, but because Suzune is not a player, Rein cannot reveal the truth. Kaname spends the past two months training at the Danjo Boxing Club. As Kaede reattaches Ryuji's hand with her Sigil, Kaname requests to form an alliance with the Danjo Boxing Club, and Danjo wants him to prove his worth with a match against him with Sigil usage allowed. Meanwhile Kaname's classmate and friend Shinozuka pays a visit to Kaname's apartment while he is away, and he is kidnapped by Keiichi, who survived the hotel collapse.
9	"Heads Up"; Transliteration: "Hezzu Appu" (Japanese: 決闘(ヘッズアップ))	Yoshinobu Tokumoto	Shū Miyama	Yoshinobu Tokumoto	March 6, 2020
Kaname and Danjo have their match and despite having full use of his Sigil, none of his attacks made Danjo even use his Sigil. Danjo corners Kaname, but Kaname responds by using a flash grenade that makes Danjo use his Sigil that hardens his body thinking that he was going to be attacked by explosives. Having seen that Kaname is a capable leader, his clan forms an alliance with Kaname's newly-formed clan, Sunset Ravens. The duel is then interrupted by Liu Xuelan, the top player in Darwin's Game, as she uses her secret technique, Killing Intent, to make Kaname freeze while he feels a potential lethal attack from her in order to kidnap him. Xuelan takes him for a ride in a limo driven by her butler Ximing and demands Kaname to become the heir to her clan of assassins, but he refuses. The Sunset Ravens chase the limo in a Humvee and challenge Xuelan to a clan battle. After initially struggling, the Sunset Ravens manage to stop the limo by freezing the liquid from a bottle of booze with Sota's Sigil to destroy a tire. Xuelan surrenders when Ximing points out that she would have likely been killed by Shuka had the duel continued because of her limited mobility without the limo and the ineffectiveness of her techniques against Shuka. With the Sunset Ravens victorious, Xuelan decides to join the clan on the condition that if she is to kill anybody from the clan, Kaname will be first. Meanwhile, the Eighth uploads a video of Shinozuka held hostage with his fingers cut off with Wang demanding that he shows up to fight him.
10	"Old One"; Transliteration: "Ōrudo Wan" (Japanese: 旧王(オールドワン))	Daisuke Takashima	Shū Miyama	Usaku Myouchin	March 13, 2020
Having located the Eighth's hideout in a warehouse, Rein meets up with Kotori of the Icy Crown clan to ask for information about the current status of the Eighth. With the information, the Sunset Ravens and Inukai arrive at the warehouse. The police also arrive at the scene, but they are quickly slaughtered due to their lack of Sigils. Shuka delivers Shinozuka's smartphone with the app installed, and he joins Darwin's Game as requested by Kaname, gaining the power of telekinesis as his Sigil. Shinozuka uses his Sigil to fight back against the Eighths, but is totally helpless against Wang. As the Sunset Ravens begin their invasion, Inukai challenges Keiichi to a one-on-one match and reveals that Keiichi was a martial arts prodigy who quit the sport after accidentally killing an opponent, and felt enlightenment when Wang convinced him to become a killer. Kaname and Ryuji make their way into the warehouse demanding Wang to release Shinozuka, only to find him chopped up into pieces. With Kaname about to be shot by Shinji of the Eighths, Kaname kills him instead having decided that killing is necessary in this situation.
11	"Sunset Ravens"; Transliteration: "Sansetto Rēbenzu" (Japanese: 血盟(サンセットレーベンズ))	Daisuke Takashima	Shū Miyama	Daisuke Takashima	March 20, 2020
Having decided to kill the Eighth clan because of their murderous actions both inside and outside the game, Kaname challenges the Eighth to a clan battle against the Sunset Ravens. While Kaname and Ryuji dispatch the remaining Eighths, Shuka engages in a one-on-one duel with Wang. As Wang uses his Sigil that manipulates space to attack, Shuka activates her wire trap using her Sigil to sever his limbs one by one. In a desperate attempt to escape, Wang teleports outside the warehouse, but ends up in front of Kaname. Wang surrenders the battle unaware that Kaname used his High Roller privilege from the game master that forces the challenged clan to wager the same amount as the Sunset Ravens. With the Eighth out of points, Wang and Keiichi disappear. Feeling insulted by his final words for being called a poisonous insect, Kaname furiously shoots Wang as he disappears. Elsewhere, Oboro, having completed an assassination job, is contacted by the game master regarding Kaname's ascension. Some time later, the Sunset Ravens are shown in different parts of Shibuya hunting down other players attempting to take Shibuya as their territory after the Eight clan's elimination. They kill a good portion of them and leave enough survivors to spread the "message of fear" that the game is prohibited within the Sunset Raven's territory. In the epilogue, an angry Kaname begins the next event, a hunting game inside a forest.

=== Live-action film ===
A live-action film adaptation was announced on July 10, 2026. It will be directed by Fumihiko Sori, based on a screenplay by Hayato Miura and Sori. Toei Company will distribute the film. The film is set to premiere in March 12, 2027.

== Reception ==
The series had 10 million copies in circulation by January 2024.

Anime News Network had four editors review the first episode of the anime: James Beckett was critical of the premiere's "extended running time" being filled with "overdramatic slow motion shots and dubstep music" for a story that insists on its "edgy coolness" without being "exceptionally novel or interesting" besides emitting "hardcore Future Diary or Big Order vibes," calling it "a well-animated and decently directed slice of nothing, and it almost put me to sleep, making it the first show of the season I wholeheartedly recommend skipping." Theron Martin commended the episode for not having the "common hallmarks" that King's Game was riddled with by having "more interesting and immediately likable characters", and praised Yoshinobu Tokumoto for supplying the premise with a "techno and rock-based musical score, inventive scene framing and perspectives, and surprising good action animation". He noted that it gets bloody throughout the runtime, saying, "If you can handle that, though, then this series has more promise than I would have expected." Rebecca Silverman praised the premiere for elevating both "plot and production values" than other survival game stories, but was critical of several suspensions of disbelief moments throughout the runtime, concluding that: "If it is a genre you enjoy, however, this is definitely trying to put its best foot forward." Nick Creamer was positive towards the "efficient[ly] and energetic[ally]" pacing through the premise's rules and the battles having "dramatic appeal", highlighting the second fight for its "solid action animation" and "sense of urgency and discovery," but felt it was indistinguishable in terms of "worldbuilding or narrative setup" and the characterizations of both Kaname and Shuka, concluding that: "If you're a fan of battle royales, and characters like Shuka aren't a dealbreaker for you, I'd give it a shot."

== See also ==
- The Everyday Tales of a Cat God, another manga series by FLIPFLOPs
- The Lord Magear's Apprentice, another manga series by FLIPFLOPs
