= Overlord: The Sacred Kingdom =

2024 Japanese animated fantasy action film

- Theatrical release poster
- Kanji: 劇場版 オーバーロード 聖王国編
- Revised Hepburn: Gekijō-ban Ōbārōdo: Sei Ōkoku-hen
- Directed by: Naoyuki Itō
- Screenplay by: Naoyuki Itō
- Based on: Overlord by Kugane Maruyama (Note: Author) and So-bin (Note: Illustrator)
- Starring: Satoshi Hino; Yoshino Aoyama; Hitomi Nabatame
- Cinematography: Yoshio Watanabe
- Edited by: Mariko Tsukatsune
- Music by: Shūji Katayama
- Production companies: Kadokawa; Hakuhodo DY M&P; Madhouse; AT-X; NTT Docomo
- Distributed by: Kadokawa Animation
- Release dates: September 13, 2024 (IMAX); September 20, 2024 (Japan)
- Running time: 134 minutes
- Country: Japan
- Language: Japanese
- Box office: US$8.56 million

Overlord: The Sacred Kingdom (劇場版 オーバーロード 聖王国編, Gekijō-ban Ōbārōdo: Sei Ōkoku-hen; lit. 'Overlord the Movie: The Holy Kingdom Arc') is a 2024 Japanese animated dark-fantasy action film produced by Madhouse and distributed by Kadokawa Animation based on the Overlord light novel series written by Kugane Maruyama and illustrated by So-bin. Adapting the 12th and 13th light novel volumes, the film serves as a midquel to the anime television series adaptation's fourth season, which aired two years earlier in 2022. Announced in May 2021 alongside the pre-mentioned TV season, the film was released nationwide in Japan on September 20, 2024, after receiving an advanced IMAX screening one week earlier on September 13. The cast and staff reprised their roles from the anime series. The film's theme song is "Wheeler-Dealer", performed by OxT. Crunchyroll licensed the film for distribution outside of Asia and released it in select North American theaters on November 8, 2024.

== Premise ==
The Sacred Kingdom had enjoyed years of peace after the construction of an enormous wall protecting them from neighboring invasions. However, whatever was left of this prosperity suddenly comes to an abrupt end when the demon emperor Jaldabaoth arrives in the country with an army of villainous demi-humans. Fearing invasion of their own lands, the neighboring territory of the Slane Theocracy is forced to beg their enemies over from the Sorcerer Kingdom for assistance in fending off these invaders. Heeding the call, the sorcerer king Ains Ooal Gown rallies his kingdom and undead army to join the battle alongside the Sacred Kingdom and the Slane Theocracy in hopes of defeating a common enemy.

== Cast ==
Character	Japanese voice	English voice
Ainz Ooal Gown	Satoshi Hino	Chris Guerrero
Neia Baraja	Yoshino Aoyama	Sarah Wiedenheft
Remedios Custodio	Hitomi Nabatame	Corey Pettit
Gustav Montagnes	Hidenobu Kiuchi	Brent Mukai
Caspond Bessarez	Yūya Uchida	Bradley Gareth
Calca Bessarez	Saori Hayami	Kelly Greenshield
Kelart Custodio	Haruka Tomatsu	Molly Zhang
Evil Lord of Wrath	Satoshi Tsuruoka	Sean Letourneau
Demiurge	Masayuki Katō	Jeff Johnson
CZ Delta	Asami Seto	Michelle Rojas
Albedo	Yumi Hara	Elizabeth Maxwell
Beebeezee	Natsumi Fujiwara	Madeleine Morris
Beebeebee	Mika Kanda	Ezra Vervin
Halisha Ankara	Hiroshi Naka	Martin Cervantes
Vijar Rajandala	Ryōta Suzuki	Zac Loera
Nasrene Belt Cure	Akira Kuwabara	Erin Lundquist

== Reception ==
In November 2024, Overlord: The Sacred Kingdom earned $1.16 million in its U.S. opening weekend, ranking at #12 in the box office.

Phil Hoad of The Guardian gave the film 3/5 stars, writing, "At least in this instalment, we never see the real-world frame story outside the game, but there's a fatalistic sense that all this is being decided elsewhere. Coupled with expansive, heroic visual character-work, the film has a classiness that, with a bit more focus, could in future put it in Princess Mononoke territory." Randy Myers of The Mercury News gave it 3/4 stars, writing, "Director Naoyuki Itô obviously relishes classic world-building elements and oversees some rather astonishing visual set pieces. All the staples are there, too: bloody battles, surprising revelations and dormant powers within unlikely sources." IGN's Mike Mamon was more critical, calling the film "more of a footnote to a long-running anime series than it is an entertaining movie experience" and adding, "The arc that inspired the movie receives only a passing mention on the TV show; The Sacred Kingdom's lackluster execution makes that short shrift feel justified." He gave the film a score of 4/10.
