= Haruka Tomatsu =

Japanese voice actress (born 1990)

- 戸松 遥
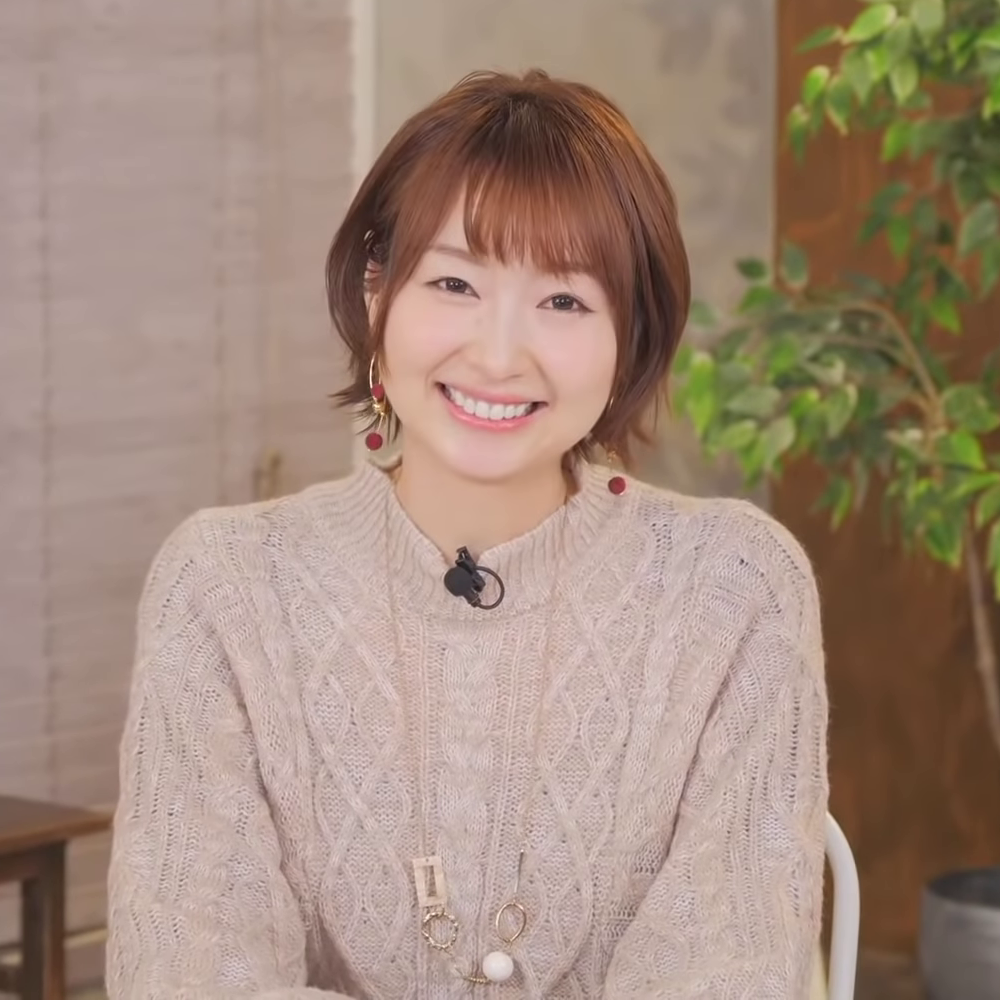
- Tomatsu in 2021
- Born: February 4, 1990 (age 36); Ichinomiya, Aichi, Japan
- Occupations: Actress; voice actress; singer
- Years active: 2004–present
- Agent: MusicRay'n
- Height: 165 cm (5 ft 5 in)
- Spouse: Unknown (m. 2019)
- Children: 2
- Musical career
- Genres: J-Pop; Anison
- Instrument: Vocals
- Years active: 2008–present
- Label: MusicRay'n
- Member of: Sphere
- Website: tomatsuharuka.com

Haruka Tomatsu (戸松 遥, Tomatsu Haruka; born February 4, 1990) is a Japanese actress and singer, employed by MusicRay'n. She received the Rookie of the Year award at the 3rd Seiyu Awards and the Synergy Award at the 9th Seiyu Awards. Tomatsu is known for voicing main heroines as Asuna Yuuki in Sword Art Online, Haru Okumura in Persona 5, Zero Two in Darling in the Franxx, Lala Satalin Deviluke in To LOVE-Ru, Kyoko Hori in Horimiya, Morgiana in Magi: The Labyrinth of Magic, Eleonora Viltaria in Lord Marksman and Vanadis and Naruko "Anaru" Anjo in Anohana.

Tomatsu began a singing career in 2008, performing the song "Naissance" which was used as the ending theme to the television drama series Here Is Greenwood. Her second single "Motto Hade ni Ne" was used as the opening theme to Kannagi: Crazy Shrine Maidens. In 2009, she became part of the music unit Sphere, alongside Aki Toyosaki, Minako Kotobuki and Ayahi Takagaki. She released her first album Rainbow Road in 2010, and two compilation albums in 2016.

== Career ==
=== Acting and Voice acting ===
Tomatsu was born in Ichinomiya, Aichi. Her voice acting career began when she participated in an audition held by Sony Music Entertainment Japan subsidiary Music Ray'n from 2005 to 2006. In January 2006, she participated in the Toho Cinderella Audition held by Tōhō Entertainment.

Tomatsu made her voice acting debut in 2007, playing a student in Gakuen Utopia Manabi Straight!. That same year, she played her first starring role as Corticarte Apa Lagranges in Shinkyoku Sōkai Polyphonica.

After graduating from high school, Tomatsu moved to Tokyo in 2008 to go to university and to continue her voice acting career. That same year, she played the roles of Shiho Sannomiya in Zettai Karen Children, Lala Satalin Deviluke in To Love-Ru, and Nagi in Kannagi: Crazy Shrine Maidens. She then made her live-action debut as Mieko Nitta in the drama series Here Is Greenwood. She also played the role of Ami Misaki in the television drama series RH Plus. She received the Rookie of the Year Award at the 3rd Seiyu Awards.

In 2012, Tomatsu played Asuna Yuuki in Sword Art Online. In 2013, she received the Best Supporting Actress Award at the 7th Seiyu Awards, and the Synergy Award for her role in Yo-Kai Watch at the 9th Seiyu Awards. In 2018, she appeared as herself in the television drama series Koe Girl!, which featured her as a voice actress taking care of the series' main characters; the series also featured footage from one of her concerts. She also played Zero Two in Darling in the Franxx. In 2021 she played Kyoko Hori in Hori-san to Miyamura-kun.

=== Music ===
Tomatsu performed the song "Sekai de Ichiban Yabai Koi" (世界で一番ヤバイ恋), which was used as the fourth ending theme for the series Kyōran Kazoku Nikki. Her next release was the song "Naissance", which was used as the ending theme to the drama series Here Is Greenwood. "Naissance", her first single, was released on September 3, 2008. Her second single and first anime-related single, "Motto Hade ni ne!" (motto☆派手にね!), was used as the opening theme to the anime television series Kannagi: Crazy Shrine Maidens; the single was released on October 28, 2009. Her third single "Musuhi no Toki" (産巣日の時) was released on November 26, 2008; the title track is used as the ending theme to Kannagi: Crazy Shrine Maidens.

In 2009, Music Ray'n formed the music unit Sphere, which consists of Tomatsu, Aki Toyosaki, Minako Kotobuki and Ayahi Takagaki. Her fourth single "Koi no Uta" (こいのうた) was released on May 13, 2009; the title track is used as the ending to the anime series Shinkyoku Sōkai Polyphonica S. This was followed by her fifth single "Girls, Be Ambitious", which was released on February 8, 2010; the title track is used as the ending theme to the anime series Sound of the Sky. She released her first solo album Rainbow Road on February 24, 2010; the album peaked at No. 15 on the Oricon weekly charts and charted for four weeks. She then released her sixth single "Nagisa no Shooting Star" (渚のSHOOTING STAR) on August 16, 2010. Her seventh single "Baby Baby Love", used as the ending theme to the 2010 anime television series Motto To Love-Ru, was released on November 3, 2010.

Her eighth single, "Oh My God", was released on July 25, 2011; the title track was used as the anime series Nekogami Yaoyorozu. This was followed by her ninth single "Yume Sekai" (ユメセカイ; lit. "Dream World") which was released on July 25, 2012; the title track was used as the first ending theme to the anime television series Sword Art Online. Her next release was her tenth single "Q&A Recital!" (Q&A リサイタル!) which was released on October 29, 2012. Her second solo album Sunny Side Story, released on January 16, 2013, peaked at No. 5 on the Oricon weekly charted and charted for five weeks.

Her eleventh single, "Pachi Pachi Party", was released on July 22, 2013, and her 12th single "Hikari Gift" (ヒカリギフト, Hikarigifuto) was released on January 27, 2014. She released her 13th single "Fantastic Soda!!" on August 11, 2014. This was followed by her 14th single "Courage", released on December 3, 2014, and used as the second opening theme to the anime television series Sword Art Online II. It became her best performing single to date, peaking at No. 4 on the Oricon weekly charts and charting for eleven weeks. Her third solo album Harukarisk*Land, released on March 18, 2015, peaked at No. 5 on the Oricon weekly charts and charted for four weeks.

Tomatsu released her fifteenth single "Step A Go! Go!" on October 12, 2015. This was followed by her sixteenth single "Cinderella Symphony" (シンデレラ☆シンフォニー), which was released on February 29, 2016. She then released two best albums titled Tomatsu Haruka Best Selection (Sunshine) (戸松遥 BEST SELECTION -sunshine-) and Tomatsu Haruka Best Selection (Starlight) (戸松遥 BEST SELECTION -starlight-) on June 15, 2016. In July 2016, as part of Sphere, she made her North American live debut at Anime Expo. Her seventeenth single "Monokuro/Two of Us" (モノクロ/Two of us) was released on November 7, 2016; the song "Two of Us" is used as the theme song to the video game Sword Art Online: Hollow Realization. Her eighteenth single, "Uchōten Traveller" (有頂天トラベラー), was released on October 23, 2017; the title track is used as the ending theme to the anime series PriPri Chi-chan!!. She released her fourth solo album Colorful Gift on May 14, 2018. Her 18th single "Try & Joy" was released on September 5, 2018. Her 19th single "Resolution" was released digitally on October 13, 2019, and received a physical release on November 20, 2019; the title song is used as the third opening theme to the anime series Sword Art Online: Alicization. She and her Oresuki co-stars sang the song "Hanakotoba", which was used as the series' ending theme.

== Personal life ==
Tomatsu announced her marriage on her blog on January 11, 2019. She gave birth to her first child, a daughter, on February 9, 2021. On May 20, 2025, she gave birth to her second child.

== Filmography ==
=== Anime ===
Year	Title	Role	Notes
2007	Bokurano	Futaba Yamura	
2007	Engage Planet Kiss Dum	Mayura	Episode 1
2007	Les Misérables: Shōjo Cosette	Audrey	
2007	Moetan	Sumi Kuroi	
2007	Shinkyoku Sōkai Polyphonica	Corticarte Apa Lagranges	First main role in a TV anime series
2007	Sky Girls	Yayoi Makihara	
2008	Hell Girl: Three Vessels	Hidemi Kashiwagi	
2008	Kannagi: Crazy Shrine Maidens	Nagi	
2008	Kemeko Deluxe!	M.M.	
2008	Kyōran Kazoku Nikki	Senko Himemiya/Chika Midarezaki	
2008	Mobile Suit Gundam 00 Second Season	Mileina Vashti	
2008	Mōryō no Hako	Kanako Yuzuki	
2008	Shina Dark	Garlet Fey Sowauge	
2008	To Love Ru	Lala Satalin Deviluke	
2008	Zettai Karen Children	Shiho Sannomiya	
2009	You're Under Arrest: Full Throttle Season 3	Kaori Takano	
2009	A Certain Scientific Railgun	Kinuho Wannai	
2009	Asura Cryin'	Misao Minakami	
2009	Basquash!	Rouge	
2009	Canaan	Yunyun	
2009	Cross Game	Aoba Tsukishima	
2009	GA Geijutsuka Art Design Class	Yamaguchi Kisaragi	
2009	Modern Magic Made Simple	Yumiko Cristina Ichinose	
2009	Nyan Koi!	Akari Kirishima, Kotone Kirishima	
2009	Polyphonica Crimson S	Corticarte Apa Lagranges	
2009	Samurai Harem: Asu no Yoichi	Ayame Ikaruga	
2009	Sora no Manimani	Hime Makita	
2009	Student Council's Discretion	Miyashiro Kanade	
2009	White Album	Mizuki Mana	
2010	Asobi ni Iku yo!	Manami Kinjō	
2010	Demon King Daimao	Eiko Teruya	
2010	Durarara!!	Rio Kamichika	
2010	Inazuma Eleven	Kudou Fuyuka	
2010	Katanagatari	Princess Hitei	
2010	Ladies versus Butlers!	Hedyeh	
2010	Mitsudomoe	Hitoha Marui	
2010	Motto To Love Ru	Lala Satalin Deviluke	
2010	Otome Yōkai Zakuro	Byakuroku	
2010	Shiki	Megumi Shimizu	
2010	Sound of the Sky	Maria	Tomatsu is the singer of the ED 'Girls, Be Ambitious'
2010	Star Driver	Matsuri Hyou	
2010	Tatakau Shisho	Noloty Maruchie	
2011	Anohana	Naruko Anjō	
2011	Beelzebub	Angelica, Yuka Hanazawa	
2011	C: The Money of Soul and Possibility Control	Mashu	
2011	Hanasaku Iroha	Yuina Wakura	
2011	Inazuma Eleven GO	Shinsuke Nishizono	
2011	Mitsudomoe Zoryochu!	Hitoha Marui	
2011	Nekogami Yaoyorozu	Mayu	
2011	Softenni	Yayoi Hiragishi/Uzuki Hiragishi	
2011	The Idolmaster	Ai Hidaka	Episode 10
2011	Working'!!	Mitsuki Mashiba	
2012	Accel World	Megumi Wakamiya	
2012	Bodacious Space Pirates	Gruier Serenity	
2012	Good Luck Girl!	Ranmaru Rindou	
2012	Inazuma Eleven GO: Chrono Stone	Shinsuke Nishizono	
2012	Kokoro Connect	Nana Nishino	
2012	Magi: The Labyrinth of Magic	Morgiana	
2012	My Little Monster	Shizuku Mizutani	
2012	Natsuiro Kiseki	Yuka Hanaki	
2012	Queen's Blade Rebellion	Tarnyang	
2012	Sword Art Online	Asuna Yuuki	Tomatsu is the singer of the ED 'Yume Sekai'
2012	To Love Ru Darkness	Lala Satalin Deviluke	
2012	Waiting in the Summer	Ichika Takatsuki	
2013	A Certain Scientific Railgun S	Kinuho Wannai	
2013	Coppelion	Ibara Naruse	
2013	Hyakka Ryōran: Samurai Bride	Mataemon Araki	
2013	Magi: The Kingdom of Magic	Morgiana	
2013	Maoyu	Older Sister Maid	
2013	My Teen Romantic Comedy SNAFU	Kaori Orimoto	
2013	Pocket Monsters XY	Jessica	
2013	Pretty Rhythm: Rainbow Live	Bell Renjōji	
2013	Samurai Flamenco	Mari Maya	
2013	The World God Only Knows: Goddesses	Lune	
2013	Unlimited Psychic Squad	Shiho Sannomiya	
2013	Valvrave the Liberator	Saki Rukino	
2013	Wanna Be the Strongest in the World	Rio Kazama	
2013	Yozakura Quartet ~Hana no Uta~	Kishi Tōka	
2014	HappinessCharge PreCure!	Iona Hikawa/Cure Fortune	
2014	Inazuma Eleven GO Galaxy	Neol Lotts, Shinsuke Nishizono	
2014	Lord Marksman and Vanadis	Eleonora Viltaria	
2014	Sakura Trick	Haruka Takayama	
2014	Sword Art Online II	Asuna Yuuki	Tomatsu is the singer of the 2nd OP 'Courage'
2014	The Irregular at Magic High School	Sayaka Mibu	
2014	Wake Up, Girls!	Karina	
2014	Yo-Kai Watch	Keita Amano	
2015	Absolute Duo	Imari Nagakura	
2015	Durarara!!x2	Rio Kamichika	
2015	Gate	Piña Co Lada	
2015	Gintama	Ginko Sakata	Genderswapped form of Gintoki Sakata appearing in the Dekobokko Arc (Episodes 275–277)
2015	Is It Wrong to Try to Pick Up Girls in a Dungeon?	Eina Tulle	
2015	Mikagura School Suite	Nyamirin	
2015	My Teen Romantic Comedy SNAFU TOO!	Kaori Orimoto	
2015	Punch Line	Rabura Chichibu	
2015	To Love Ru Darkness 2nd	Lala Satalin Deviluke	
2015	Tokyo Ghoul √A	Nashiro Yasuhisa	
2015	Working!!!	Mitsuki Mashiba	
2015	Yo-Kai Watch Season 2	Keita Amano	
2016	Gate 2nd Season	Piña Co Lada	
2016	Grimgar of Fantasy and Ash	Mutsumi	
2016	Matoi the Sacred Slayer	Claris Tonitolus	
2016	Mobile Suit Gundam Unicorn RE:0096	Micott Bartsch	
2016	Sweetness and Lightning	Shinobu Kojika	
2016	ReLIFE	Rena Kariu	
2016	Terraformars Revenge	Yuriko Minamoto	
2016	The Disastrous Life of Saiki K.	Kuriko/Kusuko Saiki	Female form of Kusuo Saiki
2016	Time Travel Girl	Akira Hayase	
2016	WWW.Working!!	Hana Miyakoshi	
2017	Our love has always been 10 centimeters apart	Natsuki Enomoto	
2017	Scum's Wish	Sanae Ebato	
2017	The Saga of Tanya the Evil	Mary Sioux	
2017	Tsuredure Children	Hotaru Furuya	
2017	Two Car	Misaki Nagai	
2018	Darling in the Franxx	Code:002	
2018	Goblin Slayer	Sword Master	
2018	Inazuma Eleven: Ares no Tenbin	Hanta Hattori, Akane Miyano	
2018	Inazuma Eleven: Orion no Kokuin	Hanta Hattori	
2018	Persona 5: The Animation	Haru Okumura	
2018	Pocket Monsters: Sun & Moon	Mina	
2018	Sword Art Online: Alicization	Asuna Yuuki	
2018	Violet Evergarden	Iris Cannary	
2019	Demon Lord, Retry!	Killer Queen	
2019	Fruits Basket	Aritamis Donpanina Taios	
2019	How Clumsy you are, Miss Ueno	Kitanaga	
2019	How Heavy Are the Dumbbells You Lift?	Rumika Aina	
2019	Miru Tights	Ren Aikawa	ONA
2019	O Maidens in Your Savage Season	Sonoe Jūjō	
2019	Oresuki	Sumireko "Pansy" Sanshokuin	
2019	Sword Art Online: Alicization – War of Underworld	Asuna Yuuki	
2019	Wasteful Days of High School Girls	Akane "Wota" Kikuchi	
2019	Yatogame-chan Kansatsu Nikki	Monaka Yatogame	
2020	A Certain Scientific Railgun T	Kinuho Wannai	
2020	Beyblade Burst Superking	Hikaru Asahi	Main Cast alongside Hyūga Asahi
2020	Yatogame-chan Kansatsu Nikki 2 Satsume	Monaka Yatogame	
2021	Horimiya	Kyoko Hori	
2021	Idoly Pride	Rio Kanzaki	
2021	Peach Boy Riverside	Winny	
2021	Re:Zero − Starting Life in Another World 2nd Season	Fortuna	
2021	Suppose a Kid from the Last Dungeon Boonies Moved to a Starter Town	Mena	
2021	Yatogame-chan Kansatsu Nikki 3 Satsume	Monaka Yatogame	
2021	Yo-kai Watch Jam - Yo-kai Academy Y: Close Encounters of the N Kind	Fubuki Himekawa	
2022	Call of the Night	Seri Kikyō	
2022	Cardfight!! Vanguard will+Dress	Yurina Nukata	
2022	Girls' Frontline	M4A1	
2022	Shaman King	Teruko Amano	
2022	Uncle from Another World	Tsundere Elf/Suzailgiererzegalnelvzegilreagranzelga Elga	
2022	Yatogame-chan Kansatsu Nikki 4 Satsume	Monaka Yatogame	
2023	Ayakashi Triangle	Yayoi Toba	
2023	Horimiya: The Missing Pieces	Kyouko Hori	
2023	Insomniacs After School	Yui Shiromaru	
2023	Saint Cecilia and Pastor Lawrence	Mel	
2023	The Most Heretical Last Boss Queen	Tiara	
2024	A Journey Through Another World	Sylphyleel	
2024	As a Reincarnated Aristocrat, I'll Use My Appraisal Skill to Rise in the World	Fahm	
2024	Grendizer U	Teronna Aqua Vega, Rubina Beryl Vega	
2024	Negative Positive Angler	Ice	
2024	Rurouni Kenshin: Kyoto Disturbance	Yumi Komagata	
2024	Seirei Gensouki: Spirit Chronicles 2nd Season	Satsuki Sumeragi	
2024	Sound! Euphonium 3	Mayu Kuroe	
2025	My Happy Marriage Season 2	Kaoruko Jinnouchi	
2025	I'm a Noble on the Brink of Ruin, So I Might as Well Try Mastering Magic	Asuna Aquage	
2026	Kaya-chan Isn't Scary	Nana Ebisumori	

=== Films ===
Year	Title	Role	Note
2010	Mobile Suit Gundam 00 the Movie: A Wakening of the Trailblazer	Mileina Vashti	
2011	Un-Go Episode 0: Inga Chapter	Yuuko Kurata	
2012	After School Midnighters	Mako	
2012	Inazuma Eleven GO vs. Danbōru Senki W	Shinsuke Nishizono	
2013	Sword Art Online: Extra Edition	Asuna Yuuki	
2013	Zyuden Sentai Kyoryuger: Gaburincho of Music	Canderilla	Live-action film; voice
2014	Santa Company	Mint	
2014	HappinessCharge PreCure! the Movie: The Ballerina of the Land of Dolls	Iona Hikawa/Cure Fortune	
2014	Yo-Kai Watch the Movie: The Secret is Created, Nyan!	Keita Amano	
2014	Zyuden Sentai Kyoryuger vs. Go-Busters: The Great Dinosaur Battle! Farewell Our Eternal Friends	Canderilla	Live-action film; voice
2014	Zyuden Sentai Kyoryuger Returns: 100 Years After	Canderilla	Live-action film; voice, human form
2015	Pretty Cure All Stars: Spring Carnival	Iona Hikawa/Cure Fortune	
2015	Yo-Kai Watch: Enma Daiō to Itsutsu no Monogatari da Nyan!	Keita Amano	
2015	Ressha Sentai ToQger vs. Kyoryuger: The Movie	Canderilla	Live-action film; voice
2016	Pretty Cure All Stars: Singing with Everyone Miraculous Magic	Iona Hikawa/Cure Fortune	
2016	Zutto Mae Kara Suki Deshita	Natsuki Enomoto	
2016	Suki ni Naru Sono Shunkan o	Natsuki Enomoto	
2016	Yo-kai Watch: Soratobu Kujira to Double no Sekai no Daibōken da Nyan!	Keita Amano	
2017	Sword Art Online The Movie: Ordinal Scale	Asuna Yuuki	
2017	Magical Girl Lyrical Nanoha Reflection	Amitie Florian	
2018	The Seven Deadly Sins the Movie: Prisoners of the Sky	Ellatte	
2018	Magical Girl Lyrical Nanoha Detonation	Amitie Florian	
2018	Zyuden Sentai Kyoryuger 「Brave 33.5: This is Brave! Battle Frontier」	Canderilla	
2018	Hug! Pretty Cure Futari wa Pretty Cure: All Stars Memories	Iona Hikawa/Cure Fortune	
2019	The Saga of Tanya the Evil	Mary Sioux	
2019	Blackfox	Mia	
2019	Yo-kai Watch Jam the Movie: Yo-Kai Academy Y - Can a Cat be a Hero?	Fubuki Himekawa	
2021	Sword Art Online Progressive: Aria of a Starless Night	Asuna Yuuki	
2022	Teasing Master Takagi-san: The Movie	Ōta	
2022	Break of Dawn	Wako Kishi	
2022	Sword Art Online Progressive: Scherzo of Deep Night	Asuna Yuuki	
2024	Crayon Shin-chan: Ora's Dinosaur Diary	Angela	
2024	Mononoke the Movie: Phantom in the Rain	Botan Ōtomo	
2024	Overlord: The Sacred Kingdom	Kelart Custodio	
2025	Mononoke the Movie: The Ashes of Rage	Botan Ōtomo	
2026	Witch on the Holy Night	Aoko Aozaki	
2028	Sword Art Online the Movie: Integral Domain	Asuna Yuuki	

=== Original video animation (OVA) ===
Year	Title	Role	Note
2007	Ichigo Mashimaro	Female student	
2008	To Love Ru	Lala Satalin Deviluke	
2008	You're Under Arrest: Full Throttle	Kaori Takano	
2010	Air Gear: Kuro no Hane to Nemuri no Mori	Ringo Noyamano	
2010	Zettai Karen Children OVA	Shiho Sannomiya	
2010	Mobile Suit Gundam Unicorn	Micott Bartsch	
2011	Baby Princess 3D Paradise 0	Hikaru	
2012	Sword Art Online	Asuna Yuuki	
2012	To Love Ru Darkness	Lala Satalin Deviluke	
2014	Waiting in the Summer OVA	Ichika Takatsuki	
2016	To Love Ru Darkness 2nd	Lala Satalin Deviluke	
2018	ReLIFE	Rena Kariu	
2020	Oresuki: Oretachi no Game Set	Sumireko "Pansy" Sanshokuin	

=== Video games ===
Year	Title	Role	Notes	Ref
2008	Harvest Moon DS: Grand Bazaar	Antoinette, Cindy		
2009	Arc Rise Fantasia	Cecille		
2009	The Idolmaster Dearly Stars	Ai Hidaka		
2009	Rune Factory 3: A Fantasy Harvest Moon	Ion		
2010	Valkyria Chronicles II	Aliasse		
2010	Blaze Union: Story to Reach the Future	Cerica		
2011	Corpse Party: Book of Shadows	Mitsuki Yamamoto		
2011	Magical Girl Lyrical Nanoha A's: The Gears of Destiny	Lily Strosek, Amitie Florian		
2012	Beyond the Labyrinth	Female Protagonist		
2012	Chaos Rings II	Marie Crichton		
2012	Girl Friend Beta	Nonoka Sasahara		
2012–	Sword Art Online (series)	Asuna Yuuki		
2013	Digimon World Re:Digitize Decode	Rina Shinomiya		
2014	Dengeki Bunko: Fighting Climax	Asuna		
2014	J-Stars Victory VS	Lala Satalin Deviluke		
2014	Final Fantasy Agito	Miyu Kagerohi		
2014	Fatal Frame: Maiden of Black Water	Haruka Momose		
2014	Granblue Fantasy	Feena		
2015	Digimon Story: Cyber Sleuth	Rina Shinomiya		
2015	Megadimension Neptunia VII	C-Sha		
2016	Breath of Fire 6	Peridot		
2016	Fate/Grand Order	Minamoto no Yorimitsu		
2016	Girls' Frontline	M4A1, Walther WA 2000, Lee-Enfield		
2016	Persona 5	Haru Okumura, Milady (Persona awakening voice)		
2018	Dragalia Lost	Xuan Zang		
2018	Food Fantasy	Tteokbokki		
2018	God Eater 3	Claire Victorious		
2019	Super Smash Bros. Ultimate	Haru Okumura	DLC	
2019	Persona 5 Royal	Haru Okumura		
2019	Punishing Gray Raven	Karenina		
2020	Persona 5 Strikers	Haru Okumura		
2020	Crash Fever	Innes		
2020	Arena of Valor	Asuna Yuuki (skin)		
2021	Idoly Pride	Rio Kanzaki		
2021	Identity V	Galatea Claude/Sculptor		
2021	Alchemy Stars	Dove, Vivian		
2021	Arknights	Saileach		
2021	Tsukihime -A piece of blue glass moon-	Aoko Aozaki		
2022	Melty Blood: Type Lumina	Aoko Aozaki		
2022	A Certain Magical Index: Imaginary Fest	Kinuho Wannai		
2022	Koumajou Remilia: Scarlet Symphony	Alice Margatroid		
2022	Witch on the Holy Night	Aoko Aozaki		
2022	Tower of Fantasy	Nemesis, Shirli		
2022	Goddess of Victory: Nikke	Mary		
2023	Persona 5 Tactica	Haru Okumura		
2024	Azur Lane	Sovetsky Soyuz		
2024	Girls' Frontline 2: Exilium	Makiatto		
2025	Kantai Collection	Dace, Thonburi		
2026	Honkai: Star Rail	Nihilux		
2026	Wuthering Waves	Hiyuki		
2026	Genshin Impact	Anastasya Feodorovna Snezhnaya		

=== Television drama ===
Year	Title	Role	Network	Notes
2008	RH Plus	Ami Misaki	JAITS	
2008	Here Is Greenwood	Mieko Nitta	Tokyo MX	
2012	Dokurogeki 2	Noriko Kawaguchi	Fuji TV	
2013	Zyuden Sentai Kyoryuger	Canderilla	TV Asahi	Voice and human form
2014	Hana Moyu	Moyurun	NHK	Voice; PR character
2018	Koe Girl!	Herself	TV Asahi	
2023	Ohsama Sentai King-Ohger	Canderilla	TV Asahi	Voice
2024	Wing-man	The Shiva	TV Tokyo	

=== Drama CDs ===
- Aion – Seine Miyazaki
- Kyōran Kazoku Nikki – Senko Himemiya/Chika Midarezaki
- Shinako-i drama CD (しなこいっドラマCD) – Reiko Ibata
- To Love Ru – Lala Satalin Deviluke
- Twinkle Stars – Sakuya Shiina
- Hanikami, Kanojo wa Koi o Suru ～ Hana Mihen – Satsuki Myoga

=== Dubbing ===
==== Live-action ====
Title	Role	Dubbing actor	Notes	Source
100 Things to Do Before High School	CJ Martin	Isabela Moner		
Alien: Romulus	Rain Carradine	Cailee Spaeny		
Bates Motel	Bradley Martin	Nicola Peltz		
Dessau Dancers	Matti	Sonja Gerhardt		
Evil Dead	Natalie	Elizabeth Blackmore		
Final Cut	Ava	Matilda Lutz		
Forbidden Games	Paulette	Brigitte Fossey	New Era Movies edition	
Genius	Geneviève Aliquot	Stéphane Caillard		
Gossip Girl	Audrey Hope	Emily Alyn Lind		
The Northman	Olga of the Birch Forest	Anya Taylor-Joy		
Power Rangers Dino Force Brave	Canderilla			
Power Rangers Mystic Force	Madison Rocca/Blue Mystic Ranger	Melanie Vallejo		
Scream 4	Olivia Morris	Marielle Jaffe		
Sucker Punch	Rocket	Jena Malone		
We Are Lady Parts	Ayesha	Juliette Motamed		

==== Animation ====
Title	Role	Source
DC Super Hero Girls	Wonder Woman	
Isle of Dogs	Tracy Walker	
Oni: Thunder God's Tale	Um Brella	
Smurfs: The Lost Village	Smurfblossom	

== Discography ==
=== Albums ===
- Rainbow Road (2010)
- Sunny Side Story (2013)
- Harukarisk＊Land (2015)
- Best Selection ~Starlight/Sunshine~ (2016)
- Best Selection ~Starlight~ (2016)
- Best Selection ~Sunshine~ (2016)
- Colorful Gift (2018)

=== Singles ===
- "Mahō Shōjo Magical-tan" (魔法少女マジカルたん!) (July 25, 2007) (Moetan Opening theme)
- "Naissance" (September 3, 2008)
- "Motto Hade Ni Ne!" (October 29, 2008) (Kannagi: Crazy Shrine Maidens Opening theme)
- "Musuhi no Toki" (November 26, 2008) (Kannagi: Crazy Shrine Maidens Ending theme)
- "Koi no Uta" (May 13, 2009) (Shinkyoku Sōkai Polyphonica Crimson S Ending theme)
- "Girls, Be Ambitious" (January 27, 2010) (Sound of the Sky Ending theme)
- "Nagisa no Shooting Star" (August 4, 2010)
- "Monochrome" (October 3, 2010) (Star Driver Insert song)
- "Baby Baby Love" (March 11, 2011) (Motto To Love-Ru Ending theme)
- "Oh My God" (July 13, 2011) (Nekogami Yaoyorozu Ending theme)
- "Yume Sekai" (July 25, 2012) (Sword Art Online Ending theme)
- "Q&A Recital!" (October 17, 2012) (My Little Monster Opening theme)
- "My Independent Destiny" (2012) (Sword Art Online Character song as Asuna Yuuki)
- "White Flower Garden" (2012) (Sword Art Online Character song as Asuna Yuuki)
- "Pachi Pachi Party" (July 10, 2013)
- "Hikari Gift" (January 15, 2014)
- "Fantastic Soda!!" (July 30, 2014)
- "Holy Lonely Justice" HappinessCharge PreCure! (Cure Fortune Character Song)
- "Get Music!" Pretty Rhythm Rainbow Live (Bell (Beru) Renjouji Character Song)
- "Courage" (December 3, 2014) (Sword Art Online II 2nd opening theme)
- "STEP A GO! GO!" (September 30, 2015)
- "Cinderella ☆ Symphony" (シンデレラ☆シンフォニー) (February 17, 2016)
- "Monokuro / Two of Us" (October 26, 2016)
- "Ubiquitous dB -special ver.-" (feat. Rina Hidaka) (2017) (Sword Art Online Ordinal Scale Song As Asuna Yuuki)
- "Uchouten Traveler" (有頂天トラベラー) (October 11, 2017) (PriPri Chi-chan! 3rd ending theme)
- "TRY & JOY" (September 5, 2018)
