= List of Shinkyoku Sōkai Polyphonica characters =

Shinkyoku Sōkai Polyphonica is a visual novel game, light novel and anime series that features a cast of characters originally created by the Ocelot game company. The anime adaptation includes characters from the original Crimson series games as well as other titles as well as some exclusive characters.

== Crimson series characters ==
The characters interact at the Torvas Divine Song Players Academy (トルバス神曲学院, Torubasu Shinkyoku Gakuin).^{Ep. 4}

Phoron (フォロン, Pholon)
Voiced by: Tatsuya Kohashi (game), Hiroshi Kamiya (anime)
Tatara Phoron (タタラ・フォロン, Tatara Foron) is the player character of the Crimson video game series. He has brown hair tied in a short ponytail and blue eyes. In the video game, he is a student at Torvas where he aspires to become a Dantist. He is very kind, but naive and somewhat dense. He is the contract master of Corticarte Apa Lagranges, whom he met when he was a boy. He plays an organ-like instrument as his One-Man Orchestra. In the anime series, he is a Dantist working at Office Tsuge. His motorbike can partly transform into his One-Man Orchestra, but he also uses a portable backpack version.^{Ep. 1} Thinking his encounter with Coatie was a dream, he later learns that he is Coatie's master during his academy years when he sang a Divine Song that freed Coatie from being imprisoned in the academy's basement.^{Ep. 4} His anime profile describes him as calm and sometimes weak.
Coathicarte (コーティカルテ, Kōtikarute)
Voiced by: Riko Hirai (game), Haruka Tomatsu (anime)
Coathicarte Apa Lagranges (コーティカルテ・アパ・ラグランジェス, Kōtikarute Apa Raguranjesu) is Phoron's contract spirit who appears as a petite girl with red hair, brown eyes, and a large black bow.^{Ep. 1} Coatie, as Phoron calls her, has six wings and has many titles including Red Elder Spirit,^{Ep. 1} Red Goddess,^{Ep. 1} Crimson Annihilator,^{ep. 3} and Bloody Duchess. She was entranced by the young Phoron's singing voice and thus decided to make a pact with him so he would be hers and hers only.^{Ep. 1, 2} When Phoron plays or sings a Divine Song, she transforms into a full-figured woman with enormous power.^{Ep. 1} In the origins episode, she had also been imprisoned in the academy's basement until Phoron as a student inadvertently releases her with a Divine Song.^{Ep. 4} In Shinkyoku Soukai Polyphonica Crimson S, she has eight wings and is called 'Crimson Queen'. Coatie can be very moody around Phoron, often questioning his actions, and getting possessive of Phoron when he attracts the affections of other girls.^{Ep. 2} In the video game, she is dressed in a school uniform and often quarrels with Pelselthe. In the anime, she is shown to initiate closer contact with Phoron such as holding hands. She was contracted with Kuchiba Kaoru in the past.
Pelselthe (ペルセルテ, Peruserute)
Voiced by: Michi Tanaka (game), Nana Mizuki (anime)
Yugiri Pelselthe (ユギリ・ペルセルテ, Yugiri Peruserute) is the elder of the twin Yugiri sisters who attend the academy. She has golden blonde hair styled in twin tails and brown eyes. In the video game, she is a first-year student and is described as energetic. She has a thing for Divine Song players in general and Phoron in particular, even going so far as to compete with Coatie for his affections.^{Ep. 6} In the anime series, she and her sister work part-time at Office Tsuge while attending school. Her nickname is Pelse.^{Ep. 1, 4}
Prinesica (プリネシカ, Purineshika)
Voiced by: Tsubasa Yu (game), Rina Sato (anime)
Yugiri Prinesica (ユギリ・プリネシカ, Yugiri Purineshika) is the younger of the Yugiri twins. She has long silver-colored hair and brown eyes. Unlike her energetic sister, she is calm and quiet, and has a frail body. She likes to watch over her sister. In the video game, she is also a first-year student at the academy. Her nickname is Prine (プリネ, Purine). In the anime series, she and Pelse work part-time at Office Tsuge while attending school. It is revealed in the storyline that she is no longer fully human because when she was a child, she almost died in a terrible accident. Her father's contract spirit Dorislae saved Prinesca's life by fusing herself with Prine.^{Ep. 8} This also changed her hair color.^{Ep. 8}
Eufinley (ユフィンリー, Yufinrī)
Voiced by: Keiko Suzuki (game), Ayako Kawasumi (anime)
Eufinley is introduced in the video game as a senior student at the academy; in the anime flashback episode, she has a senior when Phoron was a sophomore.^{Ep. 4} She has short purple hair with a piece that goes down the middle of her forehead, and brown eyes, and is described as a genius girl with outstanding qualities. She plays a violin-like instrument.^{Ep. 5} In the anime series, she goes by the name Tsuge Eufinley (ツゲ・ユフィンリー, Tsuge Yufinrī), and she is the boss of Office Tsuge, Divine Song Players Management Group.^{Ep. 1} She has a contract with two spirits: Yardy and Mashat. In the anime, her contract spirit is just Yardy. In Shinkyoku Sōkai Polyphonica Crimson S, she wears her hair in a ponytail. She makes a contract with a 4-winged wolf spirit named Wolfis and plays a major part in fighting against the enemy.
Rembart (レンバルト, Rembelt)
Voiced by: Ryūichi Kubota (game), Katsuyuki Konishi (anime)
Phoron's best friend. In the video game, he is a talented honors student at the academy. He has light brown hair and green eyes. In the anime series, he is Phoron's co-worker at Office Tsuge and goes by the name Rembart Psyche (サイキ・レンバルト, Saiki Renbaruto) He plays a saxophone-like instrument, and is usually seen with small two-winged fairies.^{Ep. 2} He has not made a contract with a spirit. He is also a capable cook.^{Ep. 6}
Danguisu (ダングイス)
Voiced by: Moriyuki Hishida (game), Shintaro Asanuma
Phoron's classmate. He has brown hair and purple eyes. He thinks highly of himself.
Academy Director (学院長, Gakuin-chō)
Voiced by: Akira Ishida (game), Sho Hayami (anime)
The director at Torvas. He has long blond hair and green eyes. He has a youthful appearance that makes him look like a student. In the Crimson S anime series, his name is Shidara Leitos.

Leica (ライカ, Raika)
Voiced by: Akari Sasaki (game), Kumi Sakuma (anime)
A mysterious woman who appears at the school. She has long purple hair and purple eyes.

Burgess (バルゲス, Barugesu)
Voiced by: Hikaru Murasaki
Danguisu's contract spirit who appears as a raccoon like creature.

== Black series characters ==
The Black series features a new set of game characters and takes place in the same world as the main Crimson series, when the twins were still prospective students.

Managariastinockle Lagu Edraikerius (マナガリアスティノークル・ラグ・エデュライケリアス, Managariasutinōkuru Ragu Eduraikeriasu)
Voiced by: Akio Ōtsuka (game), Jūrōta Kosugi (anime)^{Ep. 7}
Managa is a main character in the Black series. He is a police officer spirit who works for the Lesciazrus Municipal Police in their psychiatric department. He has a large body, but is fairly gentle. He is the contract spirit partner to Matia. In the Polyphonica anime series, he and Matia chase down Dawson for taking one of the instruments.^{Ep. 7} He later appears in the final story arc involving the Counterfeit Orchestra.^{Ep. 11–12}

Machiya Matia (マチヤ・マティア)
Voiced by: Kiyomi Asai (game), Minori Chihara (anime)^{Ep. 7}
Matia is the heroine of the Black series, she is a silent girl with long black hair, black eyes, and a black cape. She works at the police station with Managa, who is her contract spirit, making her the Dantist. Her instrument is a blues harp. In the anime series, she appeared in episode 7 where she and Managa chase down Yanma Dawson for taking one of the one-man orchestra instruments.^{Ep. 7} She later appears in the final story arc involving the Counterfeit Orchestra.^{Ep. 11–12}

Saji Sherika (サジ・シェリカ)
Voiced by: Aoi Maki
A homeless child with blonde hair and blue eyes.
Ide Tigurea (イデ・ティグレア)
Voiced by: Yu Kamonomiya
Matia's doctor at the hospital. She is a surgeon. She has brown hair.
Yaguni Aguratto (ヤグニ・アグラット)
Voiced by: Toshihiro Nakamura
A research chief at Mikana Laboratory, Omitech Company. He has brown hair and wears glasses.
Wonaria Genika Yakuritore (ウォナーリア・ゲニカ・ヤクリトーレ, U~onāria genika yakuritōre)
Voiced by: Kyoko Hikami
Yaguni's executive secretary. She has green hair and green eyes.

== White series characters ==
Snow Drop (スノウドロップ, Sunou Doroppu)
Voiced by: Eri Kitamura (game)
Snow is a heroine in the White series as the Dantist for Blanca. She has purple hair styled in twin tails and wears purple glasses over her brown eyes. She has a strong sense of justice and does not like to lose. Her instrument is a contrabass named Eternal White. When she was young, she was taken in as a personal maid for Primrose. She attends Seireijima Music Conservatory (精霊島音楽院, Seirei-jima ongaku-in).

Blanca (ブランカ, Buranka)
Voiced by: Hikaru Midorikawa (game), Katsuyuki Konishi (anime)
Eliphas Blanca Albiona (エリファス・ブランカ・アルビオーナ, Erifasu Buranka Arubiōna) is Snow Drop's contract spirit. He has white hair and green eyes. His nickname is the White Holy Beast. He has six wings, and is very inspiring and confident. He can transform into a dog or a puppy. He likes umeboshi (pickled plums), and has a brief appearance in the anime's sixth episode where Phoron and Rembart are looking for a runaway cat, and he asks if they like pickled plums.^{Ep. 6}
Primrose (プリムローズ, Purimurōzu)
Voiced by: Mikiko Kurihara
Primrose is the girl who took in Snow Drop when she was young. She has long blond hair and green eyes, and is about the same age as Snow Drop. She is described as gentle and elegant, but harbors a dark side. She plays violin and piano, and is the daughter of a prominent family of Dantists. She and Snow are best friends, yet also rivals.
Daisy (デイジー, Deijī)
Voiced by: Akiko Yamamoto
A classmate of Primrose who has good grades and is into all sorts of sports. She isn't as powerful as a Dantist though.
Piece (ピース, Pīsu)
Voiced by: Yuta Kasuya
Daisy's childhood friend and spirit partner. He has blue hair and blue eyes.
Josh (ジョッシュ, Josshu)
Voiced by: Tatsuya Kobashi
Snow's friend. He has brown hair and purple eyes. He is president of the second-year class. He is described as somewhat shy, but friendly at heart. He was able to enter the conservatory after four years. He plays a clarinet. He is stalked by the spirit Rishuri.
Rishuritenku (リシュリーテインク, Rishurītenku)
Voiced by: Hitomi Oikawa
The youngest child of the eight goddesses, Rishuri has long purple hair and purple eyes. She is extremely shy and jealous, and can be very childish. She likes to stalk Josh and tries to stop other girls from interacting with him. At one point she offered to be Josh's contract partner, but was refused. She seems to be tied to a musician who fell in love with her 200 years ago.
Marvelous Kirada (マーヴェラス = キーラだ)
Voiced by: Junko Noda
The headmaster of Seireijima Academy 200 years ago. He has blue hair and brown eyes.
Paria (パリア)
Voiced by: Yugo Takahashi
Marvelous's younger brother. He has blue hair and brown eyes. He attended Seireijima Academy. He has poor health and is usually seen walking with a cane. He meets Snow from a time slip event.
Nanoboniboku (ナノボ二ー卜) ??
Voiced by: Mai Kadowaki
A mysterious freshman with short pink hair and red eyes.
Etanaria (エターナリア, Etānaria)
One of the eight founders. She is known as the White Goddess. She has long pink hair and red eyes. She was part of a group called the White Team with Blanca, Angelo and Angelica.
Angelo (アンジェロ, Anjero) and Angelica (アンジェリカ, Anjerika)
Voiced by: Risa Habei
Twins with short blond hair and brown eyes. Blanca's past musicians. They both have cheerful and easygoing personalities. Angelica is the older of the two. They both like pickles.
Eryubokukuchin (エリュ卜口ン) ??
Voiced by: Hidefumi Takemoto
Primrose's former spirit partner and Blanca's nemesis. He has pink hair and red eyes.

== Introduced in anime series ==
In the anime series, the main characters from the Crimson series work at Office Tsuge, Divine Song Players Management Group (ツゲ神曲楽士派遣事務所, Tsuge Shinkyoku Gakushi Haken Jimusho). These regular characters were introduced in Shinkyoku Sōkai Polyphonica anime in 2007 and its prequel Shinkyoku Sōkai Polyphonica Crimson S in 2009.

=== Introduced in Polyphonica anime ===
Yardy Woda Mungaool (ヤーディオ・ウォダ・ムナグール, Yādio Voda Munagūru)
Voiced by: Nobuyuki Hiyama
Eufinley's spirit partner. He has silver-colored hair and eyes. On the day they meet, Yardio quickly tried to make a covenant by kissing her, but received a punch to the face instead. He is a laid back character in contrast to the more serious Eufinley. He also likes to fight, and his power level is greater than most four winged spirits. Unlike Coatie, Yardy is more open in showing affection towards his partner.^{Ep. 5}
Dillen Akatsuki (アカツキ・ディーレン, Akatsuki Dīren)
Voiced by: Daisuke Ono
Akatsuki is a mysterious Dantist that first appears in episode 3 of the Polyphonica anime series. His one-man orchestra is a split keyboard.^{Ep. 3} He dislikes spirits and believes they will betray their masters.^{Ep. 5} He is hired by Office Tsuge's rivals to impede their work.^{Ep. 3, 5, 10} The reason for his hatred is because some years ago, when his family's house was burning, he sent Meilreet to rescue his sister, only to find that she had returned with his one-man orchestra instead. He later discovers that his sister had already died by the time Meilreet reached her.^{Ep. 10}
Meilreet Lulu Ulkhauren (メイルリート・ルル・ウルクハウレン, Meirurīto Ruru Urukuhauren)
Voiced by: Mamiko Noto
Meilreet is the spirit who made a contract with Akatsuki. She has brown hair and pointy ears and wears a large headband. The girls at Office Tsuge call her an amazon.^{Ep. 3, 5} Akatsuki hates her, and by extension all other spirits, believing that all spirits will betray their masters. As a result, their souls no longer connect, and she only pretends to be able to feel his Divine Songs.^{Ep. 5}
Bourai (ボウライ, Bōrai) and Jimutīru (ジムティル, Jimutīru)
Small two-winged flying spirits that are attracted to music. A number of them can usually be found with Rembart although they will appear anywhere that Commandia are played or sung. Rembart uses them to complete tasks since he has not contracted with a greater spirit yet.^{Ep. 1, 2}

=== Introduced in Crimson S anime ===
Mizelldrit
Voiced by: Ai Nonaka
A two-winged spirit who takes the form of a young teen girl with pink hair styled in twin tails. She is contracted to the headmaster of the Dantist Academy. He occasionally sends her out on missions as a scout/spy for which she takes on the form of a Borei.
Elaine
Voiced by: Hitomi Nabatame
A four-winged spirit who takes the form of a woman with long green hair and who is contracted to the headmaster of the Dantist Academy.

== Works cited ==
- "LN" is shortened form for light novel and refers to the Polyphonica light novels. Example, "LN Black" refers to the Black volumes.
- "Ep." is shortened form for episode and refers to an episode number of the Shinkyoku Sōkai Polyphonica anime. "CS Ep." refers to episodes in Shinkyoku Sōkai Polyphonica Crimson S.
