= The Everyday Tales of a Cat God =

Japanese manga series

- Cover of the first manga volume

猫神やおよろず (Nekogami Yaoyorozu)
- Manga
- Written by: FLIPFLOPs
- Published by: Akita Shoten
- Magazine: Champion Red Ichigo
- Original run: July 2007 – October 2012
- Volumes: 6
- Anime television series
- Directed by: Hiroaki Sakurai
- Written by: Touko Machida
- Studio: AIC PLUS+
- Licensed by: NA: NIS America
- Original network: AT-X, Chiba TV, Sun TV, Tokyo MX, TV Aichi, TV Saitama
- Original run: July 9, 2011 – September 24, 2011
- Episodes: 12+1 (OVA)

The Everyday Tales of a Cat God (猫神やおよろず, Nekogami Yaoyorozu; lit. A Myriad of Cat Fairies), also known as Cat God, is a Japanese manga series written and illustrated by FLIPFLOPs about a cat goddess that lives in an antique shop. An anime television adaptation by AIC PLUS+ aired in Japan between July and September 2011 and has been licensed in North America by NIS America.

== Plot ==
Nekogami Yaoyorozu is a story about a Cat God named Mayu who has been stripped of her rank and powers and banished from Takama-ga-hara to live on Earth for illegal gambling. She ends up living in an antique shop called Yaoyorozudou with a girl called Yuzu. The story revolves around the various antics the two get up to as they meet with various other gods and creatures from Japanese Mythology.

== Characters ==
Mayu (繭, Mayu)
Voiced by: Haruka Tomatsu
Mayu is a diminutive Cat God (Nekogami) who has the power to find lost items using a magical scroll. Mayu is a really lazy Cat God, who likes to relax at home, play video games and of course sleep and eat (mostly seafood) much like a real cat. She also likes to tease everybody, and does anything for her games. She also has a gambling addiction which got her kicked out Takamagahara and stripped of her divine powers by her mother. Despite that she is very competent as a Cat God when she needs to be and is genuinely caring of others both her friends and of things there besides resulting her in being well loved by the people of her town. Mayu has orange-yellow hair, brown eyes and cat ears. She has two tails which caused Yuzu to confuse her for a Nekomata when they first met.
Yuzu Komiya (古宮柚子, Komiya Yuzu)
Voiced by: Yui Horie
Yuzu is the owner of Yaoyorozudou, a Japanese antique shop she inherited from her father, and she lives together with Mayu. She has lavender colored hair and green eyes and always wears a white apron. Yuzu is very positive and all the gods like her. Yuzu rarely gets angry, but when she does she gets a little scary. Even though Yuzu doesn't like Mayu's annoying attitude, she still cares about her. The two met when the ghost of her dead cat Kotetsu convinced Mayu to help Yuzu with her grief over his death. She possesses no mystical power but has an incredible natural talent for discerning the quality and authenticity of antique Japanese items.
Sasana Shōsōin (正倉院笹鳴, Shousouin Sasana)
Voiced by: Ai Kayano
A black haired Cat God, who has also grey eyes. Sasana is Mayu's fiancé, the reason for this being their fathers, who decided Sasana and Mayu would make a good 'couple' without considering the other child's gender. Sasana is usually content, but when she's close to Mayu she's really happy, calling her 'Mayu-sama' and talking always about how she is ready for marriage. She wields a magical wooden sword called Swordfish which transforms from the pick of a Shamisen. She maintains a fierce rivalry with Meiko for Mayu's love.
Meiko (メイ子, Meiko)
Voiced by: Ayana Taketatsu
Meiko is a blonde "princess" with grayish-blue eyes. She is grand-daughter of the god Daikokuten and wields his magical golden hammer which is not only extremely powerful but can also create gold coins like in legend. Just like Sasana, she likes Mayu a lot, tracing back to when they were kids and Meiko had no friends and Mayu invited her to play with her and Sasana, but she refused. But Mayu told her that she could come anytime she wanted to, which left a strong impression on Meiko. Meiko is quick to temper, but also possesses a soft side.
Yoshino (芳乃, Yoshino)
Voiced by: MAKO
A minor goddess of Cherry Blossoms. She has pink pigtails and is easily the clumsiest of all the main characters. Her portfolio only allows her to control the blossoming of cherry trees and she is generally useless in combat for no-want of effort. She joined Mayu's circle of friends after accidentally mailing a special jar of magical ash used to make cherry trees bloom which Mayu threw away not knowing what it was. Mayu then helped Yoshino find it again and bolstered her self-confidence. Yoshino is scared of ghosts.
Gonta (ゴン太, Gonta)
Voiced by: Yuuko Sanpei
A young Fox God in charge of caring for the town's wealth and prosperity. He has a major crush on Yuzu and is something of pervert spending much of his time fantasizing about her. He is extremely headstrong and as such is willing to move heaven and earth for his infatuation but is incapable of expressing his feelings even when circumstances don't conspire to thwart him. He enjoys antagonizing Mayu mostly out of jealousy over her closeness to Yuzu and his belief that Mayu is impeding him.
Shamo (しゃも, Shamo)
Voiced by: Aki Toyosaki
A God of Poverty and a traveling performance auditor for the gods. She made friends with Yuzu (the latter not knowing Shamo was a Poverty God) through whom she came to conclusion that while chaotic and disorganized the town's gods were sufficiently competent. Following this episode, she frequently returns to hang with the rest of the cast.

== Media ==
=== Manga ===
Nekogami Yaoyorozu began its serial run in the July 2007 issue of Champion Red Ichigo, ending in October 2012. The series was published in six compilation volumes.

=== Anime ===
In December 2010, an anime television series based on the manga was announced in Champion Red Ichigo. Produced by AIC PLUS+ under the direction of Hiroaki Sakurai, the anime series aired on AT-X between July 9, 2011, and September 24, 2011, and was simulcast by Crunchyroll. NIS America has licensed the series under the name The Everyday Tales of a Cat God and released it in North America on subtitled DVD and Blu-ray Disc on June 4, 2013.

==== Episode list ====
No.	Title	Original release date
1	"The God of Poverty's Inspect+" "Binbōgami Insupekuto+" (貧乏神インスペクト+)	July 9, 2011
Shamo, a God of Poverty, is predicted to arrive in the town Mayu and her friends live in prompting them to form a coalition of otherwise rival gods in order to track down and stop the poverty god before disaster strikes.
2	"Sakura Front Overture" "Sakura Furonto Ōbāchua" (桜フロントオーバーチュア)	July 16, 2011
Yoshino a minor goddess of cherry blossoms accidentally mails the jar of magical ash needed for the cherry blossoms to bloom to Mayu who throws it away not knowing what it is prompting a frantic search before the cherry blossom deadline passes.
3	"Desperate Deadline" "Sute Hachi Deddorain" (捨て鉢デッドライン)	July 23, 2011
Yukina Kamo a powerful onmyoji and popular manga artist runs into a bind when her manga assistants who are also her shikigami go on strike and run away prompting Mayu to render assistance in getting them back before Yukina's deadline.
4	"Memory Halation Summer" "Omoide Harēshon Samā" (思い出ハレーションサマー)	July 30, 2011
Urara, a Nightmare Eater, enters Yaoyorozudou to find its old owner, Makitarou, but she finds Yuzu his daughter instead. She enters into Mayu's dreams, but finds them so boring that she enters into Yuzu's dreams, causing her to see a nightmare about her tragic past.
5	"Typhoon God Overrun" "Gufū-shin Ōbāran" (颶風神オーバーラン)	August 6, 2011
After winning tickets and hoping to see Yuzu in a bikini, Gonta ends up inviting everyone to a beach-side resort just as a typhoon rolls in. Undaunted, Gonta attempts to battle the typhoon god controlling it.
6	"Recollection of the Antiquity" "Tsuioku Antikiti" (追憶アンティキティ)	August 13, 2011
While visiting Yuzu's old antiques teacher with Mayu, the three end up reminiscing about the one time a sleazy antique dealer tried to swindle Yuzu allowing her to show off her natural talent for the first time by outwitting him.
7	"September Thriller Night" "Nezameduki Surirānaito" (寝覚月スリラーナイト)	August 20, 2011
While staying over a Gonta's shrine to help with a festival, the girls end up telling lousy ghost stories to each other before bed.
8	"Mukoubuchi Dice Roll" "Mukou Buchi Daisurōru" (むこうぶちダイスロール)	August 27, 2011
After losing her precious video game to Gonta's mother Shizuha in a game of dice, Mayu sneaks into Gonta's shrine with Yuzu's help and tries to steal it back and ends up challenging Shizuha again after discovering that she regularly cheats.
9	"Rainy Rainy" "Reinī Reinī" (レイニーレイニー)	September 3, 2011
Mayu recounts the story of how she got exiled from Takamagahara to Yoshino over dinner and ends up telling her how she met Yuzu by helping the ghost of Yuzu's cat Kotetsu.
10	"Stray Cat On The Earth" "Mayoineko Onjiāsu" (迷い猫オンジアース)	September 10, 2011
Due to a misunderstanding, Amane the apprentice Guardian Cat of the Moon's magical memory storehouses, travels to Earth to confront her successor Mayu.
11	"Dirty Cat Run After" "Doraneko Ran-afutā" (どら猫ランアフター)	September 17, 2011
After spending a day with Mayu, Amane learns a few valuable lessons about compassion and temperance from the wayward Cat God.
12	"Kien Karma Contention" "Kien Shukuen Kontenshon" (奇縁宿縁コンテンション)	September 24, 2011
Mayu is captured by her mother in order to attend an arranged marriage between Mayu and the second-most important god Tsukiyomi the Moon God. Everyone mounts a rescue.

An OVA subtitled "Ohanami Ghostbusters" 27 minutes 19 seconds long was also released March 21, 2012.

== See also ==
- Darwin's Game, another manga series by FLIPFLOPs
- The Lord Magear's Apprentice, another manga series by FLIPFLOPs
