= Visitor (disambiguation) =

Visitor, in English and Welsh law, is an academic or ecclesiastical title.

Visitor, The Visitor or Visitors may also refer to:

== Geography ==
- Visitor (mountain), a mountain in eastern Montenegro
- Lake Visitor, a mountain lake in eastern Montenegro

== Literature ==
- Visitor (novel), a 2016 novel by C. J. Cherryh
- Visitors (Buffy novel), a 1999 novel by Laura Anne Gilman and Josepha Sherman
- Visitors (Card novel), a 2014 novel by Orson Scott Card
- Visitors (play), a 2014 play by Barney Norris
- The Visitor (Applegate novel), a 1996 novel by K. A. Applegate, the second installment in the Animorphs series
- The Visitor (Child novel), a 2000 novel by Lee Child
- "The Visitor" (short story), a 1965 short story by Roald Dahl
- The Visitor (play), a 1993 play by Eric-Emmanuel Schmitt
- The Visitors (novel), a 1980 novel by Clifford D. Simak
- The Visitors (play), a 1961 play by Joe Orton
- Visitors, a 1997 novel by Anita Brookner
- Visitors, a 1997 trilogy of novels by Rodman Philbrick and Lynn Harnett, consisting of Strange Invaders, Things and Brain Stealers
- Visitors, a 2001 children's novel by R. L. Stine
- The Visitor, a 1967 novel by Anthony Gilbert
- The Visitor, a 1981 novel by Chauncey G. Parker III, basis for the film Of Unknown Origin
- The Visitor, a 1983 novel by Laurence Meynell
- The Visitor, a Valiant Comics title which debuted in 1995
- The Visitor, a 1995 novel by Christopher Pike
- The Visitor, a 2000 novella by Maeve Brennan
- The Visitor, a 2002 novel by Sheri S. Tepper
- The Visitor, a 2003 novel by Lori Wick
- The Visitor, a 2005 novel by Jane R. Goodall
- The Visitor, a 2006 novel by Ann Halam
- The Visitor, a 2012 novel by Patricia, Fredrick and John Patrick McKissack
- The Visitors, a 1965 novel by Nathaniel Benchley
- The Visitors, a 2014 novel by Sally Beauman
- The Visitors, a 2014 novel by Patrick O'Keeffe
- The Visitors, a 2020 play and 2023 novel by Jane Harrison

== Film ==
- Visitor (2021 film), a Spanish-Catalan film
- Visitors (2003 film), an Australian horror film
- Visitors (2013 film), an American documentary film
- The Visitor (1974 film), an Italian comedy film
- The Visitor (1979 film), a thriller by Giulio Paradisi
- The Visitor (2002 film), an Australian film by Dan Castle
- The Visitor (2007 feature film), a U.S. feature film by Thomas McCarthy
- The Visitor (2007 short film), a short film by Dave Smith
- The Visitor (2008 film), a Finnish film
- The Visitor (2015 film), a Turkish film
- The Visitor (2022 film), an American film
- The Visitor (2024 film), a British film
- The Visitors (1972 film), a drama by Elia Kazan
- The Visitors (1988 film), a 1988 Swedish horror film
- The Visitor, the working title of the 2001 film Planet of the Apes
- The Visitors, a 1993 French comedy film also known as Les Visiteurs
- The Visitors, the working title of the 2014 film Extraterrestrial

== Television ==
=== Episodes ===
- "Visitor", Garo: Makai no Hana episode 24 (2014)
- "Visitor", Gate episode 11 (2015)
- "Visitor", Marry Me, Marry You season 1, episode 21 (2021)
- "Visitor", Smallville season 2, episode 18 (2003)
- "Visitor", Sorry for Your Loss season 1, episode 4 (2018)
- "Visitor", Teddy Edward episode 5 (1973)
- "Visitors", Fafner in the Azure: Exodus episode 1 (2015)
- "A Visitor", Inazuma Eleven GO: Galaxy episode 18 (2013)
- "The Visitor", Adventure Time season 6, episode 27 (2015)
- "The Visitor", Alcoa Presents One Step Beyond season 2, episode 33 (1960)
- "The Visitor", Ben 10 season 3, episode 13 (2007)
- "The Visitor", Blue Skies episode 3 (1988)
- "The Visitor", Clangers (original) series 1, episode 2 (1969)
- "The Visitor", Clangers (revival) series 3, episode 1 (2019)
- "The Visitor", Death Valley Days season 18, episode 9 (1969)
- "The Visitor", Delicious series 1, episode 4 (2017)
- "The Visitor", Dr. Quinn, Medicine Woman season 1, episode 4 (1993)
- "The Visitor", Finders Keepers season 1, episode 4 (1991)
- "The Visitor", Good Times season 1, episode 9 (1974)
- "The Visitor", Killinaskully series 4, episode 4 (2007)
- "The Visitor (1)" and "The Visitor (2)", JoJo's Bizarre Adventure: Stone Ocean episodes 3–4 (2021)
- "The Visitor", Lassie season 2, episode 23 (1956)
- "The Visitor", Lassie season 19, episode 14 (1973)
- "The Visitor", Lawman season 1, episode 24 (1959)
- "The Visitor", Life Goes On season 2, episode 3 (1990)
- "The Visitor", MacGyver season 6, episode 10 (1990)
- "The Visitor", Manhunt season 1, episode 6 (1959)
- "The Visitor", Mr. Bean: The Animated Series series 3, episodes 2 (2004)
- "The Visitor", Nanny and the Professor season 2, episode 10 (1970)
- "The Visitor", Promised Land season 3, episode 11 (1999)
- "The Visitor", Redwall season 1, episode 9 (1999)
- "The Visitor", Scout's Safari season 1, episode 9 2003)
- "The Visitor", Shaun the Sheep series 1, episode 24 (2007)
- "The Visitor", Sitting Ducks season 1, episode 10b (2022)
- "The Visitor", Star Trek: Deep Space Nine season 4, episode 2 (1995)
- "The Visitor", Tales from the Neverending Story episode 12 (2002)
- "The Visitor", Tekkaman Blade episode 18 (1992)
- "The Visitor", The Army Show episode 12 (1998)
- "The Visitor", The DuPont Show with June Allyson season 2, episode 9 (1960)
- "The Visitor", The Little Flying Bears episode 36 (1991)
- "The Visitor", The Lost World season 2, episode 20 (2001)
- "The Visitor", The New Adventures of Blinky Bill season 3, episode 7 (1986)
- "The Visitor", The Rifleman season 2, episode 18 (1960)
- "The Visitor", The Secrets episode 3 (2014)
- "The Visitor", The Waltons season 3, episode 14 (1974)
- "The Visitor", Transformers: Cyberverse season 2, episode 3 (2019)
- "The Visitor", Vegas season 1, episode 22 (1979)
- "The Visitor", Webster season 6, episode 29 (1989)

=== Shows ===
- The Visitor (TV series), a 1997-98 American series
- Návštěvníci (TV series) or The Visitors, a 1983-84 Czechoslovak series

=== Subjects ===
- "The Visitors", a comedy sketch featured in "The Ant, An Introduction", Monty Python's Flying Circus series 1, episode 9 (1969)
- The Visitor, the working title of the Doctor Who serial Castrovalva
- Visitors, a fictional alien race from the science fiction television franchise V

== Music ==
- The Visitors (opera), an opera by Carlos Chávez

=== Bands ===
- The Visitors (Australian band), a rock band formed in 1978 in Sydney
- Visitors, a French rock music project produced in the 1970s by Jean-Pierre Massiera

=== Albums ===
- Visitor (album), an album by Sienna Spiro
- Visitor, an album by Onelinedrawing
- The Visitor (Arena album) (1998)
- The Visitor (Mick Fleetwood album) (1981)
- The Visitor (Jim O'Rourke album)
- The Visitor (UFO album) (2009)
- The Visitor (Neil Young album) (2017)
- The Visitors (ABBA album) (1981)
- The Visitors (The Visitors album) (1983)
- Visitors, a 1977 album by Automatic Man

=== Songs ===
- "Visitor" (song), by Of Monsters and Men
- "The Visitor" (song), by Sienna Spiro
- "The Visitors" (song), by ABBA
- "The Visitor", a song by the Black Heart Procession from Amore del Tropico
- "The Visitor", a song by IU from her 2019 EP Love Poem

== Other uses ==
- Visitor Television, a former television channel in Christchurch, New Zealand
- The Visitor (newspaper), a Morecambe newspaper
- The Visitors (installation), a 2012 installation and video art piece by Ragnar Kjartansson
- Visitor (fish), a species of velvetfish Adventor elongatus from Australia and New Guinea
- Nana Visitor (born 1957), American actress
- The Visitor, a Fortnite: Battle Royale character that was the primary start of the Season 4 "Launch Off!" event and the Season X "The End" event.

== See also ==
- Apostolic visitor, in the Roman Catholic Church, a representative of the Pope assigned to perform a canonical visitation
- Board of visitors, one of several alternative terms for a board of directors
- Canonical visitation
- Health visitor, a nurse working in community health in the UK
- Prison visitor, a person who visits prisons to befriend prisoners and monitor their welfare
- Provincial episcopal visitor, a Church of England bishop assigned to minister to clergy, laity and parishes who do not accept the ministry of women priests
- Quinquennial Visit Ad Limina
- Unique visitor, a statistic describing a unit of traffic to a website
- Visiting scholar
- Visitor health insurance
- Visitor management
- Visitor pattern, a software design pattern
- Visitor visa
