= List of Gate episodes =

The anime television series Gate was produced by A-1 Pictures and directed by Takahiko Kyōgoku. The series' character designs are based on the light novel illustrations. The first 12 episodes aired in Japan between July 4 and September 18, 2015. The second half aired on Tokyo MX from January 9 to March 26, 2016. It was streamed online by Crunchyroll and is licensed by Sentai Filmworks in North America. From episode 1 to 12, the opening theme song is "Gate (Sore wa Akatsuki no You ni)" (GATE～それは暁のように～) by Kishida Kyoudan & The Akeboshi Rockets and the ending theme song is "Prism Communicate" (ぷりずむコミュニケート, Purizumu Komyunikēto) by Hisako Kanemoto, Nao Tōyama, and Risa Taneda. Sentai Filmworks released a complete collection of the series on Blu-ray and DVD on July 11, 2017. For the second half, the opening theme is "Gate II (Sekai o Koete)" (GATE II ～世界を超えて～) by Kishida Kyoudan & The Akeboshi Rockets, and the ending theme is "Itsudatte Communication" (いつだってコミュニケーション) by Kanemoto, Tōyama, and Taneda.

== Episode list ==
No.	Title	Directed by	Written by	Original release date
1	"The Self-Defence Force Goes to Another World"; Transliteration: "Jieitai, Isekai e Iku" (Japanese: 自衛隊、異世界へ行く)	Takahiko Kyōgoku	Tatsuhiko Urahata	July 4, 2015
A mysterious gate suddenly appears in Ginza, Tokyo, through which mythological creatures led by men in Roman armor emerge and attack the people. Yōji Itami, a JSDF reservist who is attending a nearby doujin convention, helps organizing the police to evacuate the civilians to the Imperial Palace before the JSDF arrives to stop the invaders. For his actions, Itami is promoted to First Lieutenant and celebrated as a national hero. The appearance of the Gate and attack on Japanese civilians, dubbed the Ginza Incident, prompts the incumbent Prime Minister to take action by proclaiming that Japan will send a JSDF task force backed by the US to the "Special Region", the world beyond the Gate, to not only explore the new world but also capture and demand reparations from those responsible for the attack. After three months of preparation, the new Prime Minister sends off the JSDF task force, including Itami, on their mission to the Special Region. Upon arriving, the task force encounters an army waiting for them, and prepares for battle.
2	"Two Military Forces"; Transliteration: "Futatsu no Gunzei" (Japanese: 二つの軍勢)	Ryō Andō	Tatsuhiko Urahata	July 11, 2015
The army sent by the Empire to deal with the Japanese forces stationed at Alnus Hill, where the Gate is located, is easily obliterated by the JSDF's modern artillery. Emperor Molt calls for the armies of the Empire's vassal states to attack, only for them to be defeated with massive casualties as well; a move planned by the Emperor to prevent the vassal states from taking advantage of the Empire's depleted military. While Emperor Molt decides to delay a possible advance from the JSDF, Itami is assigned to lead the 3rd Recon Unit, created to survey the nearby cities and points of interest. After passing by the village of Coda, the 3rd Unit observes a massive Fire Dragon burning and destroying a settlement within the nearby forest. While looking for survivors, Itami finds an unconscious Elf woman inside a well.
3	"Fire Dragon"; Transliteration: "Enryū" (Japanese: 炎龍)	Shigeki Kawai	Tatsuhiko Urahata	July 18, 2015
Taking the Elf with them, the 3rd Unit return to the village of Coda, and upon learning of the Fire Dragon, the villagers decide to evacuate, assisted by the Japanese soldiers. The group, now including all the villagers, are later joined by two mages, Lelei la Lalena and her master Kato El Altestan. Hoping to take advantage of the situation, a group of bandits decide to attack the villagers, only to be slaughtered by Rory Mercury, an apostle of the Dark God Emroy. While escorting the refugees, Itami's party encounter Rory, who decides to accompany them as well. However, the Fire Dragon appears and attacks the convoy, killing numerous villagers until the 3rd Unit blows off one of its front legs with an anti-tank rocket, forcing it to retreat. After the 3rd Unit parts ways with the villagers, Itami decides to take the remaining refugees, as well as Rory, the Elf woman, and Lelei, back to Alnus Hill.
4	"To Unknown Lands"; Transliteration: "Mishiranu Chi e" (Japanese: 見知らぬ地へ)	Nao Umakawa	Tatsuhiko Urahata	July 25, 2015
The 3rd Recon Unit returns to Alnus Hill, now converted into an advanced JSDF base, and Itami obtains authorization to provide shelter to the refugees. Meanwhile, Princess Piña Co Lada from the Empire learns more about the JSDF's exploits and decides to investigate them personally. Back at Alnus, the refugees get used to their new lives among the Japanese soldiers, but for some reason Tuka Luna Marceau, the Elf girl, keeps requesting supplies not only for herself, but for another, unknown male not listed among the guests. Knowing that they cannot depend on the JSDF's charity forever, Lelei points out that they can collect scales from the corpses of dragons killed by JSDF, which will fetch a good price in the local markets. Meanwhile, on the other side of the gate, the Japanese Diet requests Itami for an audience regarding the battle against the Fire Dragon. However, by the time the summons for Itami arrives, he has already left with Rory, Lelei, Tuka and the rest of the 3rd Unit to trade the collected dragon scales at the city of Italica, where Piña and her Knights are also headed in search of further information about the JSDF.
5	"The Battle of Italica"; Transliteration: "Itarika Kōbōsen" (Japanese: イタリカ攻防戦)	Naoya Andō	Kurasumi Sunayama	August 1, 2015
Itami's party arrives at Italica, just as the city's forces, led by Princess Piña, repel an assault by an invading bandit force made up of deserters from the armies defeated at Alnus. Knowing that her knights and the local militia lack the strength to keep holding off the bandits until help arrives, Piña finds herself in a predicament until she meets the 3rd Recon Unit. Upon being informed of the situation, Itami decides to help defend the city and agrees with Piña's plan of positioning himself and his soldiers on the least guarded side of the walls (the South Gate) to act as a decoy. However, the enemy does not fall for their trap and launches an attack on the main force at the East Gate instead. As the city's defenses are broken, the Princess finds herself on the verge of despair.
6	"Ride of the Valkyries"; Transliteration: "Ikusa Megami no Kikō" (Japanese: 戦女神の騎行)	Ryō Andō	Takaaki Suzuki	August 8, 2015
Rory, Itami and two of his subordinates, Akira Tomita and Shino Kuribayashi, head to Piña's location to help her men. Meanwhile, the JSDF sends a helicopter unit to assist the 3rd Recon Unit in defending Italica, which arrives just in time, blasting Wagner's Ride of the Valkyries from loudspeakers and annihilating the invaders with ease. After Lelei sells the dragon scales and Itami has negotiated with Piña and the Italicans for rather trivial compensation terms in exchange for their retaining their sovereignty, the 3rd Recon Unit departs back to Alnus Hill, only to encounter Piña's Order of the Rose Knights on their way. Upon discovering their identities as JSDF members, the knights take Itami captive, unaware of the peace treaty he and Piña just established. In order to avoid further conflict, Itami orders his unit to leave without him instead of fighting, leaving himself at the knights' mercy.
7	"The Princess's Decision"; Transliteration: "Kōjo no Ketsudan" (Japanese: 皇女の決断)	Ayako Kawano	Kurasumi Sunayama	August 15, 2015
Back in Italica, Piña reprimands her knights Bozes and Panache for capturing Itami, fearing that the JSDF will use the incident as an excuse to retaliate for breaking the treaty. As the Formal family staff treat Itami's wounds, Rory, Lelei, Tuka and some of the 3rd Unit sneak back to Italica to rescue Itami, but find themselves welcomed by the Formal maids and join Itami for a small socializing party. Meanwhile, Piña orders Bozes to sleep with Itami in the hopes of earning his forgiveness, but Bozes becomes angry and assaults Itami after seeing him enjoying himself and seemingly ignoring her. Appalled that Bozes might have antagonized Itami further, Piña and Bozes join the 3rd Recon Unit's trip back to Alnus Hill to personally apologize to Itami's superiors for Bozes' actions. While Piña and Bozes meet with Itami's commanding officer Lieutenant General Hazama with Lelei as an interpreter, Itami invites Tuka to come with him to Japan to meet the Japanese Diet as a representative of the Special Region. The next day, Itami, Shino and Akira accompany Rory, Lelei, Tuka, Piña and Bozes through the Gate to Japan.
8	"Japan, Beyond the Gate"; Transliteration: "Mon no Mukō no Nihon" (Japanese: 門の向こうのニホン)	Toshimasa Ishii	Kurasumi Sunayama	August 22, 2015
Itami and his group arrive in Tokyo, where Piña and the other girls are awed by the city and its people. After meeting a Public Security agent by the name of Komakado, Itami, Rory, Lelei, and Tuka head to the Japanese Diet while Piña and Bozes meet with members of the Ministry of Foreign Affairs to discuss the details for the upcoming peace talks. At the Japanese Diet, Itami, Rory, Lelei, and Tuka are questioned by the chairwoman of the Investigation Committee on the Fire Dragon attack, who accuses the JSDF of failing to protect the refugees killed by the Fire Dragon. Rory, Lelei, and Tuka defend the JSDF, telling of how the Japanese soldiers helped save many lives from the monster. Afterwards, both Itami's and Piña's groups reunite in the subway to escape from the press as well as a mysterious group which seems to be targeting the Special Region girls. Due to a mole leaking their itinerary, Itami makes a change of plans and brings the group to stay with his ex-wife.
9	"The Hakone Mountain Night Battle"; Transliteration: "Hakonesanchū Yasen" (Japanese: 箱根山中夜戦)	Shigeki Kawai	Takahiko Kyōgoku	August 29, 2015
Itami explains everything to his ex-wife Risa, who agrees to help him by taking Rory, Lelei and Tuka on a shopping trip the next day, while Akira accompanies Piña and Bozes to the library after both of them take an interest in boys-love manga from Risa. Meanwhile, Itami meets with his old friend, Defense Minister Kanou Tarou, who instructs him to bring the Special Region guests to a hot spring inn guarded by the Japanese SFG. As Itami's group stays at the inn for some relaxation, three different Black Ops teams enter the area and battle with the SFG. While the SFG identifies two of the Black Ops operatives as Americans, the Japanese Prime Minister is blackmailed by the US President, who wants the SFG to stop attacking his Black Ops team so they can take the Special Region guests with them. The Prime Minister orders Tarou to tell his men to stand down, but not before revealing that he will be resigning to void the President's leverage. As the three Ops teams head to the Inn, Itami encounters a drunken and aroused Rory.
10	"Despair and Hope"; Transliteration: "Zetsubō to Kibō" (Japanese: 絶望と希望)	Takahiko Takao	Tatsuhiko Urahata	September 5, 2015
Rory's attempts to seduce Itami are interrupted by a phone call from Tarou. The US Black Ops team arrives at the Inn, only to encounter the two rival teams from Russia and China, leading to a three-way firefight which Rory soon joins, ending with everyone besides Rory dead. After taking a van from the Russians, Itami's group heads back to Ginza, but, worried that the foreign agents will attack again, Risa posts a message on the internet that the Special Region girls will be visiting the Ginza memorial. As a result, a large crowd gathers at Ginza to meet the girls, hindering the foreign agents' plans to kidnap them. Public Security is able to inconspicuously arrest all foreign agents on the scene, and after Shino publicizes the previous kidnapping attempts on live TV through her news reporter sister Nanami, the US, Chinese, and Russian leaders cancel the kidnapping operation. After saying goodbye to Risa and paying their respects at the Ginza memorial, the Special Region girls return to the Gate. Realizing the Empire's war with Japan will lead to its destruction, Piña makes plans to head back to the Capital to arrange peace talks between both sides.
11	"Visitor"; Transliteration: "Raihō-sha" (Japanese: 来訪者)	Tatsuma Namikawa	Kurasumi Sunayama	September 12, 2015
Five months since the Gate's opening, the Alnus refugee camp has developed into a town and trading center for goods from Earth. At the Imperial capital, Piña introduces Kouji Sugawara, the Japanese Ministry of Foreign Affairs' new ambassador to the Empire, to Lord Cicero, one of the most important nobles within the Empire's pro-war faction, and obtains his cooperation with the peace talks in exchange for the release of his nephew, who is currently in Japan's custody as a POW. Back in Alnus, Tuka keeps wandering the city looking for her father and refusing to accept the fact that he is already dead. As Itami and his friends discuss their concern for Tuka in a tavern, Kurokawa claims that they must make her face the truth, but Itami objects, certain that they can not be responsible for Tuka forever. Left alone with Rory, Itami keeps drinking with her until a Dark Elf woman by the name of Yao Haa Dushi appears and, mistaking Rory for a child, reprimands Itami for giving her alcohol. With her plans to spend the night with Itami ruined, an annoyed Rory mischievously plays along with the Dark Elf's misunderstanding, forcing Itami to flee. The Elf is unaware that Itami was one of the "Men in Green" she was looking for, whom she wants to ask for aid for her people, who are attacked by the Fire Dragon. The next day, as she prepares to visit the JSDF's base at Alnus, Itami heads towards the Imperial capital.
12	"What Would Itami Do"; Transliteration: "Itami nara" (Japanese: 伊丹なら)	Naoya Andō	Tatsuhiko Urahata	September 19, 2015
Yao's initial attempts to ask the JSDF for help fail, as most of the soldiers know little of the local language, and she is arrested by the Military Police after attacking several thugs who mistake her for a prostitute. Lelei, having improved her magic thanks to Earth's advanced scientific knowledge, is called by the JSDF to serve as Yao's interpreter. After learning her story, General Hazama tells Yao that he cannot help her, as her home, Schwartz Forest, is located in the Elbe Kingdom, which is outside the borders of the Empire. As the Japanese are currently in peace talks with the Empire, sending troops over their border would mean a declaration of war and reignite conflict. With Yao devastated at the news, some soldiers sympathize with her, and Lieutenant Akira Yanagida suggests that Yao should ask Itami for help. Elsewhere, Itami and his men deliver goods from Earth to Piña and Hamilton, as part of their plan to win over more nobles to seek peace with Japan. Before leaving, Itami gives Piña a Yaoi doujin translated by Bozes and Panache, which, unknown to him, contains newspaper clippings of his previous heroic actions. As Itami heads back to base hoping to achieve peace between both sides, Lelei narrates that the war is far from over.
13	"The Banquet Begins"; Transliteration: "Kaien" (Japanese: 開宴)	Ryō Andō	Tatsuhiko Urahata	January 9, 2016
In the Imperial Capital, a private party hosted by Piña is attended by a group of Senators and their families led by Lord Cicero, who, after seeing the 3rd Recon's weapons demonstrations, realizes the futility of fighting the Japanese and seeks to negotiate for peace. However, Crown Prince Zorzal, Piña's elder brother, learns of the meeting and rides with his entourage to confront the senators for treason. Itami's scouts spot the prince approaching, and the 3rd Recon helps the senators escape undetected before he arrives. At Akusho, the capital's red light district, Mari joins the JSDF team stationed there, using her training as a nurse to aid the locals who show up at the outpost. Meanwhile, Yao tries to learn about the people that are important to Itami from a local, while Itami, Shino and Akira stay at Pina's palace. Back at the Akusho outpost, the demi-human prostitutes warn Mari that they feel an "Earth-Shake" is coming. Recognizing it as a sign similar to how animals on Earth can detect earthquakes before they occur, Nyuutabaru, the commanding officer at the outpost, warns the soldiers in the Special Region to evacuate the civilians before the earthquake begins.
14	"The Imperial Capital Quake"; Transliteration: "Teito Gekishin" (Japanese: 帝都激震)	Yūki Itō	Kurasumi Sunayama	January 16, 2016
Piña invites Sugawara, Itami, Shino and Akira to meet with her father the Emperor in the Imperial Palace to advise them how to handle earthquakes. However, Zorzal also arrives to warn his father of another earthquake foretold by his slave Noriko, who is to Piña and the Japanese delegates' shock revealed as a Japanese citizen. Angered with Zorzal's cruel treatment of Noriko, Itami punches him and rescues the girl. Zorzal's bodyguards try to attack, only to be gunned down by Shino, and Itami and Shino torture Zorzal for information about other Japanese captives, only to be stopped by Tyuule, Zorzal's other slave. Sugawara warns the Emperor there will be repercussions if the kidnapped Japanese citizens are not returned to the Japanese before leaving, and the Japanese launch an air strike at the Imperial Senate building as a further message to make peace. While Tyuule treats Zorzal wounds, Zorzal's younger brother, Diabo, learns their father wants to make Zorzal his heir, as he believes that he can easily control Zorzal from the shadows once he abdicates. Meanwhile, Noriko arrives at the JSDF Alnus base, hoping to return to Japan, unaware that her parents were killed during the Ginza incident. Elsewhere, Tuka continues to fruitlessly search for her father.
15	"Tuka Luna Marceau"; Transliteration: "Tyuka Runa Marusō" (Japanese: テュカ・ルナ・マルソー)	Ayako Kawano	Kurasumi Sunayama	January 23, 2016
At the Imperial capital, Diabo and Piña learn that Zorzal has been officially made heir to the throne and, aware of his father's plans, won't become his father's puppet. Unknown to them, Zorzal is being manipulated by Tyuule, who seeks revenge against the Empire and plans its destruction by the JSDF by having Noriko killed and Piña framed for it. At Alnus, Yanagida asks Itami to head to the Elbe Kingdom to kill the Fire Dragon, but Itami refuses as he won't endanger his soldier's lives. However, Tuka has gone insane and now believes Itami is her father after Yao forced her to face the fact that her father was killed by the Fire Dragon. Confronted, Yao reveals that she is desperate for Itami's help to save her people, even if it means hurting those close to him. Itami pretends to be Tuka's father for the time being, but Tuka still continues to slip further into madness. After having a talk with the disguised King Duran of Elbe, who is recuperating at Alnus, Itami finally decides to help Tuka confront and take revenge against the Fire Dragon, which will end her delusions. Rather than going to the Imperial capital with his men, Itami departs with Tuka, Rory, Lelei and Yao in a Humvee with supplies provided by Yanagida.
16	"The Fire Dragon, Once More"; Transliteration: "Enryū Futatabi" (Japanese: 炎龍再び)	Shigeki Kawai	Takaaki Suzuki	January 30, 2016
Delilah, the Warrior Bunny who works at the bar at Alnus refugee town, receives orders from her masters, the Formal Clan, that she is to assassinate Noriko, which, unknown to her, were actually forged by Tyuule, the former Queen of her tribe. When General Hazama learns of Itami's quest to Elbe, he forms a task force to help him fight the Fire Dragon, and Yanagida and King Duran make a deal to allow the JSDF to cross the Elbe Kingdom. Delilah attempts to kill Noriko when Yanagida discovers them, which ends with both of them injured fighting each other. The JSDF investigates the assassination attempt and, with help from the Formal Clan, learns the Formal Clan butler forged the letter under orders from Zorzal's faction, and to gain more information, one of Itami's soldiers, Furuta Hitoshi, goes undercover as a chef in the Capital, where he gains Zorzal's favor. Meanwhile, Itami's party finally reaches Yao's village. While Yao goes to greet her people, Itami and the others are surrounded by a group of Dark Elf guards, only for the Fire Dragon to appear.
17	"Decisive Battle"; Transliteration: "Kessen" (Japanese: 決戦)	Tomo Ōkubo	Tatsuhiko Urahata	February 6, 2016
After driving the Fire Dragon off and meeting the elders of the Dark Elves, Itami and his group heads to the Fire Dragon's nest in the mountains with a group of Dark Elf volunteers. With Rory guarding the entrance of the nest, Itami and his group install a fragmentation bomb beneath the Fire Dragon's nest using C4 and magic weapons lying around to kill the Fire Dragon by surprise. However, the Fire Dragon arrives and kills most of the Dark Elves. As the battle rages, Tuka finally accepts that her father is dead, and uses lighting magic, which ignites the C4, killing the Fire Dragon. As the survivors escape from the mountain, they find Rory heavily injured after fighting Giselle, a rival apostle. Giselle reveals she was the one that woke the Fire Dragon, which led to its rampage, as she was using the Fire Dragon's two hatchlings as help to capture Rory for her patron, the underworld goddess Hardy. Giselle's dragons chase after Itami and his group, only for the JSDF task force to arrive and kill the dragons, forcing Giselle to retreat.
18	"The Magic City of Rondel"; Transliteration: "Mahō Toshi Ronderu" (Japanese: 魔法都市ロンデル)	Takahiko Kyōgoku	Tatsuhiko Urahata	February 13, 2016
Itami is punished for going AWOL fighting the Fire Dragon, but is right afterwards rewarded by various people for his heroic actions and given a new mission to scout for resources with Lelei, Rory, Tuka and Yao. The group heads to the Magic City of Rondel, where Lelei plans to hold a presentation to her fellow mages which, if successful, will gain her the rank of Master, and where they encounter Lelei's older sister Arpeggio and her mentor Mimoza La Mer. Meanwhile in the Imperial Capital, peace talks between Japan and the Empire officially begin, much to Zorzal's anger since the assassination attempt on Noriko and framing it on Pina have failed to derail it. As everyone celebrates the Fire Dragon's death, the Emperor is pleased to learn that Lelei, an Imperial citizen, was also involved in helping defeat the dragon. However, the Emperor suddenly falls ill after drinking wine, secretly poisoned under Tyuule's orders.
19	"Dangerous Sisters"; Transliteration: "Kiken na Shimai" (Japanese: 危険な姉妹)	Ryō Andō	Kurasumi Sunayama	February 20, 2016
With the Emperor bedridden, Zorzal takes over the throne and declares his intent to avenge the Empire's humiliation by the Japanese. With the Imperial capital in curfew, the JSDF forces in Akusho are trapped and the Japanese Ambassadors put under house arrest. To Piña's anger, Zorzal has the pro-peace faction arrested and has his loyal followers planning to attack the Japanese with unconventional and unethical tactics, and her other brother Diabo has run away to seek help from other, superior forces to overthrow Zorzal. Meanwhile in Rondel, Mimoza reveals something interesting to Itami and the others about the Gate: Every few centuries or millenniums, the Gods of the Special Region would open a portal (the Gate) to another world at Alnus, through which the races of those worlds would come and settle in, explaining why they are many different types of races living here. When Arpeggio angrily learns that Lelei has outachieved her in any conceivable field (including finding a romantic interest with Itami), the sisters have a magic duel to settle their dispute. An assassin tries to kill Lelei at the end of the match but is eliminated by Grey. Grey and another Rose Knight, Shandy, reveal to Itami and his group that the assassin was sent by Zorzal due to his jealousy of Lelei's fame of defeating the Flame Dragon, and the two of them came to protect them under Piña's orders. Rather than stay and fight, however, Itami decides that it's best they run away from the assassins.
20	"Lover"; Transliteration: "Koibito" (Japanese: こいびと)	Matsuo Asami	Kurasumi Sunayama	February 27, 2016
As Itami and his group continue to evade Zorzal's killers, Zorzal's secret police continue to arrest the pro-peace faction for treason throughout the capital. Despite this, the Japanese are ordered by their government to not get involved, including refusing sanctuary for the pro-peace faction. Marquess Casel seeks refuge with the Thierry Family, only for the Oprichnina to attack their home, forcing their daughter Sherry to help Casel escape while her parents sacrifice themselves to stop them. Sherry and Casel head to the Jade Palace, which has become the Japanese embassy, to seek asylum, as the palace is under the Rose Knights' protection and a treaty prevents the Empire from setting foot there. Despite Sherry hoping Sugawara, whom she sees as her future husband, to help them, Sugawara sticks to his country's orders to not get involved. However, when the Oprichnina arrive and arrest Casel and Sherry, Sugawara changes his mind and takes Sherry under his custody, thus starting a brutal battle between the Rose Knights and the Oprichnina. Despite what happened, Vice-Minister Shirayuri allows it and contacts her government.
21	"Deadline"; Transliteration: "Deddorain" (Japanese: デッドライン)	Ayako Kawano	Tatsuhiko Urahata	March 5, 2016
The Rose Knights manage to repel the Oprichnina and free Senator Casel, but this leads to an escalation of tension between Japan and the Empire. Minister Kanou and other members of the government suggest to evacuate the Japanese delegation from the Jade Palace, but Prime Minister Morita refuses to give the green light, since representatives from other nations and the media are currently visiting the Special Region and the Alnus camp, so a demonstration of force or having no control of the situation could have bad diplomatic consequences for Japan. However, things turn bad rapidly when Zorzal has Piña under arrest for her refusal to order the Rose Knights to let his soldiers enter the palace and orders his army to put the embassy under siege, which finally drives Morita into authorizing the JSDF's deployment to evacuate the ambassadors and political refugees. Meanwhile in Rondel, Itami and the others manage to neutralize another assassination attempt against them, and prepare a plan to capture the Piper, the leader of the assassins sent to kill them.
22	"The Imperial Princess in Slave's Clothing"; Transliteration: "Dorei-fuku o kita kōjo" (Japanese: 奴隷服を着た皇女)	Shigeki Kawai	Kurasumi Sunayama	March 12, 2016
The Imperial Army attempts to break through the embassy are repelled by the Rose Knights, but with the massive difference in numbers it's just a matter of time until the Jade Palace's falls. Meanwhile, in Rondel, Shandy discovers that the Piper is planning another assassination attempt against Lelei, so Itami and the others prepare themselves to stop him. As expected, during Lelei's presentation, two more assassins try to kill her, but they're both thwarted by Itami and the spectators. However, at the final moment Shandy tries to stab Lelei, but is saved thanks to the armor under her dress. Interrogated about her betrayal, Shandy reveals that the Piper forced her to kill Lelei in order to save Piña, who has been formally accused of high treason. As a result, Itami and the others decide to turn back to the Imperial capital, while the JSDF prepare themselves to launch a massive operation against the capital to break the Jade Palace's siege.
23	"Paradrop"; Transliteration: "Kūtei kōka" (Japanese: 空挺降下)	Takahiko Kyōgoku	Takaaki Suzuki	March 19, 2016
The JSDF begins their assault at the Imperial Capital, rescuing the Pro-Peace faction from prison and the Rose Knights and ambassadors from the Jade Palace. As the JSDF evacuate the refugees, Bozes and Beefeater attempt to rescue Pina from the Imperial Palace, but are forced to retreat with the evacuating JSDF due to the Imperial Army's numbers. As Itami and his group attempt to reach the capital quickly, Tyuule goads Zorzal to continue fighting as he can still employ Piña as a hostage.
24	"Thus, They Fought There"; Transliteration: "Kaku tatakaeri" (Japanese: 斯く戦えり)	Ryō Andō	Tatsuhiko Urahata	March 26, 2016
Itami and the others reach the Imperial capital, where they receive help from the rest of the 3rd Recon to rescue and escape with Piña, Hamilton and the Emperor. Meanwhile, Pina is dragged into the throne room to be judged by Zorzal for being a traitor, only to be stopped by the arrival of Itami, Lelei and Rory. Despite Zorzal having a giant Ogre fight them, the Ogre is easily killed and Zorzal is forced to give up Piña after Itami threatens to kill Zorzal if he continues harming his friends. With their targets rescued, Itami and the rest escapes from the Imperial capital and the Imperial army are destroyed by modern weapons. After recovering and realizing that Zorzal will never make peace with Japan, the Emperor decides to make Piña his heir, even though it will lead to a civil war between his children. Zorzal and his supporters are forced to leave the Imperial capital, with Zorzal vowing revenge against the Japanese and he is traumatized for life by guns. Even though achieving her goal of destroying the empire, Thule is seen crying. Ten days later in Italica, Piña is crowned as Crown Princess of the Empire, vowing to bring peace between the Empire and Japan. Itami skips Piña's coronation to attend a doujin convention, but much to his frustration Lelei, Tuka and Rory have followed him, causing a ruckus with the crowd and them being taken into protective custody by the police.
