= A Wild Last Boss Appeared! =

Japanese light novel series

- First light novel volume cover, featuring Lufas Maphaahl (left) and Dina (right)

野生のラスボスが現れた！ (Yasei no Rasu Bosu ga Arawareta!)
- Genre: Dark fantasy; Isekai
- Novel series
- Written by: Firehead
- Published by: Shōsetsuka ni Narō
- Original run: October 1, 2015 – April 15, 2019
- Light novel
- Written by: Firehead
- Illustrated by: YahaKo
- Published by: Earth Star Entertainment
- English publisher: NA: J-Novel Club
- Imprint: Earth Star Novel
- Original run: February 15, 2016 – April 15, 2019
- Volumes: 9
- Manga
- Written by: Firehead
- Illustrated by: Tsubasa Hazuki
- Published by: Earth Star Entertainment
- English publisher: NA: J-Novel Club
- Imprint: Earth Star Comics
- Magazine: Comic Earth Star
- Original run: June 7, 2017 – present
- Volumes: 12
- Anime television series
- Directed by: Yūya Horiuchi
- Written by: Kazuyuki Fudeyasu
- Music by: TECHNOBOYS PULCRAFT GREEN-FUND
- Studio: Wao World
- Licensed by: Crunchyroll: SA/SEA: Tropics Entertainment
- Original network: Tokyo MX, BS Asahi, Kansai TV (S1-2); NCC, HTB (S2)
- Original run: October 4, 2025 – present
- Episodes: 21
- icon

A Wild Last Boss Appeared! (野生のラスボスが現れた！, Yasei no Rasu Bosu ga Arawareta!) is a Japanese light novel series written by Firehead and illustrated by YahaKo. It was initially serialized on the user-generated novel publishing website Shōsetsuka ni Narō from October 2015 to April 2019, before being acquired and published by Earth Star Entertainment under their Earth Star Novel imprint from February 2016 to April 2019. A manga adaptation illustrated by Tsubasa Hazuki began serialization on Earth Star Entertainment's Comic Earth Star website in June 2017. An anime television series adaptation produced by Wao World aired from October to December 2025. A second season premiered in October 2026.

== Plot ==
Exgate Online is an MMO dominated by a single player's avatar—Lufas Maphaahl, the "unofficial last boss". Since others cannot enjoy the game like this, she faces off against the other top players in a "final battle" and, as planned, is intentionally defeated. After the battle, the player receives an in-game prompt from the Goddess of Creation of the game's setting, offering him a "new role". Assuming this to be a message from the game's developers, the player promptly accepts, after which he finds himself in the body of his avatar, 200 years after her defeat. Learning that her NPC subordinates—the Twelve Heavenly Stars—are on a rampage, Lufas sets off on a journey to stop them, all while having to bear with her infamy as the Black-Winged Conqueror who once subjugated the world.

== Characters ==
=== Main characters ===
Lufas Maphaahl (ルファス・マファール, Rufasu Mafāru)
Voiced by: Ami Koshimizu, Kensho Ono (Lufas' male human Avatar)
The formerly male #1 player of the MMO Exgate Online who was transported to the world of the game in the body of his avatar. As Lufas, she sets out to gather her subordinates, the Twelve Heavenly Stars. Throughout the journey, she begins to recall Lufas's memories from her past in this world, wondering about the "real" Lufas' whereabouts as she occupies her body. In the past, Lufas was mistreated by her own people, especially her father, which led her to run away from home and become a tyrant.
Dina (ディーナ, Dīna)
Voiced by: Yuri Usui
Lufas' advisor; a background character who was decoration for Lufas' castle in Exgate Online. Being knowledgeable about the world, Lufas brings her along on her journey but grows increasingly suspicious of her, and she is eventually revealed to really be Venus (ヴィーナス, Vīnasu) of the Demon Lord's generals, the Seven Luminaires. After her cover is blown, she alleges to be an Exgate Online beta tester who was transported into the game and seemingly swears allegiance to her, but secretly continues to cooperate with the Demon Lord behind her back. Terra eventually fires her from the Seven Luminaries after realizing her ulterior motives. However, it is heavily implied that she has connections to Alovenus.

=== Twelve Heavenly Stars ===
They are Lufas's subordinates. After Lufas was defeated by the Seven Heroes, many of them wrecked havoc across the world until the day Lufas was revived. Lufas seeks to reunite with them to stop their rampage. Most members are monsters who can take human forms.

Aries (アリエス, Ariesu)
Voiced by: Yukina Shuto
One of the Twelve Heavenly Stars, representing the constellation Aries. He is a rainbow sheep, an extremely rare yet weak monster whom Lufas tamed and raised into one of the most powerful beings in the world. While his true form is a gigantic sheep, he normally takes on the appearance of a femboy. Following Lufas' defeat, he was manipulated by the demons into waging war against the nation of the hero Megrez to avenge her. However, he stops upon meeting the summoned Lufas and joins her.
Libra (リーブラ, Rībura)
Voiced by: Hisako Tōjō
One of the Twelve Heavenly Stars, representing the constellation Libra. She is a golem resembling a robotic maid. Following Lufas' defeat, she has been guarding her treasures, neglecting herself in the process, until she meets with the summoned Lufas, who repairs her, after which she joins her. It is later revealed that she was created by the blacksmith king Mizar.
Aigokeros (アイゴケロス, Aigokerosu)
Voiced by: Naoya Uchida
One of the Twelve Heavenly Stars, representing the constellation Capricorn. He is a high-level monster whom Lufas tamed. While his true form is a demonic goat, he normally takes on the appearance of an elderly butler. Following Lufas' defeat, he began aiding the demons in waging war against the nation of the hero Merak to avenge her. However, he stops upon meeting the summoned Lufas and joins her.
Parthenos (パルテノス, Parutenosu)
Voiced by: Mika Kanai
A former member of the Twelve Heavenly Stars, representing the constellation Virgo. She was a human priestess of the world's goddess until she became disillusioned and joined Lufas. Following Lufas' defeat, she began guarding her hometown before dying and becoming a ghost in the 200 years before the summoned Lufas' arrival. As a result, she could not join the summoned Lufas after meeting her, prompting her to have her adoptive granddaughter, Virgo, replace her.
Virgo (ウィルゴ, Wirugo)
Voiced by: Kokoro Omori
Parthenos' adoptive granddaughter and replacement among the Twelve Heavenly Stars, representing the constellation Virgo. A member of the Heaven-Winged race, she grew up isolated from the outside world. Upon meeting the summoned Lufas, Parthenos has her join the Twelve Heavenly Stars as her replacement. She is later revealed to be the hero Merak's biological daughter. Sei appears to have a crush on her.
Karkinos (カルキノス, Karukinosu)
Voiced by: Ryōta Suzuki
One of the Twelve Heavenly Stars, representing the constellation Cancer. He is a high-level monster whom Lufas tamed. While his true form is a gigantic crab, he normally takes on the appearance of a cook. Following Lufas' defeat, he became the only one amongst his colleagues who did not go on a rampage, instead simply opening a restaurant in the dwarf nation of Blutgang so he can gain information, until he rejoins Lufas after she stumbles upon him by chance.
Scorpius (スコルピウス, Sukorupiusu)
Voiced by: Chiaki Takahashi
One of the Twelve Heavenly Stars, representing the constellation Scorpio. She is a high-level monster whom Lufas tamed. While her true form is a gigantic scorpion, she normally takes on the appearance of a dark-clad woman in a revealing outfit. Following Lufas' defeat, she got corrupted by Alovenus and began waging war against the nation of the hero Mizar to avenge the former with some help from the Luminary Luna. However, she rejoins Lufas after reuniting with and being defeated by her, and after Dina/Venus removes Alovenus's influence on her. She is very obsessive with Lufas, which proves to be an annoyance to her other subordinates.
Castor
One of the Twelve Heavenly Stars, who pilots a flying pirate ship. He and his sister are a part of a being called Gemini, who represents the constellation Gemini. They were entrusted with the Key to Reach the Heavens by Lufas. He can fly and summon powerful spiritual warriors. In the present, he fought Orm when he tried to steal the Key. After his ship was destroyed and he lost the Key to Orm, he joined Lufas's group.
Sagittarius
One of the Twelve Heavenly Stars, who is a skilled archer and centaur, as well as the leader of his village. He represents the constellation Sagittarius. He briefly resides in Draupnir disguised as a human, and was forced to ally with Leon to secure the rights for demihumans in the world so they wouldn't be treated like monsters under the threat of his village being destroyed and therefore doesn't rejoin Lufas, but he has no idea that he and Leon are being used by Alovenus.
Leon
One of the Twelve Heavenly Stars who represents the constellation Leo. He plotted to take over as the new leader of the Twelve Heavenly Stars after Lufas was defeated with the intention of ensuring that demihumans won't be treated as a threat by other species; however, he is actually being manipulated by Alovenus. Sagittarius was forced to ally with him by threatening to destroy his village. He also doesn't rejoin Lufas.

=== Seven Heroes ===
A legendary group of heroes who defeated Lufas many years ago. Half of the members are long deceased in the present time.

Alioth (アリオト, Arioto)
Voiced by: Shunsuke Takeuchi
The leader of the Seven Heroes who defeated Lufas. Being human, he died in the 200 years before Lufas' resurrection.
Megrez (メグレズ, Megurezu)
Voiced by: Tomoaki Maeno
One of the Seven Heroes who defeated Lufas 200 years ago. Being a long-lived elf, he is still alive in the present and founded the nation of Svel. He has lost half of his stats due to a curse that Orm placed on him. However, he has become dejected, believing that defeating Lufas was a mistake. Fortunately, he cheers up somewhat after meeting the summoned Lufas and learning that she bears no grudges. Later, Sei's group came to ask him if he knows how to defeat Lufas and Orm and although he doesn't have the solution that they seek, he secretly tells Sei about Alovenus and the golden apples that Sei can use to power himself up, but only Lufas can create those.
Merak (メラク, Meraku)
Voiced by: Daisuke Hirakawa
One of the Seven Heroes who defeated Lufas 200 years ago, and the ruler of the nation of Gjallarhorn. Being a member of the long-lived Heaven-Winged race, he is still alive in the present day, but has lost his right wing following a battle with Orm. Though a king, he is privately depressed with his position, believing Lufas was a far better ruler than himself. Fortunately, he ultimately regains his resolve following a scolding from the summoned Lufas. He is later revealed to be Virgo's biological father.
Benetnasch (ベネトナシュ, Benetonashu)
Voiced by: Satomi Akesaka
One of the Seven Heroes who defeated Lufas 200 years ago, and the ruler of the nation of Mjolnir. As a long-lived vampire, she is still alive in the present day. In truth, she did not fight Lufas alongside the other heroes 200 years ago, as she wanted to fight her one-on-one, but was interrupted by the other heroes. Upon meeting the summoned Lufas in the present day, she immediately picked a fight with her in her domain, wanting to finish their duel, but not before having to give Lufas a tour around Mjolnir as she wished to explore the city first.
Mizar
One of the Seven Heroes who defeated Lufas 200 years ago, and the creator of Libra and Blutgang. He is also a blacksmith and the former king of Blutgang. Compared to the other heroes, he felt remorse for defeating Lufas and tried to defeat Orm to atone for his actions, but was killed. Though he is long deceased, copies of his memories and personalities were transferred into a golem that resembles a crystal in Blutgang.
Dubhe
One of the Seven Heroes who defeated Lufas 200 years ago. He founded Draupnir, a city inhabited by beastfolk, where he previously served as its ruler. Like most of the heroes, he is long deceased.

=== Demons ===
They are actually pawns made by Alovenus and must kill to survive, but they turned against Alovenus as they seek to be free of their roles.

Orm (オルム, Orumu)
Voiced by: Show Hayami
The Demon Lord and the original final boss of Exgate Online. Being a long-lived demon, he is still alive in the present day and is waging war against humanity, having already conquered most of Lufas' former territories. He is actually a pawn to Alovenus, who made him and the other demons using spells, but he secretly grew tired of being used and seeks to put an end to the goddess's scheme, therefore turning against her. He also has a son named Terra.
Mars (マルス, Marusu)
Voiced by: Miyu Irino
One of the Demon Lord's generals, the Seven Luminaries, representing the planet Mars. He manipulated Aries into waging war against the country of the hero Megrez, only to have his plot foiled by the summoned Lufas. He met his end at the hands of Dina/Venus, who was manipulating him.
Jupiter (ユピテル, Yupiteru)
Voiced by: Yoshitsugu Matsuoka
One of the Demon Lord's generals, the Seven Luminaires, representing the planet Jupiter. He cooperated with Aigokeros to wage war against the country of the hero Merak by exploiting the nation's problems with prejudice. He is eventually defeated and killed by Libra, but also finds out that Dina is actually his fellow Luminary Venus, who was manipulating him all along, before his death.
Luna
One of the Demon Lord's generals, the Seven Luminaries, representing the Moon. She is also an assassin. She worked with Scorpius to attack Blutgang after being advised to do this by Dina/Venus to earn the respect of her lover Terra. After being defeated by Aigokeros, she retreats with Terra after the latter rescues her. She and Terra soon learn of Dina/Venus's ulterior motives. She and Terra are also good friends with Mercurius.
Terra
Orm's son, who resembles a handsome warrior unlike the other demons. He is Luna's lover and deeply cares for her, and is good friends with Mercurius. He is also aware of Alovenus's manipulative game. After learning of Dina/Venus's manipulative game, he kicks her out of the Seven Luminaries; however, he has no idea that she was secretly collaborating with his father. Unlike the other demons, he is a puppet made by Orm himself instead of Alovenus.
Sol
The leader of the Seven Luminaries, who is different from the other demons.
Mercurius
One of the Seven Luminaries, representing the planet Mercury. His body is made of water that allows him to shapeshift. He is good friends with Luna and Terra. He plans to steal a magical elixir from Draupnir to trade for the GM Key from Orm to ensure the devilfolks' survival. After being empowered by Alovenus, he turns himself into a powerful ball of water, but Lufas and Virgo eventually defeat him for good.

=== Hero's Party ===
A group of heroes formed to defeat Lufas and Orm. The party started out with Sei, Friedrich, the Vice Captain, Kross, Alfie, and a group of rangers. After their first encounter with Orm and Lufas, Alfie resigned from the group as she was terrified of how powerful Orm and Lufas are while the rangers left for unknown reasons. Gantz and Hawk's Eye joined the party, serving as replacements for Alfie and the rangers. Later, after most members of Hawk's Eye suffer serious injuries that forced them to remain out of the journey, Petto joined the group. The team eventually allied with Lufas upon seeing that she is no longer their enemy.

Sei Minamijūji (南十字瀬衣, Minamijūji Sei)
Voiced by: Shun Horie
A teenage boy from Earth summoned as a hero by the other world's inhabitants to defeat Lufas and the Demon Lord. He serves as the leader of the Hero's Party and seems to have feelings for Virgo.
Gantz
A strong mercenary who helps defend Svel from threats. He is Alfie's father. He later joins the Hero's Party after his daughter left out of fear.
Jean
The leader of a group of adventurers called Hawk's Eye. He and his party aid Lufas with confronting Libra and later join the Hero's Party after Alfie and the rangers left the group.
Nick
A light warrior who is a member of Hawk's Eye.
Richard
A member of Hawk's Eye.
Shu
An archer who is a member of Hawk's Eye as well as the only female member of the group.
Friedrich
A tiger beast-man who is a powerful swordsman. He trains Sei and later joins the Hero's Party. He does not speak English, though the Vice Captain and Petto can understand him. He is Petto younger brother, even though he's bigger than Petto.
Vice Captain
An unnamed vice captain who joins the Hero's Party. She can understand Friedrich. It is implied that she is actually a beastfolk.
Kross the Acolyte
An elf archer who joins the Hero's Party. He is highly terrified of Lufas's group, but also knowledgeable about them.
Alfie
Gantz's daughter. She is a mage who originally joined the Hero's Party, but quickly resigned after seeing how powerful Orm and Lufas are and is replaced by her father.
Petto
The cat-like head warrior of Draupnir. He is Friedrich's older brother, even though the latter is taller than him. Unlike Friedrich, Petto can speak basic English. He can also understand Friedrich. He joins the Hero's Party after some of their members are too injured to continue the journey.

=== Others ===
Alovenus (アロヴィナス, Arovinasu)
The Goddess of Creation who transported Lufas's player into the game's world, putting him in the body of his avatar. She is eventually revealed to be the series' true main antagonist, having created the demons and other monsters to keep the world's inhabitants in a state of constant struggle, manipulating Lufas, Orm, and their minions to do her dirty work. She also has a son, who is a member of Lufas's group. It is hinted that Dina/Venus has connections to her.
Tanaka
A sentient RV that serves as a means of transportation for Lufas's group. He is actually a golem that was created to resemble an RV by Lufas. He is also capable of transforming into a jet.
Levia
A water golem who protects Svel and obeys orders from Megrez.
Jenner
The supreme commander of Blutgang, who is at war with Scorpius and Luna, which soon came to an end after Lufas intervenes.
Scales Corps
Four replicas of Libra who serve Blutgang. They have white hair compared to the original Libra, who has brown hair. They were used in the battle against Scorpius, to which one of them blows herself up in a failed attempt to defeat Scorpius. They are respectful towards the original Libra and Lufas.
Sarge
A member of a group of monsters who serve Leon.
Suzuki
Another RV-like golem that Lufas created for Castor, Virgo, and Sei's group to use as a means of transportation. It is the same as Tanaka, though with a different design.
Derby
An elderly centaur from Sagittarius, who secretly opposes his leader's allegiance with Leon.

== Media ==
=== Light novel ===
Written by Firehead, A Wild Last Boss Appeared! was initially serialized on the user-generated novel publishing website Shōsetsuka ni Narō from October 1, 2015, to April 15, 2019, before being acquired and published by Earth Star Entertainment under their Earth Star Novel light novel imprint with illustrations by YahaKo in nine volumes, from February 15, 2016, to April 15, 2019. The series is licensed digitally in North America by J-Novel Club.

No.	Original release date	Original ISBN	North American release date	North American ISBN
1	February 15, 2016	978-4-8030-0872-2	July 12, 2020	978-1-7183-0216-7
2	June 15, 2016	978-4-8030-0934-7	September 30, 2020	978-1-7183-0218-1
3	October 15, 2016	978-4-8030-0963-7	January 11, 2021	978-1-7183-0220-4
4	April 15, 2017	978-4-8030-1035-0	April 7, 2021	978-1-7183-0222-8
5	September 15, 2017	978-4-8030-1111-1	July 2, 2021	978-1-7183-0224-2
6	December 15, 2017	978-4-8030-1142-5	September 17, 2021	978-1-7183-0226-6
7	April 16, 2018	978-4-8030-1180-7	January 3, 2022	978-1-7183-0228-0
8	October 16, 2018	978-4-8030-1236-1	April 8, 2022	978-1-7183-0230-3
9	April 15, 2019	978-4-8030-1282-8	July 15, 2022	978-1-7183-0232-7

=== Manga ===
A manga adaptation illustrated by Tsubasa Hazuki began serialization on Earth Star Entertainment's Comic Earth Star on June 7, 2017, with its chapters collected into twelve tankōbon volumes as of October 2026. The manga is also licensed in North America by J-Novel Club.

No.	Original release date	Original ISBN	North American release date	North American ISBN
1	December 15, 2017	978-4-8030-1135-7	March 27, 2024	978-1-7183-3811-1
1. "Possession"; 2. "Subjugation"; 3. "Enemy Encounter"; 4. "Collision"; 5. "Showdown"; Bonus
2	April 12, 2018	978-4-8030-1174-6	July 17, 2024	978-1-7183-3813-5
6. "One Shot"; 7. "Interview"; 8. "Expedition"; 9. "Retrieval"; 10. "Memories"; Bonus
3	September 12, 2018	978-4-8030-1225-5	October 9, 2024	978-1-7183-3815-9
11. "Encounter"; 12. "Pursuit"; 13. "Tension"; 14. "Detection"; 15. "Double Agent"; Bonus
4	April 12, 2019	978-4-8030-1284-2	January 1, 2025	978-1-7183-3817-3
16. "Royal Decree"; 17. "Advent"; 18. "Fighting Frenzy"; 19. "Hometown"; 20. "Counterstrike"
5	October 12, 2019	978-4-8030-1344-3	March 26, 2025	978-1-7183-3819-7
21. "Warship"; 22. "Melee"; 23. "Investigation"; 24. "Rampage"; 25. "Suspicion"
6	March 12, 2020	978-4-8030-1399-3	June 18, 2025	978-1-7183-3821-0
7	September 12, 2020	978-4-8030-1450-1	September 10, 2025	978-1-7183-3823-4
8	March 12, 2021	978-4-8030-1499-0	December 3, 2025	978-1-7183-3825-8
9	March 13, 2024	978-4-8030-1920-9	February 25, 2026	978-1-7183-3830-2
10	February 12, 2025	978-4-8030-2073-1	April 22, 2026	978-1-7183-3835-7
11	November 12, 2025	978-4-8030-2214-8	August 26, 2026	978-1-7183-3839-5
12	October 9, 2026	978-4-8030-2214-8	—	—

=== Anime ===
On August 23, 2024, during NBCUniversal Entertainment Japan's panel at Anime NYC, an anime television series adaptation was announced. It is produced by Wao World with Wowmax handling general production, and directed by Yūya Horiuchi, with Kazuyuki Fudeyasu overseeing series composition, Maiko Ebisawa designing the characters, and Technoboys Pulcraft Green-Fund composing the music. The series aired from October 4 to December 20, 2025, on Tokyo MX and other networks. The opening theme song is "Level wo Agete Butsuri de Naguru" (レベルを上げて物理で殴る; 'Level Up and Beat the Laws of Nature'), performed by Kisida Kyodan & The Akebosi Rockets, while the ending theme song is "Migi Hidari" (ミギヒダリ; 'Right and Left'), performed by Yuka Nagase. Crunchyroll is streaming the series. Tropics Entertainment licensed the series in South and Southeast Asia for streaming on the Tropics Anime Asia YouTube channel.

After the airing of the final episode, a second season was announced, with the staff and cast reprising their roles, which premiered on October 3, 2026. The opening theme song is "Melodic Impact", performed by Suspended 4th, while the ending theme song is "Yurete Skirt" (揺れてスカート; 'Swaying Skirt'), performed by Chakura.

==== Season 1 ====
No. overall	No. in season	Title	Directed by (Note: Production staff information is taken from the ending credits of each episode.)	Written by	Storyboarded by	Original release date (Note: Episodes are released on ABEMA, U-NEXT and Crunchyroll a week before their televised airings.)
1	1	"A Wild Last Boss Appears!"; Transliteration: "Yasei no Rasu Bosu ga Arawareta!" (Japanese: 野生のラスボスが現れた！)	Yūya Horiuchi	Kazuyuki Fudeyasu	Yūya Horiuchi	October 4, 2025
In the online game Exgate, one of the top players, who plays as Lufas Maphaahl, the game's final boss, fights the other top players, who play as the Seven Heroes. She eventually allows the heroes to defeat and imprison her, as the game had grown boring for her as the unopposed ruler of the world, but also informs the heroes of the Demon Lord Orm. Exgate's goddess Alovenus offers the player a chance to enter the game, which he accepts. The player awakens as Lufas herself, accidentally summoned by the king of the Laevateinn Nation 200 years after her defeat. The player learns from the king that Exgate has become a real world in which Orm is still undefeated. The king had tried to summon a hero, but unsealed Lufas by accident. She assures the king she has no evil plans and wishes to live anonymously. Lufas returns to her home, the Sky Tower, and finds that her NPC advisor Dina has gained sentience. From her, she learns that the Seven Heroes each founded their own nation. Four died from old age while three survived due to their species longer lifespans, and that they have failed to defeat Orm. Lufas decides to discover if the three surviving heroes are Exgate players. She also decides to search for the Twelve Heavenly Stars, her NPC servants, but she needs money first. Dina warns Lufas she could still be recognized by the world's inhabitants, so the only way to earn money would be anonymously as adventurers. They travel to Ydalir City in disguise and take a job exterminating orcs in Aisle Village, which Lufas completes with ease.
2	2	"We Came to Svel!"; Transliteration: "Suveru-koku e Yattekita!" (Japanese: スヴェル国へやってきた！)	Lin Ying Chen	Kazuyuki Fudeyasu	Yūya Horiuchi	October 11, 2025
After harvesting the orcs' meat and rescuing the women that the orcs kidnapped, Lufas destroys their hideout and returns the women to Aisle Village using a large golem. Lufas is curious as to why no other adventurers accepted the quest. Dina explains that combat standards have declined. In Exgate, players like Lufas often exceeded level 1000, but now that Exgate is a real world, warriors are often killed before reaching 100, and the time needed to reach 1000 would exceed a human lifetime. As they are hiding her identity, Dina claims that Lufas is Lady Sfalu (to the latter's annoyance), and they leave the golem to protect the village. Having earned enough money, they travel to Svel, the Water City, which has been repeatedly attacked by Heavenly Star Aries the Ram, trying to kill the surviving elf hero Megrez to avenge Lufas' defeat. There, Lufas requests a mercenary named Gantz to show them to a library. Gantz reveals that the lake surrounding Svel is actually a titanic water golem named Levia created by Megrez, so Aries can't enter Svel. At the library, Lufas discovers books blaming the heroes for defeating her, which allowed the devil-folk to invade. Lufas is furious to discover that humans are running out of places to live as Orm and the devil-folk have captured almost all the peaceful territory that once belonged to her. An earthquake strikes Svel, with Lufas revealing that Aries possesses an earthquake-causing ability. The two head to Aries' domain on a flying platform that Lufas created.
3	3	"Aries Has Attacked!"; Transliteration: "Ariesu ga Semetekita!" (Japanese: アリエスが攻めてきた！)	Hiroshi Kubo	Kazuyuki Fudeyasu	Yūya Horiuchi	October 18, 2025
In the past, Lufas took in a rainbow sheep, naming it Aries and making it one of her subordinates. Back in the present, Gantz leads an army against Aries's forces while Megrez sends out Levia to help. Watching this from a distance, Lufas worries that Aries won't stand a chance against Levia and discovers that Megrez is cursed by Orm, cutting off half of his stats. Aries arrives and fights Levia, but is overwhelmed; however, he escapes as he is very cunning. Lufas intervenes and Megrez recognizes her. He also warns Lufas that someone is manipulating Aries. Lufas confronts Aries, who doubts that she is his master, so Lufas fights him to prove it. After Lufas wins the fight, Aries takes the form of a young human girl and apologizes to Lufas for his actions. He decides to join her, but also doesn't give Dina much attention.
4	4	"They Were Pulling Strings Behind the Scenes!"; Transliteration: "Ura de Ito o Hīteita!" (Japanese: 裏で糸を引いていた！)	Shun Tsuchida	Kazuyuki Fudeyasu	Shun Tsuchida	October 25, 2025
Lufas questions Aries about his motives and he explains that he wants revenge on the heroes, who had betrayed Lufas in the past. After convincing Aries to give up revenge, Lufas suspects that someone is pulling the strings behind the recent events. In Orm's domain, the Luminary Mars prepares to invade Svel with an army of devils in hopes to kill Megrez, revealing that he was using Aries to weaken Svel's defenses. However, his army is suddenly wiped out by Lufas and Aries, though Mars doesn't recognize the former and thinks she's one of the heroes, while Lufas deduces that Mars is the one who manipulated Aries. Disappointed with Aries's betrayal, Mars prepares to fight them and unleashes powerful attacks. Lufas swiftly counters Mars's attacks and sends him flying, but not before Mars catches her true appearance. Dina arrives and tells them about Mars's history. Lufas then turns the defeated devils into her minions and orders them to return to their habitats. The next day, Lufas informs Megrez of their success in stopping the attack and he leads the group to his study. Lufas suspects that he is still one of the other top players, but when she reveals her true appearance to Megrez, she senses that he is different now. She also tells Megrez how she was unleashed and has no hatred towards the heroes for betraying her, which led to the devil folks attacking. After healing Levia, Lufas continues her journey to find the rest of the Twelve Heavenly Stars and Dina gives her the location of one of them: Libra of the Scales, a powerful robotic maid-like golem who is guarding a tomb that belongs to Lufas and also houses ancient weapons that no one has been able to obtain. Megrez asks her to get some of those weapons for him and also provides her with a new disguise as she and her group leave. They also bid farewell to Gantz, who almost figures out Lufas's true identity. Meanwhile, Mars crash-lands in a forest where he is disintegrated by a mysterious woman.
5	5	"A Wild Hot Spring Appeared!"; Transliteration: "Yasei no Onsen ga Arawareta!" (Japanese: 野生の温泉が現れた！)	Lin Ying Chen	Momoko Murakami	Hiroshi Kubo	November 1, 2025
While on their way to Lufas' tomb, Lufas creates a golem in the shape of an RV whom she names Tanaka for faster travel. They stop at a hot spring for the night, but Aries doesn't want to go into it yet since he is actually a guy. While bathing, Lufas feels conflicted by her original male self, who was quite perverted. After they are finished, Aries goes into the hot springs next. The next day, the three reach the dungeon housing the tomb, but find a village built near it. It turns out the dungeon has become a tourist attraction. Aries at first considers ridding the place of people, but is ordered not to by Lufas. They learn that a reconnaissance team has almost made it to the tomb's entrance, so they decide to go into the dungeon despite warnings from a group of adventurers called Hawk's Eye that they may not survive. The three encounter a golem that Lufas created years ago, who recognizes its master, but attacks Dina as it fails to identify her as an ally. Hawk's Eye comes to their aid, but the golem is too powerful for them. Aries helps them defeat the golem. Both groups introduce each other and team up to reach the tomb. Making it to the entrance, Hawk's Eye encounter Libra, who demands that they leave. The team's attempts to reason with Libra fails, leading her to attack them.
6	6	"Libra of the Scales Appeared!"; Transliteration: "Tenbin no Rībura ga Arawareta!" (Japanese: 天秤のリーブラが現れた！)	Naoki Miki	Momoko Murakami	Yō✭Nakano	November 8, 2025
Continuing their way through the dungeon, the team fights another golem, with Lufas managing to deactivate it. They encounter an even stronger golem, the Gatekeeper. Lufas confronts the golem, but it fails to recognize her until she defeats it. She prepares to go ahead, but Hawk's Eye begin to wonder who is she really is considering the fact that she easily defeated the golem and knows Libra. She dismisses this and just tells them to leave. Confronting Libra, Lufas reveals her true form. However, Libra is revealed to be malfunctioning and does not recognize her, forcing Lufas to fight her. Lufas eventually fixes Libra and she at last recognizes Lufas before shutting down. Lufas reunites with the others and finds that Dina has put Hawk's Eye in a trance to make them forget about Lufas's group; therefore, revealing that Hawk's Eye's earlier confrontation with Libra was a false memory. Entering the tomb, Lufas is revealed to have an obsession with gold. After gathering all the weapons, Dina sends them along with the remaining golems to the Sky Tower. At this point, Hawk's Eye snap out of their trance and believe that they conquered the dungeon. After Libra is reactivated, she decides to join the group. The group's next stop is a village called Vanaheim, built by Parthenos the Maiden, another one of the Twelve Heavenly Stars, which is where Lufas previously lived.
7	7	"I Was... A Savior!"; Transliteration: "Kyūseishu......Datta!" (Japanese: 救世主......だった！)	Yūya Horiuchi	Megumu Sasano	Hiroshi Kubo	November 15, 2025
While on their way to Vanaheim, Lufas has a dream regarding her past self. Dina reveals that Lufas's kind, the heaven-winged, were driven out of the village and are living in Gjallarhorn, a city founded by Merak, one of the Seven Heroes. Lufas wonders if Merak is a player, unlike Megrez. Reaching Gjallarhorn, they see that the city is built along a cliffside and a civil war is ongoing between black and white winged, causing the city to be divided into two sections. Libra gives them a lift into the city, but attracts too much attention with her rocket boosters. Pretending to be merchants, the group stay in one of the inns. That night, Lufas has a nightmare regarding her avatar's past life, where her abusive father considers her a nuisance, while her ill mother is more supportive of her. This results in her running away from home and becoming a villainess. Waking up, Lufas is puzzled by this, as her player never wrote such a backstory for the character. She realizes that this world is not the world of the game, but an actual, real world, which leads her to wonder what has happened to the real Lufas's soul. Meanwhile, at the Demon Lord's castle, the Seven Luminaries learn of Mars' defeat and Lufas' return. Luminaries Venus and Jupiter are sent to observe her. Back in Gjallarhorn, Lufas's group attempt to find information on the heaven-winged conflict before meeting Merak. Aries also warns Lufas that Aigokeros, another one of the Twelve Heavenly Stars, may have allied with the devilfolk. Lufas visits a black temple dedicated to her, to which the priest considers her a hero to his kind and Merak a threat. While Dina waits at a white temple, Jupiter attempts to ambush her, but Libra intervenes. Aries encounters Aigokeros, who intends to eliminate the remaining Seven Heroes and invites Aries to join him.
8	8	"Hey! 5%?! Seriously?!"; Transliteration: "Cho―Go Pāsento―Maji ka!? Datta" (Japanese: ちょ―5%―マジか！？だった)	Lin Ying Chen	Megumu Sasano	Kazuhisa Takenouchi	November 22, 2025
Merak, who is revealed to be a white winged himself, is pressured by his subjects to summon a hero who can eliminate the black winged, but he doesn't know what to do. In the past, Merak had considered Lufas a hero when she fought for equal rights between the heaven-winged. Jupiter is outmatched by Libra and is forced to retreat. Aries turns down Aigokeros's offer and reveals that Lufas is alive, but he can't rejoin her until he eliminates the remaining heroes and the devilfolks. Dina overhears a group of white winged planning to eliminate the black winged behind Merak's back, and Jupiter is helping them. Lufas's group reunite to reveal their discovers while Aries keeps his encounter with Aigokeros a secret. They plan to capture Jupiter, but not kill him. Meanwhile, Venus arrives to help Jupiter by keeping Libra preoccupied. Growing suspicious of Dina due to her teleportation magic, Lufas and Libra interrogate her, but turn up with nothing. After Dina and Libra leave, the city is attacked by Jupiter, and a dark forcefield hexes the citizens to wage war against each other while Lufas observes from outside of the city.
9	9	"The Masses Have Rioted!"; Transliteration: "Minshū no Bōdō ga Okita!" (Japanese: 民衆の暴動が起きた！)	Bo Yamada	Megumu Sasano	Hiroyuki Fukushima & Yūya Horiuchi	November 29, 2025
Lufas meets up with Aries and deduces that the devilfolks are manipulating the people into fighting each other, and intend to stop them. She also assumes that the dark magic is Aigokeros's doing. With his work done, Jupiter attempts to leave, but Libra attacks him at the last second; Venus apparently didn't keep her preoccupied long enough. She is too powerful for Jupiter to defeat, forcing him to run from her and he eventually surrenders. Aries goes to confront Aigokeros, trying to get him to stop. Aries proves to be no match for Aigokeros, but Lufas saves him and in response, Aigokeros comes to his senses and breaks down into tears upon seeing that his master really is alive. Deciding to not help the devilfolks anymore, Aigokeros takes the form of a human butler and removes the forcefield before disappearing into Lufas's shadow, but also warns her that the heaven-winged are still clashing with each other. Dina arrives and offers to stop the war. They go to see the conflict as Merak comes out to try and calm things down. They notice that he is missing a wing, as he is also cursed by Orm. Libra arrives with the captured Jupiter and Dina explains everything to the citizens. Jupiter discovers that Dina is actually Venus (also revealing that it was she who killed Mars) and attempts to attack her as revenge for her betrayal, but Libra swiftly kills him. Later, Lufas reveals herself to Merak and he considers himself not worthy to be king, but Lufas convinces him to get over his guilt, but her group will not be able to assist him any further. As they leave, Lufas learns that photos don't exist in this world and decides to talk to Dina alone. Meanwhile, Merak has regained his confidence and arrests the white winged who helped plan the attack. In another area, a woman named Benetnasch learns of Lufas's approach and Aries's disappearance. She plans to kill Lufas.
10	10	"Who Are You?"; Transliteration: "Sonata wa Nanimono da!" (Japanese: 其方は何者だ！)	Shinichi Fukumoto	Michiru Tenma	Tomoya Tanaka	December 6, 2025
Alone with Dina, Lufas demands to know who she really is, and Dina reveals that she is actually another player from the real world who has the power to implant false memories in other characters to make them wage war against each other; however, she couldn't manipulate Lufas's memories. Dina is also revealed to be a beta tester with some administrative access to see player information. She also reveals herself to be Venus of the Seven Luminaries and had been working with the devilfolks so that Lufas and them will fight each other. She decides to challenge Lufas to a battle, and creates a forcefield around them to ensure no one else can interfere. Dina first appears powerful with the use of metal spikes and Exgate, but she is unable to keep up with Lufas due to being a backline mage. Lufas commends her for her skillful deceit and inquires about the reason for her deception. However, after failing to reason with Dina, Dina unleashes one final attack on Lufas and Gjallarhorn before leaving to higher ground. Lufas uses her own powerful attack to stop it. Having lost, Dina finally explains everything and reveals that the world is based on the novels that the game originated from and that the characters here are not players at all. She caused the war to defeat Orm in hopes of finding a way back to the real world. Because she couldn't beat Orm on her own, she reunited the Twelve Heavenly Stars and went undercover in the devilfolks' kingdom as Venus to cause war between both groups. Since Dina still maintains her loyalty to Lufas, she decides to continue serving Lufas just as Aigokeros, Libra, and Aries arrive. After providing a decent excuse to protect Dina, Aigokeros tells Lufas about two other members of the Twelve Heavenly Stars who are aiding the devilfolks and that Laevateinn has successfully summoned a hero this time. Meanwhile, in Laevateinn, the summoned hero appears to be an ordinary Japanese man.
11	11	"A Wild Lufas Maphaahl and a Wild Devil King Have Appeared at the Same Time!!!"; Transliteration: "Yasei no Rufasu・Mafāru to Yasei no Orumu ga Dōjini Arawareta!" (Japanese: 野生のルファス・マファールと野生のオルムが同時に現れた！)	Akira Sekigyō	Michiru Tenma	Itoguchi Hatsumita	December 13, 2025
Minamijuuji Sei, the summoned hero, was a high school student who is drawn by mysterious voices calling for help and is summoned to the game world by Laevateinn's king. The king requests for him to defeat Orm and Lufas. Sei dreams of being a police officer like his father and agrees to the task. He undergoes weeks of training with the master swordsman Friedrich, who doesn't speak the human language, though the vice captain can understand him. Sei is later given a team called the Hero's Party to accompany him: Friedrich, the vice captain, Kross the Acolyte, and Gantz's daughter Alfie. Megrez also provides them with steel golems to help his team along with a group of ten rangers. They suddenly come across Lufas and Orm. Sometime earlier, Lufas deduces that Sei's summoning is the work of Alioth, the leader of the Seven Heroes, and fears that the devilfolks will attack Sei. Dina explains that Alioth is long dead, but the barrier that he created still protects his nations. Lufas decides to head to Laevateinn alone, but also encounters Orm. The two engage in an overwhelming battle, but prove to be equally matched. Sei's party realize that they won't stand a chance against Orm and Lufas. Orm reveals that the real Lufas was even stronger and explains that he and the devilfolks are mere pawns to the goddess Alovenus, and that they must kill to survive. Lufas has never heard of this backstory, hinting that Orm is not who she thinks he is. Sei overhears them talking about Alovenus's plan, which Orm is trying to end. Libra helps Lufas escape while Orm speaks to Dina alone, who suspects that Alovenus has weakened Lufas's strength before they all leave the scene. The Hero's Party is left in shock.
12	12	"There Was Something Incredible in My Homeland!"; Transliteration: "Kokyō ni Tondemo nai Mono ga Sonzai Shita!" (Japanese: 故郷にとんでもないものが存在した！)	Yūsaku Saotome	Kazuyuki Fudeyasu	Yō✭Nakano	December 20, 2025
While traveling on Tanaka, Lufas is annoyed that she got pulled out of the battle, but the others explain that Orm is targeting her and not Sei's group. Several days later, the Hero's Party return to Laevateinn. Alfie has fled out of fear and the rangers have vanished. The king hires replacement party members: Gantz, Hawk's Eye, and the king himself, but the guards won't let him join. Sei feels frustrated by his team's quirks. Meanwhile, Lufas's group reach Vanaheim, passing through the barrier around the city, in search for Parthenos, but they instead meet her granddaughter Virgo, who is a heaven-winged. They learn that Parthenos passed away a long time ago, but her spirit is still here and is keeping the barrier up. Aigokeros foolishly destroys the barrier to lure Parthenos out, but it doesn't work. The group decide to visit Lufas's hometown, which is in a nearby mountain, to visit the grave of Lufas's mother, so Lufas turns Tanaka into a jet. Once there, Lufas remembers how horribly she had been treated in the past, making her subordinates angry over how their master was abused by her own people. At Lufas's old house, they learn that Lufas's father is long dead and meet Parthenos's ghost, who tells them more about Alovenus's ulterior motives and shows Lufas one of the slumbering Dragons of Heaven, who will awaken if the world is in danger. Visiting her mother's grave, Lufas is upset that Alovenus was just using her all this time. She decides to continue with the real Lufas's original goal and eventually face Alovenus.

==== Season 2 ====
No. overall	No. in season	Title	Directed by	Written by	Storyboarded by	Original release date
13	1	"Mobile Capital Blutgang Has Appeared!"; Transliteration: "Kidō Ōto Burūtogangu ga Arawareta!" (Japanese: 機動王都ブルートガングが現れた！)	Unknown	Unknown	TBA	October 3, 2026
After recalling past events, Lufas is determined to force out Alovenus and discover the real Lufas's goal. Since Parthenos can't go with Lufas, Virgo will take her place. The group depart on Tanaka in search for the remaining members of the Twelve Heavenly Stars. They decide to look for Scorpius, one of the Twelve Heavenly Stars, who is targeting a mobile city called Blutgang, which is inhabited by dwarves. Dina reveals that Karkinos, another one of the Twelve Heavenly Stars, is in Blutgang. The group set off to stop Scorpius. After several days, the group reach a gigantic battle tank, which is Blutgang itself, built by the blacksmith king Mizar. Entering the city inside the tank, they find that it has an artificial sky. Libra explains that she sees the mobile city as a little brother, revealing that she was also built by Mizar. Dina also reveals that the city can change to a humanoid form during emergences. While stopping at a restaurant, they discover that it is owned by Karkinos, who opened a restaurant here to gain information. He agrees to join them. At this point, Scorpius has arrived outside of the city and Blutgang is preparing to fight her and her army of giant scorpions. Blutgang's cannons do little to no damage to her, so Blutgang's commanders deploy golems to attack her. Supreme commander Jenner orders his men to fire the main cannon at Scorpius despite the fact that it will destroy the golems, though he assures them that the golems can be rebuilt. This destroys all the scorpions and some of the golems, but not Scorpius herself. After Scorpius destroys the rest of the golems, Jenner learns that devilfolks are attacking the city, confirming that Scorpius is helping the demons. Dina deducts that these devilfolks are led by Luna, one of the Seven Luminaries, who is also an assassin. Lufas and her team decide to capture Luna. Back outside, Jenner deploys the Scales Corps, golems who are copies of Libra, to attack Scorpius. Despite the Scales Corps being powerful, they are no match for Scorpius, until one of the golems triggers a self destruct sequence while near her.
14	2	"A Rampant Scorpius Appeared!"	Unknown	Unknown	TBA	October 10, 2026
The explosion fails to kill Scorpius. Lufas's group intervene, removing all the golems and destroying all the scorpions, who produce mana that are drawn to Lufas, but she wants it to go to Virgo instead so she can level up. Sometime earlier, the Hero's Party are still fighting their way across the world, but Sei feels uncomfortable with killing monsters. They arrive in Svel to speak to Megrez in hopes of finding information on how to defeat Lufas and Orm. Sei on the other hand begins to wonder the true motivations behind Lufas, Orm, and Alovenus's actions and why everyone hates Lufas and Orm. Meeting Megrez, they ask him of a way to make Sei level up and tell him about Benetnasch, one of the Seven Heroes. Megrez then tells them about Alovenus and reveals that he can't help them as he doesn't have the answers they seek. He talks to Sei alone regarding Alovenus's true intentions, the heroes' hatred towards Lufas, and Orm's rise to power, revealing that all monsters and devilfolks are controlled by Alovenus, but he doesn't know why though. The two deduct that Lufas is no longer their enemy and Sei convinces him to help. Megrez tells him to seek out an item called the golden apple to level up, which only Lufas can create. Meanwhile, Lufas learns about the golden apple, which is why mana is drawn to her. Dina tells her more about the history of mana and that the fruit is dangerous, so Lufas doesn't give it to Virgo. An insane Scorpius fights Lufas and Karkinos. The two eventually defeat her, but Lufas discovers that her strength is increasing. However, Scorpius is still standing and is using divine power, meaning that Alovenus is influencing her. Lufas prepares to fight Scorpius again.
15	3	"A Flying, Handsome Man Appeared!"	Unknown	Unknown	TBA	October 17, 2026
Jenner and Lufas's group watch Lufas fight Scorpius. Lufas is shown to be immune to Scorpius's poisonous attacks. During the battle, Lufas almost goes insane before regaining her senses, making her suspect that this is the real Lufas's doing. Remembering Orm's words, she wonders if her current self is the cause of her weakened strength. Scorpius then takes her true form: a giant scorpion, making Lufas see that she is gaining strength from Alovenus to empower herself. Lufas eventually defeats Scorpius and brings Dina along to break Alovenus's influence on her. Back in the city, Libra and Aries fight demons while continuing to hunt for Luna. They then talk about Lufas's original behavior as a villainess and wonders if Alovenus was influencing her too, also growing wary of Dina. Back outside, Dina is able to remove Alovenus's control over Scorpius as she has the same skill of Alovenus, making Lufas suspect that Dina is connected to the goddess and may not be who she says she is. Dina warns Lufas that doing this will make her an enemy to Alovenus, so Lufas agrees to protect her. Meanwhile, Luna is continuing her attack on Blutgang to earn the respect of her lover Terra, Orm's son, having been advised by Venus to do this after remembering Mars and Jupiter's defeat. Aigokeros then confronts Luna, who refuses to surrender, but Aigokeros is too powerful for her to defeat. Aigokeros reveals that she is just a pawn to Alovenus. Terra saves Luna, displeased with her for pushing herself too far. He and Luna then retreat, but not before Lufas spots them. After recognizing Lufas, Terra reveals to Luna that he and the other demons are being manipulated by someone. While talking about love interests, Lufas tells Dina that they are a male player. The surviving Scales Corps members then request for Lufas to meet Mizar, who is actually still alive.
16	4	"The Blacksmith King Mizar Appeared!"	Unknown	Unknown	TBA	October 24, 2026
Back at Orm's castle, Terra tells Luna about Sol, the leader of the Seven Luminaries, who is different from other demons, along with Venus's unusual abilities. Terra summons Venus regarding his father and her manipulation of Mars, Jupiter, Luna, and Lufas's subordinates. He then gets furious with Venus's manipulative game, but she refuses to explain with Luna around after revealing that she is nothing more than a puppet to Alovenus, leading Terra to kick Venus out of the Seven Luminaries, and Venus responses by threatening Luna before escaping. Back in Blutgang, Dina tells Lufas about Terra and that she is no longer a member of the Seven Luminaries. After Lufas's group reveal that they had dealt with all the demons, Libra meets her three copies, who bring her to Jenner, who happens to know who Lufas is. Jenner then shows Lufas a large crystal, which is really a golem with copies of Mizar's memories and personalities. An image of Mizar appears inside the crystal, who then reveals his backstory and why the heroes hated Lufas. The Mizar copy also reveals that his original self felt remorse for defeating Lufas, but was killed by Orm. He also explains that Orm has connections to Alovenus; he and the other demons are actually puppets created by the goddess's spells. Aigokeros knows of this and further explains the truth. Terra on the other hand is a puppet created by Orm himself. However, the demons soon turned against Alovenus due to disagreements with mankind, and that Alovenus has a son who is part of Lufas's group, which Lufas doesn't know of. Lufas also agrees to make more golems at the Mizar copy's request. Lufas creates a new weapon for Libra, and the dwarves take a liking to Tanaka, also giving him an upgrade. Lufas's group prepare to travel to a city called Alfheim. Meanwhile, Orm locates a flying ship piloted by Castor, another one of the Twelve Heavenly Stars, seeking something on his ship: the Key to Reach the Heavens that Lufas entrusted to him and his sister. Castor refuses to hand it over and fights Orm, destroying his forces with powerful glowing warriors and seemly killing Orm too, but Orm survives and wrecks his ship.
17	5	"The Hunting Festival Contestants Have Appeared!"	TBA	TBA	TBA	October 31, 2026
While Lufas's group are traveling on Tanaka, Scorpius has recovered and is doting on Lufas, to the annoyance of Libra and Aigokeros. Lufas breaks up the argument to avoid damaging Tanaka. Virgo begins to worry that she may not be of much help. Tanaka comes across a crowd of adventurers heading to a city called Draupnir, which is inhabited by beastfolk and was founded by Dubhe, one of the Seven Heroes, who is long deceased. Dina explains Dubhe's history and Scorpius reveals that the hunting festival is going on there, where adventurers hunt down captured monsters, and that she originally planned to use it to attack Draupnir after she was done with Blutgang. Lufas encourages Virgo to take part in the tournament and the group head to Draupnir. The Hero's Party have also arrived in Draupnir to take part in the festival and hopefully find out more about Lufas. In a flashback, Sei remembers Megrez telling him about how Lufas can create the golden apple, which is forbidden and caused a great downfall to the heaven-winged; Megrez didn't want to tell the others this as he knows that they will grow violent. Sei also remembers his father's past mistake and his decision to do what is right. Because they don't know much about Lufas, Megrez advises Sei to go to Draupnir to find Lufas. After the flashback ends, Sei is bothered by the fact that some adventurers are wearing revealing outfits. He and Jean see Lufas's group and Sei starts to develop feelings for Virgo. Later, Virgo is given a sword called La Pucelle by Lufas and Libra questions her about Dina's true nature and connections to Alovenus, but they decide to not interrogate her right now to keep her from fleeing. The next day, the tournament begins and Virgo proves to be faster and stronger than the other contestants as Jean and Sei, who are also competing, try to catch up with her. However, a T-rex-like monster called a dinogigant suddenly disrupts the tournament, as it is not part of the competition. As Jean and all the contestants fall back, Sei, Virgo, and three other contestants stay behind to fight the dinosaur. Virgo eventually defeats it and she and Sei speak to each other. The dinosaur then reveals that it survived, but is killed by someone; Lufas at first thought it was Libra, but Libra suspects that this is the work of Sagittarius the Archer, another one of the Twelve Heavenly Stars. Virgo is declared the winner of the tournament and Lufas's group celebrate with a feast. A messenger then arrives, requesting for Virgo to attend a meeting with Draupnir's emperor, and she agrees.
18	6	"The Twelve Heavenly Star, Sagittarius Appeared!"	TBA	TBA	TBA	November 7, 2026
Lufas agrees to send Virgo to meet Draupnir's emperor while the others look for Sagittarius. Lufas sends Aries to help Virgo to ensure that she gets stronger. The next day, Virgo, Sei, a disguised Aries, and two of the adventurers from the tournament meet Petto, Draupnir's head warrior, who plans to award them with a special elixir that Sei hopes to use to heal Megrez. One of the cat soldiers is revealed to be Mercurius, one of the Seven Luminaries who has water shapeshifting abilities, in disguise, who causes an explosion to wipe them out, but Virgo protects everyone, forcing the Mercurius to retreat. The two adventurers choose to not be involved in this conflict. Petto tells them of a sacred mountain called Hnitibjorg, where the elixer is, which cannot be accessed so easily, and is aware that the devilfolk may try to steal the elixir. Sei calls his party members to help him retrieve the elixir and Petto reveals that he is Friedrich's older brother. Virgo and Aries also join them. Meanwhile, Libra and Karkinos meet up with Sagittarius, who turns out to be the tournament announcer from earlier. He reveals his true centaur form and tells them about Leon, another one of the Twelve Heavenly Star, who secretly tried to take over as the new leader of the Twelve Heavenly Stars after Lufas was defeated. He also tells the story of centaurs being treated like monsters, which Leon is trying to rectify, but has gone rogue. Sagittarius himself has allied with Leon and battles Libra and Karkinos, but he eventually escapes. The Hero's Party reach Hnitibjorg and enter a cave where Aries wonders if the Vice Captain is actually a beastfolk, which the others disagree with. A flood of water strikes the team, but Virgo dispels it, leaving Kross wondering how she can do that before Sei reminds him to focus on their goal. Though some members suggest retreating, Sei chooses to keep going. The group continue their way through the cave and encounter more traps and floods. They eventually reach a secret chamber and confront Mercurius, who has the elixir and was the one who set the traps. He intends to eliminate Virgo due to her being a hinderance to his plans.
19	7	"The Seven Luminary Mercurius Appeared!"	TBA	TBA	TBA	November 14, 2026
In a flashback, Mercurius reveals that devilfolks must kill humans to survive, but even with humanity gone, they will still die. Luna requests Mercurius to infiltrate Draupnir on her behalf. Mercurius then asks for Orm to hand over a key called the GM Key that can set the devilfolks free from their role and will hand over Draupir's elixir in return. Back in the present, the Hero's Party are unable to do any harm to Mercurius as his body is made of water, but Virgo and Aries are able to stand a chance. Mercurius still refuses to give up and Alovenus contacts him. After swearing loyalty to her, he is granted immense power and transforms into a powerful ball of water. Aries holds him back and reveals himself to the others. The Hero's Party quickly escape the cave with the elixir with Virgo's help, but she then goes back inside to fight Mercurius as Aries, Aigokeros, Scorpius, Karkinos, and Libra all arrive in their monster forms and Grantz stops Sei from fighting them as they are too powerful. Lufas then arrives, which worries the Hero's Party. Her subordinates retake their human forms and apologize for failing to catch Sagittarius and revealing themselves to teh Hero's Party. Sei bravely approaches Lufas, who can tell that he's from another world. Upon seeing that Virgo serves Lufas, Sei asks Lufas to accompany him and she agrees after some persuasion from Dina, who undoes the memory alternations that she placed on Hawk's Eye earlier. Grantz also recognizes Lufas given how she took down Aries before. Lufas and Sei's group go to help Virgo and Aries fight Mercurius and they eventually defeat him. Orm learns of Mercurius's death and Dina reveals to him that the devilfolks are all just puppets to Alovenus. Luna and Terra also learn of Mercurius's death and are devastated.
20	8	""Monsters" Appeared!"	TBA	TBA	TBA	November 21, 2026
After returning the elixir, they are given a big reward, which Lufas isn't interested in. Sei is nearly being made to marry the princess of Draupnir. Petto reveals that they need the elixir to heal a guardian dragon, so the Hero's Party follow him into the forest. Virgo is relaxed in the forest as she spent most of her life living in one, even though the heaven winged are not fond of forests. Kross tells Sei more about Lufas's background and Virgo's connection to her, leaving Sei wondering who Virgo's parents are. The group find the guardian dragon badly wounded, having been murdered by a group of four monsters who serve Leon. They seek to help Leon in his war against humanity; Kross tells Sei about Leon. The group fight the monsters, but they prove to be very powerful, leading most heroes to get seriously injured. Virgo is powerful enough to fight back. Castor arrives to help them. Despite his injures from having his ship destroyed by Orm, he quickly defeats the monsters, forcing them to retreat. After healing most members, Virgo cannot heal the dragon and the elixir is ineffective as it only works on those who are alive; the dragon is already dead. The group is left devastated. After deducting that Virgo serves Lufas, Castor pulls out another elixir called Amrita, which is powerful enough to revive the dead, using it to heal and revive the dragon, to Petto's happiness. After Castor introduces himself, he meets the rest of Lufas's group and joins them. Castor reveals that Orm stole the Key to Reach the Heavens from him and the group learn of Sagittarius's allegiance to Leon. Suspicious of the situation, they decide to look for Leon and Sagittarius. Dina reveals that they are in Tyrving, a city where demihumans live, but it is dangerous as it is near the devilfolks' lands. The Hero's Party decide to join them; because some members of their group are too injured to continue, Petto will take over for them. Lufas learns more about the Key from Dina. Lufas also makes another RV named Suzuki for Castor, Virgo, and the Hero's Party to ride in. Lufas's group also reveal that Benetnasch's domain Mjolnir is near Tyrving, but Benetnasch is different from the other heroes and she seeks to kill Lufas when they meet.
21	9	"The Vampire Princess, Benetnasch Appeared!"	TBA	TBA	TBA	November 28, 2026
Lufas's group resume their journey to Tyrving and Lufas learns that Orm didn't face Benetnasch her strength matches his. At this point, Benetnasch arrives, eager to fight Lufas after recalling the fight that they had years ago, revealing that the other heroes intervened, which put their fight on hold. Benetnasch warns Lufas's minions to not get involved as she is stronger than them and only Lufas can match her strength before she heads back to Mjolnir, so Lufas has her minions head to Tyrving without her while she goes to Mjolnir. Meanwhile, Sei's group are given potions from Castor that turn them into demihumans so they can enter the demihuman village in disguise. Sei has Friedrich and the Vice Captain remain outside the village to keep a lookout. After claiming to be demihumans escaping human threats, the village guards reveal that Sagittarius, revealed to be the village's leader, was forced to ally with Leon after he threatened to destroy his village, but the villagers didn't like the idea, yet they were forced to comply. Derby, an elderly centaur, deducts that the group are not really demihumans, but the group reveal they only wish to help stop the conflict, not wage war against the demihumans. They are then informed that the monsters from before have arrived in the village for inspection. Meanwhile, Lufas's minions reach Leon's castle in Tyrving and proceed to launch an attack. This gets Leon's attention and he damages Tanaka before proceeding to fight them alongside Sagittarius. Leon proves to be a strong oppenent, but Karkinos manages to outwit him, allowing the others to finish him off. However, Alovenus suddenly grants Leon a boost of power. At Mjolnir, Lufas is given a tour around the place by Benetnasch, who reluctantly agrees to serve as a tour guide given that Lufas didn't meet up at Benetnasch's castle yet as she wanted to look around the city first.

== See also ==
- Mercedes and the Waning Moon, another light novel series with the same writer
