= Yuka Nagase =

Japanese singer

Yuka Nagase 長瀬有花
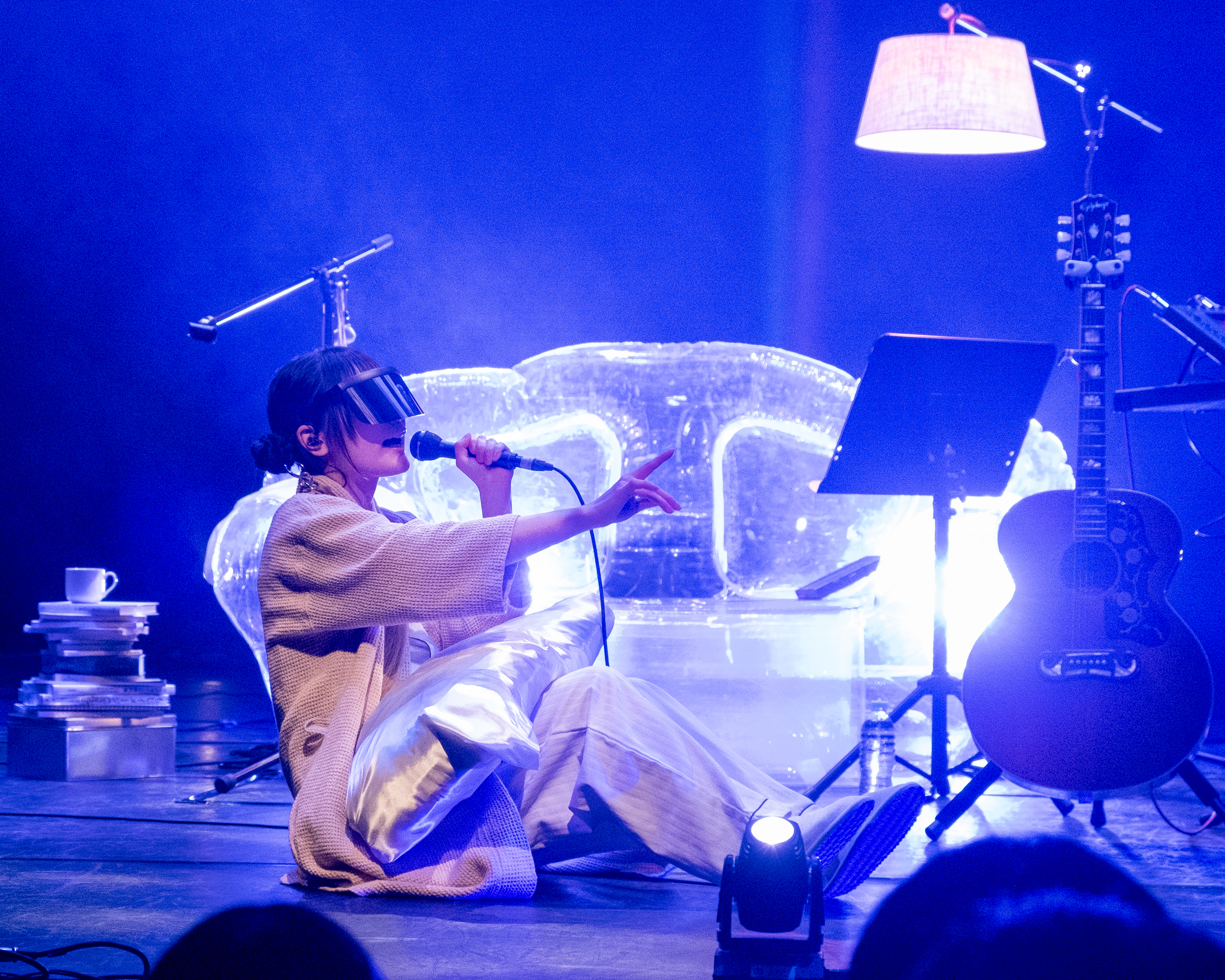
- Nagase in 2026.

Background information
- Genre: J-pop
- Instruments: Vocals, guitar
- Years active: 2020 – present
- Labels: Kigenshou Records (2020–2026); CAMBR (2026 – )

YouTube information
- Channel: 長瀬有花 / YUKA NAGASE
- Years active: 2020 – present
- Subscribers: 148 thousand
- Views: 34.2 million
- Last updated: 16 July 2026

Yuka Nagase (Japanese: 長瀬有花) is a Japanese singer and virtual YouTuber. She is known for her song "Melting Philosophy" (とろける哲学, Torokeru tetsugaku), which went viral on TikTok in 2022. She made her debut in 2020, and released her first album a look afront in 2022. She was named in Rolling Stone Japan's 2024 Future of Music list. In April 2026, she left Kigenshou Records following the closure of the label and joined CAMBR.

== Career ==
Her YouTube channel was created on 9 September 2020, and she debuted on 16 September.

In February 2022, she released her first album a look front. She held her first birthday online concert titled "Alook" two days later. Later in June, she held a live-streaming event titled "SEEK" in which she performed in person for the entirety of the event, contrary to previous events where she would perform both in-person and with her virtual appearance. In August 2022, she released the single "Feverish smoke / You in light blue" (微熱煙 / みずいろのきみ, Binetsu en / Mizuiro no Kimi). Her song "Melting Philosophy" (とろける哲学, Torokeru tetsugaku) went viral on TikTok, and reached 14th on Billboard Japan's TikTok Weekly Top 20 chart. In November, she performed at Anime Festival Asia Singapore 2022.

From January to June 2023, Nagase released one single each month, beginning with "Daylight Evacuation" (白昼避行, Hakuchuu hikou) and ending with "Only my thoughts" (ほんの感想, Honno kansou). In July, Nagase held an online concert in a public bathhouse to commemorate the release of her and LocalVision's album OACL. She held her first in-person live concert with an audience, "Eureka" in August 2023. Nagase released the lead single "Near, far" (近くて、遠くて, Chikakute, tookukute) a week before the release of her second album Launchvox in late September.

In January 2024, she performed at the DOUBLE: concert, and in the META=KNOT music festival in April. She released her first remix album in January, titled YUKARIUM. Nagase held her second live concert "Discharge" in March. She was also named in Rolling Stone Japan's 2024 Future of Music list. She released her first EP with SASAKRECT, titled Kitto Patto in May 2024. Nagase announced in September that she would be recording a collaboration project with mekakushe. They released three singles, held a live concert in which mekakushe appeared as a guest singer in October 2024, and released an EP titled Because the world is beautiful (世界が美しいからだよ, Sekai ga utsukushii kara dayo) in January 2025. They later held a live show together in February 2025. In July 2024, Nagase and Bearwear released the lead single "Basilisk" from their EP ever_changing, which was later released at the end of the month. In August, she held a concert with Such. She also performed at FRICTION in November.

In March 2025, she released a song with DÉ DÉ MOUSE titled "Sugao no mama de Shy Girl". Nagase released two songs as singles, "hikari" and "Listening to thoughts that are far away" (遠くはなれる思考の聞きとり, Tooku wa nareru shokou no kikitori), which would later be included in her third album Mofu Mohu which was released in May 2025. It was later announced that "hikari" would be used for the June ending theme of musicる TV. In August 2025, it was announced that the song "Migi Hidari" (ミギヒダリ, Right, left) by Nagase would be the ending theme for the anime adaptation of light novel series A Wild Last Boss Appeared! She performed at "GRAYSCALE" party in Osaka in September.

In January 2026, Nagase performed in Tokyo, Nagoya and Osaka as part of her tour "YUKA NAGASE BGM TOUR '26". She also performed at the first event of "tie in reaction DX" touring festival in Shinjuku. In March, Nagase and DÉ DÉ MOUSE released a second single together titled "Just a little witch" (ちょっとだけ魔女, Chotto dake majo). In April, she left Kigenshou Records following the closure of the label and joined CAMBR. In May, she performed at NIGHT HIKE music festival as well as Forest, Road, Market music festival. In August, she released a song with AMNC titled "Goodnight Healer" which was used in the game Platonica Space. She also was an act in YouTube Music Weekend 12.0. In November, Nagase and DÉ DÉ MOUSE released a third single together titled "フラれて旅立つぼく達は_pancake crusades". She released a song titled "Next, Weather Report" (お次は天気予報, Otsugi wa Tenki Yohou). She also announced that she would be releasing an album titled Almost a prayer (ほとんど祈り, Hotondo Inori) in December.

== Artistry ==
=== Influences ===
Nagase has cited Etsuko Yakushimaru, Hiroko Taniyama, and Urbangarde as influences on her music. She grew up listening to what her mother listened to, including classical music. She also listened to CDs borrowed from her aunt who liked hit songs. She also listened to Vocaloid music and anime songs. Nagase originally wanted to be a singer, but changed her mind after cancellations of live performances due to the COVID-19 pandemic. She later found an audition held by Riot Music for virtual artists, auditioned for the role and was signed to Kigenshou Records. When asked about her perspective on VTubers in 2024 compared to her debut in 2020, Nagase said, "For me, it's been consistent and hasn't changed much, it's one way of expressing myself doing what I want to do. I see virtual visuals as a body to do things I can't do in the real world."

In an interview with Mikiki, Nagase stated that she wanted to sing songs which others could not imitate. Nagase said that she wrote "The key in the notebook" (ノートには鍵, Note ni wa Kagi) about how she had not listened to music during the production of Mofu Mohu, and whether that had an impact on her music. She based the chord progression on Radiohead's "Creep". In describing the recording of "hikari", Nagase said, "Initially, I intended to sing with more emotion and nuance, however I was told to 'be more blank' and to 'sing as if you're half-asleep.' When I sang as unconsciously as possible, I think that it became more ambiguous, and the scene imagined by each listener changes."

=== Musical style ===
Nagase's music has been described as laid-back. She performs either in person or with her virtual appearance, and has performed as both at the same time.

== Discography ==
=== Studio albums ===
Title	Details
a look front	Release date: 17 February 2022; Label: Kigenshou Records; Track listing: 1. "fake news" 2. "Run, stop" (駆ける、止まる); 3. "Melting philosophy" (とろける哲学); 4. "Hide and Dance" (ハイド・アンド・ダンス); 5. "Laika" (ライカ); 6. "Isekai wear" (異世界うぇあ); 7. "Orange scale" (オレンジスケール); 8. "Run, stop (2)" (駆ける、止まる (2))
Launchvox	Release date: 27 September 2023; Label: Kigenshou Records; Track listing: 1. "Near, far" (近くて、遠くて); 2. "Planetarinea" (プラネタリネア); 3. "Blank room in a dream" (ブランクルームは夢の中); 4. "After you" (アフターユ); 5. "Desert water" (砂漠の水); 6. "Only my thoughts" (ほんの感想); 7. "Spacewalk" (宇宙遊泳)
Mofu Mohu	Release date: 23 May 2025; Label: Kigenshou Records; Track listing: 1. "Today's Music (Instrumental)"; 2. "Skeleton" (スケルトン); 3. "We are Sputnik" (われらスプートニク); 4. "The Listening Room (Instrumental)"; 5. "Wonderful VHS" (ワンダフル・VHS); 6. "The key in the notebook" (ノートには鍵); 7. "hikari" 8. "Poisson Soluble (Instrumental)"; 9. "Listening to thoughts that are far away" (遠くはなれる思考の聞きとり)

=== EPs ===
Title	Details
Kitto Patto	Release date: 31 May 2024; Label: Kigenshou Records / SASAKRECT Inc.; Track listing: 1. "Ex (feat. cat biscuit)" 2. "Moratorium disco (feat. OHTORA & maeshima soshi)" (モラトリアムディスコ(feat. OHTORA & maeshima soshi)); 3. "My falling down (feat. Enyasan)" (僕のフォーリングダウン (feat. エンヤサン)); 4. "stay with me (feat. New K)"; 5. "Kanatzuchi (feat. pige)" (カナヅチ (feat. pige))
ever_changing	Release date: 31 July 2024; Label: ZAYA RECORS; Track listing: 1. "Basilisk"; 2. "Find Out"; 3. "Glider (ever_changing)"
Because the world is beautiful (世界が美しいからだよ)	Release date: 22 January 2025; Track listing: 1. "One different morning" (ひとつだけちがう朝); 2. "Lonely planet" (さみしい惑星); 3. "Around the time the sunset arrives" (夕焼けが届く頃); 4. "Cleaning blue" (クリーニング・ブルー); 5. "It's hard to see because of the backlight" (逆光でよく見えない); 6. "The Earth was once white" (かつて地球は白かった); 7. "The most intense sunrise" (最高密度の朝焼け)

=== Collaborative albums ===
Title	Details
RIOT OF EMOTIONS	Release date: 29 September 2021; Label: RIOT MUSIC; Track listing: 1. "One for Everything"; 2. "Statice" (スターチス); 3. "Feeling"; 4. "Popular romance" (大衆性ロマン); 5. "That's unfair, isn't it?" (ずるいよね); 6. "Air"; 7. "One for Everything (Cocoa Doumyouji Ver.)" (One for Everything (道明寺ここあ Ver.)); 8. "One for Everything (Saki Ashizawa Ver.)" (One for Everything (芦澤サキ Ver.)); 9. "One for Everything (Iori Matsunaga Ver.)" (One for Everything (松永依織 Ver.)); 10. "One for Everything (Yuka Nagase Ver.)" (One for Everything (長瀬有花 Ver.)); 11. "One for Everything (Ryouna Nagahara Ver.)" (One for Everything (凪原涼菜 Ver.))
Re:Volt	Release date: 14 June 2023; Label: RIOT MUSIC; Track listing: 1. "Horizon"; 2. "Full throttle!!!!!!" (フルスロットル!!!!!!); 3. "I Promise You"; 4. "The shaped place" (かたどられたばしょ); 5. "Okeanos"; 6. "Apricot blossom magic" (アプリコットブロッサムマジック); 7. "2 O'clock"; 8. "Eternal place" (永遠の場所); 9. "PRELUDE"; 10. "St. Elmo's fire" (セントエルモの火); 11. "In the dawn light" 12. "We Are Here"
OACL	Release date: 14 July 2023; Label: Local Visions & Kigenshou Records; Track listing: 1. "Time Capsule"; 2. "Be careful!" (気をつけて!); 3. "Sleeper's Store"; 4. "Sakurarira" (さくらりら); 5. "Interlude melts in water" (インタールードは水に溶けて); 6. "Dream-coloured swaying" (夢色ゆらゆら); 7. "Horizon" (ホライゾン)

=== Remix albums ===
Title	Details
YUKARIUM	Release date: 11 January 2024; Track listing: 1. "Yagate Classic (DJ WILDPARTY Remix)" (やがてクラシック (DJ WILDPARTY Remix)); 2. "Blank room in a dream (Sayohimebou Remix)" (ブランクルームは夢の中 (さよひめぼう Remix)); 3. "Run, stop (Shoubun Remix)" (駆ける、止まる (Shoubun Remix)); 4. "Planetarinea (Kigensho Remix)" (プラネタリネア (Kigensho Remix)); 5. "Isekai wear (ueil Remix)" (異世界うぇあ (ueil Remix)); 6. "Feverish smoke (MON/KU Remix)" (微熱煙 (MON/KU Remix)); 7. "Desert water (Furokuro Remix)" (砂漠の水 (フロクロ Remix))

=== Singles ===
Title	Year	Album
"Feverish smoke / You in light blue"	2022	Non-album single
"I don't want to say bye-bye to today yet"	2022	Non-album single
"Daylight evacuation"	2023	Non-album single
"Yagate classic"	2023	Non-album single
"Artificial identity"	2023	Non-album single
"Planetarinea"	2023	Launchvox
"After you"	2023	Launchvox
"Only my thoughts"	2023	Launchvox
"Near, far"	2023	Launchvox
"Lonely planet"	2024	Because the world is beautiful
"Cleaning blue"	2024	Because the world is beautiful
"The Earth was once white"	2024	Because the world is beautiful
"Basilisk"	2025	ever_changing
"Sugao no mama de Shy Girl"	2025	Non-album single
"hikari"	2025	Mofu Mohu
"Listening to thoughts that are far away"	2025	Mofu Mohu
"Right, left"	2025	Non-album single
"Just a little witch"	2026	Non-album single
"Goodnight Healer"	2026	Non-album single
"Next, Weather Report"	2026	Almost a prayer
