= Yuri Usui =

Japanese voice actress and singer

- 薄井 友里
- Born: 15 May
- Occupations: Voice actress; singer
- Years active: 2018–present
- Employer: I'm Enterprise
- Notable work: Gakuen Idolmaster as Rinami Himesaki; A Wild Last Boss Appeared! as Dina

Yuri Usui (Japanese: 薄井 友里, Hepburn: Usui Yuri; born 15 May) is a Japanese voice actress and singer from Tokyo, affiliated with I'm Enterprise. She has starred as Rinami Himesaki in Gakuen Idolmaster and Dina in A Wild Last Boss Appeared!.

== Biography ==
Yuri Usui, a native of Tokyo, was born on 15 May. Already interested in anime, she became interested in voice acting after watching a series recommended by a friend of hers; she was particularly drawn to Rumi Okubo voicing two lead characters in different anime with different personalities. In a 2026 Seiyū Grand Prix interview, she recalled that she was "a complete amateur" without any drama club experience.

Usui joined I'm Enterprise on 1 April 2018, during her first year of training at the Japan Narration Acting Institute. That same year, she made her voice acting debut playing Sanada-honjō and Arioka-jō in Shirohime Quest. Concurrent with her first few years at the agency, she continued her training at the Japan Narration Acting Institute due to agency policy, reaching a total of six years, including voluntary classes.

In March 2024, it was announced Usui would star as Rinami Himesaki, a major character of Gakuen Idolmaster, a spinoff of The Idolmaster franchise. She had become a fan of the franchise while she was a student, being drawn to the technology behind the dancing idol scenes and the character Makoto Kikuchi, and following several auditions for Idolmaster characters, tried out for the role after seeing her "younger big sister/onee-san figure" nature despite her lack of experience with "big sister"/onee-san roles in general. Her Idolmaster single, "Clumsy Trick", charted at #29 at the Oricon Digital Singles Chart and #36 at the Billboard Japan Download Songs Chart. She credited Rinami as a "comrade-in-arms" who helped broaden her own acting range. In May 2026, she appeared with Hololive VTuber La+ Darknesss at the latter's Lap-sama Daikaihō 2026 birthday concert, reprising her role as Rinami.

In 2025, Usui starred as Dina in the A Wild Last Boss Appeared! anime. She had initially expected the character to be "a classic, straightforward heroine" based on the design, but found her very comedic and used a liberal voice range.

Usui is an avid player of Minecraft and Street Fighter 6. She also holds a nutritionist license.

== Filmography ==
=== Television animation ===
Year	Title	Role	Ref
2024	2.5 Dimensional Seduction	High School Student	
2025	A Wild Last Boss Appeared!	Dina	

=== Video games ===
Year	Title	Role	Ref
2021	Cookie Run: Kingdom	Pom-Pom Dough Cookie	
2022	Echocalypse: Scarlet Covenant	Raven	
2024	Gakuen Idolmaster	Rinami Himesaki	
2026	100% Orange Juice	Rinse	

== Discography ==
Title	Year	Peak chart positions		Album
Title	Year	JPN Dig.	JPN DL	Album
"Clumsy Trick"	2024	29	36	Non-album single
"—" denotes releases that did not chart or were not released in that region.
