= The Visitor (2015 film) =

- Misafir
- Directed by: Mehmet Eryılmaz
- Written by: Mehmet Eryılmaz
- Produced by: Mehmet Eryılmaz; Ali Bayraktar; Mustafa Dok
- Starring: Zümrüt Erkin; Tamer Levent; Ayten Uncuoğlu; Hale Akınlı; Ersin Umut Güler; Melek Çınar; Fatih Al; Sema Moritz; Ümit Çırak; Figen Yalçınkaya; Mesut Coşkun; Aziz Albeniz; Emre Çağrı Akbaba
- Cinematography: Cemil Kızıldağ
- Edited by: Mehmet Eryılmaz; Uğur Hamidoğulları; Sultan İlhan; Taner Sarf
- Music by: Sema Moritz
- Production company: Atlanta Film
- Release date: 1 September 2015 (Montreal)
- Running time: 127 minutes
- Country: Turkey
- Language: Turkish

The Visitor, directed by Mehmet Eryilmaz, is 2015 Turkish film. The Visitor is the second feature film of Mehmet Eryilmaz has produced “A Fairground Attraction” as well as some other dramatic documentaries. The Visitor analyses the universal mother-daughter issue, with death theme and covers the sexual harassment within the family as the sub story. With the hope which drives from tragedy, this film tells the story of misfits as the first film of the director.

The leading actors are Zümrüt Erkin, Tamer Levent, Ayten Uncuoğlu, Hale Akınlı, Ersin Umut Güler and young actress Melek Çınar. Sema Moritz with her songs and Fatih Al from the previous film, now Nur’s lover, acting fairground guy Cemal again is acting ‘Cemal’ in the Visitor.

== Plot ==
Ten years after being thrown out of her parental home, Nur hears that her mother is at death’s door. Taking her young daughter with her, Nur hurries back to her father’s world to see, and reconcile with her mother before it is too late. While the universal theme of mother-daughter relationships lies at the centre of the film, this is underpinned by an allusive subtext of incest, one of the most common but least addressed social problems in Turkey. The individual stories of the family members combine with a sense of hope fuelled by tragedy to paint a portrait of the socially disconnected.

== Cast ==
- Zümrüt Erkin
- Tamer Levent
- Ayten Uncuoğlu
- Hale Akınlı
- Ersin Umut Güler
- Melek Çınar
- Fatih Al
- Sema Moritz
- Ümit Çırak
- Figen Yalçınkaya
- Mesut Coşkun
- Aziz Albeniz
- Emre Çağrı Akbaba

== Production ==
Atlanta Film

== Reception ==
Review from The Hollywood Reporter.

=== Awards ===
- 2015 International Montreal World Film Festival FIPRESCI Award - WON
- 2015 International Montreal World Film Festival Grand Jury Prize - WON
- 2015 International Haifa Film Festival Main Competition - NOMINATED
