= Gate (novel series) =

Japanese fantasy novel series and its adaptations

- Gate: Jieitai Kano Chi nite, Kaku Tatakaeri
- Cover of the first volume, featuring (from left to right): Rory Mercury, Yōji Itami, Tuka Luna Marceau, and Lelei La Lelena

ゲート 自衛隊 彼の地にて、斯く戦えり (Gēto Jieitai Kano Chi nite, Kaku Tatakaeri)
- Genre: Fantasy, isekai
- Novel series
- Written by: Takumi Yanai
- Published by: Arcadia
- Original run: April 2006 – June 2009
- Volumes: 10 (5 main story, 5 side story)
- Light novel
- Written by: Takumi Yanai
- Illustrated by: Daisuke Izuka; Kurojishi
- Published by: AlphaPolis
- Original run: April 12, 2010 – July 3, 2015
- Volumes: 10 (original); 20 (bunkobon)
- Manga
- Written by: Takumi Yanai
- Illustrated by: Satoru Sao
- Published by: AlphaPolis
- English publisher: NA: Sekai Project (canceled); Alpha Manga
- Original run: July 30, 2011 – present
- Volumes: 28
- Anime television series
- Directed by: Takahiko Kyōgoku; Ryō Andō (Note: Chief Unit Director (チーフ演出))
- Produced by: Nobuhiro Nakayama; Teppei Ōta; Nobuhiro Osawa
- Written by: Tatsuhiko Urahata
- Music by: Yoshiaki Fujisawa
- Studio: A-1 Pictures
- Licensed by: AUS: Madman Entertainment; NA: Sentai Filmworks; UK: MVM Films (former); Anime Limited (current)
- Original network: Tokyo MX, TVA, MBS, BS11, AT-X
- Original run: July 4, 2015 – March 26, 2016
- Episodes: 24
- Novel series

Gate Season 2: Jieitai Kano Umi nite, Kaku Tatakaeri
- Written by: Takumi Yanai
- Published by: AlphaPolis
- Original run: July 21, 2017 – present
- Volumes: 5
- Light novel

Gate Season 2: Jieitai Kano Umi nite, Kaku Tatakaeri
- Written by: Takumi Yanai
- Illustrated by: Daisuke Izuka
- Published by: AlphaPolis
- Original run: August 8, 2017 – present
- Volumes: 20 (bunkobon)
- Novel series

Gate 0: Jieitai Ginza nite, Kaku Tatakaeri
- Written by: Takumi Yanai
- Published by: AlphaPolis
- Original run: December 31, 2021 – August 31, 2022
- Volumes: 2
- Manga

Gate 0: Jieitai Ginza nite, Kaku Tatakaeri
- Written by: Takumi Yanai
- Illustrated by: Ryuichi Saitaniya
- Published by: AlphaPolis
- Original run: March 13, 2024 – present
- Volumes: 4
- Manga

Gate Season 2: Jieitai Kano Umi nite, Kaku Tatakaeri
- Written by: Takumi Yanai
- Illustrated by: Satoru Sao
- Published by: AlphaPolis
- Original run: February 27, 2026 – present
- Volumes: 1
- Anime television series

Gate Season 2: Jieitai Kano Umi nite, Kaku Tatakaeri
- Directed by: Tōru Takahashi
- Written by: Tatsuhiko Urahata
- Music by: Yoshiaki Fujisawa
- Studio: Studio M2
- Original run: 2027 – scheduled
- Other manga
- Gate! Yonkoma; Gate: Teikoku no Bara Kishidan - Piña Co Lada 14-sai; Gate: featuring The Starry Heavens; Mei☆Company
- icon

Gate (Japanese: ゲート 自衛隊 彼の地にて、斯く戦えり, Hepburn: Gēto: Jieitai Kano Chi nite, Kaku Tatakaeri; lit. Gate: Thus the Japanese Self-Defense Force Fought in Their Land), is a Japanese fantasy novel series written by Takumi Yanai and illustrated by Daisuke Izuka and Kurojishi.

Originally, it was serialized from 2006 to 2009 on the user-generated novel publishing website Arcadia until it was acquired by publisher AlphaPolis in 2010. A manga adaptation illustrated by Satoru Sao began in July 2011, and three spin-off manga began in 2015. The first half of an anime television series adaptation aired from July to September 2015, and the second half aired from January to March 2016. The series has been licensed by Sentai Filmworks in North America.

A sequel novel series, Gate Season 2: Jieitai Kano Umi nite, Kaku Tatakaeri, began publication in 2017. An anime television series adaptation of the sequel animated by Studio M2 is set to premiere in 2027.

== Plot ==
In modern-day Ginza, Tokyo, a portal from another world suddenly appears and a legion of Roman-styled medieval soldiers and monsters emerge to attack the city. Using modern weaponry and tactics, the Japan Self-Defense Forces easily repels the enemy and passes through the Gate to establish a forward operating base and initiate peace negotiations with the Empire of the other world. However, Japan's exclusive access to the Gate is envied by the other nations of the world, who wish to exploit the 特地 (Tokuchi, "Special Region"; Japan's designation for the other world) for their own purposes. Also, the JSDF's activities are closely monitored by their government, which hesitates to involve itself any further into the Special Region's affairs out of fear of public disapproval.

Yōji Itami is a reserve JSDF officer sent to investigate the other world, where magic, dragons and elves are real, using his knowledge of fantasy stories to make his way in this new environment. While exploring the Special Region, he ends up selflessly aiding its people—including Imperial Princess Piña Co Lada—against an ancient dragon and a band of marauders, thus paving the way for negotiations and saddling himself with a group of local girls who have developed feelings for him. However, when he humiliates Imperial Crown Prince Zorzal in order to rescue a Japanese prisoner from his clutches, the latter decides to make Japan pay in blood, seizing power as a dictator and preparing for an all-out war. Thus the JSDF is eventually forced to engage in aggressive combat action to maintain the status quo and bring negotiations with Zorzal's father, Molt Sol Augustus, to a peaceful conclusion.

Following the JSDF's liberation of Princess Piña, the Emperor and the anti-war senators from the Imperial capital, Zorzal goes into hiding and engages in a guerilla war, having his men, wearing imitation camouflage uniforms, and monsters commit terror acts against the civilian population in order to discredit the Japanese and draw them out; but the JSDF's allies and sympathizers rally to their side to defeat the rogue prince. However, as the goddess Hardy relates to Itami, the Gate itself poses another serious problem. Initially opened by Hardy, but enlarged and stabilized by the Empire's magicians, it begins to cause a series of cataclysmic disruptions as the Special Region and Earth begin to drift away from this mutual anchor point. Thus, the Japanese must struggle to both end the civil war and close the Gate in time before both worlds rip each other to pieces.

== Media ==
=== Novels ===
==== Season 1 ====
Takumi Yanai, a former member of the JSDF, initially published the work on the user-generated content site Arcadia from April 2006 until June 2009 under the pseudonym Todoku Takusan (とどく = たくさん). In 2010, AlphaPolis made an arrangement with him to publish his work in print. The first two web novel volumes were slightly altered to make them less nationalistic whereas the third, and final, web novel volume was rewritten and expanded into three volumes. These five volumes were published from April 12, 2010, to January 5, 2012, with cover illustrations by Daisuke Izuka. The original web novels were later removed from Arcadia. The series has continued with five volumes of side stories (Gate Gaiden) as of October 10, 2012.

On January 6, 2013, AlphaPolis began a reprint of the series as a light novel, where each novel volume was split into two small-sized light novel volumes in bunkobon format, as well as new cover and inside illustrations by Kurojishi. On March 25, 2026, Hanashi Media started publishing the novel series in English, in the light novel format.

No.	Title	Original release date	English release date
1	Contact Arc; Sesshoku Hen (接触編)	April 12, 2010; 978-4-43414-235-2	Part 1: March 25, 2026; Part 2: June 30, 2026; 978-1-96178-856-5
2	Fire Dragon Arc; Honou Ryuu Hen (炎龍編)	August 8, 2010; 978-4-43414-763-0	Part 1: September 30, 2026; Part 2: December 30, 2026; 978-1-96178-881-7
3	— Douran Hen (動乱編)	December 24, 2010; 978-4-43415-254-2	—
4	— Sou Ji Hen (総撃編)	June 30, 2011; 978-4-43415-720-2	—
5	— Meimon Hen (冥門編)	January 5, 2012; 978-4-43416-238-1	—

A supplementary prequel novel titled Gate: Zero (Japanese: ゲート 0 -zero- 自衛隊 銀座にて、斯く戦えり, Hepburn: Gēto Zero: Jieitai Ginza nite, Kaku Tatakaeri; lit. Gate 0: Thus the Japanese Self-Defense Force Fought at Ginza), which details the events surrounding the Ginza Incident, was published in two volumes between December 31, 2021, and August 31, 2022.

No.	Japanese release date	Japanese ISBN
1	December 31, 2021	978-4-43429-725-0
2	August 31, 2022	978-4-43430-751-5

==== Season 2 ====
A sequel novel series, Gate Season 2 (Japanese: ゲートSeason2 自衛隊 彼の海にて、斯く戦えり, Hepburn: Gate Season 2: Jieitai Kano Umi nite, Kaku Tatakaeri; lit. Gate Season 2: Thus the Japanese Self-Defense Force Fought in Their Sea), centers on a new set of characters from the Maritime Self-Defense Force. In season two, the JMSDF's Goro Etajima and his subordinate Koji Tokushima's travel around designated countries with research and exploration duties. With the reopening of the gate, the Japanese government continues to maintain control of the "gate" monopoly in the international community. This requires the government to focus on both domestic politics as well as terrain investigations in the new world as modest relationships are formed with local residents.

Daisuke Izuka returns as the illustrator for the novels. Five volumes have been published with the first volume released on August 8, 2017, and the fifth volume released on November 30, 2020.

No.	Japanese release date	Japanese ISBN
1	August 8, 2017	978-4-434-23616-7
2	May 5, 2018	978-4-434-24575-6
3	January 31, 2019	978-4-434-25598-4
4	December 3, 2019	978-4-434-26791-8
5	November 30, 2020	978-4-434-28126-6

=== Manga ===
There are seven manga series based on Gate, all published by AlphaPolis. The first manga, drawn by Satoru Sao, began publishing on July 30, 2011. This manga is licensed in English by Sekai Publishing, but only the first two volumes have been translated, with Sekai stating quality problems with the volume 2 copies in 2018. Following the release of volume 2 in 2020, Sekai Project canceled subsequent volumes. On July 8, 2021, AlphaPolis announced they would publish the series in English on their Alpha Manga Service; the publication of the first three volumes occurred two years later.

The second manga, titled Gate! Yonkoma, is a yonkoma comic strip comedy drawn by Kuinji 51-gou, began on January 15, 2015, and ended on July 23, 2015. The third manga, drawn by Yukie Shiren and titled Gate: Teikoku no Bara Kishidan - Piña Co Lada 14-sai, which is a prequel story with Piña as the main protagonist, began on March 19, 2015, and ended on April 7, 2016, has 2 volumes. A fourth manga, drawn by Chako Abeno and titled Gate: featuring The Starry Heavens, which depicts the three main female characters becoming music idols, began on March 19, 2015, and ended on April 28, 2016, has 2 volumes. A fifth spin-off manga, drawn by Tomo and titled Mei☆Company, is based on the in-universe manga in the Gate series, began on March 19, 2015, and ended on October 22, 2015, has 1 volume.

A sixth manga series based on Gate: Zero, illustrated by Ryuichi Saitaniya, began serialization online on March 13, 2024.. A seventh manga series based on Gate Season 2, illustrated by Satoru Sakano, began serialization online on February 27, 2026.

No.	Original release date	Original ISBN	English release date	English ISBN
1	June 15, 2012	978-4-434-16703-4	May 2016 (SP); July 28, 2023 (AP)	978-0-997-61860-0 (SP)
2	January 25, 2013	978-4-434-17468-1	December 2020 (SP); July 28, 2023 (AP)	978-0-997-61862-4 (SP)
3	July 18, 2013	978-4-434-18048-4	July 28, 2023	—
4	April 20, 2014	978-4-434-19017-9	August 25, 2023	—
5	September 22, 2014	978-4-434-19601-0	August 25, 2023	—
6	March 30, 2015	978-4-434-20299-5	August 25, 2023	—
7	June 23, 2015	978-4-434-20675-7	November 30, 2023	—
8	December 1, 2015	978-4-434-21300-7	November 30, 2023	—
9	June 1, 2016	978-4-434-21993-1	November 30, 2023	—
10	December 1, 2016	978-4-434-22649-6	March 29, 2024	—
11	April 1, 2017	978-4-434-23144-5	March 29, 2024	—
12	December 1, 2017	978-4-434-23969-4	March 29, 2024	—
13	June 1, 2018	978-4-434-246760	July 26, 2024	—
14	December 30, 2018	978-4-434-253683	July 26, 2024	—
15	June 30, 2019	978-4-434-260315	July 26, 2024	—
16	December 30, 2019	978-4-434-267765	November 29, 2024	—
17	June 30, 2020	978-4-434-27533-3	November 29, 2024	—
18	December 30, 2020	978-4-434-28254-6	November 29, 2024	—
19	June 30, 2021	978-4-434-29010-7	February 21, 2025	—
20	December 30, 2021	978-4-434-29735-9	April 25, 2025	—
21	June 30, 2022	978-4-434-30460-6	April 25, 2025	—
22	December 30, 2022	978-4-434-31352-3	August 29, 2025	—
23	June 30, 2023	978-4-434-32196-2	August 29, 2025	—
24	December 30, 2023	978-4-434-33117-6	December 26, 2025	—
25	June 30, 2024	978-4-434-34052-9	July 24, 2026	—
26	December 30, 2024	978-4-434-35001-6	—	—
27	August 30, 2025	978-4-434-35001-6	—	—
28	November 30, 2025	978-4-434-36805-9	—	—

=== Anime ===
An anime television series adaptation was produced by A-1 Pictures and directed by Takahiko Kyōgoku. The series' character designs are based on the light novel illustrations. The first 12 episodes aired in Japan between July 4 and September 18, 2015. The second half aired on Tokyo MX from January 9 to March 26, 2016. It was streamed online by Crunchyroll and is licensed by Sentai Filmworks in North America. From episode 1 to 12, the opening theme song is "Gate (Sore wa Akatsuki no You ni)" (GATE～それは暁のように～) by Kishida Kyoudan & The Akeboshi Rockets and the ending theme song is "Prism Communicate" (ぷりずむコミュニケート, Purizumu Komyunikēto) by Hisako Kanemoto, Nao Tōyama, and Risa Taneda. Sentai Filmworks released a complete collection of the series on Blu-ray and DVD on July 11, 2017. For the second half, the opening theme is "Gate II (Sekai o Koete)" (GATE II ～世界を超えて～) by Kishida Kyoudan & The Akeboshi Rockets, and the ending theme is "Itsudatte Communication" (いつだってコミュニケーション) by Kanemoto, Tōyama, and Taneda. In 2017, scholar Takayoshi Yamamura noted that anime was produced in the collaboration with the JSDF Tokyo Provincial Cooperation Office. He further pointed out that the original author formerly was a JSDF officer and said he proposed the cooperation with the office in the first place. Yamamura also noted in 2015 the JSDF entered their vehicles into a contest in Ōmiya-ku, Saitama, painting them with anime characters.

An anime television series adaptation of the sequel series was announced on July 4, 2025. The series will be produced by Kasagi Labo, Oshi and Genco, animated by Studio M2, and directed by Tōru Takahashi, with Tatsuhiko Urahata returning to handle series composition, Shigeru Fujita designing the characters, and Yoshiaki Fujisawa returning to compose the music. It is set to premiere in 2027.

== Reception ==
In June 2017, it was reported that the novels for season one have sold over 4.2 million copies in Japan. By May 2021, it had sold over 6 million copies.

Rebecca Silverman of Anime News Network reviewed the first twelve episodes of Gate where she praised the anime's unique premise of a modern military fighting against fantasy races in another world, having its main protagonist being an older man rather than a teenager and its unique cast of characters, but also criticized the anime for being too political and glorifying the Japanese military. Theron Martin of Anime News Network also praises the anime for being the opposite of Outbreak Company, another anime with a similar premise about modern Japan discovering a fantasy world. While he found the story and some of the characters entertaining and praised some of the English voice actors, he also criticized how some character stories were much weaker than others, the English script was changed from the original Japanese, and found Gate's political views in the anime were "graceless and heavy-handed". The general positive response to Gate prompted the Japanese military to start a recruitment campaign using the main characters as mascots. A pachislot game based on the anime was released in February 2018.
