= Gate (Sore wa Akatsuki no You ni) =

- CD and DVD artwork.

Single by Kisida Kyoudan & The Akebosi Rockets
- B-side: "Egotistic Hero"
- Released: July 29, 2015
- Recorded: 2015
- Genre: Rock
- Length: 3:47
- Label: Warner Home Video; Warner Bros. Entertainment
- Songwriter: Kisida Kyoudan
- Producers: Kisida Kyoudan & The Akebosi Rockets

Kisida Kyoudan & The Akebosi Rockets singles chronology
"Strike the Blood" (2013)	"Gate (Sore wa Akatsuki no You ni)" (2015)	"Gate II (Sekai o Koete)" (2016)

"Gate (Sore wa Akatsuki no you ni)" (Japanese: GATE (それは暁のように);; "Gate (It Looks Like the Dawn)") is a song recorded by Japanese rock Kisida Kyoudan & The Akebosi Rockets. It was released as the group's first single in two years by Warner Bros. Entertainment and their subsidiary label Warner Home Video on July 29, 2015. The lyrics were written by Kisida and the music and arrangement were created by the band. Musically, "Gate (Sore wa Akatsuki no you ni)" is a rock song that features guitars, drums, and bass guitars in its instrumentation. An alternative version with different lyrics and slightly edited composition was released in January 2016, under the title "Gate II (Sekai wo Koete)".

Upon its release, it received positive reviews from music critics. Some complimented the composition, whilst the rest praised the production and commercial appeal. Commercially, the song was moderately successful in Japan, peaking at number 17 on the Oricon Singles Chart and made it their third consecutive top 20 entry. An accompanying music video featured the band singing in a warehouse, surrounded with construction tape and ornaments. To promote the single, it was used as the opening theme song for the first season of Japanese anime television series, Gate: Jieitai Kanochi nite, Kaku Tatakaeri.

== Background and release ==
On June 13, 2015, it was confirmed through Anime News Network that Japanese group Kisida Kyoudan & The Akebosi Rockets would release a new song titled "Gate (Sore wa Akatsuki no you ni)", and would serve as the opening theme song to the first season of Japanese anime television series, Gate: Jieitai Kanochi nite, Kaku Tatakaeri. The lyrics were written by Kisida and the music and arrangement were created by the band. Musically, it is a rock song that features guitars, drums, and bass guitars in its instrumentation. According to Japanese music magazine CD Journal, they described the rock composition as "loud" and "sharp".

It was released as the group's first single in two years by Warner Bros. Entertainment and their subsidiary label Warner Home Video on July 29, 2015. It was first released on a CD single in Japan, which included the track, a B-side song titled "Egotistic Hero", and both their respective instrumental versions. The second format was the CD and DVD single, which included the same audio track list, but also featured the full music video on the second disc. The final physical format was a special anime CD that included the track, a shortened version dubbed "TV size", and the instrumental. The digital EP included the four recordings, released only in Japan. Each format, apart from the digital release, includes three different artworks with all promotional images taken from the television series. (Note: The three artworks for the regular CD single, the DVD single, and the special Gate Anime CD and DVD were published on CDJapan.com.)

== Reception ==
Upon its release, it received positive reviews from music critics. A staff member at CD Journal was positive, complimenting the songwriting on how it holds a "sharp message" for listeners to understand. The review concluded with the reviewer labeling it "exhilarating". In a similar review, The News Hub's Can Hoang Tran said that "There are times that you may have rewound the anime to the very beginning just to listen to the theme song. I consider myself part of that group of anime let alone Gate fans." He called it one of 2015's "catchy and [energetic]" anime theme songs. Josh Piedra from The Outerhaven enjoyed the song as a "Kyoudan fan", but stated that "The opening song is a catchy one... but it still sounds like your typical mainstream J-Rock with female lead vocals."

Commercially, the song was moderately successful in Japan. It debuted at number 17 on the Oricon Singles Chart, the group's lowest entry at the time. Despite falling outside of the top 50 the following week, it lasted 10 weeks inside the top 200. As of June 2016, "Gate (Sore wa Akatsuki no you ni)" is the group's third best selling single according to Oricon Style. It was success on Japan's Billboard competent charts, peaking at number 15 on the Japan Hot 100 chart, two on the Hot Anime chart, and number 15 on the Hot Single Sales chart.

== Music video and promotion ==
An accompanying music video for the single was released on July 29, 2015, through the official Japanese Warner Bros. channel on YouTube. It opens with a blurred long shot of the band sitting on a couch, and as the music starts, it has them performing in a warehouse surrounded with music gear and ornaments. Intercut shots of vocalist Ichigo surrounded with construction tape appears during the song's verses, whilst Kyoudan is seen performing the guitar during instrumental breaks on a tank. The video ends with a long shot of the group standing in the warehouse.

The singles only promotion in Japan was its inclusion as the opening theme song for the first season of Japanese anime television series, Gate: Jieitai Kanochi nite, Kaku Tatakaeri. An alternative version with different lyrics and slightly edited composition was released in January 2016, under the title "Gate II (Sekai o Koete)"; This version was used for the second season of the series.

== Track listings and formats ==
- CD single
1. "Gate (Sore wa Akatsuki no you ni)" (GATE (それは暁のように);; "Gate (It Looks Like the Dawn)") – 3:47
2. "Egotistic Hero" – 3:34
3. "Gate (Sore wa Akatsuki no you ni)" (GATE (それは暁のように);; "Gate (It Looks Like the Dawn)") (Instrumental) – 3:47
4. "Egotistic Hero" (Instrumental) – 3:34
- DVD single
1. "Gate (Sore wa Akatsuki no you ni)" (GATE (それは暁のように);; "Gate (It Looks Like the Dawn)") – 3:47
2. "Egotistic Hero" – 3:34
3. "Gate (Sore wa Akatsuki no you ni)" (GATE (それは暁のように);; "Gate (It Looks Like the Dawn)") (Instrumental) – 3:47
4. "Egotistic Hero" (Instrumental) – 3:34
5. "Gate (Sore wa Akatsuki no you ni)" (GATE (それは暁のように);; "Gate (It Looks Like the Dawn)") (Music video) – 3:50
- Anime edition
1. "Gate (Sore wa Akatsuki no you ni)" (GATE (それは暁のように);; "Gate (It Looks Like the Dawn)") – 3:47
2. "Gate (Sore wa Akatsuki no you ni)" (GATE (それは暁のように);; "Gate (It Looks Like the Dawn)") (TV size) – 1:30
3. "Gate (Sore wa Akatsuki no you ni)" (GATE (それは暁のように);; "Gate (It Looks Like the Dawn)") (Instrumental) – 3:47
- Digital download
1. "Gate (Sore wa Akatsuki no you ni)" (GATE (それは暁のように);; "Gate (It Looks Like the Dawn)") – 3:47
2. "Egotistic Hero" – 3:34
3. "Gate (Sore wa Akatsuki no you ni)" (GATE (それは暁のように);; "Gate (It Looks Like the Dawn)") (Instrumental) – 3:47
4. "Egotistic Hero" (Instrumental) – 3:34

== Personnel ==
Credits adapted from the CD liner notes of "Gate (Sore wa Akatsuki no you ni)".

Recording and management

- Recorded in 2015. Management and record label Warner Bros. Entertainment and Warner Home Video.

Credits

- Kishida Kyoudan – background vocals, composing, songwriting, producing, arranging
- Ichigo – vocals, background vocals, arranging, producing
- Hayapi – guitar, background vocals, arranging, producing
- Micchan – drums, background vocals, arranging, producing
- T-Tsu – guitar, background vocals, arranging, producing

== Charts ==
=== Weekly charts ===
Chart (2015)	Peak position
Japan Weekly Chart (Oricon)	17
Japan Hot 100 (Billboard)	15
Japan Weekly Anime Chart (Billboard)	2
Japan Weekly Hot Singles Sales Chart (Billboard)	15

=== Rankings chart ===
Chart (2015)	Peak position
Japan Profile (Oricon)	3

== Release history ==
Region	Date	Format	Label
Japan	July 29, 2015	Regular CD	Warner Home Video; Warner Bros. Entertainment
Japan	July 29, 2015	DVD single	Warner Home Video; Warner Bros. Entertainment
Japan	July 29, 2015	Exclusive Gate Anime CD	Warner Home Video; Warner Bros. Entertainment
Japan	July 29, 2015	Digital download	Warner Home Video; Warner Bros. Entertainment
