= Kisida Kyodan & The Akebosi Rockets =

Japanese rock band currently signed to Warner Bros

- Origin: Japan
- Genres: Rock, alternative rock, post-grunge, pop punk
- Years active: 2007, 2008–present
- Labels: Geneon Universal (2010–2011); Warner Bros. Home Entertainment (2013–2020, 2025–present); NBCUniversal Entertainment (2021–present)
- Members: Kisida (bass guitar, guitar, leader); ichigo (vocals); Hayapi (guitar); ~Mitchan (drums)
- Past members: T-tsu (guitar)
- Website: kisidakyoudan.com

Kisida Kyodan
- Origin: Japan
- Genres: Rock, alternative rock, post-grunge, pop punk
- Years active: 2004–2010
- Past members: Kisida (bass guitar, guitar)
- Website: http://k-kyoudan.s61.xrea.com/

Kisida Kyodan & The Akebosi Rockets (Japanese: 岸田教団&THE明星ロケッツ, Hepburn: Kishida Kyōdan Ando Ji Akeboshi Rokettsu) is a Japanese rock band currently signed to NBCUniversal Entertainment Japan. Formed in 2007 by Kisida of one-man dōjin music circle Kisida Kyodan to perform rock arrangements of Touhou Project songs live. In 2010 the band made their major debut with the single "Highschool of the Dead", used as the opening theme of the 2010 anime television series of the same name.

== Overview ==
In 2004 guitarist and bassist Kisida formed one-man dōjin music circle Kisida Kyodan, making rock arrangements of songs from series such as Touhou Project and video games by Type-Moon and Key, as well as original music. The circle's first album was released at Winter Comiket in 2005. In 2007 Kisida was invited to perform at Touhou Project event Flowering Night 2007 and recruited vocalist ichigo, guitarists Hayapi and T-tsu, and drummer Mi-cyan to form Kisida Kyodan & The Akebosi Rockets as a live band. After the live performance and releasing one studio album in May 2007 the band broke up as they had planned from the beginning, before shortly regrouping for Flowering Night 2008.

The band made their major debut in 2010 with the release of the single "Highschool of the Dead" under Geneon Universal (now NBCUniversal Entertainment Japan); the title song is used as the opening theme to the 2010 anime television series Highschool of the Dead. The band released its second single "Strike the Blood" on October 30, 2013, under Warner Bros. Home Entertainment; the title song is used as the first opening theme to the 2013 anime television series Strike the Blood. They released their third single "Gate (Sore wa Akatsuki no You ni)" (GATE〜それは暁のように〜) on July 29, 2015; the title song is used as the opening theme to the 2015 anime television series Gate. They released their fourth single "Gate II (Sekai o Koete)" (GATE II 〜世界を超えて〜) on January 27, 2016; the title song is used as the opening theme to the second season of Gate. They released their fifth single "Tenkyou no Alderamin" on July 20, 2016; the title song is used as the opening theme of the 2016 animated television series Alderamin on the Sky. They released their sixth single "Blood on the EDGE" on December 26, 2016; the title song is used as the opening theme of the 2016 animated OVA series Strike the Blood II. Their seventh single, "Stray," was released on February 7, 2018, and is used as the opening theme for the animated series Hakata Tonkotsu Ramens. Their eighth single, "Sirius," was released on August 22, 2018, and is used as the opening theme for the animated series Sirius the Jaeger. Their ninth single, "nameless story", is the ending theme for A Certain Scientific Railgun T, the third season of the animated series A Certain Scientific Railgun. In October 2021, they released their first best-of album Isekaitensei Shitara Best Album Deshita which included all of their past singles, a reboot version of their major debut single Highschool of the Dead[2021] and some other songs from their Genon Universal Entertainment discography.
In December 2021, they released their first live album Super Pro Max Ti which included 14 songs (live ver.) and a new song called TRIGGER. They released the single "Tensei Shitara Ken Deshita" (転生したら剣でした) on November 30, 2022; the title song is used as the opening theme to the anime series Reincarnated as a Sword.

== Discography ==
=== Singles ===
	Release date	Title	Catalog number			Peak chart position
	Release date	Title	Limited edition	Regular edition	Anime edition	Peak chart position
1st	2010-08-18	Highschool of the Dead		GNCA-0143		10
2nd	2013-10-30	Strike the Blood	1000427828			16
3rd	2015-07-29	Gate (Sore wa Akatsuki no You ni)	1000573377	1000573379	1000573378	17
4th	2016-01-27	Gate II (Sekai o Koete)	1000590451	1000590453	1000590452	23
5th	2016-07-20	Tenkyou no Alderamin		1000611364	1000611363	28
6th	2016-12-21	Blood on the EDGE	1000629350	1000629351		35
7th	2018-02-07	Stray	1000705987	1000705989	1000705988	37
8th	2018-08-22	Sirius	1000723086	1000723088	1000723087	82
9th	2020-01-29	nameless story	1000757475	1000757476		42
10th	2022-11-30	Tensei Shitara Ken Deshita	GNCA-0678	GNCA-0678		—

==== Digital Singles ====
	Release date	Title	Album
1st	2021-08-18	"Highschool of the Dead"	Isekaitensei Shitara Best Album Deshita
2nd	2021-12-01	"TRIGGER"	Super Pro Max Ti
3rd	2024-04-03	"Eight Beat Berserker"	BERSERKERS
4th	2024-05-22	"entertainment punks"	BERSERKERS
5th	2025-10-05	"Level up and physical attack"	Non-album singles
6th	2026-04-10	"Ryuusei"	Non-album singles
7th	2026-10-17	"Meltdowner"	Non-album singles

=== Albums ===
==== Commercial Albums ====
	Release date	Title	Catalog number		Peak chart position
	Release date	Title	Limited edition	Regular edition	Peak chart position
1st	2011-06-22	POPSENSE	GNCA-1303	GNCA-1304	21
2nd	2014-12-24	hack/SLASH	1000536964		36
3rd	2017-03-22	LIVE YOUR LIFE	1000640261	1000640260	23
4th	2018-12-05	REBOOT	1000735130	1000735131	44
5th	2024-06-26	BERSERKERS	GNCA-1651	GNCA-1652	47

==== Compilation Albums ====
	Release date	Title	Catalog number		Peak chart position
	Release date	Title	Limited edition	Regular edition	Peak chart position
1st	2021-10-20	Isekaitensei Shitara Best Album Deshita	GNCA-1602	GNCA-1603	31

==== Live Albums ====
	Release date	Title	Catalog number		Peak chart position
	Release date	Title	Limited edition	Regular edition	Peak chart position
1st	2021-12-22	Super Pro Max Ti	GNCA-1606	GNCA-1607	204
2nd	2024-06-26	LIVE TOUR "KISIDA KYODAN no Gyakushu 2023 ~Mikata ni suruto tayorinaku Teki ni mawasuto uttoushii~"	GNCA-1651	GNCA-1652	–

==== Dōjin CDs ====
	Release date	Title	Catalog number	Release event	Based on	Notes
1st	2007-05-20	Gensou Jihen (幻想事変)	K2-0004	Reitaisai 4	Touhou Project	
2nd	2008-05-25	Electric blue	K2-0006	Reitaisai 5	Touhou Project	
3rd	2009-12-29	LITERAL WORLD	K2-0007	Comiket 75	Original composition	
4th	2010-03-14	ROLLING★STAR	K2-0008	Reitaisai 7	Touhou Project	
5th	2012-04-30	Seventh World (セブンスワールド)	K2-0009	M3-2012 Spring	Original composition	
6th	2012-05-27	.JP	K2-0010	Reitaisai 9	Touhou Project	
7th	2012-12-30	Rock 'n' Roll Laboratory (ロックンロールラボラトリー)	K2-0011	Comiket 83	Touhou Project and original composition	
8th	2013-05-26	surumeika-	K2-0012	Reitaisai 10	Touhou Project	
9th	2013-12-30	Kisida Kyodan no Best (きしだきょうだんのベスト！)	K2-0013	Comiket 85	Touhou Project	Compilation album
10th	2015-12-30	SUPER SONIC APPLE RABBIT	K2-0014	Comiket 89	Touhou Project	
11th	2016-04-24	ROCK'N'ROLL LABORATORY 2	K2-0015	M3-2016 Spring	Touhou Project and original composition	Compilation album
12th	2017-05-07	ANCIENT FLOWER	K2-0016	Reitaisai 14	Touhou Project	
13th	2017-12-29	Seizon CD (生存CD)	K2-0017	Comiket 93	Touhou Project and original composition	Live album
14th	2018-12-30	COMPACT DISC	K2-0018	Comiket 95	Touhou Project	
15th	2019-08-12	MOD	K2-0019	Comiket 96	Touhou Project	
16th	2020-11-14	yukkuri	K2-0020		Touhou Project	
17th	2021-12-24	Black Market (ブラックマーケット)	K2-0021	Comiket 99	Touhou Project	
18th	2022-12-31	Kisida Kyodan Archive (*Wake a tte) Jōkan (岸田教団アーカイブ(※訳あって)上巻)	K2-0022	Comiket 101	Original composition	Compilation album
19th	2023-05-07	Kisida Kyodan Archive (*Wake a tte) Gekan (岸田教団アーカイブ(※訳あって)下巻)	K2-0023	Reitaisai 20	Original composition	Compilation album
20th	2023-08-13	Chōchō Cucumber (超々キューカンバー)	K2-0024	Comiket 102	Touhou Project	
21st	2026-08-16	UNDER	K2-0026	Comiket 108	Touhou Project	

==== Dōjin DVDs ====
	Release date	Title	Catalog number	Release event	Based on
1st	2009-12-30	LITERAL WORLD LIVE TOUR DVD in AKASAKA BLITZ	K2VD-0001	Comiket 77	Touhou Project and original composition
2nd	2011-12-31	POPSENSE LIVE TOUR 2011 FINAL at SHIBUYA AX on NOVEMBER 1	K2VD-0002	Comiket 81	Touhou Project and original composition
3rd	2016-12-31	2016 Live Tour FINAL Hajimete no Osoto at Hibiya Yagai Dai Ongakudou (2016ライブツアー FINAL はじめてのおそと at 日比谷野外大音楽堂)	K2VD-0003	Comiket 91	Touhou Project and original composition
4th	2019-12-31	Kyūsai MOD LIVE TOUR in CLUB CITTA' Live DVD (救済 MOD LIVE TOUR in CLUB CITTA' ライブ DVD)	K2VD-0004	Comiket 97	Touhou Project

=== Other appearances ===
Title	Year	Main Artist	Album	Peak
The Moon and Izayoi feat. nano x Kisida Kyodan & The Akebosi Rockets	2021	Touhou LostWord	—	—
Flowers That Bloomed in Fantasy feat. Kisida Kyodan & The Akebosi Rockets x Kayoko Kusano	2021	Touhou Danmaku Kagura	—	—
DEAR JUNKS feat. Kisida Kyodan & The Akebosi Rockets	2021	EXiNA	DiViNE	57
Desire Drive feat. Kisida Kyodan & The Akebosi Rockets	2022	Touhou Danmaku Kagura	—	—

=== Kisida Kyodan dōjin CDs ===
	Release date	Title	Catalog number	Release event	Based on
1st	2005-12-30	SUPERNOVA	K2-0001	Comiket 69	Type-Moon works, Touhou Project and original composition
2nd	2006-05-21	Akeboshi Rocket (明星ロケット)	K2-0002	Reitaisai 3	Touhou Project
3rd	2006-12-31	SuperSonicSpeedStar	K2-0003	Comiket 71	Touhou Project
4th	2007-12-31	Hoshizora Logic (星空ロジック)	K2-0005	Comiket 73	Original composition
