= Misaki (name) =

- Pronunciation: [misaki]
- Gender: Female

Origin
- Origin: Japanese
- Meaning: different meanings depending on the Kanji

Other names
- Related names: Misa; Misako; Misato (given name); Misumi

Misaki (みさき, ミサキ) is a popular feminine Japanese given name occasionally used for men. It can also be used as a surname.

== Written forms ==
Misaki can be written using different kanji characters and can mean:

=== As a given name ===
- 美咲 "beautiful, blossom"
- 美沙紀 "beautiful, sand, chronicle"
- 海咲 “ocean, blossom”

The given name can also be written in hiragana or katakana.

=== As a surname ===
- 岬 "cape/promontory"
- 三崎 "three promontories"
- 三咲 "three blossoms"
- 美崎 "beautiful promontory"
- 見崎 "to look, promontory"

== People with the given name ==
=== Men ===
- Misaki Haruyama (晴山 岬; born 2001), male Japanese footballer
- Misaki Kubota (久保田 美咲), male Japanese mixed martial artist
- Misaki Wayengera (born 1979), Ugandan physician, academician, and a medical researcher

=== Women ===
- Misaki Amano (天野 実咲; born 1985), Japanese former professional football goalkeeper and goalkeeping coach
- Misaki Doi (土居 美咲; born 1991), Japanese professional tennis player
- Misaki Emura (江村 美咲; born 1998), Japanese fencer
- Misaki Ito (伊東 美咲; born 1977), Japanese actress, model, and idol
- Misaki Iwasa (岩佐 美咲; born 1995), Japanese idol, enka singer, and a member of Jpop group AKB48
- Misaki Kawai (河井 美咲; born 1978), Japanese artist
- Misaki Kobayashi (小林 海咲; born 1990), Japanese squash player
- Misaki Kumakura (熊倉 美咲; born 1983), Japanese rower
- Misaki Kuno (久野 美咲; born 1993), Japanese voice actress and singer
- Misaki Matsuda (松田 美咲; born 1998), Japanese tennis player
- Misaki Matsutomo (松友 美佐紀; born 1992), Japanese badminton player
- Misaki Momose (桃瀬 美咲; born 1993), Japanese actress and tarento
- Misaki Morizono (森薗 美咲; born 1992), Japanese table tennis player
- Misaki Nobata (野畑 美咲; born 2003), Japanese sports shooter
- Misaki Ohata (大畠 美咲; born 1989), Japanese professional wrestler
- Misaki Onishi (尾西 美咲; born 1985), Japanese long-distance runner
- Misaki Oshigiri (押切 美沙紀; born 1992), Japanese speed skater
- Misaki Oshiro (大城 みさき; born 1984), Japanese weightlifter
- Misaki Ozawa (小沢 みさき; born 1985), Japanese former field hockey player
- Misaki Sekiyama (関山 美沙紀; born 1981), Japanese voice actress
- Misaki Suzuki (鈴木 実沙紀; born 1992), Japanese rugby union player
- Misaki Watada (和多田 美咲), Japanese voice actress
- Misaki Yabumoto (籔本光咲), Japanese karateka
- Misaki Yamaguchi (山口 美咲; born 1990), Japanese swimmer

== People with the surname ==
- Ayame Misaki (水崎 綾女; born 1989), Japanese actress
- Erin Misaki (born 1981), American soccer player
- Hiromi Misaki (三崎 宏美; born 1976), Japanese sport shooter
- Juri Misaki (みさき 樹里; born 1980), Japanese manga artist
- Kazuo Misaki (三崎 和雄), Japanese professional mixed martial arts fighter and former judoka
- Kiyoshi Misaki (見崎 清志; born 1946), Japanese racing driver
- Mitsuhiro Misaki (見崎 充洋; born 1970), Japanese football player
- Nako Misaki (岬 なこ), Japanese voice actress and singer
- Shiro Misaki (三崎 四郎), Japanese football player

== Characters with the given name ==
- Misaki, a character from the Dead or Alive Xtreme Venus Vacation
- Misaki Aoyagi, a character in the manga Loveless
- Misaki Asou, one of the protagonists in the video game Fatal Frame 4
- Misaki Ayuzawa, the main character of the anime/manga Maid Sama!
- Misaki Harada (美咲), a character in the anime Gakuen Alice
- Misaki Jurai (美砂樹), a character in the anime Tenchi Muyo!
- Misaki Kamiigusa (上井草 美咲), a character of Sakura-sō no Pet na Kanojo
- Misaki Katsuo (美咲), a character in the visual novel Killer Chat!
- Misaki Kirihara (霧原 未咲), character of Darker than Black
- Misaki Kureha, the main character in the anime Divergence Eve and Misaki Chronicles
- Misaki Mei, a character in the anime Another
- Misaki Nakahara (中原 岬), character of Welcome to the N.H.K.
- Misaki Oga, a character in the anime Beelzebub
- Misaki Okusawa, a character from the BanG Dream! media franchise
- Misaki Shokuhō (食蜂操祈), a character of A Certain Magical Index
- Misaki Shouta, a character in the manga Hana No Mizo Shiru
- Misaki Suzuhara (みさき), the main character in the anime Angelic Layer
- Misaki Takahashi (美咲), a male main character in the anime Junjou Romantica
- Misaki Taniguchi (谷口 美咲), a main character in the crime drama TV series Tokyo Vice
- Misaki Tobisawa (鳶沢 みさき), a main heroine in the visual novel and anime Aokana - Four Rhythms Across the Blue and the main heroine in the sequel EXTRA2.
- Misaki Tokura (戸倉 ミサキ), a character of Cardfight!! Vanguard
- Misaki Yata (美咲), a male character in the anime K Project

== Characters with the surname ==
- Akeno Misaki (岬), a protagonist in the anime series High School Fleet
- Taro Misaki (岬), a male character in the manga, anime, and video game series Captain Tsubasa
- Hana Misaki (岬 話), a manager of Jōzenji High in Haikyū!!
- Ryo Misaki (岬), a minor character in the anime Angelic Layer
- Shiki Misaki, a protagonist in the video game The World Ends with You
