= Hiroyuki Yoshino (screenwriter) =

Japanese screenwriter (born 1970)

Hiroyuki Yoshino (吉野 弘幸, Yoshino Hiroyuki; born June 2, 1970 in Chiba Prefecture) is a Japanese screenwriter. He has written several anime series for Sunrise, including My-HiME and My-Otome.

== Biography ==
Yoshino graduated from Waseda University's school of literature and later joined the staff of Tokuma Shoten's Animage magazine as a writer. It was here that the Sunrise producer Naotake Furusato offered him a position in the studio as screenwriter. After joining Sunrise, his first project as the head writer responsible for series composition was Mai-HiME, whose follow-ups Mai-Otome and Mai-Otome Zwei he also went on to supervise. He authored the manga adaptation of Mai-Otome (along with Tatsuhito Higuchi) and went on to write numerous other manga series. Yoshino served as the assistant to main series composer Ichiro Okouchi, during both seasons of the Code Geass TV series. Among other projects for different animation studios, he has written Macross Frontier, Denpa teki na Kanojo, Sound of the Sky, Dance in the Vampire Bund and Guilty Crown.

== Screenwriting ==
- series head writer denoted in bold

=== Anime television series ===
- Gear Fighter Dendoh (2000–2001)
- Crush Gear Turbo (2001–2003)
- Mobile Suit Gundam Seed (2002–2003)
- Machine Robo Rescue (2003)
- **My-HiME** (2004–2005)
- Mobile Suit Gundam SEED Destiny (2005)
- **My-Otome** (2005–2006)
- **Code Geass: Lelouch of the Rebellion** (2006–2007): assistant head writer
- Idolmaster: Xenoglossia (2007)
- **Macross Frontier** (2008)
- **Code Geass: Lelouch of the Rebellion R2** (2008): assistant head writer
- Black Butler (2008–2009)
- Darker than Black (2009)
- **Sound of the Sky** (2010)
- **Dance in the Vampire Bund** (2010)
- Fractale (2010–2011)
- **Guilty Crown** (2011–2012)
- **Accel World** (2012)
- **Magi: The Labyrinth of Magic** (2012–2013)
- **Vividred Operation** (2013)
- A Certain Scientific Railgun S (2013)
- **Strike the Blood** (2013–2014)
- **Magi: The Kingdom of Magic** (2013–2014)
- Nagi-Asu: A Lull in the Sea (2013–2014)
- **Black Butler: Book of Circus** (2014)
- **Trinity Seven** (2014)
- **World Trigger** (2014–2016, 2021–2022)
- Kantai Collection (2015)
- Rin-ne (2015–2016)
- **Heavy Object** (2015–2016)
- **Izetta: The Last Witch** (2016)
- Mobile Suit Gundam: Iron-Blooded Orphans (2016–2017)
- Chain Chronicle (2017)
- Chronos Ruler (2017)
- MARGINAL #4 (2017)
- **A Certain Magical Index III** (2018–2019)
- Tsurune (2018–2019)
- GeGeGe no Kitarō 6th series (2018–2020)
- The Magnificent Kotobuki (2019)
- Tropical-Rouge! Pretty Cure (2021–2022)
- **Black Butler: Public School Arc** (2024)
- **Bye Bye, Earth** (2024)
- **Black Butler: Emerald Witch Arc** (2025)
- **Within the Villainess** (2027)

=== Anime films ===
- **Macross Frontier: Itsuwari no Utahime** (2009)
- **Macross Frontier: Sayonara no Tsubasa** (2011)
- **A Certain Magical Index: The Movie – The Miracle of Endymion** (2013)
- **Black Butler: Book of the Atlantic** (2017)
- **Birth of Kitarō: The Mystery of GeGeGe** (2023)
- **You and Idol Pretty Cure the Movie: For You! Our Kirakilala Concert!** (2025)

=== OVAs ===
- **My-Otome Zwei** (2006-2007)
- **Denpa teki na Kanojo** (2009)
- **Black Butler: Book of Murder** (2015)
- Exodus! Exit Tokyo (2015)
- The Third Girls Aerial Squad: Falling Angel (2015)
- **Strike the Blood: Kingdom of the Valkyria** (2015)
- **Strike the Blood II** (2016–2017)
- **Strike the Blood III** (2018–2019)
- **Strike the Blood IV** (2020–2021)
- **Strike the Blood Final** (2022)

== Manga ==
- My-Otome (2005–2006) Co-authoring with Tatsuhito Higuchi; Art by Kenetsu Satō
- Mai-Otome Arashi (2006) Co-authoring with Tatsuhito Higuchi; Art by Kenetsu Satō
- The Qwaser of Stigmata (2006–2016) Art by Kenetsu Satō
- VITA Sexualis (ja) (2007–2013) Co-authoring with Tatsuhito Higuchi ; Art by Kenetsu Satō and E-ji Komatsu
- Shinju No Nectar (ja) (2016–) Art by Kenetsu Satō
- Okashi Ayakashi Yōyō Ibun (2021–2023) Art by Foi
- Mobile Suit Gundam: Rust Horizon (ja) (2022–) Art by Kenichi Terada
