= List of Strike the Blood characters =

The following is a list of characters from Strike the Blood.

== Characters ==
=== Main characters ===
Kojo Akatsuki (暁 古城, Akatsuki Kojō)
Voiced by: Yoshimasa Hosoya, Mutsumi Tamura (child)
Three months prior to the beginning of the story, typical Saikai Private Academy (私立彩海学園) high school student Kojo Akatsuki became the Fourth Progenitor (第四真祖, dai yon shinso)) vampire, made so by his predecessor, Avrora Florestina who also blocked his memories of the event. When sexually aroused, he suffers nosebleeds and succumbs to a bloodlust eased only by drinking blood — early on, his own. Kojo possesses common vampire traits, such as superhuman strength, speed, reflexes and regeneration, but as a progenitor, he also possesses greater powers, especially the capacity to control familiars (眷獣, kenjuu) of which he inherited twelve from his predecessor. Each time he preys upon another human, he gains control over a familiar, which do not acknowledge him beforehand. In the future, he marries both Yukina and Asagi.

Yukina Himeragi (姫柊 雪菜, Himeragi Yukina)
Voiced by: Risa Taneda
A middle-school sword shaman (剣巫, Ken'nagi) from the ancient Lion King Agency (獅子王機関, Shishiou Kikan), Yukina was sent to 'observe' the Fourth Progenitor with special instructions to eliminate him should she deem him dangerous. To aid her in her duties, she is equipped with a magic halberd or lance named Sekkarou (雪霞狼). Taking her role as observer (監視者, kanshisha) overly seriously, she moves into the apartment next to Kojo's and follows him everywhere. Unbeknownst to her or anyone outside the Lion Kings' directors, her actual purpose is apparently to become the Fourth Progenitor's first blood partner and mate. Like many of its members, she was sold to the Lion Kings by her parents. While initially positioning herself exclusively as the observer of a dangerous threat to humanity, she soon begins exhibiting trust and romantic feelings towards Kojo and jealousy towards other women. During their battle against the Lotharingian exorcist Rudolf Eustach, she gives herself to Kojo, enabling him to first gain control of a familiar. In a glimpse into the future, she is presumed married to Kojo and has a daughter from him named Reina.

Asagi Aiba (藍羽 浅葱, Aiba Asagi)
Voiced by: Asami Seto
Asagi is Kojo's friend and classmate. She is an impossibly expert programmer and hacker who works part-time for the Itogami Island Management Corporation (絃神島管理公社) which administers the city and island; this provides her with access to powerful, hidden systems and information. She has a crush on Kojo but does not act upon it until feelings of jealousy are provoked by Yukina's arrival. Despite knowing that the island is deeply connected to supernatural persons and creatures, she is unaware that her friends are among them until Kojo and Yukina finally reveal the truth to her. Her own hidden identity is that of the Priestess of Cain (カインの巫女, Kain no miko).

Sayaka Kirasaka (煌坂 紗矢華, Kirasaka Sayaka)
Voiced by: Ikumi Hayama
A war dancer (舞威媛, mai-hime), which specialize in hexes and assassination, in the Lion King Agency, she is Yukina's former roommate and best friend. She wields a transforming sword/bow named Koukarin (煌華麟) in its sword form and der Freishütze (デアフライシュッツ) in its bow form. She is both overprotective of Yukina and androphobic, which gets Kojo off on the wrong foot when they first meet. Forced by circumstances to work closely with Kojo, she warms to him and eventually offers herself, gaining him control of a second familiar. Subsequent to this, she develops romantic feelings towards him. While her regular duties involve investigating international magical crimes, her encounters with Kojo were apparently similarly arranged by the Lion Kings with the same objective in mind as with Yukina.

Natsuki Minamiya (南宮 那月, Minamiya Natsuki)
Voiced by: Hisako Kanemoto
Natsuki is Kojo's English teacher and a renowned attack mage known as the Witch of the Void (空隙の魔女, kuugeki no majo). Her appearance is that of a grade school girl. Her typical garb is a black gothic lolita dress and she often carries a black parasol or folding fan. In addition to her duties as a teacher, she performs various security and investigative functions for the island. She becomes the guardian of Astarte and Kanon Kanase, and provider for Nina Adelard. As a witch, her guardian spirit is the Golden Guardian (黄金の守護者, ougon no shugosha) Rheingold (ラインゴルト).

Motoki Yaze (矢瀬 基樹, Yaze Motoki)
Voiced by: Ryōta Ōsaka
Motoki is secretly a member of the Lion Kings and the proper 'observer' of the Fourth Progenitor and as such, his actions are restricted. He is a classmate and friend to Kojo and Asagi. Knowing her well, he often encourages Asagi to pursue Kojo. He is an ESPer with the ability to manipulate sound waves in myriad ways but is susceptible to crippling headaches when exposed to loud noise. He often augments his abilities with a pair of headphones and occasionally with drugs.

Nagisa Akatsuki (暁 凪沙, Akatsuki Nagisa)
Voiced by: Rina Hidaka
Nagisa is Kojo's younger sister and attends the Saikai Academy middle school and is a classmate of Yukina and Kanon. She is gregarious and extraverted and quickly befriends Yukina when she moves in next door. Efforts are made by those close to her to keep her unaware of much of the supernatural activity that surrounds her brother. She was apparently traumatized after a demonic attack four years prior. She unknowingly carries remnants of Avrora who occasionally at critical moments when Nagisa is unconscious near a supernatural event, will possess her body and offer assistance or cryptic advice.

=== Supporting characters ===
Mogwai (モグワイ, Moguwai)
Voiced by: Shinji Kawada
Asagi's virtual partner who assists in her hacking missions. He is the avatar of the supercomputers that administrate Itogami Island (絃神島), but his deeper purpose is obscure.

Rin Tsukishima (築島 倫, Tsukishima Rin)
Voiced by: Rei Mochizuki
Asagi's friend who is frequently seen giving love advice to her. Because of her intelligence, Kojo occasionally feels as if she is aware that Kojo is not a human, but she still treats him like a normal person.

Astarte (アスタルテ, Asutarute)
Voiced by: Yuka Iguchi
A homunculus notable in that she controls a familiar, she arrived on Itogami Island as a servant to Eustach. She currently serves Minamiya as a maid. She typically expresses little emotion, and is not often talkative.

Kanon Kanase (叶瀬 夏音, Kanase Kanon)
Voiced by: Kanae Itō
A shy, silver-haired middle-school girl who is Nagisa's friend and classmate and an inveterate collector of feral cats. She is the illegitimate daughter of La Folia's grandfather, and thus her half-aunt and Polifonia's half-sister, and was raised in Japan. She is the subject of Kensei Kanase's Angel Faux (エンジェル･フォウ) experiment.

Dimitrie Vatler (ディミトリエ・ヴァトラー, Dimitorie Vuatorā), Lord Ardeal (アルデアル公, Arudearu-kou)
Voiced by: Yūki Ono
Also known by his title, Lord Ardeal, he is a vampire and representative of the Warlord's Empire (戦王領域, sen`ou ryouiki) who becomes its ambassador to Itogami Island. As a powerful, old vampire with too much free time he is constantly seeking strong enemies to fight and often interjects himself into situations which don’t concern him. Derisively called Snake Charmer (蛇遣い, hebitsukai) by some who know him well; all of his known familiars are serpents.

Avrora Florestina (アヴローラ・フロレスティーナ, Avurōra Furoresutīna)
Voiced by: Kaori Ishihara
The previous Fourth Progenitor who passed her powers to Kojo upon her death. A fragment of her soul, whatever that means, persists within Nagisa and occasionally possesses her at crucial moments. She controls the twelfth familiar.

La Folia Rihavein (ラ・フォリア・リハヴァイン, Ra Foria Rihavuain)
Voiced by: Saori Ōnishi
The princess of Aldegyr (アルディギア王国) is a beautiful, silver-haired girl first encountered when pursued by illicit weapons producer Magus Craft during the Angel Faux experiments. Kanon is her half-aunt.

Kensei Kanase (叶瀬 賢生, Kanase Kensei)
Voiced by: Yutaka Aoyama
A magical researcher and director of Magus Craft who after adopting his niece Kanon, makes her the centrepiece of the Angel Faux experimentation. Was previously a court mage in Aldegyr. Subsequently conducts research while held by the IIMC.

Nina Adelard (ニーナ・アデラード, Nīna Aderādo)
Voiced by: Mai Nakahara
An alchemist who is Kou's master and some 270 years of age. Her current physical body, while well-proportioned, is doll-sized.

Kiriha Kisaki (妃崎霧葉, Kisaki Kiriha)
Voiced by: Yukiyo Fujii
'Black sword shaman' or Rikujin Shinkan (六刃神官) with the Taishikyoku (太史局), a rival agency to the Lion Kings. She is both an antagonist and ally to Kojo with her own agenda. Her lance, Richel Carre (リチエルカーレ), possesses the ability to manipulate demonic energy.

Lydianne Didier (リディアーヌ・ディディエ, Ridiānu Didie)
Voiced by: Misaki Kuno
A young computer expert who likes and admires Asagi but is also eager to compete with her. She calls herself Tank Driver (戦車乗り, Senshanori) and drives a pink tank. Her family operates a major industrial firm.

Koyomi Shizuka (閑 古詠, Shizuka Koyomi), Paper Noise (静寂破り「ペーパーノイズ」, Pēpānoizu)
Voiced by: Kana Ueda
Member of the Three Saints (三聖, sansei), the leaders of the Lion King Agency. A quiet individual with long braided hair and glasses who often wears a shrine maiden outfit, she attends Saikai Academy and is in an apparent relationship with Motoki. She is often referred to by her unique spell name, Paper Noise.

Rudolf Eustach (ルードルフ・オイスタッハ, Rūdorufu Oisutahha)
Voiced by: Kenta Miyake
A combat deacon (殲教師, senkyoushi) of Lotharingia (ロタリンギア), he is a powerful fighter and exorcist who comes to Itogami Island to retrieve a religious relic taken from the church. He initially controls Astarte until their defeat by Kojo and Yukina.

Christoph Gardos (クリストフ・ガルドシュ, Kurisutofu Garudoshu)
Voiced by: Eizō Tsuda
The therianthrope (獣人, juujin) leader of the Black Death Emperor Faction (黒死皇派, kuroshi sumeragiha) and a former soldier of the Warlord's Empire.

Beatrice Basler (ベアトリス・バスラー, Beatorisu Basurā)
Voiced by: Satomi Arai
An employee of Magus Craft. A vampire, she wields a spear possessing the familiar Jabra.

Lowe Kirishima (ロウ・キリシマ, Rou Kirishima)
Voiced by: Yūki Hayashi
Therianthrope, employee of Magus Craft and bush pilot

Yuuma Tokoyogi (仙都木 優麻, Tokoyogi Yūma)
Voiced by: Yumi Uchiyama
Kojo's childhood friend. Known as the 'Blue Witch' (蒼の魔女, ao no majo), she is a clone of her mother Aya, engineered with the singular purpose of freeing her from prison. She is apparently a member of The Library (図書館, toshokan) but is not very active with the organization. Her guardian spirit is Le Bleu (ル・ブルー), the 'Blue Knight' (青の騎士, ao no kishi).

Aya Tokoyogi (仙都木 阿夜, Tokoyogi Aya)
Voiced by: Mikako Takahashi
Yuuma's mother and the Witch of Notaria (ノタリアの魔女, notaria no majo), she has strong feelings about the status of witches in society. She is imprisoned behind Itogami Island’s prison barrier. She was a member of the Library. Her guardian spirit is L'Ombre (ル・オンブル).

Meiga Itogami (絃神 冥駕, Itogami Meiga)
Voiced by: Natsuki Hanae
The sole convict to escape from behind the prison barrier, he is a former Lion King adept and wields Fangzahn (ファングツァーン), a prototype lance which he stole after his release.

Kou Amatsuka (天塚 汞, Amatsuka Kō)
Voiced by: Yūki Kaji
Homunculus alchemist and Nina Adelard's apprentice

Wiseman (“賢者” ワイズマン, waizuman)
Voiced by: Taketora
Megalomaniacal alchemist who uses Amatsuka Kou to restore his body

Kazuomi Kusuki (久須木 和臣, Kusuki Kazuomi)
Voiced by: Shintaro Asanuma
Director of the Blue Elysium resort and the demon management company Kusuki-Elysée. A part-time eco-terrorist leader.

Mimori Akatsuki (暁 深森, Akatsuki Mimori)
Voiced by: Sanae Kobayashi
Kojo's mother and chief of research at Magna Ataraxia Research’s (MAR) medical department. A magic physician and Hyper Adaptor (過適応能力者), her research involves Sybil, the apparent Priestess of Abel.

Reina Akatsuki (暁 零菜, Akatsuki Reina)
Voiced by: Kana Asumi
Apparent daughter of Yukina and Kojo who arrives like a terminator from twenty years in the future to eliminate an artificial magical beast and bring Yukina a more advanced Sekkarou.

Moegi Akatsuki (暁 萌葱, Akatsuki Moegi)
Voiced by: Minami Tsuda
Apparent daughter of Asagi and Kojo. She operated the time machine that sent back Reina Akatsuki.

Yume Eguchi (江口結眼, Eguchi Yume)
Voiced by: Nao Toyama
A young girl who Kojo meets at a holiday resort. She is a succubus with a split personality and a great hidden power.

Polifonia Rihavein (ポリフォニア・リハヴァイン, Porifonia Rihavuain)
Voiced by: Mamiko Noto
Mother of La Folia and queen of Aldegyr

Lucas Rihavein (ルーカス・リハヴァイン, Rukasu Rihavuain)
Voiced by: Tetsu Inada
Father of La Folia and king of Aldegyr

Trine Harden (トリーネ・ハルデン, Torīne Haruden)
Voiced by: Minami Takahashi
Therianthrope terrorist and irresistible seductress from the North Sea Empire (北海帝国)

Hisano Akatsuki (緋 紗 乃つ き さ の, Akatsuki Hisano)
Voiced by: Kazue Komiya
Grandmother of Kojo and Nagisa and powerful priestess

Gajou Akatsuki (牙 城つ ょ う, Akatsuki Gajou)
Voiced by: Yasuyuki Kase
Father of Kojo and Nagisa, ex-husband of Mimori

Yuiri Haba (羽波 唯里, Haba Yuiri)
Voiced by: Sayaka Senbongi
Sword shaman with the Lion Kings

Shio Hikawa (斐川 志緒, Hikawa Shio)
Voiced by: Kaede Hondo
War dancer with the Lion Kings

Iblisveil Aziz (イブリスベール・アズィーズ, Ibirisu Beru Azuizu)
Voiced by: Mutsumi Tamura
Ibliss is a vampire noble from the Warlord’s Empire who befriends Asagi and Lydianne.

Tatsumi Azama (安座真 達己, Azama Tatsumi)
Voiced by: Show Hayami
A major with the JDSF (自衛隊員) anti-mage regiment as well as the Knight of the Sinful God (咎神の騎士, Kyūshin no kishi) and leader of the cult.

Mikage Okiyama (沖山 観影, Okiyama Mikage)
Voiced by: Shizuka Ishigami
A lieutenant with the JDSF anti-mage regiment as well as a knight of the Sinful God cult.

Ueyanagi (上柳, Ueyanagi)
Voiced by: Daiki Hamano
A lieutenant with the JDSF anti-mage regiment as well as a knight of the Sinful God cult.

Glenda (グレンダ, Grenda)
Voiced by: Misaki Watada
A girl who shifts between a human and dragon form, she bonds deeply with Yuiri after being rescued by her.

Senga Takehito (千賀 毅人, Takehito Senga)
Voiced by: Kōsuke Toriumi
Behind the scenes leader of the Tartarus Lapse (タルタロス・ラプス) terrorists

December (ディセンバー, Disenbā)
Voiced by: Lynn
Leader of the Tartarus Lapse terrorists, and similarly to Avrora, is connected to Kojo by being a partial seal of his power and the master of his tenth familiar.

Shizuri Castiella Kasugaya (香管谷 雫梨, Kasugaya Shizuri Castiella)
Voiced by: Saya Aizawa
A paladiness of Gisella, who was said to be Kojo's observer when they trained together at Onrai Island for half a year.
