= Misaki Watada =

Japanese voice actress

- 和多田 美咲
- Born: March 16; Iwate Prefecture, Japan
- Occupation: Voice actress
- Years active: 2010–present
- Agent: Aoni Production

Misaki Watada (和多田 美咲, Watada Misaki; born March 16) is a Japanese voice actress affiliated with Aoni Production. Some of her notable roles include Michiru in Hell Girl, Futari Gotoh in Bocchi the Rock!, Glenda in Strike the Blood, Delmin in Show by Rock!!, Yaeka Sakuragi in The Yakuza's Guide to Babysitting, Rinrin Shinomiya in Himitsu no AiPri, and Meisho Doto in Umamusume: Pretty Derby.

== Biography ==
Watada was born in Iwate Prefecture and raised in Shizuoka Prefecture. During her elementary years, she enjoyed recording herself and her friends' voices on cassette tapes, and also developed a yearning for acting after seeing a local theater performance. She became interested in voice acting after seeing videos of actors recording their lines, which she was fascinated by. Watada graduated from the Amusement Media Academy in March 2015.

Watada cites Ikue Ōtani as an influence, stating that she loved her performance as Stephanie Tanner in the Japanese dub of the American sitcom Full House, and that she wanted to play the role of a child in a dubbed series. In 2017, she voiced Pamela in the dub of the sequel series Fuller House.

== Filmography ==
=== Television animation ===
2016

- Myriad Colors Phantom World as Arina
- Battle Spirits Double Drive as Kento Mogami, Mofumofu
- ClassicaLoid as Miiko

2017

- Kemono Friends as Golden Snub-Nosed Monkey
- Chibi Maruko-chan as Yasuko
- Princess Principal as Amy Anderson
- Hell Girl: The Fourth Twilight as Michiru
- Magical Circle Guru Guru as Chikurima
- Just Because! as Mutsuki Morikawa
- Altair: A Record of Battles as Nicole

2018

- Umamusume: Pretty Derby as Meisho Doto
- Case Closed as Miona Yuri
- Sirius the Jaeger as Lalisa

2019

- Hitori Bocchi no Marumaru Seikatsu as Yanai Himeji
- Afterlost as Karin

2020

- Show by Rock!! Mashumairesh!! as Delmin
- If My Favorite Pop Idol Made It to the Budokan, I Would Die as Yūka Teramoto
- Sakura Wars the Animation as Clara
- Digimon Adventure as Hikari Yagami

2021

- Show by Rock!! Stars!! as Delmin
- Love Live! Superstar!! as Sumire's younger sister
- Sakugan as Muro

2022

- In the Heart of Kunoichi Tsubaki as Ume
- The Yakuza's Guide to Babysitting as Yaeka Sakuragi
- Parallel World Pharmacy as Chiyu Yakutani
- Shadows House 2nd Season as Margaret
- Sylvanian Families: Flare no Happy Diary as Creme Chocolate
- Bocchi the Rock! as Futari Gotoh

2023

- In Another World with My Smartphone 2nd Season as Pamela Noel "Noel"
- Reborn as a Vending Machine, I Now Wander the Dungeon as Kanashi
- Sylvanian Families Freya no Go for Dream! as Creme Chocolate

2024

- Shibuya Hachi as Hachi
- Himitsu no AiPri as Rinrin Shinomiya
- Failure Frame: I Became the Strongest and Annihilated Everything with Low-Level Spells as Lizbeth

2025

- I Have a Crush at Work as Chiharu Utō
- I May Be a Guild Receptionist, But I'll Solo Any Boss to Clock Out on Time as Fiena
- #Compass 2.0: Combat Providence Analysis System as Delmin
- Detectives These Days Are Crazy! as Fū-chan

2026

- Digimon Beatbreak as Shakomon
- Noble Reincarnation: Born Blessed, So I'll Obtain Ultimate Power as Gigi

2027

- Tsugumi Project as Tsugumi

=== Theatrical animation ===
2024

- Umamusume: Pretty Derby – Beginning of a New Era as Meisho Doto
- Mononoke the Movie: Phantom in the Rain as Futsukadzuki

2025

- Doraemon: Nobita's Art World Tales as Claire

=== Original video animation ===
2017

- Strike the Blood as Glenda (Note: Strike the Blood II (2017), Strike the Blood III (2018–2019), Strike the Blood IV (2020–2021), and Strike the Blood Final (2022))

=== Original net animation ===
2021

- The Heike Story as Taira no Takakiyo
- The Missing 8 as Corey

2022

- Umayuru as Meisho Doto

2023

- Umamusume: Pretty Derby – Road to the Top as Meisho Doto

2026

- Umayuru: Full Gate! as Meisho Doto

=== Video games ===
2016

- Hōkago Girls Tribe as Chidori Ōgi

2018

- God Eater Resonant Ops as Shante
- God Eater 3 as Player (Female), Sho Pennywort
- Kōsei Girl as Albari

2019

- Blade Xlord as Tam-Tam
- Renshin Astral as Jose

2020

- Touhou Spell Bubble as Flandre Scarlet
- Quiz RPG: The World of Mystic Wiz as Chitose
- Show by Rock!! Fes A Live as Delmin
- Atelier Ryza 2: Lost Legends & the Secret Fairy as Fi

2021

- Hexagon Dungeon: The Arcana's Stone as Lilith
- Rakugaki Kingdom as Sherry Jerry, Flandre Scarlet
- Umamusume: Pretty Derby as Meisho Doto
- Maglam Lord as Julette

2022

- Fate/Grand Order as Xu Fu
- Digimon Survive as Miu Shinonome
- Azur Lane as Miyuki
- Echocalypse: The Scarlet Covenant as Iori

2023

- 404 Game Re:set as Dynamite Cop
- Rear Sekai as Risa
- Tales of the Rays as Ernat Perusha

2025

- Alice Gear Aegis as Kanaya Neri
- Guardian Tales as Chriselle
- Kemono Teatime as Macaron

2026

- Mahjong Fight Girl as Jun Shigoronuki

=== Drama CD ===
2017

- Orenchi no Maid-san as Micchan
- Onsen Musume as Kanade Baden Yufuin
- Sister-in-Law! as Lulu

2020

- The Yakuza's Guide to Babysitting as Yaeka Sakuragi

=== Dubbing ===
- Marcel the Shell with Shoes On (Marcel)
- Vic the Viking: The Magic Sword (Ylvie)
