= Misato =

Misato may refer to:

== Places ==
- Misato, Akita, a town in Akita Prefecture
- Misato, Gunma, a town in Gunma Prefecture
- Misato, Kumamoto, a town in Kumamoto Prefecture
- Misato, Mie, a village in Mie Prefecture
- Misato, Miyagi, a town in Miyagi Prefecture
- Misato, Miyazaki, a town in Miyazaki Prefecture
- Misato, Nagano, a village in Nagano Prefecture
- Misato, Saitama (city), a city in Saitama Prefecture
- Misato, Saitama (town), a town in Saitama Prefecture
- Misato, Shimane, a town in Shimane Prefecture
- Misato, Tokushima, a village in Tokushima Prefecture
- Misato, Wakayama, a town in Wakayama Prefecture

== Other uses ==
- Misato (given name), a feminine Japanese given name
- Misato (surname), a Japanese surname
