= List of The Qwaser of Stigmata volumes =

The chapters of the Japanese manga series The Qwaser of Stigmata were written by Hiroyuki Yoshino and illustrated by Kenetsu Satō. The manga was serialized in Akita Shoten's manga magazine Champion Red from August 19, 2006, to July 9, 2016. Akita Shoten collected its chapters in 24 tankōbon volumes, released from December 20, 2006, to September 20, 2016.

The manga was licensed for English release in North America by Tokyopop; the company only published the first two volumes, which were released on August 10, 2010, and March 8, 2011, respectively.

== Volumes ==
No.	Original release date	Original ISBN	English release date	English ISBN
01	December 20, 2006	978-4-253-23103-9	August 10, 2010	978-1-427-81674-0
02	April 20, 2007	978-4-253-23104-6	March 8, 2011	978-1-427-81675-7
03	September 20, 2007	978-4-253-23105-3	June 28, 2011 (canceled)	978-1-427-81676-4
04	February 20, 2008	978-4-253-23106-0	November 1, 2011 (canceled)	978-1-427-81677-1
05	July 18, 2008	978-4-253-23107-7	—	—
06	December 19, 2008	978-4-253-23108-4	—	—
07	April 20, 2009	978-4-253-23109-1	—	—
08	December 18, 2009	978-4-253-23476-4	—	—
09	April 20, 2010	978-4-253-23477-1	—	—
10	October 20, 2010	978-4-253-23478-8	—	—
11	March 18, 2011	978-4-253-23479-5	—	—
12	August 19, 2011	978-4-253-23480-1	—	—
13	January 20, 2012	978-4-253-23481-8	—	—
14	June 20, 2012	978-4-253-23482-5	—	—
15	December 20, 2012	978-4-253-23483-2	—	—
16	May 20, 2013	978-4-253-23484-9	—	—
17	October 18, 2013	978-4-253-23485-6	—	—
18	March 20, 2014	978-4-253-23486-3	—	—
19	August 20, 2014	978-4-253-23487-0	—	—
20	January 20, 2015	978-4-253-23488-7	—	—
21	June 19, 2015	978-4-253-23801-4	—	—
22	November 20, 2015	978-4-253-23802-1	—	—
23	April 20, 2016	978-4-253-23803-8	—	—
24	September 20, 2016	978-4-253-23804-5	—	—
