= Myšák =

Myšák (feminine: Myšáková) is a Czech and Slovak surname, meaning 'male mouse'. Notable people with the surname include:

- Denis Myšák (born 1995), Slovak sprint canoeist
- Jan Myšák (born 2002), Czech ice hockey player
- Lawrence Mysak (born 1940), Canadian applied mathematician
- Lubomír Myšák (born 1979), Czech footballer
- Roman Mysak (born 1991), Ukrainian footballer

== See also ==
- Mišak
