= Hiroyuki Yoshino (disambiguation) =

Hiroyuki Yoshino (born 1974) is a Japanese voice actor.

Hiroyuki Yoshino may refer to:

- Hiroyuki Yoshino (screenwriter) (born 1970), Japanese screenwriter
- Hiroyuki Yoshino (kickboxer), former national Japanese champion and early member of the All Japan Kickboxing Federation
- Hiroyuki Yoshino (engineer), former president of Honda Motor Company from 1998 to 2003
- Hiroyuki Yoshino (football executive), former president of the Japanese football team Júbilo Iwata
- Hiroyuki Yoshino (The Idolmaster), a character in the Idolmaster franchise
