= Yutaka Aoyama =

Japanese actor, voice actor and narrator (born 1965)

- 青山 穣
- Born: January 30, 1965 (age 61); Aichi Prefecture, Japan
- Other name: Jyo Aoyama
- Education: Nihon University
- Occupations: Actor; voice actor; narrator
- Years active: 1990–present
- Agent: Kenyu Office
- Height: 174 cm (5 ft 9 in)

Yutaka Aoyama (青山 穣, Aoyama Yutaka; born January 30, 1965) is a Japanese actor, voice actor and narrator.

== Biography ==
Aoyama became interested in film in elementary school. As there was no film study group in the junior high school he attended, he joined the drama club. Because almost all of the forty members were girls, he felt alienated in the club. Aoyama went on to study theatre at Nihon University.

After graduation, Aoyama spent some years in London, where he took mostly private classes in acting. After returning to Japan, he started working part-time at Kabukiza Theatre. There, a person recommended him to try voice acting. Aoyama attended Visual Techno Academia and was cast in a main role immediately after graduation.

== Filmography ==
=== Anime ===
List of voice performances in anime
Year	Title	Role	Notes	Source
1993	Nintama Rantaro	Father of Iseu, Masayoshi Sakuta		
1997	Berserk	Samson, Torturer		
1999	Turn A Gundam	Operation Chief		
2000	Mighty Cat Masked Niyander	Miquet ミケ		
2000	Sakura Wars	Policeman		
2000	Ghost Stories	Mr. Sakata		
2001	Great Dangaioh	Aide 補佐官		
2002	Saikano	Soldier		
2002	Ichi the Killer: Episode 0	Father	OVA	
2002	Naruto	Moya Triad – Aniki		
2002	Haibane Renmei	Clock shop owner		
2003	Tank Knights Fortress	Mine Sporken		
2003	Kino's Journey	Boatman		
2003	Detective School Q	Mr. Lion; Mr.ライオン		
2003	Peacemaker Kurogane	Kanmi Furuba		
2004	Gokusen	Shirakawa Gamarou 白川雁一郎		
2004	Tenbatsu! Angel Rabbie	Elder	OVA	
2004	Monster	Doctor		
2004	Bleach	Toshi Rin / Iemura Yasochika としりん/伊江村八十千和		
2004	Yakitate!! Japan	Shadow White		
2005	Gallery Fake	Muhammad ムハマド		
2005	Eyeshield 21	Tony / Master トニー/師匠		
2005	Eureka Seven	Vodarak's father ヴォダラクの父		
2005	Cluster Edge	engineer 技術者		
2005	SoltyRei	Resumable Rescue Team Leader リゼンブル救助隊リーダー		
2006	Fighting Beauty Wulong Rebirth	Yuan ユアン		
2006	Glass Fleet	Conrad コンラッド		
2006	Gintama	Okada Nizou		
2006	The Galaxy Railways: Crossroads to Eternity	Rutherford ラザフォード		
2006	Hataraki Man	Craftsman 職人		
2006	Bartender	Tajima 田島		
2007	Koi suru Tenshi Angelique ~ Kagayaki no Ashita ~	Edgar エドガー		
2007	Tokyo Majin	Yan, Azumabashi, others	2 seasons	
2007	Dinosaur King	Ungaro ウンガロ		
2007	Naruto: Shippuden	Sasori / Hiruko サソリ/ヒルコ		
2007	Claymore	Innkeeper 宿屋の主人		
2007	Romeo × Juliet	Noble man 貴族の男		
2007	Darker Than Black	Itzak イツァーク		
2007	Bokurano: Ours	Kamioka chief 神岡署長		
2007	Emma – A Victorian Romance: Second Act	Wilhelm Mereders ヴィルヘルム・メルダース		
2007	Devil May Cry	Alex アレックス		
2007	Shigurui	Tamba Yuya Saku 丹波蝙也斎		
2007	Neuro: Supernatural Detective	Togashi トガシ		
2007	Clannad	Black clothes man / gentleman 黒服の男/紳士		
2007	Harukanaru Toki no Naka de 3 ~Kurenai no Tsuki~	Elder 長老		
2008	Porphy no Nagai Tabi	Carlos カルロス		
2008	Ancient Ruler Dinosaur King DKidz Adventure: Pterosaur Legend	Hanzo 半蔵		
2008	Yu-Gi-Oh 5D's	Malcom マルコム		
2008	Kirarin ☆ Revolution STAGE 3	Narrator		
2008	Itazura na Kiss	Robins ロビンス		
2008	Blue Dragon	Schmidt シュミット		
2008	Himitsu: Top Secret ~The Revelation~	Commentator / detective 解説者/刑事		
2008	Golgo 13	Karl Roman カール・ローマン		
2008	Slayers Revolution	Pirate		
2008–09	Birdy the Mighty: Decode	Lou Megius ルー・メギウス	2 seasons	
2008	Black Butler	Arthur Randall アーサー・ランドル		
2008	Mōryō no Hako	Koichi Satomura 里村紘市		
2008	Nodame Cantabile Paris	Pierre		
2009	Rideback	Hugh Gatome ヒュー・ガトーム		
2009	Slayers Evolution-R	Bandits		
2009	Requiem for the Phantom	Mendes メンデス		
2009	Mazinger Edition Z: The Impact!	Django ジャンゴ		
2009	Guin Saga	Loudi ラウディ		
2009	Sōten Kōro	Xun You 荀攸		
2009	Tatakau Shisho	Vauxal-Mériot ヴーエキサル=メリオト		
2009	Sister Brothers ja:ご姉弟物語	Men in a stand 屋台の男性		
2009–2019	Fairy Tail	Jura, Klodoa, Jackpot, Franmalth		
2010	Cobra the Animation	Seven セブン		
2010	Hanamaru Kindergarten	Tsuchida's father 土田の父		
2010	Nodame Cantabile Finale	Pierre ピエール		
2010	Black Butler II	Arthur Randall アーサー・ランドル		
2010	Okami-san and Seven Companions	Hamel ハーメル		
2010	Occult Academy	Historian 歴史家		
2010–11	Air Gear: Break on the Sky	Narrator	OVA series	
2011	Hanasaku Iroha	Old gentleman 老紳士		
2011	Gyakkyō Burai Kaiji: Hakairoku-hen	Doctor		
2011	Pretty Rhythm Aurora Dream	Producer / Grandfather プロデューサー/おじいさん		
2011	The Qwaser of Stigmata II	Clifford · C · J · Crawford クリフォード・C・J・クロフォード		
2011	Sekai-ichi Hatsukoi 2	Masamune's father		
2012	Space Brothers	Eggplant Shigeo 茄子田シゲオ		
2012	Lupin the Third: The Woman Called Fujiko Mine	Announcement of earphone guide イヤホンガイドのアナウンス		
2012	Tari Tari	Condoru Quincy Cheerful コンドルクインズ陽気		
2012	Hayate the Combat Butler: Can't Take My Eyes Off You	Various characters		
2013	Zettai Karen Children: The Unlimited	Hadim ハジム		
2013	Space Battleship Yamato 2199	Welte Talan ヴェルテ・タラン		
2013	A Certain Scientific Railgun S	Doctor, Narrator		
2013	The Eccentric Family	Bishamon 毘沙門		
2013	Strike the Blood	Kensuke Konose 叶瀬賢生		
2014	Recently, My Sister Is Unusual	Tetsuya Shingen 神前哲也		
2014	Hamatora	Program host 番組司会者		
2014	Chaika - The Coffin Princess	Foden フォーデン		
2014	Argevollen	Hyuga Iwao ヒュウガ・イワオ		
2014	PriPara	Twin dad 双子パパ		
2014	Terror in Resonance	Shimada 島田		
2014	Gundam Reconguista in G	Captain Salamandra サラマンドラ艦長		
2014	Rage of Bahamut: Genesis	Golan ゴラン		
2014	Shirobako	Kono 河野		
2015	Food Wars!: Shokugeki no Soma	Kimigure of natural cheese ナチュラルチーズの久作		
2015	Uta no☆Prince-sama♪ Maji Love Revolution	Shiogane 石動玄		
2015	The Heroic Legend of Arslan	Baudouin		
2015	Heavy Object	officer 士官		
2015	Mobile Suit Gundam: Iron-Blooded Orphans	Todo Mirconen		
2015	Mr. Osomatsu	A man with a suit スーツの男		
2016	Dimension W	Seiji Makita 蒔田清純		
2016	Re:Zero − Starting Life in Another World	Rickert リッケルト		
2016	The Heroic Legend of Arslan: Dust Storm Dance	Baudouin		
2016	D.Gray-man Hallow	The Millennium Earl		
2016	The Disastrous Life of Saiki K.	Museum / Director 美術館・館長		
2016	Taboo Tattoo	Ajita アジタ		
2016	Cheer Boys!!	Professor Chen 陳教授		
2016	Active Raid	Kakuhari Kakuyama 角山博満		
2016	To Be Hero	Mr. Yamada		
2016	Drifters	Hannibal ハンニバル		
2017	100% Pascal-sensei	Brad Kanamori		
2017	Mahōjin Guru Guru	Gizaia ギザイア	Ep. 5	
2017	Digimon Universe: Appli Monsters	Virusmon バイラモン		
2018	Overlord II	Staffan Heivish	Ep. 7, 9	
2018	Golden Kamuy	Gotō 後藤	Ep. 1	
2018–2026	Fire Force	Dr. Giovanni		
2018–present	That Time I Got Reincarnated as a Slime	Myorumile		
2019–present	Kaguya-sama: Love Is War	Narrator		
2019	Star Twinkle PreCure	Abraham		
2019	Carole & Tuesday	Jerry		
2019	Radiant Season 2	Lord Gyuris		
2019	Case File nº221: Kabukicho	Michel Belmont		
2020	One Piece	Page One		
2020	Deca-Dence	Turkey		
2021	Suppose a Kid from the Last Dungeon Boonies Moved to a Starter Town	Pyrid		
2021	How a Realist Hero Rebuilt the Kingdom	Marx		
2021	Muteking the Dancing Hero	Matt		
2021	My Senpai Is Annoying	Department Chief		
2023	Junji Ito Maniac: Japanese Tales of the Macabre	Tagaisu	ONA	
2023	Dr. Stone: New World	Ibara		
2023	The Eminence in Shadow	Raphael Geerk Oriana		
2024	Kaiju No. 8	Masahide Tokuda		
2024	Code Geass: Rozé of the Recapture	Tokio Iwamoto	OVA	
2024	The Elusive Samurai	Ogasawara Sadamune		
2024	No Longer Allowed in Another World	Saitō		
2026	Jujutsu Kaisen	Reggie Star		
2026	The Ghost in the Shell	Kubonuma		

=== Film ===
List of voice performances in film
Year	Title	Role	Notes	Source
1998	Spriggan	Executive 幹部		
1999	Gundress: The Movie ja:ガンドレス	Captain Sumeragi		
2010	Loups=Garous	Riichiro Ishida		
2012	Detective Conan: The Eleventh Striker	Security guard		
2016	Sinbad: Sora Tobu Hime to Himitsu no Shima	Dahl ダール		
2016	Digimon Adventure tri.	Professor Mochizuki		
2017	Lu over the Wall	Takobaba/Granny Octopus		
2022	Laid-Back Camp Movie	Editor-in-chief		
2022	Kaguya-sama: Love Is War – The First Kiss That Never Ends	Narrator		

=== Video games ===
List of voice performances in video games
Year	Title	Role	Notes	Source
2004	Gantz: The 2nd stage	JJ	PS1 / PS2	
2005	Mobile Suit Gundam One Year War ja:機動戦士ガンダム 一年戦争	Cosun Graham コズン・グラハム	PS1 / PS2	
2005	Tales of Commons	Seiun	Mobile phone	
2005	Rogue Galaxy	Jupis Tooki McGanel	PS1 / PS2	
2006	Blue Dragon	Hinnet ヒネット	Xbox 360	
2006	Wild Arms 5	Kartikeya	PS2	
2007	Shoukan Shoujo: Elemental Girl Calling 召喚少女 ～ElementalGirl Calling～	Ben / Ozzy ベン/オジジィ	PS1 / PS2	
2007	Star Ocean: First Departure	Dell Argusy デル・アーガスィ	PSP	
2008	White Knight Chronicles	Amir アミル	PS3	
2010	White Knight Chronicles II	Amir アミル	PS3	
2010	Ishin Renka Ryouma Gaiden 維新恋華 龍馬外伝	Katsu no ki 勝海舟	PSP	
2012	Dragon Age II	Sebastian	PS3, Xbox 360	
2012	Call of Duty: Black Ops 2	Edward Richtofen / Stanley Ferguson エドワード・リヒトーフェン/スタンリー・ファッガーソン	PS3, Xbox 360	
2013	PlayStation All-Stars Battle Royale	Mail · RADEC メール・ラデック	PS3, other	
2013	Sonic Lost World	Zazz	Wii U	
2014	Aizu fighting god Sakaen Hachihisa Tennoyuki ja:相州戦神館學園 八命陣 天之刻	Hyakki karate 百鬼空亡	PS Vita	
2015	Dragon Quest VIII	Savan ザバン	3DS	
2015	Bloodborne: The Old Hunters	Early parish chief Lawrence / Lord of nightmare, Mikolaş 初代教区長ローレンス/悪夢の主、ミコラーシュ	Other; Model, PlayStation 4	
2018	Attack on Titan 2	Narrator / ナレーター	Other; PlayStation 4, Xbox One, Microsoft Windows, and Nintendo Switch	
2020	Xenoblade Chronicles: Definitive Edition	Radzam	Nintendo Switch	
2021	Alchemy Stars	Schwartz	iOS, Android	
2022	Mario + Rabbids Sparks of Hope	Phantom	Nintendo Switch (DLC from Rayman in the Phantom Show)	
2026	Resident Evil Requiem	Victor Gideon		
2026	Fatal Fury: City of the Wolves	Wolfgang Krauser	PlayStation 4, PlayStation 5, Xbox Series X/S and Microsoft Windows	

=== Drama CD ===
List of voice performances in Drama CD
Year	Title	Role	Notes	Source
2010	Oyaji! ~ Case of Chinatsu and Tomoe ~ おやじな！～千夏と巴の場合～	Midorikawa Setsu 緑川セツ		

=== Tokusatsu ===
List of voice performances in film
Year	Title	Role	Notes	Source
1996	B-Fighter Kabuto	Mirage Armored General Beezack 変幻鎧将ビーザック	Ep. 28 - 35, 38, 39, 41 - 45, 47, 48	
1997	Denji Sentai Megaranger	Condor Nejiler コンドルネジラー	Ep. 36	
1999	Kyuukyuu Sentai GoGo-V	Tornado Psyma Beast Tornades 竜巻サイマ獣トルネデウス	Ep. 2	
2000	Mirai Sentai Timeranger	Corrupted Officer Arnold-K 悪徳警察官アーノルドK	Ep. 9	
2000	Star Bows	Narrator		

=== Other dubbing ===
List of voice performances in live-action dubbing
Year	Title	Role	Voice dub for	Notes	Source
1998	Suspiria	Professor Milius, Narrator	Rudolf Schündler		
1998	The Man in the Iron Mask	Pierre	Hugh Laurie		
1999	There's Something About Mary	Dom Woganowski	Chris Elliott		
1999	Dark City	Mr. Hand	Richard O'Brien		
2000	The Thirteenth Floor	Jason Whitney, Jerry Ashton	Vincent D'Onofrio		
2000	Con Air	Garland "The Marietta Mangler" Greene	Steve Buscemi	TV Asahi edition	
2001	Mission: Impossible 2	Hugh Stamp ヒュー・スタンプ	Richard Roxburgh		
2001	Little Nicky	Chubbs	Carl Weathers		
2001	Oz	Kareem Saïd	Eamonn Walker		
2002	A Beautiful Mind	Martin Hansen	Josh Lucas		
2002	Band of Brothers	First Lieutenant Lynn "Buck" Compton	Neal McDonough		
2003	Mr. Deeds	Crazy Eyes	Steve Buscemi		
2003	Charlie's Angel	Thin Man	Crispin Glover	TV Asahi edition	
2003	The Tuxedo	Dietrich Banning	Ritchie Coster		
2003	S.W.A.T.	Officer III Travis Joseph "T.J." McCabe	Josh Charles		
2005	Collateral	Richard Weidner	Peter Berg		
2005	Anacondas: The Hunt for the Blood Orchid	Bill Johnson	Johnny Messner		
2005	The Machinist	Jackson	Lawrence Gilliard Jr.		
2005	Biker Boyz	Soul Train	Orlando Jones		
2006	RoboCop	The Old Man	Dan O'Herlihy		
2006	Licence to Kill	Franz Sanchez	Robert Davi		
2007	Lucky Number Slevin	Detective Brikowski	Stanley Tucci		
2007	When a Stranger Calls	The Stranger	Tommy Flanagan		
2008	I Now Pronounce You Chuck & Larry	Clinton Fitzer	Steve Buscemi		
2008	Wind Chill	Highway Patrolman	Martin Donovan		
2009	Revolutionary Road	John Givings Jr.	Michael Shannon		
2009	The Art of War II: Betrayal	Garret	Lochlyn Munro		
2009	Slumdog Millionaire	Police Inspector	Irrfan Khan		
2010	Mackenna's Gold	John Colorado	Omar Sharif		
2010	Shutter Island	George Noyce	Jackie Earle Haley		
2011	Yogi Bear	Mayor R. Brown	Andy Daly		
2011	Transformers: Dark of the Moon	Dutch	Alan Tudyk		
2011	The Blues Brothers	Elwood Blues	Dan Aykroyd		
2012	The Avengers	Pat Kiernan			
2013	The Chef	Jacky Bonnot	Michaël Youn		
2013	Parental Guidance	Phil Simmons	Tom Everett Scott		
2014	Escape Plan	Willard Hobbes	Jim Caviezel		
2014	Back to the Future	Strickland	James Tolkan		
2014	Dark Blood	Harry	Jonathan Pryce		
2015	Better Call Saul	Nacho Varga	Michael Mando		
2015	True Detective	Francis Semyon	Vince Vaughn		
2015	The Texas Chain Saw Massacre	Nubbins Sawyer	Edwin Neal		
2017	Genius	J. Edgar Hoover	T. R. Knight		
2017	Spider-Man: Homecoming	Mac Gargan	Michael Mando		
2018	Gold	Brian Woolf	Corey Stoll		
2018	Logan Lucky	Joe Bang	Daniel Craig		
2018	Proud Mary	Tom	Billy Brown		
2018	The Man Who Invented Christmas	Signor Mazzini	Cosimo Fusco		
2019	Norman	Rabbi Blumenthal	Steve Buscemi		
2019	Puzzle	Robert	Irrfan Khan		
2019	Dora and the Lost City of Gold	Cole Marquez	Michael Peña		
2020	Just Mercy	Tommy Chapman	Rafe Spall		
2022	Around the World in 80 Days	Thomas Kneedling トーマス・ニードリング	Anthony Flanagan		
2024	Zone 414	Joseph Veidt	Jonathan Aris		
2024	Twisters	Ben	Harry Hadden-Paton		
2026	Until Dawn	Dr. Alan Hill	Peter Stormare		
2026	Marty Supreme	Milton Rockwell	Kevin O'Leary		

List of voice performances in animation dubbing
Year	Title	Role	Notes	Source
2002	Monsters, Inc.	Randall Boggs		
2005	Home on the Range	Wesley		
2006	The Wild	Rally ラリー		
2007	Meet the Robinsons	Spike / Dimitri スパイク/ディミトリ		
2009	Monsters vs. Aliens	Galaxar		
2010	Despicable Me	Fred McDaid フレッド・マクデイド		
2011	Fantastic Mr. Fox	Rat ラット		
2011	Cars 2	Professor Zündapp		
2011	The Smurfs	Raccoon Smurf うぬぼれスマーフ		
2011	Rango	Furgus ファーガス		
2012	The Lorax	Brett / Chet ブレット/チェット		
2013	Wreck-It Ralph	Sour Bill		
2013	Monsters University	Randall Boggs		
2013	Despicable Me 2	Minion Stuart		
2015	Minions	Minion Stuart		
2016	The Good Dinosaur	Bubba ブッバ		
2016	The Secret Life of Pets	Buddy バディ		
2018	Ralph Breaks the Internet	Sour Bill		
2020	The Addams Family	Norman Pickering ノーマン		
2021	Tom & Jerry	Butch ブッチ		
2021	Peter Rabbit 2: The Runaway	Mr. Tod トッド		
