= Misaki (disambiguation) =

Misaki is a collective term for divine spirits in Japan.

Misaki may also refer to:

== Places ==
=== Real places in Japan ===
- Misaki, Chiba, a former town in Chiba Prefecture
- Misaki, Ehime, a former town in Ehime Prefecture
- Misaki, Kanagawa, a port in Miura, Kanagawa Prefecture
- Misaki, Okayama, a town in Okayama Prefecture
- Misaki, Osaka, a town in Osaka Prefecture

=== Fictional ===
- Misaki Town (三咲町), a fictional town in the anime Tsukihime
- Misaki City (御崎市), a fictional town in the anime Shakugan no Shana

== Other uses ==
- Misaki uma, a breed of pony native to Japan
- Misaki (name), a Japanese feminine given name

== See also ==
- Misak (disambiguation)
