= Misumi =

Mi·sumi (Japanese: 三隅, 美隅, 三角, 見角, 三觜; 三栖, 三澄, 満澄, 三須, 美澄, etc.) may refer to:

== Place names ==
- Misumi, Shimane
- Misumi, Yamaguchi
- Misumi-machi (Japanese: 三角·町), a town located in Uto District, Kumamoto, Japan
- Misumi Station
- Misumi Line
- Nagato-Misumi Station
- Miho-Misumi Station (Japanese: 三保·三隅駅)

== People with the given name ==
- Misumi Kubo (窪 美澄; born 1965), Japanese writer
- Misumi Miyauchi (宮内 美澄; born 1971), Japanese tennis player

== People with the surname ==
- Kenji Misumi (Japanese: 三隅 研次)
- Yoko Misumi
- Saichiro Misumi (三角 佐一郎; 1916 - 2018), Japanese indologist

== Fictional characters ==
- Nagisa Misumi (Japanese: 美墨 なぎさ), from Futari wa Pretty Cure
  - Rie Misumi (Japanese: 美墨 理恵), Nagisa's mother
  - Takashi Misumi (Japanese: 美墨 岳), Nagisa's father
  - Ryouta Misumi (Japanese: 美墨 亮太), Nagisa's brother
- Kaede Misumi (Japanese: 水澄 楓)
- Uika Misumi (Japanese: 三角 初華) from BanG Dream!

== Companies ==
- Misumi Group, a Japanese industrial group with global operations
  - MISUMI USA, company part of the Japanese corporation Misumi Group

== See also ==
- Misu
