= Strike the Blood season 1 =

Strike the Blood
- Season 1
- The cover of the first Blu-ray compilation of the first season released by Warner Home Video
- No. of episodes: 24

Release
- Original network: AT-X
- Original release: October 4, 2013 – March 28, 2014

Season chronology
- Next → Strike the Blood II

Strike the Blood is an anime series adapted from the light novel series of the same title written by Gakuto Mikumo with illustrations by Manyako. Produced by Silver Link and Connect, the series is directed by Hideyo Yamamoto with scripts by Hiroyuki Yoshino and character design by Keiichi Sano. The series aired from October 4, 2013, to March 28, 2014, on AT-X. The first opening theme song is "Strike the Blood" (「ストライク・ザ・ブラッド」) by Kisida Kyoudan & The Akebosi Rockets, and the first ending theme song is "Strike my soul" by Yuka Iguchi. The second opening theme is "Fight 4 Real" by Altima and the second ending theme is "Signal" by Kanon Wakeshima. Crunchyroll (with distribution by Discotek Media) released the anime series in a combined Blu-ray/DVD format on November 8, 2016.

On March 15, 2015, publisher Dengeki Bunko announced that a two-part OVA based on an original story by creator Gakuto Mikumo would be released by year's end. On August 14, 2015, further details were announced for Strike the Blood: Valkyria's Kingdom which would be released on DVD/BRD on November 25 and December 23 of that year. The opening theme is "Little Charm Fang" (「リトルチャームファング」) by Iguchi and the ending theme is "Kimi wa Soleil" (「君はソレイユ」) by Wakeshima.

== Episode list ==
No.	Title	Original release date
1	"The Right Arm of the Saint I"; Transliteration: "Seija no Migiude Hen Ichi" (Japanese: 聖者の右腕篇I)	October 4, 2013
Kojo Akatsuki, a high school student living on Itogami Island, is suspected of being a powerful vampire called the Fourth Progenitor. On his way home, he notices a female student trailing him. After an altercation with two local demons, he learns that Yukina Himeragi is an 'attack mage' (攻魔師, koumashi) sent by a secret organization to observe him and the two begin to spend time together.
2	"The Right Arm of the Saint II"; Transliteration: "Seija no Migiude Hen Ni" (Japanese: 聖者の右腕篇II)	October 11, 2013
Yukina is assigned the mission of 'observing' the suspected Fourth Progenitor and armed with a magical polearm named Sekkarou. She moves into the apartment adjacent to Kojo, the better to observe him from. She is exposed to everyday life, which she has heretofore been much sheltered from and is befriended by Kojo's younger sister Nagisa. Explosions and an apparent familiar battle on the East Island causes Yukina to rush to intervene. Rudolf Eustach, a European exorcist who controls the victorious homunculus Astarte, confronts her and they fight. Just as her situation turns dire, Kojo arrives to save her.
3	"The Right Arm of the Saint III"; Transliteration: "Seija no Migiude Hen San" (Japanese: 聖者の右腕篇III)	October 18, 2013
Kojo reveals to Yukina that he has limited control over his own familiars because he has yet to act like a vampire and drink a human's blood. Natsuki Minamiya-sensei meets with Kojo and Yukina and warns Kojo that he may be in danger. After enlisting Asagi Aiba's research assistance, the two investigate an abandoned homunculus research facility. While they explore it, Eustach and Astarte appear and a fight ensues in which Kojo is decapitated. Eustach leaves them to continue his mission.
4	"The Right Arm of the Saint IV"; Transliteration: "Seija no Migiude Hen Yon" (Japanese: 聖者の右腕篇IV)	October 25, 2013
Eustach and Astarte continue their advance to the core of the island's magical foundations. Kojo regenerates and Yukina offers her blood to him, which results in his gaining mastery over a familiar. They pursue Eustach who reveals that his mission is to retrieve a holy relic which is integral to the foundation of the island. With newfound control over the 5th Familiar – Leo Pemptos – Regulus-Aurum/The Lion of Gold, Kojo and Yukina defeat the intruders.
5	"From the Warlord's Empire I"; Transliteration: "Sen'ō no Shisha Hen Ichi" (Japanese: 戦王の使者篇I)	November 1, 2013
Students prepare for the upcoming Saikai Academy ball sports tournament. Therianthropic sympathizers of the Black Death Emperor Faction terrorist organization begin to operate within the city but are thwarted by Natsuki, who discovers that they are interested in an ancient weapon known as Nalakuvera (ナラクヴェーラ). Kojo is attacked by two magical spirits which are easily dispatched by Yukina who now tracks his movements with shikigami. Left behind after the attack is an invitation to a party which they attend that evening aboard the yacht of the newly arrived Lord Ardeal (or Dimitrie Vatler), a powerful vampire representative of the Lost Warlord.
6	"From the Warlord's Empire II"; Transliteration: "Sen'ō no Shisha Hen Ni" (Japanese: 戦王の使者篇II)	November 8, 2013
Sayaka Kirasaka, Yukina's friend from the Lion Kings, makes her feelings known about men in general and Kojo in particular. Vatler discusses the new threat posed by international terrorist Christoph Gardos and his organization. Yukina proposes to deal with this threat herself. Asagi receives and quickly deciphers a decryption puzzle from an unknown source. Kojo and Yukina visit Natsuki in her office, learn that Astarte is now employed as her maid, and discuss Vatler, terrorism, and the ancient weapon known as Nalakuvera. Kojo asks Asagi to research this weapon which she agrees to as its name was the answer to the puzzle she had solved earlier. An enraged Sayaka confronts and assaults Akatsuki atop the school roof.
7	"From the Warlord's Empire III"; Transliteration: "Sen'ō no Shisha Hen San" (Japanese: 戦王の使者篇III)	November 15, 2013
Kojo's surge of power damages the school and injures Asagi. Yukina arrives to end the conflict and brings Asagi to the infirmary. They are joined there by Astarte and Nagisa. Required by Yukina to reflect upon their actions, Sayaka and Kojo instead continue to bicker atop the roof but with her beginning to warm to him. Therianthropic terrorists invade the infirmary, triggering a shrieking panic attack by Nagisa. After terrorist leader Christoph Gardos shoots Astarte, the other three girls are abducted and driven to the airport. Motoki Yase attempts to intervene but is blocked by Vatler who seeks the excitement of a showdown. Gardos reveals his objectives and demands that Asagi decipher the Nalakuvera operations manual.
8	"From the Warlord's Empire IV"; Transliteration: "Sen'ō no Shisha Hen Yon" (Japanese: 戦王の使者篇IV)	November 22, 2013
Kojo battles the Nalakuvera and Sayaka joins the fray. When his familiar drives the Nalakuvera into the ground, it causes an earthquake and the two fall through a fissure to a lower level of the now leaking and unstable float. Asagi works furiously at deciphering the control system for the Nalakuvera. Yukina discovers Gardos' secret – the hold is filled with manufactured Nalakuvera. Gardos appears and fights her. She severs his arm but is prevented from defeating him by the sudden appearance of two more terrorists bearing the unconscious Nagisa and Asagi. Their situation underground bleakens and Sayaka, spurred by Vatler's earlier, offers herself to Kojo, gaining him control of second familiar. Gardos takes the master Nalakuvera and leads the rest into the fight. Initially the ancient weapons seem indestructible but Yukina destroys them all using a special command secretly created by Asagi after decoding their control system.
9	"The Amphisbaena I"; Transliteration: "Tenshi Enjō Hen Ichi" (Japanese: 天使炎上篇I)	November 29, 2013
Asagi lures Kojo into the school's art room to get closer to him without any other women nearby and secure a date for the coming weekend; Yukina observes remotely. While Yukina and Kojo discuss revealing his secret identity to Asagi, they witness Nagisa accepting a letter from a classmate. Sayaka informs Kojo that she will be coming to the island this weekend as a VIP bodyguard. Kojo stalks his sister at school along with Yukina and is introduced to a classmate of hers, the silver-haired Kanon Kanase, who has been collecting feral cats in some nearby church ruins. Natsuki and Motoki discuss the recovering victim from a recent aerial battle and are joined by Vatler who adds to their knowledge of the victim and alerts them to some approaching threats to the city.
10	"The Amphisbaena II"; Transliteration: "Tenshi Enjō Hen Ni" (Japanese: 天使炎上篇II)	December 6, 2013
After Kojo and Yukina accompany Natsuki and Astarte to a festival, they move to the tower where they anticipate another battle between the flying humanoids, who they seek to capture. In combat they discover that their magic is ineffective against the flyers. But when one attacks Kojo, the other silver-haired flyer saves him and brutally assaults the first. While doing so, her mask is destroyed revealing that she is Kanon. Kojo and Yukina visit Magus Craft, the company run by Kanon's father. He is off-site, but his secretary Beatrice has the pair flown to a research island the company owns nearby. The pilot Lowe quickly strands them there. Wondering about Kanon Kanase, Sayaka investigates the church ruins and encounters Motoki, who she recalls seeing with Vatler. They are joined moments later by Nagisa and Asagi and all retire to a nearby internet cafe, where Asagi tracks down the whereabouts of Kojo and Yukina. That night on the island, Kojo searches for Yukina, who had left the shelter, and discovers that they were not alone on the island.
11	"The Amphisbaena III"; Transliteration: "Tenshi Enjō Hen San" (Japanese: 天使炎上篇III)	December 13, 2013
Kojo espies a silver-haired beauty bathing in a moonlit pool, reminding him of a more mature Kanon. A hovercraft approaches the island and beaches. A squad of robot soldiers disembarks and immediately attacks Kojo and Yukina, who are rescued by La Folia Rihavein, the woman Kojo had seen bathing. Kojo destroys the remaining soldiers and their landing craft. Another hovercraft beaches, waving a flag of truce, and Kanon's adoptive father Kensei Kanase greets them, accompanied by Beatrice and Lowe. After revealing their plans and that Kanon is being developed into what Kensei terms an 'angel', a fight breaks out. Kanon's attack seemingly kills Kojo, which disrupts her mental state unpredictably and she creates a tower of ice around herself. Not far from the island, Sayaka assaults and takes control of a Magus Craft container ship and is joined on it by Natsuki.
12	"The Amphisbaena IV"; Transliteration: "Tenshi Enjō Hen Yon" (Japanese: 天使炎上篇IV)	December 20, 2013
Curled up into a ball, Kanon agonizes while encased in ice at the top of her self-imposed barrier. Abutting the tower of ice, Yukina has created a magical shelter for the three. La Folia induces Yukina to arousing and feeding Kojo, enabling a familiar within him to heal the wound from Kanon's attack and return Kojo to consciousness. Inspired by this display, La Folia gives herself to Kojo, gaining him control over a third familiar. Kojo confronts the patiently waiting Kensei. After much bickering, another fight breaks out, this time including additional 'angels' secretly cloned by Beatrice. Kojo defeats Kanon using the familiar Al-Meissa Mercury for the first time.
13	"Labyrinth of the Blue Witch I"; Transliteration: "Aoki Majo no Meikyū Hen Ichi" (Japanese: 蒼き魔女の迷宮篇I)	January 10, 2014
Minamiya-sensei along with Sasasaki, her colleague from the middle school, branch out into working vice on the trains. The two Witches of Ashdown, who are members of the criminal organization known as the Library, invade the island and wreak havoc. Yuuma Tokoyogi, Kojo's tomboyish childhood friend, flies in to visit after four years without contact. Along with his student friends, they take her to the tower of the Keystone Gate (キーストーンゲート) for sightseeing. There are strange occurrences around the city before its annual Halloween Festival. People begin teleporting when they pass through doorways and movement in the city is shut down by traffic mishaps. Astarte arrives at the tower to reveal that Natsuki has vanished and that her orders are to protect Kanon should this happen. That night, Yuuma speaks cryptically and at midnight, kisses Kojo and he falls unconscious. When he wakes, he finds himself in her body, with his own body now missing.
14	"Labyrinth of the Blue Witch II"; Transliteration: "Aoki Majo no Meikyū Hen Ni" (Japanese: 蒼き魔女の迷宮篇II)	January 17, 2014
While in Yuuma's body, Kojo visits Yukina's apartment and proves his identity to her and the others. The island's communications and transportation are in disarray. While Asagi consults with colleague Tank Driver, Mogwai connects the current spatial anomaly to a past crisis known as the Dark Oath Grimoire Incident, perpetrated by the Library a decade ago. Yukina concludes that Yuuma to blame. The Ashdown Witches lurk with a grimoire atop the Keystone Gate tower until interrupted by Vatler. Yuuma arrives in Kojo's body to propose a deal with Vatler over the fate of the criminals imprisoned in the island's magical high security prison and secure his inaction. Asagi solves most of the island's navigational issues and quickly develops a satellite-based navigation system phone app which is sent to Kojo enabling Yukina and he to travel to the tower to confront the witches.
15	"Labyrinth of the Blue Witch III"; Transliteration: "Aoki Majo no Meikyū Hen San" (Japanese: 蒼き魔女の迷宮篇III)	January 24, 2014
Atop the tower, Vatler reveals that the most vicious criminals in the world will all simultaneously be set free and vanishes. In rapid sequence, the witches' familiar grabs Yukina and Kojo, Sayaka and La Folia warp in and free them, Yuuma uses the grimoire to begin bringing the prison to this plane, Kensei steps forward having provided the gateway, Yuuma destroys the grimoire which has served its purpose and vanishes, Kojo and Yukina leave through Kensei's portal to pursue her, and Sayaka and La Folia remain to battle and defeat the Ashdown Witches. Yuuma uses Kojo's familiar to bring the prison fully into this plane and in its antechamber, comes upon its perpetually sleeping jailer, Natsuki. Her spirit guardian Le Bleu appears and attacks the jailer, beginning a battle. Eventually, Yukina drives Sekkarou through Le Bleu and into Yuuma, which results in everyone returning to their own body and Natsuki waking. While they discuss the future, Aya's guardian spirit L'Ombre appears suddenly to spit both Yuuma and Natsuki with its sword.
16	"Fiesta for the Observers I"; Transliteration: "Kansokusha-tachi no Utage Hen Ichi" (Japanese: 観測者たちの宴篇I)	January 31, 2014
Nagisa's body is possessed by the 12th familiar and after delivering a warning to Vatler, returned to her mother Mimori. After waking from her nap, Asagi walks the streets during the festival where she acquires guardianship of a small child who can only be Natsuki. Aya Tokoyogi tears her daughter Yuuma's guardian spirit away from her. Holding up another grimoire, she explains to Kojo and Yukina how she cursed Natsuki, which partially opened the prison. The six worst inmates appear behind her and explain that until they kill the witch, they'll never be free of the prison system and that should their power or stamina fall too low, they will be re-imprisoned automatically. One inmate demonstrates upon another, who is returned. Sayaka races up with a motorized cart and they scoop up the fallen Yuuma and flee. Asagi cares for her new ward who has lost her memories to Aya's curse. Kojo leads the others to his mother's research facility where everyone has fun and Sayaka attempts to seduce Kojo hoping to heal him.
17	"Fiesta for the Observers II"; Transliteration: "Kansokusha-tachi no Utage Hen Ni" (Japanese: 観測者たちの宴篇II)	February 7, 2014
Aya retires to the roof of Saikai Academy to conduct her operations. She severs relations with the Library and marks up the school with magical glyphs. Nurse Witch Yukina explains Mimori's diagnosis and treatment of Yuuma to Kojo and Sayaka. While discussing Natsuki, who they believe can save Yuuma, they notice Asagi with a small child on TV and phone her. The call is interrupted by convict Kirika Girika who has realised that the girl is the young Witch of the Void. With Mogwai's aid, the two escape to an entrance of the Keystone Gate where the Island Guard (アイランドガード) and Astarte return the convict to his cell. Convict Gigliola Ghirardi appears and takes mind control of the Island Guard detachment, subdues Astarte and menaces Asagi and Natsuki-chan. Vatler intervenes and brutally returns her to her cell. Kojo rides up on a stolen folding bike and negotiates handing Natsuki-chan over to Vatler, ostensibly for safekeeping aboard his cruise ship. Convict Meiga Itogami approaches Aya on the school roof where she further explains the situation. His own plans do not include hunting the witch.
18	"Fiesta for the Observers III"; Transliteration: "Kansokusha-tachi no Utage Hen San" (Japanese: 観測者たちの宴篇III)	February 14, 2014
Aboard Vatler's Oceanus Grave, circumstances compel Kojo into the luxurious baths where he is approached with salacious intent by a bevy of young women from the Warlord's domain. They cede the field however when Asagi and Natsuki-chan enter the baths. While bickering, Asagi's towel falls away, exciting Kojo and triggering a nose bleed into the bath and his fainting. Natsuki-chan scoops up some of the discoloured water in her hands. That night in their room the two teens continue to bicker. The sleeping child suddenly stands on the bed and identifying herself as Natsu-kyun, reveals that Natsuki will magically restore herself in two hours. On the quay outside, Vatler approaches Sayaka and Yukina speaking cryptically. Convict Broodt Dumblegraff interrupts and after a long battle, Vatler re-jails him. Convict Shutora D appears and is similarly reincarcerated by Sayaka. Her preparations complete, Aya appears and claims Itogami Island and with the Dark Oath Grimoire (闇誓書事), declares an end to any supernatural powers other than her own. Yukina proves the exception but when she attacking, is teleported into a jail cage.
19	"Fiesta for the Observers IV"; Transliteration: "Kansokusha-tachi no Utage Hen Yon" (Japanese: 観測者たちの宴篇IV)	February 21, 2014
Depositing Yukina into a dreamworld, Aya reveals some of Natsuki's past to her. Yukina continues to dream about a rosy school life shared with Sayaka and Kojo but ends her dream to confront Aya, who reveals that her motivation has been to exculpate witches for all the world's ills that they're traditionally blamed for. She seeks to recruit Yukina to her cause. Yuuma, who as the clone of her mother retains some magical power, joins Sayaka to feed Kojo which heals his wound and restores his power. Kojo interrupts Aya and frees Yukina from her cage. Aya re-releases the worst convicts who are quickly defeated. Yukina shatters Aya's magical barrier but is ensnared by tentacles. Aya pulls out her grimoire to steal Yukina's memories. Awaiting this moment, Natsuki takes the book from Aya and re-acquires her lost time and powers. Although Aya continues to struggle she is finally defeated by Yukina. Convict Meiga collects a prototype anti-demon lance from the museum and decamps for parts unknown.
20	"Return of the Alchemist I"; Transliteration: "Renkinjutsushi no Kikan Hen Ichi" (Japanese: 錬金術師の帰還篇I)	February 28, 2014
Alchemist Kou Amatsuka visits Kensei Kanase, in pursuit of an artefact in his possession known as Wiseman's Blood. The middle school students shop at the mall in advance of their off-island training camp. Accompanying them, Kojo is attacked by Amatsuka who seeks to use Kanon as a sacrifice. Amatsuka comments on an incident at Nina Adelard's monastery, which is apparently also the ruined church and cat haven. Yukina joins the fray and the alchemist departs. Astarte explains alchemists to Kojo and mentions the legendary Nina Adelard, who would be centuries old were she still alive. Kojo and Asagi, approaching the ruined church, are intercepted by Natsuki but while there, Asagi loses a precious ear stud in the grass. Yukina leads Kojo to a seedy part of town where the Lion Kings' island branch is secreted away. She hands in her halberd while her master, in the form of a cat familiar, meets the Fourth Progenitor. At the ruined church, using Wiseman's Blood, Amatsuka conducts a ritual designed to force out his former master Nina. It is successful but she is able to flee. Asagi, returning to search for her ear stud, is struck and perhaps slain.
21	"Return of the Alchemist II"; Transliteration: "Renkinjutsushi no Kikan Hen Ni" (Japanese: 錬金術師の帰還篇II)	March 7, 2014
Kojo and Yukina go to the ruined church where they fight and chase off Amatsuka. Asagi revives, apparently uninjured, but with ruined clothes and somehow still covered in blood. Kojo brings her home. Asagi showers and notices a red disk attached to her chest. She touches it and her body is taken over by the alchemist Nina Adelard. During a long conversation with Kojo, she reveals that Amatsuka remains alive. Amatsuka meanwhile, wanders around the island picking fights.
22	"Return of the Alchemist III"; Transliteration: "Renkinjutsushi no Kikan Hen San" (Japanese: 錬金術師の帰還篇III)	March 14, 2014
Aboard the ferry, Amatsuka does bad things. Nina and Kojo visit the ruined church where she partially restores herself from the remaining fragments of Wiseman's blood left after the ritual. The cat and the maid send them off with Yukina's halberd, along with Sayaka and Natsuki, aboard an Aldegyr royal airship, which was borrowed through La Folia. Cornered, Kanon faces Amatsuka and tells him truths he cannot endure. Yukina blocks his attack and Kojo then arrives along with Nina. Amatsuka takes out Wiseman's brilliant, golden skull and tosses it onto the deck where Wiseman begins to re-form, pulling the necessary matter from seawater. After achieving the perfect form of a golden giant, he launches an attack. In the aftermath, Nina is reduced to half her form, and Kojo is solid metal. Nagisa's body, possessed again by Avrora, kisses Kojo feeding him enough power to return to his normal state whereupon Yukina feeds herself to him. His powers restored, Kojo's familiar destroys Wiseman. This frees Nina although there is insufficient blood remaining for her to restore her to her normal size.
23	"Empire of the Dawn I"; Transliteration: "Akatsuki no Teikoku Hen Ichi" (Japanese: 暁の帝国篇I)	March 21, 2014
Yukina suffers through terrible dreams of abandonment. Later that day, like a terminator, a naked young woman appears amidst a sphere of surging, crackling electricitcy in the girls' dressing room. She strikes Yukina knocking her out and steals her clothes. Outside, Kojo and Motoki have a confused conversation with a blue-eyed girl who they treat as though she is Yukina due to an uncanny resemblance. A dragon-like monster appears, vanishes and appears again above the school. It attacks Kojo, draining some of his energy. Yukina attacks the dragon and completely shatters her halberd's blade against it. The blue-eyed Yukina's eyes turn red. She summons her own golden, Lovecraftian halberd and attacks the dragon, causing it to teleport away. Natsuki, who calls the blue-eyed Yukina the 'fake transfer student', discovers something unusual about her and leads her away from any scrutiny. A crushing letter arrives from the Lion Kings recalling Yukina to the High God Forest (高神の杜).
24	"Empire of the Dawn II"; Transliteration: "Akatsuki no Teikoku Hen Ni" (Japanese: 暁の帝国篇II)	March 28, 2014
While bathing at Kanon's the blue-eyed Yukina explains to her and Nina that she's here to stop a manmade magical beast that can cross time, distort space and consumes dragon veins. In short order, it will destroy the island. Asagi works furiously but fruitlessly to maintain the island's infrastructure. Sayaka informs Kojo of Vatler's opinion on the dragon's significance. Yukina is too despondent to even listen. The fake transfer girl confronts Yukina who eventually expresses her great desire to remain with Kojo, and gives her a replacement Sekkarou, this one twenty years in the making and capable of handling the great power that Yukina has developed since leaving the nest. Returning to battle together with the now red-eyed girl, they cross the streams and disable its ability to drain energy, opening it up to Kojo's final attack. Instantly, the sun shines again and everything returns to normal. In a maelstrom of electrical energy, the fake transfer girl returns home, twenty years in the future, and tells her half-sister about meeting her parents when they were her age.
OVA–1	"Kingdom of the Valkyria I"; Transliteration: "Varukyuria no Ōkoku Zenpen" (Japanese: ヴァルキュリアの王国 前篇)	November 25, 2015
A renewal of the non-aggression treaty between the Kingdom of Aldegyr and the Warlord's Empire is scheduled to be signed in the acceptably neutral Itogami City. King Lucas' misgivings about La Folia's relationship with the Fourth Progenitor result in him pressuring his daughter to quickly get engaged to someone. The Rihavein's host a large event that night and everyone is invited. Giant, flying, demon bugs crash the party and menace the attendees. Kojo obliterates the insects and then comforts an apparent victim, a maid from the event. Licking Kojo's chest in gratitude the maid runs off. Thereafter that night, Kojo acts strangely and is more forward with his female friends than usual. His will having abandoned him and at the behest of the now-domineering maid, Kojo abducts La Folia and Yukina.
OVA–2	"Kingdom of the Valkyria II"; Transliteration: "Varukyuria no Ōkoku Kouhen" (Japanese: ヴァルキュリアの王国 後篇)	December 23, 2015
Lucas and Polifonia discuss the abduction with security. Meanwhile, with the two abductees bound and gagged nearby, erstwhile maid and now full-time terrorist Trine Harden discusses their plans while humiliating Kojo. The world is oblivous to the abduction which is kept from the public. On the day of the ceremony, at Trine's command, Kojo boards and takes over the Aldegyrian flagship, the Bifröst. La Folia is ordered to give control of the airship to the terrorists, who she identifies as being agents from the North Sea Empire (北海帝国). Playing along, she does so and the two captives are returned to their cabin where La Folia turns up the heat. Asagi begins taking over the systems of the Bifröst. The terrorists launch attacks at the ceremonial hall, but are thwarted each time. La Folia identifies the nature of Trine's hold over Kojo and highlights Yukina's charms to free him. Together, he and Yukina defeat the terrorists.
