= Misak =

Misak may refer to:

- Misak people or Guambiano, an indigenous people of Colombia
- Misak language or Guambiano, a language of Colombia
- Misak, an Armenian given name, equivalent to Meshach; notable people with the name include:
  - Misak Metsarents (1886–1908), Armenian neo-romantic poet
  - Missak Manouchian (1906–1944), French-Armenian poet and communist activist
  - Misak Terzibasiyan (born 1964), Dutch architect
  - Anahit Misak "Ana" Kasparian (born 1986), Armenian-American media host and journalist
- Mišak, a surname (including a list of people with the name)

== See also ==
- Misaki (disambiguation)
