= McMaster-Carr =

American industrial supply company

- Type: Private
- Industry: Industrial supply
- Founded: 1901; 125 years ago
- Headquarters: Elmhurst, Illinois
- Number of employees: 3,001
- Website: www.mcmaster.com

McMaster-Carr Supply Company is a private American supplier of hardware, tools, raw materials, industrial materials, and maintenance equipment. They function as a business-to-business company. The company was founded in 1901 and is based in Elmhurst, Illinois, with distribution centers in Robbinsville Township, New Jersey; Santa Fe Springs, California; Douglasville, Georgia and Aurora, Ohio. A new distribution center and regional headquarters began construction in June 2025 in Fort Worth, Texas, with completion expected in 2027.

== History ==
The company was founded in 1901 at 160 East Lake street in Chicago as the McMaster-Davis Supply Company. Starting with $50,000 in investor capital, its founders were T.J. McMaster, a former stationary engineer, and F.C. Davis, who had been a chief engineer in the U.S. Navy. In 1904, an attorney with a background in mechanical engineering named Walter S. Carr purchased the company. As early as 1908, the name of the company had been changed from McMaster-Davis to McMaster-Carr.

Harry and James Channon, the sons of Henry Channon the founder of the H. Channon company, a large Chicago distributor of maritime and steam engine supplies, later purchased the company.

== Catalog ==
In 1908 the company printed and copyrighted its first catalog, at 506 pages in length. It releases its current catalog annually.

== See also ==
- MSC Industrial Direct
- Grainger
- MISUMI USA
