= Mišak =

Mišak is a surname. Notable people with the surname include:

- Iva Mišak (born 1993), Croatian alpine skier
- Krešimir Mišak (born 1972), Croatian journalist, musician, and author
- Patrik Mišák (born 1991), Slovak footballer

== See also ==
- Misak (disambiguation)
