= Strike the Blood IV =

- The cover of the first Blu-ray compilation of the fourth season released by Warner Home Video.
- No. of episodes: 12

Release
- Original release: April 8, 2020 – June 30, 2021

Season chronology
- ← Previous; Strike the Blood III Next → Strike the Blood Final

Strike the Blood is an anime series adapted from the light novel series of the same title written by Gakuto Mikumo with illustrations by Manyako. The fourth OVA series, projected at 12 episodes, debuted on April 8, 2020, and concluded on June 30, 2021. The opening theme is "Akatsuki no Kaleido Blood" by Kishida Kyōdan & The Akeboshi Rockets while the ending theme is "Dear My Hero" by Taneda. The staff from the third OVA series returned to reprise their roles. On May 15, 2020, it was announced that volume 2 was pushed back from June 24 to July 29 due to the COVID-19 pandemic.

== Episode list ==
No.	Title	Original release date
OVA 1 (43)	"Paladiness of Mirage I"; Transliteration: "Kagerō no hijiri kishi-hen I" (Japanese: 陽炎の聖騎士篇I)	April 8, 2020
OVA 2 (44)	"Paladiness of Mirage II"; Transliteration: "Kagerō no hijiri kishi-hen II" (Japanese: 陽炎の聖騎士篇II)	April 8, 2020
OVA 3 (45)	"Paladiness of Mirage III"; Transliteration: "Kagerō no hijiri kishi-hen III" (Japanese: 陽炎の聖騎士篇III)	July 29, 2020
OVA 4 (46)	"Tournament in the Nightmare Night I"; Transliteration: "Owaranai yoru no utage-hen I" (Japanese: 終わらない夜の宴篇I)	July 29, 2020
OVA 5 (47)	"Tournament in the Nightmare Night II"; Transliteration: "Owaranai yoru no utage-hen II" (Japanese: 終わらない夜の宴篇II)	September 30, 2020
OVA 6 (48)	"Tournament in the Nightmare Night III"; Transliteration: "Owaranai yoru no utage-hen III" (Japanese: 終わらない夜の宴篇III)	September 30, 2020
OVA 7 (49)	"Reunion of Vampire Princess I"; Transliteration: "Saikai no kyūketsu hime-hen I" (Japanese: 再会の吸血姫篇I)	December 23, 2020
OVA 8 (50)	"Reunion of Vampire Princess II"; Transliteration: "Saikai no kyūketsu hime-hen II" (Japanese: 再会の吸血姫篇II)	December 23, 2020
OVA 9 (51)	"Reunion of Vampire Princess III"; Transliteration: "Saikai no kyūketsu hime-hen III" (Japanese: 再会の吸血姫篇III)	March 24, 2021
OVA 10 (52)	"Seize the Twelve Beast Vassals I"; Transliteration: "Jū ni no kemono to chi no jūsha ta hen I" (Japanese: 十二眷獣と血の従者たち篇I)	March 24, 2021
OVA 11 (53)	"Seize the Twelve Beast Vassals II"; Transliteration: "Jū ni no kemono to chi no jūsha ta hen II" (Japanese: 十二眷獣と血の従者たち篇II)	June 30, 2021
OVA 12 (54)	"Seize the Twelve Beast Vassals III"; Transliteration: "Jū ni no kemono to chi no jūsha ta hen III" (Japanese: 十二眷獣と血の従者たち篇III)	June 30, 2021
