= Strike the Blood II =

- The cover of the first Blu-ray compilation of the second season released by Warner Home Video.
- No. of episodes: 8

Release
- Original release: November 23, 2016 – May 24, 2017

Season chronology
- ← Previous; Strike the Blood Next → Strike the Blood III

Strike the Blood is an anime series adapted from the light novel series of the same title written by Gakuto Mikumo with illustrations by Manyako. The second OVA series based on the 9th light novel, co-produced by Silver Link and Connect and with returning director Hideyo Yamamoto, was released between November 21, 2016, and May 24, 2017. The opening theme song is "Blood on the EDGE" by Kishida Kyōdan & The Akeboshi Rockets and the ending theme song is "Fortune Number 0405" (「フォーチュンナンバー0405」) by Risa Taneda.

== Episode list ==
No.	Title	Original release date
OVA 1 (25)	"Swords-Shaman of Shadow I"; Transliteration: "Kuro no Ken'nagi-hen I" (Japanese: 黒の剣巫篇I)	November 23, 2016
Blue Elysium (ブルーエリジアム), a new fantasy marine resort, is holding its trial opening and Motoki wants the gang there. Kojo and Asagi end up working a yakisoba booth while Yukina and Nagisa see the sights. Elsewhere on the grounds, Sayaka rescues Yume Eguchi, a younger girl abductee but after giving the girl a photo of Kojo and sending her ahead to the lifeguard centre, is herself taken prisoner by a mysterious sword shaman. By the aquarium, Yukina encounters a schoolgirl in black who carries a case similar to Yukina's over her shoulder. When Kojo delivers drinks to the lifeguard centre, Yume follows him back to the booth and eventually to the suites where a barbecue gets underway. Yume reveals that her sister Riru was also confined and that an organization is conducting experiments for which her sister had been a willing subject. There is a connection to the ownership of the new resort. The same girl observing Yukina earlier also captured Sayaka, and held a cryptic conversation with Kazuomi Kusuki, who runs the company that Yume discussed. She identifies herself to Sayaka as a shadow of a sword shaman.
OVA 2 (26)	"Swords-Shaman of Shadow II"; Transliteration: "Kuro no Ken'nagi-hen II" (Japanese: 黒の剣巫篇II)	November 23, 2016
Kiriha Kisaki, who works for the Taishikyoku, an agency similar to and in competition with the Lion Kings, offers to release Sayaka once her mission is complete. Until then Sayaka will be put to work. Kojo discovers that Yume is a succubus demon, and her ostensible sister Riru is actually her own alter ego, concocted to cope with past trauma. The others all rise under her mischievous control and make advances upon Kojo. Later, Kiriha arrives with a controlled Sayaka, who is left behind to pick a fight while she drives off with Yume. Kojo battles Sayaka and soon brings her around. Yukina, seeking to rescue Yume, chases down and battles Kiriha. Yume's personality reseizes control and she flies away, distraught. Sayaka and Asagi reveal the villainous plans of Kazuomi. A control program called LYL based upon Yume, who will be sacrificed, and the spirit of the persistent succubus Lilith, will enable their control over the ancient sea monster Leviathan and destroy Itogami Island. Kojo and Yukina join Sayaka to thwart the terrorists.
OVA 3 (27)	"Swords-Shaman of Shadow III"; Transliteration: "Kuro no Ken'nagi-hen III" (Japanese: 黒の剣巫篇III)	December 23, 2016
While Asagi investigates, she is interrupted by Lydianne Didier, who reveals that she is working for the Taishikyoku, managing the LYL program and will protect their systems against all comers. She challenges Asagi to hacking combat and begins her attack. Lilith's spirit awakens early and automatically, contrary to Kazuomi's schemes. Yume, now apparently hosting that spirit, informs Kazuomi that he will be the actual sacrifice. Kiriha intervenes when Kojo attempts to steal a powerboat. Sayaka, smarting from her earlier defeat, remains behind to battle her. Before her defeat, Kiriha identifies Asagi as the Priestess of Cain, the assassination of whom is the Taishikyoku's goal. Kojo and Yukina race off to face Leviathan. After entering the belly of the beast, Kojo confronts Yume and wins her over with his promise to make her happy forever. The sea monster um… reboots, shucking off all controlling efforts and begins to lash out. Battling through her impressive right cross, Kojo persuades Yukina to feed him and gains control of another familiar Kiffa-Ater, which possesses the form of a Damascene sword. Yume sings to the beast and quickly calms it.
OVA 4 (28)	"The 4th Primogenitor on the run I"; Transliteration: "Tōbō no Dai yon Shinso-hen I" (Japanese: 逃亡の第四真祖篇I)	December 23, 2016
Yukina stalks Kojo as he plays with Yume. A stranger approaches and while chatting her up, half-jokingly accuses her of stalking. He is Gajou, the father of Kojo and Nagisa. Soon after, he leaves the island with Nagisa. On New Year's Eve, Yukina exploits Nagisa's absence to play house with Kojo in his apartment. Motoki arrives with Yume, Kanon, Astarte and Asagi and all visit the temple together. A cryptic message from Nagisa arrives with only a photo of a magic circle in the sky, which Yukina concludes was Sayaka's. At home, Asagi scans through CCTV footage to determine the route and destination of Gajou and Nagisa. As more information comes to light, Yukina concludes that the Lion Kings are involved. With Kojo chasing her, she rushes to the local office but it is silent, empty and locked down. Kiriha intrudes upon them. Asagi decides to travel to the mainland, which provokes a vigorous reaction from the island. Kojo visits Natsuki and asks for her assistance in getting off the island but she first declines to help and then forbids his leaving for Lake Kannawa.
OVA 5 (29)	"The 4th Primogenitor on the run II"; Transliteration: "Tōbō no Dai yon Shinso-hen II" (Japanese: 逃亡の第四真祖篇II)	March 29, 2017
Natsuki magically prevents Kojo from leaving her premises. Kanon recruits Nina to spring him. Outside, Kiriha offers Yukina and him a private jet and false travel documents. Her agency is having fun at the expense of the rival Lion Kings. Asagi continues her efforts to leave the island with Mogwai's aid. Lydianne assists, and later the convict Meiga. Eventually she leaves the island by plane. Natsuki intercepts Kojo by the beach to forcibly stop him. Her guardian spirit Rheingold suppresses his familiars and drains his power through them. Kanon teleports with him into Natsuki's prison antechamber where they encounter an adult version of her who explains that Avrora, through Nagisa, is capable of permanently sealing a great monster at the lake but Kojo's presence there would be disruptive. Astarte rebels and prods Kanon into giving herself to Kojo, gaining him control of another familiar, Mesarthim-Adamas, the Ram. Kiriha joins Yukina in battling Natsuki. Yukina goes all out using divine possession to dismiss Rheingold and free Kojo's familiars. Natsuki then ends their conflict, permits him to go to the mainland and departs. Koyomi appears suddenly and after introducing herself, places a seal upon him.
OVA 6 (30)	"Knight of the Sinful God I"; Transliteration: "Kyūshin no Kishi-hen I" (Japanese: 咎神の騎士篇I)	March 29, 2017
Gajou and Nagisa arrive at the temple at Lake Kannawa. He is captured and his jailers are two Lion King miko, Yuiri Haba and Shio Hikawa. Plans for dealing with the sealing relic known as 'Avalon' are discussed. Shirona Kuraki of the Lion Kings will conduct the ritual involving Nagisa, supported by Yuiri. A side-effect of the ritual will permanently expunge the remnant of Avrora from Nagisa. Major Azama commands the JDSF anti-mage contingent. The ritual quickly goes awry as they discover that Avalon is not actually a seal but rather, an independent being which is using the ritual to free itself. While it launches hundreds of giant demonic winged insects which quickly fly amok, Avrora's familiar Alrescha-Glacies manifests and freezes the lake and adjoining river. A battle ensues between the poorly equipped soldiers and the demon insects. With Azama missing and presumed dead, Lt. Okiyama assumes command of the remaining soldiers. Gajou and Shio cross the frozen lake and retrieve the unconscious Nagisa. Elsewhere, Yuiri comes to and notices the demons flying off in a fright. A naked girl approaches her.
OVA 7 (31)	"Knight of the Sinful God II"; Transliteration: "Kyūshin no Kishi-hen II" (Japanese: 咎神の騎士篇II)	May 24, 2017
Myriad forces continue to converge on the frozen Lake Kannawa. Asagi and Lydianne, riding in the pink tank, are joined by Ibliss, a high-ranking vampire from the Warlord's domain, after he rescued them from flying demons. Gajou and Shio carry the comatose Nagisa across the frozen lake, seeking a haven for her. Hisano instructs Yuiri to care for Glenda and evacuate with the wounded soldiers. In separate actions, a wyvern-mounted knight attempts to abduct Nagisa and Glenda. They're identified as cultist Knights of the Sinful God, and their efforts are stymied, one by Vatler and Ibliss, the other by Kojo and Yukina. Separately and shortly after, two squads of soldiers, led respectively by the back-in-action Azama and Ueyanagi of the JDSF, confront the two parties and demand that they hand over their charges, Nagisa and Glenda. Stand-offs ensue.
OVA 8 (32)	"Knight of the Sinful God III"; Transliteration: "Kyūshin no Kishi-hen III" (Japanese: 咎神の騎士篇III)	May 24, 2017
Shio defies Azama. From afar, Shirona incapacitates the lower level cultists. Okiyama appears on a wyvern and leading a second one to retrieve Azama and they flee. Azama joins the other confrontation and first betrays Ueyanagi, transforming him into a golem, and then attacking Yuiri, triggering a distraught Glenda to transform and fly off with Yuiri, Kojo and Yukina. After fleeing the confrontation with Azama, Kojo, Yukina, Yuiri and Glenda enjoy a pleasant interlude in a cabin in the mountains. Azama arrives and explains the cult's beliefs and intentions, including their plans to rid the world of its demons and then make an offer to Kojo. When rejected, he banishes Kojo to the void of Node where Kojo is protected by the seal placed on him earlier by Koyomi. Glenda leaps after him into the void and offers herself, gaining him control over the second familiar. He frees himself from the void and returns to help defeat Azama and the cult. During the battle, Asagi learns at last that Kojo is the Fourth Progenitor.
