= Misako =

- Gender: Female

Origin
- Word/name: Japanese
- Meaning: Different meanings depending on the kanji used

Misako (みさこ, ミサコ) is a feminine Japanese given name. It can have many different meaning depending on the kanji characters used and may also be written using the hiragana and katakana writing systems. Different variations include these listed below.

== Written forms ==
Forms in kanji can include:

- 美沙子, "beauty, fine sand, child"
- 海沙子, "sea, fine sand, child"
- 巳砂子, "sign of the snake, sand, child"
- 実冴子, "truth, serene, skillful, child"
- 美咲子, "beauty, blossom, child"
- 魅佐子, "fascination, help, child"

== People ==
- Misako Ando (安藤 美佐子; born 1971), softball player
- Misako Aoki (青木 美沙子; born 1983), nurse, model, and lolita fashion president
- Misako Enoki (榎 美沙子; born 1945), feminist, pharmacist, and politician
- Misako Katayama (片山 美佐子; born 1944), javelin thrower
- Misako Konno (紺野 美沙子; born 1960), actress and essayist
- Misako Miyahara (宮原 美佐子; born 1962), long-distance runner
- Misako Odani (小谷 美紗子; born 1976), singer, songwriter and pianist
- Misako Renbutsu (蓮佛 美沙子; born 1991), actress
- Misako Satake (佐竹 美佐子; born 1951), women's basketball player
- Misako Suzuki (鈴木 美早子; born 1985), member of Japanese rock group Shinsei Kamattechan
- Misako Takashima (高嶋 美沙子; born 1977), manga artist, writer and illustrator
- Misako Tamura (田村 美佐子; born 1934), swimmer
- Misako Tanaka (田中 美佐子; born 1959), actress
- Misako Uno (宇野 実彩子; born 1986), Tarento, artist, actress, essayist and talent agent
- Misako Wakamiya (若宮 三紗子; born 1989), table tennis player
- Misako Watanabe (渡辺 美佐子; born 1932), actress
- Misako Yasuda (安田 美沙子; born 1982), actress and former gravure idol
- Misako Yasui (安井 美沙子; born 1965), politician

== Fictional characters ==
- Misako (Ninjago), a character in Ninjago
- Misako Kurata (倉田 美紗子), a character in the manga series Kodocha
- Misako Tōgane (東金 美沙子), a character in the anime series Psycho-Pass
