= Misaki Amano =

Women's football goalkeeper and coach

Personal information
- Full name: Misaki Amano
- Date of birth: 22 April 1985 (age 41)
- Place of birth: Gifu, Japan
- Height: 1.73 m (5 ft 8 in)
- Position: Goalkeeper

Team information
- Current team: Urawa Red Diamonds

Youth career
- Tokiwagi Gakuen High School LSC

College career
Years	Team	Apps	(Gls)
2004–2007	Waseda University		

Senior career*
Years	Team	Apps	(Gls)
2008–2011	TEPCO Mareeze		
2012–2013	Vegalta Sendai		
2022–2023	Urawa Red Diamonds		

Managerial career
- 2022–: Urawa Red Diamonds (GK coach)
- * Club domestic league appearances and goals

Misaki Amano (天野 実咲, Amano Misaki; born 22 April 1985) is a former professional football goalkeeper and goalkeeping coach for Urawa Red Diamonds of the Japanese top-division WE League. She was also a professional goalkeeper for TEPCO Mareeze and Vegalta Sendai of the top-division Nadeshiko League, and was a member of the Japan women's national football team's 2007 FIFA Women's World Cup squad.

== Early life ==
Amano was born in Gifu Prefecture and graduated from Tokiwagi Gakuen High School. She attended Waseda University from 2004 to 2008 and played for its football club, converting from being a field player to goalkeeper in her sophomore year in which Waseda won the intercollegiate championship. In 2007, Japan Football Association selected Amano for its special designated player program, allowing her to play with Urawa Red Diamonds in the top-division Nadeshiko League.

== Club career ==
=== TEPCO Mareeze, 2008–2011 ===
After graduating from Waseda University in 2008 with a degree in sports sciences, Amano joined Nadeshiko League club TEPCO Mareeze in 2008.

Amano started for TEPCO Mareeze against Women's Professional Soccer club FC Gold Pride of the United States in a 2010 club friendly.

The club was disbanded after the Fukushima nuclear disaster in 2011; TEPCO was the company that had managed the nuclear power plant, and all of the players were TEPCO employees. In January 2012 the new club Vegalta Sendai was created to accommodate the displaced players. She contemplated retirement following the accident and declined offers to join other clubs until learning that the team's flag was still intact in a yakitori restaurant in the afflicted town of Hirono.

=== Vegalta Sendai, 2012–2013 ===
In 2012, Amano moved to Vegalta Sendai, which began competition in the second-division Challenge League. She was the club's starting goalkeeper. The club won the league in 2012 with a 12–0–2 record and earned promotion to the top-division Nadeshiko League. Amano continued playing for the promoted team but retired after the 2013 season.

=== Urawa Reds, 2022–2023 ===
Amano was available off the bench as a player for Urawa Red Diamonds for their 2022 Empress's Cup match against INAC Kobe Leonessa, wearing shirt number 33. She announced her second retirement as a player on 1 February 2023.

== International career ==
Amano was selected to the Japan women's national football team for the 2007 FIFA Women's World Cup. She traveled with the team and was named to group-stage matchday rosters against Germany, Argentina, and England as a reserve goalkeeper for the starter Miho Fukumoto, but did not play.

While playing for Vegalta Sendai, the Japan national team called Amano into national team training camp on 10 February 2012, then again from 26 March to 30 March 2012, as a third keeper. The national team called her into camp again in June 2012 and to the preliminary 2012 Summer Olympics roster following the camp. Her final national team call-ups were as a reserve goalkeeper for Japan's June 2013 friendly series against New Zealand (20 June) and Germany (29 June).

== Managerial career ==
From March 2016 to January 2018, Amano served as Jumonji Gakuen Women's University football club's goalkeeping coach. She also served as the affiliated Jumonji High School club's coach in 2017, leading them to their first championship. She then served from 2018 to 2020 as goalkeeping coach for Tokyo International University's women's football club.

On 6 October 2022, Urawa Red Diamonds, now playing in the top-division WE League, hired Amano as a goalkeeping coach. She announced her retirement from the role on 1 February 2023.
