= Misaki Wayengera =

Ugandan physician, academician, and medical researcher

- Born: 15 October 1979 (age 46); Mbale Hospital, Uganda
- Citizenship: Uganda
- Education: Makerere University (Bachelor of Medicine and Human Surgery), University of Toronto (Post Graduate Certificate in Bioentreprenuership), Makerere University (Master of Science in Immunology), Emory University (Post Graduate Certificate in Research Diagnostics Development), National Human Genome Research Institute (Post-doctoral fellowship in Human Genetics & Genomics), (Joint PhD in Pathogen Omics); Makerere University; Yale University, National Institute for Communicable Diseases (Post-doctoral in Filovirology)
- Occupations: Physician, researcher, academic administrator
- Years active: 2004–present
- Known for: Medical research, academic administration

Misaki Wayengera is a Ugandan physician, academician, and a medical researcher. He serves as a lecturer for Pathology, Immunology and Molecular Biology at Makerere University College of Health Sciences. He is the chairperson of Uganda's Scientific Advisory Committee on COVID-19 for the Ministry of Health and the National Task Force.

== Background ==
He was born on 15 October 1979 at Mbale Hospital, in Mbale District.

== Education ==
Misaki was educated at North Road Primary School in Mbale District from 1987 to 1992, he joined Nabumali High School for UCE (1993-1996), he attended King's College Budo for UACE (1997-1998). In 1999, Wayengera entered the Makerere University School of Medicine where he obtained the Bachelor of Medicine and Human Surgery graduating in 2004, he went on to obtain the Master of Medicine degree specializing in Immunology also from Makerere in 2013. He later obtained a joint PhD degree in Pathogenomics from Makerere and Yale University in 2018. He his a fellow of Human Genetics & Genomics since 2017 from the National Human Genome Research Institute. Following completion of his medical studies in 2004, Wayengera went for a bio-entrepreneurship training at the Medical and Related Sciences (MaRs) Discovery District at the University of Toronto Misaki has obtained several post graduate certificates such as a Certificate in Bioentreprenuership from University of Toronto, Certificate in Vaccinology from Oxford University (2014), Certificate in Research and Diagnostics Development from Emory University (2017), a post Doc in Filovirogy from the National Institute for Communicable Diseases, South Africa (2019). He has special training in Immunology, Vaccinology, Clinical Microbiology, Filovirology and Genetics.

== Work experience ==
Wayengera started as an intern doctor at Mulago Hospital in 2004, and has worked as a Researcher assistant at Makerere University Retreatment TB Project (2004-2007), as an assistant lecturer of Genetics in the Department of Pathology at Makerere University School of Medicine (2007-2014), as a company Director at Restrizymes Biotherapeutics Uganda Limited in Kampala (2008-2020), as Ex-Chairperson for Education and Coordinated Training Working Group (ECTWG)- H3Africa Consortium (2013-2016), as Lecturer for Genetics & Genomics Deptment of Pathology at Makerere University College of Health Sciences since 2014. In 2013, he won a $100,000 grant from Grand Challenges Canada to create the Pan-Filovirus Rapid Diagnostic Test, a paper-strip test used in detecting Ebola and Marburg viruses. He is a researcher and inventor of the Pan-Filovirus Rapid Diagnostic Test (Pan-filo-V RDT). In 2014, when the Ebola epidemic broke out in West Africa, Wayengera and his team were very pivotal in its control. He served as In-charge of Unit of Genetics & Genomics (a specialized referral centre for children and adults born with rare Mendelian diseases at Mulago Hospital. He is the chairperson of Uganda's Scientific Advisory Committee on COVID-19 for the Ministry of Health and the National Task Force.

== Research ==
He has published the finding of his research on pathogen OMICS:- with a focus on identifying new molecular targets for research and development of diagnostics, therapeutics and vaccines in medical journals and other peer publications hence cited with an H-Index of 36 with 321 citations in over 120 peer-reviewed journal in scientific publications.

== Awards ==
In 2015, he was listed 57 out of 100 most influential Africans (Science & Technology Track), in the New African Magazine. In 2019, he was among the 30 finalists of the World Health Organization Innovation Challenge.

== Committee memberships ==
Wayengera is a member of various organisations such as

- Member at Association of Pathologists of East, Central and Southern Africa-APECSA
- Member of International AIDS Society (IAS)
- Member of Alliance for Microbicide Development
- Member of African Society for Human Genetics (AfSHG)
- Member of YECI-Steering Committee, Global HIV vaccine Enterprise
- Member of IAS “Towards an HIV cure” group
- Member of H3Africa Consortium (funded by NIH, Wellcome Trust)
- Member of the 50 Scientists’ Advisory Committee for the African Network for New Diagnostic Innovation (ANDI) Pre-Symposium to the African Union Heads of State meeting on Ebola and other disease Technologies.
