= Misumi USA =

American distributor of industrial components

- Industry: Manufacturing
- Founded: February 1988; 38 years ago
- Headquarters: Schaumburg, United States
- Website: www.misumiusa.com

Misumi USA is a subsidiary of Misumi Corporation, established in February 1988. Misumi USA is known for providing fixed and configurable components for the manufacturing industry and is headquartered in Schaumburg, Illinois.

== History ==
Misumi Corporation was founded in 1963 under the name Misumi Shoji Co., Ltd. In the early years of its founding, the company focused primarily on the sale of electronic equipment and bearings, as well as press die components.

Throughout its first 25 years, Misumi Corp continued to establish regional presences across Japan. To better serve the American market, Misumi Corp established a subsidiary, Misumi USA, in February 1988.

MISUMI Group Inc. was established in 1963. It divides global operations into Europe, Asia, Japan, and North America.

In April, 2025, Misumi acquired Fictiv, a California-based contract manufacturer and supply chain technology company.

== Current business model ==
As of February 2014, Misumi USA supplies over 20.7 million different configurable components for assembly automation in the automotive, appliance, semiconductor, medical, and packaging industries, with over 30,000 products available for same-day shipping. Misumi USA is known for its QCT (Quality, Cost, Time) model, fulfilled by catalog sales of standardized products, along with piece-by-piece production of customizable products. Misumi has operated under the leadership of Co-CEOs Tadashi Saegusa and Masayuki Takaya since June 2002.

In November 2017, Misumi announced plans to expand manufacturing and distribution in North America through the creation of a subsidiary in Querétaro City, Querétaro, Mexico.

== Environmental and social contributions ==
Misumi's products are compliant with the European Union’s RoHS Directive, restricting the use of hazardous substances. As innovations in green production, Misumi has developed equipment cables with superior oil and heat resistance, as well as combined terminal blocks and components. As part of a green procurement initiative, Misumi also mandates that its suppliers comply with a strict set of guidelines, including a chemical substances survey and report. In January 2014, MISUMI embarked on an initiative to enhance workplace safety by introducing a new nitrogen gas spring to the North American market.

== See also ==
- MSC Industrial Direct
- Grainger
- McMaster-Carr
