= Misato (surname) =

Misato (written: 美里 or 美郷) is a Japanese surname. Notable people with the surname include:

- Aki Misato (美郷 あき, born 1981), Japanese singer
- Misato Anman (美里 親方 安満, 1669–1744), Ryukyuan politician and bureaucrat
- Misato Chōtei (美里 王子 朝禎, 1682–1711), Ryukyuan prince
