= Strike the Blood Final =

- The cover of the first Blu-ray compilation of the fifth and final season released by Warner Home Video.
- No. of episodes: 4

Release
- Original release: March 30 – July 29, 2022

Season chronology
- ← Previous; Strike the Blood IV

Strike the Blood is an anime series adapted from the light novel series of the same title written by Gakuto Mikumo with illustrations by Manyako. The fifth and final OVA series, consisting of four episodes, premiered on March 30, 2022, and concluded on July 29, 2022. The ending theme is "Engagement ~Yakusoku~" performed by Risa Taneda. The OVA feature the returning cast and staff.

== Episode list ==
No.	Title	Original release date
OVA 1 (55)	"Returning With Glory I"; Transliteration: "Akatsuki no gaisen-hen I" (Japanese: 暁の凱旋篇I)	March 30, 2022
OVA 2 (56)	"Returning With Glory II"; Transliteration: "Akatsuki no gaisen-hen II" (Japanese: 暁の凱旋篇II)	March 30, 2022
OVA 3 (57)	"Returning With Glory III"; Transliteration: "Akatsuki no gaisen-hen III" (Japanese: 暁の凱旋篇III)	July 29, 2022
OVA 4 (58)	"Returning With Glory IV"; Transliteration: "Akatsuki no gaisen-hen IV" (Japanese: 暁の凱旋篇IV)	July 29, 2022
