= Strike the Blood III =

- The cover of the first Blu-ray compilation of the third season released by Warner Home Video.
- No. of episodes: 10

Release
- Original release: December 18, 2018 – September 29, 2019

Season chronology
- ← Previous; Strike the Blood II Next → Strike the Blood IV

Strike the Blood is an anime series adapted from the light novel series of the same title written by Gakuto Mikumo with illustrations by Manyako. The third OVA series, produced by Connect and with returning director Hideyo Yamamoto, debuted on December 19, 2018, and concluded on September 29, 2019. The opening theme song is "Blood and Emotions" by Kishida Kyōdan & The Akeboshi Rockets and the ending theme song is "Love Stoic" by Taneda.

== Episode list ==
No.	Title	Original release date
OVA 1 (33)	"Tartaros-Roses I"; Transliteration: "Tarutarosu no bara I" (Japanese: タルタロスの薔薇篇I)	December 19, 2018
Strange occurrences at sea result in Itogami Island becoming isolated. Nagisa continues to suffer effects from her previous exertions. A terrorist group known as Tartarus Lapse (タルタロス・ラプス) begins operations on the island.
OVA 2 (34)	"Tartaros-Roses II"; Transliteration: "Tarutarosu no bara II" (Japanese: タルタロスの薔薇篇II)	December 19, 2018
The terrorists launch an attack upon the warehouse district. Afterward, Kojo and Himeragi meet the terrorist leader, Senga Takehito, who tries to recruit them. He reveals his beliefs about the true nature of the island, its purpose of reviving Cain, and his plans to oppose this. The final terrorist attack begins with Carly attempting to shoot Asagi. Kojo and Himeragi are intercepted by December and they begin to fight. Kojo soon gains the upper hand but when December sparks his blocked memories, he blacks out, allowing Takehito to rescue December.
OVA 3 (35)	"Tartaros-Roses III"; Transliteration: "Tarutarosu no bara III" (Japanese: タルタロスの薔薇篇III)	March 27, 2019
At Mogwai's urging and with Motoki's assistance, Asagi makes her way to the Keystone Gate in order to end the hacking attack upon the island's network. Meanwhile, Kojo and Himeragi battle ineffectively against the demons unleashed by the terrorists. Sayaka and others arrive to join the fray. Kojo drinks the blood of Himeragi and Yuiri to give himself the power to win the battle. December reveals her true nature and returns the tenth familiar to him. Alone now, Takehito attempts to destroy the island's keystone but instead, his worst fears are realised.
OVA 4 (36)	"The Time of My Life I"; Transliteration: "Ōgon no hibi I" (Japanese: 黄金の日々篇I)	March 27, 2019
OVA 5 (37)	"The Time of My Life II"; Transliteration: "Ōgon no hibi II" (Japanese: 黄金の日々篇II)	May 29, 2019
OVA 6 (38)	"The Time of My Life III"; Transliteration: "Ogon no hibi III" (Japanese: 黄金の日々篇III)	May 29, 2019
OVA 7 (39)	"The War of Original Vampires I"; Transliteration: "Sinso taisen I" (Japanese: 真祖大戦I)	July 24, 2019
OVA 8 (40)	"The War of Original Vampires II"; Transliteration: "Sinso taisen II" (Japanese: 真祖大戦II)	July 24, 2019
OVA 9 (41)	"The War of Original Vampires III"; Transliteration: "Sinso taisen III" (Japanese: 真祖大戦III)	September 25, 2019
OVA 10 (42)	"The War of Original Vampires IV"; Transliteration: "Sinso taisen IV" (Japanese: 真祖大戦IV)	September 25, 2019
