= The Qwaser of Stigmata =

Japanese manga and anime series

- First tankōbon volume cover, featuring Mafuyu Oribe (center) and Alexander Nikolaevich Hell (bottom)

聖痕のクェイサー (Seikon no Kweisā)
- Genre: Adventure; Romance; Supernatural
- Manga
- Written by: Hiroyuki Yoshino
- Illustrated by: Kenetsu Satō
- Published by: Akita Shoten
- English publisher: NA: Tokyopop (former)
- Magazine: Champion Red
- Original run: August 19, 2006 – July 9, 2016
- Volumes: 24
- Anime television series
- Directed by: Hiraku Kaneko
- Written by: Makoto Uezu
- Music by: Tatsuya Kato
- Studio: Hoods Entertainment
- Licensed by: NA: Sentai Filmworks
- Original network: MBS, Tokyo MX, CTC, TVS, tvk, AT-X (TV, censored), AnimeOne (webcast, uncensored)
- English network: US: Anime Network (webcast, uncensored)
- Original run: January 9, 2010 – June 28, 2011
- Episodes: 36
- Original video animation

The Qwaser of Stigmata: Portrait of the Empress
- Directed by: Hiraku Kaneko
- Written by: Shigeru Morita
- Music by: Tatsuya Kato
- Studio: Hoods Entertainment
- Licensed by: NA: Sentai Filmworks
- Released: October 20, 2010
- Runtime: 25 minutes
- icon

The Qwaser of Stigmata (Japanese: 聖痕のクェイサー, Hepburn: Seikon no Kueisā) is a Japanese manga series written by Hiroyuki Yoshino and illustrated by Kenetsu Satō. It was serialized in Akita Shoten's manga magazine Champion Red from August 2006 to July 2016, with its chapters collected into 24 tankōbon volumes. A 24-episode anime television series was broadcast from January to June 2010. An original video animation (OVA), titled The Qwaser of Stigmata: Portrait of the Empress, was released in October 2010. A 12-episode second season was broadcast from April to June, 2011.

Sentai Filmworks licensed both seasons and the OVA for English release in North America, releasing English subtitled DVD sets in 2012 and 2013.

== Plot ==
The story chronicles the school lives of Mafuyu Oribe and Tomo Yamanobe at the Japanese Eastern Orthodox school St. Mihailov Academy, where they have endured persecution and isolation from other students led by the daughter of the current dean, Miyuri Tsujidou. and her second-in-command Hana Katsuragi. Mafuyu and Tomo's lives take a drastic turn when they nurse the silver-haired Russian-born Alexander "Sasha" Nikolaevich Hell back to health upon encountering him unconscious one day during their commute home.

Almost immediately, Sasha begins to repay Mafuyu and Tomo's kindness as he repels their tormentors; however, this does not change Sasha's background as a throw-away Qwaser from the Adepts, and that the Adepts have no qualms about making an absolute war zone of the academy in order to acquire the Theotokos of Tsarytsin from Athos, who wishes to keep the icon's existence a secret from the world.

== Media ==
=== Manga ===
Written by Hiroyuki Yoshino and illustrated by Kenetsu Satō, The Qwaser of Stigmata was serialized in Akita Shoten's manga magazine Champion Red from August 19, 2006, to July 9, 2016. Akita Shoten collected its chapters in 24 tankōbon volumes, released from December 20, 2006, to September 20, 2016.

The manga was licensed for English release in North America by Tokyopop; the company only published the first two volumes, which were released on August 10, 2010, and March 8, 2011, respectively.

=== Anime ===
A 24-episode anime television series titled The Qwaser of Stigmata (聖痕のクェイサー, Seikon no Qwaser) was adapted from the manga series of the same name and broadcast as a censored version on Biglobe. An uncensored version of the series was streamed online. The first season was followed by a single episode OVA with the title The Qwaser of Stigmata: Portrait of the Empress (聖痕のクェイサー: 女帝の肖像, Seikon no Kweisā: Jotei no Shōzō) that was released on DVD with the manga series volume 10. A 12-episode second season titled The Qwaser of Stigmata II (聖痕のクェイサー II, Seikon no Kweisā Tsū) was broadcast in Japan in 2011. The first and second seasons were also released on DVD in Japan.

Sentai Filmworks licensed both seasons and the OVA in North America and released three English subtitled DVD sets between 2012 and 2013.

- The Qwaser of Stigmata: Collection 1, 3 DVDs, episodes 1–12, released 2012-12-31.
- The Qwaser of Stigmata: Collection 2, 3 DVDs, episodes 13–24, released 2013-02-26.
- The Qwaser of Stigmata II: Complete Collection, 3 DVDs, episodes 1–12 plus the OVA, released 2013-04-30.

Anime Network posted the Season I and II episodes for online streaming (uncensored).

=== Internet radio show ===
Lantis has taken the opportunity presented by the Seikon no Qwaser anime to produce an Internet radio show starring Aki Toyosaki as Tomo Yamanobe and Yōko Hikasa as Hana Katsuragi alongside commercially releasing the five theme songs as indicated in the table below. They released also an original soundtrack composed by Tatsuya Kato on June 7, 2010.

Song title	Lyrics Author	Composition Data	Performance Parameters	Commercial Debut Date
"Errand"	Aki Hata	Composed/arranged by Daisuke Kikuta (Elements Garden)	Sung by Faylan as Opening I	27 January 2010 (Sole song on CD)
"Baptize"	Itsuki Yui	Composed/arranged by Daisuke Kikuta (Elements Garden)	Sung by Yōsei Teikoku as Opening II	21 April 2010 (Sole song on CD)
"Passionate Squall"	Aki Hata	Composed/arranged by Tom-H@ck	Sung by Ayumi Fujimura, Aki Toyosaki, Minori Chihara, Aya Hirano, Yōko Hikasa, (anime role voices) as Ending I	10 February 2010 (Sole song on CD)
"Mimei no Inori (未明の祈り)"	Aki Hata	Composed by Satoru Takada and arranged by Katsuya Yoshida	Sung by Minori Chihara as Ending II (dedicated solely to Episode 5)	10 February 2010 (Song released on Passionate Squall CD)
"Wishes Hypocrites"	Aki Hata	Composed by Katsuya Yoshida and arranged by Satoru Takada	Sung by Ayumi Fujimura, Aki Toyosaki, Minori Chihara, Aya Hirano, Yōko Hikasa (anime role voices) as Ending III	12 May 2010 (Sole song on CD)
"Rasen, Arui wa Seinaru Yokubō"	Aki Hata	Composed/arranged by Daisuke Kikuta (Elements Garden)	Sung by Faylan as Opening I from the second season	27 April 2011 (Sole song on CD)
"metaphor"	Shoujo Byou	Composed/arranged by Pixel Bee and RD-Sounds	Sung by Shoujo Byou as Ending I from the second season	25 May 2011 (Sole song on CD)

== Reception ==
Reviewer Chris Beveridge gives the series' grades in the "B" range in The Fandom Post. Theron Martin, an anime reviewer for Anime News Network who reviewed the DVD release collections 1 and 2 of the first season, gives the series grades from C+ (story) to A− (music).
