= Misato (given name) =

- Gender: Female

Origin
- Origin: Japanese
- Meaning: Different meanings depending on the kanji used

Other names
- Alternative spelling: ミサト

Misato (written: 美里 or 美郷) is a feminine Japanese given name. Notable people with the name include:

- Misato Aratama (新玉 美郷; born 1991), Japanese badminton player
- Misato Fukuen (福圓 美里; born 1982), Japanese voice actress
- Misato Komatsubara (小松原 美里; born 1992), Japanese ice dancer
- Misato Matsuoka (松岡 美里; born 2001), Japanese voice actress
- Misato Michishita (道下 美里; born 1977), Japanese Paralympic athlete
- Misato Nakamura (中村 美里; born 1989), Japanese judoka
- Misato Tanaka (田中 美里; born 1977), Japanese actress
- Misato Ugaki (宇垣 美里; born 1991), Japanese announcer
- Misato Watanabe (渡辺 美里; born 1966), Japanese singer

== Fictional characters ==
- Misato Katsuragi (葛城 ミサト), a character in the anime series Neon Genesis Evangelion
- Misato Tachibana, a character from the anime and manga series Nichijou
