= Strike the Blood =

Japanese light novel series and its adaptations

- First light novel volume cover featuring Yukina Himeragi

ストライク・ザ・ブラッド (Sutoraiku za Buraddo)
- Genre: Action; Science fantasy; Vampire
- Light novel
- Written by: Gakuto Mikumo
- Illustrated by: Manyako
- Published by: ASCII Media Works
- English publisher: NA: Yen Press
- Imprint: Dengeki Bunko
- Original run: May 10, 2011 – August 7, 2020
- Volumes: 22 + 5 sidestories
Further information
Manga
Written by	Gakuto Mikumo
Illustrated by	Tate
Published by	ASCII Media Works
English publisher	NA: Yen Press
Magazine	Dengeki Daioh
Original run	June 27, 2012 – December 26, 2016
Volumes	10
Anime television series
Directed by	Hideyo Yamamoto; Takao Sano (Note: Credited as Chief Director (チーフディレクター))
Produced by	Satoshi Fujita; Jun Fukuda; Kozue Kaneniwa; Jirou Nakagawa; Nobuhiro Nakayama; Fuminori Yamazaki; Hiroyuki Yuzawa
Written by	Hiroyuki Yoshino
Music by	Assumed Sounds
Studio	Silver Link; Connect
Licensed by	Crunchyroll (streaming); NA: Discotek Media (physical)
Original network	AT-X, Tokyo MX, MBS, CBC, BS11
English network	SA: Animax; SEA: Animax Asia
Original run	October 4, 2013 – March 28, 2014
Episodes	24
Original video animation
Strike the Blood: Kingdom of the Valkyria
Directed by	Hideyo Yamamoto; Takao Sano
Produced by	Satoshi Fukao; Jun Fukuda; Kozue Kaneniwa; Nobuhiro Nakayama; Hiroyuki Yuzawa
Written by	Hiroyuki Yoshino
Music by	Assumed Sounds
Studio	Silver Link; Connect
Licensed by	Crunchyroll (streaming)
Released	November 25, 2015 – December 23, 2015
Runtime	23 minutes
Episodes	2
Original video animation
Strike the Blood II
Directed by	Hideyo Yamamoto; Takao Sano
Produced by	Jun Fukuda; Kozue Kaneniwa; Nobuhiro Nakayama; Hiroyuki Yuzawa; Fuminori Yamazaki
Written by	Hiroyuki Yoshino
Music by	Assumed Sounds
Studio	Silver Link; Connect
Licensed by	Crunchyroll (streaming)
Released	November 23, 2016 – May 24, 2017
Runtime	30 minutes
Episodes	8
Original video animation
Strike the Blood III
Directed by	Hideyo Yamamoto
Produced by	Kozue Kaneniwa; Fuminori Yamazaki; Hiroyuki Yuzawa; Kouhei Kawase; Souji Miyagi
Written by	Hiroyuki Yoshino
Music by	Assumed Sounds
Studio	Connect
Released	December 19, 2018 – September 25, 2019
Runtime	26 minutes
Episodes	10
Original video animation
Strike the Blood: Kieta Seisō-hen
Directed by	Hideyo Yamamoto
Produced by	Kozue Kaneniwa; Fuminori Yamazaki; Hiroyuki Yuzawa; Kouhei Kawase; Souji Miyagi
Written by	Hiroyuki Yoshino
Music by	Assumed Sounds
Studio	Connect
Released	January 29, 2020
Runtime	30 minutes
Original video animation
Strike the Blood IV
Directed by	Hideyo Yamamoto
Produced by	Kozue Kaneniwa; Fuminori Yamazaki; Hiroyuki Yuzawa; Kouhei Kawase; Souji Miyagi
Written by	Hiroyuki Yoshino
Music by	Assumed Sounds
Studio	Connect
Released	April 8, 2020 – June 30, 2021
Runtime	25 minutes
Episodes	12
Original video animation
Strike the Blood Final
Directed by	Hideyo Yamamoto
Written by	Hiroyuki Yoshino
Music by	Assumed Sounds
Studio	Connect
Released	March 30, 2022 – July 29, 2022
Episodes	4
- icon

Strike the Blood (Japanese: ストライク・ザ・ブラッド, Hepburn: Sutoraiku za Buraddo), also often abbreviated in Japanese as Sutobura (ストブラ), is a Japanese light novel series by Gakuto Mikumo with illustrations by Manyako, with 22 main volumes published between May 2011 and August 2020. A manga adaptation began serialization in June 2012 in ASCII Media Works's Dengeki Daioh. A 24-episode anime television adaptation by Silver Link and Connect aired between October 2013 and March 2014. An original video animation series titled Strike the Blood II was released in four volumes between November 2016 and May 2017. A third series titled Strike the Blood III was released from December 2018 to September 2019. A fourth series titled Strike the Blood IV was released from April 2020 to June 2021. A fifth and final season titled Strike the Blood Final was released between March 2022 and July 2022.

== Plot ==
On Itogami Island, a man-made island south of Japan which has developed into a monster and demon sanctuary (魔族特区), Kojo Akatsuki is suspected of being the Fourth Progenitor, a powerful vampire who could potentially disrupt the balance of power among the world's three ruling progenitors.

Kojo was an ordinary high schooler before becoming a vampire and is reluctant to use the powers which he barely controls. Yukina Himeragi is a neophyte Sword Shaman whose first mission is to 'observe' him.

Before long, Kojo is the centre of attention of many who are concerned about the risks he represents. Kojo and Yukina befriend various students and others, some of whom are attracted to Kojo, and whose situations drive his libido, which provides the source of much of his power.

== Media ==
=== Light novel ===
Strike the Blood began as a light novel series written by Gakuto Mikumo and illustrated by Manyako. ASCII Media Works has published 22 main volumes and two side story volumes from May 10, 2011, to August 7, 2020, under their Dengeki Bunko imprint. Yen Press published the English language edition from September 22, 2015, to November 22, 2022.

No.	Title	Original release date	English release date
1	The Right Arm of the Saint; Seija no migiude (聖者の右腕)	May 10, 2011; 978-4-04-870267-6	September 22, 2015; 978-0-316-34547-7
2	From the Warlord's Empire; Sen'ō no shisha (戦王の使者)	September 10, 2011; 978-4-04-870752-7	January 19, 2016; 978-0-316-34549-1
3	The Amphisbaena; Tenshi enjō (天使炎上)	February 10, 2012; 978-4-04-886274-5	May 24, 2016; 978-0-316-34551-4
4	Labyrinth of the Blue Witch; Aoki majo no meikyū (蒼き魔女の迷宮)	June 10, 2012; 978-4-04-886633-0	September 27, 2016; 978-0-316-34553-8
5	Fiesta for the Observers; Kansoku sha tachi no utage (観測者たちの宴)	October 10, 2012; 978-4-04-886899-0	January 31, 2017; 978-0-316-34556-9
6	Return of the Alchemist; Renkinjutsu shi no kikan (錬金術師の帰還)	February 10, 2013; 978-4-04-891407-9	May 23, 2017; 978-0-316-34558-3
7	Kaleid Blood; Enkō no yahaku (焔光の夜伯)	April 10, 2013; 978-4-04-891555-7	September 19, 2017; 978-0-316-56265-2
8	The Tyrant and the Fool; Gusha to bōkun (愚者と暴君)	July 10, 2013; 978-4-04-891750-6	January 23, 2018; 978-0-316-44208-4
9	The Black Sword Shaman; Kuro no ken'nagi (黒の剣巫)	October 10, 2013; 978-4-04-866023-5	May 22, 2018; 978-0-316-44210-7
10	Bride of the Dark God; Kuraki shin ō no hanayome (冥き神王の花嫁)	March 8, 2014; 978-4-04-866428-8	September 18, 2018; 978-0-316-44212-1
11	The Fugitive Fourth Primogenitor; Tōbō no dai yon shinso (逃亡の第四真祖)	September 10, 2014; 978-4-04-866865-1	January 22, 2019; 978-0-316-44214-5
12	The Knight of the Sinful God; Kyūshin no kishi (咎神の騎士)	February 10, 2015; 978-4-04-869254-0	May 21, 2019; 978-0-316-44218-3
13	The Roses of Tartarus; Tarutarosu no bara (タルタロスの薔薇)	June 10, 2015; 978-4-04-865191-2	October 15, 2019; 978-1-9753-8483-8
14	Golden Days; Ōgon no hibi (黄金の日々)	November 10, 2015; 978-4-04-865503-3	January 21, 2020; 978-1-9753-3258-7
15	A War of Primogenitors; Sinso taisen (真祖大戦)	May 10, 2016; 978-4-04-865944-4	May 26, 2020; 978-1-9753-3260-0
16	The Mirage Paladin; Kagerō no seikishi (陽炎の聖騎士)	December 10, 2016; 978-4-04-892547-1	October 20, 2020; 978-1-9753-3262-4
17	The Broken Holy Spear; Oreta seisō (折れた聖槍)	June 9, 2017; 978-4-04-892953-0	January 19, 2021; 978-1-9753-3264-8
18	Kingdom of the Valkyries —The True Story— Shinsetsu・Varukyuria no ōkoku (真説・ヴァルキュリアの王国)	November 10, 2017; 978-4-04-893398-8	May 25, 2021; 978-1-9753-3266-2
19	The Eternal Banquet; Owaranai yoru no utage (終わらない夜の宴)	November 10, 2018; 978-4-04-912101-8	October 5, 2021; 978-1-9753-3268-6
20	Reunion of the Vampire Princess; Saikai no kyūketsu-hime (再会の吸血姫)	June 8, 2019; 978-4-04-912517-7	March 22, 2022; 978-1-9753-3854-1
21	The Twelve Blood Servants; Jū ni kenjū to chi no jūsha-tachi (十二眷獣と血の従者たち)	January 10, 2020; 978-4-04-912957-1	August 2, 2022; 978-1-9753-3856-5
22	Dawn Triumphant; Akatsuki no gaisen (暁の凱旋)	August 7, 2020; 978-4-04-913268-7	November 22, 2022; 978-1-9753-4151-0

==== Side-stories ====
No.	Title	Japanese release date	Japanese ISBN
APPEND1	The Legacy of the Doll Maker; Ningyōshi no isan (人形師の遺産)	January 10, 2018	978-4-04-893578-4
APPEND2	Day and Night of the Arai Festival; Saikōsai no hiru to yoru (彩昂祭の昼と夜)	April 10, 2018	978-4-04-893793-1
APPEND3	—	June 10, 2022	978-4-04-914456-7
APPEND4	—	October 10, 2023	978-4-04-915118-3
APPEND5	—	November 8, 2025	978-4-04-916400-8
APPEND6	—	November 10, 2026	978-4-04-952315-7

=== Manga ===
The manga was serialized from June 2012 to December 2016 in ASCII Media Works' Dengeki Daioh magazine.

The first tankōbon volume was released on December 15, 2012, and the concluding tenth volume on March 27, 2017. The English language edition, published by Yen Press, was released between October 15, 2015, and April 17, 2018.

No.	Original release date	Original ISBN	English release date	English ISBN
1	December 15, 2012	978-4-04-891279-2	October 27, 2015	978-0-316-34560-6
2	May 27, 2013	978-4-04-891685-1	February 23, 2016	978-0-316-34564-4
3	October 26, 2013	978-4-04-866015-0	May 24, 2016	978-0-316-34568-2
4	March 27, 2014	978-4-04-866393-9	September 27, 2016	978-0-316-39603-5
5	September 27, 2014	978-4-04-866834-7	December 20, 2016	978-0-316-36185-9
6	March 27, 2015	978-4-04-869298-4	March 21, 2017	978-0-316-46608-0
7	September 26, 2015	978-4-04-865352-7	June 20, 2017	978-0-316-46609-7
8	April 27, 2016	978-4-04-865740-2	September 19, 2017	978-0-316-44202-2
9	September 27, 2016	978-4-04-892370-5	December 12, 2017	978-0-316-44204-6
10	March 27, 2017	978-4-04-892767-3	April 17, 2018	978-1-9753-0013-5

=== Anime ===
A 24-episode anime adaptation produced by Silver Link and Connect began airing on October 4, 2013, on AT-X. The series is directed by Hideyo Yamamoto with scripts by Hiroyuki Yoshino and character design by Keiichi Sano. The first opening theme song is "Strike the Blood" (「ストライク・ザ・ブラッド」) by Kisida Kyoudan & The Akebosi Rockets, and the first ending theme song is "Strike my soul" by Yuka Iguchi. The second opening theme is "Fight 4 Real" by Altima and the second ending theme is "Signal" by Kanon Wakeshima. Crunchyroll streamed the series. Discotek Media released the anime series in a combined Blu-ray/DVD format on November 8, 2016.

On March 15, 2015, publisher Dengeki Bunko announced that a two-part OVA based on an original story by creator Gakuto Mikumo would be released by year's end. On August 14, 2015, further details were announced for Strike the Blood: Kingdom of the Valkyria which would be released on DVD/BD on November 25 and December 23 of that year. The opening theme is "Little Charm Fang" (「リトルチャームファング」) by Iguchi and the ending theme is "Kimi wa Soleil" (「君はソレイユ」) by Wakeshima.

A second 4 volume, 8-episode OVA series based on the 9th light novel, co-produced by Silver Link and Connect and with returning director Hideyo Yamamoto, was released between November 21, 2016, and May 24, 2017. The opening theme song is "Blood on the EDGE" by Kishida Kyōdan & The Akeboshi Rockets and the ending theme song is "Fortune Number 0405" (「フォーチュンナンバー0405」) by Risa Taneda.

A third 10-episode OVA series, produced by Connect and with returning director Hideyo Yamamoto, debuted on December 19, 2018, and concluded on September 29, 2019. The opening theme song is "Blood and Emotions" by Kishida Kyōdan & The Akeboshi Rockets and the ending theme song is "Love Stoic" by Taneda.

Another OVA titled Strike the Blood: Kieta Seisō-hen (The Lost Holy Spear) was released on January 29, 2020. A fourth, 12-episode OVA series, debuted on April 8, 2020, and concluded on June 30, 2021. Kishida Kyōdan & The Akeboshi Rockets perform the opening theme song, while Taneda performs the ending theme song. The staff from the third OVA series returned to reprise their roles. On May 15, 2020, it was announced that volume 2 was pushed back from June 24 to July 29 due to the COVID-19 pandemic.

After the conclusion of Strike the Blood IV, a fifth and final 4-episode OVA series titled Strike the Blood Final has been announced. It was released in 2 2-episode Blu-ray and DVD volumes; the first on March 30, 2022, and the second on July 29, 2022, after being delayed one month from June 29. The ending theme song is "Engagement ~Yakusoku~" by Risa Taneda.

== Reception ==
All the three volumes of the anime series' release on DVD charted among the weekly best-selling Japan's animation DVD ranking, with each compilation selling over 1,000 copies. The Blu-ray discs were also among the best-selling of a week, and have sold over 4,000 copies per volume.

Season three's second volume was reported to have sold over 7000 BRD copies in its first week of release.

=== Reviews ===
Theron Martin of the Anime News Network gave the show a B rating, praising its “Entertaining action, highly appealing female character designs, chemistry between Kojo and Yukina.” and highlighted the originality to, “...Make the male harem lead a fledgling vampire (albeit a very powerful one) who is still figuring out the ways of being a vampire.” but criticized it in that, “Most character and story elements are retreads, artistic quality control issues late in the series, how Kojo became a vampire is not sufficiently detailed.”

In describing the character designs, he wrote:

While nothing about the characters or the story arcs stands out, the series does deliver quite well on the action front and does excel in one important aspect: it has an exceptionally appealing array of female character designs to surround Kojo with. Keiichi Sano, whose other prominent character design effort was Heaven's Memo Pad, strikes gold here with designs that range from merely pretty to absolutely gorgeous.

And in summary, offered the following:

Despite its lack of freshness, Strike the Blood executes well enough, and establishes a convincing enough relationship between Kojo and Yukina, that it still proves plenty entertaining. It may be built on a tried-and-true formula which has developed over the past few years, but it does not mess it up by striving for anything too grand, by deigning to inflict preachy ramblings on its audience (see Index), or by generally failing to make sense (see Asura Cryin’).

== China ban ==
On June 12, 2015, the Chinese Ministry of Culture listed Strike the Blood among 38 anime and manga titles banned in the People's Republic of China by the Central People's Government (State Council).
