= List of Elfen Lied episodes =

Elfen Lied is an anime series adapted from the manga of the same title by Lynn Okamoto. Produced by Arms Corporation and directed by Mamoru Kanbe, it premiered on TV Tokyo's AT-X satellite channel on 25 July 2004 and concluded on 17 October 2004. The series spanned 13 episodes and was followed by a single original video animation (OVA) on 21 April 2005. The OVA episode, referred to as episode 10.5, depicts events occurring somewhere within the timespan of episode eleven of the series. The series is based around the efforts of humanity to quarantine and eradicate the diclonius, a species of mutant humans with horns. It focuses on "Lucy", who escapes her holding facility and is believed to be the first diclonius, and on two teenagers, Kohta and Yuka, whom Lucy encounters in the Japanese city of Kamakura.

Elfen Lied is licensed for English language releases by ADV Films for North America and by Madman Entertainment for Australia and New Zealand. ADV Films UK division aired the English dub of the series in the United Kingdom on Propeller TV as part of Anime Network's launch, uncensored and uncut. ADV released the series across four Region 1 DVD volumes, with the first volume released 17 May 2005. A box set, containing the entire series, was subsequently released 28 November 2006 in both North America and Europe to Region 2 DVD, and in Australia by Madman Entertainment on 4 April 2007. ADV did not include the OVA episode in the box set, instead releasing it as a standalone volume in 2006. The OVA was released by ADV Films in 2006. It was not released with the ADV series box set in 2006, nor was it dubbed into English at that time. On September 3, 2013, Distributor Section23 Films released a Blu-ray and DVD set of the series, which included the never-before released OVA with an English dub. However certain key characters have different voices (notably Lucy / Nyu).

The opening theme is "Lilium" by Kumiko Noma. The ending theme is "Be Your Girl" by Chieko Kawabe.

== Episodes ==
The words "Elfen Lied" are in German, and all episodes have alternate titles in the language. The English translations of the episode names, however, are taken from the Japanese names for the episodes. The German titles do not translate exactly to those of the Japanese titles, except in some cases. The German episode names are included in the titles during the episodes, and "DAS ENDE" (lit. "The End") is shown in German at the end of the last episode. Translations of the original German titles are given.

=== TV series ===
| No. | Title | Directed by | Written by | Original air date |
|---|---|---|---|---|
| 1 | "A Chance Encounter ~ Begegnung (lit. Meeting)"; Transliteration: "Kaikō" (Japanese: BEGEGNUNG 邂逅) | Mamoru Kanbe | Takao Yoshioka | 25 July 2004 |
A diclonius named "Lucy" escapes from an experimental laboratory off the coast of Kamakura. The lab serves as a holding facility diclonius and uses them for experiments. After killing many guards and an innocent secretary, Lucy is shot in the head and falls into the sea. Her brain damage causes her to form an innocent, somewhat infantile, split personality, "Nyu". Later, she is found by cousins Kohta and Yuka, who have reunited, after eight years, to study at university. They take her home with them. Lucy breaks Kohta's seashell, a keepsake from his younger sister, Kanae, who died "of an illness" eight years earlier. Kohta gets angry and Lucy runs away. Lucy remembers none of her past.
| 2 | "Annihilation ~ Vernichtung (lit. Annihilation)"; Transliteration: "Sōtō" (Japanese: VERNICHTUNG 掃討) | Sumio Watanabe | Takao Yoshioka | 1 August 2004 |
The offshore facility, headed by the scientist Kurama, sends a task force, led by the ruthless, cold-hearted, assassin Bando, to hunt down Lucy. They encounter her in her innocent "Nyu" state at a beach in Kamakura. She is hit over the head by Bando. Bando then tells his partner to finish off Nyu, but the hit reverts Nyu back to Lucy, who kills Bando's partner, and goes after Bando. Lucy shoots Bando and also dismembers and blinds him but, before killing him, she reverts to Nyu. After being injured by Bando, Kohta is placed in a hospital but is not severely injured, and is released hours later, while Yuka looks for Lucy. He encounters Lucy back at their house and forgives her. Back at the facility, the scientists open a door marked "7" with someone named "number 7" inside. She looks identical to Lucy and whispers "papa".
| 3 | "Deep Feelings ~ Im Innersten (lit. At the Innermost)"; Transliteration: "Kyōri" (Japanese: IM INNERSTEN 胸裡) | Takeyuki Sadohara | Takao Yoshioka | 8 August 2004 |
Yuka has been in love with Kohta since childhood. She has caught him in several awkward situations with Nyu (such as changing her wet clothes) and is increasingly jealous of his interest in Nyu. At the facility, Bando is recovering from his injuries but is being told that he will need to be castrated since he has been infected by Lucy and all of his future children will automatically be born as diclonius. Mayu, a 13-year-old girl and her dog Wanta, who witnessed the incidents in episode 2, return an umbrella, which Kohta left on the beach. She is interrogated about the events. Nana is another diclonius, codenamed "No. 7". She calls Kurama "papa". She is released, to track down Lucy and bring her back to the facility.
| 4 | "Attack ~ Aufeinandertreffen (lit. Encounter)"; Transliteration: "Shokugeki" (Japanese: AUFEINANDERTREFFEN 触撃) | Akira Iwanaga | Takao Yoshioka | 15 August 2004 |
Nana, uses the telepathic powers of diclonii to find Lucy. She fights her in a local cemetery. Mayu encounters them during the battle. Before long, Nana has all her limbs ripped off and is nearly dead, but she has damaged Lucy's ability to control vectors, temporarily sealing them. Kurama, much to his frustration, is ordered by his boss, Kakuzawa, to put Nana down as she is no longer useful. Yuka discovers that Mayu is homeless, and invites her to stay at the house.
| 5 | "Receipt ~ Empfang (lit. Reception)"; Transliteration: "Rakushō" (Japanese: EMPFANG 落掌) | Keisuke Ōnishi | Takao Yoshioka | 22 August 2004 |
After spending the night at the house, Mayu leaves. Mayu's past is revealed. Mayu's mother remarried, and her stepfather repeatedly molested her. Mayu's mother was jealous that her husband paid more attention to Mayu than to her mother. When Mayu's mother refused to help, Mayu ran away from home, and encountered a stray dog, whom she named "Wanta". In present day, Kohta and Yuka convince Mayu to come live with them. Mayu's mother happily gives Kohta guardianship of Mayu. Kohta and Yuka return to their university classes, accompanied by Nyu. Professor Kakuzawa, the son of Kurama's boss (and, by coincidence, a university lecturer) discovers Nyu. Claiming that Lucy is his brother's daughter, he takes custody of her away from Kohta and Yuka. Kakuzawa is revealed to be partly diclonius. He intends to breed with Lucy to end the reign of homo sapiens. However, she decapitates him, claiming that he is worthless in the evolution towards a diclonius-populated world. Her vectors have returned.
| 6 | "Innermost Feelings ~ Herzenswärme (lit. Heart Warmth)"; Transliteration: "Chūjō" (Japanese: HERZENSWAERME 衷情) | Kōbun Shizuno | Takao Yoshioka | 29 August 2004 |
Bando escapes from the hospital before being castrated. He seeks to take his revenge on Lucy. Professor Kakuzawa Yū's decapitated body is found by his assistant and by Kohta. On her way to school, Mayu sees Bando, and is relieved that he is alright. Because she placed a tourniquet on his arm when he was injured, he gives her his phone number so that she can call on him if she's in a pinch. This relieves the debt which he feels towards her. When he asks if she has seen a woman with horns, Mayu asks if he means Nyu. He brutally interrogates her, and she returns the phone number, saying she's in a pinch. He drops her, walks away, and says he never wants to see her again. Mayu doesn't understand why Nyu is targeted. While searching for Lucy, Kohta and Yuka develop a fondness for each other, and they kiss. Finally, Kohta and Yuka find Lucy, and take her home. Lucy recalls memories of knowing Kohta and Yuka when they were all children. Kurama, despite his orders to kill Nana, gives her new artificial limbs and money, and releases her. However, Nana comes across Bando, who sees her horns and assumes that she is Lucy.
| 7 | "Confrontation ~ Zufällige Begegnung (lit. Coincidental Meeting)"; Transliteration: "Saikai" (Japanese: ZUFAELLIGE BEGEGNUNG 際会) | Sumio Watanabe | Takao Yoshioka | 5 September 2004 |
Bando attacks Nana with heavy tungsten bullets. Unlike normal, lighter bullets, these can't be deflected with vectors, and she is wounded. Nana says that she wants to be good, as her father advised her, and not fight. He responds that she will be unwelcome everywhere because of her horns, as humans born with horns, the result of a virus, are killed at birth. Nana and others were spared for research. She remembers that Kurama was ordered to kill her, wonders why she was born at all, then turns into an evil state. Using her longer vectors, she pins Bando down, but is dealt a glancing blow by a bullet. The gun's recoil breaks Bando's prosthetic arm. The blow reverts Nana to her normal self; bleeding, she cries for Papa. Bando and Nana realize that Lucy has injured them both, and they team up. Kakuzawa reprimands Kurama, Shirakawa (Kurama's second-in-command), and Shirakawa's assistant, for letting Nana escape and for failing to find Lucy. Meanwhile, Nana, ignorant of the world outside the facility, doesn't know what to do with the money she was given, and burns some of it. She encounters Mayu at the cemetery at which she almost died, and they become friends. Nana is brought back to Kohta's home. Discovering Lucy (actually Nyu) in the home, Nana attacks her.
| 8 | "The Beginning ~ Beginn (lit. Beginning)"; Transliteration: "Kōshi" (Japanese: BEGINN 嚆矢) | Takeyuki Sadohara | Takao Yoshioka | 12 September 2004 |
Nana's blow knocks Nyu unconscious and she runs away after everyone blames her for hurting Nyu. As a result of living her life inside the facility, Nana is naive and sensitive about the events surrounding her. Nana tells Mayu that Nyu is really Lucy and what she is like, also explaining what diclonius are and their powers. Professor Kakuzawa's assistant is brought before the Chairman and forced to corporate with the facility in place of her boss. The Chairman tells Kurama he doesn't want a vaccine for the virus, but the virus. With Lucy, he wants to build a new mankind since homo sapiens are fading. Number 35 is arranged to kill Number 7 and retrieve Lucy by the Chairman over Kurama's frustration. As Lucy is recovering from being hit by Nana, she goes through a flashback of her childhood, where she was raised in an orphanage all her life where her peers constantly bullied her. Even the staff called her creepy and did nothing to stop the bullying. Feeling lonely and ignored, she begins to develop her hatred for humans. When her peers discover that she has made friends with a stray dog, (discovered when a girl pretended to be Lucy's friend) they force her to watch as they beat it to death with a vase. In her despair, rage and bloodlust, Lucy activates her vectors and kills her schoolmates and blows up the entire blood soaked orphanage, her first murders.
| 9 | "Reminiscence ~ Schöne Erinnerung (lit. Beautiful Memory)"; Transliteration: "Tsuioku" (Japanese: SCHOENEERINNERUNG 追憶) | Akira Iwanaga | Takao Yoshioka | 19 September 2004 |
Lucy's past links with Kohta are uncovered - after her dog was killed, she began to show contempt for humans and murdering entire families, until Kohta briefly befriended her. Kohta plays the series' opening theme "Lilium" in a music box which he bought in Kamakura. They go to the zoo and later play in the water, where she thanks Kohta for the most fun she'd ever had in her life. Her hope in being re-acquainted with humans is briefly regained as she starts to like Kohta, and she starts feeling conflicted over her crimes. However, when she discovers Kohta's cousin (Yuka), who he claimed to be a boy, is actually a girl, she loses hope, thinking he already had someone he liked and wondering why he lied to her. She gives in to her murderous inner voice and kills several innocents at the fair (whose deaths are thought to have been caused by a bomb).
| 10 | "Infant ~ Säugling (lit. Infant)"; Transliteration: "Eiji" (Japanese: SAEUGLING 嬰児) | Keisuke Ōnishi | Takao Yoshioka | 26 September 2004 |
Kurama's past is explained in this episode. He was a good friend of Professor Kakuzawa, who invited Kurama to work with him and his father on the diclonius project after leaving university. He reluctantly agrees, however, as he is performing research, he is infected with the diclonius virus via transmission through their vectors, and as a result, his daughter Mariko is born a diclonius. He decides to kill her, however as his wife dies from complications after giving birth, begging him to spare her, so Kurama chooses to let her live. Lucy is revealed to be the original diclonius, the queen, who infected other humans with her vectors and began the outbreak, which is why all the new cases are happening in the same area. In the present, Lucy and Nana briefly fight, but Mayu's protests cause Lucy to revert to Nyu. While Nana is taken into Kohta's household, the facility decides to send "the most powerful" diclonius, known only as "No. 35".
| 11 | "Complication ~ Vermischung (lit. Intermixing)"; Transliteration: "Sakusō" (Japanese: VERMISCHUNG 錯綜) | Keizō Kusakawa | Takao Yoshioka | 3 October 2004 |
Mariko is revealed to be the identity of No. 35. A monstrous diclonius, she instinctively kills any human she sees. She has 26 vectors and a range of 11 meters. Lucy has 4 vectors and a range of 2 meters. Under supervision from staff at the facility, she is released as a last effort to retrieve Lucy. Once free, she begins to slaughter the staff, but stops when a bomb in her arm is detonated. Since other bombs remain in parts of her body (Kakuzawa's condition to letting Kurama's daughter stay alive), she is forced to agree to work with the staff. Nana senses Mariko's presence and her desire to kill her through their ability to locate each other. Mariko and Nana meet on a bridge on the shore and battle. Kurama, who supposedly "had to leave", has joined Bando to kill Lucy without the knowledge of Shirakawa and the staff.
| 12 | "Quagmire ~ Taumeln (lit. Tumble)"; Transliteration: "Deinei" (Japanese: TAUMELN 泥濘) | Sumio Watanabe | Takao Yoshioka | 10 October 2004 |
The past which Kohta had tried to forget eight years ago comes back to him as he remembers Lucy took revenge on Kohta's lie about the gender of his cousin by killing Kohta's father and his sister Kanae. As Shirakawa dispatches Mariko to kill Lucy, Bando is paid by Kurama to kill her as well. Mariko is about to kill Nana (as well as Kohta and Lucy), until Nana uses her vectors to deactivate Mariko's and falls off the bridge, as Mariko's vectors fail and she is taken away. Shirakawa discovers Lucy's Nyu personality and identifies her as the target diclonius, only to be killed by Lucy along with the security forces enlisted to guard against Mariko. Bando arrives to kill Mariko, only to see Lucy and go after her instead.
| 13 | "No Return ~ Erleuchtung (lit. Enlightenment)"; Transliteration: "Fugen" (Japanese: ERLEUCHTUNG 不還) | Mamoru Kanbe | Takao Yoshioka | 17 October 2004 |
Mariko regains the ability to use her vectors and stages one final meeting with Lucy. They meet, and Lucy goes into a state of shock after losing one of her horns. Kurama, accompanied by Nana whom he rescued after she fell off the bridge where she battled Mariko, encounters their fight. Here, Mariko realizes that Kurama is her father and meets him for the first time, beginning to cry after finally encountering her father, who appears to have abandoned her for Nana. Kurama exchanges final words of reassurance to Mariko just before the bomb inside her chest is detonated, killing them both. The Director of the facility that had been holding Lucy, Nana and Mariko reveals he is a diclonius. Lucy, who makes it out of the fight alive, reveals her remorse and emotion for Kouta, who despite saying he can never forgive Lucy for killing his family, saying that he's always loved her and they kiss before she leaves to encounter the security team. However, Lucy's ultimate fate is unknown except that her other horn is broken, although it is possible that she is still alive or possibly dead as the shots of the guns continue, even after her horn is broken. The "family" of Kaede house, including Nana, settles down. As they are about to eat, Wanta very happily barks at someone at the door, as if Wanta knows the individual very well, and cherish. When Kohta goes to check, the music box playing "Lilium" stops and he sees a figure standing at the front door who might be Lucy. He then hears the grandfather clock, which Lucy had repeatedly attempted to repair, ticking again.

=== OVA ===
Chronologically, the OVA special fits between episodes 10 and 11. Amongst other topics, it explains how Kurama was able to capture Lucy and why she doesn't kill him whenever she encounters him.

| No. | Title | Directed by | Written by | Original release date | English release date |
|---|---|---|---|---|---|
| 10.5 | "In the Passing Rain, Or, How Can a Girl Have Reached Such Feelings? ~ Regenschauer (lit. Rain shower)" Transliteration: "Tōriame ni te arui wa, shōjo wa ikani shi te sono shinjō ni itatta ka?" (Japanese: 通り雨にて 或いは、少女はいかにしてその心情に至ったか?) | Mamoru Kanbe | Takao Yoshioka | April 21, 2005 | September 3, 2013 |
Nana is still settling in at Kohta's home. After nearly killing Mayu when her arm flies off while trying to chop lettuce, Nana is given the task of helping Nyū clean the house. However, Nana treats it as a competition between her and Nyū, and repeatedly hurts herself and damages the building as a result. After getting in an argument with Kohta about her role in the house, she runs away and ends up at the beach, where she meets Bando again. He figures out that Nana knows where Lucy is and coerces her into agreeing to bring Lucy back to the beach that night. Later, Nana manages to get Nyū out of the house by saying she wants them to take a walk together to apologize for her earlier behavior, and she gets back to the beach where she starts having second thoughts. It starts raining, and Nyū slips in a puddle of water and hits her head, knocking her out. While Nana gets Nyū sheltered from the rain and tries to reawaken her, Nyū, now Lucy again, has a flashback of a time five years after her first encounter with Kohta (three years before the present day). During the flashback, Lucy is shown to be hiding with Aiko Takada, who shares a similar interest in her as Kohta does. Lucy has been living day-to-day as a runaway for the past 5 years. However, when Kurama appears with some soldiers to try and capture Lucy, Aiko pushes her out of the way and takes a bullet to the chest that was meant for Lucy's head. In order to save her friend's life, Lucy agrees to sacrifice her freedom, and surrenders to Kurama without a struggle. Kurama promises Lucy that he will do everything he can to save Aiko, but she still ends up dying. When Kurama tells Lucy this, she tells him that she will not kill him, but instead take away everything he has ever loved, like he did to her, and she is shown crying through the mask on her face. Back at the beach, Nana is worried about Nyū because she won't wake up, and Nana can feel Lucy's life slipping away. Nyū then wakes up and, after Nana apologizes, Kouta, Yuka, and Mayu find them and they all walk home together.
