= Silpelit =

Silpelit might be:

- A figure from Eduard Friedrich Mörike's poem "Elfenlied".
- A specific type of the fictional mutant, human-evolved species of the Japanese anime and manga Elfen Lied. The Silpelit is the offspring of Homo sapiens who had their genes mutated by interaction with Diclonius vectors or from exposure to the "vector-virus".
