= List of Elfen Lied characters =

The Elfen Lied cast in the manga

The characters in the Elfen Lied manga and anime series & movie were created by Lynn Okamoto, with character-design assistance from Seiji Kishimoto for the anime adaptation. The plot and characters are described, below, using in-universe tone. Elfen Lied takes place in Kamakura, Japan, where a fictional mutant human sub-species, with violent telekinetic powers, has been discovered. Known as a Diclonius, any person showing signs of the mutation have either been contained in the Diclonius research facility or exterminated.

== Primary characters ==
=== Lucy ===
Voiced by: Sanae Kobayashi (Japanese); Kira Vincent-Davis (TV), Carli Mosier (OVA) (English)

The female lead characters of Elfen Lied, left to right: Mayu, Yuka, Nyu, Nana

Kaede (楓), also known as Lucy (ルーシー, Rūshi) and Nyu (にゅう, Nyū), is a diclonius girl and the main protagonist of the series.

She is assumed to be fifteen by Kōta, but never stated (eighteen in the anime). Lucy has vectors with a limited range of about two meters (6.56168 ft). However, she can be swift and lethal within that range, and will use any nearby objects as high-velocity projectiles to kill at greater distances. She is also capable of stopping or deflecting most standard ammunition when she concentrates on the task.

Lucy hates humans mainly because of how she was abused by her human peers as a child, several of whom she eventually killed after they captured a puppy which Lucy had been caring for and beat it to death in front of her, which led to her brutally murdering them out of revenge. Consequently, she discounts non-diclonii, claiming they are not real people, to the point of telling Nana that she has "not killed one of her own yet". She seems to lack empathy and kills without much concern as a usual first reaction, often killing on reflex or simply because she can. She is incredibly sadistic, severing limbs and blinding foes, sometimes leaving them to bleed to death rather than killing them outright. Despite this lack of concern for human life, she won't harm Kōta, and cries and apologizes for sadistically killing his family in a fit of jealousy eight years before; she loves him, but due to her actions in the past, she believes he'll be content without her existence. As such, she tries to make her Nyu persona emerge when he's around and refrains from killing in his presence, except at the series' end, when, in the anime, she kills an entire Special Assault Team unit in front of him and in the manga, she kills them after an unnamed Agent shoots at Kōta while he's holding Nōsō at gunpoint. However, Lucy still is not above acts of jealousy, once using her vectors to shove Yuka when she saw her holding hands with Kōta, but didn't try to kill her.

==== Nyu ====
Voiced by: Sanae Kobayashi (Japanese); Kira Vincent-Davis (TV), Carli Mosier (OVA) (English)

Nyu (にゅう, Nyū) is an alter ego of Lucy that developed after a .50 BMG round pierces the metallic helmet encasing her head when she escaped. Nyu has a childlike personality and infantile knowledge of the world, and lacks spoken language skills, being able to say only "nyū" and later "Kōta" most of the time. As the series progresses she develops a wider vocabulary; by the halfway point she is able to speak perfectly normal, however still saying "Nyu" sometimes. She's innocent and incapable of violent acts, a foil to Lucy. When Nyu is attacked or hit on the head, she regresses into Lucy; likewise, when Lucy is treated with love and kindness, or wants to hide herself from Kōta, she'll change back into Nyu. While Nyu exists at first due to trauma, Lucy subconsciously encourages her presence due to her feelings of guilt towards Kōta and to prevent her from harming him more than she did eight years before.

Nyu cuts her hair to try to look like Kōta's deceased younger sister Kanae, whom he said horrible things to before she was killed by Lucy. However that hair cut was the same she had eight years before, making him vaguely remember her.

Nyu suppresses Lucy for a large portion towards the series' end, due to one of her horns being damaged, but reemerges in her second fight with Bando. She returns again in chapter 83, when her horns return even larger than before and her vectors are much longer (long enough to reach a flying helicopter) as she slaughters soldiers in front of Kōta after he has been critically injured. This causes him to remember that she's the one who killed his family. However, her horns are damaged again and she is captured and brought back to Director Kakuzawa. He reveals his plot to terminate mankind and to fill the world with Diclonii and convince her to join him. But despite still being Nyu, she is able to use her vectors and later, as Lucy, she kills him. She escapes the sinking island in order to face Kōta once again.

Still injured, he's waiting for her and takes her to the top of a lighthouse that his sister liked the view from. There Lucy tearfully apologizes and Kōta, who refuses to forgive her, has her promise to never kill again. She does and goes to get an ambulance, but a vengeful Kurama is waiting for her and shoots at her. Lucy is prepared to die but her newly (fully) manifested third personality, based entirely on Diclonius instincts (the one which in flashbacks was what urged Lucy to start killing), cuts off his arm. Kōta appears and thinks that she has already broken the promise. Kurama then fires again, but Kōta steps in the way to protect her, making her remember Aiko's sacrifice. Lucy then goes on a rampage with her vectors now even longer, destroying the city and causing the military to attack her. However, her entropy reaches its limit and her body begins to deteriorate (something that Kakuzawa advised before), so she uses her remaining powers to put Kōta's cells back together and save him as she sings "Elfenlied". The entire Kaede inn family arrive as do the military, and Lucy, now unrecognisable, definitively switches into her DNA voice, beginning to attack them and then spread her vectors worldwide, threatening to blow up the entire planet and kill every living being. Fulfilling the vow he made to Lucy as children, Kouta reluctantly shoots her.

Ten years later, it's revealed that both Lucy and Nyu have been reincarnated into twins, one of them named Kaede.

In the anime Lucy seemingly lets herself fall to death instead though an audio drama revealed she did survive it, coming back as Nyu.

=== Kouta ===
Voiced by: Chihiro Suzuki (Japanese); Adam Conlon (TV), Christine Auten (young), Blake Shepard (OVA) (English)

Kouta (コウタ/耕太, Kōta) is the main male protagonist of the series and is first introduced when he arrives in Kanagawa Prefecture to attend college, having previously arranged to stay with his cousin Yuka while at school.

Kouta enters the story when Yuka's family gives him a closed-down restaurant, the Kaede House, as long as he maintains it, and begins living there with Yuka while going to a university. Kouta has repressed traumatic memories of witnessing the deaths of his father and younger sister, Kanae, which is later revealed to have been by Lucy's hand, who acted out of jealousy. Due in part to these losses, Kouta is sympathetic towards girls in trouble and is extremely generous and protective to the girls around him.

He first met Lucy in his childhood while his family was visiting Yuka's for the summer. When he goes to the mountain to draw, he ran into Lucy, who ran away after she murdered the bullies who abused her and beaten her puppy to death. In the anime, he takes with him a music box he had recently purchased which played "Lilium" and strikes up a conversation with her when she apparently likes the song from the music box. He finds her horns fascinating and gives her a hat to cover them up while in public. He asks her if they can be friends and spends time with her, taking her to the zoo, telling her that he likes to look at the "weird animals." In Lucy's hallucination, she perceives this as a reason for why he was so nice to her. He lies to her about the gender of his cousin by saying that it is a boy, so she would not be upset or jealous. When she finds out that he lied to her, she kills dozens of people at the party, stows away onto his train and kills his family. Before she goes to kill Yuka, he tackles her and yells at her to stop killing people and she flees in tears, realising that she might have lost him forever.

His repressed memories are triggered when Lucy uses her vectors to kill over a dozen soldiers (and a Mariko clone in the manga) in front of him. The reunion between Kouta and Lucy is vastly different. In the manga, Lucy apologizes and Kouta, who's very harsh towards her, has her vow to never kill again, but Kurama shoots at her and Kouta steps in the way to protect her. As Lucy's body begins to deteriorate, she uses her remaining powers to put Kouta's cells back together and save him. After soldiers tried to kill her, Lucy, now unrecognisable and switched to her DNA voice, spreads her vectors worldwide, threatening to blow up the entire planet and decimate every living being in it. Fulfilling the promise he made to Lucy as children, Kouta reluctantly kills her. Ten years later, with the Diclonius menace eradicated, Kouta and Yuka are married and subsequently name their daughter Nyu.

In the anime adaptation, Lucy assures Kouta that she can do so in five years, but refuses to because that would mean his death. Kouta seems to understand that something truly horrible must have happened to shape her into a cold-blooded killer and, while still stating he is unable to forgive her, Kouta professes his love for Lucy. Lucy then kisses Kouta and they hug. Sometime later, Kouta along with the "family" of Kaede house, including Nana, settles down until the music box stops, a figure appears at the front door and the grandfather clock starts ticking.

=== Yuka ===
Voiced by: Mamiko Noto (Japanese); Nancy Novotny (English)

Yuka (ユカ) is Kouta's cousin, around his age, who moves in with him at the Kaede's inn after realising that Nyu can't be left alone. She has had feelings for Kouta since childhood, and she reacts jealously to Kouta's attention for Nyu. However, it is later shown that she is jealous of any girl, regardless of age, who she suspects may be close to Kouta, to the point of being irrational, although in the anime, Yuka's jealousy is mostly limited to Nyu.

At first she is angry when she finds out Kouta doesn't remember her, but when she realises the reason, she cries.

At one point he reciprocates the feelings, while Kouta and Yuka are searching for Nyu (after she escapes from the Professor's lab), they take shelter from the rain at the Sasuke Inari Shrine. While holding each other in an attempt to keep warm, Kouta apologizes for not remembering anything about the time they were together as kids, but states that he remembers that he liked her then and that he always liked her. The tw kiss, with Yuka even becoming sexually aroused, and promise to always be with each other. However, when they subsequently find Nyu, Kouta and Nyu share a long hug, and Yuka immediately becomes jealous again.

In the anime Mayu once described her as the "mother" at the inn, and Kouta as the "father". Yuka possess a caring and mature side, and seems to be protective of both Nyu and Mayu, and later Nana. It is clear that Yuka cares for the girls deeply since she, like Kouta, is unable to turn away people who have been abandoned by their parents and society. However, in quite a few ways, she is a typical teenager, particularly when it comes to dealing with her feelings for Kouta and friendships with the girls who come to live with them.

In the last chapter she is shown rebuilding the inn with the others. Ten years later, Kouta and Yuka are married and subsequently name their daughter Nyu.

=== Mayu ===
Voiced by: Emiko Hagiwara (Japanese); Cynthia Martinez (English)

Mayu (マユ) is a young thirteen year old homeless girl (In the manga she is introduced at age twelve and turns thirteen; but in the anime she is introduced at age 13 and turns 14). She's first introduced when she arrives at the closed-down restaurant (then inhabited by Kouta, Yuka and Nyu) to return an umbrella she found at the beach. She's homeless and lives on the beach with a stray puppy that she calls Wanta, subsisting mostly on bread crusts from a nearby bakery.

During the fight between Lucy/Nyu and Nana, Mayu is knocked out. When she awakens in the hospital, she has them call Kouta claiming he's a relative. Kouta and Yuka, pondering as to why she didn't call her real family (and already suspecting that Mayu may be homeless), ask her to stay for dinner at the Kaede House. Mayu, deciding that the fight between Lucy/Nyu and Nana was simply a bad dream, develops a friendship with Nyu as they bathe together, and Mayu accepts an offer to spend the night. The next morning, Kouta and Yuka discover that Mayu is gone; she has left a note thanking them for their help but stating that she does not want to be a burden on anyone.

It is revealed that Mayu had endured molestation by her stepfather before she ran away from home. Her own mother would not protect her, because she was jealous of the attention Mayu was receiving from the stepfather. Mayu ran away from home, and while wandering at the beach, she befriended Wanta, who was also alone.

Back in the present, Mayu and Wanta return to the beach, but Wanta's original owner arrives, calling him James, and takes him away, while rudely turning down Mayu's request to visit him because of her dirty clothing. Mayu tries to comfort herself with the thought that Wanta will at least be able to live in a safe home with plenty of food, but later breaks down and cries. Losing her only friend, Mayu is devastated and spends the night, which is her birthday, alone, trying to shelter herself from the rain and cold, while wishing that Wanta was with still with her.

In the manga, a police officer finds her huddled in a shack, she flees and goes back to the inn. Finding Kouta, Yuka and Nyu waiting for her, who then present Mayu with a small cake from the bakery — the woman at the bakery who provides Mayu with breadcrusts had saved it for her since it was her birthday. Mayu, surprised and happy at their compassion for her, becomes overwhelmed with emotions and begins to cry, Kouta then explains that she can stay at the inn as long as she helps out with cleaning. Meanwhile, Wanta is seen eagerly waiting outside, having decided that he would rather be with Mayu than with his previous owner.

The above events are different in the anime; when two police officers find Mayu in the shack, she tries to run from them, but she bumps into Kouta, Yuka and Nyu, who have spent all day searching for her. After telling the police that Mayu is family (much to Mayu's surprise), they return to the Kaede inn, where they offer to let Mayu stay with them.

When Kouta and Yuka meet Mayu's mother, she officially transfers Mayu into their care without a second thought. In both the manga and the anime, Kouta and Yuka comment about how strange it was that her mother was so eager to abandon her own daughter and why she never notified the police that Mayu was missing. However, they decide not to ask questions. The next time Mayu is seen, she is happy and smiling. She has enrolled in a nearby school, leaving each morning in her school uniform with a smile on her face (Kouta and Yuka are amazed at how much Mayu has cheered up). Wanta, who has been given a doghouse, also chooses to stay at the inn. Mayu helps around the house with chores whenever she can, and soon comes to view Kouta and Yuka as her parents and Nyu as a sister.

Later, Mayu meets up with Nana, and the two become friends. Mayu convinces Kouta and Yuka to let Nana stay at the house as well, despite Nana's initial hostility to Nyu (whom Nana recognizes as Lucy). Nana eventually opens up to Mayu and tells her the true story of the Diclonius, Lucy/Nyu, and her vectors. Mayu does everything she can to convince Nana that Nyu is not dangerous, still refusing to believe that Nyu and Lucy could possibly be the same person.

It appears that Mayu has feelings for Bando, or at least she sees him as the father she's never had. When he seemingly died, she took up cleaning the beach.

=== Nana ===
Voiced by: Yuki Matsuoka (Japanese); Sasha Paysinger (English)

Nana (ナナ), also known as Number 7, is a young Silpelit girl, born from a human infected with the Diclonius virus, who has the physical appearance of a teen, while she's actually a child; it's explained that Silpelits age more rapidly than humans (or a "Queen Diclonius" like Lucy). Her name, 'Nana', is Japanese for the number seven, the number by which she was called at the research facility and a fairly common female name in Japan. Most Diclonius babies are euthanized at birth in sweeps of hospital maternity wards, but Nana was one of a handful kept alive for use as a test subjects and has spent her entire life in the Diclonius research facility.

Nana sees Kurama as her father, whom she calls "Papa," because she needed something to keep her from going insane during the torturous experimentation, believing that she is making him proud. Kurama, in turn, sees her as his own daughter and cares very much for her. In an attempt to recapture Lucy, Kurama sent out Nana to find her, since diclonii can telepathically sense each other and, as a present, gives her his tie, something which Nana had always wanted, which she wears as a bow to partially conceal her horns. Despite orders not to engage Lucy after locating her, Nana wanted to impress Kurama so she tried to capture Lucy herself. Lucy and Nana engaged in a brutal battle, but although Nana's vectors are longer, Lucy was more powerful. Kurama, along with a group of soldiers, arrive in time to stop Lucy before she can kill Nana, but not before Lucy uses her vectors to tear off Nana's limbs. Although Nana survives by deactivating Lucy's vectors, Director Kakuzawa decides that she's no longer useful and orders Kurama to kill her. Although Kurama has terminated over a dozen diclonius babies while working for the institute, he defies the Director's order - providing Nana with prosthetic limbs that she can control with her vectors (a running gag is that they often fall off) and secretly setting her free with money to survive and a promise that they will be together again one day.

Nana initially feels alone and despondent, but becomes friends with Mayu. Mayu convinces Nana to come with her to the Kaede inn, but this initially leads to a confrontation, when Nana sees Nyu (recognizing her as Lucy) and attacks her. After running away, Mayu follows her, and Nana reveals the whole truth about the vectors, Lucy/Nyu, and Kurama (in the manga this happens much later). Mayu convinces her stay at the Kaede inn, while telling Kouta and Yuka that Nana only attacked Nyu because she was cranky from being hungry, and that like Nyu, Nana has no place to go because of her horns. Despite Nana's lingering fears about Nyu (whom she believes may become Lucy again), she tries to adjust to life at the house, although she refuses to tell Kouta and Yuka anything about the Diclonii and their vectors. At one point, after an argument, Nana briefly considers leaving out of anger, but after Kouta (using some reverse psychology) asks her where she will go, Nana quickly becomes emotional and breaks down; crying in Yuka's arms, Nana admits she is scared and doesn't know what she would do if she was alone again. As Yuka hugs Nana to comfort her, Kouta gently places his hand on her head, and welcomes her into their "family".

Unlike many other Diclonii, because Kurama treated her with kindness, Nana is not homicidal or sadistic, and has never used her vectors against humans. However, her fighting skills are extraordinary (she managed to almost defeat Mariko and her clones but was stopped by Kurama's presence). She also has the exclusive ability to temporarily disable another Diclonius' vectors by having her vectors go through their pineal gland. Although her vectors are superior to Lucy's in terms of range (5 meters to Lucy's 2, 16 ft to 7 ft) and has certain abilities, she lacks Lucy's sheer strength and violent nature; Nana's empathy for others does not allow her to fight with as much instinct to kill. While physically skilled and intuitive with her vectors, she loses many fights in the series solely because of her kind nature. With her vectors, she is later able to manipulate prosthetic arms and legs, and even throw them like a "rocket punch".

Nana can be seen as the exact opposite of Lucy. While Lucy's default personality is serious and cold, Nana's is friendly and kind; Lucy's split personality "Nyu" is similar to Nana's default, while Nana sometimes goes into trances and acts cold like Lucy's default personality. Nana is in the middle of the spectrum of Lucy's split personalities: she's not as mature as Lucy, but more mature than Nyu. She is in fact extremely childish due to her young age.

Nana discovers Kurama, but he shuns her away at first, clinging to Cynthia's, one of Mariko clones, bisected corpse, thinking she was his daughter. Another clone, Barbara, shows up and fights with Nana. When she's about to kill Nana and threatens to kill Kurama, he shoots her in the head, finally realizing that she wasn't his Mariko, and regains his sanity. At the series' end, Nana and Kurama are shown together visiting a grave marked "Kurama" and Kurama holding Mariko's ashes. It's revealed that they're now living together. Nana asks him to take her as his wife and begins crying, questioning whether Kurama wanted to "make babies with Nana", to which Kurama smiles and responds, "Why are you saying such silly things? Nana is my...", as the scene fades.

In the anime, after Kurama dies, Nana is devastated and almost gives up all hope for the future. When Lucy and Nana meet shortly afterward, Lucy tells Nana to do what she herself cannot: to return to the Kaede House and live happily with Kouta and the others, which Nana does.

=== Nozomi ===
Nozomi (ノゾミ) is an eighteen-year-old soft-spoken and shy friend of Yuka. Though she desires to become a singer, she has a psychological bladder problem because of her father's frequent abuse, causing her to wear diapers. After an initial encounter with Kouta causes Nozomi to embarrass herself and wet her clothes, he pushes her into a nearby reflecting pool to hide the reason for her wet clothes. This earns her trust and friendship, and she even prevents him from getting hit by an angry Yuka shortly thereafter.

Nozomi is revealed to have a great talent for singing. However, due to her father's abuse due to her throat defect as well as being the only heir to her father's corporation, Nozomi has no place to study and prepare for the difficult entrance exams for her musical education. Nozomi often stays with Yuka and Kouta so that she can prepare for the entrance exam without her father's approval, and later moves in with them after she passes and is accepted as a student. While she's extremely embarrassed about her friends discovering her need to wear diapers at first, she eventually comes to trust them enough that she stops trying to hide it. Nana notes later that year that Nozomi was familiar enough with the occupants of Kaede Inn that she eventually took to wearing just a diaper and a shirt short enough to leave her diaper fully exposed. Nozomi teaches Nyu to sing the titular song "Elfenlied".

Nozomi is a Manga-exclusive character, being replaced in the Anime adaptation by a music box purchased by a young Kouta containing the song "Lilium" (the opening theme of the series) rather than "Elfenlied".

== Antagonists ==
=== Kurama ===
Voiced by: Osamu Hosoi (Japanese); Jay Hickman (English)

Kurama (蔵間) is one of the antagonists in the series. He is also the surrogate father of Nana and biological father of Mariko. When giving birth, his wife Hiromi Kurama was diagnosed with cervical cancer and had her cervix removed. When he sees his daughter has horns, Kurama tries to strangle her, however he stopped when his wife collapses from the shock of this and blood loss. He then goes to Mariko's incubator to finish his job, but his bleeding wife appears behind him, begging him not to hate their child and collapses dead. Although he had previously been tasked with killing all diclonius births, he falters after his wife's sacrifice. It's revealed that Director Kakuzawa kept Mariko alive, increasing Kurama's perceived debt to him. Kurama cares deeply for Nana (who calls him "Papa") and seems to think of her as his own child. When the director orders Kurama to kill Nana, he decides to disobey him, and secretly sets Nana free with some money and a promise that they will be together again some day.

In a flashback to five years earlier, upon seeing that his newborn daughter is a diclonius, Kurama suddenly remembers an encounter a year earlier at the facility where an escaped diclonius - Silpelit n. 3 - touched him and his colleague Oomori with her vectors. Although neither of the men is apparently harmed by this action (and it's largely forgotten), the colleague's daughter is also born as a diclonius a week before Mariko (Kurama decides to euthanize his colleague's daughter himself). Upon seeing Mariko, Kurama then realizes that the virus that causes diclonius births is spread through the vectors, thus solving the mystery (until that point) as to why the number of diclonius births was continuing to increase. It is also revealed that Kurama's wife died of complications from the birth only because she frantically tried to stop Kurama from strangling Mariko in her cradle, and that after watching his wife die in his arms, Kurama decided to honour his wife's last wish by letting Mariko live.

Lucy carries a deep hatred toward Kurama, stemming from his failure to save Aiko Takada, who was shot after protecting Lucy from a bullet. However, she states that she won't kill him but will instead kill everyone that he cares about to make him experience the same pain.

In the final episode of the anime, in one of the series' most emotional scenes, Kurama and Mariko meet and she realizes that he is her father. Mariko tells him that during her entire life at the institute's prison, she dreamed that one day he and her mother would come to take her home so they could live as a real family. She then demands to know why he abandoned her. Kurama raises his gun to shoot her but is unable to do so, and instead walks over to her and hugs her tightly. He reflects on the fact that he killed dozens of Diclonius girls in their cradles but left his own daughter to suffer in a dark prison her entire life. He then picks her up in his arms and promises they will never again be apart. He tells Nana that they can no longer be together and that she must try to have a happy life without him. As he walks away, Kurama signals an assistant to detonate the remaining bomb inside of Mariko's body. Kurama then tells Mariko that he never stopped thinking about her for a moment and that her mother loved her until the moment she died. The assistant hesitates at first, wondering if Kurama had been planning this outcome all along, but then activates the bomb. Hearing the bomb about to detonate, Kurama and Mariko tightly embrace; Kurama then has a brief vision of what their lives might have been like if Mariko had not been born as a diclonius (the images include: he and his wife with Mariko after her birth, feeding her in a highchair, comforting her, carrying her on his shoulders, and her first day of school). The bomb then detonates in a massive explosion, killing both of them.

That encounter is different in the original manga, with Kurama being saved, from the missiles fired at them (which turned out to be dummies that do not explode), by Mariko, who had a split personality as a result. Lucy then appears and Mariko (worried about the safety of her father) confronts and fights her. With her legs cut off and the cellphone destroyed, Mariko clings to Lucy as the bombs inside her detonate; this results in Lucy's horns being damaged and turning back into Nyu, as well as Mariko's death. Kurama, depressed by his pathetic ability as a father, attempts to commit suicide with a gun, but is saved by Bandō, and lives with him in a small shed on the beach, while becoming insane.

He shows up at the raid at Kaede inn, and sees the dying Mariko clone, Cynthia. He is later discovered by Nana, but he shuns her away at first, clinging to Cynthia's corpse, thinking she's his daughter. The penultimate surviving clone, Barbara, shows up and Kurama tries to embrace her too. She however attacks him and fights with Nana. When she is about to finish Nana off, Kurama shoots her in the head and regains his sanity. He then reconciles with Nana and confronts Lucy at the end, who shows a third personality and rips his arm off. However Nana saves him and in the last chapter they appear at a grave with Mariko's ashes, he with two arms (meaning he got a prosthetic as well), and it is revealed they are living together.

Kurama and Bando in the anime

=== Bando ===
Voiced by: Jōji Nakata (Japanese); Jason Douglas (TV), David Wald (OVA) (English)

Bandō (坂東) is an operative in his mid-30s for the National Police Agency's Special Assault Team (SAT). Though he is fully human, he's as homicidal and apathetic to other people as the worst Diclonii are. He is a hardy and effective soldier, even though he often disobeys orders so that he can indulge his need for violence.

After Lucy escapes, Bando is one of the SAT members sent to capture her. When Bando finds Lucy on the beach, he initially only encounters the Nyu personality, but Lucy's one soon emerges and slaughters his partner and attacks him. Bando, always eager for combat, initially welcomes the challenge, but he quickly discovers that Lucy's vectors can deflect his MP5's 9mm bullets with almost no effort, and is then forced to dodge numerous heavy objects that Lucy throws at him. Ultimately, Lucy overpowers Bando and then takes great pleasure as she mutilates him, severing his right arm at the elbow, and breaking his left forearm so severely that his left hand is left dangling uselessly. Bando screams in pain, promising that he will never forget Lucy's face; Lucy responds by using two of her vectors' fingers to destroy his eyes, blinding him. Deciding that torturing Bando is no longer fun, Lucy decides to choke him, but her Nyu personality suddenly emerges, and she runs away. Bando, blinded and bleeding profusely, is left lying on the ground, cursing and thrashing around in pain. Alerted by the noise, Mayu (who was taking shelter nearby) finds Bando and applies an improvised tourniquet on his arm stump before calling an ambulance, thus saving his life.

Back at the Diclonius research facility, Bando, who is seen heavily bandaged, screams and curses as Kurama tells him that he must undergo castration surgery, since he has now been infected with the vector virus (and thus any children he fathers will be born as diclonii). Kurama explains to Bando the truth about the diclonii and their invisible vectors (hands) and their true purpose to destroy the human race.

After his initial recovery, Bando is outfitted with biomechanical implants, including bionic eyes to restore his vision and a highly advanced Myoelectric prosthetic hand. However, he escapes before the castration operation can be performed. Seeking revenge against Lucy, he acquires several weapons, including at least two pistols that fire specially designed .50 Action Express tungsten bullets. While these bullets can be pushed off-course at long range, they are so powerful at close range that not even Lucy can stop them. Bando is driven by the will to fight and to prove his superior ability in combat, as well as to take revenge against Lucy for maiming him.

In the last episode of the anime, Bando is defeated again by Lucy, who simply tells him that they will never meet again before leaving him lying on the beach. It is implied that he survives, although the extent of any new injuries that Lucy may have inflicted on him is unclear.

In the manga his role is extended a bit more, he lives on the beach that he fought Lucy on and constantly cleans up the trash and debris, so that when they fight again she has nothing to use as weapons. He is shown to have a more compassionate side, such as saving Kurama, and burying the dead Silpelit #28. While he is violent, ruthless and all too willing to kill, he takes great offense to acts of perversion, such as child molestation; when Mayu asks for his aid when she is attacked by an unnamed assassin, Bando expresses intense disgust over the man's actions.

This then leads to Bando's second fight with Lucy on his beach, where he is severely injured while protecting Mayu from an attack by Lucy after the latter is exposed as a killer to the young girl. Lucy rips off his remaining arm and cuts him in half at the waist, then flees. While dying in Mayu's arms, Bando reflects that he had always wanted someone to cry for him after he died, since he had isolated himself from human contact for all his life; and he now seems to be at peace. In the final chapter, Mayu is seen cleaning the beach where Bando had come to live in his memory when Bando returns to see Mayu, where it is shown that his lower half of his body has been fitted with bionics.

=== Mariko ===
Voiced by: Tomoko Kawakami (Japanese); Luci Christian (English)

Mariko Kurama (蔵間 マリコ, Kurama Mariko), also known as Number 35, is the daughter of Kurama. She is described as the most powerful diclonius; in the anime, it is stated that she has 26 vectors (although in the manga, she has over 50) which have a range of up to 11 metres (36 feet). Mariko's condition was the result of an escape attempt by Number 3, when Kurama was infected by her vectors, turning him into a carrier of the Diclonius virus, which ultimately caused Mariko to be born as a diclonius, much to her father's shock and horror.

As an infant, Mariko was imprisoned and raised inside a massive steel container deep underground with no human contact other than with Saito, a scientist acting as a foster mother through speakers and monitors. She has been kept alive on pure nutrients that are intravenously fed into her body through large tubes. Throughout her life, her body has been completely immobilized through the use of restraints, which are deemed necessary to reduce the chance that she could try to escape. When she is released, she struggles to even stand - since she has spent her entire life in restraints and being fed intravenously, her body is severely emaciated and atrophied. Although she can still propel herself through the air with her vectors, she must use a wheelchair to move around.

Despite the environment she was raised in, Mariko is relatively well-developed psychologically. She is extremely homicidal and sadistic, and enjoys torturing and dismembering her victims. She has no problems in torturing and murdering others, no matter what race or species they belong to, be it human or diclonius. However, her personality is not blatantly evil. She is only having fun, seeing killing as a game, and the pleasure she gets from it is equivalent to a child ripping the wings off of an insect or burning ants with a magnifying glass. She is in fact capable of caring about others and has a strong love for Kurama.

In order to keep Mariko under control, the research institute implanted bombs in her body during infancy; one is used to sever her right arm to bring her under control after she attacks and mortally wounds Saito, the scientist at the institute who acted as her foster mother, as she realised she wasn't truly her mother. She is sent to kill Nana, during the confrontation with, Kurama tells both of them about the circumstances of the birth of Mariko. Feeling rejected by her father and believing that he favors Nana, Mariko attempts to kill her as an act of revenge, but is stopped by Bando, who, at the request of Kurama, escapes carrying Nana with him, although he is not able to prevent her from returning to the fight.

Meanwhile, Kurama reconciles with Mariko, who immediately afterward protects him from being hit by a non-explosive missile. After being hit by this missile, Mariko temporarily manifests a split personality like Lucy/Nyu that is infantile and affectionate towards her father. Nyu then appears searching for Nana, Kurama shoots her and she turns into Lucy. Lucy attempts to kill him, but Mariko sacrifices herself to save her father. She tries to kill Lucy to protect Kurama by activating the bombs that were inside of her body, while holding on to Lucy, but fails despite her efforts. While the bombs indeed go off, they do not kill Lucy. She instead only loses her horns, and becomes Nyu for the next several months, but not before tearing Mariko's head off just mere seconds from the explosion.

In the final episode of the anime, this encounter is different. Mariko tells him that during her entire life at the institute's prison, she dreamed that one day he and her mother would come to take her home and live as a real family. She demands to know why he allowed her to suffer in the institute her whole life, and becomes jealous when Nana calls Kurama "papa." Mariko threatens to kill Nana, and Kurama raises his gun but is unable to shoot her. Instead, Kurama walks over to Mariko and hugs her tightly. He then picks her up in his arms, and promises they will never again be apart, while ordering an assistant to detonate the remaining bomb inside of her body. Kurama then tells Mariko he never stopped thinking about her and that her mother loved her until the moment she died. The assistant, after hesitating, activates the bombs, killing the both of them.

=== Director Kakuzawa and Anna Kakuzawa ===
Voiced by: Kinryu Arimoto (Japanese); Andy McAvin (English)

Director Kakuzawa (角沢長官, Kakuzawa Chōkan) is the main antagonist of the series. He is the head of the research center, at 70+ years old performing experiments on Diclonius. He is from a long line of Diclonius ancestry that has been watered down by inter-breeding with humans. As a result, he has no vectors and much smaller horns on his head, which he hides under a wig. His and his son's aim are in part to replenish their bloodline by mating with the Diclonii they are experimenting on (of which Lucy is the first to be able to reproduce) and thus gain power as "kings" of the new race, which would wipe out humanity and replace it entirely. He even claims to desire the position of a god of the new, Diclonius-ruled world he envisions and has rockets fired and detonated in the air to spread the Diclonius virus.

He is the father of Anna Kakuzawa and Professor Kakuzawa, He turned his daughter Anna into a gigantic immobile creature with an extremely high intellect and the ability to predict the future. After capturing Lucy and revealing his plot to terminate mankind and to fill the world with Diclonius, Lucy's vectors turn visible and cause an explosion on the island that releases all the captured Diclonius. When Lucy cuts off Anna's arms, Kakuzawa convince her to join him, But he is beheaded by her. Lucy then says that he is not a Diclonius at all, as she does not sense him like the other Diclonii, and that his horns were just the result of an unrelated mutation. She then kills Anna, who tries to avenge her father. In the anime, he is not killed, and continues with his plans. In the last chapter, a normal Anna is seen next to the gigantic creature's body.

=== Professor Kakuzawa ===
Voiced by: Hiroaki Hirata (Japanese); John Swasey (English)

Professor Kakuzawa (角沢教授, Kakuzawa Kyōju) is the 30-something son of Director Kakuzawa. Like his father, he is a watered-down Diclonius with small horns and no vectors. When he and Kurama were younger, they both went to university together. It was Kakuzawa who originally got Kurama involved in research on the Diclonius. He is the lecturer for a course at the university in which Kouta and Yuka are enrolled. After tricking Kouta and Yuka into releasing Lucy/Nyu to him (under the pretense that she is his younger brother's missing daughter), he sedates and attempts to rape her. However, while Nyu falls asleep, Lucy wakes up. He then removes a wig to show her his horns and also reveals that he was the one responsible for releasing Lucy at the research center. He attempts to solicit Lucy with the promise of creating a new race of Diclonius together that will destroy the human race, but Lucy turns down his offer and instead beheads him.

== Other characters ==
=== Arakawa ===
Voiced by: Eriko Ishihara (Japanese); Jessica Boone (English)

Arakawa (荒川) is a young researcher in her early 20s who is also Professor Kakuzawa's partner who works alongside him to create a vaccine in order to counter the threat of the Diclonius virus. She, along with Kouta, inadvertently discovered Professor Kakuzawa's severed head and warned the boy not to disclose anything of what he saw or heard to anybody else. Afterwards, she reported her finding to Director Kakuzawa at his compound facility, but he would not let her go scot-free after seeing his son's horns. She was threatened by Chief Kakuzawa to take charge of his deceased son's research on the island and spread the virus or else be killed.

She eventually succeeds in creating the vaccine, just as the explosion releasing all the Diclonius on the island occurs. She is helped escape by a member of another government research facility, that specializes in vectors, but drops the vaccine. She is then saved again by more of that facilities members in a vector craft, a vehicle that uses artificially created vectors, using enlarged organs of Diclonius, can also cancel out other vectors and sense/show where Diclonius are. They take her deep into the island to retrieve the vaccine.

In the anime, Arakawa is a minor character whose role provides little or no contribution at all for advancing the plot, as later she's often seen complaining that being so busy does not allow her to take a shower, which becomes a recurrent gag in the series. However, her character eventually plays an important, key role for humanity's salvation in the last story arc of the manga.

=== Kanae ===
Voiced by: Maria Yamamoto (Japanese); Monica Rial (English)

Kanae (カナエ) is Kouta's deceased younger sister. Kanae was protective of her brother and became jealous whenever other girls showed him attention. At a festival, Kanae watched as Lucy killed several people around her. Kanae claims that she saw Lucy killing people using her vectors, which are normally unseen to the human eye; unlike everyone else, who did not connect Lucy and the deaths, and were led to believe it was a bomb.

She is later brutally murdered by Lucy before her father, on the train leaving Kamakura. After that, Kouta and Kanae's father comes over to see what is happening, unaware his daughter has died, before he is also murdered by Lucy. However the trauma of witnessing their murders causes Kouta to repress his memories of the events; in the manga, he believes that Kanae was killed in a car accident, whereas in the anime he believes that she simply got sick and died (and that their father died in a car accident). It is only after witnessing Lucy brutally murder a group of soldiers in front of him, with her vectors, that his repressed memories emerge.

=== Kisaragi ===
Voiced by: Maria Yamamoto (Japanese); Tiffany Grant (English)

Kisaragi (如月) is Kurama's personal secretary, who seems to space out at work often and is often quite clumsy. Kisaragi was taken hostage by Lucy at the start of the series, while walking down the hall. Since Kurama's men were unable to get a clear shot of Lucy, Kurama told Kisaragi they had to sacrifice her. Kisaragi did not seem upset after hearing this, instead saying she was happy to give her life if it meant she was helping. Kurama assured her that her death would not be meaningless, but before Kurama could tell his men to shoot, Lucy tore off Kisaragi's head. After using Kisaragi's decapitated body as a shield and killing the men, Lucy told Kurama that Kisaragi's death was meaningless, and left laughing. After she is killed, Kurama picks up her severed head and vows to avenge her death. She is briefly seen later in a flashback, indicating that she has worked for Kurama for many years.

In the anime she trips in front of the rampaging Lucy, who tears off her head and uses the body to shield herself from the security team's gunfire. Kurama keeps a picture of her (along with those of Nana and his deceased wife) on his desk, even after her death.

=== Saito ===
Voiced by: Maria Yamamoto (Japanese); Allison Sumrall (English)

Saito (斎藤, Saitō) is Mariko's foster mother, in her mid-twenties, and one of the scientists working at Chief Kakuzawa's compound facility. Although she has never actually seen Mariko in person, every day for over 5 years, she and the Diclonius girl have been verbally interacting with each other through the use of loudspeakers. Mariko always referred to Saito as "Mother" during these interactions.

When Shirakawa and the scientists were forced to release Mariko from her confinement tank, which she had been sealed in all of her life, they pondered their options as how to make her submit to their commands. Saito was the first to volunteer in greeting Mariko in an attempt to appease her, mistakenly believing that by allowing herself to be seen by Number 35 would help to identify herself as the Diclonius' mother. Saito, who is always smiling, believes she is in no danger and looks forward to finally meeting Mariko face to face. Shirakawa agrees to let Saito meet Mariko, believing that Mariko views Saito as her parent and that she would never do anything to hurt her.

At first the reunion went as expected: Mariko overjoyed seeing her "mother" for the first time ever, and Saito happy to meet her "daughter" for the first time, Saito immediately felt pity for the Diclonius upon watching the abysmal condition of her body: dehydrated, undernourished, atrophied, and unable to walk. Mariko collapses as she attempts to walk, and after Saito removes the bandages covering Mariko's body, she comforts her in her arms. However, then Mariko's murderous instincts kick in, and when she sees Saito's face for the first time, she says that this person is not her mother. She then uses her vectors to rip her torso off and throws it through the window of the control room, preventing the guard from detonating the bomb implanted in her body. Mariko then propels herself with her vectors toward Shirakawa, ready to brutally kill her. Saito, only moments from death, detonates the bomb in Mariko's arm, effectively stopping her from any further destruction. Later, Isobe realizes that Saito lied to Mariko about neither of her parents wanting or loving her, and thinks this was a manipulative attempt to put Mariko more under her direct control. Isobe thinks poorly of her as a result.

=== Shirakawa ===
Voiced by: Hitomi Nabatame (Japanese); Shelley Calene-Black (English)

Shirakawa (白河) is a scientist in her mid-30s who works very closely with Kurama at the Diclonius research facility. Though her personality on the surface reflects a business-like demeanor, she holds a secret affection and genuine concern for Kurama and on all the matters related with his mysterious past. However, Kurama does not return the feelings because most of his time he focuses on attempting to find and terminate Lucy, therefore, keeping the relationship strictly professional.

She is revealed to be a spy sent by the Japanese government, which is suspicious of Chief Kakuzawa, who, however, seems to be one or more steps ahead of her. In order to gain info she is servile and submissive to Director Kakuzawa, allowing him to molest and sexually humiliate her. It is also revealed she has feelings for Kurama and begins to admit it, even confessing that she recommended the harsh method of controlling Mariko out of jealousy. Before she can aid Kurama in saving Mariko, she is decapitated by Lucy.

In the anime she sympathizes with Kurama after the Director orders that Nana be terminated - as Nana says goodbye to Kurama after he gives her a sedative, Shirakawa who is watching, is forced to leave, as she cannot keep from crying. In episode 11, Shirakawa attempts to protect Kouta from both Mariko and Lucy, but is sliced in half at the waist by Lucy; in her final moments, she hopes that Kurama will forgive her for failing to stop Lucy. This manner of execution awakens Kouta's lost memories of how Lucy killed his family.

=== Aiko Takada ===
Voiced by: Maria Yamamoto (Japanese); Allison Sumrall (English)

Aiko Takada (高田愛子, Takada Aiko) is Lucy's friend three years prior to the start of the main story, though her full name is never revealed. She becomes the second human who has both given love and come to accept Lucy by who she is, regardless of her horns. She always saw Lucy on the playground and liked to sketch her, as she wanted to be an artist. She lives with her abusive father (who does not want her to be an artist) and his girlfriend. She becomes good friends with Lucy and tells her how her mother is an artist and traveled abroad. She says there is a large art exhibition in town and suspects that her mother might have returned for it, and that she wants to give her a drawing she made for her. When Lucy goes to see Aiko, she accidentally killed her father when he was about to stab the drawing with a knife, she pushed him and he cut his own throat. Knowing the police would come, she and Lucy run off to the art museum so Aiko could deliver the picture to her mother before they are caught.

Unfortunately, the exhibit is closed at the time and Kurama and his group show up to catch the girls. Kurama sneaks up on the girls and fires, Aiko pushes Lucy out of the way and is shot. Kurama then promises Aiko's well-being in exchange for Lucy's capture. Lucy agrees and is later shown confronted by Kurama, while held under restraints as he tells her that Aiko died at the hospital from her injuries. The death of Aiko serves as the last straw for Lucy to become resolved to kill everyone in Kurama's life. In the series' final chapter, Wanta walks past a poster of Aiko, announcing her recent art exhibit, possibly implying that Kurama may have lied about Aiko's death. It is possible that this is instead a poster for Aiko's mother, holding an exhibition again in Kamakura many years after her daughter's death.

This story is told in the series' OVA, but with some changes.
