= Kimi to Boku =

Japanese manga series

- Cover of the first tankōbon volume

君と僕。 (Kimi to Boku.)
- Genre: Comedy, slice of life
- Manga
- Written by: Kiichi Hotta
- Published by: Square Enix
- Imprint: Gangan Comics
- Magazine: Monthly Shōnen Gangan (2003–2004); Gangan Powered (2004–2009); Monthly GFantasy (2009–2022)
- Original run: January 2003 – March 18, 2022
- Volumes: 18
- Anime television series
- Directed by: Mamoru Kanbe
- Produced by: Shinnosuke Wada; Shuko Yokoyama; Yuji Matsukura
- Written by: Reiko Yoshida
- Music by: Masato Nakayama
- Studio: J.C.Staff
- Licensed by: Crunchyroll
- Original network: TXN (TV Tokyo)
- Original run: October 4, 2011 – December 27, 2011
- Episodes: 13
- Anime television series

Kimi to Boku 2
- Directed by: Mamoru Kanbe
- Produced by: Shinnosuke Wada; Shuko Yokoyama; Yuji Matsukura
- Written by: Reiko Yoshida
- Music by: Masato Nakayama
- Studio: J.C.Staff
- Licensed by: Crunchyroll
- Original network: TV Tokyo
- Original run: April 3, 2012 – June 26, 2012
- Episodes: 13

Kimi to Boku (Japanese: 君と僕。; lit. 'You and I') is a Japanese manga series written and illustrated by Kiichi Hotta. It was serialized in Square Enix's shōnen manga magazine Monthly Shōnen Gangan from January 2003 to 2004, in Gangan Powered from 2004 to 2009, and in Monthly GFantasy from May 2009 to March 2022. The series follows four teens, Yūta and Yūki Asaba, Shun Matsuoka, and Kaname Tsukahara, who grew up together and a half-Japanese transfer student Chizuru Tachibana who joins the circle of friends. An anime television series adaptation by J.C.Staff aired from October to December 2011 and a second season aired from April to June 2012.

== Plot ==
The story revolves around four teens—the attractive twins Yūta and Yūki Asaba, the effeminate Shun Matsuoka, and the class head Kaname Tsukahara—who have known each other since early childhood. While they are not necessarily close friends, they continue to hang out well into high school. The half-Japanese transfer student Chizuru Tachibana joins the circle of friends in this comedy about the everyday life. It does not have any romance or fantasy, but it is a light-hearted, humorous story about high school friends and attachments. Friendships form because the group loves each other's company, even with all their different personalities and perspectives. Yūta and Yūki are known for giving everyone a hard time but usually mean no harm, Shun with his elegant behavior, Kaname with his hot temper, and Chizuru and his fun-loving side, build this anime storyline about adolescence and growing up.

== Characters ==
Yūta Asaba (浅羽 悠太, Asaba Yūta)
Voiced by: Koki Uchiyama (anime), Yuki Kaida (drama CD)
The elder twin brother of Asaba twins who studies at Homare High School. His differentiating feature from his younger brother is his centre divided bangs, as well as wearing the usual school uniform in the winter. Yūta and his brother are identical and are both popular among girls. Due to him helping others without thinking of himself, Yūta became popular during Elementary School. Though both come off as monotoned and passive, Yūta expresses himself more than his younger twin. He is also more mature than Yūki and the others, and though he rarely voices his entire thought process, he is very observant. He cares deeply for his brother, and he does not want to make choices for him. He is in the same class as Shun. Aside from Yūki, Yūta cares for Shun, as do the rest of the group. Together with Shun, he is a member of the tea ceremony club. During junior high, he joined the kendo club—a considerably skilled swordsman and he can run fast too. He is called "Yūtan" by Chizuru.
Yūki Asaba (浅羽 祐希, Asaba Yūki)
Voiced by: Ryōhei Kimura (anime), Junko Minagawa (drama CD)
The younger twin brother who also studies at the same school as Yūta. His bangs are down. Same as his brother Yūta, he enjoys annoying Kaname with their constantly dry remarks. He has a hobby of reading manga and anime magazines; his favorite magazine is "Animeja". He played a numbers game which he called, "Mission" at a local game center and eventually became good at games. He is talented in many things, like cooking, basketball and judo, but he does not particularly enjoy any of them, only putting effort into things if there's something in it for him. He constantly makes trouble with his indifferent personality. When walking together, he will often rest his head on Yūta's shoulder. He is not particularly interested in either study and sport. His notes are always very close to the red-mark, which is only prevented by reading Yūta's notes early in the mornings before exams. He is popular with girls, but has an awkward situation with them, as he is weak to perfume and make-up scents, which make him nauseous. He later is shown to have feelings for Kayo, a former cafeteria lady at Homare. He was forced into joining the manga club by his friends. He is in the same class with Chizuru and Kaname. He seems to be aware that Chizuru likes Masaki. Chizuru calls him "Yukki".
Shun Matsuoka (松岡 春, Matsuoka Shun)
Voiced by: Toshiyuki Toyonaga (anime), Minami Takayama (drama CD), Rie Kugimiya (drama CD, young)
Shun has been girly since he was in kindergarten, which resulted in many people mistaking him for a girl (including Chizuru). This was compounded early in the series by the fact that he had long hair which Yūki and Yūta eventually cut. Shun likes to use keigo and he is usually the one who tries to calm down situations. He cried often as a young child. Despite his otome-like nature, he is quite slow in things like love. He has two older sisters and one younger brother. He is the only iyashikei or "some who makes others feel cheerful" of the group. Chizuru calls him "Shun-chan".
Kaname Tsukahara (塚原 要, Tsukahara Kaname)
Voiced by: Yūki Ono (anime), Kenichi Suzumura (drama CD), Yumi Uchiyama (drama CD, young)
The glasses guy of the group. He is the top of the class, a Student Council member, and the Class Representative of their class. He is in the same class as Yūki and Chizuru. He is the wealthiest among his friends as often pointed out by Yūta and Yūki. He has a short temper and often gets mad by his friends' foolish actions. Kaname was in love with his kindergarten teacher, Kaori-sensei, which the twins enjoy teasing him about and wanted to be like a guy named Kōichi, who later became his high school teacher, Azuma-sensei. He also seems to have a crush on his neighbor Hisako's elder sister Shizuna. Chizuru often calls him "Kanamecchi".
Chizuru Tachibana (橘 千鶴, Tachibana Chizuru)
Voiced by: Miyu Irino (anime), Junko Takeuchi (drama CD)
The half-Japanese transfer student from Germany. For a half foreigner, he is quite short and has a complex about his height. He is noisy, cheerful and a bit of an idiot. He also made nicknames for the boys and Masaki. With Yūki, Chizuru often makes Kaname mad and usually ends up getting hit by him. Some years ago he came to Japan for a short time and met Yūki at a park. As a little kid he did not know any Japanese, but when he later moved to Japan during the second year of high school he was already fluent in Japanese. Chizuru likes girls but has no experience with them. He has a crush on Masaki.
Masaki Satō (佐藤 茉咲, Satō Masaki)
Voiced by: Miyuki Satō (anime), Chiwa Saitō (drama CD)
A first year student who bullied Shun for some days. She seems to have a little crush on him after he helped her. Shun is the only person she smiles and is friendly to. She has a small figure and has cute, fluffy hair, resulting in Chizuru nicknaming her "Mary" because she reminds him of a sheep. Just as Shun is oblivious to Masaki's crush on him, Masaki was oblivious to Chizuru's crush on her, until he confessed.

== Media ==
=== Manga ===
Written and illustrated by Kiichi Hotta, Kimi to Boku began its serialization in Square Enix's shōnen manga magazine Monthly Shōnen Gangan in January 2003. It moved to Gangan Powered in 2004; it moved again to Monthly GFantasy on May 18, 2009, after Gangan Powered ceased publication. The series ended serialization on March 18, 2022, with 18 volumes.

=== Anime ===
The episodes in the anime are based from the manga series by Kiichi Hotta. An anime television adaption of Kimi to Boku was announced in the April 2011 issue of Monthly GFantasy. The series was produced by J.C.Staff under the direction of Mamoru Kanbe with scripts supervised by Reiko Yoshida and music by Masato Nakayama at Elements Garden and began its broadcast run starting October 4, 2011. The series (also released in English under the title You and Me) was split into two 13-episode seasons. The second season's theme song, "Zutto", is sung by Nico Nico Douga singer, ShonenT, under his real name Tomohisa Sako. Crunchyroll licensed the series outside of Asia.
