= Sakura Wars: The Animation =

2020 anime television series

- Key visual for the series
- 新サクラ大戦 the Animation
- Genre: Adventure, science fiction
- Created by: Oji Hiroi; Sega
- Developed by: Manabu Ono; Tatsuhiko Urahata
- Directed by: Manabu Ono
- Music by: Kohei Tanaka
- Country of origin: Japan
- Original language: Japanese
- No. of episodes: 12

Production
- Producers: Naoto Kase; Takahiro Hirano; Di Yao
- Animator: Sanzigen
- Production companies: Sammy; Sega; Tencent Japan

Original release
- Network: Tokyo MX, BS11
- Release: April 3 – June 19, 2020

Sakura Wars: The Animation (Note: Known in Japan as New Sakura Wars: The Animation (Japanese: 新サクラ大戦 the Animation, Hepburn: Shin Sakura Taisen: Ji Animēshon)) is a Japanese anime television series directed by Manabu Ono, written by Ono and Tatsuhiko Urahata, and produced by Sanzigen. The series is based on the setting and story of the 2019 video game Sakura Wars, and takes place after the events of the game. Set in 1941, the series follows the adventures of Seijuro Kamiyama and the Imperial Combat Revue. The series ran on Tokyo MX and BS11 from April 3 to June 19, 2020, and is streamed in North America by Funimation. It is scheduled to be released in four Blu-ray and DVD compilations by Pony Canyon, with the first two being released on June 17, 2020. In Asia-Pacific, the series is licensed by Medialink and released on Ani-One YouTube channel.

== Plot ==
Sakura Wars the Animation is set in a fictionalized version of 1941 (one year after the events of the video game) during the Shōwa era and follows the adventures of the Imperial Combat Revue, a military unit dedicated to fighting supernatural threats against Tokyo while maintaining their cover as a theater troupe. With its captain Seijuro Kamiyama absent, Sakura Amamiya temporarily assumes command. Following an incident in Europe, Kamiyama takes a young Russian girl named Klara M. Ruzhkova and leaves her in the Flower Division's care. However, Moscow Combat Revue captain Valery Kaminski is sent to Tokyo to retrieve Klara and the Flower Division must stop him.

== Cast ==
Character	Voice actor	
Character	Japanese	English
Seijuro Kamiyama	Yōhei Azakami	Ian Sinclair
Sakura Amamiya	Ayane Sakura	Cherami Leigh
Hatsuho Shinonome	Maaya Uchida	Amber Lee Connors
Azami Mochizuki	Hibiku Yamamura	Sarah Wiedenheft
Anastasia Palma	Ayaka Fukuhara	Stephanie Young
Clarissa "Claris" Snowflake	Saori Hayami	Amanda Gish
Sumire Kanzaki	Michie Tomizawa	Michelle Ruff
Komachi Oba	Ryōko Shiraishi	Tia Ballard
Kaoru Rindo	Yui Ishikawa	Monica Rial
Reiji Shiba	Tomokazu Sugita	Zeno Robinson
Itsuki Saijo	Mayu Yoshioka	Alexis Tipton
Hiromi Hongo	Haruka Terui	Caitlin Glass
Hakushu Murasame	Miyuki Sawashiro	Luci Christian
Yui Huang	Sumire Uesaka	Kate Bristol
Arthur	Nobunaga Shimazaki	Stephen Fu
Lancelot	Manami Numakura	Felecia Angelle
Elise	Nana Mizuki	Emily Neves
Klara M. Ruzhkova	Misaki Watada	Lindsay Seidel
Leyla M. Ruzhkova	Haruka Shiraishi	Terri Doty
Valery Kaminski	Kenji Akabane	Aaron Dismuke
Natalia Ruzhkova	Mayuno Yasokawa	Jessica Cavanagh

== Episodes ==
No.	Title (Note: All English titles are taken from Funimation.)	Original air date
1	"The Curtain Rises! The New Combat Revue"; Transliteration: "Dōdō Kaimaku! Shinsei Kagekidan" (Japanese: 堂々開幕! 新生華撃団)	April 3, 2020
A masked person in a white cape battles with a demon girl over the possession of a young girl, but they are both forced to withdraw when Flower Division captain Seijuro Kamiyama intervenes. In order to protect the girl, Klara M. Ruzhkova, Seijuro takes her to Japan to be an apprentice member of the Imperial Combat Revue. He explains to the members of the Flower Division that Klara is the apparent sole survivor of the Moscow Combat Revue, who have gone missing after their airship was mysteriously shot down. However, Klara has lost her memories due to the crash, so there still no leads in the case. Demons suddenly attack Tokyo, but are quickly defeated when the Flower Division mobilizes. Seijuro leaves Klara in the Flower Division's care while he leaves to further investigate the Moscow Combat Revue's disappearance. As Seijuro leaves, a masked figure spies on the Imperial Combat Revue.
2	"Identity Unknown! A Mysterious Foe Appears"; Transliteration: "Shōtai Fumei! Nazo no Kaijin Arawaru" (Japanese: 正体不明! 謎の怪人現る)	April 10, 2020
The next day, the masked person with the white cape, nicknamed the "White Cape" by the people of Tokyo, is seen abducting a young boy. At the Theater, Sakura Amamiya takes it upon herself to take care of Klara, and gives her a tour of the Theater and introduces her to the members of the Imperial Combat Revue. As Sakura shows Klara around the city, they are attacked by a black caped figure who attempts to kidnap Klara. The rest of the Flower Division and White Cape arrive and help drive off Black Cape, who is revealed to be a robot when Sakura slashes its chest open. Sakura then attempts to chase White Cape but runs into her sword teacher Hakushu Murasame, who says she has seen White Cape flee in a different direction. Back at the Theater, the Flower Division ponders why Black Cape is after Klara when a massive airship appears over Tokyo. The airship then announces that it is the Sevastapol, carrying the Moscow Combat Revue.
3	"Tokyo Trembles! The New Moscow Combat Revue!"; Transliteration: "Teito Gekishin! Shinsei Mosukuba Kagekidan" (Japanese: 帝都激震! 新生莫斯科華撃団)	April 17, 2020
The captain of the Moscow Combat Revue, Valery Kaminski, arrives at the Theater to meet the Imperial Combat Revue. When Sakura points out they were told the Moscow Combat Revue was destroyed, Valery admits that their airship was shot down. However, they managed to survive and were revived as the New Moscow Combat Revue. Valery demands the return of Klara, since she is a member of his Revue. However, Klara refuses to join him, prompting the Flower Division to side with her. Sumire Kanzaki, the revue's commander, also points out that they cannot hand over Klara without Seijuro's approval. Valery decides to back off, planning to wait for the WLOF to step in. A large demon attacks Tokyo and the Flower Division deploys to stop it. However, the demon proves too powerful for the Flower Division to defeat, and Hatsuho Shinonome's overconfidence gets her Mugen disabled. Before the demon can finish off Hatsuho, the Moscow Combat Revue intervenes, easily destroying the demon and humiliating the Flower Division.
4	"Friendship in Full Bloom! Thousand Year Cherry Blossoms!"; Transliteration: "Yūjō Mankai! Senbonzakura" (Japanese: 友情満開! 千年桜)	April 24, 2020
Frustrated at her poor performance against the demon, Hatsuho decides to return to her family shrine. Concerned, Sakura takes Klara there to check on her. Along the way, Sakura explains that she and Hatsuho are childhood friends, so they've always been very close. Meanwhile, Azami Mochizuki begins investigating Klara and secretly follows her and Sakura. At the shrine, Hatsuho reflects on her insubordination in the previous battle, and wonders why she feels jealous that Sakura was put in charge in Seijuro's absence. Sakura and Klara then arrive and help Hatsuho prepare for a festival at the shrine. During the festival, Klara begins recovering some of her memories. Hatsuho later reveals to Sakura that the cherry blossom tree that they used to play under hasn't bloomed ever since they had an argument as children. Inspired by Sakura and Hatsuho's friendship, Klara uses a mysterious power that causes the cherry blossom tree to bloom again, surprising Sakura and Hatsuho. Azami, who also witnessed the event, notes the power seems to be coming from Klara's left eye.
5	"The Goofball Detective Combo! Find Klara's Secret!"; Transliteration: "Ōtotsu Tantei! Kurāra no Himitsu wo Sagure" (Japanese: 凸凹探偵! クラーラの秘密を探れ)	May 1, 2020
Having witnessed Klara using her power, Azami is convinced that she is somehow involved in the incident that almost destroyed Moscow Combat Revue and therefore a potential threat to the Imperial Combat Revue. She recruits Clarissa "Claris" Snowflake to help her investigate and they quietly spy on Klara's movements. However, all they find out is that Klara is secretly taking care of a kitten she had adopted. Meanwhile, Valery once again requests to Sumire that she hand over Klara, but is refused until the WLOF gives specific orders. Azami and Claris then follow Klara into an alley where she is attacked by a demon. THe demon proves to be resistant against Azami's weapons and Claris' magic, but Klara helps power up one of Claris' spells, allowing her to destroy the demon. Black Cape then attempts to kidnap Klara, but is thwarted by White Cape and both figures as Sakura and Hatsuho arrive. Later, Azami deduces that Klara has a special ability that enhances other people's spiritual power. Both she and Claris no longer consider Klara a threat and decide to protect her.
6	"Strange and Bizarre! The True Identity of Black Cape!"; Transliteration: "Kikikaikai! Kuro Manto no Shōtai" (Japanese: 奇々怪々！黒マントの正体)	May 8, 2020
One morning, Hakushu arrives at the Theater and asks for Sakura's help in cleaning a storage room at an orphanage she frequents. Both Sakura and Klara accompany Hakushu to the orphanage, where one of the orphans, Naoya, is the boy that was abducted by White Cape. Meanwhile, Valery keeps track of Klara's movements and is shocked when he recognizes Hakushu. Black Cape then attacks the orphanage, but the Flower Division mobilizes in their Mugen to fight it. Outmatched, Black Cape transforms into a massive golem-like creature. White Cape then arrives and instructs the Flower Division to destroy Black Cape's crystal core in its chest, which they achieve. The destruction of the core causes Black Cape to explode. Klara witnesses the explosions, which triggers her memories and causes her distress. Back at the Theater, Hakushu admits she brought Sakura and Klara to the orphanage as bait to draw out Black Cape. She then takes her leave, satisfied to know that Klara has chosen to stay with the Imperial Combat Revue. Meanwhile, Valery recalls the aftermath of the explosion that destroyed the Moscow Combat Revue's previous airship, where he witnessed an angelic being emerge from a large blue crystal before it flew away.
7	"Stealth Mission! Tail the Date!"; Transliteration: "Onmitsu Sakusen! Dēto o oe" (Japanese: 隠密作戦！デートを追え)	May 15, 2020
Seijuro returns to Tokyo and reveals to Sumire that there are no existing public records showing that Valery was part of the Moscow Combat Revue, and all relevant WLOF files were destroyed by Director A, suggesting some sort of conspiracy. In addition, there is evidence a prototype Kobu was taken to Moscow. Concerned, Sumire assigns a new mission to Seijuro. That night, Seijuro tells Sakura that he needs to return to Europe to conduct more investigations, but he can spend a day with her as thanks for leading the Flower Division in his absence. The next day, Seijuro, Sakura, and Klara leave the Theater together. Valery and Klara's older sister Leyla M. Ruzhkova Ruzhkova decide to follow them. Meanwhile, the rest of the Imperial Combat Revue believes Seijuro is going on a date with Sakura and vow to sabotage the date. Sakura encounters Hakushu, who warns her she's being tailed. Being cautious, the group starts taking precautions to shake their pursuers. Valery and Leyla try to pursue but end up falling into a river, while the Imperial Combat Revue members lose interest when they realize Klara is with Seijuro and Sakura so they aren't on a date. Safe from pursuit, Seijuro, Sakura, and Klara enjoy the rest of the day together. At the Theater, Sumire receives a mysterious letter.
8	"No End to the Chaos! The Combat Revue Challenge!"; Transliteration: "Haranbanjō! Kagekidan Taisen" (Japanese: 波乱万丈！華撃団大戦)	May 22, 2020
Leyla recalls when she first met Valery, where it is revealed she is in fact an angel-like being. Later, the Imperial Combat Revue is forced to answer a challenge by the Moscow Combat Revue to determine Klara's fate, though Sumire notes that the Imperial Combat Revue has no choice since refusing would hurt their reputation. The first match is a dance competition. Hatsuho starts with a traditional Shinto dance, but Leyla answers with a ballet and secures her the win. The second match is an obstacle court, but Valery voluntarily forfeits so that he can give the Imperial Combat Revue a handicap. The third and last match is a mock battle between the two teams. However, the Moscow Combat Revue cheats and uses real weapons to incapacitate the Flower Division. Sakura attempts to protect Klara, and Leyla reveals her black angel wings before knocking Sakura off a tower. This triggers Klara to transform into her true form, growing white angel wings. Valery claims triumph as he believes Klara is a savior from God who will destroy the world and rebuild it. Ashamed of her true nature, Klara flies away despite Sakura's pleas.
9	"Unbelievable! The Truth About Klara!"; Transliteration: "Kyōtendōchi! Kurāra no Shinjitsu" (Japanese: 驚天動地！クラーラの真実)	May 29, 2020
In the aftermath of the battle, the Sevastapol hides underwater where Valery orders Leyla to track down Klara. Leyla begins to have doubts about Valery's motives, but is mind controlled through a crystal Valery wields. Klara awakens at the orphanage, where Hakushu reveals it is a shelter for both human and demon children and that she will be safe among them. Seijuro reports back to Sumire, telling her his investigation has revealed that all of the members of the original Moscow Combat Revue were killed in their airship crash, meaning the Moscow Combat Revue led by Valery are impostors. Furthermore, he discovered that Russia had been experimenting in creating human/demon hybrids called Nadezhda of which only two, Leyla and Klara, are known to exist. Valery was one of the scientists involved in the experiments, and he recruited Leyla and tried to take Klara. Meanwhile, Leyla tracks down Klara and abducts her. The Flower Division and White Cape intercept her, with White Cape revealing her true identity as Hakushu. Klara decides to stay with the Imperial Combat Revue, but Valery begins bombarding the area with the Sevastapol's guns, distracting them long enough for Leyla to escape with Klara.
10	"The Destruction of Tokyo? The Rage of Tunguska!"; Transliteration: "Teito Kaimetsu? Tsungūsuka no Ikari" (Japanese: 帝都壊滅？ツングースカの怒り)	June 5, 2020
The Flower Division is left reeling in the wake of the previous battle, with all of their Mugen heavily damaged while Sakura's is completely destroyed. Meanwhile, Valery connects Klara to the core of the Sevastapol, using it to power a massive energy cannon. He demonstrates its power by destroying a mountain just outside of Tokyo and gives the world governments and ultimatum: disband and recognize him as a ruler or be destroyed. Seijuro kills one of the WLOF directors, revealing him to be Valery's robotic mole in the organization. Despite Valery's threats, the Flower Division decides to mobilize to save Klara, with Sakura choosing to mobilize in an older Type-3 Kobu to replace her destroyed one. The Flower Division and Hakushu board the Sevastapol and begin to battle the defenders, but Sakura's Type-3 Kobu breaks down. Seeing Sakura's determination to save Klara, Sumire authorizes her to use the more advanced Obu, even though there is a risk it might drain Sakura's spirit energy and kill her. She manages to successfully activate the Obu and annihilates the remaining defenders, swearing to save Klara.
11	"A Fantastic, Tragic Love! Leyla's Heart!"; Transliteration: "Hiren Gensō! Reira no Omoi" (Japanese: 悲恋幻想！レイラの想い)	June 12, 2020
The Flower Division fights their way to the core of the Sevastapol where they confront Valery and Leyla. Valery reveals that he discovered a blue crystal that crashed to Earth that Hakushu apparently emerged from, and by touching and absorbing the crystal, he has become immortal and gifted with supernatural powers. Seeing the corruption in human society, he had decided to use Klara's power to rule the world as its new God, despite the fact he is the one who killed the members of the original Moscow Combat Revue with the Sevastapol during activation before he killed the scientists. He then attempts to force the Flower Division to join him by threatening to destroy Tokyo, but Hakushu sabotages the main cannon. Leyla battles the Flower Division as Valery repairs the cannon but manages to overcome her brainwashing when her love for Klara overrides her loyalty to Valery. She frees Klara but is mortally wounded in the process. Shocked at the sight of Leyla's supposed death, Klara suffers an emotional breakdown and her powers begin to go out of control.
12	"The Grand Finale! Hope for Tomorrow!"; Transliteration: "Daidan'en! Ashita e no Kibō" (Japanese: 大団円! 明日への希望)	June 19, 2020
Sakura manages to calm Klara down, but Valery uses the power the Sevastapol absorbed from her to transform himself into a more powerful form. The Flower Division are outmatched until Seijuro arrives with the Shanghai, Berlin, and London Combat Revues, who shoot down the Sevastpol with their aerial battleships. Undeterred, Valery fuses himself with the Sevastapol and moves to attack Tokyo despite the Combat Revues' attempts to stop him. Klara then arrives in the experimental Tenjin and combines it with Sakura's Obu, giving them the power to break the shield protecting Valery while Leyla's spirit distracts and drains him, thus making him no longer immortal. Sakura then stabs and kills Valery with her katana through his chest, putting a stop to his plans. Afterwards, Klara becomes an official member of the Imperial Combat Revue and joins in their stage performances as Hakushu bids farewell. Meanwhile, Leyla, who has apparently survived, finds a crystal fragment at the wreckage of the Sevastapol that opens a portal to Shadow Tokyo.
