= Mayuno Yasokawa =

Japanese actress and voice actress (born 1965)

- 八十川真由野
- Born: February 11, 1965 (age 61); Kanagawa Prefecture, Japan
- Occupations: Actress; Voice actress
- Height: 157 cm (5 ft 2 in)

Mayuno Yasokawa (八十川真由野, Yosokawa Mayuno; born February 11, 1965) is a Japanese actress and voice actress affiliated with Bungakuza.

== Filmography ==
=== Anime television series ===
2008

- Golgo 13, Miranda.
- Yatterman, Kokohore Shaberu.

2009

- Inuyasha: The Final Act, Yuka's Mother.

2010

- Sound of the Sky, Naomi.

2014

- Barakamon, Tama's mother.

2020

- Sakura Wars: The Animation, Natalia Ruzhkova.

=== Anime films ===
- Howl's Moving Castle, (2004) Honey Hatter.
- Garasu no Usagi, (2005) Kayoko.
- Tales from Earthsea, (2006).
- Legend of the Millennium Dragon, (2011) Misaki Tendou.
- High Speed! Free! Starting Days, (2015) Haruka's mother.
- Eureka Seven Hi-Evolution, (2017) Saorise McKenzie.
- Violet Evergarden the Movie, (2020) Yuris's Mother.

=== Dubbing ===
Live-action

- 9/11 (Eve Cage (Gina Gershon))
- A Dark Truth (Morgan Deborah Kara Unger))
- Air (Abby (Sandrine Holt))
- An American Crime (Gertrude (Catherine Keener))
- Assault on Precinct 13 (Alex Sabian (Maria Bello))
- Audrey Hepburn (Clémence Bouluke)
- August Rush (Lizzy (Bonnie McKee))
- A View to a Kill (Stacey Sutton (Tanya Roberts))
- Before I Fall (Samantha's Mother (Jennifer Beals))
- Birthday Girl (Nadia played (Nicole Kidman))
- Blood Work (Ms. Cordell (Alix Koromzay))
- Bridge of Spies (Mary Donovan Amy Ryan))
- The Book of Eli (Claudia (Jennifer Beals))
- Cinderella Man (Sarah Wilson (Rosemarie DeWitt))
- Close Encounters of the Third Kind (Jillian Guiler (Melinda Dillon))
- The Curious Case of Benjamin Button (Caroline (Julia Ormond))
- The Darkness (Bronny Taylor (Radha Mitchell))
- Daddy-Long-Legs (Yeon-woo (Park Eun-hye))
- The Day the Earth Stood Still (Helen Benson (Jennifer Connelly))
- Disclosure Day (Sister Maura (Elizabeth Marvel))
- Don't Say a Word (Aggie Conrad (Famke Janssen))
- Dummy (Lorena (Vera Farmiga))
- Empire of the Wolves (Anna (Arly Jover))
- The Fatal Encounter (Lady Hyegyeong (Kim Sung-ryung))
- Firestarter (Jane Hollister (Gloria Reuben))
- Freaky (Coral Kessler (Katie Finneran))
- I Am Legend (Zoe Neville (Salli Richardson))
- Infini (Whit Carmichael Daniel MacPherson))
- The Importance of Being Earnest (Gwendolen (Frances O'Connor))
- The Last House on the Left (Emma Collingwood (Monica Potter))
- Miracles from Heaven (Christy Beam (Jennifer Garner))
- No Man's Land (Jane Livingstone (Katrin Cartlidge))
- Orphan (Kate (Vera Farmiga))
- Pearl (Pearl's Mother (Tandi Wright))
- Perhaps Love (Sun Na (Zhou Xun))
- The Snowman, (Rakel Fauke (Charlotte Gainsbourg))
- Stillwater (Virginie (Camille Cottin))
- Sunshine Cleaning (Rose (Amy Adams))
- Surrogates (Jennifer Peters (Radha Mitchell))
- Tuesdays with Morrie (Janine Albom (Wendy Moniz))
- St.Vincent (Daka Parimova (Naomi Watts))
- You Only Live Twice (Aki (Akiko Wakabayashi))
- Winter's Tale (Virginia Gamely (Jennifer Lynn Connelly))

== Sources ==
- "Hauru no Ugoku Shiro – Credits". Nausicaa.net.
