= Sound of the Sky =

Japanese anime television series

- Promotional image released by Aniplex

ソ・ラ・ノ・ヲ・ト (Sora no Woto)
- Genre: Slice of life, war story
- Anime television series
- Directed by: Mamoru Kanbe
- Produced by: Fukashi Azuma; Takeshi Ochi
- Written by: Hiroyuki Yoshino
- Music by: Michiru Ōshima
- Studio: A-1 Pictures
- Licensed by: EU: Beez Entertainment; NA: Nozomi Entertainment
- Original network: TV Tokyo
- Original run: January 4, 2010 – March 22, 2010
- Episodes: 12
- Manga
- Written by: Paradores
- Illustrated by: Yagi Shinba
- Published by: ASCII Media Works
- Magazine: Dengeki Daioh
- Original run: January 2010 – June 2011
- Volumes: 2
- Video game

Sound of the Sky: Maiden Quintet
- Developer: Compile Heart
- Publisher: Compile Heart
- Genre: Music, Visual novel
- Platform: PlayStation Portable
- Released: May 27, 2010
- Original video animation
- Directed by: Mamoru Kanbe
- Written by: Hiroyuki Yoshino
- Music by: Michiru Ōshima
- Studio: A-1 Pictures
- Released: June 23, 2010 – September 22, 2010
- Runtime: 24–28 minutes
- Episodes: 2

Sound of the Sky (ソ・ラ・ノ・ヲ・ト, Sora no Woto) is a Japanese anime television series produced by A-1 Pictures and Aniplex and directed by Mamoru Kanbe. The 12-episode anime aired in Japan on the TV Tokyo television network between January 4, 2010, and March 22, 2010. The anime was also simulcast on Crunchyroll. Sound of the Sky was the debut project of Anime no Chikara. A manga adaptation illustrated by Yagi Shinba began serialization in the January 2010 issue of ASCII Media Works' Dengeki Daioh magazine. A visual novel developed by Compile Heart was released on the PlayStation Portable in May 2010.

== Plot ==
Sound of the Sky revolves around a young girl named Kanata Sorami who is inspired to join the military after witnessing a rendition of "Amazing Grace" by a mysterious trumpeter of the Helvetian Army. Becoming a bugler, she is assigned to the 1121st Platoon stationed in the town of Seize (inspired by Cuenca, Spain) in Helvetia (another name for Switzerland), where she is taken into the care of 2nd Lt. Filicia Heideman, M/Sgt. Rio Kazumiya and the rest of the 1121st Platoon. The story takes place in a post-apocalyptic world after a great war regressed humanity's technological capabilities back to early-to-mid 20th century standards.

== Characters ==
Kanata Sorami (空深 彼方, Sorami Kanata)
Voiced by: Hisako Kanemoto
Inspired by the song of a mysterious military trumpeter, 15-year-old Kanata joins the army as a bugler and is assigned to the 1121st Platoon. Despite being gifted with absolute pitch, Kanata initially lacks musical prowess, but gradually improves as the story progresses. She is portrayed as optimistic and cheerful, yet dedicated to her duties as a soldier and as a member of the platoon.
Rio Kazumiya (和宮 梨旺, Kazumiya Rio)
Voiced by: Yū Kobayashi
Rio is a 17-year-old Master Sergeant who is also a bugler and trumpeter, and the sole instructor of Kanata in learning military calls and signals. Rio is shown to have a no-nonsense attitude and is stricter in her discipline and the issuance of orders as compared to her commanding officer. Later in the story, she is revealed to be the half-sister of the late Princess Iliya, as well as the second heir to the Arkadia family. Due to her strained family history, she joined the 1121st as a means of escape, but later leaves in order to save the peace talks with the Roman Empire and prevent war. She is later promoted to Lieutenant upon rejoining the platoon after the war ends.
Filicia Heideman (フィリシア・ハイデマン, Firishia Haideman)
Voiced by: Aya Endō
The 18-year-old platoon leader of the 1121st with the rank of second lieutenant, Filicia tends to stray away from military convention, preferring to exercise a more casual leadership. Filicia does away with addressing rank with members in the platoon so that everyone is known on a first name basis. Her kindness and gentle nature is well known by the girls as she acts as a type of mother figure to them. Prior to her commission of the 1121st, Filicia was previously assigned to an active combat tank platoon of which she was the only survivor. She is later promoted to captain.
Kureha Suminoya (墨埜谷 暮羽, Suminoya Kureha)
Voiced by: Eri Kitamura
A private and the platoon's designated gunner, Kureha is the youngest of the girls in the 1121st at the age of 14. Kureha has a strong respect for military code and obeying orders. Her parents died when she was very young and she only knows of them through stories told by others. Her father was once a respected tank commander, and because of this, she took an immediate liking to Major Claus, having believed him to be the one and only "Desert Wolf".
Noël Kannagi (寒凪 乃絵留, Kannagi Noeru)
Voiced by: Aoi Yūki
The platoon's 15-year-old designated pilot and appointed mechanic with the rank of corporal, Noël is often portrayed as sleepy and tired, resulting in her falling asleep when in the company of others or in the middle of something. She spends most of the time repairing the platoon's battle tank, the Takemikazuchi, which is considered a technological relic from the previous age of prosperity. Initially, Noël is unsociable, but slowly breaks out of her mold due to Kanata's friendship. She was purportedly a genius in the Helvetian Academy, earning praise by military officials who used her to help them resurrect a bioweapon technology dubbed the Invisible Reaper. As a result of the terrible devastation and loss of life caused by such weapons, Noël was branded by the Romans with the moniker "Witch of Helvetia".
Yumina (ユミナ)
Voiced by: Misato Fukuen
Yumina is a priestess at the local church who looks after orphaned children. She also acts as a nurse when people fall ill and is fluent in the language of the Roman Empire, which in the story is presented as modern-day German.
Claus (クラウス, Kurausu)
Voiced by: Unshō Ishizuka
A commissioned officer holding the rank of Major, Claus is a despatch rider and close friend of the 1121st. He is mistakenly identified by Kureha as the "Desert Wolf" or "Miracle Claus", a tank commander of the same name and similar appearance who is renowned for his courage and service in the Helvetian army. Due to Kureha's admiration and awe for his supposed reputation, Claus finds it difficult to reveal the truth to her.
Naomi (ナオミ)
Voiced by: Mayuno Yasokawa
Naomi is the owner of a glassware shop who also acts as the front man for some of the 1121st Platoon's dubious activities, including an illegal alcohol distillery.
Mishio (ミシオ)
Voiced by: Mayuko Takahashi
Mishio is an orphaned girl under Yumina's care. She is very protective of who braids her hair, since her mother used to do it for her.
Seiya (セイヤ)
Voiced by: Mana Hirata
Seiya is an orphaned boy under Yumina's care. He is hostile towards soldiers, whom he blames for his parents' deaths, although his view of the soldiers at the Clocktower Fortress improve with the passing of time.
Iliya Arkadia (イリア・アルカディア, Iria Arukadia)
Voiced by: Ryoko Ono
The late first Princess of the Archduke of Arkadia and the half-sister of Rio, she died two years prior to the story. Iliya was the trumpeter of her squad and is known for her renditions of Amazing Grace, which at various times in the past had inspired members of the 1121st platoon.
Aisha Aldola (アーイシャ・アルドーラ, Āisha Arudōra)
Voiced by: Nami Miyahara
Aisha is a Roman scout that Kanata and Kureha discover unconscious and injured while on patrol. While in their care, the platoon quickly befriends her despite the language barrier (as she only speaks in her native tongue) and her status as the enemy. Aisha is revealed to be connected to Noël in the past, having been a survivor of the onslaught caused by the Invisible Reaper.
Shuko (シュコ)
Shuko is a northern white-faced owl that the girls find and decide to keep as embodiment of their mascot. He is thought to have been owned by Princess Iliya in the past.
Hopkins (ホプキンス, Hopukinsu)
Voiced by: Naoya Uchida
A feared Colonel of the Helvetian army, also known as the Demon of Vingt. His desire is actually to provoke war from the Roman Empire. He plans to do this by kidnapping and executing Aisha, but she escapes and is found by the 1121st Platoon, who foil his plans and end the war.

== Media ==
=== Manga ===
Before the anime's release, a manga adaptation illustrated by Yagi Shinba was serialized between the January 2010 and June 2011 issues of ASCII Media Works' Dengeki Daioh magazine. The story is written by Paradores who provided the original concept for Sound of the Sky. Two tankōbon volumes were released.

=== Anime ===
Sound of the Sky is the debut project of Anime no Chikara, a joint project of TV Tokyo's anime department and Aniplex aiming to assemble creators to develop original anime television series. The anime aired in Japan on TV Tokyo between January 5 and March 22, 2010, and it was also simulcast on Crunchyroll. The anime is produced by Aniplex, with animation produced handled by A-1 Pictures, and directed by Mamoru Kanbe. The screenplay is written by Hiroyuki Yoshino who based the story on Paradores' original concept. Character design is provided by Toshifumi Akai who based the designs on Mel Kishida's original concept. Music direction is led by Michiru Ōshima. The first BD/DVD compilation volume containing the first two episodes was released in Japan on March 24, 2010, distributed by Aniplex. Two original video animation episodes were released on the fourth and seventh BD/DVD volumes that were released in Japan on June 23 and September 22, 2010, respectively. At Anime Expo 2010, anime distributor Nozomi Entertainment had announced that they have licensed the series. They released the series in a series box set on July 5, 2011. At AmeCon 2010, European anime distributor Beez Entertainment announced that they have the distribution rights to the series.

Two pieces of theme music are used for the series: one opening theme and one ending theme. The opening theme is "Hikari no Senritsu" (光の旋律; lit. 'Melody of Light') by Kalafina and the single was released on January 20, 2010, by Sony Music Japan. The ending theme is "Girls, Be Ambitious." by Haruka Tomatsu and the single was released on January 27, 2010, by Music Ray'n. The anime's original soundtrack was released on March 24, 2010, by Aniplex.

==== Episodes ====
No.	Title	Original release date
1	"Resounding Sound: The City at Dawn" "Hibiku Oto: Futsugyō no Machi" (響ク音・払暁ノ街)	January 4, 2010
A young girl named Kanata Sorami joins the army with the hope of learning to become a good bugler. She is assigned to a place called Seize, which is currently holding a festival where people splash each other with water. She is found by her superior, Rio Kazumiya, who gives her a bath and tells her about the legend of the Fire Maidens. While looking at a bell owned by Rio's father, an owl steals it, forcing Rio to stop Kanata falling off the balcony trying to get it. As Rio participates in the festival, Kanata decides to search for the bell. She finds it hanging off a ledge, but when she goes to get it she falls into the lake, where she sees the golden skeleton of a winged creature. Stranded at the bottom of a canyon, she plays her bugle where she is responded to by Rio on her trumpet. She takes her to the Time Telling Fortress and plays the trumpet as the sun rises, introducing herself as Kanata's bugling teacher.
2	"First Battle: The Story of a Chair" "Uijin: Isu no Hanashi" (初陣・椅子ノ話)	January 11, 2010
During breakfast, Kanata is introduced to the other members of the 1121st Platoon; Filicia Heideman, Noël Kannagi and Kureha Suminoya. Kureha shows some hostility towards Kanata, but she is assigned to show her around the fort. When Kureha takes Kanata to see the tank of the squadron is housed, which is in the process of being repaired, Kureha expresses her depression because the military often ignores the squadron's existence. Later that night, Noël and Kanata claim they saw a ghost in the barracks, so Kanata and Kureha are sent to investigate. They learn the place used to be a school. Kureha laments that their platoon is in the middle of nowhere and is generally ignored. The two are surprised by an owl, the same one that stole Rio's bell, but with Kureha's help they manage to capture it. They decide to keep it and name it Shuko.
3	"The Squad's Day: Rio Runs" "Tai no Ichinichi: Rio Hashiru" (隊ノ一日・梨旺走ル)	January 18, 2010
As the others go to restock their supplies, Kanata spends the afternoon music training with Rio. Suddenly, Kanata comes down with a fever, reminding Rio of when her mother fell ill. Out of medicine, Rio gets help from a priestess named Yumina, who diagnoses her with three-day fever and treats her. When Kanata wakes up, she tells Rio that she has always been useless and has caused troubles for others. She also mentions to Rio that she always wanted to play a song, having heard it from a trumpeter she met when she was younger. Rio explains to her that there are many things of the past inside the tank Takemikazuchi, among which is "Amazing Grace", the song they both have heard, but played by a full orchestra. Rio explains that a squad, much like an orchestra, cannot be completed without a member.
4	"Rainy Season Sky: Quartz Rainbow" "Tsuyu no Sora: Hari no Niji" (梅雨ノ空・玻璃ノ虹)	January 25, 2010
Kanata goes with Noël to get more parts for their tank, the Takemikazuchi. They visit a glass works shop run by Naomi, the lady who helped Kanata when she first arrived, and she takes interest in a glass dolphin. Later on, they run into Yumina and a couple of kids. The boy, Seiya, gets angry at them, since he hates soldiers due to the death of his parents. Kanata and Noël head to a glass works factory, where they are having trouble replicating the optical lens needed for the tank. Kanata reassures Noël that it is not the machines that are good or bad, but the people who use them. After speaking with the workers, Carl and Maria, they give Kanata advice that allows her to become better at playing the bugle. This in turn helps Noël determine the effective lens samples by having Kanata check their pitch. The tank lens finally works and Noël smiles for the first time in a while.
5	"Mountain Hiking: The Ends of the World" "Yamafumi: Sekai no Hate" (山踏ミ・世界ノ果テ)	February 1, 2010
The squad take a 'field trip' to the mountains where some mechanical observers from the previous age need a maintenance check. Kanata, Kureha and Noël are forced to carry heavy backpacks on their hike up. While they find the first observer quickly, the next one lies at the top of a mountain. They take a break at a running river but soon return to find their backpacks ravaged of their food and their compass. Despite the hunger, they eventually manage to find the remaining observers. At the last observer, Filicia shows the others the signatures left by former members who had observed No Man's Land from that point. They are then taken to a hot spring where Rio, who had fought against a boar to get some bayberries, awaits.
6	"Kanata's Day Off: Hairdressing" "Kanata no Kyūjitsu: Kamiyui" (彼方ノ休日・髪結イ)	February 8, 2010
The group gives Kanata her paycheck early and she goes into town to spend it. In actuality, it is to get her out of the way while the others illegally trade calvados to make some money. When they get word from Naomi that some gangsters are planning to snoop in on the deal, they stage a mock shoot out to scare them off. Meanwhile, one of Yumina's orphans, Mishio, runs off when she objects to having her hair brushed. Kanata finds her at the market, where she reveals she is looking for a box that was taken from her after her mother died. Mishio nearly falls off a roof from the noise caused by the mock shoot out, but Kanata manages to save her before she falls, though it causes some boulders to fall that smash into the gangsters' car. While apologizing to Naomi, they notice the box Mishio had been looking for which the gangsters had picked up earlier at the town market. Mishio decides to give it to Yumina as a symbol of how much she cares for her.
7	"Showering Sound of Cicadas: Spirits Down the River" "Semishigure: Shōrōnagashi" (蝉時雨・精霊流シ)	February 15, 2010
Everyone prepares for Fiesta des Lumiéres, which starts to bring bad memories for Filicia, whose comrades were killed in a fierce battle. While wandering in the battlefield with a heavily wounded arm, she falls into a tunnel which was well buried under the ruin of the past civilization, and finds a corpse of a soldier of the old era. In a delusion, the corpse approaches her and apologizes for the war they could not win while humanity is falling apart. Filicia was rescued from the tunnel by someone named Princess Iliya. The girls later send off paper lanterns in the river and Filicia tells Rio her reason for living. Meanwhile, a priest recognizes Rio from somewhere.
7.5	"Feast: The Fortress at War" "Kyōen: Toride no Sensō" (饗宴・砦ノ戦争)	June 23, 2010 (OVA)
Rio, Filicia and Kureha have trouble keeping their illegal alcohol distillery a secret from both Kanata and Yumina. After giving everyone a special brew of tea, spiked with their home-made alcohol, Filicia suggests a mock battle using water guns that, if Kanata's team wins, she would be told the truth. Having gotten a little drunk from the alcohol, everyone gets a bit too into character. Kanata's team gets the upper hand when Noël brings out a Gatling gun, taking down Filicia in the process. However, they soon run out of ammo and Noël and Yumina get knocked out. Kanata eventually stumbles upon the secret distillery and comes up against Rio and defeats her. After recovering from the battle, Kanata promises to keep the distillery a secret, before spending the night with everyone getting drunk. Kureha, being the only one who could not get drunk, is left to recall the horrors the others subjected her to.
8	"Phone Duty: I Declare an Emergency" "Denwaban: Kinkyū Jitai o Sengen Su" (電話番・緊急事態ヲ宣言ス)	February 22, 2010
The squad is asked to watch over the emergency phone and wait for a call to check if it is still in order, so Kanata decides to take responsibility while the others go out for various tasks. Before Rio leaves, she gives Kanata a trumpet book, signed by an Iliya Arkadia. Later, Seiya, Mishio and the priest arrive, and decide to help Kanata practice using a phone, but a mess is made when Mishio spooks the owl Shuko. Yumina arrives at that point, scolds the others and gives Kanata a change of clothes. Afterward, Kanata needs to go to the bathroom but cannot leave her post, so she holds out until Rio comes back. The phone then rings and Rio answers, hearing a voice she is not too fond of asking her to save Helvetia.
9	"Passing of the Typhoon: False and Real Images" "Taifū Ikka: Kyozō to Jitsuzō" (台風一過・虚像ト実像)	March 1, 2010
Kanata and the others wonder if something is strange about Rio's behavior. As a typhoon settles in, Claus arrives with a package for Rio. After the others tell Kanata about Princess Iliya, they hear from Yumina that Seiya has gone missing and go into the city to search for him. Kureha and Claus find Mishio, who leads them to Seiya, who was trying to protect some eggplants. While they manage to get Seiya to safety, Kureha and Claus are blocked off by a rockfall. It is revealed that Claus is not actually the infamous Desert Wolf that Kureha believed him to be. As the others use the tank to send a wire over, the ground collapses beneath them, but Claus manages to rescue Kureha before she falls in. Despite finding out he is not the Desert Wolf, Kureha still recognizes Claus as the person she admires.
10	"Departure: Time of First Snow" "Tabidachi: Hatsuyuki no Koro" (旅立チ・初雪ノ頃)	March 8, 2010
Kureha tells Kanata more about Princess Iliya, mentioning that she had originally planned to marry the Roman Emperor in order to improve relations with the Roman Empire. Yumina asks Kanata and Rio to check up on an old woman named Jacott who lives in the mountains. The two later take a walk where Rio talks to Kanata about her half-sister. As the snow falls, Jacott, filled with memories about her love, runs off into the snow and never returns. Rio, revealing that she is the half-sister of Iliya, decides to leave the fortress to help improve relations between the warring sides in her place, and leaving Kanata her trumpet.
11	"A Visitor: A Burning Field of Snow" "Raihōsha: Moyuru Setsugen" (来訪者・燃ユル雪原)	March 15, 2010
Kanata and Kureha find an unconscious Roman soldier while on patrol in the snow and return with her to the fortress where they treat her frostbite. The next day, the soldier awakens but does not understand Helvetian, and the others only grasp her name as Aisha. Later, Naomi and Yumina arrive, informing them that Helvetian armies are heading towards the fortress. Yumina acts as a translator for Aisha, who says she came to see the 'angel fossil' (which Kanata saw when she first arrived in Seize). The Ninth Independent Mobile Division led by Colonel Hopkins (the infamous "Demon of Vingt"), whom Noël knows and is terrified of, arrive at the fortress. Filicia chooses to hide Noël and Aisha from Hopkins' contingent, who takes over the fortress. However, their position is given away when Aisha recognizes Noël as the "Witch of Helvetia", and mentions the "Invisible Reaper", causing Noël to scream and run from the room. At the same time, the fortress gets a call that a massive Roman army contingent has been spotted in No Man's Land advancing towards the border of Helvetia at Seize.
12	"Resound Into the Azure Sky" "Sōkyū ni Hibike" (蒼穹ニ響ケ)	March 22, 2010
Aisha is injured by crossfire, but Filicia takes Col. Hopkins hostage before he can take Aisha prisoner and they barricade themselves inside the fortress. Hopkins intended to use Aisha to instigate war and to reuse the biological weapon Noël helped to revive in the process. The girls were good at stalling Hopkins' contingent, but he eventually escapes to rejoin his army and resume operations. Kanata hears a faint cease-fire signal, but Hopkins does not listen. With little options left, and after a few civilians get arrested, the girls use the restored Takemikazuchi and are victorious in a battle against Hopkins and his men. Upon reaching the field between the approaching Roman and Helvetian armies, Kanata sounds a cease-fire signal, but is ignored. She then plays Amazing Grace, which temporarily stalls both forces. Before hostilities are about to resume as the song ends, Rio arrives, accompanied by the Helvetian Royal Guard. Rio, now fiancée of the Roman Emperor, orders both sides to stop while bearing an official creed that declares the war has ended, to much celebration. In the peacetime that follows, Rio rejoins the 1121st Platoon as a granted request by the Emperor for ending the war.
13	"Sounds of the Skies: Beyond the Dream" "Sora no Oto: Yume no Kanata" (空の音・夢ノ彼方)	September 22, 2010 (OVA)
When asked by Mishio what her dream is, Kanata is unsure how to answer. Kanata is given a letter sent to Rio from the Roman Emperor, and goes to find Rio so she can sign it. Whilst in town, she runs into Yumina and learns why Mishio asked her. Kanata later learns from Naomi and Maria that Rio might have wandered off somewhere. Kanata later finds Rio at some ruins, who was wondering about the true story behind the Maidens of Fire that Aisha had told them. Rio then explains that outside of Seize, there are a lot of wars going on. Later that night, Rio takes Kanata on a hot air balloon ride, where she tells her her dream of rebuilding the airplane. The next day, as Kanata is picked to play the role of a fire maiden, Kanata decides her dream is to follow Rio on her dream.

=== Visual novel ===
A musical visual novel based on the anime titled Sound of the Sky: Maiden Quintet (ソ・ラ・ノ・ヲ・ト 乙女ノ五重奏, So Ra No Wo To Otome no Kuintetto) developed by Compile Heart for the PlayStation Portable was released in limited and regular editions on May 27, 2010. It introduces an original character, Kyrie Kuon (九音 綺莉重, Kuon Kirie) (voiced by Marina Inoue).
