= Elfen Lied =

Japanese manga series by Lynn Okamoto

- First tankōbon volume cover, featuring Nyu

エルフェンリート (Erufen Rīto)
- Genre: Dark fantasy; Science fiction
- Manga
- Written by: Lynn Okamoto
- Published by: Shueisha
- English publisher: NA: Dark Horse Comics
- Imprint: Young Jump Comics
- Magazine: Weekly Young Jump
- Original run: June 6, 2002 – August 25, 2005
- Volumes: 12
- Anime television series
- Directed by: Mamoru Kanbe
- Produced by: Kazuaki Morijiri; Manabu Tamura; Osamu Koshinaka
- Written by: Takao Yoshioka
- Music by: Kayō Konishi; Yukio Kondō
- Studio: Arms
- Licensed by: AUS: Madman Entertainment; NA: Sentai Filmworks; UK: 101 Films (expired); Anime Limited
- Original network: AT-X
- English network: NA: Anime Network; UK: Propeller TV; ZA: Animax
- Original run: July 25, 2004 – October 17, 2004
- Episodes: 13 + OVA
- icon

Elfen Lied (Japanese: エルフェンリート, Hepburn: Erufen Rīto) is a Japanese manga series written and illustrated by Lynn Okamoto. It was serialized in Shueisha's seinen manga magazine Weekly Young Jump from June 2002 to August 2005, with its 107 chapters collected into twelve tankōbon volumes. Elfen Lied revolves around the interactions, views, emotions, and differences between human beings and the Diclonii, a mutant species similar to humans in build but distinguishable by two horns on their heads and "vectors", transparent telekinetically controlled arms that have the power to manipulate and cut objects within their reach. The series is centered on the teenage Diclonius girl "Lucy" who was rejected by human beings and subsequently wants revenge.

The series takes its name from the poem "Elfenlied", German for "song of the fairies", which is featured in the story. Elfen Lied involves themes of discrimination, social alienation, identity, prejudice, revenge, abuse, jealousy, regret, and the value of humanity. It is also noted for the graphic violence, emotional themes of how the characters change through, and the overall transgressive subject matter of the whole story.

A 13-episode anime television series adaptation was produced by the studio Arms and broadcast on AT-X from July to October 2004. The anime finished airing before the manga was complete; as a result, the plot differed between the two, especially the ending. The manga is licensed in North America by Dark Horse Comics. The anime series has been licensed in North America by ADV Films and in Australia by Madman Entertainment.

== Plot and characters ==
Elfen Lied takes place in Kamakura and Kanagawa, and focuses on the "Diclonius", a newly mutated species. Their appearance is similar to humans, but with several differences, namely horn-like protrusions on the forehead, the presence of telekinetic invisible arms called "vectors" and unconventional hair colour. One such Diclonius, Lucy, is the main character of the series: Initially held in a facility built for experimentation, located off the coast of Kamakura, she manages to escape and wreak havoc, but is injured in the process, an event which causes her to develop a secondary, childlike personality known as Nyu.

Lucy is found by two locals, Kouta and his cousin Yuka, who study at the local university. They take her in and become involved with the numerous, often brutal, attempts to recapture her by a Special Assault Team and a number of other Diclonius, who shift frequently from oblivious to murderous.

=== Diclonius ===
Much of the plot of Elfen Lied revolves around the Diclonii species, which strongly resemble humans; the only obvious difference is the two horn-like protrusions extending from the temporal bone and parietal bone regions of the skull.

Diclonii powers involve the use of invisible arms, known as "vectors", that can grasp and impact things as if they are solid, but also become insubstantial and pass through objects. They can slice objects as well, which is how Diclonii usually kill their victims. Vectors usually have a limited range of a two meters, but the length varies among each Diclonius. Diclonii also demonstrate the ability to sense one another.

A key point of debate throughout the series is the Diclonius propensity towards violence. Many have a vendetta against humans, and have ambitions to wipe out the human race and populate the world with their own species. It is disputed and contradicted during the series as to how Diclonii develop their violent behavior, whether it is part of their genetic code or whether it stems from abuse by humans.

If a Diclonius vector penetrates or even so much as touches a human male body, the "vector virus" is transferred to the human, causing their children to be born as Diclonii (when born from infected humans, they are called "Silpelits"). An incident involving the escape of a child Diclonius during Kurama's early years, where the Diclonius' vectors penetrated him without causing him pain, resulted in Mariko being born a Diclonius and Kurama taking precautions against a recurrence by urging Bando to be sterilized. All Silpelits are sterile, female and age rapidly. There's only one Diclonius that is actually capable of reproducing: Lucy, the "queen".

== Production ==
=== Anime ===
When Elfen Lied was being adapted into an anime series, director Mamoru Kanbe was recommended to work on the series by the series composer, Takao Yoshioka. Yoshioka believed that Kanbe's general drawing style and composition would be ideal to adapt the manga, still in publication at the time, into an anime series. Kanbe himself, originally reluctant about joining the production, gained interest in it upon reading the manga.

While the manga was still ongoing at the time, Kanbe and the production team were forced to condense the plot of the series into thirteen episodes, even though they felt it was necessary to make more as several significant plot details in the manga which Kanbe felt he could have used to make the series more emotive were left out.

According to Kanbe, he considered Elfen Lied as a "love story," and he wanted to "bring viewers to tears." Thus, he made attempts throughout the series to provide a contrast of emotions, commenting that he could make the violence exemplify this throughout the series. The production team were originally surprised by Okamoto's choice of Kamakura as a setting for the series; however, after several visits to the area, Kanbe commented that the setting in Kamakura was, according to the production team, ideal for the poignant and reflective drama in the series to unfold, as its general tranquility and geography made for a reflective and yet eerie, deep-meaning backdrop to the series. This can be seen in several examples, such as on top of a set of steps overlooking the coastline, where many of the interactions between characters take place. This is used as an important device in conveying the ideas of memory and emotional association, such as the contrast between Kohta and Lucy's conversation when they were ten years old in comparison with their conversation in the final episode.

==== Style and themes ====
A segment from Lucy's escape scene in the first episode of the anime, which is infamous for featuring nudity, graphic violence and transgressive themes. Here, Lucy is using the beheaded body of a secretary she killed as a shield.

In comments made by director Mamoru Kanbe on the Elfen Lied website, he stated that he intended for the anime to question and discuss values relating to the way in which humans divide each other by difference, as well as the belief that atrocities such as those committed by Lucy in the series are strongly influenced by the way in which people are treated by their fellow beings. The series frequently discusses the events and treatment which define the human character in such a way, and the problems which arise from discrimination, as well as the wild contrasts between compassion and vengeance between fellow humans, through the strong vengeance of Lucy compared with her past memory of Kohta. Many of the themes are mentioned in the teasers at the ends of episodes.

Themes such as genocide and the attempts to "purify" the earth from each other also appear in the anime. Both Diclonius and the human species feel the need to populate the earth with their own and wipe the other out. Kanbe quoted this in relation to the desire of humans to cast each other out and segregate one another.

Throughout the series, there is a great deal of blood and gore, graphic violence as well as psychological violence. One of the most prevalent motifs of the series is the humanity of the Diclonius, especially contrasted against the inhumanity of ordinary people. One reviewer described the series as "devoted to quite a few of the darker, more callous factors of human nature." Throughout the series, there are various incidences of casual beatings, cruel experimentation, and outright killing. Also, animal cruelty is present when three young boys mercilessly beat Lucy's puppy until it dies; though the act is off-screen, a copious amount of blood is shown; which drives Lucy to murder the bullies out of revenge and insanity.

The introduction scenes of the Elfen Lied anime are a reference to Gustav Klimt's artwork such as his Stoclet Frieze paintings.

Most of the episodes contain graphic violence, including instances of torture and at one point the series addresses the consequences of the rape of a child. The series also includes scenes that present female nudity and strong language (specifically in the English dub). The series juxtaposes many different tones and genres and was described by Bamboo Dong of Anime News Network as "mixing insane amounts of violence with a heavy dose of ultracuteness." The series balances its darker themes with romantic sub-plots as well as many comic moments. Elfen Lied has been described as similar to, or borrowing elements from Chobits, 3×3 Eyes and Gunslinger Girl.

==== Cultural references ====
The opening and ending sequences feature artistic drawings of the principal characters. These characters are drawn in a style based on Gustav Klimt's paintings, including The Kiss, Adele Bloch-Bauer I, and others with similar imitating poses, colors, and patterns. In promotional art as well as in the series itself, characters make use of a famous El Greco hand symbol of outstretched fingers with the middle and ring fingers connected. The song Elfenlied ("Elf Song") appears in the manga and is credited to the composer Hugo Wolf. A poem by Eduard Mörike is the basis for Wolf's version. It is taught to Nyu by the manga-only protagonist Nozomi. In the manga, the Diclonius are kept in a grotto called the Lebensborn Cave, a reference to the Nazi eugenics program.

== Media ==
=== Manga ===
Written and illustrated by Lynn Okamoto, Elfen Lied was serialized in Shueisha's seinen manga magazine Weekly Young Jump from June 6, 2002, to August 25, 2005. (Note: It was serialized in the magazine from the 27th issue of 2002 to the 39th issue of 2005, released on June 6, 2002, and August 25, 2005, respectively.) Shueisha collected its 107 chapters in twelve tankōbon volumes, released from October 18, 2002, to November 18, 2005.

In North America, the manga was licensed for English release by Dark Horse Comics. They released it in a four-volume omnibus edition from May 22, 2019, to September 9, 2020.

=== Anime ===
A 13-episode anime television series adaptation was directed by Mamoru Kanbe, animated by Arms and produced by Genco and VAP. Author Lynn Okamoto has a brief cameo appearance in episode 12. Elfen Lied first aired on TV Tokyo's AT-X satellite channel from July 25 to October 17, 2004, and was broadcast again in 2005. A single twenty-four-minute original video animation (OVA) episode was released by VAP on April 21, 2005. It takes place somewhere within the timespan of the series' eleventh episode.

The anime's opening theme song is "Lilium", performed by opera singer Kumiko Noma, sung in Latin, with lyrics extracted from biblical passages and Christian sources, including the Book of Psalms, the Epistle of James, the Kyrie prayer, and the hymn "Ave mundi spes Maria". The ending theme song is "Be Your Girl" by Chieko Kawabe.

Home media and distribution

The series was released on Blu-ray in Japan on December 19, 2012.

The anime was licensed by ADV Films in the United States in 2004 and released on DVD in 2005. ADV said the series was one of their bestselling and "most notorious" releases of 2005. During the Anime Boston 2006 convention, ADV announced the distribution rights of the OVA in the United States. However, the OVA was never released on television and was not included with the box set released by ADV Films in November 2006 or in the "Complete Collection" DVDs released in June 2009 and December 2011. When ADV divided their assets, Elfen Lied remained with them and in-print. A Blu-ray box set (as well as a new DVD set) was released on September 3, 2013, by ADV and Section23 Films, making it the only Blu-ray release under the ADV brand, and contains the previously released OVA. In Australia, the series was licensed by Madman Entertainment.

The series aired in the United Kingdom on Propeller TV (Sky) as part of Anime Network's short-lived launch in the United Kingdom. The series also aired uncut despite a stricter censorship standard imposed by OFCOM on UK cable TV. The Anime Network is streaming the series On Demand in English, German and French. The ADV DVD box set confirms a rating of TV-MA-SV; the Canadian rating is 14A.

In a post to the now defunct official Adult Swim message board in April 2006, programming director Kim Manning revealed that despite the series' high level of controversial content, the network inquired into the possibility of airing, as Manning was an avid fan herself and watched the entire series in one sitting. However, the channel's Broadcast Standards and Practices department would have required the series to be so extensively edited ("it would have been cut to shreds", she described in the post) in order to air that it would have been "unintelligible". Ultimately, Adult Swim decided not to air it to preserve and respect the series' original quality.

== Reception ==
Reviewing the first English omnibus volume of Elfen Lied, Anime UK News gave it an 8 out of 10 rating and noted that it is much more detailed than the anime adaptation by explaining what Diclonius are and showing more of the characters' inner thoughts. Although, they stated that the beginning of the anime had "more punch." Anime UK News criticized Okamoto's art as poor throughout the book, but enjoyed the extra unrelated stories included at the end. Comic Buzz gave a 9/10 score, calling it a "great read from start to finish". They felt the art style changed with the characters' emotions and said it reminded them variously of Neon Genesis Evangelion and the work of Junji Ito. Rai of TheOASG gave the omnibus a 3 out of 5 star rating, criticizing the art and fan service, and overall preferred the anime which she acknowledged having bias for.

Reception for the anime was generally mixed to positive. Reviewers such as Tasha Robinson of Sci Fi Weekly and Theron Martin of Anime News Network praised Elfen Lied for its story and technical excellence in production quality, animation and color. Due to the many scenes of nudity and gore, Dominic Laeno of THEM Anime Reviews criticized the series as being "overly blatant." Martin criticized the anime for having "sub-par voice acting" in both the original Japanese audio track and the English dub, although he gave an "A−" rating for both language dubs. Martin also said that the series "ends abruptly with some loose ends to the story that could leave viewers unsatisfied," but also called it "a horror series of exceptional merit." Laeno called the series "a genuinely good watch." Stig Høgset, also of THEM Anime Reviews, called Elfen Lied "a very special show, good and bad parts taken into consideration."

On June 12, 2015, the now-defunct Chinese Ministry of Culture listed Elfen Lied among 38 anime and manga titles banned in China.

== Legacy ==
Matt and Ross Duffer have cited Elfen Lied as an influence on their 2016 Netflix series Stranger Things. They said that Elfen Lied was like an "ultraviolent E.T." and noted that the character Eleven was inspired by the anime.

The anime opening theme "Lilium", with its Latin lyrics extracted from biblical sources, has been publicly performed by a variety of choirs around the world, including in countries such as Ukraine, Sweden, Brazil, and Chile.
