= Mamoru Kanbe =

Japanese storyboard artist and director (born 1962)

Mamoru Kanbe (神戸守, Kanbe Mamoru; born 1962) is a Japanese storyboard artist and director. He is best known for directing the anime series Elfen Lied, Sound of the Sky, Kimi to Boku and The Promised Neverland.

== Filmography ==
- Nausicaä of the Valley of Wind (1984), Production Manager
- Ninja Ryukenden (1991), Director
- Nana Toshi Monogatari (1994), Director
- Psycho Diver: Soul Siren (1995), Director, Storyboard
- Harimogu Harley (1996), Director
- Cardcaptor Sakura (1998-2000), Storyboard (eps. 5, 9, 12, 16, 19, 21, 25, 28, 30, 33, 37, 41, 44), Episode Director (eps. 5, 9, 12, 16, 19, 21, 25, 28, 30, 33, 37, 41, 44, 48)
- NieA_7 (2000), Storyboard (eps. 8, 12), Episode Director (eps. 3, 8)
- Princess Comet (2001-2002), Director
- Machine Robo Rescue (2003-2004), Director, Storyboard (eps. 1–2, 8, 51), Episode Director (eps. 1, 51)
- Elfen Lied (2004), Director, Storyboard (OP; eps. 1, 13), Episode Director (eps. 1, 13)
- Panda-Z (2004), Director
- I"s Pure (2005), Director, Storyboard (OP; ep. 1)
- Demon Prince Enma (2006-2007), Director
- Baccano! (2007), Storyboard (eps. 6–7, 11, 15), Episode Director (eps. 6, 11, 15)
- Tegami Bachi: Hikari to Ao no Gensou Yawa (2008), Director
- Denpa teki na Kanojo (2009), Director, Storyboard
- Sound of the Sky (2010), Director, Storyboard (OP; eps. 1–2, 12–13), Episode Director (OP; eps. 1, 12–13)
- Kimi to Boku (2011–2012), Director
- Hanayamata (2014), Storyboard (eps. 1–2)
- Subete ga F ni Naru (2015), Director, Storyboard (eps. 1–2, 7, 11), Episode Director (ep. 11)
- A Place Further than the Universe (2018), Storyboard (eps. 4, 7–8)
- The Promised Neverland (2019–2021), Director
- Ninjala (2022), Director (eps. 1–63)
- Shoshimin: How to Become Ordinary (2024–2025), Director
- The Case Files of Biblia Bookstore (2027), Director
