= Elfenlied =

Poem

"Elfenlied" (German pronunciation: [ˈɛlfənˌliːt], "fairy song") is the conventional title of a 1780 poem by Goethe, and of a later (c. 1830) poem by Eduard Mörike (and of their various respective adaptations to music).

Goethe's poem was written in 1780, in a letter sent to Charlotte von Stein, without a title, but introduced by Die Elfen sangen "the elves/fairies sang"; the title "Elfenlied" (and variants) were only set in editions of Goethe's collected poems (titled "A Midnight Fairy Song" by Thomas 1859). Goethe's poem is Romantic, invoking the image of a fairy-dance under the impression of a moonlit night. It was set to music many times, e.g. as "Elfenliedchen" by Julius Kniese (1900), as "Elfensang" by Erich J. Wolff (1907) and as "Elfenlied" by Alexander Zemlinsky (1934).

Mörike's poem was written at some point between 1826 and early 1828 (first published in 1832). It is humorous, its premise being a pun on Elf (or Elfe), the German word both for "elf" or "fairy" and "eleven": It describes an Elfe (a fairy) awakened one hour early for the fairy-dance, at eleven o'clock instead of at midnight, due to mistaking the watchman's calling out of the eleventh hour for the calling of the "Elves" to the fairy-dance. Still half-asleep, the Elf mistakes glow-worms sitting on a stone wall for the lit halls of the fairy-hall and, trying to look in, bashes his head against the stone. The poem was set to music by Hugo Wolf in 1888 (the German title of this work is also rendered "Elfin dream" or "The elfin's dream" in English-language music catalogues).

Hugo Wolf also composed a separate choral piece called "Elfenlied", in this case an adaptation from words in Shakespeare's A Midsummer Night's Dream (the "fairy song" from act 2, scene 5, "Bunte Schlangen, zweigezüngt"/ "You spotted Snakes with double tongue").

== Text ==
=== Goethe ===
English translation by W.G. Thomas (1859)

Um Mitternacht, wenn die Menschen erst schlafen,
Dann scheinet uns der Mond,
Dann leuchtet uns der Stern;
Wir wandeln und singen
Und tanzen erst gern.

Um Mitternacht, wenn die Menschen erst schlafen,
Auf Wiesen, an den Erlen
Wir suchen unsern Raum
Und wandeln und singen
Und tanzen einen Traum.

Translation:

At midnight, when asleep are men at length,
Then shines for us the moon,
Then gleams for us the star,
We rove and dance and sing
Nor gay till then we are.

At midnight, when asleep are men at length,
We seek the alder grove,
And in the pale moonbeam,
We rove about and sing,
And gaily dance a dream.

=== Mörike ===
Bei Nacht im Dorf der Wächter rief:
Elfe!
Ein ganz kleines Elfchen im Walde schlief,
Wohl um die Elfe;
Und meint, es rief ihm aus dem Thal
Bei seinem Namen die Nachtigall,
Oder Silpelit hätt' ihn gerufen.
Reibt sich der Elf' die Augen aus,
Begibt sich vor sein Schneckenhaus
Und ist als wie ein trunken Mann,
Sein Schläflein war nicht voll gethan,
Und humpelt also tippe tapp
Durch's Haselholz in's Thal hinab,
Schlupft an der Weinbergmauer hin,
Daran viel Feuerwürmchen glühn:
"Was sind das helle Fensterlein?
Da drin wird eine Hochzeit seyn;
Die Kleinen sitzen beim Mahle,
Und treiben's in dem Saale.
Da guck' ich wohl ein wenig 'nein!"
— Pfui, stößt den Kopf an harten Stein!
Elfe, gelt, du hast genug?
Gukuk! Gukuk!

Translation:

At night in the village the watchman shouted
"Elf!"
A tiny little elf was asleep in the wood –
Just around eleven;
And he thinks that from the dale
He was called by his name by the nightingale,
Or that Silpelit might have called him.
So the elf rubs his eyes,
Steps out before his snail-shell house,
And is much like a drunken man,
His sleep not fully completed;
And he hobbles thusly, tippy-tap,
Through the hazel wood down to the dale,
Slips along the vineyard wall,
On which many fireflies are glowing.
"What are those bright windows?
There must be a wedding inside;
The little people are sitting at the feast,
And make merry in the hall.
So I'll just take a peep inside!"
— Fie! he hits his head on hard stone!
Well, elf, had enough, have you?
Cuckoo! Cuckoo!

== In popular culture ==
The poem is the namesake of the anime and manga series Elfen Lied.

== See also ==
- Der Erlkönig
- Elveskud
- Elfen Lied (2002 manga)
