= Propeller TV =

Anglo-Chinese TV channel

- Headquarters: Chiswick Park, 566 Chiswick High Road, London W4 5YA

Ownership
- Owner: Xiking Group

History
- Launched: 6 February 2006

Links
- Website: propellertv.co.uk

Propeller TV is an Anglo/Chinese television production company. Until the beginning of April 2019 it provided a TV service broadcast from the SES Astra 2G satellite and was also carried on the SKY EPG at Channel 185. It was also available for several years as an IPTV service from Vision TV at LCN 264 on Freeview HD devices with Internet access.

Propeller TV relaunched in April 2013 with a new weekly schedule and content produced in both the UK and China. Propeller TV was launched on the state-owned CIBN platform (China International Broadcasting Network) in China.

== History ==
Propeller TV Ltd. was formerly known as The Image Channel Company Limited. The company was founded in 1993 and is based in London, United Kingdom. The channel launched on 6 February 2006 on British Sky Broadcasting's satellite platform, Sky.

It changed its name in March, 2006. As of June 2009, Propeller TV Ltd. operates as a subsidiary of Xiking Group. The channel was created with UK government investment and began broadcasting in 2005. In 2009 Propeller TV was bought by the Xiking Group, Beijing.

== China-UK Film and TV Conference ==
Propeller TV and Xiking Media and Culture organised the China UK Film and TV Conference on 20 September 2015 in London.

The conference promoted strong partnerships between China and the UK in the realms of entertainment, such as television and cinema. It was attended by some very famous people from various fields, including Chinese Vice Premier, Liu Yandong and UK Minister of Culture, Media and Sport, Ed Vaizey, who both opened the show season together.

The conference held various seminars, from co-production to financing, and was attended by various professionals working in the related sectors, who were looking towards partnerships in China for the future of the industry.

== China-UK Media Roundtable ==
Hosted by the State Council Information Office of the People's Republic of China, UK Trade and Investment, and organized by Propeller TV, the China-UK Media Roundtable was held in London on 23 November 2015.

Representatives from government organizations of both nations, principles from the media industry, and other specialists created a heated discussion over issues such as media industry development, media convergence and development between new media and traditional media, and cooperation.

Jing Junhai, the deputy head of the Propaganda Department of the Chinese Communist Party, attended the opening ceremony, along with Bi Xiaopu, Sue Bishop, Director of Creative Economy, Tech and Construction at UKTI, and Ye Zhenzhen, executive director of Propeller TV. They addressed their expectation that this conference would new opportunities for China-UK media and promote pragmatic cooperation.
