= List of Strike the Blood episodes =

Strike the Blood is an anime series adapted from the light novel series of the same title written by Gakuto Mikumo with illustrations by Manyako. Produced by Silver Link and Connect, the series is directed by Hideyo Yamamoto with scripts by Hiroyuki Yoshino and character design by Keiichi Sano. The series aired from October 4, 2013, to March 28, 2014, on AT-X. Crunchyroll (with distribution by Discotek Media) released the anime series in a combined Blu-ray/DVD format on November 8, 2016.

On March 15, 2015, publisher Dengeki Bunko announced that a two-part OVA based on an original story by creator Gakuto Mikumo would be released by year's end. On August 14, 2015, further details were announced for Strike the Blood: Valkyria's Kingdom which would be released on DVD/BRD on November 25 and December 23 of that year.

A second 4 volume, 8 episode OVA series based on the 9th light novel, co-produced by Silver Link and Connect and with returning director Hideyo Yamamoto, was released between November 21, 2016, and May 24, 2017.

A third 10 episode OVA series, produced by Connect and with returning director Hideyo Yamamoto, debuted on December 19, 2018, and concluded on September 29, 2019.

Another OVA titled Strike the Blood: Kieta Seisō-hen was released on January 29, 2020. A fourth OVA series, projected at 12 episodes, debuted on April 8, 2020, and concluded on June 30, 2021. The staff from the third OVA series returned to reprise their roles.

After the conclusion of Strike the Blood IV, a fifth and final OVA series titled Strike the Blood Final was released from March 30 to July 29, 2022.

== Series overview ==
Season	Episodes	Originally released	
Season	Episodes	First released	Last released
1	24	October 4, 2013	March 28, 2014
2	8	November 23, 2016	May 24, 2017
3	10	December 18, 2018	September 29, 2019
4	12	April 8, 2020	June 30, 2021
5	4	March 30, 2022	July 29, 2022

== Episode list ==
=== Strike the Blood (2013–14) ===
No.	Title	Original release date
1	"The Right Arm of the Saint I"; Transliteration: "Seija no Migiude Hen Ichi" (Japanese: 聖者の右腕篇I)	October 4, 2013
2	"The Right Arm of the Saint II"; Transliteration: "Seija no Migiude Hen Ni" (Japanese: 聖者の右腕篇II)	October 11, 2013
3	"The Right Arm of the Saint III"; Transliteration: "Seija no Migiude Hen San" (Japanese: 聖者の右腕篇III)	October 18, 2013
4	"The Right Arm of the Saint IV"; Transliteration: "Seija no Migiude Hen Yon" (Japanese: 聖者の右腕篇IV)	October 25, 2013
5	"From the Warlord's Empire I"; Transliteration: "Sen'ō no Shisha Hen Ichi" (Japanese: 戦王の使者篇I)	November 1, 2013
6	"From the Warlord's Empire II"; Transliteration: "Sen'ō no Shisha Hen Ni" (Japanese: 戦王の使者篇II)	November 8, 2013
7	"From the Warlord's Empire III"; Transliteration: "Sen'ō no Shisha Hen San" (Japanese: 戦王の使者篇III)	November 15, 2013
8	"From the Warlord's Empire IV"; Transliteration: "Sen'ō no Shisha Hen Yon" (Japanese: 戦王の使者篇IV)	November 22, 2013
9	"The Amphisbaena I"; Transliteration: "Tenshi Enjō Hen Ichi" (Japanese: 天使炎上篇I)	November 29, 2013
10	"The Amphisbaena II"; Transliteration: "Tenshi Enjō Hen Ni" (Japanese: 天使炎上篇II)	December 6, 2013
11	"The Amphisbaena III"; Transliteration: "Tenshi Enjō Hen San" (Japanese: 天使炎上篇III)	December 13, 2013
12	"The Amphisbaena IV"; Transliteration: "Tenshi Enjō Hen Yon" (Japanese: 天使炎上篇IV)	December 20, 2013
13	"Labyrinth of the Blue Witch I"; Transliteration: "Aoki Majo no Meikyū Hen Ichi" (Japanese: 蒼き魔女の迷宮篇I)	January 10, 2014
14	"Labyrinth of the Blue Witch II"; Transliteration: "Aoki Majo no Meikyū Hen Ni" (Japanese: 蒼き魔女の迷宮篇II)	January 17, 2014
15	"Labyrinth of the Blue Witch III"; Transliteration: "Aoki Majo no Meikyū Hen San" (Japanese: 蒼き魔女の迷宮篇III)	January 24, 2014
16	"Fiesta for the Observers I"; Transliteration: "Kansokusha-tachi no Utage Hen Ichi" (Japanese: 観測者たちの宴篇I)	January 31, 2014
17	"Fiesta for the Observers II"; Transliteration: "Kansokusha-tachi no Utage Hen Ni" (Japanese: 観測者たちの宴篇II)	February 7, 2014
18	"Fiesta for the Observers III"; Transliteration: "Kansokusha-tachi no Utage Hen San" (Japanese: 観測者たちの宴篇III)	February 14, 2014
19	"Fiesta for the Observers IV"; Transliteration: "Kansokusha-tachi no Utage Hen Yon" (Japanese: 観測者たちの宴篇IV)	February 21, 2014
20	"Return of the Alchemist I"; Transliteration: "Renkinjutsushi no Kikan Hen Ichi" (Japanese: 錬金術師の帰還篇I)	February 28, 2014
21	"Return of the Alchemist II"; Transliteration: "Renkinjutsushi no Kikan Hen Ni" (Japanese: 錬金術師の帰還篇II)	March 7, 2014
22	"Return of the Alchemist III"; Transliteration: "Renkinjutsushi no Kikan Hen San" (Japanese: 錬金術師の帰還篇III)	March 14, 2014
23	"Empire of the Dawn I"; Transliteration: "Akatsuki no Teikoku Hen Ichi" (Japanese: 暁の帝国篇I)	March 21, 2014
24	"Empire of the Dawn II"; Transliteration: "Akatsuki no Teikoku Hen Ni" (Japanese: 暁の帝国篇II)	March 28, 2014
OVA–1	"Kingdom of the Valkyria I"; Transliteration: "Varukyuria no Ōkoku Zenpen" (Japanese: ヴァルキュリアの王国 前篇)	November 25, 2015
OVA–2	"Kingdom of the Valkyria II"; Transliteration: "Varukyuria no Ōkoku Kouhen" (Japanese: ヴァルキュリアの王国 後篇)	December 23, 2015

=== Strike the Blood II (2016–17) ===
No.	Title	Original release date
OVA 1 (25)	"Swords-Shaman of Shadow I"; Transliteration: "Kuro no Ken'nagi-hen I" (Japanese: 黒の剣巫篇I)	November 23, 2016
OVA 2 (26)	"Swords-Shaman of Shadow II"; Transliteration: "Kuro no Ken'nagi-hen II" (Japanese: 黒の剣巫篇II)	November 23, 2016
OVA 3 (27)	"Swords-Shaman of Shadow III"; Transliteration: "Kuro no Ken'nagi-hen III" (Japanese: 黒の剣巫篇III)	December 23, 2016
OVA 4 (28)	"The 4th Primogenitor on the run I"; Transliteration: "Tōbō no Dai yon Shinso-hen I" (Japanese: 逃亡の第四真祖篇I)	December 23, 2016
OVA 5 (29)	"The 4th Primogenitor on the run II"; Transliteration: "Tōbō no Dai yon Shinso-hen II" (Japanese: 逃亡の第四真祖篇II)	March 29, 2017
OVA 6 (30)	"Knight of the Sinful God I"; Transliteration: "Kyūshin no Kishi-hen I" (Japanese: 咎神の騎士篇I)	March 29, 2017
OVA 7 (31)	"Knight of the Sinful God II"; Transliteration: "Kyūshin no Kishi-hen II" (Japanese: 咎神の騎士篇II)	May 24, 2017
OVA 8 (32)	"Knight of the Sinful God III"; Transliteration: "Kyūshin no Kishi-hen III" (Japanese: 咎神の騎士篇III)	May 24, 2017

=== Strike the Blood III (2018–19) ===
No.	Title	Original release date
OVA 1 (33)	"Tartaros-Roses I"; Transliteration: "Tarutarosu no bara I" (Japanese: タルタロスの薔薇篇I)	December 19, 2018
OVA 2 (34)	"Tartaros-Roses II"; Transliteration: "Tarutarosu no bara II" (Japanese: タルタロスの薔薇篇II)	December 19, 2018
OVA 3 (35)	"Tartaros-Roses III"; Transliteration: "Tarutarosu no bara III" (Japanese: タルタロスの薔薇篇III)	March 27, 2019
OVA 4 (36)	"The Time of My Life I"; Transliteration: "Ōgon no hibi I" (Japanese: 黄金の日々篇I)	March 27, 2019
OVA 5 (37)	"The Time of My Life II"; Transliteration: "Ōgon no hibi II" (Japanese: 黄金の日々篇II)	May 29, 2019
OVA 6 (38)	"The Time of My Life III"; Transliteration: "Ogon no hibi III" (Japanese: 黄金の日々篇III)	May 29, 2019
OVA 7 (39)	"The War of Original Vampires I"; Transliteration: "Sinso taisen I" (Japanese: 真祖大戦I)	July 24, 2019
OVA 8 (40)	"The War of Original Vampires II"; Transliteration: "Sinso taisen II" (Japanese: 真祖大戦II)	July 24, 2019
OVA 9 (41)	"The War of Original Vampires III"; Transliteration: "Sinso taisen III" (Japanese: 真祖大戦III)	September 25, 2019
OVA 10 (42)	"The War of Original Vampires IV"; Transliteration: "Sinso taisen IV" (Japanese: 真祖大戦IV)	September 25, 2019

=== Strike the Blood IV (2020–21) ===
No.	Title	Original release date
OVA 1 (43)	"Paladiness of Mirage I"; Transliteration: "Kagerō no hijiri kishi-hen I" (Japanese: 陽炎の聖騎士篇I)	April 8, 2020
OVA 2 (44)	"Paladiness of Mirage II"; Transliteration: "Kagerō no hijiri kishi-hen II" (Japanese: 陽炎の聖騎士篇II)	April 8, 2020
OVA 3 (45)	"Paladiness of Mirage III"; Transliteration: "Kagerō no hijiri kishi-hen III" (Japanese: 陽炎の聖騎士篇III)	July 29, 2020
OVA 4 (46)	"Tournament in the Nightmare Night I"; Transliteration: "Owaranai yoru no utage-hen I" (Japanese: 終わらない夜の宴篇I)	July 29, 2020
OVA 5 (47)	"Tournament in the Nightmare Night II"; Transliteration: "Owaranai yoru no utage-hen II" (Japanese: 終わらない夜の宴篇II)	September 30, 2020
OVA 6 (48)	"Tournament in the Nightmare Night III"; Transliteration: "Owaranai yoru no utage-hen III" (Japanese: 終わらない夜の宴篇III)	September 30, 2020
OVA 7 (49)	"Reunion of Vampire Princess I"; Transliteration: "Saikai no kyūketsu hime-hen I" (Japanese: 再会の吸血姫篇I)	December 23, 2020
OVA 8 (50)	"Reunion of Vampire Princess II"; Transliteration: "Saikai no kyūketsu hime-hen II" (Japanese: 再会の吸血姫篇II)	December 23, 2020
OVA 9 (51)	"Reunion of Vampire Princess III"; Transliteration: "Saikai no kyūketsu hime-hen III" (Japanese: 再会の吸血姫篇III)	March 24, 2021
OVA 10 (52)	"Seize the Twelve Beast Vassals I"; Transliteration: "Jū ni no kemono to chi no jūsha ta hen I" (Japanese: 十二眷獣と血の従者たち篇I)	March 24, 2021
OVA 11 (53)	"Seize the Twelve Beast Vassals II"; Transliteration: "Jū ni no kemono to chi no jūsha ta hen II" (Japanese: 十二眷獣と血の従者たち篇II)	June 30, 2021
OVA 12 (54)	"Seize the Twelve Beast Vassals III"; Transliteration: "Jū ni no kemono to chi no jūsha ta hen III" (Japanese: 十二眷獣と血の従者たち篇III)	June 30, 2021

=== Strike the Blood Final (2022) ===
No.	Title	Original release date
OVA 1 (55)	"Returning With Glory I"; Transliteration: "Akatsuki no gaisen-hen I" (Japanese: 暁の凱旋篇I)	March 30, 2022
OVA 2 (56)	"Returning With Glory II"; Transliteration: "Akatsuki no gaisen-hen II" (Japanese: 暁の凱旋篇II)	March 30, 2022
OVA 3 (57)	"Returning With Glory III"; Transliteration: "Akatsuki no gaisen-hen III" (Japanese: 暁の凱旋篇III)	July 29, 2022
OVA 4 (58)	"Returning With Glory IV"; Transliteration: "Akatsuki no gaisen-hen IV" (Japanese: 暁の凱旋篇IV)	July 29, 2022
