= Re:bel Robotica =

Japanese mixed-media project

- Cover of the novel

レベルロボチカ (Reberu Robochika)
- Genre: Science fiction
- Created by: Mika Pikazo; Arch
- Serial novel

Episode #β One day.
- Written by: Ryō Yoshigami
- Illustrated by: Mika Pikazo
- Original run: January 3, 2020 – May 25, 2020
- Novel

Re:bel Robotica 0
- Written by: Ryō Yoshigami
- Illustrated by: Mika Pikazo
- Published by: Shinchosha
- Imprint: Shincho Bunko nex
- Published: September 28, 2022
- Novel
- Written by: Gakuto Mikumo
- Illustrated by: Mika Pikazo
- Published by: Shinchosha
- Imprint: Shincho Bunko nex
- Published: September 28, 2022
- Anime television series
- Directed by: Shin Oonuma (chief); Kōki Onoue
- Written by: Ryō Yoshigami
- Music by: Takumi Ozawa; Shiho Terada
- Studio: Silver Link
- Original run: 2027 – scheduled

Re:bel Robotica (Japanese: レベルロボチカ, Hepburn: Reberu Robochika), stylized as RE:BEL ROBOTICA, is a Japanese mixed-media project created by Mika Pikazo and Arch. Originally developed under the title AAO Project, it was originally conceived as a doujinshi work by Pikazo, with it being sold at Summer Comiket on August 11, 2017. The project was officially launched in December 2019, with the launch of its official website and the release of a serialized novel. Two novels written and published by Ryō Yoshigami and Gakuto Mikumo were released by Shinchosha under their Shincho Bunko nex imprint in September 2022. An anime television series produced by Silver Link is set to premiere in 2027.

== Synopsis ==
In the year 2050, technology has allowed the merging of the real and virtual worlds, leading to the development of the concept of Meta Reality or MR. People now have the ability to use their senses to interact with the virtual world. Taiki, a high school student, has underdeveloped senses, preventing him from reaching the full potential of MR. During an attacked, he is saved by an MR being named Lily. The two decide to partner up in defeating Kiramon, MR monsters who were previously human.

== Characters ==
Taiki (タイキ)
A 15-year-old high school student with underdeveloped MR senses, a condition called MR bug. After being saved by Lily, he realizes that he can use his condition for good and fighting the Kiramon.
Lily (リリィ, Rirī)
An MR being that saved Taiki from an attack. She is a Robotica, an advanced AI being with no physical body.
Kurumi (くるみ)
Taiki's childhood friend and schoolmate, who has an energetic personality.
Asato (アサト)
Taiki's classmate. He has an antisocial personality and is interested in the Robotica.

== Development ==
Mika Pikazo originally developed the concept for the project during the early days of VTubing, wondering what it would be like for VTubers to be able to interact with people. Because the concept started when VTubing was still new, she was fascinated by VTubers' relationship to virtual reality and augmented reality, wanting to create a world where such concepts could be brought to life. She initially started writing imagining life as a high school student in 2050, along with why Lily exists and how she met Taiki.

Pikazo first published the project as a doujinshi work at Summer Comiket in 2017. This caught the attention of the publishing company Arch, which decided to help develop the property. Ryo Yoshigami, a science-fiction writer, and Gakuto Mikumo, a writer known for the novel series Asura Cryin' and Strike the Blood, joined the project to flesh out the characters and setting, as well as to write novels as part of the project.

== Media ==
=== Novels ===
The project was officially launched on December 30, 2019, with the launch of the project's official website, with a web novel titled Episode #β One day. being serialized on the website from January 3 to May 25, 2020. Two novels, Re:bel Robotica 0 (RE:BEL ROBOTICA 0 -レベルロボチカ 0-) by Ryō Yoshigami, and Re:bel Robotica by Gakuto Mikumo, were released by Shinchosha under their Shincho Bunko nex imprint on September 28, 2022.

=== Anime ===
An anime television series, telling a new original story, was announced on June 24, 2026. The series will be produced by Silver Link and directed by Kōki Onoue, with Shin Oonuma serving as chief director, Ryō Yoshigami handling series composition, Kazuyuki Yamayoshi designing the characters, Yuki Kajiura composing the theme songs and insert songs, and Takumi Ozawa and Shiho Terada composing the music. It is set to premiere in 2027.
