= The Mystic Archives of Dantalian =

Japanese light novel series

- Cover of the first light novel

ダンタリアンの書架 (Dantalian no Shoka)
- Light novel
- Written by: Gakuto Mikumo
- Illustrated by: G-Yuusuke
- Published by: Kadokawa Shoten
- Imprint: Kadokawa Sneaker Bunko
- Magazine: The Sneaker
- Original run: February 29, 2008 – February 28, 2011
- Volumes: 8
- Manga
- Written by: Gakuto Mikumo
- Illustrated by: Chako Abeno
- Published by: Kadokawa Shoten
- Magazine: Shōnen Ace
- Original run: March 26, 2010 – July 26, 2012
- Volumes: 5
- Manga

Dantalian no Shoka Dalian Days
- Written by: Gakuto Mikumo
- Illustrated by: Monaco Sena
- Published by: Kadokawa Shoten
- Magazine: Comp Ace
- Original run: March 26, 2010 – October 26, 2011
- Volumes: 2
- Manga

Dalian-chan no Shoka
- Written by: Gakuto Mikumo
- Illustrated by: Shigeta-ke
- Published by: Kadokawa Shoten
- Magazine: 4-koma nano ace
- Original run: July 7, 2011 – July 9, 2012
- Volumes: 1
- Anime television series
- Directed by: Yutaka Uemura
- Produced by: Junka Kobayashi; Yasuhiro Takeda; Yoshikazu Beniya
- Written by: Kurasumi Sunayama; Tatsuhiko Urahata; Hiroyuki Yamaga
- Music by: Yō Tsuji
- Studio: Gainax
- Licensed by: NA: Funimation
- Original network: TV Tokyo
- Original run: July 16, 2011 – October 1, 2011
- Episodes: 12

The Mystic Archives of Dantalian (ダンタリアンの書架, Dantalian no Shoka; lit. "Bookshelf of Dantalian"; alternate title Bibliotheca Mystica de Dantalian) is a Japanese light novel series written by Gakuto Mikumo and illustrated by G-Yuusuke. The series started serialization in Kadokawa Shoten's light novel magazine The Sneaker on February 29, 2008. A manga adaptation by Chako Abeno started serialization in Kadokawa Shoten's shōnen manga magazine Shōnen Ace on March 26, 2010. Another manga adaptation by Monaco Sena started serialization in Kadokawa Shoten's seinen manga magazine Comp Ace on March 26, 2010. A 12-episode anime adaptation by Gainax aired between July and October, 2011.

== Plot ==
This story takes place in England after World War I. After the death of his grandfather, Hugh Anthony Disward, also known as Huey, receives a mysterious key and according to his grandfather's will, must take custody of the Bibliotheca Mystica de Dantalian in order to inherit his estate and all his possessions. Upon meeting Dalian, a child living at the estate, he learns that she is the guardian of the Archives which contain forbidden knowledge stored in thousands of magic books called "Phantom Books" (幻書, gensho). Upon agreeing to become Dalian's new Keykeeper, Huey joins her into investigating incidents regarding people misusing the power of the Phantom Books, most of them with tragic consequences, and using his power as Keykeeper to seal the power of the Phantom Books and restore order to the area.

== Characters ==
Dalian (ダリアン, Darian)
Voiced by: Miyuki Sawashiro
The Kuro no Yomihime (黒の読姫; literally "black reading princess"), or Black Biblioprincess. She is a beautiful young girl with long black hair tinted purple and large dark pink eyes, and a metal box with a lock at her collar, where a ribbon would normally go. She is the custodian of the Bibliotheca Mystica de Dantalian housing 900,666 Phantom Books. In novel volume 1 chapter 4 Huey is looking for the library his grandfather left him, but can't find in his mansion. She asks him if he has heard of 'Vase World', of Chinese legend. She tells him that it eventually came into the possession of his grandfather. In the last pages of the chapter Huey learns that Dalian is the vase world, and inside her is contained the Bibliotheca Mystica de Dantalian. Because of this, she generally considers herself of great importance and believes herself to be more knowledgeable than most humans, even going so far as to praise others in a presumptuous manner when they exhibit more wisdom than she anticipated. She also has another self. She appears as the mysterious librarian inside the archives of the Bibliotheca Mystica de Dantalian. In the last episode of the anime television series, her "other self" overlaps with the current one in an attempt to save Huey when he almost lost his conscience in the Bibliotheca Mystica de Dantalian. When asked a question that calls for a "Yes" or "No" answer, she will reply appropriately in English rather than Japanese. She is often seen as a judgmental and arbitrary character, which clashes with her unexpected weakness for sweets; whenever presented with something sweet, or the opportunity to eat something sweet, a small lock of her hair will flick out from the rest of her head. She and Huey appear to share a very formal and business-like, but in reality is a really lighthearted and caring, relationship. She is shown to be considerate of others but reluctant to show as much in a tsundere fashion style.
Hugh Anthony Disward (ヒュー・アンソニー・ディスワード, Hyū Ansonī Disuwādo)
Voiced by: Daisuke Ono (Adult), Kana Hanazawa (Young)
Dalian's Keykeeper, also known as Huey. A handsome young man with wavy dark blonde hair and sharp sapphire eyes, he is a former Royal Air Force Pilot and the grandson of the previous Keykeeper Sir Wesley Disward, who left Huey the Bibliotheca Mystica de Dantalian and Dalian in his will. He is often seen as a calm and generally unfazed character who takes everything in stride, as he accepted his new-found responsibilities as the Keeper of the Bibliotheca Mystica de Dantalian without much question or argument. When he retrieves books from Dalian, he appears as a young child inside of the archives, speaking with a girl dressed in white with silver pigtails and purple eyes. A mysterious girl who lives inside the Dantalian Library. The girl's nature is unclear. Her true name is not known, but she is Dalian's "other self."; One thing is clear, though, which is that she and Huey share a keen personal relationship for reasons currently unknown. In the novel volume 2 chapter 9 of the arc "The Pop-Up Book", it is revealed that the girl inside the library of Dantalian was Dalian; She was actually the one that entrusted the key to the young Huey when he got lost inside the archives. In there he promised her that one day he would take her to the outside world. In the last episode of the anime television series, the promise is kept on hold; Also, he still doesn't know that the girl inside the archives is actually Dalian "other self." He sees her as another individual person without knowing who she really is.
Flamberge (フランベルジュ, Furamberuju)
Voiced by: Ami Koshimizu
The Gin no Yomihime (銀の読姫; literally "silver reading princess") or Silver Biblioprincess, otherwise known as the custodian of the Long-Lost Library. She is often called just "Flam" for short. She appears to be a girl in her teenage years, with long silver hair and sharp magenta eyes. She wears a white straitjacket with nine padlocks, although she says that she chose to wear it herself because she thought it "matches Hal's tastes". Flamberge, like Dalian, is a 'vase world', containing a library inside her. In contrast to Huey's technique of retrieving Phantom Books from Dalian, the method used by Hal to retrieve books from Flam in the novel is very similar but requires a bit more unwrapping. When he asks her "Art thou mankind--?" she shakes her hair and laughs madly while he unwraps her, before answering. In the anime the retrieval is shown to be very raw, painful and less dignified. Flamberge is often seen as a very arrogant and unpleasantly blunt character, and enjoys harassing Hal by accusing him of having perverted tendencies or a dirty mind. But she is also described as having read fairy tales to Mabel Nash's younger sister in novel Volume 1 Chapter 5.
Hal Kamhout (ハル・カムホート, Haru Kamuhōto)
Voiced by: Masayuki Katou
Flamberge's Keykeeper. He has sharp blue eyes and long side-swept brown hair. He and Flam do not have a very good relationship, and he will often use the phrase "Keep your mouth shut, you piece of junk" in response to Flam's endless accusations of him being a pervert, making it almost something of a catchphrase for him. In the novel, like Huey, he has a jewel embedded in the back of his right hand. When he uses it he also holds a bunch of golden keys, which he uses to unlock the locks of Flamberge's straitjacket. Rather than reading the Phantom Books he retrieves from the Long-Lost Library, he places them in the Staff of Surtr that he carries, and uses the book as fuel for the fire the staff produces, burning any Phantom Books he comes across along with the memories the current owner had in relation to them. Thus, because of this, he refers himself as a "Libricide Officer". He is often seen as a very serious and highly observant character, and appears to have highly advanced deduction and cognitive abilities.
Raziel (ラジエル, Rajieru)
Voiced by: Sayuri Yahagi
The Aka no Yomihime (赤の読姫; literally "red reading princess") or Red Biblioprincess, otherwise known as the custodian of the Bibliotheca Razielis Archangeli. A girl with the appearance of a small child with short green hair. Her right eye is green [novel] or golden [anime], while her left eye is covered with a metal eyepatch of dark gray lustre, and a big keyhole in it. In the novels she is first seen in Volume 1 Special Chapter 1 - The Book of Dictators, by herself. In that chapter she frequently says "How idiotic!" In the anime she is first seen in episode 11. She has a very strong sense of balance, and tends to leap very slowly and gracefully or twirl atop of furniture without much trouble. She will answer "Yes" or "No" questions in German rather than Japanese. It seems that she doesn't have any issues with the Professor's intentions, and seems to enjoy watching his plans unfold. She has an uncannily calm persona, and doesn't show much consideration for typical human affairs, such as death, pain, destruction, and so on. She and Dalian appear to share a very vicious and spiteful relationship.
Professor (教授, Kyōju)
Voiced by: Go Shinomiya
Raziel's Keykeeper. A man with long light blonde hair braided into a plait over his left shoulder, a mole on the lower left-hand corner of his mouth, and dark circles under his faded purple eyes. He was an old bartender at the camp Huey was assigned to during the war. His reason for contracting with Raziel is to create more Phantom Books and bring destruction wherever they go. It is indicated throughout the first anime season that he and Raziel gave out Phantom Books or manipulated people into creating more, causing mayhem both indirectly as well as directly. Outwardly he tends to look and act pleasantly but in reality he speaks and acts in a cold-blooded and arduous manner. Because Huey and Dalian's intentions with the Phantom Books are not like his own, he considers them a nuisance and attempts to kill them on several occasions. It is implied he has greater intentions than simply creating new Phantom Books, as he speaks of "creating a new world."
Camilla Sauer Keynes (カミラ・ザウアー・ケインズ, kamira Zauā Keinzu)
Voiced by: Mamiko Noto
A childhood friend of Huey, Camilla is a woman with large green eyes and bright blonde hair, which she keeps non-traditionally short, claiming it is a trend from the New World that will soon catch on. Similarly, she also dresses in fashions or "trends" from across the globe, which she picked up while traveling. Dalian usually calls her a spinster, and seems to harbor a dislike for Camilla, but she does not let this bother her and tries to get on Dalian's good side by presenting her with sweets, a weakness of Dalian's that she picked up on fairly quickly. She works as a teacher and runs a school for the neighborhood children. She seems to have some knowledge of the Phantom Books due to an incident with the Book of Wisdom and the Book of Equivalence. She is often seen as a very bright-spirited and cheery person, and she seems to be the least serious person in a dire situation; rather, her personality will become curiously confused or distraught.
Armand Jeremiah (アルマン・ジェレマイア, Aruman Jeremaia)
Voiced by: Takahiro Sakurai
A friend of Huey's, Armand is a man with short dark blond hair and meek dark purple eyes who was assigned to the same air base as Huey when they were both working as Air Force pilots during the war. His father is the owner of a famous shipbuilding company. Because Huey was his superior commanding officer during the war, he has a habit of calling him "Lieutenant," despite Huey's attempts to get him to drop the title. He seems to have some knowledge of the Phantom Books due to an incident when a courtesan he was infatuated with requested him to bring her the Salamander's Tablet (and he even used the Phantom Book himself while protecting her from a magician), as well as the Book of Relationship. He is often seen as a very dramatic and love-sick person, especially in the presence of his current crush.
Jessica Elphinstone (ジェシカ・エルフィンストン, Jeshika Erufinsuton)
A student at the boarding school where Huey's aunt Ms. Rodean serves as the principal. Both first appear in novel Volume 4. At the end of the chapter Huey's aunt Ms. Rodean asks him if he has thought of marriage, and suggests Jessica to him.

== Media ==
=== Light novels ===
Between February 29, 2008, and February 28, 2011, eight light novels were serialized in The Sneaker. They were subsequently published under Kadokawa Shoten's Kadokawa Sneaker Bunko imprint, with the eighth volume released on July 1, 2011.

No.	Release date	ISBN
1	November 1, 2008	978-4-04-424113-1
Chapter 1: Worship of Gourmet Food; Chapter 2: Pedigree; Chapter 3: The Book of Wisdom; First appearance of Camilla Sauer Keynes.: Special Chapter 1: The Book of Dictators; First appearance of this girl with a phantom book. She is not named and is not Dalian. Her description matches that of Raziel. Huey and Dalian do not appear in this chapter.: Chapter 4: The Turn-up Book, The Pop-up Book; Huey inherits his grandfather's estate, including Dalian.: Special Chapter 2: The Lifetime Book; Chapter 5: The Book Burners; First appearance of Hal Kamhout and Flamberge. Huey and Dalian do not appear in this chapter.: Author's Notes
2	January 1, 2009	978-4-04-424114-8
Chapter 1: Rose Princess; Chapter 2: Beauty Under the Moonlight, Queen of the Night; Special Chapter 1: The Lovers; Chapter 3: The Book of Equivalence; Chapter 4: The Book of Children; Special Chapter 2: Method to Win, The Gambler's Fallacy; A young man addressed only as 'Professor'; his first appearance. A girl is with him. The only clue to her identity is her phrase "Too stupid, too stupid", which mimics the phrase "How idiotic!" used by the girl in Volume 1 Special Chapter 1, and by Raziel.: Chapter 5: Bibliotheca Razielis Arcangeli; Author's Notes
3	May 1, 2009	978-4-04-424115-5
Chapter 1: The Book of Soul Transference; Chapter 2: The Book of Oblivion; Chapter 3: The Book of Twilight; Special Chapter 1: The Book of Sleep; Chapter 4: The Magician's Daughter; Special Chapter 2: The Beautiful Girl's World; Chapter 5: The Book of Atonement; Author's Notes
4	January 1, 2010	978-4-04-424116-2
Chapter 1: Gap of Calligraphy (間隙の書); Chapter 2: Phantom Songs (幻曲); Chapter 3: Now and Forever Book (連理の書); Special Chapter 1: The Book of Hypnotism; Chapter 4: Perfumer (調香師); Special Chapter 2: Passion of the Mansion Fairy (屋敷妖精の受難); Chapter 5: Phantom Thief (幻書泥棒); Author's Notes
5	May 1, 2010	978-4-04-424117-9
6	December 1, 2010	978-4-04-424118-6
7	April 1, 2011	978-4-04-424119-3
8	July 1, 2011	978-4-04-424120-9

=== Manga ===
The Mystic Archives of Dantalian has received three manga adaptions, all of which have reached completion. The first, sharing the name of the novels, began serialization in Shōnen Ace on March 26, 2010, and ran for five volumes until July 26, 2012. The second, Dantalian Days, began serialization in Comp Ace on March 26, 2010, and ran for two volumes until October 26, 2011. The third, a yonkoma spinoff titled Dalian-chan no Shoka, began serialization in 4-koma nano ace on July 7, 2011, and ran for one volume until July 9, 2012.

==== The Mystic Archives of Dantalian ====
No.	Release date	ISBN
1	October 26, 2010	978-4-04-715548-0
Act 1: The Book of Soul Transference; Act 1, The Book of Soul Transference, is divided into 4 parts.: Act 2: The Pop-Up Book; Act 2, The Pop-Up Book, is divided into 5 parts, 2 parts in this volume and 3 parts in the next volume.: Bonus Strip; The 'Bonus Strip' is usually attached to the end of 'The Pop-Up Book, part 2'
2	March 26, 2011	978-4-04-715653-1
The Pop-Up Book; This is the 3 concluding parts after the 2 parts in the previous volume.: The Pop-Up Book - Epilogue; The Book of Lifespan; The Book of Eleventh Hour, The Folding Book; 'The Book of Eleventh Hour, The Folding Book' is 1 part, with 2 more parts in the next volume.: The Book of Dalian's Journey; 'The Book of Dalian's Journey' is a few pages typically attached to the end of the previous chapter.
3	July 26, 2011	978-4-04-715745-3
4	February 25, 2012	978-4-04-120124-4
5	August 25, 2012	978-4-04-120327-9

==== Dantalian no Shoka: Dalian Days ====
No.	Release date	ISBN
1	November 26, 2010	978-4-04-715572-5
2	November 26, 2011	978-4-04-120013-1

==== Dalian-chan no Shoka ====
No.	Release date	ISBN
1	August 25, 2012	978-4-04-120348-4

=== Anime ===
In June 2010, Kadokawa announced that an anime television adaption was being developed. Produced by Gainax under the direction of Yutaka Uemura, The series aired its broadcast run on TV Tokyo from July 16, 2011, to October 1, 2011. The series is also streamed with English subtitles by the media websites Crunchyroll and NicoNico. The opening theme is "Cras numquam scire" (To Never Know Tomorrow) by Yucca (feat. Daisuke Ono) while the ending theme is "yes, prisoner" by maRIONnetTe. Funimation has licensed the series for North America and released the series on subtitled DVD on February 14, 2017.

An OVA, "Ibarahime", was produced as a cross-promotion with the release of the manga The Mystical Archives of Dantalian, volume 5.

No.	Title	Original release date	Ref.
1	"Turn-up Book"; Transliteration: "Shikake Ehon" (Japanese: 仕掛け絵本)	July 16, 2011	
Six months after receiving a letter with news of his grandfather's death, Huey arrives at his grandfather's estate, only to discover a young girl among his grandfather's library. To his surprise, the young girl claims to be the one called Dalian, whom his grandfather had entrusted to Huey to take care of, along with the Bibliotheca Mystica de Dantalian. After becoming acquainted, Huey is invited to Henry Conrad's estate, Conrad being an old acquaintance of his grandfather. Dalian insists on tagging along, saying that Conrad was the one who killed his grandfather. They arrive to find everyone to be slaughtered and the estate to be in shambles; Dalian explains that it is the work of a Phantom Book Conrad stole from the library, which had gone on a rampage due to Conrad's incapability of wielding it. As they venture through the mansion and fight off the fabrications of the Phantom Book, Dalian decides that Huey is worthy of inheriting the Bibliotheca Mystica de Dantalian and becoming her Keykeeper. Together they restore the Phantom Book to its original form and seal its powers away.
2	"Book of Fetus"; Transliteration: "Taiji no Sho" (Japanese: 胎児の書)	July 23, 2011	
Huey's grandfather was commissioned to appraise books of the late grandfather of Estella Lilbarn, a woman who now lives alone in the estate after inheriting her grandfather's possessions. Huey goes with Dalian in his grandfather's place to the home of Estella's grandfather. However, they soon discover from Estella's cousin that a string of mysterious murders have been occurring on the estate, due to a cursed book that belonged to their late grandfather. Believing that a Phantom Book may be involved, Huey and Dalian begin investigating on the mysterious curse.
3	"Book of Wisdom / Queen of the Night"; Transliteration: "Eichi no Sho / Gekkabijin" (Japanese: 叡智の書 / 月下美人)	July 30, 2011	
In Book of Wisdom: Huey and Dalian visit a local bookstore, and are bickering with each other when they run into Camilla, an old friend of Huey's. She invites them to her villa for tea, and tells them of a friend who had opened a school to compete with the one she was running, and had claimed to have gotten hold of a Phantom Book that made her children smarter when they read it. However, the children reportedly became too smart for the teacher, and seemed to have taken on completely different personalities. Huey and Dalian arrive at the schoolhouse to investigate. Based on Volume 1 Chapter 3 of the novel. In Queen of the Night: Huey finds Dalian tending to a rare African cactus in their greenhouse, which is said to bloom only one night every thirteen years. Suddenly, two burglars break into the house and take them hostage, in search of a valuable book called Queen of the Night.
4	"Book of Soul Exchange"; Transliteration: "Kankon no Sho" (Japanese: 換魂の書)	August 6, 2011	
Dalian is currently reading a trilogy by the name of "Crown of the Dog Days," but she is enraged with Huey for only ordering the first two books. Huey explains that the author, Lenny Lents, was killed before he could write the last installment, and tells her of a letter written by the author to his grandfather requesting for his help, claiming to be imprisoned by a bizarre book. They arrive at his estate to find a woman named Paula Lents, claiming to be his wife, washing a bloody machete. She tells them that Lenny is currently writing the last installment in the series, and to return the following day, so they could prepare for their visit. However, as Huey and Dalian inspect her garage later that night, they find the dead body of Lenny Lents. They decide to further investigate the matter, certain a Phantom Book is the cause of the problem. Note: This episode pays homage to Stephen King's novel, Misery.
5	"The Magician's Daughter"; Transliteration: "Majutsu-shi no Musume" (Japanese: 魔術師の娘)	August 13, 2011	
An old friend of Huey's by the name of Armand Jeremiah arrives at their estate, and begs them for a Phantom Book. It is revealed that he will be giving it to the infamous courtesan Viola Duplessis, who has requested her suitors for Phantom Books in order to make them eligible to marry her. Because Armand was not the first suitor to travel to their estate in search of Phantom Books, Huey and Dalian decide to go with Armand and meet Viola, in order to figure out why she has been asking her suitors for Phantom Books.
6	"Libricide"; Transliteration: "Funsho-kan" (Japanese: 焚書官)	August 20, 2011	
A Libricide Officer named Hal Kamhout arrives in a town by a lake, with a girl named Flamberge riding in the sidecar, bound by chains and belts and wearing a lock on her chest. The two of them are searching for a young man and strangely dressed young girl. From the image shown while Hal is saying this the girl could be Dalian, or Raziel. They are stopped by Mabel Nash, a female cop, and Flam's attire and Hal's peculiar staff draws Mabel's attention. She offers them a place to stay while they wait for a traveling salesman to stop by town, so they can buy gasoline. Hal asks about the multiple disappearances of travelers in the town since the war ended. Soon he begins to notice something strange about the town, and begins to investigate.
7	"The Perfumer"; Transliteration: "Chōkō-shi" (Japanese: 調香師)	August 27, 2011	
Huey and Dalian go to a shop famed for its agepan (translated as 'buns' in the anime, 'fried bread' in the manga), to buy some. After a long wait they have just bought some, when a young woman rushes up to them, asking for their protection; she is being chased. She is revealed to be Fiona, a talented Perfumer who is able to tell someone's emotions just by their smell. Fiona makes perfume for a cosmetics company in London called Famenias, best known for their perfume. After meeting with Fiona's father, the president of the company, he tells them of an ancient text his grandfather had and on which the company was built. Believing that the book Fiona now possesses is a Phantom Book, that she should perhaps not possess, Huey and Dalian visit Fiona's estate to investigate.
8	"Book of Equivalence / Book of Connection"; Transliteration: "Tōka no Sho / Renri no Sho" (Japanese: 等価の書 / 連理の書)	September 3, 2011	
In Book of Equivalence: Camilla visits Huey and Dalian at their estate. She bears two gifts for Dalian—the first a box of sweet buns—and is about to give her the second when she notices that Dalian is reading an auction catalog with teddy bears in it. After asking Dalian which her favorite is, she asks Huey for something on his person, which he responds to by presenting her with a paper clip, and abruptly leaves. It is revealed that Camilla had bought the Book of Equivalence from a used book store, so Huey and Dalian set out to find what she is looking for. In Book of Connection: Armand stumbles into Huey's estate, begging for help, just as a series of branches shoot out from his body and set themselves on fire. Upon questioning, Armand reveals that he has a girlfriend by the name of Lianna Schoales, a woman he had met through a Phantom Book called the Book of Connection. However, the book carries a powerful curse that will attempt to kill the person who is cheating on the relationship. Thus, he approached Huey and Dalian, and together the three of them attempt to find a solution to the cursed book.
9	"Book of Twilight"; Transliteration: "Tasogare no Sho" (Japanese: 黄昏の書)	September 10, 2011	
Ira, an apprentice shaman with curly red hair, is seen picking flowers in a prairie. She walks into her uncle Gianni while running back into the town, who is searching for her grandmother, the current shaman. Her uncle demands for a liquid substance called elegan, in order to throw it at the giant insect-like creatures called Baziumu that were supposedly coming to attack the town. The grandmother sends her to get a species of poisonous flowers, which are the main ingredient to elegan, and runs into Dalian and Huey, who then ask her if she knows of a book gathering in the town. Dalian then warns Ira that the poison will be ineffective and leaves in search of books. The next day, Ira sets off with Elegans in hand to meet her beloved apprentice merchant, Tito. However, the town has been destroyed by a large number of Baziumu...
10	"Phantom Score"; Transliteration: "Maboroshi-kyoku" (Japanese: 幻曲)	September 17, 2011	
Huey and Dalian meet a strange pair - Dalario and Christabella, after which they learn that Christabella is a famous performer. Rumour has it that she can play Baldini's two remaining scores - 'Twilight' and 'Utopia'. Those have the power to control the listeners, and one of them can give you the greatest pleasure, while the other can put you in the pit of despair. That's why they are called Phantom Scores. But Dalian and Huey unravel a great secret and must fight to save innocent lives from the demonic powers of the Phantom Scores.
11	"The Mystic Archives of Raziel"; Transliteration: "Rajieru no Shoka" (Japanese: ラジエルの書架)	September 24, 2011	
The episode begins with Huey, having just entered the airforce and, to everyone's astonishment, outflying the army's best pilot - Ilas. The two meet afterwards and Ilas reveals that he has a talent for reading people's mind by seeing them fly. Since, as a little boy, he saw an article about the invention of first airplane, he has always wanted to fly. So he became a soldier, a pilot, and started recording the voices of war in his poems. One night the archangel Raziel comes to him, revealing that he is on his way to create a Phantom Book. They are born from words of man, soaked in despair and fear, so she hopes that he can indeed finish the Book, so that she can take it in Bibliotheca Razielis Archangeli. Ilas goes on to fight in the war, experience more of it, to kill more in it, so he could write more poems. But Huey sees through a lie that even Ilas couldn't and reads his own Phantom Book, that has the power to bring flying men down. Huey succeeds and Ilas falls on the ground, to find himself in front of Raziel and the Professor, whom he had met earlier but as a bartender and not Raziel's keykeeper. They blame him that he couldn't finish his Phantom Book and, with just a touch, the Professor takes his life, saying that he was already dead and was simply resurrected by him. Ilas remembers Huey's words that he had already died in Paris with his loved one, and then he vanishes.
12	"Song of the Unseen Tomorrow"; Transliteration: "Mada Minu Ashita no Uta" (Japanese: まだ見ぬ明日の詩)	October 1, 2011	
While Huey is reading a newspaper article about an immortal man who doesn't die after suffering multiple gunshot wounds, Dalian is busy buying buns after spotting an ad for a new shop in the paper. However, once her shopping is finished, a crowd of zombies appear in the vicinity. Dalian believes that the Book of Atonement has been printed onto copies of the newspaper, so they go out in search of the factory printing the newspapers. There they meet the Professor and Raziel, who seem to have ulterior motives serving against the benefit of London. Upon realizing that Huey would be a threat to their cause, the Professor shoots him, but Huey grabs Dalian and together the two of them attempt to escape from the hoard of zombies running the newspaper factory. Suffering from his fatal wounds, Huey asks Dalian that he go into the archives and retrieve the girl inside, who up until that point had been the one handing the books to Huey when he called upon them. Huey and the girl try to leave the archives, but the guardian of the gates to the archives send Huey into an infinite space, where he forgets all that he has known. Distraught, Dalian, back in the human world, agrees with the girl inside the archives to work together to bring him back. Thus, Huey's child form appears before him with the Phantom Book needed to escape, thus allowing Huey to remember who he is. Huey returns to the human world and kills all the zombies; meanwhile, Hal and Flam arrive at the factory and burn all of the newspapers, briefly encountering Professor and Raziel before they depart from the scene. Thus, the three Biblioprincesses and Key Keepers go their separate ways, but are bound by fate to meet again.
OVA	"Appendix: Briar Rose / La Belle au bois dormant" Transliteration: "Ibarahime"	August 25, 2012 (Direct to Video)	TBA
A man, Sergeant Callavos, is shown dying in a fire in his mansion. Six months later Huey and Dalian hike to a remote village on Sergeant Callavos' land, to retrieve a phantom book that they believe his daughter Florence possesses. They meet the local herbal healer, a young woman named Thalia. She tells them that Florence hardly ever ventures from her castle. They look and see Florence standing in the distant window of a tall vine-covered tower. They are repeatedly warned, by several people, that it is easy to get lost, that people in the past have gone and not come back. Huey and Dalian remark on an ironic connection to the Grimm Brothers story of 'Briar Rose'.
