= I Became a Legend After My 10 Year-Long Last Stand =

Japanese light novel series

- First light novel volume cover, featuring (from left to right) Sia Wolcott, Luck Lock Franzen, and Celliss Morton

ここは俺に任せて先に行けと言ってから10年がたったら伝説になっていた。 (Koko wa Ore ni Makasete Saki ni Ike to Itte kara Jū-nen ga Tattara Densetsu ni Natteita)
- Genre: High fantasy
- Novel series
- Written by: Ezogingitune
- Published by: Shōsetsuka ni Narō
- Original run: June 21, 2018 – January 15, 2021
- Light novel
- Written by: Ezogingitune
- Illustrated by: DeeCHA
- Published by: SB Creative
- Imprint: GA Novel
- Original run: February 15, 2019 – present
- Volumes: 8
- Manga
- Written by: Ezogingitune; Kitsune Tennōji (composition)
- Illustrated by: Chako Abeno
- Published by: Square Enix
- English publisher: NA: Comikey; Square Enix
- Imprint: Gangan Comics UP!
- Magazine: Manga Up!
- Original run: August 3, 2019 – present
- Volumes: 20
- Anime television series
- Directed by: Hiroyuki Kanbe
- Written by: Mitsutaka Hirota
- Music by: Tomotaka Ōsumi
- Studio: Gekkou
- Licensed by: Crunchyroll
- Original network: Tokyo MX, KBS Kyoto, SUN, TVA, BS11, AT-X
- Original run: July 6, 2026 – September 21, 2026
- Episodes: 12
- icon

I Became a Legend After My 10 Year-Long Last Stand (Japanese: ここは俺に任せて先に行けと言ってから10年がたったら伝説になっていた。, Hepburn: Koko wa Ore ni Makasete Saki ni Ike to Itte kara Jū-nen ga Tattara Densetsu ni Natteita) is a Japanese light novel series written by Ezogingitune and illustrated by DeeCHA. It was serialized on the user-generated novel publishing website Shōsetsuka ni Narō from June 2018 to January 2021. The series was later acquired and published by SB Creative under their GA Novel imprint in February 2019. A manga adaptation illustrated by Chako Abeno and with composition by Kitsune Tennōji began serialization on Square Enix's Manga Up! manga website and app in August 2019. An anime television series adaptation produced by Gekkou aired from July to September 2026.

== Plot ==
The Hero Party consisting of the Hero Erik, Warrior Golan and Mage Luck manages to defeat the demon lord named the Majin Ruler who had invaded from another dimension. However, large hordes of demons named Majin continue to advance. Sensing the impending danger, Luck tells his friends Erik and Golan to flee, remaining alone in the space between the dimensions to continue to fight the demons and hold the line until they can reach safety. After fighting so hard that he loses track of time, Luck manages to defeat all the demons and protect the world. When he returns, ten years have passed and he is hailed as a hero and a Great Sage. After reuniting with his friends, he must choose a new path in life, starting with a clean slate. But in the midst of one of his quests, he bumped into Sia Wolcott, a Werewolf hunter hunting vampires.

== Characters ==
Luck Lock Franzen (ラック・ロック・フランゼン, Rakku Rokku Furanzen)
Voiced by: Gakuto Kajiwara
The main protagonist of the story. He was a mage that held the line against the Majin Army and the Majin Ruler, to help his friends escape the Interdimension. A decade later, he reappears once again to a surprise, that on his time gone, he became a legend. Hating the stresses a nobility burdens, he decides to become Lock Franzen and restart his adventurer career.
Celliss Morton (セルリス・モートン, Serurisu Mōton)
Voiced by: Yui Ishikawa
Golan Morton's daughter. She wanted to become like her father due to his stories of adventures with the Hero Party.
Sia Wolcott (シア・ウルコット, Shia Urukotto)
Voiced by: Mayu Sagara
The B-ranked werewolf adventurer/warrior that initially appears to avenge her honor against a vampire lord her tribe hunted. Lock assisted her with it, and became one of his friends.
Luccira (ルッチラ, Rutchira)
Voiced by: Mao Ichimichi
The sole survivor of the massacre upon his Nomadic Demon tribe by the vampires, was tasked to guard Gerberga, the Chicken God.
Milca (ミルカ, Miruka)
Voiced by: Yurie Kozakai
A former street urchin who was orphaned after her family became bankrupt. Lock took her in as his house apprentice.
Erik Mendilibar (エリック・メンディリバル, Erikku Mendiribaru)
Voiced by: Toshiyuki Morikawa
The Hero of the Kingdom, and friend to Luck and Golan. He eventually became the King of the Mendilibar Dynasty. To atone for abandoning Luck, he decides to help his friend re-establish his life.
Golan Morton (ゴラン・モートン, Goran Mōton)
Voiced by: Tsuyoshi Koyama
The Warrior of the group. He eventually marries Celerise's mother and became the guild leader. A strong but simple-minded guy who is close friends with the Hero Party.
Arone (アローネ, Arōne)
Voiced by: Wakana Maruoka
Ario (アリオ)
Voiced by: Yuuki Terui
Apprentice mage that Lock assisted with the Goblin extermination quest.
Ginny (ジニー, Jinī)
Voiced by: Akari Miyazaki
Archer, younger sister of Ario.
Charlotte (シャルロット, Sharurotto)
Voiced by: Miharu Hanai
Elder daughter of Erik and Levi.
Marie (マリー, Marī)
Voiced by: Suzuna Kinoshita
Gerberga (ゲルベルガ, Geruberuga)
Voiced by: Chō
The Chicken God, who can detect and dispel any time warp. Luccira was tasked to guard him by the rest of the Demon Tribe before their extermination.
Garuvu (ガルヴ)
Voiced by: Naoto Kobayashi
A Sacred Beast that Lock became a familiar.
Philly Mastafon (フィリー・マスタフォン, Firī Masutafon)
Voiced by: Rina Honnizumi
A scientific and magical genius of the Mastafon Family. She can create the Philosopher's Stone.
Levi Ardennes (レフィ・アルデンヌ, Refi Arudennu)
Voiced by: Ami Koshimizu
Healer of the group and a former priestess. Eventually became head of their religion's clergy, wife of King Erik and had daughters. She prefers fighting in close range than what her order prefers doing.

== Media ==
=== Light novel ===
Written by Ezogingitune, I Became a Legend After My 10 Year-Long Last Stand was serialized on the user-generated novel publishing website Shōsetsuka ni Narō from June 21, 2018, to January 15, 2021. It was later acquired and published by SB Creative with illustrations by DeeCHA under their GA Novel light novel imprint on February 15, 2019. Eight volumes have been released as of July 2026.

No.	Release date	ISBN
1	February 15, 2019	978-4-8156-0126-3
2	May 15, 2019	978-4-8156-0127-0
3	August 9, 2019	978-4-8156-0289-5
4	January 11, 2020	978-4-8156-0290-1
5	May 14, 2020	978-4-8156-0608-4
6	January 14, 2021	978-4-8156-0872-9
7	July 14, 2022	978-4-8156-1453-9
8	July 15, 2026	978-4-8156-3802-3

=== Manga ===
A manga adaptation illustrated by Chako Abeno and with composition by Kitsune Tennōji began serialization on Square Enix's Manga Up! manga website and app on August 3, 2019. The manga's chapters have been collected into twenty tankōbon volumes as of July 2026. The manga is published digitally in North America by Comikey and by Square Enix via their Manga Up! Global app.

No.	Release date	ISBN
1	September 12, 2019	978-4-7575-6184-7
2	December 12, 2019	978-4-7575-6427-5
3	March 12, 2020	978-4-7575-6561-6
4	July 7, 2020	978-4-7575-6728-3
5	December 7, 2020	978-4-7575-6983-6
6	June 7, 2021	978-4-7575-7288-1
7	November 6, 2021	978-4-7575-7557-8
8	March 7, 2022	978-4-7575-7771-8
9	July 7, 2022	978-4-7575-8012-1
10	November 7, 2022	978-4-7575-8242-2
11	March 7, 2023	978-4-7575-8449-5
12	August 7, 2023	978-4-7575-8717-5
13	November 7, 2023	978-4-7575-8893-6
14	March 7, 2024	978-4-7575-9084-7
15	September 6, 2024	978-4-7575-9407-4
16	December 6, 2024	978-4-7575-9553-8
17	May 7, 2025	978-4-7575-9839-3
18	October 7, 2025	978-4-301-00038-9
19	April 7, 2026	978-4-301-00439-4
20	July 7, 2026	978-4-3010-0623-7

=== Anime ===
An anime television series adaptation was announced on October 2, 2025. It is produced by Gekkou and directed by Hiroyuki Kanbe, with series composition handled by Mitsutaka Hirota, characters designed by Majiro, and music composed by Tomotaka Ōsumi. The series was originally scheduled for April 2026, but was later delayed "to present an even more enjoyable work for everyone", and was aired from July 6 to September 21, 2026, on Tokyo MX and other networks. The opening theme song is "Soredemo Donten o Koeteyuku" (それでも曇天を越えてゆく; Even So, We Go Past the Cloudy Skies), performed by Sajou no Hana, while the ending theme song is "Ari Kitari na Nichijō to Kōun na Hibi e" (在り来たりな日常と幸運な日々へ; Onwards to Ordinary and Fortunate Days), performed by Meishohikokai. Crunchyroll is streaming the series.

==== Episodes ====
No.	Title	Directed by (Note: Production staff information is taken from the ending credits of each episode.)	Written by	Storyboarded by	Original release date (Note: Episodes are released on Prime Video and Crunchyroll 3 days before their televised airings.)
1	"When I Returned Home, I'd Become a Hero"; Transliteration: "Kaettara Eiyū ni Natteita" (Japanese: 帰ったら英雄になっていた)	Yoshihiro Sasaki, Hidetoshi Ōmori, Tomonori Mine & Yūto Kimura	Mitsutaka Hirota	Hiroyuki Kanbe	July 3, 2026
After driving the Demon Lord back into his own dimension, Eric the Hero, Goran the Warrior, and Luck the Mage decide to return home. However, under relentless demonic attacks, Luck forces his friends, who both have families, to leave without him. Killing a Demon General, Luck learns a Drain Life spell, allowing him to constantly recover health from enemies. He eventually destroys the demon army and defeats the recovered Demon Lord, taking his Hexblade as a trophy. Escaping back home, Luck discovers ten years have passed. In the Royal Capital, he learns he is revered as a deceased saint. He reunites with Eric and Goran, who are now the King and the Adventurers Guild Master. Luck's Drain Life has actually made him younger, while his middle-aged friends reveal he was posthumously named Archduke and Supreme Sorcerer. Desiring a quiet life, Luck decides to remain officially dead and become an adventurer again. Goran alters his guild card, transforming "Luck" the S-Rank Supreme Sorcerer into "Lock" the F-Rank Warrior. To bypass guild restrictions on solo quests, Lock teams up with F-Rank rookies Ario and Ginny. While secretly training them during a goblin den extermination, they witness a young swordswoman battling a Goblin Lord.
2	"There Was A Formidable Foe Deep Inside The Den"; Transliteration: "Suana no Oku ni Tondemonai Teki ga Ita" (Japanese: 巣穴の奥にとんでもない敵がいた)	Masato Uchibori	Mitsutaka Hirota	Mota Shibue	July 10, 2026
Lock intervenes to kill the Goblin Lord when the girl Sia, daughter of Beastkin Chief Dantan, is nearly killed. Deducing a stronger threat nearby, Lock learns from Sia that a Vampire Lord wounded her father. She seeks to kill it to restore her tribe's honour, but accepts Lock's help. Together, they defeat the Vampire Lord, and Sia retrieves a cursed medallion from its body. The dying vampire reveals the medallion absorbs life to open a portal to the Dark Dimension, summoning gods whom even the Demon Lord served. It warns that other Vampire Lords will relentlessly hunt the medallion. Unfazed, Lock destroys the medallion with his Hexblade and executes the vampire, though Sia realizes he is Saint Luck the Supreme Sorcerer. After reporting their victory, Ario and Ginny depart. Sia keeps half the medallion for her tribe's honour and Lock uses the other to warn Goran about the Vampire Lords and Dark Gods. Goran confides in Lock that his teenage daughter, Cellis, is giving him the silent treatment because he opposed her becoming an adventurer. As his wife is travelling and cannot mediate between them, Goran asks Lock to watch Cellis. However, Cellis is hostile and accuses Lock of being Goran's illegitimate son.
3	"She Suspects I'm Her Bastard Brother, And Now We're Going On Her First Adventure"; Transliteration: "Kakushigo Giwaku o Muke Rareta Ue, Hatsu Bōken ni Tsukiau Koto ni Natta" (Japanese: 隠し子疑惑を向けられた上、初冒険に付き合うことになった)	Tomio Yamauchi	Mitsutaka Hirota	Akari Aoyama	July 17, 2026
Fearing her misunderstanding could cause Goran's divorce, Lock reveals his identity as Saint Luck to Cellis. Once she believes he is not her illegitimate brother, Lock realizes why Goran opposed her becoming an adventurer: Cellis is stubborn and easily misled by her own imagination. Since Cellis has already registered as an adventurer behind Goran's back, Lock takes her on an easy quest to investigate the appearance of "mythical beasts". Realizing the lack of casualties' points to illusion magic, Lock lets Cellis fight an illusionary dragon before defeating it himself. He coaxes the illusionist, a Demon-Fiend named Luccira, out of hiding. Luccira explains he used the illusions to scare people away to protect Gerberga the Seraphowl from vampires. He claims Gerberga can manipulate dimensional gateways, leading Lock to deduce that vampires want Gerberga to open the Dark Dimension and unleash the Dark Gods. Suddenly, vampires attack. Lock kills three, and Gerberga uses dimensional powers to eliminate the fourth. Returning to Goran's home to keep Gerberga safe, they find Sia waiting with urgent news: a Vampire High Lord has united the Vampire Lords into a massive army.
4	"After Ten Years, I'm Even in a Picture Book"; Transliteration: "10-nen Tattara Ehon ni Made Natte ita" (Japanese: 10年たったら絵本にまでなっていた)	Naoki Hishikawa	Mitsutaka Hirota	Naoki Hishikawa	July 24, 2026
Sia reveals the beastkin tribes want war against the Vampire High Lord. Fearing heavy casualties, she asks Lock to help assassinate the vampire, while also tasking him with protecting a specific chicken the vampires seek. Exasperated, Lock introduces her to Luccira and the chicken, Gerberga, proving he is already safe. Meanwhile, Cellis is upset at being left behind due to her low rank until Lock entrusts her with Gerberga's safety. Cellis reconciles with Goran after realizing Lock isn't his son, though she incorrectly assumes they are lovers, taking over an hour to convince otherwise. Sia explains that if the High Lord drinks Gerberga's blood, his medallion will instantly gain the necessary power to open a portal to the Dark Gods. To ensure protection, Goran sends Gerberga to Eric to be protected by the former hero and palace security. Lock meets Eric's daughters, Charlotte and Mary, who love a storybook about Saint Luck, which Lock is upset to learn was made popular by Eric to ensure no one forgot his sacrifice. Soon, a hypnotized maid summons vampires inside the palace. Unarmed, Cellis defends Charlotte, Mary, and Gerberga until Lock arrives to aid her, praising her courage.
5	"After Ten Years, I Was Told To Get Lost"; Transliteration: "10-nen Tatte Saki ni Ike to Iwareta" (Japanese: 10年たって先に行けと言われた)	Yasuhiro Miyafuji	Mitsutaka Hirota	Yasuhiro Miyafuji	August 31, 2026
Lock kills the vampires with a single spell. When more arrive through a portal, he disguises himself as the Eighth Vampire Lord to question them. They reveal they were sent by the Sixth Lord. Lock kills them, instructs Eric to search for more hypnotized servants, and has Goran protect Gerberga. Stepping through the portal alone, Lock defeats the Sixth Lord in a duel and destroys his medallion. He weeps upon realizing the Sixth had converted a human village into vampires, all of whom turn to ash upon the Lord's death. Returning to the castle, Lock discovers several more converted servants also turned to ash, while 30 hypnotized humans fainted, including the maid Roana. Lock decides to assassinate the Vampire High Lord directly. Eric and Goran reform their old party to join him alongside Sia. Goran gives Cellis his sword so she and Luccira can guard the princesses. Lock brings Gerberga for safety, maintaining the illusion he remains at the castle, and equips Sia with the Sixth Lord's sword. While the beastkin army distracts lesser vampires and the party engages the Lords, Lock and Sia, both immune to hypnosis, reach the High Lord. To Lock's surprise, cutting off the High Lord's arm with the Demon King's Hexblade fails, as the limb regenerates.
6	"After Ten Years, I Started a Family"; Transliteration: "10-nen Tattara Kazoku ga Dekita" (Japanese: 10年たったら家族ができた)	Studio Shigure	Mitsutaka Hirota	Hiroshi Aoyama	August 7, 2026
Upon realizing Lock has Gerberga, the High Lord reveals the Dark Gods also bestow Divine Blessings, and uses their Dark Anathema crystal to cast a spell paralysing all non-vampires. However, a Holy Barrier, cast by Eric's wife Priestess Queen Lefy, erupts from a nearby cathedral, surrounding the Anathema and blocking the High Lord's power. Using Gerberga's power, Lock shatters the Anathema and slays the High Lord. Nearby, Lock frees a Divine Beast wolf puppy captured for its hypnosis immunity, adopts him and names him Garbh. Back at the castle, Goran proudly learns Cellis defeated two Arch Vampires. Recognizing the strength and hypnosis immunity of beastkin fighting alongside humans, Eric offers them roles in the royal army. Meanwhile, in the city, a terrified girl flees from thugs. Lock requests a modest house to live in with Luccira, Gerberga, and Garbh, but is outraged when Eric bestows a grand mansion due to Lock's Archduke status, with Cellis insisting she should also live there to continue training. That night, Lock and Luccira hear a girl crying out in pain from the basement.
7	"The Trespasser and the Secret Passageway"; Transliteration: "Shinnyuūsha to Himitsu no Tsūro" (Japanese: 侵入者と秘密の通路)	Yūya Okada	Mitsutaka Hirota	Yuri Pinzon	August 14, 2026
After finding the terrified girl, Milca, trapped in the basement, Lock learns she was recently made homeless by her deceased grandfather's debts. She reveals an escape tunnel in the basement has collapsed into the sewers where she managed to get inside looking for a safe place to sleep. Following the mysterious tunnel, Lock breaks through a magically sealed door directly into Eric's bedroom in the palace. An embarrassed Eric explains his grandfather used the tunnel to conduct an affair with the mansion's former owner, the Baroness, even fathering a secret son, Eric's uncle, who was sent away to be adopted and avoid scandal. Eric agrees to keep the tunnel open if Lock repairs the sewer. Lock hires Milca as a cleaner, whom Cellis adopts as a little sister. During a shopping trip, the thugs she ran from earlier kidnap Milca to sell into slavery. Lock rescues her, disguising himself as a mob boss to extract information. He learns they work for Cavino, a loan shark and illegal slave trader considered untouchable due to his connections with corrupt nobles. Having failed to acquire Milca, Cavino decides to move his existing slaves elsewhere, but Lock intercepts them.
8	"The Party is Complete for the First Time in 10 Years"; Transliteration: "10-nen Buri ni Pāti ga Sorotta" (Japanese: 10年ぶりにパーティが揃った)	Yoshihiro Sasaki	Mitsutaka Hirota	Kōji Hōri	August 21, 2026
Sia and Cellis defeat Cavino's B-rank thugs while Garbh blocks their escape. Authorities arrest Cavino and search his mansion, uncovering the enslaved children and illegal flesh from a murdered sacred beast meant for use in dark magic. Abandoned by his noble allies to save themselves, Cavino is imprisoned for life. News of his downfall swiftly spreads to another powerful vampire. Meanwhile, Lock repairs the collapsed sewer wall and accidentally disturbs Eric's wife, Queen Lefy, while installing a mithril shield as a door to the tunnel in Eric's bedroom. Sia and Luccira are shocked to suddenly meet the Queen, but Lock is informal with her as Lefy was the Hero party healer before she married Eric and became queen. Lock enchants the mithril door so only he, Eric, Lefy, Goran and princesses Charlotte and Mary can open it in emergencies. Goran arrives searching for Lock, reuniting the Hero party for the first time in ten years. Given the sacred beast flesh and slaves meant for sacrifices, Eric concludes another Vampire Lord is planning a demon summoning ritual and authorizes Lock to secretly investigate Cavino's noble contacts. Returning home, Lock and the others are shocked to find Cellis has bathed and dressed Milca, transforming the street urchin into a young lady.
9	"Mythical Beasts that Lurk in the Darkness"; Transliteration: "Yami ni Hisomu Majū-tachi" (Japanese: 闇に潜む魔獣たち)	Shōgo Shimizu	Mitsutaka Hirota	Chiyo Ishida	August 28, 2026
To prevent his former allies murdering him, Cavino is moved to the palace dungeons. Meanwhile, Sia and Cellis investigate missing person reports as potential sacrifice kidnappings, while Lock constructs a hidden cold storage pantry for their kitchen. Ario and Ginny accept a quest to clear sewer rat monsters, but encounter tens of thousands of unusually large, aggressive monsters. Learning the pair has been missing for hours, Sia, Cellis, and Lock enter the sewers on a rescue mission. They save Ario and Ginny and defeat a B-Rank Rat King with an explosion so massive it reaches the surface and damages Marquis Mastafone's mansion. Lock finds magical relic fragments in the rat's stomach, explaining why it grew so large. Lock attempts to apologize to Mastafone, but a suspicious maid denies any damage occurred, despite clear visible evidence, and sends him away. Inside, the powerful vampire orders the maid to investigate Lock immediately. After Arone recalls that three missing person reports regarding Mastafone's mansion were abruptly retracted, Lock deduces Mastafone is under vampire hypnosis. Milca restores the broken relic fragments, which Sia identifies as a ritual statue used to summon Dark Gods. The vampire dispatches an army of Anathema empowered maids to attack.
10	"Storming the Enemy Position"; Transliteration: "Tekijin Totsunyū" (Japanese: 敵陣突入)	Aya Kawamura	Mitsutaka Hirota	Naoaki Shibuta	September 5, 2026
A prisoner smuggles a letter via a dog to Eric. Despite their suspicions of Mastafone, Lock needs evidence before Eric can issue a royal search warrant for Mastafone's mansion. Sia notes all missing persons were mansion servants, and Milca deduces they were abducted along the same street on their work commute, taken into the sewers and then to Mastafone's cellar. The need for a warrant vanishes when Mastafone's empowered maids attack their meeting. Eavesdropping through a bat familiar, the vampire is baffled as simple humans defeat his servants. Outside, Garbh finds the dog, whom Eric recognizes as Mastafone's pet, Spot. The letter reveals Mastafone and his wife are imprisoned in their cellar while the vampire uses their daughter, Philly, as a vessel to summon a demon. Eric and Lock storm the mansion, cutting through empowered servants. Following a strong magical signal, Lock pushes deeper into the estate while Eric slays the vampire Lord and rescues Mastafone. Mastafone explains that a year prior, he hired an exceptionally skilled butler who systematically took over the household. The butler eventually revealed himself as a vampire Lord, imprisoned the couple, and trapped Philly inside a mirror.
11	"I Fought for Ten Years, So I Can Easily Defeat Demons"; Transliteration: "10-nen Tatakatta kara Majin wa Yoyū de Taoseru" (Japanese: 10年戦ったから魔神は余裕で倒せる)	Haruta Segi	Mitsutaka Hirota	Satoshi Nakagawa	September 12, 2026
While with Mastafone, Eric survives the Vampire Lord's ambush thanks to Lefy's protective clothing and slays his attacker. Simultaneously, Lock enters the mirror to battle an Anathema-empowered vampire army. Outside, vampires breach the city's barrier. Goran updates Lefy, who defends the city by enchanting everyone's weapons with holy magic. Mastafone reveals that Philly created a "Fool’s Stone" that amplifies curses, the source of most of the recent evil artifacts Lock has encountered. Consequently, Philly is being used as the perfect sacrifice to summon the Dark Gods. Through the mirror, Lock interrupts the ritual and battles a vampire sorcerer. When the sorcerer neutralizes Lock's Hexblade, Lock simply fights bare-handed, easily dispatching summoned demons. Using Drain Touch, Lock turns the sorcerer to ash. However, the sorcerer's medallion provides enough power for the Dark God to begin manifesting. Philly begs Lock to kill her to stop the summoning, but he refuses. Lock retrieves his restored Hexblade, but the Dark God suddenly strikes, shooting Lock through the stomach and seemingly killing him.
12	"Leave the Next Ten Years and Beyond to Me Too"; Transliteration: "Kore kara no 10-nen mo Sono-saki mo Ore ni Makasero" (Japanese: これからの10年もその先も俺に任せろ)	Hidetoshi Ōmori & Yūma Kanō	Mitsutaka Hirota	Hikaru Takeuchi	September 19, 2026
Philly attempts suicide to stop the Dark God’s summoning, but Lock recovers by using Drain Touch on the God's severed tentacle. Replicating the God’s own spell, Lock forces it to drop Philly. While Lefy repairs the city barrier, Goran, Cellis, and Sia defend the cathedral while Eric defends the mirror. As despair sets in, Goran rallies everyone by reminding them Lock fought demons for ten years alone. Realizing the God continuously regenerates, Lock uses a gravity distortion spell to crush the God into liquid before obliterating it with wind magic. With the Dark God destroyed, all vampires vanish, saving the world. Lock and Philly safely return from the mirror. Goran accidentally calls Lock "Luck," revealing to Mastafone that Lock is the legendary Great Sage. Eric and Goran scold Lock for his reckless independence, though Eric fears a human-vampire war is now inevitable. After Philly holds a funeral for her fallen servants, Eric places her under house arrest as Lock’s assistant to atone for creating the Fool’s Stone. She seamlessly blends into Lock’s chaotic family, bringing him quiet contentment.

== Reception ==
By May 2025, the series has over 4 million copies in circulation.

== See also ==
- Scooped Up by an S-Rank Adventurer!, another light novel series with the same illustrator
