= Welcome to Wakaba-Soh =

Japanese manga series

ようこそ。若葉荘へ (Yōkoso Wakaba Sō e)
- Manga
- Written by: Chako Abeno
- Published by: Hōbunsha
- English publisher: Yen Press
- Magazine: Manga Time Kirara MAX
- Original run: June 2009 – January 2010
- Volumes: 2

Welcome to Wakaba-Soh (ようこそ。若葉荘へ, Yōkoso Wakaba Sō e) is a manga series by Chako Abeno published in English by Yen Press and serialized in Manga Time Kirara MAX.

== Plot ==
Welcome to Wakaba-Soh focuses on the character of Kentarou, a young teen that discovers that the girl he has a crush on is working as the caretaker of his almost entirely female dormitory. As Kentarou tries to impress Karen, he also fails to realize that one of his childhood friends, Arai, also lives at the dormitory and has held an unrequited love for him all this time.

== Reception ==
Critical reception for Welcome to Wakaba-Soh has been negative, with Otaku USA praising the artwork while criticizing the story and characters as "boring". Popcultureshock reviewed volumes one and two of the series, giving the first volume a rating of "B" while rating volume two "D", writing that the characters were "shallow" and the series "vapid". Manga Maniac Cafe also panned the series, calling it "a humdrum read". ComicMix also reviewed Wakabah-Soh, writing that the manga "means well, and it has its moments, but it ends up being very scatterbrained". Mania.com stated that the girls were "cute" and that the manga will appeal to some, but that the story was "dull".
