= Chako Abeno =

Japanese illustrator and manga artist

- 阿倍野ちゃこ
- Occupation: Manga artist
- Known for: My-Otome Zwei; Sola
- Website: www.lifox.co.jp/abeno_chaco/index.html

Chako Abeno (阿倍野ちゃこ, Abeno Chako) is a Japanese illustrator and manga artist. In addition to manga and illustrations, Abeno publishes doujinshi with the circle "Kappa Kurieito" (カッパくりえいと). She is also involved in the artwork of adult games.

Since beginning her manga career in 2002 with In White: Pure Story, Abeno has worked primarily within the fantasy, romance, and action genres for the shounen demographic, as well as shoujo and seinen.

In addition to writing and drawing original manga, Abeno has been involved in the manga adaptations of older manga and other mediums, including video games and light novels, as a character designer, cover illustrator, and artist.

== Works ==
=== Manga ===
- In White: Pure Story (インホワイトピュアストーリー) (2002, Kadokawa Shoten), Artist
- Amahara Mahou Kottouten (天原魔法骨董店) (2003, Kadokawa Shoten), Author and Artist
- Chrome Breaker (クロム・ブレイカー) (2005-2009, Kadokawa Shoten), Author and Artist
- Yokoso Wakaba Soh e (ようこそ。若葉荘へ, Welcome to Wakaba-Soh) (2005-2007, Hōbunsha), Author and Artist
- Sola (2006-2008, ASCII Media Works), Artist
- My-Otome Zwei (舞-乙HiME Zwei) (2007, Champion RED), Artist
- Howaito Arubamu (ホワイトアルバム, White Album) (2008-2010, ASCII Media Works), Artist
- Dantarian no Shoka (ダンタリアンの書架, The Mystic Archives of Dantalian) (2010-2012, Kadokawa Shoten), Artist
- A+B (Ａ＋Ｂ（エンジェル＋ブラッド）, Angel+Blood) (2012, Kadokawa Shoten), Author and Artist
- Gate: featuring The Starry Heavens (ゲート featuring The Starry Heavens) (2012, AlphaPolis), Author and Artist
- Atelier Escha & Logy: Alchemists of the Dusk Sky (エスカ＆ロジーのアトリエ ～黄昏の空の錬金術士～, Escha & Logy no Atelier: Tasogare no Sora no Renkinjutsushi) (2012, Dengeki Maoh), Artist
- Draw: Majo no Nemuru Umi de (DRAW 魔女の眠る海で, Draw: The Ocean Where the Witch Sleeps) (2013-2016, Young Champion Retsu), Artist
- Valkyrie no Kiko (ワルキューレのキコ, Kiko of Valkyrie) (2016-2018, Young Champion Retsu), Artist
- Trinity Seven: Liese Chronicle (トリニティセブン リーゼクロニクル) (2017-2018, Dragon Age), Author and Artist
- Witch Order (ウィッチオーダー) (2018-2019, Dragon Age), Artist
- I Became a Legend after My 10 Year-Long Last Stand (ここは俺に任せて先に行けと言ってから10年がたったら伝説になっていた。) (2019–present, Manga UP!), Artist

=== Light Novel Illustrations (selected) ===
- Tensei shite Inaka de Slow Life wo Okuritai (転生して田舎でスローライフをおくりたい, I want to enjoy slow living) (2016–present, Takarajimasha), Artist
- Yakutatazu to Iwareta node, Watashi no Ie wa Dokuritsu shimasu!: Densetsu no Ryuu wo Mezamesasetara, Nazeka Saikyou no Kuni ni Natteimashita (役立たずと言われたので、わたしの家は独立します! ~伝説の竜を目覚めさせたら、なぜか最強の国になっていました~, My House Became Independent Because It Was Said to Be Useless!) (2021–present, Kadokawa Shoten), Artist

=== Games ===
- Mitama no yuki (with LiFox)
