= Asura Cryin' =

Japanese light novel series

- Cover of the first light novel cover featuring Misao Minakami.

アスラクライン (Asura Kurain)
- Genre: Action, supernatural
- Light novel
- Written by: Gakuto Mikumo
- Illustrated by: Nao Watanuki
- Published by: ASCII Media Works
- Imprint: Dengeki Bunko
- Original run: July 10, 2005 – February 10, 2010
- Volumes: 14
- Manga
- Written by: Gakuto Mikumo
- Illustrated by: Ryō Akizuki
- Published by: ASCII Media Works
- Magazine: Dengeki Daioh
- Original run: September 27, 2008 – September 27, 2010
- Volumes: 4
- Anime television series
- Directed by: Keizō Kusakawa
- Written by: Katsuhiko Koide (season 1); Deko Akao (season 2)
- Music by: Mitsutaka Tajiri
- Studio: Seven Arcs
- Licensed by: BI: MVM Entertainment; NA: Maiden Japan
- Original network: AT-X
- Original run: April 2, 2009 – December 24, 2009
- Episodes: 26

Asura Cryin' (アスラクライン, Asura Kurain) is a Japanese light novel series by Gakuto Mikumo, with illustrations by Nao Watanuki. The novel series began on July 10, 2005, with fourteen volumes currently published by ASCII Media Works under their Dengeki Bunko imprint. A manga adaptation by Ryō Akizuki premiered in ASCII Media Works' shōnen manga magazine Dengeki Daioh on September 27, 2008, and an anime adaptation began airing in Japan in April 2009.

== Plot ==
The story is a semi-serious school action story revolving around Tomoharu Natsume. He is haunted by the ghost of his childhood friend, Misao Minakami, who died in an airplane accident three years earlier, which Tomoharu barely survived. On entering high school, Tomoharu takes the opportunity to live on his own and moves into Meiou-tei, a dormitory, where he starts enjoying a carefree high school life (also, his mother has recently remarried and doesn't want him interfering in her newlywed life). His life changes when a beautiful girl named Shuri Kurosaki appears with a mysterious trunk which she claims Tomoharu's brother, Naotaka Natsume, asked her to deliver to him. Things become complicated when Kanade Takatsuki, a girl dressed like a shrine maiden, appears seeking the trunk in Tomoharu's possession. It is revealed that the trunk hides secrets about the world they live in.

== Characters ==
=== Science Club / Third Student Council President / Royal Dark Society ===
- Tomoharu Natsume (夏目 智春, Natsume Tomoharu), voiced by Miyu Irino, is the main protagonist of the series, often called "Tomo" by his closest friends. He controls Kurogane and became an Asura Cryin after he made a contract with Kanade Takatsuki which gave birth to Persephone.
- Misao Minakami (水無神 操緒, Minakami Misao), voiced by Haruka Tomatsu, is Tomoharu's childhood friend, and the primary female heroine of the series. She appears with Tomoharu as a projection/ghost-like image, and is later discovered to be the "Burial Doll" of Tomoharu's Asura Machina: Kurogane. She loves Tomo more than anything and would do anything for him.
- Kanade Takatsuki (嵩月 奏, Takatsuki Kanade), voiced by Ai Nonaka, is the second female heroine of the series. She is a demon which becomes a friend of Tomoharu Natsume. She seems to have feelings for Tomoharu. Later on in the series she and Tomoharu make a contract making Tomoharu an Asura Cryin and giving birth to Persephone, their child, owl.
- Ania Fortuna (アニア·フォルチュナ·ソメシェル·ミク·クラウゼンブルヒ, Ania Foruchuna Somesheru Miku Kurauzenburuhi), voiced by Sayuri Yahagi, is a young, genius blonde-haired demon who recently transferred to Tomoharu's school and was placed into his care to protect her from a demon hunter. She is also known as a Luck Demon, due to her ability to give or take other people's luck.
- Shuri Kurosaki (黒崎 朱浬, Kurosaki Shuri), voiced by Rie Tanaka, is Tomo, Misao, and Kanade's senpai. She was also involved in the plane crash, and nearly died.
- Takuma Higuchi (樋口 琢磨, Higuchi Takuma), voiced by Hiro Shimono, is a good friend of Tomoharu's.
- Tokiya Kagayaki (炫 塔貴也, Kagayaki Tokiya), voiced by Shinji Kawada, is Aki and Toru's childhood friend and the main antagonist of season 2.
- Tohru Kitsutaka (橘高 冬琉, Kitsutaka Tōru), voiced by Yuko Kaida, is the president of the Third Student Council, which was founded by members of the "Royal Dark Society".

=== First Student Council / Holy Guards ===
- Reishiro Saeki (佐伯 玲士郎, Saeki Reishirō), voiced by Shotaro Morikubo, is the head of the First Student Council on campus.
- Aine Shizuma (志津間 哀音, Shizuma Aine), voiced by Satomi Satō, is Reiko and Reishirou's cousin. Like Misao, she is a spirit/projection and the burial doll of Reishiro's Asura Machina.
- Reiko Saeki (佐伯 玲子, Saeki Reiko), voiced by Kimiko Koyama, is Reishirou's younger sister and class president of Tomoharu's class.

=== Second Student Council / Pilgrim Union ===
- Rikka Kurasawa (倉澤 六夏, Kurasawa Rikka), voiced by Eri Kitamura, is the president of the Second Student Council, which supervises committees in the school.
- Shuu Mahiwa (真日和 秀, Mahiwa Shū), voiced by Junji Majima, is the treasurer of the Second Student Council, and also Rikka's manservant.

=== Kantou Student Union ===
- You Susugihara (雪原 瑶, Susugihara Yō), voiced by Sayori Ishizuka, is Shirogane's former handler. You is called "GD's Destra".
- Aki Kitsutaka (橘高 秋希, Kitsutaka Aki), voiced by Hiromi Hirata, is Toru's sister and the former burial doll of Kurogane.
- Haruna Chiyohara (千代原 はる奈, Chiyohara Haruna), voiced by Reiko Takagi, is the handler of Aenka and the members of GD. She uses the old style of the Japanese language.
- Kyoumu Satomi (里見 恭武, Satomi Kyōmu), voiced by Yoshinori Fujita, is the handler of Bismuth.

=== Tomoharu's relatives ===
- Naotaka Natsume (夏目 直貴, Natsume Naotaka), voiced by Miyu Irino, is Tomoharu's older brother.
- Kazuha Sonomiya (苑宮 和葉, Sonomiya Kazuha) is Tomoharu's stepsister. Kazuha is haunted by a ghost whose name is Saika (咲華). Although Tomoharu thinks she does not like him, which contributed to his decision to move into Meiou-tei and live on his own, she does in fact like him, but is too shy to speak easily to him.

=== Kanade's relatives ===
- President of Takatsuki-gumi (嵩月組社長, Takatsuki-gumi Shachō), voiced by Eizou Tsuda, is Kanade's father, and the president of a large organization known as the Demon Association.
- Uzumasa Shioizumi (潮泉 太秦, Shioizumi Uzumasa), voiced by Akihiko Ishizumi, is Kanade's grandfather and a lover of scrollwork. He is also the owner of the Meiou-tei.
- Ritsu Shioizumi (潮泉 律都, Shioizumi Ritsu), voiced by Yōko Hikasa, is Kanade's cousin and a college student.

=== Others ===
- An Oohara (大原 杏, Ōhara An), voiced by Aki Toyosaki, is one of Tomoharu's few close friends, who calls Tomoharu by the nickname Tomo.
- Yukari Kurosaki (黒崎 紫浬, Kurosaki Yukari), voiced by Rie Tanaka, is Shuri's younger twin sister.
- Hiwako Torishima (鳳島 氷羽子, Torishima Hiwako), voiced by Ao Takahashi, is Tokiya's contracting demon, nicknamed "Kori Hime (Ice Princess)" from her looks and character. Hiwako uses an ice naginata named "Hyou-ou" when she fights.
- Takaya Kagakagari (加賀篝 隆也, Kagakagari Takaya), voiced by Kazuya Nakai, is the main antagonist of season 1. He is a famous guitarist, demon hunter, and lingerie thief, and is known as the "Lingerier of Hamelin (ハーメルンの下着男, Hāmerun no Shitagi Otoko)".

== Media ==
=== Light novels ===
No.	Title	Release date	ISBN
1	アスラクライン	July 10, 2005	978-4-8402-3090-2
2	アスラクライン(2) 夜とUMAとDカップ	October 10, 2005	978-4-8402-3179-4
3	アスラクライン(3) やまいはきから	February 10, 2006	978-4-8402-3308-8
4	アスラクライン(4) 秘密の転校生のヒミツ	June 10, 2006	978-4-8402-3449-8
5	アスラクライン(5) 洛高アンダーワールド	September 10, 2006	978-4-8402-3550-1
6	アスラクライン(6) おしえて生徒会長!	January 10, 2007	978-4-8402-3685-0
7	アスラクライン(7) 凍えて眠れ	May 10, 2007	978-4-8402-3842-7
8	アスラクライン(8) 真夏の夜のナイトメア	August 10, 2007	978-4-8402-3934-9
9	アスラクライン(9) KLEIN Re-MIX	December 10, 2007	978-4-8402-4118-2
10	アスラクライン(10) 科學部カイメツ	June 10, 2008	978-4-04-867088-3
11	アスラクライン(11) めぐりあい異世界	October 10, 2008	978-4-04-867267-2
12	アスラクライン(12) 世界崩壊カウントダウン	April 10, 2009	978-4-04-867763-9
13	アスラクライン(13) さくらさくら	November 10, 2009	978-4-04-868141-4
14	アスラクライン(14) The Lost Files	February 10, 2010	978-4-04-868334-0

=== Manga ===
No.	Japanese release date	Japanese ISBN
1	March 27, 2009	978-4-04-867715-8
2	September 26, 2009	978-4-04-868110-0
3	March 27, 2010	978-4-04-868506-1
4	November 27, 2010	978-4-04-868994-6

=== Anime ===
The anime first premiered on April 2, 2009. The opening theme used for the first season is "Spiral" by Angela, and the ending theme is "Link", also by Angela. The single for the two songs was released on May 13, 2009. A second season aired on October 1, 2009, again using opening and ending themes by Angela. The opening theme of the second season is "Alternative", and the ending theme is "Kanata no delight". The series is licensed in North America by Maiden Japan.

== Reception ==
Theron Martin of the Anime News Network criticized the show for "generally failing to make sense".
