= Gakuto Mikumo =

Japanese novelist (born 1970)

Gakuto Mikumo (三雲 岳斗, Mikumo Gakuto; born 1970) is a Japanese writer of mystery and science fiction light novels from the Oita Prefecture in Japan. He is a member of the Mystery Writers of Japan and the Honkaku Mystery Writers Club of Japan.

He studied the English language at Sophia University, where he graduated. In 1998 Mikumo won silver in the fifth Dengeki Novel Prize with his debut novel, Called Gehenna. He went on to win the Japan SF Rookie of the Year Award in 1999 with M.G.H., and a special prize in the Sneaker Awards in 2000 with Earth Reverse. Mikumo is currently most well known for the Asura Cryin' series and the Strike the Blood series.

== Works ==
Asura Cryin' series

- Asura Cryin' (アスラクライン) (xxxx), ISBN 978-4-8402-3090-2
- Asura Cryin' 2 "Yoru to UMA to D-cup" (アスラクライン2 夜とUMAとDカップ) (xxxx), ISBN 978-4-8402-3179-4
- Asura Cryin' 3 "Yamai wa Ki Kara" (アスラクライン3 やまいはきから) (xxxx), ISBN 978-4-8402-3308-8
- Asura Cryin' 4 "Himitsu no Tenkōsei no Himitsu" (アスラクライン4 秘密の転校生のヒミツ) (xxxx), ISBN 978-4-8402-3449-8
- Asura Cryin' 5 "Rakukō Underworld" (アスラクライン5 洛高アンダーワールド) (xxxx), ISBN 978-4-8402-3550-1
- Asura Cryin' 6 "Oshiete Seitokaichō!" (アスラクライン6 おしえて生徒会長！) (xxxx), ISBN 978-4-8402-3685-0
- Asura Cryin' 7 "Kogoete Nemure" (アスラクライン7 凍えて眠れ) (xxxx), ISBN 978-4-8402-3842-7
- Asura Cryin' 8 "Manatsu no Yoru no Nightmare" (アスラクライン8 真夏の夜のナイトメア) (xxxx), ISBN 978-4-8402-3934-9
- Asura Cryin' 9 "KLEIN Re-MIX" (アスラクライン9 KLEIN Re-MIX) (xxxx), ISBN 978-4-8402-4118-2
- Asura Cryin' 10 "Kagakubu Kaimetsu" (アスラクライン10 科學部カイメツ) (xxxx), ISBN 978-4-04-867088-3
- Asura Cryin' 11 "Meguriai Isekai" (アスラクライン11 めぐりあい異世界) (xxxx), ISBN 978-4-04-867267-2
- Asura Cryin' 12 "Sekai Hōkai Countdowm" (アスラクライン12 世界崩壊カウントダウン) (xxxx), ISBN 978-4-04-867763-9
- Asura Cryin' 13 "Sakura Sakura" (アスラクライン13 さくらさくら) (xxxx), ISBN 978-4-04-868141-4
- Asura Cryin' 14 "The Lost Files" (アスラクライン14 The Lost Files) (xxxx), ISBN 978-4-04-868334-0

Called Gehenna series

- Called Gehenna 1 (コールド・ゲヘナ1; Kōrudo Gehena Ichi) (xxxx), ISBN 4-07-310947-2
- Called Gehenna 2 (コールド・ゲヘナ2; Kōrudo Gehena Ni) (xxxx), ISBN 4-8402-1256-2
- Called Gehenna 3 (コールド・ゲヘナ3; Kōrudo Gehena San) (xxxx), ISBN 4-8402-1393-3
- Called Gehenna 4 (コールド・ゲヘナ4; Kōrudo Gehena Yon) (xxxx), ISBN 4-8402-1777-7
- Called Gehenna Unplugged (コールド・ゲヘナ あんぷらぐど; Kōrudo Gehena Anpuragudo) (xxxx), ISBN 4-8402-1595-2

Dantalian no Shoka series

- Dantalian no Shoka 1 (ダンタリアンの書架1) (xxxx), ISBN 978-4-04-424113-1
- Dantalian no Shoka 2 (ダンタリアンの書架2) (xxxx), ISBN 978-4-04-424114-8
- Dantalian no Shoka 3 (ダンタリアンの書架3) (xxxx), ISBN 978-4-04-424115-5
- Dantalian no Shoka 4 (ダンタリアンの書架4) (xxxx), ISBN 978-4-04-424116-2
- Dantalian no Shoka 5 (ダンタリアンの書架5) (xxxx), ISBN 978-4-04-424117-9
- Dantalian no Shoka 6 (ダンタリアンの書架6) (xxxx), ISBN 978-4-04-424118-6

i.d. series

- Kamitsukai Tachi no Nagai Hōkago (神使いたちの長い放課後) (xxxx), ISBN 4-8402-2379-3
- seven - ISBN 4-8402-2727-6
- Horobi no Ōkoku (滅びの王国) (xxxx), ISBN 4-8402-2939-2

Rebellion series

- Hōkago no Satsurikusha (放課後の殺戮者) (xxxx), ISBN 4-8402-1520-0
- Shisatsu Kōtei En (弑殺校庭園) (xxxx), ISBN 4-8402-1685-1
- Homura wo Seou Shōnentachi (炎を背負う少年たち) (xxxx), ISBN 4-8402-1977-X
- Kanojo no Inai Kyōshitsu (彼女のいない教室) (xxxx), ISBN 4-8402-2032-8
- Rakuen no Akaki Tsubasa no Toki wo (楽園に紅き翼の詩を) (xxxx), ISBN 4-8402-2149-9

Strike the Blood series

Zettai Karen Children series

- Zettai Karen Children THE NOVELS "B.A.B.E.L. Hōkai" (絶対可憐チルドレン・THE NOVELS～B.A.B.E.L.崩壊～) (xxxx), ISBN 978-4-09-451069-0

Hollow Regalia series

Re:bel Robotica series

- Re:bel Robotica 0 (レベルロボチカゼロ, Reberu Robochika Zero)

=== Video games ===
- Metal Gear Solid: Portable Ops – writer
- Metal Gear Survive – writer
